= Welsh hip-hop =

Overview of hip-hop from Wales

- Stylistic origins: Hip-hop, Music of Wales, urban,
- Cultural origins: Wales
- Typical instruments: rapping

Fusion genres
- Celtic Fusion

Regional scenes
- Music of Cardiff, Music of Newport

Other topics
- Drum and bass, dubstep, grime

Welsh hip-hop (Welsh: hip-hop Cymru) is a genre of Welsh music, and a culture that covers a variety of styles of hip-hop made in Wales.

== History ==
Early hip-hop culture was a feature of the popular culture of South Wales by the early 1980s, with Breakdancing "battles" featuring crews from Barry, Cardiff, Cwmbran, Newport and Port Talbot.

=== 1980s and 1990s: Early success and decline ===
The Earliest Welsh hip-hop groups soon appeared with Cardiff's DJ Jaffa and rappers MC Eric, Dike and 4Dee. Hip-hop productions were also pioneered with LSD Productions in Cwmbran, Mortal Danger in Swansea and 2Sharp in the South Wales valleys. However, the first Welsh hip-hop releases came from North Wales acts with "Dyddiau Braf (Rap Cymreag)" by the duo Llwybr Llaethog being cited as the first release of Welsh hip-hop music. Llwybr Llaethog were inspired to change direction from their experimental, post-punk origins following a 1984 trip to The Roxy nightclub in New York City. Band member John Griffiths had been inspired by the sounds of DJ Red Alert and the enthusiastic breakdancing. On his return to Wales, Griffiths decided to integrate the new music with Welsh language culture and socialist politics.

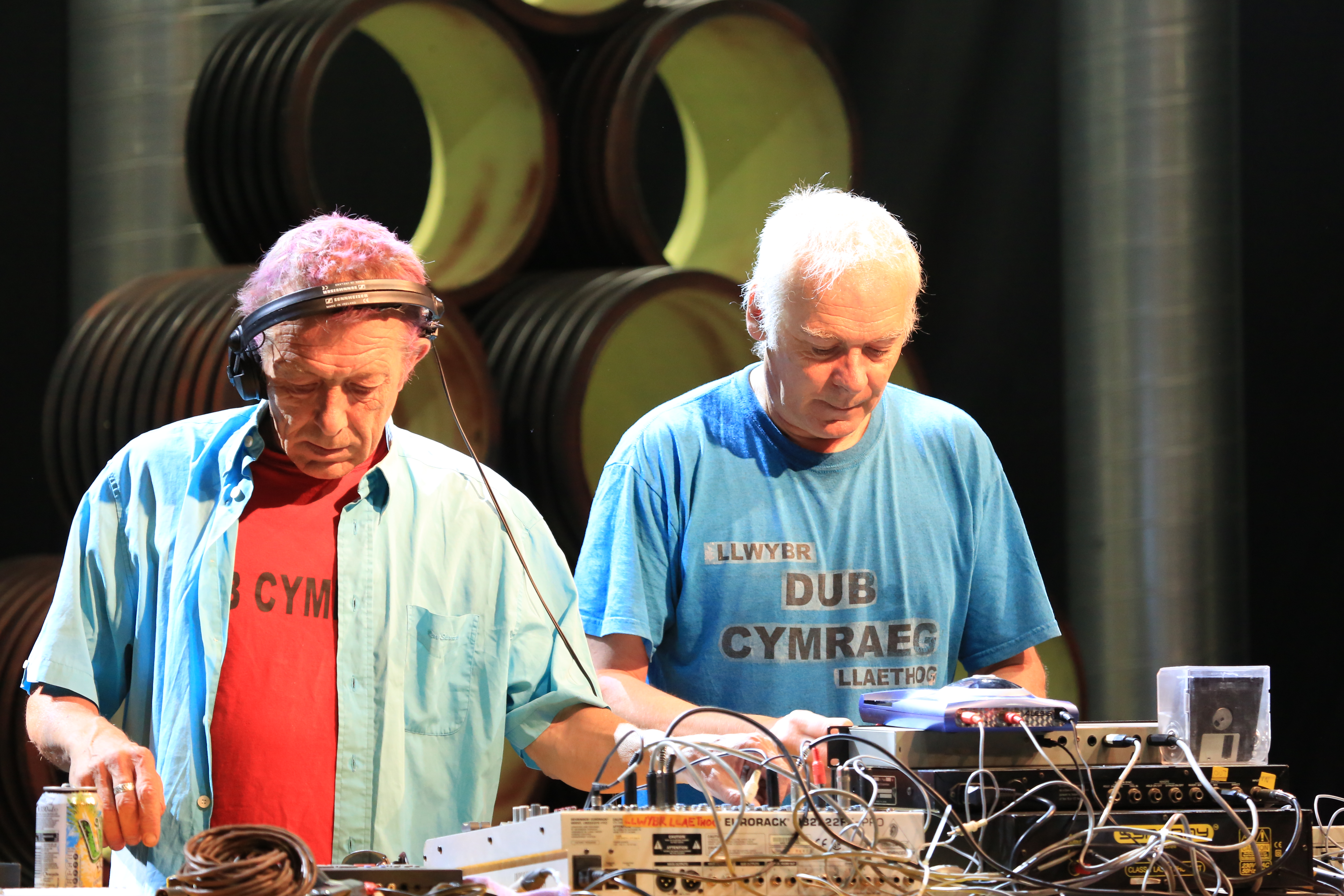
Welsh hip-hop pioneers Llwybr Llaethog performing in 2014

Llwybr Llaethog would release more hip-hop music through the label Anhrefn Records, with more notable hip-hop influences such as Scratching, audio sampling and cut-and-paste production. While early Welsh hip-hop had been dominated by Welsh language acts from north Wales, south Wales groups had become more prominent by 1990, with Welsh-Jamaicans introducing reggae influences and developing the sound systems culture.

At the end of the 1980s more and more Welsh musicians would move away from hip-hop, with the rise of rave culture and UK dance music, a change perhaps best typified when the Cardiff hip-hop pioneer, MC Eric found international chart success with his Eurodance outfit Technotronic. New acts continued to emerge such as Steffan Cravos' Carmarthenshire hip-hop group Tystion in 1991 and Benji Webbe's Rap metal outfit Dub War who formed in Newport in 1993. Cravos would also establish his own label, Fitamin Un in 1996 as a response to what he saw as the era's proliferation of "dull guitar bands". Despite this, Welsh pop and rock music continued to dominate the decade and hip-hop became far less prominent both in Welsh culture and as part of the emerging Cool Cymru movement.

=== 2000s and 2010s: Chart success and cultural prominence ===
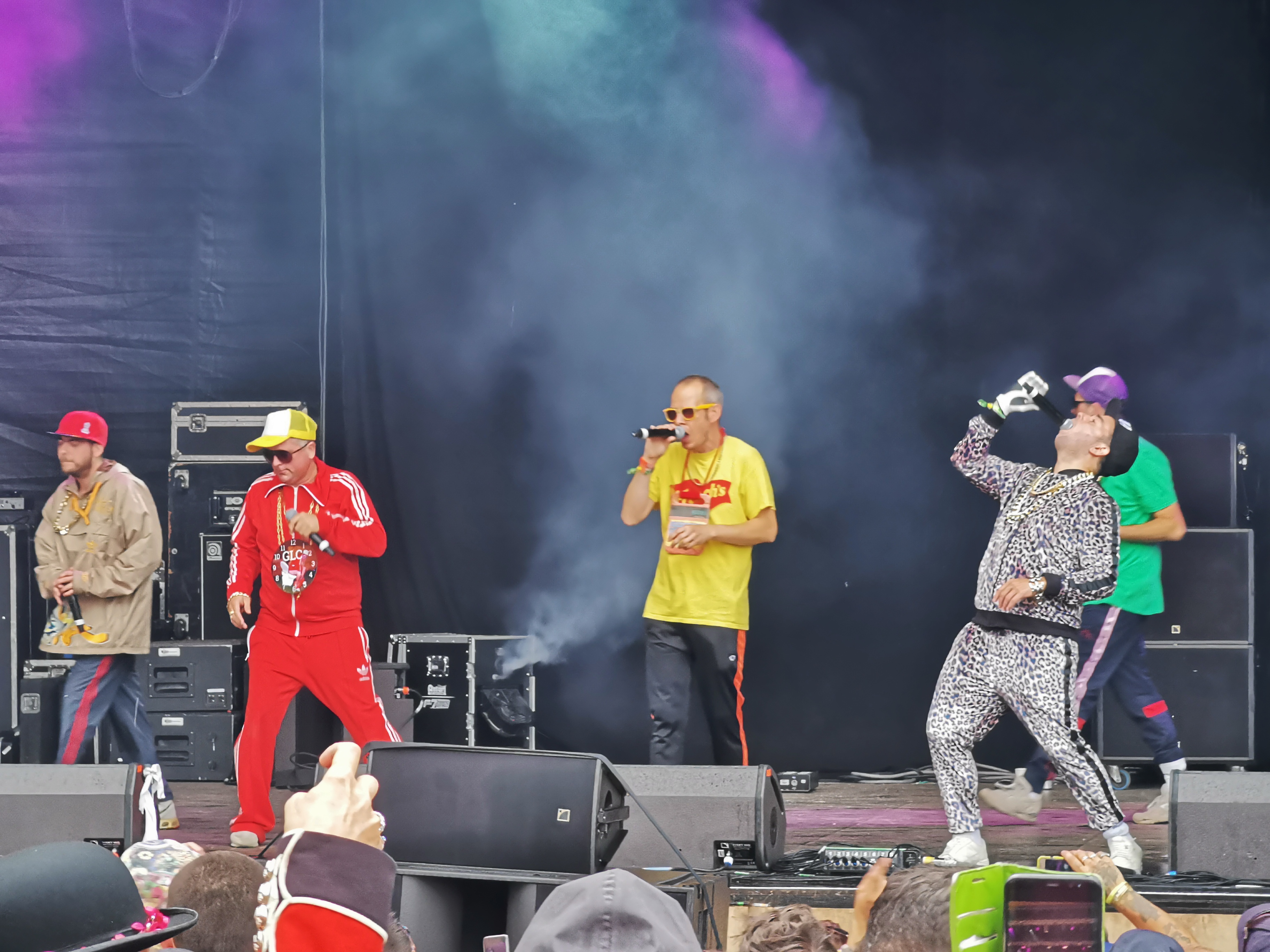
Goldie Lookin Chain in 2019.

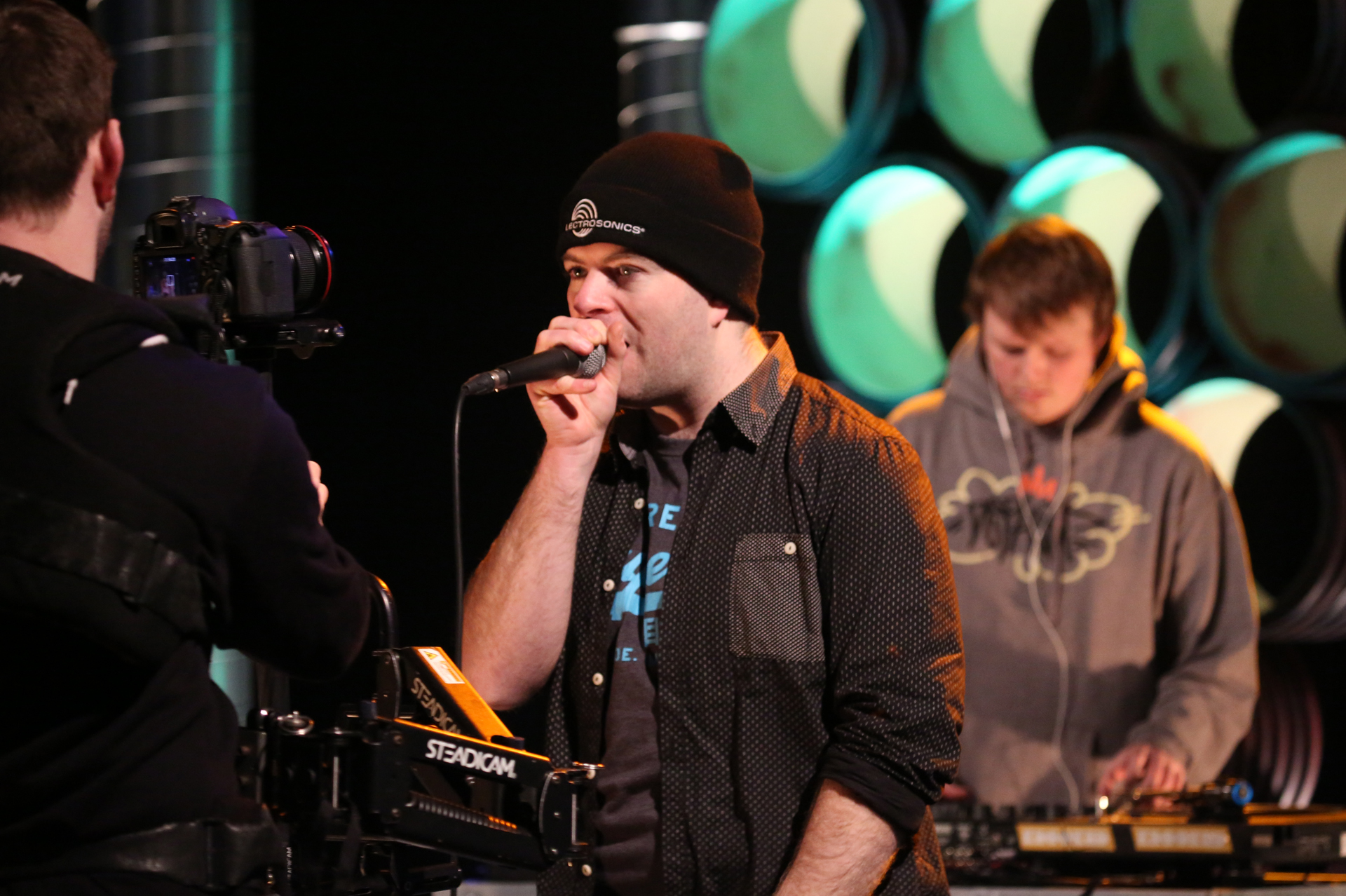
Mr Phormula in 2014.

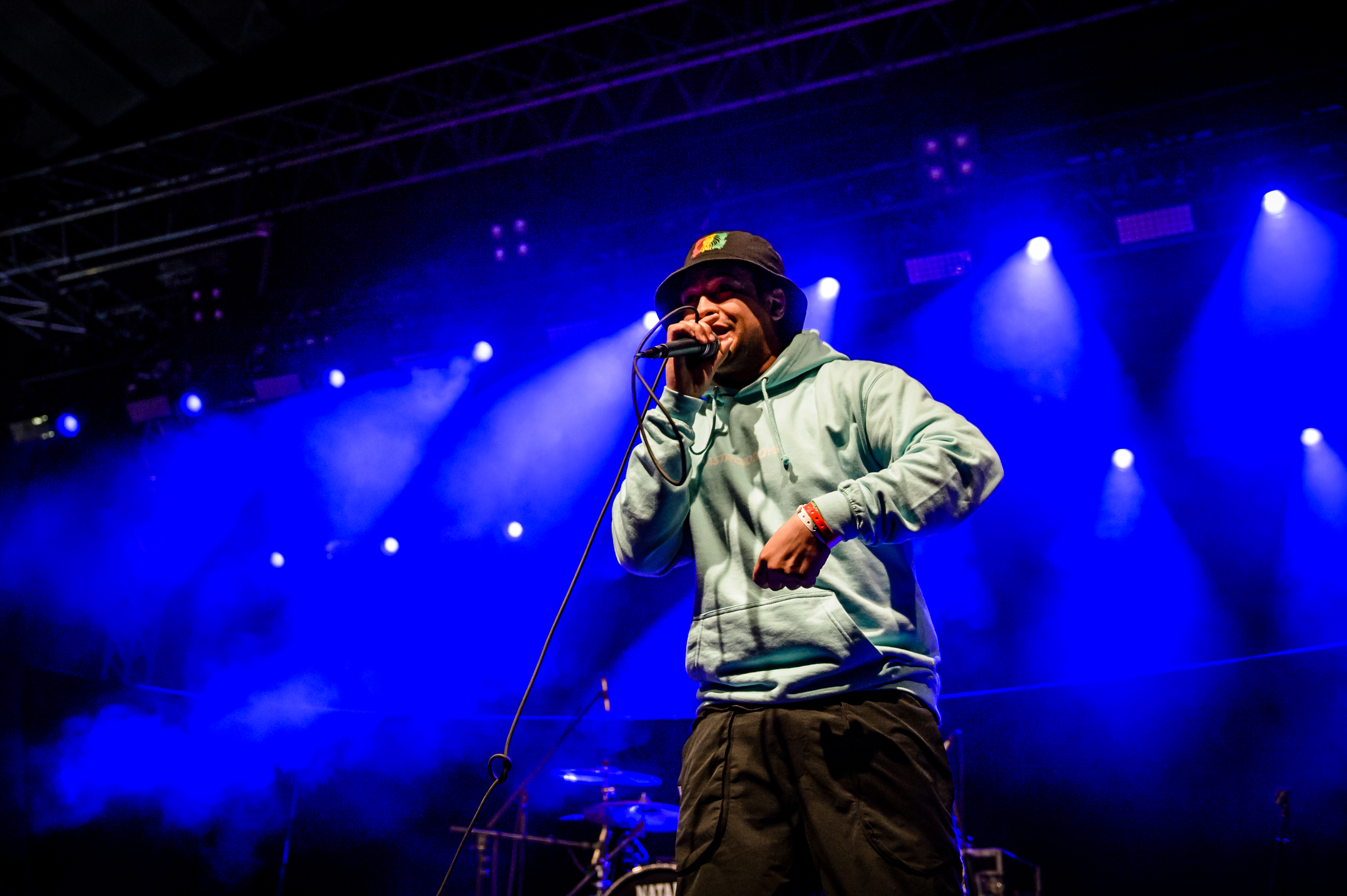
Astroid Boys in 2017.

Goldie Lookin Chain was one of the first comedy hip-hop groups from Wales to chart. The group from Newport, founded in the early 2000s to produce songs with "incendiary beats" and "flammable-looking trackie tops". The Cardiff-based hip-hop label Associated Minds was founded in 2004, but it has generally been difficult for Welsh rappers to gain attention outside Wales.

In 2012 a bilingual rap artist, Mr Phormula, became the first artist to rap in Welsh at the MOBO awards.

In 2016 Astroid Boys, a Welsh rap rock band from Cardiff, emerged with a music style that has been called a mix of hardcore punk and grime music.

=== 2020s: Continued resurgence ===
By 2019 Astroid Boys were described as "undoubtedly leading the way for Welsh rap". MC Benji said "we play with a lot of different styles and ideas and don’t tend to conform to any set genre."

In January 2022 Welsh rapper LEMFRECK was announced in the lineup for "In It Together", dubbed the "Welsh Glastonbury".

In May 2022 Dom James and Lloyd, two rap artists who rap in both Welsh and English, released the track "Pwy Sy'n Galw?" ("Who's Calling?"). In the summer of 2022, Sage Todz (Toda Ogunbanwo) from Penygroes in Gwynedd, emerged as a bilingual talent. He released the first-ever Bilingual language drill track called "Rownd a Rownd" ("Round and Round") which gained popularity in Wales. Sage Todz also released a single called "O HYD" ("Still"), sampling Dafydd Iwan's "Yma O Hyd" ("Still Here") anthemic hit. "O HYD" was played by the Football Association of Wales during Wales' 2022 FIFA World Cup campaign.

== Accolades ==
For his work in music, MC Eric was recognised with the Welsh Music Inspiration award at the annual Welsh Music Prize in 2024. The National Museum of Wales is currently hosting an exhibition on the history of Welsh hip-hop and its influence on Welsh culture.

== List of Welsh hip-hop artists ==
=== Alternative hip-hop ===
- LEMFRECK
- Luke RV
- Ren Gill

=== Drill ===
- Baddathanwho
- Juice Menace
- Sage Todz
- Snow FTS

=== Grime ===
- Astroid Boys
- Dom James and Lloyd
- Elro
- Local
- Mace The Great

=== Drum and bass ===
- Mr Traumatik

== See also ==
- Music of Wales
- UK rap
