= Yma o Hyd =

1983 single by Dafydd Iwan and Ar Log

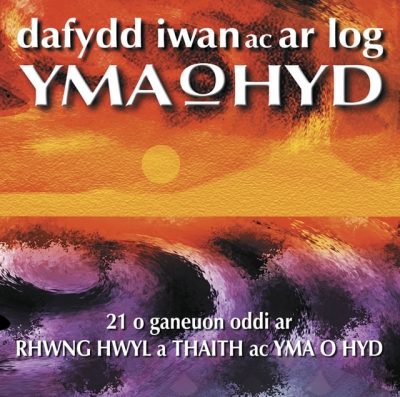

Single by Dafydd Iwan ac Ar Log

from the album Yma o Hyd
- Released: 1983
- Genre: Welsh folk music Celtic Rock
- Length: 4:11
- Label: Sain
- Songwriter: Dafydd Iwan

"Yma o Hyd" (Welsh for 'still here') is a Welsh-language folk song by Dafydd Iwan. The song was released during Iwan and Ar Log's Taith Macsen ('Macsen's journey') tour in 1983. Since then it has continued to gain popularity at cultural and sporting events.

The song has topped the UK iTunes charts twice since 2020 with a poll suggesting that 35% of people in Wales knew at least some of the lyrics.

== Background ==
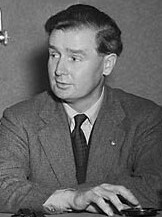
The historian Gwynfor Evans is said to have given Iwan the idea for the song.

Iwan was described by Ned Thomas as "the master" of the popular songs that accompanied the growth of Welsh nationalism in the 1960s. These songs were often characterised by both satirical and political themes as well as historical references. Indeed, Iwan became a key figure in Welsh culture as a well known television personality, recording artist and an outspoken member of Welsh nationalist organisations. Iwan's early career has been described as playing a major role "in mobilising the Welsh popular music scene in a nationalist linguistic direction".

However, by the time Iwan came to write "Yma o Hyd", his life and career was much more troubled, having been imprisoned four times for his activism and also in the middle of a "terrible divorce".

At that time, Iwan was "feeling demoralised" by the state of Wales; which had seen the rejection of a devolved Welsh government in a 1979 referendum and the "devastation" caused by the political ideology of Prime Minister Margaret Thatcher.

"It was a terrible time and the Thatcher regime hit Wales heavily. Coal mines and steelworks were closed and I was in the middle of a terrible divorce. Yma o Hyd is about how we're still here, despite everything and everyone and even ourselves."

— Dafydd Iwan on his inspiration for writing the song.

It was against this background that Iwan was looking to write a song that would "raise the spirits". During a conversation with his friend, the historian and Plaid Cymru MP Gwynfor Evans, Iwan is said to have been given the initial idea for the song, which draws parallels between what he saw as the contemporary threats to Wales and the historical threats the Welsh people had suffered, confronted, and survived since Magnus Maximus (Welsh: Macsen Wledig) withdrew the Legions at the de facto end of Roman rule. As such, Iwan hoped the song would "remind people we still speak Welsh against all odds. To show we are still here".

== Composition ==
Yma o Hyd performed by Dafydd Iwan and Ar Log

The song consists of three verses and a repeated chorus, with the opening and closing verses reference Macsen Wledig, ostensibly the Welsh name for Roman Emperor Magnus Maximus. Macsen is a prominent figure in medieval Welsh literature, recorded in the sixth century by Gildas and in the ninth century work, Historia Brittonum where Macsen is said to have transferred authority back to British rulers. As such, Macsen is the common progenitor listed in the earliest Welsh genealogies and on the Pillar of Eliseg, erected by a Welsh king who was still claiming Macsen as an ancestor nearly 500 years after he left Britain. He was considered the founding father of several medieval Welsh dynasties, including those of the Kingdom of Powys and the Kingdom of Gwent, and he figures in lists of the Fifteen Tribes of Wales. In Welsh legend, Macsen appears in stories such as Breuddwyd Macsen Wledig (English: The Dream of Ruler Maximus) which features in the White Book of Rhydderch.

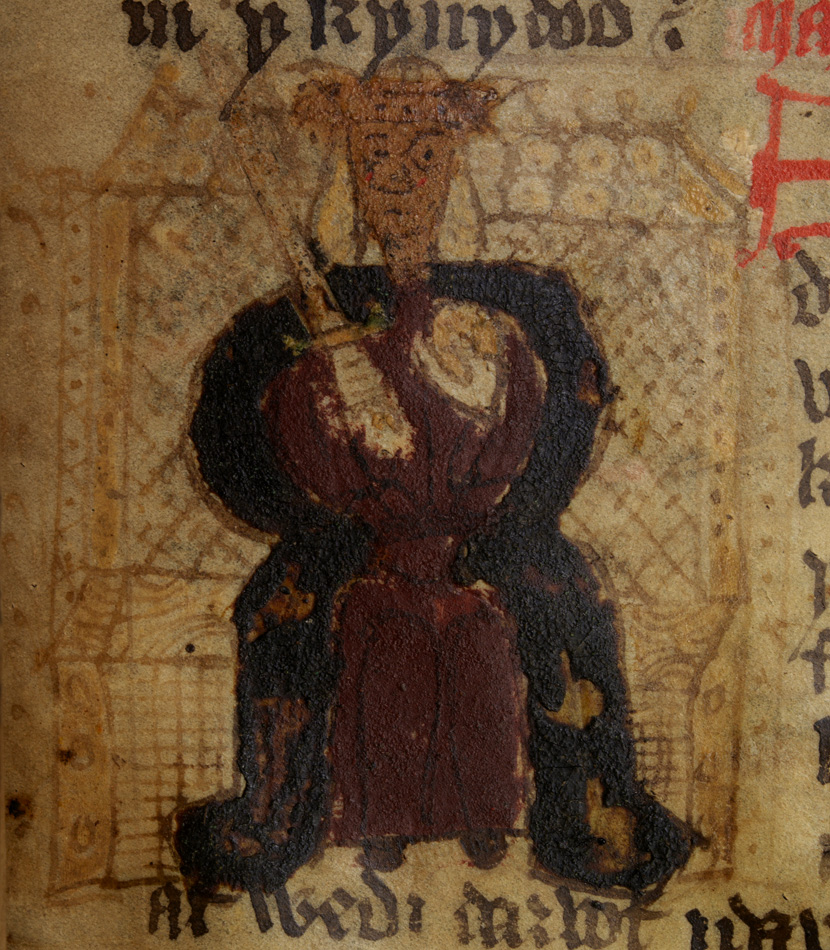
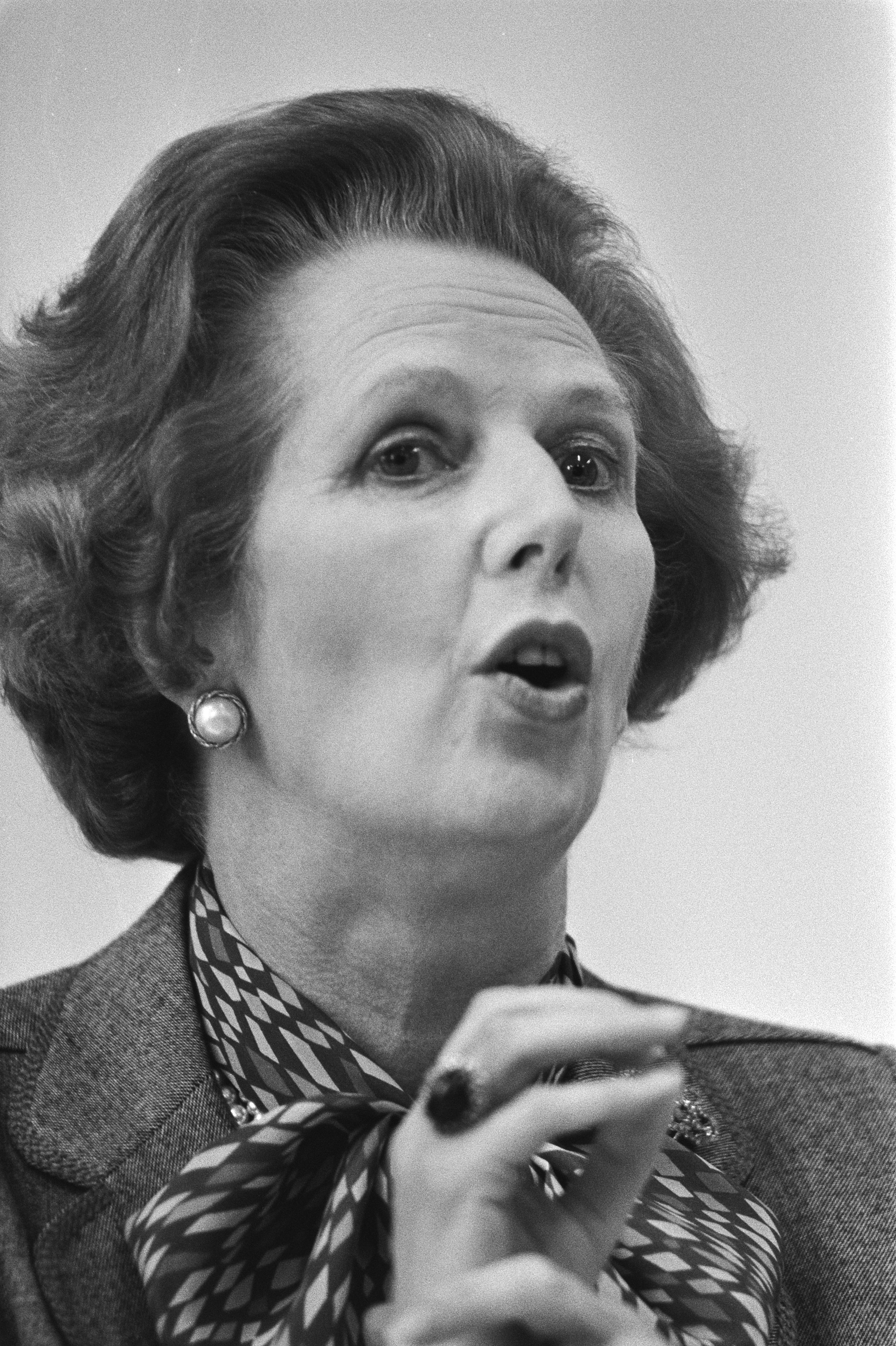
"Yma o Hyd" utilises a common understanding of Welsh history's long continuity. The campaigns of Macsen Wledig and the turmoil caused by the first government of Margaret Thatcher, parallel the adversities of ancient Wales with those of the modern nation.

In "Yma o Hyd", Iwan uses the still common knowledge of Macsen to show that the memory and culture of the Ancient Britons is still here, with the Welsh language being a Brythonic language that the ancient Britons would have spoken.

The third verse references Macsen alongside the 18th-century caricature Dic Siôn Dafydd and the contemporary figure of Margaret Thatcher. Iwan hoped to parallel the troubles of ancient Wales with the more modern threats to the nation, to demonstrate the fortitude and survival of the Welsh culture at a time he felt it was most threatened.

== Cultural impact ==
Iwan debuted the song on his 1983 tour with the folk band Ar Log. The "Macsen tour" (named after "Yma o Hyd"'s references to Macsen Wledig) was a great success, with Iwan and Ar Log deciding to release a joint album of the new music later in the year.

=== As a response to Thatcherism ===
During the 1984–1985 miners' strike, Iwan would sing "Yma o Hyd" on the picket lines on numerous occasions, as well as performing it for quarry workers and farmers. Iwan stated that "the effects of Thatcherism were so blatant, so far-reaching. And Welshness was in turmoil. "Yma o Hyd" was a deliberate antidote to that".

It has been suggested that the song played a "not insignificant" role in raising the morale of Welsh nationalists during Margaret Thatcher's 1980s tenure as Prime Minister of the UK. The original version of the song refers to Thatcher, "Er gwaetha hen Fagi a'i chriw" ('Despite old Maggie and her crew'). Following Thatcher's ordered closure of Welsh and other British mines, fewer than 40% of Welsh households were headed by someone in full-time employment by 1986 and "two-thirds of Welsh miners would become redundant".

=== Impact on education and language ===
The song also inspired a resurgence of support for Welsh medium education and (amongst other factors) contributed to the delivery of the Education Reform Act 1988. The song also contributed to support for the Welsh language, namely the Welsh Language Act 1993, which placed Welsh on equal footing with English in Wales for the first time in British history.

=== Impact on devolution and nationalism ===
The song contributed to support for a National Assembly for Wales (later renamed Senedd) and in 1997 the Welsh electorate voted in favour of Welsh devolution. In January 2020, the song reached number one in the UK iTunes chart, spurred on by purchases by supporters of Welsh independence group YesCymru. The campaign mirrored the success of The Wolfe Tones' song "Come Out, Ye Black and Tans" earlier that month.

=== In sport ===
==== Rugby ====
Even before the release of "Yma o Hyd", Iwan's music had a long association with rugby and specifically Llanelli RFC. Iwan was a rugby fan since his youth in Brynamman, and had a long friendship with the Llanelli player Ray Gravell since the 1970s when Iwan was imprisoned for refusing to pay his fines for defacing English only road signs, Gravell ensured Iwan's release from jail by paying his fines for him.

As a fan of Iwan's music, Gravell would sing his songs before his Llanelli, Wales, and British & Irish Lions matches. The song itself would become an official team anthem in the 1990s when Gravell became president of the club and arranged for the song to be played every time Llanelli and the Scarlets scored. Since the Parc y Scarlets stadium was opened in 2008, the words "Yma o Hyd" has been displayed above the players tunnel.

==== Football ====
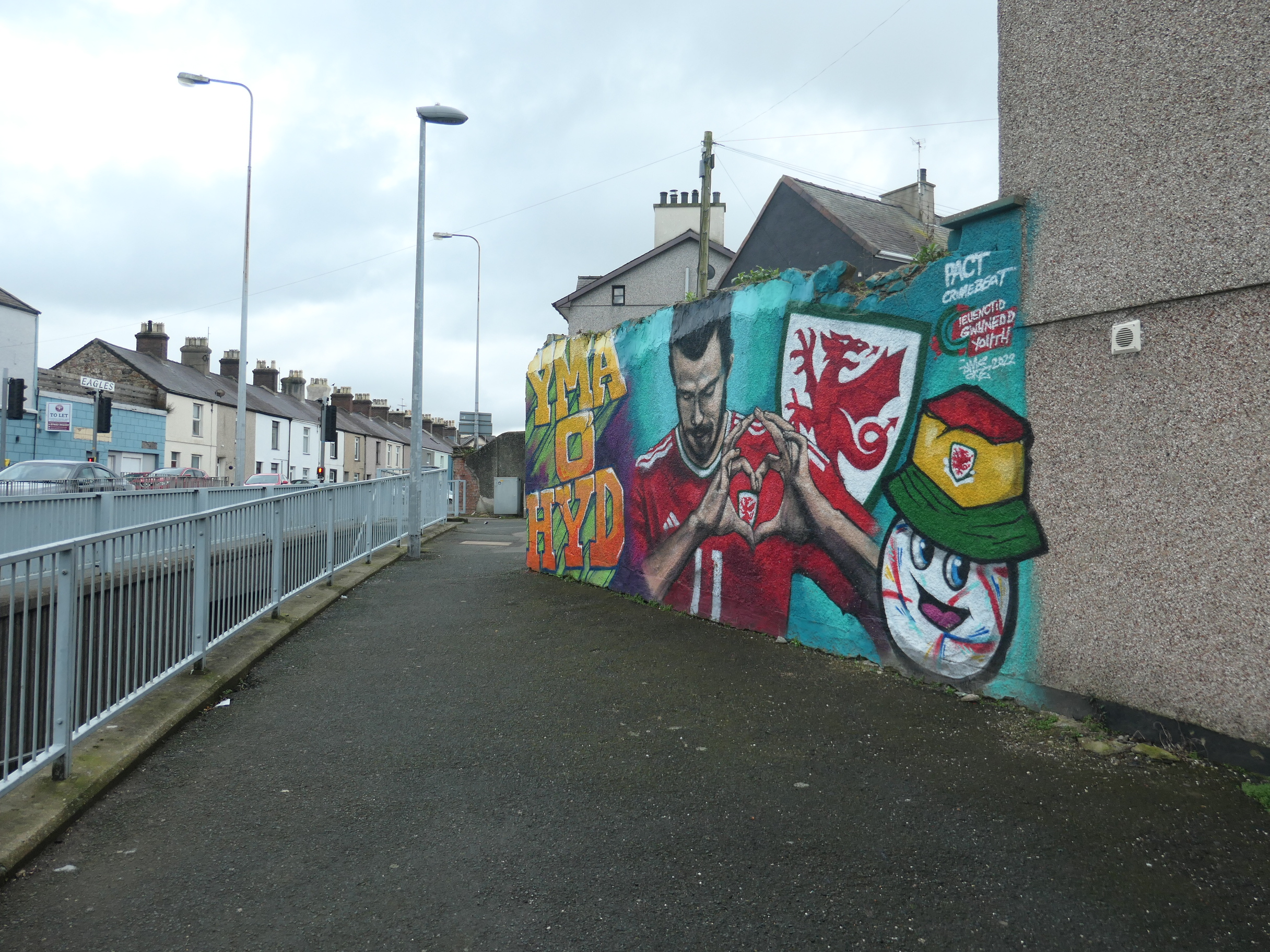
Graffiti in Caernarfon depicting Welsh soccer player Gareth Bale next to the words "Yma o Hyd"

By 2019, songs that were more associated with Welsh rugby crowds were being sung by association football fans at Wales international matches at the Cardiff City Stadium, and the song became an unofficial anthem for supporters of Wrexham AFC and Cardiff City FC.

The Wales manager, Rob Page was aware of the song as a rugby anthem when Chris Gunter suggested playing it on the team bus as they travelled from their hotel in Baku to the training ground before their 2-0 win against Azerbaijan in 2020. The song would be played "every day before training and on the coach" during Wales' 2022 FIFA World Cup qualification campaign. The Welsh players invited Iwan to perform at their qualification semi-final against Austria, with Iwan accepting and playing the song before Wales won the game 2–1. Iwan was again asked to perform before the final match of qualification agiant Ukraine which Wales also won, qualifying for their first World Cup since 1958. Following these performances, the song went on to renewed chart success, reaching No. 1 in the UK on the iTunes chart. A new version of the song was recorded as the official song for Wales at the 2022 FIFA World Cup.

== Use in media ==
- A chapter on the history of the song and its context appears in Siôn Jobbins's book The Phenomenon of Welshness, or 'How many aircraft carriers would an independent Wales need?'.
- A version of the song appears in the Welsh black comedy film The Toll, released in the UK in 2021.
- The song was sampled in a bilingual rap song as part of Wales' FIFA World Cup campaign by rap artist Sage Todz, titled "O Hyd".
- Episode 10 of season 2 of Welcome to Wrexham covers the Gresford disaster and closes the episode with a subtitled rendition of "Yma o Hyd".
- The song was used in Episode 4 of Series 3 of Our Welsh Chapel Dream, Channel 4.
