= Clera =

Society for traditional musical instruments of Wales

- Formation: August 1996
- Founded at: Llandeilo, Wales
- Legal status: Charity
- Purpose: Art, culture
- Location: Wales
- Chair: Geraint Roberts
- Website: Official website
- Formerly called: Cymdeithas Offerynnau Traddodiadol Cymru (1996-2003)

Clera is the society for traditional musical instruments of Wales. It was founded by a group of musicians including Stephen Rees, Robin Huw Bowen, Andy McLauchlin, Wyn Thomas, Huw Roberts, Llio Rhydderch, Elonwy Wright and Frances Môn Jones. Geraint Roberts is the current chair.

== Overview ==
Clera was launched officially at the Llandeilo National Eisteddfod in August 1996 as Cymdeithas Offerynnau Traddodiadol Cymru (COTC). It renamed itself Clera in 2003. Clera is an old Welsh verb referring to the activity of wandering musicians and poets (clerwyr).

Clera's objectives are to promote Welsh traditional music and to promote Welsh traditional instruments. One of Clera's major activities is to organise workshops around Wales to stimulate interest and offer tuition. It also organises informal sessions and lobbies the media to include traditional music in its programming. Clera is a registered charity and is supported by the Arts Council of Wales and the Welsh Amateur Music Federation.

The instruments covered by the definition of traditional instruments of Wales are not exclusively Welsh. They include the fiddle, the flute, the crwth, the pibgorn (hornpipe), the harp (including the triple harp), and the Welsh pipes.

== Y Glerorfa ==
Y Glerorfa (the Clerorfa) is an "orchestra" of traditional musicians. In early 2009, it had well over 50 members. It was formed in 2006 to celebrate Clera's 10th anniversary in a concert in Galeri Caernarfon and has grown and developed since then. Most members are amateurs, and over 30% are under the age of 21. Y Glerorfa performed at Festival Interceltique de Lorient in 2008.

== See also ==
- Music of Wales
