= Crys =

Welsh rock band

Crys (Welsh word for Shirt) are a Welsh heavy rock/metal band from Resolven, South Wales. The band was formed in 1976 by the brothers Liam Forde (vocals, rhythm guitar) Scott Forde (bass guitar); and Alun Morgan (lead guitar) while attending boarding school in Hereford, England. They were originally named 'Salic Law' and performed at numerous pubs and clubs in the South Wales area.

== Early days ==
Crys were offered a deal to record a single if they agreed to put Welsh lyrics to their existing songs (which had previously been performed in English). The band complied and the resulting single "Cadw Symud / Lan yn y Gogledd" was released in 1980 on Click Records. The single featured Verden Allen (Mott the Hoople) on keyboards and was recorded at Pete King's studio in Swansea. The line-up by this time was completed by Nicky Samuel (drums). 'Crys' is a Welsh word that translates into 'Shirt' in English.

== Success ==
The band's profile continued to rise through appearances on Welsh radio and television shows, which ultimately led to a recording contract with Sain Records. Their debut album Rhyfelwr was released in 1981, and their second Tymor yr Heliwr was released in 1982. Both albums gained airplay on Radio Cymru and BBC Radio Wales and they also became the first Welsh language band invited to perform a session on the BBC Radio One Friday Rock Show hosted by Tommy Vance. They performed a total of four songs, two in Welsh and two in English, for the session. Both albums won the 'Best album of the Year' award at the annual 'Sgrech' awards show – a Welsh language music industry event named after Sgrech. The band continued to perform live throughout Wales and even made a promotional video for the "Merched Gwyllt a Gwin" track from their second album.

== Later years ==
The group disbanded for an extended period of time before recording a third album Roc Cafe in 1995. Original lead guitarist Alun Morgan had emigrated to Canada by this time and was replaced by Mark Thomas. The album was released on compact disc by Fflach Records and included a free sticker.

The band have made numerous live and television appearances over the last few years including a brief reunion of the original line up when Alun Morgan visited Wales, culminating in a televised performance at Bryn Terfels Faenol Festival. Crys have also performed as part of the regional Tyrfe Tawe and Menter Iaith Welsh music events.

A best of compilation titled Sgrech was released by Sain Records in 2006, and was the first time the majority of the band's early material was made available on compact disc and iTunes electronic download.

Along with a televised session recorded at Y Stiwdio Gefn, Llanelli, they also reformed to headline a Cymdeithas yr Iaith event as part of the National Eisteddfod' on 4 August 2014. Crys played The Pontio in Bangor 2017 and Wrexham in the same year. A few more TV appearances and 2022 a gig at Cardigan Castle to celebrate forty years of Fflach.

== Band members ==
=== Current ===
- Liam Forde (Vocals, Rhythm guitar)
- Scott Forde (Bass guitar)
- Grant Roberts (Lead guitar)
- Nicky Samuel (Drums)

=== Former ===
- Alun Morgan (Lead guitar) died 1 January 2012
- Mark Thomas (Lead guitar)

== Discography ==
- "Cadw Symud / Lan yn y Gogledd" – 1980 Click Records (7" single)
- Rhyfelwr – 1981 Sain Records (LP & Cassette)
- Tymor yr Heliwr – 1982 Sain Records (LP & Cassette)
- Roc Cafe – 1995 Fflach Records (CD)
- Sgrech – 2006 Sain Records (CD & iTunes)
- Noson Dawel Iawn – Liam Forde a'r Band – 2012 Sain Records (iTunes):-

Afon Wyllt & Gael yn Iawn – 2022 Fflach Records (iTunes)
