= Rhyfelwr =

Studio album by Crys
- Released: 1981
- Genre: Rock
- Label: Sain
- Producer: Richard Morris

Rhyfelwr is the debut album by the Welsh rock band Crys. It was released in 1981 on the Sain record label and was available on LP and Cassette. It is no longer in print.

== Track listing ==
1. Roc a Rol
2. Mwg
3. Cnau
4. Can Lis
5. Dyma'r Band Cymraeg
6. Nos Sadwrn
7. Noson Dawel Iawn
8. Rhyfelwr

== Credits ==
- Liam Forde (Vocals, Rhythm Guitar)
- Scott Forde (Bass)
- Nicky Samuel (Drums)
- Alun Morgan (Lead Guitar)
