= Mair Garnon =

Welsh comedian and author

- Born: 1928; Saint Dogmaels, Pembrokeshire
- Died: March 4, 2022; Bryn Iwan, Cynwyl Elfed, Carmarthenshire
- Occupations: teacher, author

Mair Garnon (also known as Mair Garnon James; 1928 – 4 March 2022) was a Welsh teacher, comedian, and author. She was the leader of the Noson Lawen programme on S4C and a public speaker. She was heavily involved in the annual Eisteddfod festival and was the first woman ever named as compere in 1990 for the Gŵyl Fawr Aberteifi.

Garnon contributed a volume to the "Cyfres Ti'n Jocan" comedy book series called "Hiwmor Sir Benfro" (translated: "Pembrokeshire Humor"). It includes jokes, light poems, and Garnon's personal memories.

== Personal life ==
Mair Garnon was brought up in Saint Dogmaels in Pembrokeshire near Cardigan. She was a teacher for many years before retiring in the early 1990s. During the 1980s and 90s, she was the presiding magistrate for the local area. As the deputy chairman for the South Ceredigion branch of the Gorsedd Cymru, in 1987, she received the bardic honours of the Green robed Ovate order.

She married Jeff James, who died in 2008, and they had three children. She died on 4 March 2022 at Pencaer Farm, Bryn Iwan, Cynwyl Elfed, Carmarthenshire at the age of 93. A public service was held at Blaenwaun Chapel, Saint Dogmaels on 12 March at 2022 at 11am.

== Legacy ==
The Tlws Coffa Mair Garnon James Memorial Award for best comedian and performer was established in May 2023 to be presented annually at the Eisteddfod Llandudoch.

== Bibliography ==
- Hiwmor Sir Benfro (Y Lolfa, 2006)
- Ody'r Teid yn Mynd Mas? (Gomer Press, 2013)
