= Noson Lawen (TV series) =

Long-running Welsh language variety show

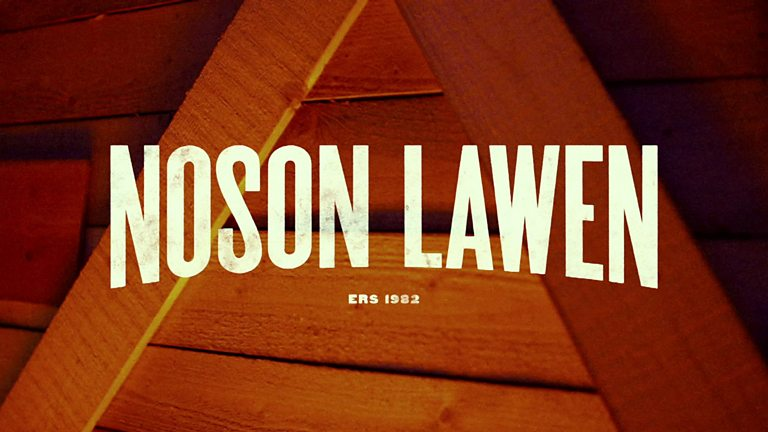
- Title card (2018–present)
- Genre: Comedy; Variety show
- Presented by: Various
- Country of origin: Wales
- Original language: Welsh

Production
- Executive producer: Dylan Huws
- Producer: Olwen Meredydd
- Production location: Various
- Running time: 60 minutes (inc. adverts)
- Production company: Cwmni Da (1997–)

Original release
- Network: S4C
- Release: 11 November 1982 – present

Related
- Royal Variety Performance

Noson Lawen (Note: Welsh pronunciation: [ˈnɔsɔn ˈlauɛn]; lit. 'merry night') is a long-running Welsh language television series, first broadcast on S4C in Wales in 1982.

The evening's performance is presented as a live variety show, and consists of family entertainment that includes comedy, music, dance, magic, choirs, sketches and other speciality acts, with a different host every week. Guests have included not only Welsh-speaking performers like Dafydd Iwan, Robin Huw Bowen and John Ogwen, but international stars such as the quartet Bond.

In the show's early years the audience were seated on straw bales, with the various performances taking place on a farm trailer. Over the years, the look and feel of the series has changed dramatically. The audience these days sit on comfortable seats, inside a specially-made studio. Noson Lawen is recorded at various centres all over Wales and has offered an early stage to some of the biggest talents in Wales.
