= Tymor yr Heliwr =

Studio album by Crys
- Released: 1982
- Genre: Rock
- Label: Sain
- Producer: Myfyr Isaac

Tymor Yr Heliwr is the second album by the Welsh rock band Crys. It was released in 1982 on the Sain record label and was available on LP and Cassette. It is no longer in print.

== Track listing ==
All tracks written by Liam Forde and Crys except "Mae fy Nghalon yn Rhydd", written by Caryl Ifans.

No.	Title	Length
1.	"Pendoncwyr"	3:14
2.	"Yfed Y Nos"	2:40
3.	"Barod am Roc"	3:23
4.	"Cwrdd a Gofid"	4:00
5.	"Rociwch Ymlaen"	4:17
6.	"Mae fy Nghalon yn Rhydd"	5:54
7.	"Y Fedwen"	1:35
8.	"Merched Gwyllt a Gwin"	4:08
9.	"Gwlith y Bore"	5:44

== Personnel ==
- Liam Forde (Vocals, Rhythm Guitar)
- Scott Forde (Bass)
- Nicky Samuel (Drums)
- Alun Morgan (Lead Guitar)
- Caryl Ifans (Backing Vocals)
