= CF10 (EP) =

CF10 EP

EP by Astroid Boys
- Released: 11 November 2016
- Genre: Grime
- Length: 25:23
- Language: English
- Label: Music for Nations

Music video
- "CF10" on YouTube

CF10 is an EP by Cardiff-based grime music band Astroid Boys. Originally released in 2015 on the label Pinky Swear Records, it was later re-released in 2016 when they signed with Music For Nations.

== Track listing ==
Side A

1. "Wake Up" – 3:53
2. "Posted" – 4:20
3. "Brudda" – 3:10

Side B

1. "A48 Blues" – 3:51
2. "Scrambled Eggs" – 3:09
3. "Justice" – 4:11
4. "Slammed 2 Razz" – 2:49
