= Roc Cafe =

Studio album by Crys
- Released: 1995
- Genre: Rock
- Label: Fflach
- Producer: Crys

Roc Cafe is the third album by the Welsh rock band Crys. It was released in 1995 on the Fflach record label as a CD. It is no longer in print.

== Track listing ==
1. Nol i Roc a Rol
2. Gadael fi Lawr
3. Amser yn Nawr
4. Galw Mas
5. Cefnogwyr y Byd
6. Edrych am Nerth
7. Mor Unig
8. Gyd i Chi
9. Sych
10. Breuddwyd Mawr - Rhan 1, Rhan 2
11. Diolch i Chi

== Credits ==
- Liam Forde (Vocals, Rhythm Guitar)
- Scott Forde (Bass)
- Nicky Samuel (Drums)
- Mark Thomas (Lead Guitar)
