= Frances Môn Jones =

Welsh harpist

Frances Môn Jones MBE
- Born: 20 October 1919; Broughton, Wrexham, Wales
- Died: 8 September 2000 (aged 80); Llanfair Caereinion, Wales
- Citizenship: United Kingdom
- Education: Grove Park Grammar School
- Alma mater: Royal Northern College of Music
- Occupations: Harpist; Teacher
- Spouse: Robert Môn Jones (m. 1947; died 1982)

Frances Môn Jones MBE (20 October 1919 – 8 September 2000) was a Welsh harpist and teacher who won three harp competitions and one solo soprano contest at the National Eisteddfod of Wales from 1937 to 1949. She began playing the organ at age 14 before playing the harp. Jones helped W. S. Gwynn Williams to establish the Llangollen International Eisteddfod and played the harp at events. She attended the Royal Northern College of Music from 1955 to 1960 and subsequently retired from performing to teach in schools around the area of her residence.

== Early life ==
On 20 October 1919, Jones was born in Broughton, Wrexham. She was the daughter of David Charles Davies and his wife Mary Jane (née Goodwin). Jones was educated at the local school and later at Grove Park Grammar School. She excelled at Welsh, even though she had no experience of hearing the language at home.

== Career ==
Aged 14, Jones she began playing the organ at Broughton's Pisgah chapel before taking lessons from Alwena Roberts after her Jones' father purchased an erard harp. She won the solo harp competition at the National Eisteddfod of Wales three years in a row from 1937 to 1939. Jones won the solo soprano competition in 1949; she had converted "on stage" in the same year and went on to actively participate in several evangelistic campaigns across Europe and the UK. She had won four times at the National Eisteddfod of Wales. During the Second World War, Jones joined the Gwynn Sisters and aided conductor W. S. Gwynn Williams in founding the Llangollen International Eisteddfod in 1947. She sang penillion to her own harp accompaniment at the Eisteddfod opening ceremony with workers authored by her husband every year from 1954 to 1981. In 1953, Jones was admitted to the Gorsedd under the name "Telynores Brython" before subsequently changing it to "Ffranses Môn" and played the harp frequently at Gorsedd ceremonies from 1957 on. Between 1964 and 1990, she was the Powys Eisteddfod's official harpist.

Jones appeared in Brittany, Germany, the Netherlands, Norway and Spain. She visited the United States for the first time in 1957. Jones had partook in the 27th Annual Welsh Day Celebration in Bangor, Pennsylvania held from 31 August to 1 September at the Lutheran Grove in observation of Welsh institutions and traditions. She went on to participate in a programme held at the Calvary Baptist Church in Pottsville, Pennsylvania on the evening of 4 September. Jones subsequently performed in Vancouver and Los Angeles later in the year. Between 1955 and 1960, she received instruction in music from David Ewart Parry Williams and took lessons from Jean Bell at the Royal Northern College of Music, Manchester. Jones retired from performing and taught in schools around the area of her residence in Llanfair Caereinion. Students whom she taught include Siân James.

She served on the panel of adjudicators at Llangollen with other highly acclaimed musicians from 1978 to 1999. Between 1957 and 1985, Jones was treasurer of the Welsh Folk Song Society. She was made its vice-president in 1985 before becoming its president from 1988 until her death in 2000. Jones was elected honorary president of the Society for the Traditional Instruments of Wales, Clera when it came into being in 1996.

== Personal life ==
From 1947 to 1982, she was married to the Methodist minister and Aberffraw native Robert Môn Jones. Jones was appointed the MBE in 1983 and received the Sir T. H. Parry-Williams Medal at the Anglesey National Eisteddfod in 1999. On 8 September 2000, she died and was subsequently buried at Wrexham Crematorium.

== Legacy ==
Jones was regarded as "one of the foremost ambassadors of traditional Welsh song." She was commemorated by a visit of the National Eisteddfod at her home area of Meifod for an event in 2003. The National Library of Wales holds an October 1961 letter from Jones to Bryn Tirion in its Maxwell Fraser Papers collection. People's Collection Wales holds a photograph of Jones in its collection and an entry of her is included in the Dictionary of Welsh Biography.
