= Robin Huw Bowen =

British musician (born 1957)

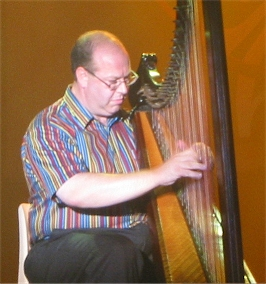
Robin Huw Bowen on stage at the Festival Interceltique de Lorient in 2002

Robin Huw Bowen playing Morfa'r Frenhines (The Queen's Marsh)

Robin Huw Bowen (born 1957) is a player of the Welsh triple harp, known in Welsh as Telyn Deires (English: Three-row Harp). He was awarded the Glyndŵr Award in 2000.

Born into the Welsh community in Liverpool, England, into a family originally from Anglesey, Bowen learned to play the Celtic Harp while at school, inspired by the Breton harper, Alan Stivell. In 1979 he received a degree in Welsh Language and Literature from the University of Wales, Aberystwyth.

He was first exposed to the Welsh Triple Harp by two members of the Welsh traditional music group Ar Log, brothers Dafydd and Gwyndaf Roberts. They had learned to play the instrument from Nansi Richards, one of the last traditional Welsh folk harpists from the previous generation.

Although he regularly performs as a soloist, Bowen joined the Welsh traditional group Mabsant in 1986 and later joined Cusan Tân. In 1996, he along with Stephen Rees and others, formed the society for traditional musical instrument of Wales, Clera. Since 1998 he has been a member of the Welsh 'super-group' Crasdant. In 2004 he and four other Triple Harpists formed Rhes Ganol, the first Welsh Triple Harp 'Choir' to exist since that of Llanover Hall during its heyday at the beginning of the twentieth century.

Robin Huw Bowen worked for many years at the National Library of Wales in Aberystwyth. While there he discovered several old collections of Welsh tunes and arrangements for harp, some of which have since been published. His research has also drawn on living sources, in particular the harpist Eldra Jarman (1917–2000), a great-granddaughter of John Roberts (Telynor Cymru).

In 2015, Bowen was allegedly banned from a branch of HSBC in Aberystwyth, a largely Welsh-speaking area, for complaining that the bank gave precedence to the English language in its signage.

== Albums ==
- Trwy'r Weiar(Through the Wire) (1987) with Mabsant
- Telyn Berseiniol Fy Ngwlad (Sweet Harp of My Land) (1991)
- Cusan Tân (Kiss of Fire) (1992) with Cusan Tân
- Hela'r Draenog (Hunting the Hedgehog) (1994)
- Cerddoriaeth Telyn Cymru (Harp Music Of Wales) (1995)
- Esgair (The Ridge) (1996) with Cusan Tân
- Hen Aelwyd (Old Hearth) (1999)
- Crasdant (1999) with Crasdant
- Nos Sadwrn Bach (Not Yet Saturday) (2001) with Crasdant
- Yn y Gwaed (In the Blood) (2004) with Rhes Ganol
- Dwndwr (The Great Noise) (2005) with Crasdant
- Y Ffordd i Aberystwyth (The Road to Aberystwyth) (2007)
- Harp Music of Wales (Cerddoriaeth Telyn Cymru) (2011)
- Iaith Enaid (2015)
