= Nansi Richards =

Welsh harpist (1888–1979)

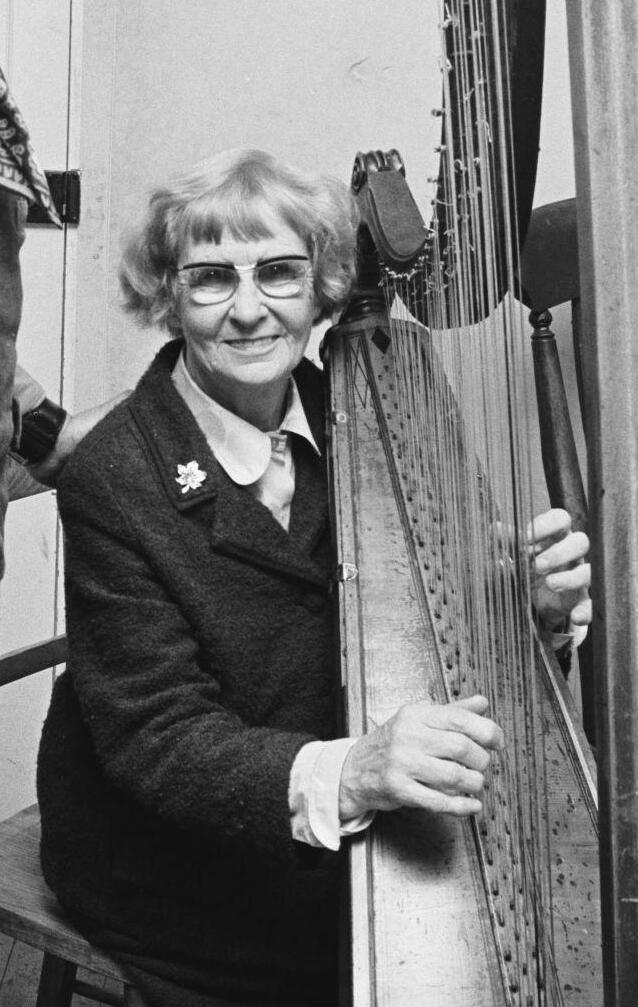
Nansi Richards in 1971

Yr Hen Glochydd
Nansi Richards performing Cerdd Dant with Emrys Jones

Nansi Richards Jones MBE (14 May 1888 – 21 December 1979) was a Welsh harpist, sometimes known as the "Queen of the Harp" or by her bardic name "Telynores Maldwyn".

== Early life and education ==
Jane Ann "Nansi" Richards was born at Pen-y-bont-fawr, Montgomeryshire. An expert on both the triple and pedal harps, she always maintained that the greatest influences on her life were her father Thomas Richards, the Kale (Welsh Roma) who stayed on their farm, and Tom Lloyd (Telynor Ceiriog, 1848–1917), who taught her to play the harp. She also studied at the Guildhall School of Music in London, with harpist John Thomas.

== Musical career ==
She won the National Eisteddfod harp competition three times in succession. After a year at the Guildhall School of Music, she toured with American comedian "Happy" Fanny Fields. The two young women devised tricks for Nansi to do while playing the harp, such as playing with her back turned, or playing two harps simultaneously.

Richards was appointed Royal Harpist to the Prince of Wales in 1911, a title she held until her death; the role remained vacant until it was reinstated in 2000. She was awarded the MBE in 1967. In 1972 she published an autobiography Cwpwrdd Nansi.

Richards is credited as teaching traditional triple-harp technique to several musicians, including entertainer Ryan Davies, Dafydd and Gwyndaf Roberts of the folk band Ar Log, and triple harpist Llio Rydderch.

== Kellogg's cockerel ==
A frequently told, but possibly apocryphal, story about Richards involves one of Richards' overseas trips, when she visited the home of corn flakes manufacturer Will Kellogg, who was looking for a marketing idea. Richards suggested the cockerel (later named Cornelius Rooster), inspired by a pun on the name Kellogg and the Welsh word "ceiliog", meaning "cockerel".

== Personal life and legacy ==
in 1928 Nansi Richards married Cecil Maurice Jones (1902–1963); they settled in Tremadog. She spent her last years in Parc, Cecil's home village near Bala. She died late in 1979, age 91. Her remains were buried in the churchyard at St Melangell's Church, Pennant Melangell near Llangynog.

There is an annual Nansi Richards Harp Scholarship competition for young harpists.

A recording of Nansi Richards playing "Pen Rhaw" was included on the 2000 album The Rough Guide to Music of Wales.

In 2015, Nansi, a play about the life of Nansi Richards, written by Angharad Price, was staged by Theatr Genedlaethol Cymru at the National Eisteddfod.

== Discography ==
- The Art of Nansi Richards – Celfyddyd Telynores Maldwyn (Qualiton Records SQUAD115, 1973)
- The Bells of Aberdovey (Folktrax FTX-351, 1980)
- Telynores Maldwyn Brenhines Y Delyn – Queen Of The Welsh Harp (Sain SCD2382, 2003)
