= Ar Log =

Welsh folk band

2005 line-up of Ar Log

Ar Log (Welsh for "for hire") are a Welsh folk band. They have performed since the 1970s and are recognized as the first professional Welsh folk band. They perform instrumental music and songs in Welsh.

== Career ==
Twll yn y To (1996)

The original 1976 members were Dave Burns (guitar), Dafydd Roberts (triple harp, flute), Gwyndaf Roberts (knee harp and bass) and Iolo Jones (fiddle). The four individuals were brought together by the Welsh Committee of the Lorient Festival who were eager that a Welsh traditional group should represent the nation at that year's Interceltique festival in Lorient. Here they met The Dubliners, who suggested that they should stay together and turn professional. When they arrived in Brittany they had to think of a name and to reflect their status they called themselves Ar Log which means 'For Hire'. During this period, the group released the first of several eponymous albums: Ar Log.

In 1978 Iolo Jones left, and then in 1979 Dave Burns left. This could have led to the break-up of the group but the group successfully advertised for a new guitarist (Geraint Glynne Davies) and fiddler (Graham Pritchard).

It is notable that Ar Log's members are drawn from across the diverse geographic and cultural regions of Wales - and from differing musical backgrounds. Dafydd and Gwyndaf were brought up in Llwyngwril, Merionethshire in the northwestern heartland of the Welsh language. They were immersed in the tradition of Welsh folk harping by their tutor, Nansi Richards ("Telynores Maldwyn", the harpist of Maldwyn). Nansi subsequently endorsed Ar Log's first album. Iolo Jones is originally from Caerphilly, a former coal mining town in south Wales. Iolo was originally a classically trained fiddler but succeeded in crossing over to the folk genre. Graham Pritchard was also successful in combining, throughout his career, the complex harmonies of Ar Log with the lighter fiddle style employed by Mynediad am Ddim of which he was also a member.

The group's lead singers also provide contrasting styles. The original singer, Dave Burns, is from Cardiff, where one is likely to hear Irish session music as much as Welsh. Burns made the transition between Ar Log and the Hennessys, a south Wales group singing in the English language. In comparison, Geraint Glynne Davies is a Welsh speaker from the north. His main performing influence was the rock group Queen. Geraint played a 'roundback' guitar with a distinctive tinny edge. In the absence of drums or percussion, Geraint's energetic guitar style contributed at least as much to the rhythm as to the harmony of the group.

The quartet of Geraint, Graham, Dafydd and Gwyndaf recorded two albums, Ar Log II and Ar Log III. The former album contains perhaps the best example of the Roberts' brothers harping: "Merch Megan/Wyres Megan" and "Llydaw" are two classic triple harp arrangements. These contrast with sea shanties of J. Glyn Davies ("Fflat Huw Puw" and "Rownd yr Horn").

In 1983, Ar Log's horizons expanded substantially with the addition of Stephen ('Steffan') Rees (accordion, fiddle and keyboards). Ar Log's instrumental polymath, Stephen went on to lead an academic career in music. Rees played clarinet on one track ("Ciosg Talysarn"). Pritchard left in 1983.

By this time, Ar Log had become particularly associated with Dafydd Iwan, a long-standing figure in the Welsh national movement. In 1982 and 1983, Ar Log embarked on two tours with Iwan. The first tour 'Taith 700' was to mark the 700th anniversary of the death of Llywelyn ap Gruffudd in 1282. The tours produced two albums (Rhwng Hwyl a Thaith and Yma o Hyd). The synthesiser and accordion of Stephen Rees came to the fore for the first time on these two recordings. On some tracks, the synth would comprise simple, sustained background chords (e.g. "Dail y Teim"). On others, synth would be used to specific effect e.g. harpsichord sound ("Abergeni") or trumpet fanfare ("Yma o Hyd"). The accordion medley on the Yma o Hyd album with its proliferation of triplet notes remains perhaps the most complex set performed on Welsh accordion to date.

In 1983, the group recorded an all-instrumental album, Meillionen (=clover leaf), aimed primarily at the Welsh folk dance community. Dafydd Roberts is a skillful clog-dancer. The sleeve notes of the album also included a booklet of dance steps for the various sets on the album. Meillionen is the only non-eponymous album in the set.

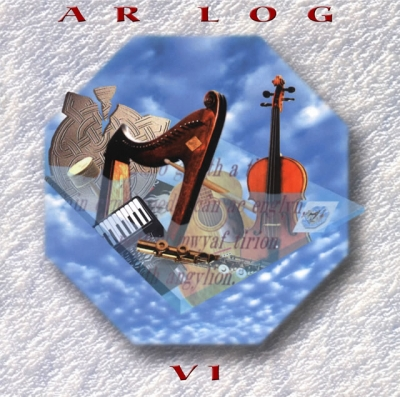
Album cover for Ar Log VI

Ar Log IV was recorded in 1984. Ar Log's ability to convert simple tunes into sophisticated harmonies is demonstrated in tracks such as "Cerrig y Rhyd".

By 1988, Iolo Jones had returned as a second fiddler. Ar Log V probably remains the group's most prominent album in terms of blending the synthesiser into the traditional elements. The group also rejoined Dafydd Iwan in 1988 for a celebration of the singer's quarter-centennial on the road. However, by now, Ar Log had essentially become a part-time operation, as the group's members had found full-time employment elsewhere.

In 1996, Ar Log celebrated its anniversary by recalling all of the group's members, past and present, to record Ar Log VI. A book was compiled by Lyn Ebenezer to mark the group's anniversary. An enduring aspect of Ar Log VI was the adoption by Ar Log of a drummer and bassist in some selected concerts. The new style brings Ar Log into a more folk-rock style. Stephen Rees subsequently left the group and became a founder member of Crasdant. Geraint Cynan, a prolific composer and music arranger, joined on keyboards. Ar Log has taken Welsh music to over twenty countries on three continents and was the first professional Welsh traditional folk group. They are still gigging as a seven-piece and, in 2016, they celebrated 40 years with concerts in Wales, Germany and Ireland.

In August 2018, Ar Log released Ar Log VII at The National Eisteddfod in Cardiff - 40 years almost to the day after they released their first album, Ar Log at The National Eisteddfod in 1978.

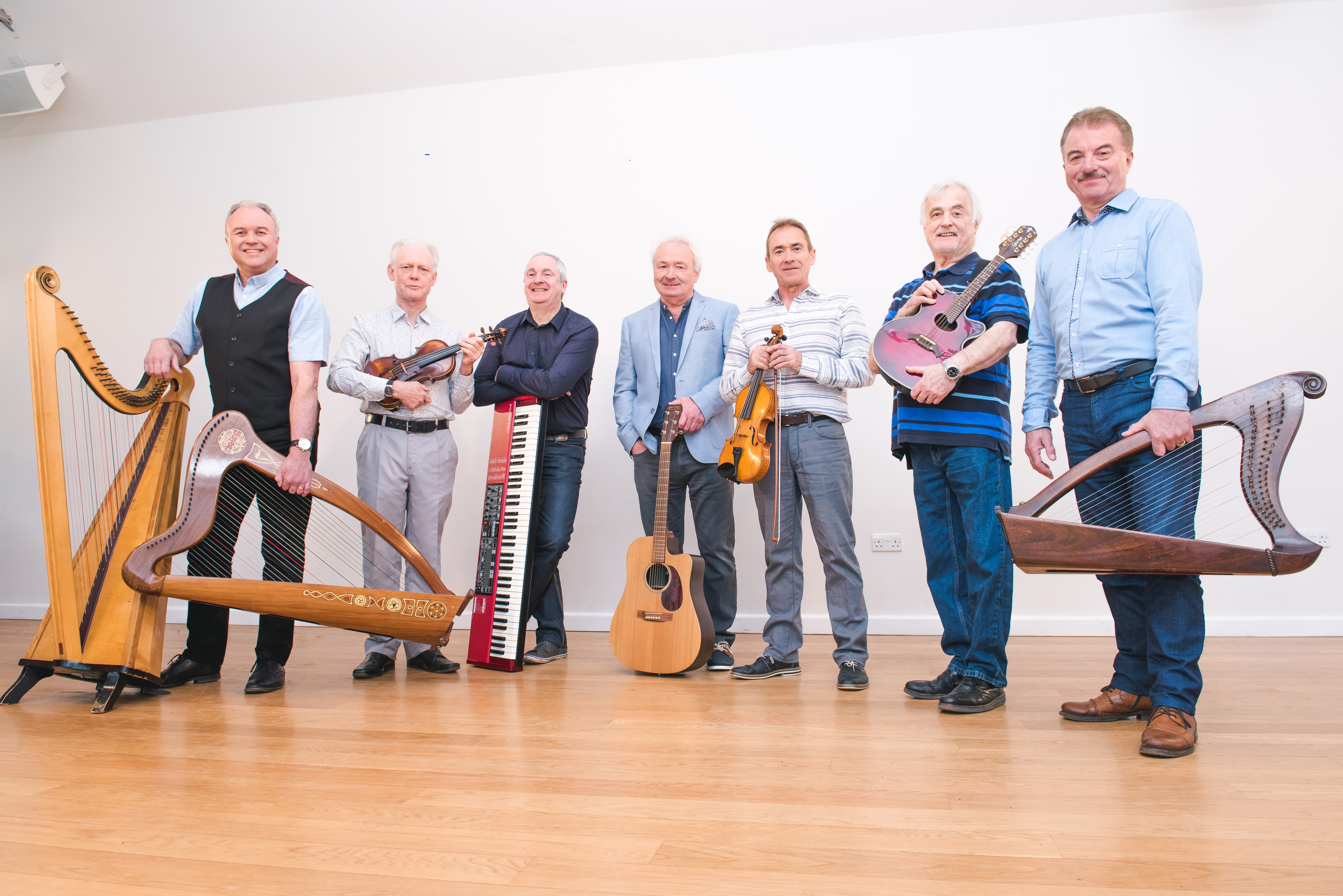
Ar Log in 2018

In June 2025, Ar Log announced that a new album would release early 2026 in celebration of the band's 50th anniversary. The album will be titled "Ar Log VIII". On 9 November 2025, Dafydd Roberts made a post on the Ar Log Facebook page stating that the album would release 9 January 2026. The album would also be the band's first since the passing of one of their lead singers and founders of Ar Log, Dave Burns, who also was in Welsh Folk group The Hennessys. The band also stated that they will go on tour in 2026, starting from 24 January, with two special appearances with Dafydd Iwan, which will also be Iwan's last performances with the folk group after he announced his retirement back in August 2025.

In 2004, Dafydd Roberts became Chief Executive of the Welsh record label Sain, which had released several of Ar Log's albums.

== Discography ==
=== Singles ===
Name	Year	Label
The Carmarthen Oak	1980	Dingle's Records

=== Albums ===
Name	Year	Label
Ar Log	1978	Dingle's Records
Ar Log II	1980	Dingle's Records
Ar Log III	1981	Dingle's Records
Meillionen	1983	Dingle's Records
Pedwar IV	1984	Recordiau Ar Log
Ar Log V	1988	Sain
Ar Log VI	1996	Sain
Saith VII	2018	Sain
Y Ddwy Chwaer/The Two Sisters	2024	Sain
Ar Log VIII	2026	Sain

=== Compilations ===
Name	Year	Label
o IV i V	1991	Sain
Ar Log: I-III: 1976-1981	2001	Sain
Goreuon Ar Log	2007	Sain

=== Work with Dafydd Iwan ===
Name	Year	Label	Type
Cerddwn Ymlaen	1982	Sain	Single
Rhwng Hwyl a Thaith	1982	Sain	Album
Yma o Hyd	1983	Sain	Album
Rhwng Hwyl a Thaith ac Yma o Hyd	1993	Sain	Compilation
Yma o Hyd - Cwpan y Byd (Ft. Y Wal Goch)	2022	Sain	Single

== Albums ==
=== The Beginning: Ar Log, Ar Log II and Ar Log III ===
==== Ar Log ====
Ar Log are known for their eponymous (self-titled) albums. Their first album, "Ar Log" features many classic Welsh folk songs, such as "Ar Lan y Môr" and "Tra Bo Dau". The album might also have been renamed in 2005, as many sources and websites, such as LyricFind have the album titled as "Original Celtic Music" released in 2005. The album might've been renamed for Germany as its country is labelled as "Germany" on Discogs and the album is released under AVES, a German music label, however, the release date is still 1978.

The album was released in 1978 and was Ar Log's first solo studio album. It was released under the folk label "Dingle's Records", a folk label based in London

===== Tracklisting =====
Track No.	Title
1	Rali Twm Siôn/Ymdaith Gwŷr Dyfnaint
2	Y Blewyn Glas
3	Difyrrwch Corbet O Ynys Maengwyn/Difyrrwch Gwŷr Dolgellau/Ymdaith Caerffili/Tŷ Coch Caerdydd
4	Ar Lan Y Môr
5	Dainty Davey/Hoffedd Ap Hywel
6	Y Gwcw Fach
7	Hafoty Fraich Ddu/Y Gelynnen/Y Lili
8	Yn Harbwr Corc
9	Breuddwyd Y Frenhines/Per Oslef
10	Cerdd Y Gog Lwydlas
11	Clychau Aberdyfi/Bugail Aberdyfi
12	Ffidl Ffadl/Y Delyn Newydd
13	Tra Bo Dau
14	Glan Brân/Ymgyrch-Dôn Y Waenlwyd

When this album first came out, it was well received by the Welsh speaking population. The album also has an average rating of 4.12/5 on Discogs with 17 ratings. The album is currently not available anywhere officially apart from on Amazon to buy, however, someone has uploaded the full album on YouTube.

Available on	Year available	Notes	Ref.
YouTube	2017	Available unofficially	

==== Ar Log II ====
Ar Log II (or Ar Log 2) is Ar Log's second album featuring more Welsh Folk songs. The album was released in 1980, and features "Llongau Caernarfon" which also featured in their single, released in the same year "The Carmarthen Oak". This album was once again released under Dingle's Records.

===== Tracklisting =====
Track No.	Title
1	Sesiwn Yng Nghymru/Môn
2	Fflat Huw Puw/Pibddawns Gwŷr Wrecsam
3	Hiraeth
4	Wyres Megan/Merch Megan
5	Lisa Lân
6	Rownd Yr Horn
7	Caer Rhun/Nyth Y Gôg/Nyth Y Gwcw
8	Llydaw
9	Llongau Caernarfon
10	Y Ferch O Blwy' Penderyn/Tros Y Garreg
11	Bugeilio'r Gwenith Gwyn
12	Dafydd Ifan Tomas/Gwŷr Gwent/Cwrw Da
13	Santiana

The album was again, well received by the Welsh speakers and has an average rating of 4.64/5 on Discogs with 11 ratings. The album came to streaming platforms in late June and early July 2025.

Available on	Year available	Notes	Ref.
Apple Music	2025		
Deezer	2025		
Spotify	2025		
YouTube; YouTube Music	2025		

==== Ar Log III ====
Ar Log III (or Ar Log 3) is Ar Log's third eponymous album and their third album in their career. It was released in 1981. This album was also under Dingle's Records.

===== Tracklisting =====
Track No.	Title
1	Y Gŵr A'i Farch/Pant Corlan Yr Ŵyn
2	Y Gelynnen/Cainc Y Datgeiniad
3	Llwyd Y Gwyrch/Pedwar Post Y Gwely/Ceiliog Y Grug
4	Dau Rosyn Coch
5	Tôn Garol/Aderyn Du
6	Yr Hen Dderwen Ddu
7	Tŷ Bach Twt/Mopsi Dôn
8	Seren Syw
9	Merch Y Melinydd
10	Y Pren Gwyrddlas/Beth Yw'r Haf I Mi
11	Wrth Y Ffynnon
12	Ymdaith Sir Feirionydd

The album received 10 ratings on Discogs and has an average rating of 4.3/5. The album came to music streaming platforms on 24 July 2025.

Available on	Year available	Notes	Ref.
Apple Music	2025		
Deezer	2025		
Spotify	2025		
YouTube; YouTube Music	2025		
