= Astroid Boys =

British punk rock group

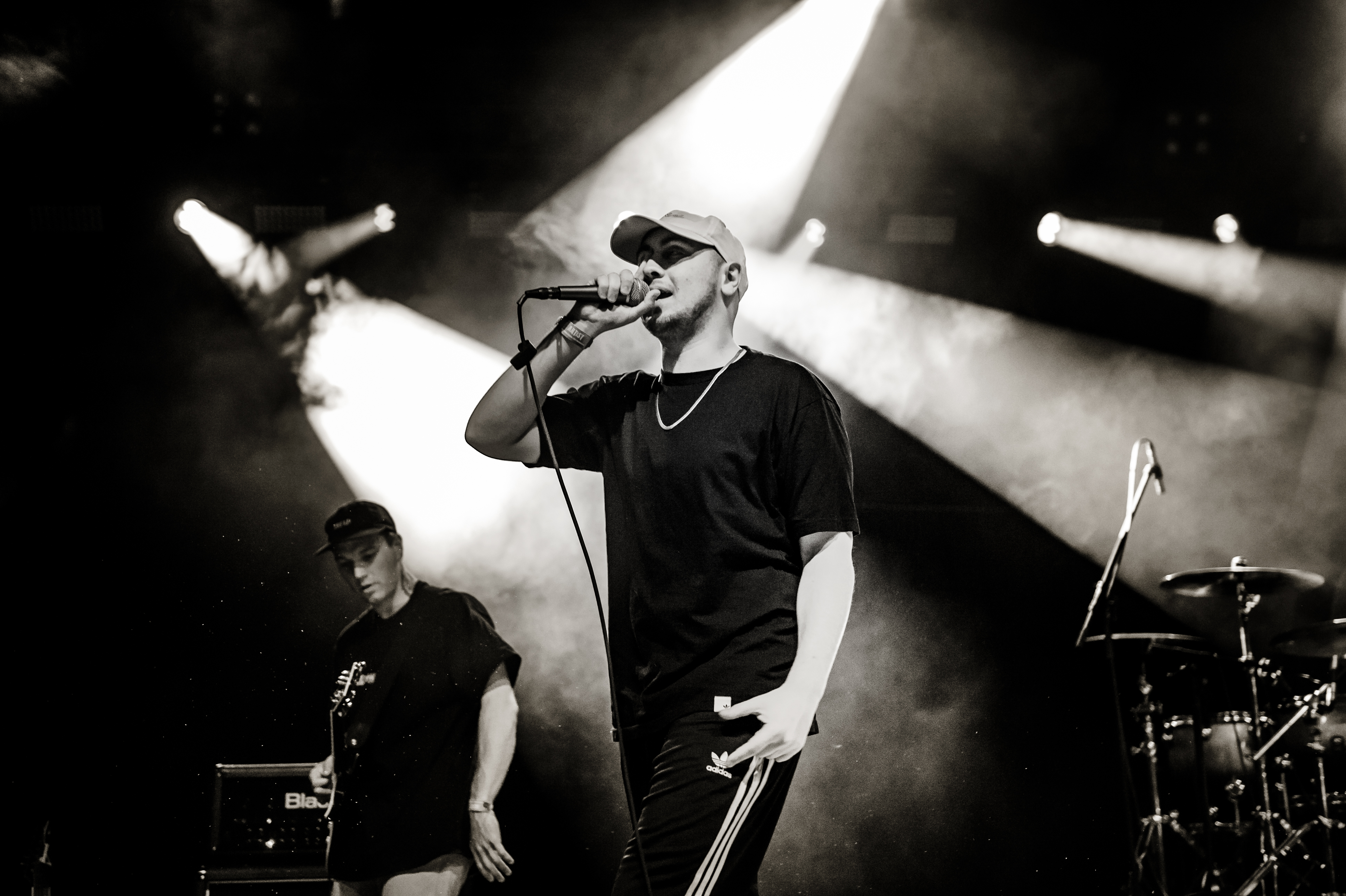
- Astroid Boys performing at Impericon Festival 2017 [Oberhausen]

Background information
- Origin: Cardiff, Wales
- Genres: Grime; hardcore punk
- Years active: 2012–2019 (hiatus)
- Label: Music for Nations
- Members: Benjamin 'Benji Wild' Kendell
- Past members: Phillip 'Traxx' Davies; Elliot 'Dellux' Brussalis; Ricardo "DJ Comfort" Banks; Harry ‘Big H’ Williams Kyle Deek

Astroid Boys are a Welsh rap rock band from Cardiff, whose music has been called a mix of hardcore punk and grime music.

== Career ==
=== 2012–2015 ===
Started in 2012 by co-frontman Traxx, the intention was to create something that merged his past as a punk kid with his transition into grime in his late teens. Calling upon an old friend in DJ Comfort, Traxx was able to get the project off the ground with small hip-hop shows around Cardiff. DJ Dellux was already making a name for himself in Cardiff, having his own youth centre radio show at the age of 14, producing beats, and agreed to join Astroid Boys. Their hardcore hustling lead to them playing raves around Cardiff, where they frequently performed alongside ‘rival’ MC Benji. It became apparent that Traxx and Benji worked well together, creating their trademark co-frontman set-up. Long-time friend – and metal fan - Harry was recruited to provide live drums, and since then the gang has had an ever-extending crew, both live and in the studio. In its early days the band was supported by the Cardiff youth project Grassroots, which also helped to launch the careers of Cerys Matthews, Stereophonics, Super Furry Animals and the Manic Street Preachers, amongst others.

In August 2012, NME announced that Astroid Boys would be playing at London's Freeze Festival in October that year on a bill which would include Mark Ronson, Grandmaster Flash and Zane Lowe.

In April 2015, Astroid Boys were featured on Kerrang!'s shortlist of "ten killer new bands" competing for a stage slot at that year's Slam Dunk Festival. In November that same year, the band was amongst 35 successful Welsh musical applicants to receive financial support from BBC Cymru Wales and Arts Council of Wales via the Launchpad fund created as part of the organisations' joint Horizons scheme. A month later, they were winners in the online Cardiff Music Awards, taking the prizes in four categories: Best band, Best live act, Best music video (for "Posted") and Best single/EP (for "CF10").

=== 2016 ===
In January 2016, Wales Online's David Owens included Astroid Boys in his article "Sound of Wales 2016: 12 acts who deserve your attention over the coming year".

Astroid Boys have performed at Reading and Leeds Festivals, Download Festival and T in the Park, as well as festivals in mainland Europe, including Block Party Festival (Germany) and With Full Force Festival (Germany).

In 2016 they joined Music for Nations, the first band to be signed by the label in over ten years, and chosen to be the flagship band for the label's re-launch which includes a re-release of ‘Bacon Dream’ and ‘CF10’ on clear vinyl, with their debut full-length album following in Spring 2017. The band will also be releasing live footage from their performance on the Radio 1Xtra Stage at Reading Festival 2016, which NME blogger Jordan Bassett called an "exciting, uncompromising show".

In December 2016, their track "Dusted" was chosen as the official theme song for the WWE United Kingdom Championship Tournament, which took place early the following year. The track has gone on to become the official theme song of the WWE UK brand.

=== 2017 ===
In January 2017, Astroid Boys were the subject of BBC Radio 4's documentary Generation Grime which followed them on their most recent UK tour. Astroid Boys joined Enter Shikari on their arena tour of the UK and Europe tour in November and December 2017.

=== 2018–2019 ===
Astroid Boys have toured with Hollywood Undead as well as embarking on their most successful headline tour to date. They have also supported Ice-T's band Body Count in that summer. In mid 2018, it was announced that Traxx would part ways with the band to pursue other projects.

By the end of 2018, Benji was the only founding member in the band, bringing in a new lineup for the last remaining shows. Benji has since put out a (now deleted) tweet stating that now all original members have left, Astroid Boys will disband as to focus on his solo career and family. On 10 December, it was announced that Astroid Boys would be on the line-up for an upcoming show in support of Welsh independence. The concert took place on 15 February 2019 and included acts such as Charlotte Church, Gruff Rhys and Boy Azooga.

On 6 January 2019, Benji announced that after finishing the next tour the project will go on "indefinite" hiatus.

== Discography ==
=== Albums ===
Title	Details
Broke	Released: 29 September 2017; Labels: Music for Nations; Formats: DD

=== Extended plays ===
Title	Details	Notes
Bacon Dream	Released: 5 September 2013; Labels: Pinky Swear Records; Formats: 12-inch, CD, DD	Reissued on 11 November 2016 by Music for Nations
CF10	Released: 23 April 2015; Label: Pinky Swear Records; Formats: 12-inch, CD, DD	Reissued on 11 November 2016 by Music for Nations
