= Triple harp =

Welsh musical instrument

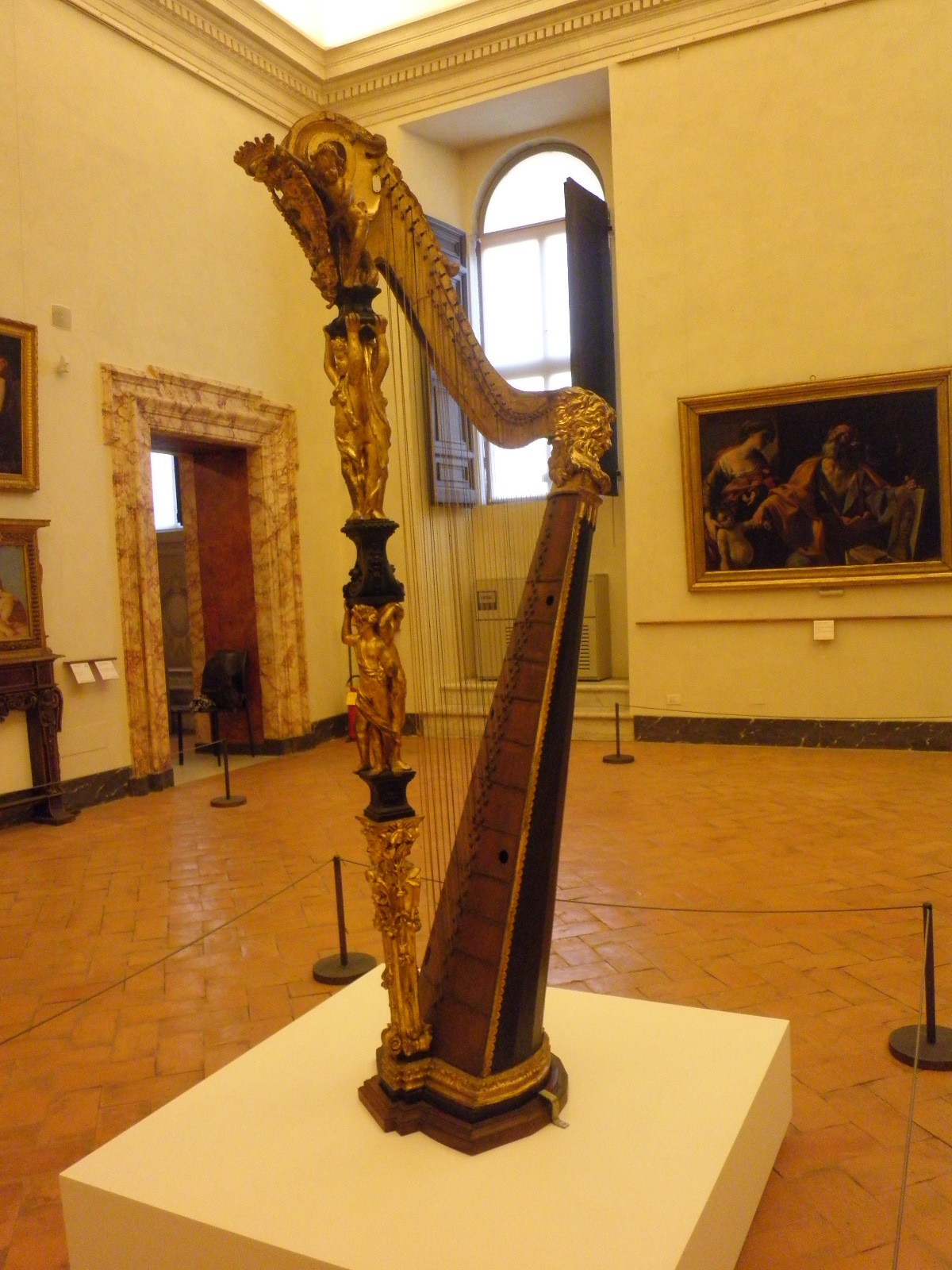
- Italian triple harp
- Other names: Welsh triple harp, telyn deires
- Classification: string
- Hornbostel–Sachs classification: 3.2.2 (harps)
- Developed: 17th century

Musicians
- Nansi Richards, Ar Log, Robin Huw Bowen

The triple harp is a type of multi-course harp employing three parallel rows of strings instead of the more common single row. One common version is the Welsh triple harp (Welsh: telyn deires), used today mainly among players of traditional Welsh folk music.

== Italian arpa tripla ==
The triple harp originated in 16th-century Italy. To enable chromatic playing required by late-Renaissance music, a second row of strings containing the pentatonic scale (the accidentals) was added in parallel to the first row, which contained the diatonic scale. These harps were called arpa doppia or double harp and allowed for fully chromatic playing for the first time in the history of the harp. Later, a second diatonic row of strings was added on the other side of the pentatonic row of strings, creating the arpa tripla or triple harp. Double and triple harps continued to be the norm throughout the Baroque era in Italy, Spain, and France and were employed both as solo and continuo instruments.

The most famous surviving example of an Italian triple harp is the Barberini harp. The instrument was built between 1605 and 1620 for the Barberini family and was played by Marco Marazzoli. It features prominently in Giovanni Lanfranco's painting Venus plays the harp.

== Welsh telyn deires ==
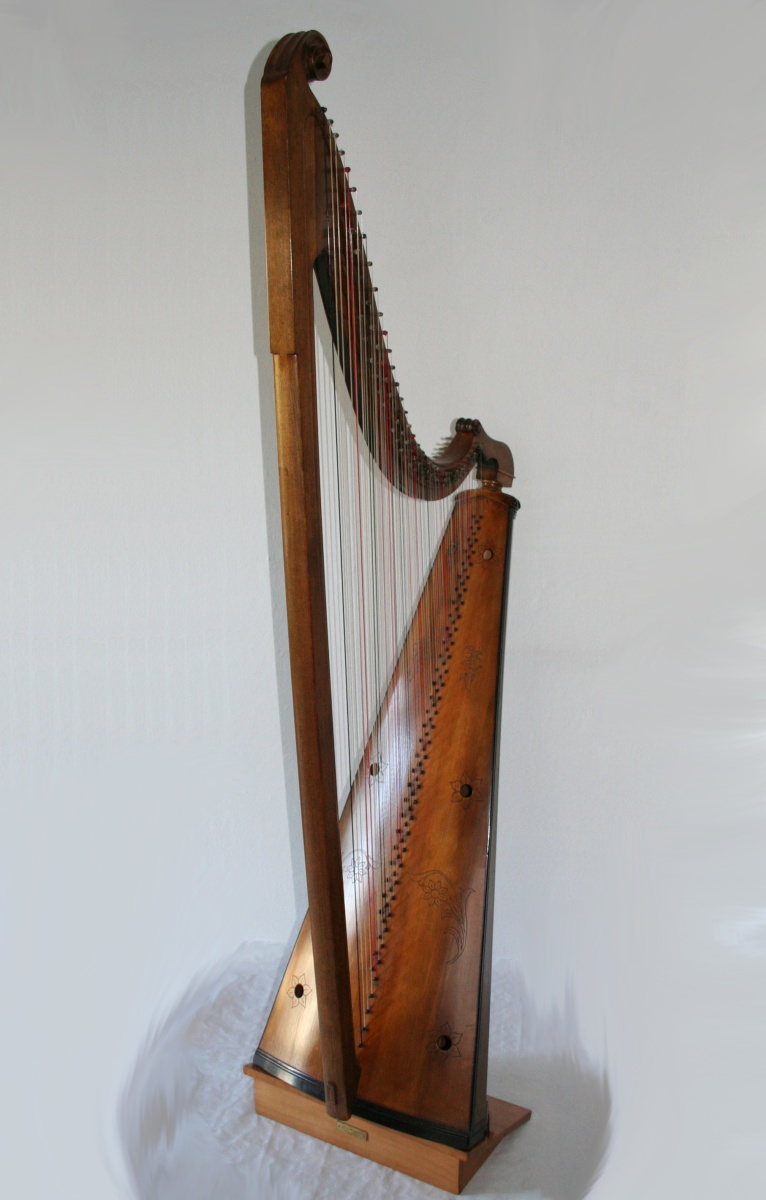
Welsh triple harp by Tim Hampson

=== History ===
Triple harp
Dafydd y Garreg Wen played by Robin Huw Bowen

The triple harp appeared in the British Isles early in the 17th century. In 1629, the French harpist Jean le Flelle was appointed "musician for the harp" at the court of King Charles I. Flelle played the Italian triple harp with gut strings.

The triple harp was quickly adopted by the Welsh harpers living in London during the 17th century. It was so popular that by the beginning of the 18th century the triple harp became generally known as the "Welsh harp". Charles Evans was the first mentioned Welsh triple harpist. He was appointed harper to the court in 1660, where his official title was ‘His Majesty's harper for the Italian harp’. As late as the 1680s, Talbot was describing the triple harp as the English harp, and the Welsh harp he describes appears to be a large, diatonic gothic-style harp, with bray pins.

A description of the Welsh triple harp is given by the harpist John Parry (Bardd Alaw) (1776–1851) in the preface to the second volume of his collection, The Welsh Harper (London 1839):

The compass of the triple harp is about five octaves, or thirty-seven strings in the principal row, which is on the side played by the right hand, called the bass row. The middle row, which produces the flats and sharps, consists of thirty-four strings; and the treble, or left hand row, numbers twenty-seven strings. The outside rows are tuned in unison, and always in the diatonic scale, that is, in the regular and natural scale of tones and semitones, as a peal of eight bells is tuned.

When it is necessary to change the key, for instance, from C to G, all the F's in the outside rows are made sharp by raising them half a tone. Again, to change from C to F, every B in the outside rows is made flat, by lowering them by a semitone. When an accidental sharp or flat is required, the performer inserts a finger between two of the outer strings, and finds it in the middle row. Many experiments have been made, with a view of obviating the necessity of tuning the instrument every time a change in the key occurred. Brass rings were fixed near the comb, but those rattled and jarred. Every attempt failed until the invention of the pedal harp.

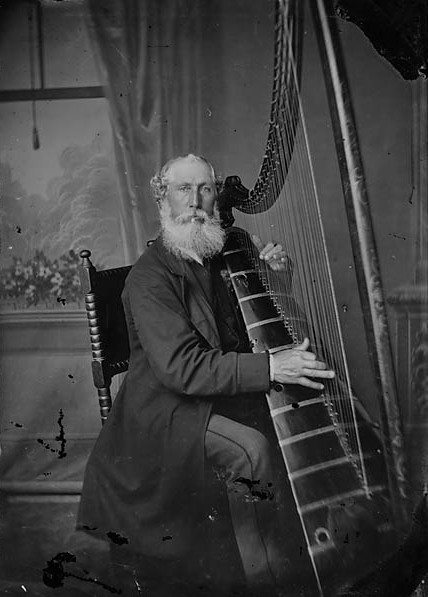
Mr. Roberts of Newtown, Powys playing a triple harp, c. 1875

The skill of harp making in Wales had all but been lost for some 60 years until John Weston Thomas (MBE), a talented wood and metal worker, revived the craft, making Celtic, chromatic and triple harps until his death in 1992. A memorial prize, "Tlws Coffa John Weston Thomas" was subsequently instigated at the National Eisteddfod, to encourage competition in the traditional folk style. He passed on his skills to three apprentices: Allan Shiers, Brian Blackmore and Alun Thomas, his son.

Alun still makes triple and Celtic harps in his workshop in Fishguard. Brian Blackmore no longer makes triple harps, but Allan Shiers has continued the tradition in Wales and founded Teifi Harps in Llandysul, Ceredigion.

=== Playing techniques ===
Among the most important and characteristic playing techniques for the Welsh triple harp is that of unisons or "Split doubling". The effect of unisons is obtained by playing the same note on both the outside rows using the right and left hands in rapid succession. Thus a progression of e.g., C-D-F-E, is achieved by playing CC-DD-FF-EE.

From medieval times Welsh harpists played with the harp placed on the left shoulder, contrary to continental practice.

=== Modern players ===
After the early 20th century, triple harps were almost completely abandoned in Wales in favour of the modern pedal harp. Preservation of the instrument and the playing style has been attributed to Nansi Richards (1888–1979), who learnt to play from Romani harpists in the Bala area at the turn of the century.

Subsequently, Nansi Richards was the harp teacher of the brothers Dafydd and Gwyndaf Roberts. The brothers went on to become founder members of Wales' most prominent folk group, Ar Log. While both brothers are proficient triple harpists, it became customary in the Ar Log line-up for Dafydd to play triple harp (and flute), with Gwyndaf playing the knee harp and clarsach (and bass guitar).

Today's leading exponent of the triple harp include Robin Huw Bowen, who was influenced by the music of Ar Log to the extent that he switched to the triple harp. Llio Rhydderch, another of Nansi Richard's pupils, has concentrated on teaching a new generation of as many young harpers as possible. A triple harp group called Rhes Ganol (Middle Row) was formed in 2000.

Other triple harpists include Rhiain Bebb, Huw Roberts, Gareth Swindail-Parry, Steffan Thomas, Wyn Thomas, Eleri Turner, Elonwy Wright, Carwyn Tywyn, a long-standing street busker, Sioned Webb and Bethan Nia. The triple harp is also played by a minority of classical harpists in Wales, including Angharad Evans, Elinor Bennett, Meinir Heulyn, Eleri Darkins and Cerys Hafana.

Some non-Welsh players perform on the instrument, freeing it from total connection with the Welsh repertoire, which actually consists of 'art music' variations on Welsh tunes. These players notably include Maria Christina Cleary, Cheryl Ann Fulton, Maximilian Ehrhardt, Frances Kelly, Mike Parker, Robin Ward and Fiona Katie Widdop, who has worked with the BBC on some special projects including different designs for the harp and the design and manufacture of a quad harp which she has developed alongside her husband David Widdop.

Modern composers who have written for the triple harp include Richard Barrett.

== Sources ==
- Bayer, C.W., The Historical Methods of the Celtic Harp: The Ancient British Small Harp, the Diaronic Welsh Bray Harp and the Irish Clairseeach. Purple Mountain Press, 1991. ISBN 0-9628890-0-8
- Price, William. "Harps, Bards and the Gwerin". 2000. In Broughton, Simon and Ellingham, Mark with McConnachie, James and Duane, Orla (Ed.), World Music, Vol. 1: Africa, Europe and the Middle East. Rough Guides Ltd, Penguin Books. ISBN 1-85828-636-0
- Sanger, Keith, Tree of Strings, Crann Nan Teud: A History of the Harp in Scotland, Kenmore Music 1991. ISBN 0-9511204-3-3
- Thomas, John, History of the Harp from the Earliest Period Down to the Present Day. Library reprints, 2001. ISBN 0-7222-6068-7
