= Hugh Pugh (sailor) =

Welsh mariner

Hugh Pugh (1794 or 1795 – 10 August 1865), was a legendary Welsh mariner.

Pugh was the captain of a 60-ton "flat" named the Ann of Liverpool, which traded between Runcorn and Caernarfon. His exploits were recorded by John Glyn Davies in the ballad Fflat Huw Puw. The ship was wrecked off Barmouth in 1858, but Pugh survived and retired to Caernarfon and later to Llanidan, where he died.

== Sources ==
- Welsh Biography Online
