= Lemfreck =

Welsh rapper

Lemarl Freckleton (born c. 1994) is a Welsh rapper and hip-hop artist, who performs under the name Lemfreck (sometimes styled L E M F R E C K). He won the 2024 Welsh Music Prize and has been nominated for a BAFTA Cymru.

== Background ==
Freckleton grew up in the St Julians area of Newport, south Wales. He subsequently moved to Bristol and eventually based himself in Brixton, south London.

== Music ==
According to Bill Cummings of God Is in the TV, "Lemfreck’s music skirts the lines of hip-hop, ragga influences grooves and gospel, carrying with it his unmistakable stamp and unique voice, forged from his upbringing and the poverty and injustice in his community". He has been compared to rappers Skepta and Slowthai.

Lemfreck writes quickly and initially self-produced his music. In 2021 he released an album, The Pursuit, then singles including Closer and Play with Silver. Then an EP titled Blood and Sweat and Fears.

Lemfreck played two gigs at The Social in London (30 August) and Cardiff (2 September) in 2023 to preview his new album, 'Blood, Sweat and Fears'. He had been feeling he was at war with everything and the aim of the album was to find peace. 'Blood' signified community.

In October 2024 Lemfreck won the 2024 Welsh Music Prize for 'Blood, Sweat and Fears', praised for its "vision and ambition". The album was also nominated at the inaugural Black Welsh Music Awards in October 2025.
