= Sage Todz =

Welsh rapper

- Born: Eretoda Ogunbanwo; Essex, England
- Origin: Penygroes, Gwynedd, Wales
- Genres: UK drill; British hip hop; Welsh hip hop
- Years active: 2020–present

Eretoda Ogunbanwo, known professionally as Sage Todz, is a Welsh rapper producing both Welsh and English language music.

== Life ==
The family of Sage Todz (full name Eretoda Ogunbanwo) moved to Penygroes, Gwynedd from Essex in 2007. Sage Todz and his Nigerian family have been subjected to racism while living in Nantlle Valley, Gwynedd including a home window being smashed soon after they moved to the village, their home being egged and a car being keyed (intentionally scratched). A notable racist incident against his family in Wales, which they had to report to the police, occurred in 2020, when a swastika was painted outside his mother's Penygroes home. A man was later arrested in connection with the hate crime. The local community responded by helping clean up the vandalism and in response to the incident, people across Wales and the UK have reached out to help his mother's business with it described as "booming". In February 2022, he released an EP titled "Sage Mode" based on his experiences of racism in the Gwynedd valley and being part of the only black family in the village.

Sage studied sport at Brunel University London. He started composing a style of trap music known as drill, which uses fast drum beats to create energetic music. The type is originally from Chicago in the United States and crime, violence and the darkness of the reality of life is one of the genre's major themes.

His Welsh identity is important to him. He said "It's a bit of who I am," as he has "lived there [in Wales] for over 15 years and I speak the language."

== Rownd a Rownd ==
Sage released an online video of him 'drilling' his new rap 'Rownd a Rownd' (Round and Round in English) in March 2022. Most of the song is in Welsh, and by April 2022 the video had been viewed over 200,000 times on Twitter. Due to its popularity the full version with music video was released on the S4C Group YouTube channel.

He said that more Welsh language music is needed in genres that do not currently have a lot of Welsh content. It would help to promote the language to young people.
