= Dafydd Iwan =

Welsh singer and politician (born 1943)

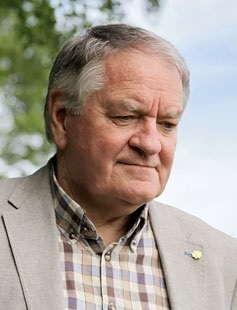
- Born: Dafydd Iwan Jones; 24 August 1943 (age 83); Brynamman, Carmarthenshire, Wales
- Occupations: Politician; folk singer
- Years active: 1960s–2025
- Known for: President of Plaid Cymru
- Notable work: "Yma o Hyd" (1983)
- Relatives: Huw Ceredig (brother); Alun Ffred Jones (brother)

Dafydd Iwan singing Ar Lan y Môr (1993)

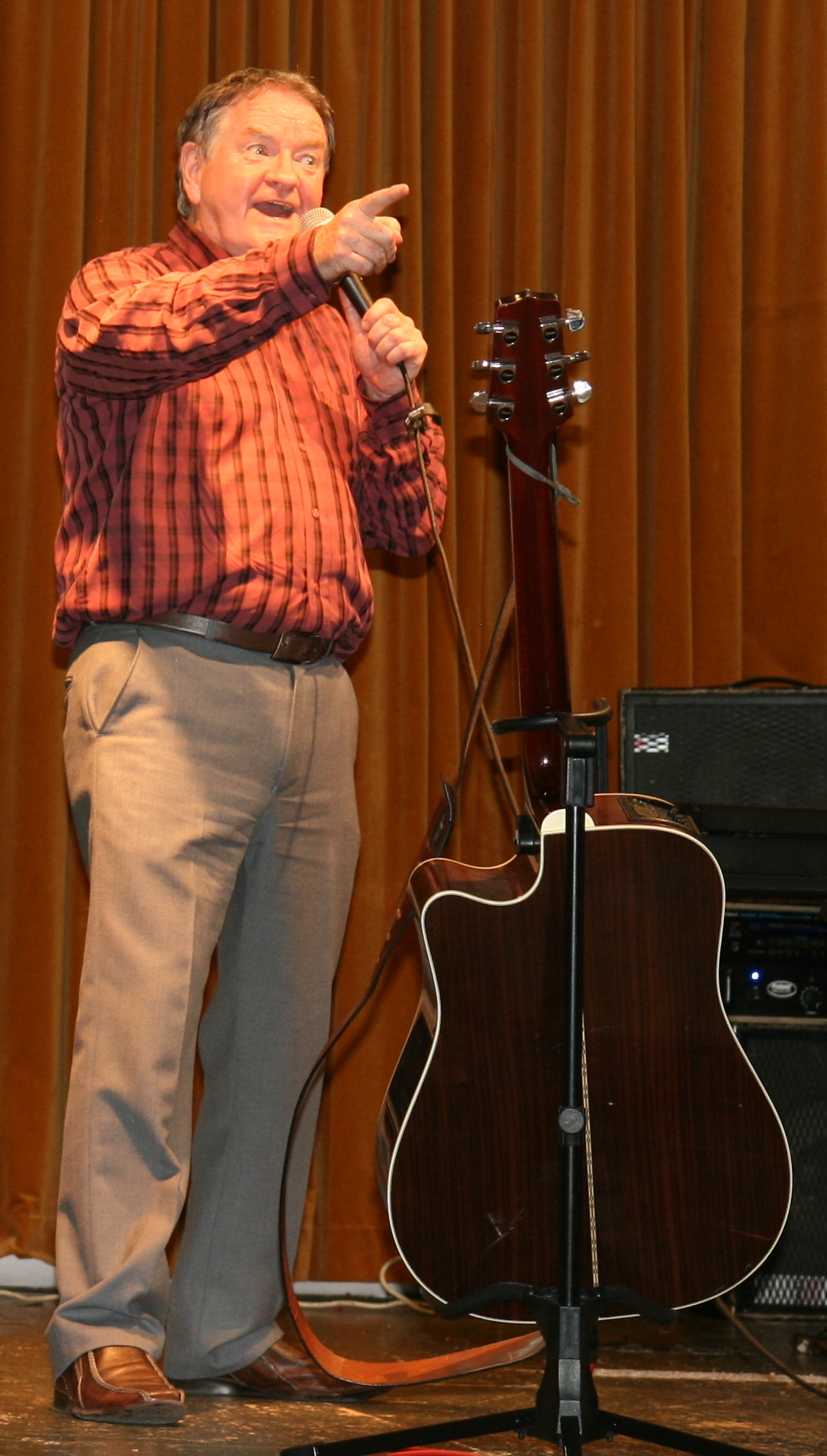

Dafydd Iwan Jones (born 24 August 1943) is a Welsh singer and nationalist politician who rose to fame writing and performing folk music in the Welsh language. From 2003 to 2010, Iwan was the president of Plaid Cymru, a political party which advocates for Welsh independence from the UK.

== Early life ==
Dafydd Iwan Jones was born in Brynamman, Carmarthenshire. One of four boys, his siblings include the actor Huw Ceredig and the politician Alun Ffred Jones. His paternal grandfather, Fred Jones, was a member of the Bardic family Teulu'r Cilie, and a founding member of Plaid Cymru. He spent most of his youth in Bala in Gwynedd before attending the University of Wales, Cardiff, where he studied architecture.

== Musical career ==
Iwan's earliest material was Welsh translations of songs by American folk/protest singers (Woody Guthrie, Pete Seeger, and Bob Dylan) until he began to write his first ballads. The most prominent of these were political, including the satirical song, "Carlo" ("Charles"). This was written for the investiture of the Prince of Wales in 1969. Iwan has also written love ballads and variations on traditional Welsh folk tunes.

By the late 1960s, he was receiving television coverage both for his music and for his political activities as a member of Cymdeithas yr Iaith. He was imprisoned in 1970 for his refusal to pay fines for defacing English-language road signs as part of the fight for Welsh-language rights, serving three weeks of a three-month sentence. This event was commemorated in his song "Pam fod eira'n wyn?" ("Why is snow white?"). His song "Peintio'r byd yn wyrdd" ("Painting the World Green") was regarded as a "battle hymn" of the road signs campaign.

During the 1970s, his political interests (and songs) took in such themes as Pinochet's Chile, Welsh devolution, the Vietnam War and the Northern Ireland troubles. Later songs mention events such as the Tiananmen Square massacre (1989), the Gulf War (1990) and opencast mining in the south Wales valleys (1995).

In 1982 and 1983, Iwan embarked on two tours (and accompanying records) with the folk group Ar Log.

Around the turn of the millennium, he signalled an end to regular performances, although he remained an occasional performer. In August 2025, on the day before his 82nd birthday, he performed his final gig at the Llanuwchllyn Festival in Gwynedd.

=== Yma o Hyd ===
"Yma o Hyd" ("Still Here") was released in 1982 to “raise the spirits, to remind people we still speak Welsh against all odds. To show we are still here". Since then, the song has become a patriotic Welsh anthem and subsequently an unofficial anthem for the Wales national football team 40 years after its original release.

In January 2020, the song reached number one in the UK iTunes chart, spurred on by purchases by supporters of Welsh independence group YesCymru. The campaign mirrored the success of the Wolfe Tones song "Come Out, Ye Black and Tans" earlier that month.

The song was also sung live twice in the Cardiff City Stadium by Iwan before Wales' second round of matches for the qualification of the 2022 World Cup in Qatar, which became the second World Cup for Wales after 1958. Gareth Bale, the Welsh captain also led the Welsh team singing along with Dafydd Iwan after the final match. The performance and Wales's qualification led to the song returning to number one in the UK iTunes chart.

== Public life ==
Using his architecture studies, in 1971 Iwan was one of the founders of Cymdeithas Tai Gwynedd (Gwynedd Housing Association) and was involved in other projects to provide homes for the local population in north-west Wales.

Dafydd Iwan was one of the founders of Recordiau Sain Cyf (Sain Records Ltd), one of the main Welsh music labels.

Formerly a Plaid Cymru councillor in Gwynedd, he lost his seat in the May 2008 local elections.

Iwan's long service to the Welsh language led to his being made an honorary member of the Gorsedd of Bards at the National Eisteddfod at Bangor in 1971.

Iwan escaped a driving ban (for speeding offences) in October 2003 on the basis that he needed to drive for his musical and political duties.

Iwan became President of Plaid Cymru in 2003.

As part of his campaign seeking re-election as President of Plaid Cymru, Iwan launched a campaign blog Dafydd 4 President in July 2008.

On 22 October 2011, Dafydd and his wife Bethan came to watch the Welsh derby, Wrexham A.F.C. vs Newport County A.F.C. Dafydd sang his hit song "Yma o Hyd" in front of a crowd of 4,000 before the teams came out. He was invited to sing by the new Wrexham FC Supporters Group, who chose their name "Yma o Hyd" after his song.

In July 2023, Iwan was awarded an honorary degree from Bangor University, in Bangor, Gwynedd, for his "contribution to Welsh Culture, Language, Music and the Arts."

== Albums ==
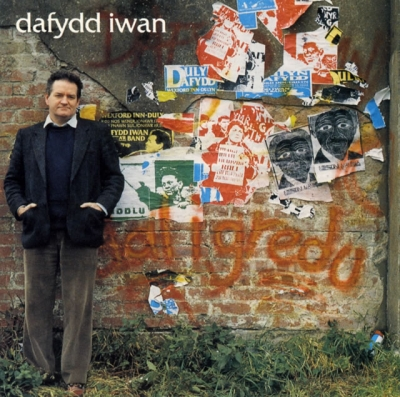
Album cover of Dal I Gredu (1991)

- Yma Mae 'Nghân (1972) (Here's My Song)
- Mae'r Darnau yn Disgyn i'w Lle (1976) (The Pieces Fall into Place)
- Carlo a Chaneuon Eraill (1977) (Carlo and Other Songs)
- 20 o Ganeuon Gorau (20 best songs)
- I'r Gad (1977) (To The War)
- Bod yn Rhydd (1979) (Being Free)
- Ar Dan (Live) (1981)
- Rhwng Hwyl a Thaith (with Ar Log) (1982) (Between Fun and Tour)
- Yma o Hyd (With Ar Log) (1983) (Still Here)
- Gwinllan a Roddwyd (1986) (Donated Vineyard)
- Dal I Gredu (1991) (Still Believe)
- Caneuon Gwerin (1994) (Folk Songs)
- Cân Celt (1995) (Celt Song)
- Y Caneuon Cynnar (1998) (Early Songs)
- Yn Fyw Cyfrol 1 (2001) (Live Volume 1)
- Yn Fyw Cyfrol 2 (2002) (Live Volume 2)
- Goreuon Dafydd Iwan (2006) (Best of Dafydd Iwan)
- Man Gwyn (White Space) (song about the early Welsh emigration to Patagonia and North America) (2007)
- Dos I ganu (2009) (Go To Sing)
- Cana Dy Gân (2012) (Sing Your Song) (complete 212 song collection)
- Emynau (2015) (Hymns)
- Ugain O'r Galon (2018) (Twenty From the Heart)

Party political offices
Preceded by Ieuan Wyn Jones	Chair of Plaid Cymru; 1982–1984	Succeeded by Syd Morgan
Preceded by Phil Williams	Vice President of Plaid Cymru; 1984–2003	Succeeded by Jill Evans
Preceded by Ieuan Wyn Jones	President of Plaid Cymru; 2003–2010	Succeeded by Jill Evans
