= Sain (record label) =

Recording company in North Wales (est. 1969)

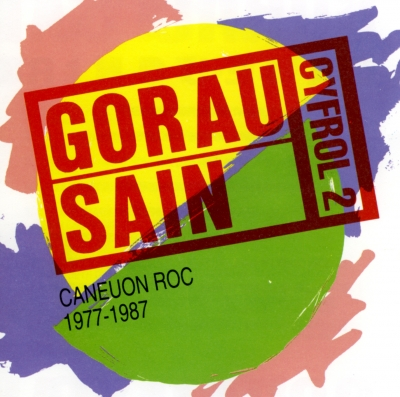
Album cover of Gorau Sain Cyfrol 2 (1987)

Extract from Dŵr by Huw Jones (1969), Sain's first release

Sain (Welsh for Audio, Welsh pronunciation: [saɪn]), in full – Sain (Recordiau) Cyf. (Audio (Records) Ltd) is a Welsh record label, which took part in the Welsh folk revival.

== History ==
Sain was founded in Cardiff in 1969 by singers and songwriters Dafydd Iwan and Huw Jones and businessman Brian Morgan Edwards, as a home for Welsh-language rock and folk music, which was otherwise finding it difficult to 'break through' in the UK market. Sain is regarded as being the first Welsh record company to be self-sufficient in terms of independence from other British companies, and laid the foundation for subsequent Welsh labels.

The company released its first single in October 1969, Huw Jones' "Dŵr" (Welsh for Water), a song about the drowning of the Tryweryn Valley, in the north of Wales, to form Llyn Celyn reservoir. Many of the company's early releases were recorded at the Rockfield Studios in Monmouthshire. In the early 1970s Sain moved to the Caernarfon area, and opened their first recording studio in 1975 near Llandwrog. Musicians who have recorded for the label include Meic Stevens, Geraint Jarman and Bryn Terfel.

== Current activities ==
Today Sain remains the biggest producer of music of Wales, covering traditional, folk, rock, pop, hip-hop, rap, country and classical music.

The label has several subsidiaries including Crai, which was founded in 1988 and has released music by Yr Anhrefn, Mike Peters and Big Leaves, as well as a series of Crai Tecno compilations featuring Welsh dance music artists.

Rasal Cyf. is the latest label, and this signs young Welsh bands.

Maartin Allcock has produced many Sain albums. The label's Chief Executive is Dafydd Roberts, the harp and flute player of the folk band Ar Log.

In 2017 Sain released over 7,000 audio clips and 498 album covers under a Creative Commons licence. These are available on Wikimedia Commons.

== Branch labels ==
- Sain – main label
- Crai – mainstream rock label
- Rasal – pop/indie label for young talents
- Slic – library music label
- Tryfan – dormant label

== See also ==
- List of record labels
