= Dic Penderyn =

Welshman involved in 1831 Merthyr Rising

Richard Lewis (1807/8 – 13 August 1831), known as Dic Penderyn, was a Welsh labourer and coal miner who lived in Merthyr Tydfil and was involved with the Merthyr Rising of 3 June 1831. In the course of the riot he was arrested alongside Lewis Lewis, one of the primary figures in the uprising, and charged with stabbing a soldier with a bayonet. The people of Merthyr Tydfil doubted his guilt, and signed a petition for his release. However, he was found guilty and hanged on 13 August 1831. After his death he was treated as a martyr in Merthyr and across Wales.

== Early life ==
Richard Lewis was born in Aberavon, Glamorgan, Wales in 1807 or 1808, in a cottage named Penderyn. He was the son of Lewis Lewis, a cordwainer and later a miner from Cornelly, and his wife, Margaret. He moved to Merthyr Tydfil with his family in 1819, where he and his father found work in the mines. He was literate with some chapel schooling. His family were Methodists, and his sister Elizabeth married the Methodist preacher Morgan Howells.

== Trial ==
Along with Lewis Lewis (known as Lewsyn yr Heliwr), Dic Penderyn was arrested for stabbing Private Donald Black of the 93rd (Sutherland Highlanders) Regiment of Foot, using a bayonet attached to a gun. This incident was alleged to have happened outside the Castle Inn. Private Black's injuries were not fatal, and he could not identify either Lewis Lewis or Richard Lewis; nevertheless, at the conclusion of the day-long trial on 13 July 1831 by Mr Justice Bosanquet and a jury at Cardiff Assizes, both were convicted and sentenced to death. There is no evidence that Dic played any substantial part in the rising at all unlike Lewis who was definitely involved. Both were held in Cardiff gaol.

Lewis Lewis had his sentence commuted to transportation, largely thanks to the testimony of a Special Constable, John Thomas, whom Lewis had shielded from the rioters. The people of Merthyr Tydfil were convinced that Dic Penderyn was not responsible for the stabbing, and more than 11,000 signed a petition demanding his release; even the conservative Cambrian newspaper objected. Joseph Tregelles Price, a Quaker ironmaster from Neath, who went to console the two condemned men, was immediately convinced of Dic Penderyn's innocence and went to Merthyr to gather evidence for this. He persuaded the trial judge that the sentence was unsafe. The Home Secretary Lord Melbourne, well known for his severity, delayed the execution for two weeks, but refused to reduce the sentence despite pleas not only from workers but the Welsh establishment. It seems the execution occurred solely because Lord Melbourne wanted at least one rebel to die as an example.

== Death ==
Dic Penderyn was hanged outside Cardiff gaol on the gallows in St. Mary's Street, Cardiff (at what is now the entrance of Cardiff Market), at 8am on 13 August 1831 at the age of 23. His last words were "O Arglwydd, dyma gamwedd" (English: "Oh Lord, here is iniquity"). Penderyn's public execution allegedly caused his pregnant wife to suffer a miscarriage.

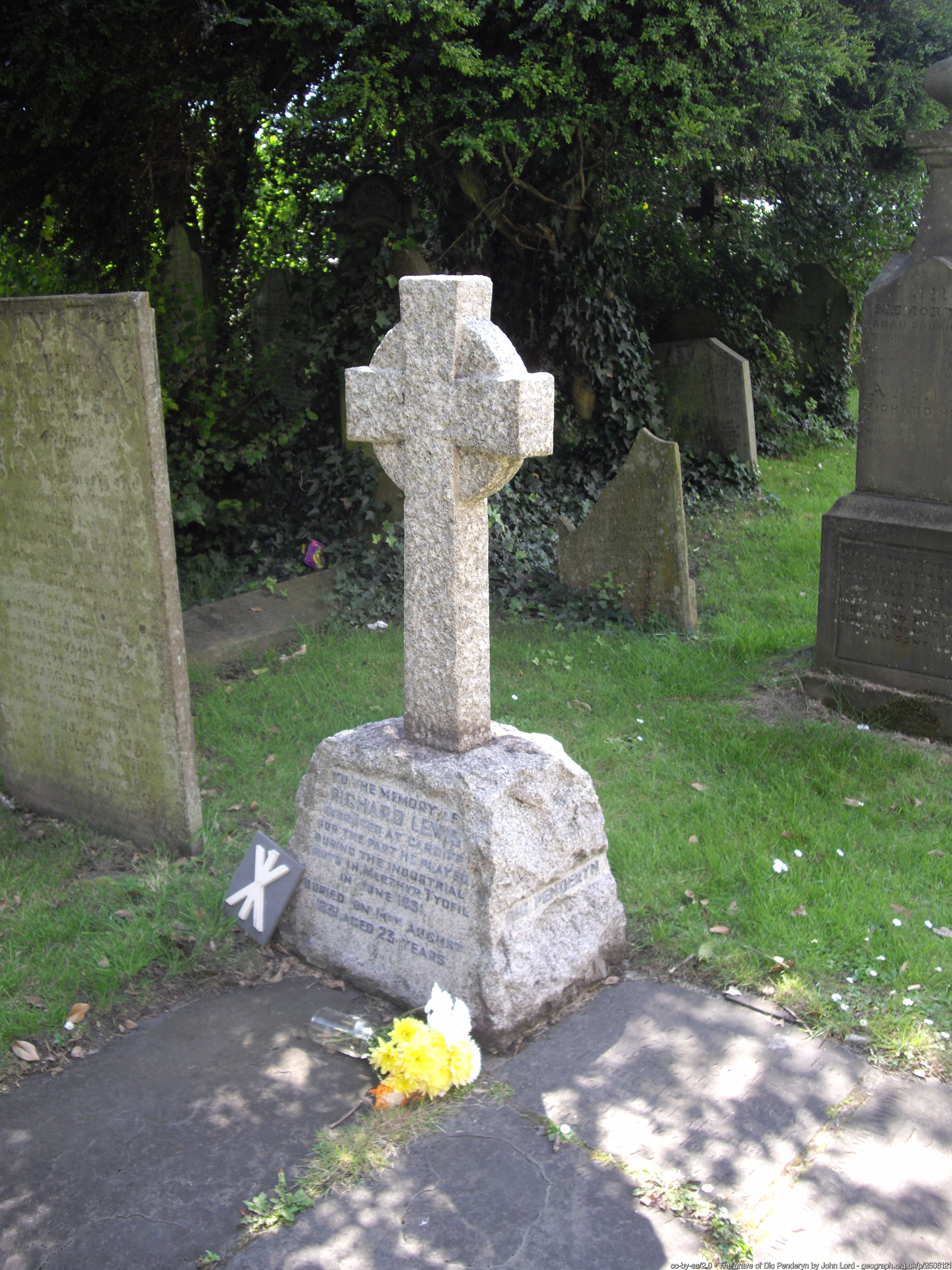
Memorial in St Mary's churchyard, Aberavon, erected by local trade unionists in 1966

Thousands accompanied his body through the Vale of Glamorgan to his grave (various parishes en route refusing to accept the responsibility of interment), and listened to a funeral sermon from his brother-in-law Morgan Howells. He was buried in St Mary's churchyard in Aberavon, Port Talbot, where a memorial was placed by local trade unionists in 1966. There is a plaque to Dic Penderyn at Cardiff Market, near to the gallows site. Regarded as a martyr, his death further embittered relations between Welsh workers and the authorities and strengthened the Trade Union movement and Chartism in the run up to the Newport Rising.

The Merthyr Rising is claimed to be the first time the red flag was used as a banner of workers power, and the outrage surrounding Dic Penderyn's death gave it great potency.

== Aftermath ==
In 1874, a man named Ianto Parker confessed on his death bed, in the United States, to Evan Evans that he stabbed Black and then fled to America fearing capture by the authorities, thus exonerating Dic Penderyn. Another man named James Abbott, who testified against Dic Penderyn at the trial, also later admitted to lying under oath.

Interest in the case has remained strong. Harri Webb wrote a booklet on it in 1956 titled Dic Penderyn and the Merthyr Uprising of 1831. In 1972 Alexander Cordell wrote the popular novel The Fire People, set against the background of the Merthyr Rising. Cordell did considerable research and an appendix to the book presents evidence suggesting he may have been unjustly condemned to be hanged. The book added to the interest in the case. In 1977 a memorial to a "Martyr of the Welsh Working Class" was unveiled at Merthyr public library by Len Murray, the General Secretary of the TUC, and sections from Cordell's book were read out.

== Campaign for a pardon ==
In 2000 a legal case was started by Lewis's descendants to seek a pardon. In June 2015, Ann Clwyd MP presented a petition for a pardon in the House of Commons. Mike Penning, Minister for Policing, Crime and Criminal Justice, responded that pardons were only granted "where evidence has come to light which demonstrates conclusively that the convicted individual was innocent and that the relevant appeal mechanisms have been exhausted". In July 2016, Stephen Kinnock MP presented a 600-signature petition to the Ministry of Justice, calling for a pardon. The Ministry of Justice replied that 10,000 signatures were required to trigger a parliamentary debate, and referred to the answer given by the ministry in 2015. Kinnock said that the fight for a pardon would continue.

== Bibliography ==
Dic Penderyn by Meic Stevens (1972, opening)

Dic Penderyn by Carreg Lafar (2002, opening)

=== Biography ===
- ap Nicholas, Islwyn (1945). Dic Penderyn, Welsh Rebel and Martyr. London: Foyle's Welsh Press. OCLC 556511226.
- Williams, Gwyn A. (1978). "Dic Penderyn: The Making of a Welsh Working Class Martyr". Llafur: The Journal of the Society for the Study of Welsh Labour History. 2 (3): 110–122. ISSN 0306-0837.
- Roberts Jones, Sally (1993). Dic Penderyn : the man and the martyr. Port Talbot: Goldleaf. ISBN 9780907117643.

=== Novels ===
- Cordell, Alexander (1972). The Fire People. Hodder & Stoughton. ISBN 9780340155769.
- Williams, Rhydwen (1975). The Angry Vineyard. Swansea: C. Davies. ISBN 978-0715401149.
- Thomas, Gwyn (1986). All Things Betray Thee. London: Lawrence & Wishart. ISBN 0-85315-664-6.

=== Plays ===
- Only A Matter of Time and Time Added on For Injuries – Alan Plater (linked radio plays for the BBC, 2000)
- My Land's Shore – Christopher J Orton and Robert Gould (musical, 2017)
- Iniquity (Camwedd) – Stuart Broad (2021)

=== Poetry ===
- Williams, John Stuart (1970). Dic Penderyn, and other poems. Llandysul: Gwasg Gomer. ISBN 978-0850880762.

=== Music ===
- Dic Penderyn – Meic Stevens (on the 1972 album Gwymon and the compilation album Disgwyl Rhywbeth Gwell i Ddod)
- Dic Penderyn – The Chartists (on 1987 album Cause for Complaint)
- Dic Penderyn (The Ballad of Richard Lewis) – Martyn Joseph (on the 1997 album Full Colour Black And White)
- Dic Penderyn – Carreg Lafar (on the 2002 album Profiad)
