= Five Roads =

Village in Carmarthenshire, Wales

Coordinates: 51°44′N 4°11′W

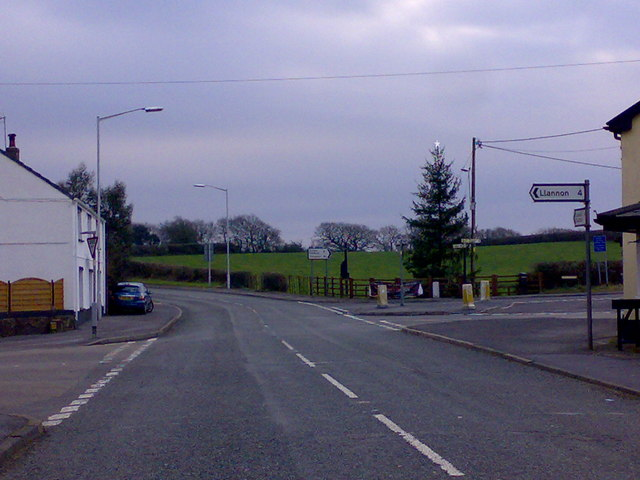
Five Roads

Five Roads (Welsh: Pum Heol or Pump-hewl) is a village on the B4309 road in Carmarthenshire, Wales, 5 miles (8.0 km) from Llanelli and 10 miles (16 km) from Carmarthen.

The name comes from the fact that there are five roads leading off Y Sgwar (Welsh for 'the square'); the central part of the village on the main road. The five roads are: Rehoboth Road, Horeb Road, Heol Hen, and the entrance and exit of the main road, known as Ynys-y-Cwm Road on the Llanelli side and Eclipse Terrace on the Carmarthen side.

There are two pubs, The Stag, situated centrally on the main road, and the Waun Wyllt 1/4-mile (0.40 km) distant in the neighbouring hamlet of Horeb, which abuts Five Roads. The Stag pub is famous as the meeting place of the Rebecca Rioters who gathered there to plan raids in the 18th century. Prior to its refurbishment in 2007 the pub operated a two-bar system with the names of the bar and lounge, reflecting its Rebecca Riots history, named the Dai'r Cantwr Bar and Shoni Sguborfawr Lounge after two of the ringleaders.

A blue plaque was unveiled at the pub in 2008 as part of anniversary celebrations. Two other blue plaques are installed on the former inns at Farmers Arms Cottage and Ty Newydd, formerly the Plough and Harrow.

Five Roads has been associated with several notable sportspeople. Former Wales rugby union international Scott Quinnell, former Wales football international Emyr Huws, former Scarlets rugby union player Steffan Hughes, and former Scarlets and Wales international rugby union player Steff Evans all attended Ysgol Gynradd Pum Heol (Five Roads Primary School).
