= Scotch Cattle =

19th century secret society in Wales

Scotch Cattle was the name taken by bands of coal miners in 19th century South Wales, analogous to the Molly Maguires in Pennsylvania, who, in disguise, would visit the homes of other local miners who were working during a strike or cooperating with employers against the local mining community in other ways and punish them by ransacking their property or attacking them physically.

They were featured in Alexander Cordell's book, set in this era, Rape of the Fair Country against a backdrop of the Newport Rising of 1839, Chartism and militancy in the South Wales Valleys of the mid 19th century. Some members of these bands were probably idealists, but some also were merely looking for a chance to loot property from the groups' targets—or even, in some cases, from bystanders. Such groups may have been active as early as 1808, although their activity cannot be confirmed before 1822; the last confirmable reference to a Scotch Cattle raid dates from 1850. As late as 1926, however, pickets in that year's great strike dressed themselves as Scotch Cattle.

== Name ==
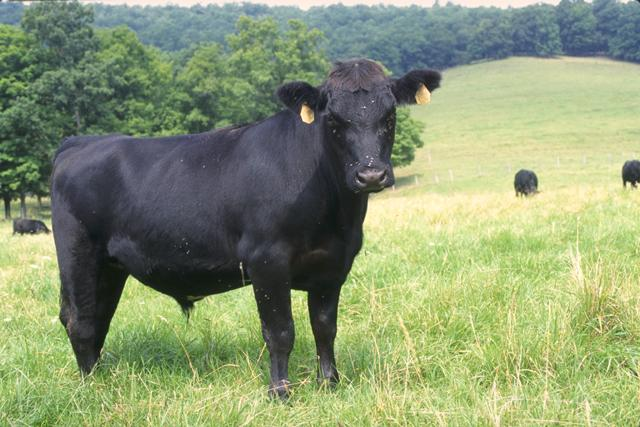
The name of the Scotch Cattle may have been inspired by the huge size, strength and toughness of certain Scottish breeds.

The origins of the groups' name have been lost, but several possible interpretations have been offered. Some of the disguises worn by Scotch Cattle were actual cowskins, and this alone may have provided the name. Alternatively, it may have been meant to evoke the fierceness of certain breeds of actual Scottish cattle, such as Highland cattle, or may have referred ironically to a herd of Scottish cattle owned by a local mine-owner in the early 19th century. Their name may also have been a pun on 'scotch' as a verb meaning 'to stop', or may have referenced the stationing on the coalfield during the strike of 1822 of a troop of soldiers known as the Scotch Greys.

== Methods ==
The central aim of the Cattle was to enforce solidarity among the mining community. Men who worked during a strike might be warned by a posted notice that they were at risk of an attack; if the target did not comply, a "Herd" would visit his house in the night. Composed of as many as 300 men and led by a "Bull", the Herd would in most cases have been called in from a neighbouring town, to eliminate the possibility that the target might identify and report one of its members. The members of the Herd would all wear disguises, although these varied widely in quality, ranging from elaborate cowhide costumes on the one hand to women's clothing and simple reversed jackets on the other - the latter echoing the costumes used in other Welsh protests such as the Rebecca Riots.

After announcing their presence by blowing on horns and rattling chains, the Herd members would smash the house's doors, windows, and furniture and burn fabric items in a bonfire. If the homeowner resisted, he would be beaten severely. Firearms were used on occasion, but usually without serious effect; in one incident in 1834, however, a miner's wife was killed by a visiting Herd, a crime for which one man, Edward Morgan, was later executed and two imprisoned. Herds also on occasion looted truck shops, which were always a target of miners' ire for their allegedly unfair price levels and monopoly on local business. Less idealistically, the Herd might also raid and attack the homes of uninvolved families that happened to be located near the target home or business—and even some official raids were probably motivated more by the desire to plunder the target's house than the need to enforce solidarity.

A more recent historian has argued that the activities of the Scotch Cattle represent an application of pre-industrial methods of rural community discipline or charivari to an untried industrial context, where such techniques eventually proved unsustainable.

== See also ==
- Blackleg
- "Blackleg Miner" (song)
- Secret society
