= Rape of the Fair Country =

1959 novel by Alexander Cordell

- First US edition
- Author: Alexander Cordell
- Language: English
- Publisher: Gollancz (UK); Doubleday (US)
- Publication date: Jan 1959
- Publication place: United Kingdom
- Media type: Print (Hardback & Paperback)
- ISBN: 1-872730-15-9
- Followed by: The Hosts Of Rebecca

Rape of the Fair Country is a novel by Alexander Cordell, first published in 1959. It is the first in Cordell's "Mortymer Trilogy", followed by The Hosts Of Rebecca (1960) and Song of the Earth (1969). The book has been translated into seventeen languages. In addition to the book having been adapted for numerous plays over the years and more recently.

There also exist audio versions of the book in circulation read by Philip Madoc and there have been successive attempts to get the book made into a film.

Cordell's style and subject matter are reminiscent of Richard Llewellyn's How Green Was My Valley.

== Plot summary ==
The plot concerns the Welsh iron-making communities of Blaenavon and Nantyglo in the 19th century. The action is seen through the eyes of young Iestyn Mortymer who grows up in times of growing tensions between ironmasters and trade unionists. In 1826, when the book starts, Iestyn is eight years old and already beginning work at the Garndyrus furnaces near Blaenavon. His sister Morfydd has strong feelings about women and children working in mines and ironworks. She sympathises with the Chartist movement and condemns the action of the militant Scotch Cattle groups. In this she is in opposition to Hywel Mortymer, their conservative father who later begins to question his own loyalty to the ironmaster.

== Story ==
Cordell's first successful novel draws the hardship of life in early industrial Wales with the father starting off as positive towards the English coal and iron masters of the time but then on seeing his family and neighbours suffer (and sometimes die) he revolts with his son, Iestyn to protest. The family life leads to the fight for trade unions and Chartism. The historical background against which the novel is set is described in considerable detail with profoundly researched factual events like the 1839 Newport Rising show this book to be worthy of the bestseller status it achieved in the UK as well as the USA. Cordell told of the story of the Chartist movement starting in Wales accurately and clearly like no other, but with a background of humanity of the Mortymer family.
