= The Fire People =

1972 novel by Alexander Cordell

- First edition
- Author: Alexander Cordell
- Language: English
- Publisher: Hodder & Stoughton
- Publication date: 1972
- Publication place: United Kingdom
- Media type: Print (hardback & paperback)
- ISBN: 0-340-17403-X
- Followed by: This Sweet and Bitter Earth

The Fire People is a historical novel by Alexander Cordell, first published in 1972. It forms part of the 'Second Welsh Trilogy' of Cordell's writings. It tells of events leading up to the 1831 Merthyr Rising in Merthyr Tydfil and surrounding areas in South Wales.

Cordell's style and subject matter have been described as being reminiscent of Richard Llewellyn's How Green Was My Valley, but also owe something to the style of Dylan Thomas.

== Plot summary ==
In 1830. Merthyr Tydfil is the largest town in Wales; an industrial centre and one of the Top Towns, with four major iron works. People from all parts of the world flock to find work there; from Spain and Italy, from England, and from Ireland. Men and Women work alongside each other, doing equally heavy and dangerous jobs, frequently dying at the workplace.

Gideon Davies is a former worker at Taibach copper works and a trained musician. After losing nearly all his sight in an accident at the works, he is now an itinerant musician, playing his fiddle at taverns, wakes and social gatherings throughout South Wales. He also uses his travels to promote the concept of unions and worker's rights.

Various other characters are also travelling to Merthyr, attracted by the coal and iron industries. They include the genteel Miss Thrush the Sweets who has sold her shop in Pontypridd, and is secretly enamoured of Gideon, even though she only sees him about once a year. Annie Hewers and Megsie Lloyd are lusty young girls out for adventure, Many Irish navvies have also arrived, including Big Bonce, Belcher and Lady Godiva.

Travelling through Maesteg towards Pontypridd, Gideon comes upon Sun Heron, a fiery young two-fisted Irish girl who attempts to steals his meagre food, claiming to be starving. She later latches onto Gideon as he travels the roads, and will not be sent away.

Gideon and Sun are ambushed by the 'Cefn Riders', semi-feral itinerant labourers and highwaymen, but are rescued by Dic Lewis, known as Dic Penderyn. Together they travel to Merthyr where Sun lodges with Dic's Parents in 'China', a semi-slum riverside area of town.

Dic works at the blast furnaces of Ynysfach iron works. He starts going with Sun, who has decided she wants to marry him, but Dic is cautious, preferring the freedom to chase various girls, including the molls who gather at the Iron Bridge.

Dic attends a benefit club meeting with Zimmerman, a firebrand Polish agitator, and Gideon, which discusses union matters, matters which must be kept secret from the ironmasters who effectively rule Merthyr. The meeting is addressed by Gideon and also by Morfydd Mortymer, an eloquent (and comely) speaker from Blaenavon. He meets Lewis Lewis, known as Lewsyn yr Heliwr. They discuss the abuses of the hated Court of Requests, known as 'Coffin's Court' after Joseph Coffin who operates it. The court can, and frequently does, seize goods in lieu of unpaid rent or debt, and auction off the goods after a month.

Dic and Sun marry and move into a cottage near the works. Winter comes and the iron trade contracts; the owners reduce wages and many people starve or freeze to death. Dic initially still earns good money whilst Sun cleans and cooks for Gideon.

Dic and his friends attend chapel, where his brother-in-law Rev Morgan Howells rails against the unions. Gideon stands to argue against the minister and others support him. The would-be unionists stand and leave the chapel. Within a few days, Dic and his friends lose their jobs.

As 1831 dawns, Sun gives birth to a boy, Richard Jay, after a difficult pregnancy. Their furniture is seized for debt by Coffin's court.

Gideon and Zimmerman address a mass meeting after the annual Waun fair near Dowlais Top. Gideon argues for restraint and parliamentary reform as the way forward, but Zimmerman urges violence as their only option. The men are angry and determine to tear down Coffin's Court. They march to the Court and reclaim confiscated furniture. They destroy the records of the seizures and burn the building.

The men are joined by others from outlying districts; even Dr William Price arrives in his goat cart, decked out in his druidic robes. The men march on the town. The ironmasters, Guest and Crawshay, and magistrate Bruce, are barricaded in the Castle Inn by newly arrived soldiers. Zimmerman has vanished and is never seen again. Dic, at Sun's pleading and the urging of Morgan Howells, goes up onto Aberdare mountain to be safe from the violence, although he feels a strong loyalty to his mates.

Matters get out of hand, after a deputation led by Gideon and Lewis Lewis meets the owners, with no result. The Riot Act is read in English and Welsh. Soldiers start shooting and open fighting occurs. 22 of the rioters are killed and many are wounded. Gideon is one of the first to fall, but he is rescued by Miss Thrush, who hides him from special constables who are searching from house to house. After several unsuccessful attempts at parley with the ironmasters, and the arrival of more soldiers, most of the men and women, who have been marching under a Red Flag, lose heart and start to disperse. Lewis Lewis is arrested. Special constables hold Sun captive in her house until Dic arrives back from Aberdare mountain. He is taken, despite a fierce fight, and charged with stabbing a soldier, Private Donald Black.

Lewis and Dic are tried and condemned to death, although the sentence of the former is later commuted to transportation to Australia. (The trials are not described in the novel, but discussed through the mouths of other characters and mentioned in the appendix to the novel).

Gideon searches for evidence that Dic was not the man who stabbed Black, but in vain. On the day that Dic is to be hanged in Cardiff, large crowds come to witness the execution, most believing him to be innocent. Dic is comforted in prison by Howells, Rev Evan Evans, the prison chaplain and Joseph Tregelles Price, a Quaker ironmaster who is convinced of his innocence and has prepared many petitions to the Government on Dic's behalf. Dic swears that he is innocent of stabbing Black. He states that he was in fact present at the meeting with the owners at the Castle Inn, but left by the back door, not the front as was alleged, and did not attack Black.

As he is about to be hanged, he declares; "O Arglwydd, dyma gamwedd" ("Oh Lord, here is iniquity") Crowds carry his body to its final resting place near Port Talbot.

Gideon has partially recovered his sight, as a result of a musket blow. He resumes his itinerant lifestyle, to the disappointment of Miss Thrush who still secretly loves him. Sun, who has been evicted from her cottage, is taken into the care of Morgan Howells.

The book concludes with an appendix of documents, some not previously known to exist, discovered by the author whilst researching the book. They strongly suggest that Dic did not stab Private Black, who was unable to identify him.

In 1874, Ianto Parker confesses on his death bed, in the United States, to the Reverend Evan Evans that he stabbed Black and then fled to America fearing capture by the authorities. This has been seen as exonerating Dic from any guilt.

James Abbott, who testified against Penderyn at the trial, also later admitted to lying under oath. The novel earlier describes Abbot, a barber, insulting Sun and thus getting into a brawl with Dic, for which Abbott vows revenge.

== Quotations ==
....But near the scarlet uniforms of the Redcoats on guard against disturbances he saw one face upturned, and it was that of Mistress Morfydd Mortymer......And he remembered her face with its glowing dark eyes and the way she held herself. Suddenly she clenched her hand and swept back her hair, and as the Hangman placed the noose about him, she cried, her voice shrill: Die hard, Dic Penderyn. You are dying for Wales. Die hard, Dic Penderyn!
