= Carmarthen Guildhall =

Municipal building in Carmarthen, Wales

- Neuadd y Dref Caerfyrddin (Welsh)
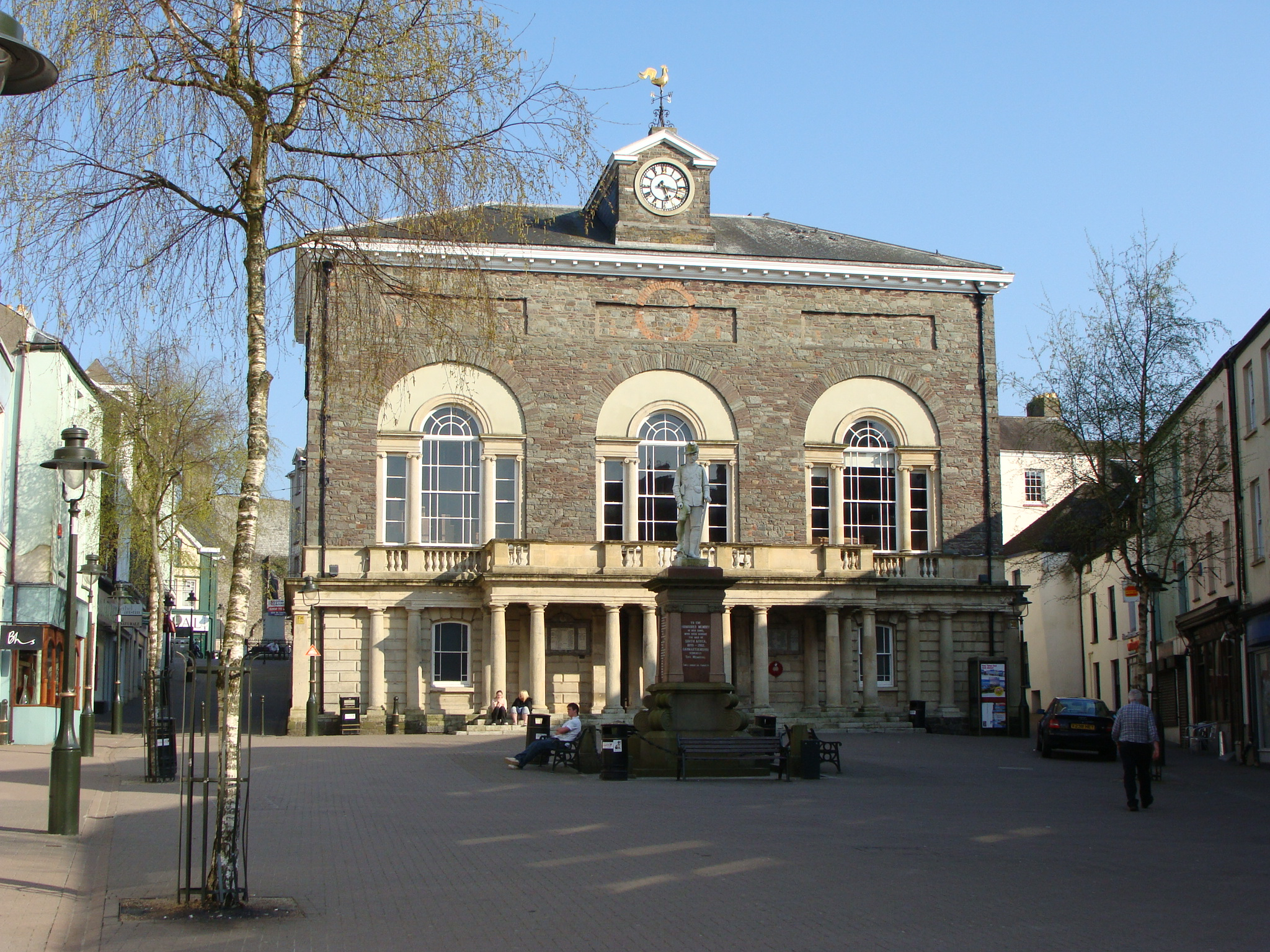
- Carmarthen Guildhall

- Shown in Carmarthenshire
- 51.8561°N 4.3071°W
- Location: Guildhall Square, Carmarthen

History
- Built: 1777

Site notes
- Architect: Sir Robert Taylor
- Architectural style: Neoclassical style

Listed Building – Grade I
- Official name: The Guildhall
- Designated: 18 August 1954
- Reference no.: 9450

Carmarthen Guildhall (Welsh: Neuadd y Dref Caerfyrddin) is a municipal structure in Guildhall Square, Carmarthen, Wales. The guildhall, which was the headquarters of Carmarthen Borough Council, is a Grade I listed building.

== History ==
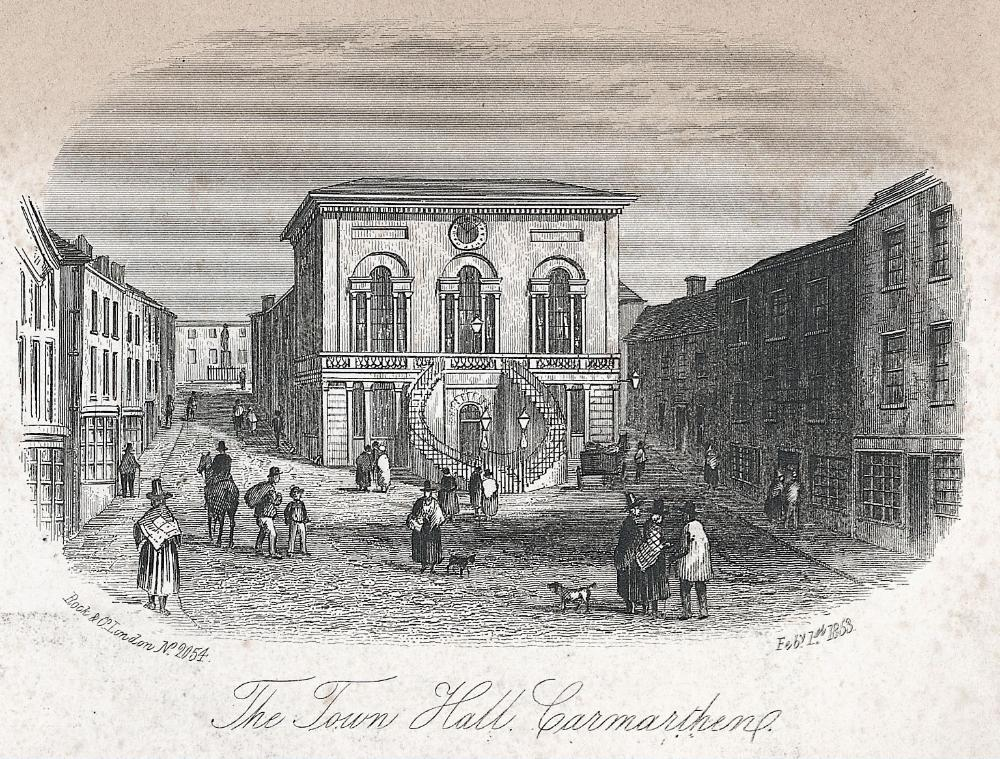
A view of the guildhall in 1853

The building was commissioned to replace a 16th-century guildhall which, by 1765, had become very dilapidated and had to be demolished in 1766. Some £4,000 towards the cost of the new building was donated by the future local Member of Parliament, John Adams. The foundation stone for the new building was laid on 10 April 1767: it was designed by Sir Robert Taylor in the neoclassical style, built in rubble masonry and completed in 1777.

The design involved a symmetrical main frontage with three bays facing onto Guildhall Square; it was originally arcaded on the ground floor, so that markets could be held, with assembly rooms on the first floor. The ground floor was rusticated with Tuscan order columns supporting an entablature and a balustrade, while the first floor featured three large arched recesses containing Venetian windows surmounted by stone voussoirs with blind panels above.

A double curving flight of steps to the assembly hall was added in 1811, an extension to the rear incorporating jury rooms and offices was completed in 1829 and a large portico, replacing the flight of steps, was added to a design by W. H. Lindsey in 1862. A projecting clock turret and a weather vane in the shape of a cockerel were also added in 1862. Internally, the principal rooms were the courtroom and the grand jury room on the first floor and the office of the magistrates' clerk on the ground floor.

Following his decision to vote against the First Reform Bill, the local Member of Parliament, John Jones, was attacked and injured in rioting at the guildhall on 29 April 1831 during a general election; polling in the constituency had to be postponed until August 1831 when Jones was successfully re-elected.

The Epiphany, Easter and Michaelmas quarter sessions were held in guildhall, while the Midsummer quarter sessions were held in the Shire Hall at Llandeilo. Several important trials took place in the guildhall. Two of the leaders of the Rebecca Riots, John Jones (Shoni Sguborfawr) and David Davies (Dai'r Cantwr), were convicted in the courtroom in December 1843 and sentenced to be transported to Australia. The trial of the solicitor, Harold Greenwood, for the murder of his wife, Mabel, took place at the guildhall in November 1920: Greenwood's defence barrister, Sir Edward Marshall Hall, was able to demonstrate that arsenic may not have been the cause of death after all and Harold Greenwood was acquitted.

A war memorial, designed by E. V. Collier and W. D. Jenkins and intended to commemorate the lives of service personnel who had died in the Second Boer War, was unveiled outside the guildhall by Major-General Henry Mackinnon on 27 April 1906.

The building was the main location for undertaking public business for the borough and remained as such until the borough officers and their departments moved to the municipal buildings in John Street in the first half of the 20th century. The guildhall was also the venue in July 1966 for the acceptance speech given by Gwynfor Evans, the first politician elected to represent Plaid Cymru at Westminster. After HM Courts and Tribunals Service decided to cease using the building as a courthouse, Carmarthenshire County Council took ownership of the building in summer 2016. Scenes from the television series, Keeping Faith, were filmed in the building in October 2017, and a programme of refurbishment works, which involved the conversion of the ground floor into a restaurant and cafe, was carried out at a cost of £1 million and completed in 2019.

Works of art in the guildhall include a portrait by Martin Archer Shee of General Sir Thomas Picton. Following revelations about Picton's links to slavery, Carmarthenshire County Council agreed to install an appropriate information plaque alongside the portrait. There are also portraits by Thomas Brigstocke of General Sir William Nott and of the local Members of Parliament, John Jones of Ystrad and David Morris.

== See also ==
- Grade II* listed buildings in Carmarthenshire
