= TWM =

Twm or TWM may refer to:

- TWM, the default window manager for the X Window System
- Tanu Weds Manu, a 2011 Hindi romantic comedy film
- Tawang language (ISO-639: twm), spoken in India
- Teradata Warehouse Miner, data mining software
- Third World Media, an American pornographic film studio
- Tiling window manager, a class of window managers
- Tyne and Wear Metro

== People ==
- Twm Carnabwth (1806–1876), Welsh rebel
- Twm Morys (born 1961), Welsh poet and musician
- Twm o'r Nant (1739–1810), Welsh-language dramatist and poet
- Twm Siôn Cati, a figure of Welsh folklore
