= Hosts of Rebecca =

- First edition (publ. Gollancz)
- Author: Alexander Cordell
- Language: English
- Publisher: Gollancz
- Publication date: 1960
- OCLC: 3940850
- LC Class: PZ4.C794 Ho

Hosts of Rebecca is a novel by Alexander Cordell, first published in 1960. It is the second in Cordell's "Mortymer Trilogy", followed by Song of the Earth.

Cordell's style and subject matter are reminiscent of Richard Llewellyn's How Green Was My Valley.

== Plot summary ==
The plot concerns the Rebecca Riots in the 19th century. The action is seen through the eyes of young Jethro Mortymer. It is based on the true events of the Rebecca Riots in which the people of West Wales protested against the toll gate charges of the business men and land owners of the time. The Rebecca name refers to the leader of the campaign, which was a man dressing in women's attire to protect his identity.
