= Sally Roberts Jones =

- Born: Sally Roberts; 30 November 1935 (age 90); London, England
- Education: Bangor University
- Occupations: Poet; publisher; critic

Sally Roberts Jones (born 30 November 1935) is an English-born Welsh poet, publisher and critic.

== Biography ==
She was born Sally Roberts in London; her father was Welsh. She studied history at University College Bangor, then qualified as a librarian before moving to South Wales in 1967. A founding member of the English Language Section of Yr Academi Gymreig, she was its Secretary / Treasurer from 1968 to 1975 and its chair from 1993 to 1997. She founded the Alun Books imprint and is on the editorial board of the poetry journal Roundyhouse.

In addition to her published work, she has run workshops and courses in schools and for adults, given readings in England, Ireland, Wales and Yugoslavia, and written verse plays and children's stories for radio.

She has also written and lectured on the cultural and industrial history of Wales and contributed to the Oxford Companion to the Literature of Wales, the Dictionary of Welsh Biography and the New Dictionary of National Biography. Two particular interests are the development of the Arthurian legend and research into the field of Welsh Writing in English, though she has also written about Essex, where she was initially raised.

In 2019 she was elected a Fellow of the Learned Society of Wales.

== Selected works ==
- Romford in the Nineteenth Century (1968)
- Turning Away (1969) (winner, Welsh Arts Council Prize)
- The Forgotten Country (1977)
- Elen and the Goblin, and other legends of Afan (1977)
- Strangers and Brothers (radio) (1977)
- Books of Welsh Interest: an annotated bibliography (1977)
- Allen Raine (Writers of Wales series) (1979)
- Relative Values (1985)
- The History of Port Talbot (1991)
- Pendarvis (1992)
- Dic Penderyn: the Man and the Martyr (1993)
- Notes for a Life: New and Selected Poems 1953-2005 (2010)
