= This Sweet and Bitter Earth =

1977 novel by Alexander Cordell

- First US edition
- Author: Alexander Cordell
- Language: English
- Publisher: Hodder & Stoughton (UK); St Martin's Press (US)
- Publication date: 1977
- Publication place: United Kingdom
- Media type: Print (hardback & paperback)
- ISBN: 0-330-37724-8
- Preceded by: The Fire People
- Followed by: Land of my Fathers (novel)

This Sweet and Bitter Earth is a historical novel by Alexander Cordell, first published in 1977. It forms part of the 'Second Welsh Trilogy' of Cordell's writings.

Cordell's style and subject matter have been described as being reminiscent of Richard Llewellyn's How Green Was My Valley, but also owe something to the style of Dylan Thomas.

== Plot summary ==
In 1900, a 16-year-old Toby Davies, the narrator of the story, leaves Wrexham workhouse after his Mother dies, and makes his way to the North Wales slate quarries. Failing to get a job at Port Dinorwic, the port from where the slate is sent all over the world, he makes his way to Blaenau Ffestiniog, where he gets a job in the Llechwedd slate quarries, lodging with Ben O’Hara and his wife Nanwen. Toby starts as a ‘rubbisher’ (labourer), before learning the dangerous job of rockman.

The O’Hara's, Toby and his grandfather move into a new cottage in Bethesda and Toby goes for a job with the quarries owned by Lord Penrhyn. Toby realises that he loves Nan and also renews acquaintance with the promiscuous Bron, whom he knew in the workhouse, now working as a barmaid. Bron has a son whom she knows as ‘Bibs’ by an unknown father.

The men working at the Big Hole strike over poor conditions and the quarries are closed by Lord Penrhyn. Several hundred men, forced by starvation, break the strike and are denounced as bradwr (traitors). Bron is cast out of her chapel for adultery with Sam Jones, Toby's one-time friend. Toby's grandfather commits suicide. Ben is found to have embezzled Combination strike relief funds; he and Nanwen are expelled from the community and it is supposed that they have gone to Ireland.

Over several years, Toby makes his way through Mid-Wales, lodging where he can and working as farm labourer, longshoreman, ostler, blacksmith's assistant. haulier, barman and even fighting as a bare-knuckle boxer in Brecon. He works in the Blaenavon coalmines and Merthyr ironworks. By 1910, he has returned to Tonypandy, the town of his birth. He finds lodgings and a job in the Ely mine; in a pub he meets Bron, still a barmaid, now married to Sam but separated. He moves lodgings to be with her.

Toby becomes lodge treasurer. He learns that Sam Jones is living in Porth and that he and Bron still see each other occasionally. She refuses to stop seeing him, and Toby and Bron drift apart, whilst still living in the same house. Toby discovers that Nan and Ben now live in Senghenydd; he goes to visit them one day. Ben is still a brutal drunkard and when he leaves for the pub, Toby confesses that he still loves Nan.

The coal owners refuse to negotiate the wage for coal from the difficult and wet Bute seam Toby is working on. The pit workers talk openly of strike action, but then the owners lock all the miners out. A major strike is precipitated and large contingents of police arrive in the Rhondda. The onset of cold weather sees people, especially children and old people, dying of cold and starvation, but still the owners will not negotiate the wage rates.

Wild rumours circulate that Winston Churchill, the Home Secretary, has been seen on horseback riding the streets of Tonypandy with the Chief Constable.

The miners lose confidence in their representatives, and march to shut down a mine that has been taken over by management and is operating on blackleg labour. Toby is in the midst of a violent confrontation between miners and police. Both he and Bron and many of their friends are injured. Soldiers arrive in the Rhondda but there are no confrontations with them.

Toby, as lodge treasurer, continues to draw monies from the bank and distribute ten shillings each week to the miners; barely enough to live on. Starving people are forced to steal waste coal and kill sheep to put hot food on the table. One dark night, Toby breaks into a pub in Pontypridd and steals jewellery, which he pawns.

As Bron slowly recovers from her injuries, Toby decides that he must make a break from her. He decides to leave the Rhondda and seek work at Universal Colliery in Senghennydd, which is not on strike. He finds that Ben has been killed in an accident underground and renews his friendship with Nanwen, who now has a daughter, Ceinwen, But police have followed him and he's arrested for the theft.

Toby serves two years in Cardiff jail; he is regularly visited by his mates and receives letters from Nan, now a schoolmistress in Senghennyd. But he hears nothing from Bron. On his release, he returns to Porth, hoping to see Bron, but gets drunk, is thrown out of the pub and is brought back to Senghennyd by his mates. He lodges with Mrs Best, but in the small hours, he slips out of the house and goes to see Nan, who still loves him. He falls into the habit of regularly visiting her, whilst still lodging with Mrs Best.

Toby, working at the Universal, takes part in a mine rescue, and is devastated when several of his best mates are killed. By unspoken consent, he and Nanwen decide to marry, but she insists that they return north, before Toby is killed by the coal.

On the morning that they plan to catch a train to North Wales, a massive explosion occurs at the Universal. Toby, who has just started his morning shift, is badly injured. He is trapped with his mates, and they can only hope and pray that the rescue team will get to them in time. The heat from the fire and the diminishing air quality cause many to lose hope, but eventually the rescuers break through. On return to the surface, Toby realises that he can no longer see more than a vague blur. The attending doctors ascribe this to his head injury. Nan and her daughter Ceinwen come to the pithead, but Ceinwen flees in terror and Nan runs off after her.

Later, Bron reveals to Toby that Nan and her daughter have gone to North Wales - alone - and that Bron encouraged them to do so. She tells Toby that Nan was scared of being married to a blind man. She also informs Toby that she has a second baby, known as Bibs-two, who is Toby's child.

The novel ends on an uncertain note; Bron and Toby seem to be fated for each other, but she is technically still married to Sam Jones, who also survived the explosion.

== Dedication ==
The author dedicates the novel to 'the old gentlemen of Industry - sought out in homes for the aged, their little front rooms, in the street and on park benches......without the aid of such men this book could not have been written'.
