= The Race of the Tiger =

Historical novel by Alexander Cordell

- First US edition
- Author: Alexander Cordell
- Language: English
- Publisher: Doubleday (US); Gollancz (UK)
- Publication date: 1963
- Publication place: UK
- Media type: Print (Hardback)
- Pages: 347
- OCLC: 1053253

The Race of the Tiger is an historical novel by the Welsh writer Alexander Cordell (1914–1997) set in mid-19th century Pittsburgh, Pennsylvania.

It is a family saga of the O'Haras of Connemara, Ireland, who flee the English yoke to make their fortune in the New World, where iron barons such as Andrew Carnegie and Henry Clay Frick thrive in an era of unprecedented industrial growth. Labor agitation, violence, and the Molly Maguire movement erupt in Pittsburgh's steel industry when the new Bessemer process throws many Irish immigrants out of work in the 1870s.
