= Blackleg Miner =

English folk song

Song

Music video
- "Blackleg Miner" on YouTube

"Blackleg Miner" is a 19th-century English folk song from Northumbria. Its Roud number is 3193. The song is one of the most controversial English folk songs owing to its depiction of violence against strikebreakers.

== Origins ==
The song is believed to originate from the miners' lockout of 1844. Although this was a national lock-out, the language of the song suggests that it refers to the dispute in the north-east coalfield, which lasted roughly 20 weeks. The lockout largely collapsed as a result of "blackleg" labour.

The village of Seghill, mentioned in the song, was the site of a mass eviction of striking miners during the 1844 lockout. Thomas Burt wrote of the situation:

the very magnitude of the evictions, extending over nearly the whole of the mining districts of Northumberland and Durham, made it impossible to find house accommodation for a twentieth part of the evicted. Scores of the Seghill families camped out by the roadside between that village and the Avenue Head.

The song depicts the determined, uncompromising stance against strikebreakers adopted by unionized strikers. Some say that the term blackleg for a strikebreaker has its origins in coal mining, as strikebreakers would return covered in black coal dust which would give away that they had been working whilst others had been on strike.

Another folk etymology suggests that the "moleskin pants" mentioned in the song would be made of black Mole pelts, thus giving rise to the name. However, mole pelt trousers would be unimaginably expensive to a miner, and the lyric instead refers to common hard-wearing cotton moleskin trousers.

The coal-mining sector in the UK was always heavily unionised, and mining strikes such as in 1926, 1974 and 1984-5 have had big impacts on British society. The strikes caused bitterness both within and between pit communities, but also gave rise to expressions of solidarity such as sympathy strikes, material assistance such as food, and a feeling of belonging to a proud and powerful community of workers.

The lyrics describe tactics common for attacking strikebreakers in the 19th century. Across the way they stretch a line/ To catch the throat and break the spine/ Of the dirty blackleg miner describes how a rope was often stretched across the entrance to a colliery to catch strikebreakers by the throat and flick them backwards, often causing them to injure themselves through falling. Strikebreakers were often stripped of their clothes and working tools once caught.

== Revival ==
For a period in the 1960s and 1970s, the song's uncompromising lyrics were appreciated for their directness and militancy by many young people radicalised by the student rebellions of 1968, and the song was often sung at folk music societies. In particular, a 1970 recording by Steeleye Span became very popular.

The album's sleeve notes read:

It is strange that a song as powerful and as singable as this should be so rare, yet it has only once been collected, from a man in Bishop Auckland, County Durham, in 1949. Seghill and Seaton Delaval (presumably the Delaval mentioned in the song) are adjacent mining villages about six miles north of Newcastle upon Tyne, but it is difficult to date the song due to the innumerable mining strikes which have occurred. It is, however, interesting as much as it illustrates the violent hatred felt by the “union” men towards the blacklegs. Ashley Hutchings: "This is the most modern traditional song on the album, possibly dating from the early part of the 20th Century, and is sometimes sung by singers from Northumberland. I believe it was suggested by Tim."

This was not entirely accurate: the song had been released on a number of records of miners' songs in the 1960s and also featured on Ray and Archie Fisher's 1964 album The Hoot'nanny Show Volume 2. In addition, the song dated from the 1844 strike – much earlier than indicated by Steeleye Span.

Ewan MacColl noted a variant named The Blackleg Leaders, sung when union leaders did not support unofficial strikes.

== Use in 1984–85 strike ==
The song gained another revival during the hard-fought strike of the 1980s, and playing it became a political statement in support of the strike. The Steeleye Span recording was often played to intimidate working miners.

Violent clashes during the 1980s strike (most notably the attacks on Michael Fletcher and David Wilkie) made some uncomfortable with the song's advocacy of violence against strikebreakers. Some folk clubs avoided the song for this reason.

"Blackleg Miner" has been unwelcome in areas where most miners worked through the 1984-85 strike, such as Nottinghamshire and Leicestershire. However, there has also been an increase in bands covering the song since the strike.

Scottish folk musician Dick Gaughan wrote of the change in attitude to the song after the strike of 1984-5:

many folksong-loving conservatives who the previous year would have quite cheerfully sung that quaint old ditty, "Blackleg Miner", were suddenly forced to confront the unpalatable fact that what they had always regarded as a harmless little song about some far-off past events was in reality a venomous attack on scab labour and that it was now impossible to sing it without that being interpreted as a thunderous declaration of support for the NUM.

== Covers ==
The song is still performed regularly in setlists by Steeleye Span. After their initial 1970 recording on Hark! The Village Wait, they recorded a second version with their 1986 album Back in Line, a third version on the 2002 release Present – The Very Best of Steeleye Span and a fourth version on the 2006 release Folk Rock Pioneers in Concert. The band's recordings put great stress on the line that threatens death against strikebreakers. The village of Seghill has been modified to "Cleghill" in the second, third and fourth recordings (but not the first).

Other artists to have played this song include Ferocious Dog, the Ian Campbell Folk Group, the High Level Ranters, Highland Reign, the Houghton Weavers, Broom Bezzums, Ryan's Fancy, the New Minstrel Revue, Blue Horses, New Celeste, FinTan, Duo Noir, Cameron Muir, Smoky Finish and Clatterbone, Len Wallace, John Maggs, Seven Nations, Sol Invictus, Louis Killen, the Angelic Upstarts as well as Richard Thompson, Ewan MacColl, Dick Gaughan, Aengus Finnan, Jon Boden, Maddy Prior, Andy Wainwright, John Hewitt, The Inchtabokatables, Banjax, Eric Fish, The Dixie Bee-Liners, Settlers Match and David Wrench with Black Sheep, Offa Rex (Olivia Chaney & The Decemberists)

In November 2023, Vince Clarke of Erasure released a version of "Blackleg" on his album "Songs Of Silence".

== Lyrics ==
In the Northumbrian dialect, the word work rhymes with dark. However, virtually all singers do not rhyme the first two lines of the song. Ewan MacColl (1978) is one of the exceptions, as he attempted to sing the song with Northumbrian pronunciation throughout. Divvint gan is Northumbrian dialect for don't go. Some versions say dinna gang, which is the dialect for an area slightly further north, in Scotland.

It's in the evening after dark,
When the blackleg miner creeps to work,
With his moleskin pants and dirty shirt,
There gans the blackleg miner!

Well he takes his tools and doon he gans
To hew the coal that lies below,
There's not a woman in this town-row
Will look at the blackleg miner.

Oh, Delaval is a terrible place.
They rub wet clay in the blackleg's face,
And aroond the heaps they run a foot race,
To catch the blackleg miner!

So, divvint gan near the Seghill mine.
Across the way they stretch a line,
To catch the throat and break the spine
Of the dirty blackleg miner.

They grab his duds and his pick as well,
And they hoy them down the pit of hell.
Doon ye gan, and fare ye well,
You dirty blackleg miner!

So join the union while you may.
Divvint wait till your dying day,
For that may not be far away,
You dirty blackleg miner!

== See also ==
- Scotch Cattle
