= Ceffyl Pren =

Former ritual humiliation in Wales

The Ceffyl Pren ("wooden horse") is a term referring to a former local form of punishment practiced in rural Wales, a Welsh form of mob justice. It was a form of ritual humiliation in which offenders would be paraded around the village tied to a wooden frame, sometimes at night, by a mob carrying torches. The custom was similar to practices known in England as "rough music" or in Scotland as "riding the stang".

== History ==
Ceffyl Pren seems to have persisted until the mid 19th century, having its roots in older Welsh laws which were officially discarded during the legal reforms of the Tudor era. In later times, an effigy was sometimes burned instead. The crimes which were punished by the community led punishments were often to do with domestic violence or deviance from the expected norms or moral standards. The crime and its punishment were used to reinforce standards of community behaviours.

The justice of the Ceffyl Pren was administered by a jury led by a foreman, with all of the men involved seeking anonymity through the use of blackened faces and female garb. This tradition led to the adoption of "female impersonation" as one of the key features of the Rebecca Riots which swept across South and West Wales in the period 1839–1844 in protest against tollgate charges and the corruption of the Turnpike Trusts.

Adulterers, harsh landlords, the fathers of bastard children who hid behind the hated provisions of the 19th century Poor Law making the mother entirely responsible for her own predicament, all faced the frightening, embarrassing (and not infrequently painful) effects of these riotous affairs.

In 1844, a man in Llanbadarn Trefegwys, Ceredigion was accused of beating his wife and tried to resist the Ceffyl Pren. He was accidentally killed by the mob.

The last well recorded instance of Ceffyl Pren was in 1852 connected to Craig-y-Borion farmhouse in Llanteg, near Amroth, east Pembrokeshire, but unusually was raised against a young woman who was in a relationship with a married man, by the man's wife and female friends. The woman was employed as governess to her lover's children, and was tied to the Ceffyl Pren and paraded around the village by a mob paid by the women. She left the village the next day with her married lover and they are reputed to have moved to New Zealand and become respected teachers. The tradition seems to have continued in Amroth until 1892, through the burning of effigies.

== Legacy ==
A Welsh language rock group from Cardiff took the name Ceffyl Pren in the 1980s, becoming the first Welsh language rock band to tour North America (in 1983 and 1985) and Hong Kong and Bangkok (in 1987).
