= David Davies (Dai'r Cantwr) =

Welsh poet and lay-preacher

David Davies, also known as Dai'r Cantwr (David the singer) (c. 1812–1874), was a Welsh poet and lay-preacher. He was convicted and sentenced to transportation to Australia for his actions during the Rebecca Riots.

== Early life ==
Davies was born in the parish of Llancarfan in about 1812 to John and Mary Davies, his father is believed to have been a tenant of the Duke of Beaufort. Although little of his early personal life is known, in later police records Davies is recorded as a "farm labourer, can plough", and at one time is thought to have worked at a quarry in Newcastle, Bridgend, also serving as a preacher to the local Wesleyans. He is later recorded as attending the Philadelphia Baptist Church in Cadoxton near Barry, one of the earliest Baptist chapels in the area, from which the important Baptist preacher, Christmas Evans is believed to have given sermons. Davies was nicknamed "Dai'r Cantwr", David the Singer, because he "taught them to sing at church".

== Davies' role in the Rebecca Riots ==
On 13 May 1839, the first tollgate was attacked by rioters at Cilymaenllwyd, in an uprising by poor farmers, angry at what they believed were unjust taxations. By 26 May, the first phase of the Rebecca Riots ended with the destruction of the Water Street gate in Carmarthen. On 17 July of that year, the first instance is recorded of a group of rioters being led by a male ring leader dressed in women's clothing, widely accepted to be Thomas Rees. The dressing of the mob leaders as women was a symbolic gesture, in reference to a Biblical text, Genesis 24:60. At some point during the riots, until their end in late 1843, Davies became heavily involved, and like fellow rioter Shoni Sguborfawr, was paid to take a prominent role in the toll-gate attacks.

Although there are multiple theories of how the two men met, Davies and 'Shoni' became associated in several acts of incendiarism and gate-breaking. The riots were initially supported by the public, and very few rioters were arrested and convicted, but some of those taking part used the guise of 'Rebecca' to exact revenge on individuals and extort money; and Davies and 'Shoni' both undertook these actions. Eventually people turned on both men and on 24 September 1843, warrants were issued for their arrest. The following day Davies was arrested at the Plough and Harrow a public house in Pum Heol near Llanelli. Shoni Sguborfawr was arrested in London on 26 September. Davies was placed in custody in Carmarthen Goal to await sentence.

== Transportation to Australia and later life ==
On 22 December 1843, Davies was tried at Carmarthen assizes under the charge of demolishing the turnpike at Spudder's Bridge near Kidwelly. Davies was found guilty and was sentenced to transportation for 20 years; 'Shoni' was given a life sentence for attempted murder after shooting a man in Pontyberem.

After sentencing, Davies was held at Carmarthen, and while awaiting transportation he wrote the poem now known as the Threnody of Dai'r Cantwr, described by Professor David Williams as 'not without literary merits'. On 5 February 1844, he was moved to the Millbank Penitentiary and remained there until 12 March when he was transported on the London to Van Diemen's Land, modern-day Tasmania. He landed on 10 July and was set to work on Maria Island, just off the country's east coast. After completing his work on the Island, he was placed in the employment of various people, but was unable to stay out of trouble, receiving brief sentences for minor offences, such as insolence, drunkenness and using indecent language.

Davies received his ticket of leave in April 1854, and was conditionally pardoned on 31 October of the same year. Although some claimed he returned to Wales, he seems to have remained in Tasmania, and died there in an outhouse of the Ross Hotel in August 1874, from smoke inhalation after his pipe accidentally set fire to grass, whilst Davies was asleep and intoxicated.

=== Threnody of Dai'r Cantwr ===
- One of the verses of Threnody of Dai'r Cantwr, translated from the original Welsh:

Though wounding were the wicked blows
The cruel world hath struck at me
I have a strength they cannot break
My human pride my dignity
They bound my hands with prison chains
And yet my soul they could not bind
Now far across the sundering sea
I drag my solely troubled mind
My father's home, its tender care
I know I shall not see again
I'll rot for twenty searing years
Among corrupt unfeeling men
Farewell to you a hundredfold
Fair county, sweet untroubled Wales
Still I remember in my pain
Your streams, your hills, your gentle vales
You are the garden of the world
The Eden where all beauty lies
My heart breaks as with flaming sword
They drive me now from paradise

An edited version of the whole poem in the original Welsh is in E. Wyn James, ‘Baled hiraethon Dai’r Cantwr o Lancarfan’, (Colofn ‘Llys a Llan’), Y Dinesydd, 494 (Chwefror 2025), 14-15. An electronic version of the article is to be found here: http://dinesydd.cymru/teithiau/

== See also ==
- List of convicts transported to Australia

== Bibliography ==
- Davies, John; Jenkins, Nigel (2008). The Welsh Academy Encyclopaedia of Wales. Cardiff: University of Wales Press. ISBN 978-0-7083-1953-6.
