= Betsy Riot =

The Betsy Riot is a radical left group that describes itself as a "decentralized neo-suffragette, punk-patriot resistance movement." They support gun control. The group began in August 2016, primarily focused on opposition to the gun industry, but during the first Trump administration the group focused protests on administration policy. The group uses profanity, satire, and a radical feminist posture in its messaging, with tactics that include graffiti, theatrical protests, pranks, and coordinated messaging actions, such as mailings, banners, and flyers. The group has also encouraged vandalism to further their agenda.

As part of an ongoing demonstration against gun rights advocates, Betsy Riot purchased the domain names johnlott.com and waynelapierre.com and runs them as parody sites—they are not the websites of John Lott and Wayne LaPierre.
