= Shoni Sguborfawr =

Welsh criminal (1811–1858)

Shoni Sguborfawr or Sioni Ysgubor Fawr (Johnny of Big Barn) (1811–1858) was a Welsh criminal, most notable for his part in the Rebecca Riots and his subsequent attempts to blackmail fellow rioters.

== Early history ==
Shoni was christened John Jones. Although police records state that he was born in Merthyr Tydfil, the name Sguborfawr was a farm near the village of Penderyn which is situated just a couple of miles away from Merthyr. He also worked as a farm labourer in the Penderyn area.

Little is known about his education, however he was able to read and write to a certain extent. His occupation shifts constantly — as well as a farm hand he is recorded by some as a shaft sinker and others a brass fitter. He later joined the 98th Foot Regiment working for the authorities in Monmouthshire, and at one point was working in Brecon as a special constable during a Brecknock election.

Before he reached 30, Shoni had made a name for himself as a hard man, and was seen as one of the toughest men in 'China', which was an undesirable area of Merthyr where the worst and most desperate of an industrial society found themselves. In 1840, the arrival of the Taff Vale Railway, which made Merthyr the industrial steel manufacturing hub of Britain, was celebrated in 'China' with a bare-knuckle boxing contest between Sguborfawr and Cyfarthfa champion, John Nash.

== The Rebecca Riots ==
In 1843, Sguborfawr went before the Merthyr Magistrates for being drunk and disorderly and brawling in the streets. He escaped a prison sentence, but he was soon in front of the Swansea Magistrates on an identical charge. After these encounters with the magistrates Sguborfawr found work in the village of Pontyberem where he was then hired to take part in the Rebecca Riots. His main acts during the riots were the destruction of turnpike gates, and on 25 August, he was involved in drunken brawling in Pontyberem.

After the riots, Sguborfawr began using extortion to gain money from several farmers, stating he would reveal them to be Rebecca Rioters. He was arrested in Tumble in September for shooting a man at the New Inn in Pontyberem, and in December was sentenced at Carmarthen assizes to be transported from Britain. After his sentence was read, he laughed and revealed the names of some of his criminal associates.

Sguborfawr was first placed in Carmarthen jail (Carchar Caerfyrddin) before being moved to Millbank Penitentiary in 1844. There, he was housed with fellow convicted rioter David Davies, but the men were separated when Sguborfawr was transported on the Blunell, reaching Norfolk Island on 6 July.

He remained at the penitentiary station on the island until 8 April 1847 when he was transferred to Van Diemen's Land, Tasmania. Although placed with several masters, much like his trouble making in Britain, Sguborfawr continued to be anti-social and aggressive; this time his acts included stealing along with being drunk and disorderly.

He was awarded a ticket of leave in 1856, and was conditionally pardoned in 1858. A contemporary described Sguborfawr as "a half witted and inebriate ruffian".

== See also ==
- List of convicts transported to Australia

== Bibliography ==
- "Dangerous Disorder : Riots and Violent Disturbances in Thirteen Areas of Britain", Anne Power and Rebecca Tunstall, Laverthorpe: YPS for the Joseph Rowntree Foundation, 1997. ISBN 1-899987-49-5
- "The Rebecca Riots : a Study in Agrarian Discontent", D. Williams, University of Wales Press, 1955. ISBN 9780708309339
