= Strikebreaker =

Person who works despite an ongoing strike

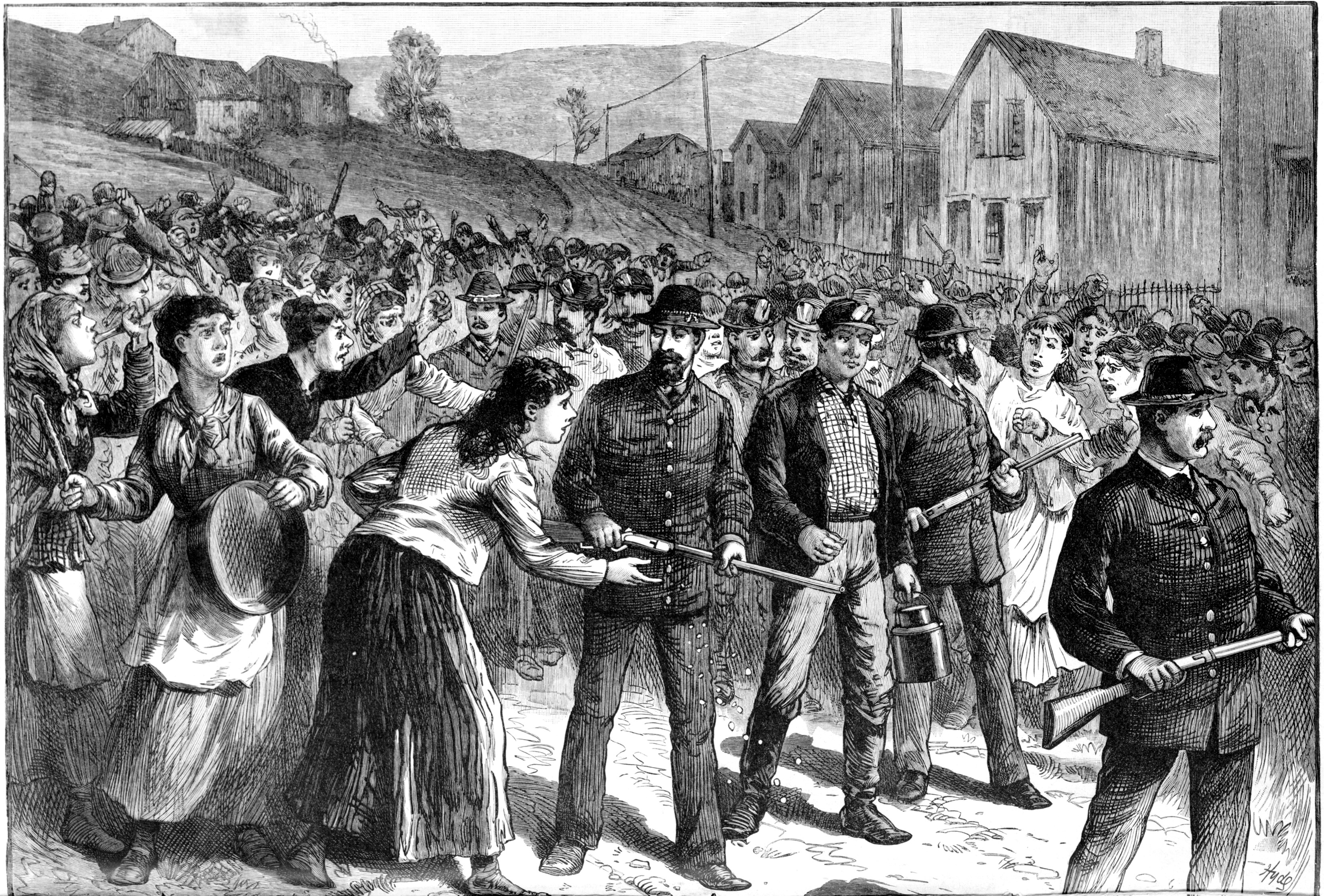
Pinkerton agents escort strikebreakers in Buchtel, Ohio, 1884

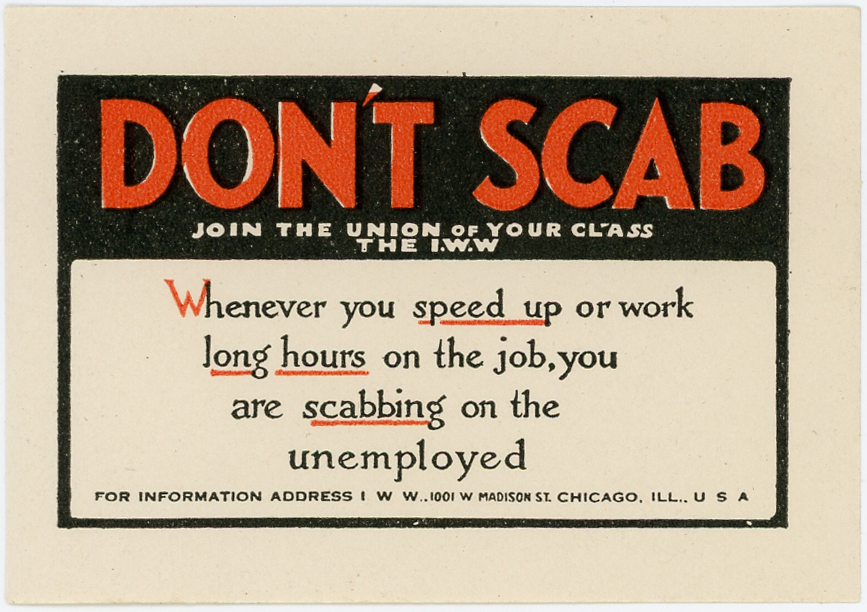
Industrial Workers of the World stickerette "Don't Scab"

A strikebreaker (sometimes pejoratively called a scab, blackleg, bootlicker, blackguard or knobstick) is a person who works despite an ongoing strike. Strikebreakers may be current employees (union members or not), or new hires to keep the organization running (hired after or during the strike). In continuing to work, or taking jobs at a workplace under current strike, strikebreakers are said to "cross picket lines".

Some countries have passed laws outlawing strikebreakers to give more power to trade unions, while other countries have passed right-to-work laws which protect strikebreakers.

== International law ==
=== Freedom of association ===
The freedom of association enshrined in Universal Declaration of Human Rights Article 20 protects both peaceful association and not being "compelled to belong to an association".

=== Right to strike ===
The right to strike is well-established in international law. In particular, the 1966 International Covenant on Economic, Social and Cultural Rights establishes: "The right to strike, provided that it is exercised in conformity with the laws of the particular country." The International Labour Organization (ILO) Committee on Freedom of Association and other ILO bodies have interpreted all core ILO conventions as protecting the right to strike as an essential element of the freedom of association as well as the freedom for workers to organize and established principles on the right to strike through rulings. For example, the ILO has ruled that "the right to strike is an intrinsic corollary of the right of association protected by Convention No. 87."

The European Social Charter of 1961 was the first international agreement to expressly protect the right to strike. Similar to international law, the European Union's Community Charter of the Fundamental Social Rights of Workers permits EU member states to regulate the right to strike.

=== Striker replacement ===
Striker replacement (hiring workers to replace striking workers during the course of a strike) is not banned or restricted by international law. However, the ILO has concluded striker replacement, while not in contravention of ILO agreements, carries with it significant risks for abuse and places trade union freedoms "in grave jeopardy". Regarding permanent replacement rather than just replacement for the duration of the strike, the ILO has held that "this basic right [to strike] is not really guaranteed when a worker who exercises it legally runs the risk of seeing his or her job taken up permanently by another worker."

== National laws ==
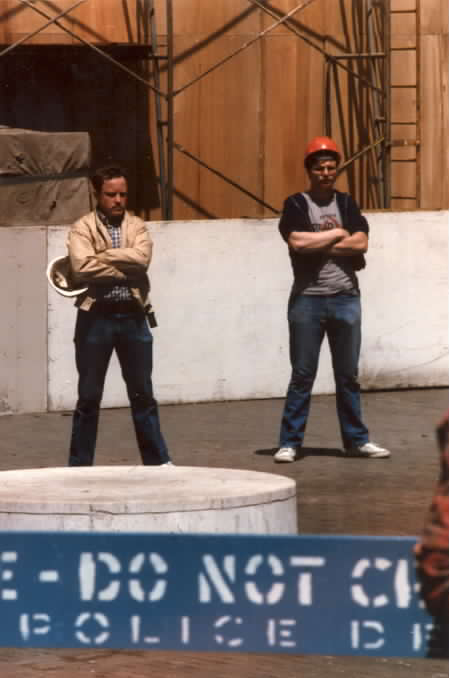
Strikebreakers outside the Chicago Tribune during a 1986 strike

=== Asia ===
- Japanese labour law significantly restricts the ability of both an employer and a union to engage in labor disputes. The law highly regulates labor relations to ensure labor peace and channel conflict into collective bargaining, mediation and arbitration. It bans the use of strikebreakers.
- South Korea bans the use of strikebreakers, although the practice remains common.

=== Europe ===
In most European countries, strikebreakers are rarely used. Consequently, they are rarely if ever mentioned in most European national labor laws. As mentioned above, it is left to the European Union member states to determine their own policies.

- Germany has employment law that protects worker rights, and trade unions and the right to strike are enshrined in the constitution. The Bundesarbeitsgericht (the Federal Labour Court) and the Bundesverfassungsgericht (the Federal Constitutional Court) have, however, issued a large number of rulings which essentially regulate trade union activities such as strikes. Work councils, for example, may not strike at all, but trade unions retain an almost unlimited ability to strike. The widespread use of work councils, however, channels most labor disputes and reduces the likelihood of strikes. Efforts to enact a comprehensive federal labor relations law that regulates strikes, lockouts and the use of strikebreakers failed.
- The United Kingdom's laws permit strikebreaking, and courts have significantly restricted the right of unions to punish members who act as strikebreakers.
- The Netherlands does not explicitly forbid the practice of strikebreaking but has a law in place that prevents companies from hiring temporary employees through a temp agency.

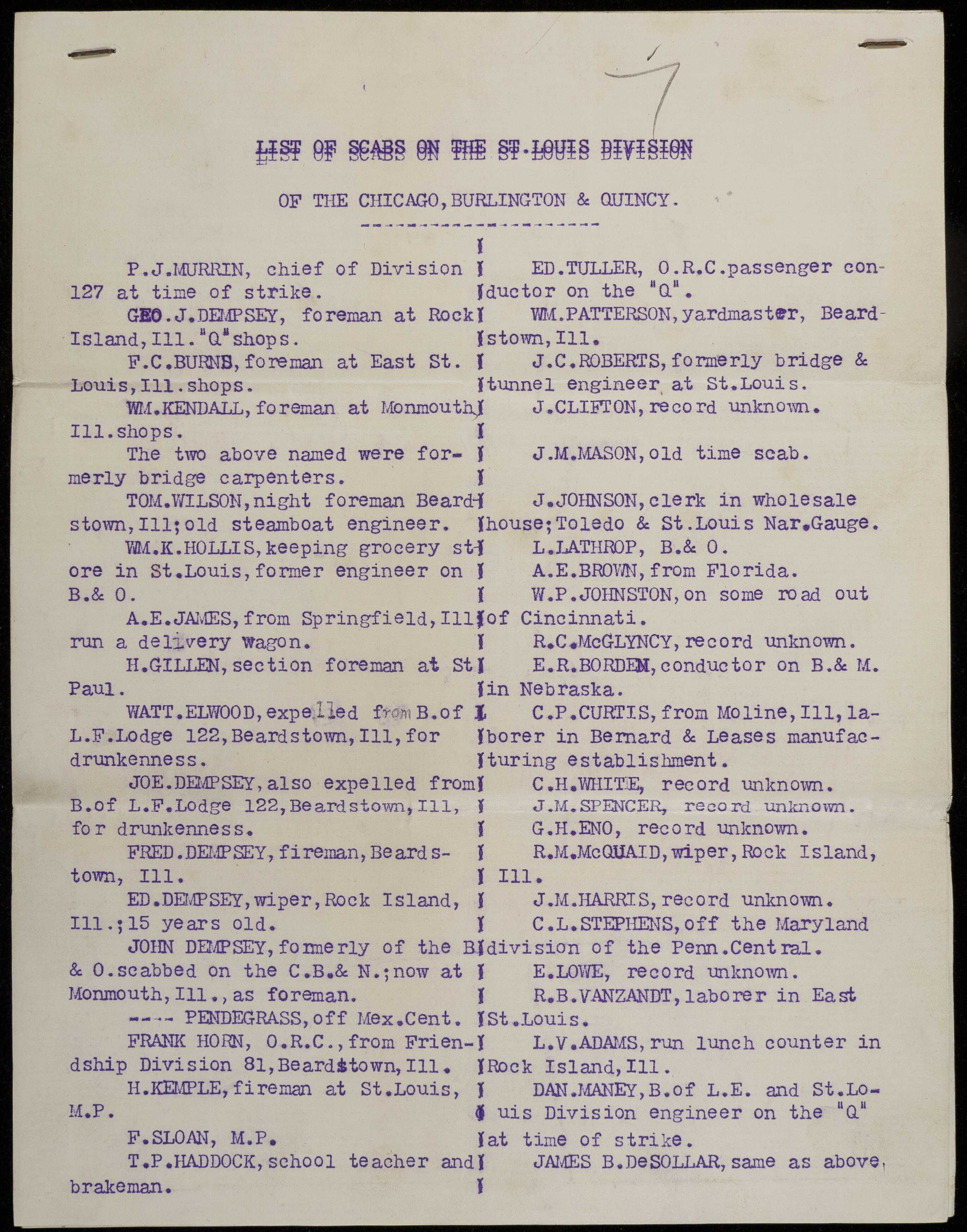
List of St. Louis CB&Q scabs compiled by the Brotherhood of Locomotive Engineers, 1888

=== North America ===
- Canada has federal industrial relations laws that strongly regulate the use of strikebreakers. Although many Canadian labor unions today advocate for even stronger regulations, scholars point out that Canadian labor law has far greater protections for union members and the right to strike than American labor law, which has significantly influenced the development of labor relations in Canada. In Quebec, the use of strikebreakers is illegal, but companies may try to remain open with only managerial personnel.
- Mexico has a federal labor law that requires companies to cease operations during a legal strike, effectively preventing the use of strikebreakers.
- As of 2002, strikebreakers were used far more frequently in the United States than in other industrialized countries. The U.S. Supreme Court held in NLRB v. Mackay Radio & Telegraph Co., 304 U.S. 333 (1938) that an employer may not discriminate on the basis of union activity in reinstating employees at the end of a strike. The ruling effectively encourages employers to hire strikebreakers so that the union loses majority support in the workplace when the strike ends. The Mackay court also held that employers enjoy the unrestricted right to permanently replace strikers with strikebreakers, which in essence is, according to law professor Matthew Dimick, a permission "for firing employees for striking." A Human Rights Watch report in 2000 concluded that the U.S. "is almost alone in the world in allowing permanent replacement of workers who exercise the right to strike."

== Etymology and synonyms ==
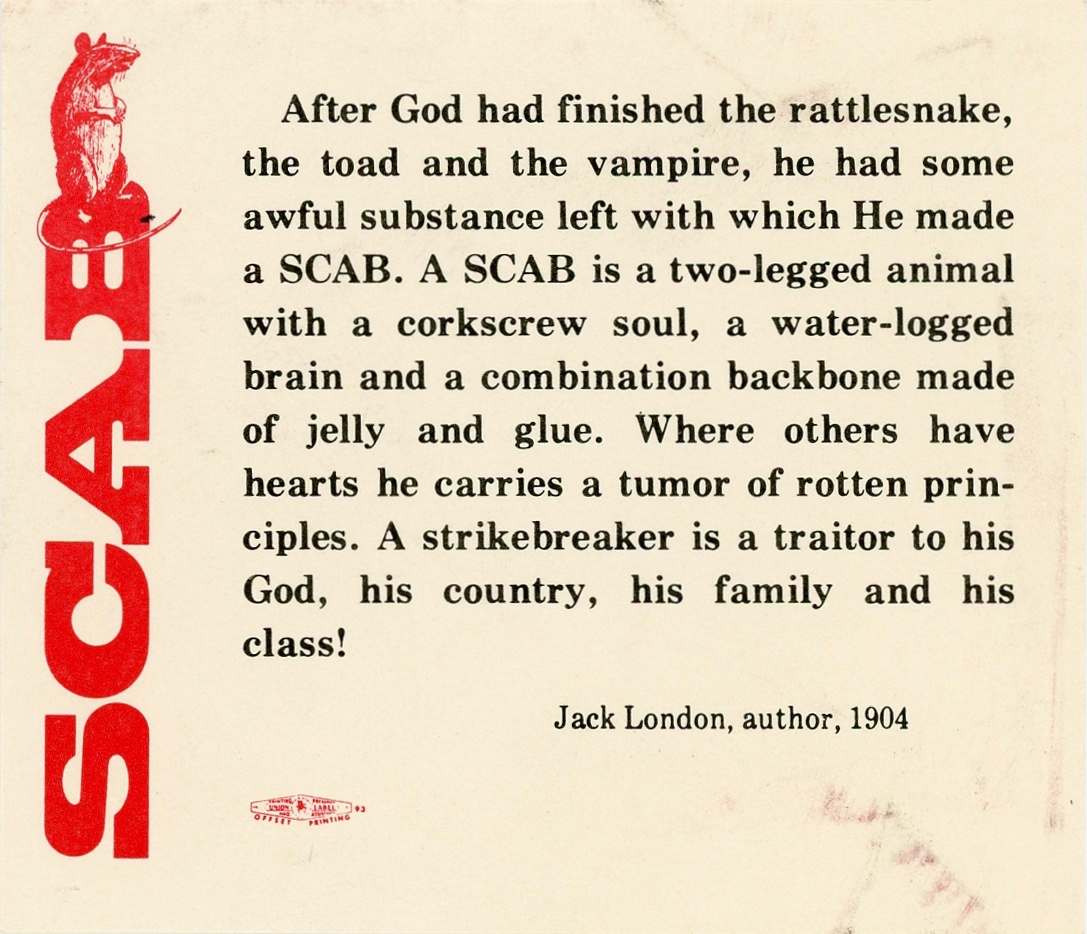
Industrial Workers of the World stickerette - The Scab, attributed to Jack London

Strikebreaking is also known as black-legging or blacklegging. The American lexicographer Stephanie Smith suggests that the word's etymology is connected with shoeshiners or shoe polish, as an early occurrence of the word used in conjunction with an 1803 bootmaker's strike in the US. However, the British industrial relations expert J. G. Riddall claimed that it may have a racist connotation, as in 1859 a striker in London threatened strikebreakers by stating: "If you dare work we shall consider you as blacks".

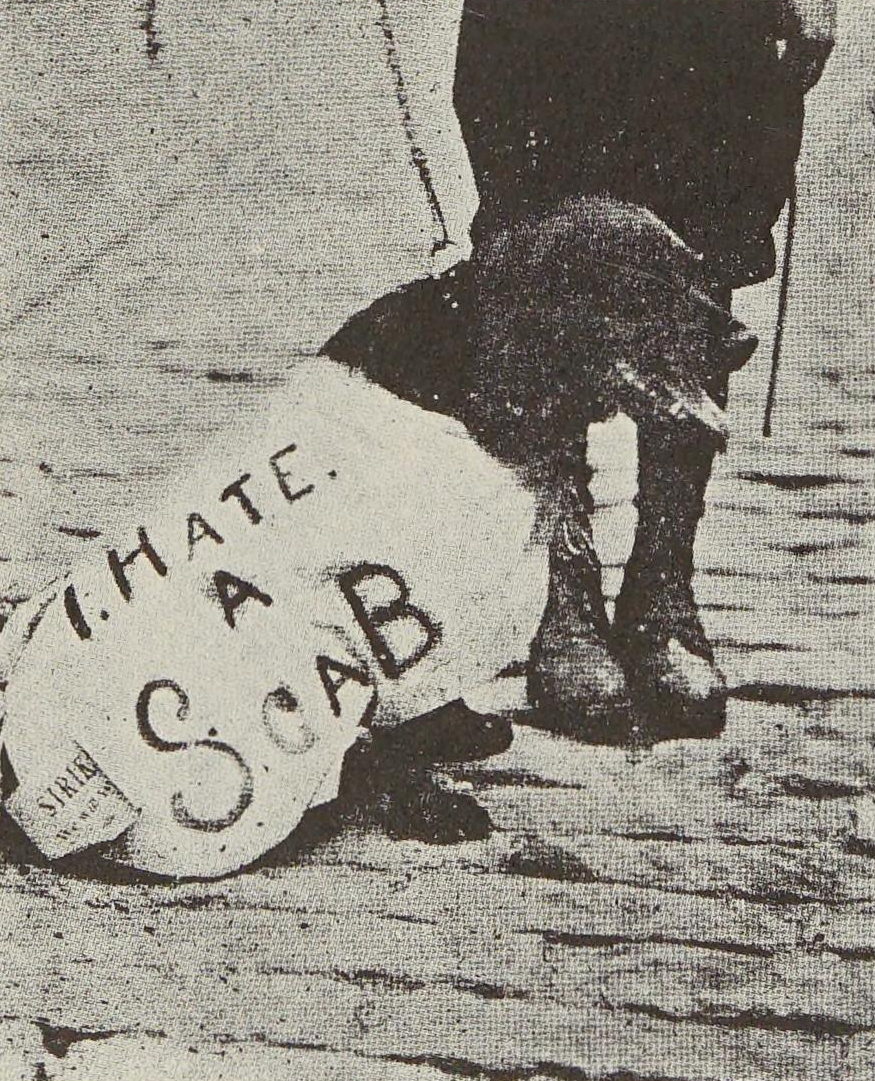
A dog wearing a sign reading "I Hate a Scab" during the 1910 Columbus streetcar strike

The lexicographer Geoffrey Hughes, however, notes that blackleg and scab are both references to disease, as in the blackleg bacterial disease. He dates the first use of the term blackleg in reference to strikebreaking to the 1859 London strike. The use of the term blackleg for a strikebreaker was, however, previously recorded in England in 1832 during the trial of a special constable for killing a striking pitman near Chirton. Hughes observes that the term was once generally used to indicate a scoundrel, a villain or a disreputable person.

The Northumberland folk song "Blackleg Miner" is believed to originate from the 1844 strike, which would predate Hughes's reference. The song is thought to originate from the 1844 Miners' Lockout in the North East Coalfield. David John Douglass claims that the term blackleg has its origins in coal mining, as strikebreakers would often neglect to wash their legs, which would give away that they had been working whilst others had been on strike. John McIlroy has suggested that there is a distinction between a blackleg and a scab. He defines a scab as an outsider who is recruited to replace a striking worker, whereas a blackleg is one already employed who goes against a democratic decision of their colleagues to strike, and instead continues to work.

The fact that McIlroy specified that this should be a "democratic" decision has led the historian David Amos to question whether the Nottinghamshire miners in 1984–85 were true blacklegs, given the lack of a democratic vote on the strike.: "If we use McIlroy's interpretation can the Nottinghamshire miners of 1984-85 be seen to have been 'blacklegging' as against 'scabbing'? However, there is one contentious point in McIlroy's interpretation, the breaking of the 'democratic process'. It is because there was some debate over the democratic process in the 1984-85 miners' strike that the question is raised as to whether the working Nottinghamshire miners were scabs at all." Strikebreakers have also been known as knobsticks. The term appears derived from the word knob, in the sense of something that sticks out, and from the card-playing term nob, as someone who cheats.

== See also ==
- Molly Maguires
- "Blackleg Miner" (song)
- Mohawk Valley formula

== References and further reading ==
- Amos, David (December 2011). "THE NOTTINGHAMSHIRE MINERS', THE UNION OF DEMOCRATIC MINEWORKERS AND THE 1984-85 MINERS STRIKE: SCABS OR SCAPEGOATS?" (PDF). University of Nottingham. pp. 293–4.
- Committee on Freedom of Association. International Labour Organization. Digest of Decisions of the Committee on Freedom of Association. 5th (revised) ed. Geneva: International Labour Organization, 2006.
- Dau-Schmidt, Kenneth Glenn. "Labor Law and Industrial Peace: A Comparative Analysis of the United States, the United Kingdom, Germany, and Japan Under the Bargaining Model." Tulane Journal of International & Comparative Law. 2000.
- Ewing, Keith. "Laws Against Strikes Revisited." In Future of Labour Law. Catharine Barnard, Gillian S. Morris, and Simon Deakin, eds. Oxford: Hart Publishing, 2004. ISBN 9781841134048
- Hughes, Geoffrey. An Encyclopedia of Swearing: The Social History of Oaths, Profanity, Foul Language, and Ethnic Slurs in the English-Speaking World. Armonk, N.Y.: M.E. Sharpe, 2006.
- International Labour Organization. Freedom of Association and Collective Bargaining: General Survey of the Reports on the Freedom of Association and the Right to Organise Convention (No. 87), 1948, and the Right to Organise and Collective Bargaining Convention (no. 98), 1949. Geneva: International Labour Organization, 1994.
- Körner, Marita. "German Labor Law in Transition." German Law Journal. 6:4 (April 2005).
- Logan, John. "How 'Anti-Union' Laws Saved Canadian Labour: Certification and Striker Replacements in Post-War Industrial Relations." Relations Industrielles/Industrial Relations. 57:1 (January 2002).
- Parry, Richard Lloyd. "Labour Law Draws Roar of Rage From Asian Tiger." The Independent. January 18, 1997.
- Riddall, J.G. The Law of Industrial Relations. London: Butterworths, 1982.
- Schillinger, Stephen (2012). "Begging at the Gate: Jack Straw and the Acting Out of Popular Rebellion". In Cerasano, S.P. (ed.). Medieval and Renaissance Drama in England. Vol. 21. Madison, Wisc.: Fairleigh Dickinson University Press. ISBN 9780838643976.
- Silver, Beverly J. Forces of Labor: Workers' Movements and Globalization Since 1870. New York: Cambridge University Press, 2003. ISBN 0521520770
- Smith, Stephanie. Household Words: Bloomers, Sucker, Bombshell, Scab, Nigger, Cyber. Minneapolis: University of Minnesota Press, 2006. ISBN 0816645531
- Sugeno, Kazuo and Kanowitz, Leo. Japanese Employment and Labor Law. Durham, N.C.: Carolina Academic Press, 2002. ISBN 0890896119
- Westfall, David and Thusing, Gregor. "Strikes and Lockouts in Germany and Under Federal Legislation in the United States: A Comparative Analysis." Boston College International & Comparative Law Review. 22 (1999).

=== United States ===
- Arnesen, Eric. "Specter of the Black Strikebreaker: Race, Employment, and Labor Activism in the Industrial Era." Labor History 44.3 (2003): 319-335 online.
- Erlich, Richard L. "Immigrant strikebreaking activity: A sampling of opinion expressed in the National Labor Tribune, 1878-1885." Labor History (1974) 15: 529–42.
- Getman, Julius G. and Kohler, Thomas C. "The Story of NLRB v. Mackay Radio & Telegraph Co.: The High Cost of Solidarity." In Labor Law Stories. Laura J. Cooper and Catherine L. Fisk, eds. New York: Foundation Press, 2005. ISBN 1587788756
- Human Rights Watch. Unfair Advantage: Workers' Freedom of Association in the United States Under International Human Rights Standards. Washington, D.C.: Human Rights Watch, 2000. ISBN 1564322513
- Isaac, Larry W., Rachel G. McKane, and Anna W. Jacobs. "Pitting the Working Class against Itself: Solidarity, Strikebreaking, and Strike Outcomes in the Early US Labor Movement." Social Science History 46.2 (2022): 315–348. online
- Keiser, John H. "Black Strikebreakers and Racism in Illinois, 1865-1900." Journal of Illinois State Historical Society (1972) 65: 313–26.
- Noon, Mark. " 'It ain't your color, it's your scabbing': literary depictions of African American strikebreakers." African American Review 38.3 (2004): 429–439.
- Norwood, Stephen H. Strikebreaking & Intimidation: Mercenaries and Masculinity in Twentieth-Century America Chapel Hill, N.C.: University of North Carolina Press, 2002. ISBN 0807827053 online review
- Rosenbloom, Joshua L. “Strikebreaking and the labor market in the United States, 1881–1894.” Journal of Economic History (1998) 58 (1): 183–205.
- Smith, Robert Michael. From Blackjacks to Briefcases: A History of Commercialized Strikebreaking and Unionbusting in the United States. Athens, Ohio: Ohio University Press, 2003. ISBN 0821414658
- Tuttle, William J. Jr. "Some strikebreakers' observations of industrial warfare." Labor History (1966) 7: I93-96.
- Tuttle, William J. Jr. "Labor conflict and racial violence: The black worker in Chicago, 1894-1919." Labor History (1969) 10: 408–32.
- Whatley, Warren C. "African-American Strikebreaking from the Civil War to the New Deal." Social Science History 17.4 (1993): 525–558. online
