= Carreg Lafar =

Welsh folk band

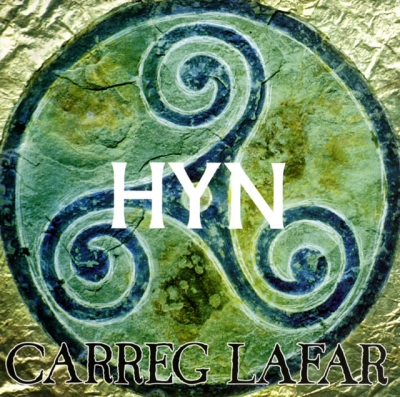
Album cover of Hyn (1998)

Dau Rhosyn Coch ("Two Red Roses", 1998)

Carreg Lafar is a contemporary traditional Welsh folk band. Formed in Cardiff by Rhian Evan-Jones, Antwn Owen-Hicks, James Rourke, Linda Owen Jones, and Simon O'Shea, Carreg Lafar means "a speaking stone", or "echo stone".

Carreg Lafar is one of the bands that has been at the forefront of the Welsh traditional music scene. The group has performed throughout Wales, Brittany, the United States and Canada and uses a mix of traditional and original music to convey a contemporary and fresh approach, whilst staying firmly rooted in the language and tradition of Welsh song and dance music. The material is arranged for traditional and contemporary instruments including fiddle, flute, pibgorn (hornpipe), bagpipes, and guitar, together with dynamic vocals. The group has made three albums with Sain Records, Ysbryd y Werin (Welsh: Spirit of the People), Hyn (Welsh: This) and Profiad (Welsh: Experience).

Carreg Lafar released their debut album Ysbryd y Werin in November 1995. The album received great reviews from the folk music press in the UK and North America. In 1997, Carreg Lafar launched Ysbryd y Werin in North America with a two-week tour of the States.

The band's second album, Hyn, was released in August 1998 and also received rave reviews in folk and roots music magazines in the UK and North America. Living Tradition called it "Welsh folk music at its best."

The band launched its third album, Profiad, in August 2002, at the Lorient Interceltic Festival in Brittany. Living Tradition magazine said that "This (Profiad) is the most impressive album yet from Welsh band Carreg Lafar." and "I hope....they are able to use this terrific album as a springboard to the wider audience they so obviously deserve." fRoots magazine also reviewed Profiad. "At a time when so many Welsh releases are pushing the envelope and seeking to stand in line with a wider world - all honorable and worthy aims - it's refreshing to come right back to the core and listen to the excellence that Welsh trad, done well, can conjure."

The current line up still includes four of the original band members, Linda Owen Jones (voice), Rhian Evan Jones (fiddle) James Rourke (flute and whistles) and Antwn Owen Hicks (voice, pibgorn, bagpipes and whistle). Since 2007, Danny KilBride has been the guitarist. Other musicians that have performed with the band are; Dylan Davies (guitar), Lawson Dando (guitar and keyboards) Gafin Morgan (pibgorn and bagpipes), Gerard KilBride (pibgorn and bagpipes), Robin Huw Bowen (triple harp) and Andy Mclaughlin (flute, whistle and pibgorn).
