= Meic Stevens =

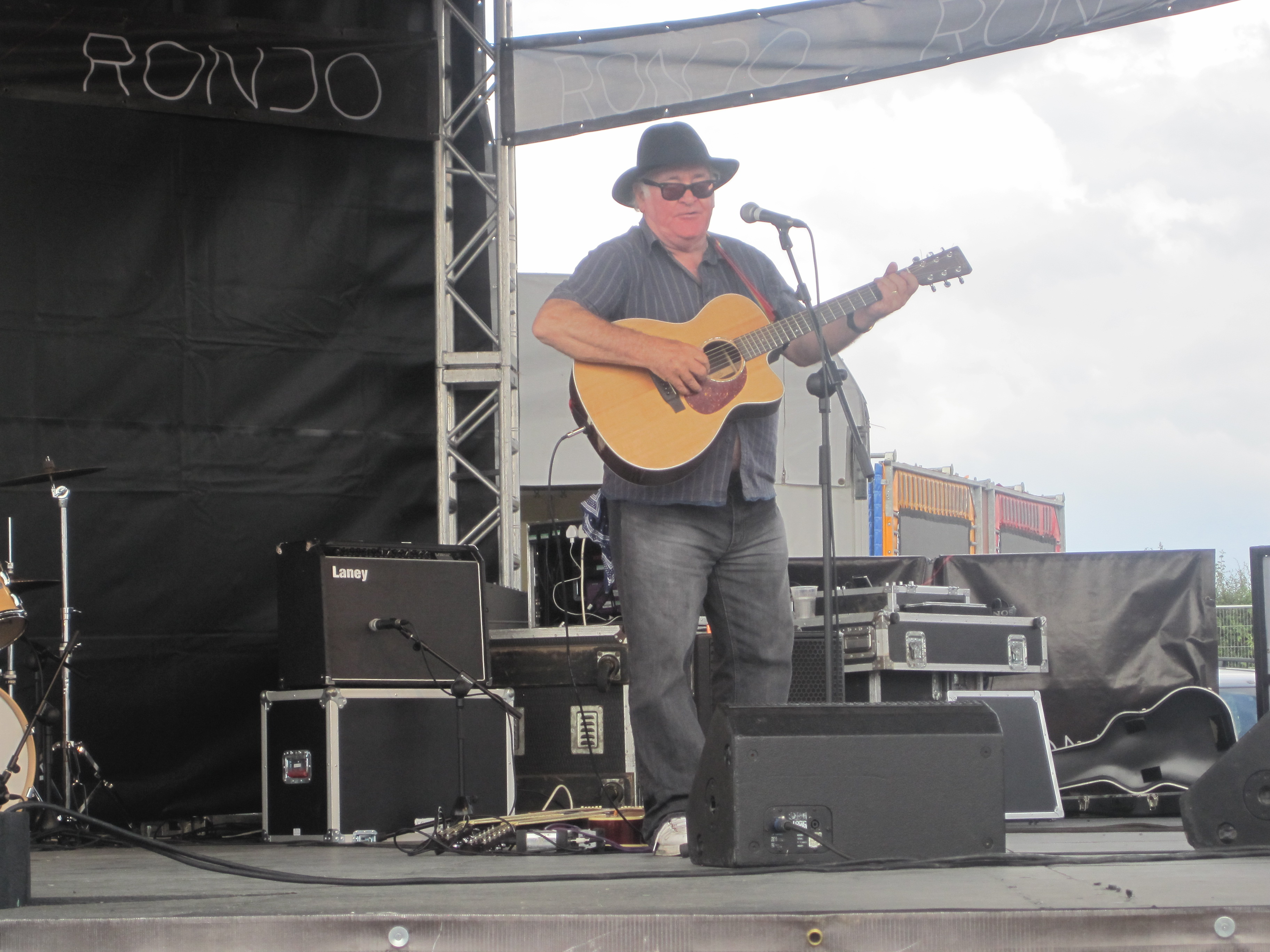
- Eisteddfod Wrecsam, 2011

Background information
- Also known as: Michael Stevens, Y Brawd Hwdini
- Born: Louis Michael James Stevens; 13 March 1942 (age 84); Solva, Pembrokeshire, Wales
- Genres: Rock, folk rock, folk, blues, country
- Occupation: Singer-songwriter
- Instruments: Vocals, guitar, bass, harmonica,
- Years active: 1956–present
- Labels: Warner Bros. Records, Wren, Sain, Tic Toc, Crai, Fflach, Bluetit Records, Tenth Planet, Rhino Handmade, Sunbeam Records
- Website: www.myspace.com/icarwsmeicstevens

Sylvia (2013)

Siwsi'n galw – Meic Stevens

Meic Stevens (born 13 March 1942) is a Welsh singer-songwriter. He has been one of the most prominent figures in the Welsh music scene for over five decades, and played a key role in establishing the popular music scene in Wales. He is described by some as "the Welsh Bob Dylan" and has also been compared favorably with musicians such as Syd Barrett. Stevens's songs are mostly sung in his native Welsh language and have a mystical, faintly psychedelic flavour. His work has influenced groups such as Gorky's Zygotic Mynci and Super Furry Animals. He is largely unknown outside Wales.

== Early life ==
Louis Michael James Stevens was born on 13 March 1942 in Solva, Pembrokeshire in west Wales, to a non-conformist family. He became interested in music in his early teens and persuaded his grandparents to buy him a guitar. He later studied art in Cardiff while performing in bars and nightclubs.

== Career ==
He was discovered by DJ Jimmy Savile, who saw him performing in a Manchester folk club in 1965. This led to Stevens recording his first single as Mike Stevens, "Did I Dream" / "I Saw a Field" for Decca Records. It was arranged by John Paul Jones but was not a success.

In 1967 he suffered mental health problems and returned to his home village of Solva to recuperate. He started to write songs in Welsh and use themes from traditional Welsh music in a conscious effort to create a distinctive Welsh pop music. From 1967 to 1969 he recorded a series of now rare Welsh-language picture sleeve EPs (Mike Stevens, Rhif 2 (Number 2), Mwg (Smoke), Y Brawd Houdini (The Brother Houdini); Meic Stevens, Diolch yn Fawr (Many Thanks), and Byw yn y Wlad (Living in the Country)). These were made for local labels such as Sain and Wren, for whom he was one of the first artistes to record.

He also performed around Britain during the 1960s, as he continued to try to develop a reputation outside Wales. Stevens played on recording sessions (notably for his friend Gary Farr's debut album on the Marmalade label). He made a one-off English language LP, Outlander, for Warner Bros. Records in 1970, but the contract was abandoned by mutual consent. In 1972 Gwymon (Wren Records) was released, an album containing some of his best known songs such as "Gwely Gwag" (Empty bed) and "Merch o'r Fatri Wlân."

Stevens lived in Brittany between 1974 and 1977, performing in many festivals although he did not make any commercial recordings. He returned to Wales in 1977, and recorded Gôg (Sain Records, 1977). In 1978 he self-published the disc Caneuon cynnar, of songs from earlier Wren recordings. He also wrote the music for the rock opera Dic Penderyn, based on events in the Merthyr Rising of 1831. It was staged at the Cardiff National Eisteddfod and had earlier been recorded in Steven's 1972 album Gwymon and the compilation album Disgwyl Rhywbeth Gwell i Ddod.

In 1981, Stevens released a cassette of new songs, Cider Glider (The Farnham Sessions) in English, with the Cadillacs to accompany a return visit to Brittany. This was re-released on Voodoo Blues: 1979-92 by Blue Tit in 1994 with additional tracks.

Nos Du, Nos Da was released on Audio records in 1982 and included songs such as "Môr O Cariad", "Bobby Sands" and "Dic Penderyn". This was followed by Gitâr Yn Y Twll Dan Star (Sain, 1983) that included songs from the lost rock opera Hirdaith A Craith Y Garreg Ddu. He used the Cadillacs once again to record Lapis Lazuli (Sain, 1985) which included the song "Erwan". The album Gwin A Mwg A Merched Drwg (Wine And Smoke And Bad Girls) was released in 1987 only on cassette. The band members included session musicians from London including Brian Godding.

He moved from Sain to the Flach label for Bywyd Ac Angau (Life and Death) in 1989. This was a bilingual album and more folkish in tone. Ware'n Noeth (Bi bop a lwla'r Delyn Aur) was recorded at Les Studio, Bethesda, and this was his first CD, released by Sain in 1991. This was followed by Er Cof Am Blant Y Cwm (In Memory of the Children of the valley), which includes a song of the same name. Stevens continued to make recordings for Sain records, available only on cassette. One was Yn Fwyw (Greater), recorded in the Swroco Tent at the National Eisteddfod of Wales in 1995. In 1998 he collaborated with lyricist Rob Mills to produce the album Mihangel on Crai Records.

Ysbryd Solva (Spirit of Solva) (Sain) was released during the National Eisteddfod at St Davids in 2002, and Meic a'r Gerddorfa (Meic and the Orchestra) was recorded at the Brangwyn Hall in Swansea and the Ysgol Dyffryn Aman Hall in Ammanford with the BBC National Orchestra of Wales and released by Sain Records in 2005. In the later album Icarws (Sain, 2007), Stevens collaborated again with Geraint Jarman. Like Early Songs No. 1 and Ysbryd Solva, this was a collection of his old songs re-recorded.

An Evening With Meic Stevens was recorded in 2007 live at The Half Moon, Putney, London, for Sunbeam, and released with a DVD, the first official one from Stevens. In 2008, his album Gwymon was reissued on the Sunbeam label with two live tracks in addition to the songs on the original album. Another album followed in 2010, Love Songs (Sain) in English. Most of these songs were written in the late 1950s. In August 2011, his latest autobiography, 'Mas o 'Ma', was published.

In 2011, Stevens announced that he wanted to migrate to Canada to join an old girlfriend, Liz, whom he met during his time as an art student in Cardiff in the early 1960s. He played several farewell gigs in Wales before leaving for Canada. However, in 2019 he was back living in Cardiff.

Today Stevens' psych-folk influence can be heard in contemporary Welsh groups such as Super Furry Animals and Gorky's Zygotic Mynci, and his song "Cwm y Pren Helyg" was covered by Alun Tan Lan. Several CDs of his are available from the Sain label in Caernarfon, and two volumes of his classic 1960s EPs have recently appeared on Sunbeam Records.

Stevens can be found occasionally singing in certain pubs/hotels in Aberystwyth. He can also be seen performing regularly throughout Wales and England at major festivals, eisteddfodau, pubs, theatres etc. He performs periodically in France, mainly Brittany where he is popular.

== Albums ==
- Outlander (1970, Warner Bros)
- Gwymon (Wren, 1972)
- Gog (1977, Sain 1065M)
- Caneuon Cynnar (1979, Tic Toc TTL001)
- Nos Du, Nos Da (1982, Sain 82)
- Gitâr yn y Twll dan Stâr (Sain, 1983)
- Lapis Lazuli (Sain, 1985 Sain 1312M)
- Gwin a Mwg a Merched Drwg (Sain, 1987)
- Bywyd ac Angau/Life And Death (Fflach, 1989)
- Ware’n Noeth – Bibopalwla’r Delyn Aur (1991, Sain SCD 4088)
- Er Cof am Blant y Cwm (1993, Crai CD036)
- Y Baledi – Dim ond Cysgodion (1992, Sain SCD 2001)
- Voodoo Blues (1993? Bluetit Records MS1)
- Yn Fyw (1995, Sain)
- Ghost Town (1997, Tenth Planet TP028)
- Mihangel (1998, Crai CD059)
- Ysbryd Solva (2002, Sain SCD 2364)
- September 1965: The Tony Pike Session (2002, Tenth Planet TP056)
- Disgwyl Rhywbeth Gwell i Ddod (2002 Sain SCD 2345)
- Outlander (2003, Rhino Handmade RHM2 7839 re-release)
- Meic a'r Gerddorfa (2005, Sain SCD 2499)
- Rain In The Leaves: The EPs vol. 1 (2006, Sunbeam SBRCD5021)
- Sackcloth & Ashes: The EPs vol. 2 (2007, Sunbeam SBRCD5033)
- Icarws (2007, Sain 2516)
- An Evening With Meic Stevens: Recorded Live In London (2007, Sunbeam SBRCD5039)
- Gwymon (2008, Sunbeam SBRCD5046)
- Love Songs (2010)

== Books ==
Stevens has written three volumes of autobiography:

- Hunangofiant y Brawd Houdini, 2003, Gwasg Gwynedd, ISBN 9780862436971
- Y Crwydryn a Mi, 2009, Y Lolfa, ISBN 9781847711212
- Mâs o 'Mâ, 2011, Y Lolfa, ISBN 9781847713247

He has also co-authored a book of some of his songs with the journalist Lyn Ebenezer:

- I Adrodd yr Hanes: 51 O Ganeuon Meic Stevens Gyda Cherddoriaeth, Meic Stevens a Lyn Ebenezer, 1993, Gwasg Carreg Gwalch, ISBN 9780863812736
