= Song of the Earth =

1969 novel by Alexander Cordell

- First edition (publ. Gollancz)
- Author: Alexander Cordell
- Language: English
- Publisher: Gollancz
- Publication date: 1969
- ISBN: 0-575-00275-1 (first edition)
- Dewey Decimal: 823.914
- LC Class: PZ4.C794 So

Song of the Earth is a novel by Alexander Cordell, first published in 1969. It is the final book of Cordell's "Mortymer Trilogy".

The novel is Cordell's third book in the lives of the Mortymer family, after Rape of the Fair Country and Hosts of Rebecca. It tells of the Evan family buying a canal barge on the Neath valley canal. There they meet Mari Mortymer and her adopted daughter Rhiannon. It tells of the coal industry in Resolven as well as the Brunel designed Canal system of the valley. It describes the landscape of the area (still viewable today over 150 years later) as well as the hardship suffered by the family, and growth of disease and population topography in the industrial revolution.

Cordell's third book in the lives of Mortymer family switches its focus to the canals and waterways of South Wales, especially the Neath Valley. The narrator is Bryn Evan, son of Mostyn and he describes how he, his Father and the Evan family take delivery of a new barge as owner/operators. They struggle to maintain a working existence against the onslaught of the new railways then under construction and being forged by the inspired engineering skills of Isambard Kingdom Brunel which are penetrating the valleys of South Wales. Against this backdrop, Mostyn marries Marie Mortymer who also appears in 'Rape of the Fair Country' and 'The Hosts of Rebecca'.

Time passes and the family have to accept the inevitable that the canals are failing, so they move to Aberdare to work in the pits and experience the grinding poverty and the everyday struggle of the Miners working the coalfields of the middle period of the 19th. Century.
