= Alexander Cordell =

Welsh writer (1914–1997)

- Born: George Alexander Graber; 9 September 1914; Colombo, Ceylon
- Died: c. 9 July 1997 (aged 82); Denbighshire, Wales
- Occupation: author
- Spouse(s): Rosina (nee Wells); Elsie May (nee Donovan)
- Writing career
- Genre: Novels
- Subject: Historic Wales
- Notable work: Rape of the Fair Country

Alexander Cordell (9 September 1914 – c. 9 July 1997) was the pen name of George Alexander Graber. He was a prolific Welsh novelist and author of 30 acclaimed works which include, Rape of the Fair Country, Hosts of Rebecca and Song of the Earth.

== Personal history ==
Cordell was born in Ceylon in 1914 to an English family. He was educated mainly in China and joined the British Army at age 18 in 1932. A major in the Royal Artillery, he retired from the British Army to civilian life as a quantity surveyor for the War Office and moved to Abergavenny with his wife Rosina and daughter, Georgina. It was from here that his obvious love for Wales began to grow; in later life he referred in his writings to his mother being from the Rhondda.

Cordell left Wales for spells in Hong Kong and the Isle of Man. Yet he kept coming back to Wales. He settled at various times in Abergavenny, Chepstow, Milford Haven and Wrexham.

At the time of his death, Cordell lived on Railway Road in Stansty near Wrexham. He collapsed and died while walking near the Horseshoe Pass in Denbighshire. He died of natural causes. He is buried at Llanfoist near Abergavenny. The Cordell Country Inn, formerly The Royal oak , above Govilon, between Blaenavon and Abergavenny was renamed after him. It has now become a private house and is not open to the public.

== Writing career ==
Some of his most famous works— Rape of the Fair Country (1959), Hosts of Rebecca (1960) and Song of the Earth (1969)—form the first part of the "Mortymer Saga", and are part of a series of Cordell novels that portray the turbulent history of early industrial Wales. Faithful to historical fact, he presents events like the birth of trade unionism and rise of the Chartist movement and the Newport Rising.

The Mortymer Saga is the story of the Mortymer family, commencing in 1826, and tells of the trials of several generations of the family, set against the background of the coal mining and iron industries. In 1985, at the suggestion of a fellow South Wales author, Chris Barber, Cordell wrote a prelude to the original trilogy, This Proud and Savage Land, which starts in 1800 and tells the story of 16-year-old Hywel Mortymer, who comes from rural Mid-Wales to work in the coal mines and ironworks of the industrial South Wales valleys, owned by early ironmasters and coalowners. It ends with the birth of his son Iestyn, with which the next book commences. Cordell continued the Mortymer Saga into the 1990s with yet another trilogy, starting with Beloved Exile (1992), then followed with Land of Heart's Desire (1994) and The Love that God Forgot (1995) which concludes the story of the Mortymers at the turn of the century in 1900.

In 1963 he published The Race of the Tiger, a novel about the O'Haras, an Irish clan who in the mid-19th century emigrate to Pittsburgh, Pennsylvania, United States, to work in the booming iron and steel industry.

In 1970 Cordell published his first book for younger readers, The White Cockade, about the Irish rebellion of 1798. He later published Witches' Sabbath and The Healing Blade which became the John Regan Trilogy.

In 1972, Cordell began what is referred to by his readers as his second Welsh trilogy. This began with The Fire People, set in Merthyr Tydfil against the background of the 1831 Merthyr Rising, for which Cordell did considerable research. An appendix to the book presents evidence suggesting that Richard Lewis, known as Dic Penderyn, may have been unjustly condemned to be hanged, for which he has become known as the first Welsh working-class martyr. The trilogy continued with Cordell's 1977 work, This Sweet and Bitter Earth, describing the slate quarries of North Wales in 1900, and later the Rhondda Valley coal mining industry, as seen through the eyes of Toby Davis. This second trilogy concluded in 1983 with Land of My Fathers which deals with both copper mining on the island of Anglesey and the iron foundries of Dowlais between 1838 and 1861 through the eyes of the character of Taliesin Roberts.

== Selected works ==
Novels

- A Thought of Honour (1954)
- The Enemy Within (1957)
- Rape of the Fair Country (1959)
- Hosts of Rebecca (1960)
- Robe of Honour (1960)
- The Race of the Tiger (1963)
- The Sinews of Love (1965)
- The Deadly Eurasian (1967)
- Song of the Earth (1969)
- The White Cockade (1970)
- Witches' Sabbath (1970)
- The Healing Blade (1971)
- Traitor Within (1971)
- The Fire People (1972)
- If You Believe the Soldiers (1973)
- The Dream and the Destiny (1975)
- This Sweet and Bitter Earth (1977)
- Sea Urchin (1979)
- To Slay the Dreamer (1980)
- Rogue's March (1981)
- Land of My Fathers (1983)
- Peerless Jim (1984)
- Tunnel Tigers (1986)
- Tales from Tiger Bay (1986)
- This Proud and Savage Land (1987)
- Requiem for a Patriot (1988)
- Moll (1990)
- Beloved Exile (1993)
- The Dreams of Fair Women (1993)
- Land of Heart's Desire (1994)
- The Love That God Forgot (1995)
- Sweet and Bitter Earth (1996)
- Send Her Victorious (1997)
