= Thomas Rees (Twm Carnabwth) =

Welsh leader of the first "Rebecca Riots" in 1839

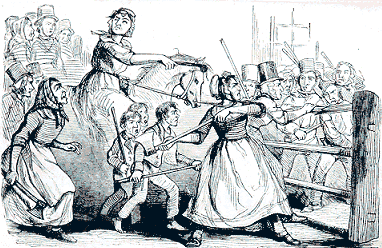
Depiction of the Rebecca Riots, Illustrated London News 1843

Thomas Rees (c. 1806 - 17 November 1876), generally known as Twm Carnabwth, was a leader of the first "Rebecca Riots" in 1839.

Nobody knows who called the meeting in the barn of Glynsaithmaen farm in the Preseli hills, and nobody knows who attended. But the man selected to lead the attack on the new toll-gate at Efail-wen was the 33-year-old red-headed Thomas Rees.
