= Evan Evans (minister) =

Welsh minister (1804–1886)

Evan Evans (1804–1886), generally known in Wales as Evans Bach Nantyglo, was a Welsh dissenting minister.

Evans was born at Gellillyndy, Llanddewi Brefi, Cardiganshire, on 8 March 1804. He commenced preaching with the Calvinistic Methodists in 1825; became a total abstainer in 1830, and met with much persecution for his advocacy of temperance principles, which were new in those days. In 1847 he joined the independents, and continued a popular minister among them through life. In 1869, he was induced to emigrate to America, whither a daughter and several brothers and sisters had gone before him, taking up his residence at Oak Hill, Ohio. In 1881, he established a small Welsh church in Arkansas, the first in the state, and continued in charge of it until his death on 29 October 1886. His wife died in January of the same year.

He was the father of Beriah Gwynfe Evans.

== Works ==
His literary works are: ‘Rhodd Mam i'w Phlentyn;’ he edited the monthly magazine called ‘Cyfaill Plentyn;’ ‘y Cyfamod Gweithredoedd,’ &c., 2nd edit., 1842; ‘Cofiant Parch. D. Stephenson, Brynmawr;’ ‘Ffordd Duw yn y Cyssegr a'r Mor;’ ‘Athrawiaeth a Dyledswydd,’ being two volumes of sermons, 1864 and 1866; he translated ‘Daioni a Thoster Duw,’ by John Owen, D.D., 1843; ‘Corff Duwinyddiaeth,’ by Dr. Brown of Haddington, 1845; ‘Cynydd y Cristion,’ by Dr. Goodwin, 1847; ‘Codiad a Chwymp Pabyddiaeth,’ by Dr. Fleming, 1849; ‘Crefydd Gymdeithasol,’ by Matthias Maurice, 1862; he also published ‘Ystafell Weddi, neu Allwedd Ddirgel y Nefoedd,’ by Brooks, translated by Rev. W. Williams, Talgarth, 1845.
