= Celtic rock =

Subgenre of rock influenced by Celtic folk music

- Stylistic origins: Irish folk music; rock music; folk rock; Scottish folk music; Welsh folk music; Celtic music
- Cultural origins: 1960s, Celtic nations

Fusion genres
- Celtic punk; Celtic metal

Other topics
- Celtic fusion

Celtic rock is a genre of folk rock, as well as a form of Celtic fusion which incorporates Celtic music, instrumentation and themes into a rock music context. It has been prolific since the early 1970s and can be seen as a key foundation of the development of successful mainstream Celtic bands and popular musical performers, as well as creating important derivatives through further fusions. It has played a major role in the maintenance and definition of regional and national identities and in fostering a pan-Celtic culture. It has also helped to communicate those cultures to external audiences.

== Definition ==
The style of music is the hybrid of traditional Irish, Scottish Gaelic, Welsh and Breton musical forms with rock music. This has been achieved by the playing of traditional music, particularly ballads, jigs and reels with rock instrumentation; by the addition of traditional Celtic instruments, including the Celtic harp, tin whistle, uilleann pipes (or Irish bagpipes), fiddle, bodhrán, accordion, concertina, melodeon, and bagpipes (highland) to conventional rock formats; by the use of lyrics in Celtic languages and by the use of traditional rhythms and cadences in otherwise conventional rock music. Just as the validity of the term Celtic in general and as a musical label is disputed, the term Celtic rock cannot be taken to mean there was a unified Celtic musical culture between the Celtic nations. However, the term has remained useful as a means of describing the spread, adaptation and further development of the musical form in different but related contexts.

== History ==
=== Ireland ===
By the end of the 1960s Ireland already had a flourishing folk music tradition and a growing blues and pop scene, which provided a basis for Irish rock. Perhaps the most successful product of this scene was the band Thin Lizzy. Formed in 1969 their first two albums were recognisably influenced by traditional Irish music and their first hit single "Whisky in the Jar" in 1972, was a rock version of a traditional Irish song. From this point they began to move towards the hard rock that allowed them to gain a series of hit singles and albums, but retained some occasional elements of Celtic rock on later albums such as Jailbreak (1976).

Formed in 1970, Horslips were the first Irish group to have the terms 'Celtic rock' applied to them, and produced work that included traditional Irish/Celtic music and instrumentation, Celtic themes and imagery, and concept albums based on Irish mythology in a way that entered the territory of progressive rock all powered by a hard rock sound. Horslips are considered important in the history of Irish rock as they were the first major band to enjoy success without having to leave their native country and can be seen as providing a template for Celtic rock in Ireland and elsewhere. These developments ran in parallel with the burgeoning folk revival in Ireland that included groups such as Planxty and the Bothy Band. It was from this tradition that Clannad, whose first album was released in 1973, adopted electric instruments and a more 'new age' sound at the beginning of the 1980s. Moving Hearts, formed in 1981 by former Planxty members Christy Moore and Donal Lunny, followed the pattern set by Horslips in combining Irish traditional music with rock, and also added elements of jazz to their sound.

=== Scotland ===
There has long been strong links between Irish and Scottish music. The adoption of folk rock produced groups including the JSD Band and Spencer's Feat. Out of the wreckage of the latter in 1974, was formed probably the most successful band in this genre, combining Irish and Scottish personnel to form Five Hand Reel. Two of the most successful groups of the 1980s emerged from the dance band circuit in Scotland. From 1978, when they began to release original albums, Runrig produced highly polished Scottish folk rock, including the first commercially successful album with the all Gaelic Play Gaelic in 1978. From the 1980s, Capercaillie combined Scottish folk music, electric instruments and haunting vocals to considerable success. Scottish Band the Waterboys became a well known Celtic rock band during the 1980s with the release of albums such as This Is the Sea and Fisherman's Blues. They also incorporated folk elements into their music. One of Scotland's most commercially successful and fondly-remembered rock acts, Big Country, also incorporated the influence of traditional Scottish music into their songs. While bagpipes had become an essential element in Scottish folk bands, they were much rarer in folk rock outfits, but were successfully integrated into their sound by Wolfstone from 1989, who focused on a combination of highland music and rock.

=== Brittany ===
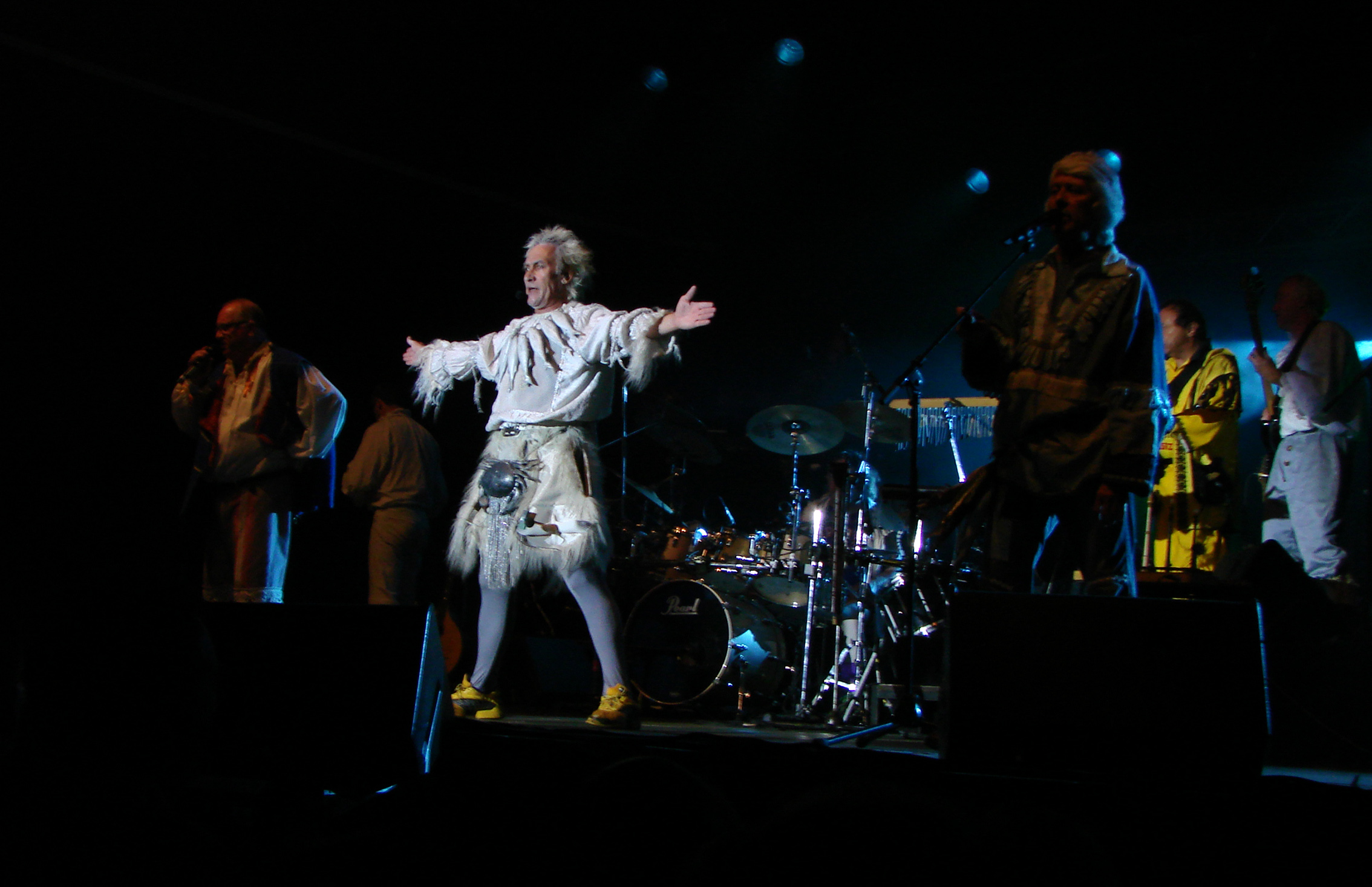
Tri Yann became famous throughout France for their medieval inspired Celtic rock, drawing on traditional Breton folk ballads.

Brittany also made a major contribution to Celtic rock. The Breton cultural revival of the 1960s was exemplified by Alan Stivell who became the leading proponent of the Breton harp and other instruments from about 1960, he then adopted elements of Irish, Welsh and Scottish traditional music in an attempt to create a pan-Celtic folk music, which had considerable impact elsewhere, particularly in Wales and Cornwall. From 1972 he began to play folk rock with a band including guitarists Dan Ar Braz and Gabriel Yacoub. Yacoub went on to form Malicorne in 1974 one of the most successful folk rock bands in France. After an extensive career that included a stint playing as part of Fairport Convention in 1976, Ar Braz formed the pan-Celtic band Heritage des Celtes, who managed to achieve mainstream success in France in the 1990s. Probably the best known and most enduring folk rock band in France were Tri Yann formed in 1971 and still recording and performing today.

=== Wales ===
While Welsh folk music developed as a distinctive part of a pan-Celtic movement, early Welsh pop and rock music was more influenced by American and English artists than traditional or Celtic acts. By the end of the 1960s the Welsh rock scene included a number of internationally successful English language groups that included Badfinger, Amen Corner, Elastic Band, Budgie and Man.

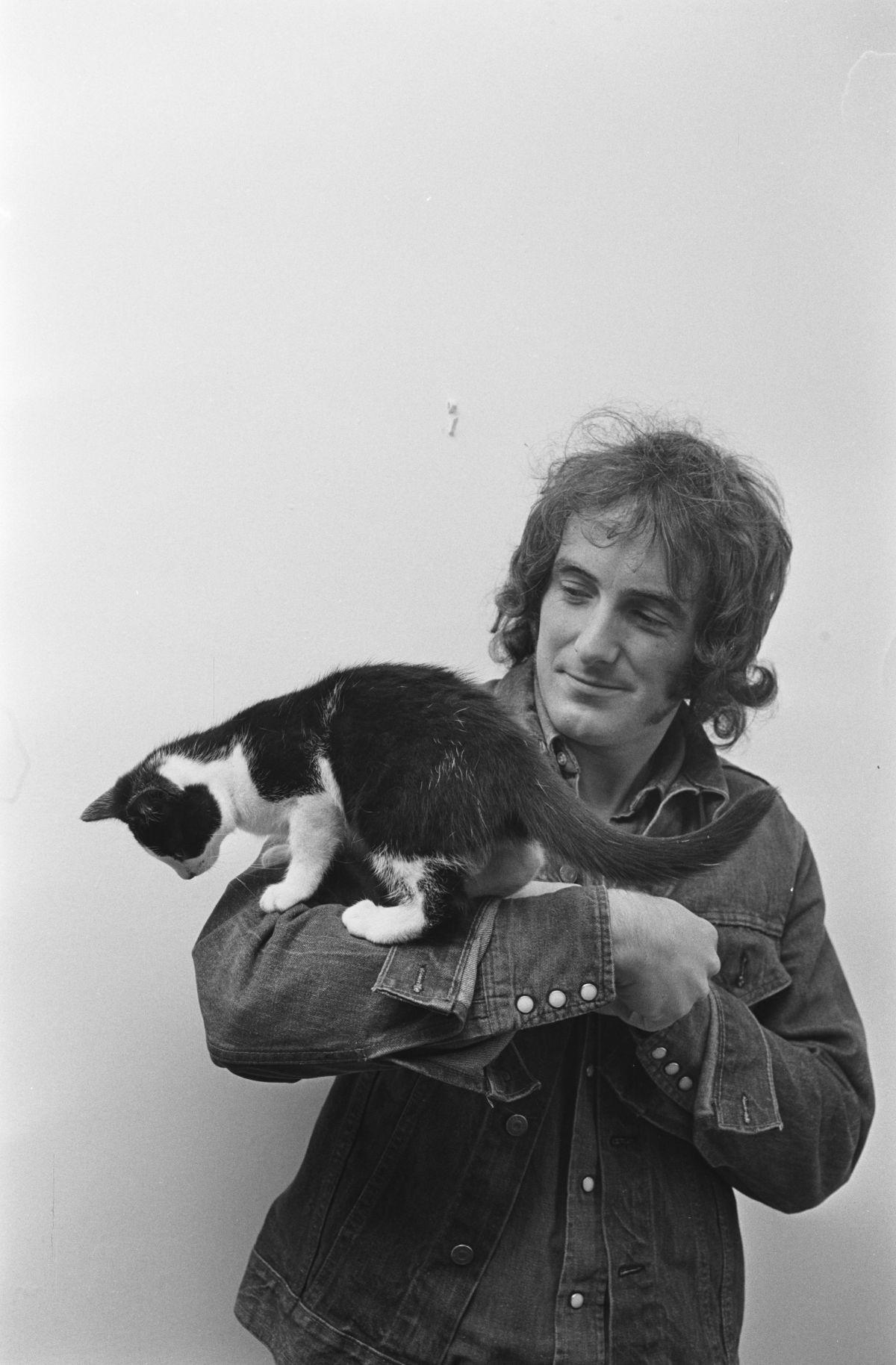
Dewi Pws caused a sensation in Welsh traditional music by "going electric" with his band Edward H. Dafis

The Welsh rock scene would change markedly from October 1969, when the Sain record label released its first single. Founded as a label for both rock and folk musicians in the Welsh-language, and home to artists such as Dafydd Iwan, Meic Stevens and Ar Log, Sain would become Wales' biggest record label. With Sains success as both a folk and rock label, more and more folk musicians transitioned into rock music in the early 1970s, meaning that traditional Celtic element within Welsh folk music now became evident within the burgeoning Welsh language rock scene. Acts such as Edward H. Dafis caused a sensation by "going electric" and using rock instrumentation. This new rock scene soon became associated with Welsh nationalism, political activism and the campaign for the Welsh language.

The late 1970s also saw a backlash against Celtic rock in Wales, with many Welsh language acts such as Sains own Geraint Jarman finding success. Jarman began experimenting with more contemporary and global musical forms (such as reggae), combining them with lyrics that still conformed to the traditional techniques of ancient Welsh poetry. As such, the 1980s Welsh rock scene was split between three distinct genres, dominated by post-punk acts who consciously moved away from Celtic Rock such as Jarman and Datblygu, the new punk-folk Celtic Rock bands such as Bob Delyn a'r Ebillion and those who favoured the pre-punk music of the 1960s and 1970s. Jarman himself would later be credited by the musician Gruff Rhys with "severing ties with Celtic folk and serving as a bridge to a new wave of post-punk".

Yma o Hyd performed by Dafydd Iwan and Ar Log

Despite this, Celtic rock firmly transitioned into the Welsh mainstream throughout the 1980s, becoming the centre of Welsh language popular culture. Globally, acts such as Ar Log also embarked on world tours, bringing new renditions of "traditional Welsh folk music, haunting love songs, harp airs, melodic dance tunes and rousing sea shanties" to new markets. Dafydd Iwan's 1983 song "Yma o Hyd" would become his biggest cross-over success, with a 2022 poll found that 35% of the people of Wales knew at least some of the song's lyrics.

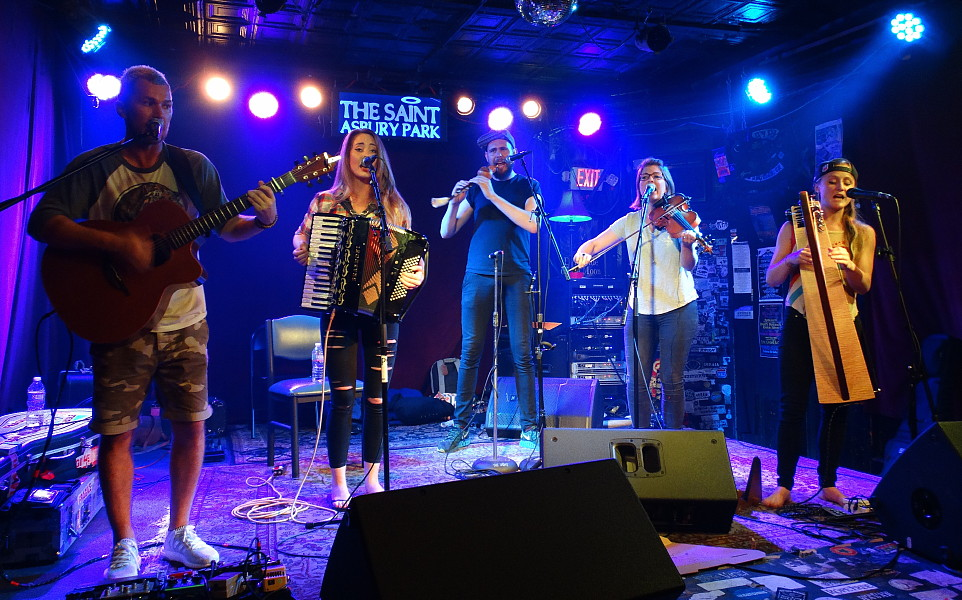
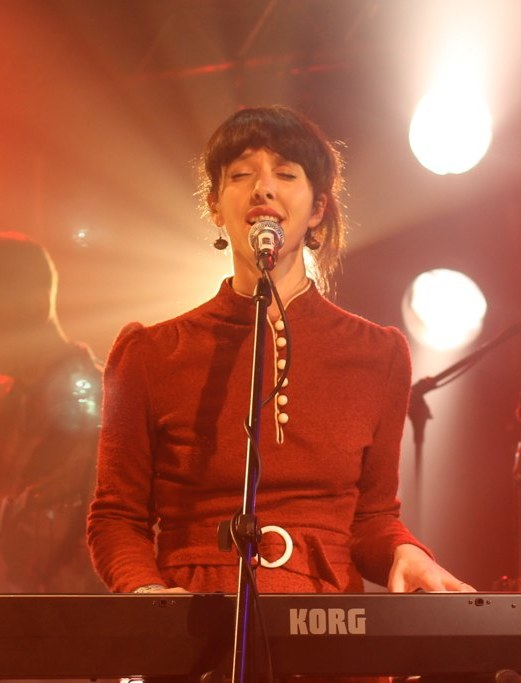
Welsh Celtic Rock acts Calan (left) and Lisa Jên of the band 9Bach (right).

While the 1990s saw the creation of the Fflach:tradd label and an increase in recognisably Celtic rock acts like the Bluehorses, Welsh music was defined by the return of internationally successful rock bands that marked the "Cool Cymru" era, such as the Manic Street Preachers, Stereophonics, Super Furry Animals and Catatonia.

The early twenty-first century saw another revival for Welsh Celtic Rock, led by Calan, 9Bach and Bwncath who continue to find success within the Celtic rock genre.

=== Cornwall and the Isle of Man ===
Whereas other Celtic nations already had existing folk music cultures before the end of the 1960s, this was less true in Cornwall and the Isle of Man, which were also relatively small in population and more integrated into English culture and (in the case of Cornwall) the British State. As a result, there was relatively little impact from the initial wave of folk electrification in the 1970s. However, the pan-Celtic movement, with its musical and cultural festivals helped foster some reflections in Cornwall where a few bands from the 1980s onwards utilised the traditions of Cornish music with rock, including Moondragon and its successor Lordryk. More recently the bands Sacred Turf, Skwardya and Krena, have been performing in the Cornish language.

=== Celtic Diaspora ===
One by-product of the Celtic Diaspora was the existence of large communities across the world that looked for their cultural roots and identity to their origins in the Celtic nations. While it seems young musicians from these communities usually chose between their folk culture and mainstream forms of music such as rock or pop, after the advent of Celtic punk relatively large numbers of bands began to emerge styling themselves as Celtic rock. This is particularly noticeable in the US and Canada, where there are large communities descended from Irish and Scottish immigrants. From the United States this includes the Irish bands Flogging Molly, the Tossers, Dropkick Murphys, the Young Dubliners, LeperKhanz, Black 47, the Killdares, the Drovers and Jackdaw, and for Scottish bands Prydein, Seven Nations and Flatfoot 56. From Canada are bands like the Mahones, Enter the Haggis, Great Big Sea, the Real Mckenzies and Spirit of the West. These groups were naturally influenced by American forms of music, some containing members with no Celtic ancestry and commonly singing in English. A band in England is the BibleCode Sundays.

== Subgenres ==
=== Celtic punk ===
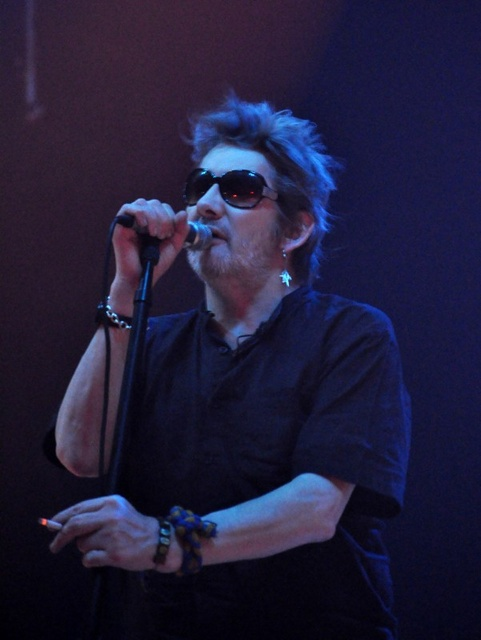
Celtic Punk was pioneered by singer-songwriters such as Shane MacGowan of The Pogues

Ireland proved a particularly fertile ground for punk bands in the mid-1970s, including Stiff Little Fingers, the Undertones, the Radiators from Space, the Boomtown Rats and the Virgin Prunes. Scotland also produced its fair share with acts including the Skids and the Rezillos. As with folk rock in England, the advent of punk and other musical trends undermined the folk element of Celtic rock, but in the early 1980s London based Irish band the Pogues created the subgenre Celtic punk by combining structural elements of folk music with a punk attitude and delivery. The Pogues' style of punked-up Irish music spawned and influenced a number of Celtic punk bands, including fellow London-Irish band Neck, Nyah Fearties from Scotland, Australia's Roaring Jack and Norway's Greenland Whalefishers.

=== Celtic metal ===
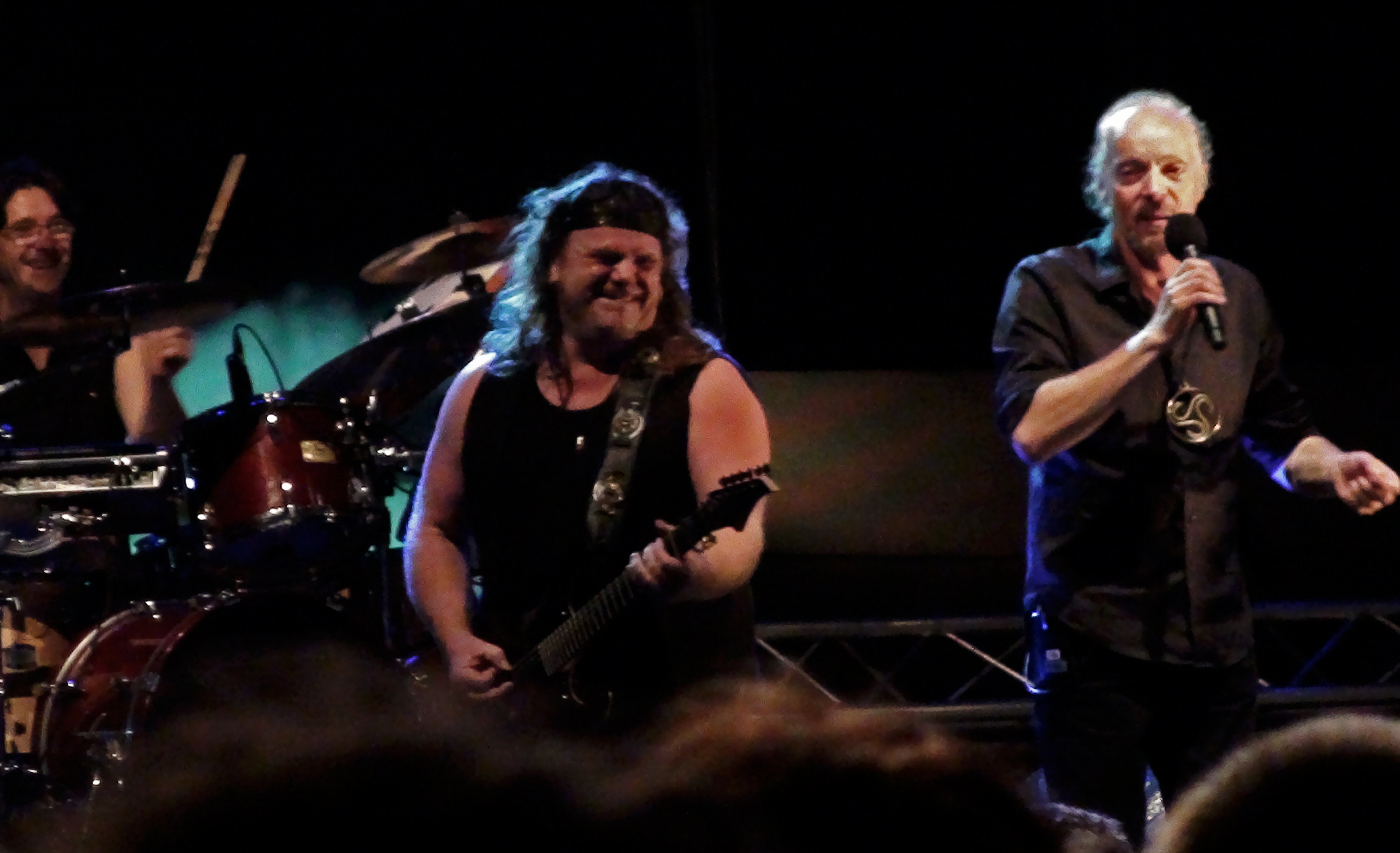
French musician Pat O'May (left) blends Heavy Metal with Celtic Music and often performs with Breton musician Alan Stivell (right).

Like Celtic rock in the 1970s, Celtic metal resulted from the application of a development in English music, when in the 1990s thrash metal band Skyclad added violins, and with them jigs and folk voicings to their music on the album The Wayward Sons of Mother Earth (1990). This inspired the Dublin based band Cruachan to mix traditional Irish music with black metal and to create the subgenre of Celtic metal. They were soon followed by bands such as Primordial and Waylander. Like Celtic punk, Celtic metal replicates the fusing of Celtic folk tradition with contemporary forms of music. A well-known representative of this style is Thanateros from Germany.

== Influence ==
Whereas in England folk rock, after initial mainstream recognition, subsided into the status of a sub-cultural soundtrack, in many Celtic communities and nations it has remained at the forefront of musical production. The initial wave of Celtic rock in Ireland, although ultimately feeding into Anglo-American dominated progressive rock and hard rock provided a basis for Irish bands that would enjoy international success, including the Pogues and U2: one making use of the tradition of Celtic music in a new context and the other eschewing it for a distinctive but mainstream sound. Similar circumstances can be seen in Scotland albeit with a delay in time while Celtic rock culture developed, before bands like Runrig could achieve international recognition. Widely acknowledged as one of the outstanding voices in Celtic rock is Brian McCombe (born in Glasgow, Scotland) of the Brian McCombe Band, a pan-Celtic group based in Brittany.

In other Celtic communities, and particularly where Celtic speakers or descendants are a minority, the function of Celtic rock has been less to create mainstream success, than to bolster cultural identity. A consequence of this has been the reinforcement of pan-Celtic culture and of particular national or regional identities between those with a shared heritage, but who are widely dispersed. However, perhaps the most significant consequence of Celtic rock has simply been as a general spur to immense musical and cultural creativity.

Celtic rock has also influenced musicians from countries and regions without Celtic communities, with some of them, like the Balkans, spawning their own Celtic rock scenes, which contributed to the interest for Celtic music and culture in local public. The pioneers of Celtic rock on the Yugoslav rock scene were the pub/garage rock band Roze Poze in the mid-1980s. In the 1990s, bands like Orthodox Celts from Serbia and Belfast Food from Croatia popularized Celtic rock further, influencing a number of younger acts, like Irish Stew of Sindidun.

== See also ==
- List of Celtic rock artists
