= David Edwards (singer) =

Welsh musician (1964–2021)

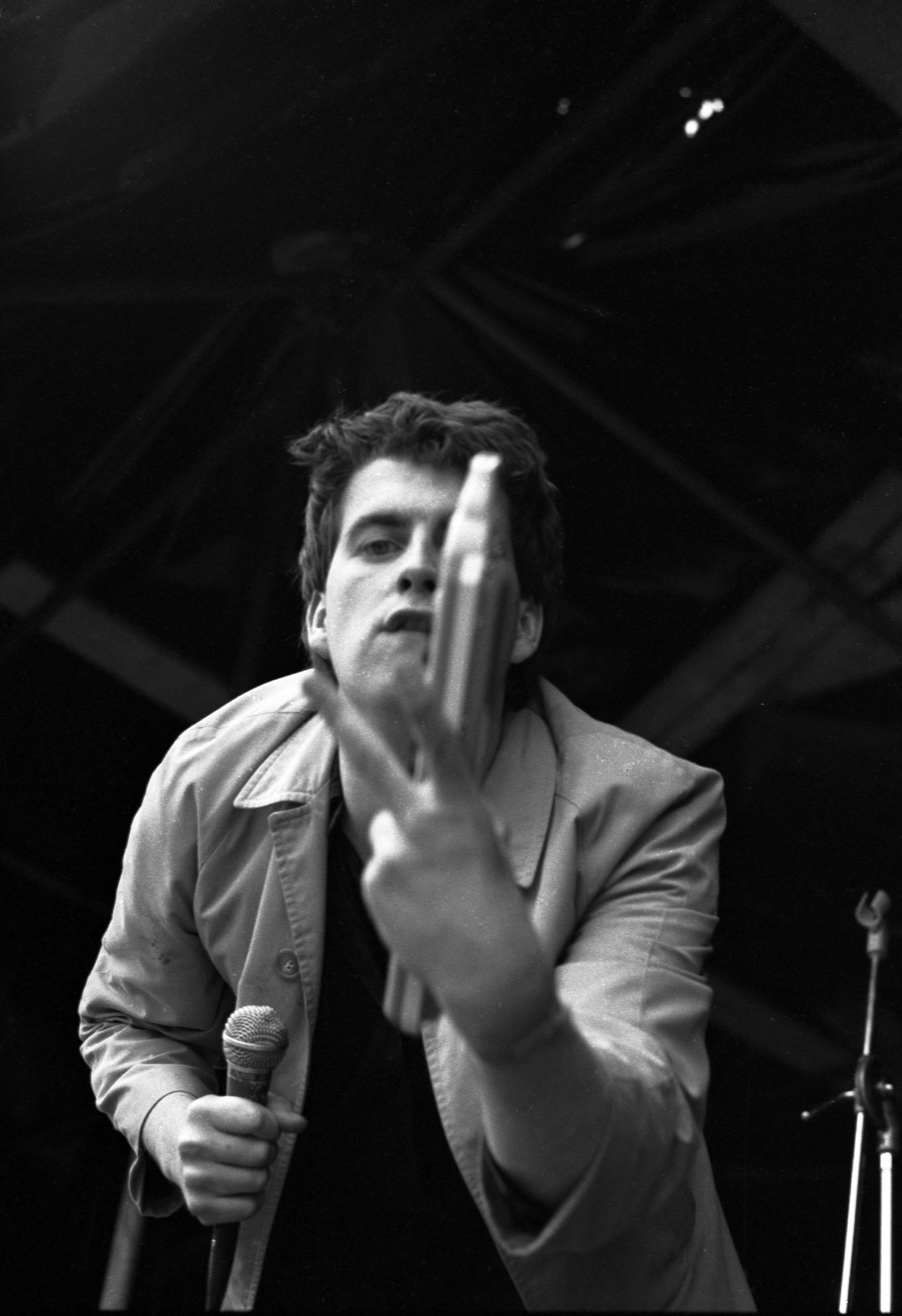
- Edwards in Bethesda, Gwynedd, 1985
- Born: David Rupert Edwards; 3 September 1964; Cardigan, Ceredigion, Wales
- Died: 20 June 2021 (aged 56); Carmarthen, Wales
- Other name: Dave Datblygu
- Occupations: Musician; singer; writer
- Years active: 1982–2021
- Known for: Being the lead singer of Datblygu

David Rupert Edwards (3 September 1964 – 20 June 2021) was a Welsh musician, singer and writer, best known as the lead singer of the Welsh language post-punk/experimental band Datblygu. NME said that "his contribution to the Welsh language can't be overestimated and his work with Datblygu serves as a focal point for its vibrant counter-culture". Additionally, John Peel said that Edwards' lyrics made him want to learn Welsh.

== Early life ==
Edwards was born in Cardigan, Ceredigion, and the band was formed at Ysgol Uwchradd Aberteifi/Cardigan Secondary School in 1982.

== Career ==
As well as Datblygu, Edwards worked with Tŷ Gwydr and pioneering electronic act Llwybr Llaethog on L.L. v T.G. MC DRE (1992), around which time he took up work as a secondary school teacher. Health problems and alcoholism forced Datblygu into retirement after releasing the Putsch double A single in 1995.

Edwards has since been largely ignored by mainstream Welsh media but interest was revived after Ankstmusik re-released 1993's classic Libertino in a triple disc box set along with the first two studio albums Wyau and Pyst in 2004. Datblygu returned to the studio in 2008 to record a one-off 7-inch single entitled "Cân y Mynach Modern".

Edwards's autobiography, Atgofion Hen Wanc, was published by Y Lolfa in 2009.

Datblygu performed occasionally during the 2010s. In 2014, the band released new material and were featured in a documentary, Prosiect Datblygu, made in 2012 and broadcast on S4C to mark the release of the new songs.

== Health and death ==
Edwards's health problems and alcoholism was chronicled in an O Flaen dy Lygaid documentary, produced by BBC Cymru for S4C. The programme also features his friend, actress Rhian Ree Davies.

On 20 June 2021, Edwards died at his home in Carmarthen at the age of 56, having had health issues for several years.
