= Welsh pop and rock music =

Overview of the popular music industry in Wales

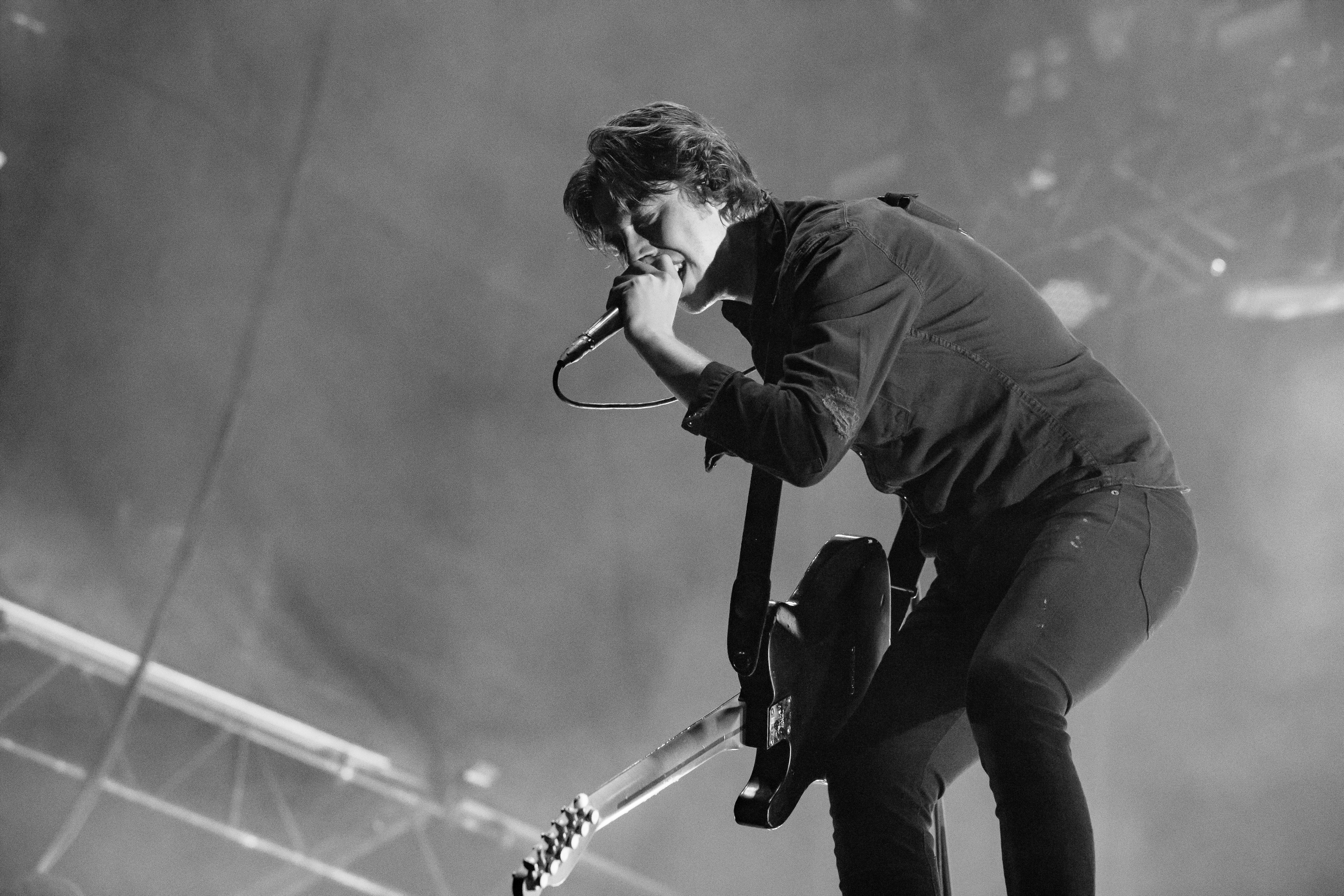
Catfish and the Bottlemen in 2019.

Welsh pop and rock music is popular music of Wales produced commercially in Wales. It emerged as a component of light entertainment shows after World War II. Welsh-language performers (for example, Dafydd Iwan) have also used the medium to discuss political themes such as Welsh Nationalism.

== History ==
=== 20th century ===
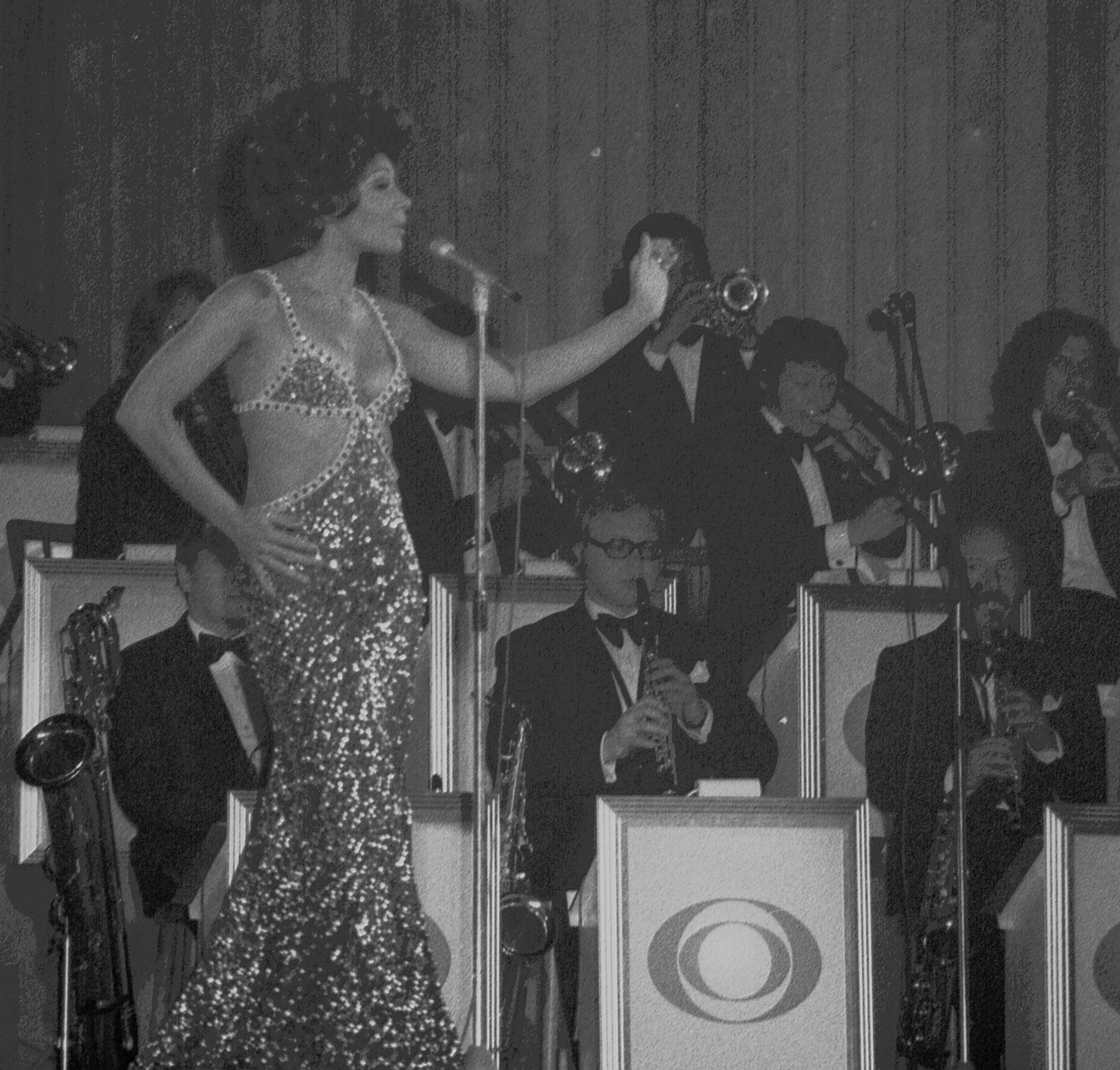
Shirley Bassey in 1973.

==== Early Welsh pop music 1945-1956 ====
Early Welsh popular music - now akin to light entertainment - first started gaining traction after the series Noson Lawen began airing on the BBC. The pilot was broadcast at the end of 1945, and provided its audience with a distraction from post-war struggles in the Welsh language. In addition to comedic segments, the melodies of popular American folk songs were often accompanied with Welsh lyrics. These were often not related to the original English lyrics, with the goal instead of providing music on light-hearted themes. Preserving the Welsh language was also a driving force behind performances, birthed out of the strong hold the Nonconformist chapel and traditional cultural festivals (Eisteddfodau) still had on popular culture, in conjunction with the growing Welsh League of Youth (Urdd Gobaith Cymru).

==== 1957-1969 ====
The 60s saw the creation of the record company Teldisc. They signed Dafydd Iwan, who was a regular performer on the commercial TV station TWW. Seeing this as an opportunity to push Iwan towards pop success, they used his segment to promote a new song each week. His 1966 song, Mae'n Wlad i Mi, an adaptation of Woody Guthrie's This Land is Your Land, has also been credited as the progenitor of the new Welsh 'folk' scene, with an emphasis on Welsh (especially Welsh-language) identity and the rejection of English control over the nation.

Tom Jones and Shirley Bassey dominated Welsh pop in the 60s. Shirley Bassey released her debut single, The Banana Boat Song in 1957, and the James Bond film theme song, Goldfinger in October 1964. In February 1965, Tom Jones released the hit single, It's Not Unusual, the start of his long career. Meic Stevens established himself in the 60s and the record label Sain was founded in 1969 in Cardiff by Dafydd Iwan and Huw Jones. The record label rapidly became the leading record company of Wales. Mary Hopkin and Badfinger also rose to prominence after being championed by Paul McCartney, and both were signed to Apple Records in 1968.

===== Popular artists =====
- Tom Jones
- Shirley Bassey
- Ricky Valance
- John Cale
- Amen Corner
- Badfinger
- Mary Hopkin
- Man
- Meic Stevens

==== 1970s ====
Tom Jones and Shirley Bassey continued their successful careers with Bassey releasing Diamonds Are Forever in 1972 and Jones releasing Daughter Of Darkness, I (Who Have Nothing), She's A Lady. Max Boyce established himself in the 70s and in 1973 he recorded the album Live At Treorchy (rugby club). Meic Stevens released his single Y Brawd Houdini, Edward H. Dafis became a popular rock group and Geraint Jarman's reggae-inspired music became popular in Wales.

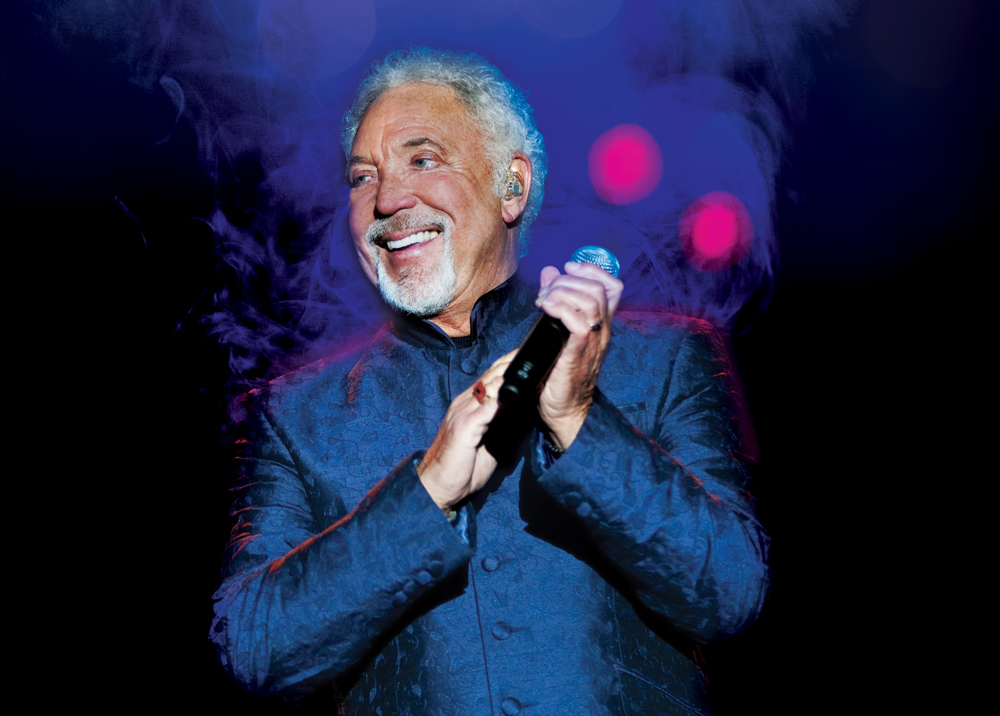
Tom Jones in 2016.

===== Popular artists =====
- Tom Jones
- Shirley Bassey
- Max Boyce
- Man
- Budgie
- Badfinger
- Meic Stevens
- John Cale
- Edward H. Dafis

==== 1980s artists ====
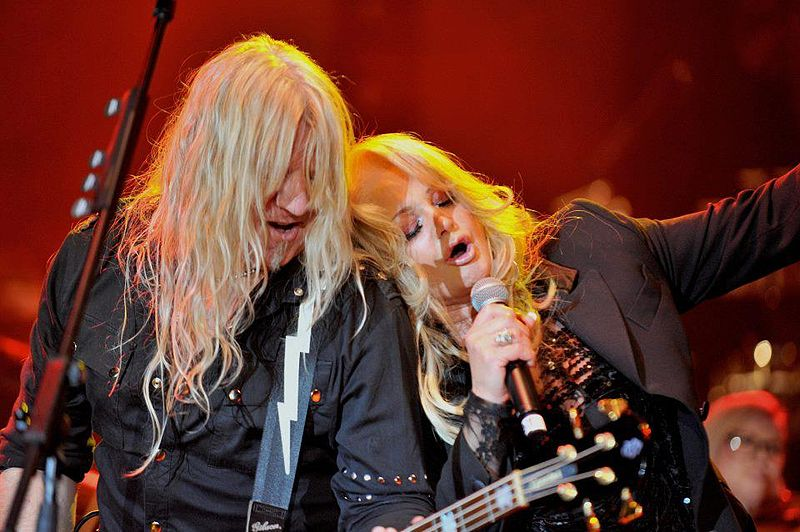
Bonnie Tyler (right) in 2013.

- Young Marble Giants
- Super Furry Animals
- Shakin' Stevens
- The Co-Stars
- Bonnie Tyler
- Yr Anhrefn
- Datblygu
- Llwybr Llaethog
- John Cale
- Tom Jones

==== 1990s artists ====
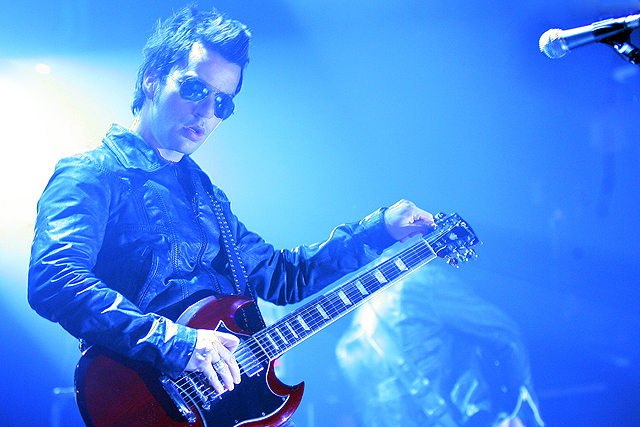
Stereophonics in 2007.

- Manic Street Preachers
- Stereophonics
- Catatonia (band)
- Super Furry Animals
- Big Leaves
- Y Cyrff
- Tom Jones

=== 21st century ===
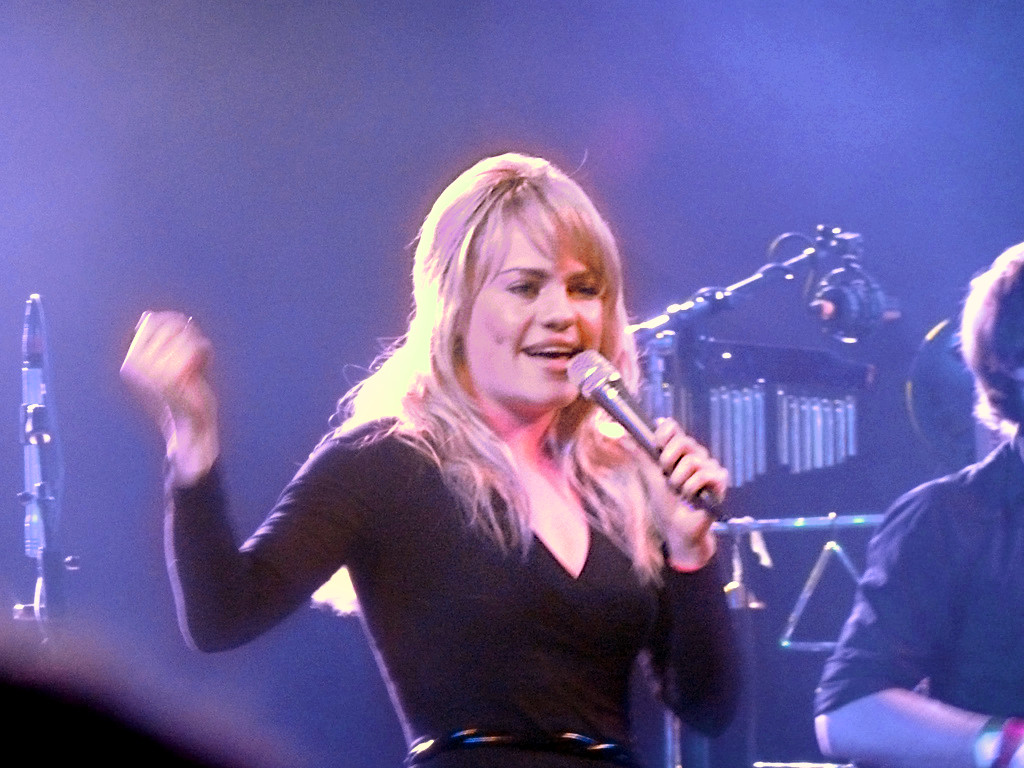
Duffy in 2008.

==== 2010s artists ====
- Lostprophets
- Funeral for a Friend
- Bullet for My Valentine
- Goldie Lookin Chain
- Duffy
- Charlotte Church
- Feeder

==== 2020s artists ====
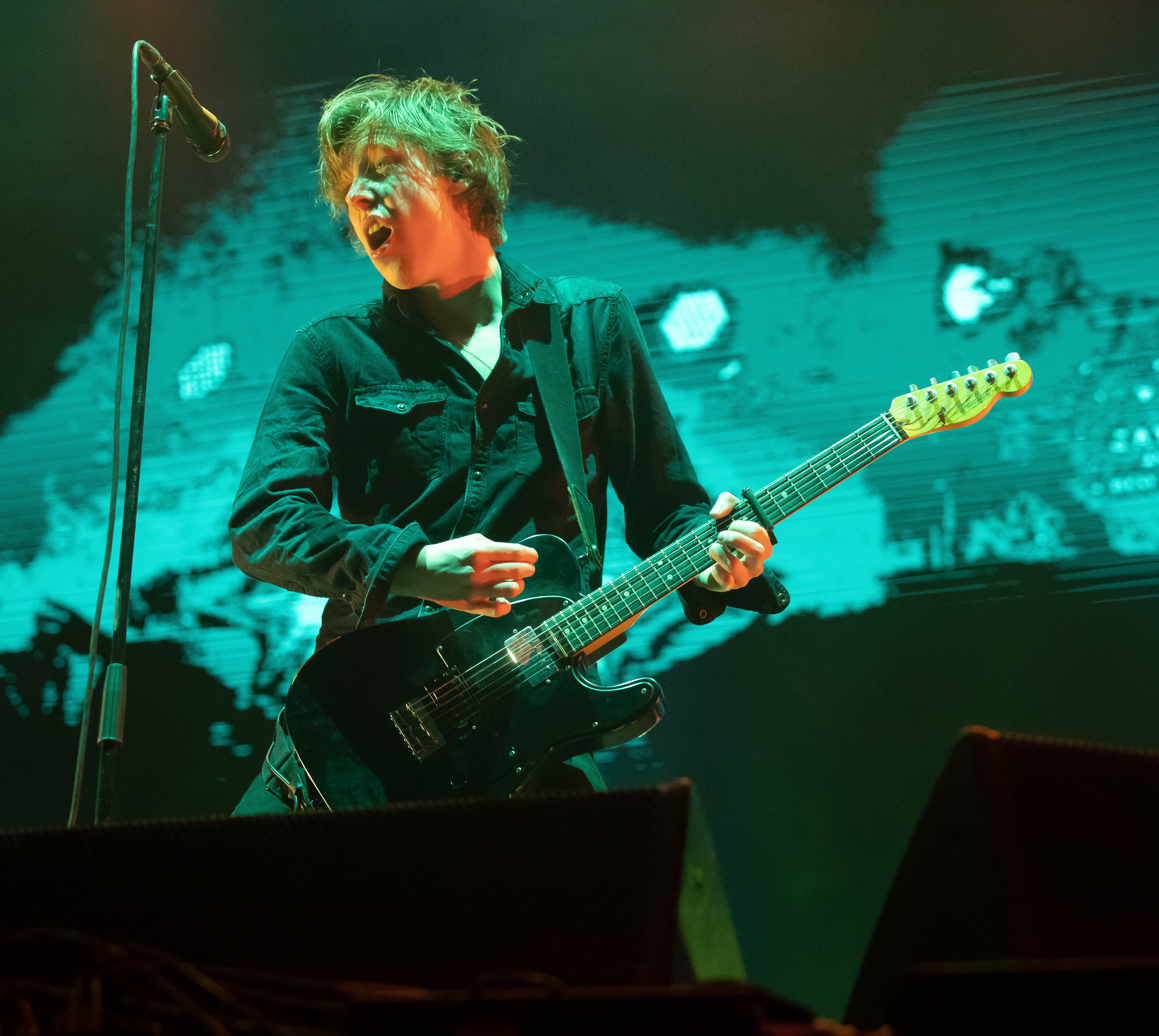
Catfish and the Bottlemen in 2019.

- Tom Jones
- Stereophonics
- Catfish and the Bottlemen
- Super Furry Animals
- Dafydd Iwan
- Candelas
- Swnami
- Yws Gwynedd

== See also ==
- Cool Cymru
- List of Welsh musicians
- Welsh Language Music Day
