= Yr Anhrefn =

Welsh punk rock group

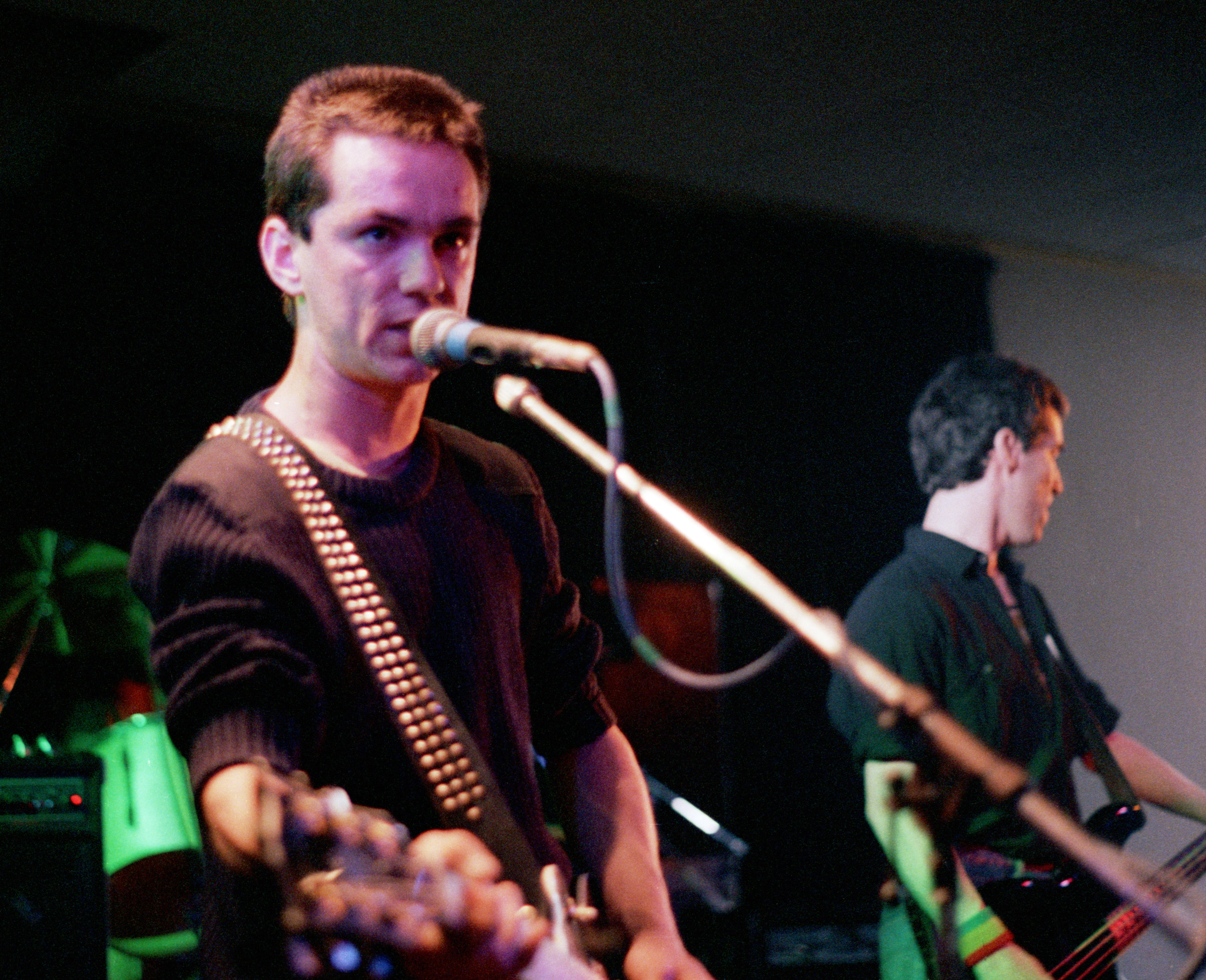

Background information
- Origin: Bangor, Wales
- Genre: Punk rock
- Years active: 1982–1995, 2007
- Labels: Anhrefn, Workers Playtime, Crai
- Past members: Rhys Mwyn; Sion Sebon; Hefin Huws; Dewi Gwyn; Dafydd Ieuan; Dylan Hughes; Sion Jones; Ryan Kift; Geraint‘Gush’ Gwyn Jones

Yr Anhrefn, also known simply as Anhrefn, were an influential Welsh punk rock group of the 1980s and 1990s.

== History ==
Anhrefn (Welsh for "Disorder") were an influential punk rock band from Bangor, North Wales and formed in 1982, and initially sang only in Welsh. The band were not supported by Radio Cymru or Welsh-language TV channel S4C, beyond an occasional interview, and bassist Rhys Mwyn became known as an outspoken critic of the Welsh pop industry.

Mwyn (born Gwynedd Rhys Thomas) set up his own Recordiau Anhrefn label in 1983, helping to promote like-minded Welsh bands as well as their own music. The band were championed by John Peel and recorded three sessions for his BBC Radio 1 show; Peel even travelled to Wales to see the band perform. The band played up to 300 gigs a year at their peak, touring Europe several times, including Czechoslovakia, Germany and the Basque Region of Spain.

They were featured on Channel 4 TV show The Tube in 1987, although they were largely ignored by the British music weeklies, and played with Joe Strummer on the Rock Against Rich UK tour in 1988.

Original members Hefin Huws and Dewi Gwyn left the band in the late 1980s and were replaced by Dylan Hughes (formerly of Y Cyrff) and Sion Jones (formerly of Maffia Mr Huws).

The band made their first English language recording in 1994, on a single with actress Margi Clarke (they released a cover of Cole Porter's "Anything Goes" as a single), and had earlier collaborated with Pauline Murray (of the punk band Penetration) in 1990, who co-wrote Llygad wrth Lygad, which is on the B-side of the cassette version of Rhedeg i Paris.

In 1995, brothers Rhys and Sion changed musical direction to a more techno sound. They changed their name and released a self-titled album Hen Wlad fy Mamau – Land of My Mothers, It also featured producer Ronnie Stone who aided the duo in creating a world beat collection of re-mixed Welsh folk music, samples and electronic sounds featuring Welsh singers Siân James, Lowri Ann Richards, June Campbell Davies and Elinor Bennett, Punjabi rapper Harvinder Sangha and African dub collective Zion Train.

The band soon split after that release, but brothers Rhys Mwyn and Sion Sebon formed a new band, Mangre, in 2000. Mwyn went on to manage the Crai label and work as an agent. He managed Catatonia and more recently Jeb Loy Nichols, which prompted a resurrection of Recordiau Anhrefn.

In 2007 Anhrefn reformed briefly without Mwyn, with Ryan Kift on vocals.

Super Furry Animals drummer Dafydd Ieuan was also in Yr Anhrefn for a time, playing on their 1993 Peel session, and SFA had started out as a techno band, supporting Yr Anhrefn on a tour of France in 1993.

Rhys Mwyn gave up his regular show on Llangefni based community radio Môn FM in 2016, to start broadcasting a regular Monday night show on BBC Radio Cymru.

In 2016, Rhys Mwyn and Sion Jones teamed up with Neil Crud and Alan Matthews (both previous members of North Wales punk bands 4Q and Sons Of Selina) to play Anhrefn's debut album Defaid, Skateboards a Wellies live under the banner Welsh Rebel Outpost. Rhys Mwyn also played bass with Welsh post-punk band White Ether (2016-2020).

In 2020 Rhys Mwyn played bass on Helen Love's single "1234 Dee Dee Ramone".

== Discography ==
=== Albums ===
- Defaid, Skateboards a Wellies (1987), Workers Playtime
- Bwrw Cwrw (1989), Workers Playtime
- Soft Lights And Loud Guitars (Part 2) (1989) Released Emotions (split LP with Last Rough Cause)
- Rhowch Eich Teitl Eich Hun (1990), – live cassette-only album, title translates as Fill in Your own Title
- Dragons Revenge (1990), Lithograph, Crai, Probe Plus
- Dial y Ddraig (1990), Incognito
- Rhedeg i Bohemia Live (1991), Pro Art
- Dave Goodman Sessions (1991), Incognito, Crai
- Hen Wlad fy Mamau – Land of My Mothers (1995), Crai

=== Singles ===
- "Dim Heddwch" / "Priodas Hapus" (1983) Anrhefn (Cat no ANRHEFN01; green vinyl)
- "Be Nesa 89" / "Bach Dy Ben " (1988) Anhrefn
- "Rhedeg i Paris" / "Y Ffordd Ymlaen" / "Llygad Wrth Lygad" (1990) Crai C008s
- Bwtleg Powerhaus Llundain 1.3.1990 (1990), Information Libre (12" EP)
- Clutter From The Gutter (1994) Incognito, Crai (with Margi Clarke on vocals)
