= Delerium Records =

British independent record label

Delerium Records was a British independent record label, that specialised in psychedelic music and which existed from 1991 to 2003, and was notable in promoting the careers of bands including Porcupine Tree, Ozric Tentacles, Kava Kava, Mandragora, Sons of Selina and Moom and for starting the Freak Emporium and Molten Records.

== Foundation ==
Founded in 1991 by Richard Allen and Ivor Trueman in Chalfont St Peter in Buckinghamshire, England, Delerium Records was originally set up to provide the free 7" records that were given away with the Freakbeat fanzine before it evolved into a label to promote new psychedelic music. The development of the label had been encouraged by Greg Shaw who Allen had come to know through the international independent record scene and a mutual interest in psychedelic culture. Allen had previously written a music column for UK Counter-culture magazine Encyclopaedia Psychedelica, briefly managed Irish American rock band The Steppes and, in 1987, had joined up with Trueman to help co-edit Freakbeat, a 3D garage and psychedelia fanzine that Trueman had founded in 1985. Trueman had previously founded the Pink Floyd fan magazine, The Amazing Pudding.

Delerium became known due to the success of British progressive rock band Porcupine Tree – whom Allen discovered and then managed up until 2004 – but Delerium also released numerous recordings by many other artists, including Ozric Tentacles, Kava Kava, Mandragora, Sons of Selina, Moom, Sadaar Bazaar, and Omnia Opera. The double CD label sampler, Pick and Mix, was one of the first budget CD samplers and sold over 15,000 copies. Other compilations included the non psychedelic CD No Compromize released in aid of the Campaign for Free Education featuring artists including Dreadzone, Zion Train, Kava Kava, Utah Saints, Eat Static, Suede, Chumbawamba and The Wedding Present.

Trueman left the music industry in 2000 and Allen carried on managing Porcupine Tree and running the Delerium label. By 2002 Delerium had become inactive as the market for new psychedelic and progressive rock bands faded, but a couple of releases were re-issued including Psychomuzak's album The Extasie (2004) – which was produced by Porcupine Tree's Steven Wilson – and Porcupine Tree's Moonloop, which was previously a fan club only album that was reissued in limited quantities on both CD and vinyl.

== Later labels ==
Allen started Molten Records in 2002 which signed up bands with a heavy psychedelic rock sound including Danish band On Trial, and UK power trio Josiah – who Allen not only christened but also managed – and related project The Beginning. Alongside Molten Allen ran a reissue label called Lightning Tree which rediscovered 1960s and 1970s recordings by Marianne Segal, Jade, Edwards Hand, The Picadilly Line and Stallion. The Lightning Tree labeul's most popular release was a collection of the original 78 rpm recordings that were covered by and inspired the Bonzo Dog Doo-Dah Band. The album Songs The Bonzos Taught Us was put together over a three-year period during which Allen tracked down all the original 78s that had influenced the band, as well as researching and notating the CD with the help of "Legs" Larry Smith of The Bonzo Dog Band. The album was referenced by Neil Innes in the sleeve notes to the 2007 EMI reissues of the Bonzo Dog Band's catalogue.

== The Freak Emporium ==
Allen and Trueman also ran The Freak Emporium, which had grown out of Freakbeat fanzine as a source of hard to find new psychedelic music. Starting out as a photocopied insert in the fanzine it went on to become one of the earliest UK music mail order operations on the internet. The success of The Freak Emporium funded the development of Delerium Records, particularly the early tours and recordings of Porcupine Tree, and by the late 1990s The Freak Emporium website and printed mail order catalogue were not just a platform for Delerium Records direct mail order, but were primarily an outlet for 30,000 specialist and hard to find items. The website featured a search engine covering over 120 genres of music as specialist as "Apocalyptic", "Experimental/Outsider Music" and "Sludge", along with many others that broke down pop and rock music from all over the world into genres named by decade and geographical location, as well as style. The Freak Emporium was reviewed and featured on BBC Radio 6 (The Freakzone), and in magazines and newspapers including The Guardian, Bizarre and Record Collector.

The Freak Emporium ceased trading in late November 2007, citing the problem of VAT free imports from the Channel Islands as the principal reason. Although no longer trading, the site remains online today as an archive and information resource for collectable and underground music. After giving evidence to the All Parliamentary Shops Committee in 2005, Allen became a pioneering tax campaigner in the era prior to the formation of UK Uncut and campaigned against retailers that were using an EU import VAT relief to obtain what he argued was a damaging and unfair advantage. He claimed that The Channel Island VAT free import fulfilment industry was devastating UK music retail and other UK retail sectors. In 2010, along with a number of retailers from various industries, Allen formed Retailers Against VAT Avoidance Schemes (RAVAS) and created a website. RAVAS successfully campaigned for the ending of the Channel Islands LVCR industry and after a landmark court hearing which took place on 13–15 March 2012 in London LVCR was no longer applicable to Channel Island mail order goods destined for the UK. The Judgement is now regarded as an important precedent clarifying the application of discretionary powers by EU member states.

Allen continues to run a campaign to end remaining LVCR abuse and, in 2013, was named one of the top 50 influential people in tax in 2012 by International tax review.

In 2006, Allen sold the Porcupine Tree catalogue to Snapper Music, and in 2010 the remainder of the Delerium and Molten catalogues were acquired by Cherry Red. Assisted by Allen a reissue programme was commenced in March 2011, with the release of a three CD boxed set retrospective entitled Last Daze of The Underground (ECLEC32245) featuring, for the first time, the full history of the Delerium label and packaging by renowned reissue designer Phil Smee. Re-releases of albums by Omnia Opera and The Aardvarks have followed since.

== See also ==
- Lists of record labels
