= Dewi "Pws" Morris =

Welsh singer, poet, actor and comedian

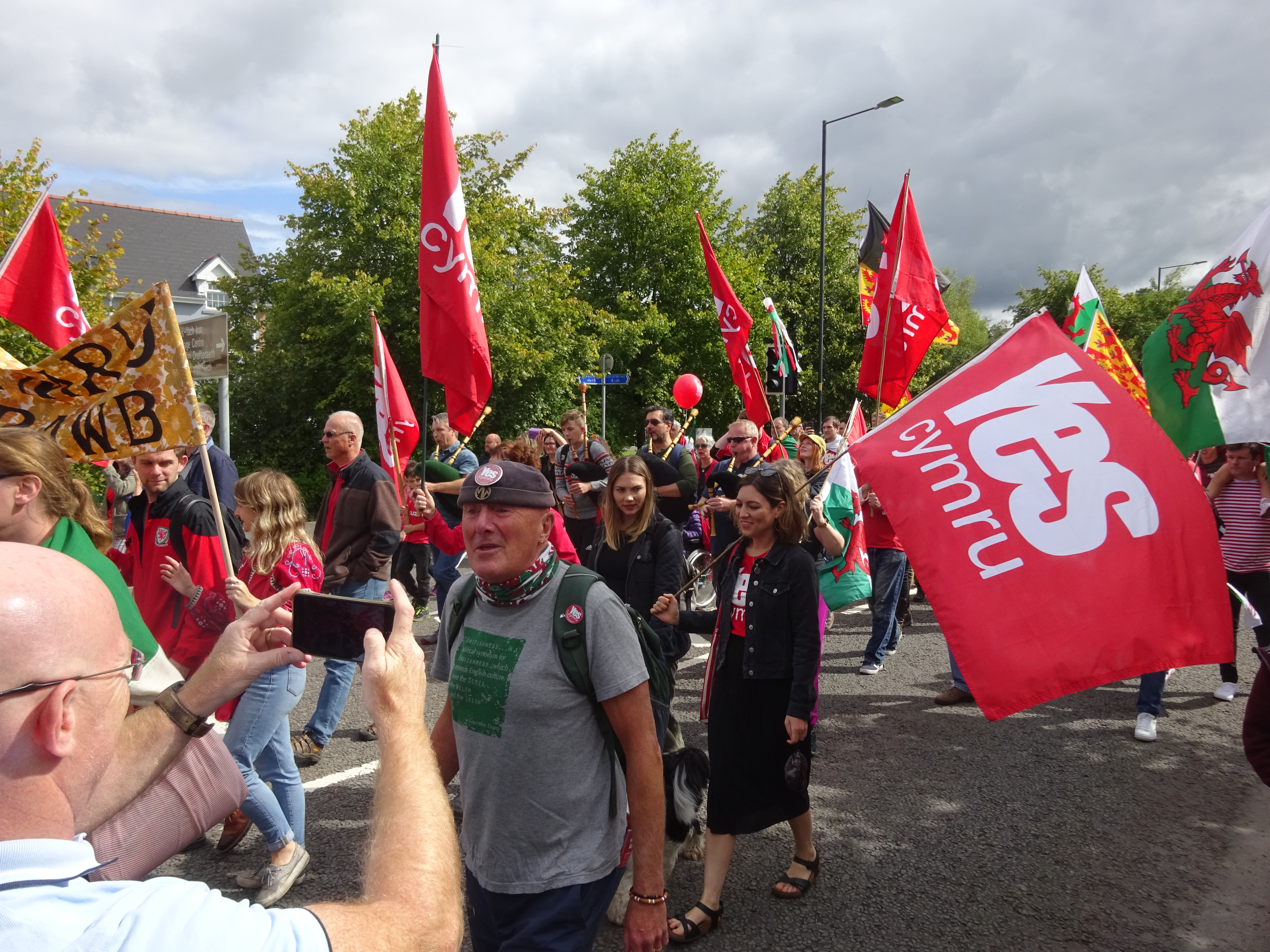
- Morris at the National March for Welsh Independence in 2019
- Born: Dewi Grey Morris; 21 April 1948; Treboeth, Swansea, Wales
- Died: 22 August 2024 (aged 76)
- Occupations: musician, poet, actor, singer, television presenter, comedian

Dewi Grey "Pws" Morris (21 April 1948 – 22 August 2024) was a Welsh musician, poet, actor, television presenter and comedian. He was known for being the lead singer of the Welsh pop band Y Tebot Piws and later for his comedy series Torri Gwynt on S4C. He held the post of Bardd Plant Cymru (Welsh-language children's poet) between 2010 and 2011.

== Early life ==
Dewi Grey Morris was born in Treboeth, Swansea. He went to Ysgol Gymraeg Lôn Las and then Dynevor School, Swansea. He first came to the attention of the whole of Wales as a member of Aelwyd yr Urdd, Morriston. Afterwards, he went to Cyncoed College in Cardiff to train as a teacher and taught for a few years at Splott, but two years later he developed his interest in the world of acting with a full-time job with Cwmni Theatr Cymru.

== Career ==
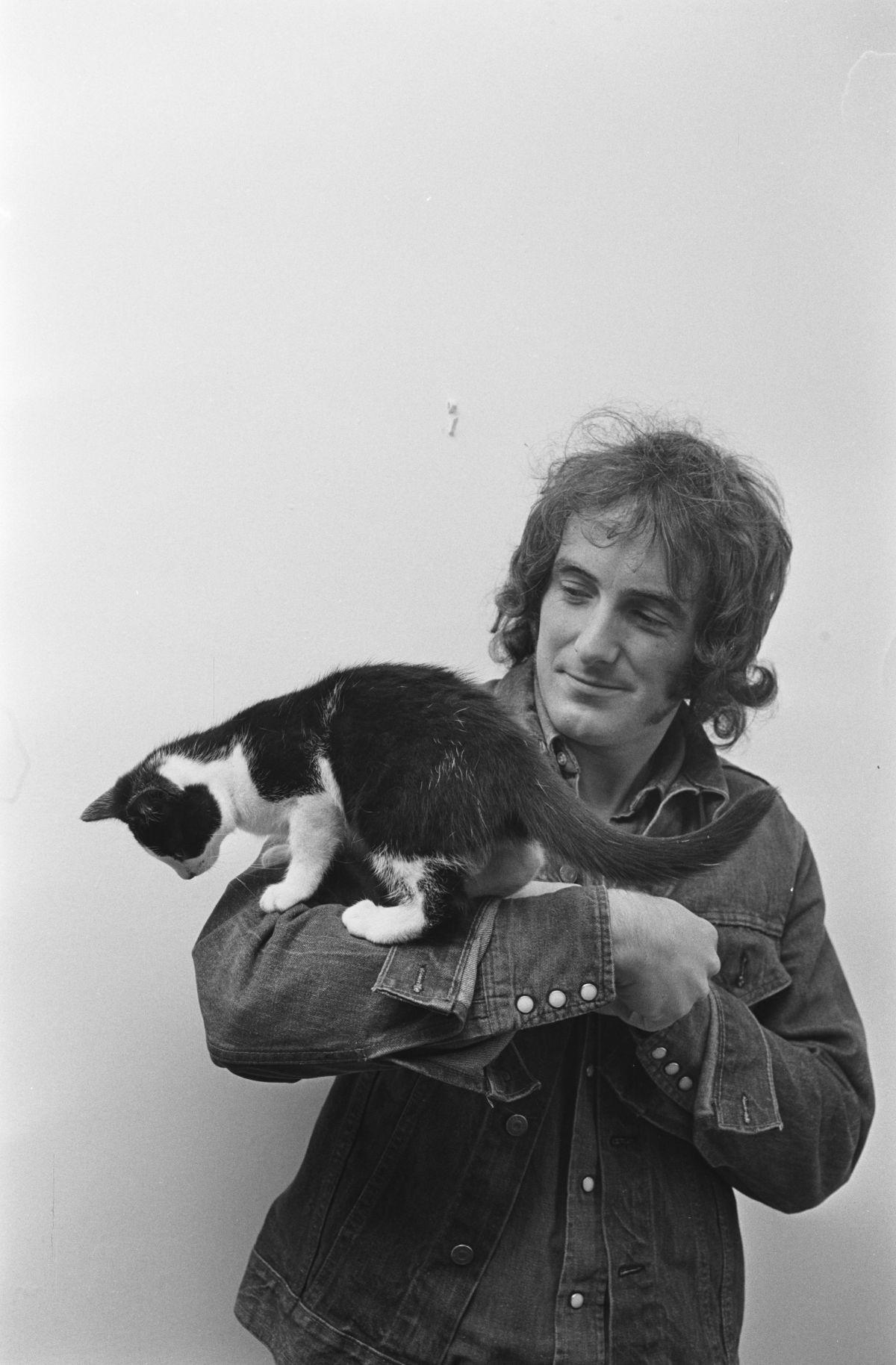
Dewi Pws in the early 1970s

=== Music ===
Morris was a member of the early Welsh-language pop band Y Tebot Piws and then the first Welsh-language supergroup Edward H. Dafis. He won the Cân i Gymru competition in 1971 with his song "Nwy yn y Nen" and composed the notable song "Lleucu Llwyd". He has played with the punk-folk band Radwm and has appeared on stage with the folk band Ar Log.

He declared to the newspaper Y Cymro in January 2010 that he would now refuse to appear on many BBC Radio Cymru programmes as they play too much English-language music. He explained that BBC Radio Wales did not play songs in Welsh, so there was no reason for the only national Welsh-language radio channel to play songs in English.

=== Acting and comedy ===
Morris played the character Wayne Harries on the S4C soap opera Pobol y Cwm from its beginning in 1974 until 1987. He had one of the main roles in the comedy film Grand Slam in 1978. In the 1970s he appeared in the children's series Miri Mawr. He also acted in the HTV soap opera Taff Acre (1981). In the 1980s he performed in and wrote the sketch comedy series Torri Gwynt. In the early 1990s he starred as the father of the family in the sitcom Hapus Dyrfa.

== Personal life ==
Morris was married to Rhiannon and lived in Tresaith, Ceredigion, before moving to Y Felinheli and then settling in Nefyn, Gwynedd. He published his autobiography, Theleri Thŵp, in 2003. In 2010 he was admitted into the Gorsedd as an honorary druid, choosing the bardic name "Dewi'n y Niwl". He received an honorary degree from Swansea University on 18 December 2018. He died after a period of illness on 22 August 2024, at the age of 76.

== Bibliography ==
- Llyfr i Blant dan Gant (Y Lolfa, 1972)
- Poster I Ti To (Y Lolfa)
- Pws! (Y Lolfa, 1986)
- with Steve Eaves, Robat Gruffudd and Robin Llwyd ab Owain, Posteri Poeth (a pack of 4 posters with a poem) (Y Lolfa, 2001)
- Teithiau Dewi Pws: Fo a Fi Gyda'i Help Hi (Gwasg Carreg Gwalch, 2004)
- Theleri Thŵp, Cyfres y Cewri 26 (Gwasg Gwynedd, 2003)
- with Rhiannon Roberts and Eric Heyman, Dewi, Dwpsi a'r Dreigiau (Gwasg Carreg Gwalch, 2007)
- Hiwmor Pws, Cyfres Ti'n Jocan (Y Lolfa, 2007)
- with Rhiannon Roberts and Eric Heyman, Dewi, Dwpsi a'r Aur (Wasg Carreg Gwalch, 2010)
- Wps! (Gomer Press, 2011)
- with Alun Gibbard, Straeon Tafarn (Y Lolfa, 2012)
- Llyfr Jôcs y LOL fa (Y Lolfa, 2013)
- with Rhiannon Roberts, Parri'r Pobydd (Gomer Press, 2013)
- Popeth Pws (Y Lolfa, 2015)

== Stories on CDs ==
- Straeon Cymru: 10 o Chwedlau Cyfarwydd (CD) (Scd2480) (Authors: Esyllt Nest Roberts and Elena Morus), December 2004 (Sain)
