= Pocket Venus =

Welsh band

- Origin: Conwy, Wales
- Genres: Post-Britpop, indie rock, alternative rock, piano rock, post-punk revival
- Years active: 1998–2003, 2010–2013
- Labels: Secrets of Sound
- Members: Chris Yates; Chris Ryan; Simon Barton; Naldo Algieri; Dave Robinson
- Past members: Chris Bainbridge; Steve Jones; Pete Ryan

Pocket Venus were a Welsh rock band from Conwy in North Wales. Their style was that of a harder-edged Britpop and they played all over the UK and received national airplay on BBC Radio 1. Pocket Venus split in 2003 during negotiations with major record labels, the band cited musical and personal differences as the reason for the break-up. In late 2010 Pocket Venus reformed.

== History ==
=== Formation (1998–2003) ===
Pocket Venus, from North Wales formed in 1998, an amalgamation of various members of earlier bands, the original line up was Chris Yates, Naldo Algieri, Steve Jones, Chris Bainbridge and Mark Kendall (formerly of Y Cyrff). The line up changed in 1999 when guitarist Chris Bainbridge left transferring rhythm guitar duties to Chris Yates. Keyboardist Dave Robinson joined shortly after but the line-up changed again in 2000 when drummer Mark Roberts left the band to be replaced by Pete Ryan. The band were managed by Neil Crud, who released two singles for them on his Secrets of Sound record label. First release; "Make It Through Your Day" had good reviews and received airplay on BBC Radio One from John Peel and Mark Radcliffe, and also airings on BBC Radio Wales from Adam Walton, who invited the band on his show for a session. The band produced a video for their second release Tell Me Why, which is still available on YouTube and the NME's official website. gigs and an energetic stage performance led to more airplay from radio stations both across the UK and internationally, notably winning "Best International Artist" at the Orange County Music Awards. The line-up changed again in late 2002 with the departure of Steve Jones on lead guitar. Jones's place was taken by Dyfed Roberts formerly of Gwacamoli. The band continued to play live shows until August 2003 when the band split up. The band had become disillusioned and disheartened by the music industry, so in order to save their friendships and personal relationships they went their separate ways.

=== Post-breakup activities (2003–2010) ===
After the band split Yates and Roberts went on to form Gotti, with Steve Flavell on drums and bass player Mauve. Gotti played locally and also recorded a number of demo tapes. Ryan, Algieri and Robinson stayed away from the music scene for various reasons and concentrated on their family lives and other responsibilities. The band attempted to reform in 2008 but never got past the rehearsal stage.

=== Reunion (2010–present) ===
In December 2010, Yates, Algieri and Robinson were joined by Chris Ryan on lead guitar and John "Hargi" Hargest on drums for a low key gig in North Wales announcing the band's return. Hargi was replaced on drums by Simon Barton early on, since then the band have played a number of gigs and have recently released a new E.P, Back to Make it Better, tracks include "Back To Make It Better", "Godspeed" and "Life Of Misery". The E.P has received national airplay and has helped the band reach a wider audience. The band are also supporting various charities including rereleasing their E.P Tell Me Why for Help For Heroes, and also playing gigs to support the Oxjam Music Festival. The band have suggested, via their Facebook page, that they intend to begin recording their debut, full-length album in 2013.

== Live ==
Pocket Venus played at many of the more infamous London venues including the Garage in Highbury, The Water Rats in St Pancras and The Bull And Gate in Kentish Town. The band played several festivals during their career playing Pigstock in North Wales and also played alongside Reef at the prestigious Wakestock festival. Pocket Venus have also played Manchester's world-renowned "In The City" showcase festival.

The band played at Club 147 in Llandudno with Talk To Angels and Danny McNamara of Embrace on Friday 2 September 2011. Later the band performed an acoustic set with Chris Helme of The Seahorses and supported Ultrasound at the launch of their new album at the Borderline Club, in Soho, and again in Llandudno on 14 December 2012.

== Discography ==
1. Make It Through Your Day EP (2000)
2. Tell Me Why EP (2002)
3. Back to Make It Better EP (2011)
