= Sons of Selina =

Psychedelic punk group from Colwyn Bay, North Wales

- Origin: Colwyn Bay and Rhyl, Wales
- Genre: Psychedelic punk
- Years active: 1990–1999
- Labels: Delerium Records, Cherry Red
- Members: Neil Crud; Steve Robins; Alan Matthews; Steven Jones; Martin Wilding
- Past members: Robin Hemuss; Ken Mainardis; Chris Bainbridge

The Sons of Selina were a psychedelic punk group formed in Colwyn Bay, North Wales in 1990. During their nine-year existence they signed to Delerium Records and released two albums and appeared live on BBC Radio 1.

== Formation ==
Original members Neil Crud, and Robin Hemuss formed the band after discussing the merits of Hawkwind, both respected the psyche sounds but felt they would be a better band if they had a harder edge. This became the basis of the Sons of Selina sound, although that was as far as the Hawkwind comparison went as Crud's punk influence complimented Hemuss' classical training. Both were previously in the notorious North Wales punk band 4Q. The band/project released a number of 'cassette albums' on the underground tape label 'Music & Elsewhere' in the early 1990s, proving to be the label's best selling act.

== Releases ==
The Sons of Selina released their debut 7" single "Anxiety" on Crud's label Secrets of Sound on 1 May 1992,. It earned regular national airplay on BBC Radio One by DJs Mark Radcliffe, Mark Goodier and Annie Nightingale.

They were subsequently signed to the underground label Delerium Records and released a further two singles and the albums "Nour d'Oui" (in 1994) and "Fire in the Hole" (in 1998).

Electropunk band Psycho Sexual Sex Terrestrials recorded an early Sons of Selina song "Creatures of The Night" in 2004 and invited Neil Crud to write and record new lyrics for the song. The release became a minor nightclub classic. This version was subsequently remixed by Head in the Shed in 2008, and the 2004 version was issued on 12" vinyl in 2020. A 'mash-up' version with Snoop Dogg featuring on "Of The First Water" was available on-line in the late 1990s, but has since disappeared. The same song resurfaced in 2009 being mashed up with Eminem.

The track "The Last Ditch" was used as a signature tune to advertise a Ski-ing show on Sky Sports TV in 2001.

Cherry Red Records acquired the rights to Delerium's back catalogue and on 28 February 2011 released a triple CD Last Daze of The Underground, which features Sons of Selina's second single "Life is But". Record Collector magazine described the song as 'gruff, strident and almost a hit single.'

== Line up ==
BBC DJ Mark Radcliffe invited the band to perform a live session on his Radio One show. At the time being only a two-piece studio project Neil and Robin had to recruit a live band and did so, adding Steve 'Sync' Robins, Martin Wilding, Steve 'Bonehead' Jones, Ken Mainardis and Alan Matthews (AKA Cumi Pants). This line up began playing live, making their debut appearance at a festival near Llannefydd in rural North Wales.

Bassist Ken left after three gigs to work for Reuters in London and the band became a six-piece. Robin took over and he too was eventually replaced by ex-Pocket Venus bassist Chris Bainbridge.

With Robin gone, Neil and Steve Sync became the working nucleus of the band and put together the second and final album "Fire in the Hole" but family constraints and line-up issues began taking their toll the band and things fizzled out by 1999.

== Recent years ==
- Neil Crud began concentrating on media work (including at BBC Radio Wales), producing videos for bands (The Alarm, Spear of Destiny, Global Parasite, Homespun and compiling the link2wales archive website). He also had a brief spell managing Pocket Venus, releasing two singles on his Secrets of Sound Record Label. Since 1999 Neil has compiled link2wales.co.uk website, and in 2012 he started a new 'subpop-punk' band Braxton Hicks and then in 2015 a 'sub-hardcore' band Spam Javelin. He also presented an alternative radio show on Tudno FM from 2016 for four years, before taking it to Louder Than War Radio in December 2021.
- Steve Sync along with ex-4Q member Cumi Pants joined punk band Alien Matter and their Sons of Selina influence played heavily on the band's sound, turning them into a heavier, punkier version of the Sons. Both went on to join The Affliction and then Courteous Thief
- Martin Wilding became a studio engineer/producer for The Alarm and has worked with The Stone Roses, Doves, The Damned, Reef, The Levellers.
- Steve 'Bonehead' Jones is now a guitar technician and worked for Stiff Little Fingers, The Alarm and the Sex Pistols, Paulo Nutini, Muse, Level 42

== Discography ==
This is a discography of Sons of Selina official releases. There have been many other unofficial bootleg and cassette releases along with several compilation album appearances.

- "Anxiety" – 7" single – May 1992
- "Life Is But" – 7" single – June 1993
- "Jam Tomorrow" – on "Secrets Of Sound" 7" compilation EP – October 1993
- Nour d'Oui – CD / LP – June 1994
- "Terminus" – EP CD – September 1996
- "Our Glass" – CD single – March 1998 (promo only)
- Fire In The Hole – CD Album – September 1999
- "Creatures Of The Night" - 12" single - 15 May 2020 (vs Psycho Sexual Sex Terrestrials)
