= Datblygu =

Welsh experimental rock group

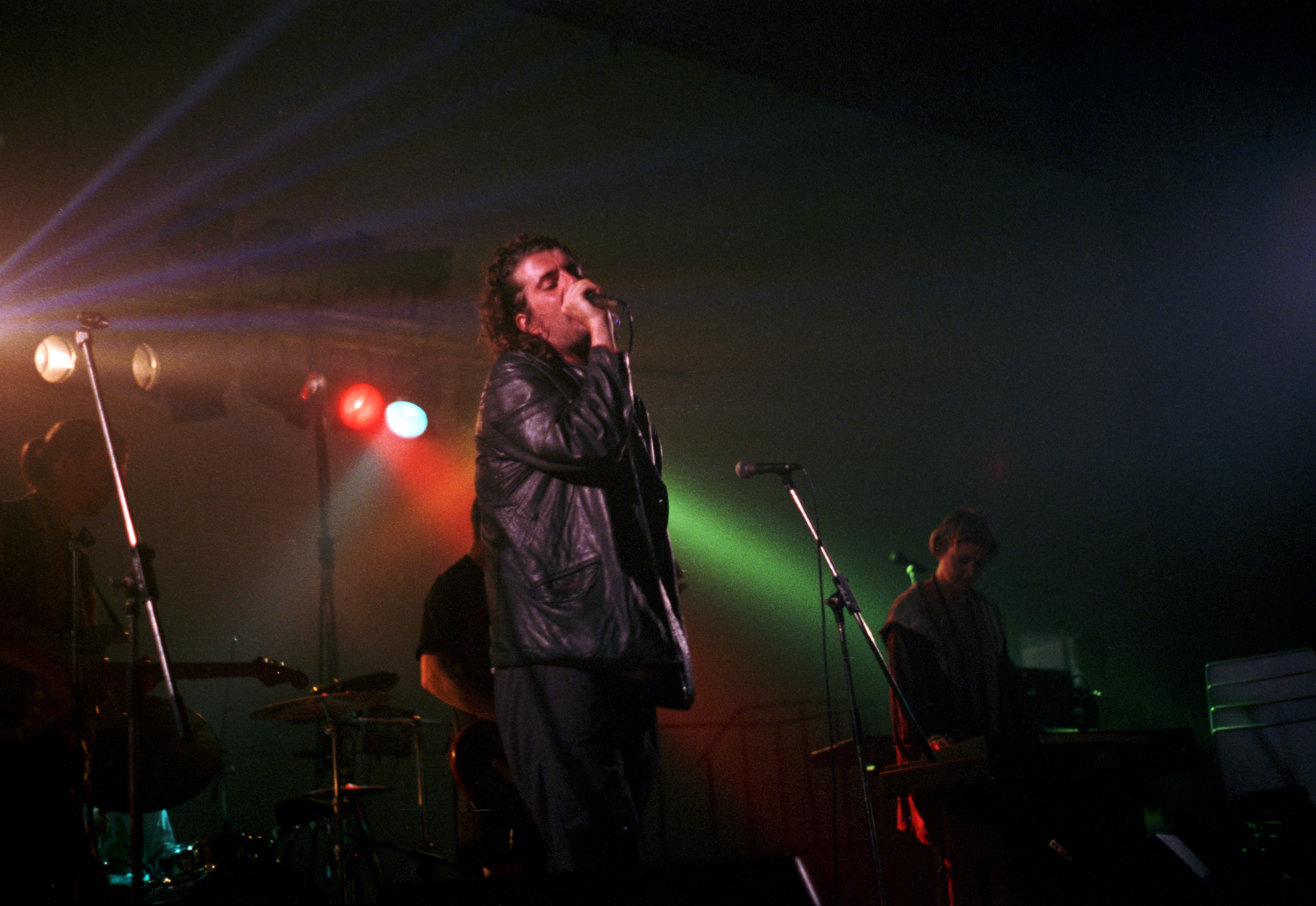

Background information
- Origin: Aberteifi, Wales
- Genres: Post-punk, minimal wave, experimental rock, art rock
- Years active: 1982–95, 2012–2021
- Labels: Anhrefn, Ankst
- Past members: David Edwards; Patricia Morgan; T. Wyn Davies

Datblygu (Welsh pronunciation: [datˈbləɡi] meaning "develop" or "developing") were a Welsh experimental rock group formed in 1982. They are regarded as a catalyst of the new wave of Welsh rock in the early 1980s.

== History ==
The band was formed by vocalist David R. Edwards and instrumentalist T. Wyn Davies in 1982 while they were at Ysgol Uwchradd Aberteifi in Cardigan, with instrumentalist Patricia Morgan joining in 1984. Edwards' lyrics were almost entirely in the Welsh language, the subject matter reflecting his "extreme disillusionment" with life in Wales in the early 1980s era under Margaret Thatcher. After four cassette-only releases on Casetiau Neon, the band had their first vinyl release in 1987 on Anhrefn Records, with the Hwgr-Grawth-Og EP featuring just Edwards and Morgan, which was picked up by John Peel and led to a session being recorded for his BBC Radio 1 show (the first of five such sessions). While Welsh radio gave the band little airplay, they also found an outlet through Geraint Jarman's Fideo 9 television show on S4C. The band's first album, Wyau (Eggs), was released in 1988, and was followed two years later with Pyst (Posts) on the Ofn label. Davies left in 1990 and the group continued as a duo for a while, before being augmented by a series of musicians, notably drummer Al Edwards. Moving to Ankst Records, the Christmas-themed Blwch Tymer Tymor cassette was issued in 1991. Edwards collaborated with Tŷ Gwydr and Llwybr Llaethog on the 1992 album LL.LL v T.G. MC DRE, before releasing a final Datblygu album in 1993 with Libertino. After a single, "Alcohol"/"Amnesia" in 1995, the band split up.

In August 2008 a new 7-inch single "Can y Mynach Modern" (The Song of the Modern Monk) was released. The song recounts (over its brief ninety seconds) the turmoil and madness that engulfed Edwards as the band fell apart in the mid nineties and the long road to recovery that resulted from the fallout. The track is intended as a full stop on their legacy rather than a brand new start.

Datblygu have been cited as a major influence on the generation of Welsh bands that followed, including Gorky's Zygotic Mynci and Super Furry Animals (who covered Datblygu's "Y Teimlad" on their Mwng album).

In a rare TV appearance, Edwards featured on S4C documentary programme O Flaen dy Lygaid in 2009, presented by Cardiff-based broadcaster and friend of Edwards's, Ali Yassine, which followed Edwards and his efforts to recover from mental illness. The programme also featured Datblygu bandmember and former Pobol y Cwm actress Ree Davies and her own battle against mental illness.

In 2012 an exhibition celebrating the band's history was held in a Cardiff coffee shop. Edwards and Morgan reunited in 2012 for the EP Darluniau'r Ogof Unfed Ganrif ar Hugain. A new mini-album, Erbyn Hyn, was released in June 2014.

In 2020, an album Cwm Gwagle, was released. It was No. 2 in The Quietus' list of 2020's Best of Weird Britain – "Another crucial document of a brilliant band".

Edwards died 22 June 2021.

== Discography ==
- Casetiau Neon
  - Amheuon Corfforol ('Body doubts') – cassette EP; c. 1982
  - Trosglwyddo'r Gwirionedd ('Transferring the truth') – cassette EP; c. 1983
  - Fi Du ('Black Me') – cassette EP; c. 1984
  - Caneuon Serch i Bobl Serchog ('Love songs for lovers') – cassette EP; c. 1985
- Anhrefn Records
  - Hwgr Grawth-Og – 7-inch EP; 1986
  - Wyau ('Eggs') – LP; 1988
- Ofn Records
  - Pyst ('Posts') – LP; 1990
- Ankst Records
  - Blwch Tymer Tymor ('Season mood box') – cassette LP; 1991
  - Peel Sessions: No AIDS, No Salmonella, and No Gulf War Respectively – LP; 1992 (compilation of the first 3 of the band's 5 Peel Sessions)
  - Libertino – CD; 1993
  - "Alcohol" / "Amnesia" – single; 1995
  - Wyau / Pyst – CD; 1995 (composed of the two earlier albums of the same names)
- Ankstmusik Records
  - Datblygu 1985–1995 – CD; 1999 (collection of previously released singles, compilation tracks and EPs)
  - Wyau, Pyst a Libertino – double CD; 2004 (the three previous albums reissued as a double CD)
  - Can Y Mynach Modern – 7-inch single; 2008
  - The Peel Sessions 1987–1993 – CD; 2008 (all five Peel sessions)
  - Darluniau'r Ogof Unfed Ganrif ar Hugain – 7-inch vinyl EP; 2012
  - Erbyn Hyn – CD mini-album; 2014
  - Porwr Trallod – LP, CD; 2015
  - Cwm Gwagle – LP; 2020
  - Terfysgiaith - 1982-2022- LP; 2023
