= Taff Acre =

- Genre: Soap opera
- Country of origin: Wales
- Original language: English
- No. of seasons: 1
- No. of episodes: 26

Production
- Running time: 30 minutes
- Production company: HTV

Original release
- Network: ITV
- Release: 24 September – 18 December 1981

Taff Acre is a Welsh television soap opera produced by Harlech Television (HTV) Wales for the ITV network.

Taff Acre was a fictional village in South Wales, set just outside Cardiff. The series dealt with the lives of the Johnson family.

Transmitted twice a week between September and December 1981, the series was not renewed beyond its initial run of 26 episodes.

== Cast ==
- Richard Davies - Max Johnson
- Rhoda Lewis - Beth Johnson
- Sue Jones-Davies - Sian Johnson
- Dewi "Pws" Morris - Gareth Johnson
- Beth Morris - Cilla Johnson
- Stuart Davis - Wayne Johnson
- Myfanwy Talog - Jan Evans
- Robert Blythe - Danny Evans

== See also ==
- List of Welsh television series
