= Fideo 9 =

Fideo 9 (English: Video 9) was a Welsh language television programme broadcast on S4C from 1988 to 1992. It helped launch the music careers of several Welsh singers, including Euros Childs and Gruff Rhys, and giving a platform for bands such as Y Cyrff.

The name "Fideo 9" is derived from the time of its regular Thursday evening slot and its content of music videos.

The programme was presented by Eddie Ladd.
