= Anhrefn Records =

Welsh record label

Recordiau Anhrefn (Welsh for Anhrefn Records) was a record label established in 1983 by Rhys Mwyn.

Based in the small mid-Wales village of Llanfair Caereinion, before Rhys and his brother Sion Sebon moved to Bangor, North Wales, the record label was initially an outlet for their own band Yr Anhrefn but soon went on to release records by other Welsh groups, providing early exposure for such influential names as Datblygu, Fflaps and Llwybr Llaethog.

Its second release came in the form of a compilation album called Cam o'r Tywyllwch which rose to prominence on its release in 1985 when John Peel played tracks off it on his BBC Radio One show. The album spawned Machlud (who featured a very young Gruff Rhys who would later form Super Furry Animals) and Y Cyrff (two of whom would later form Catatonia).

Although only releasing a handful of records between 1983 and its dissolution in 1990, the label provided a subversive alternative to the ultra-conservative Welsh music scene of the time. Its independent and outward looking approach contrasted drastically with the establishment's isolated entrenchment and brought Welsh language music to corners of the World that had no previous knowledge of its existence, providing a foundation for the Welsh 'Cool Cymru' music boom of the mid '90s, led by Super Furry Animals, Catatonia and Gorky's Zygotic Mynci. The label's legacy has continued to be lauded 25 years since 'Cool Cymru'.

In 2007 Rhys Mwyn reactivated the label from his PR office at The Galeri in Caernarfon, and began releasing left-field artists such as Beastellabeast and Patrick Jones.

== See also ==
- Lists of record labels
