= The Steppes (band) =

- Genres: neo-psychedelic rock band
- Members: John Fallon; David Fallon; Eddie Gryzb; Tim Gilman

The Steppes were an Irish American guitar based neo-psychedelic rock band that emerged in the mid-1980s.

== History ==
In late 1982 singer-songwriter brothers John and David Fallon got together with Eddie Gryzb and recorded (and self-released 200 copies of) a five-track 7-inch EP under the moniker 'The Blue Macs.' They mailed the bulk of the pressed EPs to record labels and magazines, and were quickly featured in Melody Maker in March 1983 with a positive review of said EP, noting their evident influences: ..."think of Weller, think of Dylan, Think of Lennon..."

In 1983 the band expanded the lineup to four members (adding guitarist Tim Gilman and replacing drummer Eddie Gryzb with Dante), changed its name to The Steppes, and demoed songs that would be released as a self-titled debut album on Mystic Records in 1984. The record found its way onto college radio in the US and imported copies spread throughout Europe.

The next few years saw The Steppes playing several shows in southern California, as well as demoing many songs with their new drummer Jim Bailey. The band then signed to Greg Shaw's Voxx label who would put out several of the band's records, starting with 1986s 'Drop of The Creature,' recorded in west LA. The album received critical acclaim and includes fan favorites such as "A Play on Wordsworth" and "Holding Up Well."

The band began to be occasionally miscategorized as being part of the Paisley Underground neo-psychedelic revival, apparently because during this period they sometimes performed with some of those L.A.-based bands.

1988 saw the band release the album 'Stewdio', which was produced by Brett Gurewitz of Bad Religion. They embarked on their first tour of Europe which was lauded as a success with stops in Greece having 1,000+ people in attendance. In November '88 they began work on their next album 'Enquire Within.'

Recorded over a four-week period at Goldust Studios in Bromley, UK, 'Enquire,' is the band's third release on Voxx records and saw a progression in the sound of The Steppes as well as an increase in press exposure, with the then-new Q Magazine calling the record "a strange, but rather fascinating brew." Released in 1989, the album includes fan favorites such as "Master James" and "In Your Prime." By 1990 The Steppes were residing in different parts of the world(USA, Germany, Ireland) but still managed to record what many regard as their career defining album, "Harps & Hammers." Like the albums preceding it, "Harps" accumulated expanded positive press and continued to finely hone the band's developing sound. Soon after the release of "Harps & Hammers" the band dissolved. This has been historically attributed to complications involved with getting the band all on the same continent. A live album 'Alive Alive, Oh' was released posthumously on Voxx records in 1991.

In September 1991 John Fallon recorded a solo album in London. It was released in 1992 by Voxx records, initially being credited to The Steppes, erroneously. It was eventually re-released with proper crediting going to John Fallon.

Each of the respective band members remain largely inactive musically, although Delerium Records owned by Richard Allen (who also managed the band from 1989 - 1991) persuaded the Steppes to reconvene in June 1995 and write and record a new one-off studio album, 'Gods, Men and Ghosts.' The album was produced and recorded in Milwaukee by John Frankovic of the band Plasticland and released by Delerium in 1997. A rarities album was also released on Delerium in 1997 along with sonically improved CD editions of 'Drop Of The Creature' and 'Stewdio'(also including the band's first EP).

In 2011 John Fallon re-activated his musical career by recording and releasing a 7-inch single on vinyl, "Picture Yourself Today" backed with "Theme For Steve McQueen," as well as returning to performing live.

== Legacy and Recent News ==
2013 saw the release of a two-disc compendium by Cherry Red Records spanning the entire recorded output of The Steppes from 1983 to 1997. Entitled 'Green Velvet Electric' the set includes 41 songs and was released on October 28 in the UK and November 5 in the U.S.A. In 2016 the Italian label Teen Sound Records reissued The Steppes' "Drop Of The Creature" in a gatefold vinyl edition with two bonus cuts, liner notes, lyrics and unseen pictures of the band

== Musical Style/Influences ==
The Steppes' influences include: The Beatles, The Rolling Stones, Led Zeppelin, The Who, The Kinks, Bob Dylan, The Byrds, Neil Young, Donovan, Chicago Chess Records blues, Vivaldi, Handel, and Irish folk music.

== Discography ==
Studio Releases

- The Steppes (1984) self titled mini album with 8 tracks
- Drop Of The Creature (1986)
- Stewdio (1988)
- Enquire Within (1989)
- Harps & Hammers (1990)
- Atomic Cossack (1992) in reality a John Fallon solo album, also released under his own name
- Gods, Men And Ghosts (1997)

Live Releases

- Alive, Alive, Oh! (1991)

Compilation Releases

- Tourists From Timenotyet (1988)
- Rarities (1997)
- Green Velvet Electric - A Compendium 1983-1997 (2013)

== Primary Band Members ==
- John Fallon
- David Fallon
- Tim Gilman
- Jim Bailey
