= Kava Kava (band) =

British rock band/live dance act

- Origin: Huddersfield, England, United Kingdom
- Genres: Rock, dance, soul
- Years active: 1993–present
- Labels: Delerium Records, Chocolate Fireguard Records (current), Midnight Swimming
- Members: Pat Fulgoni
- Past members: Jason Riley; Matt Bond; Chris Sykes; Jez Barton; DJ Bliss
- Website: http://www.kavakavamusic.com/

Kava Kava is an English rock band/live dance act from Huddersfield, England featuring the vocals, production, and songwriting of Pat Fulgoni.

They started as a four-piece live psychedelic funk outfit with heavy George Clinton influences with Pat Fulgoni on vocals, keyboards, and brass, Jason Riley on bass, Mathew Bond on guitar, and Chris Sykes on drums. In the U.K., Kava Kava cut their teeth through the underground festival/party scene, signing to Delerium Records and touring Europe and the U.K. amongst other artists signed to the label including Porcupine Tree and indie band Embrace. The NME describing the band as "gorgeous new psychedelic funk" for their debut album You Can Live Here.

The band expanded into a six-piece and released 2004's Maui album on independent label Chocolate Fireguard Records. The music on Maui is more dance, electronic, funk, and disco influenced than their past work. They have notched up tours of the United States, China, and all over Europe, including Glastonbury Festival, Sziget Festival, SXSW Festival, Marktrock Festival, Trutnov Open Air Music Festival, and the Midi Modern Music Festival. Their music has been featured in a number of films and TV shows including Dirt, The Boys & Girls Guide to Getting Down, John from Cincinnati, Hollywood Sex Wars, LA Riding Club, and the Golden Globe award–winning TV series Weeds and played by tastemaker DJs such as Sat Bisla and Nic Harcourt from KCRW. Pat Fulgoni continues to write music and tour as Kava Kava whilst collaborating with numerous other artists including many dance music artists signed to Hospital Records, Shogun Audio, Spearhead Records, and Viper Recordings, and from time to time, organises opportunities for bands (for example, the all Yorkshire showcases at the British Music Embassy venue SXSW).

Kava Kava continues gigging with their current line-up of Pat Fulgoni (vocals), Ben Wallbanks (drums), Alex Krzesinski (guitars), Rob Crisp and Ian Bailey (saxophone), and Mitch Cockman (bass)

== Discography ==
=== Albums ===
- Kava Kava in 1994 on Chocolate Fireguard Records (licensed to (Faust Records)
- You Can Live Here in 1995 on Delerium Records
- Supalube in 1997 on Delerium Records
- Maui in 2004 on Chocolate Fireguard Records
- Forwards in June 2009 on Midnight Swimming (USA only)

=== Singles and EPs ===
- Dither EP in 1993 on Chocolate Fireguard Records
- Swivel in 1995 on Delerium Records
- Freedom in 1997 on Delerium Records
- Funked Up & Freaked Out / Beats for Cheats (Zion Train "Cheat Beat Manifesto", "Beats Fi Cheats" mixes) in 2001 on Chocolate Fireguard Records
- Pursuit / Waves with Acetate in 2001 on Emotif
- Maui vinyl in 2004 on Chocolate Fireguard Records
- Bank Job vinyl in 2004 on Chocolate Fireguard Records
- Beats for Cheats digital EP in 2007 on Chocolate Fireguard Records with Zion Train and Blue Amazon remix
- Bank Job digital EP in 2007 on Chocolate Fireguard Records
- Don't Stop the Music digital EP in 2007 on Chocolate Fireguard Records
- Tic digital EP in 2007 on Chocolate Fireguard Records with Jon Kennedy remix
- "Clarity" digital single in 2010 on Chocolate Fireguard Records with B Complex remix

==== Pat Fulgoni ====
- Dark Side of the Blues / Pat Fulgoni Live in Prague in 2000 on Faust Records
- Still In Luv With You in 2003 on Subliminal Soul
- Still In Luv With You (Part 2) in 2003 on Subliminal Soul
- Do You See Love with Zion Train in 2003 on Silicon Hustler
- Do You See Love with Zion Train in 2003 on Universal Egg
- Your Love with 2020 Soundsystem & Diane Charlemagne in 2006 on 2020 Recordings
- Beliefs with Nu:tone in 2007 on Hospital Records
- Maybe I Was Wrong with London Elektricity in 2008 on Hospital Records
- Transporter with Logistics in 2010 on Hospital Records
- Turn Up The Music with Camo & Krooked in 2010 on Hospital Records

=== Compilations ===
- Pick & Mix in 1995 on Delerium Records
- No Compromize (Dreadzone / Wedding Present / Utah Saints / Chumbawamba / Zion Train / X-CNN / Cud / Kava Kava (band) / Tony Benn) in 1997 on Delerium Records
- Taster Sounds From The Funky Underground in 2000 on Chocolate Fireguard Records
- Taster Sounds From The Funky Underground Volume 2 in 2002 on Chocolate Fireguard Records
- Chillout Cafe in 2003 on IRMA
- Chill Out Café, Vol. 7 feat. Michael Stipe & Koop in 2004 on Sonic
- Atomic Hooligan: DJ International Allstars in 2004 on DJ Magazine
- Interesting Flavours with The Bluefoot Project, awayTEAM, Bentley Rhythm Ace, La Cedille, Freddy Fresh, and Godessa in 2005 on Chocolate Fireguard Records
- Music Week MIDEM CD in 2007
