= Eddie Ladd =

Welsh dancer and television presenter

Eddie Ladd (born 18 April 1964) is a Welsh television presenter and leading dance and performance artist.

== Early life and education ==
Eddie Ladd's birth name is Gwenith Owen. She grew up on a farm near Cardigan, West Wales. Subsequently she studied Drama and Music at Aberystwyth University. She graduated in 1985.

When Owen joined the acting union, Equity, she registered her name as Eddie Ladd because "it sounded quite snappy".

== Career ==
From 1989 she was the "controversial presenter" of the Welsh language television music show Fideo 9 on S4C. She also fronted The Slate (in English) on BBC2.

Ladd was a member of the anarchic performance company Brith Gof for ten years. She toured with them internationally across Europe and South America.

She has created her own works and projects since the early 1990s. Her solo show, Club Luz, won an award at the 2003 Edinburgh Festival. In 2005 she was chosen by the British Council to represent the best of Welsh theatre at the Edinburgh Festival, together with No Fit State Circus and Volcano Theatre.

In 2009 Ladd created Ras Goffa Bobby Sands/The Bobby Sands Memorial Race, a 50-minute theatrical piece about the Irish hunger striker Bobby Sands. The play, staged on a giant running machine, toured Wales. The performance left Wales, with The Independent reviewing her appearance at 'The Place', London. The audio content is in English and Welsh, reflecting Ladd's personal agenda. The reviewer says, "at a London performance on an Irish subject, it felt like a different argument". Though the verbal content is difficult to hear, "the movement is strong. Ladd is a wiry, athletic performer, dogged and driven."

During the COVID-19 lockdown in 2020, Ladd performed an hour-long live performance, Fy Ynys Las, which mapped her family farm, Maesglas, on the Ceredigion coast. It used photographs, drone footage, music and a "backstage" tour of the farm.

In June 2022 she became the presenter of Noson Gelf / Art Night, a regular programme filmed by Culture Colony and broadcast on the online platform AM.

Ladd was announced as one of the honorary presidents of the 2026 National Eisteddfod of Wales. In June 2026 in the lead up to the Eisteddfod, Ladd led the tour of 'Lord Rhys' through Pembrokeshire, narrating at each location, before being suspended from the walls of Cardigan Castle on the final day to narrate a special ceremony. Minister for the Welsh Language, Anna Brychan, declared in the Senedd that Ladd should become a "national treasure".

== Awards and recognition ==
- NESTA Fellowship (2001)
- Edinburgh Festival Total Theatre Award (2003), for physical and visual theatre
- Best Dance Artist, The Wales Theatre Awards (2016).
- Honorary president of the 2026 National Eisteddfod of Wales

== See also ==
- List of dancers
