= Mandragora (band) =

English rock band

- Mandragora performing in 2009

Background information
- Origin: Brighton, England
- Genres: Neo-psychedelia; space rock; progressive rock; jazz fusion; instrumental rock; world
- Years active: 1983–present
- Labels: Babbleon Records; Delerium; Mystic Stones
- Members: Phil Thornton, Simon Williams

Mandragora are an English space rock/world dance music band from Brighton, England, whose formative output can be described as psychedelic rock with ethnic sounds and tribal rhythms. Formed in 1983, the band have released 5 albums of their own, and a collaborative album with Phil Thornton. They built up a loyal following on the free festival circuit of the 1980s and 1990s, and were signed to Delerium Records. In recent years, Mandragora have evolved into a world music/electronic dance act featuring singers and musicians from all corners of the globe.

== History ==
=== Early years ===
Mandragora began life as a Hawkwind influenced psychedelic rock band formed by Simon Williams in 1983. They played gigs and festivals around the UK including the Stonehenge Free Festival of 1984. Their first album was a self-financed cassette only release called Somethink Missing. In 1983, Simon Williams saw a performance by innovative New Age synthesizer pioneer, Phil Thornton at a festival in Sussex and after the show the two met. So in 1988 when Mandragora were asked to open for Hawkwind on their UK tour, Phil Thornton was invited to play synths with the band. With improvisation a key component of Mandragora's live concerts, Phil, with his Moog synthesizer and samplers, gave them a much more sophisticated sound. As a side project during the 1980s, Thornton assisted Alex Sanders composing the music for Sanders' Mother Matrix incantation.

While the band's early material, due to its guitar and synth driven nature, was always compared favourably to other similar acts such as Ozric Tentacles, the band always experimented with different musical styles. It is this interest and experimentation that led to the band's style and integration of many different musical genres, with Simon Williams stating that the impact Phil Thornton's studio experience and production skills had on the second album, 1991's Head First (Resonance Records), was immense, the band started to receive airplay on BBC radio with John Peel and Mark Radcliffe playing their track "Zarg". Two studio albums (Head First and Earthdance), a live album (Temple Ball) and a collaboration with Phil Thornton on his solo album While The Green Man Sleeps followed to critical acclaim.

Mandragora have toured extensively throughout their career and played in many European countries, including Israel, Germany, Russia, Italy, Denmark, France, Éire, Hungary, Belgium, the Netherlands, Czech Republic, Switzerland, Hungary and the UK. To this end, Mandragora started to gain a large following around the UK free festival scene, including three appearances at the Glastonbury Festival. They were also invited to open for many varied artists such as The Wailers, Gil Scott-Heron, Transglobal Underground, Gong, The Orb and The Shamen. Niall Hone has since gone on to join Hawkwind and Nik Hunt has joined Here & Now.

=== Later years ===
Mandragora in 2009

The release of the band's most recent album, Pollen, in 1998 saw them shift into a more dance orientated direction, encompassing elements of dub, psy-trance and Celtic music. They drew on both traditional world musical styles and the mechanisms of the psychedelic dance scene. Also on this album were notable guest appearances from Howard Marks and Arthur Brown. After the release of Pollen the band took a hiatus. Multi-instrumentalists Simon Williams and Phil Thornton went on to form Earthdance a group of musicians, film makers and producers specialising in world/dance and chillout music.

=== Resurgence ===
According to the band's official website, an album was scheduled for release in 2010 but since then has not been released to this day.

== Band members ==
- Simon Williams - guitar, synths, vocals
- Phil Thornton - keyboards, samples, e-bow, guitar
- Dalinda - vocals

== Former members ==
- Simon Cowburn - percussion
- Al Jenkins - bass
- Steve Elliott - bass
- Angus Ross - keyboards, vocals
- Andy Stokes - drums, percussion
- David C. Hëwitt - keyboards
- Niall Hone - bass, feedback, samples
- Pete Newman - drums, percussion
- Mick Reed - drums
- Geoff Holroyde - drums, percussion
- Nikelby Hunt - drums
- Nick Colegrave - synthesizer
- Tim Burton - Vocals and synth
- Guy Pearson - Drums
- Stuart Ranger - Bass
- Steve Cassidy - Drums

== Discography ==
=== Albums ===
- 1988 Over the Moon - LP/Cassette (Babbleon Records)
- 1991 Head First - LP/CD (Resonance Records) (CD version has three tracks more than the LP)
- 1992 Earthdance - LP/CD (Mystic Stones)
- 1994 Temple Ball - LP/CD (Mystic Stones)
- 1998 Pollen - CD (Delerium Records)

With Phil Thornton

- 1993 While the Green Man Sleeps - LP/CD (Mystic Stones)

As "Mandala"

- 1998 Gurning The Midnight Oil - CD (Mandragora Music)

=== Cassette only albums ===
- 1984 Somethink Missing
- 1990 Under the Sun Live
- 1992 Mandrake Madness (outtakes and Live)

Also, the track Conspiracy appears on the Delerium compilation A Psychedelic Psauna (In Four Parts).
