= Edward H. Dafis =

Former Welsh rock band

Breuddwyd Roc a Rol ("Rock and Roll Dream").

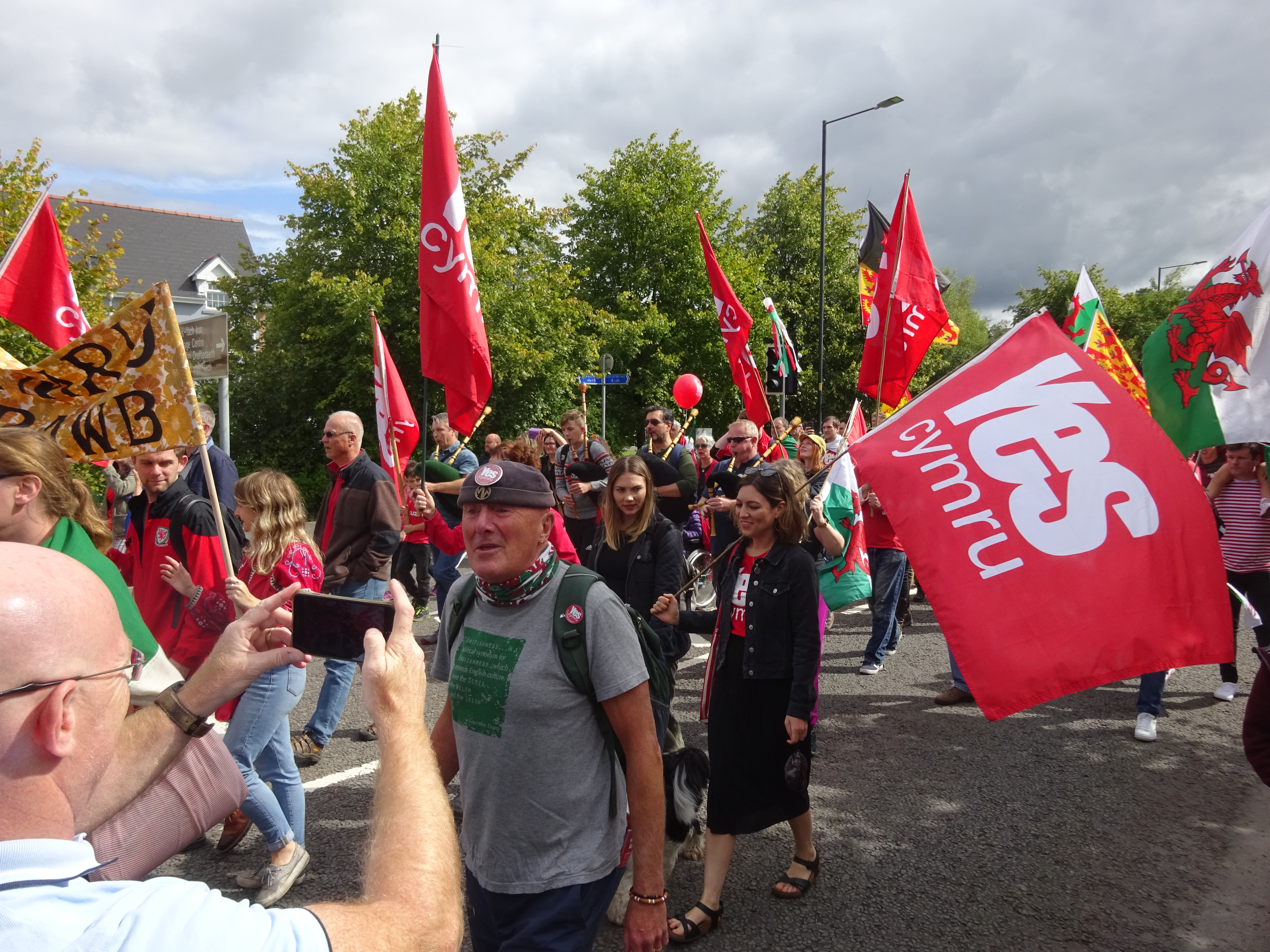
Dewi Pws, former band member.

Edward H. Dafis were a Welsh rock band that existed from 1973 to 1980.

== Biography ==
Edward H. Dafis were a Welsh language band that included Dewi 'Pws' Morris, Cleif Harpwood, Hefin Elis, John Griffiths and Charli Britton.

On the albums, 'Hen Ffordd Gymreig o Fyw', 'Sneb Yn Becso Dam', and often in live gigs, guitarist Geraint Griffiths also played with the band.

The band formed with an aim of moving Welsh language popular music away from close-harmony singing which was dominant at the time, to a more rock based sound.

The band released 5 albums.

In 1974 the band released the single "Ty Haf" ("Holiday Home") at a time where second homes in Wales was a controversial issue.

The group arguably started electronic dance music in Wales with the track "Smo Fi Ishe Mynd" ("Dun wanna go").

The drummer of the band, Charli Britton died in 2021 at the age of 68. Dewi 'Pws' Morris died in 2024 at the age of 76.

== Album Discography ==
- Hen Ffordd Gymreig o Fyw (1974, SAIN 1016M)
- Ffordd Newydd Eingl-Americanaidd Grêt o Fyw (1975, SAIN 1034M-B)
- 'Sneb yn Becso Dam (1976, SAIN 1053M)
- Yn Erbyn y Ffactore (1979, SAIN 1144M)
- Plant Y Fflam (1980, SAIN 1196M)
