= Llwybr Llaethog =

Welsh multi-genre band

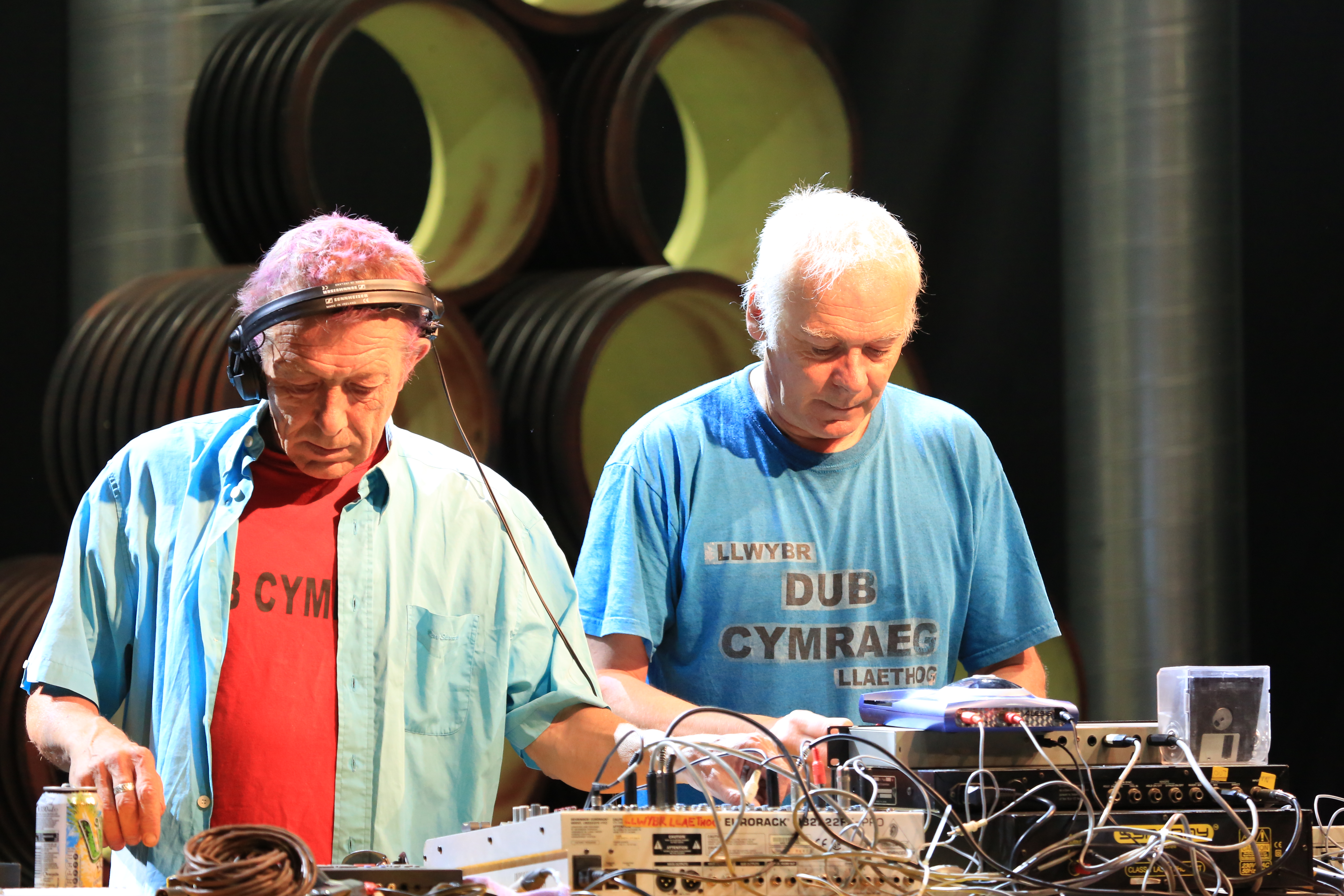

Background information
- Origin: Blaenau Ffestiniog, Wales
- Genres: Hip hop, Dub
- Years active: 1985–present
- Labels: Anhrefn Records, Ankst
- Members: Kevs Ford; John Griffiths
- Website: llwybrllaethog.co.uk

Llwybr Llaethog (Welsh for Milky Way, although the Milky Way has several names in Welsh folklore) are an experimental Welsh language band that effectively mix such varied musical genres as rap, dub, reggae, hip hop, and punk in their music.

== Background ==
Founded in London in 1985 by John Griffiths and Kevs Ford, the two teens had spent the 1970s growing up in Blaenau Ffestiniog's decaying industrial surroundings. The two were heavily influenced by reggae and the punk scenes that were sweeping the UK. After several years touring northern Europe with punk/ska band The Managing Directors, the turning point came in 1984 when John Griffiths was on vacation in New York City and was impressed by a group of youths he saw at the Roxy nightclub breakdancing, and the sounds of DJ Red Alert.

After returning to Wales, Griffiths fixed on the idea of marrying hip hop and left wing politics with the Welsh language. Llwybr Llaethog's debut release was an EP for the Welsh record label Anhrefn Records in 1986, titled Dull Di Drais, which combined Llwybr Llaethog's leftist political messages with what would become the band's trademark sound of turntable scratching, audio sampling, hip-hop, and cut-and-paste production. The band were also heavily promoted by English radio DJ John Peel.

== Discography ==
=== Singles ===
- Dull Di-Drais 7" – Anhrefn Records (1986)
- Tour De France 7" – Anhrefn Records (1987)
- Pam? 12" – Pinpoint Records (1988)
- Ni Fydd Y Chwyldro... 7" – Ankst (1992)
- Soccer MC 12" – Ankst (1996)
- Mera Desh 7" – Ankst (1997)
- Llanrwst (a version of Y Cyrff's song "Cymru, Lloegr a Llanrwst") – Fitamin Un (2001)

=== Albums ===
- Da! – Side Effects (1988)
- Be? – Pinpoint Records (1990)
- LL.LL v T.G. MC DRE – Ankst (1991)
- Mewn Dyb (In Dub) – ROIR (1991)
- Mad – Ankst (1996)
- Drilacila-(Croeso'99) – Ankst (1999)
- Hip Dub Reggae Hop – Ankst (2000)
- Stwff – Neud Nid Deud (2001)
- Anomie-Ville – Crai (2002)
- Mega Tidy – Rasal (2005)
- Chwaneg – Neud Nid Deud (2009)
- Curiad Cariad – Neud Nid Deud (2011)
- Dub Cymraeg – Neud Nid Deud (2013)
- I'r Dim – Neud Nid Deud (2014)
