= Zion Train =

British dub ensemble

- Origin: United Kingdom
- Genres: Dub; reggae; dance music
- Years active: 1988–present
- Label: Universal Egg
- Members: Neil Perch; Dave Hake; Bigga; Dubdadda; David Fullwood; Richard Doswell; Cara-Jane Murphy
- Past members: Ben Hamilton; David Tench; Colin Cod; Molara; Chris
- Website: www.wobblyweb.com

Zion Train are a British dub ensemble that formed in Oxford, 1988. They have consistently released music and toured from 1992 to present day. Their mix of reggae and dance music was a notable innovation in the early 1990s.

== History ==
Co-founder Neil Perch is an autodidact, he taught himself music production and composition after completing a master's degree in biochemistry in the mid eighties.

Initially formed in Oxford as a sound system in 1988 by Neil Perch and Ben Hamilton, Colin Cod and Dave Tench joined in 1990 upon relocation to London. The line-up was added to with vocalist Molara in 1992. Their initial releases were the 7" singles "Power One" and "Power Two", which became hits on the dub scene in the early 1990s. In 1992, they released the groundbreaking "Follow Like Wolves" single, which fused dub and acid house styles and spawned their reputation as innovators.

Their second album, Natural Wonders of the World in Dub, hit the UK indie charts in 1994 and was followed by several small-issue EPs. Additionally, they worked on remixes for The Shamen, Afro Celt Sound System, Loop Guru, Kava Kava and others. They released both vinyl and CD material on their own label, Universal Egg, until 1995, when they signed with China Records. They returned to their own label in 1999.

By 2001, internal disagreements within the band beginning led to Perch continuing the band with an almost new line-up. This line up consisted of long-term trumpeter Dave Hake, trombonist Bigga and an assortment of international session players and studio vocalists. In 2002, the Original Sounds of the Zion was released. Much of their back catalog was reissued in 2005. A year later saw the reissue of Siren. In 2007, the group released the album Live As One with members Perch, David Fullwood, P Lush, Pier Paolo Polcari, Bigga and Vedran Meniga. This album Zion Train won the 'Jamaican Reggae Grammy 2007' for 'Best Dub Recording'.

In 1998, Zion Train contributed to the album released by the Polish Never Again Association as a part of its "Music Against Racism" campaign. In 2021 the album was reissued as vinyl record 'One Race - Human Race. Music Against Racism: Part 2'.

== Influences ==
Perch said in 2016 interview that his influences were Jah Shaka, King Tubby, Ravi Shankar and Jimi Hendrix.

== Influenced ==
Their early albums, such as A Passage to Indica, have been cited as primary influences on the minimal techno and minimal dub genres.

== Discography ==
=== Albums ===
- A Passage to Indica (Universal Egg, 1993)
- Great Sporting Moments in Dub (Universal Egg, 1993)
- Natural Wonders of the World in Dub (Universal Egg, 1994)
- Siren (Universal Egg, 1995)
- Homegrown Fantasy (China, 1995)
- Grow Together (China, 1996)
- Love Revolutionaries (Universal Egg, 2000)
- Secrets of the Animal Kingdom in Dub (Universal Egg, 2000; recorded 1994)
- Original Sounds of the Zion (Universal Egg, 2002)
- Live As One (Universal Egg, 2007)
- State of Mind (Universal Egg, 2011)
- Land of the Blind (Universal Egg, 2015)
- Illuminate (Universal Egg, 2020)
- Dissident Sound (Universal Egg, 2023)
- Dubs of Perception (Universal Egg, 2025)

=== Remix albums and compilations ===
- Single Minded and Alive (Comp, China, 1997)
- Versions (Universal Egg, 2016)
- Original Sounds Remixed (Universal Egg, 2004)
- Live As One remixed (Universal Egg, 2009)
- 30th Anniversary 1988/2018 (Comp, Digital Traders Records, 2018)
- Illuminate in Dub (The Wibbly Wobbly World Of Music, 2021)

== Members ==
- Neil Perch - electronics, production (1988 – present)
- Dave Hake - trumpet (1990 – ?)
- Sebastian "Bigga" Harzmann - trombone (1999–present)
- Johnno "Dubdadda" - vocals (2001–present)
- David Fullwood (? - ?) - trumpet and flugel horn
- Richard Doswell (? - ?) - tenor saxophone and flute
- Cara-Jane Murphy (2020? - present) vocals

=== Past ===
- Ben Hamilton (1988 - ?)
- David Tench - production (1990 - 2001)
- Colin Cod - melodica (1990 - 2001)
- Molara - vocals (1992 - 2005)
- Chris - trombone (? - 2001)

=== On record ===
- Eddie Rieband – trombone on State of Mind
- Leroy Wallace – drums on State of Mind
- P Lush – guitars on State of Mind
- Katrien Peeters – violin and viola on State of Mind
