= Ysgol Uwchradd Aberteifi =

Coordinates: 52.088°N 4.656°W

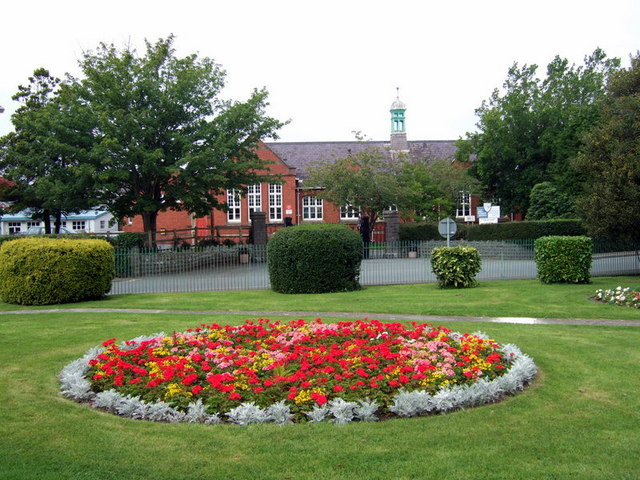

Location
- Park Place; Cardigan, SA43 2AD; Wales

Information
- Type: Secondary
- Established: 1896
- Local authority: Ceredigion County Council
- Specialist: Bilingual
- Headteacher: Mr Tristan Phillips
- Staff: 39 teachers and 27 support staff
- Gender: Mixed
- Age: 11 to 18
- Enrolment: Over 650 students
- Website: http://www.ysgol-uwchradd-aberteifi.co.uk/

Ysgol Uwchradd Aberteifi (Welsh for 'Cardigan secondary school') is a bilingual secondary school in Cardigan, Ceredigion, Wales. It offers secondary education from ages 11 to 18, incorporating GCSEs and A-Levels in its sixth form. The motto is Egni a Lwydd (Energy Succeeds).

The school is categorized as bilingual type C by the Welsh Government, meaning that 50–79% of subjects, excluding Welsh and English, are taught through the medium of Welsh but are also taught through the medium of English. According to the latest Estyn report in 2022, 21.3% of pupils spoke Welsh at home.

Mrs Nicola James was the school's Headteacher for twelve years until her retirement in August 2024.

The school appeared on S4C's Hip neu Sgip?: Yn erbyn y cloc in 2011, as part of a garden makeover item which took place at the school in September 2010.

The Proclamation ceremony for the Ceredigion National Eisteddfod of Wales took place at the school on 29 June 2019, though the Eisteddfod was eventually postponed to 2022.
