= Y Cyrff =

Welsh language indie band

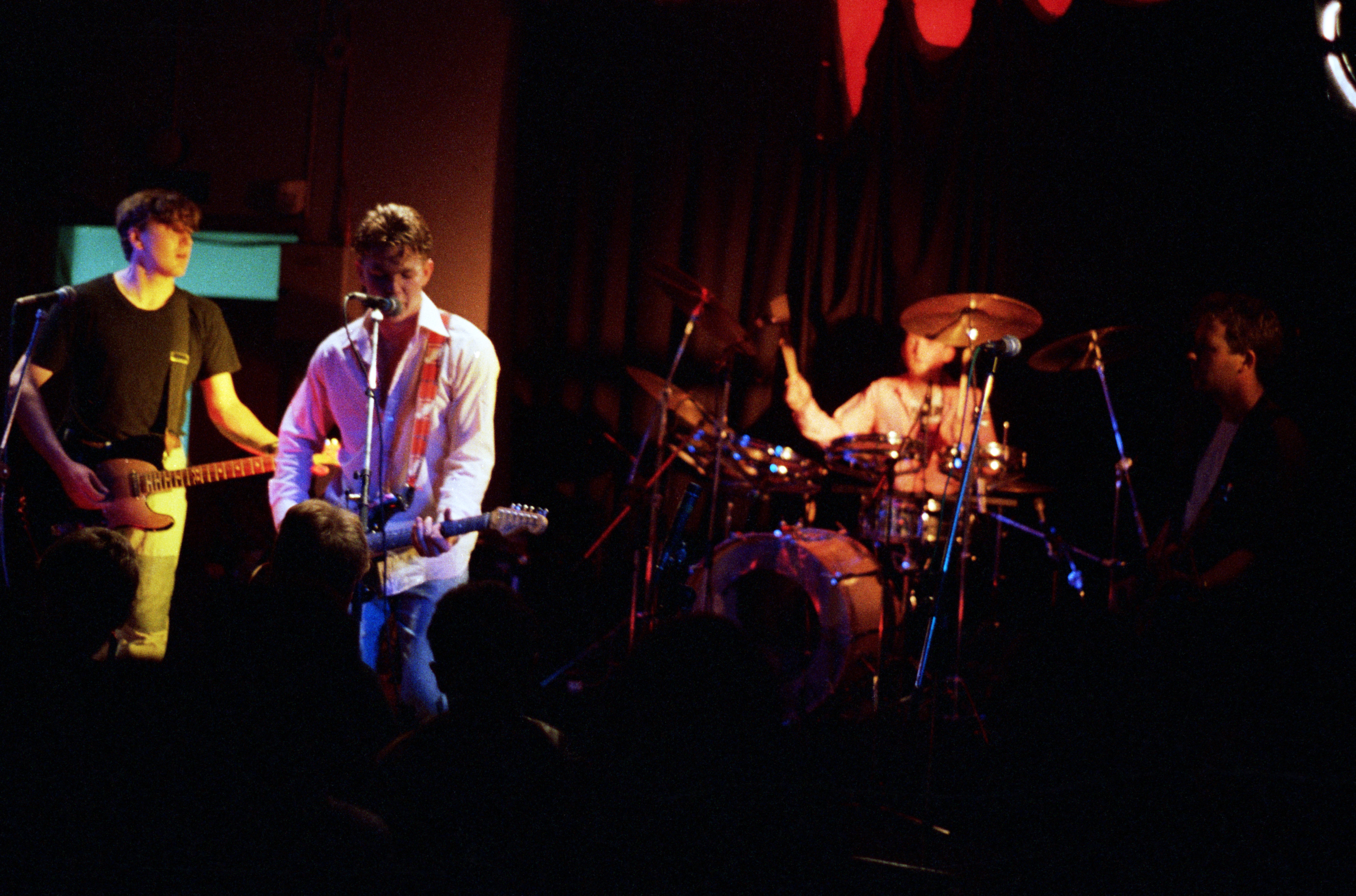
- Roc Ystwyth concert, Aberystwyth, 1987

Background information
- Origin: Llanrwst, Wales
- Genre: Rock
- Years active: 1983–1991
- Labels: Recordiau Anhrefn, Sain, Ankst, Rasal Cyf.
- Past members: Barry Cawley; Emyr Davies; Dylan Hughes; Mark Roberts; Paul Jones; Mark Kendall
- Website: www.ycyrff.co.uk

Y Cyrff (1983–1991; The Bodies) were a Welsh language indie band in the 1980s, regarded by many as one of the greatest Welsh language rock bands. Initially formed at the Ysgol Dyffryn Conwy secondary school in Llanrwst, Conwy, the original line-up consisted of Barry Cawley (bass), Emyr Davies (vocals), Dylan Hughes (drums) and Mark Roberts (lead guitars). They performed on Welsh language television, and internationally, until they broke up in 1991. Afterwards, Roberts formed Catatonia, with Jones joining the band a while later. Cawley was also a guitar technician for the band.

== History ==
Y Cyrff were formed by Mark Roberts in the fifth year of secondary school. The initial line-up had Barry Cawley on bass, Emyr Davies on vocals, and Dylan Hughes on drums. They were influenced by Joe Strummer and The Clash. Managing the band was Tony Schiavone, who was also their Geography teacher. Many of their earliest performances were at their school, Ysgol Dyffryn Conwy, but they also played at the Llanrwst community centre.

After the school years, Emyr left the band, and Roberts took over as vocalist. Around the same time, Cawley switched position to rhythm guitarist, allowing Paul Jones, a friend of Roberts' from outside school, to join the band as bassist. He was older than the other boys, and was working in a dog food factory at the time. The band performed Welsh language songs, and began to get noticed by the fanzines of the genre. They would often work with Yr Anhrefn, either supporting them in their concerts or doing the reverse, when Y Cyrff were booked as the lead act. Their first recorded work was on the Cam O'r Tywyllwch compilation album on Anhrefn Records in 1985 and their track Lebanon was described by reviewer Neil Crud as being "head and shoulders above" other songs on the album.

Y Cyrff formed their own record label to release the single "Pum Munud" ("Five Minutes") in 1986, and later that year they were offered the chance to perform on the S4C television channel. When they later performed in front of English speaking student unions, the band received some criticism from some Welsh speakers according to Rhys Mwyn. Y Cyrff were signed to the Sain record label and recorded the seven track long album, Y Testament Newydd ("The New Testament") in 1987. Dylan left the band shortly afterwards to join Yr Anhrefn, and was replaced by Mark Kendall.

The albums, Yr Atgyfodi and Llawenydd Heb Ddiwedd were critically praised, with the anthemic storm of a song, Cymru Lloegr a Llanrwst becoming a cover standard for Welsh bands.

Through connections with the Welsh television programme Fideo 9, they were able to make music videos and performed overseas in Warsaw, Poland. They also played at concerts arranged by the Welsh Language Society. It was at one of those performances where Y Cyrff played for the last time in 1991 at the Pavilion in Pontrhydfendigaid. The band broke up as they realised that they couldn't get mainstream success singing only in Welsh.

After the band split up, Mark Roberts went on to form Catatonia with Cerys Matthews. When the band signed to the Crai label, Roberts brought Jones into the band from Y Cyrff. Barry Cawley, who later worked as a guitar technician with Catatonia, was killed in 2000 when his cycle was hit by a car near Llanrwst.

== Personnel ==
- Barry Cawley - bass (1983-1985), rhythm guitars (1985-1991; died 2000)
- Emyr Davies - vocals (1983-1985)
- Dylan Hughes - drums (1983-1987)
- Mark Roberts - lead guitars (1983-1991), vocals (1985-1991)
- Paul Jones - bass (1985-1991)
- Mark Kendall - drums (1987-1991)

== Discography ==
=== Albums ===
- Dan y Cownter – ("Under the Counter")
- Y Testament Newydd – ("The New Testament")
- Yr Atgyfodi (1989) – ("The Resurrection")
- Awdl o Anobaith – ("Ode to Despair")
- Llawenydd Heb Ddiwedd (1991) – ("Endless Joy")
- Mae Ddoe Yn Ddoe (1992) – ("Yesterday is Yesterday")
- Damwain Mewn Ffatri Cyllell a Ffyrc – ("Accident in a Knife and Fork Factory")
- Atalnod Llawn (2005) – ("Full Stop")

=== Singles ===
- Yr Haint – ("The Disease")
- Pum Munud – ("Five Minutes")
- Hwyl Fawr Heulwen – ("Good-bye Sunshine")
