= David Hughes =

David Hughes may refer to:

== Arts ==
- Dave Hughes (born 1970), Australian comedian
- Dave Hughes (producer) (born 1971), American television producer and editor
- David Hughes (illustrator) (born 1968), English artist and illustrator
- David Hughes (Emmerdale), a character in the TV soap Emmerdale

=== Literature ===
- David Hughes (poet, born 1947), Welsh writer
- David Hughes (Eos Iâl) (1794–1862), Welsh poet and publisher
- David Hughes (novelist) (1930–2005), British novelist

=== Music ===
- David Hughes (musician) (born 1960), English keyboardist
- David Hughes (tenor) (1925–1972), English singer

== Science ==
- David Hughes (astronomer) (1941–2022), English astronomer specialising in comets
- David Edward Hughes (1831–1900), British-born inventor, known for the microphone, and later, American academic

== Sports ==
=== Cricket ===
- David Hughes (Hertfordshire cricketer) (born 1978), Irish cricketer
- David Hughes (Lancashire cricketer) (born 1947), English cricketer
- David Hughes (Somerset cricketer) (1934–2025), English cricketer

=== Football ===
- David Hughes (American football) (born 1959), American football player
- David Hughes (footballer, born 1943), English footballer
- Dave Hughes (footballer) (born 1945), Australian rules footballer
- David Hughes (footballer, born 1948), English footballer notably for Southport FC, see List of Bury F.C. players (1–24 appearances)
- David Hughes (footballer, born 1958) (1958–2023), English footballer
- David Hughes (footballer, born 1972), Welsh footballer
- David Hughes (footballer, born 1978), Welsh footballer, coach and manager.

=== Other sports ===
- David Hughes (hurler) (born 1967), Irish hurler
- David Hughes (sailor) (born 1978), American sailor

== Other persons ==
- David Hughes (English academic) (1753/1754–1817), principal of Jesus College, Oxford
- David Hughes (priest) (1785–1850), Welsh Anglican priest
- David Hughes (RAF officer) (1899–1955), First World War flying ace
- David Hughes (railroad executive), interim president and CEO of Amtrak, 2005–2006
- David Hughes (politician), Welsh politician

== Other uses ==
- Ysgol David Hughes, a bilingual secondary school on Anglesey, Wales
- 4205 David Hughes, a Mars-crossing asteroid
- SS David E. Hughes, a Liberty ship, named for David Edward Hughes

== See also ==
- Hughes (surname)
