= Welsh Folk-Songs =

1954 studio album by Meredydd Evans

Studio album by Meredydd Evans
- Released: 1954
- Recorded: 1954
- Genre: Welsh folk music
- Length: 32:53
- Label: Folkways

Meredydd Evans chronology
Welsh Folk-Songs (1954)	A Concert of Welsh Songs (1962)

Welsh Folk-Songs is the first album by Welsh folk music singer and collector Meredydd Evans, consisting of a cappella renditions of traditional Welsh-language folk songs. The album was recorded in New Hope, Pennsylvania after Moses Asch, founder of Folkways Records, contacted Evans, who was then studying at Princeton University. Upon release in 1954, Welsh Folk-Songs was acclaimed by The New York Times, who named it among the year's best records.

== Background ==
In 1945, Meredydd Evans formed the Welsh-language close harmony trio Triawd y Coleg. The group were soon noticed by the BBC and their subsequent appearances on the light entertainment radio programme Noson Lawen brought Evans' playful Welsh-language compositions to audiences across Wales. In 1948, Evans married Phyllis Kinney, an American-born opera singer who shared his interest in Welsh folk music, and the couple began performing together. In 1952, Evans, Kinney and their daughter Eluned moved to America where Evans enrolled at Princeton University, undertaking on a PhD in Philosophy. He was awarded his doctorate in 1955.

== Recording ==
I expected a call from Mr. Asch to say would you now please come and record, properly? But to my astonishment, he just released the record of what we had done that day and I think he was dead right in doing that.

— Meredydd Evans, 2008

During his second year of Princeton, Evans received a letter from Moe Asch, founder of Folkways Records, who was curious to hear Welsh folk songs. Evans was not previously aware of Asch, but accepted the invitation to record for him. Evans would later speak of his admiration for Asch's work collecting folk music from around the world.

In a studio in New Hope, Pennsylvania, Evans recorded an unaccompanied selection of secular songs that had survived the Welsh Methodist revival, many of which are among those preserved by the Welsh Folksong Society. Though he had thought "very roughly" about which songs to sing prior to the session, the selection was improvised. Evans believed the session was a test and was surprised when Asch issued the recordings as an album.

== Release ==
The album was released in the United States by Folkways Records in 1954, with packaging containing supplementary notes, lyrics (with English translation), cultural history and photographs by Frederic Ramsey, Jr. It was released on CD by Smithsonian Folkways in 2008.

== Reception and legacy ==
Professional ratings
Review scores
Source	Rating
AllMusic	4.5/5 stars

Welsh Folk-Songs received acclaim upon release. New York Folklore Quarterly commented "the rippling melodies with the abundance of vowel sounds are ably performed." High Fidelity considered the album "a treasure house of melody", opining "Meredydd Evans shares all the musical talent of his people." An anonymous reviewer for DownBeat wrote "the darkly moving language of Wales is sung beautifully by Meredydd Evans." At the end of 1954, The New York Times named it one of the twelve best popular light music records of the year. In the April 1955 issue of High Fidelity, Frederic Ramsey, Jr. included Welsh Folk-Songs in his list of "Ten Basic Folk Music Recordings", commenting that the album "knows no competition on any list".

In a retrospective review for AllMusic, Steve Winick praised Welsh Folk-Songs, opining "Evans' beautiful voice floats." Some later albums of traditional Welsh music have been judged against the album; in a 1956 review of Thomas L. Thomas's Welsh Traditional Songs, Howard LaFay of High Fidelity noted that the album "seriously threatens, but does not eclipse, Meredydd Evans' superlative and probably definitive recording of Welsh folk songs for Folkways". LaFay made a similar remark in his review of Delysé's Songs of Wales (1956), stating that the release doesn't threaten "the pre-eminence of Meredydd Evans' incomparable singing of Welsh folk songs on Folkways." Reflecting on the album's success in 2008, Evans commented "I hate to say this, but it's become a little bit of an icon. As if I were some sort of dim figure in the past, somehow."

In 2025, Uncut ranked Welsh Folk-Songs at number 434 in their list of "The 500 Greatest Albums of the 1950s", with contributor Jon Dale commenting that the recorded, recorded "unassumingly" by Asch, "benefits from its improvised nature: spirited, indeed ghostly."

== Track listing ==
All tracks performed solo by Meredydd Evans

=== Side one ===
1. "O Fy Mrodyr I, Un" – 1:35
2. "Y Gelynen" – 0:50
3. "Hiraeth" – 1:44
4. "Y Cariad Cyntaf" – 1:23
5. "Ei Di'r Deryn Du?" – 0:56
6. "Y Cyntaf Dydd o'r Gwyliau" – 0:53
7. "Y Cyntaf Dydd o'r Gwyliau" – 0:30
8. "Cyfri'r Geifr" – 0:45
9. "Y Broga Bach" – 0:21
10. "Bugeilio'r Gwenith Gwyn" – 1:33
11. "Ar Cyfer Heddiw'r Bore" – 0:32
12. "Si-Hwi-Hwi" – 1:00
13. "Titrwm Tatrwm" – 1:24
14. "Ffarwel i Langyfelach Lon" – 2:00

=== Side two ===
1. "Robin Ddiog" – 1:07
2. "Diofal Yw'r Aderyn" – 0:28
3. "Mae 'Nghalon i Cyn Drymed" – 0:38
4. "Pa Le Mae 'Nghariad i?" – 1:34
5. "Wel, Bachgen Ifanc Ydwyf" – 1:49
6. "Dacw 'Nghariad i Lawr yn y Berllan" – 1:31
7. "Bachgen Bach o Dincer" – 0:44
8. "Yr Hen Wyddeles" – 1:26
9. "Mab Annwyl Dy Fam" – 2:41
10. "I Ble 'Rwyt Ti'n Myned Fy Ngeneth Ffein Gu?" – 2:01
11. "Yr Hen Wr Mwyn" – 2:11
12. "Bugail Hafod y Cwm" – 1:17
