= Cyfri'r Geifr =

Song
- Language: Welsh
- Genre: Folk

Cyfri'r Geifr (Welsh for 'Counting the Goats'), also known as Oes Gafr Eto after the first line, is a Welsh folk song. Both the tune and the words are traditional, and have developed over the centuries.

== Variations and use as a vocal exercise ==
Most versions of the song are accelerando, with the song beginning slowly and increasing in speed for each new verse. The first four lines are repeated before each new goat is counted, and additional choruses may be included by simply changing the colour in each new verse. A particularly difficult "tongue twister" can be performed by singing each verse twice, doubling the speed the second time through. A pink goat is usually saved for the final verse, as the repeated Voiceless velar plosive at the end of "pinc" is the most difficult to sing at any speed.

For these reasons, the song is often used as a demonstration of the singers skill and is used as both a vocal warm up and a performative showstopper. The song is a popular test-piece in Welsh choral competitions, and has been recorded by many singers and choirs.

== Popular recordings ==
Meredydd Evans version of Cyfrir Geifr as fetaured on his 1954 album Welsh Folk-Songs

A version of the song was performed and recorded by Meredydd Evans throughout his life. Most notably, he recorded an acapella version during his time at Princeton University which was released on his album, Welsh Folk-Songs in 1954. The New York Times named the album as one of the twelve best popular light music records of the year.

== Lyrics ==
Although up to sixteen versions of the song have been identified, mainly regional, this version is the most common.

| Oes gafr eto? Oes heb ei godro? Ar y creigiau geirwon Mae’r hen afr yn crwydro. Gafr wen, wen, wen. Ie finwen, finwen, finwen. Foel gynffonwen, foel gynffonwen, Ystlys wen a chynffon wen, wen, wen. Gafr ddu, ddu, ddu. Ie finddu, finddu, finddu. Foel gynffonddu, foel gynffonddu, Ystlys ddu a chynffon ddu, ddu, ddu. Gafr goch, goch, goch. Ie fingoch, fingoch, fingoch. Foel gynffongoch, foel gynffongoch, Ystlys goch a chynffon goch, goch, goch. Gafr las, las, las. Ie finlas, finlas, fin las. Foel gynffonlas, foel gynffonlas, Ystlys las a chynffon las, las, las. And, traditionally, in the last verse the goat is always pink... Gafr binc, binc, binc. Ie fin binc, fin binc, fin binc. Foel gynffonbinc, foel gynffonbinc, Ystlys binc a chynffon binc, binc, binc. | Is there another goat? That's not been milked? On the craggy rocks The old goat is wandering. A white, white, white goat, Yes white lipped, white lipped, white lipped, A bald white tail, a bald white tail A white flank and tail, white, white, white. A black, black, black goat, Yes black lipped, black lipped, black lipped, A bald black tail, a bald black tail. A black flank and tail, black, black, black. A red, red, red goat, Yes red lipped, red lipped, red lipped, A bald red tail, a bald red tail. A red flank and tail, red, red, red. A blue, blue, blue goat, Yes blue lipped, blue lipped, blue lipped, A bald blue tail, a bald blue tail. A blue flank and tail, blue, blue, blue. A pink, pink, pink goat, Yes pink lipped, pink lipped, pink lipped, A bald pink tail, a bald pink tail. A pink flank and tail, pink, pink, pink. |
