= Bragod =

Bragod is a duo giving historically informed performances of mediaeval Welsh music. The members are Robert Evans and Mary-Anne Roberts. Their music ranges over a very wide timescale, from verses from the early medieval poem Y Gododdin to 19th century songs.

Robert Evans plays the crwth and the six-stringed lyre, while Mary-Anne Roberts sings with a distinctive rather buzzing style. They use Pythagorean tuning. Their interpretation of the older music is based on Evans's research on the Robert ap Huw Manuscript in the British Library.

The pair released a self-published album, Kaingk, on 30 November 2005. Various tracks from the album have received airplay by BBC Radio 3 during their Late Junction programme.
