= Robert ap Huw =

Welsh musician (c. 1580–1665)

Robert ap Huw (or Hugh; c.1580 – 1665), was a Welsh harpist and music copyist. He is most notable for compiling a manuscript, now known as the Robert ap Huw manuscript, which is the main extant source of cerdd dant and is a late medieval collection of harp music. It is one of the most important sources of early Welsh music.

== Life history ==
Robert ap Huw was born circa 1580, growing up in the settlement of Llanddeusant on the island of Anglesey. The grandson of the poet Sion Brwynog, Robert was related to the Tudors of Penmynydd. In his later life he moved to Llandegfan where he became a gentleman farmer. He was an able poet, but was best known as a harpist, having graduated pencerdd (chief musician) by c. 1615.

== The Robert ap Huw Manuscript ==
Around 1613, Robert ap Huw compiled a retrospective manuscript of harp music, the only reliable source of cerdd dant to survive. The compositions within the manuscript include 31 in tablature notation which are supplemented by a series of exercises on the 'twenty-four measures' of cerdd dant. The compositions all date from between 1340 and 1500, and have clear associations with the eisteddfod repertory mentioned by Gruffudd ap Cynan.

During the 18th century the manuscript came into the possession of Welsh poet and antiquary Lewis Morris. Morris had the manuscript bound with extra leaves added to the front and back, to which he added his own notes on the antiquities of Welsh music. Upon Morris' death in 1765 the manuscript passed to his brother Richard, who at one stage lent the work to the noted Welsh harpist John Parry. The manuscript eventually found itself in the ownership of the London Welsh School, whose Governors presented it to the British Museum in 1844.

The manuscript continues to be held by the British Library, and is designated Additional MS. 14905. It is recognised as one of the key sources of early Welsh music.

=== Modern attempts to revive Welsh bardic music ===
Modern attempts to revive Welsh bardic music, with reference to the manuscript, are led by the musical ensemble Bragod and harpist Bill Taylor.

== Bibliography ==
- Davies, John; Jenkins, Nigel; Menna, Baines; Lynch, Peredur I., eds. (2008). The Welsh Academy Encyclopaedia of Wales. Cardiff: University of Wales Press. ISBN 978-0-7083-1953-6.
