= Noson Lawen (disambiguation) =

Noson Lawen a Welsh language-phrase for a party with music.

Noson Lawen may also refer to:

- Noson Lawen (film), 1949
- Noson Lawen (TV series), from 1982
- Noson Lawen Partners, owner of Rasmussen Reports LLC
