= Triawd y Coleg =

Welsh close harmony group

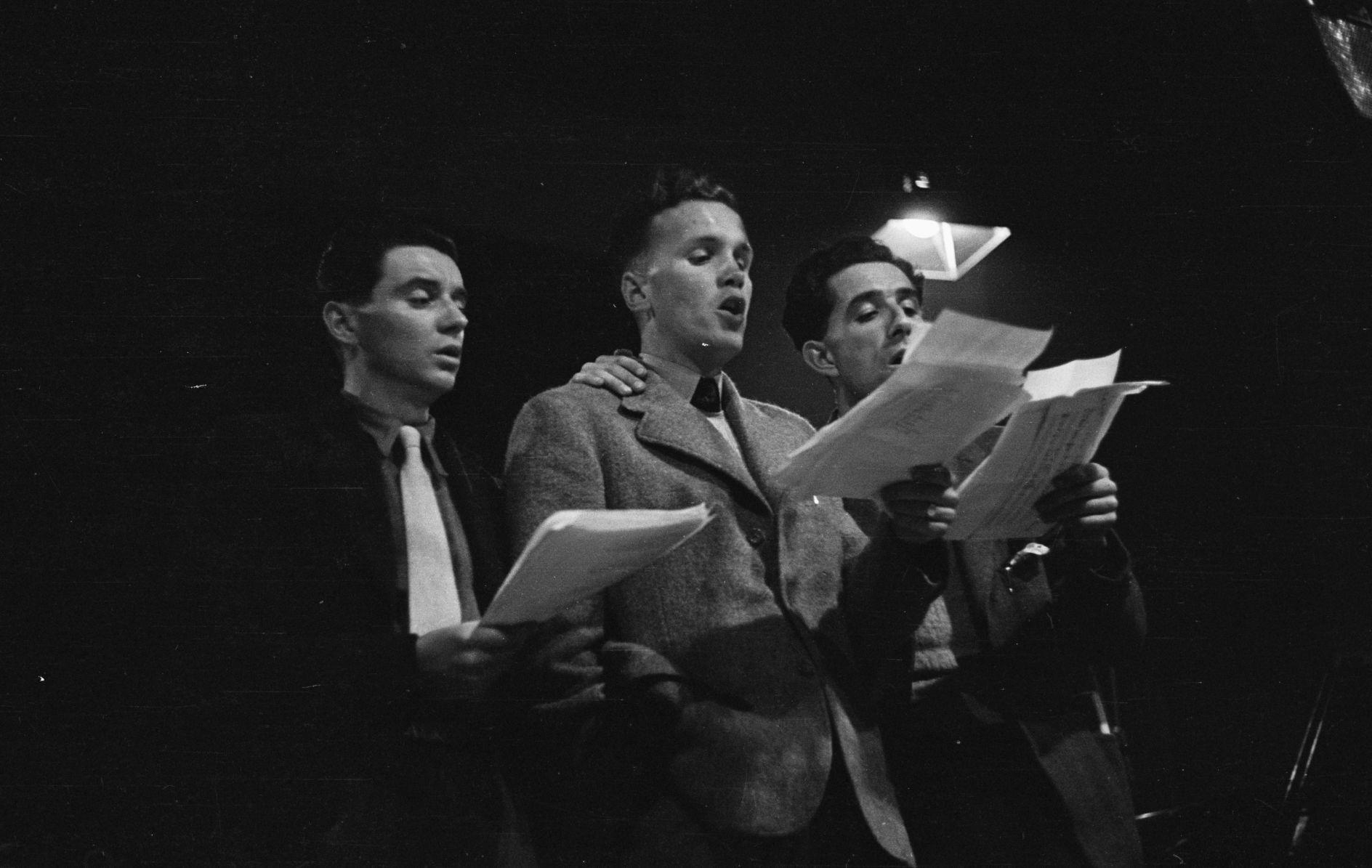
- Triawd y Coleg in 1947. From left: Robin Williams, Cledwyn Jones, Meredydd Evans

Background information
- Origin: Bangor, Wales
- Genres: Close harmony, light music, Welsh folk music
- Years active: 1945–1996
- Labels: Decca, Welsh Teldisc, Sain
- Past members: Meredydd Evans; Cledwyn Jones; Robin Williams

Triawd y Coleg (the College Trio) were a Welsh close harmony group formed at University College of North Wales, Bangor in 1945 and comprising Meredydd Evans, Cledwyn Jones and Robin Williams. The trio achieved national fame as regulars on the Welsh language light entertainment radio programme Noson Lawen in the 1940s, and have been described as "perhaps the first Welsh-language pop group".

== History ==
The group formed in 1945 whilst the three members, Meredydd Evans (colloquially known as Merêd), Cledwyn Jones and Robin Williams, were students at the University College of North Wales, Bangor. The trio became a popular act on stage, performing songs written mainly by Meredydd Evans including "Triawd y Buarth" (The Farmyard Trio). Evans used a folk music sensibility for the group's repertoire, composing original songs but often borrowing elements from popular pieces and adapting existing songs from a variety of sources. The arrangements were generally sparse, with the group's close harmony singing accompanied only by piano.

Triawd y Coleg's performances brought them to the attention of BBC producer Sam Jones, who recruited them to be the stars of the Welsh-language light entertainment radio programme Noson Lawen. Broadcast monthly from Bangor, each edition of the show was bookended by performances by the group; they were nurtured by Jones, who was known to lock Evans in a room until he produced words for a tune. Noson Lawen brought Triawd y Coleg's humorous and sentimental songs to audiences across Wales and made them household names. At one point it was estimated that 20% of the Welsh population listened to the programme. Triawd y Coleg were the first musical performers in the Welsh-language achieve fame through the medium of radio and they have been credited by writer Sarah Hill for "creating in effect a Welsh popular culture from the ground up". Reflecting in 2010, Evans considered the group's light-hearted songs to have resonated with audiences due to the recent Second World War, commenting "people were wanting a bit of fun, and throughout the war there was hardly any Welsh fun on the radio."

One of the group's best-known songs is "Triawd y Buarth" (The Farmyard Trio), in which Robin imitates a cow ("Mw-mw"), Cledwyn a sheep ("Me-me") and Merêd a duck ("Cwac-cwac"). Other popular songs include "Pictiwrs Bach y Borth" (Little Pictures of Borth), "Mari Jen" (Mary Jane) and "Hen Feic Peni-Ffardding fy Nhaid" (My Grandfather's Old Penny-farthing Bike). They performed at the National Eisteddfod of Wales in 1947 and starred in a short film based upon Noson Lawen in 1950.

The group recorded some singles for Decca Records in the late 1940s and early 1950s, but they broke up in June 1952 when Evans moved to America to enrol at Princeton University in 1952. They briefly reunited to record a special radio programme, "Croeso'n Ol", in August 1955 when Evans and his wife Phyllis Kinney made a trip back to Wales before Evans took up his appointment at Boston University. A further holiday in August 1957 allowed Evans to record a short new series of Noson Lawen programmes and a television appearance with the group. The group reconvened again when Evans and Kinney returned to Wales for good in 1960 and recorded a series of singles and EPs for Welsh Teldisc. They performed at the National Eisteddfod once more in 1971. In 1973, Sain released two albums by the group – Noson Lawen, a reunion performance of the BBC programme, and Triawd y Coleg, featuring new studio recordings of some of their repertoire. The group continued to perform sporadically into the 1990s. They made a filmed performance in Bodedern in 1983 and were part of the final BBC radio show recorded at Bangor's Penrhyn Hall in 1984. In 1996, the group appeared in the first episode of S4C's nostalgia series Mond Fell Ddoe.

Robin Williams later became a Presbyterian preacher and broadcaster. He died in 2003, aged 80. Meredydd Evans influenced "almost every sphere of Welsh cultural life, from folk music and philosophy to broadcasting and language politics", according to journalist Meic Stephens. A leading historian and performer of Welsh folk music and Head of Light Entertainment at BBC Wales between 1963 and 1973, he died aged 95 in 2015. Cledwyn Jones, who later taught Religious Education at Friars School, Bangor and was involved with the charity Headway, died in 2022, aged 99.

Triawd y Coleg are considered highly influential on the development of Welsh-language popular music and light entertainment. They have been described as "perhaps the first Welsh-language pop group" and several later Welsh groups followed their model of close harmony arrangements of traditional or comic songs, with comedic routines between them. In 2009, Sain released a compilation album, Goreuon Triawd y Coleg (Best of Triawd y Coleg).

== Excerpts ==
Hen Feic Peni-Ffardding fy Nhaid
Mari Jen
Pictiwrs Bach y Borth
Teganau
Triawd y Buarth
