= Meredydd Evans =

Welsh musical artist (1919–2015)

Background information
- Born: 9 December 1919; Llanegryn, Merionethshire, Wales
- Died: 21 February 2015 (aged 95)
- Genres: Welsh folk music, traditional
- Occupations: Singer, television producer, academic professor, activist
- Spouse: Phyllis Kinney (m. 1948)

Meredydd Evans (9 December 1919 – 21 February 2015), known colloquially as Merêd, was a collector, editor, historian and performer of folk music of Wales. A major figure in Welsh media for over half a century, Evans has been described as influencing "almost every sphere of Welsh cultural life, from folk music and philosophy to broadcasting and language politics".

Evans first found prominence as a member of the popular singing group Triawd y Coleg, writing original material for the group as well as adapting existing songs into Welsh. A light tenor, his success as a performer on BBC Radio earned him the nickname "the Bangor Bing". Beginning in the 1950s, Evans made award-winning Welsh language recordings and published collections and research in collaboration with his American-born wife Phyllis Kinney, helping to preserve and promote Welsh music worldwide. Evans served as Head of Light Entertainment at BBC Wales between 1963 and 1973; in this role, he has been credited with discovering performers including Meic Stevens and Ryan Davies. He was a leading campaigner for Welsh language rights, taking part in acts of non-violent civil disobedience in later life. The archives of Evans and Kinney are now part of the Welsh Music Archive at the National Library of Wales.

== Early life ==
I maintain my Christian beliefs more than ever with these wars which occur today. The creation of the atomic bomb and weapons like that mean you wouldn't have a world war, but global destruction. There's nothing that could justify that.

I know there are people who believe in war as a way to sort out problems, that it's the best choice of a bad lot, and I respect their opinion. They have the right to believe it, but I can't agree.

— Meredydd Evans, 2009

Born in Llanegryn in Merionethshire, Evans was brought up in Tanygrisiau. He was the youngest of eleven children born to Charlotte Evans (née Pugh, 1881–1965) and her husband Richard Evans (1867–1936). Richard, a socialist and engineer, worked at the Foel granite quarry whilst Charlotte fostered a cultured homelife, encouraging her children to read widely and singing to them, giving Evans his first exposure to Welsh folk songs. When Evans was fourteen, he left school after his father became too ill to work and supported his family with a job at the Co-op, where he stayed for seven years. Richard Evans died from silicosis in 1936, when his youngest son was sixteen.

From 1938, Evans harboured an interest in becoming a Calvinistic Methodist minister and began to preach locally. By this period, Evans had become a pacifist and a member of the Fellowship of Reconciliation. In 1939, Evans registered as a conscientious objector a few months before the Second World War began. He subsequently faced a tribunal to claim this status and was given unconditional exemption from military service on religious grounds in early 1940. Evans remained a lifelong advocate of nonviolence. In September 1940, Evans enrolled at Clwyd College, Rhyl to undertake a preparatory course for the ministry. The following year, his training continued at the University College of North Wales, Bangor. In September 1943, he decided to leave the course and instead took a course in Philosophy. He graduated with a first in 1945, and was President of the Student Council in 1946-7.

== Career ==
=== Triawd y Coleg ===
Excerpt of Triawd y Coleg's "Triawd y Buarth"

Evans' interest in Welsh music developed during his studies at Bangor, under the influence of Mrs. Enid Parry. He began a career as a solo folk singer and also formed a close harmony group, Triawd y Coleg, with Cledwyn Jones and Robin Williams. The trio became a popular act on stage, performing songs written mainly by Evans including "Triawd y Buarth" (The Farmyard Trio). (Note: Merêd performed the "cwac cwac" in the chorus.) After coming to the attention of BBC producer Sam Jones, Triawd y Coleg were recruited to be the stars of the Welsh-language light entertainment radio programme Noson Lawen. Broadcast monthly from Bangor, each edition of the show was bookended by performances by the group; they were nurtured by Jones, who was known to lock Evans in a room until he produced words for a tune. Noson Lawen brought Triawd y Coleg's humorous and sentimental songs to audiences across Wales and made them household names. At one point it was estimated that 20% of the Welsh population listened to the programme. The group were the first musical performers in the Welsh-language achieve fame through the medium of radio, and their success made Evans a household name. Triawd y Coleg starred in a short film based upon the programme in 1950, with Evans playing a farmer's son who dreams of greater things. During the 1960s, Triawd y Coleg recorded a series of singles and EPs for Welsh Teldisc and, in the 1970s, made two albums for Sain. They made two appearances at the National Eisteddfod of Wales (in 1947 and 1971) and continued to perform sporadically into the 1990s.

=== Academia, recording and television ===
Excerpt of Evans performing the plygain carol "Ar Gyfer Heddiw'r Bore"

Evans was appointed Tutor in Philosophy and Political Theory at Coleg Harlech in 1947. In March of that year, he met Phyllis Kinney (1922−2026), an American singer, whilst she was touring as lead solo with the Carl Rosa Opera Company in the UK. Kinney had studied at the Juilliard School and introduced Evans to folk music from around the world. They married on 10 April 1948 and had a daughter, Eluned, in 1949.

By the late 1940s, Evans was a regular presence on Welsh radio, both as a presenter and a performer. He became known for his duets with Kinney as well as his work as part of Triawd y Coleg. He possessed a light tenor, described by journalist Constance Hale as "at once clear and enveloping, haunting and reassuring". His singing style earned him the nickname "the Welsh Bing", to his chagrin. (Note: Alternatively, "the Bangor Bing".) In 2015, Sain co-founder Huw Jones described Evans as the "first star of the Welsh pop singing world".

Evans left Coleg Harlech in 1950 and joined Hughes and Son's editorial staff in Oswestry as an assistant editor for the Welsh newspaper Y Cymro. In June 1952, Evans and his family moved to America where he enrolled at Princeton University, undertaking on a PhD in Philosophy. He was awarded his doctorate in 1955. Whilst studying at Princeton, Evans received a letter from Moe Asch, founder of Folkways Records, who was curious to hear Welsh folk songs. Evans recorded an improvised selection of secular Welsh language songs for Asch, all a capella, in what he thought was a test recording. To Evans' surprise, Asch issued the recordings as an album; The New York Times named Welsh Folk-Songs one of the twelve best popular light music records of 1954. The album was reviewed in DownBeat, who wrote "the darkly moving language of Wales is sung beautifully by Meredydd Evans". From 1955 to 1960, Evans taught at Boston University, where in 1957 the students voted him Professor of the Year. During this time, he met Albert Einstein, Arthur Miller and Marilyn Monroe. During his time in America, Evans was active in promoting Welsh music in the country, taking part in Gymanfa Ganu festivals, giving addresses and performing concerts, often with Kinney.

After returning to Wales in 1960, Evans was appointed to succeed Cynan in the Department of Extramural Studies at Bangor. With Kinney, he edited three collections of Welsh songs described as "definitive reference-works for this genre of national song." In 1962, Evans recorded a new album, A Concert of Welsh Songs, with Kinney, the Russian harpist Maria Korchinska and several backing musicians and singers conducted and arranged by Robert Docker. Kinney later described the album, Evans' first to use instrumental backing, as "tradition dressed up to suit the audience". Evans later composed music to Harri Webb's patriotic poem "Colli Iaith" (Losing a Language), which has achieved the status of a traditional air. In 1976, Sain released Merêd, a new album of 28 traditional Welsh folk songs sequenced by theme and introduced by musicologist D. Roy Saer.

In 1963, Evans became Head of Light Entertainment at BBC Wales. He initially found the role challenging and almost gave up after the first year, telling S4C in 2014; "I realised immediately it would be an uphill struggle. A Welsh-language tradition didn't exist in vaudeville, music hall or cabaret." As head, Evans produced numerous popular television programmes including Fo a Fe, Ryan a Ronnie, Disc a Dawn, Lloffa and Hob y Deri Dando. He has been credited with identifying talents including Meic Stevens and Ryan Davies during his tenure. Evans unsuccessfully applied for the post of Head of Programmes in 1969, and left his role as Head of Light Entertainment in 1973. He then joined the Department of Extramural Studies at Cardiff University, where he was responsible for Welsh-language provision until his retirement in 1985. In 1973, Evans established Y Dinesydd, a Welsh-language newspaper for Cardiff and a forerunner for future papurau bro.

In the 1970s, Evans and Kinney settled in Cwmystwyth, where they contributed to the community and taught Welsh to many of their neighbours; according to biographer R. Arwel Jones, the couple's home became "a magnet for people of all ages, from all over Wales and the world who would flock there to enjoy their company and to benefit from the couple's intellectual generosity". Their home's proximity to the National Library of Wales, Aberystwyth allowed the couple to devote their retirement to studying the history of folk songs and tunes; their research appeared regularly in Canu Gwerin, the journal of the Welsh Folk Song Society. In April 2007, the University of Wales published a Festschrift volume for Evans and Kinney, "a fully bilingual collection of critical essays on various aspects of Welsh song and traditional music by Wales’ leading experts and musicologists" to celebrate their contribution "not only to Welsh traditional music but to the very culture and language of Wales." Evans' early interest in philosophy continued; in 1984, he published an acclaimed study of the Scottish Enlightenment philosopher David Hume. He was elected president of the philosophy branch of the University of Wales Guild of Graduates in 2007, and honorary president in 2012. Evans would occasionally write poetry, often for the annual Cwrdd Bach (Literary Meeting) in Cwmystwyth.

=== Political activism ===
I saw myself that you have to struggle consciously for your identity. Not because you're better than anybody else, or because your culture is any more great. It just happens to be yours, and you make sense of your life in terms of that culture.

— Meredydd Evans, 2008

Evans left the Labour Party and joined Plaid Cymru in 1960. He later became a senior figure in Cymdeithas yr Iaith Gymraeg (the Welsh Language Society) and was a lifelong advocate of non-violent revolutionary means to promote the interests of Welsh speakers. Evans' support for the society's sometimes controversial campaigns "almost certainly cost him the job of controller of BBC Wales", a role he was widely tipped for, according to the journalist Meic Stephens. On 11 October 1979, Evans, with two fellow academics, Ned Thomas and Pennar Davies, broke into the Pencarreg television transmitter as part of a campaign of civil disobedience in protest designed to pressure Margaret Thatcher's administration into fulfilling their pre-election promise to establish a Welsh language television channel. The three were found guilty at Carmarthen Crown Court of illegally switching off the transmitter, but the campaign has been widely credited as contributing to the 1982 launch of the Welsh language broadcasting service S4C.

In a controversial 1986 speech at the National Eisteddfod of Wales, Evans attacked central and local government for ignoring the cultural effects of large-scale inward migration of monoglot English-speakers into rural areas in Wales. In 1993, he entered Carmarthen Crown Court with several other prominent Welsh figures and destroyed the judge's chair in an ultimately successful campaign for a new Welsh Language Act. In 1999, Evans appeared in court after refusing to pay his TV licence, stating there had been a decrease in the amount of Welsh broadcasting over the proceeding decade. He was prepared to face imprisonment, but the fine was paid on his behalf by friends who were concerned about his health. From 1998, Evans spearheaded the campaign to establish the Coleg Cymraeg Cenedlaethol. When it was finally set up in 2011, Evans was named President of Cyfeillion y Coleg (Friends of the Coleg) and given an Honorary Fellowship at the Coleg's inaugural Annual Meeting in Swansea. In March 2014, Evans was quoted as backing further peaceful demonstrations by Cymdeithas yr Iaith Gymraeg following protests in Aberystwyth.

== Later life ==
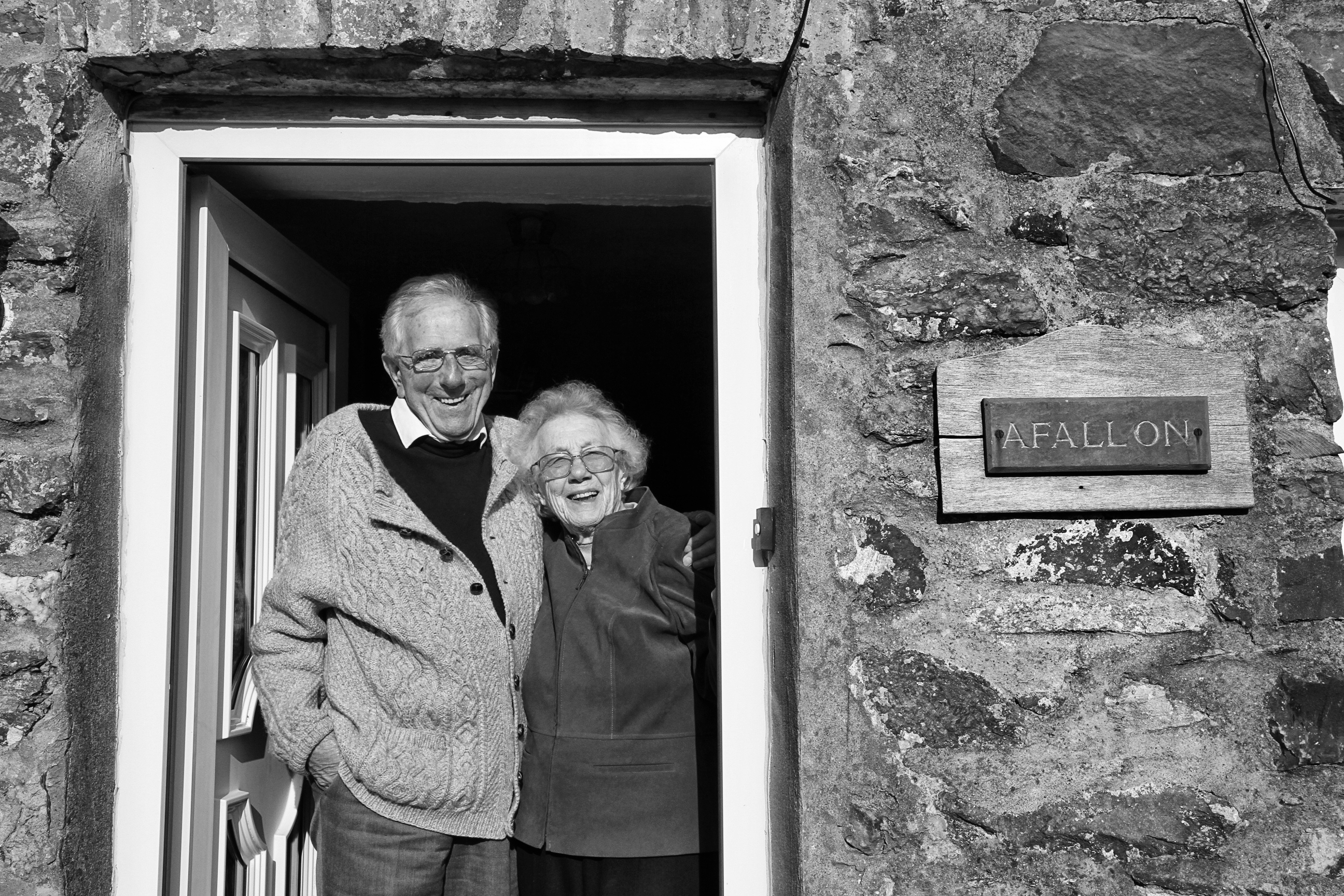
Evans and Kinney in 2012

Evans had a lapse of faith in later life, considering himself agnostic for a period.

Despite a throat operation, Evans continued to sing in his old age. His final recording, "Cân y Dewis", appears on Gai Toms' album, Bethel (2012). He worked daily in his study until a few months before his death.

Following a stroke, Evans died aged 95 on 21 February 2015. His funeral was attended by hundreds of mourners. Among the tributes, Jamie Bevan of Cymdeithas yr Iaith said "without him, we would not be enjoying some of the gains for the Welsh language, especially the Welsh language channel, S4C, the Welsh Language Act and the Coleg Cymraeg Cenedlaethol." Evans and Kinney donated their archives to the National Library of Wales, where they are now part of the Welsh Music Archive.

== Honours ==
In 2013, Evans was awarded Tywysydd (guide) in the first ever Parêd Gŵyl Dewi Aberystwyth (St David's Day Parade) for his services to Wales and the Welsh language. He was posthumously awarded a Good Tradition Award by the BBC Radio 2 Folk Awards in April 2015 for his contribution to the revival of traditional Welsh songs. In 2019, Evans and Phyllis Kinney were awarded the Welsh Music Prize Inspiration Award. In the same year, Evans was one of 226 contemporary UK figures who died in 2015 inducted into the Oxford Dictionary of National Biography. The Coleg Cymraeg Cenedlaethol awards the Meredydd Evans Memorial Prize (Gwobr Merêd) each year.

== Publications ==
- Hume Gwasg Gee, Denbigh. 1984.
- Merêd: detholiad o ysgrifau Dr. Meredydd Evans (eds Geraint Huw Jenkins, Ann Ffrancon), Gomer, Llandysul, 1994.
- Canu'r Cymry Volumes 1&2. Welsh Folk Songs. Welsh Folk-Song Society.

== Discography ==
=== Solo ===
- Welsh Folk-Songs (Folkways, 1954)
- A Concert of Welsh Songs (Delysé, 1962)
- Merêd (Sain, 1976)

=== with Triawd y Coleg ===
- Triawd y Coleg (Sain, 1973)
- Y Noson Lawen (Sain, 1973)
