= Phyllis Kinney =

American singer and author (1922–2026)

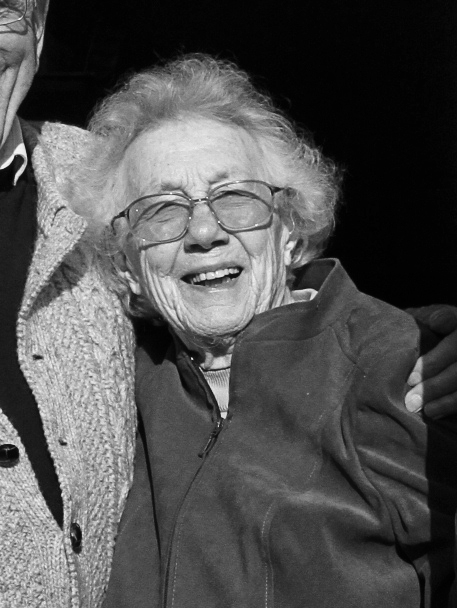
- Kinney in 2012
- Born: July 4, 1922; Pontiac, Michigan, U.S.
- Died: June 29, 2026 (aged 103)
- Education: Juilliard School
- Occupations: Singer, musicologist
- Spouse: Meredydd Evans (m. 1948; died 2015)
- Children: 1
- Writing career
- Notable works: Canu'r Cymry; Welsh Traditional Music

Phyllis Kinney (July 4, 1922 – June 29, 2026) was an American and Welsh singer, collector and historian who was a leading authority on Welsh folk music. She studied at the Juilliard School and was a soprano with the Carl Rosa Opera Company during the 1940s. After meeting her husband Meredydd Evans, Kinney immersed herself in the culture of Wales. Through her writing, research and performances, Kinney helped to preserve and promote traditional music of Wales. The archives of Kinney and Evans are now part of the Welsh Music Archive at the National Library of Wales.

== Life and career ==
Kinney was born in Pontiac, Michigan, on July 4, 1922. After completing her education at Pontiac High School, Kinney enrolled at Michigan State College in East Lansing. There, she was tutored in music by Gomer Llewelyn Jones, a Welshman who had moved to America in 1934. Jones sparked an interest in Welsh music in Kinney, who later said she had "hardly heard of Wales" before meeting him. By 1942, Kinney was giving public performances of Welsh songs, assisted by Jones at the piano. Jones considered her soprano renditions to bring "a vivid understanding of the character of the Welsh people" to audiences in Michigan. Kinney graduated in 1943 and secured a fellowship at the Juilliard School in New York City.

In 1947, Kinney became lead solo with the Carl Rosa Opera Company. With the company, she toured the UK in March of that year. During a stop in Bangor, Wales, Kinney met Meredydd Evans, a Welsh folk musician who was a member of the popular close harmony group Triawd y Coleg. Kinney learnt to speak, read and write Welsh, and introduced Evans to folk music from around the world. The couple married on April 10, 1948, and had a daughter, Eluned, in 1949.

Like Evans, Kinney began to work for the BBC, often performing duets with her husband. Kinney sang in "impeccable Welsh, which had a delightful American burr occasionally", according to the Western Mail. In June 1952, the family moved to America, where Evans enrolled at Princeton University. In 1960, the family moved back to Wales, where they settled. With Evans, Kinney edited collections of Welsh songs described as "definitive reference-works for this genre of national song." In 1962, Kinney provided operatic vocal accompaniment on Evans' album A Concert of Welsh Songs, with backing by the Russian harpist Maria Korchinska and several musicians and singers conducted and arranged by Robert Docker. Kinney later described the album, Evans' first to use instrumental backing, as "tradition dressed up to suit the audience".

In the 1980s, Kinney and Evans settled in Cwmystwyth, where they contributed to the community and taught Welsh to a host of their non-Welsh-speaking neighbours; according to biographer R. Arwel Jones, the couple's home became "a magnet for people of all ages, from all over Wales and the world who would flock there to enjoy their company and to benefit from the couple's intellectual generosity". Their home's proximity to the National Library of Wales, Aberystwyth allowed the couple to devote their retirement to studying the history of folk songs and tunes, and their research appeared regularly in Canu Gwerin, the journal of the Welsh Folk Song Society. Kinney was awarded an honorary M Mus degree by the University of Wales in 1991 and became honorary fellow of Bangor University alongside her husband in 1997. In April 2007, the University of Wales published a Festschrift volume for Evans and Kinney, "a fully bilingual collection of critical essays on various aspects of Welsh song and traditional music by Wales' leading experts and musicologists" to celebrate their contribution "not only to Welsh traditional music but to the very culture and language of Wales."

Being Welsh is like belonging to an exclusive club without membership. I can appreciate why Welshmen want to preserve their language. It's a beautiful, imaginative language.

— Phyllis Kinney, 1964

In 2011, University of Wales Press published Kinney's final book to date, Welsh Traditional Music, an extensive history and analysis of the instrumental and vocal traditions of Wales.

Meredydd Evans died aged 95 in 2015; he and Kinney had arranged to donate their archives to the National Library of Wales, where they subsequently became part of the Welsh Music Archive. In 2019, the couple was awarded the Welsh Music Prize Inspiration Award.

Kinney turned 100 on July 4, 2022. On that date, the National Library hosted Phyllis Kinney: 100, an event featuring her daughter Eluned and harpist Elinor Bennett, to celebrate the centenary. She died on June 29, 2026, at the age of 103.

== Publications ==
- Canu'r Cymry
- Canu'r Cymry II
- Caneuon Chwarae 1
- Caneuon Chwarae II
- Welsh Traditional Music
