= St Bartholomew's Church, Llanover =

Coordinates: 51.7793°N 2.99°W

St Bartholomew's Church, Llanover, Monmouthshire
- Church of St Bartholomew
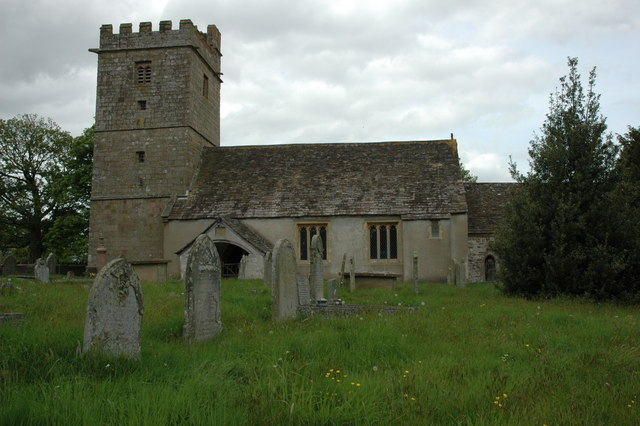
- The nave and tower

- Location in Monmouthshire
- Location: Llanover, Monmouthshire
- Country: Wales
- Denomination: Church in Wales

History
- Status: Parish church
- Founded: Norman

Architecture
- Functional status: Active
- Heritage designation: Grade II*
- Designated: 9 January 1956
- Architectural type: Perpendicular

Administration
- Diocese: Monmouth
- Archdeaconry: Monmouth
- Deanery: Heart of Monmouthshire
- Parish: Heart of Monmouthshire

Clergy
- Rector: Rev'd Canon Sally Ingle-Gillis

The Church of St Bartholomew, Llanover, Monmouthshire is a parish church with its origins in the period following the Norman Conquest. The nave appears the earliest part of the present building, with the chancel dating from the 14th century, the tower from the 16th century and the porch from the 18th century. After a limited Victorian restoration in the middle of the 19th century, the church has been essentially unchanged. It is a Grade II* listed building.

== History ==
The church sits just north of the village of Llanover, close to the River Usk. The nave is considered to be Norman in origin. The chancel dates from the 14th century, stylistically, and the porch has a date stone of 1750. The building was lightly restored in the Victorian period and has been little altered since that time. It remains an active parish church.

== Architecture and description ==
The church is constructed of Old Red Sandstone. The style is Perpendicular. The interior contains a Royal coat of arms which the architectural historian John Newman described as "painted with much panache, the heraldic shield leaning rakishly between an excitable lion and unicorn". The churchyard contains the tomb of Benjamin Hall, 1st Baron Llanover, dated 1868.

The church is a Grade II* listed building.
