= HD 218566 =

Star in the constellation Pisces

HD 218566 / Ebla
Observation data Epoch J2000 Equinox ICRS
- Constellation: Pisces
- Right ascension: 23^{h} 09^{m} 10.72701^{s}
- Declination: −02° 15′ 38.6854″
- Apparent magnitude (V): 8.628

Characteristics
- Spectral type: K3 V
- B−V color index: 1.014

Astrometry
Radial velocity (R_{v})	−37.800±0.0029 km/s
Proper motion (μ)	RA: +631.520 mas/yr Dec.: −97.214 mas/yr
Parallax (π)	34.6603±0.0511 mas
Distance	94.1 ± 0.1 ly (28.85 ± 0.04 pc)
Absolute magnitude (M_{V})	6.187

Details
Mass	0.81±0.06 M_{☉}
Radius	0.86±0.08 R_{☉}
Luminosity	0.353±0.032 L_{☉}
Surface gravity (log g)	4.48±0.04 cgs
Temperature	4,849±42 K
Metallicity [Fe/H]	0.38 dex
Rotational velocity (v sin i)	0.0 km/s
Age	8.5 to 11.5 Gyr

Other designations
- Ebla, BD−03°5577, HD 218566, HIP 114322, SAO 146533

Database references
SIMBAD	data

HD 218566 is a star in the equatorial zodiac constellation of Pisces. It has the proper name Ebla, after a kingdom in ancient Syria. With an apparent visual magnitude of 8.6, this ninth magnitude star can not be viewed with the naked eye. However, it can be readily seen even with a small telescope. It is located at a distance of 94 light years from the Sun based on parallax, but is drifting closer with a radial velocity of −37.8 km/s. The star hosts one known exoplanet, HD 218566 b.

== Nomenclature ==
The name Ebla was selected in the NameExoWorlds campaign by Syria, during the 100th anniversary of the IAU. Ebla was one of the earliest kingdoms in Syria. At this time, the planet HD 218566 b was named Ugarit. Ugarit was a city where its scribes devised the Ugaritic alphabet around 1400 B.C.

== Stellar properties ==
HD 218566 is a smaller star than the Sun, with about 81% of the Sun's mass and 86% of the radius of the Sun. It is a K-type main sequence star with a stellar classification of K3 V that is generating energy by the nuclear fusion of hydrogen at its core. HD 218556 is radiating around 35% of the luminosity of the Sun from its outer envelope at an effective temperature of 4,849 K. This heat gives the star the characteristic orange-hued glow of a K-type star.

Compared to the Sun, this star has an unusually high abundance of elements other than hydrogen and helium, what astronomers term the metallicity. Based upon the abundance of iron, the metallicity is 2.4 times as high as in the Sun. It is much older than the Sun, with estimates of its age ranging from 8.5 to 11.5 billion years. It appears to have a negligible rate of spin as its projected rotational velocity is too small to measure.

This star belongs to the thick disk population of the Milky Way. In the galactic coordinate system, it has space velocity components of [U, V, W] = [77, −61, −8] km/s. HD 218556 is following an orbit through the galaxy with an eccentricity of 0.36±0.01 that carries it as close as 14.3 kly (4.4 kpc) and as far as 30.3 kly (9.3 kpc) from the Galactic Center. The orbital tilt carries this star as much as 0.6 kly (0.18 kpc) from the galactic plane.

== Planetary system ==
Based upon high resolution measurements performed at the W. M. Keck Observatory and analysis performed upon these measurements by amateur astronomer Peter Jalowiczor, HD 218566 shows cyclical variations in radial velocity that suggest gravitational perturbation by orbiting companion. This candidate object is estimated to be orbiting the parent star with a period of 225.7±0.4 days at an eccentricity of 0.3±0.1. The semi-major axis for this Keplerian orbit is an estimated 0.6873 astronomical units. Because the inclination of the orbit remains unknown, the mass of this companion has not been determined. However, it can be constrained to have a mass of at least 21% the mass of Jupiter. There is no evidence of additional companions in the system.

The HD 218566 planetary system
Companion (in order from star)	Mass	Semimajor axis (AU)	Orbital period (days)	Eccentricity	Inclination (°)	Radius
b / Ugarit	≥0.198±0.018 M_{J}	0.6875+0.0081 −0.0084	225.17+0.42 −0.52	0.270+0.100 −0.095	—	—
