= David Hughes (Eos Iâl) =

Welsh poet and publisher

David Hughes (c. 1794 - 2 March 1862), known by his bardic name of Eos Iâl, was a Welsh poet and publisher. Hughes is known as the author of the plygain carol Ar Gyfer Heddiw'r Bore.

== Early life ==
Hughes was born in around 1794, probably at "Brynllwynog", Bryneglwys near Corwen, Denbighshire. In the 1820s he moved a few miles away to Cynwyd, in the parish of Llangar. He married twice and fathered eight children. He lived in "Nhŷ yr Ardd", Pentre, a hamlet near Bryneglwys. Fond of alcohol when a young man, he was subsequently drawn to the evangelical temperance movement, becoming one of its leaders as well as an Oddfellow and a member of the Baptist church, firstly at Cynwyd and then at Llansantffraid Glyn Dyfrdwy, where, dying aged 67, he was buried.

== Poet ==
In 1824 he won an Eisteddfod in Corwen and remained a competitor until 1835. In 1839 he published a volume of verse which proved highly popular. Bob Owen, Croesor says, of this collection: "Much of its content is of a popular appeal and of ephemeral value." His work critiqued what he regarded as the prevailing social and moral laxity of his day.

== Printing and publishing ==
In 1837 he bought a printing press, producing a small number of books and some songs and carols.

=== Works published ===
- "Ffrwyth y Profiad neu Waedd yn Erbyn Meddwdod" ("The Fruit of Experience or Tirade against Drunkenness") (pamphlet)
- "Araith Beelsebub Tywysog y Fagddu Fawr" ("The Great Prince Beelzebub") (pamphlet)
- "Udgorn y Jubili a'r Gynadledd" ("Trumpet of the Jubilee and Conference") (held by Bangor University Library)

== See also ==
- William Jones (Ehedydd Iâl) (15 August 1815 - 15 February 1899)
