= Marwnad yr Ehedydd =

Traditional Welsh folk song

"Marwnad yr Ehedydd" ("The Lark's Elegy") is a traditional Welsh folk song. A single verse was published by the Welsh Folk Song Society in 1914. It was attributed to the singing of Edward Vaughan, Plas-rhiw-Saeson, collected by Soley Thomas.

== Words with English translation ==
Mi a glywais fod yr 'hedydd
Wedi marw ar y mynydd;
Pe gwyddwn i mai gwir y geiriau,
Awn â gyrr o wyr ac arfau
I gyrchu corff yr hedydd adrau.

I heard that the Lark
Died on the mountain;
If I knew the words were true,
I would take a crowd of armed men
To bring home the Lark's body.

There has been speculation that it is one of the oldest existing songs in Welsh, because the lark in the song may be a coded reference to Owain Glyndŵr and could have been written by one of his followers. The single stanza has been 'exploded' into longer songs at least four times. The first was by Enid Parry, adding three more verses about other birds. Her words were also published in two books of Welsh folksongs.

A second version was written by Albert Evans-Jones (bardic name Cynan), adding four verses again about other birds.

1. Mi a glywais fod yr ’hedydd,
Wedi marw ar y mynydd;
Pe gwyddwn i mai gwir y geiria’,
Awn â gyr o wŷr ac arfa’,
I gyrchu corff yr ’hedydd adra’.

2. Mi a glywais fod yr hebog
Eto’n fynych uwch y fawnog,
A bod ei galon a’i adenydd
Wrth fynd heibio i gorff yr ’hedydd
Yn curo’n llwfr fel calon llofrudd.

3. Mi a glywais fod cornchwiglan
Yn ei ddychryn i ffwrdd o’r siglan
Ac na chaiff, er dianc rhagddi,
Wedi rhusio o dan y drysi,
Ond aderyn y bwn i’w boeni.

4. Mi a glywais gan y wennol
Fod y tylwyth teg yn ’morol
Am arch i’r ’hedydd bach o risial ,
Ac am amdo o'r pren afal,
Ond piti fâi dwyn pob petal.

5. Canys er mynd â byddin arfog
Ac ar codi braw ar yr hebog,
Ac er grisial ac er bloda’,
Er yr holl dylwyth teg a'u donia’,
Ni ddaw cân yr ’hedydd adra’.

1. I heard that the lark
Died on the mountain;
If I knew the words were true,
I would take a crowd of men and arms
To fetch the lark's body home.

2. I heard that the hawk
Is still often above the peatbog,
And that its heart and his wings,
As it passes the lark's body,
Flutter in a cowardly way like a murderer's heart.

3. I heard that a lapwing
Frightens him away from the bog
And that, although he escapes
And hides away in a panic beneath the thicket,
It will only be for the bittern to worry him.

4. The swallow told me
That the fairies were taking care of
A crystal coffin for the little lark
And a shroud from the apple tree,
It would be a pity to take all the petals.

5. Because in spite of the armed men,
And although the hawk was frightened away,
In spite of the crystal and the blossom,
And all the magic of the fairies,
The lark's song will never come home.

This second version was used, for example, by Bryn Terfel on CD, and by Arfon Gwilym for Trac Cymru (Folk Development for Wales).

A slightly modified melody, compared to the original field-recording, is used in some publications and recordings.

In 1979, Myrddin ap Dafydd created a third version of the words, based on the idea of it being about Glyndŵr, for the folk group Plethyn who released it on a cassette entitled 'Blas y Pridd', and subsequently in 1990 on a CD.

During the celebration of the 600th anniversary of Glyndŵr's uprising, Myrddin ap Dafydd wrote a fourth version adding five verses to the original, entitled 'Mawl yr Ehedydd' (The Lark's Eulogy).
