= Arfon Gwilym =

Arfon Gwilym (born 1 September 1950) is a Welsh folksinger, ballad singer, publisher and musician, originally from Rhydymain, between Dolgellau and Bala in Gwynedd. He is also known as a language campaigner through his work over the years promoting plygain singing and cerdd dant.

He came to attention at an event in the Ruthin eisteddfod of 1973 called "Tafodau Tân", singing a selection of traditional songs about Marged ferch Ifan.

He was a reporter for the newspaper Y Cymro for more than ten years and has since settled in the area of Meifod and Llanfyllin in Powys.

== Bibliography ==
- Cerddoriaeth y Cymry: Cyflwyniad i Draddodiad Cerddorol Cymru (Y Lolfa, 2007)
- Cymraeg - a startling revival, Dafydd Iwan and Arfon Gwilym interviewed by Rob Gibson, in Burnett, Ray (ed.), Calgacus 3, Spring 1976, pp. 18 – 21, ISSN 0307-2029
