= Peter Jalowiczor =

British astronomer

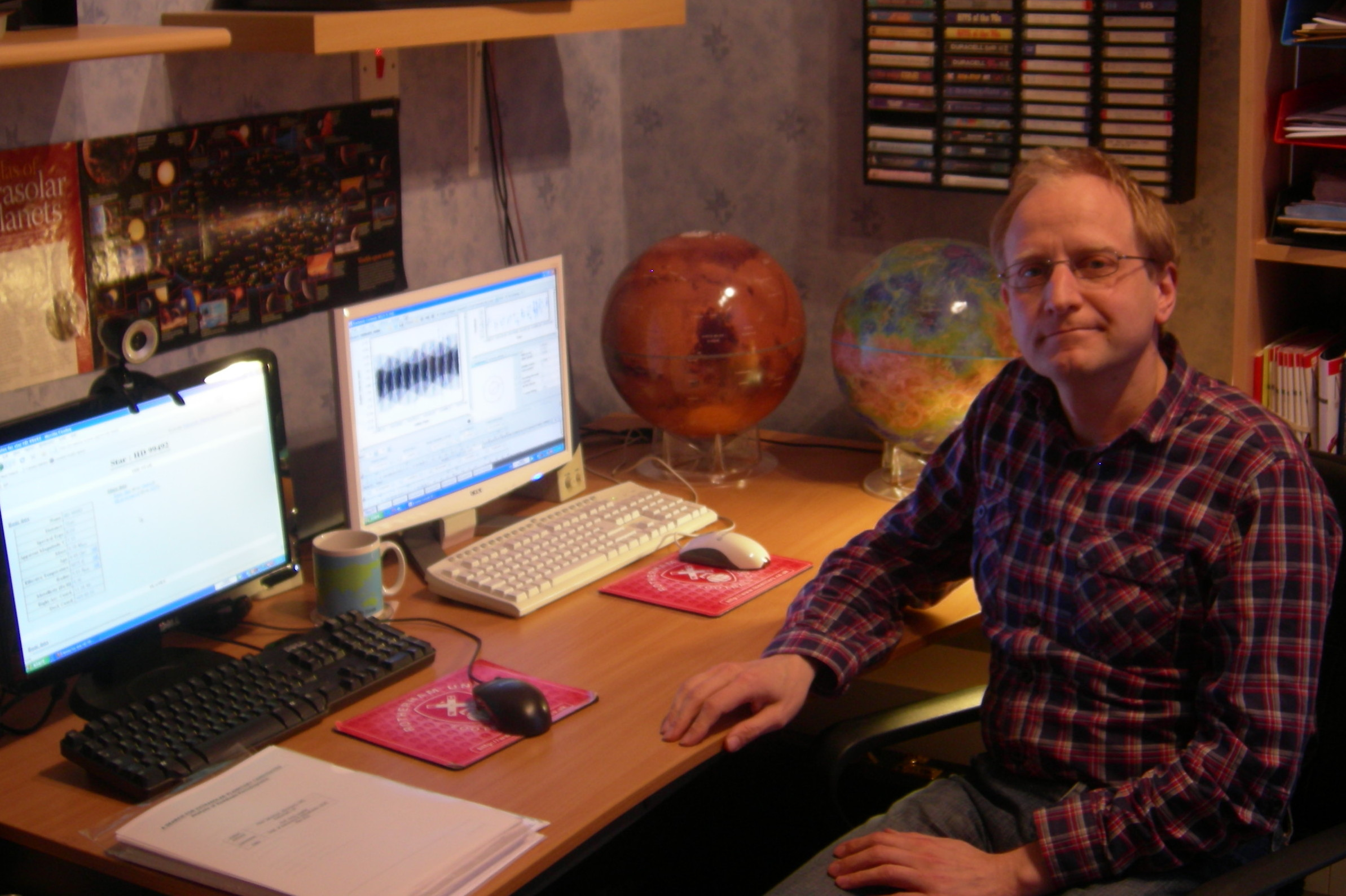
- Peter Jalowiczor in his study (taken 2010) showing PCs set-up for the analysis of extrasolar planetary data.
- Born: 1965 (age 60–61)
- Occupations: Independent scholar astronomer, author
- Known for: Co-discovering four exoplanets – HD 31253b, HD 218566b, HD 177830c and HD 99492c

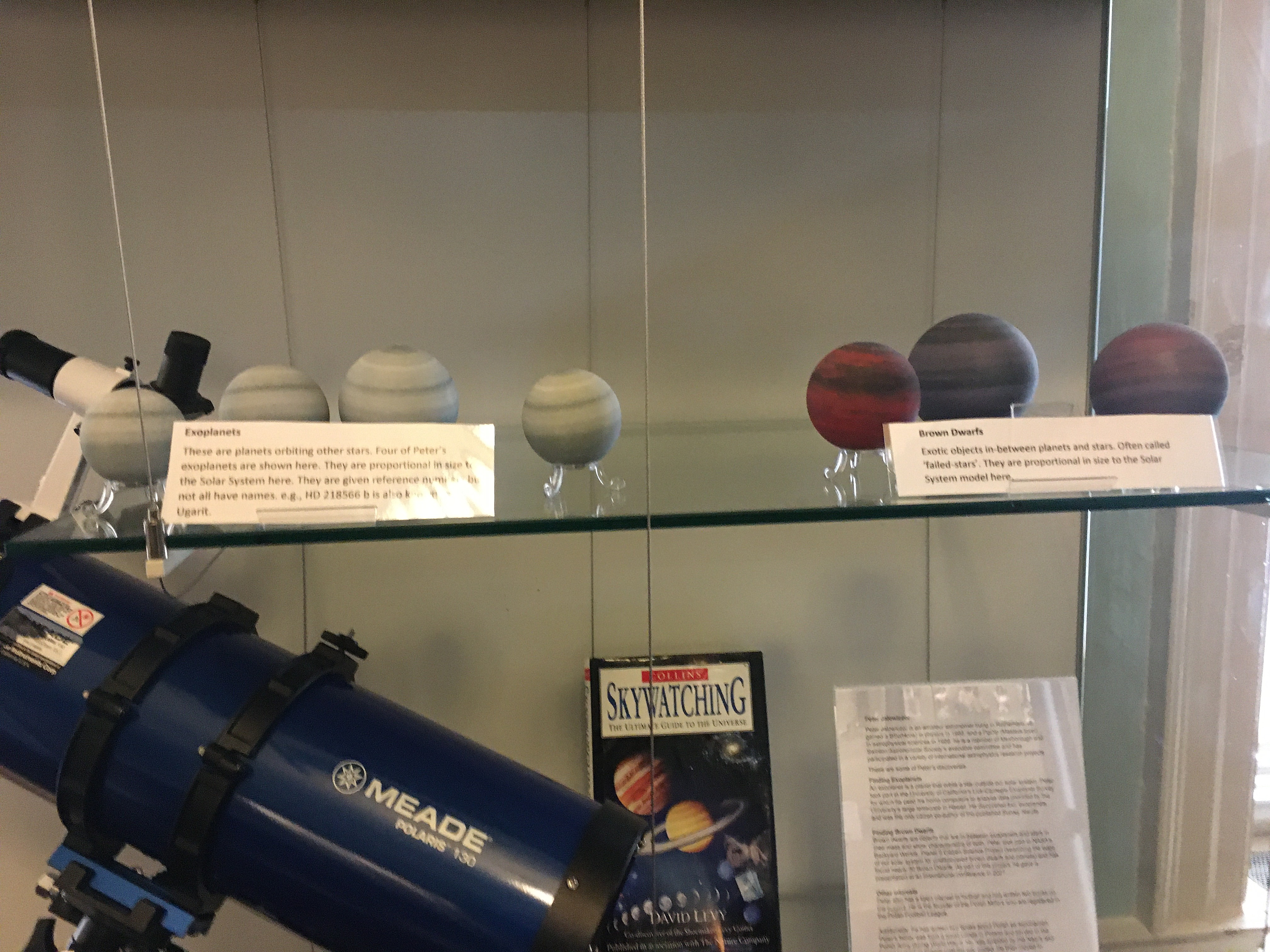
Exoplanet and Brown Dwarf Models displayed at Clifton Park Museum.

Peter Jalowiczor (born 1965) is an independent scholar (astronomer) living in South Yorkshire, in the United Kingdom. Jalowiczor is primarily known for co-discovering four exoplanets at home using data released to the public by the University of California's Lick-Carnegie Planet Search Team and conducted research confirming that $k=2$ for the delta effect for comets. He has written four books – two about football and two about Polish servicemen from World War II. He is also the founder of a football club, the Polish Millers.

== Education and career ==
Jalowiczor is employed in Post-16 education. He has three academic degrees, two of which are from the University of Sheffield. These are a BSc (Hons) in physics from 1988, and a PgDip in astrophysical sciences from 1989. At the University of Sheffield, he did his postgraduate research under Professor David Hughes studying Halley's Comet, which was his work on the delta effect. He also has a PGCE from the University of Huddersfield.

== Research ==
Jalowiczor has taken part in several research projects as an independent scholar, including work with exoplanets, brown dwarfs, comets and Mars. He was a member of South Yorkshire's Mexborough and Swinton Astronomical Society, where he gave several talks on the various research projects volunteered for example on his work with Planet Four, a citizen science project.

Two stars of different size orbiting the center of mass. The spectrum can be seen to split depending on the position and velocity of the stars. Using this same principle, Jalowiczor searched for planets orbiting a star, instead of binary star systems.

=== Finding brown dwarfs, white dwarfs ===
NASA launched their Backyard Worlds: Planet 9 Citizen Science Project in early 2017, under Dr Marc Kuchner. Jalowiczor has been active in this area discovering 25 brown dwarfs. These are also generally mentioned in Marc's Blog post and are expected to be published in a future science journal. Other publications resulting include the identification of WD (White Dwarf) companions to known eclipsing binary systems such as the HP Dra system. This project also resulted in a teleconference team-teach at his old school in 2020 in a NASA-link up. Peter has presented at conferences of the AAS (American Astronomical Society) in 2021 and 2023. From 2022 to 2023 over 18 months, his research was displayed at the Clifton Park Museum in Rotherham.

=== Finding exoplanets ===
The University of California launched the Lick–Carnegie Exoplanet Survey, a search for exo-planets with the method of Doppler spectroscopy, using the ten-meter Keck telescope located in Hawaii. Jalowiczor began his research in 2007, using data on a public server from the survey team, which began uploading its measurements on a public server starting in 2005. Jalowiczor looked for oscillations of stars that could be caused by a nearby planet, alerting the University of California to possible exoplanets. His work did not require a telescope (multiple sources agree that he does not own one), but used only two home computers. He sent around 40 suggestions before the survey team contacted Jalowiczor indicating that they believed he found a potential exoplanet. The University of California confirmed the first discovery, HD177830c, in December 2009, with the next three confirmed later in September 2010. In 2010 the survey published a paper with Jalowiczor which presented the data on the four exoplanets and showed the light graphs used to discover the exoplanets (for an explanation, see figure at right). The four planets discovered from his work are HD 31253b, HD 218566b, HD 177830c and HD 99492c. HD 218566b is within the habitable zone of its solar system. While it is unlikely that it holds extraterrestrial life because it is a gas giant with no solid surface, it is possible that there could be a moon circling it which could sustain life. HD 218566b has been named Ugarit. The name was selected in the NameExoWorlds campaign by Syria, during the 100th anniversary of the IAU. Ugarit was a city where its scribes devised the Ugaritic alphabet around 1400 B.C.

=== Analysis of the delta effect ===
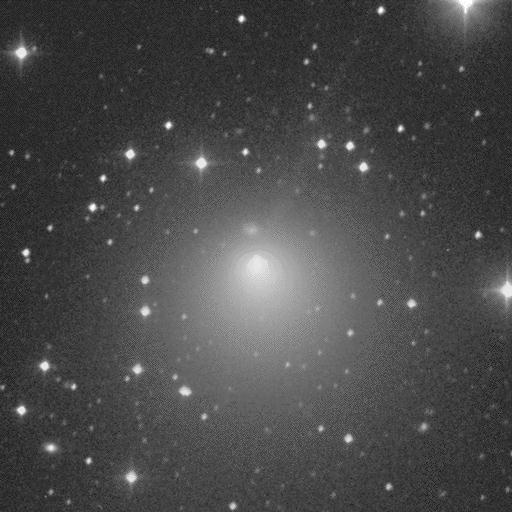
Comet Encke, a periodic comet whose data was analyzed by Jalowiczor to determine whether or not the law $\Delta^{-2}$ held for the delta effect.

Jalowiczor has also done research relating to comets. The work confirmed the delta effect (the variation in the distance $\Delta$ between a comet and its observer affecting the perceived cometary coma magnitude). The formula for this effect was known to be $\Delta^{-k}$. Most astronomers believed $k = 2$ but Ernst Öpik questioned this and claimed $k = 1$. Jalowiczor's paper confirmed that $k = 2$, though it can vary. His analysis used a photograph of Comet Halley taken by an Anglo-Australian 3.9-meter reflector.

=== Published work ===
Jalowiczor's work towards the discovery of exoplanets has been published in the Astrophysical Journal in a paper titled The Lick-Carnegie Survey: Four New Exoplanet Candidates written with Stefano Meschiari, Gregory P. Laughlin, Steven S. Vogt, R. Paul Butler, Eugenio J. Rivera, and Nader Haghighipour. Jalowiczor has also published in the journal Monthly Notices of the Royal Astronomical Society in 1993, in a paper titled On the variation of cometary coma brightness with comet-Earth distance (the Delta Effect), authored with David Hughes, Neil McBride, and James Boswell, a research team led by David Hughes at the University of Sheffield. More recent work includes the discovery of low-mass companions to known eclipsing binary systems. In December 2023, Jalowiczor was included as a co-author on a major paper Full-sky 20-pc Census of 3,600 Stars and Brown Dwarfs. One of the co-authors on this paper was Hiro Higashimura, a 12-year old Japanese student, coached in Astronomy by Jalowiczor.

== Personal life ==
=== Football ===
Jalowiczor was the main founder of the Polish Millers, otherwise known as KP Millers Trojwies. This was a non-league football club in Poland set up in 1996 and registered in the Polish league in 1997. The club drew the name both from English club Rotherham United FC and the area where it was based, Trojwies, centered on the village of Istebna. Approximately 180 articles were written in the Rotherham United match program charting the beginnings of the Polish Millers from the 1990/ 1991 season to the end of the 2000/2001 season after this period about 20 reports in the intervening years. The highlight in Polish Millers' history was a friendly against 14 times Polish Champions KS Ruch Chorzow in 2006 to commemorate the club's tenth anniversary. This was attended by a delegation from Rotherham United, Rotherham Council and the Millers' Supporters' Trust. The match finished in a 3:3 draw. Jalowiczor has been awarded three times by the Polish Football Association, or the PZPN (Polski Zwiazek Pilki Noznej), for his work.

=== Writing ===
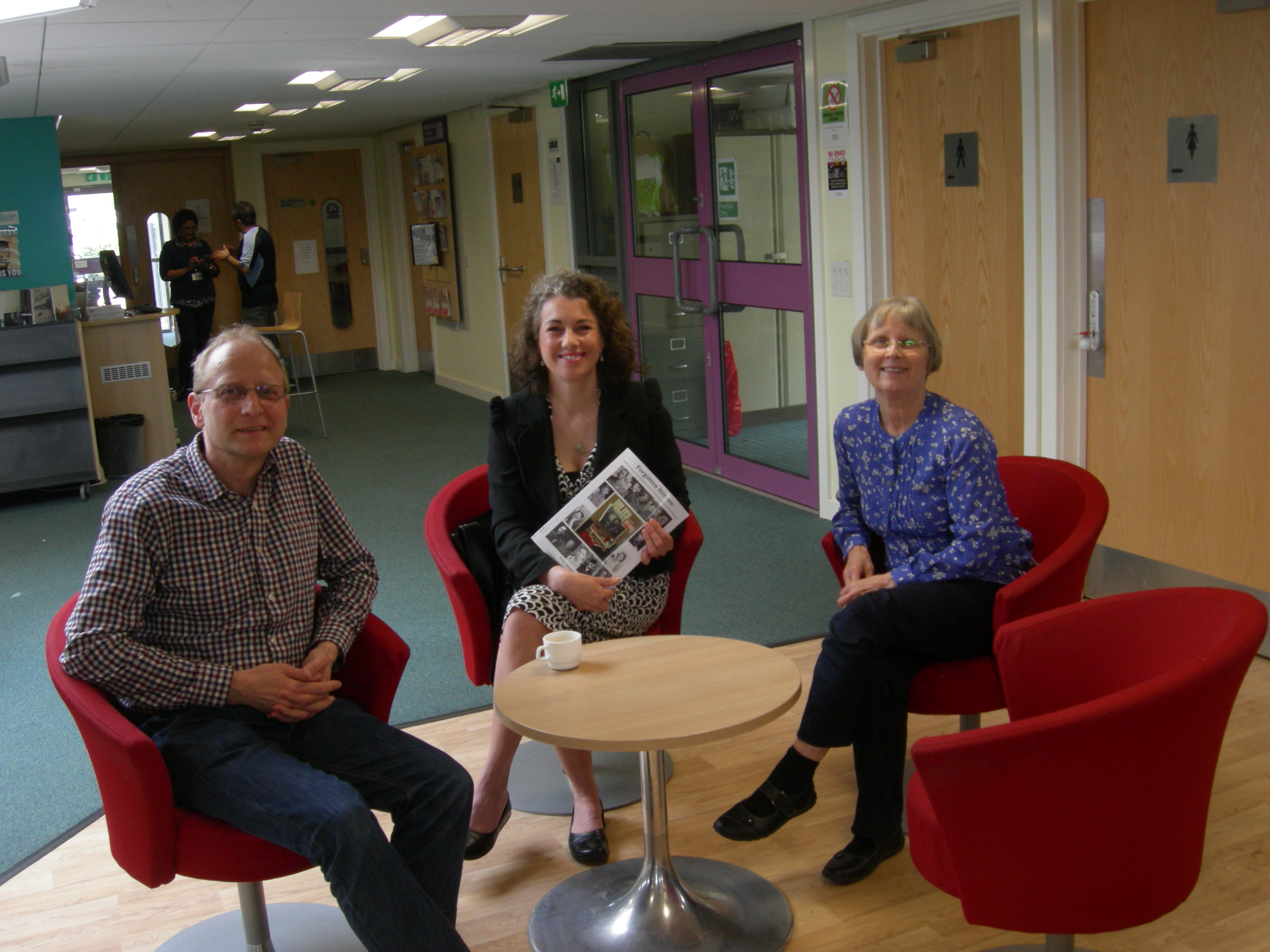
Peter Jalowiczor, Christl Kettle with the MP for Rotherham Sarah Champion holding a copy of Forgotten Heroes during a meeting of the Anglo-Polish Society, May 2017.

Jalowiczor is a member of Sheffield Authors and has written four books, including two about World War II and two about football. His first book was titled The Polish Millers: A Piece of Rotherham United History in Poland (2005). His second book was about Millmoor football and was called Postcards from Millmoor. Rotherham United manager Steve Evans was a guest at the book's launch. Jalowiczor published his third book, Forgotten Heroes, in 2014. It is a collection of WWII accounts from Polish ex-servicemen who settled in Rotherham after the war and charts the development of their community in the following decades. Most proceeds were donated to Cancer Research via the Inspiration For Life Trust Fund at the Department of Physics and Astronomy at the University of Sheffield. Some funds were targeted for a memorial for a Rotherham Polish ex-serviceman who died in 1991. In September 2015, meetings from families and friends connected to the Poles who settled in the town started meeting at the Mowbray Gardens library. From January 2017, the meetings became monthly and in April 2017, an Anglo-Polish Society was registered. A fourth book was released Forgotten Heroes: Expanded Volume (2020). This built on the original book with updated chapters with additional contributions from the Polish Community.

== See also ==
- Amateur Astronomy
- Exoplanets
- Brown dwarf
- Red dwarf
- White Dwarf
