= Ieuan Rhys Williams =

Welsh actor (1909–1973)

- Born: Ieuan Rhys Williams; 27 October 1909; Pontardawe, Glamorgan
- Died: 1973 (aged 64); Cardiff, Wales
- Occupation: Actor
- Spouse: Jenni Lyn Williams
- Children: Rhiannon Lloyd Gregory; Indeg Wynn Jones

Ieuan Rhys Williams (27 October 1909 – 1973) was a Welsh film, radio and television actor and producer.

== Career ==
He appeared in Fo a Fe, a Welsh sitcom, as Sioni the bartender; the television series Moulded in Earth (1965) as regular cast member John Ellis; and the drama film Under Milk Wood (1972) with the minor role of Gomer Owen.

He starred in a number of Welsh-language programmes and films, including Noson Lawen (1949).

== See also ==
- Lists of actors
- List of Welsh people
