= HD 177830 =

Binary star system in the constellation Lyra

Observation data Epoch J2000.0 Equinox ICRS
- Constellation: Lyra
- Right ascension: 19^{h} 05^{m} 20.7732^{s}
- Declination: +25° 55′ 14.373″
- Apparent magnitude (V): 7.175

Characteristics

A
- Evolutionary stage: subgiant or giant
- Spectral type: K2IV

B
- Evolutionary stage: main sequence
- Spectral type: M4V

Astrometry
Radial velocity (R_{v})	−71.86±0.06 km/s
Proper motion (μ)	RA: −41.248(12) mas/yr Dec.: −52.580(17) mas/yr
Parallax (π)	16.0063±0.0165 mas
Distance	203.8 ± 0.2 ly (62.48 ± 0.06 pc)
Absolute magnitude (M_{V})	+3.33

Orbit
Period (P)	~800 yr
Semi-major axis (a)	97 au

Details

A
Mass	1.48 M_{☉}
Radius	3.6 R_{☉}
Luminosity	6.3 L_{☉}
Surface gravity (log g)	3.43 cgs
Temperature	4,824 K
Metallicity [Fe/H]	0.31 dex
Rotational velocity (v sin i)	2.54 km/s
Age	4.4±2.2 Gyr

B
Mass	0.23 M_{☉}

Other designations
- BD+25°3719, Gliese 743.2, HIP 93746, GSC 02126-01196, SAO 86791

Database references
SIMBAD	data

HD 177830 is a 7th magnitude binary star system located approximately 205 light-years away in the constellation of Lyra. The primary star is slightly more massive than the Sun, but cooler being a type K star. It has evolved away from the main sequence and expanded to 3.6 times the radius of the Sun. In visual light it is over six times brighter than the Sun, but because of its distance, about 204 light years, it is not visible to the unaided eye. With binoculars it is be easily visible.

The primary star is known to have two extrasolar planets orbiting around it.

== Stellar system ==
HD 177830 is a binary system consisting of two stars orbiting at a distance of 100 to 200 AU with a likely period of roughly 800 years.

The primary, HD 177830A, is an evolved K2IV star with an effective temperature of 4,824 K. It has been described as a subgiant approaching the giant stage, but other sources place it on the red giant branch already.

The secondary star is a red dwarf with a mass about a quarter that of the Sun.

== Planetary system ==
On November 1, 1999, the discovery of a planet HD 177830 b was announced by the California and Carnegie Planet Search team using the very successful radial velocity method and an analysis on data released by the team performed by amateur astronomer Peter Jalowiczor along with two other planets. This planet is nearly 50% more massive than Jupiter (M_{J}) and takes 407 days to orbit the star in an extremely circular orbit. In 2000 a group of scientists proposed, based on preliminary Hipparcos astrometrical satellite data, that the orbital inclination of HD 177830 b is as little as 1.3°. If that was the case, the planet would have a mass of 67 M_{J}, making it a brown dwarf instead of a planet. However, it is very unlikely that the planet would have such orbit. Furthermore, brown dwarfs with short orbits around solar-mass (M_{☉}) stars are exceedingly rare (the so-called "brown dwarf desert") making the claim even more unlikely.

On November 17, 2010, the discovery of a second planet HD 177830 c was announced along with four other planets. The planet has 50% the mass of Saturn and takes 111 days to orbit the star in a very eccentric orbit. This planet is in a near 4:1 resonance with the outer planet.

The HD 177830 planetary system
Companion (in order from star)	Mass	Semimajor axis (AU)	Orbital period (days)	Eccentricity	Inclination (°)	Radius
c	≥0.15±0.03 M_{J}	0.5137±0.0006	110.9±0.3	0.3495±0.0002	—	—
b	≥1.49±0.03 M_{J}	1.2218±0.0008	406.6±0.4	0.009±0.004	—	—

== See also ==
- List of exoplanets discovered before 2000 - HD 177830 b
- List of exoplanets discovered in 2010 - HD 177830 c
