= Welsh bardic music =

== Overview ==
Welsh bardic music is a form of Welsh folk music that was most widespread during Wales in the Middle Ages, pre-Edwardian conquest. Originally, bardic music was performed by a bard, who would compose a poem set to music. In the Welsh tradition, these bards were originally an extension of the druidical hierarchy, which was divided into three sects; priests, philosophers, and poets.

Bardic music in Wales was primarily performed in court settings, and shared a relationship with Welsh cerdd dafod (strict-meter poetry or, "the craft of the tongue"). Bards in medieval Wales were considered craftsmen, and were often referred to as gwŷr wrth gerdd (literally, men with/at their craft). Bards played large roles in eisteddfod, competing alongside minstrels to be chosen by a noble or royal patron. Welsh nobility are credited with hosting the first eisteddfodau, showcasing the relationship between the courts, bards, and other artisans.

Due to the oral nature of bardic traditions, there are few primary sources from early Welsh history. Many of the later work by Welsh bards, such as the Book of Aneirin or the Book of Taliesin are more recent recreations of older tales from bards. After the Edwardian conquest and the increasing anglicisation of Wales, the bardic order had largely disappeared by the 1700s.

== General features of musical style ==
Hallmarks of Welsh bardic music included the use of cerdd dant ("the craft of the string"), which is vocalization over a melody played on a harp or crwth alongside a datgeiniad, the narrator or specialized singer of the bardic verse. These performances pulled from social frameworks and were primarily oral in nature.

=== Examples of Welsh bardic works ===
- Y Gododdin
- Book of Aneirin
- Book of Taliesin
- Canu Llywarch Hen
- Y Llafurwr
