= Welsh folk music =

Overview of folk music in Wales

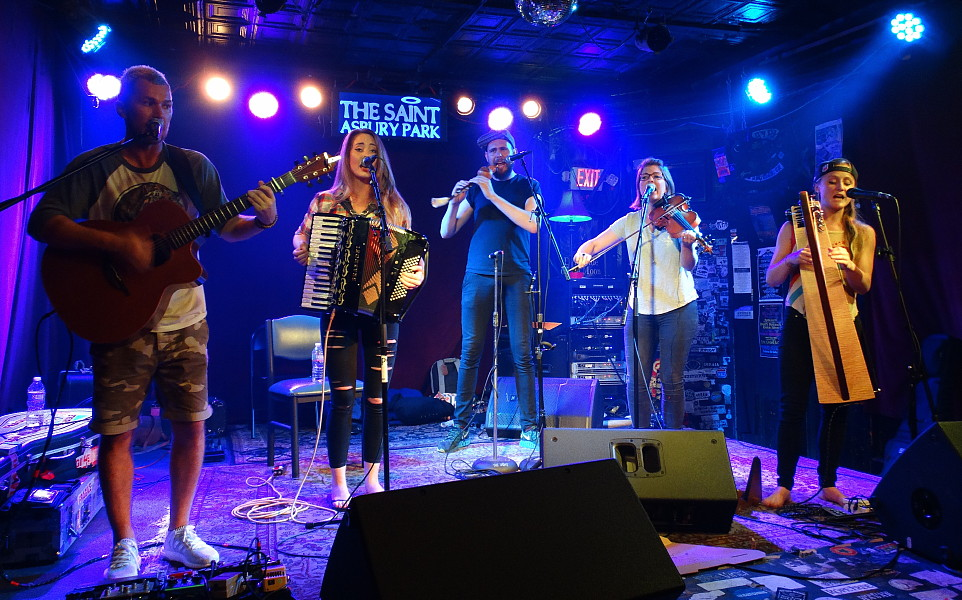
The band Calan, a modern band performing with a Welsh traditional style and mostly Welsh traditional instruments.

Welsh folk music (Welsh: Cerddoriaeth werin Gymreig) is traditional music sung or played in Wales, by Welsh people or originating from Wales.

Folk artists include; traditional bands Calan and Ar log; harpists Sian James, Catrin Finch and Nansi Richards and folk singer Dafydd Iwan.

== Traditions and history ==
Kenneth Bowen singing the first verse of "Ar Lan y Môr"

Early musical traditions during the 17th and 18th centuries saw the emergence of more complex carols, away from the repetitive ceremonial songs. These carols featured complex poetry based on cynghanedd. Some were sung to English tunes, but many used Welsh melodies such as 'Ffarwel Ned Puw'. The most common type of Welsh folk song is the love song, with lyrics pertaining to the sorrow of parting or in praise of the girl. A few employ sexual metaphor and mention the act of bundling. After love songs, the ballad was a very popular form of song, with its tales of manual labour, agriculture and everyday life. Popular themes in the 19th century included murder, emigration and colliery disasters; they were sung to popular melodies from Ireland or North America.

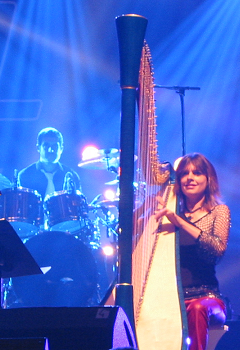
Catrin Finch, Welsh harpist on stage at the InterCeltic Festival at Lorient, Aug 2008.

During the British folk revival of the early 1900s, some of the verses in the Hen Penillion (Old Stanzas) were exploded into longer songs, for example Ar Lan y Môr and Marwnad yr Ehedydd.

=== Harp tradition ===
The manuscript of Robert ap Huw is the earliest surviving harp music in Europe and it comes from Wales.

=== Cerdd Dant ===
This tradition descends from the form used by the early bards to sing their poetry to Welsh kings, princes and princesses.

=== Plygain ===
Singer Arfon Gwilym explains that "the plygain tradition survives mainly in Montgomeryshire and takes place in churches and chapels over a six week period during Christmas and the new year."

"After a short service, the plygain is declared open and anyone in the audience can take part, as individuals or as small parties, the most common party being three people, singing in close harmony. The singing is always unaccompanied and in the past was dominated by men who sang in a simple folk style that was unique."

=== Traditional folk songs and ballads ===
Singer Siân James explains that "a ballad which caught my imagination from a very young age was the very beautiful Yr Eneth ga'dd ei gwrthod (The rejected maiden) - a 19th century ballad from the Cynwyd area near Bala, Gwynedd, which tells the story of a young girl who, finding herself pregnant out of wedlock, is thrown out of her family home by her father, ostracised by her community and left destitute." "It ends with the girl drowning herself. She is found with a water-sodden note in her hand, asking to be buried without a headstone, so her existence would be forgotten."

=== Dance reels ===
Thanks to the work of individuals such as Lady Llanover in the 18th century, many of Wales' traditional dance reels have survived.

=== Macaronic: Bilingual songs ===
Macaronic songs developed during the Industrial Revolution in which Welsh speaking people merged with migrant workers to form bilingual songs.

=== Celtic folk revival ===
In the 1960s and 1970s, Welsh language activism increased significantly. A well-known Welsh folk music group is Ar Log: "By the early eighties Ar Log was travelling Europe and North & South America for around nine months of the year with a wealth of traditional Welsh folk music at our disposal, from haunting love songs and harp airs, to melodic dance tunes, and rousing sea shanties."

=== Modern folk and protest songs ===
Dafydd Iwan is a singer and composer from Wales known for his political activism during the 1960s, 1970s and 1980s and the campaign for the Welsh language by Cymdeithas yr Iaith, the Welsh Language Movement. He states that "songs have been a natural medium for expressing strong emotions and political protest for centuries, and here in Wales there is a long tradition of ballads with a strong social and political theme". His most notable song, Yma o Hyd sung at international rugby and football matches.

== Traditional instruments ==
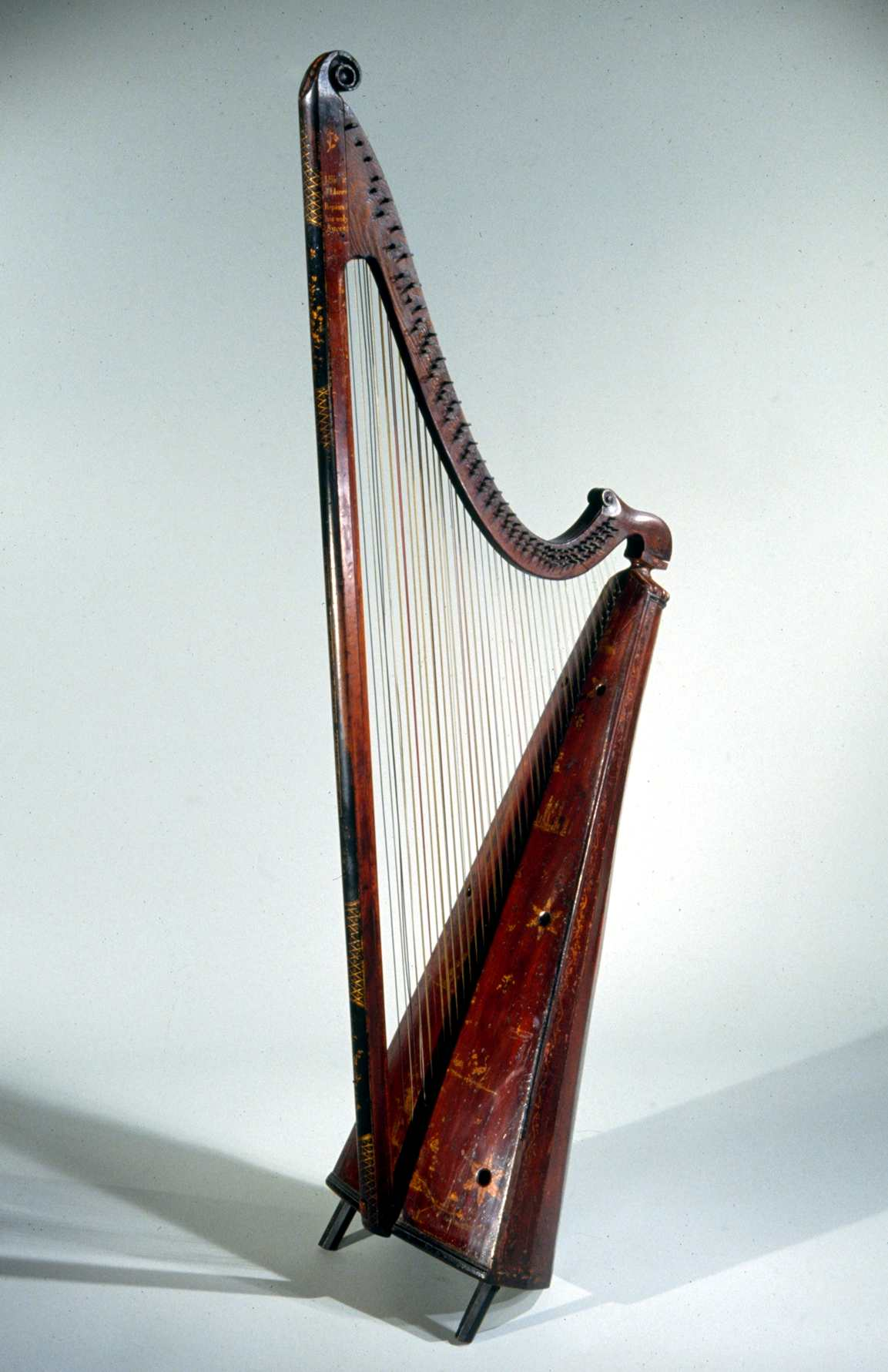
Welsh triple harp.

=== Harp ===
The instrument most commonly associated with Wales is the harp, which is generally considered to be the country's national instrument. Though it originated in Italy, the triple harp (telyn deires, "three-row harp") is held up as the traditional harp of Wales: it has three rows of strings, with every semitone separately represented, while modern concert harps use a pedal system to change key by stopping the relevant strings. After losing ground to the pedal harp in the 19th century, it has been re-popularised through the efforts of Nansi Richards, Llio Rhydderch and Robin Huw Bowen. The penillion are a traditional form of Welsh singing poetry, accompanied by the harp, in which the singer and harpist follow different melodies so that the stressed syllables of the poem coincide with accented beats of the harp melody.

The earliest written records of the Welsh harpists' repertoire are contained in the Robert ap Huw manuscript, which documents 30 ancient harp pieces that make up a fragment of the lost repertoire of the medieval Welsh bards. The music was composed between the 14th and 16th centuries, transmitted orally, then written down in a unique tablature and later copied in the early 17th century. This manuscript contains the earliest body of harp music from anywhere in Europe and is one of the key sources of early Welsh music. The manuscript has been the source of a long-running effort to accurately decipher the music it encodes.

=== Crwth ===
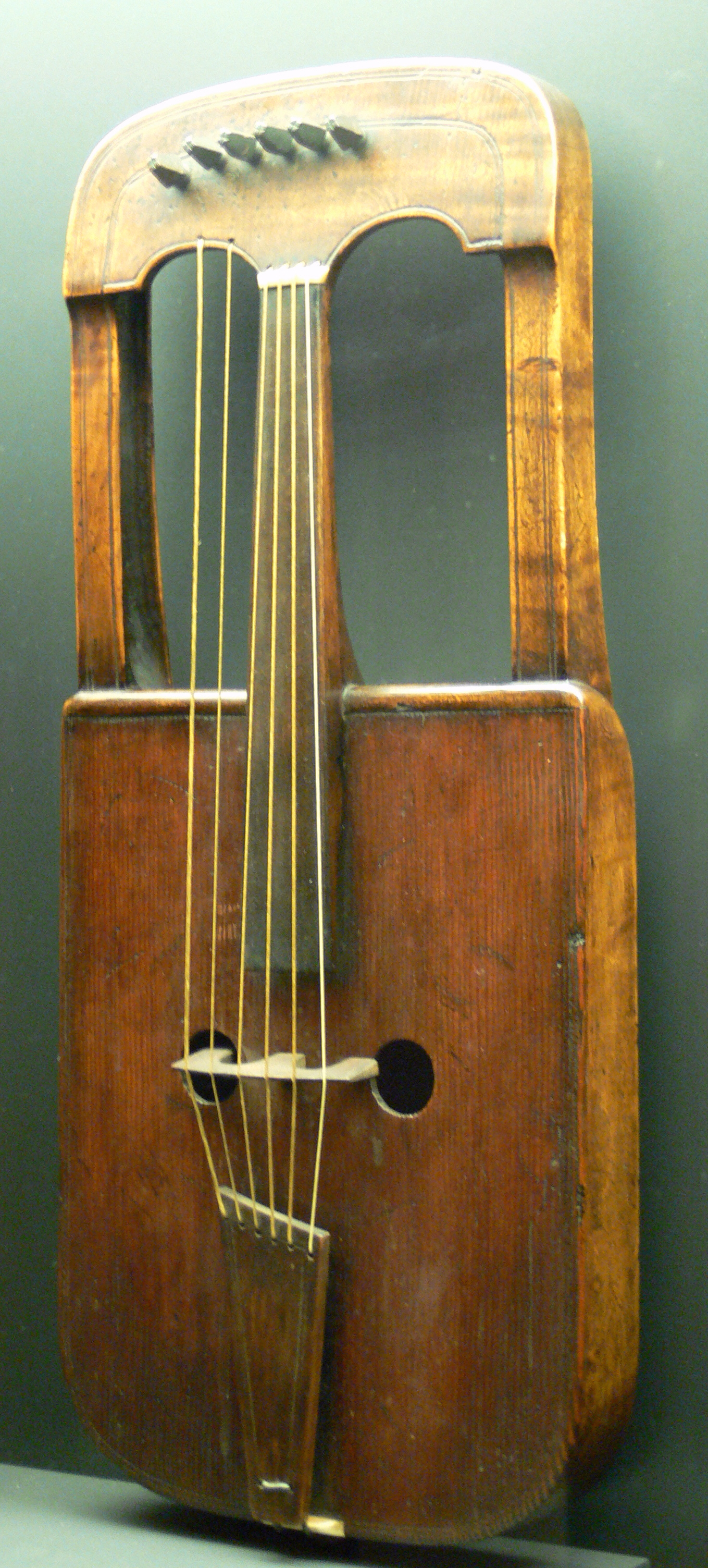
Welsh crwth, 1800–1825 .

Another distinctive instrument is the crwth, also a stringed instrument of a type once widespread in northern Europe. It was played in Wales from the Middle Ages. It was superseded by the fiddle (Welsh Ffidil), but lingered on later in Wales than elsewhere, although it had died out by the nineteenth century at the latest. The fiddle is an integral part of Welsh folk music.

=== Welsh bagpipes and pibgorn ===
The Welsh bagpipe is a native Welsh instrument. A related instrument is one type of bagpipe chanter, which when played without the bag and drone is called a pibgorn (hornpipe). The generic term "pibau" (pipes) which covers all woodwind instruments is also used. They have been played, documented, represented and described in Wales since the fourteenth century.

== See also ==
- Traditional Welsh costume
- Welsh dance
- Welsh stepdance
