= SS David E. Hughes =

Liberty ship

History

United States
- Name: David E. Hughes
- Namesake: David E. Hughes
- Builder: California Shipbuilding Corporation, Los Angeles, California
- Yard number: 199
- Way number: 4
- Laid down: 10 May 1943
- Launched: 31 May 1943
- Fate: Scuttled, 1970

General characteristics
- Type: Liberty ship
- Tonnage: 7,000 long tons deadweight (DWT)
- Length: 441 ft 6 in (134.57 m)
- Beam: 56 ft 11 in (17.35 m)
- Draft: 27 ft 9 in (8.46 m)
- Propulsion: Two oil-fired boilers; Triple-expansion steam engine; Single screw; 2,500 hp (1,864 kW)
- Speed: 11 knots (20 km/h; 13 mph)
- Capacity: 9,140 tons cargo
- Complement: 41
- Armament: 1 × Stern-mounted 4 in (100 mm) deck gun; AA guns

SS David E. Hughes (MC contract 1666) was a Liberty ship built in the United States during World War II. She was named after David E. Hughes, an American musician, professor, and inventor.

The ship was laid down at the California Shipbuilding Corporation in Los Angeles, California, on 10 May 1943, then launched on 31 May 1943. She was operated durning World War II by the States Marine Corporation. While in the Western Pacific she delivered supplies to the Australians, ferried Australian troops, and delivered supplies to the Russian Army in Iran. On 4 April 1944 she transported the Australian 4th Battalion along with other 5th Division troops from Langemak Bay, Finschafen, Papua, New Guinea, then sailed to Saidor, a 21-hour voyage. She returned from Hollandia, Dutch West Indies to San Francisco on 5 January 1945 with her crew of nine men and US Navy Armed Guard contingent of 24 men. In 1948 she did post war work operated by W. R. Chamberlin & Company, then Boland and Cornelius Company and then United States Navigation Company. In 1949 she was placed in the US Reserve fleet. In 1950 she was remove from the Reserve fleet for support of the Korean War and operated by T. J. Stevenson & Company, Inc. and then Shepard Steamship Company. From 1957 to 1958 and in 1968 she was used to store surplus grain with the Blidberg Rothchild Company and then Moore McCormack Lines.

She was scuttled with obsolete ammunition in 1970.
