= David Hughes (astronomer) =

British astronomer (1941–2022)

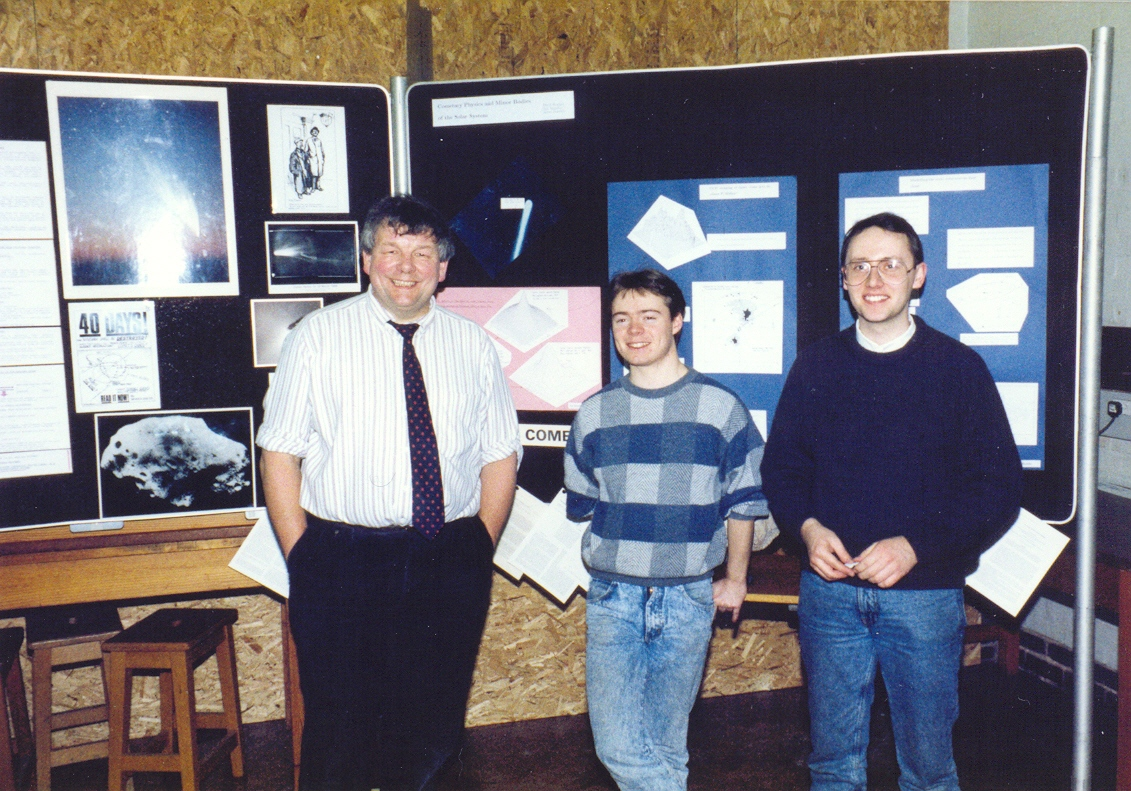
Hughes (left) and his research students James Boswell and Neil McBride at the research bazaar 1991

David W. Hughes (7 November 1941 – 6 June 2022) was a British astronomer who was professor of astronomy at the University of Sheffield, where he worked from 1965 to 2007. Hughes published over 200 research papers on asteroids, comets, meteorites and meteoroids. He wrote on the history of astronomy, the origin of the Solar System and the impact threat to planet Earth.

== Early life ==
Hughes was born in East Retford, Nottinghamshire, and educated at Mundella School (now Nottingham Emmanuel School), Birmingham University (1959–1962), where he gained a degree in physics, and Oxford University (1962–1965, New College and the University Observatory), where he was awarded a D.Phil. in solar astrophysics.

== Professional career ==
Hughes became an assistant lecturer at Sheffield after leaving Oxford. Beyond his research, his teaching specialised in the history of astronomy, solar and planetary studies and geophysics. He was one of a small group of staff who established astronomy as a separate degree subject within Sheffield University's Physics department (now Physics and Astronomy). He progressed to a chair (professorship) and was given an emeritus chair on retirement.

== Public outreach ==
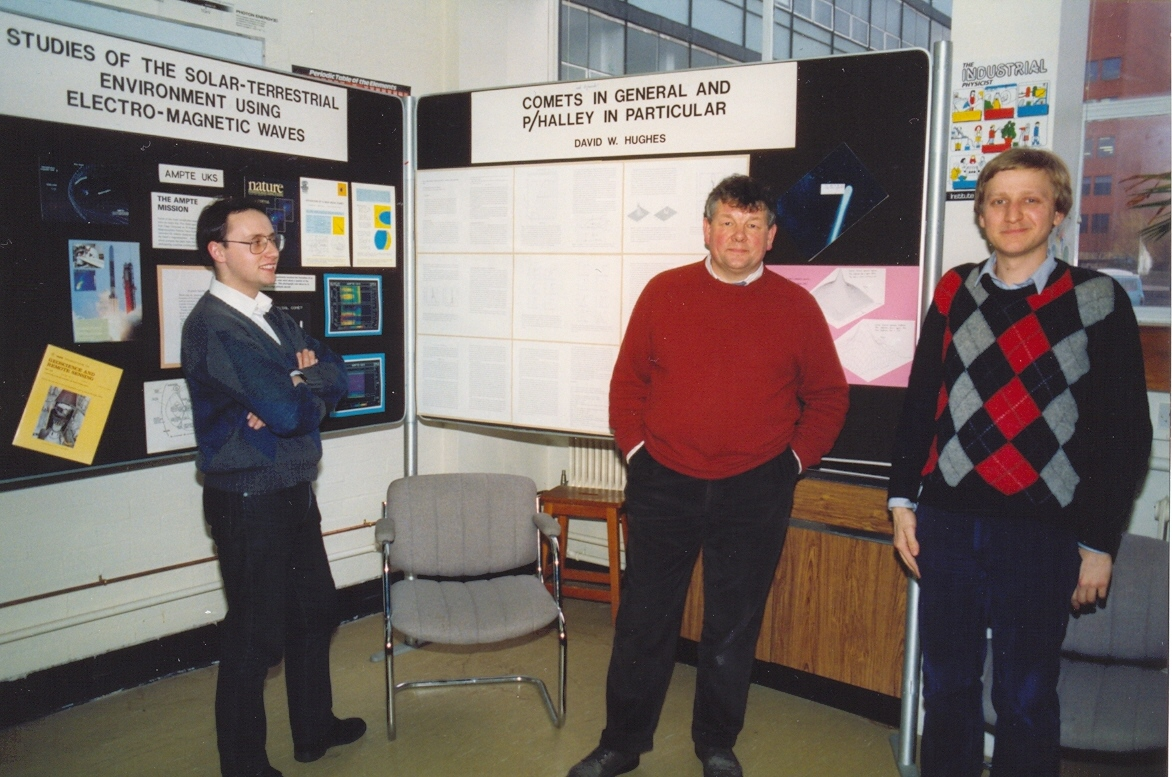
Hughes (centre) pictured in 1990 with his research students Neil McBride and Peter Jalowiczor.

Hughes often appeared on TV, most notably with the live coverage of the ESA Giotto space mission to Halley's Comet. He also appeared on Christmas day TV, between the Queen's address and a Queen concert, discussing his interpretation of the biblical Christmas story. This was based on his book The Star of Bethlehem: an astronomer's confirmation, Walker, Pocket, Dent, Corgi, 1979. After retiring Hughes spent his life in Sheffield writing about astronomy and as a member of the Royal Astronomical Society's Astronomy Heritage Committee. He enjoyed giving astronomy talks on cruise ships where, on many occasions, he represented the Smithsonian Museum in Washington DC.

== Personal life ==
Hughes enjoyed collecting livery buttons, Chinese ceramics and cast-iron railway signs. He is survived by his wife Carole Stott, who also writes on astronomy, and their two children, Ellen and Owen.

=== Awards and honours ===
The Mars-crossing asteroid 4205 David Hughes, discovered by Edward Bowell in 1985, was named in his honour. The official naming citation was published by the Minor Planet Center on 2 November 1990 (M.P.C. 17223).

== Bibliography ==
- "Understanding the Solar System"; Hughes, David W., ISBN 978-0-7641-7930-3, Library of Congress Number: 2005930854; First edition published in 2006 by Barron's Educational Series, Inc. Copyright 2006 Quintet Publishing Limited. 96 pages. Illustrated.
