= David Hughes (Somerset cricketer) =

English cricketer (1934–2025)

Personal information
- Full name: David Garfield Hughes
- Born: 21 May 1934; Taunton, Somerset, England
- Died: 20 February 2025 (aged 90)
- Batting: Right-handed

Domestic team information
- Years: Team
- 1955: Somerset

Career statistics
Competition	FC
Matches	1
Runs scored	2
Batting average	2.00
100s/50s	0/0
Top score	2
Catches/stumpings	1/1
- Source: CricketArchive, 22 December 2015

David Garfield Hughes (21 May 1934 – 20 February 2025) was an English cricketer who played one first-class cricket match for Somerset in 1955.

Hughes was a right-handed lower-order batsman and a wicketkeeper, and his single match for Somerset's first team came about because of the (rare) unavailability of the regular wicketkeeper of the 1950s, Harold Stephenson. In the match against Nottinghamshire at County Ground, Taunton, he took one catch and made one stumping, and contributed two runs to Somerset's second innings after not batting in the first.

Hughes played for Somerset's second eleven in the Minor Counties and the Second Eleven Championship over many years, with his final appearance for the side in 1977. He also played Minor Counties cricket for Wiltshire in the 1960s.

Hughes died on 20 February 2025, at the age of 90.
