= Dave Hughes (footballer) =

Australian rules footballer

Personal information
- Full name: Dave Hughes
- Born: 16 February 1945
- Original team: CBC St Kilda
- Height: 185 cm (6 ft 1 in)
- Weight: 83 kg (183 lb)
- Position: Forward

Playing career^{1}
Years	Club	Games (Goals)
1964	St Kilda	2 (0)
- ^{1} Playing statistics correct to the end of 1964.

Dave Hughes (born 16 February 1945) is a former Australian rules footballer who played with St Kilda in the Victorian Football League (VFL).
