= David Hughes (Hertfordshire cricketer) =

Irish cricketer

Personal information
- Full name: Nicholas David Hughes
- Born: 6 July 1978 (age 48); Dublin, Leinster, Ireland
- Batting: Right-handed
- Bowling: Right-arm medium

Domestic team information
- Years: Team
- 1997–2006: Hertfordshire

Career statistics
Competition	List A
Matches	2
Runs scored	25
Batting average	12.50
100s/50s	–/–
Top score	25
Balls bowled	96
Wickets	1
Bowling average	107.00
5 wickets in innings	–
10 wickets in match	–
Best bowling	1/73
Catches/stumpings	–/–
- Source: Cricinfo, 29 October 2021

David Hughes (born Nicholas David Hughes on 6 July 1978) was an Irish cricketer. He was a right-handed batsman and right-arm medium-pace bowler who played for Hertfordshire. He was born in Dublin.

Hughes, who made a single appearance for Hampshire Second XI in 1997, and two appearances in 1999 for Surrey Second XI, made his only List A appearance during the 2000 NatWest Trophy, against Cambridgeshire. From the opening order, Hughes scored a duck with the bat, and took bowling figures of 0-34.

After his playing career, Hughes worked as Head of Cricket at Bishop's Stortford College.
