= 4205 David Hughes =

Mars-crossing asteroid

Discovery
- Discovered by: E. Bowell
- Discovery site: Anderson Mesa Stn.
- Discovery date: 18 December 1985

Designations
- Named after: David Hughes (British astronomer)
- Alternative designations: 1985 YP · 1986 AF; 1986 CF
- Minor planet category: Mars-crosser

Orbital characteristics
- Epoch 23 March 2018 (JD 2458200.5)
- Uncertainty parameter 0
- Observation arc: 37.73 yr (13,780 d)
- Aphelion: 1.9843 AU
- Perihelion: 1.4686 AU
- Semi-major axis: 1.7264 AU
- Eccentricity: 0.1494
- Orbital period (sidereal): 2.27 yr (829 d)
- Mean anomaly: 132.52°
- Mean motion: 0° 26^{m} 4.2^{s} / day
- Inclination: 16.479°
- Longitude of ascending node: 276.55°
- Argument of perihelion: 109.98°
- Earth MOID: 0.5525 AU (215 LD)

Physical characteristics
- Mean diameter: 3.92 km (calculated)
- Synodic rotation period: 24 h
- Geometric albedo: 0.20 (assumed)
- Spectral type: SMASS = Xe
- Absolute magnitude (H): 14.4

4205 David Hughes, provisional designation 1985 YP, is a Mars-crossing asteroid from inside the innermost regions of the asteroid belt, approximately 4 kilometers (2.5 miles) in diameter. It was discovered on 18 December 1985, by American astronomer Edward Bowell at Lowell's Anderson Mesa Station near Flagstaff, Arizona. The transitional X-type asteroid has a longer-than average rotation period of at least 24 hours. It was named for British astronomer David Hughes.

== Orbit and classification ==
David Hughes is a Mars-crossing asteroid, a member of the dynamically unstable group, located between the main belt and near-Earth populations, and crossing the orbit of Mars at 1.666 AU. It orbits the Sun inside the innermost region of the asteroid belt at a distance of 1.5–2.0 AU once every 2 years and 3 months (829 days; semi-major axis of 1.73 AU). Its orbit has an eccentricity of 0.15 and an inclination of 16° with respect to the ecliptic. On 12 October 2026 it will pass 4,341,000 km; 2,698,000 mi (0.02902 AU) from Mars. Another close Martian approach will occur at a similar distance on 24 November 2103.

The body's observation arc begins with a precovery taken at the Siding Spring Observatory in June 1980, or five years prior to its official discovery observation at Anderson Mesa.

== Physical characteristics ==
In the SMASS classification, David Hughes is a Xe-subtype that transitions from the X-type to the very bright E-type asteroids.

=== Rotation period ===
In August 2012, a rotational lightcurve of David Hughes was obtained from photometric observations by Italian amateur astronomers Roberto Crippa and Federico Manzini at the Sozzago Astronomical Station (A12). Lightcurve analysis gave a rotation period of at least 24 hours with a brightness amplitude of 0.25 magnitude (U=2-). Most asteroids have a period shorter than 20 hours (also see List of slow rotators).

=== Diameter and albedo ===
The Collaborative Asteroid Lightcurve Link assumes an albedo of 0.20 and calculates a diameter of 3.92 kilometers based on an absolute magnitude of 14.4.

This makes David Hughes one of the smallest mid-sized Mars-crossing asteroids smaller than 1065 Amundsenia (9.75 km), 1474 Beira (8.73 km), 1011 Laodamia (7.5 km), 1727 Mette (est. 9 km), 1131 Porzia (7.13 km), 1235 Schorria (est. 9 km), 985 Rosina (8.18 km), 1310 Villigera (15.24 km) and 1468 Zomba (7 km), and much smaller than the largest members of this dynamical group, namely, 132 Aethra, 323 Brucia, 1508 Kemi, 2204 Lyyli and 512 Taurinensis, which are all larger than 20 kilometers in diameter.

== Naming ==
This minor planet was named after British astronomer and professor of astronomy at the University of Sheffield. The official naming citation was published by the Minor Planet Center on 2 November 1990 (M.P.C. 17223).
