= Noson Lawen (film) =

- Directed by: G. Mark Lloyd
- Written by: Sam Jones
- Starring: Meredydd Evans; Ieuan Rhys Williams; Nellie Hodgkins; Robert Roberts
- Release date: 1949
- Running time: 27 minutes
- Country: United Kingdom
- Language: Welsh

Noson Lawen is a 1949 short Welsh language Welsh film directed by Marc Lloyd and starring Meredydd Evans, Ieuan Rhys Williams, Nellie Hodgkins and Robert Roberts. It was written by Sam Jones, Head of the Welsh BBC in Bangor, based on the radio series he created.

A noson lawen is traditional Welsh party with music.

== Plot ==
Ifan, a farmer's son living in the Welsh hills, dreams of an academic career. His father, his mother and his wife, Gwen, use nearly all of their money to pay for him to go to a university and are terrified that he may fail his exams, and it will all have been for nothing. As Ifan's father counts the money left for the umpteenth time, the postmistress appears with startling news: Ifan has passed with flying colours.

After the graduation ceremony, Ifan introduces his friends, Emlyn and Hywel to his mother, father and lively grandfather. The boys eventually come to work on the farm.

A party follows, and Ifan, Emlyn and Hywel sing a composition by Meredydd Evans himself ("Moo Moo, Me Me, Cwac Cwac") and call themselves Triawd y Buarth. Then the Grandfather gets up on the stage and begins dancing around singing with an incredible voice.

== Cast ==
- Meredydd Evans as Ifan
- Ieuan Rhys Williams as father
- Nellie Hodgkins as mother
- Meriel Jones as Gwen
- Robert Roberts as grandfather
- Cledwyn Jones as Emlyn
- Robin Williams as Hywel
- Emily Davies as postmistress

== Production ==
It was filmed in Parc, near Bala.
