= Cerdd Dant =

Welsh musical tradition using vocal counterpoint

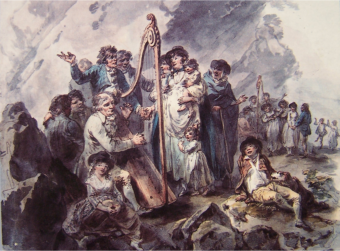
Penillion singing near Conwy (1792) by Julius Caesar Ibbetson

Yr Hen Glochydd
Nansi Richards (harp) and Emrys Jones (tenor)

Cerdd Dant (Welsh for 'string music', or penillion) is the art of vocal counterpoint over a given melody in Welsh musical tradition. It is an important competition in eisteddfodau. The singer or (small) choir sings a counter melody over a harp melody.

== History ==
Cerdd Dant is a unique tradition of singing lyrics over a harp melody. Traditional Welsh language singers who sang in stately homes tended to sing in a verse form that had strict rules about metre, rhyme, and acceleration. Cerdd Dant is usually performed by a solo singer and a harpist; however, it is also performed by choirs and with several harps. A common form is have a harp melody written down or a well known tune, while the vocalist improvises their own harmony while singing a poem.

When sung in a competition, there are strict rules about rhythm and cadences. When finishing a piece, the final verse has to end on a perfect cadence that is close to the home key so that the ending of the song is clear. In Wales, during the 14th, 15th and 16th centuries, two arts flourished side by side: cerdd dafod (the craft of the tongue, poetical craft) and cerdd dant (the craft of string music). The poets and musicians were part of an all-embracing bardic system. The poets wrote verse of an occasional nature, praising the exploits and virtues of their patrons: the Welsh nobility and high-ranking clergy. They also provided elegies, devotional poetry, commemorated the generous acts of their patrons and satirised certain people in verses which might have the intensity of curses. The art of poetry was learnt orally, i.e. examples were learnt by heart and exercises given as spoken instruction. Part of the poet or musician's craft was the ability to remember the important work of previous generations. One of the spurs to the active and generous patronage of poets must have been the prospect that one's name and deeds would live forever.

In descending social order came: poet, harper, crwth player and the specialised singer of bardic verse, the datgeiniad. The crafts of poetry and instrumental music were interdependent and the performance of a new poem, at its most splendid, probably required the services of the datgeiniad, harpist and/or crwth player; no doubt superintended by the poet. Between the beginning of the 14th century and the end of the 16th century Welsh poetical forms were brought to an extreme pitch of elaboration.

== Popularity ==
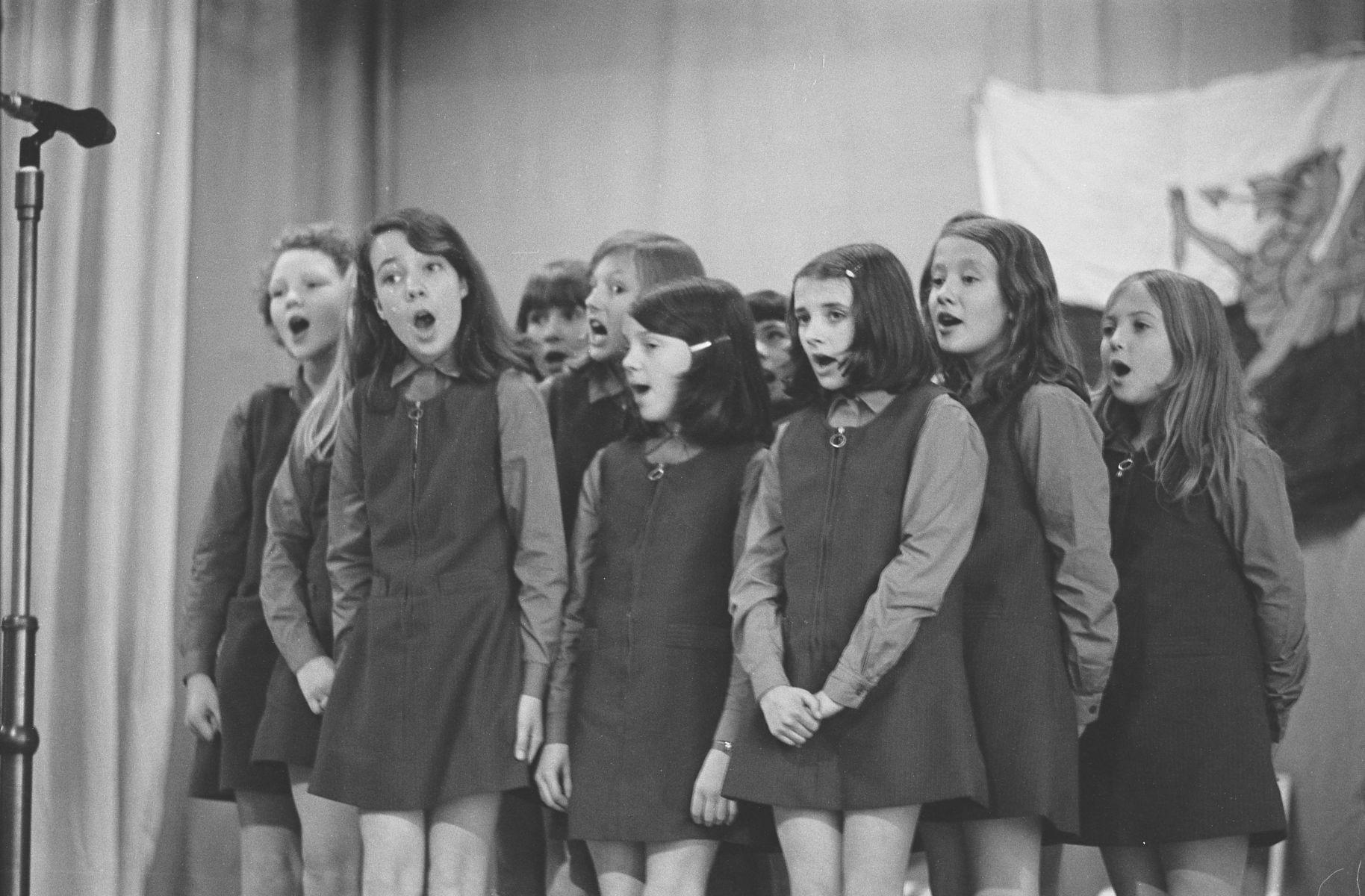
Performers at the Gŵyl Cerdd Dant 1973

Cerdd Dant is still an important part of Welsh culture and is continued to the present day. It is a major element of the National Eisteddfod

An annual Cerdd Dant festival is held each year at various locations around Wales. It was first held in 1947, in Y Felinheli.
