= Plygain =

Christian Christmas Day worship service

The Carol y Swper carol, recorded at St Garmon's Church, Llanarmon Dyffryn Ceiriog, December 2015

Plygain is a traditional Welsh Christmas service which takes place in a church between three and six o'clock in the morning, traditionally on Christmas morning.

The word 'plygain' possibly comes from the Latin word pullicantio, meaning 'when the cock crows at dawn'; some have suggested that it could also be derived from plygu, which means 'bending', as when bending forward in prayer. There are several variations on the word: pylgen, pilgen, plygan, plygen etc. The carols are very different from the usual English Christmas carol tradition in that every Plygain carol includes verses on the Crucifixion and Resurrection of Christ in addition to his birth. The Plygain was the only service in the church calendar to be held at night time, as the carrying of candles and the procession leading to the church was a part of the Plygain. Its roots lie in pre-Christian celebrations.

The word is first recorded in the Black Book of Carmarthen in early Welsh manuscripts in the 13th century ("pader na pilgeint na gosber"). Many Welsh Christmas carols are traditional, and could be called plygain in some circumstances, their tone being quite different to the Christmas carols that we know today, with many of the old Plygain songs in the Dorian mode.

== History ==
=== Carols ===
The plygain service is thought to have been created to replace the traditional Latin pre-Reformation Mass at Cockcrow (missa in gallicantu). Plygain carols were a feature of Welsh protestant worship from the 17th century until the mid-19th century; but despite a significant decline during the Victorian Era that tradition has continued in some places until the present day, especially in north-east Wales, and has experienced a revival in recent years. Author Charles Edwards (c. 1628 – c. 1691) published a volume entitled Llyfr Plygain gydag Almanac (Plygain Book with an Almanac) in 1682, but in that context 'llyfr plygain' means a book of prayers and not a collection of carols. The decline of the tradition in the mid-19th century was attributed to the rise of family gathering as an alternative Christmas-eve tradition and a 'Victorian' rebuff of the joyous celebrations which went with the Plygain. Some parishes had to abandon the practice after repeated instances of drunk villagers disrupting the services.

Most carols were written down including the works of plygain composer Huw Morys (1622–1709) and many families who had their own songs, passed down from generation to generation. Many of these are still sung today. In the 18th century a number of plygain were written by Jonathan Huws in his book Bardd y Byrddau, including Carol Plygain on the music of Gwêl yr Adeilad. Another author in the 19th century was Gwallter Mechain. Another was the poet Thomas Williams (c. 1769–1848), from Llanfihangel-yng-Ngwynfa in the Llanfyllin area, who published several volumes of carols and plygain. The hymns of Ann Griffiths also show the influence of plygain carols. In the 20th century, Canon Geraint Vaughan-Jones, a clergyman dedicated to preserving this tradition, published a collection of Plygain carols under the title Cyff Mawddwy, and this was republished by Lolfa Press in 1987 as Hen Garolau Plygain.

Plygain carols were long religious poems, which can be described as 'sermons in song', and frequently told the whole story of the salvation through Christ from the Fall in the Garden of Eden to his Second Coming, the Last Judgement and the joys of heaven; but they often had their musical origins in popular folk songs. Some of the plygain meters are complex and similar to the ballad, often twenty or more verses. There is normally a reference to the crucifixion of Christ – and they are unusual in Western Europe this regard, as they do not focus solely on the birth of Christ. They are generally sung as three- or four-part harmonies, and it is considered unacceptable to sing the same carol twice at the same service. Traditionally the plygain carols were sung only by men. This tradition relaxed in the late twentieth century – although one carol, the Carol y Swper, is still usually sung only by men in most places.

Often, the names of local farms or villages were incorporated into these songs, one notable example being 'Carol Wil Cae Coch' or, 'Wil Red Farm's Carol'.

=== Local traditions ===
In more rural areas, the locals would gather in local farmhouses to make a treacle toffee called cyflaith. In 1830s Marford, they decorated the farmhouse with winter foliage such as holly or mistletoe, and in 1774, in Dyffryn Clwyd, they lit the candles at two o'clock in the morning and sang and danced to harp music until the dawn service. In towns, or more populated areas, such as Tenby, crowds started the evening with a torch-lit procession, and the young men of the town would escort the local priest from his house to the church while the rest of the procession sang and blew cow-horns. Similar events were recorded in Laugharne and Llanfyllin.

Until recently, Plygain candles were lit throughout the church during the service. Candles were decorated with coloured paper and hoops woven by local congregants, and some parishes would fix them to brass candlesticks on the altar before Plygain began. In Dolgellau, the inside of the church was decorated with holly and coloured candles mounted in chandeliers. The ceremony was described as follows:

Now the church is in a blaze, now crammed, body, aisles, gallery, now Shon Robert, the club-footed shoemaker, and his wife, descending from the singing seat to the lower and front part of the gallery, strike up alternately, and without artificial aid of pitch pipe, the long, long carol and old favourite describing the Worship of Kings and of the Wise Men, and the Flight into Egypt, and the terrible wickedness of Herod. The crowds are wholly silent and rapt in admiration. Then the good Rector, and his curate, David Pugh, stand up, and read the Morning Service abbreviated, finishing with the prayer for All Conditions of Men, and the benediction restless and somewhat surging is the congregation during prayers the Rector obliged sometimes to stop short in his office and look direct at some part or persons, but no verbal admonishment. Prayers over, the singers begin again more carols, new singers, old carols in solos, duets, trios, choruses, then silence in the audience, broken at appropriate pauses by the suppressed hum, of delight and approval, till between eight and nine, hunger telling on the singers, the Plygain is over and the Bells strike out a round peal.

— William Payne, in a description quoted by the National Museum of Wales

In Maentwrog, near Blaenau Ffestiniog, there was a very short sermon as part of the service, and the church was decorated with candles fixed to the top of posts, which were themselves fastened to pews. The carol-singers in the bell tower found it too dark to follow the service in their Book of Common Prayer, and brought their own candles so that they could follow the service properly. The rector did carry out a service, but kept it very short, possibly because the main attraction was the singing.

Elsewhere, in Llanfair Dyffryn Clwyd, the congregation took a full communion during the plygain.

The National Library of Wales records that in Llanfyllin, a relatively rural area, the torches were replaced by candles, made by local chandlers and termed canhwyllau plygain ('Plygain Candles'). This was the case at many rural churches, as they would have no facilities for night-time services, so each person would often bring a candle themselves to help light the church during the hours of darkness. When they arrived at the church, it was lit with hundreds of candles placed only a couple of inches apart, making for a "brilliant" display. This sort of display was a key part of many local plygain ceremonies, as it left a strong impression in the written records that remain.

== Plygain today ==
The tradition continues in some areas of Wales today, especially in:

- Abergavenny
- Llanerfyl
- Llanfihangel yng Ngwynfa
- Llangynog
- Llanllyfni
- Llanymawddwy
- Lloc
- Mallwyd
- Oswestry (England)

Royal Mail released an 18 pence stamp to commemorate Plygain in 1986. In 2006, a recording of an early twentieth century plygain was discovered at the British Library by Wyn Thomas of the University of Wales, Bangor. The collection was of recordings made by Lady Ruth Herbert Lewis from 1910 to 1913, and included a plygain recorded in Drefach, Carmarthenshire, further south than previously thought. The BBC have noted that the services still exist in Montgomeryshire as recently as 2012.

Some parishes have incorporated Plygain observances into celebrations of the pre-Julian calendar Welsh New Year on the 12 January.

== Gallery ==
Plygain Carols at Llanfair Dyffryn Clwyd, North Wales; 2015
"Deffrown Deffrown!"

"Gwrandawed Bob Enaid"

"Awn i Fethlem"

"Blant Adda 'Mbaratowch"

"Ar Fore Dydd Nadolig"

"Pa Beth yw'r Golau"

"Carol y Swper"
