= List of Welsh-language programmes =

Wales has both radio and television channels in the Welsh language. This page lists some notable programmes transmitted on them.

== Television programmes ==
Television programmes originally made in the Welsh language or first shown only in Wales.

- 04 Wal
- 35 Awr
- 35 Diwrnod
- 100 Lle
- Adre
- BANG
- Byw Celwydd
- Byw yn yr Ardd
- Cafflo
- Con Passionate
- Cowbois ac Injans
- C'mon Midffild
- Caerdydd
- Cariad@iaith:love4language - broadcast since 2004
- Calennig
- Craith
- Cwpwrdd dillad
- Dal Ati
- Dechrau Canu, Dechrau Canmol
- Glan Hafren
- Gofod
- Ffermio
- Fideo 9 - music programme broadcast from 1988 to 1992.
- Gwydion
- Hacio
- Heno
- Hip neu Sgip?
- Jacpot
- Jonathan - Jonathan Davies show broadcast since 2004
- Llanw
- Y Llais
- Newyddion
- Noson Lawen
- Ochr 1
- Pam Fi Duw
- PARCH
- Pobol y Cwm - soap opera transmitted since 1974.
- Pwy 'dy Pwy
- Reslo - professional wrestling coverage 1982-1995
- Rownd a Rownd
- Storïau'r Henllys Fawr
- Stumiau
- Teulu
- Tipyn o Stad
- Un Bore Mercher
- Yr Afon
- Y Byd ar Bedwar
- Y Byd yn ei Le
- Y Clwb Rygbi
- Y Ditectif (The Detective) - factual crime series fronted by Mali Harries
- Y Gwyll (Hinterland) - crime drama
- Y Lle
- Y Pris
- Y Siambr - game show
- Y Stiwdio Gefn - music programme
- Wedi 7 - daily news programme, replaced by Heno in 2012
- Wynne Evans ar Waith

== Children's films and television ==
S4C has always had a strong children's broadcasting strand, many cartoons from which have later made the transition to channels in English and other languages.

- ABC
- Ari Awyren
- Siôn Blewyn Coch (1986)
- Beano and Friends find Stabec
- Bryn Seren
- Bwgan (1995-2004)
- Caffi Sali Mali
- Caio
- Cyfres y Dywysoges Fach
- Cariad Cyntaf (1988)
- Dennis a Dannedd
- Gwboi a Twm Twm
- Deri Deg
- Fflic a Fflac
- Gŵr y Gwyrthiau
- Hwre! Dyma Nodi
- Hotel Eddie
- Joni Trôns
- Joshua Jones
- Loti Borloti
- Llan-ar-goll-en (2013-2016)
- Lisabeth
- Ni a Nhw
- Mona y Fampir
- Miffi
- Mr. Men a Miss Fach
- Pingu
- Planed Plant
- Prosiect Z
- Rala Rwdins
- Sali Mali
- Sam Tân
- Sgerbyde
- SpynjBob Pantsgwâr
- Slici a Slac
- Stabec
- SuperTed
- Tecwyn y Tractor
- Teletubbies
- Thumbelina (1994)
- Y Blobs
- Waaa!
- Y Brodyr Adrenalini
- Yr Ŵy Pasg (1987)
- Yr Injan Fach Fentrus
- Y Dywysoges a'r Bwgan
- Wil Cwac Cwac

== Radio programmes ==
- C2, BBC Radio Cymru

== See also ==
- List of Welsh television series
