= Welsh Language Music Day =

Welsh music festival

Dydd Miwsig Cymru Welsh Language Music Day
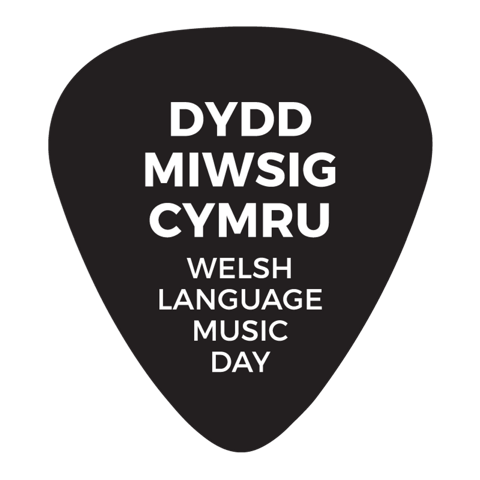
- Genre: Various
- Dates: 8 February
- Locations: Cardiff, Wales
- Years active: 2013–present
- Website: www.gov.wales

Welsh Language Music Day, often called by the Welsh name Dydd Miwsig Cymru, is a music festival founded by radio presenter Huw Stephens. Events take place on the day at its base in Cardiff, as well as previously in London, Swansea, and even as far as Brooklyn and Budapest.

== Etymology ==
Despite the Welsh language having words for 'music' (cerddoriaeth, cerdd or alaw), the colloquial term miwsic, borrowed from the English word music, was used instead to promote the event.

== Background ==
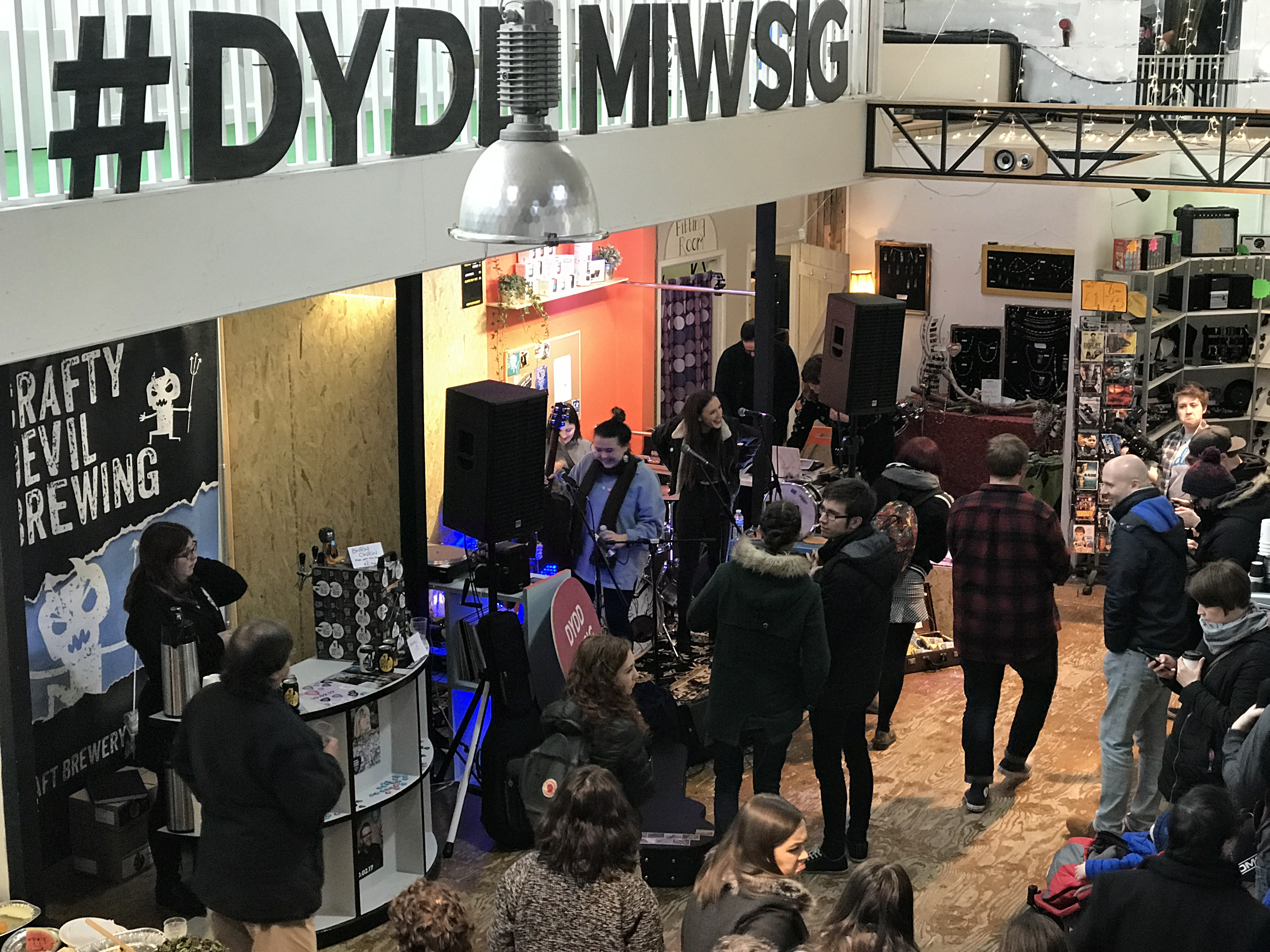
A photograph of the 2017 Welsh Language Music Day event at Castle Emporium, Womanby Street, Cardiff

The festival takes place annually in Stephens' hometown of Cardiff, Wales, as well as hosting events in other UK cities including London, Caernarfon, and Swansea. The first Welsh Language Music Day took place in February 2013. Artists who have been highlighted include Mellt, Gwenno Saunders, The Gentle Good, Chroma, Adwaith, Candelas, Meic Stevens, Los Blancos, and Alffa.

Organisations across Wales are involved in the yearly event, including Sŵn, BBC Horizons, Forté Project, Clwb Ifor Bach and Big Fish Little Fish.

== Venues ==
Events have been held across the UK, including venues in Cardiff as well as:

- Kings Place, London
- Clwb Ifor Bach, Womanby Street, Cardiff
- Castle Emporium, Womanby Street, Cardiff
- St John's Church, Canton, Cardiff
- Blackwood Miners Welfare Institute, Blackwood
- Whitehall, Pwllheli
- Tafarn yFic, Pwllheli
- Y Galeri, Caernarfon
- Clwb Canol Dre, Caernarfon
- Bangor University
- Venue Cymru, Llandudno

Independent events have also been organised by Menter Iaith in the following:

- Conwy
- Maldwyn
- Fflint
- Wrexham
- Sir Dinbych
- Ceredigion

== Acts ==
During each year's events, organisers research the streaming popularity of Welsh language music acts globally.

The 2018 event found the most popular Welsh artists on Spotify were:

1. The Joy Formidable
2. Super Furry Animals
3. Cate Le Bon
4. Catatonia
5. Iwan Rheon
6. Gwenno Saunders
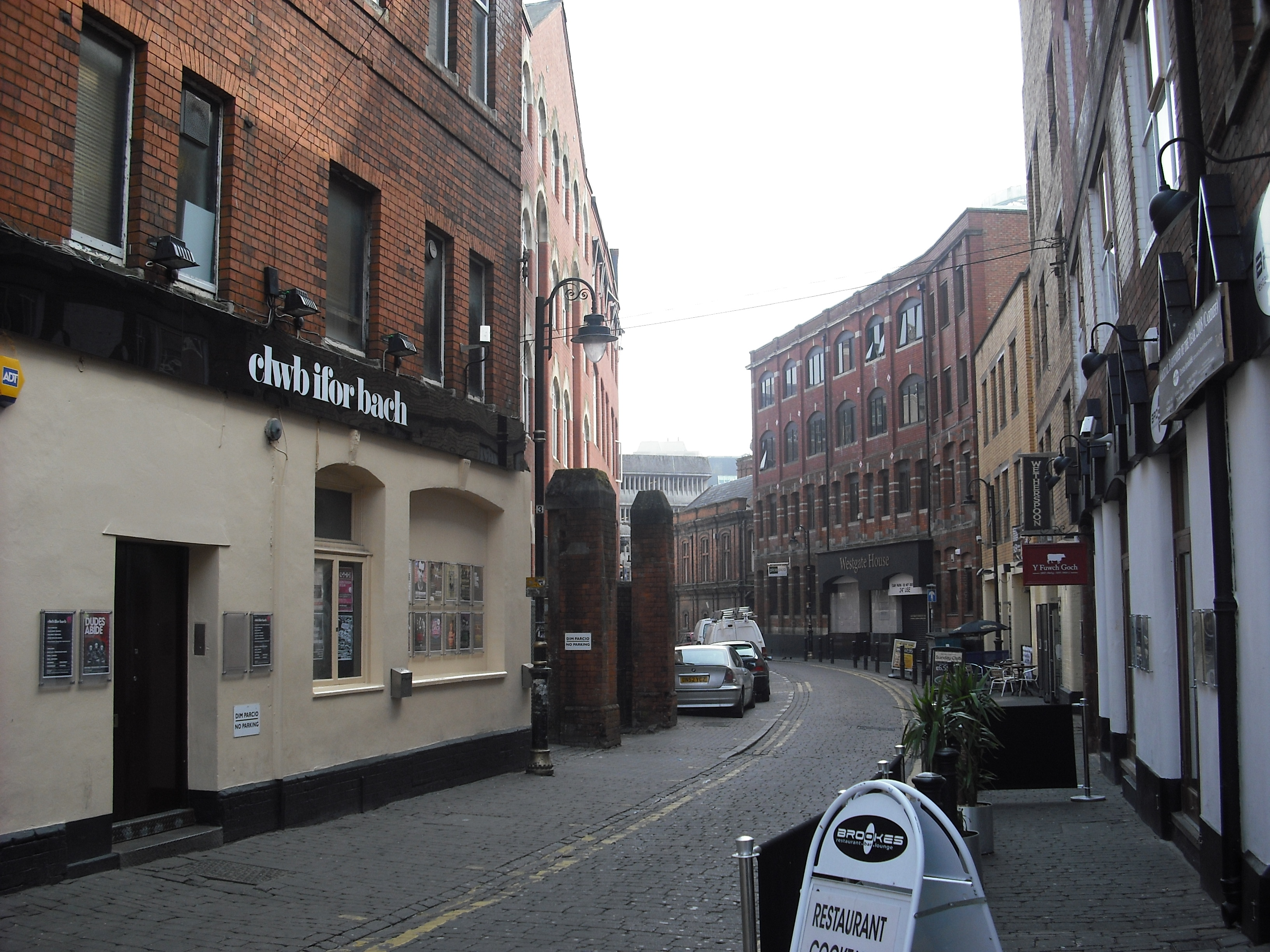
  Womanby Street Cardiff
7. Yws Gwynedd
8. Bryn Fon
9. Al Lewis
10. Sŵnami

The survey also found the following artists were most popular on Shazam:

1. Catatonia
2. Super Furry Animals
3. Gwenno Saunders
4. Casi
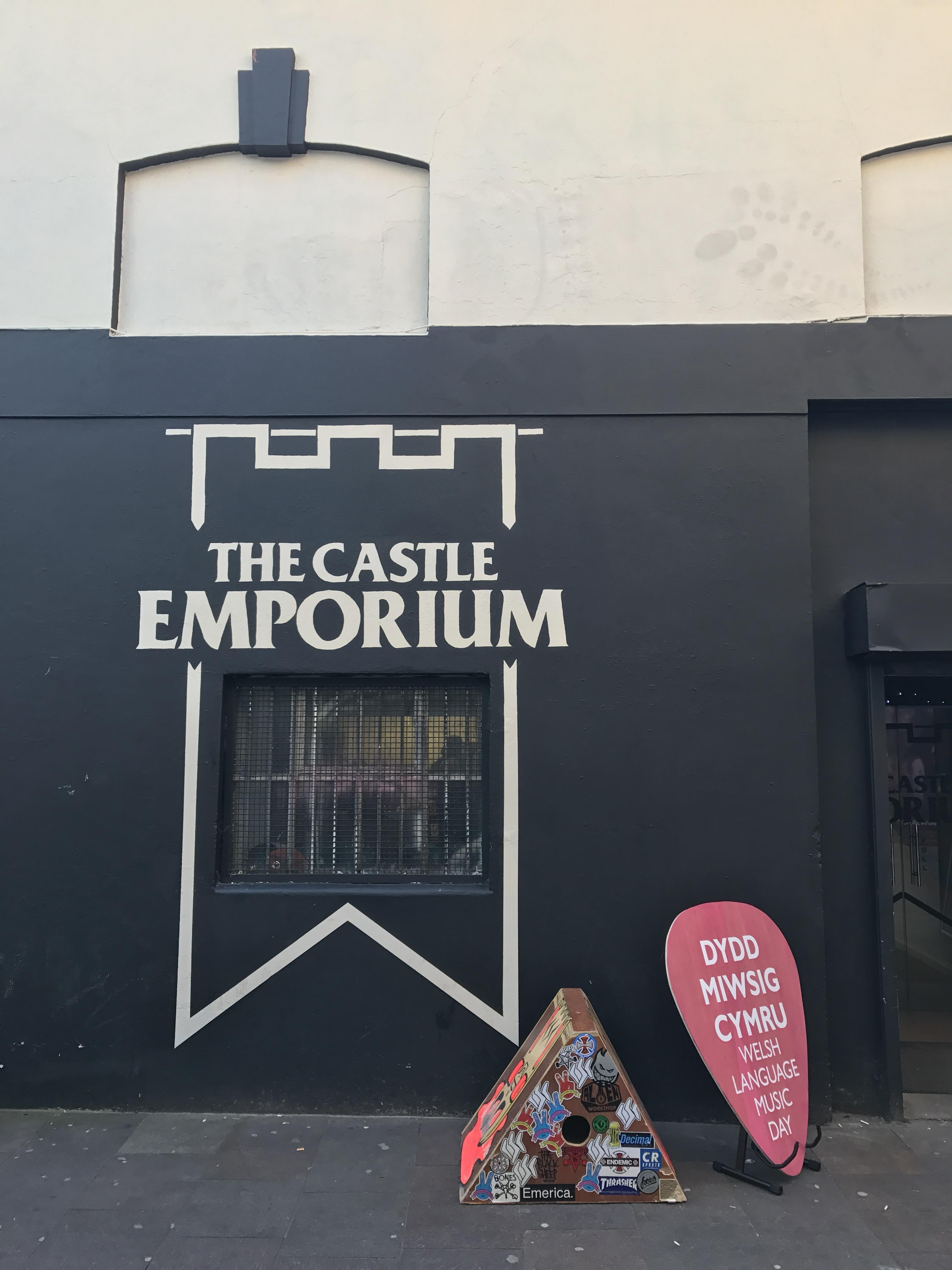
5. The Castle Emporium, venue for the 2017 edition of Welsh Language Music Day on Womanby Street, Cardiff
  Yws Gwynedd
6. Bryn Fon
7. Meic Stevens
8. Dafydd Iwan
9. Omaloma
10. Elin Fflur

== See also ==
- Culture and recreation in Cardiff
- Huw Stephens
- Music of Cardiff
- Music of Newport
- Music of Wales
- Welsh language
