= S4C Chwaraeon =

Welsh-language sports television channel

Logo of S4C Chwaraeon

S4C Chwaraeon (English: S4C Sport) is a Welsh-language sports television programming block, and brand extension of the S4C Welsh-language general interest channel.

== Main coverage ==
=== Rugby union ===
S4C's rugby coverage has been at the heart of the Saturday evening schedule for over a decade. S4C has joint rights, along with BBC Cymru Wales and Sky Sports, to broadcast matches from the Pro14, which it does under the Clwb Rygbi brand. Matches are generally shown on Sunday afternoons, and involve where possible at least one Welsh regional team.

S4C also have the rights to live matches from the conclusion of the SWALEC Cup and the Principality Premiership at club level, as well as the Welsh Autumn Internationals and Six Nations at international level. Highlights of the European Rugby Champions Cup and European Rugby Challenge Cup, as well as the French Top 14 are also shown.

BBC Cymru Wales produces most of the sporting coverage on S4C, as part of obligation to provide several hours of Welsh-language programming each week. In the past, the channel has shown action from the Welsh Premiership and Welsh-Scottish League.

Presenters include Gareth Rhys Owen and Lauren Jenkins, with punditry from the likes of Deiniol Jones, Andrew Coombs and Nicky Robinson.

=== Rugby league ===
S4C began its second foray into rugby league in June 2007, when they broadcast four Celtic Crusaders matches live starting with the home match against Barrow Raiders on Saturday 9 June 2007. The Crusaders are Wales' only professional rugby league club. The only other time that S4C have screened the 13-man code was when they showed all three of Wales' 1995 Rugby League World Cup matches where the Dragons progressed to the semi-final stage. These matches will be part of the first individual club deal with a television company in rugby league.

However, since the Crusaders selection for the Super League competition, this coverage has now ceased.

=== Association football ===
S4C broadcasts highlights of the Cymru Premier every Saturday night usually after the rugby coverage. The channel also shows live matches from the Cymru Premier, Welsh Cup, and highlights of Welsh internationals, as Sky Sports have the rights to live coverage. There is also coverage of selected European ties involving Welsh clubs. Coverage is shown under the Sgorio Cymru brand.

The channel also shows Sgorio, which broadcasts highlights of games from Serie A, Bundesliga and Primera Liga. The programme is broadcast on Tuesday nights, usually at 10.00pm.

For the 2010/11 season, S4C will broadcast live Saturday afternoon clashes from the Cymru Premier, as well as a results service covering football from the English League Pyramid and the rest of the Welsh club matches.

=== Harness racing ===
S4C broadcast action from harness race meetings during the summer in Rasus, broadcast on Monday nights. The programme usually consists of live coverage from meetings at Tir Prince Raceway in Towyn and the Amman Valley Trotting Club in Tairgwaith. Live coverage of the annual two-day Tregaron festival is also broadcast as well as highlights programmes from meetings at Aberystwyth, Caersws and Boughrood.

=== Rallying ===
Due to the Wales Rally GB, S4C bid for and won rights to broadcast highlights from each event of the World Rally Championship. Coverage is shown the Thursday after the event.

=== Cricket ===
From 2010, S4C will introduce coverage of county cricket from Glamorgan, including five live matches from the counties' Twenty20 matches and highlights from all other games. Live coverage will also include action from the newly formed Welsh Village Cup.

== Presenters ==
- Andrew Coombs
- Jonathan Davies
- Dylan Ebenezer
- Non Evans
- Lauren Jenkins
- Deiniol Jones
- Gareth Rhys Owen
- Nicky Robinson
- Amanda Protheroe-Thomas

== See also ==
- List of Welsh-language programmes
- List of Welsh-language media
- Sport in Wales
