= Wigwam (Welsh band) =

Welsh indie rock band

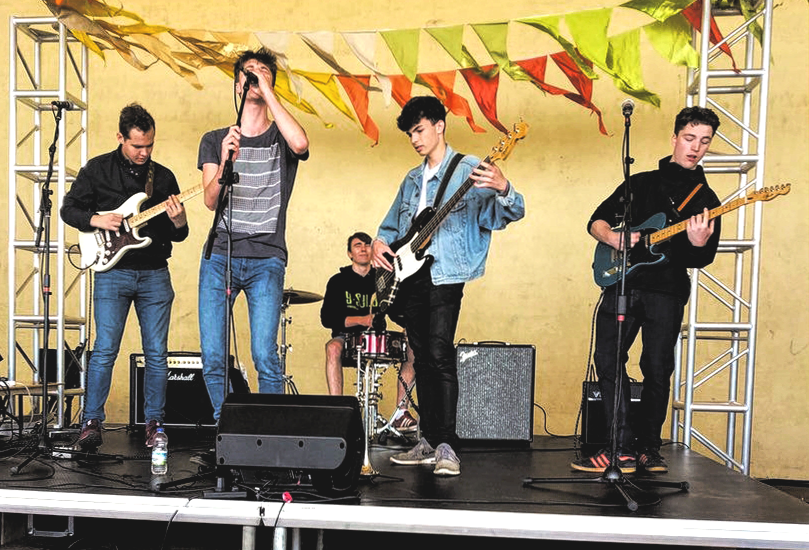
- Wigwam performing at Gŵyl Fach y Fro in June 2018

Background information
- Origin: Cardiff, Wales
- Genres: Indie rock
- Years active: 2017–present
- Label: JigCal
- Members: Daniel Jones; Gareth Scourfield; Griff Daniels
- Past members: Elis; Rhys Morris

Wigwam are a Welsh indie rock band from Cardiff. Originally forming at Ysgol Gyfun Gymraeg Plasmawr in order to play one concert, they composed a musical for the 2018 Cardiff National Eisteddfod. They released their debut album, Coelcerth, in 2018, along with a follow-up single in 2019. They released three singles in 2023, and announced an EP in July 2025.

== Career ==
Wigwam formed in 2017 at Ysgol Gyfun Gymraeg Plasmawr in order to play one concert at Clwb Ifor Bach four days later. After the concert, they decided to keep performing together. Wigwam released their first official single, "Mynd a Dod", on 6 July 2018. The song was recorded as part of a musical of the same name, also composed by the band, commissioned by the National Eisteddfod of Wales, the Arts Council of Wales, and Ysgol Plasmawr, and performed at the Wales Millennium Centre during the 2018 Cardiff National Eisteddfod. During the 2018 Eisteddfod, they also competed in Brwydr y Bandiau (Battle of the Bands) and reached the final, losing to Y Sybs.

Wigwam's debut album, Coelcerth, was released on 3 August 2018. Many of its songs were from the same musical as "Mynd a Dod". The band also released a follow-up single, "Rhyddid", in 2019. In January 2019, Wigwam were nominated for Best New Band or Artist at the 2018 Y Selar Awards. The same month, they were the topic of a session with Ochr 1.

In February 2023, after four years without releasing music, Wigwam released the single "Problemau Pesimistaidd". In July, they released the single "Billy", with the band's bass player, Griff Daniels, singing the vocals. In December of the same year, they released another single, "Trueni". Daniel Jones, the band's drummer, stated after the release of "Billy" that the band was hoping to release an EP.

On 11 July 2025, Wigwam released the double A-side "Cylched Yr Haul / Paid â Dod Nôl i Fi", and announced that they would be releasing an EP in the autumn of 2025. The EP, Paid â Gosod Larwm, was released on 28 November 2025.

== Musical style ==
Wigwam's music is inspired by bands such as The Beths, Alvvays, R.E.M, and Teenage Fanclub, and has been described as "jangle-pop". Y Selar described many of their singles, such as "Problemau Pesimistaidd" and "Trueni", as a "ffrwydrad" ("explosion"). Wigwam's music ranges from heavy rock and roll to lighter, slower songs.

== Members ==
=== Current members ===
As of July 2025.

- Gareth Scourfield (vocals)
- Griff Daniels (bass, vocals)
- Daniel Jones (drums)

=== Past members ===
- Rhys Morris (guitar)
- Elis (guitar)

== Discography ==
=== Albums ===
- Coelcerth (2018)

=== EPs ===
- Paid â Gosod Larwm (2025)

=== Singles ===
- "Mynd a Dod" (2018)
- "Rhyddid" (2019)
- "Problemau Pesimistaidd" (2023)
- "Billy" (2023)
- "Trueni" (2023)
- "Cylched Yr Haul / Paid â Dod Nôl i Fi" (2025)
