= Codi / \ Cysgu =

Studio album by Yws Gwynedd
- Released: June 2014
- Genre: Indie Rock
- Length: 32:39
- Label: Recordiau Cosh

Yws Gwynedd chronology
Codi / \ Cysgu (2014)	Anrheoli (2017)

Codi Cysgu (Wake up / \ Sleep) is the debut album of Welsh singer Yws Gwynedd and his band. The album was released 6 years after the last album of Gwynedd's previous band Frizbee who disbanded in 2008. They had achieved some level of success in Wales, having appeared several times on Welsh television and radio. Codi /\Cysgu contains songs written by Yws over a period of 15 years.

The album won Best Album at Y Selar awards in 2014, and was nominated for best Welsh-language album in 2015 at the National Eisteddfod in Meifod. The track "Neb ar Ôl" won best song at the Y Selar Awards in 2014. This album contains Yws Gwynedd's most popular song to date "Sebona fi" which was voted by listeners of Radio Cymru as the best Welsh-language song in 2016 and again 2017. As such it can be found alongside "Neb ar Ôl" on the compilation album "#40mawr" (big 40) that featured the winners of the vote.

== Track listing ==
All tracks are written by Yws Gwynedd.

No.	Title	Length
1.	"Sodla"	2:12
2.	"Codi / \ Cysgu"	3:21
3.	"Mae 'na Le"	3:02
4.	"Gola Ola'r Dydd"	3:10
5.	"O Gwennan"	3:31
6.	"Drwgfyw"	3:23
7.	"Dal Fi'n Ôl"	3:35
8.	"Neb ar Ôl"	3:35
9.	"Sebona Fi"	3:33
10.	"Cân Creulon"	3:17
Total length:		32:39
