= Ochr 1 =

Welsh-language music programme

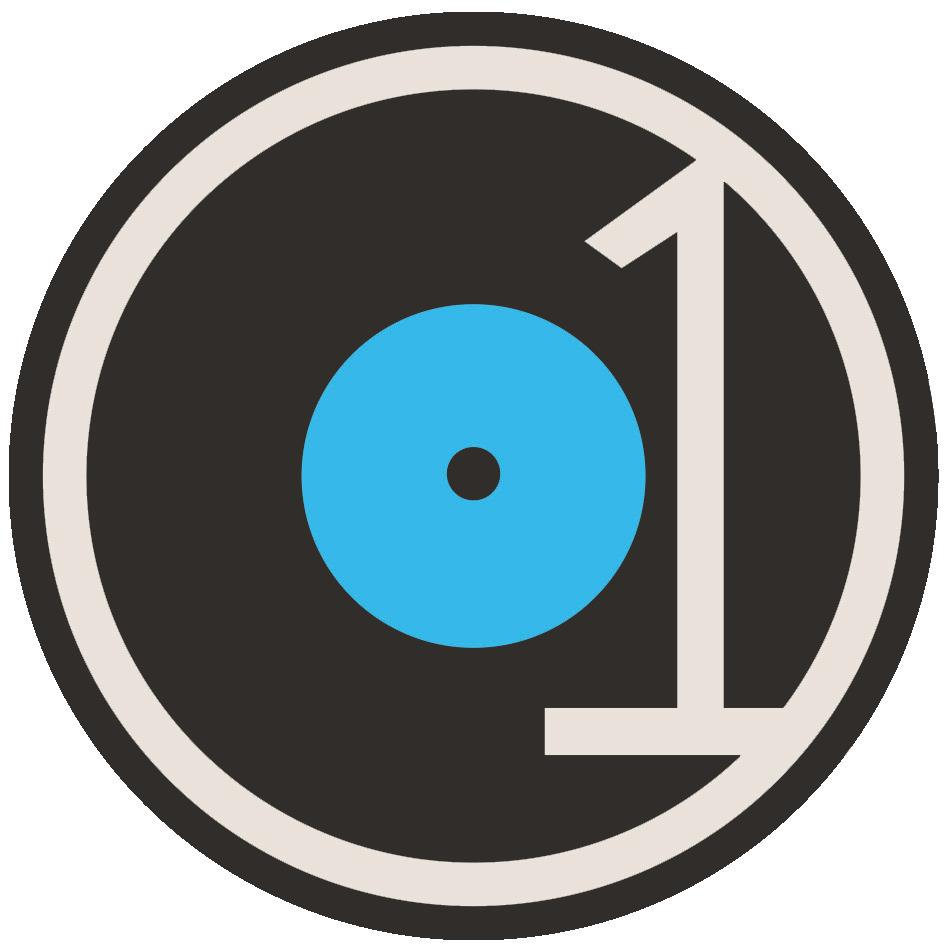

Ochr 1 was a Welsh language music programme on S4C, concentrating on current Welsh music of all genres. The series started in 2013 as part of Y Lle's culture themed programme for young people. It was presented by Griff Lynch and ran until 2017. Other staff included director and producer Elis Roberts.

The mixture of items included on Ochr 1 was live studio sessions by bands such as Sŵnami, Yws Gwynedd, Cowbois Rhos Botwnnog and Kizzy Crawford, videos directed by some of the up and coming directors in Wales, and interviews with artists of the Welsh music scene in different locations across the country. Popular artists such as HMS Morris, Candelas, Y Pencadlys, Gruff Rhys, Gwenno Saunders and Yr Eira made appearances on the show.

== Specials ==
As well as regular episodes, special programmes have also been broadcast, such as popular band Swnami's journey to play at Eurosonic Festival in Groningen, The Netherlands. The special included the boys' journey and a live performance. Also, a special about the imaginary pop group from the 1970s Saron – a project by Klep Dim Trep label. Ochr 1 decided to broadcast a programme as "a lost episode from the archive", Cil Y Drws, from 1974. The special included the group's history in their early days and a glimpse of what they recorded in the studio. It was a music comedy programme filmed in the same style as Welsh pop programmes in the 1970s such as Disg a Dawn.

Another special was Ochr 1: Aron Elias. Elias was lead singer of influential hip-hop band Pep le Pew. The programme covered his life after moving to live in a remote Andalucian cave in Sacromonte, Spain, with no electricity or running water. It covered his busking career, and how Elias initially got a job working in a hostel in the city, settling there after a year or so of travelling. But when that job became no longer tenable he ended up living in a small community of cave-dwellers whose makeshift homes overlook the magnificent Moorish palace Alhambra.

Ochr 1 was very productive in a number of Welsh festivals. In the weeks leading up to the Gwobrau'r Selar (Y Selar Awards), Ochr 1 produced and released videos on YouTube revealing the award shortlists, and on the night itself, recorded interviews with the winners and live performances. During the National Eisteddfod, Ochr 1 broadcast bands performing from the popular festival Maes B, as well as uploading live acoustic sessions and interviews with bands on the show's YouTube channel.
