= Terwyn Davies =

Welsh broadcaster

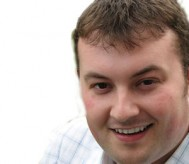
- Born: April 3, 1979 (age 46); Aberystwyth, Ceredigion, Wales
- Education: University of Wales, Bangor
- Occupations: Broadcaster and TV Producer
- Years active: 1995 – present

Terwyn Davies is a Welsh broadcaster (born 3 April 1979), who presents BBC Radio Cymru's farming and rural affairs programme, Troi'r Tir, and produces the daily Ifan Jones Evans show on the station.

== Early history ==
Davies was brought up in the Aeron Valley, Ceredigion, and was educated at Felinfach Primary School and then at Aberaeron Comprehensive School before studying communication at the University of Wales, Bangor and taking a post-graduate course in journalism.

== Radio Ceredigion ==
Davies joined the Radio Ceredigion presenting team in 1995, and presented various dedication, music and travel programmes, including a weekly two-hour country music show, in which he played country music from Nashville and Welsh country music artists.

== BBC Radio Cymru ==
In October 1999, whilst still at university, Davies joined the BBC Radio Cymru presenting team to co-presented Gang Bangor, a youth music programme, with Dylan Wyn and Owain Gwilym. In 2000, he acquired a new partner, Stephen Edwards, and both continued to present Gang Bangor, before it was replaced by C2.

Davies co-presented the late-night slot on C2 every Thursday and Friday between 11 pm and 1 am with Stephen Edwards and Jeni Lyn, and also on Saturday mornings between 10:30 am and 12:30 pm. Later, the slot was changed to a later time of 12:30pm to 2:00 pm, this time under the Steve a Terwyn branding. In October 2007, Steve and Terwyn' ceased to be broadcast.

Since 2020, Davies has presented the station's rural affairs and farming programme, Troi'r Tir. The programme broadcasts every Sunday at 7am with a repeat broadcast at 3.30pm.

== Television work ==
Davies has worked for independent TV production company Telesgop since 2001. He started as a researcher on the farming magazine programme Ffermio. Between 2005 and 2008, he worked as an interactive producer on the programme, responsible for the programme's website and interactive TV application.

Between August 2008 and May 2009, Davies presented and produced the Bwletin Ffermio programme every Tuesday and Friday at 1:30 pm on S4C Digidol. He went on to produce a new series for S4C called Bro (area), presented by Shân Cothi and Iolo Williams, visiting different areas of Wales every week.

In February 2011, Davies joined the Ffermio presenting team on S4C, while regular presenter Daloni Metcalfe took maternity leave.

== Writing career ==
Terwyn has also co-authored a number of autobiographical works published by Gomer Press. His writing has focused on documenting the lives of Welsh personalities, particularly figures connected to rural life and broadcasting.

His first book, Bywyd wrth Ben-Ôl Buwch (2014), was co-authored with his father, Aneurin Davies, and recounts Aneurin's experiences as an artificial insemination technician travelling around farms throughout rural west Wales. ISBN 9781848517189

In the same year, Davies co-authored Tommo: Stori’r Sŵn Mawr with his colleague, radio broadcaster Andrew Paul Thomas, also known as 'Tommo'. The autobiography documents Tommo’s career in Welsh-language broadcasting and his upbringing in Cardigan. ISBN 9781848518971

He later collaborated with Bryan Jones on O Ffyrgi i Ffaro: Hunangofiant Bryan yr Organ (2015), chronicling the life of a musician and rugby supporter from Ceredigion, Bryan yr Organ. ISBN 9781785620614
