= Gwilym (band) =

Welsh-language pop rock group

- Origin: Caernarfon and Anglesey, Wales
- Genres: Pop rock
- Years active: 2017–present
- Label: Recordiau Côsh Records
- Members: Ifan Pritchard; Llyr Jones; Llew Glyn; Rhys Grail; Carwyn Williams
- Website: facebook.com/GwilymBand

Gwilym (transl. William) are a Welsh-language pop rock group from Anglesey and Caernarfon. The band consists of members Ifan Pritchard, Llyr Jones, Llew Glyn, Rhys Grail, and Carwyn Williams. The group was founded in 2017.

== History ==
The band consists of members from across north west Wales, including Caernarfon and Anglesey. The members are currently based at universities in London, Birmingham, and Cardiff, but continue to travel together.

They released their first music video in July 2018, for their single "Fyny Ac Yn Ôl" transl. "Up and Back".

In 2018 the band were named at the Y Selar Awards (organised by contemporary Welsh language music magazine Y Selar) as Best Breakthrough Act. They won again in 2019, securing five awards, including:

- Band of the Year
- Best Song - Catalunya
- Best Video - Cwîn transl. "Queen"
- Best Artwork - Sugno Gola
- Best Album - Sugno Gola

Their 2018 album Sugno Gola transl. Suck Light was one of the first Welsh language albums to receive over 100,000 streams on Spotify. The title comes from the lyrics "Sugno gola, chwythu mwg" transl. "suck light, blow smoke" which appears in the song, "Llechan Lân" transl. "Clean Slate".

They performed at the Maes Stage at the 2018 Urdd Eisteddfod in Cardiff and the Ultimate World Festival, Aberdaron. They have toured venues in London, Cardiff, Aberystwyth, Carmarthen, and Llanrwst (for the Eisteddfod).

The band are inspired by artists including Muse, Super Furry Animals, Circa Waves, and Candelas, and were involved in the launch of magazine Lysh Cymru at the 2019 Urdd Eisteddfod.

They were named by BBC Cymru Wales and the Arts Council of Wales in the 2019 lineup for the Horizons Gorwelion annual festival.

== Discography ==
=== Studio albums ===
Year	Title	Label
2018	Sugno Gola	Recordiau Côsh Records
2023	ti ar dy ora' pan ti'n canu	Recordiau Côsh Records

=== Singles ===
Year	Title	Label	Album
2017	"Llechan Lân"	Recordiau Côsh Records	Sugno Gola (2018)
2018	"Cwîn"	Recordiau Côsh Records	Sugno Gola (2018)
2018	"Catalunya"	Recordiau Côsh Records	Sugno Gola (2018)
2018	"Fyny Ac Yn Ôl"	Recordiau Côsh Records	Sugno Gola (2018)
2019	"Tennyn"	Recordiau Côsh Records	
2019	"\Neidia/"	Recordiau Côsh Records	
2019	"Gwalia"	Recordiau Côsh Records	
2021	"50au"	Recordiau Côsh Records	
2022	"Cynbohyr (feat Hana Lili)"	Recordiau Côsh Records	ti ar dy ora' pan ti'n canu (2023)
2023	"IB3Y"	Recordiau Côsh Records	ti ar dy ora' pan ti'n canu
2023	"5:00"	Recordiau Côsh Records	ti ar dy ora' pan ti'n canu

== Awards ==
Year	Event	Award	Work
2018	Y Selar Awards	Best Breakthrough Act	n/a
2018	Y Selar Awards	Band of the Year	n/a
2019	Y Selar Awards	Best Song	"Catalunya"
2019	Y Selar Awards	Best Video	"Cwîn"
2019	Y Selar Awards	Best Artwork	"Sugno Gola"
2019	Y Selar Awards	Best Album	"Sugno Gola"
2020	Y Selar Awards	Best Song	"\Neidia/"
2020	Y Selar Awards	Best Video	"Gwalia"
2020	Y Selar Awards	Band of the Year	n/a
