= Y Selar Awards =

Welsh language music award

The Y Selar Awards (Welsh: Gwobrau’r Selar) are awarded annually for the best Welsh language rock and pop music, by the Welsh language music magazine, Y Selar. The awards ceremony is the only one specifically for Welsh language music.

== Background ==
The awards were first given out in 2010. Awards are given in ten categories, with voting taking place via the Y Selar website, until the publication date of the March issue of the magazine.

Every February since 2014, the awards event has taken place at a 'live' event at Aberystwyth University, initially in front of an audience of 500, increasing to 700 in 2015. The organisers claimed an audience of 1,000 in February 2016.

Nominations are invited until December each year, for the twelve categories, from which a long list is chosen by the awards panel. A public vote then takes place using a Facebook app.

== Winners ==
=== 2013 ===
Presented on 15 February 2014

- Best EP or Single - Du a Gwyn – Sŵnami
- Best Song - Anifail – Candelas
- Best Artwork - Llithro – Yr Ods
- Best Promoter - Nyth
- Best Music Presenter - Lisa Gwilym
- Best Solo Artist - Georgia Ruth Williams
- Best Live Event - Last Gig of Edward H Dafis, Denbigh National Eisteddfod
- Best Music Video - Gwreiddiau – Sŵnami
- Best LP - Candelas
- Best New Band or Artist - Kizzy Crawford
- Best Band - Candelas

=== 2014 ===
Presented on 21 February 2015

- Best EP or Single - Cynnydd / Gwenwyn – Sŵnami
- Best Song - Neb ar Ôl – Yws Gwynedd
- Best Artwork - Bodoli’n Ddistaw – Candelas
- Best Promoter - 4 a 6
- Best Music Presenter - Lisa Gwilym
- Best Solo Artist - Yws Gwynedd
- Best Live Event - Maes B, Llanelli National Eisteddfod
- Best Music Video - Gwenwyn – Sŵnami
- Best LP - Codi / Cysgu – Yws Gwynedd
- Best Musician - Lewis Williams (Sŵnami/Candelas)
- Best New Band or Artist - Ysgol Sul
- Best Band - Candelas

=== 2015 ===
Presented on 20 February 2016

- Best EP or Single - Nôl ac Ymlaen – Calfari
- Best Song - Trwmgwsg – Sŵnami
- Best Artwork - Sŵnami – Sŵnami
- Best Promoter - Maes B
- Best Music Presenter - Huw Stephens/Lisa Gwilym
- Best Solo Artist - Yws Gwynedd
- Best Live Event - Maes B
- Best Music Video - Sebona Fi – Yws Gwynedd
- Best LP - Sŵnami – Sŵnami
- Best Musician - Gwilym Bowen Rhys
- Best New Band or Artist - Band Pres Llareggub
- Best Band - Sŵnami
- Special Contribution Award - David R. Edwards

=== 2016 ===
Presented on 18 February 2017

- Best Song - Cyn i’r Lle Ma Gau – Y Bandana
- Best Artwork - Fel Tôn Gron – Y Bandana
- Best Independent Promoter - Maes B
- Best Music Presenter - Lisa Gwilym
- Best Solo Artist - Yws Gwynedd
- Best Live Event - Maes B
- Best Music Video - Sgrîn – Yws Gwynedd
- Best LP - Fel Tôn Gron – Y Bandana
- Best EP or Single - Niwl – Ffracas
- Best New Band or Artist - Ffracas
- Best Band - Y Bandana
- Best Instrumentalist - Osian Huw Williams
- Special Contribution Award - Geraint Jarman

=== 2017 ===
Presented on 17 February 2018

- Best Song - Drwy Dy Lygid Di – Yws Gwynedd
- Best Artwork - Achw Met – Pasta Hull
- Best Independent Promoter - Clwb Ifor Bach
- Best Music Presenter - Tudur Owen
- Best Solo Artist - Alys Williams
- Best Live Event - Maes B
- Best Music Video - Drwy Dy Lygid Di – Yws Gwynedd
- Best LP - Anrheoli – Yws Gwynedd
- Best EP or Single - Cadno – Cadno
- Best New Band or Artist - Gwilym
- Best Band - Yws Gwynedd
- Best Instrumentalist - Osian Huw Williams
- Special Contribution Award - Heather Jones

=== 2018 ===
Presented on 16 February 2019.

- Best Song - Catalunya – Gwilym
- Best Artwork - Sugno Gola – Gwilym
- Best Independent Promoter - Clwb Ifor Bach
- Best Music Presenter - Tudur
- Best Solo Artist - Alys Williams
- Best Live Event - Maes B
- Best Music Video - Cwîn – Gwilym
- Best LP - Sugno Gola – Gwilym
- Best EP or Single - Croesa'r Afon – Trŵbz
- Best New Band or Artist - Lewys
- Best Band - Gwilym
- Star of the Scene - Branwen Williams
- Special Contribution Award - Mark Roberts and Paul Jones

=== 2019 ===
Presented on 14/15 February 2020

- Best Song - \Neidia/ – Gwilym
- Best Artwork - Chawn Beans – Pasta Hull
- Best Independent Promoter - Clwb Ifor Bach
- Best Music Presenter - Tudur Owen
- Best Solo Artist - Elis Derby
- Best Live Event - Tafwyl
- Best Music Video - Gwalia – Gwilym
- Best LP - O Mi Awn Ni Am Dro – Fleur De Lys
- Best EP or Single - Lle Yn Y Byd Mae Hyn? – Papur Wal
- Best New Band or Artist - Kim Hon
- Best Band - Gwilym
- Star of the Scene - Yws Gwynedd
- Special Contribution Award - Gruff Rhys

=== 2020 ===
Held between 8–11 February 2021 on BBC Radio Cymru mostly, because of the COVID-19 pandemic

- Star of the Scene - Mared
- Best Artwork - Cofi 19
- Best New Band or Artist - Malan
- Best Solo Artist - Mared
- Best Song - 'Hel Sibrydion'– Lewys
- 2020 Prize - Eädyth
- Best EP or Single - Dim ond Dieithryn – Lisa Pedrick
- Special Contribution Award - Gwenno
- Best Music Video - Dos yn Dy Flaen – Bwncath
- Best Band – Bwncath
- Best LP - Bwncath II – Bwncath

=== 2021 ===
Presented on 17 February 2022

- Best Song (Sponsored by PRS) - Llyn Llawenydd – Papur Wal
- New Band or Artist 2021 - Morgan Elwy
- Star of the Scene 2021 - Marged Gwenllian
- Best Artwork (Sponsored by Y Lolfa) - Cashews Blasus – Y Cledrau
- Best Solo Artist - Mared
- 2021 Prize (Sponsored by Heno) - Merched yn Gwneud Miwsig
- Best EP or Single (Sponsored by Dydd Miwsig Cymru) - Detholiad o Ganeuon Traddodiadol Gymreig – Los Blancos
- Best LP 2021 - Amser Mynd Adra – Papur Wal
- Special Contribution (Sponsored by University of Wales Trinity Saint David) - Tecwyn Ifan
- Best Music Video (Sponsored by S4C) - Theatr – Sŵnami
- Best Band - Papur Wal

=== 2022 ===
Winners announced on Radio Cymru in February 2023:

- Best Song (Sponsored by PRS) - Eto – Adwaith
- New Band or Artist 2022 - Dom James and Lloyd
- Star of the Scene 2022 - Owain Williams (Klust)
- Best Artwork - Sŵnamii (album) – Sŵnami
- Best Solo Artist - Mared
- Best Short Record - Crescent – Thallo
- Best LP 2022 - Seren – Angharad Rhiannon
- 2021 Prize - Izzy Rabey
- Special Contribution - Lisa Gwilym
- Best Music Video - Drama Queen – Tara Bandito
- Best Band - Adwaith
