= Lisa Gwilym =

Welsh broadcaster (born 1975)

Lisa Gwilym (born 17 June 1975) is a Welsh broadcaster. She is best known as a presenter for BBC Radio Cymru 2 and the Welsh language television channel, S4C.

== Television ==
Gwilym began her career at S4C in 1998 as a continuity presenter for the Planed Plant children's strand.

In October 2001, she joined the S4C live teen magazine programme Uned 5 (Unit 5) as a presenter. During her time on the show, she took part in the 2003 John Cooper Mini Challenge. She also co-presented a special documentary with then-colleague Gethin Jones from Madagascar. Gwilym quit as presenter in December 2004, but stayed with the programme as a producer until 2006.

Between April 2008 and December 2009, Gwilym presented S4C's now-defunct flagship arts programme, Sioe Gelf, and its replacement, Pethe. In 2012, she was one of three presenters for the history series Darn Bach o Hanes. She also introduced ITV Wales's archive series Cofio and the live music series Y Stiwdio Gefn.

Gwilym has also presented and reported for S4C's coverage of the Welsh National Eisteddfod (in 2003, 2004 & 2009), the Brecon Jazz Festival, Sesiwn Fawr Dolgellau (Dolgellau's Big Session), Wakestock, the Tan y Ddraig (Dragon's Fire) concerts at Bryn Terfel's Faenol Festival and Hanner Cant, a music festival to mark the 50th anniversary of Cymdeithas yr Iaith Gymraeg. She has also been a live reporter for Children in Need's Welsh opt-out coverage and worked on BBC Radio 1's BBC Introducing opt-out in Wales.

Gwilym currently presents the long-running S4C religious series Dechrau Canu, Dechrau Canmol and the fitness reality show FFIT Cymru.

== Radio ==
In summer 2003, Gwilym joined BBC Radio Cymru to present a twice-weekly late night show for the station's C2 youth strand - broadcast live from BBC Cymru's studios in Bangor and including contemporary Welsh language music, features, news & interviews and listeners' texts & e-mails. The show ran until October 2007.

She went onto present early morning and weekend afternoon shows, and in November 2010, C2's flagship 8-10pm slot each weeknight. Following cutbacks in October 2012, she moved to a weekly three-hour show, broadcast 7–10pm on Wednesday nights, known as Lisa Gwilym yn Cyflwyno (Lisa Gwilym Introducing).

Gwilym joined BBC Radio Wales in 2016 as a cover presenter. Following the death of Alan Thompson in September 2017, she began presenting a late night show on Sundays, making her the only presenter with regular shows on both of the BBC's radio networks in Wales. She left Radio Wales in January 2021.

From February 2018 to July 2021, Gwilym also presented a Sunday morning breakfast show for BBC Radio Cymru 2.

In September 2022, she presented her final evening show for Radio Cymru after 19 years and returned to Radio Cymru 2 to present a daytime show from Monday to Thursday, which was expanded to a four-hour slot in March 2024.

== Awards ==
Gwylim won the Y Selar Award for Best Music Presenter in 2015. She won the Special Contribution award at the 2022 Y Selar Awards in February 2023.

== Personal life ==
Originally from Henllan in Denbighshire, Gwilym attended the village school and Ysgol Glan Clwyd in St Asaph, before studying psychology at Cardiff University.

She now lives in Y Felinheli with her husband, actor Llŷr Ifans. In late 2013, she gave birth to their first child.
