= C'mon Midffîld! =

Welsh television comedy series

- Opening credits
- Genre: Sitcom
- Created by: Mei Jones; Alun Ffred Jones
- Starring: John Pierce Jones; Mei Jones; Llion Williams; Bryn Fôn; Siân Wheldon; Gwenno Hodgkins
- Country of origin: Wales
- No. of series: 5
- No. of episodes: 31 (+2 specials)

Production
- Running time: 30–90 minutes (inc. adverts)

Original release
- Network: S4C
- Release: 18 November 1988 – 22 October 1994
- Release: 25 December 2004

C'mon Midffîld! is a Welsh television comedy series broadcast on S4C. Created by Mei Jones and Alun Ffred Jones, the show started life on BBC Radio Cymru in 1982 before being adapted for the screen by Ffilmiau’r Nant in 1988. It quickly became the most popular comedy series on S4C and led to various spin-offs including a stage play and a two-part 'Top 40 Moments' programme.

The show won a BAFTA Cymru for Best Drama Series in 1992, and despite coming to an end in 1994 is still repeated regularly on S4C.

== Summary ==
The show mainly revolves around the misadventures of Bryncoch United, a fictional village football team, which is based on Bont Football Club, a club based in the village of Pontrhydfendigaid (for which creator Alun Ffred Jones was a player). At the core of each episode are the activities of the team's committee: short tempered manager Arthur Picton, dim-witted linesman Wali Tomos, and down-to-earth captain Tecwyn Parri. Rounding off the main cast is Mr Picton's daughter Sandra and her "townie" boyfriend (later husband) George Huws, who also serves as the team's star player.

Most plots derive from the team's weekly football matches, community events, and trips away; all of which usually result in some form of misadventure. Recurring jokes included Wali's intolerance of his mother, Tecwyn's constantly angry wife Jean, and the fact that Arthur's (first) wife, Elsi, was largely an unseen character. One of the show's main story arcs was Mr Picton's disgust towards his daughter's relationship, and his ongoing struggle to accept George as a son-in-law.

Later episodes expanded stories to include the families of established characters and dramatic plots more prominently, such as the birth of Sandra and George's twins in 1992, the introduction of Arthur's brother in the 1993 Christmas Special, Wali's struggle when his mother is admitted to a care home in 1994, and the death of Arthur's wife and his eventual second marriage in 1994.

== TV Cast ==
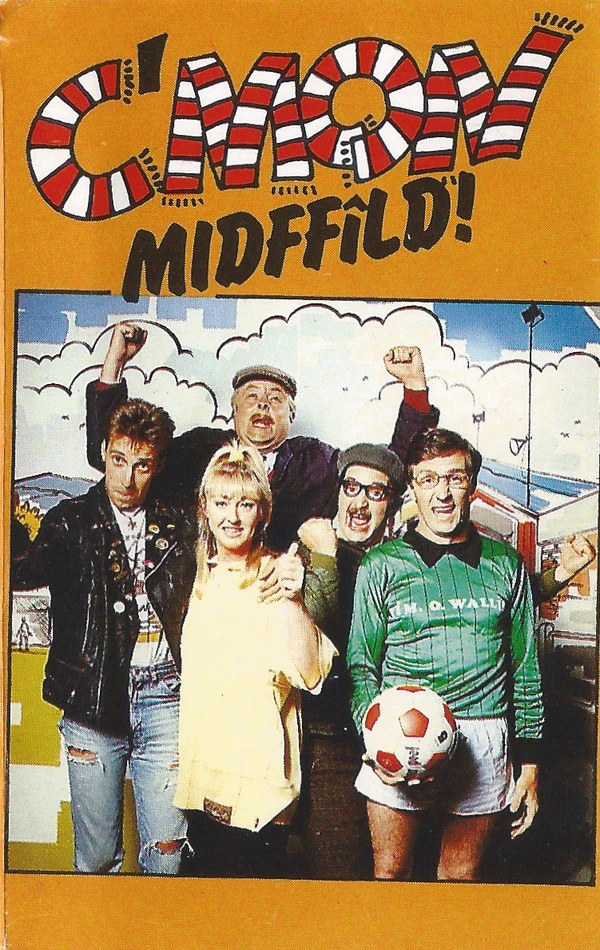
The core cast of C'mon Midffîld (Series 1-4 & Y Mwfi)

=== Main ===
Actor	Character	Series						
Actor	Character	1	2	3	4	Midffîld: Y Mwfi	5	C'mon Midffîld a Rasbrijam
John Pierce Jones	Arthur Picton	Main	Main	Main	Main	Main	Main	Main
Mei Jones	Walter "Wali" Tomos	Main	Main	Main	Main	Main	Main	Main
Bryn Fôn	Tecwyn "Tecs" Parri	Main	Main	Main	Main	Main	Main	Main
Llion Williams	George Huws	Main	Main	Main	Main	Main	Main	Main
Siân Wheldon	Sandra Huws (née Picton)	Main	Main	Main	Main	Main		
Gwenno Hodgkins	Sandra Huws (née Picton)						Main	Main

=== Recurring & Guest Leads ===
Actor	Character	Series						
Actor	Character	1	2	3	4	Midffîld: Y Mwfi	5	C'mon Midffîld a Rasbrijam
Bethan Gwilym	Jean Parri	Recurring	Recurring	Recurring	Recurring	Recurring	Recurring	Recurring
Catrin Dafydd	Lydia Tomos	Recurring	Recurring	Recurring	Recurring	Recurring	Recurring	Recurring
Stewart Jones	Osborne Picton					Guest		
Elliw Haf	Elen Picton (née Griffiths)						Recurring	
Gruff Pritchard (Note: A different actor previously portrayed Dafydd as an infant.)	Dafydd Huws							Guest
Lowri Price (Note: A different actor previously portrayed Gwenllian as an infant.)	Gwenllian Huws							Guest

== C'mon Midffîld a Rasbrijam ==
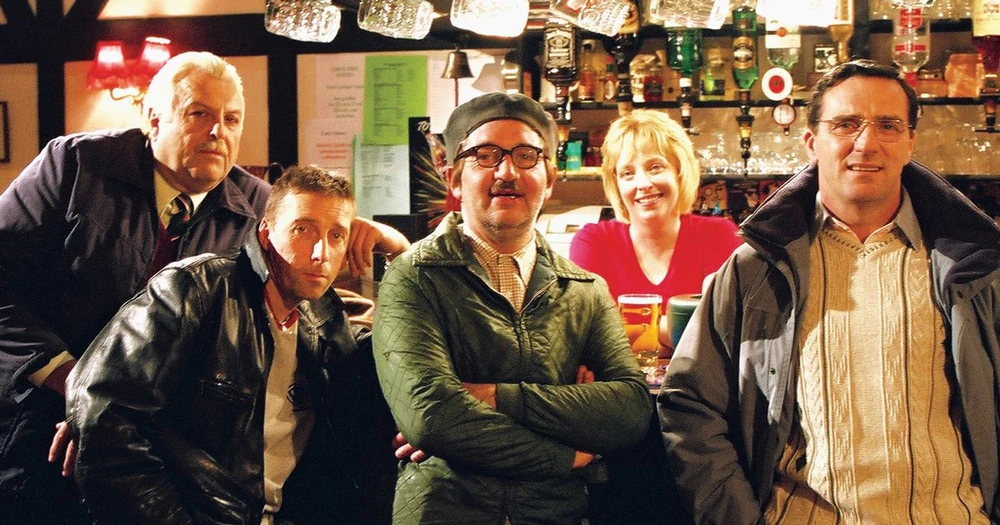
The core cast of 2004's C'mon Midffild a Rasbrijam

After a 10-year absence, C'mon Midffîld returned for a feature-length special on Christmas Day 2004 reuniting the main cast and featuring a second cameo by Welsh football hero Mark Hughes. The plot saw Sandra fall into a coma, prompting the rest of the original team (joined by George and Sandra’s children) to set off to Azerbaijan to fulfill her dream of helping an orphanage there.

The special was nominated for Best Film at the 2005 BAFTA Cymru awards.

== Team Members ==
Despite many of its members not featuring as named characters, Bryncoch FC's lineup was largely consistent for most of the series. It included Bryn Fôn as Tecwyn Parri (the team's Captain), Llion Williams as George Huws, Alan Williams as John Bocsar, Rhys Richards as Harri Pritchard, Mal Lloyd as Graham, John Hammond as Bryn Bwr Dwr, Geraint Eifion, David Owen, Huw Charles, Gerald Craig, Geraint Williams and Mel Fôn. Dewi Rhys also portrayed striker Bryan Fawr in two episodes.

== C'mon Midffîld vs Pobol y Cwm ==
At the Urdd National Eisteddfod in Nantlle Valley, 1990, the team played a charity football match against characters from Wales' longest-running soap opera, Pobol y Cwm in an event dubbed Brwydr Fawr Maes Dulyn.

== Episodes ==
=== Radio ===
Series	Start date	End date	Episodes
Pilot (Note: The original radio pilot featured a completely different cast, but the full series introduced John Pierce Jones, Mei Jones, Llion Williams and Siân Wheldon in the roles they would later portray on TV.)	23 January 1982		1
1	25 January 1986	1 March 1986	6
2	25 December 1986	29 January 1987	6
3	26 December 1987	30 January 1988	6

=== Television ===
Series	Start date	End date	Episodes
1	18 November 1988	23 December 1988	6
2	12 January 1990	23 February 1990	7
3	12 January 1991	16 February 1991	6
4	9 February 1992	15 March 1992	6
Midffîld: Y Mwfi	25 December 1992		1
5	17 September 1994	22 October 1994	6
C'mon Midffîld a Rasbrijam	25 December 2004		1

== See also ==
- List of Welsh television series
