= Mared Williams =

Welsh singer-songwriter

- Born: Llannefydd, Conwy Wales
- Education: Royal Academy of Music
- Occupations: Singer-songwriter, Actress

Mared Williams, known professionally as Mared, is a Welsh singer-songwriter from Llannefydd, Conwy, Wales. She won the 2021 Welsh Language Album Award and has won two Y Selar Awards.

== Life ==
Although she considered studying law, Mared studied music at the University of Leeds until 2018 and then a master's in musical theatre performance at the Royal Academy of Music. She had ensemble and understudy Eponine roles in Les Misérables in the West End in 2019. Mared joined the Welsh of the West End group during COVID-19 and performed in concerts including at the Royal Albert Hall. In a Britain's Got Talent performance with the group, Mared's vocals impressed the judges, with Simon Cowell saying that the group's performance was "exceptional".

In 2018, Mared won the Llangollen International Musical Eisteddfod’s International Voice of Musical Theatre. She then travelled to Australia to perform in the Gold Coast Eisteddfod's Musicale. In the same year, she came second in the "Can i Gymru" "song for Wales" competition, coming second with the song "Byw a Bod" ("living and being").

In 2020, Mared appeared in the "Dwylo Dros y Môr" ("hands across the sea") song which reached 15 on the iTunes chart. In 2021, Mared had re-joined the cast of Les Misérables (musical) in London's west end.

Mared won the 2021 Albwm Cymraeg y Flwyddyn ("Welsh Language Album Awards") for the album, Y Drefn ("The Order"), with I KA CHING Records label, announced live on BBC Radio Cymru. The album is bilingual and includes live sessions with the BBC National Orchestra of Wales. In response to her winning the award, Mared said "My heart is full! Thank you so much for making my year a thousand times better." “This album means the world to me and getting this response has been so special.”

In 2021, Mared won Y Selar's Award for Seren y Sîn ("star of the scene") award. In the same year Mared performed in the Online covid version National Eisteddfod of Wales, "Eisteddfod AmGen". She also appeared in an S4C episode of "Curadur". In 2021, she also appeared in the launch of the online Urdd National Eisteddfod, Esteddfod T. In the same year she appeared on Scott Quinnell's BBC Radio Wales Sunday programme to discuss her debut album.

In February 2023, Mared was announced as Y Selar's best solo artist of the year.

== Personal life ==
As of 2022 Williams was dividing her time between Llannefydd and London.

== Discography ==
=== Singles ===
Year	Title	Label	Album/ EP
2019	"Dal ar y Teimlad"	I KA CHING	Y Drefn
2019	"Y Reddf"	I KA CHING	Y Drefn
2020	"Over Again"	I KA CHING	Y Drefn
2020	"Pontydd"	I KA CHING	Y Drefn
2020	''Rhwng Bethlehem A'r Groes''	Côsh Records	
2021	''Llif yr Awr''	I KA CHING	
2021	''Pictures''		Something Worth Losing
2022	''Let Me Go''		Something Worth Losing
2022	''I Don't Wanna Know''		Something Worth Losing

=== Albums and EP ===
Year	Title	Label
2020	Y Drefn	I KA CHING
2022	Something Worth Losing	

== Theatre ==
Year	Title	Role
2018	Hwn yw fy mrawd	Ensemble
2019-2020, 2021-2022	Les Misérables	Ensemble and understudy Eponine
2023	For Tonight	Mrs Lewis/ Landlady
2023	Branwen/ Dadeni	Branwen
