= BBC Radio Cymru 2 =

Welsh national radio station

- Cardiff and Bangor; Wales
- Broadcast area: Wales
- Frequencies: DAB: 12D MuxCo (Mid & West Wales); DAB: 10D MuxCo (North Wales); DAB: 12D Now Digital (SE Wales); DAB: 12A Bauer (Swansea & SW Wales); DAB: 10D MuxCo (Wrexham, Chester & Liverpool); Freesat: 718 (Wales); Freesat: 735 (rest of UK); Freeview: 713 (Wales); Sky: 0130 (Wales); Sky: 0139 (rest of UK); Virgin Media: 913(all of UK)

Programming
- Language: Welsh
- Format: Freeform (Welsh)

Ownership
- Owner: BBC
- Operator: BBC Cymru Wales
- Sister stations: BBC Radio Cymru; BBC Radio Wales

History
- First air date: 29 January 2018; 8 years ago

Technical information
- Licensing authority: Ofcom

Links
- Webcast: BBC Sounds
- Website: www.bbc.co.uk/sounds/play/live/bbc_radio_cymru_2

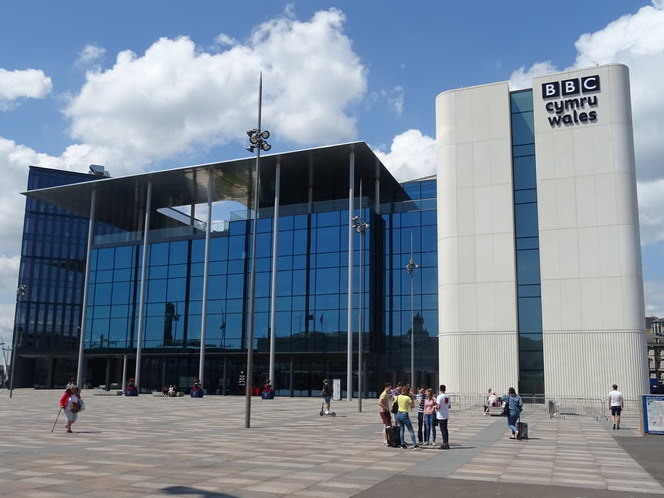
BBC Cymru Wales New Broadcasting House

BBC Radio Cymru 2 is a Welsh language radio station owned and operated by BBC Cymru Wales, a division of the BBC. It broadcasts across Wales on DAB, digital TV, and through the BBC Sounds app.

Radio Cymru 2 mostly broadcasts music-led programming for up to 60 hours a week (initially 15 hours a week until March 2024), as an opt-out from the main BBC Radio Cymru service, which provides shared programming at certain hours of the day. The station also simulcasts overnight programming from BBC Radio 2 after closedown.

The managing editor of BBC Radio Cymru is Dafydd Meredydd, a former presenter and producer for both stations.

== History ==
On 19 September 2016, BBC Cymru launched a pop-up radio station, Radio Cymru Mwy (Radio Cymru More), broadcasting for three months in the run-up to Radio Cymru's 40th anniversary. Consisting of five hours of music-led entertainment programming each weekday, Radio Cymru Mwy was available on DAB in south east Wales and online.

Six months after the station closed, BBC Cymru announced it would launch a permanent second station, Radio Cymru 2. The new service would air breakfast programming every morning on digital and online platforms, as a music and entertainment alternative to the main network, which aired the news programme, Post Cyntaf (later Dros Frecwast).

BBC Radio Cymru 2 began broadcasting at 6.30 am on 29 January 2018, initially offering a separate daily breakfast show.

The service was later expanded to carry regular additional sports commentaries - particularly on football and rugby - on midweek nights and at weekends, as well as occasional music-led special programming. Sports coverage on Radio Cymru 2 has since been discontinued.

On 4 August 2022, at the National Eisteddfod in Tregaron, the BBC announced plans to expand Radio Cymru 2's programming from 15 to 60 hours a week, offering "a Welsh language music-based schedule".

From 3 October 2022, Radio Cymru 2 aired an additional two-hour mid-morning show each weekday, presented from the BBC's Bangor studios by Lisa Gwilym on Monday - Thursday from 9:00-11:00 am and from Cardiff by Dom James on Fridays from 11:00 am-1:00 pm.

Upon the initial expansion of the station's schedule, Radio Cymru 2 has altered its music policy and now plays a greater proportion of English-language music, compared to the Welsh-led playlist on the main network.

The operating licence for Radio Cymru 2, as drawn up by the broadcast regulator Ofcom, requires the station to play at least 50% of Welsh language music, compared to a minimum of 66% on the main Radio Cymru service.

On 18 January 2024, and following a consultation, Ofcom gave approval for BBC Radio Cymru 2 to become a fully fledged radio station. The station launched its expanded schedule on 4 March 2024.

In October 2024, the station began simulcasting overnight programming from BBC Radio 2, including the weekday early show with Owain Wyn Evans, broadcast from BBC Cymru's headquarters in Cardiff.

== Transmission ==
BBC Radio Cymru 2 is broadcast across Wales on DAB. It is also available on Freeview in Wales, throughout the UK on Freesat, Sky, Virgin Media and online.

== Programming ==
BBC Radio Cymru 2 airs live, presenter-led programming from its Cardiff and Bangor studios at the following times:

- 7am to 2pm on Mondays to Thursdays
- 7–9am on Fridays and Saturdays
- 11am to 2pm on Fridays
- 7–10am on Sundays

The station airs a mix of automated non-stop music and pre-recorded 'curated' hours with guest presenters from 5:00–7:00 pm on Mondays to Thursdays, 5:00–6:00 pm on Fridays, 2:00–5:00 pm on Saturdays and 10:00 am to 9:00 pm on Sundays.

Outside of these hours, Radio Cymru 2 simulcasts programming from Radio Cymru during its transmission hours and BBC Radio 2 overnight after closedown.

The station also airs hourly news bulletins, simulcast with BBC Radio Cymru, throughout the day.

In addition, Radio Cymru 2 also airs regularly scheduled programming if additional sports coverage is broadcast on the main network.

=== Notable presenters ===
- Lisa Gwilym (Monday - Thursday daytime)

=== Notable past presenters ===
- Caryl Parry Jones
- Huw Stephens

== See also ==
- List of Celtic-language media
