= Clwb Rygbi =

1997 Welsh TV programme

- Clwb Rygbi title card
- Also known as: Y Clwb Rygbi (1997–2014)
- Presented by: Catrin Heledd; Cenydd Davies; Andrew Coombes; Lauren Jenkins; Nicky Robinson
- Country of origin: Wales
- Original languages: Welsh; (Alternative commentary in English available for some games)

Production
- Running time: Variable
- Production company: BBC Cymru

Original release
- Network: S4C
- Release: 1997 – present

Related
- Clwb Rygbi Rhyngwladol; Y Clwb Rygbi 13

Clwb Rygbi (Welsh for 'Rugby Club') is a rugby union Welsh-language television programme shown on S4C. Produced by BBC Cymru Wales, the show is amongst the most popular programmes shown on S4C. The show was known as Y Clwb Rygbi until the beginning of the 2014–15 season.

== Format ==
The show is presented by Gareth Rhys Owen with analysis provided by Deiniol Jones and Andrew Coombs and commentary by Gareth Charles and former Wales captain Gwyn Jones. Catrin Heledd and Owain Gwynedd are touchline reporters.

Clwb Rygbi's main coverage as of the 2015–16 season is of the Pro14, with a live game shown in every league round, where possible including a Welsh regional side. The Six Nations Championship is broadcast under the title Clwb Rygbi Rhyngwladol (Welsh for 'International Rugby Club'). Other international matches involving Wales, in particular, the November Test series, are also shown on Clwb Rygbi Rhyngwladol. Highlights of the Principality Premiership and the SWALEC Cup are shown, with the final of the SWALEC Cup being televised live.

Live Pro 14 games are usually shown on Friday afternoons.

The other rugby union competitions which S4C have the rights to show highlights for are broadcast as separate programmes, namely Rygbi: Cwpan Pencampwyr Ewrop for the European Rugby Champions Cup, Rygbi: Cwpan Her Ewrop for coverage of Welsh regions in the knockout rounds of the European Rugby Challenge Cup, and Top 14: Rygbi Ffrainc for the French Top 14. These programmes share some presenters and commentators.

English-language commentary is usually provided via a red button service, unless the rights to broadcast the match commentary in English is held by another broadcaster.

== Awards ==
The programme won a BAFTA Cymru Best Live Coverage/Outside Broadcast award in 1999 and in 2005.

In 2002 the programme won the Royal Television Society Regional Sports Programme of the Year award, becoming the first Welsh-language programme to win a RTS Sport Award.

== Y Clwb Rygbi 13 ==
A spin-off from Y Clwb Rygbi was announced on 30 May 2007 when S4C announced that they would cover four Celtic Crusaders rugby league matches live. The coverage started on 9 June 2007 when the Crusaders hosted Barrow Raiders at the Brewery Field at 6.30 pm. They eventually showed nine matches over two years.

== See also ==
- Scrum V, an English-language rugby union television programme also produced by BBC Cymru Wales.
- S4C Sport
