= Mei Jones =

Welsh actor and scriptwriter (1953–2021)

Henryd Myrddin Jones (1953–5 November 2021), known professionally as Mei Jones, was a Welsh actor and writer. He was best known for his part as Wali Tomos in the Welsh language sitcom C'mon Midffild! which he also co-wrote.

== Early life ==
As a child he was a talented footballer and was admitted to a Welsh under-18 squad while still a school pupil. He played for teams in Beaumaris, Amlwch, Bangor and was a goalkeeper for Llanrug. He played for the Pontrhydfendigaid football club during his college days in Aberystwyth.

== Career ==
Along with co-writer Alun Ffred Jones he won the BAFTA Cymru for best "Drama Series/Serial" for C'mon Midffild! in 1993.

He was also one of the Jones's who broke the world record for collecting the largest number of people sharing the same surname at the Millennium Centre in 2006, being one of the 1,224 Jones who took part, in the event known as 'Jones Jones Jones'.

== Arrest ==
Jones and fellow C'Mon Midffild! cast-member, Bryn Fôn were detained in 1990 along with 2 other people following the investigation into the campaign of holiday home fires set by the Welsh nationalist movement Meibion Glyndŵr. No charges were brought against the four.
