= Cardiff Festivals =

Set of festivals held in Cardiff, Wales

Cardiff Festivals are a series of festivals held in the capital of Wales, Cardiff and nearby areas every summer. The festival started back in the 1980s and are organised by several associations.

The festivals include:

- Velothon Wales
- Extreme Sailing Series
- Cardiff Triathlon
- Tafwyl
- Cardiff International Food and Drink Festival
- Welsh Proms
- Cardiff Carnival
- Pride Cymru
