= John Pierce Jones =

Welsh actor (born 1946)

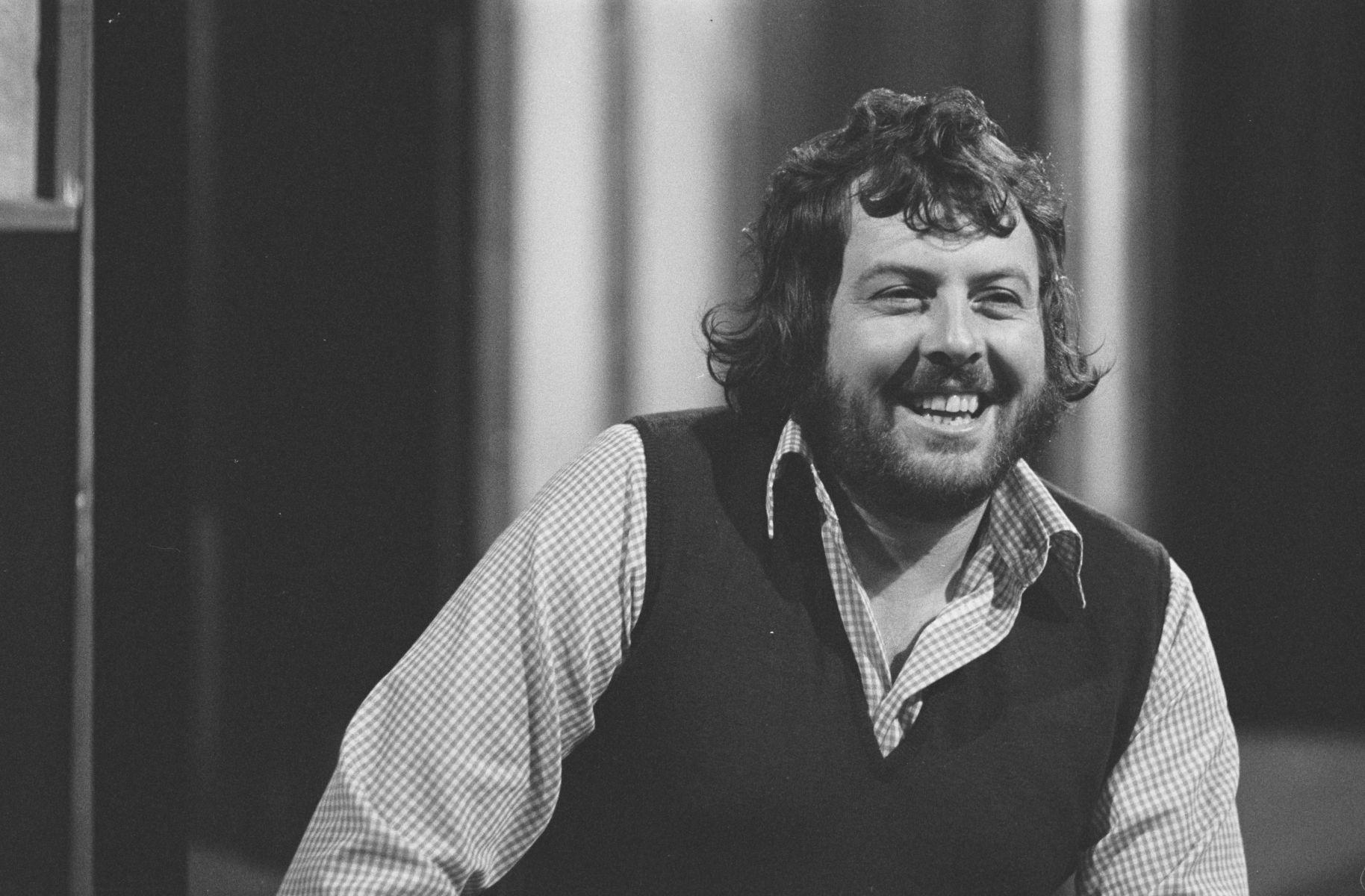
- John Pierce Jones
- Born: 10 May 1946 (age 79); Wales
- Occupation: Actor
- Spouse: Inge Hansen

John Pierce Jones (born 10 May 1946) is a Welsh actor.

== Career ==
Jones is best known for his role as Arthur Picton in the Welsh language sitcom C'Mon Midffild! He has also appeared in the Only Fools and Horses episode "The Miracle of Peckham" as Biffo and the Blackadder episode "Money" as Arthur the Sailor.

== Personal life ==
He is married to American Inge Hansen, who has learned Welsh, and they adopted a son from Haiti in 2004.
