= Yws Gwynedd =

Band from North Wales

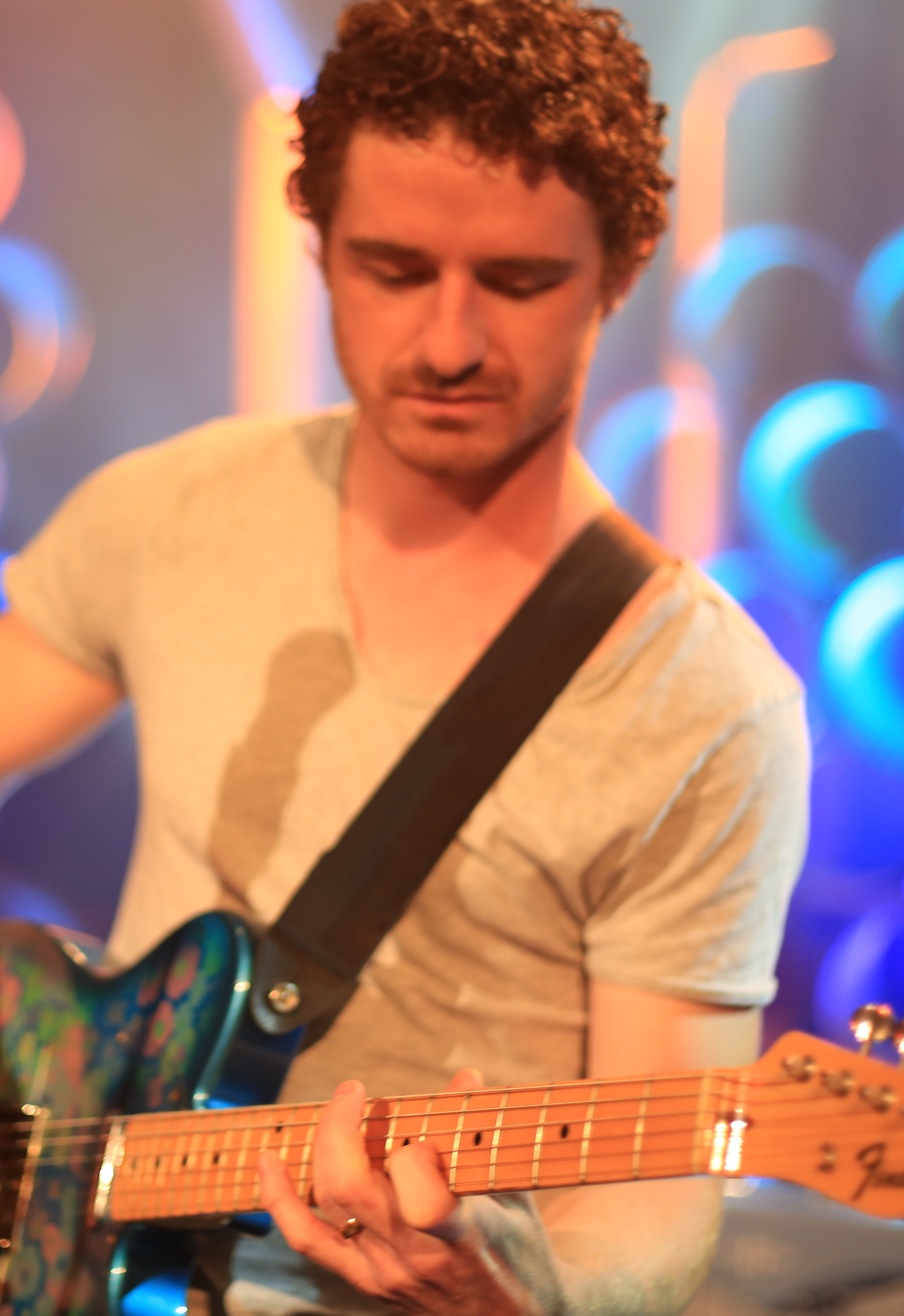

Background information
- Origin: Gwynedd, Wales
- Genres: Indie Rock, Rock
- Years active: 2014–2017, 2020–present
- Label: Recordiau Côsh Records
- Members: Ywain Gwynedd; Ifan Davies; Emyr Prys Davies; Rich Roberts

Yws Gwynedd (Welsh pronunciation: [ˈɨ̞ws ɡwɨ̞ˈnɛð]) is a Welsh rock band from North Wales named for its lead singer Ywain Gwynedd.

== Career ==
The band achieved acclaim after their debut album Codi / \ Cysgu ("wake-up /\ sleep" in Welsh) in 2014 which won Best LP at Y Selar music awards that year and was nominated for best Welsh-language album at the Eisteddfod in 2015.

Their second album was released in 2017 having been recorded in two weeks. It was nominated for the 2017 Welsh-language album of the year award. and won the best album at Y Selar's awards.

The band perform regularly at Welsh music events and have headlined festivals such as Tafwyl and Maes B. In 2015 they performed at Festival Number 6 on the Clough stage and returned in 2017. They have performed on S4C and Radio Cymru multiple times.

One of the band's guitarists, Ifan Davies, is also the lead singer of the band Sŵnami.

"Perta" (originally called "Hi yw y Berta"), the Welsh entry for the Junior Eurovision Song Contest 2018, is written by lead singer Ywain. It was chosen internally by S4C and was performed by Manw, the winner of the national final of S4C's Chwilio am Seren. Gwynedd has said that the lyrics were written with a focus on sounding nice to non-Welsh speakers, as well as being easy for viewers to sing along to.

In 2025 and 2026, Gwynedd was one of the coaches in Y Llais, a Welsh-language version of The Voice UK.

The band also voiced the character "Helping Hand" in the animated children's series Pop Paper City.

== #40Mawr ==
#40mawr is a radio programme and compilation CD of the 40 most popular Welsh-language songs as voted for by listeners of Radio Cymru each year. In 2016 the band's song "Sebona Fi" topped the #40Mawr chart and "Neb ar Ôl" came 35th. The next year "Sebona Fi" and " Drwy dy Lygid Di" featured on the updated list in first and 33rd place respectively.

== Discography ==
=== Singles ===
Title	English translation	B-side	Release	From Album	Notes
"Fy Nghariad Gwyn"	"My Blessed Love"	n/a	2014	n/a	Christmas single
"Dy Anadl Di"	"Your Breath"	"Pan Ddaw Yfory" ("When Tomorrow Comes")	2015	n/a	
"Hogia Ni"	"Our Boys"	"All the Way"	2016	n/a	Collaboration with Gwerinos
"Sgrîn"	"Screen"	n/a	2016	Anrheoli	
"Anrheoli"	"Unmanage"	n/a	2016	Anrheoli	
"Deryn Du"	"Black Bird"	n/a	2020	n/a	First single in four years
"Ni Fydd Y Wal"	"We will be the wall"	n/a	2021	n/a	written as Radio Cymru's signature song for the Euros 2020
"Dau Fyd"	"Two Worlds"	n/a	2022	n/a	
"Dal Fi Lawr"	"Hold Me Down"	n/a	2023	n/a	Collaboration with Alys Williams
“Charrango”		n/a	2023	n/a	
"Summer's Day"	n/a		2023	Tra Dwi'n Cysgu	
"Bae"	"Bay"		2024	Tra Dwi'n Cysgu	
"Dolig Yma"	"This Christmas"		2025	n/a	Christmas single

=== Albums ===
Title	Length	Format	Label	Release
Codi / \ Cysgu	32'39"	CD, download, streaming	Recordiau Côsh Records	2014
Anrheoli	32'20"	CD, download, streaming	Recordiau Côsh Records	2017
Tra Dwi'n Cysgu	32'55"	download, streaming		2024

== Compilation albums ==
	Title	English translation	Yws Gwynedd Tracks	Note
2015	#40Mawr	#Big40	"Sebona Fi" at #5 "Neb Ar Ol" at #25	Radio Cymru vote-based tracklist
2016	#40Mawr	#Big40	"Sebona Fi" at #1 "Neb Ar Ol" at #35	Radio Cymru vote-based tracklist
2017	#40Mawr	#Big40	"Sebona Fi" at #1 "Drwy Dy Lygid Di" at #33	Radio Cymru vote-based tracklist
2019	#40Mawr	#Big40	"Sebona Fi" at #1 "Drwy Dy Lygid Di" at #27	Radio Cymru vote-based tracklist
