= Candelas (band) =

Welsh rock band

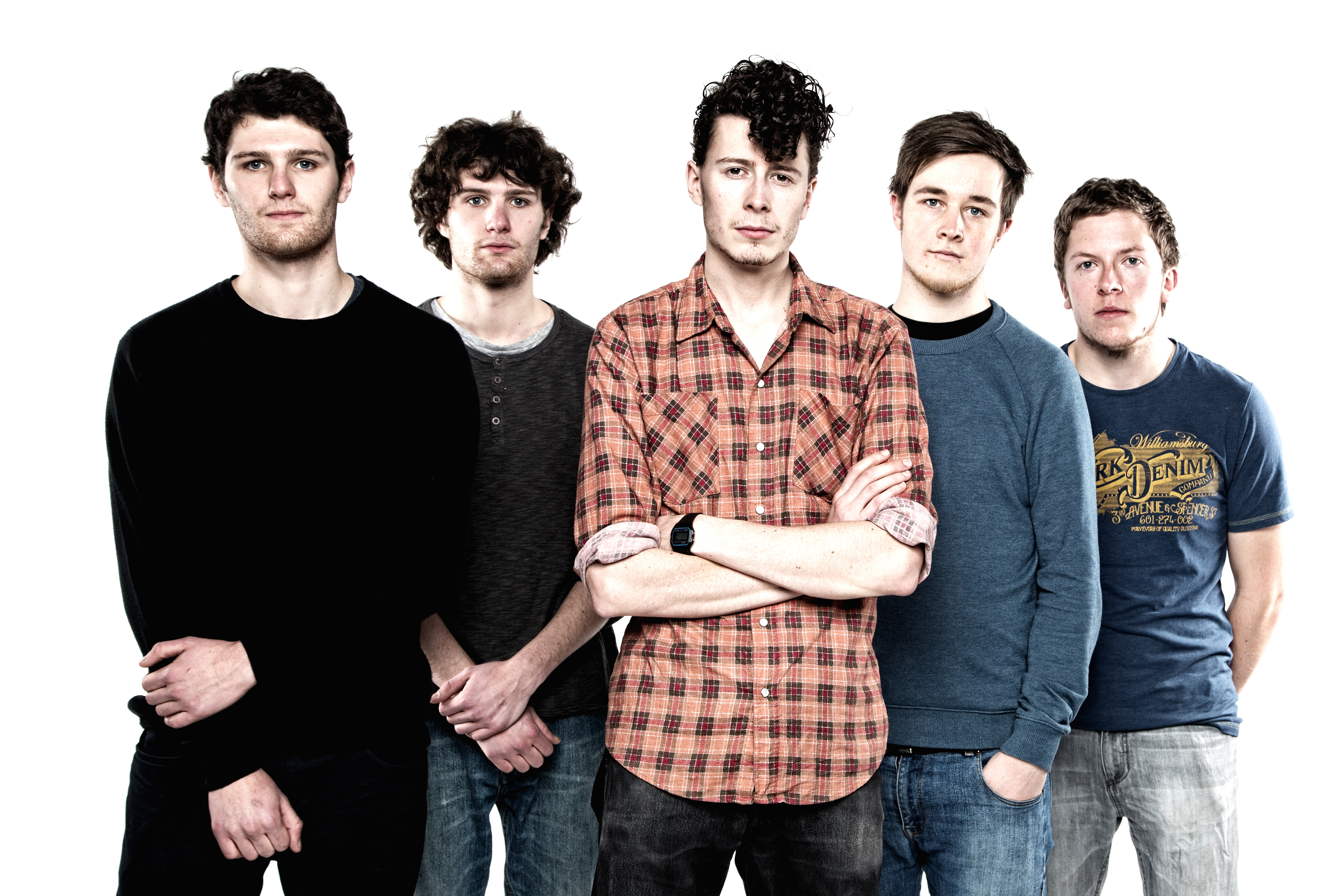

Background information
- Origin: Llanuwchllyn, Gwynedd, Wales
- Genres: Indie rock
- Years active: 2009–present
- Label: I Ka Ching (2014–present)
- Members: Osian Williams; Ifan Jones; Gruffydd Edwards; Tomos Edwards; Lewis Williams

Candelas are a Welsh rock band from Llanuwchllyn, North Wales.

== Background ==
Candelas released their first EP Kim Y Syniad in 2011. Since being signed to the label I Ka Ching in 2013 they have released two albums and three singles. Their first album featured songs in both Welsh and English and their second album is entirely sung in Welsh. In February 2014, the band won three Y Selar awards for best Welsh language song, best long record and best band. They won best Welsh language band again in February 2015, also winning the best artwork prize. Their album Bodoli'n Ddistaw was shortlisted for the 2015 Welsh-language album of the year.

In 2016 the band recorded a cover of Yr Anhrefn's Rhedeg i Paris (Running to Paris in English), described as the "anthem of the Summer", to celebrate the Wales football team reaching the European Football Championship.

The band have played at numerous music festivals across Wales such as Festival Number 6, Maes B, and Tafwyl which they headlined in 2016 and again in 2017 after Bryn Fôn pulled out.

In 2017, the band were reported to be recording their first English-language EP and a third album, which was released in 2018 titled Wyt Ti'n Meiddio Dod i Chwarae following two singles.

The band's drummer, Lewis Williams, won best instrumentalist at the 2013 Y Selar awards for his work in Candelas and Sŵnami.

== Discography ==
=== Singles ===
Title	English translation	Year released
"Cynt a’n Bellach"	Faster and Further	2014
"Dim Cyfrinach"	No Secret	2014
"Ddoe, Heddiw, a 'Fory"	Yesterday, Today, and Tomorrow	2017
"Gan Bo Fi'n Gallu"	Because I Can	2018
"O! Mor Effeithiol"	Oh! So Effective	2018

=== Albums and EPs ===
Title	English translation	Length	Label	Released
Kim Y Syniad (EP)	Kim the Idea	19:40	Peno Productions	2011
Candelas	N/A	44:33	Peno Productions	2013
Bodoli'n Ddistaw	Existing Quietly	39:56	I Ka Ching	2014
Wyt Ti'n Meiddio Dod I Chwarae?	Do You Dare to Come Play?	54:12	I Ka Ching	2018
