= Bwncath =

Welsh folk group

Bwncath (Welsh for 'buzzard') is a Welsh rock-folk or contemporary folk band from Caernarfon.

== History ==
The four-member band was formed in 2014. The main singer, Elidyr Glyn, won the Alun Sbardun Huws trophy in the Eisteddfod Genedlaethol 2016 for composing the song Curiad Y Dydd. Glyn is also known for winning Cân i Gymru ("Song for Wales") in 2019, with the song Fel Hyn 'Da Ni Fod.

The band were described as the busiest and one of the most popular bands in Wales in 2022, performing over 100 gigs and booked to perform every weekend until July 2023. They headlined Saturday in Tafwyl that year. In 2023, Bwncath was described as one of the highlights of "Fel 'Na Mai" ("That's how it is") rock festival in Pembrokeshire.

In November 2023, bass guitarist and teacher Alun Williams was charged by North Wales Police with sexual communication with a child, but was acquitted in April 2024 after the prosecution offered no evidence at trial. In response to the original allegation, Bwncath had announced that Williams would not participate in the band's future performances.

== Members ==
- Elidyr Glyn - guitarist, lead vocals
- Robin Llwyd - guitarist
- Twm Ellis - drums, percussion

== Performances ==
Bwncath has performed live in events across Wales including the National Eisteddfod of Wales, Eisteddfod yr Urdd, Caernarfon Food Festival, Gŵyl Rhuthun, and Gŵyl Fach y Fro. They have also appeared on Noson Lawen on S4C.

== Label ==
Bwncath's music is published via the label Rasal.

== Albums ==
- Bwncath (2017)
- Bwncath II (2020)
- Bwncath III (2025)
