= Shân Cothi =

Welsh singer-songwriter, television and radio presenter

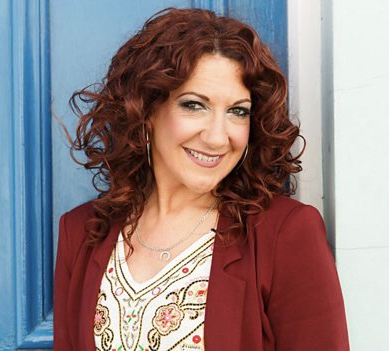
- Born: Shân Margaretta Morgan; 25 October 1965 (age 60); Ffarmers, Carmarthenshire, Wales
- Education: Aberystwyth University; University of Wales, Lampeter
- Occupations: Singer; television presenter; radio presenter; actress; voiceover narrator
- Years active: 1995–present
- Employer: BBC
- Spouse: Huw Justin Smith (m. 2007; died 2007)
- Musical career
- Genres: Opera; Classical; Oratorio; Operetta
- Instrument: Vocals
- Labels: Acapela; Sain
- Website: www.shancothi.co.uk

Shân Margaretta Morgan (born 25 October 1965), known professionally as Shân Cothi, is a Welsh singer-songwriter, television and radio presenter.

== Early life ==
Cothi was born in Ffarmers, Carmarthenshire, the younger of two children of Dai and Joan Morgan. She was known locally as "Shân y Gof" (English: "Shân the Blacksmith") owing to her father's job as a blacksmith. Cothi adopted her stage name when she was one of two Shân Morgans competing in the Cardigan Eisteddfod as a child. She later graduated in music and drama from Aberystwyth University and subsequently trained to become a music teacher at secondary level. She has since been honoured with fellowships from both Aberystwyth University and the University of Wales, Lampeter.

Cothi began her teaching career as Head of Music at Caereinion High School in Llanfair Caereinion, before moving to Ysgol Gymraeg Ystalyfera Bro Dur in Ystalyfera. Cothi then took early retirement to concentrate on her singing career.

In 1995 she won the Blue Riband prize at the Abergele National Eisteddfod which prompted her to turn professional.

== Career ==
Between 1998 and 1999, Cothi presented her own self-titled television series for S4C which ran for two series. It won a BAFTA Cymru award and was nominated for the best music programme at the Montreaux Festival.

Between 2000 and 2001, Cothi played the role of Carlotta in The Phantom of the Opera, from Andrew Lloyd Webber's production. She performed at Her Majesty's Theatre in London's West End; a role she held for fifteen months with critical acclaim.

Cothi's soprano voice has made way to an array of opportunities for the singer, and has performed and travelled throughout the world in a variety of venues. Ranging from the Royal Albert Hall in London, to the Kowloon Shangri-La in Hong Kong, China.

For three series, Cothi presented her own classical music show, Cothi's Classics for BBC Radio Wales.

Between 2005 and 2008, Cothi played the role of Davina Roberts, the conductor of "Côr Meibion Gwili" in Con Passionate, a Welsh language drama series on S4C. The show was a success; it won several BAFTA awards and won first prize at the Rose d'Or awards, the first Welsh language programme to do so. It ran for three series.

In 2008, Cothi participated in the Faenol Festival, dueting with Sir Bryn Terfel and Michael Ball in front of 10,000 people.

Between 2009 and 2012, Cothi co–presented a documentary series for S4C with Iolo Williams, called Bro. The series saw them travel all over Wales getting to know different areas through its people, its landscape and its history. It ran for three series.

In 2009, Cothi presented her own self-titled Saturday night musical entertainment show. The six-part series ran for one series.

In 2010, Cothi co–presented Y Porthmon with Ifan Jones Evans. The week long program broadcast live programmes reenacting and celebrating the journey of the last drover in Wales. It returned in 2011 with both presenters. The second series followed Y Goets Fawr (English: "The Stagecoach") which saw both presenters travel from Oswestry along the historic route from London to Holyhead, stopping for an evening of entertainment at five places along the way.

In 2012, Cothi co–presented Y Sipsiwn with Ifan Jones Evans. The series highlighted the Gypsy community, its traditions, music and culture, and the persecution and prejudice they endured. Both presenters travelled across Wales and followed the old Welsh Romany gypsy route from Llangrannog to Rosebush. In 2012, Cothi also presented Llais i Gymru, a Welsh–language singing competition with the aim of finding Welsh musical stars. It ran for one series.

In 2014, Cothi was cast as Mrs Nellie Lovett in the musical Sweeney Todd, alongside Sir Bryn Terfel for the Llangollen International Musical Eisteddfod. She later reprised the role in 2018 when Angelika Kirchschlager fell ill and had to cancel.

Since 2014, Cothi has presented her own Welsh Language morning program Bore Cothi on BBC Radio Cymru. The show usually aired every weekday between 10:00AM and 12:00PM, but was moved an hour later due to the spread of COVID-19. Meaning fewer presenters are required in the studio throughout the course of the day. The new slot has since been made permanent on Radio Cymru.

In 2015, Cothi played the role of Ceridwen in Ar Waith Ar Daith, in celebration of Wales Millennium Centre's 10th Anniversary. It was fronted at the Roald Dahl Plass, Cardiff Bay and also broadcast live on S4C.

On 5 June 2015, to mark BBC Music Day, Cothi set a new world record for the longest-distance duet ever made between two people. Andres Evans from Patagonia sang ‘Calon Lân’, 7,000 miles apart from Cothi who was residing in Cardiff. The attempt was broadcast live on BBC Radio Cymru, BBC Radio Wales and BBC Radio 3 and has been officially certified by Guinness World Records. The attempt took place at BBC Hoddinott Hall in Cardiff. Cothi was joined by the BBC National Orchestra of Wales, the BBC National Chorus of Wales and Côr CF1. In Patagonia, Evans was joined by members of the Gaiman Music School Choir.

Between 23 and 25 October 2015, Cothi was one of twelve headline artists to perform at the Broadway to the Bay show in celebration of its 10th anniversary. Cothi, also dueted with Rhydian Roberts.

On 23 October 2015, Cothi released her second album; Paradwys. It reached number 26 on the Classic FM chart and number 18 in the classical charts.

In 2017, Cothi participated in Cyngerdd y 10 Difa, a Welsh-language singing entertainment show at Venue Cymru, Llandudno. The show saw 10 of Wales' best sopranos and mezzo-sopranos competed for the attention of the host. Cothi has also participated in numerous events held all around Wales, raging from charity events to Welsh variety show Noson Lawen.

In 2018, Cothi was awarded the Welsh Music Guild's Geraint Stanley Jones Award for her contribution to music through broadcast.

On 30 March 2018, Cothi presented an hour long documentary on S4C looking at the work of the active charity Amser Justin Time. The show also included the highlights of the 10th anniversary charity concert held in at Pontrhydfendigaid Pavilion in memory of her late husband. Cothi hosted.

On 4 July 2019, Cothi hosted the annual Womenspire awards at St Fagans National Museum of History in Cardiff. The ceremony showcased the achievements of extraordinary women through a number of categories.

On 8 June 2020, Cothi featured in an episode of Wonders of the Coast Path for ITV Cymru Wales, hosted by Sean Fletcher. It saw both on horseback riding across the Merthyr Mawr Sand Dunes.

On 30 July 2020, Chothi co–presented Gŵyl AmGen on BBC Radio Cymru with Huw Stephens. The online festival was created as a replacement to the National Eisteddfod of Wales after being postponed in 2020 due to the spread of COVID-19.

In January 2021, Cothi participated in Canu gyda fy Arwr, a Welsh-language singing entertainment show on S4C. The show travels all over Wales with the aim to fulfill people's dreams of singing with their musical heroes.

== Personal life ==
Cothi has one older brother.

On 30 August 2007, Cothi married her long-term partner Huw Justin Smith, who was also known as Pepsi Tate. Smith, who had been diagnosed with terminal pancreatic cancer would eventually die 18 days later. They married at the Marie Curie hospice in Penarth (where Smith was residing) with thirteen guests present.

The pair initially travelled to the Memorial Sloan Kettering Cancer Center in New York in the hope of finding a cure for his cancer. Although their attempts were unsuccessful, Smith used the trip as an opportunity to propose to Cothi.

Following this, Cothi decided to raise awareness of pancreatic cancer by setting up a charity called Amser Justin Time, in memory of her late husband. In 2008, Cothi lead a three-week horse ride throughout Wales in order to raise awareness. Starting on Talacre beach, near Prestatyn, six riders travelled 300 miles before finishing at Ogmore Vale, Bridgend. As of 2019, the charity has raised over £250,000 for the European Cancer Stem Cell Research Institute.

Cothi is a keen horsewoman, and an amateur jockey. She owns one horse, called Caio, which she bought soon after Smith's death In 2012 she participated in her own documentary Cheltenham Cothi, which told the progress of her becoming a competitive jockey at the St Patrick's Day Charity Derby in Cheltenham.

In September 2013, Cothi, alongside 52 fundraisers successfully climbed Mount Kilimanjaro in support of Velindre Cancer Centre and her own charity, Amser Justin Time. Celebrities that took part include Martyn Williams, Rhod Gilbert and Iolo Williams.

== Filmography ==
Radio
Year	Title	Role	Slot	Station	Notes
2014–present	Bore Cothi	Presenter	11:00–12:30	BBC Radio Cymru	Previously aired from 10:00–12:00 (2014–2020) and 11:00–13:00 (2020).

== Discography ==
=== Singles ===
Title	English translation	Length	Release	Notes
Geiriau o Wely Pryderon	Words from the Bed of Worries	03'36"	2004	with Gillian Elisa
Credaf	I Believe	05'28"	2008	Charity single with Bryn Terfel and Tigertailz
Nadolig, Pwy a Wŷr?	Christmas, Who Knows?	02'34"	2009	with Huw Rees
Y Drymiwr Bach / Daeth Hedd i’r Byd	The Little Drummer Boy / Peace Came to the World (Joy to the World)	03'00"	2009	with Bethan Gwanas
Anwylyn Mair	Mary's Beloved	03'14"	2009	with Rhys Meirion
Santa’n dod i’r Dre / Santa Cariad	Santa Comes To Town / Santa Baby	03'11"	2009	with Leni Hatcher
Lisa Lân	Fair Lisa	03'43"	2010	with Only Men Aloud
O Sanctaidd Nos	O Holy Night	03'34"	2012	with Tri Tenor Cymru
Anfonaf Angel	I Send an Angel	04'27"	2013	with Côr Canna
Carol y Gannwyll	Candle Carol	04'10"	2013	with Côr Canna
Hen Wlad Fy Nhadau	Land of my Fathers	04'30"	2015	with Rhydian Roberts

=== Albums ===
Title	English translation	Length	Release	Notes
Passione	Passione	55'03"	2005	Debut album; 14 songs
Paradwys	Paradise	45'57"	2015	12 songs
Coflaid yr Angel	Angel's Embrace	11'21"	2018	with Elin Fflur; 2 songs
