= Con Passionate =

Welsh television drama series

- Starring: Shân Cothi; Matthew Gravelle; Ifan Huw Dafydd; William Thomas
- Country of origin: Wales
- No. of series: 3
- No. of episodes: 26

Production
- Running time: 40 minutes

Original release
- Network: S4C
- Release: 2 January 2005 – 30 November 2008

Con Passionate is a Welsh-language television drama series, written by Siwan Jones and directed by Rhys Powys for S4C. The first two series were Teledu Apollo productions.

== Plot ==
The main plot of the series revolves around the consequences of a female singer, Davina Roberts (Shân Cothi), taking the conducting role of the male voice choir, "Côr Meibion Gwili". The ghost of the previous male conductor, Walford, continuously haunts choir member Brian throughout series one and the final episode of series two.

== History ==
The first series began on 2 January 2005 and continued every Sunday night at 9:00 p.m. and was repeated on Tuesday nights with English subtitles, and had an eight-week run. The ratings broke S4C's records for that year and due to its success it was then repeated in the autumn of that year every Saturday night at approx. 9:30 p.m. with English subtitles. The second series began on 2 March 2006 and also ran for eight weeks. This was also a success and the show was given a higher budget which meant they could use CGI, provided by Cardiff-based Dinamo Productions. The second series was repeated on S4C Digidol in the summer of 2007 and ran until the end of July. The first and second series were shown on S4C Digidol in the summer of 2008. Many people compare the series with other S4C dramas and describe it as being "a breath of fresh air in Welsh media". This set the standard for future S4C Welsh dramas such as Cowbois ac Injans. The third and last series of 'Con Passionate' aired between October and December 2008.

== Characters ==
- Alun ap Brinley: Ian
- Toni Caroll: Glesni
- Shân Cothi: Davina
- Ifan Huw Dafydd: Pete
- Matthew Gravelle: Eurof
- Rebecca Harries: Siân Eleri
- Morgan Hopkins: Maldwyn
- Mark Lewis Jones: Irfon
- Sara McGaughey: Louise
- Siwan Morris: Llinos
- Steffan Rhodri: Andy
- Huw Rhys: Craig
- Beth Robert: Judith
- Eiry Thomas: Helen
- William Thomas: Glyn
- Rhianydd Wynne: Eirlys
- Nia Ann Davies: Gwenllian
- Sara Lloyd Gregory: Ellen Wynne
- Sion Ifan: Martin

Davina Roberts is the main character of the drama, and she is the conductor of the male voice choir as well as a soprano from Carmarthenshire. She is dedicated to her role as the conductor and works hard with her music. She is a talented musician and enjoys getting passionate and into the spirit of a piece of music, although sometimes she feels that the boys at Cwmgwili can't keep up with her high standards.

Pete is one of the basses of the choir and has the chance to meet and get to know his long lost son, Simon. Because Pete has been living on his own for years and years, his girl friend, Dwynwen moving in with him at the end of the first series, doesn't always make him happy.

Glyn is a tenor in the choir but also received the role of the "honourable secretary of the choir" (ysgrifennydd anrhydeddus y côr). His wife, Glesni, accuses him of being obsessed with the choir, and with numerous trips on the agenda he has little time for anything else. As a result of this, his wife goes to live with the caretaker, Maldwyn, and Glyn then refuses to talk to her.

Ian is another one of the second tenors in the choir. He has a failing marriage with Helen, and comes to the end of his tether when he discovers that she has been having an affair with Tony, and sends blood mail to Davina accusing Helen. Helen then discovers this and uses it as a weapon in order to black mail him.

Andy, another bass, wants to become a professional singer "like Bryn Terfel", and gets an application form for the Welsh College of Music and Drama. Despite his many efforts to escape his job as a solicitor he fails until the second series when he decides to become an interior designer.

Eurof is also a second tenor, who despite his bardic talents, hasn't always had an easy life. His worst enemy, Siân Eleri, is one of his colleagues in his job as a Welsh teacher. But with Siân Eleri in an asylum getting over her drinking problems, things start to look up for him for a while.

== Reception ==
=== Ratings ===
Series 1
Episode	Airdate	Rating	Rank	Ref(s)
1-01	2 January 2005	64,000	11	
1-02	9 January 2005	74,000	8	
1-03	16 January 2005	67,000	10	
1-04	23 January 2005	75,000	12	
1-05	30 January 2005	69,000	9	
1-06	6 February 2005	70,000	6	
1-07	13 February 2005	82,000	7	
1-08	20 February 2005	77,000	6	
1-09	27 February 2005	56,000	9	
1-10	6 March 2005	72,000	7	

=== Awards ===
- Con Passionate won the award for the best drama at the Celtic Film and Television Festival Awards and the judges were "singing its praise".
- Con Passionate won the prize for best soap/light drama at the 2007 Rose d'Or awards.
- Wendy Richards, one of the editors, won the award for best editor at Bafta Cymru.
- The series has been nominated as Best Drama Series at the 2009 Bafta Cymru awards, including Siwan Jiones as Best Screenwriter, Rhys Powys as Best Director (Film/Drama).

== See also ==
- List of Welsh television series
