= Ffermio =

- Genre: Magazine
- Presented by: Alun Elidyr; Daloni Metcalfe; Meinir Jones; Terwyn Davies
- Country of origin: Wales

Production
- Producers: Telesgop; S4C
- Running time: 30 minutes (including advertisements)

Original release
- Network: S4C
- Release: 1997 – present

Ffermio (English: Farming) is a farming and countryside magazine series, which is broadcast on S4C on Monday nights at 8.25pm.

Ffermio was launched in 1997 and the original series was presented by Sulwyn Thomas, Gerallt Pennant and Rachael Garside, and dealt with the latest farming issues, as well as including the latest livestock market prices throughout Wales.

In 2005 the series was relaunched with a new branding and presenting team. The launch included the usual weekly Ffermio Welsh television programme on S4C, and a twice-weekly farming news and weather bulletin on S4C Digidol. The new presenters included Iola Wyn, Daloni Metcalfe, Alun Elidyr and Mererid Wigley.

The Bwletin Ffermio included details on legislation and market prices for example, which meant that longer items could be featured in the half-hour programmes on subjects of wider appeal such as organic food, transport, health and rural housing, and portraits of rural characters from all ages and backgrounds. Mererid Wigley was the main presenter of this programme, until August 2008. Terwyn Davies joined the team as the Bwletin's presenter in summer 2008 until the series ended in May 2009.

In January 2011, Iola Wyn left her role as presenter after six years at the helm. On 24 January 2011, Meinir Jones made her first appearance as the programme's new presenter.

On 14 January 2011, Rachael Garside made a one-off return to Ffermio in a special programme, Cofio'r Clwy', where she revisited some of the farms and businesses worst hit by the Foot and Mouth epidemic in 2001.

On 28 February 2011, Terwyn Davies made a return to the presenting team, as Daloni Metcalfe took some time off on maternity leave.
