= Dal Ati =

Series of Welsh-language television programmes

Dal Ati (Keep at It) was a series of Welsh language television programmes broadcast on S4C to help Welsh speakers and learners gain confidence in the language. It was launched at the 2014 National Eisteddfod of Wales. The series consisted of two one-hour programmes broadcast on Sunday mornings. The first series began on 28 September 2014.

The Sunday programmes included Bore Da (Good Morning) and Milltir Sgwâr (Square Mile). The former, presented by Elin Llwyd and Alun Williams, covered lifestyle topics—including items from recent episodes of Heno—in easy-to-follow Welsh. The latter took presenter Nia Parry to different locations in Wales to meet people and explore local life.

In 2015, a regular hour-long programme, Galwch Acw, was added to the strand, testing Welsh learners' language and cooking skills.

Dal Ati was replaced in January 2019 by a new Welsh-language service for learners, S4C Dysgu Cymraeg, which broadcast on Sunday afternoons.
