= Y Lle =

- Filming for Y Lle in its original format
- Presented by: Griff Lynch, Leni Hatcher, Hanna Hopwood (retd)
- Countries of origin: Wales, United Kingdom

Original release
- Network: S4C
- Release: 7 January 2011 – present

Y Lle (The Place) is a culture-themed Welsh-language television show which began transmission on S4C in January 2011. During series 1 it aired weekly on Friday nights at 6:30 pm. It subsequently aired on Thursday nights, with the style of the show much changed from its beginnings.

Y Lle Gwisgo crew

The original series of the show had a theme alternating every week. The first programme of the month was called Y Lle, and it tended to focus on music, films and other events. The second programme of the month was called Y Lle Gwisgo, a show about fashion. It has a catwalk which showcases different designers' clothes every month. The third programme of the month was Y Lle Feiral, which takes a look at all things geeky - gadgets, technology and the web - which a gang of hubbers. The final programme was called Y Lle Siarad, where young people can have their say on issues that affect them. It consisted of a panel of experts and a studio audience of young people with plenty to say.

During its 2013 run, the show was a magazine-style weekly, focusing on various cultural and technological subjects and presented from the studio by Griff Lynch and Leni Hatcher. Included in the programme were recordings of gigs, sports competitions, fashion shows and other events. The shows often include a live performance by current Welsh-language artists and feature guides for upcoming films, gigs and festivals. It is screened with optional English subtitles.

2013 also saw the programme expand into an extra half-hour programme of live music entitled Y Lle: Ochr1, presented by Lynch. Its first series included eight weekly shows (broadcast on the Tuesday following the regular Y Lle screening). Among the artists performing on the show were Mr. Huw, Y Bandana, Sŵnami, Hud, Gai Toms, H Hawkline, Sen Segur and Colorama.

Filming for Y Lle Siarad
