= Ffarmers =

Village in Carmarthenshire, Wales

Coordinates: 52.0845°N 3.9723°W

Ffarmers is a village near Lampeter, in the north of Carmarthenshire, Wales. It is believed to have been named after the old "Farmers' Arms" public house, which is now closed. The double "f" in the name comes from the Welsh language spelling of the "f" sound in "farmers". The village stands on the old Roman road, Sarn Helen, which was used by cattle drovers to take their livestock from Wales to Smithfield market in London.

The small rivers Afon Twrch and Afon Fanafas flow to the south of the village and join the River Tywi between Llandeilo and Carmarthen.
