= Daloni Metcalfe =

Welsh television and radio presenter

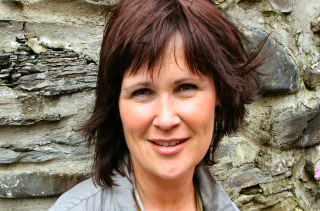
- Born: February 9, 1968 (age 58)
- Education: University of Wales Aberystwyth
- Occupations: Television and radio presenter
- Years active: 1989 – present

Daloni Metcalfe is a Welsh television and radio presenter (born 9 February 1968), currently presenting the Ffermio and Fferm Ffactor series on S4C.

== Early life ==
Daloni's family were farmers breeding cattle and sheep on a small holding in the parish of Llanrhychwyn in the Conwy Valley. In her youth, she was a member of Llanrwst Young Farmers' Club. She graduated from the University of Wales Aberystwyth.

== Broadcasting career ==
Daloni's first job with BBC Wales, in 1989, saw her in Dyffryn Conwy presenting at the National Eisteddfod. She expanded into other areas including presenting for Heno and Wedi 7 and presenting the news for S4C, for whom she also annually presents the Royal Welsh Show. She joined the Ffermio team in January 2005, and began presenting a new series - Fferm Ffactor in 2009.

== Personal life ==
Daloni farms with her husband Wil and their five children in Tudweiliog on the Llŷn Peninsula where they breed sheep and commercial cattle. Daloni herself has recently begun breeding Aberdeen Angus calves.
