= Sgorio Cymru =

- Genre: Sports
- Created by: S4C
- Developed by: Rondo
- Country of origin: United Kingdom (Wales)
- Original language: Welsh (English Subtitles)

Production
- Running time: 30 minutes
- Production company: S4C

Original release
- Network: S4C
- Release: present

Sgorio Cymru is a Welsh-language football television programme on S4C, featuring comprehensive highlights from the Welsh Premier League and the Welsh Cup. The show is broadcast every Monday night throughout the season. Several live matches are broadcast throughout the year.

Morgan Jones and Alun Williams present the weekly highlights show on a rotating basis with main match commentary from Bryn Tomos, reports on other games from Emyr Davies, Mike Davies, Llyr Huws Gruffydd & Gary Pritchard and a regular news round-up from Malcolm Allen.

The show was previously known as Y Clwb Pel Droed until previous producers BBC Cymru lost the rights to Welsh domestic football to S4C. During the season, an interactive service was introduced on digital satellite for English-language commentary, produced by Sunset and Vine Cymru.
