= Tafwyl =

Welsh-language festival in Cardiff, Wales

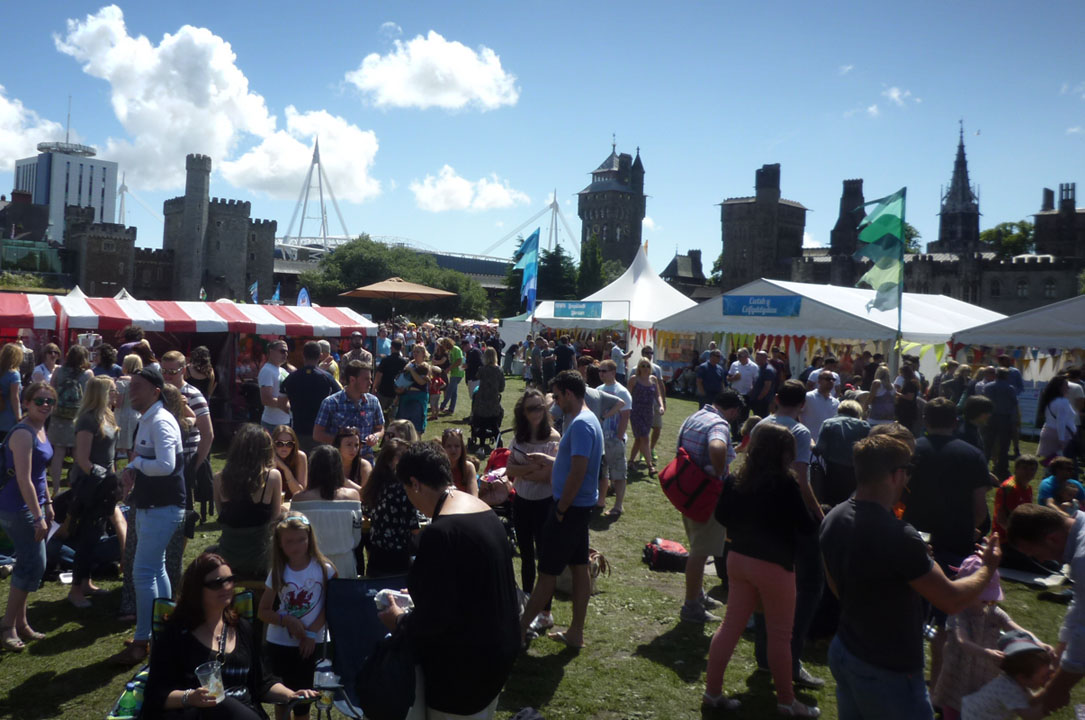
- Tafwyl 2016 in Cardiff Castle
- Status: Active
- Genre: Music and cultural festival
- Frequency: Annually (June or July)
- Locations: Cardiff, Wales
- Years active: 20 years
- Inaugurated: July 2006
- Most recent: 14 June 2025 – 15 June 2025
- Next event: 19 June 2026 – 20 June 2026
- Attendance: 38,000 (2017)
- Organiser: Menter Caerdydd
- Website: tafwyl.cymru

The Tafwyl festival is an annual Welsh-language festival which takes place in Cardiff, Wales. It culminates with a two day open air festival, normally held in Bute Park, and previously held in Cardiff Castle.

== Background ==
The event was set up in 2006 and initially took place on a small scale outside the Mochyn Du pub near the city centre. Since 2012 it has been held at Cardiff Castle or in Bute Park, though in July 2017 it took place in Llandaff Fields in Pontcanna. It forms part of a series of summer festivals entitled Cardiff Festivals.

Tafwyl is now split into two events: Tafwyl Fair, the main event at the weekend, and Tafwyl Week, a 7 day fringe festival the week before. The main weekend event includes bars (selling amongst other things the specially brewed beer 'Cwrw Tafwyl') and street food outlets. The organisers describe Tafwyl Week as featuring "Welsh culture at its very finest".

The main festival is free to enter and in 2017 saw 38,000 visitors with a peak of over 8,000 in the grounds at any one time, compared to Cardiff Castle's maximum capacity of 5,000. In 2014 Tafwyl attracted 18,717 people.

Tafwyl returned to Cardiff Castle, but outgrew the site in 2023 and moved to Bute Park to use Coopers Field and the Sunken Lawn. It returned again to Bute Park in 2024.

Bands and performers appearing at the festival have included Bryn Fôn, Candelas, Elin Fflur, Geraint Jarman, Daniel Lloyd a Mr Pinc, Y Niwl, Meic Stevens, Sŵnami and Yws Gwynedd.
