= Deiniol Jones =

Wales international rugby union player

- Full name: Deiniol Llyr Jones
- Born: 18 November 1977 (age 48) Carmarthen, Wales
- Height: 6 ft 5 in (1.96 m)
- Weight: 18 st 1 lb (115 kg)
- School: Ysgol Gyfun Llandysul
- University: University of Bath

Rugby union career
- Position: Lock
Youth career
- Carmarthen Quins
Senior career
Years	Team	Apps	(Points)
1997–2000	Bath		
2000–2001	Ebbw Vale		
2001–?	Bridgend		
2003–2004	Celtic Warriors		
2004–2011	Cardiff Blues	92	(5)
International career
Years	Team	Apps	(Points)
2000–2010	Wales	13	(0)

Deiniol Jones (born 18 November 1977) is a Welsh former professional rugby union player who played as a lock. Born in Carmarthen, he played for the Carmarthen Quins youth team before moving to study chemistry at the University of Bath in 1997. There, he was picked up by English Premiership side Bath RFC, where he played for three years before a loan move back to Wales with Ebbw Vale. In 2001, he made a permanent move to Bridgend, and two years later he was signed by the newly formed, Bridgend-based regional side Celtic Warriors. The Warriors only lasted one year before folding, after which Jones moved to Cardiff Blues.

Jones became the first player to make 100 appearances for the Blues in a match against Connacht in May 2008. He played for the Blues for eight years before his retirement from playing due to a shoulder injury in April 2012, making his last appearance in another game against Connacht in October 2011.

Jones made one appearance for the Barbarians in January 2009, in the official opening match for the Scarlets' new stadium, Parc y Scarlets. The Scarlets won the match 40–24.

Jones made his Wales debut on 11 November 2000 against Samoa.

In July 2012, Jones was appointed the match-day team manager of Cardiff Blues.

Jones is a fluent Welsh speaker.
