= Bryn Fôn =

Welsh actor and singer-songwriter

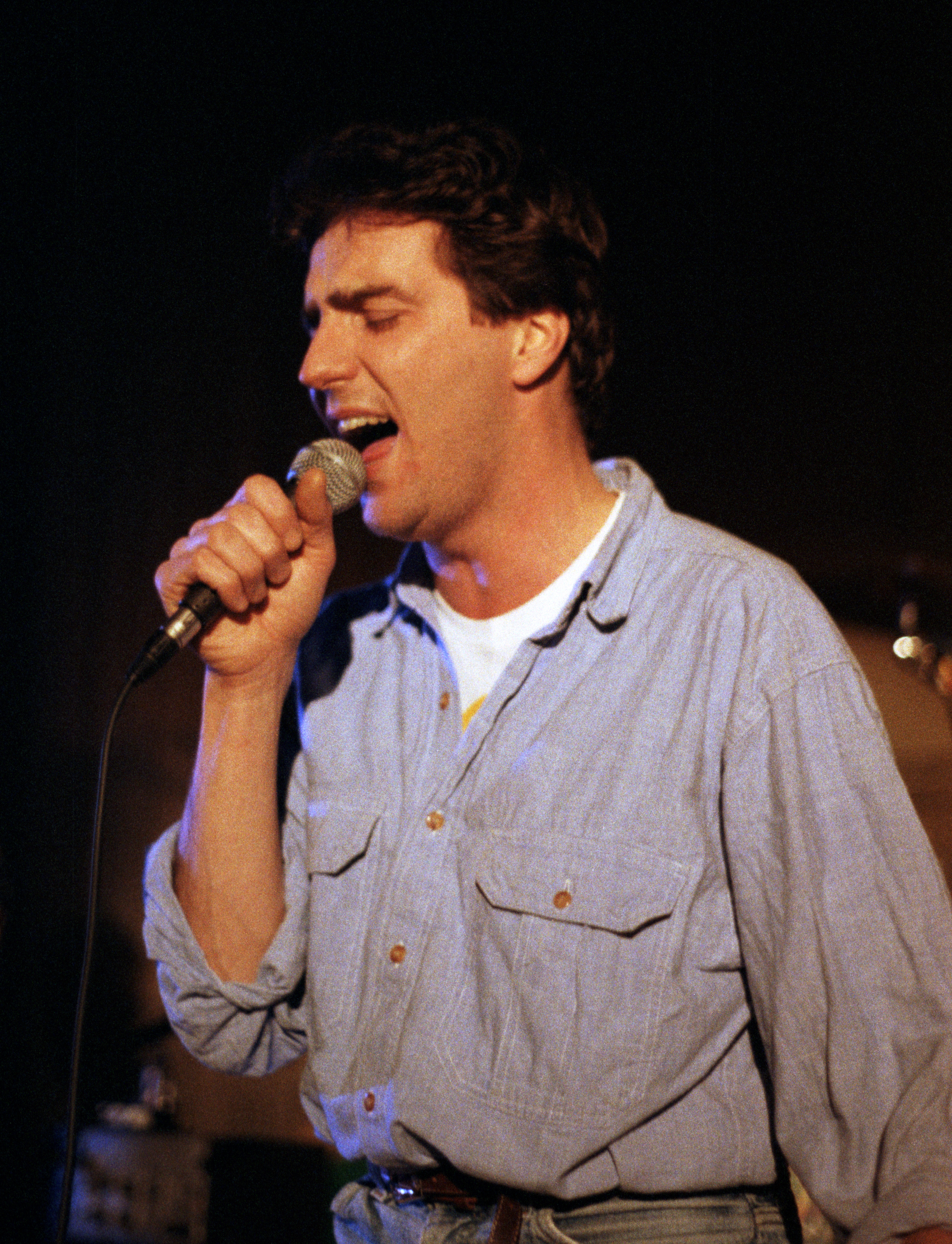
- Fôn in September 2010
- Born: 27 August 1954 (age 72); Llanllyfni, Caernarfonshire, Wales
- Education: Ysgol Gynradd Llanllyfni; Ysgol Uwchradd Dyffryn Nantlle
- Occupations: Singer; actor; television presenter
- Years active: 1977–present
- Employer: S4C
- Spouse: Anna Wynne-Williams (m. 2004; died 2025)
- Children: 2

Bryn Fôn (born 27 August 1954) is a Welsh actor and singer-songwriter. He also became the first artist to play live on BBC Radio Cymru in 1977.

== Biography ==
Bryn Fôn was born in Llanllyfni, Caernarfonshire. He attended Ysgol Gynradd Llanllyfni and Ysgol Dyffryn Nantlle before going on to study physical exercise and environmental studies at college. He began his career in entertainment by taking part in the opera Dic Penderyn in 1977. He formed the musical group Crysbas after leaving college, and Sobin a'r Smaeliaid in 1988. He was voted the hunk of the month in She magazine during the 1980s.

He began releasing albums with his band under his own name in 1994. He and his band later performed under the name Bryn Fôn a'r Band, releasing music under their own label laBelaBel. He won the song contest Cân i Gymru in 1997, with Un Funud Fach.

In his later career, Fôn has concentrated on appearing on stage and also adapted the play Blackbird for a production by Theatr Bara Caws in which he starred in 2010. At present, he performs with his own band. He is involved with numerous gigs yearly all over Wales, most particularly the Royal Welsh Show and the National Eisteddfod of Wales.

== Personal life ==
A campaign of arson attacks linked to the Welsh language movement began in December 1979, which involved burning down English-owned holiday homes in Wales. Fôn wrote a song belittling the police's unsuccessful attempts to catch those responsible. In 1990, several detectives visited his home and he was arrested along with his partner, Anna, after they discovered a package hidden in a wall on his cottage's land. He was held at the police station in Dolgellau for 48 hours before being released without charge. His C'mon Midffild! co-cast member, Mei Jones, was arrested at the same time.

In January 2011, it was announced that Bryn Fôn was one of a hundred people who had refused to pay their TV licences as part of the Cymdeithas yr Iaith Gymraeg protests against plans to cut the budget of the Welsh-language TV channel, S4C, and the plans to transfer control over the channel to the BBC.

Fôn is also politically active in support of the Welsh language, and is a supporter of Welsh independence.

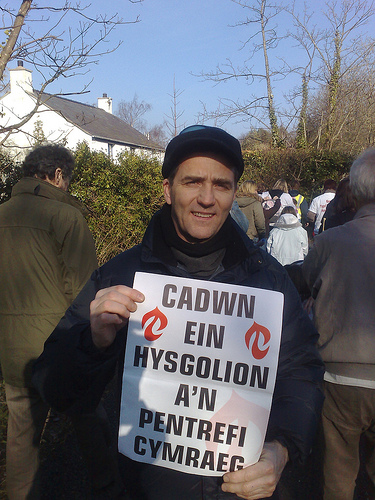
Bryn Fôn at a Cymdeithas yr Iaith Gymraeg protest. Poster reads: "Keep our Welsh-language schools and villages".

Fôn is married with two children.

== Discography ==
=== Albums ===
Band	Title	Year	Record label			
Crysbas	Draenog Marw / Y Nhw (Wil Bach)	1978	Sain			
Crysbas	Ond ... Mae 'Di Bwrw	1979	Sain			
Sobin a'r Smaeliaid	Ta-ta Botha	1989	Sain			
Sobin a'r Smaeliaid	Sobin a'r Smaeliaid – 1	1990	Sain			
Sobin a'r Smaeliaid	Sobin a'r Smaeliaid – 1	1990	Sain	Caib	1991	Sain
Sobin a'r Smaeliaid	A Rhaw	1992	Sain			
Bryn Fôn	Dyddiau Di-gymar	1994	Crai			
Bryn Fôn	Dawnsio ar y Dibyn	1998	Crai			
Bryn Fôn	Caneuon Tecwyn y Tractor	2004	Sain			
Bryn Fôn a’r Band	Abacus	2004	laBelaBel			
Sobin a'r Smaeliaid	Goreuon Sobin	2005	Sain			
Bryn Fôn a’r Band	CAM	2005	laBelaBel			
Bryn Fôn a’r Band	Toca	2008	laBelaBel			
Bryn Fôn a’r Band	Y Goreuon 1994–2005	2009	Sain			
Bryn Fôn a’r Band	Ynys	2014	laBelaBel			

== Filmography ==
Year	Show	Role	Note
1979	The Corn Is Green	Robbart	
1982	Y Gosb		
1986	Siwan	William de Braose	Aired on 27 December 1986
1988	Lliwiau	Rheinallt Vaughan	
1988–1994, 2004	C'mon Midffîld!	Tecwyn Parri	
1989	Jabas	Mr Morrison	Series 2
1990	Cân i Gymru	Contestant	Winner
1990	Mwy Na Phapur Newydd		
1990	O.M	Owen Morgan Edwards	
1991	Outside Time	Manawydan	
1991	Traed Mewn Cyffion	Ifan Gruffydd	
1994	Dwylo		
1994–1997	Pengelli	Gwyn Lloyd	Series 1–4
1997	Cân i Gymru	Contestant	Winner
1999–2005	Talcen Caled	Les Hughes	5 series; 34 episodes
2000	Meibion Glandŵr		
2001	Y Stafell Ddirgel	Huw Morris	
2001–2002	A Mind to Kill	DC Meic Challis	Series 3–4; also starred in the Welsh version Yr Heliwr.
2002	Eldra	William	
2007–2008	Tipyn o Stad	Ed Lovell	Series regular; series 6–7
2008–2010	Ista'nbwl		
2013–2015	Gwaith/Cartref	Brynmor Davies	Series 3–5
2016–2017	Anita	Bedwyr	2 series
2017–2018	Pobol y Cwm	Dr Elgan Pritchard	Series regular
2018	Bryn Fôn a PTSD	Presenter	
2019	Hidden	Hefin Mathews	Series 2; also starred in the Welsh version Craith.
2021	Bryn Fôn: Chwilio am Feibion Glyndŵr	Presenter	One-off special
2022	Stad	Ed Lovell	Spin off to Tipyn o Stad
