= Alys Williams (singer) =

Alys Mair Williams
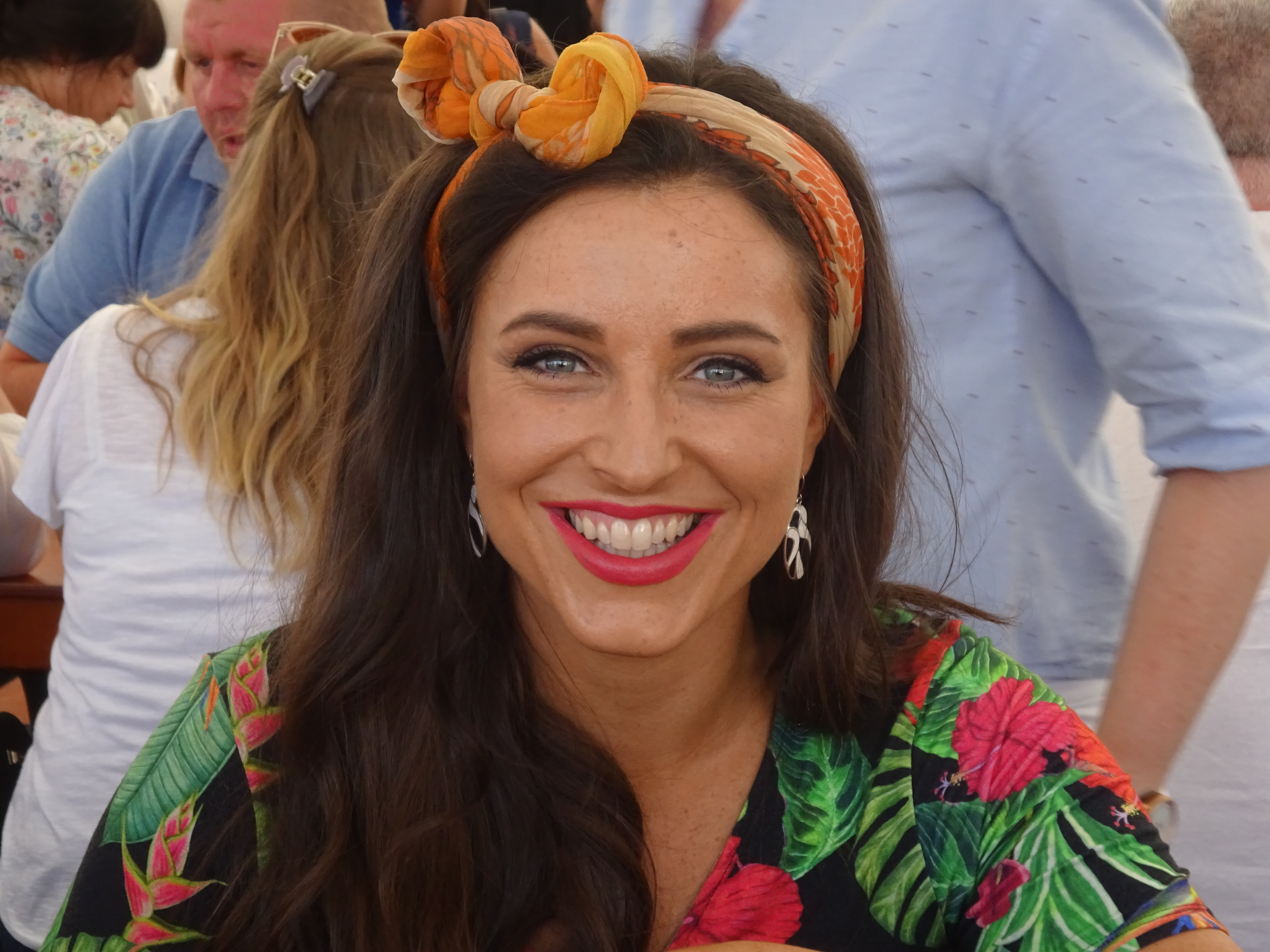

Background information
- Born: 1987 (age 38–39); St Asaph, Denbighshire, Wales

Alys Mair Williams (born 1987) is a Welsh singer. She sings pop songs with folk and jazz influences and includes improvised riffs while singing.

Williams grew up in Caernarfon where she attended Ysgol Syr Hugh Owen. Williams studied A levels at Coleg Menai, Bangor and went on to study Alternative Therapies in Liverpool .

== Television appearances ==
Williams appeared on the first series of The Voice UK in April 2012 but didn't get through the 'blind auditions'. She returned the following year to prove that she could do better. That year, all four judges picked Williams and she then chose the singer Tom Jones as her mentor. Williams reached the quarter final of the competition in June 2013.

In October 2017 Williams featured in an episode of the S4C series, Deuawdau Rhys Meirion, where she took Rhys Meirion to a number of locations that were important to her and performed a number of duets with him.

She was a guest coach supporting Ywain Gwynedd and Team Yws for the semi-finals of the singing competition, Y Llais, in March 2025.

== Personal life ==
Williams is the mother of twins, Catrin and Gruffudd, who were only 3-years old when she appeared on The Voice. She lives in Llanrug, Gwynedd.

Williams is a qualified personal trainer, after having found weight-lifting helped improved her confidence.
