= Sŵnami =

Welsh indie rock band

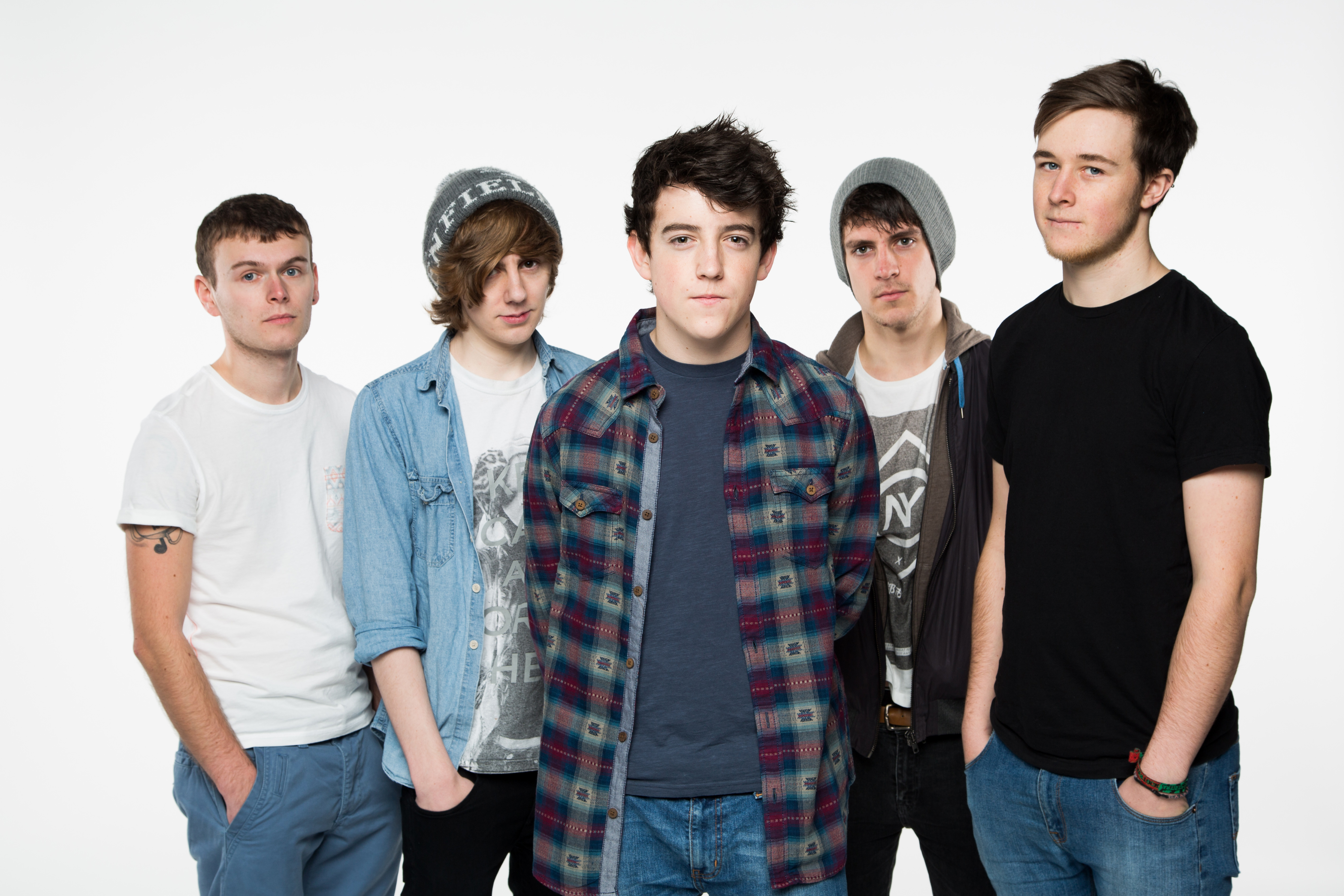
- Sŵnami in 2012

Background information
- Origin: Dolgellau, Gwynedd, Wales
- Genres: Indie Rock
- Years active: 2011–present
- Labels: Rasal (2012–14); I Ka Ching (2014–2021); CÔSH (2021–present)
- Members: Ifan Davies; Ifan Ywain; Gruff Jones; Gerwyn Murray; Lewis Williams
- Past members: Huw Ynyr; Tom Ayres

Sŵnami (Welsh pronunciation: [suːˈnaːmi]) are a Welsh indie rock group from Dolgellau, North Wales, who sing predominantly in Welsh. They won the Welsh Language Album of the Year prize at the 2016 National Eisteddfod of Wales. Their name is a play on the word "tsunami" and the Welsh word for sound, "sŵn", to convey the idea of a wave of sound.

== Career ==
Sŵnami was formed around the beginning of 2011. The band's lead singer is Bangor University graduate, Ifan Davies, who is from outside Llanegryn, Gwynedd. The other members of the band are Ifan Ywain (guitar), Gerwyn Murray (bass), Lewis Williams (drums), Gruff Jones (synth). They describe their style as "rocky with a bit of synth".

The band won the Brwydr Y Bandiau (Battle of the Bands) at the 2011 National Eisteddfod in Wrexham. In 2012 they beat nine other bands to win Wakestock Battle of the Bands and secure a place on the line up of that year's Wakestock festival.

In 2015 Sŵnami won awards for Best EP or Single (for their single "Cynnydd" / "Gwenwyn") and Best Video (for "Gwenwyn") at the Welsh Y Selar music awards.

The band's first album, Sŵnami, was nominated for the Welsh Music Prize in 2016 and was the winner of Welsh-Language Album of the Year at the 2016 National Eisteddfod held in Abergavenny.

Ifan Davies (lead singer) also plays guitar for Yws Gwynedd and Yr Eira, and Lewis Williams plays the drums for Candelas.

== Discography ==
=== Singles ===
Release	Title	English translation	Label
2012	"Mynd a Dod"	Come and go	Rasal Miwsig
2012	"Eira"	Snow	Rasal Miwsig
2014	"Gwenwyn"	Poison	Recordiau I Ka Ching
2014	"Cynnydd"	Growth/Progress	Recordiau I Ka Ching
2017	"Dihoeni"	Pining	Recordiau Tp
2021	"Theatr"	Theatre	Recordiau Côsh
2021	"Uno, Cydio, Tanio"	Unite, Embrace, Ignite	Recordiau Côsh
2022	"Be Bynnag Fydd"	Whatever Will Be	Recordiau Côsh
2022	"Paradis Disparu"	Lost Paradise	Recordiau Côsh
2022	"Wyt Ti'n Clywed?"	Do you Hear?	Recordiau Côsh

=== EPs and albums ===
Release	Title	English translation	Type	Label
2013	Du a Gwyn	Black and White	EP	Rasal Miwsig
2015	Sŵnami	Tsunami	Album	Recordiau I Ka Ching
2022	Sŵnamii	Tsunami	Album	Recordiau Côsh

== Compilation Albums ==
Year	Title	English Translation	Sŵnami Songs
2015	#40Mawr	#Big40	"Gwreiddiau" at #24 "Gwenwyn" at #35
2016	#40Mawr	#Big40	"Gwenwyn" at #39 "Trwmgwsg" at #23
2017	#40Mawr	#Big40	"Gwreiddiau" at #32 "Trwmgwsg" at #27
