= BBC Radio Cymru =

Welsh national radio station

- Logo used since 2022
- Cardiff, Aberystwyth and Bangor; Wales
- Frequencies: DAB: 12D MuxCo (Mid & West Wales); DAB: 10D MuxCo (North Wales); DAB: 12D Now Digital (SE Wales); DAB: 12A Bauer (Swansea & SW Wales); DAB: 10D MuxCo (Wrexham, Chester & Liverpool); FM: 92.4–96.8 MHz and 103.5–104.9 MHz; Freesat: 715 (all of UK); Freeview: 712; Sky: 0129; Sky: 0130 (rest of UK); Virgin Media: 936(all of UK)

Programming
- Language: Welsh
- Format: News, music, sport, entertainment

Ownership
- Owner: BBC
- Operator: BBC Cymru Wales
- Sister stations: BBC Radio Cymru 2; BBC Radio Wales

History
- First air date: 3 January 1977

Technical information
- Licensing authority: Ofcom

Links
- Webcast: BBC Sounds
- Website: Official website

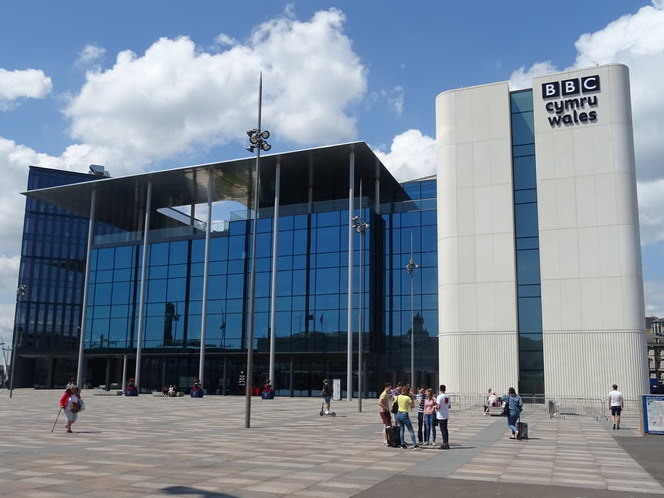
BBC Cymru Wales New Broadcasting House

BBC Radio Cymru (pronounced [ˈkəmrɨ]) is a Welsh language radio station owned and operated by BBC Cymru Wales, a division of the BBC. It broadcasts across Wales on FM, DAB, digital TV and BBC Sounds.

The station broadcasts general factual and entertainment programming for 18 1/2 hours a day from 5:30 am to midnight with overnight programming simulcast from the BBC World Service after closedown.

Its sister station, BBC Radio Cymru 2, providing separate music-led programming at certain hours of the day, broadcasts on digital and online platforms.

The managing editor of BBC Radio Cymru is Dafydd Meredydd, a former presenter and producer.

== Overview ==
BBC Radio Cymru began broadcasting on 3 January 1977. The first programme was an extended news bulletin presented at 6:45 by Gwyn Llewellyn and Geraint Jones. This was followed at 7:00 by the first edition of the breakfast magazine show Helo Bobol!, presented by Hywel Gwynfryn with contributions from a network of local reporters in studios across Wales. The first record played on Radio Cymru was Plas-y-Bryniau by Hergest.

The station was the first broadcasting outlet dedicated wholly to programmes in Welsh, allowing much more airtime than had previously been available on the old Radio 4 Wales (or its predecessors the Welsh Home Service and, before that, the BBC Welsh Regional Programme).

Initially, the service was part-time and restricted to breakfast shows, extended news bulletins at breakfast, lunchtime & early evening and a number of off-peak opt-outs from a sustaining Radio 4 Wales feed.

In November 1979, Radio Cymru's programming was expanded to 65 hours a week, introducing mid-morning output on weekdays, along with a growing line-up of dramas, light entertainment and documentaries. The network continued to expand over the next two decades before achieving a continuous service of up to 20 hours a day.

Later developments in the 21st century saw Radio Cymru introducing a nightly youth strand, C2, and regional opt-outs for South West Wales, which were axed in 2008, but later reintroduced to provide live commentary of Swansea City A.F.C. matches. The station has also been streaming online since January 2005.

Radio Cymru is similar in format to many "general" radio stations, with news programmes at breakfast (Dros Frecwast, 'Over Breakfast'), lunchtime (Dros Ginio, 'Over Lunch'), and drive-time (Post Prynhawn, 'Afternoon Post'); together with presenter-driven sequences mixing music with guests, calls from listeners and competitions. Radio Cymru also produces drama, features, current affairs and sports programming.

Over the years, it has done much to promote the language, with its sports commentators coining new terms which later became accepted by Welsh linguists. One of its more unusual – and longest-running – programmes is Y Talwrn, a poetry competition in which teams must come up with poetry in specific styles on specific topics.

In 2018, following a three-month pilot service, a second station—BBC Radio Cymru 2—was launched on a permanent basis. Initially providing a music and entertainment alternative to the breakfast news programme, the station gradually expanded its own programming while continuing to simulcast output from the main Radio Cymru service. In March 2024, the station expanded its bespoke output from 15 to 60 hours a week, after receiving approval from the broadcast regulator Ofcom to become a fully-fledged public service radio station.

In September 2026, it was announced Radio Cymru would axe its lunchtime news programme Dros Ginio along with the Saturday edition of the breakfast news programme Dros Frecwast and the Saturday morning football magazine show Ar y Marc as part of budget cuts at the BBC.

== Listening figures ==
According to RAJAR, the station has a weekly audience of 120,000 listeners and a listening share of 2.2%, as of March 2026. The average number of hours per listener is 9.6 hours a week.

== Presenters ==
Notable current presenters include:

- Shân Cothi (Bore Cothi)
- Georgia Ruth (Tuesday evenings)
- Caryl Parry Jones (Monday-Thursday nights)
- Huw Stephens (Saturday mornings)

== Transmission ==
BBC Radio Cymru is broadcast across Wales FM and DAB. It is also available on Freeview in Wales, throughout the UK on Freesat, Sky, Virgin Media and internationally online on BBC Sounds. As Radio Cymru was created from an opt-out of BBC Radio 4, it inherited the FM transmitters previously used by Radio 4 across Wales. At the time of the station's launch, it was the only radio service in the UK broadcasting solely on FM.

=== Main transmitters ===
- Blaenplwyf: 93.1
- Haverfordwest: 93.7
- Llanddona: 94.2
- Llangollen: 104.3
- Wenvoe: 96.8

=== Relays ===
- Aberdare: 93.6
- Abergavenny: 103.5
- Abertillery: 104.3
- Betws-y-Coed: 92.6
- Blaenavon: 104.1
- Brecon: 93.3
- Carmarthen: 93.3
- Carmel: 104.6
- Clyro: 92.4
- Conwy: 93.5
- Croeserw: 93.4
- Cwmavon: 104.5
- Deiniolen: 92.5
- Dolgellau: 94.5
- Ebbw Vale: 104.6
- Ferndale: 104.9
- Ffestiniog: 92.5
- Holywell: 104.7
- Kilvey Hill: 104.2
- Llandrindod Wells: 93.5
- Llandecwyn: 93.8
- Llandinam: 96.1
- Llandyfriog: 94.5
- Llanfyllin: 95.7
- Llangeinor: 104.6
- Llanidloes: 92.5
- Llanrhaeadr-ym-Mochnant: 103.8
- Llwyn-Onn: 92.7
- Llyswen: 94.0
- Long Mountain: 103.6
- Machynlleth: 93.8
- Mynydd Pencarreg: 94.1
- Ogmore Vale: 95.0
- Penmaen Rhos: 92.8
- Pennar: 94.7
- Pontypool: 93.6
- Porth: 104.5
- Rheola: 92.6
- Rhymney: 104.9
- Ton Pentre: 93.2
- Varteg Hill: 93.3

== See also ==
- List of Celtic-language media
