= Evan Davies =

Evan Davies or Davis may refer to:

== British ==
- Evan Davies (missionary) (1805–1864), Welsh Protestant Christian missionary
- Evan Tom Davies (1904–1973), Welsh mathematician
- Mervyn Davies, Baron Davies of Abersoch (born 1952), Chairman of Standard Chartered
- Evan Davies (rugby), rugby union and rugby league footballer of the 1910s and 1920s
- Evan Davies (Ebbw Vale MP) (1875–1960), Welsh Member of Parliament for Ebbw Vale, 1920–1929
- Ianto Davies (1892–1946), Wales international rugby union player
- Evan Davis (born 1962), British economist, journalist and presenter for the BBC
- Evan Davies (educationalist) (1826–1872), Welsh educationalist
- Evan Davies (Calvinistic Methodist minister) (1842–1919), Welsh Calvinistic Methodist minister, and writer
- Evan Davies (Independent minister) (1750–1806), Welsh Independent minister
- Evan Davies (almanac-maker) (fl. 1720–1750), Welsh philomath and almanac-maker
- Evan Thomas Davies (musician) (1847–1927), Welsh musician
- Evan Thomas Davies (cleric) (1847–1927), Welsh priest
- Evan Davies (Myfyr Morganwg) (1801–1888), Welsh bard, druid and antiquarian

== American ==
- Evan G. Davies (1877–1967), American politician
- Evan A. Davis (born c. 1944), New York City attorney
- Evan "Funk" Davies (born 1960), American musician and DJ
- Evan Davies, cinematographer and film producer

== Australian ==
- Evan Davies (New South Wales politician) (1889–1948), Australian politician born in Wales
- Evan Davies (Western Australian politician) (1892–1963), Australian politician

== See also ==
- Evan Thomas Davies (disambiguation)
