= Ffransis =

Ffransis is a Welsh given name and surname. Notable people with the name include:

- Ffransis G. Payne (1911–1992), Welsh folklorist, museum curator and author
- Ffred Ffransis (born 1948), Welsh activist and linguist
- Gwenno Teifi Ffransis (born 1987), Welsh language activist
- Meinir Ffransis (born 1950), Welsh political activist
