= Evan Thomas Davies =

Evan Thomas Davies may refer to:

- Evan Tom Davies (1904–1973), Welsh mathematician and linguist
- Evan Thomas Davies (musician) (1847–1927), Welsh musician
- Evan Thomas Davies (cleric) (1847–1927), Welsh priest

== See also ==
- Evan Davies (disambiguation)
