= Gareth Miles =

Welsh author, playwright and language campaigner (1938–2023)

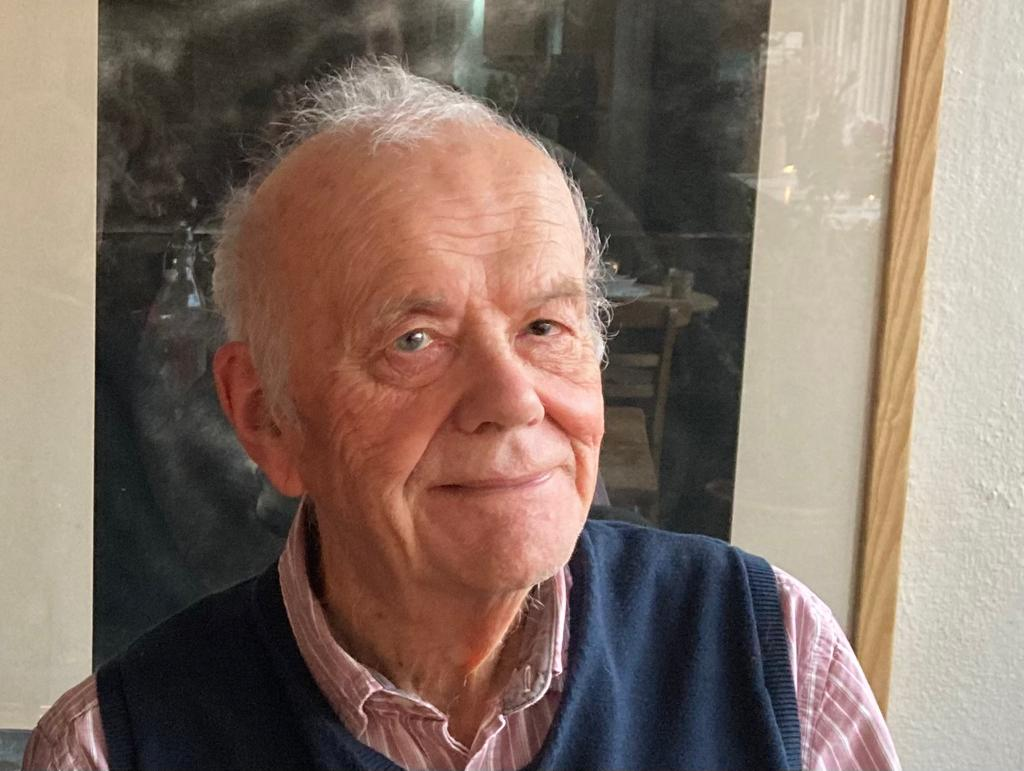
- Born: 19 April 1938; Caernarfon, Gwynedd, Wales
- Died: 6 September 2023 (aged 85); Pontypridd, Rhondda Cynon Taf, Wales
- Education: Bangor University
- Occupations: Author, playwright, teacher, political activist
- Spouse: Gina
- Children: 3 (Elen, Branwen, Eiry)
- Writing career
- Language: Welsh
- Genres: Drama, novels, short stories
- Notable work: Y Proffwyd a'i Ddwy Jesebel
- Notable awards: Wales Book of the Year (2008)

Gareth Miles (19 April 1938 – 6 September 2023) was a Welsh-language author, playwright, teacher and political activist. He was a founder and former chairman of Cymdeithas yr Iaith Gymraeg (the Welsh Language Society) and played a pivotal role in the Welsh language rights movement. A Marxist, he was also chairman of the Communist Party in Wales. Journalist Martin Shipton described him as "one of the most influential figures in the 20th century Welsh language movement."

== Early life and education ==
Miles was born in Caernarfon on 19 April 1938 and was brought up in the nearby village of Waunfawr. His father was from Pontrhydyfen, a village that had a significant influence on Miles throughout his life. He had two sisters, Lisabeth and Gill.

Miles attended Bangor University before becoming a teacher of French and English at schools in Amlwch, Dyffryn Nantlle, and Ysgol Morgan Llwyd, Wrexham. He later became a headteacher at Ysgol Dyffryn Nantlle. He eventually settled in Pontypridd with his family.

== Welsh language activism ==
=== Court summons protest ===
Miles gained early prominence in May 1962 when he became the first person to be fined for demanding equal status for the Welsh language. Money was taken from his pocket whilst in custody to pay a £1 fine that he had no intention of paying, which had been imposed for giving a fellow student a lift on the crossbar of his bicycle some six months earlier. This act of civil disobedience was symbolic, as many Welsh nationalists viewed English-only court summonses as a symbol of English state authority and the subordinate status of Welsh within that system.

=== Founding of Cymdeithas yr Iaith ===
In the August 1962 issue of Welsh Nation, Miles encouraged readers (in English) to follow his example and attend a meeting of a new language movement in Pontarddulais that August - the first meeting of what would become Cymdeithas yr Iaith Gymraeg. The organisation was founded on 4 August 1962 following a radio lecture by Saunders Lewis titled "Tynged yr Iaith" (The Fate of the Language).

Miles served as chairman of Cymdeithas yr Iaith between 1967 and 1968. In reflecting on his leadership, he took pride in preserving the unity of the movement and defending the policy of non-violence. He was instrumental in the sign-painting campaign that involved defacing English-only signage, defending it by saying: "Certainly, we had fun with it. Every time we see a Welsh sign, Cymdeithas can congratulate itself."

== Professional career ==
After his teaching career, Miles became the national organiser of Undeb Cenedlaethol Athrawon Cymru (UCAC), the Welsh teachers' union. Ioan Rhys Jones, UCAC's current General Secretary, described him as "an exceptionally effective national organiser" who had "a thorough knowledge and understanding of Wales" during the early days of discussions on devolving education.

Miles was also Chairman, Secretary and Writer and Editor of Tafod y Ddraig (The Dragon's Tongue) over the years.

== Literary career ==
Miles began working as a professional author in 1982. He wrote over twenty original plays and adaptations that were staged, and also worked as a scriptwriter for television programmes including the drama series Pobol y Cwm, Coleg, and Dinas.

In 2008, his novel Y Proffwyd a'i Ddwy Jesebel (The Prophet and His Two Jezebels) won the Wales Book of the Year award for Welsh-language fiction.

As a translator, Miles was notable for translating Shakespeare's Hamlet into Welsh from a Marxist perspective. He was a strong advocate for the primacy of the dramatist in theatre over devised work.

== Political involvement ==
Miles was a lifelong Marxist and was chairman of the Communist Party in Wales. In a 2003 interview with the BBC, he declared that Karl Marx was the person he admired most "because he more than anyone enabled us to understand the modern world and its complexities, and previous eras as well".

He introduced and embedded the idea within Cymdeithas yr Iaith that the struggle for the Welsh language was integral to social justice and part of the global struggle against imperialist and capitalist power - a philosophy that remains central to the organisation's vision. Robat Idris, current chairman of Cymdeithas yr Iaith, noted that this approach was "an integral part of our vision to this day".

Miles was also active in international solidarity movements, serving as a leader of the Wales Anti-Apartheid Movement.

== Personal life ==
Miles was married to Gina, and the couple had three daughters: Elen, Branwen, and Eiry. The family lived in Pontypridd for many decades after Miles moved there from Waunfawr.

== Death and legacy ==
Miles died at home with his family on 6 September 2023, aged 85. His funeral was held on Friday, 22 September 2023, with a public service at Glyntaff Crematorium, Pontypridd, at 12:45, followed by a reception at Y Bont Club, Pontypridd.

Rob Griffiths, former General Secretary of the Communist Party of Britain and one of Miles's closest friends, said: "Gareth Miles made an enormous contribution to cultural and political life in Wales and internationally as a founder member of Cymdeithas yr Iaith Gymraeg, and as a novelist, playwright and political activist."

Ffred Ffransis, a lifelong language campaigner, said: "Gareth chaired Cymdeithas yr Iaith in an invaluable way by speaking and encouraging new young members. Above all, he gave us all the assurance that the fight for the Welsh language is part of a wider global fight for social justice."

== Selected works ==
=== Novels and short stories ===
- Cymru ar wasgar: chwe stori (1974)
- Trefin (1979)
- Trefaelog (1989)
- Romeo a Straeon Eraill (1999)
- Cwmtec (2002)
- Ffatri Serch (2003)
- Lleidr Da (2005)
- Y Proffwyd a'i Ddwy Jesebel (2007) – Wales Book of the Year winner
- Teleduwiol (2010)
- Cuddwas (2015)

=== Plays and adaptations ===
- Diwedd y Saithdegau (1982)
- Unwaith Eto'n 'Nghymru Annwyl (1983)
- Ffatri Serch (1984)
- Lleidr Da (1986)
- Duges Amalfi (1987)
- Chwiorydd (1987)
- Mandragora (1989)
- Hunllef yng Nghymru Fydd (1990)
- Serch yw'r Teyrn (1991)
- Y Bacchai (1991)
- Y Gosb Ddiddial (1992)
- Coch, Du ac Anwybodus (1993)
- Dyrnod Branwen (1993)
- Calon Ci (1994)
- Llafur Cariad (2001)
