= 1750 in Wales =

- Centuries: 16th; 17th; 18th; 19th; 20th
- Decades: 1730s; 1740s; 1750s; 1760s; 1770s
- See also: List of years in Wales; Timeline of Welsh history 1750 in Great Britain Scotland Elsewhere

Events from the year 1750 in Wales.

== Incumbents ==
- Lord Lieutenant of North Wales (Lord Lieutenant of Anglesey, Caernarvonshire, Flintshire, Merionethshire, Montgomeryshire) – George Cholmondeley, 3rd Earl of Cholmondeley
- Lord Lieutenant of Glamorgan – Charles Powlett, 3rd Duke of Bolton
- Lord Lieutenant of Brecknockshire and Lord Lieutenant of Monmouthshire – Thomas Morgan
- Lord Lieutenant of Cardiganshire – Wilmot Vaughan, 3rd Viscount Lisburne
- Lord Lieutenant of Carmarthenshire – vacant until 1755
- Lord Lieutenant of Denbighshire – Richard Myddelton
- Lord Lieutenant of Pembrokeshire – Sir Arthur Owen, 3rd Baronet
- Lord Lieutenant of Radnorshire – William Perry
- Bishop of Bangor – Zachary Pearce
- Bishop of Llandaff – Edward Cresset
- Bishop of St Asaph – Robert Hay Drummond
- Bishop of St Davids – The Hon. Richard Trevor

== Events ==
- 9 January – At the age of 25, Henry Herbert the younger succeeds to his father's earldom of Pembroke.
- "Disruption of 1750": Howell Harris and Daniel Rowland quarrel, resulting in a lasting split in the Welsh Methodist movement.
- William Thomas begins his diary.

== Arts and literature ==
=== New books ===
==== English language ====
- Griffith Hughes - Natural History of Barbados

==== Welsh language ====
- David Jones - Egluryn Rhyfedd
- Daniel Rowland - Ymddiddan rhwng Methodist Uniawngred ac un Cyfeiliornus

== Births ==
- June - William Morgan, actuary (died 1833)
- 14 November - Edward Williams, clergyman and academic (died 1813)
- 11 December - Isaac Shelby, Welsh-descended American politician (born in US; died 1826)
- unknown date - Evan Davies, Independent minister (died 1806)

== Deaths ==
- 9 January - Henry Herbert, 9th Earl of Pembroke, 56
- May - Sir Samuel Pennant, Lord Mayor of London
- 22 May - Matthew Pritchard, Roman Catholic bishop, 81
- 29 November - Bussy Mansel, 4th Baron Mansel
