= Meinir =

Meinir may refer to:

== People ==
- Meinir Ffransis (born 1950), Welsh language activist
- Meinir Gwilym (born 1983), Welsh pop and folk singer

== Places ==
- Meinir, Anglesey, Wales
