= Comunn Gàidhlig Thoronto =

The Comunn Gàidhlig Thoronto (Toronto Gaelic Society) began to meet in 1880 and was formally established in 1887. Its primary purpose was to give assistance to immigrants from the Gàidhealtachd, but it also aimed to preserve the Scottish Gaelic language and culture. Through the years, as the country itself established a social safety net and more benefits, the society took on a cultural role, preserving Gaelic traditions such as cèilidhs. As its membership aged, the club began to wane and finally ended at the end of the 1980s. It was revived in 2012, however, by young learners interested in the language.
