= Atgof o'r Sêr =

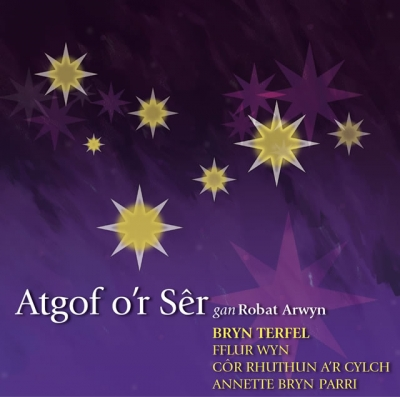
Atgof o'r Sêr album cover

Atgof o'r Sêr (Memory of the Stars) is a musical composition by Welsh contemporary composer Robat Arwyn. It was commissioned for the 2001 National Eisteddfod of Wales in Denbighshire and was written specifically for baritone singer Bryn Terfel, soprano Fflur Wyn, and the Ruthun and District Choir.

Following the live performance at the National Eisteddfod, a book of the music score was published by Curiad, and the recording was released as an album by Sain in 2002. Atgof o'r Sêr comprises eight movements that set Welsh-language poems about stars to music. The title song was written by poet Robin Llwyd ab Owain, translated into Welsh from English. Allmusic gave the recording three out of five stars, noting that Bryn Terfel dominates the album, and giving Fflur Wyn's soprano as a highlight.

Due to its success, a second musical based on the life of Llywelyn ap Gruffudd, Prince of Wales, was performed in August 2005: 'Er Hwylio'r Haul' ("Although the Sun has Set"); it was written by Robat Arwyn. The soloists were Bryn Terfel and soprano Fflur Wyn. It is published in a book under the same title by Curiad.
