= Gaeldom =

Gaeldom may refer to:

- Areas in which some Goidelic languages (Manx Gaelic and Irish) are spoken
- Gàidhealtachd, areas of Scotland where Gaelic is spoken

== See also ==
- Gaeltacht
