= Welsh Language Society =

Pressure group in support of the Welsh language

Cymdeithas yr Iaith
- Tafod y Ddraig (the Dragon's Tongue), the society logo
- Formation: 4 August 1962; 64 years ago
- Founders: Gareth Miles, Owain Owain, John Davies, Geraint Jones (Trefor)
- Type: Advocacy group
- Purpose: Welsh language rights Welsh independence Cymdeithasiaeth; Participatory democracy
- Headquarters: Aberystwyth, Wales
- Fields: Minority language movement
- Chairperson: Owain Meirion
- Website: cymdeithas.cymru

The Welsh Language Society (Welsh: Cymdeithas yr Iaith Gymraeg, also often abbreviated to Cymdeithas yr Iaith or just Cymdeithas in English) is a direct action pressure group in Wales campaigning for the right of Welsh people to use the Welsh language in every aspect of their lives. The chair of the Welsh Language Society since October 2025 is Owain Meirion. The organisation has been characterised as Welsh nationalist, and it officially supports Welsh independence. The Society was for a period Britain's largest protest group since the suffragettes – in terms of fines and the numbers sent to prison.

== History ==
=== 1960s ===
The Society was established in name on 4 August 1962 at Pontarddulais in South Wales, but did not have a constitution until 18 May 1963. The formation was at least partly inspired by the annual BBC Wales Radio Lecture given on 13 February 1962 by Saunders Lewis and entitled Tynged yr iaith (The fate of the language). Lewis was inspired to speak publicly by the results of the 1961 census, which showed a decrease in the proportion of Welsh speakers from 36% in 1931 to 26% in 1961. During his speech Lewis hailed Eileen and Trefor Beasley of Llangennech, a schoolteacher and miner, who during the 1950s enacted a campaign of civil disobedience against the local authority, the Inland Revenue, and the Westminster government who had continually refused their requests for Welsh medium communication. They are regarded the pioneers of the tactics that the Society would go on to use. Historian John Davies has said that the lecture was "the catalyst" for the formation of the Welsh Language Society, and the start of a period of direct-action agitation to enhance the status of the Welsh language. Its direct effect on the formation of the Society is described in a history of that society.

The speech had a particular influence on the students at the University College of Wales, Aberystwyth, and the members of the town’s Plaid Cymru branch. One of the branch's members, Gareth Miles, had been arrested in January 1962 and had ignored an English-only court summons. Plaid Cymru members in Aberystwyth had decided to support him by submitting a motion at Plaid Cymru’s annual conference in Pontarddulais, calling on all branches to organise activities that would force authorities to grant official status to the Welsh language. Edward Millward, who submitted the motion, argued that a new movement had to be founded to coordinate the campaign. He and John Davies, who had seconded the motion, were both elected secretaries of the society at its first meeting at the White Horse in Aberystwyth in October 1962.

The Society was named after the organisation founded by Dan Isaac Davies in 1885, which had aimed to expand the role of the Welsh language in the education system.

The Society's first campaign focused on court summonses, which were regarded as potent symbols of legal power and of the subordinate status of the Welsh language. The campaign itself challenged the language clause of the 1536 Act of Union which made English the sole language of administration and law in Wales.

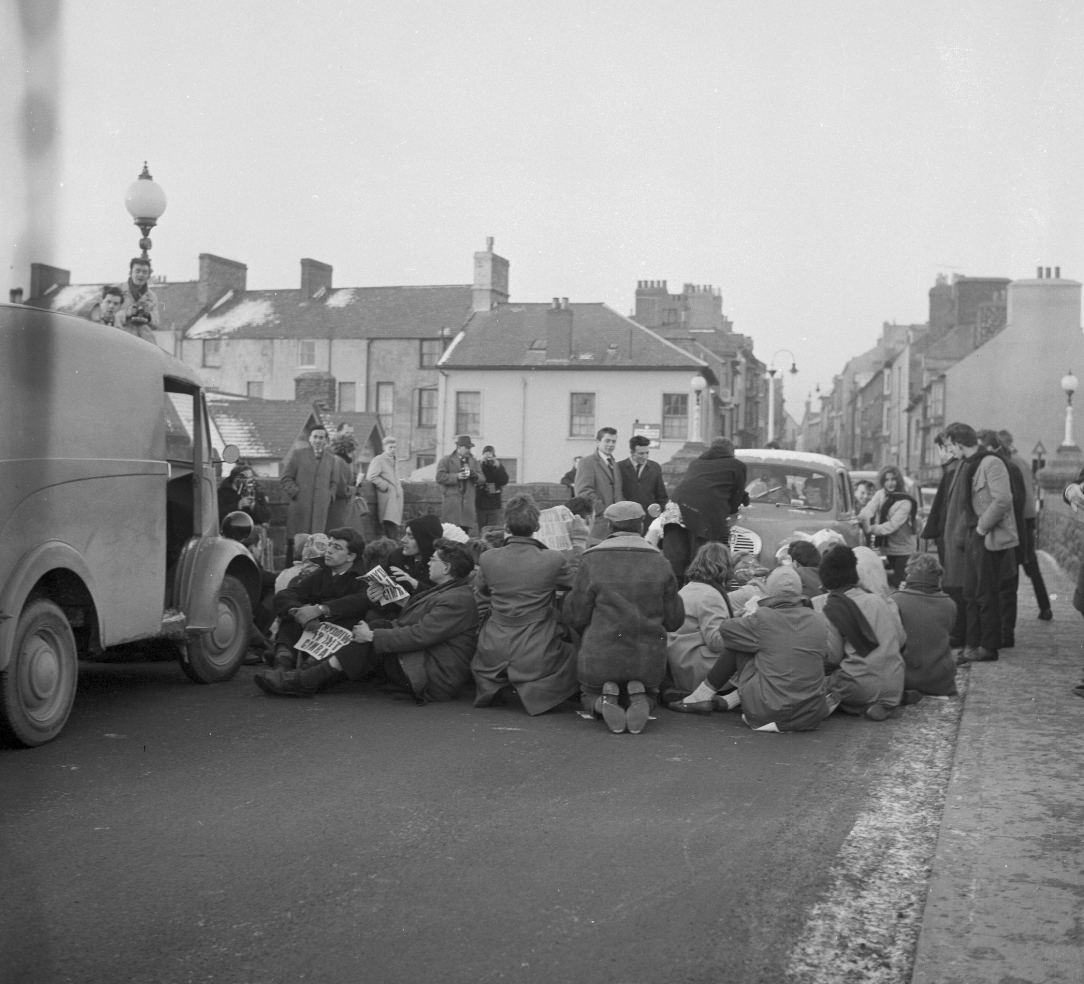
The first protest at Pont Trefechan in Aberystwyth, 1963

The Society's first public protest took place in February 1963 in Aberystwyth town centre, where members pasted posters on the post office in an attempt to be arrested and go to trial. When it became apparent that they would not be arrested for the posters, they then moved to Pont Trefechan in Aberystwyth, where around seventy members and supporters held a sit-in blocking road traffic for half an hour. The main objective was for as many protestors as possible to be arrested so that they could reject their summonses, but no arrests were made. The protest was widely publicised in the media, bringing attention to the demand for Welsh language summonses, within a few weeks after the protest a Welsh language summons was prepared by Cardiff magistrates. Under Secretary of State at the Home Office sent a letter to Aberystwyth magistrates noting: “The magistrates appears to be legally entitled to issue a summons in Welsh or English with a translation into Welsh”. Over time other courts in Wales began issuing bilingual summonses.

The first campaigns were for official status for the language, with a call for Welsh-language tax returns, schools, electoral forms, post office signs, birth certificates and so on. This was done through the formation of 'cells', the first operating in Bangor in April 1963 led by Owain Owain, who also founded and edited the Society's only publication, Tafod y Ddraig ('The Dragon's Tongue') and designed the logo.

At its first annual general meeting held in August 1963, the Society decided to postpone the direct action campaign, as the government had appointed Sir David Hughes Parry to form a committee to examine the legal status of the Welsh language. Members and supporters were urged to submit evidence to the committee, with officers of the Society corresponding extensively with local authorities and other bodies such as the Post Office, British Rail and the Tourist Board in relation to the status of the language. The Society returned to their direct action campaign in November 1965, organising a mass protest at the post office in Dolgellau, which was the culmination of a campaign to have the sign on the building changed from ‘Dolgelley’ to ‘Dolgellau’. The post office was occupied by over two hundred members and supporters. Following this the post office at Lampeter was occupied in December, and the one at Machynlleth in January.

Welsh Language Society protest at Tŷ Mawr Wybrnant, Penmachno, 1969.

The Society’s continued campaigning compelled the Labour government to pass the Welsh Language Act of 1967, which gave some rights to use the Welsh language in legal proceedings.

In 1967, the Society formally launched what became one of its best-known campaigns, against English-only road signs, which were regarded as the most visible symbols of the subordination of the Welsh language in Welsh public life. The first act of the campaign had in reality been carried out in August 1964 when the signs at ‘Trevine’ were removed during the night and replaced with signs bearing the Welsh name ‘Trefin’. In October 1967, three students from the University College of Wales, Aberystwyth, acted without the blessing of the Society’s Central Committee, and damaged English-only signs in the area. A general meeting the following day approved the new campaign. In January 1969, detailed guidelines, including what shade of green paint to use, were published in Tafod y Ddraig.

Several hundred activists attended the sign-painting rallies held at Wybrnant and Cefn-brith, and more than 200 members attended the Post-mawr rally in December 1970. An even greater number of activists were attracted to the night rallies which aimed to emulate the actions of the Daughters of Rebecca, during which thousands of English-only road signs were pulled down or destroyed. The road sign campaign resulted in the rapid growth of the Society’s membership to over 2,000 at its peak. A total of 185 activists appeared in court in connection with the destruction of English-only road signs. When 18 members of the Society were fined a total of £111 for damaging signs at the Betws-y-Coed magistrates' court, 9 other members protested against the fines by singing the Welsh National Anthem from the public gallery, and were escorted out by police.

In 1968 a sit-in was held at the news and television studio and the newsroom department of the BBC at Broadway, Cardiff, by members of the Society. The sit-in called for the BBC to use more Welsh. Activists at the sit-in at the Cardiff studio cut telephone wires and stapled a photograph of a Free Wales Army cap to the picture of the Secretary of State for Wales, George Thomas.

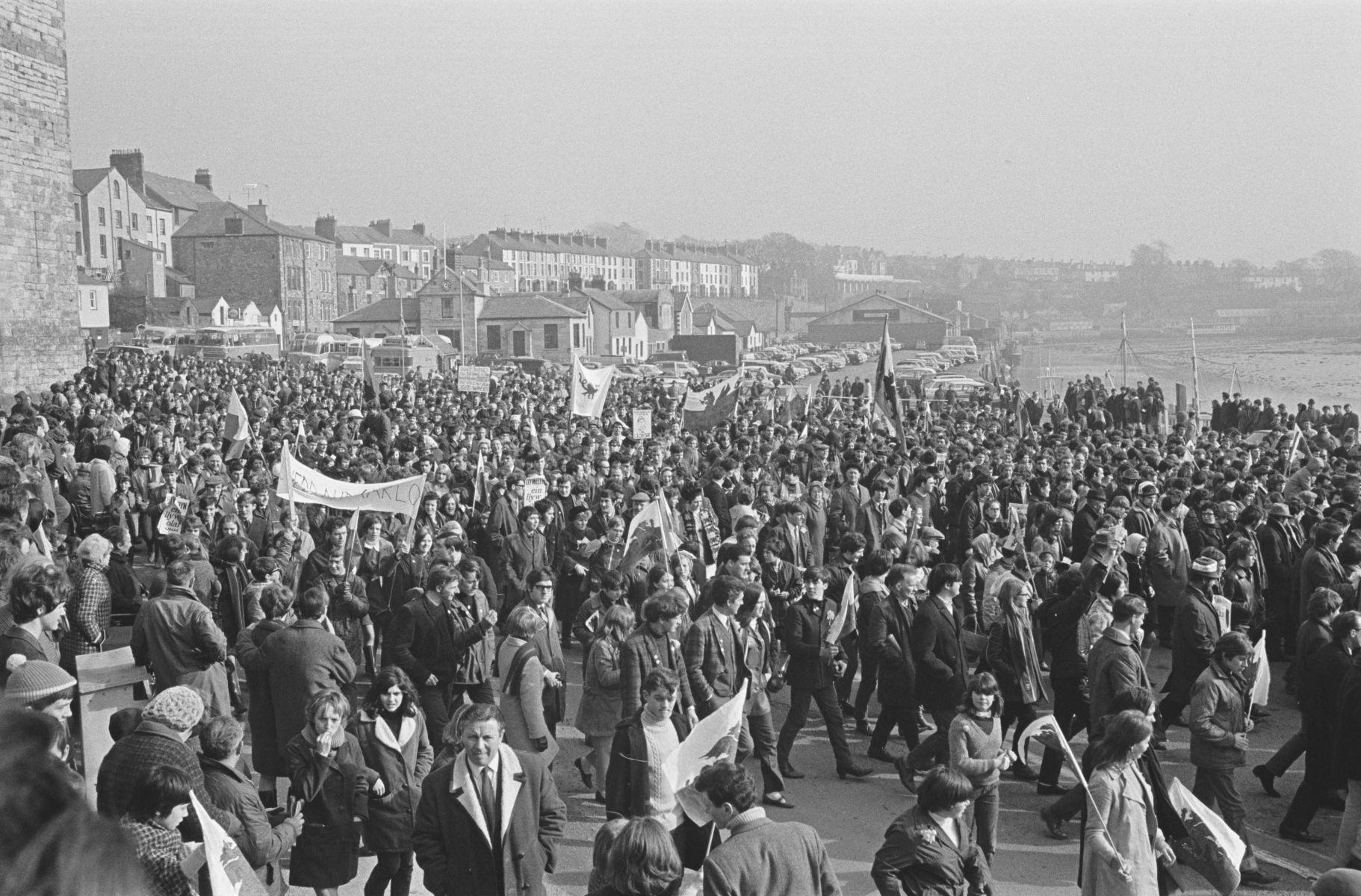
Anti-investiture rally in Caernarfon, 1969.

In the lead up to the Investiture of the Prince of Wales in 1969, the Society organised numerous anti-Investiture protests and rallies. When they protested against the Prince Charle's visit to Cardiff in July 1968, the Western Mail describing them as “extremists, hooligans and anarchists". On 1 March 1969, two motorcades of cars converged on Caernarfon for an anti-Investiture protest, one had travelled from North Wales and the other from South Wales, a total of 500 cars and 2000 members and supporters of the Society took part. During the 1969 Urdd National Eisteddfod, members of the Society disrupted a speech by Prince Charles, standing on one side of the marquee and holding up posters which read "Not Welcome" and "Remember Llywelyn". On the 28 June 1969 the Society held an anti-investiture rally at Cilmeri, the site of the death of Llywelyn ap Gruffydd. A recorded message from Saunders Lewis was played for the crowd.

In October 1969, during the trial of three members of the Society for painting over English-only road signs, about 60 to 70 members of the Society staged a sit-in at the Cardigan magistrates' court. It took ten police officers an hour to remove them, with several arrests being made.

=== 1970s ===
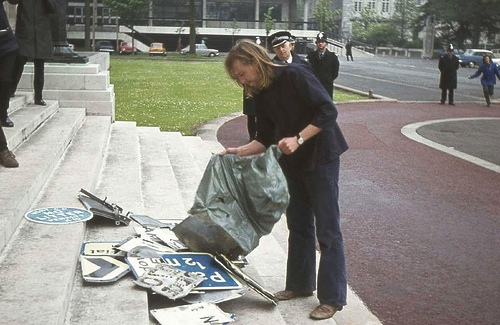
Protestors dump English-only road signs at the steps of the Welsh Office in Cathays Park, Cardiff. This started in 1970 and ended in 1972.

In the 1970s, the Society changed its strategy, shifting away from campaigning for specific rights and towards addessing the socio-economic factors that it saw as undermining the Welsh language. This was reflected in the publication in 1972 of ‘Maniffesto Cymdeithas yr Iaith Gymraeg’. The manifesto set the language issue in its wider historical context and set out what is described as the ‘revolutionary’ conditions deemed necessary to ensure a revival of its fortunes.

After refusing to pay fines for defacing English-only road signs, Welsh singer and activist Dafydd Iwan was imprisoned in January 1970, during his imprisonment the Society held 14 demonstrations in across Wales, many of which involved the occupation of magistrates courts and other public buildings.

On 17 February 1970, members of the Society, including Dafydd Iwan's brother, Huw Ceredig, occupied the main room of the Highways Department at the Welsh Office in Cardiff. Police broke down a door and removed the protestors. The action was in support of the campaign for bilingual road signs.

In July 1970, members of the Society broke into and occupied the Granada Television studios in Manchester in protest against English programmes being broadcast to Wales from the studio. They damaged equipment including monitors, cables and telephone wires, taking the company off the air. In connection to the raid, Ffred Ffransis, then secretary of the Society, Gronw ab Islwyn, then chairman, Myrddin Williams and Philip Wyn Davies, were sentenced to between six and twelve months imprisonment. After being sentenced, Ffransis shouted at the judge: "You will never kill the Welsh language, English judge".

Welsh Language Society protest at Bangor demanding Dafydd Iwan's release from jail, 1970.

In August and September of 1970, members of the Society joined local farmers in blocking a road to prevent water engineers of the Usk River Authority from surveying the Heol Senni area as a possible reservoir site.

Following the closure of a school in Bryncoes by the Caernarfonshire Education Authority, in September 1970, members of the Society including Dafydd Iwan occupied the school, removing the padlocked yard gates and forcing open the main doors. The members barricaded themselves in a classroom and spent the night there, sleeping in blankets provided by the villagers. The demonstration was in support of parents from the village who refused to send their children to a school three miles away and demanded the school be reopened.

In November 1971, the Society demonstrated alongside Conradh na Gaeilge outside the British Embassy in Dublin, protesting against the British Government’s policies regarding the Irish language in Northern Ireland and the Welsh language in Wales.

On 24 November 1971, three members of the Society climbed onto the roof of the Shire Hall in Llangefni, holding a 12 hour sit-in protest intended to draw attention to 7 members of the Society who had been imprisoned.

In March 1972, 50 members of the Society launched a campaign for “fishing rights for the Welsh” by fishing in a stretch of the Afon Lledr without a Gwynedd River Authority licence. The Society argued that fishing rights had become too expensive for Welsh angling clubs, while wealthier English clubs were able to afford them.

In July 1972, Lord Hailsham visited University College of North Wales, Bangor, to address a meeting of the Magistrates' Association. Around 300 activists and supporters of the Society 'stormed' the university by force, breaking through a police line, with several being removed and arrested by the police. The protest was organised in response to Hailsham's remarks on on the Society's activities, in which he had compared them to the "baboons of the IRA".

Welsh Language Society protest during Lord Hailsham's visit to UCNW, 1972

The Society campaigned to create employment opportunities and to reduce the out-migration of young people from rural Wales, in addition to launching campaigns in industrial areas against the closure of mines and factories, including the steelworks at Shotton and Ebbw Vale.

Members of the Society also mounted campaigns in rural Wales against second homes, and supported powers which would enable the new Welsh counties to buy empty houses and let them to local people. With the Society temporarily occupied a number of second homes across Wales throughout the 1970s, gluing keyholes and painting slogans such as "Wales is not for Sale" on the windows. The Society also disrupted auctions selling second homes, such as in Pwllheli in July 1972, where 50 members of the Society disrupted an auction that was selling five cottages of the Llŷn Peninsula with a sit-in protest. With police were brought in from across Gwynedd to remove the protestors from the auction, with 20 of them having to be carried out.

Welsh Language Society protest obstructing an auction in Caernarfon, 1972.

In June 1973, four members of the Society were imprisoned for causing damage to Post Office vehicles, they had damaged 30 windscreens and 32 sets of headlamps, their action was in protest of the Post Office's attitude towards the Welsh language.

On 23 August 1974, seven members of the Society took over part of the Labour Party’s headquarters at Transport House, London. They repeated the demand for a Welsh language television channel, leaving the building after talking to a Transport House representative who promised to pass on a letter to Lord Harris, Minister of State for Home Affairs.

In December 1975, five members of the Society interrupted a Commons debate on an Armed Forces Bill, shouting slogans demanding a Welsh-language television channel, eventually being carried out from the public gallery.

On 25 March 1976, nine members of the Society occupied Inland Revenue offices in Chester, destroying files and throwing papers out of windows. The action was in support of a Welsh-language television channel. A Society spokesman said: “We wanted to cause inconvenience at a central government office”.

At the beginning of the 1970s, the society began to campaign for a Welsh-language radio and television service. Radio Cymru was established in 1977, but in 1979 the Conservative government under Margaret Thatcher announced that it would not keep its election promise to establish a separate Welsh-language television channel. Some protesters refused to buy television licences and others climbed up television masts and invaded television studios.

There was much damage to radio and television transmitters:

- Blaenplwyf transmitter was damaged on Monday 7 February 1977, costing £25,000, Dyfed–Powys Police arrested the leader at his home at Cenarth; there was another break-in on Monday 19 November 1979, which included John Rowlands and Geraint H. Jenkins
- Waltham was turned off from 10 pm on Thursday 2 November 1978; the group had broken into The Wrekin on the same night, but had turned off the wrong switch.
- Midhurst was damaged on Thursday 8 February 1979; BBC1 transmissions were restored by Friday but BBC2 took three more days; it caused £15,700 of damage; 23 year old Hywel Pennar, a student at St David's Lampeter, was jailed for 9 months; he was the son of Pennar Davies, the Principal from 1959 to 1979 of Swansea Theological College
- Sudbury in Suffolk was damaged on Thursday 15 March 1979 with £20,000 of damage.

More than fifty were incarcerated for these protests, for periods varying from one night in a police cell to a year’s imprisonment in an English prison. Hundreds of people supported the campaign by refusing to pay their television licence, 250 separate cases were brought against 500 individuals for this offence between 1971 and 1981.

=== 1980s ===
Gwynfor Evans in 1979.

In May 1980, Gwynfor Evans, then president of Plaid Cymru, threatened to fast until death unless the government honoured its election pledge to establish a Welsh-language television channel. Evans’ protest attracted widespread sympathy and support, even outside the Welsh-speaking areas, including the industrial areas of South Wales which were experiencing mass unemployment precipitated by the government.

In support of Evans’ threatened fast, on the 18 July 1980 around 70 members of the society blocked the road in front of the Prime Minister Margaret Thatcher’s car during her visit to the Anglesey Aluminium plant in Holyhead, bringing it to a halt. Eggs were then thrown at the car and the police escort, as demonstrators chanted: “Gwynfor, Gwynfor”. At the 1980 National Eisteddfod near Gowerton, members of the Society raided the display stand of the Independent Broadcasting Authority, around 40 demonstrators tore up leaflets, spray painted slogans, and pasted up posters supporting Gwynfor Evans' hunger strike. When Secretary of State for Wales, Nicholas Edwards, attempted to attend the Eisteddfod on the 5 August 1980, 50 members of the society blocked the road and trapped him in his car for 10 minutes until police cleared the road. They reportedly chanted "Welsh channel now" as they banged on the roof of the car and kicked the doors. His car was halted again on the 11 August near the village of Crymmych, 18 members of the society used vehicles to block to road, again demanding a Welsh-language television channel, the protest lasted 30 minutes. The government reversed its position and a Welsh-language TV channel, S4C, was launched in 1982.

In November 1980, members of the Society occupied the Conservative Party’s offices in Llandudno in protest of the government’s economic policies, leaving after three hours.

Following the establishment of S4C, the early 1980s was a period of general inactivity for the Society, which can be attributed to a wider loss of morale in the Welsh nationalist movement found itself following failure of the 1979 devolution referendum. The Society’s 1982 manifesto was published to clarify its aims and to give its campaigning a new direction. The manifesto was the culmination of debate within the Society which centred on the concept of ‘Cymdeithasiaeth’, an ideology based on decentralisation, participatory democracy, and cooperation. This was reflected in the campaigns the Society embarked on during the 1980s.

In June 1981, following the imprisonment of the society’s chairman, Wayne Williams, at Bristol Crown Court on a conspiracy charge for damaging a broadcasting installation, 100-150 members of the Society occupied police stations in 10 towns across Wales, protesting against the use of conspiracy laws.

At the 1982 National Eisteddfod in Swansea, members of the Society raided the Welsh Office pavilion, tearing up and scattering brochures and painting slogans on advertising panels, the Society claimed that building developments in popular tourist areas of North Wales had been pushing house prices beyond the reach of local people.

During the 1983 National Eisteddfod in Llangefni, two members of the Society climbed to the top of the Menai Suspension Bridge and displayed a large banner which read: "No welcome to newcomers to Anglesey or the Malvinas", while during the night slogans calling for "Welsh homes for Welsh people" were painted on holiday cottages at Cil-y-Graig near Llanfairpwllgwyngyll. Five members also staged a six-day fast outside the Welsh Office stand at the festival itself, this was in a bid to draw attention to Welsh-language education.

The Society actively campaigned in support of farmers affected by the introduction of milk quotas during the agricultural crisis of the 1980s, opposing the closure of dairies in Newcastle Emlyn in 1983 and Johnstown in 1986.

In October 1984, three members of the Society, Meinir Ffransis, Lleucu Morgan and Dafydd Morgan Lewis, broke into Cardiff headquarters of the Conservative Party in Wales, causing £5,000 worth of damage to files, equipment, furniture, and a portrait of the Prime Minister Margaret Thatcher. The Society said it was part of a protest campaign for an independent body to develop Welsh-language education.

On 7 November 1984, 30 members of the Society locked themselves in the Inland Revenue office in Bangor, in protest at what the Society described as poor facilities for teaching Welsh in schools. Then on 9 November, members of the Society also painted slogans on Inland Revenue offices in Wrexham, Colwyn Bay and Rhyl, after the Government and the Welsh Joint Education Committee rejected the idea of a development board for Welsh education.

Members of the Society were also prominent in their support of the 1984-85 miners strike, collecting food and money for the miners and their families, providing holidays for their children, and held meetings throughout Wales to explain how important supporting mining communities was to the language. Members of the Society were even on the picket lines alongside miners at Abernant Colliery, Point of Ayr Colliery, and Cynheidre Colliery.

In January 1986, members of the Society occupied part of the Newtown College of Further Education, including the office of the college principal, Bernard Wakeley, in support of expanded Welsh-language education.

In August 1986, two members of the Society broke into the constituency office of Secretary of State for Wales, Nicholas Edwards, in Haverfordwest, causing damage inside the office and later giving themselves up to police. On the same day, other members broke into a government building in Rhos-on-Sea, took documents and painted slogans on the walls. Both actions were a part of the Society’s campaign for a Welsh-language development board.

On 30 December 1986, members of the Society began squatting in an empty house on the high street in Blaenau Ffestiniog. The house was owned by a couple from London and had been on the market for over a year. The Society called on the council to buy empty properties like it, repair them and rent them to local families, noting that 667 people were on the council house waiting list in Meirionnydd.

In 1987, in response to what it described as Welsh people being priced out of the housing market by incomers from affluent parts of south-east England, the Society set up the Nid yw Cymru ar Werth ("Wales is not for Sale") working group. The Society called on the government to control the housing market and to give priority to local people. To publicise the demand, it occupied second homes, painted slogans on auction houses, and held rallies across the Wales.

In March 1988, members of the Society broke into the constituency office of Secretary of State for Wales Peter Walker in Worcester, demanding more funding, power and responsibility for the Welsh Language Education Development Committee.

=== 1990s ===
On 21 February 1990, 20 members of the Society locked themselves in the Welsh Office in Rhos-on-Sea, occupying the building for more than an hour in protest of proposals for a Welsh Language Board before eventually being removed by police.

In March 1990, two members of the Society broke into the Caernarfon Conservative Association's constituency office and damaged the office of David Elwyn Jones, leaving a letter for him demanding a comprehensive Welsh Language Act. Jones then ordered the two to leave the premises. In July 1990, in reaction to the vandalism of the Caernarfon Conservative Association office in March, Prime Minister Margaret Thatcher attacked the Society, declaring that she would not be blackmailed by ‘criminal violence’ into yielding to demands for new Welsh-language laws.

In November 1990, during a demonstration organised by the Society on the grounds of the Welsh Office at Rhos-on-Sea to demand additional funding for Welsh-language education, members climbed onto the building's flat roof and used it as a stage to address the crowd. One member, Ifor ap Glyn, was arrested during the demonstration for spraying a slogan onto one of the walls of the building.

On January 4 1991, two members of the Society, Branwen Nicholas and Alun Llwyd, broke into the Property Service Agency office at the Welsh Office in Rhos-on-Sea, where they damaged computers and telephones, tearing up and scattering files around the office, and sprayed the slogan “Property Act Now” and the Society’s symbol on the walls. In September 1991, they were each sentenced to six months imprisonment. The Society and Conradh na Gaeilge held a joint picket outside HM Prison Liverpool the same month in protest of the sentence. In December 1991, the Society held the Rhyw Ddydd, un Dydd concert in Pontrhydfendigaid, dedicated to Nicholas and Llwyd, who had been recently released. The concert was originally conceived by Llwyd, and was intended to raise money for Society. In total, 31 bands and performers from across Wales took part, including Geraint Jarman, Heather Jones, Bryn Fôn, Y Cyrff, Bob Delyn a’r Ebillion, Ffa Coffi Pawb, Steve Eaves a’r Driawd, and Aros Mae. A compilation album dedicated to Llwyd and Nicholas, named O’r Gad/No Translation, featuring bands that played at the concert, was released by Ankst.

In October 1992, during a rally attended by more than 500 members and supporters outside the Welsh Office in Cardiff, members of the Society climbed onto the roof of the Welsh Office in Cardiff and placed a banner calling for a new Welsh Language Act.

T-shirt commemorating the cancellation of Elizabeth II's visit to Aberystwyth, 1996.

On 31 May 1996, around 200 members of the Society and students demonstrated against a visit by Queen Elizabeth II to Aberystwyth, where she opened a new extension to the National Library of Wales. Demonstrators climbed over police barriers and broke through a police cordon in an attempt to block the route of her motorcade, but were stopped by police officers. Others held signs reading “Go Home Lizzie”. Her visit to the Glaciology Centre at the University's Institute of Earth Studies was cancelled after her protection officer and Dyfed-Powys assistant chief constable Keith Turner advised her to cancel the engagement. A Society spokesperson said that the extension should have been opened by “a person with a connection to Wales”. It was the only time Elizabeth II had to cancel an engagement in the United Kingdom.

In May 1997, members of the Society scaled Craig Goch Dam in the Elan Valley, painting three large slogans stating "Wales is not for Sale" across it. This was done in protest of plans to flood further Welsh valleys to build reservoirs.

=== 2000s ===
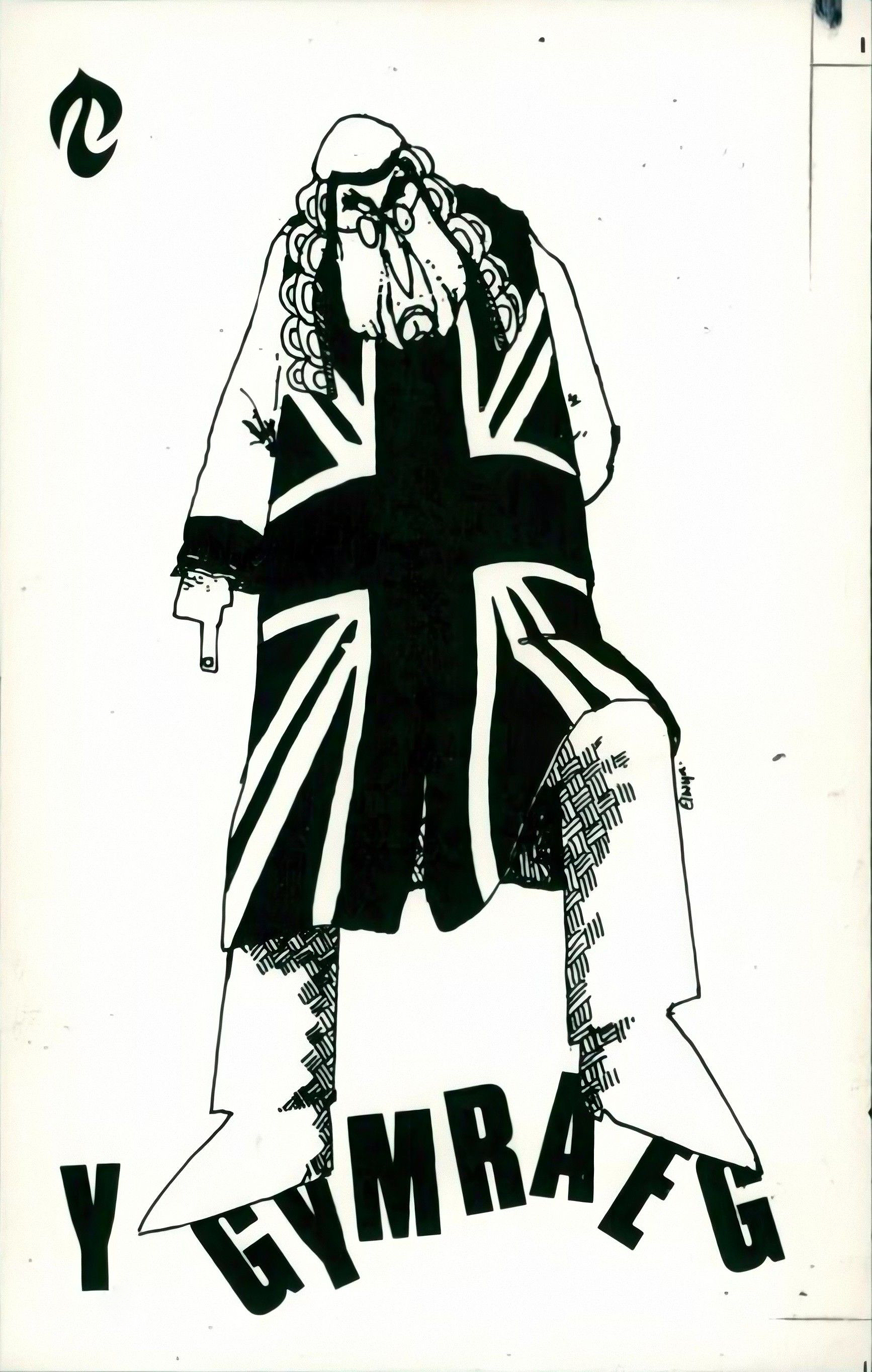
A political poster used in the early 1970s depicting a judge wearing a garment styled as the flag of the United Kingdom, trampling over the words; 'Y Gymraeg' (The Welsh [language]) which was created after 11 Welsh speaking protestors were arrested

On 24 July 2004 (five weeks after launching), Radio Carmarthenshire's studios in Narberth were invaded by eleven activists from the Welsh Language Society. They were protesting against Radio Carmarthenshire's decision to limit the amount of its Welsh-language programming. The offices and studios were stormed during a live broadcast, taking Radio Carmarthenshire and Pembrokeshire off-air for fifteen minutes. According to Keri Jones (who later branded the members of the group as "terrorists"), his head of sales was injured, and needed hospital treatment for a fractured wrist sustained during the scuffles which ensued. Police arrested eleven activists, and subsequently released them pending further enquiries. The chair of the movement Steffan Cravos was later found not guilty of causing grievous bodily harm.

The society claimed that 50% of the population in Carmarthenshire speak Welsh as a first language, but less than 5% of Radio Carmarthenshire's output was in Welsh. As a result of complaints and pressure from the society and individuals, the United Kingdom's broadcasting watchdog Ofcom issued Radio Carmarthenshire with a 'yellow card' warning in late 2004; any further claims of the station not conforming to its licence agreement would result in the station being severely reprimanded by Ofcom.

=== Response to the 2011 Census results ===
Following the 2011 Census results, the group held a series of rallies across Wales. In the first rally in Caernarfon in December 2012, the group published its Maniffesto Byw ('Living Manifesto') which outlined tens of policies designed to strengthen the language. The society launched the "Dwi eisiau byw yn Gymraeg" (I want to live in Welsh) slogan at the same rally.

On 6 February 2013 and 4 July 2013, deputations of the society met First Minister Carwyn Jones to press for urgent policy changes in light of the Census results.

A revised version of the Maniffesto Byw was published in July 2013, following a public consultation and an extraordinary general meeting when a number of amendments to the manifesto were adopted.

In August 2013, the group wrote to Carwyn Jones giving him six months to state his intention to deliver six policy changes for the benefit of the language:

1. Addysg Gymraeg i Bawb (Welsh-medium Education for All)
2. Tegwch Ariannol i'r Gymraeg (Financial Fairness for the Welsh language)
3. Gweinyddu'n fewnol yn Gymraeg (Internal Government in Welsh)
4. Safonau Iaith i Greu Hawliau Clir (Language Standards to Create Clear Rights)
5. Trefn Cynllunio er budd ein Cymunedau (A Planning System for the benefit of our Communities)
6. Y Gymraeg yn greiddiol i Ddatblygu Cynaliadwy (Welsh as central to Sustainable Development)

Carwyn Jones had made no such statement of intent by 1 February 2014, and the group started a direct action campaign and held a series of protests across the country.

=== Ongoing campaigns ===
- In 2015, the society began calling for Welsh medium education to be extended to every school pupil in Wales, to 'give them the ability to communicate and work' in the language. This call was supported by the linguist David Crystal and academic Christine James. These calls include a call for an Education Act for Welsh language education for all.
- Sustainable communities; a property act to help tackle the housing crisis and second home issue.
- The devolution of broadcasting to Wales.

== Successful campaigns ==
According to the language group's website, its campaigns have contributed to securing the following policy changes for the language:

- 1960s – Bilingual road signs
- 1970s – Welsh-language television channel campaign and establishment of S4C, the world's only Welsh-language television channel, in 1982.
- 1993 – Welsh Language Act 1993 enacted, requiring public bodies to offer limited Welsh-language services
- 2000s – Campaign for new Welsh Language Act and official status for the language under the Welsh Language (Wales) Measure 2011
- 2011 – Welsh-medium higher education college, Coleg Cymraeg Cenedlaethol, established

== Campaign areas ==
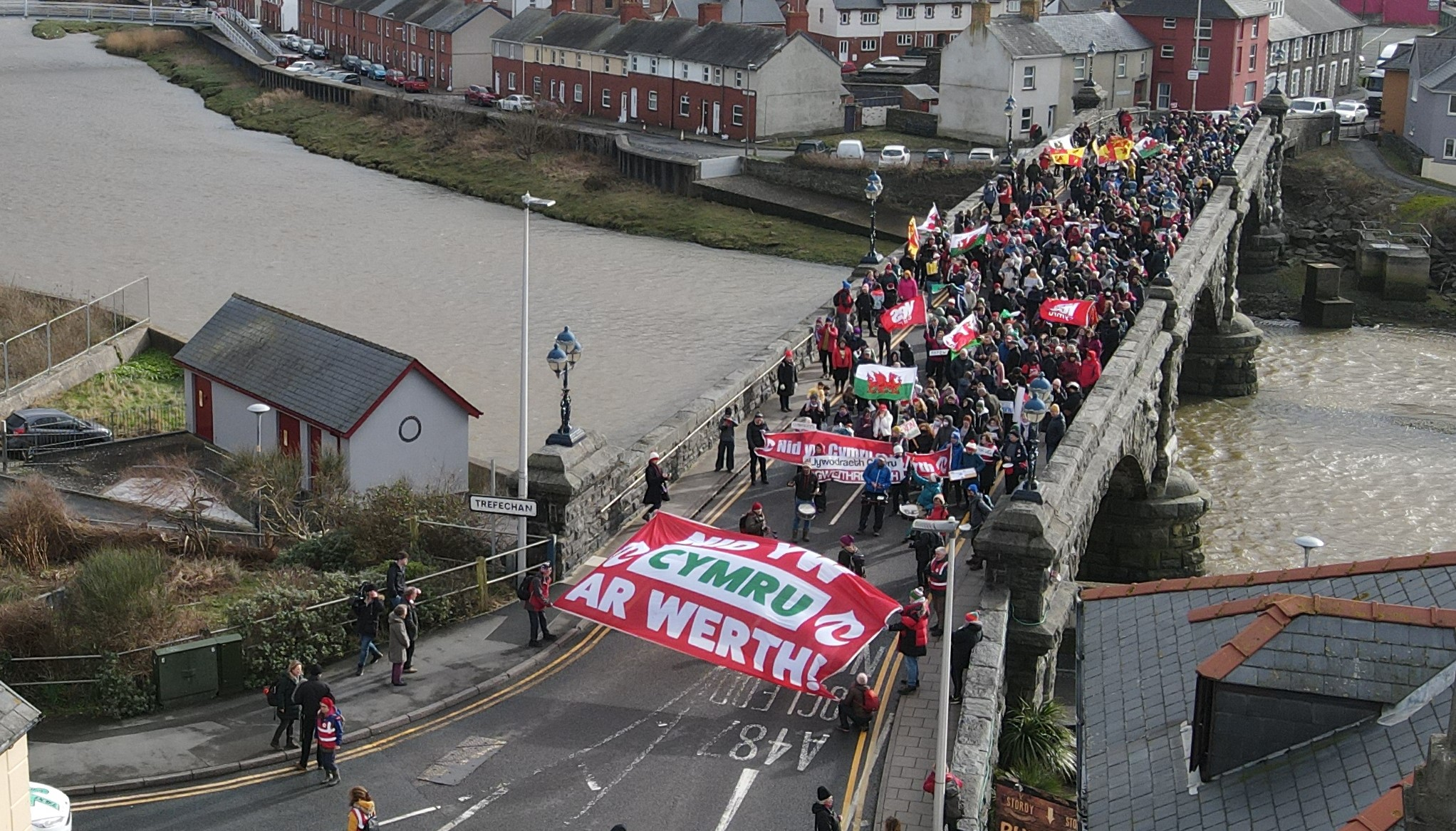
Nid yw Cymru ar Werth protest in Aberystwyth, February 2022

The principal campaigns can be divided into four major areas:

=== Hawliau i'r Gymraeg (Rights to the Welsh language) ===
At the beginning of the 21st century, the society started a campaign for a new Welsh Language Act. The Welsh Language Act 1993 declared that Welsh should be treated on an equal basis with English, but the society argued that this fell short of what is needed.

In 2007, the society published its own Welsh Language Measure, draft legislation which would amongst other things establish official status for the Welsh language and rights to use it, and establish the office of the Welsh Language Commissioner.

In 2011, based in large part on the society's proposals, the National Assembly for Wales passed the Welsh Language (Wales) Measure 2011, which established the Welsh language as an official language of Wales, and introduced the Welsh Language Commissioner.

=== Cymunedau Cynaliadwy (Sustainable Communities) ===
This group leads on a number of matters, including housing and planning policy. Since the 1980s the group has called for a Property Act to increase the number of communities where Welsh is the main language of the area as well as tackling income inequality and environmental problems.

On 11 March 2014, the group published its own draft "Property and Planning Bill for the benefit of our communities (Wales) 2014" which would enshrine the six main principles of its proposal for a Property Act as well as establishing the Welsh language as a statutory material consideration in the planning system.

=== Dyfodol Digidol (Digital Future) ===
This group campaigns for rights to see and hear the language. This includes campaigns for investment in Radio Cymru and S4C, as well as the presence of the Welsh language online.

=== Grŵp Addysg (Education Group) ===
Welsh medium education is available in most areas of Wales in the primary and secondary stages of school education. Welsh second-language GCSEs are compulsory in English medium education. This group demands improvements and also massive expansion in further (college) and higher (university) education. This mainly includes a Welsh language federal college, which would be a multi-sited college that provides courses and resources in the medium of Welsh.

== Current volunteers and staff ==
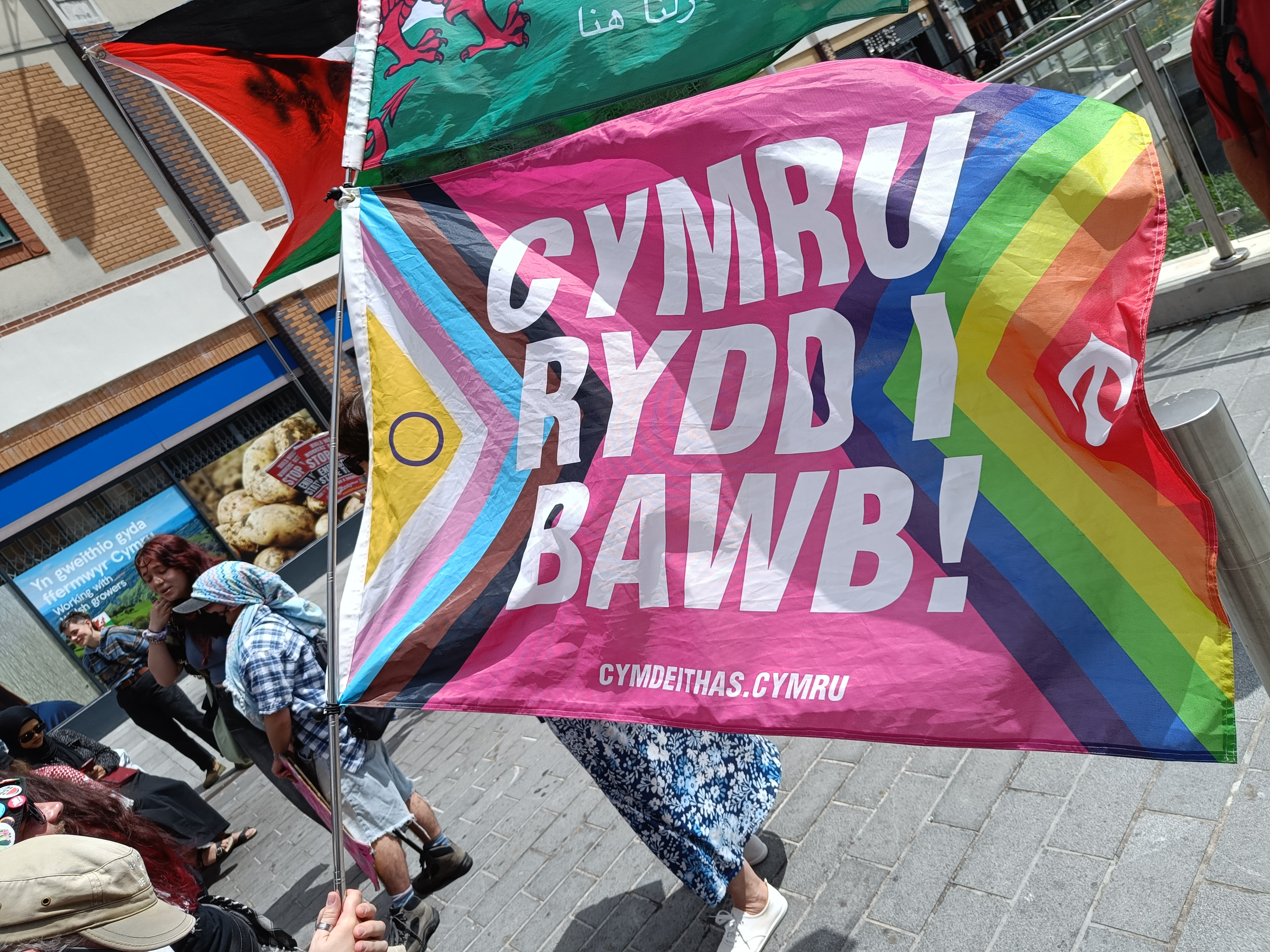
A Pride flag from the Welsh Language Society, reading "A free Wales for everyone!"

Current board of movement

- Chair - Owain Meirion
- Vice-chairperson of campaigns - Siân Howys
- Vice-chairperson of communication - Mirian Owen
- Vice-chairperson of administrative duties - Currently vacant
- Treasurer - Danny Grehan
- Officer of raising money and Membership - Currently vacant
- Cultural officer - Aled Thomas
- Social media officer - Jac Jolly
- College connections officer - Siôn Dafydd
- Editor of Y Tafod - Mared Llywelyn Williams
- Officer of learners – Richard Morse
- International deputy - Felix Parker-Price
- Chair of education - Siôn Dafydd
- Vice-chairperson of education - Kirran Lochhead Strang
- Chair of the Sustainable Communities Group - Jeff Smith
- Vice-chairperson of the Sustainable Communities Group - Dylan Lewis-Rowlands
- Chair of the Digital Futures Group - Carl Morris
- Vice-chairperson of the Digital Futures Group - Aled Thomas
- Chair of Right to the Welsh Language – Aled Thomas
- Vice-chairperson of Right to the Welsh Language - Currently vacant
- Chair of Health and Well Being Group - Gwerfyl Roberts

The society is a largely voluntary movement, which also employs five full-time members of staff, one at its head office in Aberystwyth, one in its Caernarfon office, two in its Cardiff office and one in the Llanfihangel-ar-Arth office.

== List of chairpersons ==
- 1962–1963 – Tedi Millward and John Davies (secretaries)
- 1963–1965 – John Daniel
- 1965–1966 – Cynog Dafis
- 1966–1967 – Emyr Llywelyn first and then Gareth Miles
- 1967–1968 – Gareth Miles
- 1968–1971 – Dafydd Iwan
- 1971–1973 – Gronw ab Islwyn
- 1973–1974 – Emyr Hywel
- 1974–1975 – Ffred Ffransis
- 1975–1977 – Wynfford James
- 1977–1979 – Rhodri Williams
- 1979–1981 – Wayne Williams
- 1981–1982 – Meri Huws
- 1982–1984 – Angharad Tomos
- 1984–1985 – Karl Davies
- 1985–1987 – Toni Schiavone
- 1987–1989 – Helen Prosser
- 1989–1990 – Sian Howys
- 1990–1993 – Alun Llwyd
- 1993–1994 – Aled Davies
- 1994–1996 – Rocet Arwel Jones
- 1996–1998 – Gareth Kiff
- 1998–1999 – Branwen Niclas
- 1999–2001 –
- 2001–2002 – Branwen Brian Evans and Aled Davies (co-chairs)
- 2002–2004 – Huw Lewis
- 2004–2007 – Steffan Cravos
- 2007–2008 – Hywel Griffiths
- 2008–2010 – Menna Machreth
- 2010–2013 – Bethan Williams
- 2013–2014 – Robin Farrar
- 2014–2016 – Jamie Bevan
- 2016–2018 – Heledd Gwyndaf
- 2018–2019 – Osian Rhys
- 2019–2020 – Bethan Ruth
- 2020–2022 – Mabli Siriol
- 2022–2023 – Robat Idris
- 2023-2025 – Joseff Gnagbo
- 2025 - present – Owain Meirion

== Notable members, former members and supporters ==
- John Davies
- Meg Elis
- Tedi Millward
- Gareth Miles
- Meic Stephens
- Owain Owain
- Emyr Llewelyn
- Ned Thomas
- Meredydd Evans
- Pennar Davies
- Eirian Llwyd
- R. Tudur Jones
- Bobi Jones
- Ffred Ffransis
- Meinir Ffransis
- Meirion Pennar
- Meri Huws
- Steve Eaves
- Bryn Fôn
- Steffan Cravos
- Gwenno Teifi
- Jamie Bevan

== See also ==
- Barn (Welsh magazine)
- Ceartas, an equivalent campaign in Scotland, founded in 1981
- Dyfodol I'r Iaith
- Golwg
- Y Dydd Olaf
