= Y Fro Gymraeg =

Main Welsh-speaking areas of Wales

The proportion of respondents in the 2021 census who said they could speak Welsh.

Y Fro Gymraeg (Welsh for 'the Welsh language area'; pronounced [ə vroː ˈɡəmrɑːɨɡ]) is a name often used to refer to the linguistic area in Wales where the Welsh language is used by the majority or a large part of the population; it is the heartland of the Welsh language and comparable in that respect to the Gàidhealtachd of Scotland and Gaeltacht of Ireland. It has no official government recognition.

== Importance ==
The importance of Y Fro Gymraeg to the rest of Wales was formulated over a few months by a Bangor college lecturer, Owain Owain, in January 1964, when he published in his Tafod y Ddraig magazine a map outlining Y Fro. In an article dated 12 November 1964, he wrote: Enillwn y Fro Gymraeg, ac fe enillir Cymru, ac oni enillir Y Fro Gymraeg, nid Cymru a enillir ('We win Y Fro Gymraeg, and Wales will be won, and unless Y Fro Gymraeg is won, it is not Wales that will be won').

== Areas ==
The Welsh-speaking, Welsh-identifying group is perhaps most distinctive and largely centred upon the north and west of Wales. This area is designated y Fro Gymraeg. The Welsh-identifying, non-Welsh-speaking group is most prevalent in the traditional south Wales area and labelled Welsh Wales. The British identifying non-Welsh speaking group dominates the remainder of Wales, described therefore as British Wales. – David Balsom (1985)

A generation or two ago one could say that almost all of western Wales, from Anglesey to parts of Pembrokeshire and Carmarthenshire, lay in the Bro, and that it also included significant parts of western Powys and of the former county of Clwyd, but today the territory of the language as a majority language has shrunk. A substantial portion of four Welsh counties lies within Y Fro Gymraeg, which also includes other communities in surrounding counties. The four main counties with a majority of Welsh-speaking inhabitants are Gwynedd, Carmarthenshire (Sir Gaerfyrddin or Sir Gâr in Welsh), Ceredigion and Anglesey (Ynys Môn), although even in these counties one cannot say that every town and village is a Welsh stronghold. Surrounding areas often included in the Bro, with a significant percentage of Welsh speakers, include parts of Neath Port Talbot (Castell-nedd Port Talbot), parts of western Powys, northern Pembrokeshire (Sir Benfro), the uplands of Conwy, the uplands and countryside of Denbighshire (Sir Ddinbych), Flintshire (Sir y Fflint) and parts of the district of Swansea (Abertawe).

== Education ==
Education in Y Fro Gymraeg is generally through the medium of Welsh, which accounts for about 70% of the school timetable, on average.

== See also ==
- List of Welsh principal areas by percentage Welsh language
- Arfor
- Welsh Tract
- Y Wladfa
