= Ceartas =

1980s Scottish protest group

In the early 1980s in Scotland, Ceartas (Scottish Gaelic pronunciation: [ˈkʲʰarˠʃt̪əs̪]; meaning 'justice') was a protest group which attempted to publicise the unequal treatment of the Gaelic language.

The group was founded in 1981, in the wake of the failure of MP Donald Stewart's private member's bill, which had sought for Gaelic the same status enjoyed by Welsh in Wales. Some of those who travelled to London to observe the progress of the bill, most of them students from Aberdeen, Edinburgh or Glasgow, met afterwards to discuss non-violent direct action, a tactic which had played a key role in the campaigns of Cymdeithas yr Iaith in Wales. Members of the group included Iain Taylor, Mark Wringe, Alan Esslemont, Stephen Maceachern, Anne Martin, Kay Matheson and the MacDonald brothers. Picking up on the ongoing road sign controversy, they defaced road signs around Scotland, and painted the slogan Ceartas airson na Gàidhlig (Justice for Gaelic) across roads. An anonymous statement was released to the press, resulting in widespread public attention. Ultimately Iain Taylor was arrested, though never convicted.

In court, a witness on Taylor's behalf attempted to give evidence in Gaelic and was forbidden to do so. This contradicted a 19th-century precedent which allowed the use of Gaelic in court, resulting in a legal review which established the principle that Gaelic could be used in court only if the witness could not speak English.

== Sources ==
- Roger Hutchinson, A Waxing Moon: The Modern Gaelic Revival, Mainstream Publishing, Edinburgh, 2005. ISBN 1-84018-794-8.
