= Arfor =

Pro-Welsh language economic programme

ARFOR
- Motto: Creu Gwaith - Cefnogi'r Iaith (Welsh) transl. Creating Work - Supporting the Language
- Type of project: Economic planning; Welsh language assistance
- Location: Carmarthenshire; Ceredigion; Gwynedd; Isle of Anglesey
- Owner: Welsh Government; Plaid Cymru (support); Carmarthenshire Council; Ceredigion Council; Gwynedd Council; Isle of Anglesey Council
- Country: Wales
- Launched: 2019 (first phase); 2023 (second phase)
- Website: www.rhaglenarfor.cymru

Arfor (Welsh for 'coastal'; and stylised as ARFOR) is an economic support programme of the Welsh Government, as a joint venture with local councils, in Carmarthenshire, Ceredigion, Gwynedd and the Isle of Anglesey, specifically catered to support the Welsh language. The programme covers large parts of Y Fro Gymraeg, the Welsh-speaking heartlands, in the north-west and west of Wales, and is to support the use of Welsh in its heartlands, therefore the language overall.

The first phase was launched in 2019, following a budget agreement between the Welsh Labour government and Plaid Cymru, while the second phase was launched in 2023. The second phase forms part of the 2021 Welsh Labour–Plaid Cymru agreement.

== Background ==
The aim of the programme is to utilise entrepreneurship and economic development to support maintaining the use of Welsh in Y Fro Gymraeg – the Welsh-speaking heartlands – and therefore the health of the language overall, particularly in everyday use. The programme covers the areas and councils of Carmarthenshire, Ceredigion, Gwynedd and Isle of Anglesey, also described by the programme as the "ARFOR region". The programme is led by Gwynedd Council, while involving the three other councils. Arfor, which is a term from Welsh, translates into English as "coastal".

=== Objectives ===
The programme aimed to:

- Create opportunities for the youth and under families under 35 years old, to remain in their "indigenous communities", offering support to succeed locally through enterprise or a career to meet their aspirations.
- Create Welsh-speaking enterprising communities, supporting commercial and community enterprises that maintain or improve local wealth by utilising the advantages of the area.
- Increase gains from collaborative activities, through an improving mindset.
- Strengthen the community identity of areas with a high-density of Welsh-speakers, but supporting the use and visibility of Welsh, while also encouraging belonging and loyalty.

Funds from the programme were also organised to support specific sectors in the four counties. Support for Carmarthenshire, targeted the food and creative sectors, while two support packages "Business Start-up" and "Going for Growth" were operational in Ceredigion, to support entrepreneurship and job creation in enterprises in many sectors and while increasing the use of Welsh. In Gwynedd, projects were developed to facilitate job creation, by assisting the growth of businesses, and keeping investment local. While in Anglesey, support was offered to businesses, developing their use of Welsh, to grow enterprises, and to encourage young people to remain in Anglesey or return to it.

== History ==
In 2017, Welsh Government and Plaid Cymru agreed on a draft budget, which allocated £2 million to a secretariat and investment support of an "Arfor economic region in west Wales".

=== First phase ===
In 2019, the Welsh Government and Plaid Cymru agreed, in the most recent Senedd budget at the time, to allocate £2 million to Carmarthenshire, Ceredigion, Gwynedd and Isle of Anglesey councils to support those councils to innovate and trial ways to support the use of Welsh in their local economies, and create local jobs to support Welsh. The £2 million was shared between the four counties, with Carmarthenshire reported to have received £500,000.

The programme aimed to:

- Provide financial assistance to support businesses
- Mentor and support the youth through Llwyddo'n Lleol 2050, an innovation programme for 18-25 year olds originally from Gwynedd and Anglesey.
- Promote and share local success stories
- Assist businesses in accessing "cutting edge equipment"
- Support social enterprises that establish, develop and retain important resources in the Welsh-speaking heartlands.

The first phase offered grants such as "Business Start Up" up to £10,000 and "Going for Growth" for those up to £40,000, but businesses had to demonstrate they were innovative and positively impacting the Welsh language.

Upon its conclusion, the first phase supported 154 businesses, 238 full-time jobs created, 89 part-time jobs created, and 226 jobs "safeguarded", this included up to 80 businesses in Anglesey.

When the programme launched in 2019, some councillors of Powys County Council, expressed disappointment as to why Powys was excluded, as they argued there were also significant Welsh-speaking areas in North Powys (Montgomeryshire), and not being part of Arfor was a missed opportunity. Powys council was not involved in discussions over the forming of Arfor, which were led by Gwynedd council, and other councillors argued focus should now be made on including similar initiatives as part of the Mid Wales Growth Deal, or bidding for other existing Welsh Government funds.

In February 2021, nearing the first phase's end in March 2021, the Language Committee of Gwynedd Council, urged the Welsh Government to extend or set up another similar programme to maintain progress made. Siân Gwenllian, Plaid Cymru MS for Arfon, supported another similar project and argued a Plaid Cymru Government following the 2021 Senedd election, would prioritise a programme.

=== Second phase ===
On 10 October 2022, the Welsh Government and its partner Plaid Cymru, announced an addition £11 million would be provided to fund a second phase of the programme until March 2025. The funding will be available in the same four "Welsh language stronghold" counties in north-west and west Wales as the first programme.

In August 2023, the Welsh Government and its partner Plaid Cymru launched the second ARFOR programme, as part of the 2021 Welsh Labour–Plaid Cymru agreement. The launch took place at the 2023 Llŷn ac Eifionydd National Eisteddfod on 9 August, and followed the first ARFOR programme launched in 2019. It was revealed by Minister for the Economy, Vaughan Gething and Plaid Cymru Designated Member Cefin Campbell.

Five schemes were announced to be supported by the programme at launch:

- Llwyddo'n Lleol 2050 – Youth, and families under 35, local job opportunity and experiences programme to encourage those to stay or return to the ARFON areas. Partnering with Menter Môn.
- Cymunedau Mentrus – Support fund to enterprises developing community services/projects to develop the local economy and the visibility of Welsh.
- Cronfa Her – Support package for innovative ideas to tackle local and regional challenges. Partnering with Menter Môn.
- Arfon programme "Monitoring, Evaluation and Learning" by Wavehill to analyse the benefit of the programme
- Bwrlwm ARFOR – How businesses use Welsh and its benefits.

== Additional proposals ==
In 2021, Plaid Cymru proposed an integrated "tourism region" be created under the same name Arfor, as another way to keep the youth in the Welsh-speaking western coastal areas of Wales. Plaid's proposal argued for the region to span along the western coast of Wales, from Anglesey to Pembrokeshire.

== Funds ==
The programme offers a "Arfor Challenge Fund" to find solutions that can strengthen the connection between the Welsh language and the economy, with a funding preference for schemes that demonstrates Welsh can boost the economy, provided new employment opportunities, create a brand or attraction for businesses, and increase pride and the feeling of belonging. The fund forms a key part in the Welsh Government's Cymraeg 2050 strategy for 1 million Welsh speakers by 2050.

It also offers the "Arfor Programme Support Fund", targeting enterprises that preserve and increase wealth in the Welsh-speaking heartlands. This fund is administered by the county councils. The Welsh Language Commissioner would undertake language assessments for applicants for this fund and offer a recognition of Cynnig Cymraeg (The Welsh Offer).

== See also ==
- History of the Welsh language
