= Tynged yr Iaith =

1962 Welsh-language radio lecture

Tynged yr Iaith (Welsh for 'The Fate of the Language'; Welsh pronunciation: [ˈtəŋɛd ər ˈjaiθ]) was a radio lecture delivered in Welsh by Saunders Lewis on 13 February 1962. Reaction to it brought about a major change in the politics of Wales. Historian John Davies has said that the lecture was "the catalyst" for the formation of Cymdeithas yr Iaith Gymraeg (the Welsh Language Society), and the start of a period of direct-action agitation to enhance the status of the Welsh language. Its direct effect on the formation of Cymdeithas yr Iaith Gymraeg is described in a history of that society. It has been said that "of all the memorable phrases coined in the twentieth century none has greater resonance for the Welsh speaker than Tynged yr Iaith . . . which still haunts or inspires champions of the native tongue on the cusp of the new millennium". It had the unintended effect of establishing language agitation as a movement separate from the mainstream of nationalist politics. The burgeoning effects from the initial stimulus of Tynged yr Iaith were listed by Gwyn Williams:

- Formation of Cymdeithas yr Iaith Gymraeg
- Direct action against offices, roadsigns, TV masts: sit-ins and demonstrations
- Drive to create Welsh-language schools
- Positive discrimination in favour of Welsh
- Use of the Israeli model to encourage take-up of the language by adults
- Secretary of State for Wales 1964
- Welsh Language Act 1967
- Creation of S4C
- Mushrooming of Welsh language publishing, film production, pop and rock, youth and urban music.

== Text ==
Tynged yr Iaith was broadcast as the BBC Welsh Region's annual "Radio Lecture" for 1962. The lecture became available as an LP recording (hear clip ), and as a pamphlet, and is available in an English translation by G. Aled Williams. The lecture was delivered during the period between the taking of the census in 1961 and the publication of the results on the use of Welsh. Lewis anticipated that the figures when published would "shock and disappoint", and that Welsh would "end as a living language, should the present trend continue, about the beginning of the twenty-first century".

The lecture proceeded with a historical analysis of the status of the Welsh language since the Act of Union of 1535 mandated the use of English for the purposes of law and administration in Wales. Lewis maintained that the official government attitude was to desire the eradication of Welsh, and that Welsh opposition to this, if it existed, was largely unheard. He quotes at length from the Reports of the Commissioners of Inquiry into the state of education in Wales, known as the Blue Books, published in 1847, which criticised the influence both of the language and of Nonconformism on the life of Wales. He quotes specifically Commissioner R. W. Lingen's opinion that Welsh monoglots migrating from the countryside to the coalfields were prevented by their language from making any social advance. Lewis referred to this opinion as accurate and perceptive. He said that the industrial areas "did not contribute anything new either to Welsh social life or to the literature of the eisteddfodau", and that Welsh Nonconformity united town and country but "at the same time kept them standing still".

Lewis said that the anger and wrath provoked by the Blue Books resulted in no action, and that "the whole of Wales, and Welsh Nonconformity in particular, adopted all the policy and main recommendations of the baleful report". The few proponents of language revival were at the time regarded as eccentric. Lewis opined that during the period of "awakening" in 1860–1890, it might have been possible to establish the use of Welsh in education and administration throughout Wales, but that in 1962 this was not possible.

Addressing the current situation, Lewis pointed out that central government no longer considered the language a threat. In fact, it could afford to promote bilingualism in Wales. Lewis saw this as merely consigning Welsh to a "respectable and peaceful death and a burial without mourning". "If Wales seriously demanded to have Welsh as an official language on a par with English", he said, "the opposition—harsh, vindictive and violent—would come from Wales". He discusses the ineffectual opposition to the drowning of the culturally significant Tryweryn valley, saying that government had "taken the measure of the feebleness of Welsh Wales" and "need not concern itself about it any more". It could "leave that to the Welsh local authorities".

This led him to discuss the celebrated case of Trefor and Eileen Beasley of Llangennech who, between 1952 and 1960, refused to pay their local taxes unless the tax demands were in Welsh. The local authority (Llanelli Rural District) was 84% Welsh-speaking in 1951, and Lewis pointed out that all the Rural District's councillors and officials were Welsh speakers. At the end of the eight-year battle, during which the Beasleys three times had their furniture taken by bailiffs, bilingual tax demands were finally issued.^{[usurped]}

Lewis took the Beasley case as a model for future action, but significantly added "this cannot be done reasonably except in those districts where Welsh-speakers are a substantial proportion of the population". He proposed to make it impossible for the business of local and central government to continue without using Welsh. "It is a policy for a movement", he said, "in the areas where Welsh is a spoken language in daily use". It would be "nothing less than a revolution".

== After-effects ==
Gwyn Alf Williams said there were contrary effects. There was enthusiastic uptake of the cause of the language in the middle class, both English- and Welsh-speaking. But he saw the across-the-board implementation of language policies as causing the increasingly English-speaking industrial working-class (contemptuously dismissed by Lewis) to feel disenfranchised and excluded. He went on to blame this reaction for the "No" vote in the 1979 Welsh devolution referendum, in which the vote split very much on language lines.

In 1976, Clive Betts pointed out that the language movement was dissipating its efforts by ignoring Lewis's insistence that action should be restricted to Welsh-speaking areas—to the Bro Gymraeg, and called for a restricted Quebec-style policy in the Bro, as Lewis had suggested.
