= Robat Arwyn =

Welsh composer

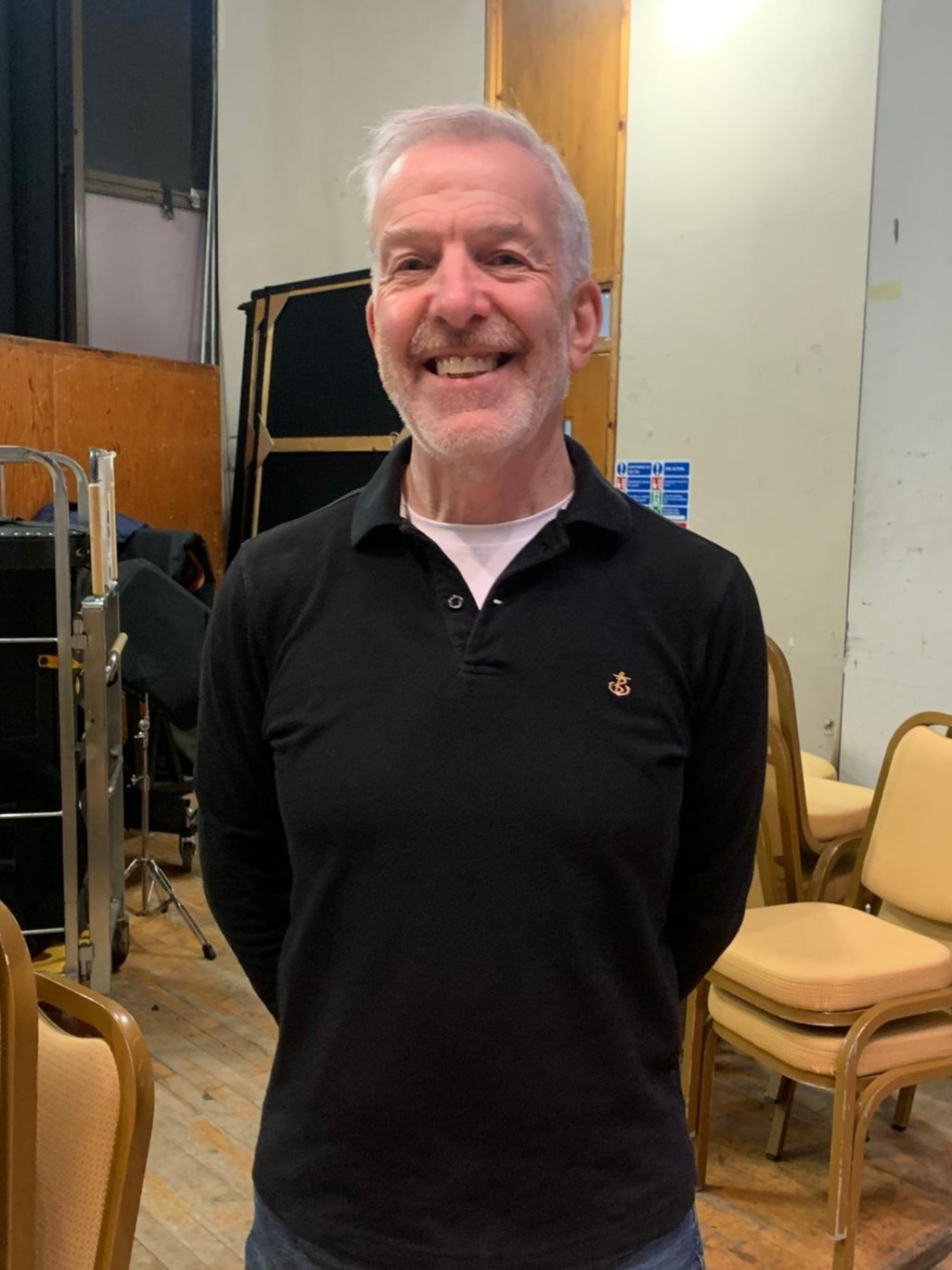
- Robat Arwyn in 2025
- Born: November 1959 (age 66)
- Occupation: Composer
- Website: www.robatarwyn.co.uk

Robat Arwyn (born November 1959) is a musical composer from Ruthin, North Wales, best known for his many Welsh-language songs. His notable compositions include the songs "Anfonaf Angel" and "Benedictus".

Arwyn was born in Talysarn, in the Nantlle valley, under the name Robert Arwyn Jones, and studied Music at Cardiff University before qualifying as a librarian at College of Librarianship in Wales at Aberystwyth. He went on to be chief librarian at Denbighshire Libraries for 20 years. Arwyn's rock opera, Ceidwad y Gannwyll, with libretto by Robin Llwyd ab Owain, was performed at the National Eisteddfod at Rhyl in 1985.

His composition, "Atgof o'r Sêr" (2001), was commissioned for the Denbighshire National Eisteddfod, where it was performed by Bryn Terfel, Fflur Wyn and Côr Rhuthun. "Anfonaf Angel", which he wrote in 2008 with Hywel Gwynfryn, has since been recorded by many artists, including Ffion Hâf, Trio, Elgan Llyr Thomas, Rhys Meirion, Piantel and the London Welsh Male Voice Choir. It was recorded in 2011 by Bryn Terfel in order to raise funds for the Welsh Air Ambulance Service.
