= Eileen Beasley =

Welsh-language activist (1921–2012)

- Born: Catherine Eileen James; 4 April 1921; Henllan Amgoed, Carmarthenshire, Wales
- Died: 12 August 2012 (aged 91); Henllan Amgoed, Carmarthenshire, Wales
- Spouse: Trefor Beasley (m. 1951; died 1994)

Eileen Beasley (4 April 1921 – 12 August 2012) was a Welsh teacher who, along with her husband Trefor, conducted a campaign of civil disobedience in the 1950s against the Rural District Council of Llanelli in a demand for council rate bills in the Welsh language. Her stand has led Welsh language campaigners to describe her as the "mother of direct action" and her protest helped to lead to the creation of Cymdeithas yr Iaith Gymraeg.

== Early life ==
Catherine Eileen James was born in 1921. She was one of three children, Llew, Eileen and John. She attended University College Cardiff and became a teacher. She met Trefor Beasley at Plaid Cymru gatherings and they were married on 31 July 1951. The couple moved to Llangennech near Llanelli in 1952.

== Welsh language campaign ==
Eileen and her husband Trefor became leading campaigners in the right to use Welsh in the 1950s, as at that time the Welsh language had no official status in Wales: no forms by public bodies were issued in the Welsh language and there were few bilingual road signs. The Beasleys refused to pay their tax bills until they were written in Welsh, as at the time they were written only in English. This refusal led to the couple being taken to court 16 times over the course of eight years, along with many personal belongings being taken by bailiffs. In the 1960s Trefor took part in the campaign to get Welsh language road tax discs, and spent a week in prison. After numerous court appearances the couple won their battle in 1960, at which point Llanelli (then officially “Llanelly”) Rural District Council agreed to print tax bills bilingually in Welsh and English. Eileen was elected as local councillor in 1958 for Plaid Cymru on Llanelli Rural District Council. Eileen Beasley is known as the "mother of direct action" in Wales and the "Rosa Parks of Wales". In April 2015 Llanelli Community Heritage unveiled a commemorative Blue Plaque at the Beasley Family home in Llangennech.

== Creation of Cymdeithas yr Iaith Gymraeg ==
In 1962 Saunders Lewis, a prominent Welsh nationalist and a founder of Plaid Cymru, gave a radio speech entitled Tynged yr iaith (The Fate of the Language) in which he predicted the extinction of the Welsh language unless action was taken. This speech led to the creation of Cymdeithas yr Iaith Gymraeg (the Welsh Language Society). During this speech he directly praised the actions of Trefor and Eileen Beasley for their campaign for Welsh language tax bills.

May I call your attention to the story of Mr. and Mrs. Trefor Beasley? Mr. Beasley is a coal-miner. In April 1952 he and his wife bought a cottage in Llangennech near Llanelli, a district where nine out of every ten of the population are Welsh-speaking. All the councillors on the rural council which controls Llangennech are Welsh-speaking: so too are the council officials. Therefore when a note demanding the local rates arrived from ‘The Rural District Council of Llanelly' Mrs. Beasley wrote to ask for it in Welsh. It was refused. She refused to pay the rates until she got it. She and Mr. Beasley were summoned more than a dozen times to appear before the magistrates' court. Mr. and Mrs. Beasley insisted that the court proceedings should be in Welsh. Three times did the bailiffs carry off furniture from their home, the furniture being worth much more than the rates which were demanded. This went on for eight years. In 1960 Mr. and Mrs. Beasley received a bilingual note demanding the local rates from (Cyngor Dosbarth Gwledig Llanelli, the Welsh on the bill being just as good as its English. It is not my right to say what was the financial cost of all this to Mr. and Mrs. Beasley. Friends, including solicitors and barristers, were very loyal. Their trouble became the subject of the country's attention, and the newspapers and radio and television plagued them continually. The court cases were interesting and important. For example, the rating officer's reply to Mr. Wynne Samuel: 'The Council is not under any obligation to print rate demand notes in any language except English.'

— Saunders Lewis, "Tynged yr iaith"

Lewis took the Beasley case as a model for future action, but significantly added "this cannot be done reasonably except in those districts where Welsh-speakers are a substantial proportion of the population". He proposed to make it impossible for the business of local and central government to continue without using Welsh". "It is a policy for a movement", he said, "in the areas where Welsh is a spoken language in daily use" it would be "nothing less than a revolution".

== Death ==
Eileen Beasley died on 12 August 2012 of pancreatic cancer. Language campaigners have said that Eileen and Trefor's courage inspired a generation to take up the fight and led to crucial milestones in the protection of the Welsh language, such as the creation of S4C (Sianel Pedwar Cymru - Channel Four Wales) and bilingual road signs.

== Bibliography ==
- James, E. Wyn; Williams, Colin H. (2016). "Beasley, (Catherine) Eileen (1921–2012)". In Cannadine, David (ed.). Oxford Dictionary of National Biography. Oxford: Oxford University Press.
