= Jamie Bevan =

Welsh-language activist

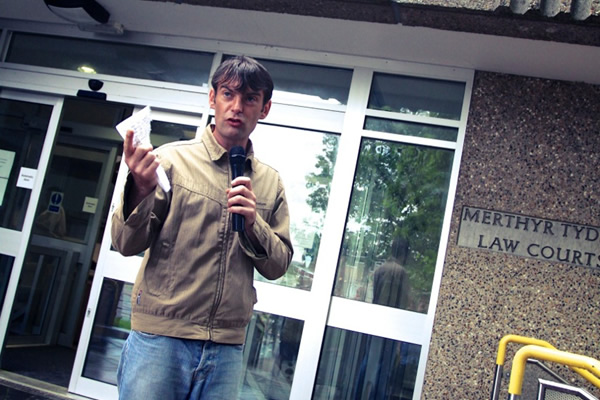
Bevan addresses the crowd before his sentence in August 2012.

Gareth Jamie Bevan is a Welsh language campaigner and a member of Cymdeithas yr Iaith Gymraeg. Bevan refused to pay fines and costs to Merthyr Tydfil Magistrate's Court for breaking into Conservative Party offices in north Cardiff the day before a visit from David Cameron in a demonstration against cuts to S4C.

Bevan was sentenced to 35 days in prison by Merthyr Tydfil magistrates in 2012. He said that he was using the case to draw attention to the lack of Welsh language correspondence from the courts.

He had complained three times about monolingual English correspondence from the courts service but later received a court summons in English only.

== Music ==
Bevan is also a Welsh folk singer-songwriter, performing solo and with bands Y Betti Galws and Jamie Bevan a’r Gweddillion. He has performed alongside Welsh language folk stalwarts Meic Stevens and Dafydd Iwan and his music has been played on BBC Radio Wales, Radio Cymru and S4C. He has performed live at the National Eisteddfod of Wales and at Welsh language, republican and other political benefit gigs, together with regular appearances at Red Poets events alongside poet Mike Jenkins and others.

== Discography ==
- Y Betti Galws - Self-titled, (2009) CD.
- Jamie Bevan a’r Gweddillion - Torri'r Cerffiw, (2011) CD
- Jamie Bevan a’r Gweddillion - Ei Fab aeth o'i Flaen (Sain), (2012) Download.
- Jamie Bevan a’r Gweddillion - Bach Yn Ryff, (2013) CD.
