= Evan Davies (educationalist) =

Welsh educationalist (1826–1872)

Evan Davies (26 June 1826 – 22 August 1872) was a Welsh educationalist. He was born in the Llanycrwys area of Carmarthenshire, and attended school at Llansawel, where he was taught by William Davies (1805–1859). He later studied in Alfred Day's school, Bristol, and in Glasgow, on a scholarship, from where he graduated and obtained his M.A.; in 1852 he was awarded an LL.D. For a time he taught at the new Voluntaryist college (set up without government assistance) for teachers in Brecon (1846), where after a period of training, he was appointed principal. It later became "Swansea Training College", for women teachers, and Davies moved there with the institution, remaining for the rest of his life in Swansea. Despite the demise of the Voluntaryist movement and the resulting shortage of funds, Davies continued to run the institution as a private venture until 1867 when he passed it on to Dan Isaac Davies, instead moving to a career in law, eventually becoming a partner in a legal firm. While in Swansea, he became choirmaster at the New Congregational Church, until forced to abandon the role by ill-health.
