= 1750 in Great Britain =

Events from the year 1750 in Great Britain.

== Incumbents ==
- Monarch – George II
- Prime Minister – Henry Pelham (Whig)

== Events ==
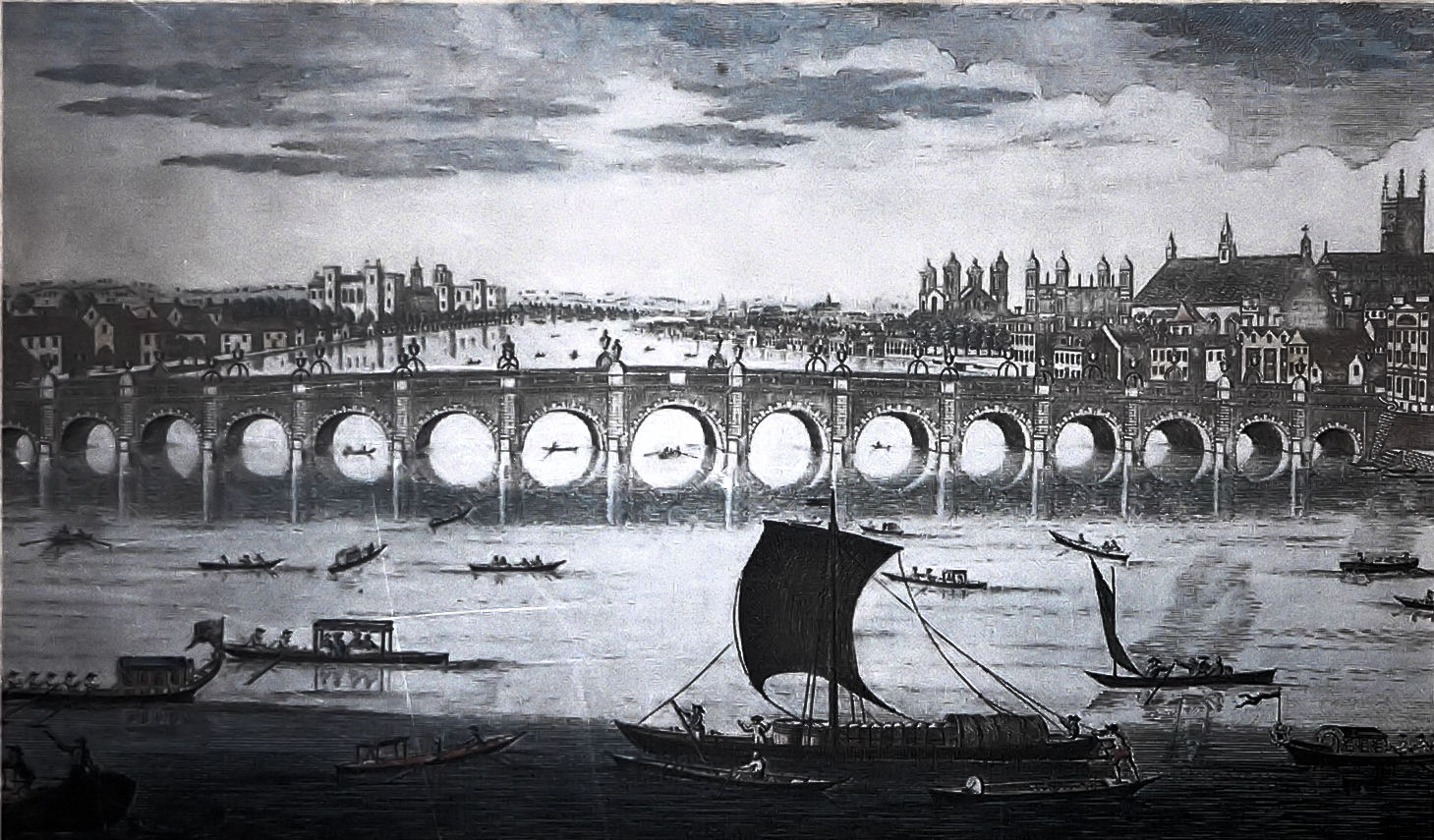
Westminster Bridge

- 17 January – John Canton reads a paper in the presence of the Royal Society of London on a method of making artificial magnets.
- 8 February – an earthquake is felt in London.
- 8 March – a second more powerful earthquake is felt in London.
- 20 March – Samuel Johnson begins publication of the periodical The Rambler.
- 11 April – Jack Slack (a butcher of Norwich) defeats Jack Broughton to become bare-knuckle boxing Champion of England
- 24 June – Iron Act, passed by Parliament, comes into effect, restricting manufacture of iron products in the American colonies.
- 5 October – Treaty of Madrid, a commercial treaty with Spain, is signed.
- 18 November – Westminster Bridge is officially opened for the general public to use, the only fixed crossing of the River Thames between London Bridge and Putney.

=== Undated ===
- Establishment of the Jockey Club and the Pytchley Hunt.
- Thomas Gainsborough's painting Mr and Mrs Andrews.

== Births ==
- 24 January – Helen Gloag, Scottish-born slave Empress of Morocco (died 1790)
- 18 February – David Bogue, nonconformist leader (died 1825)
- April – Joanna Southcott, religious fanatic (died 1814)
- 2 May – John André, British Army officer of the American Revolutionary War (died 1780)
- 6 June – William Morgan, actuary (died 1833)
- 13 June – James Burney, admiral (died 1821)
- 26 September – Cuthbert Collingwood, 1st Baron Collingwood, admiral (died 1810)

== Deaths ==
- 7 February – Algernon Seymour, 7th Duke of Somerset, aristocrat (born 1684)
- 8 February – Aaron Hill, dramatist (born 1685)
- 29 March – James Jurin, physician and mathematician (born 1684)
- 7 April – George Byng, 3rd Viscount Torrington, general (born 1701)
- 28 July – Conyers Middleton, religious controversialist and classical scholar (born 1683)
- 8 August – Charles Lennox, 2nd Duke of Richmond, aristocrat, philanthropist and cricket patron (born 1701)
- 3 October – 'Captain' James MacLaine (or Maclean), gentleman highwayman (born 1724) (hanged at Tyburn)
- 13 December – Philemon Ewer, shipbuilder (born 1702)

== See also ==
- 1750 in Wales
