= Ffransis G. Payne =

Welsh author, folkorist and curator

Ffransis G. Payne (11 October 1900 – 22 April 1992) was a Welsh folklorist, museum curator and author.

He was born as Francis George Payne in Kington, Herefordshire, to a father from Cardiff and a mother from Shropshire. He died in Llandrindod Wells.

In 1933 he was the Welsh cataloguer in the library of the University College of Wales, Swansea and then in 1936 became an assistant in the new Folk Culture section at the National Museum of Wales.

== Publications ==
- Yr Aradr Gymreig (1954)
- Welsh Peasant Costume (1964)
- Cwysau (1980)
