= Gaelic road signs in Scotland =

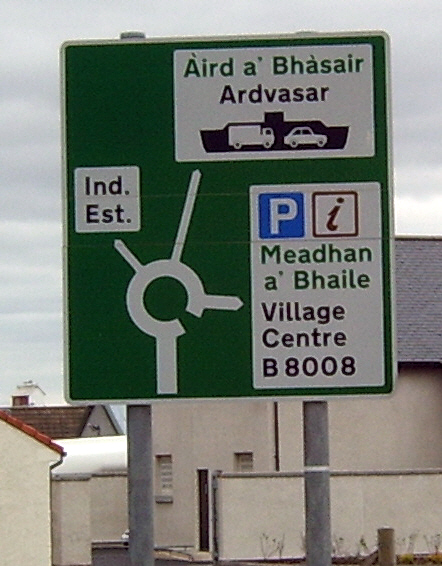
Roadsign in Mallaig

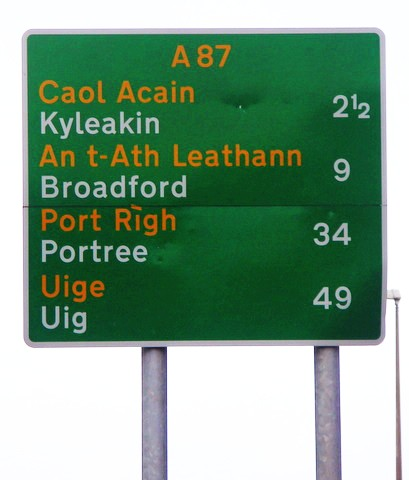
Primary route sign outside Kyle of Lochalsh

In the Gaelic-speaking parts of Scotland, the use of the Gaelic language on road signs instead of, or more often alongside, English is now common, but has been a controversial issue.

== History ==
In the 18th and 19th centuries, map makers recorded Gaelic placenames in Anglicised versions. One would expect important towns like Stornoway or Portree to have slightly different names in different languages, but it is unusual for this to be the case with small hamlets or minor topographical features, and the Anglicisation of placenames was resented by educated Gaels.

In the 20th century, Inverness County Council, which until the latter part of the century was known for its antipathy towards the Gaelic language, was responsible for erecting road signs throughout the Highlands. The council insisted that these be entirely in English and follow the spellings on the Ordnance Survey maps. Gaelic language organisations had limited resources and thus did not see opposition to this policy as a priority. In September 1970 Aird District Council rejected a proposal for bilingual signs.

=== Highland revival ===
In 1973, however, the issue was forced onto the public agenda as a result of the Skye road sign controversy. The council was planning to build a new road south from Portree, and needed to purchase a strip of land belonging to landowner Iain Noble. Noble offered to donate the land to the council on condition that the three signs which were to be erected on the stretch of road be bilingual, a way of registering Gaelic on the linguistic landscape. The proposal was fiercely resisted by the council, and in particular by Lord Burton, Chairman of the Roads Committee, who later the same year attempted unsuccessfully to introduce legislation in the House of Lords limiting the use of Gaelic by Scottish local authorities. However, Noble was supported by a petition signed by many prominent Skye residents, and the experience of Wales, where bilingual signposting had already been accepted, was favourable. As the issue had aroused public interest, and a compulsory purchase order might have been slow and expensive, the council negotiated a compromise: Portree and Broadford both received bilingual signposts on an "experimental" basis.

As Noble had hoped, and the council feared, this set a precedent, which was gradually followed throughout the 1980s, becoming generally accepted in the 1990s. Bilingual signposting is now the norm throughout the Western Isles (indeed for a time directional signposts there were monolingually Gaelic) and also in large parts of the mainland on local authority roads.

In 1996, Highland Council decided to make use of Gaelic-only signposts in some areas.

In 2001, the Scottish Government announced plans to erect bilingual signage along many of the trunk roads in the Scottish Highlands, in addition to those already erected on local-authority-maintained roads. This project is now all but completed, although importantly it excludes the main A9 trunk road and also the A96 between Inverness and Aberdeen. It has however included the A82 westerly trunk route from Inverness to Glasgow. Since the government has a strict policy of only erecting bilingual roadsigns when new signs in any case had to be erected, the costs to the public purse of making these bilingual has been negligible.

In 2008, eight Caithness councillors were unsuccessful in their attempt to block Highland-wide support for bilingual English/Gaelic signage.

In March 2009, Highland Council's Gaelic committee wrote to the Transport Minister, Stewart Stevenson, asking for the use of Gaelic signage to be extended on trunk roads. The minister responded by saying that he awaited a review that had been commissioned, as he thought there was some anecdotal evidence of motorists encountering some difficulties with bilingual signage.

=== Motorist research ===
A report was published in 2012 by Transport Scotland stating that bilingual signs were not a danger to motorists. It was noted that the signs required slightly more attention on the part of motorists but that it did not pose any real risk. According to the study there has been no detectable change in accident rates.

"The report suggests that while there is reasonable evidence to infer bilingual signs increase the demand of the driving task, drivers appear able to absorb this extra demand, or negate it by slowing down, which ultimately results in no detectable change in accident rates."

— Consultant, TRL,

Research conducted by Leeds University indicates that multi-lingual signs consisting of four or more lines of text can cause drivers to brake to allow them time to process the additional information. Following drivers may not react appropriately to the change in speed of the leading vehicle. The study recommends the use of "separation techniques", such as using a different colour of font for each language, which eliminates the problem. Bilingual road signs in Scotland typically use white letters for English and green (or yellow on primary routes) for Gaelic.

== See also ==
- Ceartas
- List of Scottish Gaelic place names
