= Evan Davies (Myfyr Morganwg) =

Welsh bard, druid and antiquarian

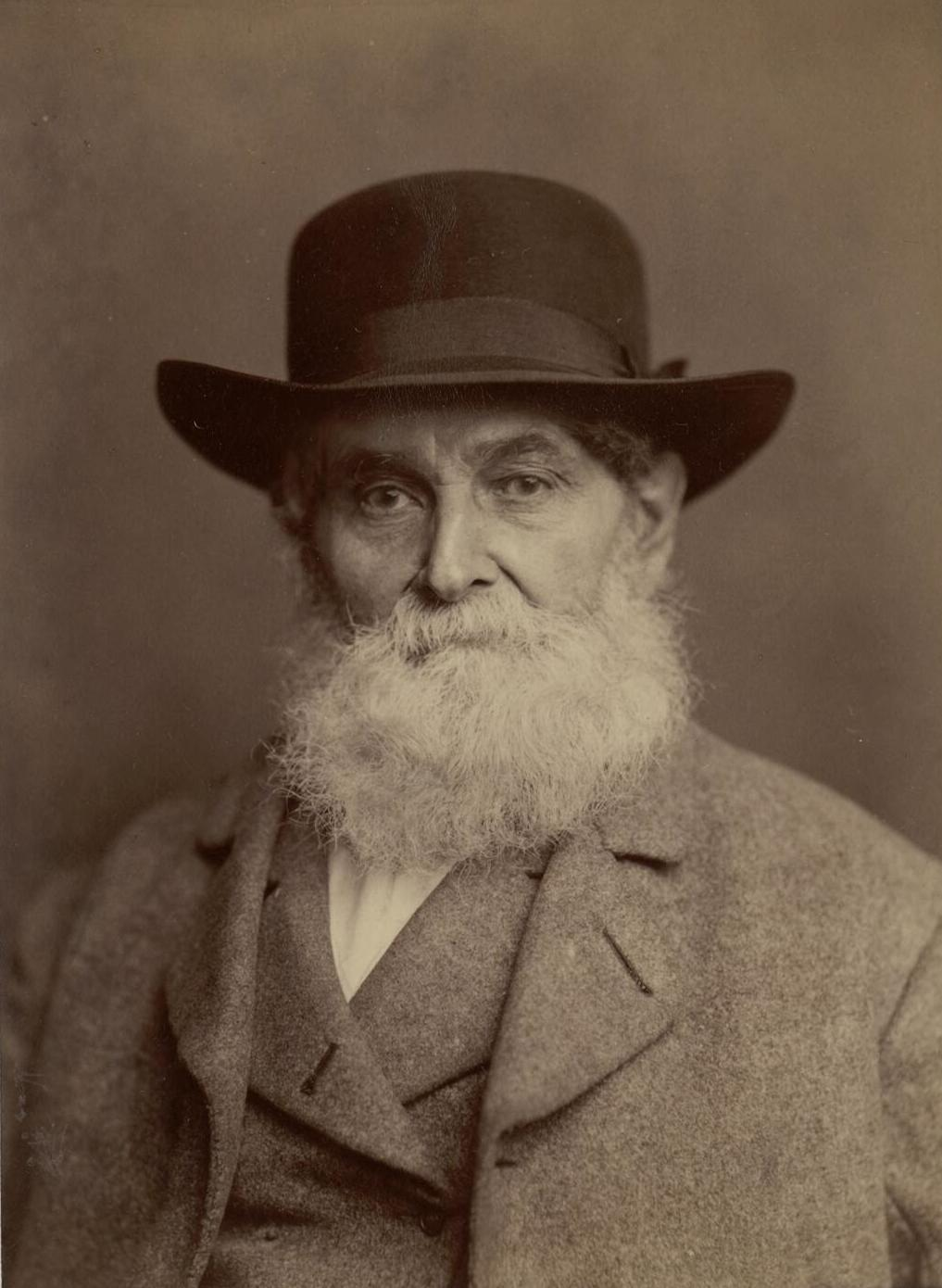
- Born: 1801
- Died: 1888 (aged 86–87)

Evan Davies (6 January 1801 – 23 February 1888), also known by his bardic name Myfyr Morganwg was a Welsh bard, druid and antiquarian.

Born in Pencoed, Glamorganshire, it is thought that Davies received no formal education; instead he spent his early years studying Welsh Bardic Rules and teaching himself mathematics, among other subjects. As a young man he preached in his local chapels and became a watchmaker by trade. In 1842 he rose to prominence when he and John Jones of Llangollen began openly debating the subject of temperance at a meeting in Llantrisant, Glamorganshire. Before this, he would preach in chapels near to his home. It was around 1844–45 that Davies moved to Pontypridd, where he first took on the name 'Myfyr Morganwg'.

He became very interested by the revival of interest in Druidism which had swept the local area. He read heavily on the subject and concluded that Christianity was merely Druidism in a Jewish garb. Following the death of Taliesin Williams in 1847, Davies proclaimed himself archdruid, and from about 1853 he began to hold religious and druidical services near the Rocking Stone at Pontypridd. For about 25 years the practice of holding meetings at the hour of equinoxes and solstices became a Glamorgan tradition, and Davies published a number of books on druidism. Much of his Neo druidic writings were nothing more than a continuation of the 18th-century revival and thus are built largely around writings produced in the 18th century and after by second-hand sources and theorists. Nevertheless, Davies was considered by some of his contemporaries as an expert in the field.
