= Owain Owain =

Welsh novelist and poet (1929–1993)

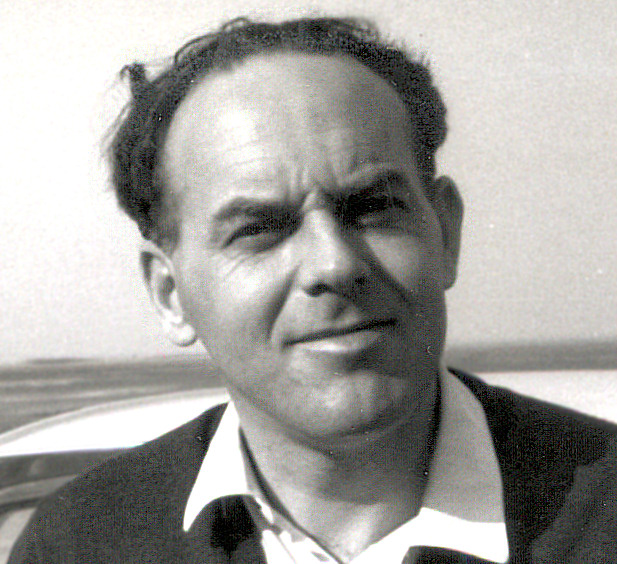
- Owain in 1966
- Born: 11 December 1929 Pwllheli, Wales
- Died: 19 December 1993 (aged 64) Pwllheli, Wales
- Notable awards: Wales Book of the Year (1977)
- Spouses: Eira
- Children: Robin Llwyd ab Owain

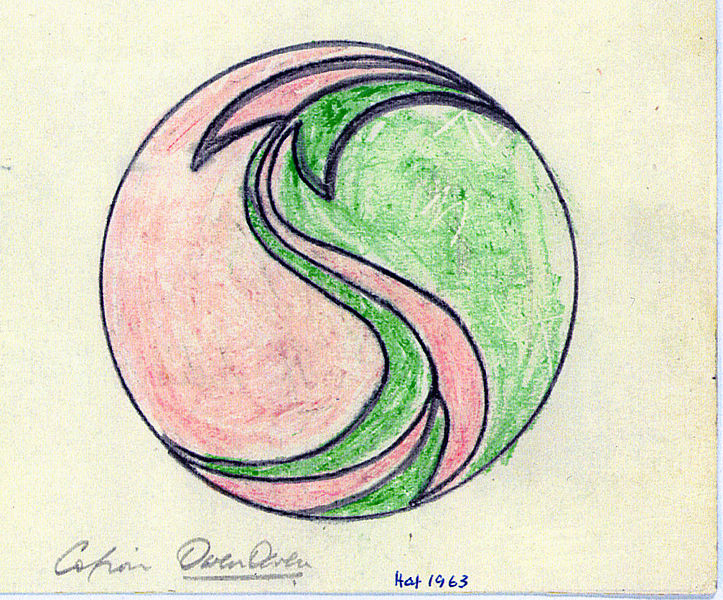
Original "dragon's tongue" created by Owain Owain

Owain Owain (11 December 1929 – 19 December 1993) was a Welsh novelist, short-story writer and poet. He also founded Tafod y Ddraig (The Dragon's Tongue), which became the Welsh Language Society's main voice from its inception in the 1960s to the present day.

Owain was born in Pwllheli, and attended Ysgol Tŷ Tan Domen in Bala. Having worked as a nuclear scientist in Windscale for a few years, he returned home to Wales in 1956 with his wife Eira, and settled down in Bangor to raise a family of four children, one of whom is Robin Llwyd ab Owain. He was a member of Mensa International, and created new protests for the Welsh Language Society as the secretary of the first branch, located at Bangor. Owain also sketched the society's logo (a red dragon's tongue) which continues to be their badge and logo. This early sketch can be seen at the National Library of Wales, Aberystwyth and on his official website (see below). Leading politician Dafydd Iwan says on his website, "He inspired my generation and laid down strong foundations on which the Welsh Language Society was built."

His science fiction book entitled Y Dydd Olaf (The Last Day) was described by the Welsh literary critic Pennar Davies in the book's preface: "Nothing like this book has been seen before either in our language or in any other language. We should rejoice that such brilliance exists in Welsh writing."
