= Tafod y Ddraig =

Monthly magazine

Tafod y Ddraig (the Dragon's Tongue), the society logo

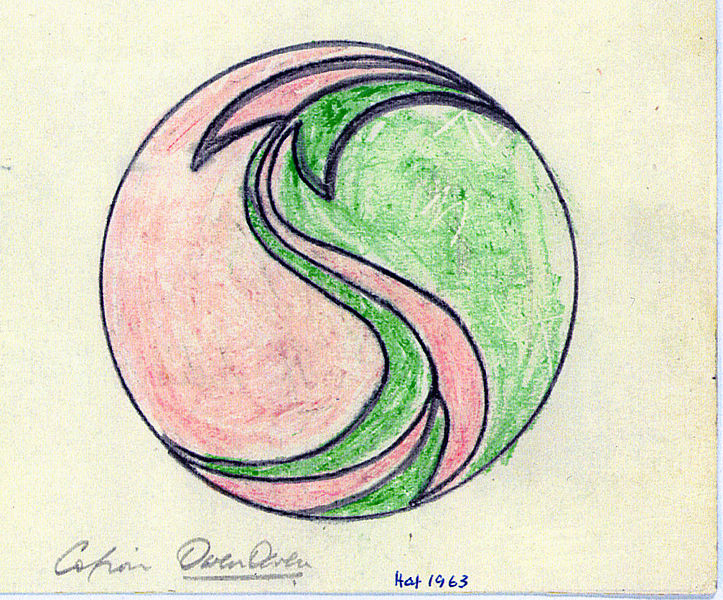
The original logo which Owain Owain created in the summer of 1963 and which was the basis for the Society's logo.

Tafod y Ddraig (which translates as "The Dragon's Tongue", Welsh pronunciation: [ˈtavɔd ə ˈðraɪɡ]), or Tafod, is a monthly Welsh language magazine dedicated to the promotion and preservation of the Welsh language. This magazine was the only voice of Cymdeithas yr Iaith Gymraeg (the Welsh Language Society) from its foundation in October 1963 by Owain Owain. It is still published by the Society under the title Tafod ("Tongue"), approximately quarterly to coincide with events such as the National Eisteddfod.

According to Gwilym Tudur, Owain Owain (formerly known as Owen Owen) "united the society through his magazine in the 1960s like a movement unto himself!". Tafod y Ddraig was published before the society became known: indeed, the dragon's tongue logo (also created by Owain) was sketched before the society had a constitution. It can be seen today at the National Library of Wales.
