= Gàidhealtachd =

Gaelic-speaking part of Scotland

Geographic distribution of Gaelic speakers in Scotland (2011)

The Gàidhealtachd (Scottish Gaelic pronunciation: [ˈkɛːəl̪ˠt̪əxk]; English: Gaeldom) usually refers to the Highlands and Islands of Scotland and especially the Scottish Gaelic-speaking culture of the area. The similar Irish language word Gaeltacht refers, however, solely to Irish-speaking areas.

The term is also used to apply to areas of Nova Scotia and Glengarry County, Ontario where the distinctive Canadian dialects of Scottish Gaelic were or are still spoken.

"The Gàidhealtachd" is not interchangeable with "Scottish Highlands" as it refers to the language and not to the geography. Also, many parts of the Highlands no longer have substantial Gaelic-speaking populations, and some parts of what is now thought of as the Highlands have long been Scots-speaking or English-speaking areas such as Cromarty, Grantown-on-Spey, etc. Conversely, several Gaelic-speaking communities lie outside the Highland, Argyll and Bute and Outer Hebrides council areas, for example the Isle of Arran and parts of Perth and Kinross, not to mention Nova Scotia, North Carolina, and other areas to which there was significant migration. Gàidhealtachd also increasingly refers to any region where Scottish Gaelic is spoken as a first language by much of the population. However, Gàidhealtachd is sometimes used to refer to the Scottish Highlands, by organisations such as Highlands and Islands Enterprise (Iomairt na Gàidhealtachd 's nan Eilean) and the Highland Council (Comhairle na Gàidhealtachd).

Galldachd ('Gall-dom', Gall referring to a non-Gael) is often used for the Lowlands, although it is also notable that the Hebrides are known as Innse Gall due to the historical presence of Norsemen.

== History ==
Until a few centuries ago, the Gàidhealtachd would have included much of modern-day Scotland north of the Firth of Forth and Galloway (up until the 18th century, and maybe later), excepting the Northern Isles, as evidenced by the prevalence of Gaelic-derived place names throughout most of Scotland and contemporary accounts. These include Dundee from the Gaelic Dùn Deagh, Inverness from Inbhir Nis, Argyll from Earra-Ghàidheal, Galloway from Gall-Ghaidhealaibh, and possibly Stirling from Sruighlea (though the etymology is uncertain). Gaelic speakers from what would be considered traditionally English-speaking/non-Gaelic regions today included George Buchanan (from Stirlingshire), Robert the Bruce (from Galloway), and Margaret McMurray (from Ayrshire).

For historical reasons, including the influence of a Scots-speaking court in Edinburgh and the plantation of merchant burghs in much of the south and east, the Gàidhealtachd has been reduced massively to the present region of the Outer Hebrides, the Northwest Highlands, Skye and Loch Alsh, and Argyll and Bute, with small Gaelic populations existing in Glasgow and Edinburgh. The Highland Clearances of the 18th and 19th centuries also contributed to the decline of the language, as they reduced the population of the Scottish Highlands, which were predominantly Gaelic-speaking at the time.

== Canadian Gàidhealtachd ==
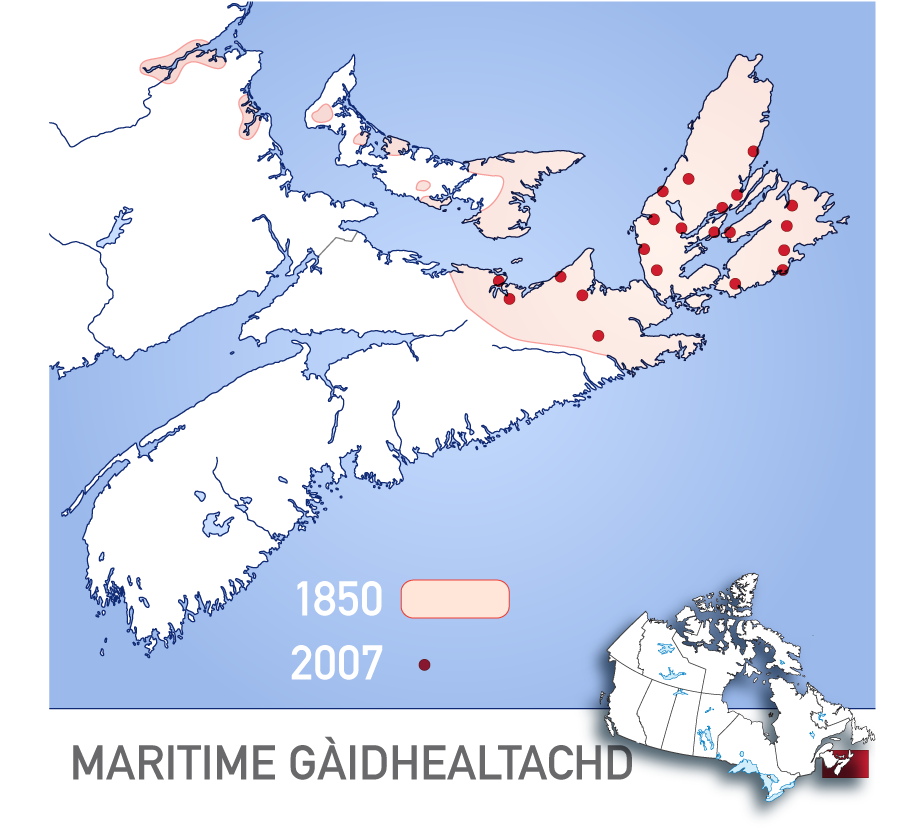
The Gaelic-speaking areas of Maritime Canada.

In Canada, at one time Scottish Gaelic was the third most spoken language after English and French; in 1901, there were 50,000 speakers in Nova Scotia alone.

It has survived as a minority language among communities descended from Scottish immigrants in parts of Nova Scotia (especially Cape Breton Island), Glengarry County in present-day Ontario, Prince Edward Island, and Newfoundland and Labrador.) The Codroy Valley on the island of Newfoundland had a Gaelic-speaking minority until the 1960s.

== See also ==
- Scotia
- Gaelic road signs in Scotland
- Scottish Gaelic-medium education
- Y Fro Gymraeg Welsh-speaking regions in Wales.
