= Gwenno Teifi =

Welsh-language activist (born 1987)

Gwenno Teifi (full name Gwenno Teifi Ffransis, born 1987) is a Welsh language activist from Llanfihangel-ar-Arth, Wales. In February 2006 she became the first member of Cymdeithas yr Iaith Gymraeg (The Welsh Language Society) to serve a jail sentence for a language protest in 11 years.

== Radio Carmarthenshire protest and jailing ==
Gwenno was arrested along with four other language protestors on 24 July 2004 at the studios of Radio Carmarthenshire in Narberth She was jailed after refusing to pay the £200 compensation to Radio Carmarthenshire ordered by Carmarthen Magistrates Court. She was sentenced to five days beginning 13 February 2006 at Eastwood Park Prison in Gloucestershire but released after three days for good behaviour.

== Brantano's protest and second jailing ==
She was jailed a second time in July 2007 for refusing to pay a fine in connection with a language protest at Brantano's shoe store in Aberystwyth in October 2006.

== Morrisons supermarket protest and arrest ==
Gwenno was arrested again in connection with a language protest at Morrisons supermarket in Bangor on 27 January 2007. She was not jailed.

== Education ==
Gwenno has a degree in Welsh and International Politics from Aberystwyth University.

== Post-graduation ==
Gwenno worked in a Christian Mission House in Amsterdam, and is currently a Youth Officer in the Presbyterian Church of Wales.

== Family background ==
Her father is long-time Welsh language activist Ffred Ffransis, currently the education spokesperson for Cymdeithas yr Iaith Gymraeg, and her mother is another well-known activist, Meinir Ffransis (nee Evans). Thus Gwenno's grandfather was Gwynfor Evans, the first member of Plaid Cymru elected to Parliament.
