= Evan Davies (Calvinistic Methodist minister) =

Welsh Calvinistic Methodist minister

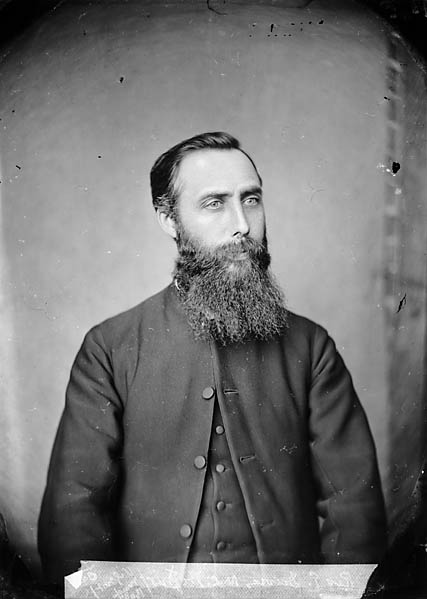
Rev. Evan Davies of Trefriw, from the John Thomas Collection

Evan Davies (1842-1919) was a Welsh Calvinistic Methodist minister, and writer. He was born in Aberangell, Merionethshire. As a boy (of the age of 10) he entered employment as a farm worker, later (at 17) becoming a quarryman. He was however keen to further his education (he had always had a keen interest in history and literature), and after beginning preaching in 1865, in 1868 he moved to study at Bala College, following which, in 1873, he was ordained minister of Llangynog. He later (in 1875) moved for a period to a post at Llanarmon Dyffryn Ceiriog, followed by a move (in 1879) to Trefriw, where he remained till his death.

His written works include a number of short religious books, his biography of Joseph Thomas of Carno, a short ‘Life’ of Dafydd Dafis of Cywarch (1794 - 1861) (a 'highly original preacher'), and a selection of verse.

He died, aged 77, in 1919.
