= Robin Llwyd ab Owain =

Welsh author, poet, and Wikipedian

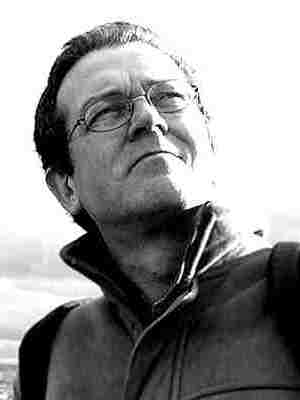
- Robin Owain in Paris in 2005
- Occupations: Author; Poet; Wikimedia UK Wales Manager
- Parent: Owain Owain
- Robin Owain's voice recorded February 2014

Robin Llwyd ab Owain is a Welsh author, poet, and Wikipedian. He won the chair at the National Eisteddfod of Wales in 1991. In 2013, he was appointed Wikimedia UK's first Wales Manager. He is the son of poet and writer Owain Owain.

== Writing ==
In 1991, Owain won the chair at the National Eisteddfod of Wales at Mold for a poem titled "Awdl Foliant Merch ein Hamserau" (The Girl of Our Times). His poems have been read on television by actor Rhys Ifans, but the poet himself has declined to be interviewed in the mass media. In December 1996 he published a volume of poems on the web under the title "Rebel ar y We" (Rebel on the Web), described by the Academi as the first Welsh language book to have been published on the web — since renamed as "Rhedeg ar Wydyr" (Running on Glass).

Owain has written for television and radio, and has also written and published over 100 songs, sometimes collaborating with his friend, singer and songwriter Rhys Meirion. Bryn Terfel has performed "Brenin y Ser" (The King of The Stars), which was written by Owain and the composer Robat Arwyn, as was "Pedair Oed", recorded by Côr Rhuthun and Rhys Meirion in 2004.

== Other work ==
Owain was a head teacher, who has worked at Ysgol Glan Morfa, Abergele and Ysgol Llangwm. In the early 1990s he served as mayor of Ruthin.

== Wikimedia ==
On 1 July 2013, Owain was appointed the first Wales Manager by Wikimedia UK and Wici Cymru, with the objective of expanding Wicipedia Cymraeg (Welsh Wikipedia). As part of this programme, the Welsh Assembly contributed financially to the training of new editors.
