= Evan Thomas Davies (cleric) =

Welsh priest

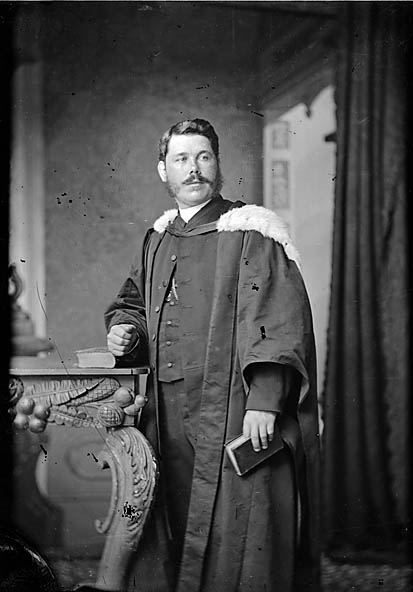
Evan Thomas Davies circa 1875 photographed by John Thomas

Evan Thomas Davies (20 June 1847 – 31 October 1927), also known by the pseudonym "Dyfrig", was a Welsh priest. After completing his education at the school in Ystrad Meurig he moved to study at St David's College, Lampeter, graduating in 1869. He then spent the next year teaching, at Greenock, before, in 1870 being ordained Deacon (by Bishop Ollivant of Llandaf), and, in 1871, ordained Priest. For a while he was appointed Curate of Llanwynno, and later of Betws, Glamorganshire. In 1875, he moved to take up an appointment at St David's Welsh Church, Brownlow Hill, Liverpool, before, in 1882, becoming vicar of Aberdyfi, and then, in 1890, of Pwllheli. In 1906 he was appointed Vicar of Llanfihangel Ysgeifiog in Anglesey, where he remained until he retired in 1913. He also served as Rural Dean of Llŷn (1891 to 1900), and as Residentiary Canon of Bangor Cathedral (from 1906).

His written works include Cydymaith y Cymro (1885), Pregethau, Erthyglau ac Areithiau (1894), and Pregethau ac Anerchiadau (1899). He co-edited the Welsh language religious journal Llusern y llan, which ran from 1881 to 1884. He was a subscriber to Gleanings from God's Acre (1903), edited by Myrddin Fardd, and spoke at the Church of England Congress in 1891.

He died in Bangor in 1927, aged 80, and was buried in Glanadda cemetery.
