= Evan Thomas Davies (musician) =

Welsh organist and composer

- Born: 1878
- Died: 1969 (aged 90–91)
- Occupations: musician conductor organist classical composer
- Parents: George Davies (father); Gwenllian Davies (mother)

Evan Thomas Davies (1878 – 1969) was a Welsh musician. His parents were George Davies (a Dowlais barber), and Gwenllian, of Dowlais. His mother's family were descendants of songwriter Richard Samuel Hughes. He received private musical tuition from organist and composer Harry Evans, and in 1900 toured the USA as a pianist and organist. From 1900 to 1903 he was organist and choirmaster at Christchurch Cyfarthfa, Merthyr Tydfil, and from 1903 to 1917 organist at Pontmorlais Chapel. He also worked as a singing teacher in Merthyr Tydfil secondary school (1904–20). He was in considerable demand as a solo organist and is said to have given over 100 recitals across Wales to mark the opening of new organs.

In 1920, Davies was appointed as the Director of Music at the University College, Bangor, the first full-time appointee to this post. When he retired in 1943, he moved to Aberdare and spent his time composing, broadcasting and adjudicating at many National Eisteddfodau and international music competitions. He was conductor at several National Eisteddfod concerts and for a time chief examiner in music for the Central Welsh Board, examiner for school and higher certificates and examiner for Glamorgan county music scholarships.

His compositions included two sets of Welsh folk dances, which were celebrated in their day. He also composed songs, part-songs, piano works and chamber music. The song 'Ynys y plant' (The Children's Isle) was the prize song of the National Eisteddfod of Wales in 1909 and became a favourite of the soprano Amy Evans. It is still performed today.

There are about 100 vocal and instrumental arrangements of folk tunes at Bangor. Davies also edited Welsh versions of Bach's St Matthew Passion, edited Welsh church hymnals and was author of articles, reviews and commentaries on Welsh music. His 1926 folk song arrangement Eos Lais (The Nightingale) has been recorded by The Tippett Quartet
