= Meinir Ffransis =

Welsh language activist

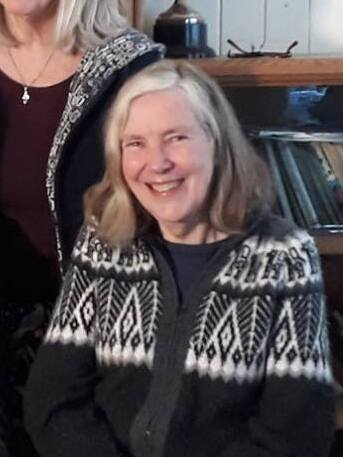
- Ffransis in 2019

Personal details
- Born: Meinir Evans; 8 April 1950 (age 76)
- Party: Plaid Cymru
- Spouse: Ffred Ffransis
- Relations: Gwynfor Evans (father); Mabon ap Gwynfor (nephew)
- Children: 7, including Gwenno Teifi

Meinir Ffransis (born 8 April 1950; née Evans) is a Welsh political activist, best known for her activities as a prominent member of Cymdeithas yr Iaith Gymraeg (The Welsh Language Society). She served jail sentences for various offences while campaigning for recognition for the Welsh language.

Meinir Ffransis is one of the three daughters and seven children of the first Plaid Cymru MP and one-time party leader, Gwynfor Evans, and his wife, Rhiannon Prys Thomas, both of whom died in 2005. Her political career began when, aged sixteen, she campaigned for her father in the 1966 Carmarthen by-election, when he took the seat from Labour. It was suggested that the loss of the seat in 1970 was partly due to his daughter's involvement in vigorous protests by the Welsh Language Society that same year.

She married Ffred Ffransis, also a keen campaigner for Cymdeithas yr Iaith Gymraeg. The couple became notorious for their frequent brushes with the law during the 1970s, with Meinir on one occasion being jailed for defacing a TV transmitter during the campaign for a Welsh-language TV channel. When her father visited her in prison, they were not allowed to speak Welsh to one another, even though they had never previously conversed with one another in any other language.

They have seven children: five daughters (Lleucu Meinir, Carys Rhian, Angharad Clwyd, Gwenno Teifi and Siriol Teifi) and two sons (Hedd Gwynfor and Ioan Teifi). In 2006, their daughter, Gwenno Teifi, was jailed for refusing to pay compensation to a local radio station, Radio Carmarthenshire, for criminal damage, becoming the first Welsh-language activist to be convicted and imprisoned in eleven years. Another daughter, Lleucu Meinir, was involved in a public protest in Grangetown, Cardiff, for refusing to pay parking fines notified to her in the English language only.

Ffransis appeared in a Welsh-language TV drama documentary about her father in 2013.
