= Dan Isaac Davies =

Welsh schoolmaster (1839–1887)

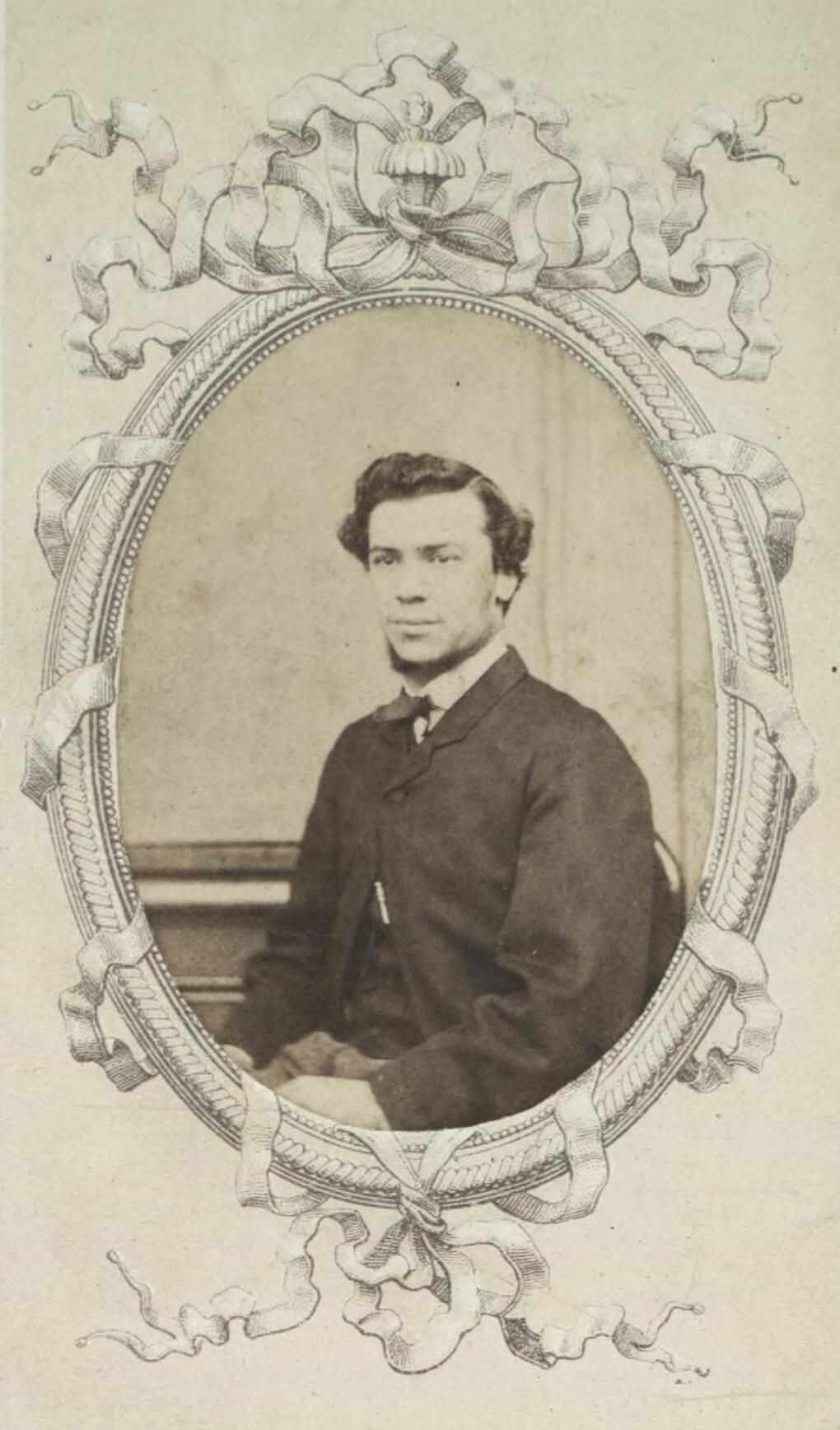
- Born: 24 January 1839; Llandovery, Wales
- Died: May 1887 (aged 48)
- Occupation: Educator

Dan Isaac Davies (24 January 1839 – 28 May 1887) was a Welsh schoolmaster, one of the first to advocate the teaching of Welsh language in schools. His parents were hatter Isaac Davies, and his wife Rachel. They lived in the Llandovery area, where he attended a local school, and subsequently studied at Borough Road Training College. In 1858 became master of Mill Street school, ‘ Ysgol y Comin ’, Aberdare, where he encouraged his assistants to use Welsh as the medium of education. In 1867 he moved to a school in Swansea, before in 1868 being made Assistant Inspector of Schools, moving first to Cheltenham (in 1870), then to Bristol (in 1877). In 1883 he returned to Wales, to a position in the Merthyr Tydfil district (though he lived in Cardiff).

He may be recognised, at the National Eisteddfod in Aberdare (1885), as one of the founders of the ‘ Society for the Utilization of the Welsh Language ,’ today known as ‘ The Welsh Language Society.

He died in May 1887.

== Biography ==
=== Family ===
Davies came from a family of tradespeople and general labourers. His father ran a hatters shop in Llandovery. His paternal grandfather, Evan David, and three paternal uncles, John Evan David, Evan Davies, and Jacob Davies were blacksmiths. Jacob Davies was a prominent blacksmith in Llandybie, Carmarthenshire. His tools were of a superior quality and "every craftsman thought the world of the tools" made in his smithy. His smithy also created the iron gates that stand in front of the local church to this day.

Davies' paternal aunt, Eliza Davies, married a hatter's apprentice of Dan Isaac Davies' father, in 1838; however, such marriage was abusive and ended in a bigamy trial at the Carmarthenshire Assizes in March, 1847, soon followed by Eliza's death in June of that year.

== Literary works ==
1885. Yr Iaith Gymraeg 1785, 1885, 1985!: Neu, Tair Miliwn O Gymry Dwy-Ieithawg Mewn Can Mlynedd: Cyfres o Lythyrau.
