= Evan Davies (Independent minister) =

Welsh Independent minister

Evan Davies (1750-1806) was a Welsh Independent minister, born in the Llandysul area of Ceredigion. He was the son of the minister James Davies. Evan studied for a number of years at Carmarthen Academy, before in 1775 being ordained co-pastor of the church at Llanedy, Carmarthenshire. He remained in the post until his death, aged 56, in 1806. He is known to have been instrumental in establishing several churches, such as those at Llanelly, Capel Als (1780), and Cross Inn, Ammanford (1782).
