= Ffred Ffransis =

Welsh activist and linguist

Ffred Ffransis (born Frederick Sefton Francis, 14 June 1948), is a prominent member of Cymdeithas yr Iaith Gymraeg (The Welsh Language Society).

== Biography ==
He was born in Colwyn Bay, but lived in Rhyl for most of his childhood. The son of English-speaking parents Marjorie Francis and Frederick Francis, he learnt basic Welsh at secondary school, and became fluent during his time as a student in the University of Wales, Aberystwyth.

He became involved in the Welsh language scene, and became a Welsh language activist. He has served many jail sentences for taking part in non-violent direct action in the name of Cymdeithas yr Iaith Gymraeg.

He is married to Meinir Ffransis, the daughter of Gwynfor Evans, Plaid Cymru's first member of Parliament, and has seven children - Lleucu Meinir, Carys Llywelyn, Angharad Clwyd, Hedd Gwynfor, Gwenno Teifi, Siriol Teifi and Ioan Teifi.

He is a well known supporter of football club Rhyl F.C.
