= Evan Tom Davies =

Welsh mathematician

- Born: 24 September 1904; Pencader, Carmarthenshire, Wales
- Died: 8 October 1973 (aged 69); Waterloo, Ontario, Canada
- Known for: Studying applications of the Lie derivative and manifolds
- Spouses: Margaret Helen Picton, Hilda Gladys Boyens
- Children: 1
- Scientific career
- Doctoral advisor: Tullio Levi-Civita

Evan Tom Davies (24 September 1904 – 8 October 1973) was a Welsh mathematician. He studied applications of the Lie derivative as it relates to Riemannian geometry as well as absolute differential calculus, and published a large number of papers relating to the subjects.

== Early life ==
Davies was born in 1904 in Pencader, Carmarthenshire, a small village in Wales. He was the son of two farmers and attended a local primary school. After finishing primary school, Davies received a full ride scholarship to Llandysul County School in the neighbouring town of Llandysul. There he became friends with Evan James Williams, a future professor of physics at Aberystwyth University and member of the Royal Society. In 1921, he enrolled in Aberystwyth University. He would graduate with a Bachelor of Science with honours in the field of applied mathematics. After graduation he went to Swansea University where he studied pure mathematics and received his master's degree. Davies would move to Rome in August 1926 to study with the leading expert on absolute differential calculus, Tullio Levi-Civita. There he received his doctorate.

== Career ==
In 1930, after a short academic break due to poor health, Davies accepted a position as an assistant lecturer at King's College London. There he was promoted twice, first to Lecturer in 1935, and later to Reader in 1946. Davies was affected by the evacuation of King's College due to the London Blitz and was forced to temporarily relocate to the University of Bristol. After the conclusion of the Second World War and his subsequent promotion to Lecturer; Davie would become the chair of mathematics at the University of Southampton. He stayed at Southampton until his retirement in 1969 at the age of 65. After retirement, he went on to be a professor of mathematics at the University of Calgary for a period two years until leaving to be a professor at the University of Waterloo. He died at the age of 69 while employed there.

=== Publications ===
- On the infinitesimal deformations of a space (1933)
- On the deformation of a subspace (1936)
- On the infinitesimal deformations of tensor submanifolds (1937)
- On the second and third fundamental forms of a subspace (1937)
- Analogues of the Frenet formulae determined by deformation operators (1938)
- Lie derivation in generalized metric spaces (1939)
- Subspaces of a Finsler space (1945)
- Motions in a metric space based on the notion of area (1945)
- The theory of surfaces in a geometry based on the notion of area (1947)
- On the invariant theory of contact transformations (1953)
- Parallel distributions and contact transformations (1966)

== Personal life ==
Davies' first marriage was to Margaret Helen Picton in 1941, but she died a few years later in 1944. In 1955 he remarried, to Hilda Gladys Boyens, and they had one son. He made a hobby of linguistics and was fluent in five languages.
