= List of Welsh musicians =

The following is a list of notable Welsh musicians and musical groups.

== Traditional ==
This category includes music that has its roots in the Middle Ages and Renaissance or the instruments of these periods, as opposed to traditional vocal music or folk music (see below).

- Nansi Richards – a triple harp player
- Robin Huw Bowen – a triple harp player
- Ceri Rhys Matthews – a multi-instrumentalist, plays the pibgorn or Welsh bagpipes, wooden flute, and others
- Fernhill – a folk band, that features Ceri Rhys Matthews and often employs the pibgorn
- Carreg Lafar – a traditional Welsh folk group, featuring Antwn Owen Hicks, Linda Owen Jones, Rhian Evan Jones, James Rourke and Danny Kilbride

== Choirs ==
- Côr Godre'r Aran
- Gwalia Singers
- Morriston Orpheus Choir
- Pontarddulais Male Choir
- Treorchy Male Voice Choir

=== Choral conductors ===
- Sioned James (1974–2016)

== Classical ==
- Charlotte Church
- Hannah Stone
- Rebecca Evans
- Bryn Terfel
- Gwawr Edwards
- Katherine Jenkins
- Aled Jones
- Catrin Finch
- Wynne Evans
- Llŷr Williams
- Shân Cothi

== Folk ==
- 9Bach
- Allan Yn Y Fan
- Ar Log
- Carreg Lafar
- Dafydd Iwan
- Fernhill
- Julie Murphy
- Martyn Joseph
- Max Boyce
- Meic Stevens
- Morus Elfryn
- Novo Amor
- Plethyn
- Roy Harris
- Sian James

== Pop, rock and metal ==
- 60 Ft. Dolls
- The Alarm
- Amen Corner
- Anhrefn or Yr Anhrefn
- Andy Scott
- Anweledig
- Attack! Attack!
- The Automatic
- Badfinger
- Y Bandana
- Big Leaves
- Billy Bibby & The Wry Smiles
- The Blackout
- Blonde on Blonde
- Bonnie Tyler
- Bright Light Bright Light
- Budgie
- Bullet for My Valentine
- Burke Shelley
- Candelas
- Catatonia
- Cate Le Bon
- Catfish and the Bottlemen
- Cowbois Rhos Botwnnog
- Crys
- Cuba Cuba
- The Darling Buds
- Datblygu
- Dave Edmunds
- Deke Leonard
- Donna Lewis
- David Alexander
- Desecration
- Dream State
- Dub War
- Duffy
- Elin Fflur
- Estrons
- Euros Childs
- Feeder
- Ffa Coffi Pawb
- Funeral for a Friend
- Future of the Left
- Gary Pickford-Hopkins
- Gene Loves Jezebel
- Goldie Lookin Chain
- Gorky's Zygotic Mynci
- Green Gartside
- Gruff Rhys
- Gwenno
- Himalayas
- Holding Absence
- Howl Griff
- Islet
- Jarcrew
- Jayce Lewis
- John Cale
- John Lawrence
- John Porter (musician, born 1950)
- John Weathers
- The Joy Formidable
- Karl Wallinger
- Kids in Glass Houses
- Kristian Lavercombe
- Llwybr Llaethog
- Lisa Scott-Lee
- Los Campesinos!
- Lostprophets
- Love Sculpture
- Man
- Manic Street Preachers
- Marina Diamandis
- Mary Hopkin
- mclusky
- Micky Jones
- Murry the Hump
- Neck Deep
- Neon Neon
- People in Planes
- Phil Campbell
- Phil Ryan
- Pino Palladino
- Gary Pickford-Hopkins
- The Oppressed
- Pocket Venus
- Pretty Vicious
- Panic Shack
- Ray Phillips
- Question The Mark
- Roger Glover
- Racing Cars
- Ricky Valance
- The Royston Club
- Sassafras
- The School
- Scritti Politti
- Shakin' Stevens
- Shirley Bassey
- Shooting at Unarmed Men
- Sibrydion
- Sion Russell Jones
- Skindred
- Spencer Davis
- Stereophonics
- Steve Strange
- Steve Williams
- Super Furry Animals
- Sŵnami
- Terry Williams
- Tigertailz
- Tom Jones
- Toy Horses
- Who's Molly?
- World Party
- Young Marble Giants
- Yws Gwynedd

== Electronic ==
- DJ Sasha
- High Contrast
- Hybrid
- Kelly Lee Owens
- Overmono
- Tim Wright aka. CoLD SToRAGE
- Underworld

== Bluegrass ==
- The Beef Seeds
