= So This Is Great Britain? =

So This is Great Britain?

Studio album by The Holloways
- Released: 30 October 2006
- Genre: Indie rock, post-punk revival, garage rock
- Label: TVT (UK)
- Producer: Clive Langer, Alan Winstanley

The Holloways chronology
| So This is Great Britain? (2006) | No Smoke, No Mirrors (2009) |

Professional ratings
Review scores
| Source | Rating |
|---|---|
| AllMusic | link |
| NME | 8/10 link |
| Spin | link |

So This is Great Britain? is the debut album from The Holloways, released 30 October 2006 on the back of the band's first two singles, "Two Left Feet" and "Generator", which appear on the album. They also released "Dancefloor" as a single.

The album was re-released on 1 October 2007 with slightly altered art work and a second disc of B-sides.

The album has received positive reviews.

== Track listing ==
All tracks are written by Alfie Jackson, Bryn Fowler, Robert Skipper and Dave Danger except as noted

| No. | Title | Length |
|---|---|---|
| 1. | "So This Is Great Britain?" | 3:01 |
| 2. | "Generator" | 2:57 |
| 3. | "Dancefloor" | 3:57 |
| 4. | "Fit for a Fortnight" | 3:38 |
| 5. | "Two Left Feet" | 3:01 |
| 6. | "Re-Invent Myself?" | 3:27 |
| 7. | "Most Lonely Face" | 5:05 |
| 8. | "Malcontented One" | 2:35 |
| 9. | "Happiness and Penniless" | 2:50 |
| 10. | "What's the Difference?" | 2:29 |
| 11. | "Diamonds and Pearls" | 3:34 |
| 12. | "Nothing for the Kids" | 3:13 |
| 13. | "Fuck Ups" | 3:09 |

2007 Deluxe Edition Bonus Disc
| No. | Title | Writer(s) | Length |
|---|---|---|---|
| 1. | "London Town" | | 3:42 |
| 2. | "The Many Very Merry" | | 2:42 |
| 3. | "Sound of the Sunshine" | | 2:33 |
| 4. | "One Mad Kiss" | | 2:38 |
| 5. | "Your Fragrance Was Worn By an Ex of Mine" | | 3:15 |
| 6. | "Here We Go Again" | | 2:23 |
| 7. | "Pushing and Shoving" | | 2:50 |
| 8. | "Kings Cross Cutie" | | 3:10 |
| 9. | "Hatred & Anger" | | 2:23 |
| 10. | "I Should Say Something" | | 3:17 |
| 11. | "Thanks to All the Girls I'll Never Love" | | 3:12 |
| 12. | "Asprin" | | 3:00 |
| 13. | "Hallelujah I Love Her So" | Ray Charles | 2:53 |

== Personnel ==
- Nathaniel Chan - Assistant, Digital Editing
- Ben Cook - Cover Photo, Sleeve Photo
- Dario Dendi - Assistant, Digital Editing
- Simon Hale - Keyboards
- Jenny Hardcore - Sleeve Photo
- Alfie Jackson - Vocals, Guitar, Composer
- Leonard B. Johnson - A&R
- Clive Langer - Mixing, Producer
- Cesar Gimeno Lavin - Assistant, Digital Editing
- Joshua Mascolo - Cover Star
- Daniel Mead - Cover Design
- Gregory Nolan - Sleeve Photo
- Markell Riley - Assistant, Digital Editing
- Rob Skipper - Fiddle, Guitar, Sleeve Photo, Vocals
- Julian Willmott - Assistant, Digital Editing
- Alan Winstanley - Engineer, Mixing, Producer
