= Wakestock (Wales) =

Former welsh music festival

- Genre: Indie rock, Dance, Rock, Grime, Rap
- Dates: 1st weekend in July
- Locations: Wales; Penrhos, Wales (2000–2014); Blenheim Palace, Oxfordshire (2008)
- Years active: 2000–2014
- Founders: Mark Durston
- Website: wakestock.co.uk

Wakestock was Europe's largest wakeboard music festival, combining the cultures of music and wakeboarding. It was held on the Llŷn Peninsula in Wales, in between Pwllheli and Llanbedrog.

Founded by Mark Durston, the festival began in Abersoch, north Wales back in 2000, when it was a wakeboard contest with a party in a car park for 800 people, and from then on played host to some of the industry's leading bands and DJs, along with the biggest wakeboard competition in Europe. In 2008 50% of the festival was sold to Kilimanjaro Live aka KiliLive.com. In 2010 the festival entered its second decade and become part of the World Wakeboard Series. After the 2010 festival founder Mark Durston took an exit to work on other projects with full ownership then taken on by Kilimanjaro Live.

The festival was split over three sites – the main festival site at Penrhos, Pwllheli Marina hosts the main wakeboard competition and Abersoch Bay hosts the Big Air Classic competition. The festival prides itself as being at the foot of the Snowdonia Mountains and looks out over Cardigan Bay.

The festival had its own wakeboard 'Pool Gap' that allows the wakeboarders to showcase the sport up on the festival site. The Pool Gap consisted of two pools containing a total of 200,000 gallons of water connected by street style handrails that the wakeboarders slid along whilst being towed by an overhead cable system.

In February 2015 it was announced on Twitter and Facebook that the festival would not be held that year, but would return for 2016. In 2016 the festival was cancelled again. Organisers said, "It isn’t necessarily the case that Wakestock will never happen again but a significant level of investment in terms of time and money will need to take place ... before any commitment takes place." As of 2017 there have been no further announcements and the official website has been closed.

== Staging ==
Up until at least 2013 the festival had three stages. Originally these were called the "Open Air Stage", the "Misadventures Stage", and the "Relentless Stage". The names were later changed to West Stage, East Stage, and South Stage. Across all three stages there was a mixture of live bands and DJs.

== 2014 Line-up ==
This was the last festival to be held. Acts included: Tom Odell, Frank Turner, John Newman, Razorlight, Clean Bandit, Duke Dumont, Gorgon City, Frightened Rabbit, Ella Eyre, Catfish and the Bottlemen, Jess Glynne.

== 2013 Line-up ==
Included: Bastille, Rudimental, Example, Magnetic Man, James, Twin Atlantic, Wiley, The 1975, Wretch 32, Zane Lowe, Echo & the Bunnymen, Candelas, Huw Stevens, Catfish and the Bottlemen, Kids in Glass Houses, Yr Eira

== 2012 Line-up ==
The campsite opened from 1pm on Thursday 5 July. From 6pm the campers could attend the Wakestock pre-party if they had purchased a Thursday night arena pass for £10. They also needed to be in possession of a weekend camping, single day camping or vip weekend camping ticket. Nitro hosted the Thursday night pre-party with DJs Jaguar Skills, Nitro resident Jigsaw and Plastic Thumbs in the East Arena, doors opened from 6pm-12am.

On Thursday, 19 July at 12.50am Channel 4 aired a programme showing the highlights of the festival.

West Stage
Friday 6 July	Saturday 7 July	Sunday 8 July
Calvin Harris; Rizzle Kicks; Huw Stephens; Random Impulse; Alunageorge; L Marshall; Burns; Lilygreen & Maguire	Dizzee Rascal; Katy B Zane Lowe; Goldierocks; All The Young; Swiss Lips; Y Bandana	Ed Sheeran; Chiddy Bang; Benjamin Francis Leftwich; Clement Marfo; Mikill Pane; Ryan Keen; Br Lewis

East Stage
Friday 6 July	Saturday 7 July	Sunday 8 July
Flux Pavilion; Hadouken! Koan Sound; Smiler; Bastille; Lulu James; Sen Segur	Annie Mac; DJ Fresh Live; Ms Dynamite; Breakage; Karma Kid; Jigsaw; Ifan Dafydd	The All American Rejects; Funeral for a Friend; Yashin; Straight Lines; A Plastic Rose; Sŵnami

South Stage
Friday 6 July	Saturday 7 July	Sunday 8 July
High Contrast feat Jessy Allen and Dynamite MC; Friction; Major Look; Plastic Thumbs; Jigsaw; Ed Mackie; F-Block	Jacwob; Doctor P Delta Heavy; Jagga; Simplex; Ben Proudlove; Andy Carr	Redlight; B.Traits; Youngman; Jimmy Needles; Heavy Feet; Church

== 2011 Line-up ==
West Stage
Friday 8 July	Saturday 9 July	Sunday 10 July
Ellie Goulding; Kids in Glass Houses; Huw Stephens; Lethal Bizzle; Neon Trees; Wolf Gang; Ben Howard; Mr Phormula	The Wombats; Beardy Man; The Joy Formidable; Fenech-Soler; Little Comets; All the Young; Bare Left	Biffy Clyro; The Cribs; The Noisettes; Charlie Simpson; Pulled Apart by Horses; Sibrydion

East Stage
Friday 8 July	Saturday 9 July	Sunday 10 July
Chase and Status; Zane Lowe; Chiddy Bang; Kissy Sell Out; Dev; Yasmin; Rizzle Kicks	Kelis; Sub Focus; Far East Movement; Modestep; Totally Enormous Extinct Dinosaurs; Friends Electric; Giant Steps	Example; Wretch 32; Ed Sheeran; Jaymo and Andy George; Random Impulse; Encore

South Stage
Friday 8 July	Saturday 9 July	Sunday 10 July
DJ Fresh and Dynamite MC; Danny Byrd; Brookes Brothers; Union; Tek 1 Micky Slim; Gutterfunk	Caspa and MC Rod Aslan; Herve; Nero; Redlight; Plastic Thumbs; Jigsaw	Jaguar Skills; Masters in France; Colorama; Mr Huw; Inner Party System; Pocket Trez

== 2010 Acts ==
=== Friday 2 July ===
Open Air stage

- Eric Prydz
- Fedde Le Grand
- Audio Bullys
- The Count & Sinden
- Bodyrox
- Zinc
- Dynamite MC
- Norman Jay
- Kenneth Buttplug

Misadventures Stage

- N-Dubz
- Mr Hudson
- Wiley
- Roll Deep
- McLean
- Pretty Lights
- Mr Phormula

Relentless Live

- Skream
- Toddla T & MC Serocee
- Jakwob
- Plastic Thumbs
- Jigsaw vs Rocketman
- Ben Proudlove

=== Saturday 3 July ===
Open Air stage

- Maxïmo Park
- Feeder
- Plan B
- The Last Republic
- Pete Lawrie

Misadventures Stage

- Chase & Status
- Zane Lowe
- Tinie Tempah
- Ou Est Le Swimming Pool
- Kissy Sell Out
- Tim Lyall

Relentless Live

- Scratch Perverts
- Nervo
- Goldierocks
- Duke
- SBTRKT
- Micky Slim
- Gutterfunk DJs

=== Sunday 4 July ===
Open Air stage

- The Ting Tings
- The Futureheads
- Band Of Skulls
- Los Campesinos!
- Race Horses
- Polly Mackey and The Pleasure Principle
- Y Niwl

Misadventures Stage

- Pete Tong
- Robyn
- Sub Focus
- Alex Gaudino
- Fenech-Soler
- Nervo

Relentless Live

- The King Blues
- Huw Stephens
- Frankie & The Heartstrings
- Yr Ods
- Masters in France
- The Kickbacks

== 2009 Acts ==
Full list of acts as follows:

=== Friday ===
Open Air Stage

- Moby
- Chicane
- James Zabiela
- Wally López
- Norman Jay
- Tim Lyall
- Brandon Block

XFM Stage

- Calvin Harris
- Noisettes
- Tommy Sparks
- Kissy Sell Out
- Goldierocks
- Ebony Bones
- Lets Go To War
- Dirty Goods
- Flamboyant Bella

Relentless Pyramid stage

- Mr Scruff
- DJ Format
- Part Time Heroes
- Goldierocks
- DJ Play
- Emily Williams

=== Saturday ===
Open Air Stage

- N*E*R*D
- Super Furry Animals
- Elliot Minor
- Sibrydion
- Gallops
- Ruth Kealy

XFM Stage

- The Pigeon Detectives
- Fightstar
- The Joy Formidable
- Little Comets
- Spinnerette
- Chew Lips
- Haunts

Relentless Pyramid stage

- Chase & Status
- Goldie
- London Elektricity
- Gutterfunk DJs
- Tim Lyall
- James Condon
- Manipulate DJs
- Aled Mann

=== Sunday ===
Open Air Stage

- Dizzee Rascal
- Zane Lowe
- Tinchy Stryder
- Red Light Company
- The Mission District
- Fran & Josh

XFM Stage

- The Zutons
- Just Jack
- The Cuban Brothers
- Kid British
- Marina and the Diamonds
- Jett Black
- Yr Ods
- Lazy Boys

Relentless Pyramid stage

- Zane Lowe
- Huw Stephens
- Goldierocks
- Golden Silvers
- Young Fathers
- Pritchard Vs Dainton

== 2008 Acts ==
Full list of acts as follows:

Friday

- Groove Armada
- Pendulum
- Hadouken!
- Audio Bullys
- Plump DJs
- Trophy Twins
- Nu-Mark (Jurassic 5)
- Friendly Fires
- Sam Sparro
- Josh Gabriel
- Royworld
- TY
- Part Time Heroes

Saturday

- Mark Ronson
- Happy Mondays
- Funeral for a Friend
- Calvin Harris
- Elliot Minor
- Mystery Jets
- Operator Please
- The Blackout
- You Me At Six
- In Case Of Fire
- Norman Jay
- Jazzie B
- Brandon Block
- Genod Droog
- Kickbox Riot

Sunday

- The Streets
- The Futureheads
- Young Knives
- Lightspeed Champion
- The Nextmen
- Duffy
- The Hoosiers
- One Night Only
- Zane Lowe
- DJ Yoda
- Metronomy
- The Dykeenies
- Russian Dolls

== 2007 Acts ==
Incomplete list of acts:

- Ferry Corsten
- Yousef
- Mark Ronson
- Just Jack and the Shapeshifters
- Dirty Pretty Things
- Get Cape, Wear Cape, Fly
- Brandon Block

== Partners & Sponsors ==
Wakestock is involved with the local community and has partners from the surrounding area as well as some global names.

2010 partners list

- Relentless
- Malibu Boats
- We7
- Yamaha
- Hyperlite
- Jägermeister
- British Army
- RNLI

== See also ==
- Wakestock (Canada)
