= Goldierocks =

British DJ and journalist (born 1984)

Sam Hall
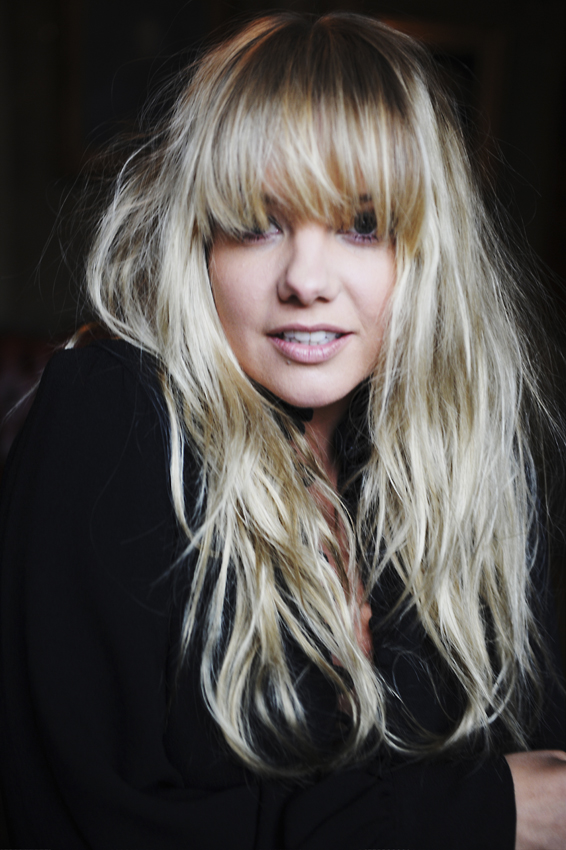
- Samantha in 2023
- Born: 30 October 1984 (age 42)
- Other name: Goldierocks
- Education: Goldsmiths College, University of London
- Occupations: Broadcaster & DJ
- Years active: 2004–present
- Website: OfficialGoldierocksWebsite

Samantha Louise Hall (born 30 October 1984), better known as Goldierocks, is a British DJ, broadcaster, journalist and voice over artist.

== Biography ==
Sam Hall, better known as Goldierocks, was born in Guildford, Surrey, England. She is an only child.

She studied a BA Hons in Drama & Theatre Arts from Goldsmiths College (University of London).

She first started working in music journalism at 16, working with local music venues, where she discovered her passion for live music and performance. Samantha now lives with her husband on The River Thames.

== Music Journalism ==
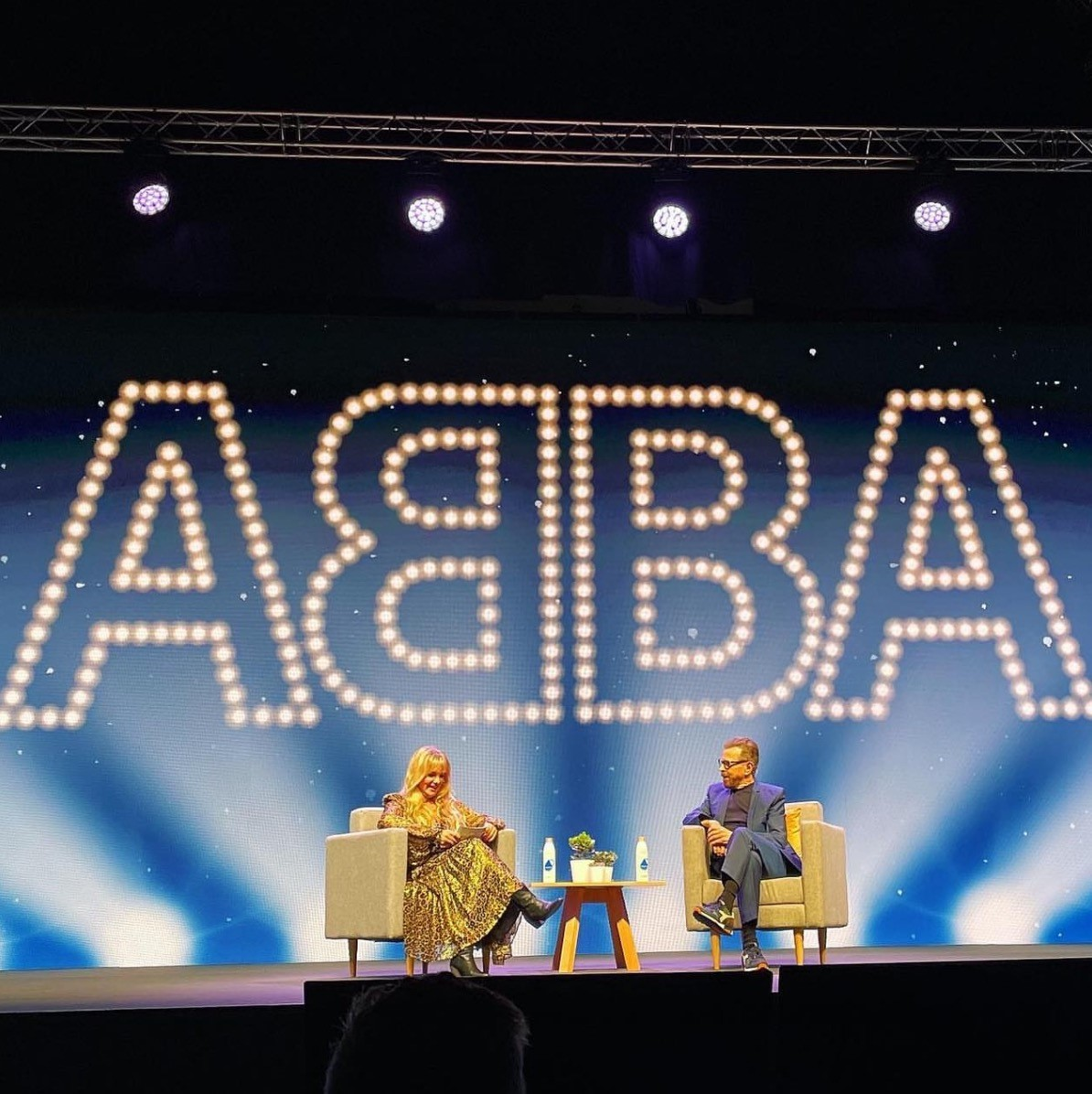
Samantha as Goldierocks

Goldierocks started her career as a staff writer for Rockfeedback (2001) interviewing such artists at The Killers, Ash and Melissa Auf Der Maur. Her DJ & radio broadcasting career soon took over from her writing. But she went on to be a monthly columnist for DJ Mag for 4 years writing about global parties & the underground rave scene. She is currently writing her first book (2023). She has hosted a number of live fireside chats with famous musicians in front of large live audiences including Björn Ulvaeus from ABBA & drum and bass DJ Goldie for the Radio Academy.

She has written articles for Music Week, Logo, NME, The Pix, official Glastonbury blogger for BEAT show on Bebo and Tamsin Blanchard's "Green Is The New Black" (Hodder, London, 2007).

== DJ ==
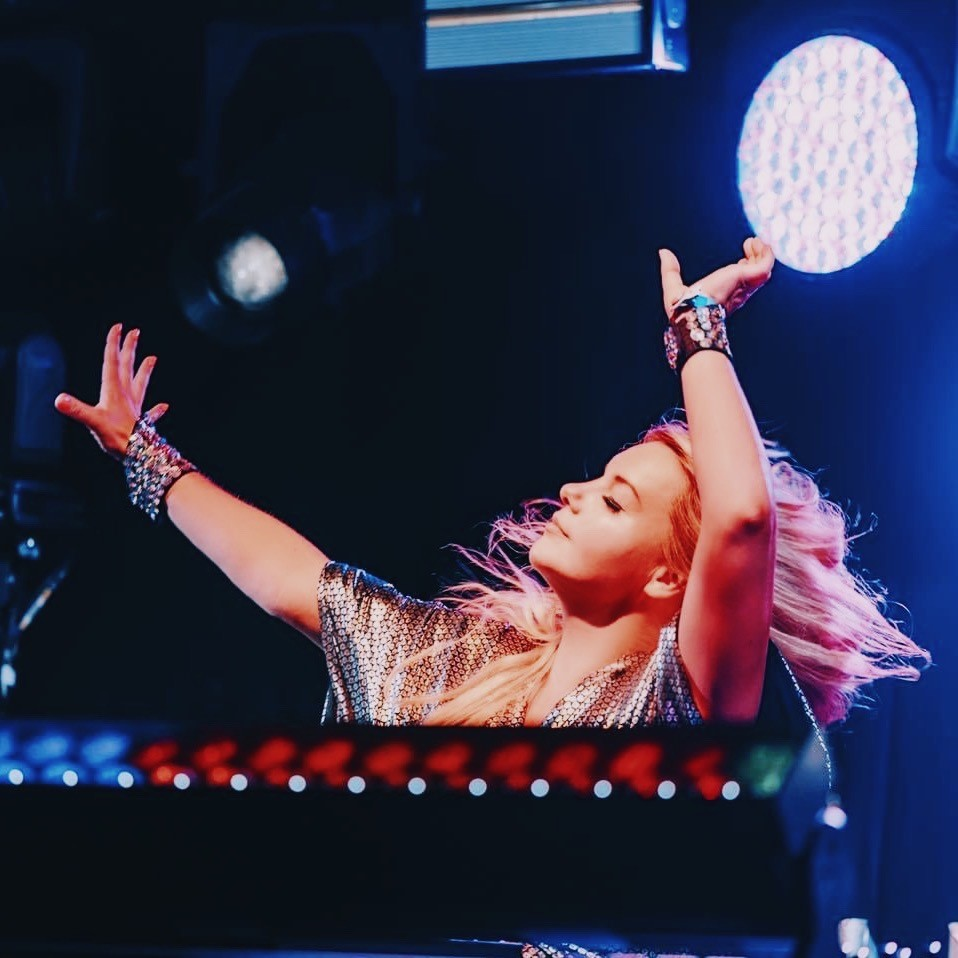
Goldierocks performing as DJ

Sam first started DJing (2004–present) at Rockfeedback's showcase club nights in London, where she soon gained notoriety for her theatrical and energised DJ appearances with Timeout London saying her live shows had "more personality than a Big Brother house". She quickly became popular and started performing across the city and abroad and now is one of UK festival circuit's favourite DJs.

She is well known for her dramatic stage presence and crowd interaction: stage diving, climbing on her decks and crowd surfing. She has DJ'd to thousands across five continents, at festivals, clubs & private parties. Private clients include Madonna, Giorgio Armani, Gordon Ramsay, David Beckham, Jade Jaggar, The Rolling Stones, Richard Branson, Larry Page, Eva Longaria & The Prince & Princess of Wales. Sam was an international DJ resident at Razzmatazz, Barcelona. Sam was a resident at Ibiza Rocks at Bar M. 2012 saw Sam DJ the opening ceremony of the London Paralympic Games in the Olympic Stadium to 85,000 people in the arena, including HRH Queen Elizabeth II, and over one billion watching on TV across the world.

During 2016 - 2023, she has been the headline DJ of ‘Classic Ibiza’ performing to over 90,000 over the course of the summer, playing deep house classics with a 32 piece live orchestra – Urban Soul Orchestra.

== Presenter of The Selector (2008-2018) British Council ==
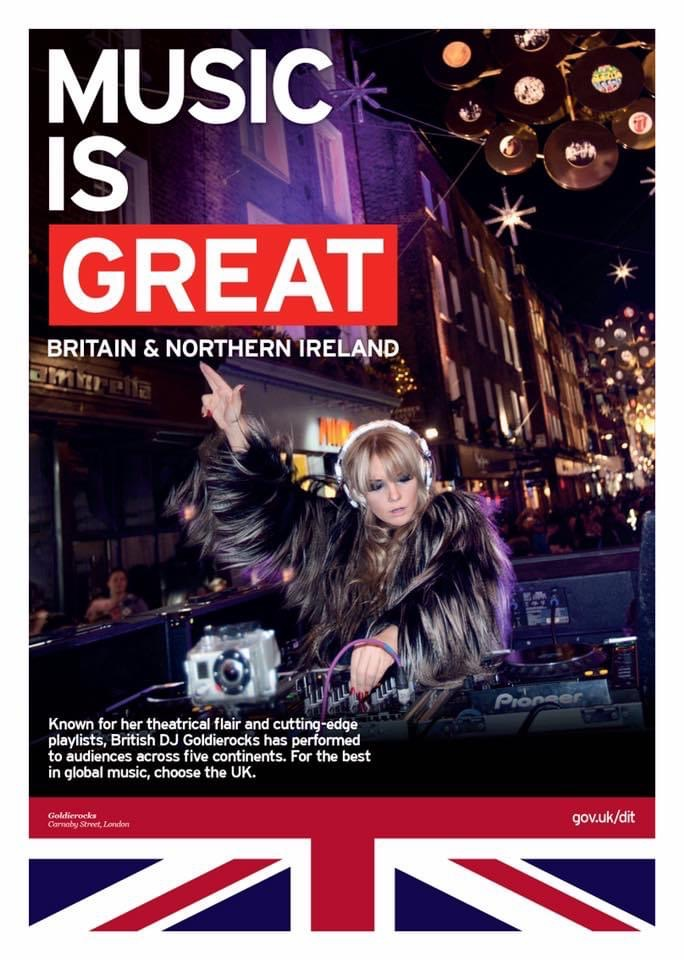
Goldierocks performing at Carnaby, London

Goldierocks presented The Selector in 2018. Produced by audio production companies Somethin' Else & then later Folded Wing. It is a two-hour, new music radio show containing live sessions, guest DJ mixes, record label & festival features, in-depth interviews. Broadcast globally on FM & online, at its peak to 46 countries, 4 million weekly listeners and shows across the China, South Korea, Morocco, Israel, Palestine, Thailand, Mauritius, Australia, Nepal, Ukraine, Bulgaria, Spain, Kazakhstan, Bosnia, Zambia, Uganda, Syria, Slovakia and British Airways Inflight Radio.

Her work with The Selector saw her become the first international female DJ to perform & broadcast in Cuba, & the first culture correspondent to go to Libya after the fall of Gaddafi in 2013, speaking at the Youth Forum in Tripoli. She also travelled to Egypt shortly after the Mubarak demonstrations to record 'The Selector' and meet other musicians, DJ's and young people with broadcast media career aspirations. She often visited countries in conflict to work with young people, community projects and create cultural exchange. Goldierocks travelled extensively with the show throughout her time as its presenter including visits to Malawi, Russia, Nepal, Mexico, South Africa and Malaysia. Sam devised the idea of ‘Selector After Dark’ a spin off one hour dance specialist show, to accompany The Selector. Sam was one of the pillar faces of the international ‘GREAT’ campaign for her contribution to British culture with The Selector around the world.

== Radio broadcaster ==
Sam hosted a show on Soho Radio from 2017- 2023, broadcast across Soho, LDN & Soho, NYC. She cohosted her first show on the station ‘Bestival FM’ with Rob da Bank. She was anchor of Capital FM's weekend dance show The Capital Weekender, broadcast nationwide across UK. She was an anchor for Ministry of Sound Radio. She was a key cover presenter on Capital Xtra. She was a cover presenter on BBC Radio 1. She hosted a special edition of her own radio show 'The Selector' on the International Radio Festival's 'Official Olympics Pop-Up Radio Bus' in London during the 2012 Olympics. Sam anchors a new interactive pop-up radio station 'Reebok Radio' broadcast live from the Manchester Warehouse Project on RWD mag. Sam hosts her own shows on pop-up festival radio stations Secret FM (Secret Garden Party) and Bestival Radio.

She has made guest appearances on BBC 6 Music's Steve Lamaq's Roundtable, Influential Women Podcast, Chris Hawkins How To DJ Podcast, The Travel Podcast, Priorities Podcast, Vick Derbyshire Show, BBC World Service, BBC Radio 4 'Today', Nihal's BBC Radio 1 review show, BBC 5 Live 'Music Review', Jo Good's Xfm Review Show, Sound Women's podcast, Radio Talk's podcast, Folded Wing 'Tuned Into The Future' podcast, BBC Production podcast, British Airway's 'Highlife', Kiss FM, Eddy Temple-Morris 'Remix' on Xfm, Diesel U Music Radio and Brother's Big Ears.

== TV Work ==
Sam was the official TV presenter for Gibraltar Calling interviewing Take That, Enrique Iglesias, Silga & Tom Walker. She was a contributor on Adeles’ ’30 Greatest Moments’ on Channel 5. She has appeared on BBC Newsnight on BBC2. She presented Your Body: Your Image 'Faking It' on BBC2, part of the BBC's body image series. She lifted the lid on exactly what goes into creating a single fashion photo, becoming a model for the day and discovering just how many people and how much patience is needed to transform from girl next door to glamour girl. Produced by Dale Templar (Human Planet), the episode was aimed at young schoolchildren to address body image and was played in classrooms nationwide. She was the blue team captain on Channel 4/4Music 'Pop Up Pop Quiz' alongside Ricky and Melvin, and Alice Levine. PUPQ- a travelling pop trivia quiz show complete with inflatable set and guest stars. She became part of the 4Music presenting team for Boom TV (12 week series). She presented alongside Twin B (BBC Radio 1Xtra) and MC Mr Midas. With guests including Professor Green, Roll Deep, N-Dubz and Bashy. She was the presenter for Brits.co.uk in 2010 & 20111. Sam went behind the scenes interviewing the nominees and performing artists and got all the gossip on the red carpet of the UK's biggest music award ceremony. She interviewed huge global stars like Cee Lo Green, Meat Loaf, Lily Allen, Dizzee Rascal, Temper Trap, Duran Duran and infamously persuaded Robbie Williams to pinch Kylie Minogue's bottom.

Sam co-presented the first 3 series of punk-rock show 'Red Bull Bedroom Jam' alongside Richie T. A live online music show searching for the best in unsigned talent, with a band performing a gig live from their bedroom across the country each week. She hosted the pop editions of HMV's 'Next Big Thing' and travelled the UK fronting 'Xbox Reverb' on Xbox Live, an interactive gig experience between bands and their fans featuring acts such as Pulled Apart By Horses, Dananananaykroyd, Ellie Goulding and Esser.

Goldierocks has made guest TV appearances on: 4Music 'Adele: Real Stories', 4Music's 'Lady Gaga: Real Stories', Transmission Channel 4, Xbox Live, BBC Blast (BBC Three), Jack Wills Varsity Polo Coverage, Jack Wills Varsity Rugby Coverage, SXSW Texas Music Festival Coverage, After Party Warehouse Project, VBS.tv (Vice UK), ASOS.com TV for London Fashion Week. Sam hosted the official festival coverage for Last FM throughout the Summer, reporting from SW4, Summer Sundae and Bloodstock Open Air. She also featured within 4Music's 'V:Inspired Taking Care of Christmas' seasonal special. 2013 saw her become one of the anchor presences of 'Fash Tag', part of the YouTube original content initiative, including their Brit Awards coverage.

== Voice Over ==
Sam has experience as a voice artist having worked with commercials, TV continuity & narrating audio books. Notable examples include Vauxhall and Huawei.

== Public Speaking ==
Her 2015 TEDx talk ‘The Enduring Power of Radio to change lives’ was inspired by her work visiting countries in conflict & striving to find a more effective way of local community projects being able to reach larger audiences of young people.

She is an advocate for mental health within the nightlife industries and has been a guest speaker about the topic at AVA Belfast, The University of Indonesia, Tag CDMX in Mexico City & London Music conference at Fabric Goldierocks has spoken at a number of specialist music panels at industry conferences such as In The City, London Calling, The Great Escape, The Radio Festival, Sound Women Festival, The Other Club, How Music, Warsaw Music Week and Zurich International Radio Festival.

== Philanthropic Work ==
In 2014 she travelled to Jordan with the charity Oxfam to visit Zataari, the second largest refugee camp in the world. Experiencing first-hand the lack of amenities and desperate need for aid, Sam created her first radio documentary with interviews and reports from her trip, stirring up public awareness and drumming up extra support for Oxfam's Syria Crisis campaign.

She has been a mentor for the national prison radio network, contributing towards workshops at HMS Brixton. She has been a mentor for the National Student Radio Organisation. She has collaborated with CARE international & The Mayor of London's office for their International Women's Day programming. She is a spokesperson for 'Lake of Stars' festival in Malawi, and the associated micro-loan projects & AIDS testing pop up centres that the festival charitably funds. She has given public support for CoppaFeel breast cancer awareness charity, Amnesty International, Choose Love & Green Peace.

== Production ==
Goldierocks has collaborated with Aaron Horn (son of Trevor Horn) on the below remixes.

- The Holloways Two Left Feet (2006)
- The Holloways Generator (2006)
- Foals Hummer (2007)
- Natty Cold Town (2008)
- King Charles End of Time (2008)
- Lucy & The Caterpillar Kings Cross (2008)
- The Kooks Do You Wanna (2008)
- Cock & Bull Kid Mother (2009)
- Crystal Fighters I Love London (2009)
- Zagar Wings of Love (2009)
