= Two Left Feet =

Having two left feet is an idiom for clumsiness, especially when dancing. It may also refer to:

- Two Left Feet (film), a 1963 British film
- "Two Left Feet" (song), a single by The Holloways
