= BYW (disambiguation) =

Byw or BYW may refer to

- Backyard wrestling, an underground hobby and sport of a style similar to professional-style wrestling.
- Baptist Young Women, a project of the Woman's Missionary Union
- Belhare language, a Sino-Tibetan language spoken in Nepal (iso-639-3 code: byw)
- Blakely Island Airport, Blakely Island, Washington, United States (IATA code: BYW)
- Brockley Whins Metro station, South Tyneside, England (station code: BYW)
- Byw, a 2004 EP by Welsh band Anweledig
- Backyard Worlds, a volunteer project searching for brown dwarfs and the hypothetical Planet Nine.
