= Bardd Plant Cymru =

Children's Welsh-language national poet

Bardd Plant Cymru (Welsh for 'Children's Poet (laureate) for Wales'; sometimes shortened to Bardd y Plant ('Children's poet (laureate)')) is the poet laureate of Welsh-language children's literature. It is one of the two national children's literature roles in Wales, alongside the English-language Children's Laureate Wales role. It is run by Literature Wales, and supported by the Welsh Government, S4C, the Welsh Books Council and Urdd Gobaith Cymru.

The current holder, for 2025–2027, is Siôn Tomos Owen. The role was established in 2000, and has since been held by 19 people.

== Description ==
Bardd Plant Cymru is a national literature role, which aims to encourage imagination and inspiration towards Welsh-speaking children using Welsh-language poetry. It was established in 2000, and managed by Literature Wales, and supported by the Welsh Government (specifically its Welsh Language Division), S4C, the Welsh Books Council and Urdd Gobaith Cymru. Since its establishment 18 poets have held the role. The role is awarded every two years, and to a poet that displays passion for children and young people to take up Welsh-language literature. All activities conducted by the Bardd Plant Cymru are conducted in the Welsh-language, although some extra support is provided to children and young people whose first language is not Welsh. Bardd Plant Cymru, as part of their role, can organise classroom poetry workshops, pen official children's poems for special occasions, create online children's literature resources, and act as a voice for literary children and young people nationally and internationally.

Bardd Plant Cymru is one of the two children's literature roles in Wales, alongside Children's Laureate Wales, which is the position representing English-language children's literature in Wales. Both roles are run by Literature Wales and run concurrently, although only further support is provided for the Welsh-language role.

By 2006, the position was chosen by a panel of judges, which would review nominations that have been put forward by librarians, writers, critics, and booksellers, including the International Board on Books for Young People (IBBY).

From 2011 the post was extended from a one year role to a two year appointment.

On 1 June 2023, at the 2023 Llandovery Urdd Eisteddfod, Literature Wales announced Nia Morais as the new Bardd Plant Cymru, taking over from the existing holder, Casi Wyn, in September 2023.

Specific commitments for the Bardd Plant Cymru is:

- Increase the access to Welsh-language literature for children and young people, specifically those from marginalised and under-represented backgrounds
- Improve the physical, mental health and well-being of children and young people through literature
- Increase the enjoyment of literature by children and young people.
- Empower children and young people through creativity

== List of holders ==
This is a list of the holders of the title, which are:

- 2000 – Myrddin ap Dafydd
- 2001 – Mei Mac
- 2002 – Menna Elfyn
- 2003 – Ceri Wyn Jones
- 2004 – Tudur Dylan Jones
- 2005 – Mererid Hopwood
- 2006 – Gwyneth Glyn
- 2007 – Caryl Parry Jones
- 2008 – Ifor ap Glyn
- 2009 – Twm Morys
- 2010 – Dewi "Pws" Morris
- 2011 – Eurig Salisbury
- 2013 – Aneirin Karadog (also as Bardd y Plant)
- 2015 – Anni Llŷn
- 2017 – Casia Wiliam
- 2019 – Gruffudd Owen
- 2021 – Casi Wyn
- 2023 – Nia Morais
- 2025 – Siôn Tomos Owen

== See also ==
- National Poet of Wales
- Chair of the Urdd National Eisteddfod
- Poet Laureate of the United Kingdom
- Poet laureate
