= Eurig Salisbury =

Welsh writer

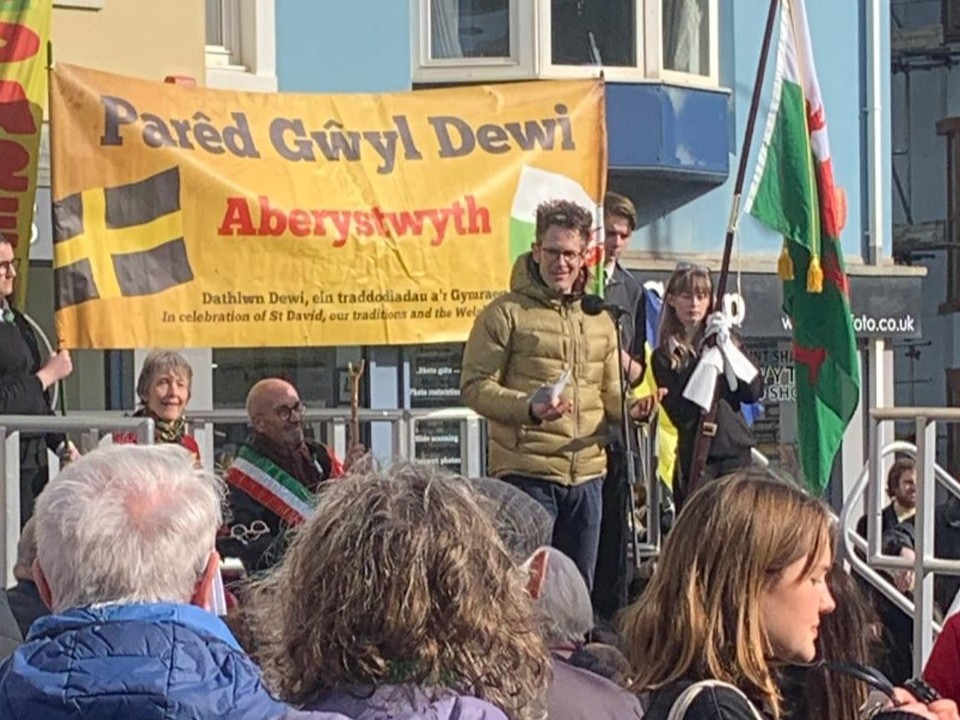
Eurig Salisbury speaking at the 2025 St Davids Day Parade in Aberystwyth

Eurig Salisbury (born 1983) is a Welsh writer and poet who won the Chair at the Urdd National Eisteddfod, the Prose Medal at the National Eisteddfod of Wales and became the Welsh Children’s Poet Laureate.

== Early life ==
Salisbury was born in Cardiff but brought up in Llangynog, Carmarthenshire, from the age of six. He was a pupil at Ysgol Gyfun Gymraeg Bro Myrddin and taught himself to write cynghanedd poetry while he was a teenager. Salisbury graduated in Welsh and Film and Television Studies at Aberystwyth University.

== Writing ==
Salisbury came second in the Chair competition at the Urdd National Eisteddfods in 2004 and 2005. At the 2006 Urdd Eisteddfod in Ruthin he won the Chair, also being placed second in the same competition. His winning poetry, written in cynghanedd strict metre, was on the subject of "Light" and was inspired by the sunsets he saw as he walked home from his monotonous Welsh Government translation job.

He published his first volume of poetry, Llyfr Glas Eurig, in 2008 and later published a book of poetry for children called Sgrwtsh! in 2011.

He was the Welsh Children's Poet from 2011 to 2013, taking over from Dewi Pws, with Salisbury's appointment announced during the 2011 Urdd National Eisteddfod. The appointment was extended to two years for the first time, with Salisbury planning to utilise new technology and make poetry fun and engaging..

In 2015 he became a lecturer in Creative Writing in the Department of Welsh and Celtic Studies at Aberystwyth University.

In 2016 Salisbury was achieved success in story writing, under the pen name Siencyn, winning the Prose Medal at the National Eisteddfod of Wales. His novel, Cai, was about a post-graduate student in the Aberystwyth area and described the difficulties living in west Wales.

He was resident poet for the Dyfed-Powys Police from 2018 to 2019.

In 2025 he began a two year appointment as resident poet for Strata Florida Abbey, which involved promoted the restoration work and events at the site.

== Personal life ==
Salisbury is married and has a son, Llew.
