= Kilimanjaro Live =

Entertainment company group in the United Kingdom

Kilimanjaro Live Group
- Industry: Entertainment; Entertainment Promoter
- Founded: 2008
- Headquarters: London
- Area served: United Kingdom
- Website: kilimanjarolive.co.uk

Kilimanjaro Live Group is a group of companies that work in the fields of music and comedy, based in the United Kingdom.

They own and operate Kew The Music, Live At Chelsea, Tartan Heart Festival, Stone Free Festival, Sonisphere Festival, Wakestock Festival and Warped Tour (Europe only).

== Awards ==
Music Week Awards Promoter of the Year 2023

Music Week Awards Promoter of the Year 2018

Prog Magazine Industry VIP Award 2018

Live UK Awards National Promoter of the Year 2018

Music Managers Forum Award for Outstanding Contribution to Live Music 2018

Metal Hammer Golden Gods Best Lineup The Big 4 at Sonisphere Festival 2011

== Myticket.co.uk ==
In 2014 Kilimanjaro's customer event listings website Kililive.com became MyTicket.co.uk in line with German parent company website Myticket.de.

== Festivals ==
=== Kew The Music ===
Kew The Music is a collaboration between Kilimanjaro Live, Raymond Gubbay Ltd and the Royal Botanic Gardens, Kew. Kilimanjaro has run the festival on the world heritage site since 2015.

=== Tartan Heart - Belladrum ===
2018 saw Kilimanjaro acquire Belladrum festival in Scotland. The well-established music and arts festival, held on the Belladrum Estate near Inverness, in Scotland. It is normally held at the start of August. Founded in 2004, the festival has rapidly grown in popularity. The festival has sold out in advance every year since 2008.

=== Sonisphere Festival ===
Sonisphere was a rock/metal touring festival taking place across Europe between June and August. The festival was created in 2009 by Kilimanjaro Live and John Jackson. It was jointly promoted by Kilimanjaro Live and K2. The festival has hosted heavy metal bands such as Iron Maiden, Metallica, Mötley Crüe, Slayer, Alice Cooper and Megadeth.

=== Wakestock Festival ===
Wakestock was Europe's largest wakeboard music festival, combining the cultures of music and wakeboarding. It was held on the Llŷn Peninsula in North Wales, in between Pwllheli and Llanbedrog.

=== Vans Warped Tour UK ===
Warped Tour was created in 1994 by Kevin Lyman and became sponsored by Vans Skateboards in 1995. The music/sports festival toured the US for many years before Kilimanjaro Live licensed the European operations of Warped Tour in 2012,2013,2014. In the United Kingdom, Warped Tour is hosted at Alexandra Palace in North London.

== Secondary ticketing court case ==
The online ticket marketplace Viagogo are taking Kilimanjaro to court in Germany over concerns over cancellations of tickets they resold for Ed Sheeran's 2018 UK tour.
