= Gai Toms =

Welsh singer-songwriter (born 1976)

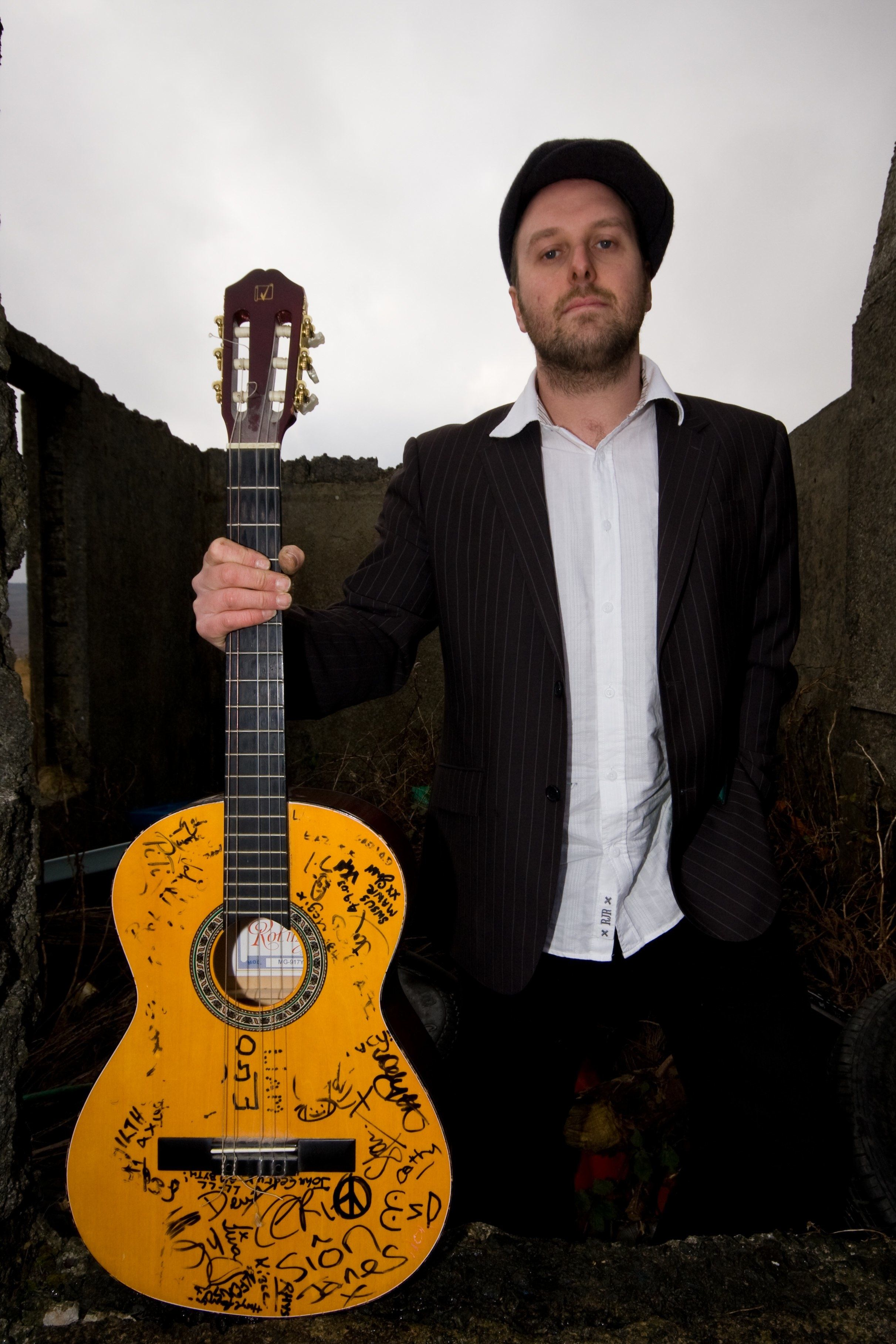

Background information
- Born: Gareth J Thomas; 14 September 1976 (age 50); Bangor, Gwynedd, Wales
- Origin: Blaenau Ffestiniog, Gwynedd, Wales
- Genres: Folk, brythonicana, rock, pop
- Occupations: Composer, producer
- Instruments: Guitar, bass, drums, banjo
- Years active: 1992–present
- Label: Sbensh / Sain (UK)
- Member of: Anweledig
- Website: www.gaitoms.com

Gareth 'Gai' J Thomas 'Toms' (born 14 September 1976 in Bangor, Wales) is a Welsh singer-songwriter, musician, producer and actor. In 1992 he co-formed the popular Welsh ska-rock band Anweledig, which developed into one of Wales' top live party bands. From 1997 to 2007 he created an 'off the road' Welsh folk outfit Mim Twm Llai, releasing three albums on Recordiau Sain. Since 2008, he dropped the Mim Twm Llai pseudonym for his own lifelong nickname Gai Toms, performing solo on guitar or with his backing band. His latest album titled 'Orig', based on the life of Welsh wrestling legend Orig Williams (El Bandito), gave us Gai Toms a'r Banditos (Gai Toms & the Banditos).

Gai Toms writes mainly in Welsh, his mother tongue, he also writes in English. Music styles vary from folk revival to indie rock, depending on album concepts and themes.

== Background ==
Toms was raised in the Merionethshire village of Tanygrisiau near Blaenau Ffestiniog, Wales. His father, Robert Meurig Thomas was an ex-quarryman, crane driver and bus driver, his mother, Margaret Gwenda Ellis, a machinist and school caretaker. His elder sister, Elaine, was an early musical influence on him, and sometimes accompanies him on backing vocals.

== Praise ==
In March 2012, Toms won the Cân i Gymru music competition. with Philip Lee Jones. Due to massive cuts in royalties for Welsh artists, he participated in the show/competition several times under different guises.

Gai Toms has won 10 BBC Cymru RAP awards, most for best songwriter.

Two of his albums have been nominated for Welsh Language Album of the Year at the National Eisteddfod: Brython Shag (with former Anweledig bandmate Ceri Cunnington) in 2015 and Gwalia in 2017.

== Gai Toms discography ==
- Y Filltir Gron (Album/CD – date TBC)
- Orig (Album/CD – 2019) Recordiau Sain
- Gwalia (Album/CD/LP – 2017) Sbensh
- The Wild, the Tame and the Feral (Album/CD – 2015) Sbensh
- Bethel (Double Album/CD – 2012) Sbensh
- Rhwng y Llygru a'r Glasu (Album/CD – 2008) Sbensh

== Mim Twm Llai discography ==
- Yr Eira Mawr (Album/CD – 2006) Crai
- Straeon y Cymdogion (Album/CD – 2005) Crai
- O'r Sbensh (Album/CD – 2002) Crai

== Anweledig discography ==
- Byw (EP/CD – 2004) Crai
- Low Alpine (EP/CD – 2001) Crai
- Gweld y Llun (Album/CD – 2001) Crai
- Scratchy (EP/CD – 2000) Zion Train collaboration. Crai
- Cae yn Nefyn (EP/CD – 1999) Crai
- Sombreros yn y Glaw (Album/CD/Cassette – 1998) Crai

== Other releases ==
- 2015: Brython Shag (writer / guitar) Sbensh
- 2005: Dore, Bob Delyn a'r Ebillion (bass) Sain
- 2006: Llythyrau Ellis Williams (sings Dilyn Gorwelion)
- 2006: Dan y Cownter 2, compiled by Huw Stephens (one song as Mim Twm Llai)
