= Morus Elfryn =

Welsh folk musician (1948/1949 – 2022)

- Elfryn in 1975

Background information
- Born: 1948 or 1949
- Died: 22 March 2022 (aged 73)
- Genres: Welsh folk music
- Occupation: Musician

Morus Elfryn (c. 1948 – 22 March 2022) was a Welsh musician, television production manager and carpenter. Described by Gruff Rhys as a "maverick singer", he recorded for the Welsh-language label Sain in the 1970s and later worked on S4C programmes including C'mon Midffîld!.

== Career ==
Morus Elfryn was from Pontsiân, Ceredigion. He was educated at Ysgol Dyffryn Teifi, where he attracted notice as a rugby player. He then attended college in High Wycombe before returning to Wales. As a teenager, Elfryn started performing music as part of the folk trio Y Cwiltiaid. The group released three EPs on the Qualiton and Cambrian labels between 1967 and 1970.

In the early 1970s, Elfryn was a member of the satirical band Y Dyniadon Ynfyd Hirfelyn Tesog. After the group split following the death of leader Gruff Miles, Elfryn formed a duo, Morus Elfryn a Nerw, with fellow member Gareth "Nerw" Hughes Jones. The duo released the EP, Heibio'r Af, on Sain in 1974. Elfryn's only solo album, I Mehefin (Lle Bynnag y Mae), was released on Sain in 1975. Tracks from I Mehefin were later included on Welsh Rare Beat (2005) and Welsh Rare Beat 2 (2007), compiled by Andy Votel, Dom Thomas and Gruff Rhys. Gruff Rhys has described Elfryn as a "Celtic Gene Pitney" whose songs "always weave an atmospheric narrative reminiscent in subject matter to Scott Walker or Jacques Brel".

Characterised by Dafydd Iwan as a private and family-oriented man, Elfryn retired from live performances in 1985 and moved to working in television. From the 1980s, he was a production manager with Ffilmiau'r Nant and worked on S4C programmes including the popular sitcom C'mon Midffîld! and Pengelli. He was later involved in the soap opera Rownd a Rownd. He was described as "Mr Fixer in the television world" by Dafydd Iwan. In later years, Elfryn moved to Waunfawr near Caernarfon. A carpenter by trade, he resumed his carpentry in retirement, making and selling furniture. He reunited with Gareth "Nerw" Hughes Jones for a live performance in 2015, his first in 30 years.

After a short illness, Elfryn died at Ysbyty Gwynedd on 22 March 2022, aged 73. In 2023, Elfryn's son Dei auctioned a quilt of beer towels from C'mon Midffîld! in his father's memory, with proceeds going to a cancer charity.
