= Owen Williams (Owen Gwyrfai) =

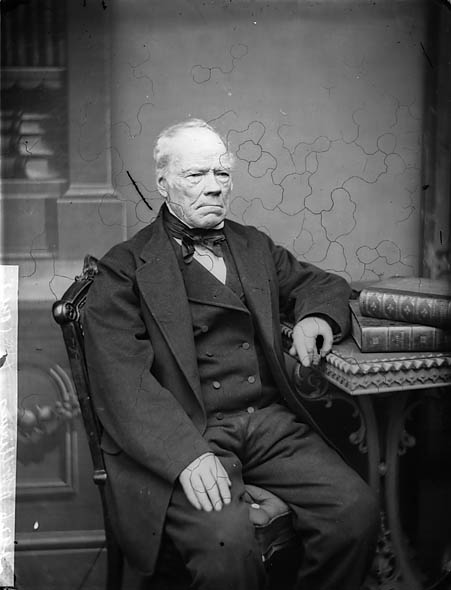
Owen Williams (Owain Gwyrfai, 1790-1874)

Owen Williams (January 1790 – 3 October 1874), also known as Owain Gwyrfai, was a Welsh antiquary and the author of a Welsh dictionary.

== Biography ==
Owen Williams was born on the Plas Glan'rafon estate, Waunfawr in January 1790 and was christened on 10 January 1790 at Betws Garmon. It was at the school in Waunfawr and Betws Garmon that he learnt the rules of prosody as a pupil of Dafydd Ddu Eryri. In 1824, Williams' Baron Richards was judged to be the best at Awdl the Cymreigyddion eisteddfod in Caernarfon. He died in Waunfawr on 3 October 1874 and was buried at the churchyard of St.Garmon's church in the nearby hamlet of Betws Garmon. A collection for his tombstone raised fifty pound and it was unveiled on 7 March 1879. During the eighty-four years of his life he collected letters and made notes on day-to-day life that are valuable and retain their interest.

== Works ==
His published works include a metrical version of the Song of Solomon (1820), Geirlyfr Cymraeg, a Welsh dictionary that was published in forty-five parts, and Hanes y deg erledigaeth o dan Rufain Babaidd (1847). Many of his unpublished manuscripts are in the National Library of Wales with at least six of the Cwrtmawr manuscripts containing the work of Owen Williams.

His son, Thomas Williams, published two books that include some of his works; Gemau Gwyrfai (1904) includes a biography of Owen Williams and Gemau Môn ac Arfon (1911) includes some of his antiquarian writings and transcriptions of poetry from ancient manuscripts.
