= Children's Laureate Wales =

Welsh children's national poet

The Children's Laureate Wales is the poet laureate of English-language children's literature in Wales. It is one of the two national children's literature roles in Wales, alongside the Welsh-language Bardd Plant Cymru role. It is run by Literature Wales.

The current holder, for 2025–2027, is Nicola Davies. The role was established in 2019, and since been held by four people.

== Description ==
Children's Laureate Wales is a national literature role, which aims to encourage imagination and inspiration towards children's literature in Wales. It was established in 2019, managed by Literature Wales, as part of its new 2019 Strategic Plan, and focuses on children aged between five and thirteen. Since its establishment three poets have held the role, and they are appointed following a public call-out to writers who may be interested in the role. The role is awarded every two years, and to a poet that displays passion for children and young people to take up literature. The Children's Laureate Wales, as part of their role, can organise classroom poetry workshops, pen official children's poems for special occasions, create online children's literature resources, and act as a voice for literary children and young people nationally and internationally. Over their two-year term, the Children's Laureate Wales, is to visit schools, clubs, festivals and events across Wales, and to devise and deliver bespoke activities with Literature Wales' "target client groups".

Children's Laureate Wales is one of the two children's literature roles in Wales, alongside Bardd Plant Cymru, which is the position representing Welsh-language children's literature in Wales. Both roles are run by Literature Wales and run concurrently, although only further support by the Welsh Government, Welsh Books Council and Welsh-language media is provided for the Welsh-language role.

Eloise Williams, the first holder of the position, was announced on 18 September 2019.

On 2 June 2023, at the 2023 Hay Festival, Literature Wales announced Alex Wharton as the new Children's Laureate Wales, taking over from the existing holder, Connor Allen, in August 2023. Allen received his offer to become Children's Laureate following Allen's visit to a Welsh prison, which Allen narrowly avoided earlier in his life, later becoming a poet. ITV News described his story as hoping to inspire others. Allen also headlined the inaugural Children's Festival in Haverfordwest, Pembrokeshire, while in the role.

In September 2023, Alex Wharton and his UK counterpart, criticised upcoming cuts to library services.

Specific commitments for the Children's Laureate Wales is:

- Increase the access to literature for children and young people, specifically those from marginalised and under-represented backgrounds
- Improve the physical, mental health and well-being of children and young people through literature
- Increase the enjoyment of literature by children and young people.
- Empower children and young people through creativity

== List of holders ==
This is a list of the holders of the title are:

- 2019 – Eloise Williams
- 2021 – Connor Allen
- 2023 – Alex Wharton
- 2025 – Nicola Davies

== See also ==
- National Poet of Wales
- Poet Laureate of the United Kingdom
- Poet laureate
