= Swiss Lips (album) =

Studio album by Swiss Lips
- Released: 16 March 2015
- Genre: Synthpop
- Length: 34:44
- Label: Foreverever / BMG
- Producer: Ric Levy

Swiss Lips chronology
Swiss Lips (2015)	Overflowing Futures (2015)

Swiss Lips is the self-titled debut album by Manchester band, Swiss Lips, released on 16 March 2015. It was released on the label Foreverever/BMG.

The album was produced and mixed by Ric Levy and recorded in Manchester and London. Artwork by Tom Ashlee featuring Ellie Hook.

== Critical reception ==
MTV Iggy writes, "Their self-titled album, out March 15, is exploding with flashy electropop enthusiasm" and "Keyboardist Tim Estherby’s opening synth is like a beam of fluorescent light announcing frontman Sam Hammond's zealous call for youthful abandon; surrender is inevitable, and pretty blissful. 'Honey' serves a similarly sized slice of shimmery liberation, and 'Diamonds' is as crystalline as its name implies."

== Track listing ==
All tracks are written by Swiss Lips.

No.	Title	Length
1.	"Books"	3:56
2.	"U Got The Power"	3:29
3.	"Honey"	3:51
4.	"Diamonds"	3:31
5.	"Over And Over"	2:38
6.	"In The Water"	3:57
7.	"Forever"	3:36
8.	"Carolyn"	3:34
9.	"Kid"	2:53
10.	"Running Away"	3:20
Total length:		34:44
