= Twm Morys =

Welsh poet and musician

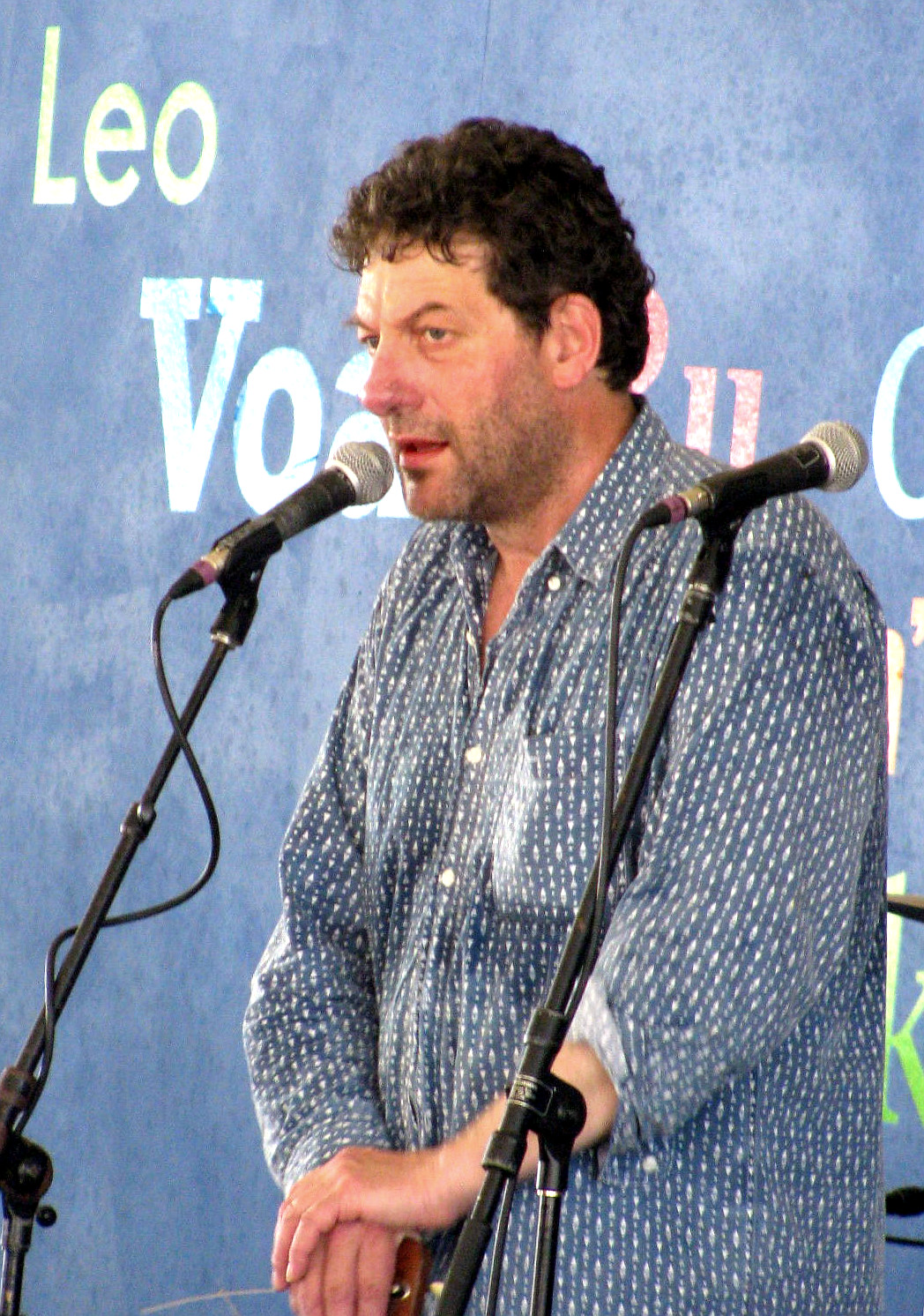
- Morys at the 2013 Smithsonian Folk Festival
- Born: 1961 (age 64–65); Oxford, England
- Education: Marshcourt, Shrewsbury School, Brecon High School
- Alma mater: University of Wales, Aberystwyth
- Occupations: Poet, musician
- Parent(s): Jan Morris, Elizabeth Morris
- Writing career
- Language: Welsh
- Genre: Poetry
- Notable awards: Bardd Plant Cymru

Twm Morys (born 1961) is a Welsh poet and musician.

== Biography ==
Twm Morys was born in 1961 in Oxford, a son to the writer Jan Morris. He was brought up in Llanystumdwy and attended Ysgol y Llan, before attending Marshcourt boarding school at the age of seven, and then Shrewsbury School. Morys returned to Wales to study a Welsh-language A-level at Brecon High School. Morys graduated from the University of Wales, Aberystwyth with a degree in Celtic Studies; he also won the inter-collegiate chair whilst at the university.

He has worked for BBC Radio Cymru as a researcher and later as a poet and singer.

Morys later moved to Brittany, where he lived for ten years and worked as a lecturer at the University of Rennes.

In addition to two volumes of poetry, Twm Morys has written essays for literary reviews. He has collaborated with his mother Jan Morris on two volumes, Wales, the First Place (Random House, 1982), and A Machynlleth Triad/Triawd Machynlleth (Penguin, 1994). Ein Llyw Cyntaf (Gomer, 2001) is his Welsh adaptation of Jan Morris's novel Our First Leader. He won the chair at the 2003 National Eisteddfod for his poem Drysau (Doors).

He also writes for television and radio, as well as lyrics, which he sings with the folk-rock group, Bob Delyn a'r Ebillion.

Twm Morys was the Bardd Plant Cymru (Welsh children's poet laureate) for 2009–2010, and since 2011, he has been editor of the Welsh poetry magazine Barddas.

He lives in Llanystumdwy, Wales.

== Bibliography ==
=== Poetry ===
- Ofn Fy Het, Barddas (1995)
- Mymryn Bach o Hon (1998)
- 2, Barddas (2002)

=== Prose ===
- Grwyne Fawr, cyfres 'Y Man a'r Lle', Gwasg Gregynog (1998)

=== Work with Jan Morris ===
- Wales, the First Place, Random House (1982)
- A Machynlleth Triad, Penguin (1994)
- Ein Llyw Cyntaf, Gomer (2001)
