= Edwin Humphreys =

Welsh musician

- Born: Edwin Stavros Humphreys; 3 November 1963 (age 62); Y Fron, Caernarfon, Wales, UK
- Genres: Funk; Rock; Reggae Folk rock
- Occupation: Singer-songwriter
- Instruments: Saxophone; French Horn; Tuba; Piano; Clarinet
- Years active: ?–present

Edwin Stavros Humphreys is a Welsh musician born in Y Fron in 1963. He is a member of the group Anweledig, whose style is a mixture of funk, reggae, ska and rock. He is also a member of Bob Delyn a'r Ebillion. He runs a small studio in his home in Pentreuchaf in North West Wales. He was nicknamed Edwin "Chwarae fo powb" Humphreys by Welsh magazine Golwg.
