= Bob Delyn a'r Ebillion =

Folk-rock group from Wales

- Origin: Wales; Brittany
- Genres: Folk, rock, roots, country, reggae
- Years active: 1988 – present
- Labels: Sain; Recordiau Bos
- Members: Twm Morys; Gorwel Roberts; Edwin Humphreys; Nikolaz Davalan; Clare Jones; Rhydwen Mitchell; Gwyn Jones; Einion Gruffudd
- Past members: Nolwenn Korbell; Hefin Huws
- Website: Bob Delyn on Myspace.com

Bob Delyn a'r Ebillion (transl. Every Harp and the Pegs) are a folk-rock group from Wales, who sing both in Welsh and Breton.

== History ==
Fronted by Prifardd (transl. Chief Bard) Twm Morys, Bob Delyn a'r Ebillion are a major figure in the history of Welsh folk revival in the early 1990s. Their music combines an eclectic array of influences and instruments with more traditional Welsh folk and roots sounds.

Their debut album was released in 1990, which was according to Blake (2017) a time "when Welsh – in the arts and in daily life – was at a particularly low ebb." He goes on to state that the band were one of the first to form what was the inception of a new era of Welsh language music, which would lead on to the increased relevance of the language across the country.

One track written by the band, Cân John Williams, is typical of their identity. It speaks of John Williams, a man residing in a valley in the Black Mountains, who was one of only five Welsh speakers left.

Another track, Fy Mendith ar y Llwybrau, recalls a trip made by Morus to Canada and his longing for home during the journey.

The group's use of both Welsh and Breton has been praised, in tracks such as Meur a Wech, for showing "both the similarities and the differences between the two ancient Celtic languages."

In 2017 they released their first album in thirteen years, entitled Dal i ‘Redig Dipyn Bach.

== Discography ==
- Sgwarnogod Bach Bob (1990)
- Gedon (1992)
- Gwbade Bach Cochlyd (1996)
- Dore (2003)
- Dal i 'Redig Dipyn Bach (2017)
