= Howl Griff =

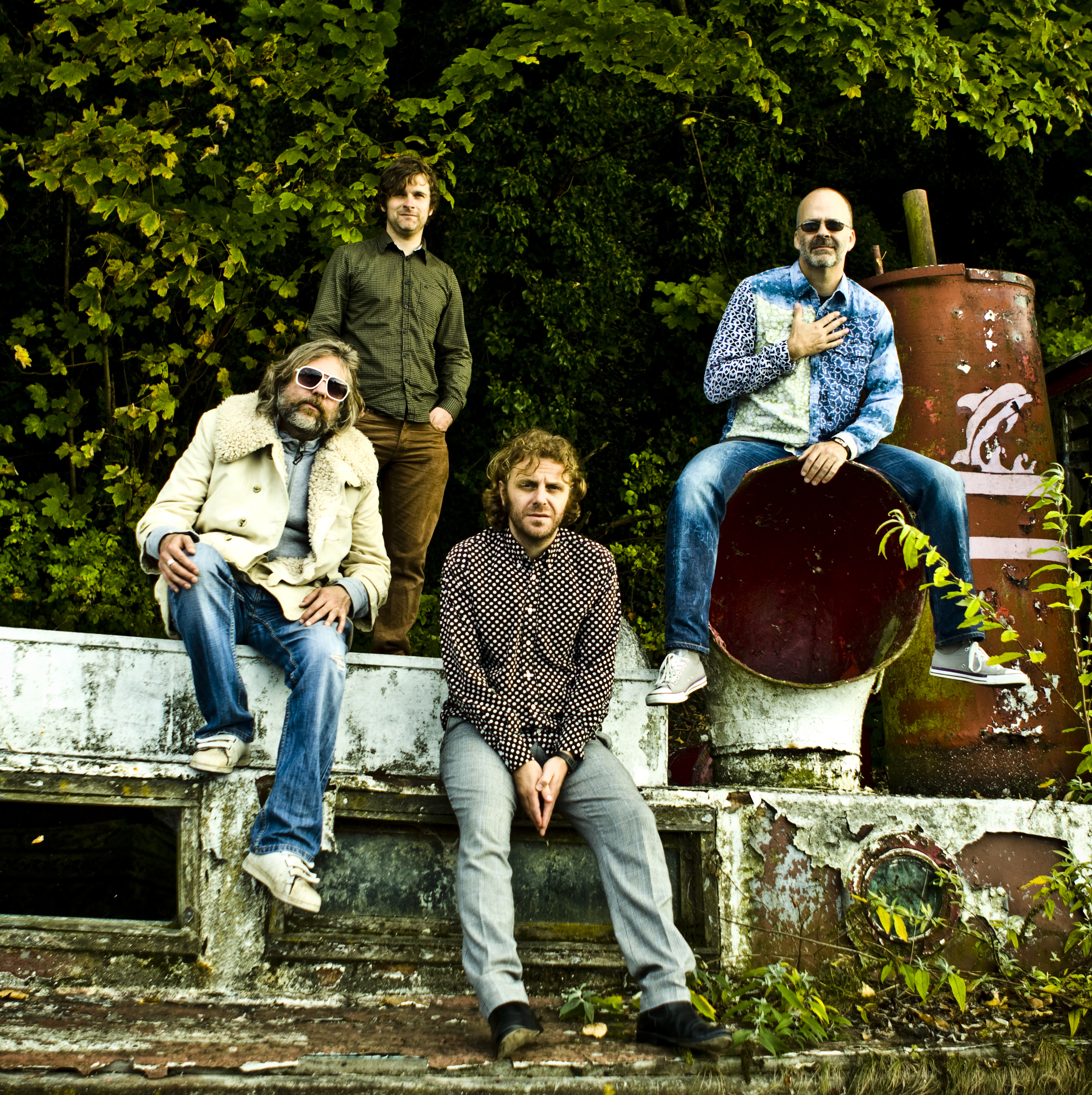
- Left to right: Hywel Griffiths, Nick Moore, Gary Parkinson and Steve Kennedy

Background information
- Origin: Wales
- Genre: Psychedelic rock
- Years active: 2006–present
- Label: Dockrad
- Members: Hywel Griffiths; Nick Moore; Gary Parkinson; Steve Kennedy; Adrian Evans
- Past members: John Davy; Matthew Barnes
- Website: Official website

Howl Griff, formed in Wales in 2006, is a five-piece psychedelic rock band currently signed to the Dockrad' label. The band contains members from Aberystwyth, Bolton, Merseyside and Texas but all currently live in London. They have released three albums: Howl Griff, in Welsh, and The Hum and Fragile Diamond, in English.

== History ==
The band's first (Welsh-language) album, Howl Griff (2008), was released on the Dockrad label. It received airplay on BBC Radio Cymru and BBC Radio Wales, and the band appeared on S4C shows Bandit and Uned 5 playing songs from the album. Some of the tracks of the album were re-recorded in English and released later in 2008 as The English EP.

The band's second album, The Hum, was released in late 2010 on the Dockrad/Catdog Label and spawned the singles "Bluebirds", "Crash and Burn", "Devotion" and "Sunrise". Tracks from the album were played across BBC Radio 6 Music and described by Lauren Laverne as "bloody lush".

The band's third album, Fragile Diamond, was released in October 2012.

In 2014, the band released new material, a double-A single, "We're Still Running" / "Backyard".

== Line-up ==
=== Current members ===
- Hywel Griffiths - lead vocals and rhythm guitar (2006-)
- Nick Moore - drums (2006-)
- Gary Parkinson - lead guitar (2006-)
- Steve Kennedy - bass guitar (2010-)
- Adrian Evans - keyboards (2015-)

=== Past members ===
- Matthew Barnes - bass guitar (2006–2010)
- John Davy - bass guitar (2010)

== Discography ==
- Hope Against Hope (demo) (2006)
- Howl Griff (2008)
- The English EP (2008)
- The Hum (2010)
- Fragile Diamond (2012)
- We're Still Running / Backyard (singles, 2014)
- “Maximalism (2016)”
