= Big Leaves =

Welsh rock band

- Origin: Waunfawr, Wales
- Genres: Indie rock
- Years active: 1988–2003
- Labels: Ankst, Crai, Whipcord, Metropolis, Dell'Orso
- Past members: Rhodri Sion; Meilir Gwynedd; Kevin Tame; Osian Gwynedd; Matt Hobbs

Big Leaves were a Welsh rock band formed in 1988, originally named Beganifs. They disbanded in 2003, with two members subsequently forming Sibrydion.

== History ==
The band was formed in 1988 as Beganifs by then 11- and 12-year-old school pupils Rhodri Sion (vocals), Meilir Gwynedd (guitar), Kevin Tame (bass guitar, trumpet), and Osian Gwynedd (drums, keyboards). They initially recorded and sold home-recorded tapes, and released two seven-inch EPs as Beganifs, the first on their own label, the second on Ankst Records. They changed the band name to Big Leaves after they were mistakenly billed as this by a concert promoter in the Netherlands who misheard their name. They were signed by Crai Records, releasing two EPs in 1998 and 1999, and contributed to the second album by Catatonia, with whom they later toured. They also toured with Super Furry Animals, a band with which they have been compared. "Sly Alibi", released in 1999 on Adam Walton's Whipcord label, was the band's first English-language release. Their 1999 single "Racing Birds" was so highly regarded by BBC Radio 1 DJ Mark Radcliffe that he played it twice in a row on his show. The band's debut album, Pwy Sy'n Galw? (Who's Calling?) was released in 2000, after which they were joined by drummer Matt Hobbs. The band performed at the South by Southwest festival in Austin, Texas in 2002, and were featured in a documentary on S4C.

They released a second album in 2003, after which the band split up. Meilir and Osian Gwynedd later formed Sibrydion.

== Discography ==
=== Albums ===
- Pwy Sy'n Galw? (2000), Sain
- Alien & Familiar (2003), Dell'Orso

=== Singles, EPs ===
- Llygaid Gwyder EP (1997), self-released – as Beganifs
- Ffraeth EP (1997), Ankst – as Beganifs
- Trwmgwsg EP (1998), Crai
- Belinda EP (1999), Crai
- "Sly Alibi" (1999), Whipcord
- "Racing Birds" (1999), Whipcord
- Fine EP (2000), Metropolis
- Animal Instinct EP (2001), Dell'Orso
- "Electro-Magnetic Pollution" (2001), Boobytrap (part of the label's Singles Club)
- "Speakeasy" (2002), Dell'Orso
- Siglo EP (2002), Crai
