= Dancefloor (song) =

Single by The Holloways

from the album So, this is Great Britain?
- Released: 26 March 2007
- Studio: Kore Studios; Miloco Studios
- Length: 3:55
- Label: TVT Records
- Songwriters: Alfie Jackson, Bryn Fowler, Robert Skipper, and Dave Danger
- Producers: Clive Langer, Alan Winstanley

The Holloways singles chronology
"Generator" (2006)	"Dancefloor" (2007)	"Generator (Re-release)" (2007)

"Dancefloor" is the third single from the North London indie group The Holloways. It was released on 26 March 2007 on TVT Records and debuted at No. 41 in the UK singles chart. The B-side to the single, "Up the Junction", is a cover of Squeeze's 1979 song.

The song was included on The Holloways' 2006 debut album So This is Great Britain?.

== Reception ==
Norman Records' review stated that the song was a "pretty bland commercial indie pop that does little in the way of entertaining."

Spin's David Peisner states "On the charging, anthemic "Dancefloor", co-frontman Alfie Jackson dissects a night out clubbing in withering emotional detail.

NME states "Like an octogenarian boxer coming out for one last fight, The Holloways serve up the sweaty chips after the disappointment of each of their songs that isn’t "Generator". It’s still the same night-on-the-tiles larks."

Popmatters described it as being "infectious, Futureheads-meets-The Clash".

== Track listing ==
=== 7" vinyl single ===
1. "Dancefloor" - 3:55
2. "Up the Junction" - 2:59

=== CD maxi-single ===
1. "Dancefloor" - 3:55
2. "Your Fragrance Was Worn by an Ex of Mine" - 3:12
3. "Hatred and Anger" - 2:20
