= No Smoke, No Mirrors =

Studio album by The Holloways
- Released: 5 October 2009
- Genre: Alternative/Indie rock
- Label: The Orchard (UK)

The Holloways chronology
So This is Great Britain? (2006)	'''No Smoke, No Mirrors''' (2009)

No Smoke, No Mirrors is British band The Holloways' second studio album, released on 5 October 2009. It includes the single "Jukebox Sunshine" which was released prior to the album on 28 September 2009. It was greeted with mixed reviews including a poor review from NME and a positive review from IndieLondon. One journalist named it Pop Album of the Year.

== Track listing ==
1. "AAA" (3:21)
2. "Public Service Broadcast" (3:02)
3. "On the Bus" (3:02)
4. "Jukebox Sunshine" (2:29)
5. "Sinners 'n' Winners" (3:02)
6. "Under a Cloud" (2:45)
7. "Cool Down" (2:58)
8. "Alcohol" (2:45)
9. "Listen" (3:36)
10. "Little Johnny Went to Parliament" (3:11)
11. "Knock Me Down" (4:55)
