= Anni Llŷn =

Welsh-language author and TV presenter

- Born: 1 April 1988 (age 38); Sarn Mellteyrn, near Pwllheli, north Wales
- Occupations: Author and poet; presenter
- Known for: Children's Poet (laureate) for Wales 2015–2017

Annie Llŷn is a Welsh-language poet, author and presenter. She was Children's Poet (laureate) for Wales 2015–2017.

Llŷn was born and raised on a sheep and cattle farm in the village of Sarn Mellteyrn on the Llŷn peninsula in North Wales. She attended Ysgol Gynradd Pont y Gof and Ysgol Uwchradd Botwnnog and then studied Welsh at Cardiff University, followed by a post-graduate course in creative writing. In 2012 she won the Crown (main prize) for prose at the Urdd National Eisteddfod on the theme of plant shoots (egin). She was the Children's Poet (laureate) for Wales (Bardd Plant Cymru) 2015–2017.

Adventure novels for children and young adults written by Llŷn have been published including Asiant A (Agent A) and Nanw a Caradog Crafog Llwyd Lloerig as well as writing and co-writing books in the Cyw series as well as writing for children's TV programmes. She has also written novels for adults such as The Treasure of Garn Fadryn (Trysor Garn Fadryn).

She has was a presenter of the children's programmes Stwnsh on S4C for many years and has appeared on other television programmes.

She is married to the presenter Tudur Phillips and they have two children together. They have lived in Pen Llŷn since 2019.
