= Question The Mark =

Welsh punk rock band

- Also known as: QtM
- Origin: Cardiff, Wales
- Genres: Gruff-punk, punk rock, pub rock
- Years active: 2009–present
- Labels: Little Rocket Records, Paper & Plastick UK, Team Beard Records, Make That A Take Records, Seven Records, Exhume Industries
- Members: Tim 'Bunky' Davies; Rob Pascoe; Rich James; Lew
- Past members: Daniel 'Yogi' Young; Josh 'BT' Brunt-Torjussen; James Tiley; Bryn Feasey; Dai Hughes; Ross Goldworthy
- Website: www.questionthemark.co.uk

Question The Mark are a Welsh punk rock band from Cardiff, Wales. The band have released three EPs, Tearing Our Arms Off Through (2009), Smoke Signals (2012) and Nightmare On Misery Street (2018), one studio album, Idle Hands released in 2010, one official compilation album, 1096 Days Later released in 2012 and one 4 way compilation EP, Roaster released in 2013.

== History ==
The band formed in 2009, composed of vocalist/guitarist & lyricist Tim 'Bunky' Davies, guitarist/backing vocalist Sparky, bassist BT and drummer Dai Hughes. Their first show was in Swansea supporting the US punk band Bridge And Tunnel on April 21, 2009.

Their debut 7-inch, Tearing Our Arms Off Through, was released on Exhume Industries in 2009. produced by Todd Campbell at Skwad studios in Wales. Following live dates around the UK drummer Dai Hughes left the band to be replaced with Bryn Feasey.

In 2010, prior to recording the band's debut album, guitarist Sparky left the band to move to Australia and was replaced by Evil Turkey's guitarist Daniel 'Yogi' Young. Idle Hands was released on Seven Records the following year, produced once again by Todd Campbell at Skwad Studios in Wales.

Towards the end of 2011, the group recruited drummer James Tilley to replace the departed Bryn Feasey and embarked on a series of shows across the UK before starting work on their next release. The EP Smoke Signals was written between December 2011 & February 2012 and recorded at Jamtown Studios in Bridgend, South Wales in April 2012 and released on Team Beard Records in July the same year to coincide with the band's first European tour. Bassist Ross Goldworthy was drafted in for the tour due to BT's university commitments.

Upon returning to the UK the band returned to Jamtown to record two new tracks which were originally intended for a split 7-inch with the Scottish band Uniforms whom the band had toured with in 2011 but the project grew into a four-way split release 10-inch featuring two more Scottish bands - The Walking Targets and Sink Alaska.

During 2013 the band completed several short UK tours, however bassist BT's commitments to university and his other band Pipedream saw Ross Goldworthy fill in on many of these dates. In November 2013, the Roaster 10-inch EP was released by Make That A Take records and Team Beard records. Drummer James Tiley left the band at the end of 2013 which caused a period of hiatus during 2014, during which the band were missed by many and hailed as one of the UK's most under-rated bands.

In July 2014, the band were reunited with Bryn Feasey on drums and new bassist Rich James for a one-off show with US punk supergroup The Implants.

With a new tour planned for November 2014, the band started rehearsals with Not Since The Accident drummer Lewis filling in for the once again departed Bryn Feasey. The band then toured across the UK with Italian band Low Derive and US band Smoke Or Fire frontman Joe McMahon.

During 2015, the band played sporadic shows across the UK whilst working on their second album with a demo version of a new track called 'Perk U Later' appearing on a compilation released by the US based Paper & Plastick records to announce the opening of a European branch of the label.

Another unreleased track 'Pulling A Fast One' was released on the 'Book Yer Ane Fest IX' compilation released by Make That A Take Records in November 2015. The band played the annual charity music festival Book Yer Ane Fest held in Dundee, Scotland for the fourth consecutive year.

During November and into December 2017, Question the Mark toured across the UK with a new guitarist, Rob Pascoe. Whilst in Scotland, the band played 3 sets over 2 days at Book Yer Ane Fest XI in Dundee and held in different venues across the city.

Following sporadic shows across the UK during the early stages of 2018, Question The Mark joined up with Northern Irish band Lost Avenue in July for an 8-day tour of the UK, which included an appearance at the annual Skate Aid 5 festival in Stamford, Lincs. In October 2018, the band played their first US dates in Florida with shows in St. Petersburg & Tallahassee prior to their appearance at Fest 17 in Gainesville. Following their return to the UK, Sunderland based record label Little Rocket Records announced the signing of the band and the impending release of a new 7-inch featuring the band's new line up, which had been recorded at The Bunker studios in Sunderland earlier in the year by ex-Leatherface bassist Graeme Philliskirk to coincide with a 10 date UK tour in November / December. The dates with Chicago-based Canadian Rifle would include two sets at the 10th annual charity festival Book Yer Ane Fest in Dundee (Question The Mark re-released the track 'Whatgoesaroundcomesaround' for a benefit compilation album released by the festival organisers Make That A Take Records) and their first hometown show in Cardiff for over 6 months.

=== Current members ===
- Tim 'Bunky' Davies — Lead vocals, guitar (2009–present),
- Rob Pascoe — Lead guitar, backing vocals (2017–present)
- Rich James — Bass guitar, backing vocals (2014–present)
- Lewis — Drums (2014–present)

=== Former members ===
- Daniel 'Yogi' Young — Lead guitar, backing vocals (2010–2017)
- Josh 'BT' Brunt-Torjussen — Bass guitar, backing vocals (2009–2014)
- Ross Goldworthy — Bass guitar (2013–2014)
- James Tilley — Drums (2012–2013)
- Bryn Feasey — Drums (2010–2012) & (2014)
- Dai Hughes — Drums (2009–2010)

== Discography ==
- Breaking Our Arms Off Through (7-inch EP) (2009) (Exhume Industries)
- Idle Hands (LP) (2011) (Seven Records)
- 1096 Days & Counting (EP) (2012) (Team Beard Records)
- Smoke Signals (EP) (2012) (Team Beard Records)
- Roaster (EP) (2012) (Make That A Take Records / Team Beard Records)
- Nightmare On Misery Street (7-inch EP) (2018) (Little Rocket Records)

== Compilations ==
- In Transit (2011) (Seven Records)
- Make Yer Ane Comp (2011) (Make That A Take Records)
- Book Yer Ane Fest VI (2012) (Make That A Take Records)
- Offbeat & Underground Vol. 1 (2012) (Renegade Sounds)
- Don't Panic vol.1 (2012) (No Panic Records)
- Make Yer Ane Comp IV (2013) (Make That A Take Records)
- Fucking The Nation Everyday Vol. 5 (2013) (Punk Rockers Radio)
- Book Yer Ane Fest VII (2013) (Make That A Take Records)
- Dae Yer Ane Sampler (2013) (Make That A Take Records)
- Make Yer Ane Comp V (2014) (Make That A Take Records)
- Book Yer Ane Fest IX (2015) (Make That A Take Records)
- Welcome To The UK (2015) (Paper & Plastick / Already Heard)
- Full Moon Rising (2017) (Team Beard Records)
- Book Yer Ane Fest XII (2018) (Make That A Take Records)
