= Swiss Lips =

English electropop band

- Origin: Manchester, England
- Genres: Electropop
- Years active: 2011–2015
- Label: Sony Music Foreverever / BMG
- Members: Sam Hammond (vocals); Tim Estherby (keyboards); Luke Daniel (guitar); Nic Kozubik (drums); Tom White (bass)
- Website: www.swisslips.com

Swiss Lips were a five-piece electropop band from Manchester.

== Musical career ==
The band describe their sound as influenced by the Manchester music scene in some ways but display a wide range of influences. "Finding the middle ground between guitar music and dance music has been something Manchester has always been good at, and we hope to carry on that tradition." They draw inspiration from a wide-ranging array of artists: "...we take influences from all kinds of music. At the moment we are listening to Prince, Sebastian, Def Leppard, The Weeknd, The Beach Boys, Joe Goddard."

== History ==
=== Early years (2011-13) ===
Swiss Lips signed a four-album deal with Epic Sony at the end of 2011.

As a new band they were asked how it felt to be signed to a major record label, the band were able to point out that while Swiss Lips are a new band, they themselves are not novices to the music industry. "We are a new band but have all been playing in different bands for as long as we can remember so it doesn't seem like an overnight thing. It's feels amazing to have the support and belief of a team like Epic behind what we are doing and being Michael Jackson's label mates is something to brag to girls about."

NME said "Think Foster The People with the stylish pop-perfection poise of Franz" when describing the band.

Shortly after signing a deal with Sony Music, in March 2012 Swiss Lips became BBC Radio 1’s introducing act, where their debut track "U Got The Power" was played every day on Radio 1 for a week.

In August the band were featured on Channel 4's 4play, where they performed "U Got the Power", "Books" and "Danz".

Swiss Lips played a number of festivals and other gigs including Camden Crawl, The Great Escape Festival and Dot to Dot Festival, Lovebox and Live at Leeds festivals in 2012.

Swiss Lips supported Bastille on nine dates of their sold out UK tour, including a show at Koko in Camden. The band then went on to support Ladyhawke on her Blue Eyes UK tour

=== The Union ===
In November 2012 the band moved from their home in Manchester to The Union in East London, for a month. Throughout the month Swiss Lips held several free gigs for their fans and were joined by Bastille, The Horrors, Seasfire, DJ Mr Paul, Lois & The Love, YADi and Fenech Soler.

=== First success (2013-14) ===
In January 2013 Swiss Lips released a cover of Frank Ocean's track "Lost", as a free download. The cover was received well online, gaining over 90,000 views on YouTube and Nylon said "If 2012 was the year of Frank Ocean, then 2013 might just be the year of Swiss Lips."

In February the band released their first official single, "Danz". The track received support from BBC Radio 1 earning a daytime play from Sara Cox. The Guardian said "...it's hard not to indulge in light toe-tapping once Danz gets into full swing. Mixing elements of MGMT, Friendly Fires and The Rapture it shifts from percussive verses to a sky-scraping chorus." Also in February the band joined Neon Trees on tour in Manchester, Glasgow and London.

Swiss Lips released their second official single, "U Got the Power", on 28 April 2013. The track again won the support of Radio 1 as Scott Mills named it his Record of the Week. "U Got the Power" has been remixed by Silverclub, Monsieur Adi and Bastille. Gigwise said "...the Bastille remix is a mellow take on one of the coolest pop tracks of the year so far..." The video for "U Got The Power" went viral collecting over one million hits within the first five days of upload.

In late 2013, the band went on tour with Bastille for a second time, playing to sold out audiences throughout the UK.

It was shortly after this tour that the band started to have troubles with their label Sony Epic and fought to get out of the deal.

=== Swiss Lips and Overflowing Futures (2015) ===
In late 2014, the band finally were able to cut their ties with Sony Music and signed a new deal with Foreverever / BMG.

On 6 February 2015, Swiss Lips announced via Twitter that they were going to release their self-titled album, Swiss Lips, on 16 March 2015. On 16 March 2015, the album was released to critical acclaim for digital download and on vinyl, but there was no physical CD release. A video for "Books" was released as Q Magazine's "Track of The Day" on 3 March 2015, directed by Charlie Leek.

The announced their breakup on 17 August 2015 citing "the thing we loved the most became a drag, it's pretty gruesome out there for a small band in 2015". The band members are believed to be working on new projects individually. They also announced that they were to release their second album, Overflowing Futures, on 21 August.

On 21 August 2015, Swiss Lips released their second and final album, Overflowing Futures. The album was released for digital download only. The song "Got It Bad" from the album was Clash Magazine's "track of the day".

Former frontman Sam Hammond announced his solo project Neverlander in 2017 and the debut single "Reptiles" was released on 11 January 2018 on Swedish label Birds Records.

== Discography ==
List of albums, with year released
Title	Album details
Swiss Lips	Released: 16 March 2015; Format: Vinyl, Digital download
Overflowing Futures	Released: 21 August 2015; Format: Digital download

== Notable live appearances ==
- Fuji Rock Festival (July 2012)
- Converse: Represent (August 2012)
- Boardmasters (August 2012)
- The 100 Club, supporting Blur (August 2012)
- KOKO, supporting Bastille (October 2012)
- HMV Forum, supporting Ladyhawke (November 2012)
