= Who's Molly? =

Indie rock band

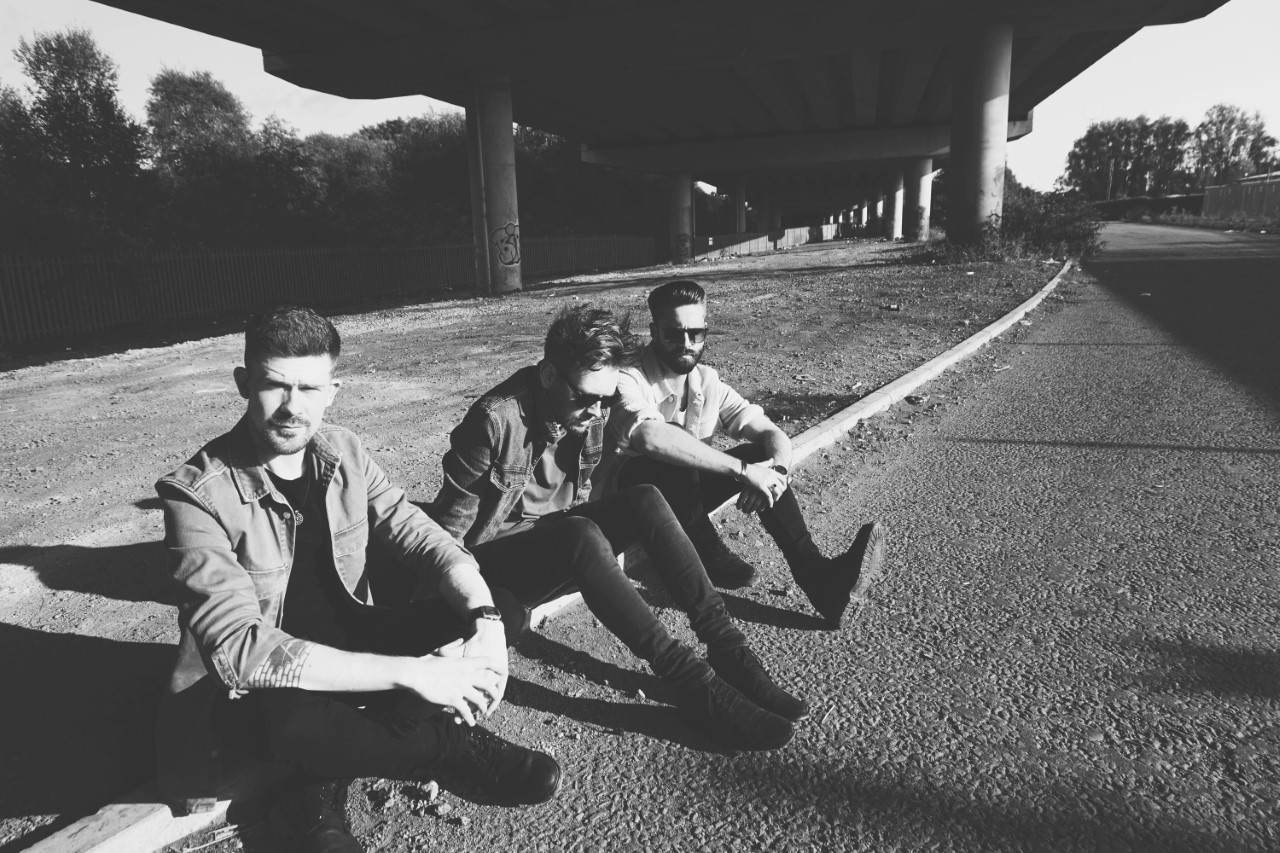

Background information
- Origin: Swansea, Wales
- Genres: Indie rock, Alternative rock
- Years active: 2018–present
- Label: Independent
- Members: Karl Morgan; Matt Williams; Rhys Morgan (Live); Huw Jenkins (Live); Damien Handley (Live); Lucas Taylor (Live)
- Website: www.whosmolly.com

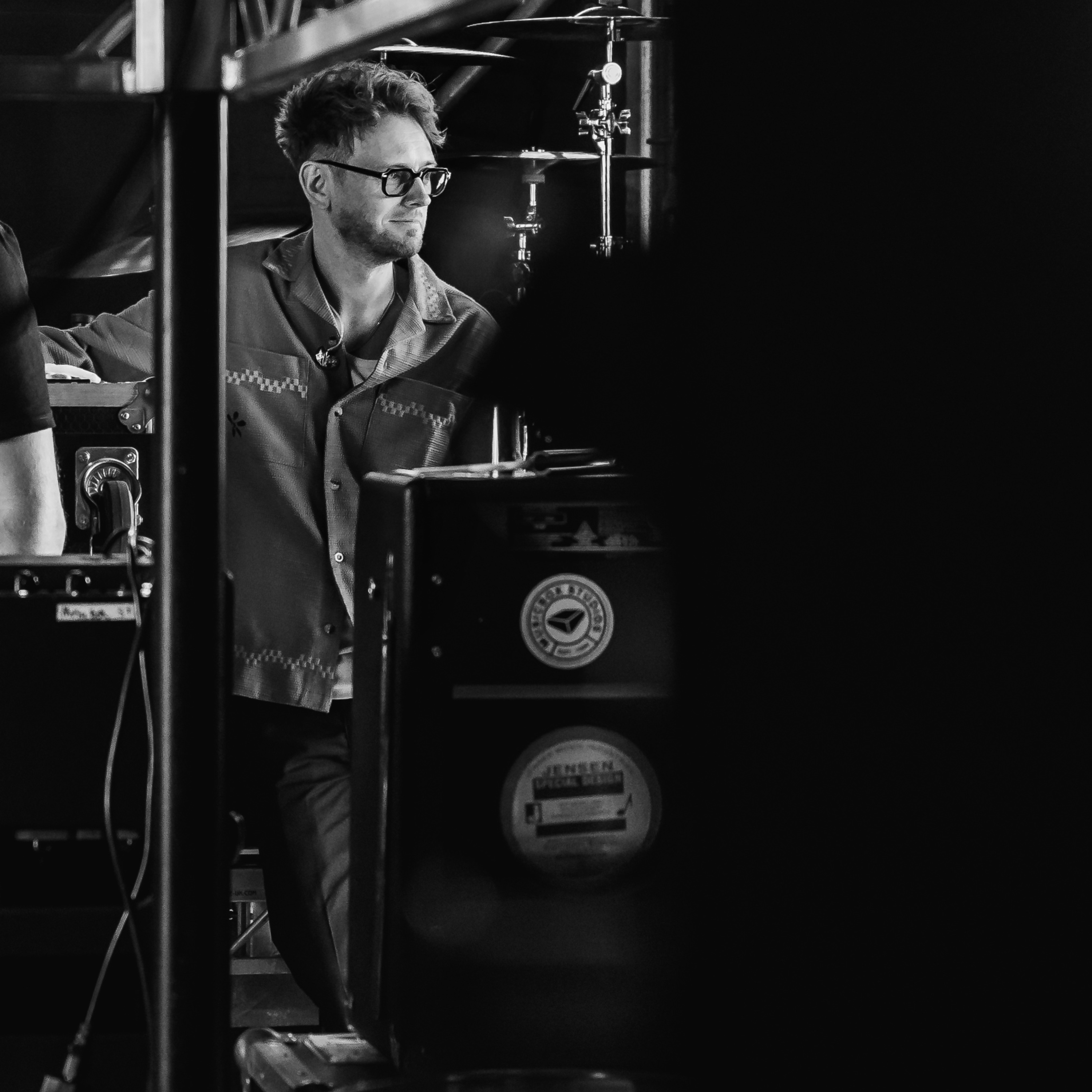

Who's Molly? are an indie rock band originating from Swansea, Wales. Started by lead singer and writer Karl Morgan (vocals, guitar, writer), with friends Matt Williams (guitar), Rhys Morgan (drums) after playing in various different groups around the South Wales music scene.

The band have released three EPs and four singles with several tracks used on TV as well as a global movie trailer for the Tom Cruise motion picture American Made. Who's Molly? have supported Jess Glynne, George Ezra and opened both North and South CarFest after being championed by Chris Evans on Virgin Radio.

== Origins ==
The origin of the band's name, "Who's Molly?" has been the subject of some speculation and rumour since the band formed. A common theory was that the name came from a line in one of Karl Morgan's favourite Beatles songs ("Ob-La-Di, Ob-La-Da"), however, in an interview with Laura Whitmore on BBC Radio 5 Live in June 2019, Morgan revealed that the band was actually named after an online stalker from Instagram.

== Career ==
The band released their first EP, "New Tomorrow" in April 2017, consisting of four tracks co-written and produced by Karl Morgan & Pete Woodroffe (best known for his work with Def Leppard). The track, "Touch the Sky" was used by the International Olympic Committee as the music for their "Best of Rio 2016" video, achieving over one million views. The title track was also used by Sky Sports during their coverage of The Masters golf tournament.

In March 2017, the follow-up EP, Welcome to the Good Life was released, again containing four tracks. The title track was featured in a trailer for the Tom Cruise motion picture American Made. Another track from the EP, "Top of the World" is used by YouTuber bambinobecky as the outro for her videos, helping to drive over 400,000 streams of the song on Spotify.

The third EP, entitled Fame, followed in February 2018. The track "Fire in My Soul" was used by BT Sport during their Champions League coverage.

Championed by DJ Janice Long, Who's Molly? performed on her "Biggest Weekend Build-up" show on BBC Wales in May 2018, and again on the BBC introducing Biggest Weekend Show on BBC Radio 1.

In August 2018, the track "The Moment" (released as a standalone single earlier in July) was used as the official anthem for the European Athletics Championships and was broadcast to an estimated global audience of 1.2 billion.

During the summer of 2018, the band performed at both CarFest North and South in aid of the BBC Children in Need charity. Later that year in November, the band performed "Welcome to the Good Life" at the Welsh BAFTA awards, introduced by BBC Radio 1 DJ Huw Stephens.

Around the same time, band member Karl Morgan began collaborating with Jamie Morrison of the Stereophonics on new material set for release in 2022. A cover of The Pretenders track Don't Get Me Wrong was debuted by the pair in August 2018.

Who's Molly? released two new singles in May and June 2019. "About Last Night" and "Until I Found You", which charted at number 45 in the Spanish chart with over 10,000 streams in its first week of release. It has now been streamed over a million times on Spotify (As of October 2021).

Who's Molly? won "Best Band", "Best Live Act" and "Best Single" for "Until I Found You" at the 2019 Soundboard awards.

"Dead Man Walking", the band's third single of 2019, was released on 8 November 2019 and added to the BBC Radio Wales A list, and used on promos for EA Games Battlefield.

"Girls and Boys", the band's first single of 2020 was released on 20 March.

In 2021 Who's Molly? have had their songs used on TV & online commercials for "Becks" / "OralB" / "Mini" / "Ford" & "Cornetto".

Releasing three new tracks while the music industry found some sort of normality. "Wasted" (July 2021) which was again added to BBC & Virgin Radio playlists, "You got me like" which was used on the Oral B worldwide commercial and "Feels good to me" (August 2021) which coincided with a Becks Lager commercial in Romania.

Lead singer Karl Morgan wrote the Korean hit 'Youth' for Kpop superstar Kihyun. Charting at number one on iTunes in 9 countries, and selling over 180,000 physical copies. Karl is also writing with UK Eurovision and TikTok sensation Sam Ryder for Sams new album as well as Stereophonics Jamie Morrison. Who's Molly are also supporting Sam at Singleton Park Swansea (18 August 2023)

According to an interview at the 2023 in it together festival with YouTuber Bambino Becky the band are set to release new music in August 2023.

Who's Molly? released their latest single 'Victoria' August 2023. Written by lead singer Karl and recorded by the band at their home studio in Wales. They debut the song while supporting Eurovision superstar Sam Ryder at Singleton Park Swansea. It was given its first play on BBC Radio2 breakfast on 20 August. Victoria also received 3 weeks Alist on @BBCRadioWales

According to the bands instagram they have new music dropping on June 20th 2025, titles Night Driver. As well as opening for UK chart toppers Busted & McFly.

In 2026 they opened for Aitch & Snow Patrol at In it together festival. According to their official website they have new a new EP coming out on August 21st.

== Discography ==
=== EPs ===
- New Tomorrow (2017)
- Welcome to the Good Life (2017)
- Fame (2018)

=== Singles ===
- "The Moment" (July 2018)
- "About Last Night" (May 2019)
- "Until I Found You" (June 2019)
- "Dead Man Walking" (November 2019)
- "Girls and Boys" (March 2020)
- "Wasted" (July 2021)
- "You got me like" (July 2021)
- "Feels good to me" (August 2021)
- "Victoria" (August 2023)
- "Night Driver" (June 2025)
- "Elephant" (August 2026)
- "Missing You" (September 2026)
- "Power" (October 2026)
