= Sibrydion =

- Origin: Waunfawr, Wales
- Genres: Indie rock
- Years active: 2004–present
- Members: Meilir Gwynedd; Osian Gwynedd; Dan Lawrence; Rhys Roberts; Dafydd Nant

Sibrydion (Welsh pronunciation: [sɪbˈrədjɔn]) are a band based in Cardiff, originally from Waunfawr in north Wales, formed by brothers Osian (keyboards) and Meilir Gwynedd (vocals, guitar), formerly in the band Big Leaves.

== History ==
The band's name translates into English as 'Whispers' or 'Rumours'. The band played their first concert at the National Eisteddfod in 2004. They went on to record a session for C2 and their song "Dafad Du" was used as the theme to the S4C music programme Bandit.

Their first album, JigCal, was released in 2005 by the Rasal label.

By 2007, the band became larger to vary their live sound, and these are the members at present: Meilir Gwynedd (vocals, guitar), Osian Gwynedd (keyboards), Dan Lawrence (guitar), Rhys Roberts (bass) (also a member of Anweledig), and Dafydd Nant (drums, also a member of BOB.) Their second album, Simsalabim was launched at the National Eisteddfod in 2007, on the Copa label. Third album Campfire Classics was released in 2009, their first English-language album, produced by Cian Ciaran of Super Furry Animals (a band which they have received several comparisons). The album received a four-star review from the Sunday Times, and was described as "a playful, melodic masterpiece" by the Daily Express, who also gave it 4/5.

== Awards ==
- JigCal won the Best Album Award in the 2006 BBC Radio Cymru Rock and Pop Awards.
- Best Welsh Language Act, Pop Factory Awards, 2007.

== Discography ==
- JigCal (2005), Rasal
- Simsalabim (2007), Copa
- Campfire Classics (2009), Dell'Orso
- Uwchben Y Drefn (2011), JigCal
