= The Holloways =

English indie rock band

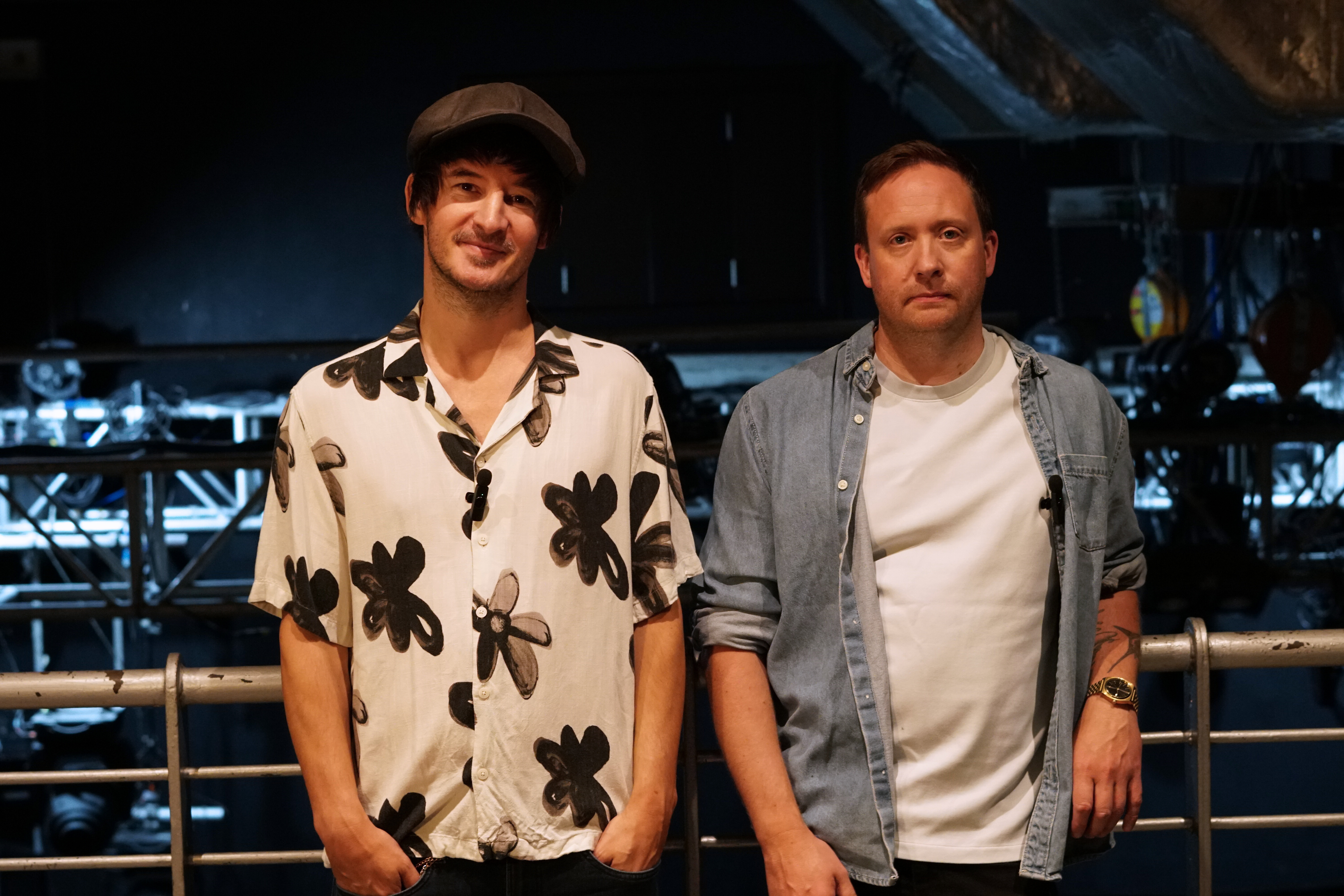
- The Holloways band members, Alfie Jackson (left) and Bryn Fowler (right) in 2025.

Background information
- Origin: England
- Genres: Indie rock
- Years active: 2004–2011, 2017–present
- Label: The Orchard (UK)
- Members: David 'Alfie' Jackson; Bryn Fowler
- Past members: Robb Skipper; Dave Danger; Edwin Harris; Mike Baker; Drew Wale

The Holloways are an English indie rock band from North London. Their single "Generator" reached number 14 in the UK Singles Chart on 11 June 2007. They have had five No. 1 singles on the UK Indie Chart and several Top 40 singles. Their debut album, So This Is Great Britain?, was awarded an 8 out of 10 by NME.

== History ==
=== Formation ===
David 'Alfie' Jackson and Bryn Fowler established the band, meeting Rob Skipper at the music venue Nambucca on Holloway Road in North London. Jackson, Fowler, and Skipper jammed together, playing in a room above the venue belonging to Dave Danger. During the session, Jackson, Fowler, and Skipper completed six songs. It was at this point that Dave Danger joined the band.

=== So This Is Great Britain? and mainstream success (2007-2008) ===
The Holloways toured with Babyshambles, The Pogues, The Kooks, The Rakes, The Wombats, The Pigeon Detectives and CSS.

=== No Smoke, No Mirrors, breakup, death of Skipper (2009–2014) ===
In 2010, Reservoir Media Management acquired 100% of the Holloways publishing assets, which had formerly been administered by TVT Music Enterprises, LLC.

The Holloways announced their breakup in 2011. They played their final show on 23 May 2011 at the Relentless Garage on Holloway Road in London. During the show, the band reunited with previous band members to play a 70-minute set of songs from throughout their career.

Former band member Robb Skipper died on 3 October 2014 in Brighton from a heroin overdose.

=== Recent activity (2015–present) ===
The band reunited in 2017.

The Holloways joined fellow "indie rock" bands The Enemy and The Subways for the "Indie Till I Die Tour" in 2024.

The Holloways will embark on a Comeback Tour in October 2025, playing in Norwich, London, Birmingham, Manchester and Grimsby.

== Side Projects ==
Various members of the band have started side projects while the band were broken up.

=== Hares ===
Founding member and lead guitarist went on to front the short-lived folk rock band Rob Skipper & The Musical Differences, and later fronted Hares. Skipper also played fiddle for The Urban Voodoo Machine and Jamie T.

=== Burning Beaches ===
Danger later performed with Burning Beaches alongside singer-songwriter and past Holloways guest Sam McCarthy.

=== Rusty Suns ===
Following the break up, Jackson formed The Rusty Suns with Tom Redburn, Simon Juniper & Alfredo Corrales, releasing the double-A side single 'Loco/Lover Not A Fighter' in 2014.

== Members ==
- David 'Alfie' Jackson – guitars, harmonica, vocals (2004–2011, 2017–present)
- Bryn Fowler – bass, backing vocals (2004–2011, 2017–present)
- Robert Skipper – guitars, fiddle, vocals (2004–2009)
- Dave Danger – drums, triangle (2004–2009, 2020)
- Edwin D Harris – drums (2009–2011)
- Mike Baker – guitar, backing vocals (2009–2011)
- Drew Wale - keys, vocals (2009-2011)

== Discography ==
=== Albums ===
- So This is Great Britain? (30 October 2006; special edition: 1 October 2007) No. 54 UK
- No Smoke, No Mirrors (5 October 2009)

=== EPs ===
- Sinners & Winners EP (2008)

=== Singles ===
- "Generator / Two Left Feet" (2005) Limited release
- "Happiness & Penniless" (2006) Limited release
- "Two Left Feet" (7 August 2006) No. 33 UK, No. 1 UK Independent chart
- "Generator" (16 October 2006) No. 30 UK, No. 1 UK Independent chart
- "Dancefloor" (26 March 2007) No. 41 UK, No. 1 UK Independent chart
- "Generator" (11 June 2007) No. 14 UK, No. 1 UK Independent chart
- "Two Left Feet" (2007) No. 74 UK, No. 1 UK Independent chart
- "Jukebox Sunshine" (2009) No. 4 UK Independent chart
