= Waunfawr =

Village and community in Gwynedd, Wales

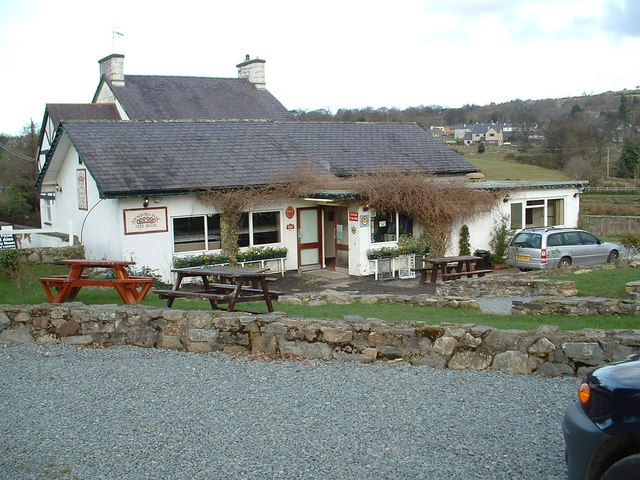
- Snowdonia Parc Inn, Waunfawr

- Location within Gwynedd
- Population: 1,261 (2016)
- OS grid reference: SH523593
- Community: Waunfawr
- Principal area: Gwynedd
- Country: Wales
- Sovereign state: United Kingdom
- Post town: Caernarfon
- Postcode district: LL55
- Dialling code: 0128
- Police: North Wales
- Fire: North Wales
- Ambulance: Welsh
- UK Parliament: Dwyfor Meirionnydd
- Senedd Cymru – Welsh Parliament: Arfon
- List of places UK Wales Gwynedd 53.111°N 4.206°W Map of the community

Waunfawr (gwaun + mawr, English: "large moorland/meadow") is a village and community, 4 miles (6.4 km) southeast of Caernarfon, in Gwynedd, Wales. It is located near Snowdonia (Eryri).

== Description ==
Waunfawr is in the Gwyrfai valley, on the A4085 road from Caernarfon to Beddgelert. It contains the Waunfawr railway station on the Welsh Highland Railway between Caernarfon and Porthmadog.

Waunfawr was historically part of the parish of Llanbeblig, which also included the borough of Caernarfon. The Local Government Act 1894 directed that parishes could no longer straddle borough boundaries, and so the part of the parish of Llanbeblig outside the borough of Caernarfon was made a separate parish called Waenfawr. The official spelling was changed from Waenfawr to Waunfawr in 1957. Rural parishes such as Waunfawr were converted into communities in 1974 under the Local Government Act 1972.

The community had a population of 1,427 at the 2011 census. According to the United Kingdom Census 2011, the percentage of Welsh language speakers above age 3 was 79.5%. This was a 1.4% increase since the previous census in 2001.

The ward had a population of 1,676 at the 2011 census, and includes Caeathro nearer to Caernarfon. as does the community.

The local landscape reflects the village name, with the nearby mountains such as Mynydd Mawr and Moel Eilio, with views of Snowdon, the highest mountain in Wales, possible from some locations. There are a number of tourist locations for camping in Waunfawr and there is the opportunity to enjoy trekking and other Snowdonia National Park activities such as canoeing and mountain climbing.

== Glan Gwna ==
Glan Gwna is a grade II* listed country house, which stands in the 200 acres (81 ha) Glan Gwna estate within the community of Waunfawr on the banks of the River Seiont. The estate is now the Glan Gwna Holiday Park.

In 1893 the estate was bought by the wealthy slate quarry owner John Ernest Greaves, who also owned Bron Eifion, near Criccieth. He knocked down the old hall and rebuilt it. On his death in 1945, Glan Gwna was left to his granddaughter Dorothy, who had married a cousin, William Flower of the brewing family, and the estate farms were subsequently sold. In the 1950s the estate was bought by a local businessman as a caravan park. During the 1970s, under new ownership, the estate became a holiday park, with 45 of the 200 acres (18 of the 81 hectares) dedicated to lodges, bungalows and cottages.

== Historical landmarks ==
The Marconi Company built a large high-powered longwave wireless telegraph transmitting station on the hilltop above the village in 1914 which worked in association with its receiving station at Tywyn. The station initiated commercial transatlantic wireless service from London to New York City in 1920. It replaced Marconi's transatlantic wireless service from Clifden, Ireland to Canada, after the Clifden station was destroyed in the Irish Civil War in 1922. The building was until recently used as a climbing centre called Beacon Climbing, which has since relocated to Caernarfon town.

There are many recreational facilities available in Waunfawr, from playing snooker to playing football on the all-weather pitch. There is also a youth club and a junior football club. The village has its own school teaching local children up to the age of 11, called Ysgol Waunfawr . The village has a number of interesting church buildings, some of them dating back over 150 years and possessing classic forms of masonry and architecture.

== Notable people from Waunfawr ==
- Big Leaves, Welsh language alternative rock band, members grew up in Waunfawr
- John Evans (1770–1799), born in Waunfawr and produced an early map of the Missouri River in North America
- William Henry Preece (1834–1913), engineer, pioneer in the development of the telephone, mentor to Guglielmo Marconi
- Griffith Williams (1769–1838), bardic pupil of Dafydd Ddu Eryri
- Owen Williams (1790–1874), antiquary and author of a Welsh dictionary
- Eurig Wyn (1944–2019), journalist and MEP politician

== Other information ==
Waunfawr is also the name of a village which now forms a northern suburb of Aberystwyth.
