= Anweledig =

Band from Blaenau Ffestiniog, Wales

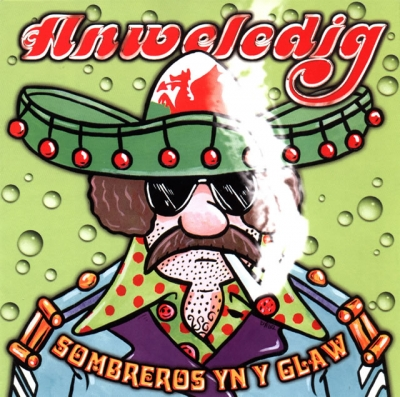

Background information
- Origin: Blaenau Ffestiniog
- Genres: Ska; Rock; Reggae; Funk
- Years active: 1992–2008, 2017–present
- Label: Crai
- Members: Ceri Cunnington; Gai Toms; Iwan 'Oz' Jones; Rhys Roberts; Alwyn Evans; Joe Buckley
- Past members: Michael Jones

Anweledig are a band from Blaenau Ffestiniog, Wales; their style is a mixture of funk, reggae, ska and rock. The band consists of Ceri Cunnington (vocals), Gai Toms (guitar/vocals), Iwan 'Oz' Jones (guitar), Rhys Roberts (bass guitar), Alwyn Evans (drums), Joe Buckley (keyboard), Edwin Humphreys (saxophone), Barri Gwilliam (trumpet) and Arwel Davies (trombone).

The band became popular in the Welsh-language music scene in 1998, following the release of their first album, Sombreros yn y Glaw (Sombreros in the Rain), on the Crai label. In 1994 they won both the Urdd and the National Eisteddfod best band awards. Since forming in 1991, the band have supported Yr Anhrefn, Super Furry Animals, Gorky's Zygotic Mynci, Stereophonics, Catatonia and Geraint Jarman. To coincide with their first album (Sombreros yn y Glaw), the band recorded a video for the i-Dot music programme on S4C, for the song "Fan Hyn" ("Right Here").

Toms also went on to form Mim Twm Llai, and was voted best composer at the 2002 and 2003 Radio Cymru awards. Roberts was also a member of Sibrydion, and later ran Cell, a recording studio, education centre and live music venue in Blaenau Ffestiniog.

Anweledig are still performing, recently doing a show at Llwyfan y Maes on 8 August, 2025.

== Band members ==
=== Current members ===
- Ceri Cunnington (lead vocal)
- Gai Toms (guitar, composition, vocal)
- Iwan 'Oz' Jones (front guitar)
- Rhys Roberts (bass guitar)
- Alwyn Evans (drums)
- Joe Buckley (keyboards)

=== Former members ===
- Michael Jones

== Discography ==
- Sombreros yn y Glaw (LP, 1998)
- Cae yn Nefyn (EP, 1999)
- "Scratchy" (single, 2000)
- Gweld y Llun (LP, 2001)
- "Low Alpine" (single, 2001)
- Byw (EP, 2004)
