= Generator (The Holloways song) =

Single by The Holloways

from the album So, this is Great Britain?
- Released: 16 October 2006; 11 June 2007 (re-release)
- Songwriter(s): Bryn Fowler, David Healy, David Jackson, Rob Skipper
- Producer(s): Clive Langer, Alan Winstanley

The Holloways singles chronology
"Two Left Feet" (2006)	"Generator" (2006)	"Dancefloor" (2007)
"Dancefloor" (2007)	"Generator" (2007)	"Two Left Feet" (2007)

"Generator" is the first, fourth and sixth single from the North London indie group The Holloways. The initial limited release wasn't chart eligible as it was only available from one shop on Holloway Road. The first re-release debuted at #89 in the UK Singles Chart. It was included in The Holloways' debut album So This is Great Britain?.

The song was performed by The Holloways on BBC Radio 1's Live Lounge. It was released on Radio 1's Live Lounge – Volume 2.

It was re-released again on 11 June 2007 and entered the UK Top 20 at #14, making it the band's highest-charting single. It had spent 12 non-consecutive weeks in the UK Top 100.

== Track listing ==
1. "Generator"
2. "All I Have To Do Is Dream"
3. "Pushing & Shoving"

Enhanced CD

1. "Generator"
2. "One Mad Kiss"
3. "The Many Very Merry"
4. "Generator" [Video]
