= Two Left Feet (song) =

Single by The Holloways

from the album So, this is Great Britain?
- Released: 7 August 2006; 24 September 2007
- Length: 3:01
- Label: TVT Records
- Songwriter(s): Bryn Fowler, David Healy, David Jackson, Rob Skipper
- Producer(s): Clive Langer, Alan Winstanley

The Holloways singles chronology
"Two Left Feet" (2006)	"Generator" (2006)
""Generator" (Re-release)" (2007)	""Two Left Feet" (Re-release)" (2007)

"Two Left Feet" is the first single from the North London indie group The Holloways. It was released on 7 August 2006 by TVT Records and debuted at #33 on the UK singles charts.

The B-side is a cover of Ray Charles' "Hallelujah I Love Her So". The song was included on The Holloways' 2006 debut album, So, this is Great Britain?.

It was re-released on 24 September 2007 but it was only to chart at #74 that time.

== Track listing ==
=== 7" single ===
1. "Two Left Feet" - 3:01
2. "Hallelujah I Love Her So" - 3:02

A limited edition 7" single, pressed on yellow vinyl, was also released with an alternative B-side, "Aspirin".

=== CD maxi single ===
1. "Two Left Feet" - 3:01
2. "London Town" -
3. "Sound of the Sunshine" -
