= Y Llais series 2 =

Y Llais
- Series 2
- Promotional poster featuring coaches Gwynedd, Scott, Terfel, and Lewis
- Hosted by: Sian Eleri
- Coaches: Sir Bryn Terfel; Bronwen Lewis; Aleighcia Scott; Yws Gwynedd
- No. of contestants: 32
- Winner: Carrie Sauce
- Winning coach: Sir Bryn Terfel
- Runners-up: Cas Jones; Chuts; Lywis

Release
- Original network: S4C; S4C Clic; BBC iPlayer
- Original release: 8 March – 26 April 2026

Series chronology
- ← Previous; Series 1

Y Llais (Welsh for The Voice) is a Welsh-language television music competition aimed at discovering new singing talent. The show was renewed for a second series, which began broadcasting on 8 March 2026 on S4C. Sian Eleri returned to present the series, while Sir Bryn Terfel, Bronwen Lewis, Aleighcia Scott, and Yws Gwynedd returned as coaches.

On 26 April 2026, drag artist Carrie Sauce was named winner, coached by Sir Bryn Terfel. Carrie Sauce was the first drag queen to win any of the series in The Voice franchise.

== Coaches and host ==
Coaches for series 2 of Y Llais

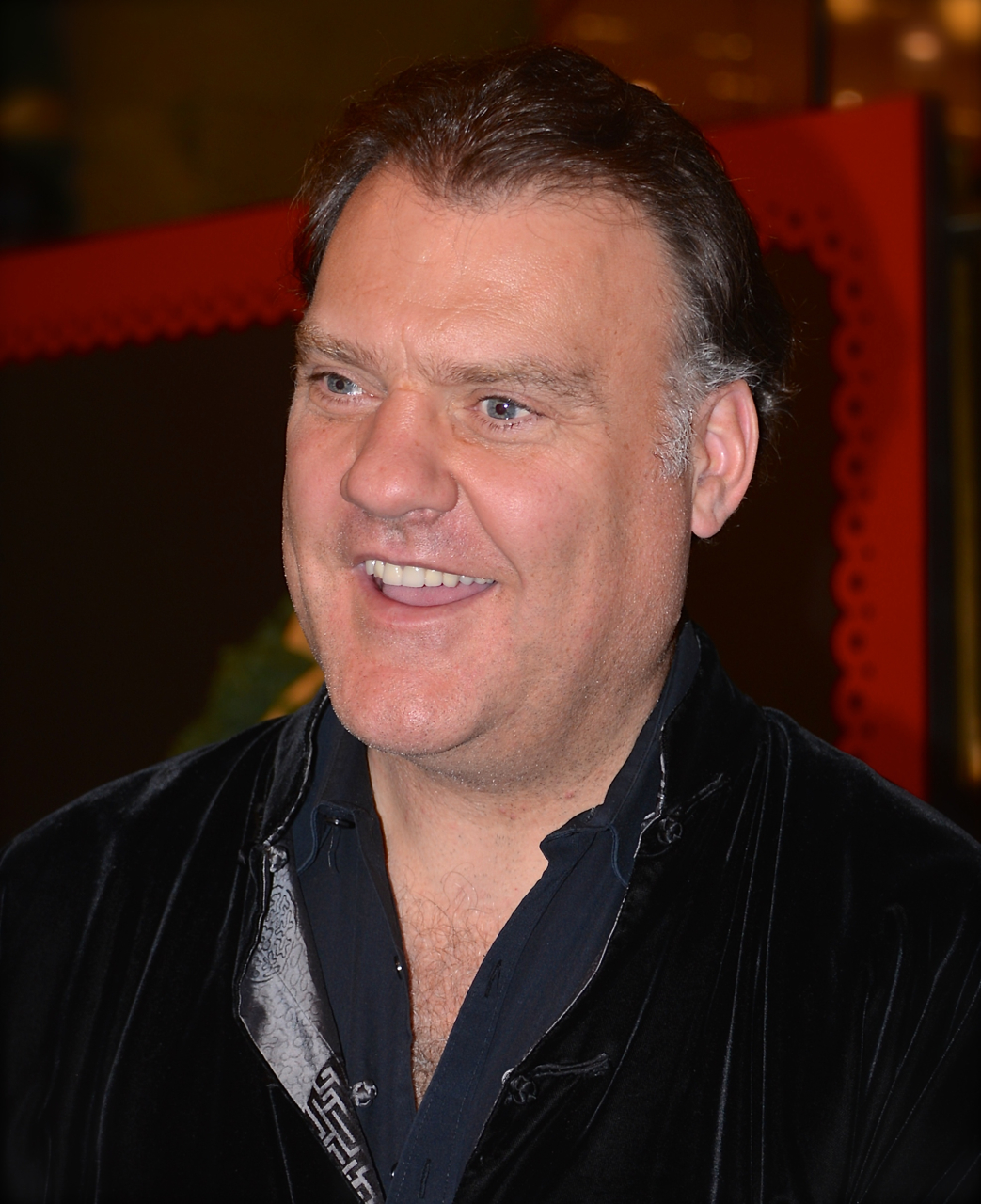
Sir Bryn Terfel

Bronwen Lewis

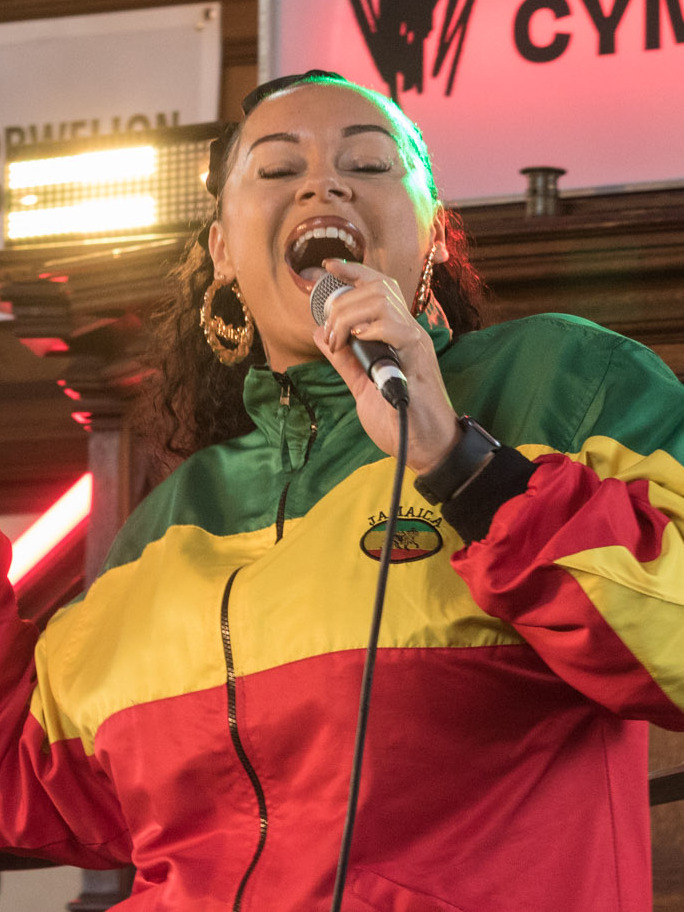
Aleighcia Scott

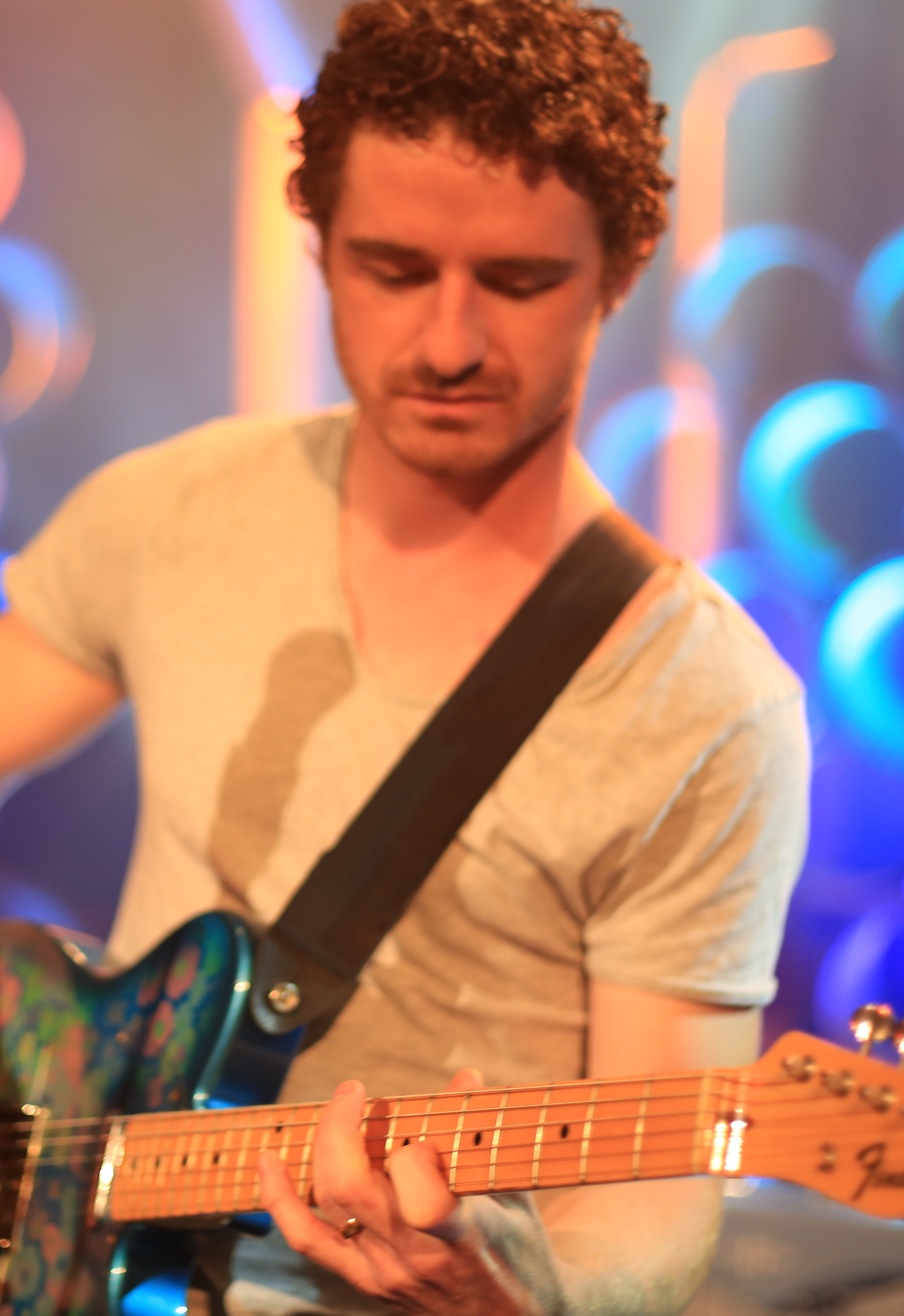
Yws Gwynedd

On 9 July 2025, S4C announced that all four coaches from the previous season, Sir Bryn Terfel, Bronwen Lewis, Aleighcia Scott, and Yws Gwynedd, would return for their second series. Sian Eleri returned from last season, to present the show.

== Production ==
S4C confirmed the renewal of Y Llais for a second series, with an announcement at the Urdd Eisteddfod in Margam Park on 28 May 2025. The show is again being produced by Boom Cymru, the same company behind the first series. The window for applications from prospective contestants opened on 9 July 2025 and closed on 18 July 2025. Filming was expected to begin later in 2025, with the show airing in early 2026 on S4C, S4C Clic, and BBC iPlayer.

== Teams ==
=== Colour key ===
- Winner
- Runner-up
- Eliminated in the Semi-Final
- Eliminated in the Callbacks

Coach	Top 32 Artists			
Sir Bryn Terfel				
Sir Bryn Terfel	Carrie Sauce	Harry Lloyd-Morgan	Jonathan Davies	Bryn Williams
Sir Bryn Terfel	Heather Dolly Jones	Jodana Weekly	Rhys Rowlands	Tara Camm
Bronwen Lewis				
Bronwen Lewis	Cas Jones	Grace Sanders	Mari Fflur Fychan	Chris Owen
Bronwen Lewis	Jonathan White	Maddie	Martyn Peters	Rhiannon
Aleighcia Scott				
Aleighcia Scott	Lywis	Katie Ruth	Ruth	Ceirios Haf
Aleighcia Scott	Emyr Wyn Williams	Erin Hair Williams	Garin Fitter	Melody
Yws Gwynedd				
Yws Gwynedd	Chuts	Keila Hughes	Ryan Rowe	Celyn Mair
Yws Gwynedd	Igloo Hearts	Jade Smith	Lily Maya Gittens	Siwan Mair Jones

== Blind auditions ==
The show began with the Blind Auditions on 8 March, 2026. In each audition, an artist sings their piece (in welsh) in front of the coaches, whose chairs face the audience. If a coach is interested in working with the artist, they may press their button to face the artist. If only one coach presses the button, the artist automatically becomes part of their team. If multiple coaches turn, they will compete for the artist, who will decide which team they will join. This season, each coach ends up with 8 artists by the end of the blind auditions, creating a total of 32 artists advancing to the callbacks.

Blind auditions colour key
✔	Coach pressed "I WANT YOU" button
	Artist defaulted to this coach's team
	Artist elected to join this coach's team
	Artist eliminated with no coach pressing their "I WANT YOU" button
	Artist received a "Four Chair Turn"

=== Episode 1 (8 March) ===
Order	Artist	Age	Song	Coaches and artists choices			
Order	Artist	Age	Song	Bryn	Bronwen	Aleighcia	Yws
1	Bryn Williams	34	"Iris"	✔	✔	✔	✔
2	Erin Hair Williams	30	"Y Reddf"	—	—	✔	—
3	Keila Hughes	19	"Dal Dig"	—	—	—	✔
4	Ryan Rowe	31	"Tutti Frutti"	✔	✔	—	✔
5	Ethan Mei	27	"Dancing in the Moonlight"	—	—	—	—
6	Jodana Weekly	38	"Rhywun Yn Rhywle"	✔	—	—	—
7	Elin Mai	37	"Mai"	—	—	—	—
8	Carrie Sauce	31	"Rise Like a Phoenix"	✔	✔	✔	✔
9	Cat Southall	47	"Saf Ar Dy Draedd"	—	—	—	—
10	Ruth	—N/a	"Tennessee Whiskey"	—	✔	✔	—
11	Cas Jones	32	"I Will Always Love You"	✔	✔	✔	✔

=== Episode 2 (15 March) ===
Order	Artist	Age	Song	Coaches and artists choices			
Order	Artist	Age	Song	Bryn	Bronwen	Aleighcia	Yws
1	Lywis	29	"Crazy"	✔	—	✔	✔
2	Mari Fflur Fychan	19	"Pe Bawn i’n Rhydd"	✔	✔	—	—
3	Jacob Lewis	30	"Esgair Llyn"	—	—	—	—
4	Katie Ruth	42	"I Want You Back"	—	✔	✔	✔
5	Jonathan	31	"Disgyn"	—	✔	✔	—
6	Yingzi Song	—N/a	"Cymru Fach"	—	—	—	—
7	Rhys Rowlands	21	"Rhedeg I Paris"	✔	—	—	—
8	Carys Gwen	—N/a	"Gadael Abertawe"	—	—	—	—
9	Igloo Hearts	—N/a	"Brig Y Nos"	—	—	—	✔
10	Chris Owen	43	"Show Me Heaven"	—	✔	—	—
11	Rhiannon	35	"Nessun Dorma"	—	✔	✔	✔

=== Episode 3 (22 March) ===
Order	Artist	Age	Song	Coaches and artists choices			
Order	Artist	Age	Song	Bryn	Bronwen	Aleighcia	Yws
1	Maddie	—N/a	"Miliwn"	—	✔	✔	—
2	Celyn Mair	25	"Mwynen Merch"	—	—	—	✔
3	Martyn Peters	39	"Hiraeth" (original song)	—	✔	—	—
4	Harry Lloyd-Morgan	23	"Pink Pony Club"	✔	—	—	—
5	Grace Perry	32	"Nutbush City Limits"	—	—	—	—
6	Siwan Mair Jones	24	"Gwenwyn"	—	—	—	✔
7	Josef Gray	22	"Lisa Lân"	—	—	—	—
8	Lily Maya Gittens	26	"Meillionen"	—	—	—	✔
9	Ceirios Haf	37	"Llwybr Lawr I’r Dyffryn"	✔	—	✔	—
10	Keys	25	"Ein Gwlad"	—	—	—	—
11	Tara Camm	26	"The Prayer"	✔	✔	✔	✔

=== Episode 4 (29 March) ===
Order	Artist	Age	Song	Coaches and artists choices			
Order	Artist	Age	Song	Bryn	Bronwen	Aleighcia	Yws
1	Jonathan Davies	45	"Ti a Dy Ddoniau"	✔	✔	✔	✔
2	Chuts	28	"Y Bardd o Montreal"	—	✔	✔	✔
3	Garin Fitter	29	"Sherry"	—	—	✔	—
4	Laura Sutton	43	"Stop!"	—	—	—	—
5	Emyr Wyn Williams	43	"WAW"	—	—	✔	✔
6	Jade Smith	34	"Cloriau Cudd"	—	—	✔	✔
7	Melody	—N/a	"Runaway Baby"	—	—	✔	Team Full
8	Dylan Heddwyn Williams	72	"Y Cwm"	—	—	Team Full	Team Full
9	Heather Dolly Jones	20	"Traitor"	✔	—	Team Full	Team Full
10	Saskia Mapp	20	"Synfyfyrio"	Team Full	—	Team Full	Team Full
11	Grace Sanders	36	"Black Velvet"	Team Full	✔	Team Full	Team Full

== The Callbacks ==
The second stage of the competition is "The Callbacks". In this round, each coach's team will be narrowed down from eight contestants to three. The contestants perform a selected song, and their coach determines whether they are deserving of a place in the Semi-Finals.

Each coach had an advisor to aid in their decision. Team Bryn had Catty, Team Bronwen had Ian "H" Watkins, Team Aleighcia had Caryl Parry Jones, and Team Yws had Mali Hâf.

Callbacks color key
Artist advanced to the Semi-Finals
Artist was eliminated

Callbacks Results
Episode	Order	Coach	Artist	Song
Episode 5 (5 April)	1	Yws	Siwan Mair	"Neidia"
Episode 5 (5 April)	1	Yws	Keila May	"Neidia"
Episode 5 (5 April)	1	Yws	Celyn Mair	"Neidia"
Episode 5 (5 April)	1	Yws	Chuts	"Neidia"
Episode 5 (5 April)	2	Yws	Ryan Rowe	"Dros Foroedd Gwyllt"
Episode 5 (5 April)	2	Yws	Igloo Hearts	"Dros Foroedd Gwyllt"
Episode 5 (5 April)	2	Yws	Jade Smith	"Dros Foroedd Gwyllt"
Episode 5 (5 April)	2	Yws	Lily Maya Gittens	"Dros Foroedd Gwyllt"
Episode 5 (5 April)	1	Aleighcia	Erin Hair Williams	"Wade in the Water"
Episode 5 (5 April)	1	Aleighcia	Melody	"Wade in the Water"
Episode 5 (5 April)	1	Aleighcia	Ruth	"Wade in the Water"
Episode 5 (5 April)	1	Aleighcia	Katie Ruth	"Wade in the Water"
Episode 5 (5 April)	2	Aleighcia	Garin Fitter	"Caerdydd"
Episode 5 (5 April)	2	Aleighcia	Ceirios Haf	"Caerdydd"
Episode 5 (5 April)	2	Aleighcia	Emyr Wyn Williams	"Caerdydd"
Episode 5 (5 April)	2	Aleighcia	Lywis	"Caerdydd"
Episode 6 (12 April)	1	Bryn	Bryn Williams	"Bring Him Home"
Episode 6 (12 April)	1	Bryn	Tara Camm	"Bring Him Home"
Episode 6 (12 April)	1	Bryn	Heather Dolly Jones	"Bring Him Home"
Episode 6 (12 April)	1	Bryn	Carrie Sauce	"Bring Him Home"
Episode 6 (12 April)	2	Bryn	Harri Lloyd-Morgan	"Goleuadau Llundain"
Episode 6 (12 April)	2	Bryn	Jodana	"Goleuadau Llundain"
Episode 6 (12 April)	2	Bryn	Rhys Rowlands	"Goleuadau Llundain"
Episode 6 (12 April)	2	Bryn	Jonathan Davies	"Goleuadau Llundain"
Episode 6 (12 April)	1	Bronwen	Maddie	"Llosgi"
Episode 6 (12 April)	1	Bronwen	Martyn Peters	"Llosgi"
Episode 6 (12 April)	1	Bronwen	Mari Fflur Fychan	"Llosgi"
Episode 6 (12 April)	1	Bronwen	Jonathan White	"Llosgi"
Episode 6 (12 April)	2	Bronwen	Grace Sanders	"One For Sorrow"
Episode 6 (12 April)	2	Bronwen	Chris Owen	"One For Sorrow"
Episode 6 (12 April)	2	Bronwen	Rhiannon	"One For Sorrow"
Episode 6 (12 April)	2	Bronwen	Cas Jones	"One For Sorrow"

== Show details ==
=== Results summary ===
Colour key

Team Bryn
Team Bronwen
Team Aleighcia
Team Yws

Result's colour key
Artist received the most public votes
Artist was eliminated

Weekly results
Contestant	Week 1	Week 2
Carrie Sauce	Safe	Winner
Cas Jones	Safe	Finalist
Chuts	Safe	Finalist
Lywis	Safe	Finalist
Grace Sanders	Eliminated	Eliminated (Week 1)
Harri Lloyd-Morgan	Eliminated	Eliminated (Week 1)
Jonathan Davies	Eliminated	Eliminated (Week 1)
Katie Ruth	Eliminated	Eliminated (Week 1)
Keila May	Eliminated	Eliminated (Week 1)
Mari Fflur-Fychan	Eliminated	Eliminated (Week 1)
Ruth	Eliminated	Eliminated (Week 1)
Ryan Rowe	Eliminated	Eliminated (Week 1)

=== Week 1: Semi-final (19 April) ===
The Semi-final aired on 19 April 2026. The 12 contestants who advanced from the Callbacks competed, with each coach having to select one artist out of three to take through to the final.

Performances in the semi-final episode
Episode	Order	Coach	Artist	Song	Result
Episode 7 (19 April)	1	Yws Gwynedd	Ryan Rowe	"Sigla Dy Dîn"	Eliminated
Episode 7 (19 April)	2	Yws Gwynedd	Keila May	"Adar y Nefoedd"	Eliminated
Episode 7 (19 April)	3	Yws Gwynedd	Chuts	"Llwytha’r Gwn"	Saved
Episode 7 (19 April)	4	Aleighcia Scott	Lywis	"Rho i Mi Ween"	Saved
Episode 7 (19 April)	5	Aleighcia Scott	Ruth	"Yr Un Hen Ddyn"	Eliminated
Episode 7 (19 April)	6	Aleighcia Scott	Katie Ruth	"Human"	Eliminated
Episode 7 (19 April)	7	Sir Bryn Terfel	Jonathan Davies	"Rhywbeth O’i Le"	Eliminated
Episode 7 (19 April)	8	Sir Bryn Terfel	Harri Lloyd-Morgan	"Tri O’r Gloch Y Bore"	Eliminated
Episode 7 (19 April)	9	Sir Bryn Terfel	Carrie Sauce	"Believe"	Saved
Episode 7 (19 April)	10	Bronwen Lewis	Grace Sanders	"Don't Kill My Vibe"	Eliminated
Episode 7 (19 April)	11	Bronwen Lewis	Mari Fflur-Fychan	"Eto"	Eliminated
Episode 7 (19 April)	12	Bronwen Lewis	Cas Jones	"From This Moment On"	Saved

=== Week 2: Final (26 April) ===
The season finale aired on 26 April 2026. The top four contestants who advanced from the semifinals performed a solo song, followed by a duet with their respective coach.

At the end of the episode, the winner was announced following a vote by the live audience.

Carrie Sauce, the alter-ego of 31 year old Oliver Martin, was the first drag queen to win a series in any of The Voice franchises.

Performances in the final episode
Order	Coach	Artist	Solo song	Order	Duet (with Coach)	Result
1	Aleighcia Scott	Lywis	"Black and Gold"	5	"Halfway"	Finalist
2	Bronwen Lewis	Cas Jones	"Listen"	6	"Hwylio Drwy’r Nen"	Finalist
3	Yws Gwynedd	Chuts	"Hardd"	7	"Dihoeni"	Finalist
4	Sir Bryn Terfel	Carrie Sauce	"Cyn I’r Llenni Gau"	8	"Time to Say Goodbye"	Winner

Non-competition performances
Order	Performers	Song
8.1	Finalists	"Aros Amdanat Ti"
8.2	Rose Datta	"Gwerthfawr"
