= Y Llais series 1 =

Welsh television music competition

Y Llais
- Series 1
- Hosted by: Sian Eleri
- Coaches: Bryn Terfel; Bronwen Lewis; Aleighcia Scott; Yws Gwynedd
- No. of contestants: 32
- Winner: Rose Datta
- Winning coach: Aleighcia Scott
- Runners-up: Anna Arrieta; Liam J Edwards; Sara Owen

Release
- Original network: S4C; BBC iPlayer
- Original release: 9 February – 30 March 2025

Series chronology
- Next → Series 2

Y Llais (Welsh for The Voice) is a Welsh television music competition aimed at discovering new singing talent. The first series premiered on 9 February 2025, on S4C and BBC iPlayer. Sian Eleri served as the host for this series. The coaches for the season were Sir Bryn Terfel, Bronwen Lewis, Aleighcia Scott, and Yws Gwynedd, each seated in their respective chairs.

On 30 March 2025, Rose Datta was named winner, coached by Aleighcia Scott.

== Overview ==
Coaches for series 1 of Y Llais

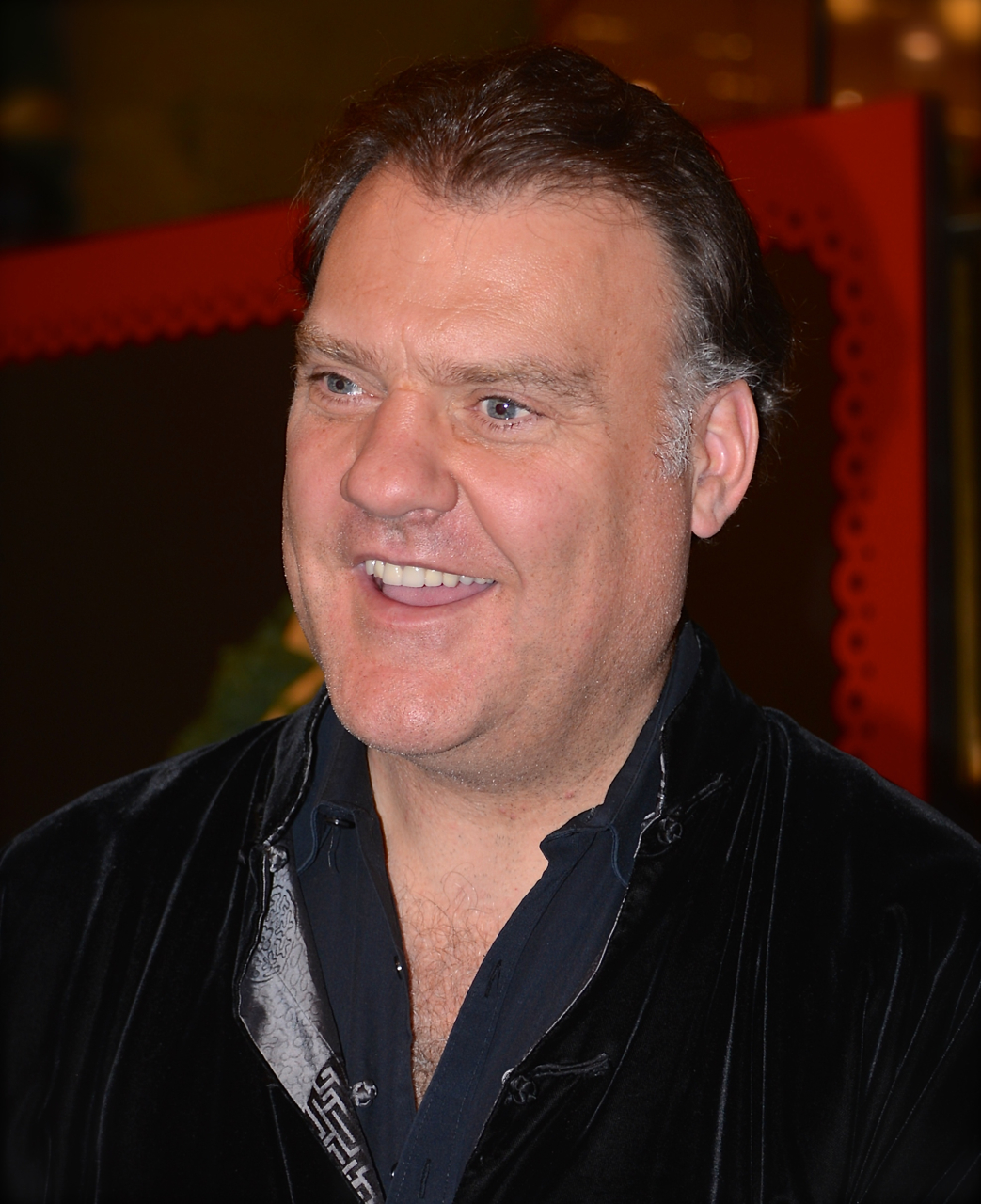
Sir Bryn Terfel

Bronwen Lewis

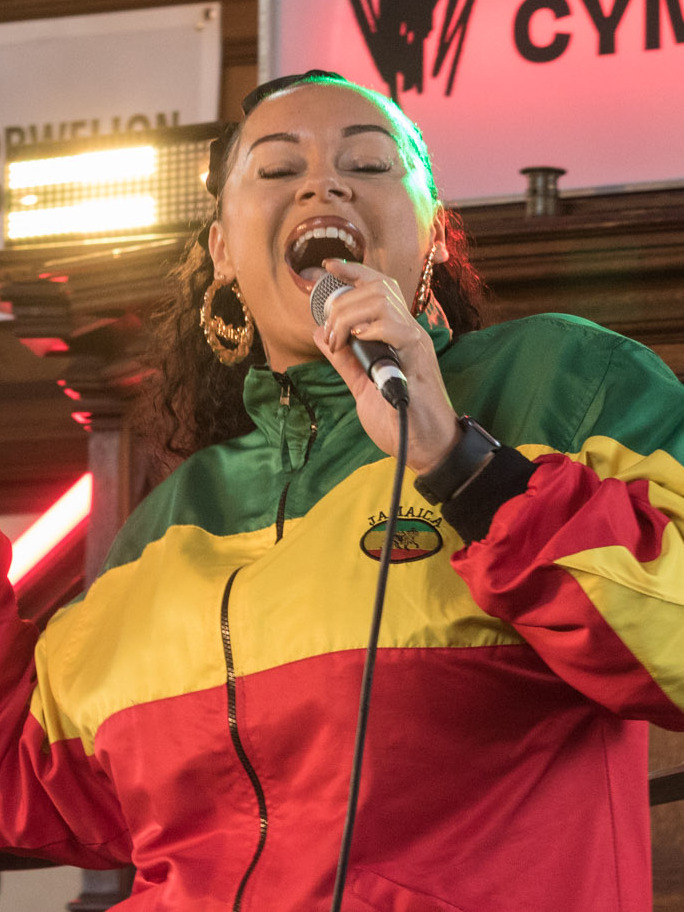
Aleighcia Scott

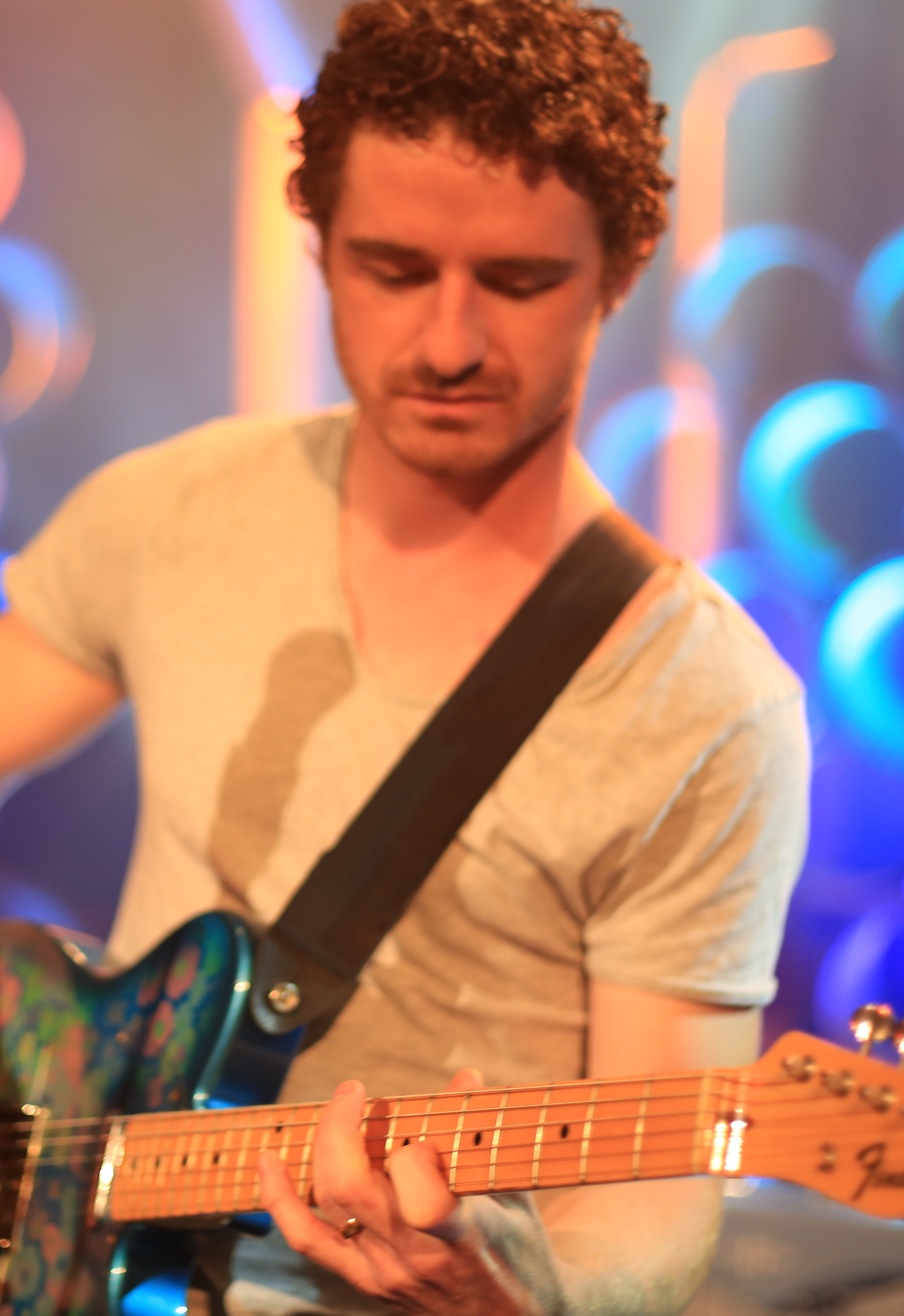
Yws Gwynedd

On 2 May 2024, it was announced that Wales would receive its own version of The Voice UK, set to premiere in 2025. The show, produced by Boom Cymru, will debut on S4C.

=== Coaches and host ===
The first series was hosted by Radio 1 DJ Sian Eleri. On 6 February 2025, the full lineup of the series was announced, featuring opera singer Sir Bryn Terfel, reggae star Aleighcia Scott, musician and Côsh record label owner Yws Gwynedd, and singer-songwriter Bronwen Lewis, who had previously competed on The Voice UK.

== Teams ==
=== Colour key ===
- Winner
- Runner-up
- Eliminated in the Semi-Final
- Eliminated in the Callbacks

Coach	Top 32 Artists			
Sir Bryn Terfel				
Sir Bryn Terfel	Sara Owen	Nia Tyler	Megan Haf Davies	Eiriana Jones Campbell
Sir Bryn Terfel	Sophie Roxanne	Twm Tudor	Sioned Llewelyn	Nerys Haf Evans
Bronwen Lewis				
Bronwen Lewis	Liam J Edwards	Emma Winter	Elys Davies	Rhiannon O'Connor
Bronwen Lewis	Jodi Bird	Hanna Seirian Evans	Abi Lewis	Michael Simmonds Dickens
Aleighcia Scott				
Aleighcia Scott	Rose Datta	SJ & Endaf	Lauren Fisher	Kelly Hastings
Aleighcia Scott	Ruby Meredith	Gwenan Roberts	Amelia Evans	Kat Rees
Yws Gwynedd				
Yws Gwynedd	Anna Arrieta	Stephen Hallwood	Bethany Powell	Celyn Lewis
Yws Gwynedd	Rhosyn Boyce-Jones	Harry Luke	Gary ‘Ragsy’ Ryland	Cara Braia

== Blind auditions ==
The show commenced with the Blind Auditions on 9 February 2025. During each audition, an artist performs while the coaches face away from them, with their chairs turned toward the audience. If a coach wishes to mentor the artist, they press a button to turn their chair and face the performer. If only one coach turns, the artist automatically joins their team. However, if multiple coaches turn, they compete for the artist, who then chooses which team to join. By the end of the Blind Auditions, each coach selects eight artists, resulting in a total of 32 contestants advancing to the next stage. The coaches opened the series with a joint performance of O Wales.

Blind auditions colour key
✔	Coach pressed "I WANT YOU" button
	Artist defaulted to this coach's team
	Artist elected to join this coach's team
	Artist eliminated with no coach pressing their "I WANT YOU" button
	Artist received an "All Turn"

=== Episode 1 (9 February) ===
- Coach performance: "O Wales"

Order	Artist	Age	Song	Coaches and artists choices			
Order	Artist	Age	Song	Bryn	Bronwen	Aleighcia	Yws
1	Sara Owen	35	"I'm With You"	✔	✔	✔	✔
2	Eiriana Jones Campbell	21	"This Will Be (An Everlasting Love)"	✔	✔	✔	✔
3	Stephen Hallwood	43	"International Velvet"	—	—	✔	✔
4	Alaw Thomas	23	"Before He Cheats"	—	—	—	—
5	Sophie Roxanne	30	"Ugain Mlynedd Yn Ôl"	✔	—	—	—
6	SJ & Endaf	29 & 33	"Phone Booth"	—	—	✔	—
7	Rhiannon O'Connor	35	"Awen"	—	✔	✔	✔
8	Leigh Alexandra Woolford	40	"Dim Gair"	—	—	—	—
9	Celyn Lewis	18	"Chwarae Dy Gêm"	—	—	✔	✔
10	Katie Ruth	41	"Dacw 'Nghariad"	—	—	—	—
11	Emma Winter	32	"Ti A Fi"	✔	✔	✔	✔

=== Episode 2 (16 February) ===
Order	Artist	Age	Song	Coaches and artists choices			
Order	Artist	Age	Song	Bryn	Bronwen	Aleighcia	Yws
1	Bethany Powell	30	"Alone"	✔	✔	✔	✔
2	Twm Tudor	20	"To Where Are You"	✔	✔	✔	—
3	Nia Tyler	25	"Something's Got A Hold On Me"	✔	✔	✔	✔
4	Cara Braia	32	"Llygad Ebrill"	—	—	—	✔
5	Liam J Edwards	22	"Yma o Hyd"	✔	✔	✔	✔
6	Anna Likeman	20	"At Last"	—	—	—	—
7	Kelly Hastings	43	"What Was I Made For?"	—	—	✔	✔
8	Sioned Llewelyn	29	"Ave Maria"	✔	—	—	✔
9	Meilir ap Emrys	21	"Byw i'r Funud"	—	—	—	—
10	Rose Datta	18	"A Natural Woman"	✔	✔	✔	✔
11	Jodi Bird	26	"Mamma Knows Best"	✔	✔	✔	✔

=== Episode 3 (23 February) ===
Order	Artist	Age	Song	Coaches and artists choices			
Order	Artist	Age	Song	Bryn	Bronwen	Aleighcia	Yws
1	Hanna Seirian Evans	19	"Tri Mis a Diwrnod"	✔	✔	✔	✔
2	Michael Simmonds-Dickens	39	"Bler "	✔	✔	—	✔
3	Bethany Williams-Potter	28	"You and I"	—	—	—	—
4	Anna Arrieta	25	"Put Your Records On"	✔	—	—	✔
5	Ruby Meredith	18	"Who's Loving You"	—	✔	✔	—
6	Megan Haf Davies	21	"Harbwr Diogel"	✔	—	—	—
7	Harry Luke	23	"Adlewyrchiad"	—	—	—	✔
8	Gwenan Roberts	35	"Un Nos Ola Leuad"	—	—	✔	—
9	Idge Logan	40	"Pwyth"	—	—	—	—
10	Rosie Reed	20	"Good Luck Babe"	—	—	—	—
11	Abi Lewis	20	"Ar Lan y Môr"	✔	✔	✔	✔

=== Episode 4 (2 March) ===
Order	Artist	Age	Song	Coaches and artists choices			
Order	Artist	Age	Song	Bryn	Bronwen	Aleighcia	Yws
1	Amelia Evans	21	"Tri Mis a Diwrnod"	—	✔	✔	✔
2	Elys Davies	22	"Myfanwy"	✔	✔	✔	✔
3	Sera Boudreaux	30	"Llif yr Awr"	—	Team full	—	—
4	Kat Rees	27	"Misty"	—	Team full	✔	—
5	Eli Parsons	24	"Blodau yn y Glaw"	—	Team full	—	—
6	Lauren Fisher	21	"Nosi"	✔	Team full	✔	—
7	Celyn Stewart	20	"Vampire"	—	Team full	Team full	—
8	Gary ‘Ragsy’ Ryland	45	"Tŷ Coz"	✔	Team full	Team full	✔
9	Rhosyn Boyce-Jones	19	"Ti"	—	Team full	Team full	✔
10	Dyfan Parry Jones	24	"Gwlad y Delyn"	—	Team full	Team full	Team full
11	Nerys Haf Evans	33	"Gad Fi Ar Ben Fy Hun"	✔	Team full	Team full	Team full

== Callbacks ==
The second round is the "Callbacks". In this stage of the competition, each coach's team will be narrowed down from eight contestants to three. The contestants perform a selected song, and their coach determines whether they are deserving of a place in the Semi-Finals.

Additionally, each coach is allowed to bring a special guest mentor to help with their decision-making. The guest mentors for this season are Elin Fflur, Steffan Rhys Hughes, Trystan Llŷr Griffiths and Alys Williams for teams Bryn, Bronwen, Aleighcia, and Yws, respectively.

Callbacks color key
Artist advanced to the Semi-Finals
Artist was eliminated

Callbacks Results
Episode	Order	Coach	Winner	Loser	Song
Episode 5 (9 March)	1	Yws Gwynedd	Anna Arrieta	Cara Braia	"Yma"
Episode 5 (9 March)	1	Yws Gwynedd	Anna Arrieta	Celyn Lewis	"Yma"
Episode 5 (9 March)	1	Yws Gwynedd	Stephen Hallwood	Celyn Lewis	"Yma"
Episode 5 (9 March)	2	Yws Gwynedd	Bethany Powell	Celyn Lewis	"Ffawda Ffydd"
Episode 5 (9 March)	2	Yws Gwynedd	Bethany Powell	Gary ‘Ragsy’ Ryland	"Ffawda Ffydd"
Episode 5 (9 March)	2	Yws Gwynedd	Bethany Powell	Harry Luke	"Ffawda Ffydd"
Episode 5 (9 March)	2	Yws Gwynedd	Bethany Powell	Rhosyn Boyce-Jones	"Ffawda Ffydd"
Episode 5 (9 March)	1	Aleighcia Scott	Lauren Fisher	Amelia Evans	"Pontydd"
Episode 5 (9 March)	1	Aleighcia Scott	Lauren Fisher	Gwenan Roberts	"Pontydd"
Episode 5 (9 March)	1	Aleighcia Scott	Lauren Fisher	Kat Rees	"Pontydd"
Episode 5 (9 March)	2	Aleighcia Scott	Rose Datta	Kelly Hastings	"Rise Up"
Episode 5 (9 March)	2	Aleighcia Scott	SJ & Endaf	Ruby Meredith	"Rise Up"
Episode 6 (16 March)	1	Bronwen Lewis	Liam J Edwards	Hanna Seirian Evans	"Euphoria"
Episode 6 (16 March)	1	Bronwen Lewis	Liam J Edwards	Jodi Bird	"Euphoria"
Episode 6 (16 March)	1	Bronwen Lewis	Liam J Edwards	Rhiannon O'Connor	"Euphoria"
Episode 6 (16 March)	2	Bronwen Lewis	Elys Davies	Abi Lewis	"Anfonaf Angel"
Episode 6 (16 March)	2	Bronwen Lewis	Emma Winter	Michael Simmonds Dickens	"Anfonaf Angel"
Episode 6 (16 March)	1	Sir Bryn Terfel	Megan Haf Davies	Eiriana Jones Campbell	"Never Enough"
Episode 6 (16 March)	1	Sir Bryn Terfel	Megan Haf Davies	Twm Tudor	"Never Enough"
Episode 6 (16 March)	1	Sir Bryn Terfel	Megan Haf Davies	Sioned Llewelyn	"Never Enough"
Episode 6 (16 March)	2	Sir Bryn Terfel	Sara Owen	Nerys Haf Evans	"Aros"
Episode 6 (16 March)	2	Sir Bryn Terfel	Nia Tyler	Sophie Roxanne	"Aros"

== Show details ==
=== Results summary ===
Colour key

Team Bryn
Team Bronwen
Team Aleighcia
Team Yws

Result's colour key
Artist received the most public votes
Artist was eliminated

Weekly results
Contestant	Week 1	Week 2
Rose Datta	Safe	Winner
Anna Arrieta	Safe	Finalist
Liam J Edwards	Safe	Finalist
Sara Owen	Safe	Finalist
Bethany Powell	Eliminated	Eliminated (Week 1)
Elys Davies	Eliminated	Eliminated (Week 1)
Emma Winter	Eliminated	Eliminated (Week 1)
Lauren Fisher	Eliminated	Eliminated (Week 1)
Megan Haf Davies	Eliminated	Eliminated (Week 1)
Nia Tyler	Eliminated	Eliminated (Week 1)
SJ & Endaf	Eliminated	Eliminated (Week 1)
Stephen Hallwood	Eliminated	Eliminated (Week 1)

=== Week 1: Semi-final (23 March) ===
The Semi-Final aired on 23 March. The 12 contestants who advanced from The Recalls competed, with each coach selecting one artist from their team of three to advance to the Final.

Performances in the semi-final episode
Episode	Order	Coach	Artist	Song	Result
Episode 7 (23 March)	1	Bronwen Lewis	Liam J Edwards	"Chandelier"	Advanced
Episode 7 (23 March)	2	Bronwen Lewis	Emma Winter	"Nos Sul A Baglan Bay"	Eliminated
Episode 7 (23 March)	3	Bronwen Lewis	Elys Davies	"Mil O Gelwyddau"	Eliminated
Episode 7 (23 March)	4	Yws Gwynedd	Stephen Hallwood	"Cariad dros Chwant"	Eliminated
Episode 7 (23 March)	5	Yws Gwynedd	Anna Arrieta	"Treiddia'r Mur"	Advanced
Episode 7 (23 March)	6	Yws Gwynedd	Bethany Powell	"Teimlo"	Eliminated
Episode 7 (23 March)	7	Aleighcia Scott	SJ & Endaf	"Tŷ ar y Mynydd"	Eliminated
Episode 7 (23 March)	8	Aleighcia Scott	Rose Datta	"Signed, Sealed, Delivered I'm Yours"	Advanced
Episode 7 (23 March)	9	Aleighcia Scott	Lauren Fisher	"Love Song"	Eliminated
Episode 7 (23 March)	10	Sir Bryn Terfel	Nia Tyler	"Piece Of My Heart"	Eliminated
Episode 7 (23 March)	11	Sir Bryn Terfel	Megan Haf Davies	"Môr o Gariad"	Eliminated
Episode 7 (23 March)	12	Sir Bryn Terfel	Sara Owen	"Gorwedd Gyda'i Nerth"	Advanced

=== Week 2: Final (30 March) ===
The Final aired on 30 March. The 4 contestants who advanced from The Semi-Finals competed, to be crowned the winner. The episode commenced with all contestants performed "Uno Cydio Tanio" together. Additionally there was a guest performance from Mared Williams singing "Dal Fi'n Ol".

At the end of the show, Rose Datta was announced as the winner of the series.

Order	Coach	Artist	Solo Song	Order	Duet (with coach)	Result
1	Aleighcia Scott	Rose Datta	"Feeling Good"	7	"Ain't Nobody"	Winner
2	Sir Bryn Terfel	Sara Owen	"How Do I Live"	8	"Ysbryd Y Nos"	Finalist
3	Yws Gwynedd	Anna Arrieta	"Pan Fyddai'n 80 Oed"	9	"Pan Ddaw Yfory"	Finalist
4	Bronwen Lewis	Liam J Edwards	"Adre"	10	"She Used to Be Mine"	Finalist
