= Y Llais =

Welsh-language singing television series

- Genre: Reality competition
- Created by: John de Mol; Roel van Velzen
- Presented by: Sian Eleri
- Judges: Sir Bryn Terfel; Bronwen Lewis; Aleighcia Scott; Yws Gwynedd
- Countries of origin: Wales, United Kingdom
- Original languages: Welsh (English subtitles)
- No. of series: 2
- No. of episodes: 16

Production
- Production location: Dragon International Film Studios
- Running time: 60–120 minutes
- Production companies: S4C, Boom Cymru and ITV Studios

Original release
- Network: S4C
- Release: 9 February 2025 – present

Related
- The Voice (franchise); The Voice UK

Y Llais (Welsh for 'The Voice') is a Welsh-language singing reality competition television series. It premiered on S4C on 9 February 2025. Based on the original Dutch singing competition The Voice of Holland and part of The Voice franchise, it has aired two series and aims to find currently unsigned singing talent (solo or duets) contested by aspiring singers, drawn from public auditions. The show was originally presented by Sian Eleri.Steffan Powell will become the new presenter from 2027 onwards. The winners receive the opportunity to record and release a professionally produced single, along with industry exposure and support from established Welsh artists and producers. The winners of each series have been: Rose Datta and Carrie Sauce.

The series employs a panel of four coaches who critique the artists' performances and guide their teams of selected artists through the remainder of the series. They also compete to ensure that their act wins the competition, thus making them the winning coach. The current features Sir Bryn Terfel, Bronwen Lewis, Aleighcia Scott and Yws Gwynedd.

In 2024, WalesOnline confirmed that the first series of the Welsh-language edition of The Voice was in production. Y Llais is produced by Boom Cymru, a subsidiary of ITV Studios. The first season aired on 9 February 2025. Filming for the third series will begin in late November 2026.

== Format ==
Y Llais is a reality television series that features four coaches looking for a talented new artist, who could become a global superstar. The show's concept is indicated by its title: the coaches do not judge the artists by their looks, personalities, stage presence or dance routines—only their vocal ability. It is this aspect that differentiates The Voice from other reality television series such as The X Factor, Britain's Got Talent or even Pop Idol. The competitors are split into four teams, which are mentored by the coaches who in turn choose songs for their artists to perform. There is no specific age range and anyone can audition; if a coach likes what they hear, a button-press allows their chair to spin around and face the performer, signifying that they would like to mentor them. If more than one does so, then the artist selects a coach. However, if no coach turns around then the artist is sent home.

There are three different stages: producers' auditions, Blind auditions, Callbacks and the final rounds.

=== Blind auditions ===
The first stage is the blind auditions, where they sing in front of the coaches. The coaches have their backs to the singer, and if they like what they hear, they can press their button to turn around and recruit them to their team. If more than one coach turns, the power shifts to the singer, who then decides which team they would like to be part of. Each coach must recruit a number of singers (8 in series 1 onwards) to their team in the blind auditions to progress on to the next round.

=== Callbacks ===
The second stage of the competition is the 'Callbacks'. The four coaches are all assisted by guest mentors to help make their decisions. They all have their eight acts from the 'Blind Auditions'. From here, the artists are put into a group of four where they will all take individual turns to perform the same song – given to them by their coach. After all the other artists perform, they come together & their coach then picks 3 artists from other groups to advance to the semi-final, leaving each coach with 3 semi-finalists. In total, 12 artists advance to the semi-final, eliminating 28 acts during the process.

=== Final rounds ===
The final rounds feature the semi-finals and the final. To this day, they are yet to be contested live. The semi-finals feature 12 artists, and each coach selects one artist to advance to the final. In the final, the remaining artists perform again to compete for the title of Y Llais winner.

=== Language policy ===
Unlike versions of The Voice in other territories, all songs performed in the Welsh edition are sung in the Welsh language. However, these do not have to be originally Welsh-language songs, as performances may include translations from English or other languages.

Some contestants are not fluent Welsh speakers, and limited use of English occurs in interactions with them. One of the coaches, Aleighcia Scott, was also learning Welsh at the time of the series and had been studying the language for two years.

The programme attracted contestants from across Wales with varying levels of Welsh-language fluency and a wide range of musical styles. Singer Yws Gwynedd described the discovery of "incredible new talent" during the auditions as a "huge shock", noting in an interview on BBC Radio Cymru that he had expected to be familiar with most participants, but was surprised by the number of previously unknown performers.

== Series overview ==
Y Llais series overview
Season	Aired	Winner	Runners-up			Winning coach	Presenter	Coaches (chairs' order)			
Season	Aired	Winner	Runners-up			Winning coach	Presenter	1	2	3	4
1	2025	Rose Datta	Anna Arrieta	Liam J Edwards	Sara Owen	Aleighcia Scott	Sian Eleri	Bryn	Bronwen	Aleighcia	Yws
2	2026	Carrie Sauce	Cas Jones	Chuts	Lywis	Sir Bryn Terfel	Sian Eleri	Bryn	Bronwen	Aleighcia	Yws
3	2027	Upcoming series					Steffan Powell	Bryn	Bronwen	Aleighcia	Yws

== Coaches and hosts ==
On 2 May 2024, international opera singer Sir Bryn Terfel was the first confirmed coach, he said "It’s great that the land of song is getting its own special version of The Voice series – what better way to discover the next big star?" On 6 February 2025, the last three coaches were announced, they featured reggae star Aleighcia Scott, musician and owner of Côsh record label Yws Gwynedd, and singer and songwriter Bronwen Lewis, who also previously competed on The Voice UK. All four coaches were confirmed to return for the following two seasons.

=== Gallery ===
Coaches gallery

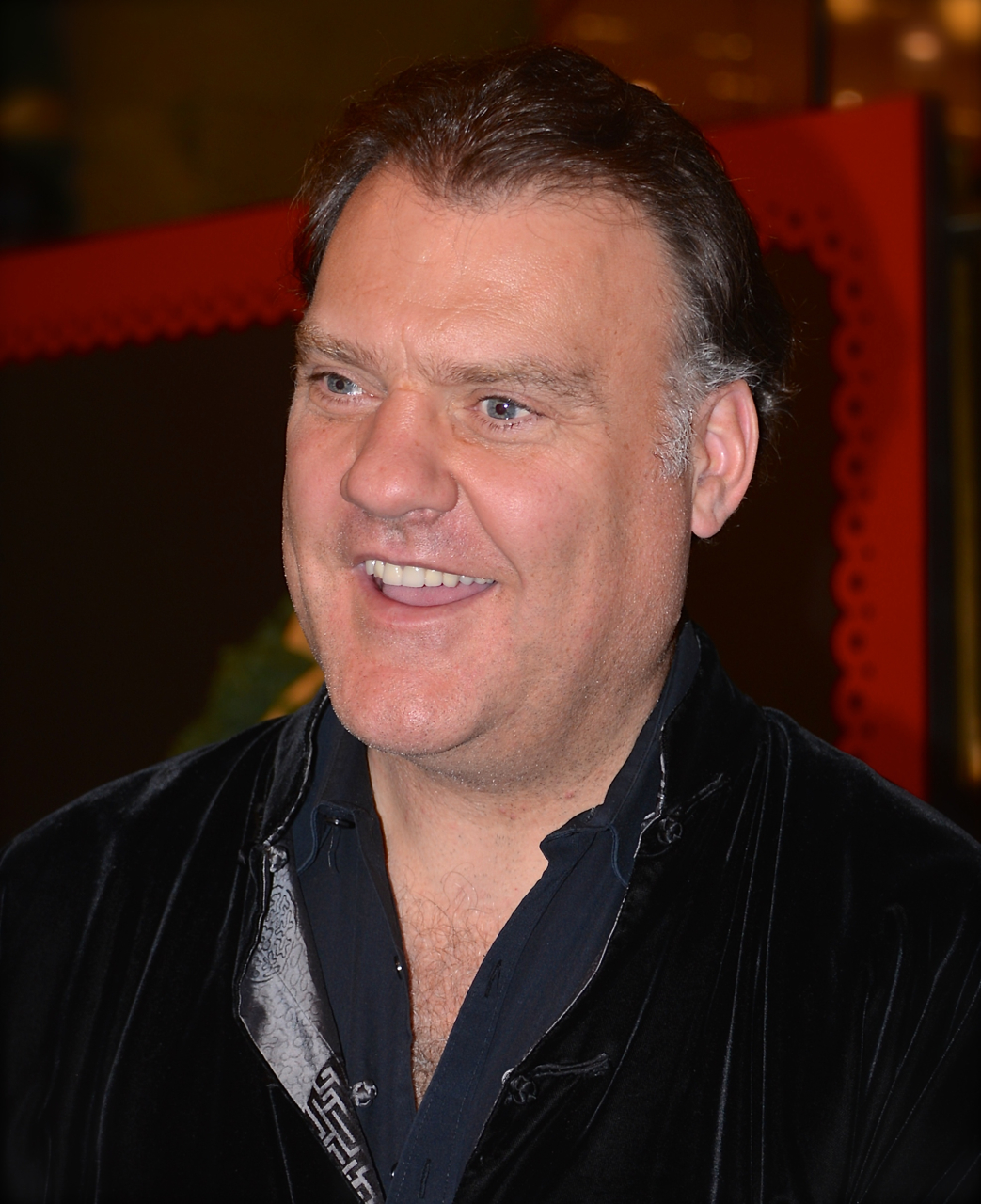
Sir Bryn Terfel (2025–)

Bronwen Lewis (2025–)

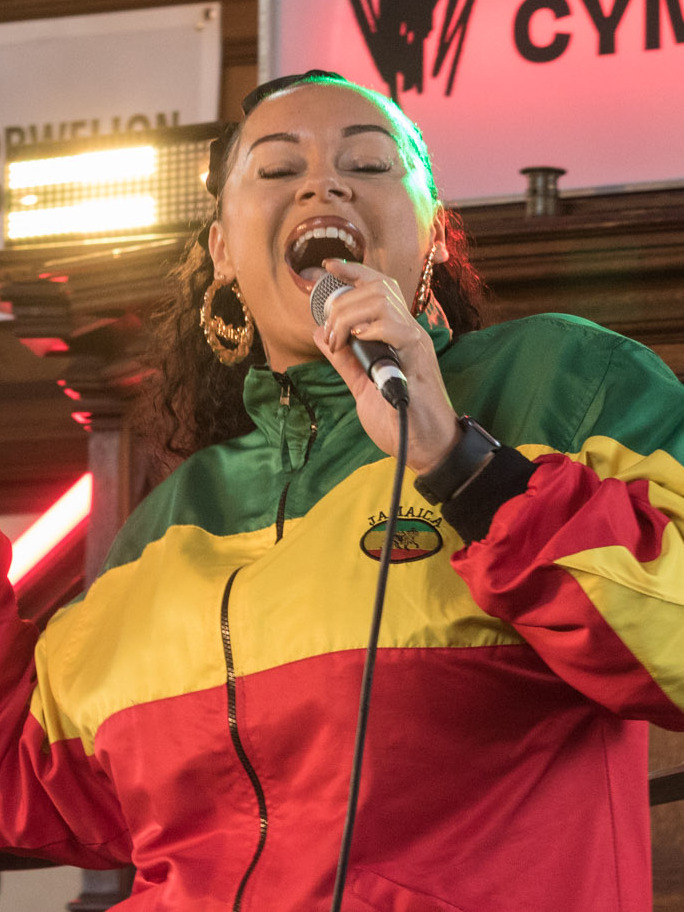
Aleighcia Scott (2025–)

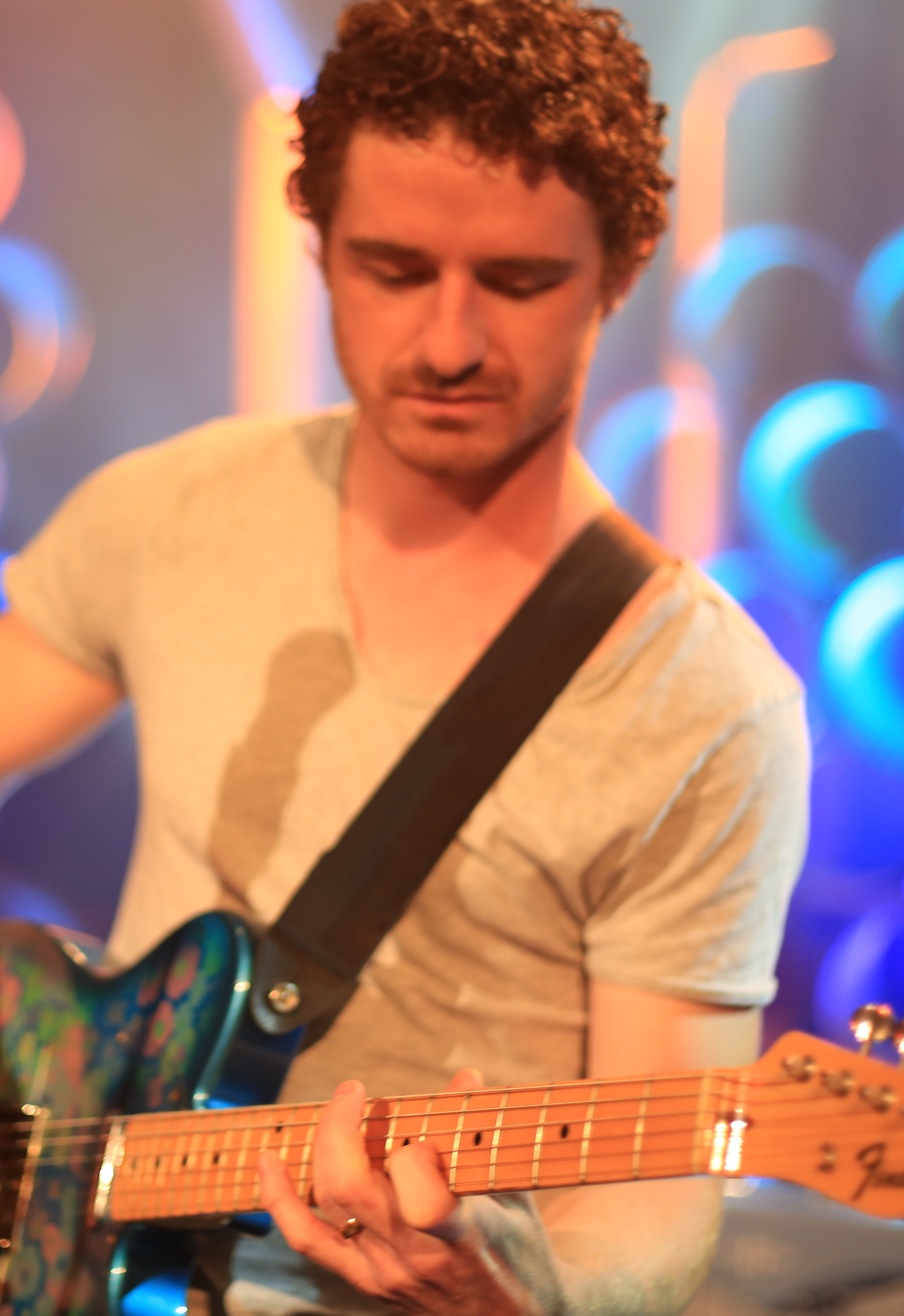
Yws Gwynedd (2025–)

=== Hosts ===
Sian Eleri hosted the show for the first two seasons. On 1 October 2026, it was announced that Steffan Powell would become the new host for the third season.

== Coaches' teams and their artists ==
In each series, each coach chooses a number of acts to progress to the finals. This table shows, for each series, which artists he or she put through to the finals. In each series, artists advance to the final week of the finals, by team-based.

=== Key ===
– Winner
– Runner-up

Series	Sir Bryn Terfel	Bronwen Lewis	Aleighcia Scott	Yws Gwynedd
1	Sara Owen	Liam J Edwards	Rose Datta	Anna Arrieta
1	Megan Haf Davies	Emma Winter	Lauren Fisher	Stephen Hallwood
1	Nia Tyler	Elys Davies	SJ & Endaf	Bethany Powell
2	Carrie Sauce	Cas Jones	Lywis	Chuts
2	Harri Lloyd Morgan	Grace Sanders	Katie Ruth	Keila Hughes
2	Jonathan Rees Davies	Mari Fflur Fychan	Ruth	Ryan Rowe
3	Upcoming series			

== Coaches' advisors ==
During the Callbacks stage, coaches invite a celebrity advisor to help make their decisions.

Series	Sir Bryn Terfel	Bronwen Lewis	Aleighcia Scott	Yws Gwynedd
1	Elin Fflur	Steffan Rhys Hughes	Trystan Llŷr Griffiths	Alys Williams
2	Catty	Ian "H" Watkins	Caryl Parry Jones	Mali Hâf
3	Upcoming series			
