= Lyr =

Lyr or LYR may refer to:

== Mythology ==
- Llŷr, a Welsh figure
- Lir, an Irish sea god
- Leir of Britain, a pseudohistorical king

== Science ==
- Lyra (Lyr), a northern constellation
- Light-year (ly or lyr), an astronomical unit of distance
- LYR protein, a protein containing a leucine–tyrosine–arginine (LYR) tripeptide, should not be confused with LYRM protein

== Transport ==
- Lancashire and Yorkshire Railway, England (1847–1923)
- Svalbard Airport, Longyear, Norway (IATA code:LYR)
- Layar LRT station, Singapore (LRT code:LYR)

== Other uses ==
- LYR (band), led by Simon Armitage

== See also ==
- Llŷr (given name)
- Lyre, a musical instrument
