= Jamz Supernova =

British radio and television presenter and disc jockey

- Born: Jamilla Walters; October 1990 (age 35); New Cross, London, England
- Occupations: DJ; radio presenter; record label owner
- Years active: 2012–present
- Employer: BBC
- Partner: Sam Interface
- Children: 2

Jamilla Walters (born October 1990), known professionally as Jamz Supernova, is a British DJ, radio and television presenter, podcaster and record label owner. She has been described as "one of the leading next generation DJs in the UK."

== Early life ==
Jamz Supernova was born in New Cross in October 1990 and grew up in south east London. She has grandparents from Jamaica, Cuba and Ireland although both her parents were born in the United Kingdom. She has written about her Windrush Generation heritage and her father's passport renewal difficulties against the background of a UK Home Office 'hostile environment' policy announced in 2012.

She attended the BRIT School in Croydon and started work as an intern at the BBC.

== Career ==
Jamz Supernova began her broadcasting career at Reprezent radio, a youth-led radio station based in Brixton and launched her own show on BBC Radio 1Xtra aged 24. She also created the "DIY Generation" podcast for Radio 1Xtra focusing on young people building and owning their own careers, highlighting women and people of colour. She moved over to BBC Radio 6 Music in 2021.

Between October 2020 and December 2023 she presented Selector Radio for the British Council. The 2-hour show is shared with more than 30 countries and aims to connect a global audience to contemporary music developments in the UK. It has around 4 million listeners. As host of the show she wrote about the Black Lives Matter movement and Black British Music, stating that "being the host of a global radio show like Selector is a privilege, how many broadcasters can say their voice is heard in so many countries? I’m also aware it’s a responsibility. As I sat down to plan my show, I knew #BlackLivesMatter was something I needed to address and reflect on – not just because of my position, but, as a black woman.".

As a live DJ, music Jamz Supernova plays an eclectic mix including Bass, Funky, Grime, hip hop, Jersey club and Global Sounds. In addition to club residencies, she has performed at numerous music festivals in the UK and around Europe. In August 2020 she presented a documentary programme for BBC Three: "Is this the end of clubbing?" about the effect COVID-19 had on clubs, their owners and DJs in the UK.

She established her own music label, Future Bounce, in 2018. She works for the label in both A&R and consulting capacities, helping new artists to progress their work.

She was a member of the panel of judges for the 2024 Mercury Prize for 'Album of the Year' from artists from the UK or Ireland.

== Personal life ==
Jamz Supernova met her partner, producer Sam Interface from Somerset, in 2014 and they have two children. She has publicly discussed the criticism she encountered for dating a white partner.
