= Bronwen Lewis =

- Born: 1994 (age 31–32)
- Genres: Pop rock, folk
- Occupations: Singer; radio presenter; television personality
- Instruments: Vocals; guitar; piano
- Website: bronwenlewismusic.com

Bronwen Lewis (born 1994) is a Welsh singer, songwriter, and radio presenter from Blaendulais. She works in both Welsh and English. She first appeared as a contestant on series 2 of The Voice UK but did not make it past the show's audition rounds. In 2014, she sang "Bread and Roses", the title track for the film Pride. She is also well known as a coach on Y Llais, a role she has held since 2025.

== Early and personal life ==
Lewis grew up in Dulais Valley in a creative and musical family, with her father, uncle and grandfather all part of the same choir. Her mother studied printing and interior design. Lewis played the piano from the age of 5 and taught herself to play the guitar at the age of 13.

She studied Graphics and Illustration at Central Saint Martins College of Art and Design in London.

Lewis has been open about having ADHD, which was diagnosed when she was 28.

== Career ==
Lewis came to prominence throughout Great Britain following her blind audition for series 2 of the British version of The Voice, singing a version of the song "Fields of Gold" by Sting in both Welsh and English. The two coaches that had a spot left on their respective teams (will.i.am and Jessie J) did not opt to select Lewis for their teams. Although she did not progress past the auditions round, this exposure helped bolster her career beginnings.

Subsequently, she had a role in the film Pride, which won a BAFTA award, singing the song "Bread and Roses".

Following her role in Pride, Lewis collaborated with English producer Hugh Padgham. Her first album, Home, was released in 2016 and reached Record of the Week on BBC Radio Wales. The album's lead single, "Ti a Fi," was inspired by her grandparents' lifelong relationship.

She has performed throughout the United Kingdom, including several tours with the singer and performer Max Boyce. She published the album Live in Swansea with Boyce in 2019.

During the lockdown caused by COVID-19 in Wales, Lewis gained a large amount of support on social media when she performed around 45 concerts from her home studio. Her TikTok videos, which included Welsh language versions of well-known English songs, also went viral. This brought her attention on the BBC Radio 1 Breakfast Show with Greg James.

At the end of 2020, Lewis released her debut EP, Simple Things. The EP featured original compositions as well as traditional works such as "Myfanwy".

Lewis released her third album, Canvas, in 2021.

She began presenting a Sunday program to BBC Radio Wales in March 2023.

In 2025, Lewis debuted as a coach on Y Llais, the Welsh version of The Voice alongside Sir Bryn Terfel, Aleighcia Scott, and Ywain Gwynedd. She began this role thirteen years after her audition on The Voice UK. She returned as a coach for her second season in 2026.

On 13 June 2025, Lewis released her fourth studio album, Finding Me.

In 2026, Lewis began the "Bronwen's Big Night In" tour which included a sold-out performance at the Swansea Building Society Arena.

== Artistry ==
Lewis has been cited for her impact on the promotion of the Welsh language. Within her music, she has incorporated folk, pop, and rock elements in traditionally rooted Welsh styles. In the latter portion of 2022, her interpretation of "Yma o Hyd" went viral online and was featured in the Disney+ film Welcome to Wrexham.

== Discography ==
=== Albums ===
- Home — 2016
- Live in Swansea — 2019
- Canvas — 2021
- Finding Me — 2025

=== EPs ===
- Simple Things — 2020
