= Llŷr (given name) =

Llŷr or Llyr is a Welsh masculine given name. Notable people with the name include:

- Llyr Gruffydd (born 1976), Welsh politician
- Llŷr Ifans (born 1968), Welsh actor
- Llŷr Powell (born 1995), Welsh politician
- Llŷr Williams (born 1976), Welsh concert pianist
- Trystan Llŷr Griffiths (born c. 1987), Welsh tenor

== See also ==
- Jonathan Llyr (born 1966), Canadian actor and TV personality
- Llŷr Welsh mythological figure
