= Selector Radio =

- Genre: Music Show
- Running time: 120 minutes (approx)
- Country of origin: Syndicated Worldwide
- Language: English
- Hosted by: Sian Eleri
- Produced by: Audio Always / Hayley Clarke / Sam Davies
- Recording studio: Manchester / London
- No. of episodes: over 1,000
- Website: https://music.britishcouncil.org/selector-radio

Selector Radio is a weekly two-hour radio show produced by Audio Always for the British Council. Its aim is to introduce new music and scenes from the UK, inspired by influences from around the world, to listeners across the globe. The shows covers many musical genres, ranging from grime, indie, soul, and dance and also features live sessions and DJ mixes including coverage from its own stages at South by Southwest and The Great Escape.

Launched in 2001, as The Selector, the show is broadcast in more than 30 countries. In 2011, The Sunday Times likened Selector Radio to "the best of John Peel".

As well as being aired in many countries around the world, the show is also available weekly via Mixcloud.

== Presenters ==
From the launch of Selector radio in June 2001, the presenter was Andrea Oliver. From June 2009 to September 2019, the presenter was DJ Goldierocks.

On Friday 4 October 2019, Jamz Supernova was announced as the new presenter. She hosted events with the British Council at SXSW and The Great Escape festivals, aiming to champion UK music far and wide. On Friday 22 December 2023, Sian Eleri was announced as the new presenter. Mo Ayoub is the regular deputy presenter and host of the sister podcast Selector: Behind the Music.

== Audience and global reach ==
With an audience estimated to be in excess of 4 million listeners, Selector is syndicated to over 30 countries around the world including Mexico, China, Malawi, Cuba, Spain and Ukraine.

== Content and production ==
Each edition of Selector Radio includes a guest DJ mix. The show regularly features interviews and live sessions. Guests have included Tinie Tempah, Metronomy, Ghostpoet, Jessie Ware, Foreign Beggars, Egyptian Hip Hop, Chvrches, Errors, Daughter, Smoke Fairies and Dog Is Dead.

Selector Radio is produced by Audio Always. Previously, the independent production company Folded Wing produced the show between 2010 and 2023 and, before that, the show was produced by Somethin' Else when the show began in 2001. The show is currently produced by Hayley Clarke and has previously been produced by Matthew Broderick, Pippa Brown, Cassidy Baille, Pete Linney and many others.

== Awards ==
- In 2015, Selector Radio won World's Best Online Music Radio Show at the Mixcloud Awards.
- In 2005 Selector received a gold award at the Sony Radio Academy Awards for Weekly Music Show Of The Year.
- In 2011 Selector was named 'International Radio Show of the Year' at the International Radio Festival in Zurich and won bronze for Best Regularly Scheduled Music Program at the New York Festivals Awards.

== Airing and partner radio stations ==
The English language version of Selector Radio is presented by Sian Eleri.

The show airs internationally. It is also syndicated in a kit form, allowing non-English speaking presenters to create unique versions of the show in their native language. The show is also sometimes recorded overseas – in 2010 it was recorded together with partner stations in Mexico, Mauritius and Kazakhstan.

Selector is currently broadcast in the following countries:

Country	Station	Broadcast (Local Time)
Albania	Club FM	Friday - 18:00-21:00
Armenia	Radio Van	
Argentina	One103.7 FM	Sunday 22:00 - 23:00
Austria	Freirad 105.9	
Australia	FBi Radio 94.5 FM	Wednesday 12:00 - 13:00
Azerbaijan	Ireli Radio	Wednesday 16:00 - 18:00
Bosnia & Herzegovina	Radio Sarajevo 90,2, EFM (Sarajevo) & Vesta Radio	Saturday 18:00 - 20:00 (EFM) Friday 20:00-22:00 (Vesta)
Bulgaria	Radio Fresh	Sunday 22:00 - 23:00
Burma	Mandalay FM / Pyinsawaddi FM	
China	Phoenix Radio (Shenzhen) & FM101.8 (Beijing)	Friday 23:00 - 00:00 (Phoenix) & Saturday 23:00 - 01:00 (FM101.8)
Colombia	Radionica	Saturday 08:00 - 10:00 (Radionica)
Croatia	Radio Zona & Radio Laus & Radio 101	Monday 20:30 - 22:00
Czech Republic	Radio Wave	Saturday 20:00 - 22:00
Egypt	Nile FM	Friday 15:00 - 17:00
Georgia	Fortuna Plus FM 103.4	
Greece	Spam Radio & Thessaloniki Municipality Radio FM 100.6	Friday 13:00 - 15:00
Hungary	MR2-Petofi Radio	Saturday 20:00 - 22:00
Indonesia	Trax 104.4 FM	Thursday 20:00 - 22:00
Ireland	2XM	
Israel	Radio 88FM	Friday 23:00 - 01:00 Kobi Menora
Jordan	Radio AlBalad	
Kazakhstan	Energy FM 102.2 FM	Wednesday 22:00 - 00:00
Libya	Radio Zone	Saturday 20:00 - 22:00
Malawi	Power FM	Saturday 18:00 - 20:00
Malaysia	BFM 89.9	Sunday 21:00 - 23:00
Mexico	Ibero 90.9FM	Friday 15:00 - 17:00 and Sunday 14:00 - 16:00
Mauritius	Music FM - Mauritius Broadcasting Corporation	Friday 18:00 - 20:00
Montenegro	Atlas Radio	
Oman	FM90.4 Radio Sultanate	Thursday 22:00 - 00:00 and Sunday 23:00 - 00:00
Philippines	Jam 88.3	Saturday 9:00-10:00 (originally 10:00AM–12:00PM)
Poland	Akademickie Radio Kampus	Sunday 14:00 - 16:00
Portugal	MEOSW	Saturday 10:00 - 12:00
Qatar	QBS Radio	Sunday 16:00 - 18:00
Romania	Cluj-Napoca University Radio	
Russia	Megapolis 89.5FM	Saturday 20:00 - 21:00
Seychelles	Paradise FM	Sunday 19:00 - 21:00 & Repeated Tuesdays 23:00 - 00:00
Slovakia	Rádio FM	Saturday 08:00 - 10:00
Spain	RNE 3	
Syria	Arabesque FM	Saturday 20:00 - 22:00
Turkey	Yasam Radyo – 89.4 (Istanbul), Radyo A (Eskisehir) and Radio KTU (Trabzon)	
Uganda	Touch FM	
Ukraine	Radio Promin	Sunday 16:00 - 18:00 & Repeated Tuesday 22:00 - 00:00
Vietnam	Voice Of Vietnam	
