= Steffan Powell =

Welsh journalist and broadcaster

Steffan Powell (born 1987/1988) is a Welsh journalist and broadcaster, specialising in news and current affairs. His presenting and reporting is for BBC and S4C output.

== Background ==
Powell was raised for at least part of his childhood in the Amman Valley in south Wales. He was a keen reader during his childhood, and says that his extensive reading as a child has helped him be a better journalist. He attended Amman Valley Comprehensive School. Powell studied Law and Politics at Cardiff University, graduating with an LLB (Hons) in 2008. He then studied a postgraduate diploma in journalism studies at the same university, graduating with the diploma in 2009.

== Career ==
Powell's first job in the media was as a broadcast journalist at BBC Radio Cymru. Powell co-founded a blog about Welsh politics in 2009 or 2010, and as of 2010 he worked at Tinopolis.

In 2017, Powell was named by the Institute of Welsh Affairs on a list of 30 people working to improve Wales over the next 30 years. As of 2017, Powell was a broadcast journalist at Newsbeat; he remains a broadcast journalist at Newsbeat. In the late 2010s, Powell co-presented a debate programme on BBC One Wales which was broadcast monthly. He also presented BBC Radio 1's Gaming Show in the 2010s.

As of 2020, Powell reported for the BBC Wales television consumer programme X-Ray. In 2021, Powell began being the BBC's first Gaming Correspondent, a role in which he examined the impact of gaming on culture and society. In 2023, it was announced that Powell would present Doctor Who: Unleashed, a documentary series going behind-the-scenes of Doctor Who. In 2024, Powell presented a series on S4C about climate change issues affecting Wales; the series is one of several on S4C that Powell either has presented or presents. In 2025, Powell presented a BBC documentary on BBC One Wales that exposed the mass-buying of thousands of tickets for pop concerts by ticket touts. The same year, he presented Boom Town: How Merthyr Made the World, a documentary about the industrial history of Merthyr Tydfil in South Wales.

Powell remains a journalist at Newsbeat, whose debate specials on the BBC News channel he has also presented, and remains presenter of the podcast Doctor Who Unleashed; he also continues to broadcast on S4C output.

Powell regularly sits in for other presenters on BBC radio; for example, he sits in on BBC Radio 5 Live's Drive programme and for Owain Wyn Evans on BBC Radio 2.

He has also covered NFL games for both BBC Radio 5 Live and 5/5Action.

== Personal life ==
In 2018, Powell married Emma Jones.

== Notable achievements ==
In 2011, Powell completed the arcade game Time Crisis II on Aberystwyth Pier for a total cost of one pound.
