= Sian Eleri =

Welsh radio presenter

- Born: Sian Eleri Evans; 12 November 1994 (age 31); Caernarfon, Wales
- Education: University of Leeds
- Presenting career
- Show: Future Artists, The Chillest Show, The Power Down Playlist, Selector Radio
- Stations: BBC Radio 1 & Selector Radio
- Time slot: 20.00-22.00 Monday & Tuesday (Future Artists), 21:00-23:00 Sunday (Chillest Show) & 22:00-23:00 Monday-Wednesday (Power Down Playlist)
- Style: Chill songs

Sian Eleri Evans (born 12 November 1994), known professionally as Sian Eleri, is a Welsh radio DJ and television presenter. She is best known for presenting her shows on BBC Radio 1, Selector Radio and Radio Cymru.

== Early life ==
Eleri is from Caernarfon. She studied broadcast journalism at the University of Leeds.

== Career ==
Before joining Radio 1, Eleri presented on BBC Radio Cymru in 2018.

Eleri covered Phil Taggart's Chillest Show on BBC Radio 1 during Christmas 2019. In November 2020, it was announced that Eleri would permanently take over Phil Taggart's show following his departure from the station. On 20 April 2021, further timetable changes were announced as it was revealed Annie Mac would leave the station. In addition to hosting the Chillest Show, Eleri has hosted the Power Down Playlist every Monday to Wednesday night since September 2021 from 10-11pm. The programme is also streamed on Radio 1's sister station, BBC Radio 1 Relax, which closed down in July 2024. On 15 April 2024, Eleri became a presenter for Radio 1's Future Artists show, replacing Jack Saunders as he went on to take over the New Music Show from Clara Amfo.

Eleri curates an event series of artist performances titled Tonna (translating to the colloquial form of waves in Welsh). The event is held at the venue OMEARA, London. Previous artists who have performed include Jordan Stephens, Lucy Blue and others.

On 15 August 2023, Eleri's four-part horror documentary series Paranormal: The Girl, the Ghost and the Gravestone was broadcast on BBC Three and released as a boxset on iPlayer.

Further series of Paranormal have been produced. In 2024 she investigated UFO sightings in Broad Haven and in 2025, Helen Duncan, in Britain's Last Witch.

On 22 December 2023, Eleri was announced as the new host of Selector Radio, replacing Jamz Supernova on the global radio show.

In 2025, Eleri was the presenter for the Welsh language television singing competition, Y Llais (The Voice), broadcast on S4C from 9 February.

In 2026, Eleri presented a BBC Two Wales documentary Keep the World Away - Finding Gwen John to accompany the exhibition about the Welsh artist at National Museum Cardiff.
