= Buddug =

Buddug (Welsh pronunciation: [ˈbɨ̞ðɨ̞ɡ]) is a feminine given name of Welsh origin. It means "victorious" and is the Modern Welsh descendant of the name of Boudica.

== Notable Buddugs ==
- Buddug (d. AD 60 or 61), British queen of the Iceni tribe
- Buddug Verona James, Welsh mezzo-soprano
- Buddug Williams (1932–2021), Welsh actress
- Buddug Jones (2006 - present), Welsh singer and performer
