= Mali Hâf =

Welsh-language singer

- Born: July 28, 1997 (age 29)
- Education: Leeds Conservatoire
- Occupation: singer-songwriter
- Musical career
- Origin: Cardiff, Wales
- Genre: Celtic pop
- Website: www.malihaf.com

Mali Hâf (born 28 July 1997) is a Welsh-language singer from Cardiff, Wales, who appeared at Glastonbury Festival 2025.

== Early life ==
Mali Hâf grew up in Wales and learnt piano at a young age. She has a sister called Sioned, and her grandparents lived in Llanfarian near Aberystwyth.

Hâf studied Popular Music at Leeds Conservatoire.

== Career ==
Mali Hâf's single Mae Hen Wlad fy Mamau (H.W.F.M) (English: Old Land of My Mothers) became popular on radio and social media in 2025. It is a reimagining of the Welsh anthem, Hen Wlad Fy Nhadau (English: Old Land of My Fathers). The song won her the 6 Music Roundtable competition, despite the judges not understanding Welsh.

Mali Hâf was a runner-up in the Glastonbury Emerging Talent Competition 2025 with her song Esgusodion, winning the opportunity to perform at the festival's BBC Introducing stage.

Hâf's single Llais (released July 2025) was inspired by Chappell Roan, Sabrina Carpenter and Marina. She toured the UK at the end of 2025.

Hâf describes her style as "Celtic pop", and cites David Byrne as an influence, as well as Gwenno, Kate Bush and Björk. She works from a home studio in Cardiff called Gwefus Mefus (English: Strawberry Lips), and releases her music under the Côsh record label.

== Personal life ==
Mali Hâf is from Cardiff, where she worked as a community worker.

Hâf was raised a Buddhist and seeks inspiration from Saraswati.

Hâf was diagnosed with ADHD at 16 and experiences synesthesia. She describes herself as neurodivergent. She takes ADHD medication to help her finish her creative projects.
