= Trystan Llŷr Griffiths =

Welsh operatic tenor (born c.1987)

Trystan Llŷr Griffiths, also known as Trystan Griffiths or Trystan Llŷr (born c.1987), is a Welsh tenor.

Griffiths is from Clunderwen in Pembrokeshire, and is Welsh-speaking. He often performs with his brother, Gwydion Rhys, who is an actor and singer. He studied Theatre, Music and Media at University of Wales Trinity Saint David at Carmarthen, and went on to the Royal Welsh College of Music & Drama in Cardiff, studying under Adrian Thompson and Ingrid Surgenor. In 2016 he married his wife, Gwen, whom he has known since schooldays. They have a daughter, Efa.

Awards won by Griffiths have included the 2009 Osborne Roberts award for under-25s at the National Eisteddfod of Wales and the David Lloyd and Jean Skidmore Scholarship for the most promising tenor. He won the 2011 W. Towyn Roberts scholarship at the National Eisteddfod in Wrexham. In 2012 he won both the MOCSA Young Welsh Singer of the Year award, and the title "Voice of Wales" as a result of a televised S4C series sponsored by Decca.

Griffiths has performed with Scottish Opera and Welsh National Opera. His first album, Trystan, was released in 2016 by Sain. After training at the National Opera Studio during 2015, he joined the International Opera Studio in Zürich in 2016. He also features on Opera Rara's recording of Donizetti's Le duc d'Albe as Carlos with the Hallé Orchestra conducted by Sir Mark Elder.

In 2017, in addition to recording "O Holy Night" with the Royal Philharmonic Orchestra for inclusion in the Classic FM Nation's Favourite Carols album, Griffiths signed a recording contract with Decca Records. He is also a soloist on Requiem, by Rebecca Dale, the first album by a female composer to be released by Decca Classics.

In 2022, he appeared as Tamino in a production of The Magic Flute by Opéra national du Rhin, and went on to play the same role for Welsh National Opera.
