= Aleighcia Scott =

Welsh-Jamaican reggae artist and presenter

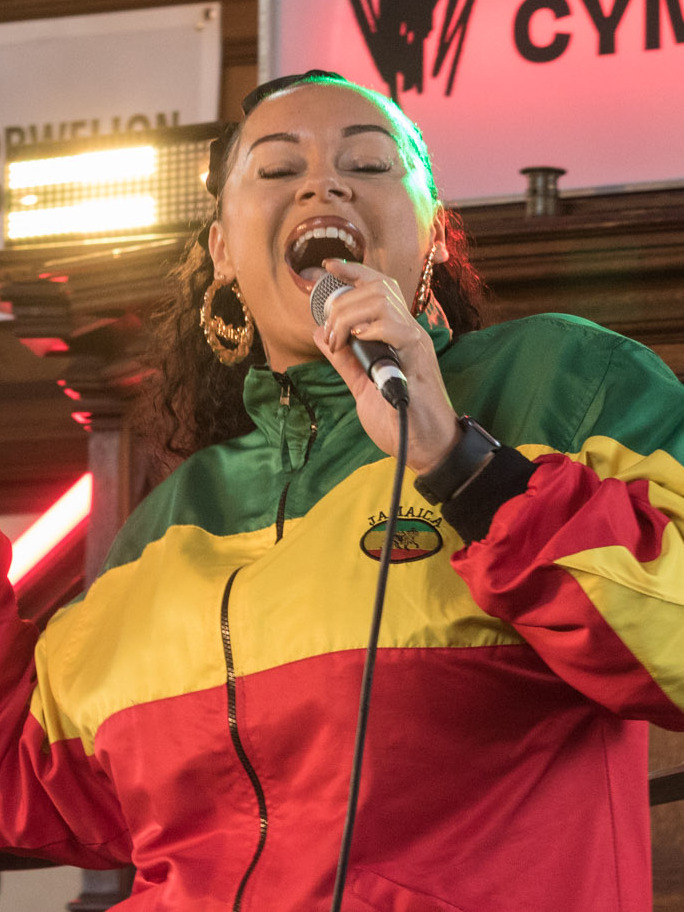
- Scott performing in 2024
- Born: Cardiff, Wales
- Occupations: Singer-songwriter, presenter
- Musical career
- Genres: Reggae; Dancehall; R&B
- Instruments: Vocals
- Presenting career
- Show: Aleighcia Scott
- Network: BBC Radio Wales
- Website: www.aleighciascott.com

Aleighcia Scott is a Welsh-Jamaican singer-songwriter and radio presenter, currently working with the BBC. She hosts the Thursday evening show on BBC Radio Wales and is known for her contributions to the UK reggae music scene.

== Early and personal life ==
Scott was born in Cardiff, Wales, and has family roots in Trelawny, Jamaica. Her Welsh and Jamaican heritage has shaped her artistic identity, blending elements from both cultures into her work. Her cultural background is a recurring theme in her artistry

== Career ==
=== Music ===
Scott is a reggae artist who has worked with renowned industry figures, such as Salaam Remi, noted for her collaborations with Amy Winehouse and the Fugees. She has released music under the independent London-based label, Pecking Records, which aided Scott in establishing her career.

Scott's debut EP, Forever in Love, released in April 2018, marked her introduction into the British reggae scene. Her first album, Windrush Baby, was released in September 2023 following over five years of collaboration with producer Rory StoneLove. Released on StoneLove's Black Dub label, the album addresses themes of heritage, resilience, and cultural identity, while the record's title pays homage to the Caribbean side of her dual heritage - her grandparents were part of the “Windrush generation”.

In September 2024, Scott performed at the Sky Arts Awards alongside notable acts, including The Darkness, Slash, Brian Johnson, Ren, The Three Sopranos, and The Kanneh-Masons. In March 2025 her song Dod o’r Galon (Coming from the Heart) attained the No. 1 position in the ITunes Reggae chart, the first Welsh-language song ever to do so.

=== Radio ===
In March 2022, Scott was announced as the host of BBC Radio Wales' Thursday evening show, joining Huw Stephens, who presents the Monday to Wednesday editions. Her program focuses on reggae and Caribbean music, introducing Welsh audiences to diverse musical traditions.

During Christmas 2022, she hosted A Very Reggae Christmas with Aleighcia Scott, a festive reggae special for BBC Radio Wales. Additionally, she has occasionally sat in for David Rodigan on his Sunday afternoon reggae show on BBC Radio 1Xtra.

=== Other work ===
In 2025, Scott was one of the coaches in Y Llais, a Welsh-language version of The Voice singing contest format. Scott's final artist, Rose Datta, won the season and Scott was the winning coach. She returned for her second season in 2026.

== Artistic style ==
=== Musical style and influences ===
Aleighcia Scott's music integrates traditional reggae with contemporary elements, reflecting her dual Welsh-Jamaican heritage. Her lyrics explore themes of identity, heritage, and love, often drawing on personal and cultural experiences. Scott has attributed much of her musical education to her father, with reggae, soul and jazz being prominently featured throughout her childhood. Other artists she has cited as her influences include Sam Cooke, Etta James, Erykah Badu, Dennis Brown, Sanchez and Marcia Griffiths.

== Discography ==
=== Singles ===
- Vibe With Me (2017)
- Bad Mind (2017)
- Walk Away From Love (2017)
- Conscious Queen (2019)
- Jealous of the Angels (2020)
- Bad Lover (2020)
- I Want You (2021)
- City (2021)
- Do You (2023)
- Pretty Little Brown Thing (2023)
- In My Shoes (2023)
- Dod o'r Galon (2025)
- Diolch (2025)
- Fade Away (2025)

=== Albums and EPs ===
- Forever In Love (EP, 2018)
- Windrush Baby (2023)
- Taith (2026)
