= Bryn Terfel =

Welsh bass-baritone singer (born 1965)

Sir Bryn Terfel CBE
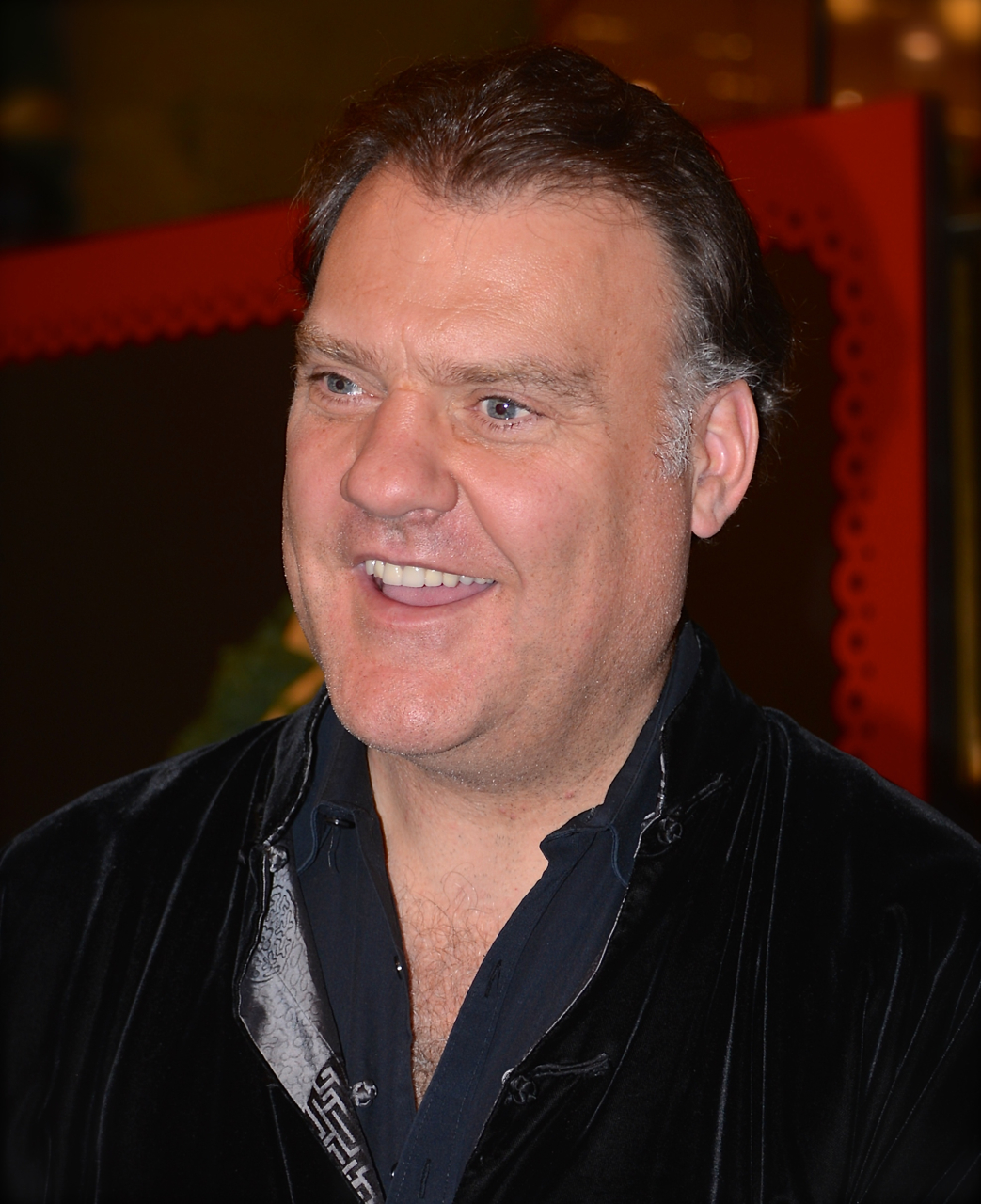
- Terfel in Stockholm, December 2013
- Born: Bryn Terfel Jones; 9 November 1965 (age 61); Pant Glas, Caernarfonshire, Wales, UK
- Education: Guildhall School of Music and Drama
- Occupation: Opera singer (bass-baritone)
- Years active: 1984−present
- Spouses: Lesley Jones (m. 1987; div. 2013); Hannah Stone (m. 2019)
- Children: 5

Sir Bryn Terfel Jones (Welsh pronunciation: [ˈbrɨn ˈtɛrvɛl]; born 9 November 1965) is a Welsh bass-baritone opera and concert singer. Terfel was initially primarily associated with the roles of Mozart, particularly Figaro, Leporello and Don Giovanni, but he has subsequently shifted his attention to heavier roles, especially those by Puccini and Wagner.

== Biography ==
Terfel was born in Pant Glas, Caernarfonshire, Wales, the son of a farmer. His first language is Welsh. He chose Bryn Terfel as his professional name to avoid confusion with another Welsh baritone, Delme Bryn-Jones. He had an interest in and talent for music from a young age. A family friend taught him how to sing, starting with traditional Welsh songs.

After winning numerous competitions for his singing, Terfel moved to London in 1984 and entered the Guildhall School of Music and Drama, where he studied under Rudolf Piernay. In 1988, he entered and won the Morriston Orpheus Choir Supporters' Association Young Welsh Singer of the Year Competition. He graduated in 1989, winning the Kathleen Ferrier Memorial Award and the Gold Medal. The same year, he came second behind Dmitri Hvorostovsky in the Cardiff Singer of the World competition, winning the Lieder Prize.

=== Career ===
==== 1990s ====
In 1990 Terfel made his operatic debut as Guglielmo in Così fan tutte for Welsh National Opera. Later in the same season, he sang the title role in The Marriage of Figaro, a role with which he made his debut with English National Opera in 1991.

His international operatic career began that same year when he sang the Speaker in Mozart's The Magic Flute at the Théâtre de la Monnaie in Brussels, and made his United States debut as Figaro at the Santa Fe Opera.

In 1992, Terfel made his Royal Opera House, Covent Garden debut as Masetto in Don Giovanni, with Thomas Allen in the title role. That same year, he made his Salzburg Easter Festival debut singing the role of the Spirit Messenger in Die Frau ohne Schatten. This was followed by an international breakthrough at the main Salzburg Festival when he sang Jochanaan in Strauss's Salome. He went on to make his debut as Figaro at the Vienna State Opera.

On 19 June 1992, Terfel made his U.S. concert debut singing in Mahler's Eighth Symphony with the Chicago Symphony Orchestra at the Ravinia Festival under the baton of James Levine. Also at the festival, on 22 June, he and Levine (at the piano) performed Schumann's Liederkreis (op. 39) and Schubert's Schwanengesang, and on 27 June, he was Abimélech in Saint-Saëns's Samson and Delilah (with Plácido Domingo and Denyce Graves in the title roles), also with the CSO under Levine. In January and February 1993, Terfel sang the role of Donner in Wagner's Das Rheingold at Lyric Opera of Chicago; Zubin Mehta conducted.

Also in 1992, he signed an exclusive recording contract with Deutsche Grammophon and returned to the Welsh National Opera to sing Ford in Falstaff. In 1993, he recorded the role of Wilfred Shadbolt in The Yeomen of the Guard, by Gilbert and Sullivan and sang Figaro to acclaim at the Théâtre du Châtelet in Paris.

External audio
- Terfel may be heard as Jochanaan, in Richard Strauss' opera Salome, Op. 54, with the Vienna Philharmonic Orchestra conducted by Christoph von Dohnányi, and with Catherine Malfitano, in 1995 Here on archive.org

In 1994, Terfel sang Figaro at Covent Garden and made his Metropolitan Opera and Teatro Nacional de São Carlos debuts in the same role. However, back surgery in 1994 (and again in 2000) prevented him from performing in several scheduled events.

In 1996, he expanded his repertoire to include more Wagner, singing Wolfram in Tannhäuser at the Metropolitan Opera, and Stravinsky, singing Nick Shadow in The Rake's Progress at the Welsh National Opera. These performances won him the Royal Philharmonic Society Award for the singer of the year.

In 1997, Terfel made his La Scala debut as Figaro. In 1998, he had a recital at Carnegie Hall, including works by Wolf, Fauré, Brahms, Schumann, Schubert, and others. In 1999, he performed in Paris the title role of Don Giovanni for the first time and sang his first Falstaff at the Lyric Opera of Chicago; the latter of which he reprised in the inaugural production at the newly refurbished Royal Opera House.

In 1999, Terfel performed the Rugby World Cup anthem "World in Union" with Shirley Bassey at the Millennium Stadium before the 1999 Rugby World Cup Final.

==== 2000s ====
In 2000, Terfel said he would like to record "an album of Gilbert and Sullivan arias".

In 2003, Terfel hosted and performed on the stage with opera tenor José Carreras and soprano Hayley Westenra in front of a capacity crowd of 10,000 people at the Faenol Festival in Wales.

In 2007, Terfel performed at the opening gala concert for the re-dedication of the Salt Lake Tabernacle with the Mormon Tabernacle Choir on 6–7 April. Later, he performed the title role in a concert version of Sweeney Todd that had four performances from 5–7 July at London's Royal Festival Hall. This idea came from Terfel, his fellow bass-baritone and friend, the Irishman Dermot Malone.

Terfel has not shied away from popular music either. He has recorded CDs of songs by Lerner and Loewe and Rodgers and Hammerstein. In 2001, he commissioned and performed 'Atgof o'r Sêr' ('Memory of the Stars') in the National Eisteddfod with the composer Robat Arwyn.

In September 2007, Terfel withdrew, to severe criticism, from Covent Garden's Der Ring des Nibelungen when his six-year-old son required several operations on his finger. But he successfully returned to the Met in November 2007 to sing the role of Figaro. He told reporters in New York City that he would retire Figaro from his repertoire. But he sang the role of Wotan in Covent Garden's revival of Der Ring from September to November 2012.

Terfel intended to take 2008 as a sabbatical from opera performances, but broke this to take the title role in WNO's revival of Falstaff. He had sung in this production in 1993, when he played the role of Ford. In 2009, Terfel sang Scarpia and the Dutchman for the Royal Opera House.

==== Since 2010 ====
In 2010, Terfel debuted as Hans Sachs in Wagner's Die Meistersinger in a production for Welsh National Opera, in Cardiff and on tour.

On 17 July 2010, the cast of this production gave a "concert staging" at the Royal Albert Hall as part of the 2010 BBC Proms, which was broadcast on BBC Radio 3 and BBC Four television. On 31 July, again at the Proms, he performed in a concert from the Royal Albert Hall celebrating the works of Stephen Sondheim, in his 80th birthday year.

Terfel took on the role of Wotan for the premiere performances of Robert Lepage's new Met staging of Wagner's Der Ring, 2010–12. He sang the role in all three of the four Der Ring operas featuring Wotan: Das Rheingold, Die Walküre and Siegfried.

In September 2013, Terfel collaborated with Mormon Tabernacle Choir released the album Homeward Bound which reached No. 58 on the Official UK Charts.

In September 2014 Terfel reprised his role as Sweeney Todd in the Live from Lincoln Center concert production of Sweeney Todd, which was broadcast on PBS. This production also starred Emma Thompson as Mrs Lovett, Philip Quast as Judge Turpin, and Audra McDonald as The Beggar Woman. Terfel, Thompson, and Quest reprised their roles in 2015 with the English National Opera opposite John Owen-Jones and Katie Hall as Pirelli and Johanna at the London Coliseum.

In 2016, Terfel took the title role in Mussorgsky's Boris Godunov, directed by Antonio Pappano at the Royal Opera House.

On 6 May 2023, Terfel performed a setting in Welsh, by Paul Mealor, of Kyrie eleison at the Coronation of Charles III and Camilla in Westminster Abbey. This was the first time Welsh had been sung at a coronation service. On 7 May, he sang "You'll Never Walk Alone" in a duet with Andrea Bocelli at the Coronation Concert at Windsor Castle.

In February 2024, Terfel released a new album, Sea Songs, on Deutsche Grammophon.

In 2025 and 2026, Terfel was one of the coaches in Y Llais, a Welsh-language version of The Voice UK.

=== Personal life ===
Terfel was married to his childhood sweetheart, Lesley, in 1987 until their divorce in 2013. The marriage produced three children.

In 2017, Terfel and harpist Hannah Stone had a daughter. The couple married on 26 July 2019 at Caersalem Newydd Baptist Church in the bride's home city of Swansea.

Terfel was a leading petitioner in creating Bontnewydd railway station on the rebuilt Welsh Highland Railway and in part sponsored its construction.

== Partial solo discography ==
- Bryn Terfel – Volume I (1988)
- Bryn Terfel – Volume II (1990)
- The Vagabond and Other Songs by Vaughan Williams, Butterworth, Finzi and Ireland (1995)
- Something Wonderful (1996)
- Handel Arias (1997)
- We'll Keep a Welcome (2000)
- Some Enchanted Evening (2001)
- Under the Stars (2003), with Renée Fleming
- Bryn (2003)
- Simple Gifts (2005)
- Tutto Mozart! (2006)
- First Love (2008), songs from the British Isles
- Bad Boys (2009)
- Carols and Christmas Songs (2010)
- Homeward Bound (2013), with the Mormon Tabernacle Choir
- Dreams and Songs (2018)
- Sea Songs (2024)

=== Welsh albums ===
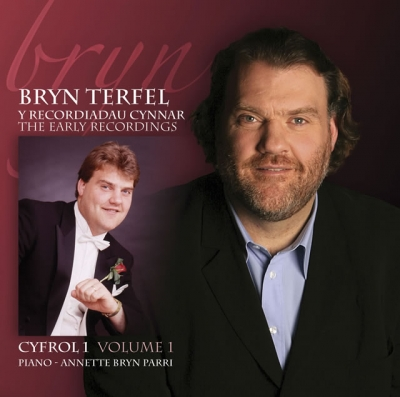
Sain (Recordings) Ltd; 1988

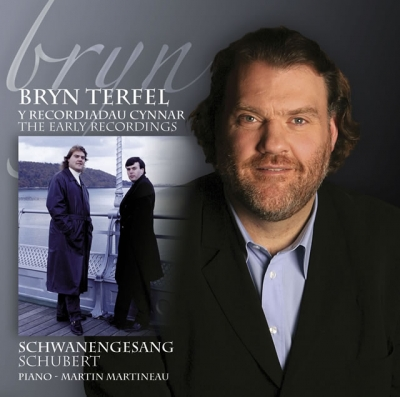
Sain (Recordings) Ltd; 1990

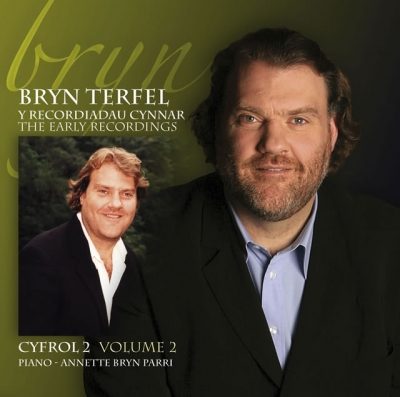
Sain (Recordings) Ltd; 1990

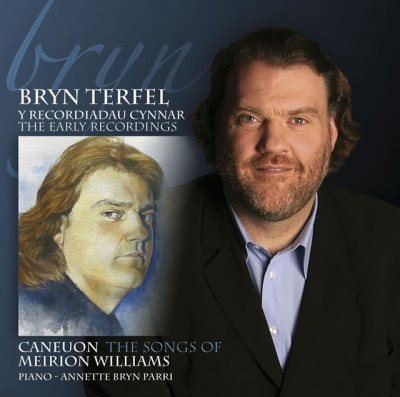
Sain (Recordings) Ltd; 1993

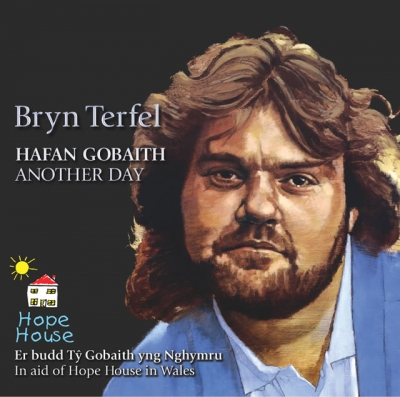
Sain (Recordings) Ltd; 1995

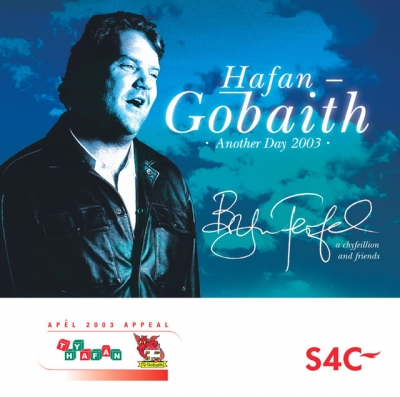
Sain (Recordings) Ltd; 2003

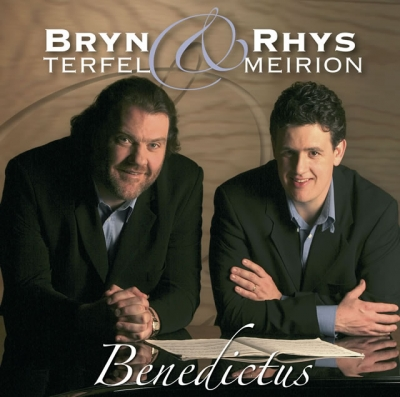
Sain (Recordings) Ltd; 2005

== Videography ==
- James Levine's 25th Anniversary Metropolitan Opera Gala (1996), Deutsche Grammophon DVD, B0004602-09

== Honours and awards ==
Terfel continues to be a patron of the Welsh language and Welsh culture, facets of his life which are largely unknown outside his native Wales. Terfel has been awarded the honour, by the National Eisteddfod, of membership of the Gorsedd of Bards. The Gorsedd was created in 1792 as a celebration of Welsh heritage, and inductees are considered to have contributed to Welsh culture.

- Morriston Orpheus Choir Supporters' Association (MOCSA) Young Welsh Singer of the Year (1988)
- Commander of the Order of the British Empire (2003)
- Queen's Medal for Music (2006)
- Honorary Fellow of Jesus College, Oxford (2008)
- Honorary Doctorate in Music, Bangor University (2012)
- Honorary Doctorate in Music, Royal College of Music (2012)
- Austrian Kammersänger (2022)

In 2006, the Hamburg-based Alfred Toepfer Foundation awarded Terfel its annual Shakespeare Prize in recognition of his life's work.

Terfel was knighted in the 2017 New Year Honours for services to music.

Year	Award	Category	Result
2000	Classic Brit Awards	Male Artist of the Year	Won
2004	Classic Brit Awards	Male Artist of the Year	Won
2004	Classic Brit Awards	Album of the Year (Bryn)	Won
2005	Classic Brit Awards	Male Artist of the Year	Won
2007	Classic Brit Awards	Singer of the Year	Nominated
2007	Classic Brit Awards	Critic's Choice	Nominated
2010	Classic Brit Awards	Male Artist of the Year	Nominated
2011	Classic Brit Awards	Album of the Year (Carols & Christmas Songs)	Nominated
2013	Grammy Awards	Best Opera Recording (Metropolitan Opera's recording of Richard Wagner's Der Ring des Nibelungen)	Won

Terfel is also president of the Welsh homelessness charity Shelter Cymru and is patron of Bobath Children's Therapy Centre Wales, a registered charity based in Cardiff which provides specialist Bobath therapy to children from all over Wales who have cerebral palsy.

Terfel is a vice president of the Dunvant Male Choir in Swansea, the oldest continuously singing Welsh choir, dating from 1895. The choir sang at Terfel's wedding in 2019.

== Faenol Festival ==
In 2000 Terfel founded the Faenol Festival (known in Welsh as "Gŵyl y Faenol"), at the Faenol Estate near Snowdonia, Wales. Billed as "Bryn Terfel's Faenol Festival" (often referred to as "BrynFest") turned into an annual music festival featuring internationally famous opera singers as well as popular Welsh artists. In the same year he released We'll Keep a Welcome – The Welsh Album, an anthology of favourite traditional songs. The festival had been voted a £250,000 grant by the Welsh Assembly, but did not take place in 2009 or 2010 and ended as of 2010. Subsequently, the 2012 Faenol Festival took place in London.

== Operatic repertoire ==
Terfel has performed the following roles on stage:

Composer	Opera	Role	In repertoire	Recorded
Britten	Peter Grimes	Balstrode	1995	No
Canepa	Riccardo III	Riccardo III	2018	
Donizetti	L'elisir d'amore	Dulcamara	2001	Yes (DVD)
Donizetti	Don Pasquale	Don Pasquale	2019	
Gounod	Faust	Mephistopheles	2004	Yes (DVD)
Mozart	Così fan tutte	Guglielmo	1991	No
Mozart	Don Giovanni	Masetto	1992	Yes
Mozart	Don Giovanni	Leporello	1991–present	Yes
Mozart	Don Giovanni	Don Giovanni	1999–present	Yes (DVD)
Mozart	Die Zauberflöte	Speaker	1991	No
Mozart	Le nozze di Figaro	Figaro	1991–2007	Yes (DVD)
Mussorgsky	Boris Godunov	Boris Godunov	2016	
Offenbach	Les contes d'Hoffmann	Four Villains	2000	Yes (DVD)
Puccini	Gianni Schicchi	Gianni Schicchi	2007	No
Puccini	Tosca	Scarpia		Yes
Puccini	Madama Butterfly	Sharpless	1996	No
R. Strauss	Die Frau ohne Schatten	Der Geisterbote	1992	Yes
R. Strauss	Salome	Jochanaan	1993	Yes
Sondheim	Sweeney Todd	Sweeney Todd	2002–present	Yes: Live From Lincoln Center
Stravinsky	The Rake's Progress	Nick Shadow	1996–2000	Yes
Stravinsky	Oedipus Rex	Creon	1992	Yes
Verdi	Falstaff	Falstaff	1999–present	Yes
Verdi	Falstaff	Ford	1993	Yes
Wagner	Das Rheingold	Donner	1993	No
Wagner	Das Rheingold	Wotan	2005–present	Yes (DVD and Blu-ray)
Wagner	Die Walküre	Wotan	2005–present	Yes (DVD and Blu-ray)
Wagner	Siegfried	The Wanderer	2011–present	Yes (DVD and Blu-ray)
Wagner	Tannhäuser	Wolfram	1998	No
Wagner	Der fliegende Holländer	Holländer	2006–present	Yes (DVD and Blu-ray)
Wagner	Die Meistersinger von Nürnberg	Hans Sachs	2010	Concert staging of Welsh National Opera production broadcast by BBC Radio 3 and BBC Four television as part of BBC Proms

== See also ==
- List of Welsh musicians
