= Jack Perrett =

Welsh musician

- Born: Jack Lloyd Perrett; 1993 (age 32–33)
- Origin: Newport, Wales
- Genres: Indie rock and roll
- Years active: 2015–present
- Label: Self published
- Website: facebook.com/JackPerrettMusic

Jack Perrett is a Welsh indie rock and roll musician from Newport, Wales, who has been performing live since 2014, and who released his first EP in 2015. He is self published but linked to the This Feeling label and the Horizons Gorwelion scheme.

His music has been described as "conjuring up visions of Jake Bugg, early Oasis, and rock titans The Jam."

== History ==
Perrett had a wide ranging childhood with interests including rugby for Pill Harriers RFC, football for St. Julian's, and tennis for Firbank Dale Club. He studied at Durham Road Primary School, St Julian’s High School, and studied a sports degree at university.

He cites his dad as an influence for finding music from a young age, surrounded by the sounds of Deep Purple, Black Sabbath, Led Zeppelin, and The Jam.

== Music career ==
He did not begin performing live until age 21, when he performed at St Julian’s Rugby Club, in July 2014, which he describes as making without a PA system, to a sympathetic audience.

Perrett made his debut with the EP "What You Saying?", And its A-side titled "Me And You" was featured on ITV1’s This Morning television programme.

He draws heavily on Britpop and Oasis influences, having previously busked at Liam Gallagher's debut Brixton solo gig, and having performed a cover of "I Wanna Be Adored" on BBC Radio Wales in support of the One Love Manchester Charity concert.

His 2017 single "In the Morning" was produced and contributed to by Steffan Pringle of Estrons, and featured an appearance from Monico Blonde . It was selected for BBC Radio Wales by Janice Long, who included the song for playlist inclusion for four weeks, as well as receiving airtime from Huw Stephens nationally on BBC Radio 1.

Wales Online journalist David Owens named Perrett in his "100 Greatest Welsh Songs of 2016" longlist, including another of the EP tracks, "Drunk And Stoned" in his Wales Online "Top 100 welsh songs of 2016" playlist.

Perrett was named in the final six of the Aloft Hotels/Universal Music Group "Project: Aloft Star" competition, performing to industry experts including BBC Radio 1 presenter Huw Stephens, Sian Anderson of BBC Radio 1Xtra, and Spector frontman Fred Macpherson.

Performing live, he is joined by a band, and in the studio has been mentored by Estrons member Steffan Pringle, who also works with rising Welsh musicians The Himalayas and Adwaith.

In August 2018 he performed at Le Pub in support of the Newport sports team Riot City Ravens. The same month, Perrett launched the single "Portlife", a Newport take on Blur's 1994 hit "Parklife", through an innovative city tour which involved performances at popular local sites including Alonzi Fish Bar, Chessmen, Tiny Rebel's city centre brewbar, The Gallery Space at Newport Market, and outside the gates of Rodney Parade, where he performed before the kick off of his boyhood football team Newport County. There, he watched the fixture against Crewe Alexandra and then completed the day with gigs at The Ivy Bush bar and El Sieco's.

Portlife received significant viral attention and coverage on social media after it was shared by Wales Online. The song is frequently played at Rodney Parade during pre-match build-up to Newport County home fixtures.

In November 2017 he performed at the anniversary celebrations for the Newport Rising, at an event named "Newport Rising", which saw events take place in front of the Westgate Hotel, and activities held by Our Chartist Heritage including film exhibits at the Riverfront Arts Centre and a reenactment march on the city centre streets. Perrett performed at a live show at Tiny Rebel Brewbar in the city.

His single "Pressure" was released in May 2019, and was described as "a mouthy cousin of Jake Bugg and Oasis, (which) has already garnered comparisons to those names as well as The Stone Roses and Kasabian."

Perrett performed with Horizons Gorwelion at the 2019 Great Escape Festival in Brighton.

Perrett is promoted by the This Feeling label and campaign, who are backed by Liam Gallagher and The Libertines. He was named to This Feeling's "Big in 2019" list.

He was named to the 2019 Horizons Gorwelion list, backed by BBC Cymru Wales, Arts Council of Wales, and presenter/curator Bethan Elfyn.

== Production ==
=== Members ===
- Jack Perrett - guitar and vocals (2014–present)

Live band

- Morgan Wicks - drums (2017–present)
- Dan Burridge - bass (2018–present)
- Rhys Jones - bass (2017)

Production

- Steffan Pringle (2017–present)

== Discography ==
=== Singles ===
Year	Title	Label	Album
2017	"What You Saying?" (EP): "What You Saying?"; "Me and You"; "Drunk and Stoned"; "I've Got It All but I Want More"	Jack Perrett/Jack Perrett Records	
2017	"No Time for Me"	Jack Perrett/Jack Perrett Records	
2017	"In the Morning"	Jack Perrett Records	
2018	"Nothing for Anyone / The Full Jonty": "Nothing for Anyone"; "The Full Jonty"	Jack Perrett/Jack Perrett Records	
2018	"Portlife"	RISE Propaganda/Jack Perrett Records	
2018	"Like a Fever"	Jack Perrett Records	
2019	"Army of Two"	Jack Perrett Records	
2019	"Pressure"	Jack Perrett Records	

== See also ==
- Music of Newport
- Horizons Gorwelion
