= Alffa =

Welsh-language punk–blues music duo

- Origin: Llanrug
- Genres: Rock, Punk blues
- Years active: 2015–present
- Label: Recordiau Côsh Records
- Members: Dion Wyn Jones; Sion Eifion Land
- Website: www.alffaband.com

Alffa (transl. Alpha) are a Welsh language blues rock duo from Llanrug in North Wales, formed in 2015. The group currently consists of Dion Wyn Jones (vocals, guitar) and Sion Eifion Land (drums).

In 2019, streaming platform Spotify stated that the band had become the "most streamed Welsh language act ever" with three million streams for their two singles alone.

== History ==
The band were founded in 2015 by Welsh teenagers Jones and Land, who grew up together in Llanrug, a village ten minutes from the nearby town of Caernarfon. They formed the band while they studied at Coleg Menai. They graduated from sixth form at Ysgol Brynrefail in 2018.

The band received mainstream attention in May 2018 when they were named by BBC Cymru Wales and the Arts Council of Wales in the lineup for the Horizons Gorwelion annual festival, which introduced them as "an exciting teenage two piece rock n roll band from Llanrug who are inspired by the blues."

The Horizons Gorwelion festival was first established by BBC broadcaster Bethan Elfyn. The lineup was selected by figures from PRS for Music, Moshi Moshi Records, and Drowned in Sound.

In August 2018 the band performed at Festival N°6 in Portmeirion.

The band cite their influences as The Black Keys, The White Stripes, The Arcs, Black Pistol Fire, Jimi Hendrix, Tymbal, and Jack White.

In November 2018 the band received unexpected media coverage after they were included by Spotify's playlist curators in South America, leading to their single Gwenwyn (English: poison) receiving over 850,000 streams and an international listenership. The attention was a result of the band joining international distributors PYST (funded by the Welsh Government) who provide Welsh musicians with label services, digital distribution, playlist inclusion, physical distribution internationally, as well as bookings for shows and tours with promoters and venues globally.

Gwenwyn went on to become the first Welsh language single to receive over one million streams, in December 2018. They were reported in The Guardian and the national front page of BBC News Online.

In 2019 the band were featured on BBC Radio 4's "Art of Now: Cymru Rising" programme which highlighted the growth of Welsh language artists, dubbed Cool Cymru 2.0.

The band are recording their first album following the success of their digital releases, and are also planning international performances. They are to perform at Sŵn festival in October 2019 alongside Gruff Rhys, The Comet Is Coming, and Nilüfer Yanya.

== Band members ==
=== Current ===
- Dion Wyn Jones - vocals, guitar (2015–present)
- Sion Eifion Land - drums (2015–present)

== Discography ==
=== Singles ===
Year	Title	Label	Album
2018	"Creadur"	Rasal Miwsig	
2018	Sesiwn Radio Cymru: "Tomos Rhys"; "13.11.15"; "Mwgwd - Acwstig"	Independent release	
2018	"Gwenwyn"	Recordiau Côsh Records	"Rhyddid o’r Cysgodion Gwenwynig / Freedom from the Poisonous Shadows"
2019	"Pla"	Recordiau Côsh Records	"Rhyddid o’r Cysgodion Gwenwynig / Freedom from the Poisonous Shadows"
2019	"Full Moon Vulture"	Recordiau Côsh Records	"Rhyddid o’r Cysgodion Gwenwynig / Freedom from the Poisonous Shadows"

=== Albums ===
Year	Title	Label
2019	"Rhyddid o’r Cysgodion Gwenwynig / Freedom from the Poisonous Shadows"	Recordiau Côsh Records
2024	"O'r Lludw / From Ashes"	Recordiau Côsh Records
