= Climbing Trees =

Welsh band

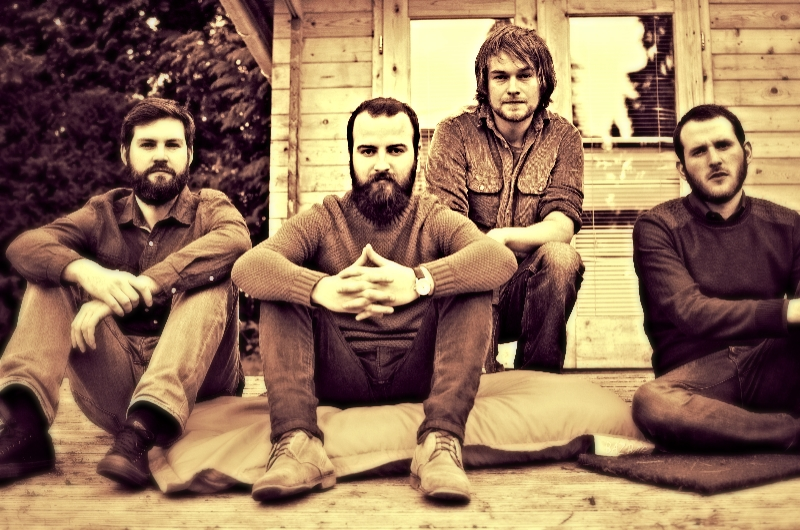
- Climbing Trees at BBC Cymru Wales, April 2014 (l-r) James Bennetts, Matthew Frederick, Colenso Jones, Martin Webb

Background information
- Origin: Pontypridd, Wales
- Genres: 'Cymrucana', folk, alternative rock
- Years active: 2011–present
- Labels: Staylittle Music
- Members: Matthew Frederick; Colenso Jones; Martin Webb; James Bennetts
- Past members: Justin Preece; Hywel Mills; Gareth 'Barney' Barnby
- Website: ilikeclimbingtrees.com

Climbing Trees are a Welsh four-piece "Cymrucana" band based in Pontypridd, South Wales. The group currently features Matthew Frederick (piano/guitar/vocals), Colenso Jones (guitar/bass/vocals), Martin Webb (guitar/bass/vocals) and James Bennetts (drums/vocals).

== History ==
Formed in 2011, the band soon came to the attention of BBC Radio Wales as work on their first release progressed, being named BBC Introducing Band of the Week in February 2013 after supporting New York group Spin Doctors the previous month. Shortly after, the band appeared as part of BBC Radio Wales Music Day, before Single of the Week (for Aloisi) and Welsh Artist of the Week recognition followed in August 2013. In October of the same year, the band were hand-picked by Jamie Cullum as the support act for the Cardiff leg of his Momentum tour.

The band recorded their debut album Hebron at Mwnci Studios in Carmarthenshire between May 2012 and February 2013, releasing it in August. The album was described as "an essential purchase for 2013" by the BBC's Bethan Elfyn; New Sound Wales deemed the record "one of the most impressive albums of 2013"; and Wales Online described the album as "majestic", listing "pure blown gospel standout" track Burning Candle amongst "The 51 greatest Welsh pop records of 2013".

In April 2014, Climbing Trees were announced as one of the twelve BBC Horizons Gorwelion acts for 2014–2015. They've toured performed around the UK and performed at various festivals, including Green Man, Laugharne and Festival N°6.

The band's second album, Borders, was released in July 2016 on Matthew Frederick's label Staylittle Music. It was again recorded at Mwnci Studios. Preceding it were the singles Graves and Tracks. The album was nominated for the 2015-2016 Welsh Music Prize.

== Cymrucana ==
The band's sound has often been described as "Cymrucana". 'A nod to both the Cool Cymru explosion of the 1990s and the ever-popular folk-rock genre Americana', the term was apparently invented and perpetuated by the band themselves. In a March 2014 interview with New Sound Wales, Frederick described:

The great thing about this band is that each member was coming from a different place musically, where we started introducing one another to different bands and artists, and I think this is reflected in what is now our signature sound. Before long we were being asked by local press and just people in general how we'd describe our music, which at the time was a vague mixture of folk, country and Americana. None of these seemed to accurately define us though, so 'Cymrucana' was originally a tongue-in-cheek comment that became our standard response to the question, and a way of defining the band without really saying anything at all. The truth is that the 'Cymrucana' scene consists solely of Climbing Trees. We're quite open to other bands and artists joining us though, if they so wish….

On the band's sound, BBC Radio Wales presenter Adam Walton said: "They've managed to transplant the musical heart of America – The Band, Crosby, Stills & Nash, Grizzly Bear – to their spiritual home ... without missing a beat", while a 2014 review noted that "you could be forgiven for thinking this was a band from Los Angeles rather than Pontypridd".

== Discography ==
=== Albums ===
- Hebron (Released 30 August 2013, CD/DL, Staylittle Music SLM002)
- Borders (Released 8 July 2016, CD/DL, Staylittle Music SLM010)

=== EPs ===
- Borders: Acoustic B Sides (Released 8 July 2018, MC/DL, Staylittle Music SLM015)

=== Singles ===
- "Graves" (Released 27 November 2015, CD/DL, Staylittle Music SLM005)
- "Tracks" (Released 1 April 2016, CD/DL, Staylittle Music SLM008)
- "Amber" (Released 23 November 2016, CD/DL, Staylittle Music SLM011)
- "Lost" (Released 19 May 2017, CD/DL, Staylittle Music SLM012)
- "Fall" (Released 4 August 2017, 7"/DL, Staylittle Music SLM013)
- "Troubling Times" (Released 30 April 2021, DL, Staylittle Music SLM023)
