= Himalayas (band) =

Welsh rock band

HIMALAYAS
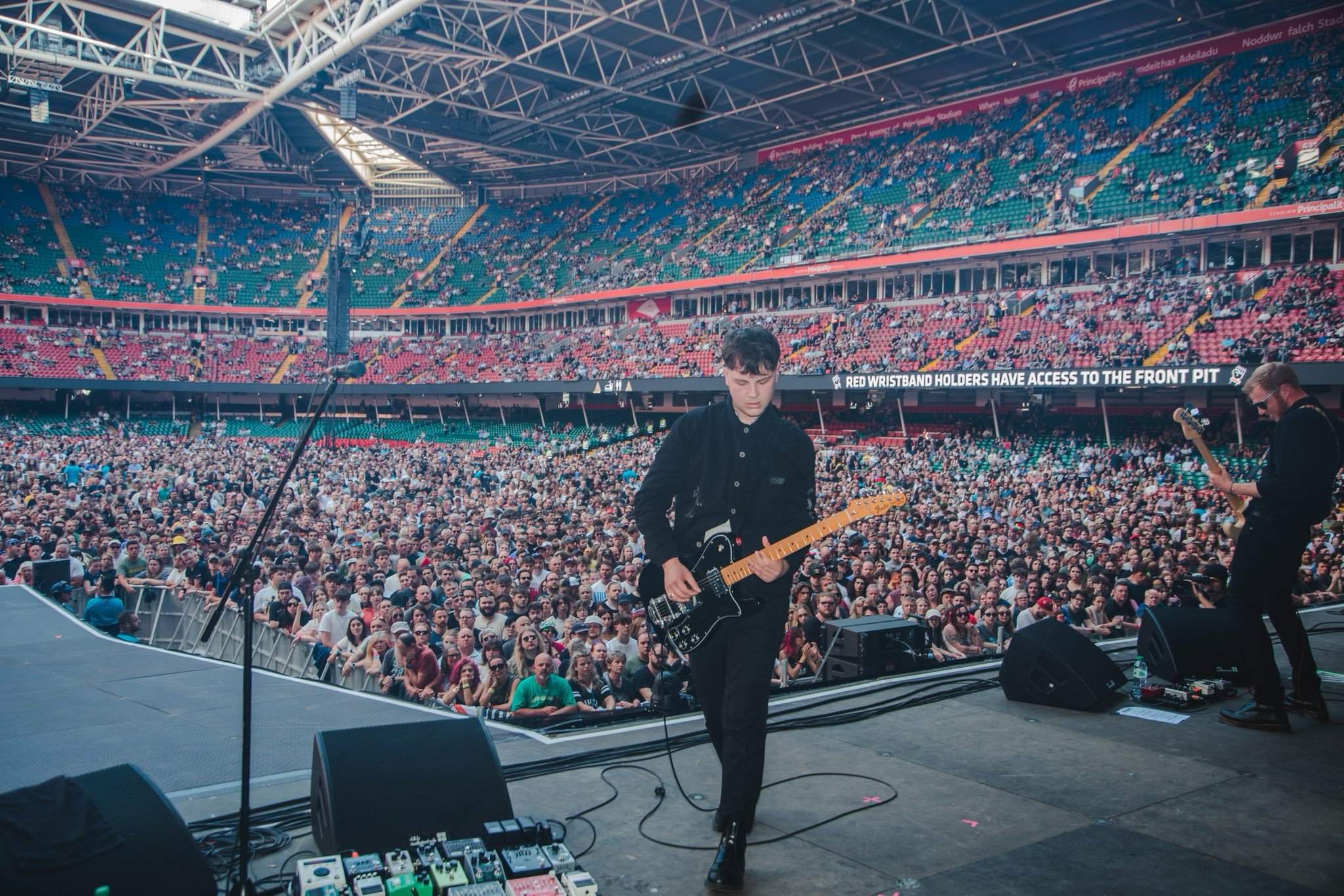
- Himalayas performing in 2024 at Cardiff

Background information
- Origin: Cardiff, Wales
- Genres: Rock, indie rock, garage rock
- Years active: 2015–present
- Label: Nettwerk Music Group
- Members: Joe Williams; Mike Griffiths; Louis Heaps; James Goulbourn
- Website: himalayasofficial.com

Himalayas are a Welsh rock group from Cardiff, Wales, formed in 2015. The group currently consists of Mike Griffiths (lead guitar, backing vocals), Joe Williams (rhythm guitar, lead vocals), Louis Heaps (bass), and James Goulbourn (drums).

== History ==
Goulbourn, Griffiths, and Williams all met in school and were later joined in the group by Heaps, who was an acquaintance of Goulbourn. The group cite interests from The Beatles, Otis Redding, Kelly Jones, Green Day, John Bonham, and Cher.

The band began producing music on SoundCloud in July 2016, with their first track titled "Cheap Thrills". This was followed a few months later by their debut EP release Ecstasy, featuring "How Do You Sleep", and "Intoxicate Me". The group began touring at venues including Clwb Ifor Bach for Cardiff University's Xpresstival, Warehouse 54 in Newport, and Fiddler's Elbow in Camden. The band have been managed since August 2018 by Stephanie Brennan; formerly of WME and Kobalt Records; and James Brennan, both of whom are based with the Dark Horses agency.

The band's music is largely written by Griffiths and Williams and the band have worked closely with former Estrons member Steffan Pringle, who also works with rising Welsh names Adwaith and fronts Alternative Rock band Death Cult Electric.

The band drew attention with the release of their track "Thank God I'm Not You" in 2017. BBC Cymru Wales presenter Adam Walton reportedly called the band for permission to play the track on air within a day of its release, and the band went on to appear on BBC Radio 1 with Edith Bowman, Virgin Radio, Amazing Radio, and Radio X, with the track named by the latter as the This Feeling Track Of The Week for the week commencing 8 January 2018. The 2019 single "The Masquerade" was released independently.

The band toured extensively in 2018 with appearances at BBC Music Introducing Stage at Reading and Leeds Festival, Isle of Wight Festival, the BBC Music Introducing/PRS for Music stage at South by Southwest 2018, Cardiff Sŵn Festival, the Horizons Gorwelion stage at Festival N°6, a two venue run with Kaiser Chiefs, and sets at Truck Festival, Y Not Festival, Tramlines Festival, HOYfest, and a headline set at Nambuccapalooza in London.

The band announced their 2019 single, "The Masquerade", during their BBC Radio 2 debut on the Johnnie Walker show, which will be their first independent release after leaving their previous label. In 2020 Himalayas signed to Wild Music Management who have worked with Manic Street Preachers, AC/DC, Pink, and Courteeners.

In mid-2021, the Himalayas had their a debut TV performance at The Hundreds on BBC Sport. September 2021 saw Himalayas embarking on a headline tour which started with a sold-out show at The Globe in their hometown of Cardiff and ended with another sold-out show at The Garage in London. Himalayas supported Manic Street Preachers for two shows in September and December 2021.

In May 2022 Himalayas announced via their social media page that they had signed a worldwide record deal to Nettwerk Records. Himalayas released their debut album From Hell To Here on 12 May 2023. In March 2024, Himalayas released their single "V.O.V", which was a collaboration with Brian Johnson and produced by Dan Lancaster.

In June 2024, Himalayas supported Foo Fighters during their Everything or Nothing at All Tour at the Principality Stadium. On 25 April 2025, Himalayas released their second album, Bad Star.

== Band members ==
=== Current ===
- Joe Williams - lead vocals, rhythm guitar (2015–present)
- Mike Griffiths - lead guitar, backing vocals (2015–present)
- Louis Heaps - bass (2015–present)
- James Goulbourn - drums (2015–present)

== Discography ==
=== Studio albums ===
- From Hell to Here (2023)
- Bad Star (2025)

=== Extended plays ===
- Ecstasy (2016)

=== Singles ===
Year	Title	Label	EP | Album
2017	Thank God I'm Not You	Peepshow Records	
2017	Sigh on a Hurricane	Peepshow Records	
2018	If I Tell You	Peepshow Records	
2019	The Masquerade	Independent	
2020	We Love to Hate	Independent	
2022	Alone; Out of the Dark and Into the Light; From Hell To Here	Nettwerk Music Group	From Hell To Here - LP
2023	Into the Trap; Leave This Place	Nettwerk Music Group	From Hell To Here - LP
2024	V.O.V.	Nettwerk Music Group	
2024	Hung Up; Cave Paintings; What If...? Nothing Higher	Nettwerk Music Group	Bad Star - LP
2025	Afterlife; Surrender	Nettwerk Music Group	Bad Star - LP
