= Horizons (Wales) =

Welsh music scheme

Gorwelion Horizons
- Genre: Various
- Dates: Year-round
- Location: Across Wales
- Years active: 2014–present
- Website: www.bbc.co.uk/horizons

Horizons (Welsh: Gorwelion) is an arts scheme and music festival launched jointly in 2014 by BBC Cymru Wales and the Arts Council of Wales to develop new independent contemporary music artists. It is curated by BBC presenter Bethan Elfyn.

The scheme hosts a yearly showcase, but also displays its artists through slots at major domestic and international festivals, as well as securing studio access at the likes of Rockfield and Maida Vale.

== Editions ==
=== 2014 ===
In February 2014, the scheme was launched and first took part in the National Eisteddfod in Llanelli, promoting artists including musician Chris Jones on the Llwyfan Perfformio.

In May 2014, Horizons was named as 'Horizons 12' and announced the first twelve artists for the inceptive event. Over 300 applicants were reviewed by the scheme, and among the final artists were:

- Candelas - an indie rock group from Llanuwchllyn, in Gwynedd
- Casi Wyn - a singer songwriter from Bangor, based in London
- Chris Jones - a Welsh and Celtic folk singer from Cwm-y-glo, near Caernarfon
- Kizzy Crawford - a Welsh language singer songwriter of Bajan heritage from Merthyr Tydfil
- Plu - an alternative folk sibling trio from Snowdonia
- Sŵnami - an indie rock group from Dolgellau
- Baby Queens
- Climbing Trees
- Gabrielle Murphy
- Houdini Dax
- Seazoo
- The People The Poet

=== 2015 ===
In 2015, the scheme began the year with involvement in the inaugural X Music Festival which took place in June in Bute Park, Cardiff.

The 2015 edition of Horizons was held at the Chapter Arts Centre in Canton, Cardiff, and at the Swn Festival at the various venues (including Clwb Ifor Bach) on Womanby Street in the city.

2015 featured group Cut Ribbons would go on to be highlighted by the Fred Perry 'Subculture' campaign for their track We Want to Watch Something We Loved Burn.

Among the artists named were:

- A six-member band led by Aled Rheon, brother of Iwan Rheon
- Dan Bettridge
- Hannah Grace - a Welsh singer songwriter from Bridgend
- Peasant's King
- Mellt
- Violet Skies, a singer songwriter from Chepstow, Monmouthshire
- Yr Eira
- HMS Morris
- Y Reu
- Delyth McLean
- Cold Committee
- Cut Ribbons

=== 2016 ===
2016 saw events showcasing bands from across Wales, with events hosted at Moon Club on Womanby Street, as well as at the DimSwn event. The scheme also participated in Festival N°6, on the Lost in the Woods Stage.

Artists Danielle Lewis and David Ian Roberts were also covered on Folk Radio for their releases that year, which were recorded as a result of BBC and Arts Council funding.

- Afro Cluster - a Cardiff-based collective of musicians from all over South Wales
- ANELOG
- CASEY
- CaStLeS - a psychedelic pop trio from Llanrug
- Connah Evans
- Danielle Lewis - a singer-songwriter from New Quay
- Fleur De Lys
- Reuel Elijah - a hip-hop/R&B singer from Cardiff
- Roughion
- Tibet
- We're No Heroes
- Ysgol Sul - a three piece from Llandeilo

=== 2018 ===
The 2018 festival saw a showcase at the Portmeirion Festival N°6 event, including NoGood Boyo, Alffa, Campfire Social, and a headline slot for I See Rivers.

The scheme also exhibited at The Great Escape Festival in Brighton, from The Last Music Bar. It saw performances from Boy Azooga, CHROMA, Mrphy, The Gentle Good, Nia Wyn, Rachel K Collier, Trampolene, The Himalayas, and Dream State.

The year also saw engagements with Welsh Language Music Day at Gower College in Swansea, and in the audience were a range of attendees including Newport rap group Goldie Lookin' Chain.

The year's selection made a notable decision to select a number of female musicians (consisting of 10 of the 12 person line up) and including artists from indie, reggae, rock, folk and blues genres.

The scheme invited Adwaith, Alffa, Aleighcia Scott, Campfire Social, Marged, Nia Wyn, and I See Rivers to all perform and record at Rockfield Studios (of Queen and Oasis fame)., as well as hosting a performance at Tramshed, Cardiff with Himalayas.

- Adwaith
- Aleighcia Scott
- Alffa
- Campfire Social
- CHROMA
- Eädyth
- Himalayas
- I See Rivers
- Marged
- Nia Wyn
- Nogood Boyo
- The Pitchforks

=== 2019 ===
The lineup for the 2019 edition was announced in June, described as including "a dreamy indie-pop band whose music has appeared on Black Mirror and Made in Chelsea, an electro teenage pop artist, a live rock, rap and reggae group, a jazz singer, a dance producer and one of the fastest banjo players in Wales."

The artwork for the event was commissioned to Welsh artist Cadi Lane, and installed along Womanby Street.

- Codewalkers
- Darren Eedens & The Slim Pickin's
- Endaf
- Esther
- Eve Goodman
- Gwilym
- Hana2k
- Jack Perrett
- Kidsmoke
- Rosehip Teahouse
- Sera
- Y Cledrau

=== 2022 ===
The lineup for the 2022 edition was announced in February and received its largest ever funding since its launch.

- Alice Low
- Anwar Sizbar
- Aisha Kigs
- Alekxsandr
- Asha Jane
- Bandicoot
- The Bug Club
- Chasing Shadows
- Celavi
- Clwb Fuzz
- Cerys Hafana
- CI Gofod
- Cupsofte
- Gwenno Morgan
- Hana Lili
- Hemes
- Teddy Hunter
- James and the Cold Gun
- K(E)NZ
- Kinnigan
- Kim Hon
- Harry Jowett
- LEMFRECK
- Lloydy Lew
- Luke RV
- Mace The Great
- Malan
- Mali Hâf
- Mantaraybryn
- Mirari More
- Niques
- Panta Ray
- Rebecca Hurn
- Roman Yasin
- Skylark
- Soren Araujo
- Sybs
- Su Sang Song
- Szwe
- Tara Bandito
- Tapestri
- Thallo
- Winger Records
- Wobbli Boi
- Want
- Voya
- Yazmean
- XL Life

== See also ==
- Music of Cardiff
- Music of Newport
- Music of Wales
- Culture and recreation in Cardiff
- Huw Stephens
- Bethan Elfyn
- Welsh language
