= Cool Cymru =

Era of culture, music, politics and art

Cool Cymru (Welsh: Cŵl Cymru) was a Welsh cultural movement in the 1990s and 2000s. The movement saw a rise in the popularity of Welsh music, with bands such as Catatonia, Manic Street Preachers, Stereophonics and Super Furry Animals, many of which were adjacent to the Britpop and post-Britpop movements. It also saw developments in Welsh politics, sport, visual art and TV and film.

Cool Cymru is often seen as more of a wide-ranging movement than its British equivalent, lasting well into the twenty-first century. Some commentators have linked the movement to a new cultural confidence in the nation and a more positive view of Wales outside the country while others have criticised it as homogenous and jingoistic.

== Terminology ==
The term Cool Cymru (Cymru is the Welsh name for Wales) derives as a Welsh alternative to Cool Britannia (itself a pun on the British patriotic song "Rule, Britannia!"). Cool Britannia described the revival of British art and culture in the mid-1990s which was typically more centred on London and England, emphasised British culture, and used British symbols such as The Union Jack.

The term Cool Cymru gained popularity for the cultural figures and phenomena which were specifically Welsh or Welsh in origin, and continued to be used by Welsh and British commentators long after the term Cool Britannia has fallen out of favour. By 1998 many Welsh cultural figures were gaining prominence across the UK, at a time when the use of Cool Britannia was already falling out of favour.

== Politics ==
Commentators have alluded to both Cool Britannia and Cool Cymru as by-products of social and economic issues that dominated the UK in the 1970s and 1980s. In Wales, this era saw the rejection of a devolved Welsh government in a 1979 referendum and the shift in economic policy during the Premiership of Margaret Thatcher; which led to the 1984 Miners' Strike) and the eventual closure of collieries throughout the UK. This resulted in an era of unprecedented turmoil in the south Wales Valleys, with unemployment rates ranking amongst the highest in the whole United Kingdom well into the twenty-first century.

A landslide victory for the Labour party in the 1997 United Kingdom general election in Wales was followed by the success of the 1997 Welsh devolution referendum just four months later.

1997 United Kingdom general election in Wales saw the rise of New Labour and a landslide victory for Welsh Labour, winning 34 of 40 Welsh constituencies, a result which also saw the Welsh Conservatives lose all of their MPs, leaving them without Welsh representation for the first time since the 1906 general election. The new Labour government had promised another vote on devolution for Wales in its manifesto, with a referendum being held shortly after the UK election on 18 September 1997. The new referendum saw a reversal of the 1979 result, with a narrow win in favour of establishing a new Government of Wales.

Five months after referendum, the band Catatonia released their album, International Velvet, and would perform the album's title track at the opening ceremonies of both the new government and the 1999 Rugby World Cup. The contemporary anthem would also be used by the BBC for sports trailers and was used to illustrate a post-referendum national confidence by academics and commentators both inside and outside of Wales as an example of Cool Cymru.

== Music culture ==
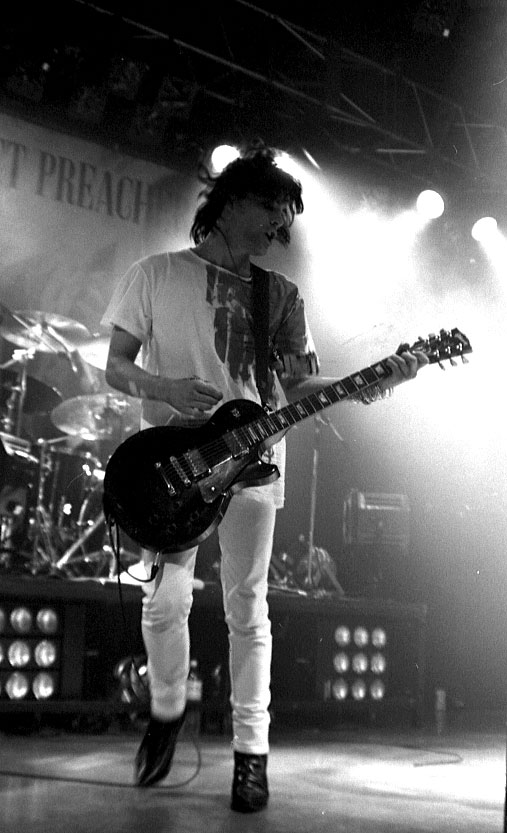
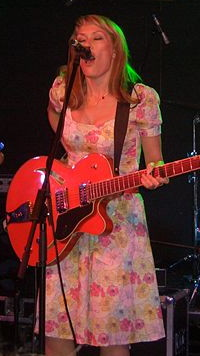
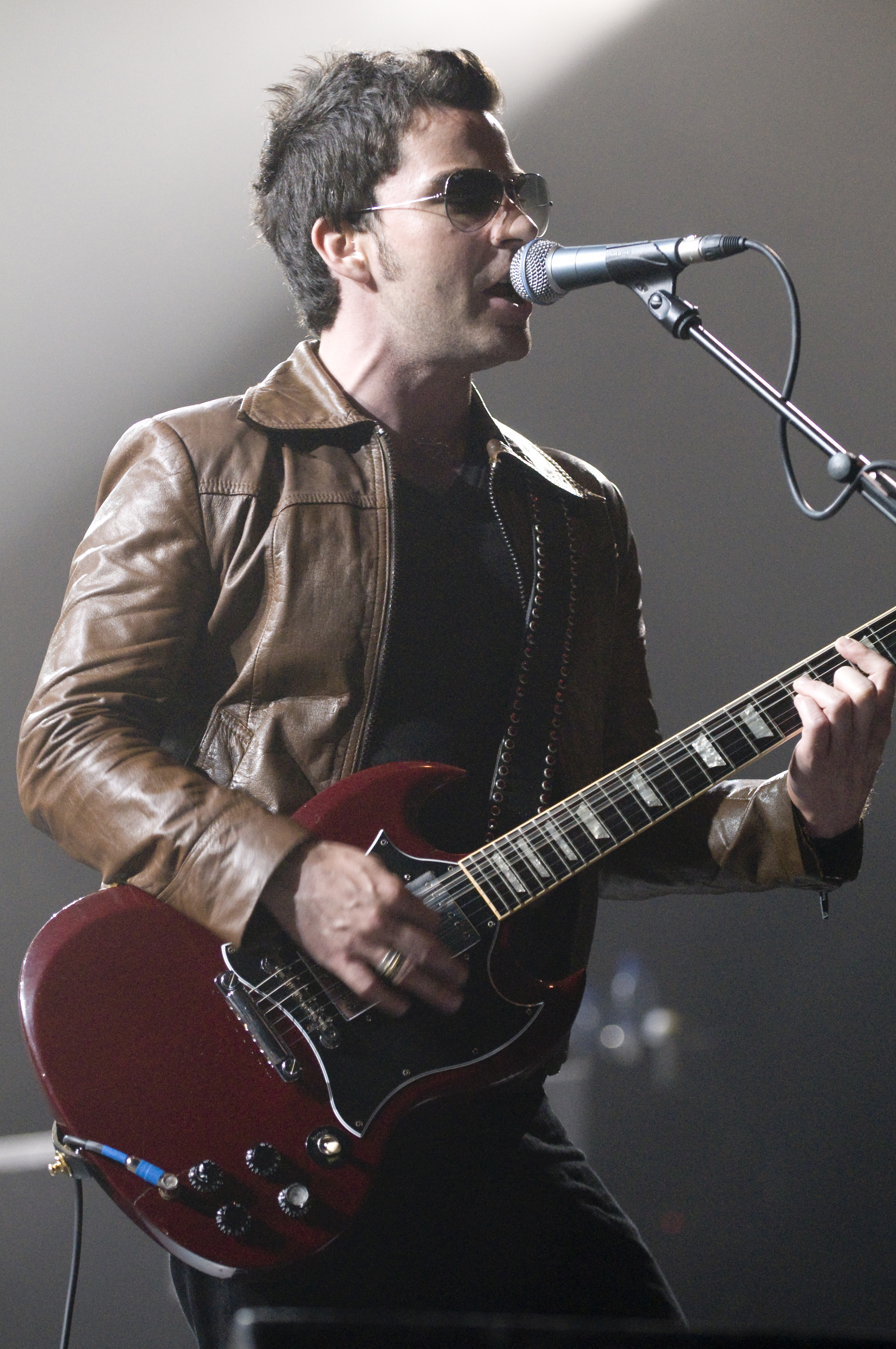
Music icons of Cool Cymru: Richey Edwards of the Manic Street Preachers, Cerys Matthews of Catatonia and Kelly Jones of The Stereophonics.

The economic decline of Wales in the 1980s was mirrored in the era's music. While artists such as Shakin' Stevens achieved great success and became the UK's top selling artist of the decade, his Rockabilly persona and musicality were a deliberate attempt to evoke nostalgia in an older generation, familiar with American culture and music of the 1950s.

With a few notable exceptions (such as the celebrated Rockfield Studios), there were few professional facilities within Wales before Cool Cymru and the market necessary to sustain a professional touring scene remained centred on London and Britain as a whole. This changed in the 1990s when acts from the two popular music traditions in Wales (which until that time, had both been equally ignored by the British mainstream press) emerged onto the UK anglophone market under the banner of "Cool Cymru". Iain Ellis describes these two traditions as "self-consciously Welsh Acts" (such as Super Furry Animals, Gorky's Zygotic Mynci, and Catatonia) and "neither eschewing nor celebrating Welsh Acts" (Manic Street Preachers, Stereophonics, and Mclusky). Outside of the UK, Welsh music was still associated with "old-fashioned crooners" such as Shirley Bassey and Tom Jones, both of whom would reinvent themselves as part of the Cool Cymru movement.

In 1997 Shirley Bassey released History Repeating in collaboration with the English electro duo Propellerheads. The single reached No. 1 on the UK Indie Chart and No. 10 on the US Dance Club Songs chart, marking Bassey's first top ten appearance on any US chart since 1973. This was followed in 1999 by Jones' own career resurgence following the success of his Reload album, which saw Jones collaborate with other musicians, many of whom were already established part of "Cool Cymru". The album was commercially successful across the UK, becoming Jones' first number one studio album in thirty years.

As such, any popular Welsh act under the "Cool Cymru" label could now share their own understanding of Welsh identity "beyond their own borders", regardless of the language, musical style or influences they brought.

=== Stereophonics ===
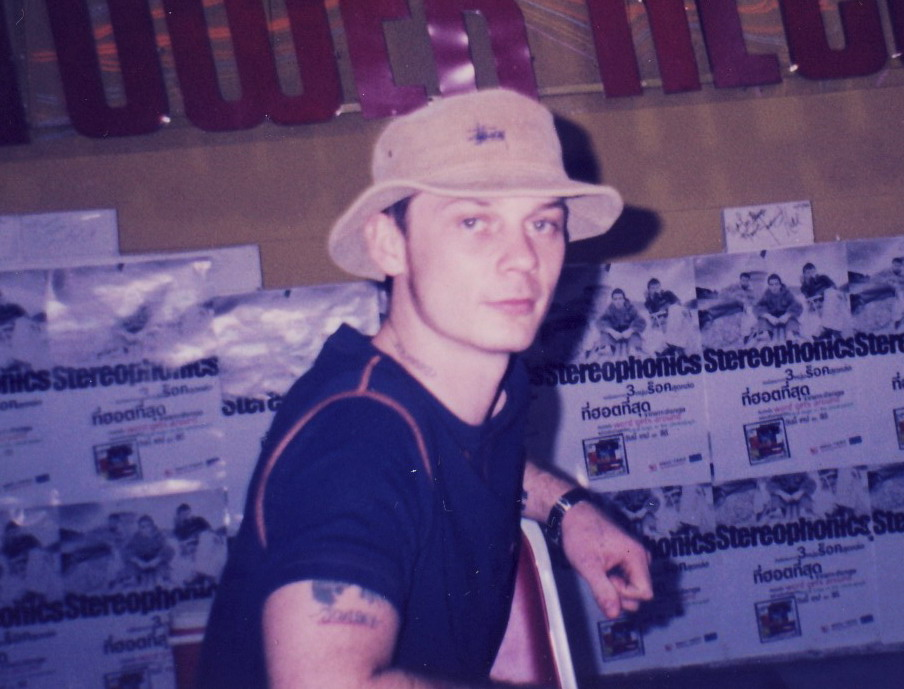
Stereophonics' Richard Jones photographed in Thailand

The Stereophonics' debut album, Word Gets Around, was released in 1997; the band drew attention when they became the first to sign for Richard Branson's V2 Records. The album went on to receive acclaim, with its asking of potent questions for 1990s young people in Wales, including the line from Traffic:

"Is anyone going anywhere?

Everyone's got to be somewhere."

Stereophonics - "Traffic"

Tackling the topic of youth unemployment was also a focus of the era:

"I don't live to work,

I work to live,

I live at the weekend."

Stereophonics - "Last of the Big Time Drinkers"

Writer Griffin Kaye described Stereophonics as "proud, unapologetic Welshmen who serve as the anchormen of the Cool Cymru sound, helping carry the sound from one generation to the next."

=== Super Furry Animals ===
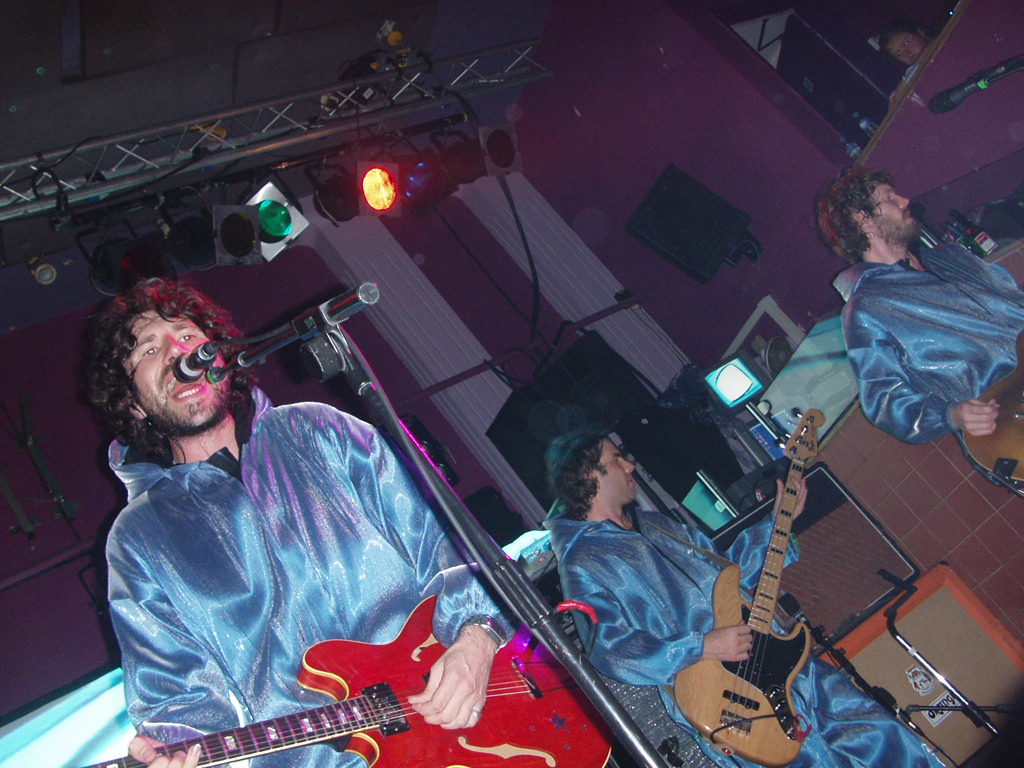
The Super Furry Animals performing in September 2005.

Ellis describes Gruff Rhys' psychedelia driven art as "the heart and soul of the "Cool Cymru" movement", yet he acknowledges it was the act's resonance with the "London-based Britpop movement and its attendant media" which helped its growth, thanks to their dissonance with the more standardised acts of the era such as Oasis. The group famously reached number 11 in the UK charts with Mwng in 2001, to much surprise given the presence of a full ten Welsh language songs on the album.

=== Welsh Music Foundation ===
Pooh Sticks lead singer Huw Williams, who helped raise the profiles of 60 Ft. Dolls and Catatonia, co-founded the Welsh Music Foundation, a now defunct Government supported organisation which in the Cool Cymru era was praised for raising the profile of Welsh music internationally and at home. The organisation is credited with individual successes such as the growth of Lostprophets and Mclusky, as well as bringing BBC Radio 1 on its first visit to Wales for Sound City in Cardiff.

=== Criticism ===
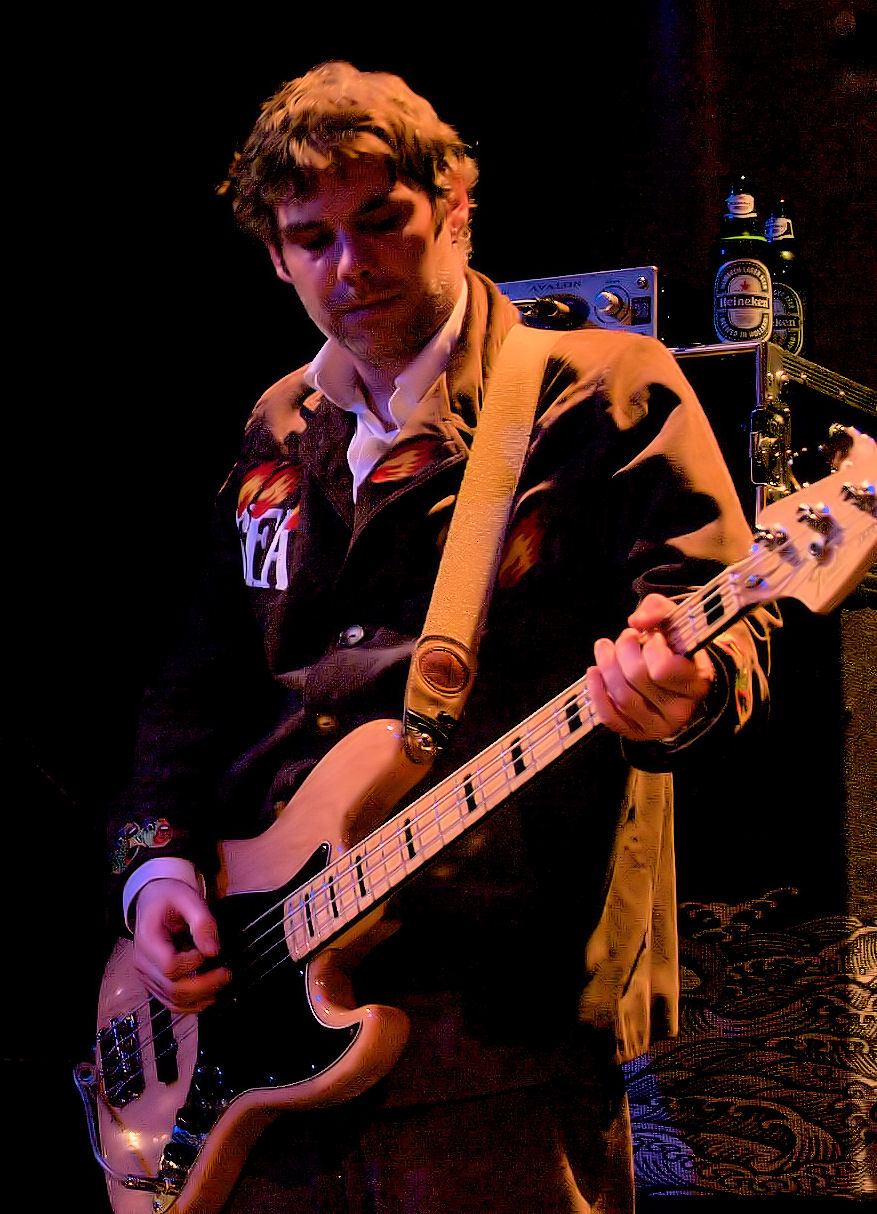
Guto Pryce of the Super Furry Animals was critical of what he called the "flag waving" of the Cool Cymru movement.

Similarly to the Cool Britannia and Britpop movements, elements of Cool Cymru were criticised as jingoistic. The Super Furry Animals bassist, Guto Pryce said: "Britpop was quite a risible scene. We didn’t like the idea of flag waving and we never waved a Welsh flag – it was other people that told everyone we were Welsh. There was a backlash against that scene – and rightfully so."

Issues around the use of the English language by formerly Welsh language bands came to a head at the 1996 Llandeilo Eisteddfod. The Super Furry Animals performed their English language songs by whistling the lyrics and handing out lyric sheets exclusively in Japanese to the crowd. In another venue during the same week, Gorky's Zygotic Mynci also publicly expressed their anger about what they perceived was a form of censorship.

The Stereophonics concert at Morfa Stadium on 31 July 1999 attracted criticism when video footage of famous Welsh rugby triumphs was played to the crowd. The footage included two tries by Gareth Edwards in the 1970s and most controversially, Scott Gibbs' try in Wales' victory over England at Wembley earlier that year. Some English attendees at the concert wrote to NME to complain about the videos which was published on 21 August under the editorial banner "Is Wales the new Germany?" The NME journalist James Oldham even linked the rise in Welsh patriotism and nationalism to a supposed rise in "race related attacks in South Wales." The debate continued elsewhere in UK media, with NME noting that "the Welsh issue" continued to dominate its readers contributions as late as 18 September. NME would review another Stereophonics concert in Cardiff later that same year, although this time the reviewer stated that "only a paranoid English tourist could interpret the crowd’s cries of "Wales, Wales" as hostility" adding that he observed no "chest-beating nationalism."

Writer Iain Ellis declared that "Cool Cymru is dead" in 2010 and noted that the musicians at its peak were placed together "less by common genre than by common geography". Although Ellis also noted that new Welsh acts benefited greatly from the infrastructure that "Cool Cymru" had established.

== Film and TV ==
The long running Welsh language soap opera, Pobl y Cwm found new audiences in The Netherlands, when it was given a primetime broadcast on broadcast by the Nederland 3 channel. The series premiered on 11 August 1992, and was preceded by a promotional film featuring facets of Welsh culture. In 1994 the series again found a new audience, when the BBC broadcast it across the United Kingdom for the first time since 1982 in a daily afternoon slot four times a week.

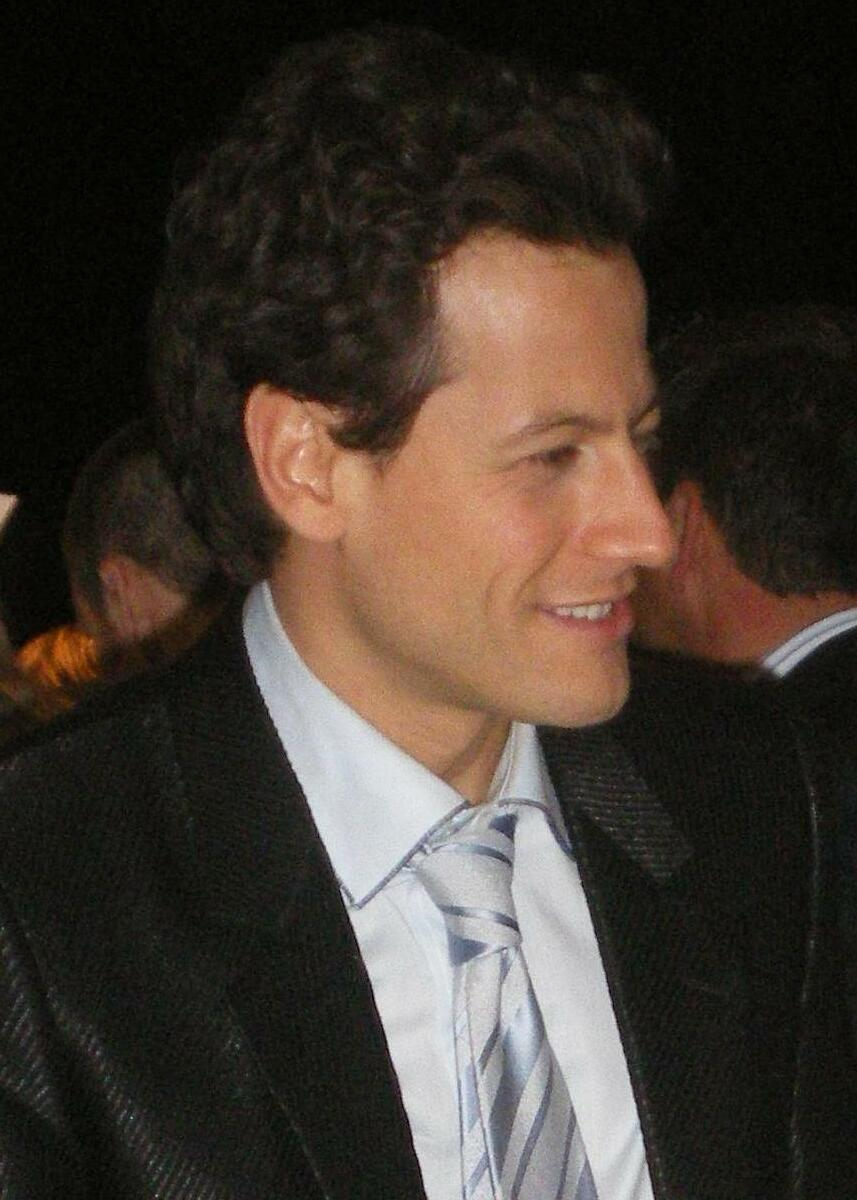
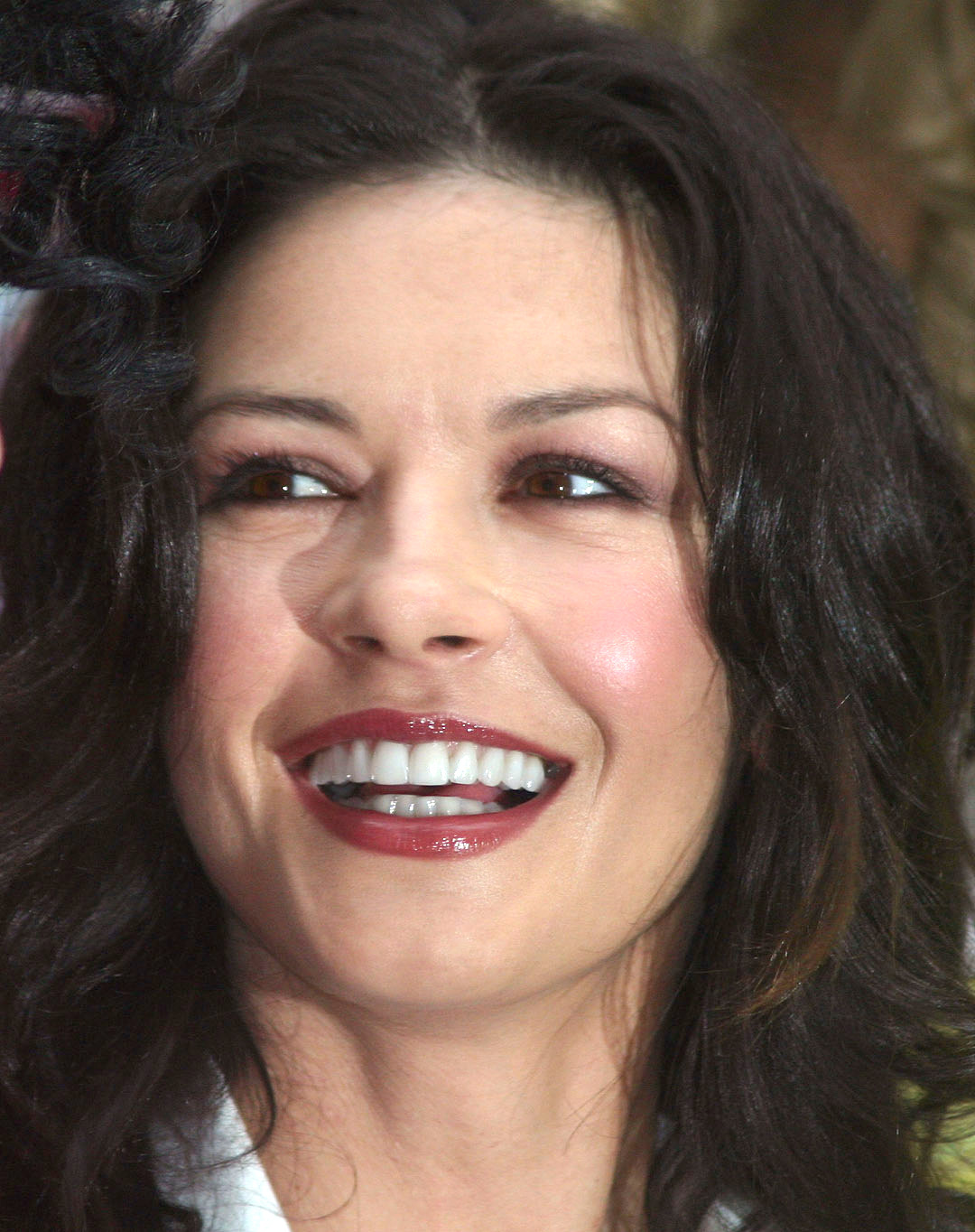
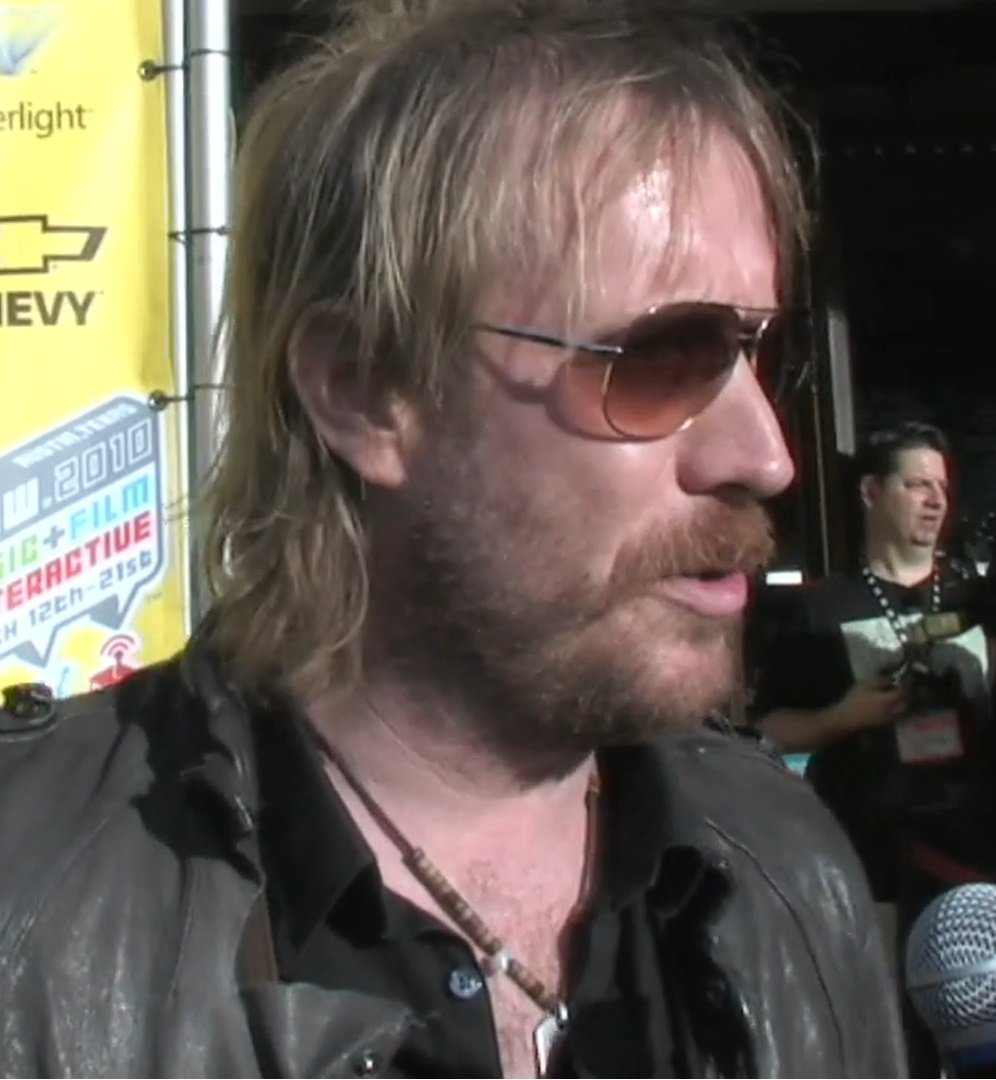
Actors Ioan Gruffudd, Catherine Zeta-Jones and Rhys Ifans became screen icons of Cool Cymru

Although many filmmakers had found success outside Wales, locally based productions often experienced a lack of opportunities and a lack of faith from their Anglo-centric distributors. This became evident in 1994 when despite being critically acclaimed and nominated as a "UK entry" for Best Foreign Language Film at the 66th Academy Awards, Paul Turner's film Hedd Wyn was not given a distribution deal in the UK.

Despite this setback, Hedd Wyn would go on to win global acclaim, winning the Royal Television Society's Award for Best Single Drama in 1992, the Celtic Film Festival's Spirit of the Festival Award in 1993 and First Prize at the Belgium Film Festival in 1994. However, its nomination as a film from the United Kingdom (as opposed to Wales) caused controversy, and was seen as reflecting the film's theme of Welsh struggles against an Imperial Britain. Hedd Wyn marks the start of an unprecedented period for critically acclaimed Welsh that continued throughout the "Cool Cymru" era, and was the first of six consecutive Welsh language films nominated as the British submissions for Best International Feature Film which included Branwen in 1995, Cameleon in 1997, Solomon & Gaenor in 1999, Do Not Go Gentle in 2001 and Eldra in 2002.

The prominence of Welsh actors such as Ioan Gruffudd (who starred in Solomon & Gaenor), Rhys Ifans and Anthony Hopkins (who appeared together in the Chekhov tale August) were all seen as leading figures in the Cool Cymru movement. House of America (about a dysfunctional family in a Welsh mining town) was released in 1997; in that same year Newport-born director Julian Richards released Darklands (the "first home grown Welsh horror film").

The Kevin Allen-produced black comedy Twin Town, which holds cult status in Swansea and internationally, showed Wales' second city in a then-controversial light of "excessive profanity, drug-taking and violence as the order of the day", and provoked the outraged response of Liberal Democrat MP David Alton who railed against the film as "sordid and squalid, plunging new depths of depravity."

In 2024 the chair of BAFTA Cymru, Angharad Mair described "a golden age for Wales-based production in TV and film", pointing to the 2005 revival of Doctor Who as a BBC Cymru Wales production as a lightning rod for further developments and productions. Over the next decade, Wales would produce hit TV shows such as Torchwood, Merlin and Sherlock and see the opening of studios such as Dragon International Film Studios and Roath Lock and production companies such as Bad Wolf. Cardiff's media sector grew rapidly throughout the 21st century, with creative industries accounting for more than 15% of the cities enterprises, and south Wales being home to more television and film studios than anywhere in the UK outside of London.

== Visual arts ==
Welsh artists also found new appreciation during the period. In 1995 Kyffin Williams received the Glyndŵr Award for an Outstanding Contribution to the Arts in Wales during the Machynlleth Festival, and was knighted in 1999. Williams and his work were also a subject for the Manic Street Preachers who quoted Williams on the sleeve of their 2001 single "So Why So Sad". In his first solo album, The Great Western, the band's lead singer James Dean Bradfield would feature artwork inspired by Williams as well as the Williams dedicated track "Which Way to Kyffin."

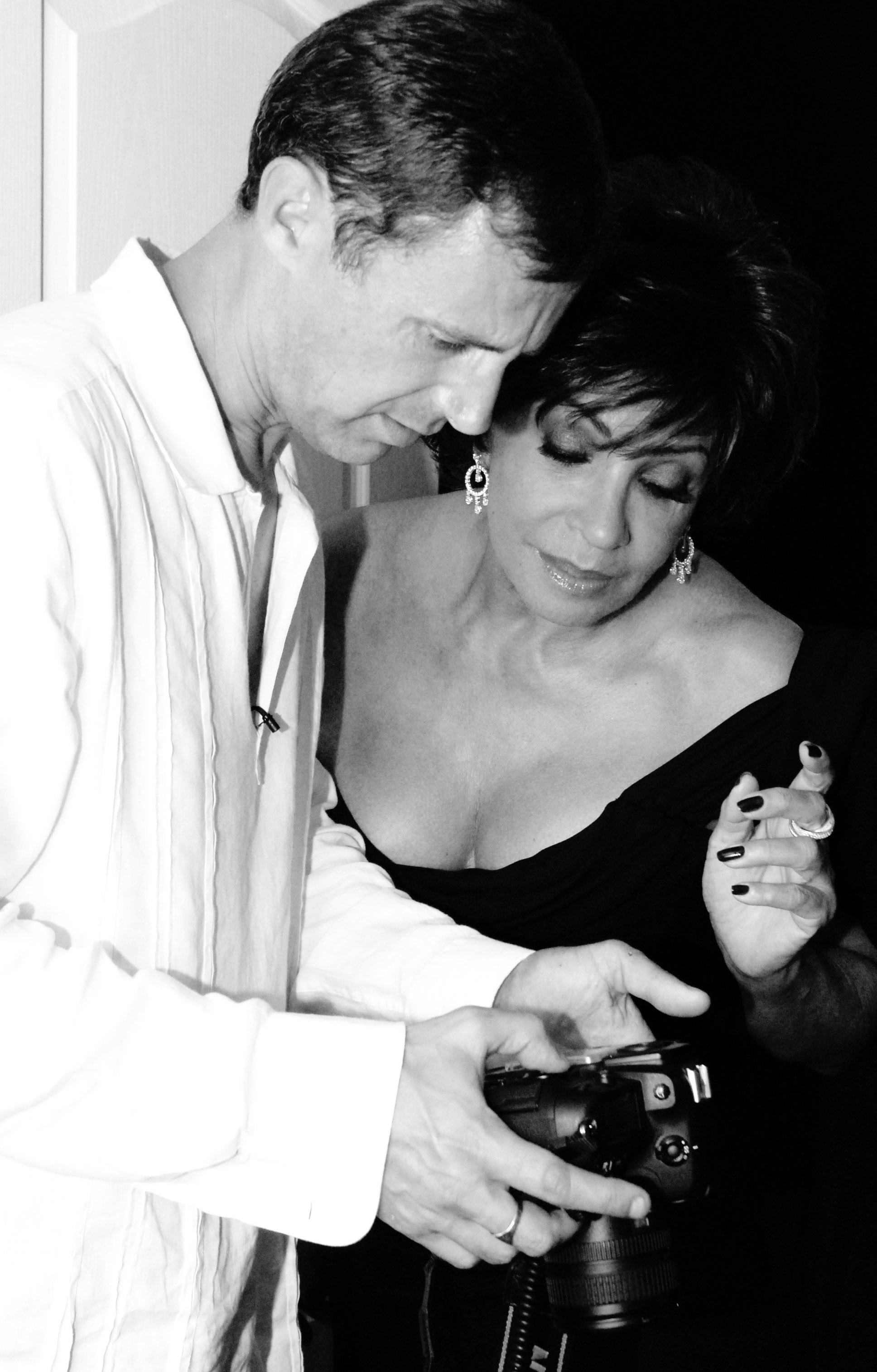
Photographer Terry Morris with one of his subjects Dame Shirley Bassey.

Terry Morris photographic exhibition, Cool Cymru was launched at the Wales Millennium Centre. The exhibition was the first photographic collection at the centre and was opened by one of its subjects, Charlotte Church in 2006. The exhibition would go on to tour other arts venues in Wales and become Morris' first published collection of work, the Cool Cymru Collection. The collection also became the subject of a three-part television documentary produced by the Llanelli-based production company Tinopolis.

== Wider culture ==
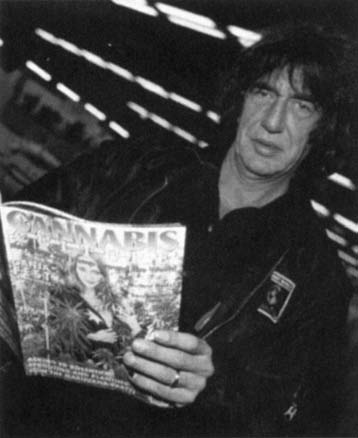
The drug smuggler and author Howard Marks (known as "Mr Nice") became an icon of Cool Cymru, appearing on the cover of the Super Furry Animals album Fuzzy Logic and in films such as Human Traffic

Other events which influenced Welsh popular culture during the era included the Broadcasting Act 1990, which saw a wider remit given to the Welsh language TV channel S4C, commercial sponsorship of the National Eisteddfod of Wales reaching over £1 million for the first time, the establishment of the Newport Riverfront Arts Centre and a number of redevelopment projects in Cardiff that saw the construction of the Millennium Stadium, Wales Millennium Centre and the redevelopment of Cardiff Bay.

Wales in the 1990s was enjoying a particular period of international prominence. Its reputation was heightened by the performances of sporting individuals such as Joe Calzaghe, Ryan Giggs, and Scott Gibbs, as well as the notorious headlines generated by figures like Howard Marks.

"Call Cool Cymru a cliché but our rugby team is riding high, our musicians and actors dominate the charts and the big screen, our language is enjoying a renaissance and our new devolved politics means Wales is taking control of its own destiny."

— Article in the Western Mail newspaper, 1999.

The Guardian in a 2004 review of Cool Cymru described a road map of the scene as a "proud nation of footballer Ryan Giggs, movie star Catherine Zeta-Jones, clothes designer Julien Macdonald, rappers Goldie Lookin Chain and, to a lesser extent, Rhys Ifans and Huw Edwards."

In 2021, Matthew Rhys spoke about his belief that Cool Cymru had a positive impact on the acceptance of the Welsh language, adding that he wished to emulate that affect in his own career.

== Sport ==
=== Athletics ===
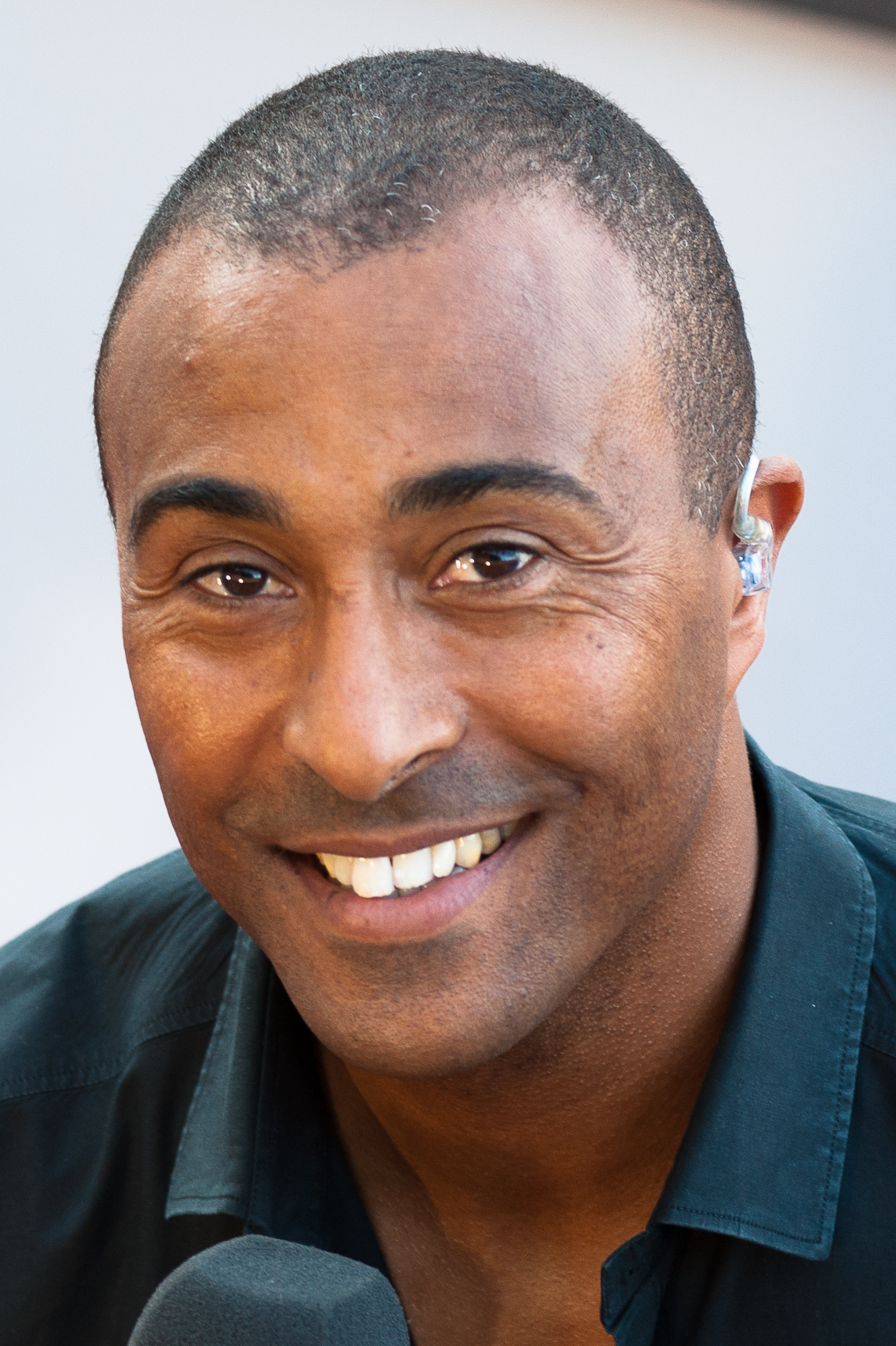
One of Great Britain's most successful athletes, Colin Jackson was also notable for waving the Welsh flag and emphasising his Welsh identity

Throughout the 1990s hurdler Colin Jackson became one of Great Britain's most successful athletes, but was also notable for waving the Welsh flag after every win for Great Britain. Jackson would later acknowledge that he had become more aware of his identity due to Anti-Welsh sentiment during this period, stating "I felt the discrimination was because I was Welsh more than anything else."

Jackson's success and pride in being Welsh saw him receiving substantial recognition in Wales, and he became an early icon of Cool Cymru, Jackson has won BBC Wales Sports Personality of the Year three times and was invited to present the Best British Group Award to fellow Welshmen, The Manic Street Preachers at the 1997 Brit Awards.

=== Rugby Union ===
Rugby union in Wales is often viewed as a "cultural signifier", with the National team's fortunes often seen as mirroring the economic and cultural state of the nation.

Wales were arguably at their lowest ebb in 1998, when they suffered their biggest ever loss in a test match against South Africa. As such Wales appointed a new Head Coach in Graham Henry. Henry would lead Wales to a dramatic turn-around, winning a record ten straight victories within his first year as Head Coach including a first win in Paris for 24 years, a first ever win over South Africa and a close victory over England at Wembley. Henry became "a national icon" appearing on chatshows and in a BBC Wales cartoon before being dubbed "The great Redeemer" (an allusion to the traditional Welsh verse "Guide me O thou great Redeemer").

==== England at Wembley ====
The last round of the 1999 Five Nations Championship saw a much fancied England play an away fixture against Wales at the end of their temporary residence of Wembley Stadium in London (the home of English soccer). BBC Wales had trailed their coverage of the match with a song written and performed by Kelly Jones entitled "As long as We Beat The English." The song detailed Wales' recent losses and suggested that the losses would be forgotten with victory over England, and was viewed by some commentators in England and Wales as antagonistic or jingoistic. However, the song also received praise as showing the pride Wales was now displaying in the BBC's "year of Cool Cymru". The build-up to the match also featured Tom Jones, Max Boyce and traditional Welsh choirs.

England were aiming to complete a Grand Slam and, despite looking by far the better team for much of the game, only led Wales by 6 points with 3 minutes left. The England captain Lawrence Dallaglio was confident enough to turn down the chance of another three points (which would have seen Wales needing to score twice in the last minutes), opting for a lineout and the chance to win the match with a try instead. However Colin Charvis won a penalty and gave Wales one final chance to score. With their last attacking play, Scott Quinnell nearly fumbled the ball before passed it to Scott Gibbs who (despite earning the nickname "Car Crash" for his direct style) scored one of the most celebrated tries in Welsh rugby history by side-stepping his way to the try line from 20 meters out.

Man of the match Neil Jenkins kicked the conversion to win the match by a single point. Gibbs's try has since become one of the most celebrated in Welsh history, being replayed at many events such as that year's Stereophonics concert at Morfa, Swansea.

According to Rhian E. Jones, writing for the Institute of Welsh Affairs, "Wales's Five Nations victory against England – the event seeming to herald a return to not only erstwhile rugby glory-days but also the pop-cultural success of 70s Welsh artists, particularly given the phenomenal success of (Tom) Jones's retro-kitsch album Reload which also featured Cerys Matthews, James Dean Bradfield and the Stereophonics."

==== World Cup and Millennium Stadium ====
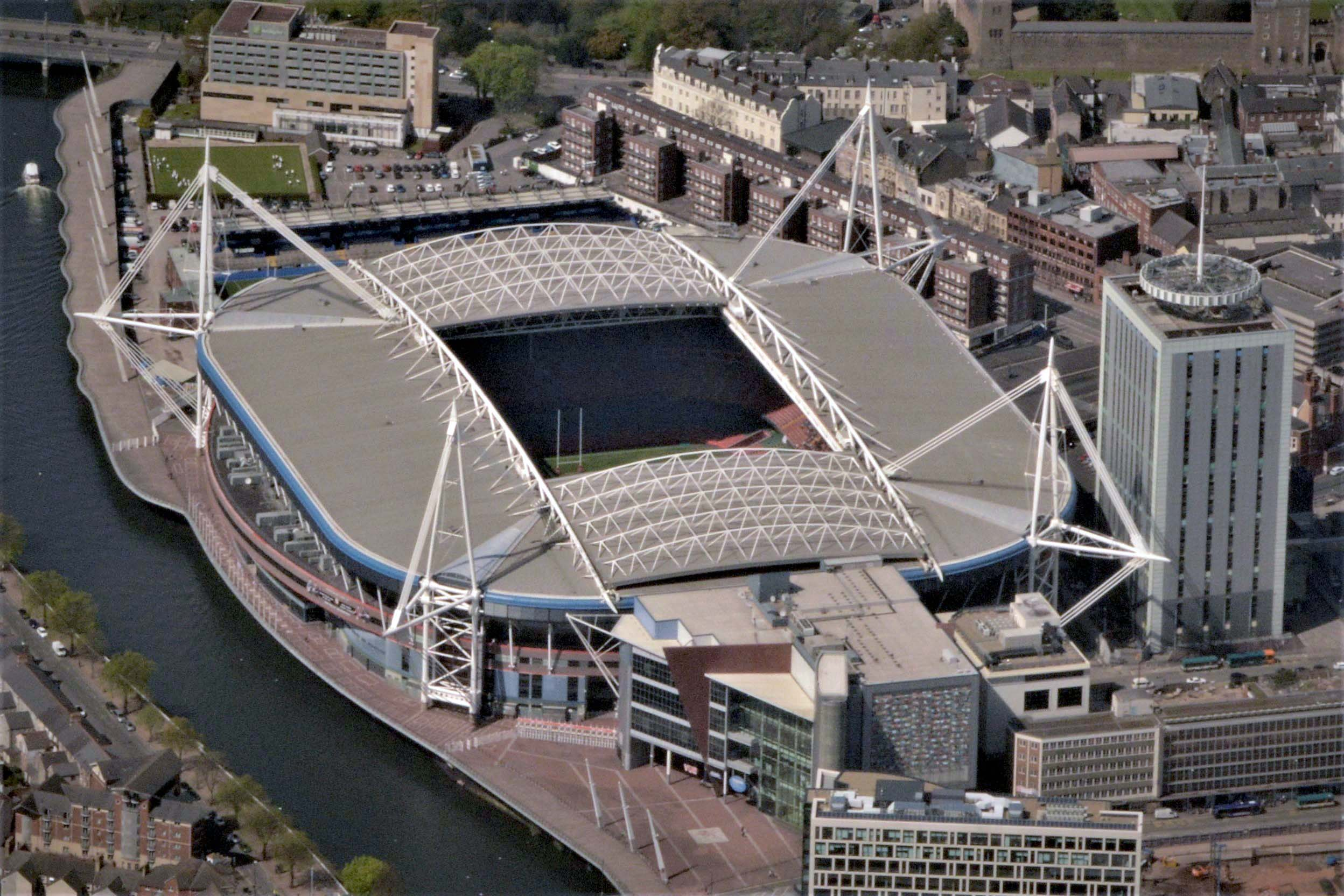
The Millennium Stadium was constructed for the 1999 Rugby World Cup hosted by Wales.

With rugby becoming a professional sport in 1995 and Wales winning the bid to host the 1999 World Cup, the Welsh Rugby Union was able to finance redevelopment of the old National Stadium. The project was costed at £121 million and was partially funded by £46 million from the Millennium Commission, as such the new development was named the Millennium Stadium.

The project was completed by June 1999 in time to host the opening ceremony of the World Cup and seven matches including the World Cup Final. The development also foreshadowed more redevelopment in Cardiff and Cardiff Bay. The development was a major part of Cardiff's urban renewal. The stadium has contributed between £100m-£135m to the city's economy every year since its construction.

=== Boxing ===
In the 90's, Joe Calzaghe was considered a part of Cool Cymru due to his ongoing success in boxing.

== Revival ==
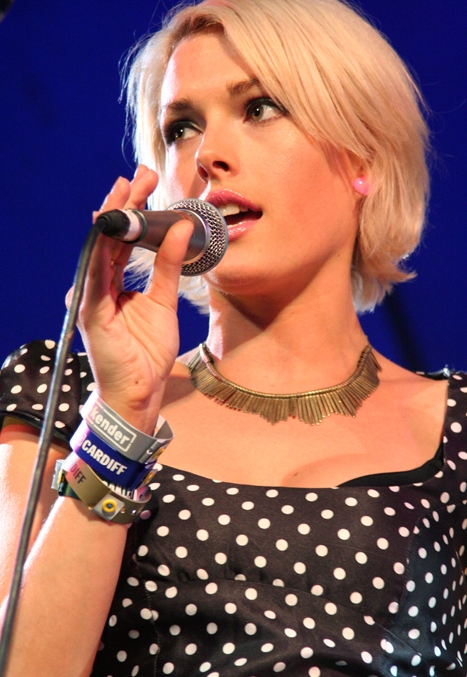
The artist Gwenno is seen as a leading figure in Cool Cymru 2.0

The 2010s saw a renewed growth in independent music in Wales, with the launch of Welsh Language Music Day and Horizons Gorwelion (initiatives backed by the Welsh Government) and new festivals such as Sŵn and Tafwyl. This led to comparisons to the Cool Cymru era and discussions on whether modern Welsh music and wider culture was experiencing similar developments, with media figures labeling the new movement "Cool Cymru 2.0"

Cool Cymru 2.0 would be somewhat stalled by the COVID-19 pandemic, but would reemerge in the mid-2020s led by artists such as Gwenno, Sage Todz, Adwaith, Lemfreck and Panic Shack. The new movement is viewed as more "grass-roots" than its predecessor, with more Welsh language releases and a more modern understanding of Welsh identity.

== See also ==
- Cool Britannia
- Culture of Wales
- Britpop
- Post-Britpop
- Welsh pop and rock music
