= Terry Morris (artist and photographer) =

Photographer

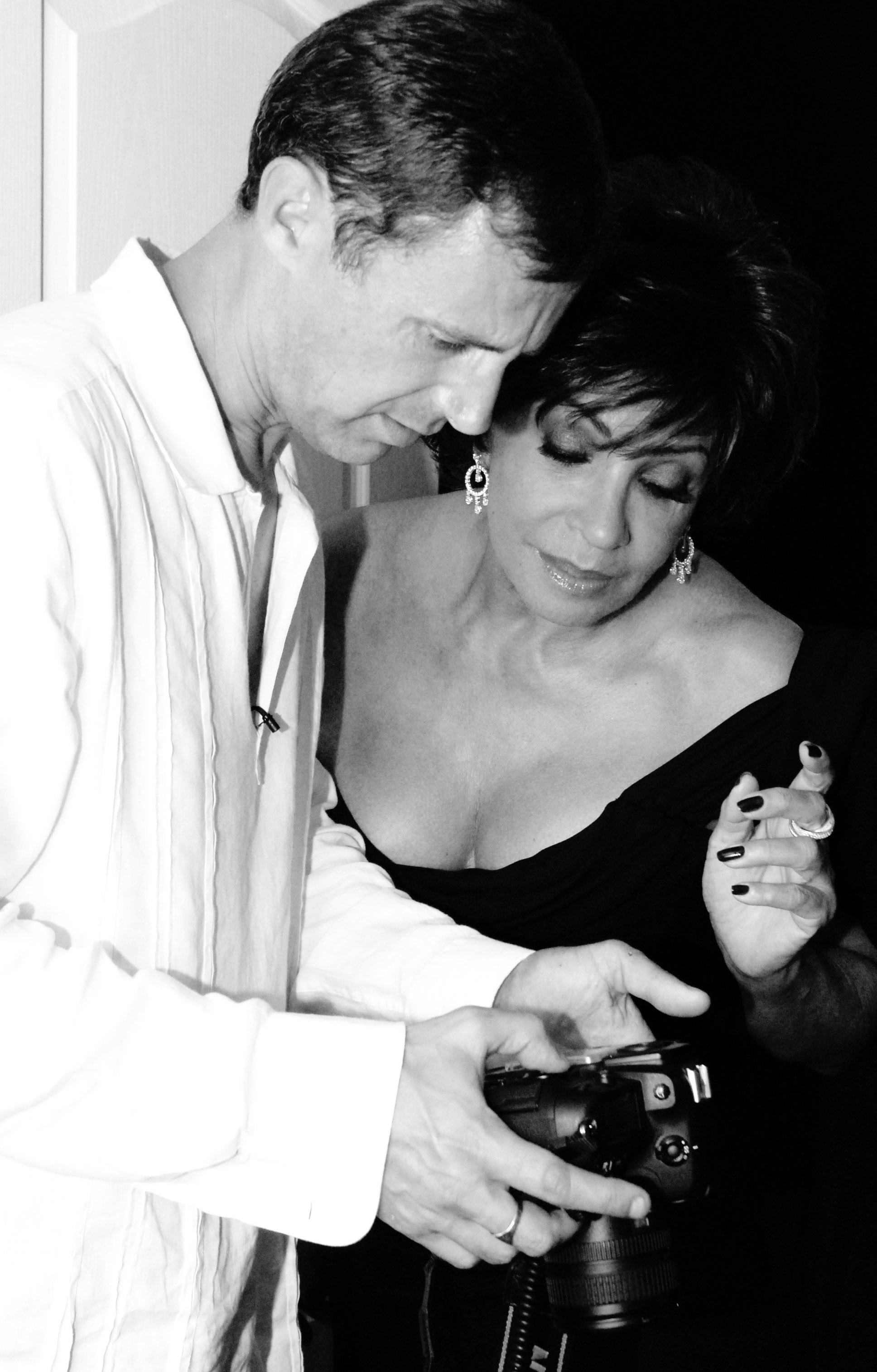
- Terry Morris and Dame Shirley Bassey
- Born: 6 September 1965 (age 60)
- Occupations: Photographer & artist

Terry Morris (born 6 September 1965 in Llanelli) is a Welsh artist who is primarily known for his photography, particularly his association with the Cool Cymru arts movement.

== Early life ==
Terry Morris was born in Llanelli in September 1965. He attended Lakefield Infant and Primary School before moving on to Graig Comprehensive School, Llanelli. Self-confessed as 'not the best academic', Terry lost interest in school during his teens and only stayed on his final year, aged 15, to study woodwork with his favourite teacher 'Mr Evans' (Mike Evans), lovingly known as 'Killer' (due to his Size 13 plimsole!)

Terry left school at 16 and joined the Parachute Regiment in which he served for one year.

During the following years he worked in many different jobs, including as a labourer for his father's building firm, before settling as a welder for Llanelli-based sound and lighting firm PA Installations.

== Early career ==
In his 30s Terry went back to college (Gorseinon College) to study Black and White Documentary Photography before starting on the freelance circuit working weekends for the local newspapers (Llanelli Star and Evening Post).

Still employed by PA Installations, Terry was offered a week’s work with the Star when the staff photographer took a week's annual leave. Seeing it as his chance, Terry took a week's sick leave from his employer to cut his teeth as a 'proper' freelance photographer – only to be caught red-handed by his boss halfway through the week and sacked on the spot!

He then went on to work regularly for local and regional media titles before starting to hit the front pages of national tabloids and broadsheets.

Press photography started to lose its appeal in the early 2000s when Terry's ambitions started to grow. A chance to photograph former Stereophonics drummer Stuart Cable, who was in town having his latest tattoo, led to him taking his first steps towards achieving his ambition of becoming the first portrait photographer to capture a photographic Welsh Hall of Fame – later to become known as the Cool Cymru Collection

== Cool Cymru ==
In 2006 his first published collection, entitled Cool Cymru was exhibited at the Wales Millennium Centre, becoming the first photographic collection to hang on its walls. Opened at the launch by one of the collection's featured stars, Charlotte Church, all 12 prints in the original collection were auctioned, raising over £20,000 for The Noah's Ark Appeal, the fundraising arm of the Children's Hospital of Wales. It went on to tour other Welsh venues.

Launched alongside the photographic collection, the book Cool Cymru Collection . included his portraiture and documented his struggles to finance his dream project and make it a reality. There was also a three-part television documentary filmed by Llanelli-based production company Tinopolis.

Those pictured in the collection were:

- Shirley Bassey
- Tom Jones
- Katherine Jenkins
- Rhys Ifans
- Charlotte Church
- Gavin Henson
- Kelly Jones
- Joe Calzaghe
- Bryn Terfel
- Ioan Gruffudd
- Ryan Giggs
- Stuart Cable

Latest additions to the collection include Welsh rugby hero Shane Williams, the world's richest living painter Andrew Vicari, Wales First Minister Rhodri Morgan and Welsh actor Matthew Rhys.

== Stradey Park ==
In 2008, Morris's second photo-based book was published. Faces of Stradey Park documented the final season of a Welsh rugby ground which was home to Llanelli RFC and professional region the Llanelli Scarlets for 129 years until October 2008. Morris and writer Andy Pearson were granted access to the ground throughout the 2007–08 rugby season to gather material for the book. It featured the stadium's November 2007 funeral service for rugby player and broadcaster Ray Gravell.

== Artist's Jubilee Gift to Queen ==
Terry Morris, Carmarthenshire’s Ambassador for the Arts, presented the Queen with a unique Diamond Jubilee tribute, his own portrait of Her Majesty.

Morris had been working on the Royal portrait for a year and it forms part of a pair. Morris says: “As this is a very special year, I wanted to make a special gesture. She said that she was touched, and that the painting had given her much pleasure.” He comments: “Over the years I have photographed and painted a great number of famous faces, but Her Majesty is in quite a different league. Her image is on coins, banknotes, stamps and in the media worldwide. It was a real challenge to try and capture her in a unique way. I have spent twelve months trying to get it right. I hope I have succeeded – I have tried to capture both the iconic and the human sides of Her Majesty.”

This is not the first time that Morris has pictured the Queen. During the Millennium celebrations in 2000 he was asked to take a photographic portrait during a Royal visit to South Wales. He recalls: “Unfortunately she was on a very tight schedule so I had to work very quickly. After the session I felt that I hadn’t done Her Majesty justice. That planted the seed of the idea to paint this portrait. I wanted to get it right.”

In his role as Ambassador for the Arts in Carmarthenshire, Morris works with children and young people, encouraging them to think creatively and express themselves. He says: “I hope I can show the next generation that the arts are not only fun and rewarding, but offer a range of great opportunities for careers. The creative industries are a big part of Wales’ future and we need to harness all that emerging talent we have. Perhaps when the Queen celebrates her Platinum Jubilee one of these youngsters will be presenting her with another portrait.”

== Publications ==
- Cool Cymru Collection, Morris, Terry; Pearson, Andy: Graffeg 2006 ISBN 9781905582099
- Faces of Stradey Park, Morris, Terry; Pearson, Andy: Bryngold Books 2008 ISBN 9781905900091
