= Adwaith =

Welsh-language indie rock group

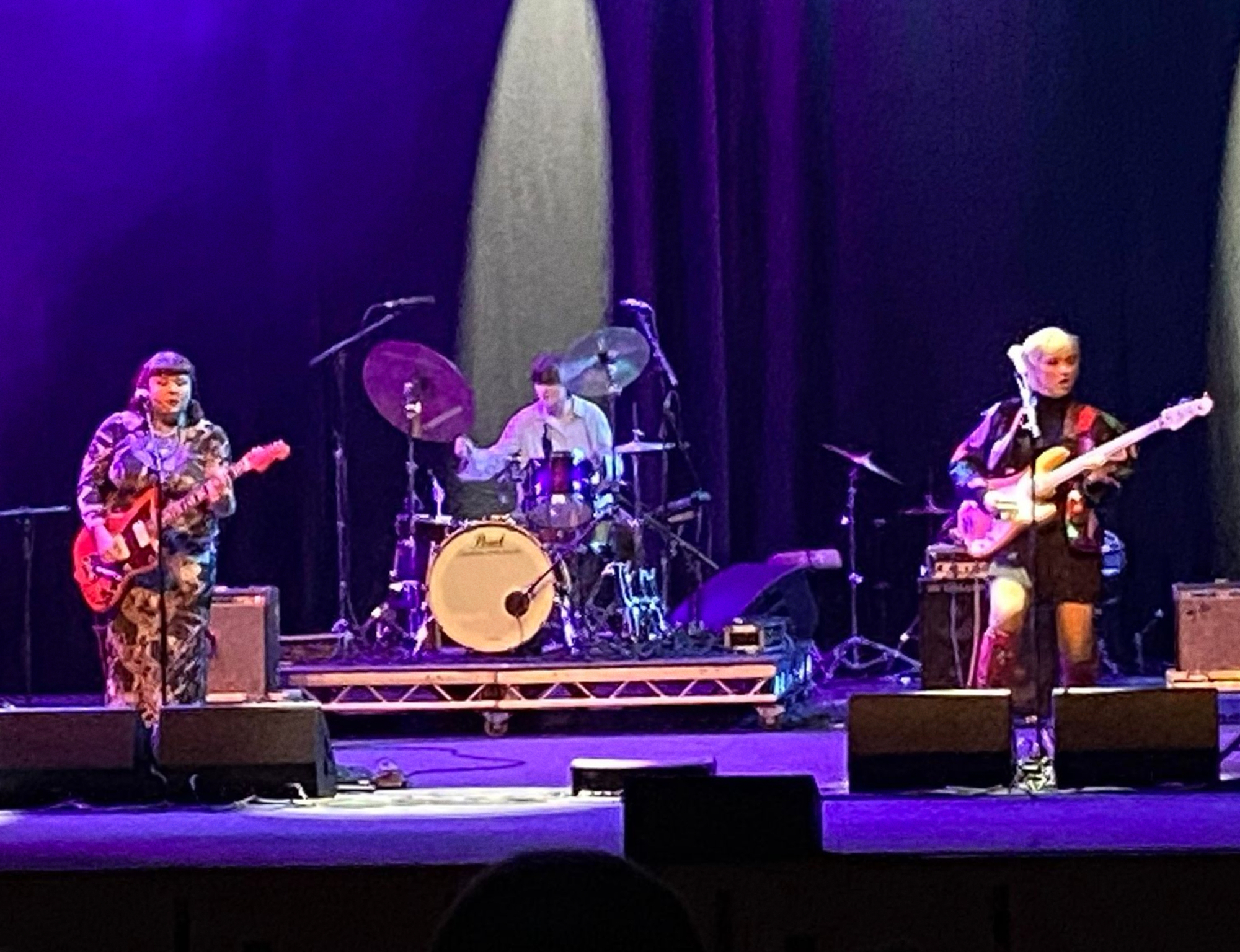
- Adwaith performing at the Welsh Music Prize ceremony in Cardiff, 2022

Background information
- Origin: Carmarthen, Wales
- Genres: Indie rock
- Years active: 2015–present
- Labels: Libertino Records
- Members: Hollie Singer; Gwenllian Anthony; Heledd Owen
- Website: adwaithmusic

Adwaith (transl. 'Reaction') are a Welsh language indie rock group from Carmarthen in West Wales, formed in 2015. The group consists of Hollie Singer (vocals, guitar), Gwenllian Anthony (bass, keys, mandolin) and Heledd Owen (drums). Signed to Libertino Records, they released their first album Melyn in 2018. Both Melyn and its follow-up Bato Mato (2022) won Welsh Music Prize awarded for the best album from Wales, making Adwaith the first act to receive the award twice. A third album, Solas, was released in February 2025. They are currently on a performing break.

== History ==
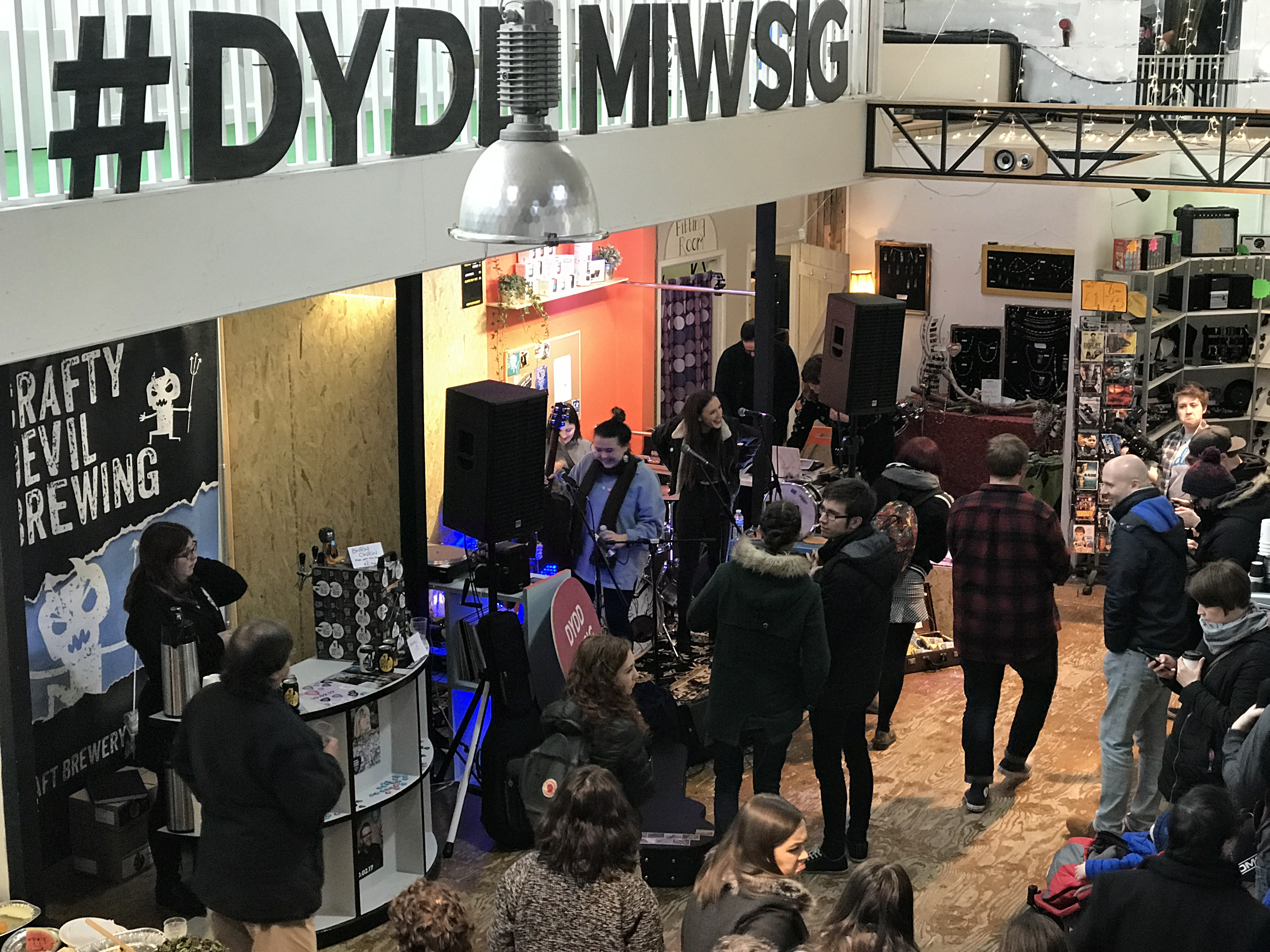
Adwaith performing at Welsh Language Music Day 2017

Band members Hollie Singer and Gwenllian Anthony grew up together in Carmarthen and have known each other since the age of three. After forming a band and performing in the town, they remained without a drummer, and met current drummer Heledd Owen at their first performance. The band were taken on by head of Libertino Records, Gruff Wyn Owen. Singer and Owen study music at universities in south Wales and London respectively, while Anthony works at Carmarthen venue the Parrot. "Adwaith" means reaction in Welsh. In an interview, Singer said, "One of our mothers asked what reaction was in Welsh, and we just thought 'Oh, that would make a cool band name!'"

Adwaith first appeared on the Welsh language music scene to a wide audience at Welsh Language Music Day 2017, where the group performed at Womanby Street's Castle Emporium, releasing new music and joining a number of other up and coming Welsh artists as part of the organisation's promotional campaign. As part of the day, Wales Online author David Owens names the band in his "75 songs to celebrate Welsh Language Music Day" list.

In July 2017, the group were named in the lineup for the 2017 Festival N°6 in Portmeirion. The "post-rock girl group" were billed as part of the BBC Wales and Arts Council Wales’ music project Horizons Gorwelion which each year promotes 12 selected contemporary independent musicians in Wales. The group also appeared on the BBC Music Introducing stage at Latitude Festival in 2017.

The group were again listed in September 2017, this time for Swn Festival in Cardiff. The band played the event's Discovery Day at an event which included names such as Courtney Barnett and Boy Azooga. David Owens of Wales Online again praised the band with inclusion in his "The 57 greatest songs from Wales in 2017" list.

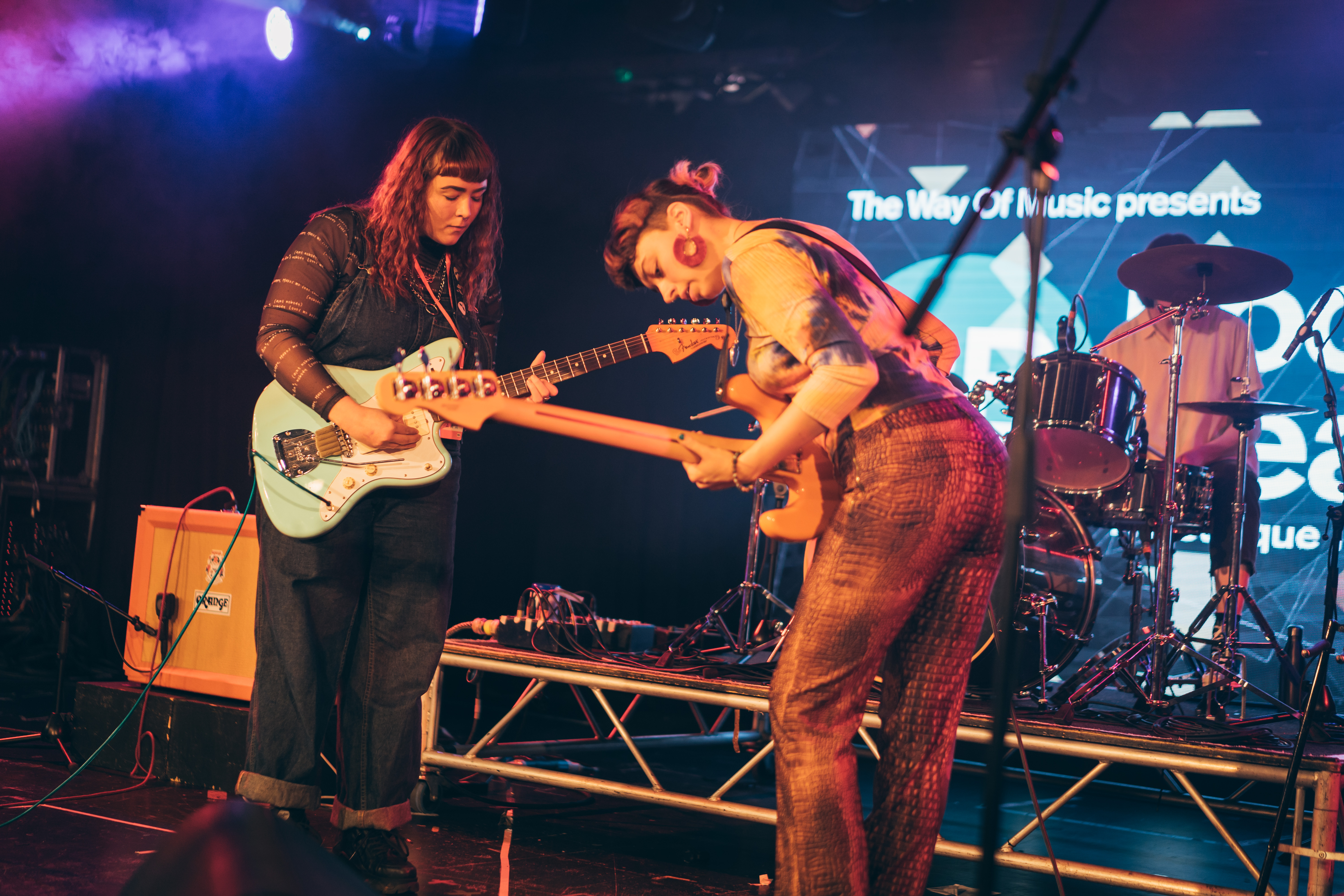
Adwaith playing in Rockaway 2020

In December 2017 the band were announced as recipients of BBC Cymru Wales and Wales Art Council funding under the Horizons Gorwelion scheme, receiving part of the £35,000 fund shared among contemporary independent Welsh musicians. That same month, the group launched their debut music video, "FEMME", which combined a "jangly C86 indie pop sound" with the "cheeky and bold [video] with an important message". The band were named as part of the 12 name shortlist for the 2018 edition of Horizons Gorwelion.

In 2018 the group performed at Welsh music showcase FOCUS Wales, held at Wrexham's Tŷ Pawb venue, performing a "stripped-back" set including a cover of a song by Childish Gambino. The event has been described as Wales' biggest music industry event led by talks and advice from industry figures. The group also supported Gwenno at Islington Assembly Hall.

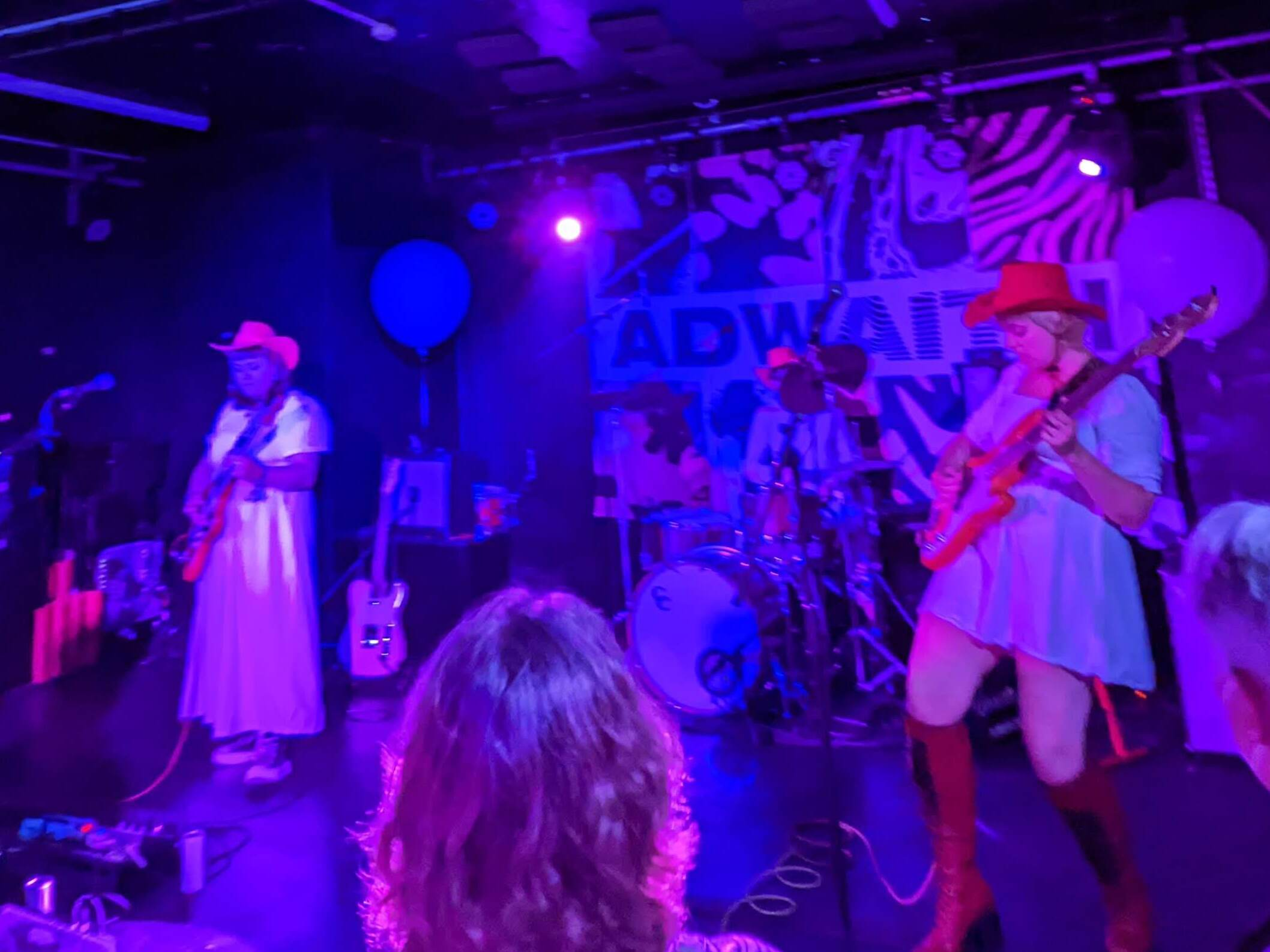
Adwaith performing at Clwb Ifor Bach in Cardiff, 2022

The band also featured on the Green Man Rising Stage in the Brecon Beacons for Green Man Festival 2018, and launched their single "Gartref" at Cardiff's Clwb Ifor Bach. The band describe the single (written while travelling home from Italy) as relating to "a longing and not having a home, and not having a safe space".

The band have performed at Wales Goes Pop and Future is Female festival, and started their own FEMME nights intended to offer a safe space to women. Performers at FEMME have included Ani Glass, Chroma, Serol Serol, Gwenno and Patricia Morgan from Datblygu.

The band's single "Fel i Fod" was used by the Football Association of Wales women's team in the build-up to their fixtures.

Adwaith released their debut album, Melyn,(transl. Yellow) in October 2018, It was recorded at Giant Wafer Studios in Powys and at Music Box in Cardiff, and produced by Estrons bass player Steff Pringle. The album's visually striking sleeve was designed by H. Hawkline. The band's single, Gartref, was remixed in 2018 by Manic Street Preachers member James Bradfield, and their defiant post-punk track "Y Diweddaraf" was named Clash Magazine's Track of the Day for the 1st of October. The band were featured in The Guardian for a piece on the growth of Welsh language pop culture.

One week after releasing their album, the band performed their work at Sŵn Festival at Clwb Ifor Bach in Cardiff.

The band again participated in Welsh Language Music Day in February 2019 and in June at the Tafwyl festival at Cardiff Castle, a three-day "celebration of Welsh music".

In April 2019 the band appeared at Diverse Records' special event in Newport for Record Store Day 2019, performing at McCann's Rock and Ale Bar in the city. In July they launched a new double A-side with the title track, "Hey!". The band's tracks were further promoted when Gizmodo reported on the Cân y Cymry playlist on Spotify, where the band were named in the top 5. Huw Stephens covered the band in his Cymru Rising programme for BBC Radio 4. In July the band performed at Cardigan Castle, and announced an October tour of independent UK venues including Poetry Club (Glasgow), Yes (Manchester), and The Victoria (Dalston, London), alongside Mellt and Papur Wal. The band will perform in January 2020 at Rockaway Beach festival, alongside The Jesus and Mary Chain and Fontaines DC, in Bognor Regis.

In November 2019, the band were announced as winners of the Welsh Music Prize for Melyn.

In June 2022, Adwaith performed at the historic Glastonbury Festival on the BBC introducing stage. They released their second album, Bato Mato, in July 2022. The album won them the Welsh Music Prize in October 2022, making them the first act to receive the award twice.

Adwaith's third album, titled Solas, was released in February 2025. The album was recorded in West Wales, Lisbon and the Outer Hebrides. It includes 23 songs making it a double album. The album was released on the 10th anniversary of Welsh Language Music Day. It was also announced that Adwaith had won two Sound of Miwsig awards, namely the best song of the decade (Eto) in addition to the most influential Welsh language band of the last decade. To coincide with the realising of the album Adwaith participated in a UK and European tour.

In September 2025 the band announced that it would have a performing break to 'take a little time to write, to reinvent and to figure out which direction we want to go in'.

== Politics ==
Adwaith are supporters of Welsh independence. They told Yes is More: "Britain are relying on Westminster and England too much, people from Scotland and Wales are quickly starting to realise that independence is a great option. We need a leader who puts Wales first and has a genuine care for the culture and language."

== Band members ==
- Hollie Singer - vocals, guitar (2015–present)
- Gwenllian Anthony - bass, keys, mandolin (2015–present)
- Heledd Owen - drums (2015–present)

=== Supporting ===
- Gillie Rowland - guitar (2023)
- Rhys Grail - guitar (2023–present)

== Discography ==
=== Singles ===
Year	Title	Label	Album
2018	"Fel i Fod / Newid"	Libertino Records	Melyn
2018	"Pwysau"	Libertino Records	Melyn
2018	"Haul"	Libertino Records	
2018	"Femme / Lipstick Coch"	Libertino Records	Melyn
2018	"Gartref / James Dean Bradfield Remix"	Libertino Records	Melyn
2018	"Y Diweddaraf"	Libertino Records	Melyn
2019	"O Dan Y Haenau"	Libertino Records	Melyn
2019	"Wine Time"/"Hey!"	Libertino Records	
2020	"Orange Sofa"/ "Byd Ffug"	Libertino Records	
2020	"Lan Y Môr"	Libertino Records	
2022	"Eto"	Libertino Records	Bato Mato
2022	"Wedi Blino"	Libertino Records	Bato Mato
2023	"Addo"	Libertino Records	Solas
2024	''MWY''	Libertino Records	Solas
2024	''Miliwn''	Libertino Records	Solas

=== Albums ===
Year	Title	Label
2018	Melyn	Libertino Records
2022	Bato Mato	Libertino Records
2025	Solas	Libertino Records
