= X Music Festival =

- Genre: Dance / Electronic / Hip Hop / Rap
- Dates: June 3rd & 4th 2016
- Locations: Cardiff, Bute Park
- Years active: 2015-2016
- Capacity: 32,000
- Website: www.xmusicfestival.com

X Music Festival is a dance music festival held each June on the former grounds of Cardiff Castle in Wales.
