= Bethan Elfyn =

British radio and television presenter

- Born: Bethan Elfyn; Bangor, Wales
- Spouse: Richard Hawkins
- Children: 2
- Presenting career
- Show: Bethan Elfyn
- Station: BBC Radio Wales
- Time slot: 19:00–22:00 Saturday
- Style: Classic rock and new Welsh music
- Country: Wales and United Kingdom

Bethan Elfyn (Welsh pronunciation: [ˈbɛθan ˈɛlvɨn]) is a Welsh radio and television presenter.

Elfyn was born in Bangor, Gwynedd, was brought up in Newtown, Powys, and now lives in Penarth, Glamorgan with her husband, Richard Hawkins, who is promoter and word manager at Clwb Ifor Bach. They have two children.

== Career ==
Elfyn is a fluent Welsh speaker and has appeared as a panellist on Welsh-language channel S4C's music talent show Wawffactor. She co-hosted Radio 1's first Welsh-language programme as part of the oneclick strand in August 2005 with Aled Haydn-Jones from The Chris Moyles Show.

Elfyn co-presented the Wales programme on BBC Radio 1 with Huw Stephens as part of the station's regional output every Thursday evening. She joined Radio 1 in 1999 during the Cool Cymru era of music and arts popularity, as part of the aforementioned new regional output, and left in 2010 after 11 years at the station.

She currently presents the Saturday evening show for BBC Radio Wales on the current Welsh music scene, with live sessions, interviews and a mix of classic rock and pop. Elfyn also presents The Bethan Elfyn Show on Amazing Radio where she plays a music from new and emerging artists. She also appears occasionally on BBC 6 Music as cover for presenters including Lauren Laverne.

Elfyn is also one of the architects of the BBC/Wales Arts Council programme Horizons Gorwelion, supporting new Welsh bands. The programme was established in 2014.
