= Sŵn =

Music festival in Cardiff, Wales

Sŵn festival Welsh: Gŵyl Sŵn
- Genre: Alternative rock, punk rock, indie rock
- Dates: Early-Mid October/November
- Frequency: Annually
- Venue: 2025 venues: Clwb Ifor Bach; Tramshed; Fuel; The New Moon; Boho Club; Jacobs Basement; The Canopi; Porters; St John the Baptist Church
- Location: Cardiff
- Country: Wales
- Years active: 2007–present
- Founders: Huw Stephens and John Rostron
- Most recent: 16–18 October 2025
- Website: www.swnfest.com

Sŵn Festival (sŵn is Welsh for "sound, noise", Welsh pronunciation: [suːn]) is a music festival founded by BBC Radio 6 Music DJ Huw Stephens and Cardiff-based promoter John Rostron. The festival takes place annually in Stephens' hometown of Cardiff, Wales. The first Sŵn Festival took place in November 2007. Bands playing included The Cribs, Beirut, David Holmes, Edwyn Collins and Cherry Ghost with DJs including Annie Mac.

Music is the festival's core medium. Stephens' eclectic musical taste is reflected in the diversity of the artists performing, and Welsh language bands are well represented on the line-up.

The 2008 festival took place on 14–16 November 2008. Bands playing included Golden Silvers, Truckers of Husk, Micachu and the Shapes, Little Comets, Young Marble Giants, Euros Childs, Colorama, Sweet Baboo and Rob Da Bank.

The 2009 festival took place on 22–24 October 2009. Dananananaykroyd, Johnny Foreigner, Copy Haho, Munch Munch, the Drums, Longcut, Girls, Gaggle, the Twilight Sad, Cate Le Bon, Talons, Sweet Baboo, and Cardiff-based band Los Campesinos! played. Venues used in 2009 were Chapter Arts Centre, Barfly, City Arms, Clwb Ifor Bach, Dempseys, Y Fuwch Goch, The Model Inn, The Toucan, Cardiff University Students Union, The Gate and The Vulcan.

Sŵn festival 2013 took place in October in Cardiff City Centre with new venues added including the Sherman Theatre & the Angel Hotel. This edition of the event won the "Best Small Festival" accolade at the NME awards in 2014. The 2015 edition of Sŵn Festival was also nominated for "Best Small Festival" at the NME Awards.

In 2018 it was announced that Clwb Ifor Bach would take over the running of the festival as Stephens and Rostron departed.

Sŵn 2024 took place from Thursday 17 October to Saturday 19 October in partnership with the three-week Cardiff City Music Festival. Venues included Fuel bar, Tiny Rebel, Cornerstone, Clwb Ifor Bach, Jacob's Basement and Tramshed. Highlights included Adwaith, Antony Szmierek, Lambrini Girls and a packed-out set by the recent Mercury Music Prize-winning English Teacher at Tramshed on Saturday night.
