= Huw Stephens =

Welsh radio and television presenter

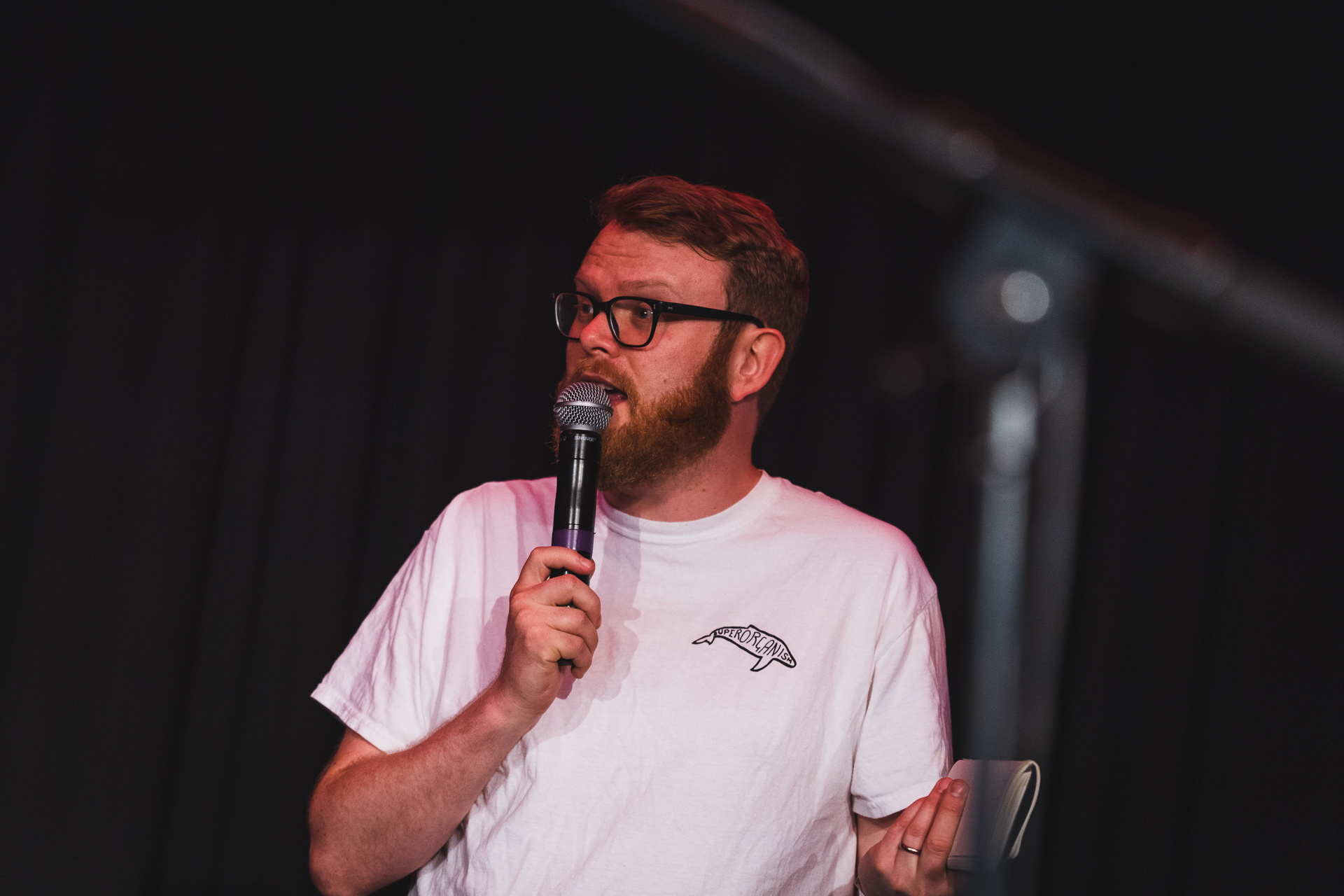
- Born: Huw Meredydd Stephens; 25 May 1981 (age 45); Cardiff, Wales
- Years active: 1999–present
- Spouse: Sara Davies (m. 2012)
- Presenting career
- Show: Huw Stephens
- Stations: BBC Radio Wales and BBC Radio 6 Music
- Time slot: 19:00–22:00 Monday (Radio Wales) and 16:00–19:00 Tuesday–Friday (Radio 6 Music)
- Show: Huw Stephens
- Stations: BBC Radio Cymru and BBC Radio Cymru 2
- Time slot: 05:30–07:00 Saturday
- Style: New music
- Country: United Kingdom (Wales)

Huw Meredydd Stephens (born 25 May 1981) is a Welsh radio and television presenter, currently broadcasting on BBC Radio Wales, BBC Radio Cymru and BBC Radio 6 Music. He previously presented late-night and specialist shows on BBC Radio 1.

Stephens founded the Sŵn music festival with John Rostron and the yearly showcase Welsh Language Music Day.

Stephens produced the 2018 documentary film Anorac about the Welsh language music scene. He presented the Cofiwch Dryweryn documentary for S4C, following the history of the graffiti that his father painted in 1963, and The Story of Welsh Art, a 3-part documentary series for the BBC. He also presented Cymru Rising on BBC Radio 4, documenting the Welsh language music scene.

== Career ==
Stephens joined BBC Radio 1 in 1999 at the age of 17 as part of the station's new regional output, where he hosted the Wales opt-out with Bethan Elfyn and became the youngest ever Radio 1 presenter. Before this he was a DJ on Rookwood Sound hospital radio in Llandaff, Cardiff. In 2015 he became a joint patron of Rookwood Sound.

In 2005, Stephens gained a UK-wide slot when he became one of the replacements for the late John Peel as part of Radio 1's One Music strand, which was intended to keep the spirit of Peel's show going with DJs Rob da Bank and Ras Kwame. He went on to present the weekend afternoon show and a two-hour new music programme on Thursday evenings, as well as being regular daytime cover. Stephens presented the 22:00–01:00 show, Monday to Wednesday, from 2014 to 2018, when he presented on Sunday evenings, concentrating on new music championed by BBC Music Introducing until 2020. Whilst at Radio 1, he presented regularly on BBC Radio 6 Music, often deputising for Steve Lamacq, Lauren Laverne, Mary Anne Hobbs, Marc Riley and Gideon Coe.

Stephens is a fluent Welsh speaker and has long presented an evening show on BBC Radio Cymru, formerly part of the C2 music strand; originally on a Monday evening slot, his show ran on Thursday evenings under the name Byd Huw Stephens until April 2026, when he moved to Saturday early mornings from 5:30am to 7:00am. Stephens also presented Bandit, a television show on Welsh-language channel S4C which showcased Welsh language music talent, until it was taken off air in December 2011. He founded the "Boobytrap Singles Club", which released limited singles by Mclusky, The Keys and Zabrinski amongst others. Stephens is one of the founders of Welsh language label Am, whose releases include Mr Huw, Radio Luxembourg and Threatmantics. In 2009 he released a compilation called "Music Sounds Better With Huw Volume 1" via Wichita Recordings on iTunes. It featured 21 up and coming artists including Gold Panda, Dinosaur Pile-Up, Banjo or Freakout and Young Fathers.

Stephens is a curator of the BBC Music Introducing Stage, which showcases new unsigned and emerging music at the Reading and Leeds, Glastonbury, Radio One's Big Weekend and T in the Park festivals. He has also invited bands and artists to play at Sonar, Groningen and the SXSW music festivals. Since its inception in 2006 he has curated the Lake Stage at the Latitude Festival in Suffolk, inviting The 1975, Cate le Bon, The xx, Sam Smith, Catfish and the Bottlemen amongst others to play. Stephens has been the opening presenter on the Mountain Stage at the Green Man Festival, and DJ's there regularly onstage and on Green Man Radio.

In 2005 Stephens became the compere and DJ for the main stage of Reading Festival. He hosted the NME Awards from 2014 until 2018 and has DJed at Green Man, Sonar, Camp Bestival, Bestival, Big Chill, Field Day and the National Eisteddfod of Wales, where he also presented the Gig y Pafiliwn with the Welsh Pops Orchestra. He has contributed to the Western Mail, Kruger Magazine, The Independent, The Mirror and NME, and guest-edited the Guardian music blog. He was the voice of the Discovery Shed television channel.

In 2007, he established a new music festival for Cardiff. The first Sŵn festival took place on 9–11 November across 13 venues in the city and has occurred yearly since (with the exception of 2020). Sŵn (pronounced "soon") is the Welsh word for "sound", and the festival brings new bands, DJs and performers from Wales, the UK and elsewhere together with art and films in Cardiff city centre's venues. Clwb Ifor Bach currently runs the Swn Festival.

In 2015, Stephens began co-presenting the RTÉ music show Other Voices, featuring performances from the Irish festival, alongside regular presenters Aidan Gillen, Annie Mac and MayKay. He was also the host of that year's BAFTA Cymru awards ceremony, which took place at St. David's Hall in Cardiff in September, and has presented it yearly since. Stephens has presented the Glastonbury Festival coverage for BBC Television since 2015, and Reading Festival.

Stephens was a member of the jury for the 2017 ANCHOR – Reeperbahn Festival International Music Award. He has also been a judge for the AIM Awards.

In November 2020, it was announced that Stephens would be leaving Radio 1, but will continue broadcasting on 6 Music and Radio Cymru.

In March 2022, Stephens was confirmed as the new regular presenter of the weekday evening show at BBC Radio Wales on Monday to Wednesday evenings, with Byd Huw Stephens (renamed Huw Stephens) continuing on BBC Radio Cymru on Thursdays. The Radio Wales show had previously been hosted by Janice Long until her death at the end of 2021. The show on Thursday would be presented by Welsh-Jamaican Reggae artist Aleighcia Scott. However in November 2023, Stephens was replaced on Tuesdays by Molly Palmer and Wednesdays by Bronwen Lewis.

Stephens has also continued presenting television documentaries for S4C and the BBC, including The Story of Welsh Art (2021) and Wales: Music Nation (2022).

On 1 September 2023, it was announced that he will take on BBC Radio 6 Music's drivetime show from Tuesday to Friday, from 8 January 2024, replacing Steve Lamacq who would still continue on the show on Mondays. It was the first 6 Music show to be broadcast live from BBC Cymru Wales' Cardiff headquarters, where Stephens does his other radio shows.

== Personal life ==
Stephens was born in Cardiff, Wales, the son of the author and literary journalist Meic Stephens. He married his longtime girlfriend, Sara, in 2012; they met at Clwb Ifor Bach in Cardiff.

In July 2015, Stephens received an Honorary Fellowship from Bangor University. Among those also receiving the honour that day was his cousin, musician Gruff Rhys. Their mutual grandfather had been president of the students union at the university. In 2011 he was awarded an honorary degree for services to education and culture from the Open University. In 2012 he received an honorary fellowship from the University of Glamorgan.
