= Festival Number 6 =

Art and music festival in Portmeirion, Wales

Festival N°6
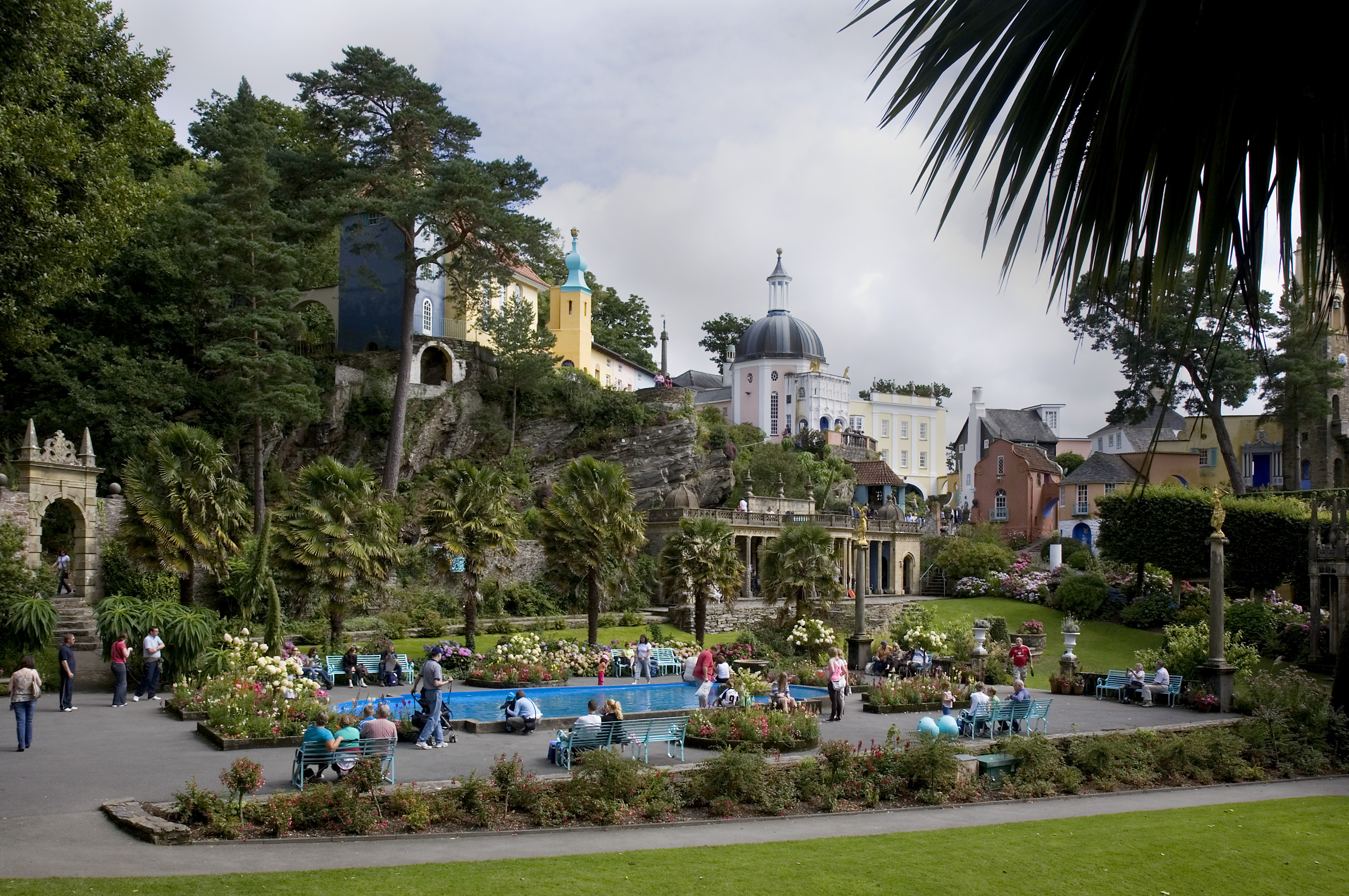
- Central piazza at Portmeirion
- Genre: Music, performance arts, poetry
- Dates: September
- Locations: Portmeirion, Wales
- Coordinates: 52.91778°N 4.09293°W
- Years active: 2012–2018
- Attendance: 6,500
- Website: festivalnumber6.com

Festival N°6 (Festival Number 6) was an annual art and music festival held in and around Portmeirion, Wales. The festival presented a wide range of music genres across multiple stages. It was advertised as a family-friendly festival, and as such various areas of the festival are targeted to families, such as "No.6's Mischief Meadow" for children and a designated family camping area. In 2013 one of the organizers stated that due to the size of the village the festival was not likely to grow beyond 10,000 attendees across the weekend.

In July 2018 the festival organisers announced that the festival would be taking an indefinite break.

== Overview ==
The first event took place on 14 September 2012; around 6,500 people attended the festival. It returned every year until 2018.

=== Village of Portmeirion ===
The festival takes place in North Wales in the village of Portmeirion on the Snowdonia coast in the Welsh county of Gwynedd. The village location is composed of many edifices inspired by the architecture of an Italian coastal town. Portmeirion village was built between 1925 and 1978 by the architect Sir Clough Williams-Ellis. The festival takes place throughout the village, with the main music events located in adjacent fields; the typical Italian infrastructures show an atypical side of Portmeirion village which is part of the festival atmosphere. The music events and activities range from the Colonnade Gardens to the River Dwyryd, from the Tanglewoods to the beach.

=== The Prisoner ===
The festival's name is based on the cult TV show The Prisoner, which was filmed largely on location at Portmeirion. The main character is called "Number 6", and was played by the actor Patrick McGoohan. In the series, Number 6 is a secret agent held as a prisoner in a mysterious coastal village. This TV show is iconic of the village and made it famous internationally.

== Art, culture and other activities ==
The N°6 Festival includes live music, poetry readings, comedy, talks and other cultural activities. The festival also includes a range of participative activities to complement the mainstream music events and develop differentiation from other music festivals. These have included "Giant Mind", "Urban Sketching", and "Extraordinary Bubbles".

The Slow Readers Club released a mini-album on 4 May 2018, recorded with Joe Duddell at Portmeirion Town Hall called Live From Festival No.6.

BBC Radio Wales also regularly broadcast live from the festival, with DJs Adam Walton and Bethan Elfyn presenting shows from the site.

== Artists ==
Since 2012 Festival N°6 has hosted hundreds of musical artists and many other artists performing comedy, talks or performance art. The 2012 festival was in partnership with Electric Elephant Festival. Artists that performed since 2012 have included:

Year	Musical artists	Other artists
2012	François Kevorkian, Erol Alkan, MR.Scruff, Derrick Carter, Sean Johnston, Jerry Dammers, Don Letts, Optimo, Luke Solomon, Daniele Baldelli, Harri & Domenic, PBR Streetgang, Kelvin Brown, Will Tramp, Jonny Trunk, Mike Pickering, Sophie Lloyd, Jon Carter, Dub Pistols Soudsystem, Good Sport, Blonde Ambition, Paradise 45, Pete Hebert, Andrea Trout, New Order, Primal Scream, Spiritualized, Richard Hawley, Gruff Rhys, British Sea Power...	Caitlin Moran (Literature and talks), Phill Jupitus (Comedy), Jan Morris (Literature and talks), Marcus Brigstocke (Comedy), Stuart Maconie (Literature and talks), Propagating Dan (Woodland trails), Andrew Maxwell (Comedy), Simon Day (Literature and talks), Tony Law (Comedy), Evie Wyld (Literature and talks), Wade McElwain (Comedy)...
2013	James Blake, My Bloody Valentine, Manic Street Preachers, Jagwar Ma, Mount Kimbie, Johnny Marr, Frankie Knuckles, Norman Jay, Carl Craig, Andrew Weatherall, Daniel Avery, Daddy G, Geraint Jarman, David Holmes and Andy Votel, Bryn Fôn, Justin Robertson, Crazy P Soudsystem, Horse Meat Disco, Mark Thomas, Seann Walsh, Clinic, Caitlin Rose, Wire, Stuart Maconie, Tricky, Caitlin Moran...	The Brythoniaid male voice choir (Special performances), Joe Duddell (Special performances), John Cooper Clarke (Literature and talks), DBC Pierre (Literature and talks), Paul Morley (Literature and talks), Bob Stanley (Literature and Talks), John Niven (Literature and talks), Joe Dunthorne (Literature and talks), Viv Groskop (Literature and talks)...
2014	Beck, Pet Shop Boys, London Grammar, Bonobo, Neneh Cherry & RocketNumberNine, Steve Mason, Martha Reeves and The Vandellas, Temples, Jimi Goodwin, James Holden, Los Campesinos!, John Wizards, Jon Hopkins, Paul Heaton & Jacqui Abbott, The Undertones, Tom Hickox, Tom Vek, Spector, Toy, Vaults, The Acid, Peter Hook and the Light, Denai Moore, Cherry Ghost, Alexis Taylor, The Radiophonic Workshop, East India Youth, The Rails, All We Are, Arthur Beatrice, Childhood, Telegram...	The Brythoniaid male voice choir (Special performances), Joe Duddell (Special performances), John Robb (Literature and talks), Matt Everitt...
2015	Metronomy, Belle & Sebastian, James, Grace Jones, Mark Ronson (DJ set), British Sea Power, Years & Years, Haelos, Catfish and the Bottlemen, Everything Everything, James Bay, Gaz Coombes, Young Fathers, Kae Tempest, Rae Morris, Shura, Stornoway, The Bohicas, Yws Gwynedd	The Brythoniaid male voice choir (Special performances), Gruff Rhys (Special feature), Irvine Welsh, Bernard Sumner, John Niven, Stuart Maconie, Brix Smith...
2016	Bastille, Hot Chip, Noel Gallagher's High Flying Birds, Super Furry Animals, Kaiser Chiefs, clean cut kid, Gereint Jarman, Bowie Reimagined, Meic Stevens,	Irvine Welsh (Literature and talks), Johnny Vegas (Comedy), Paul Foot, Mark Watson (Comedy), Joe Lycett (Comedy), Holly Walsh (Comedy),...
2017	Liverpool Philharmonic and The Bootleg Beatles, Mogwai, Bloc Party, The Cribs, The Flaming Lips, Rag 'n' Bone Man, Yws Gwynedd, Laura Mvula, Jarvis Cocker, Kae Tempest, Arab Strap, The Cinematic Orchestra, Wild Beasts, Nick Mulvey, Hercules & love affair, Goldie, Charlotte Church, Candelas, Mogwai, Yr Eira	Henning Wehn (Comedy), David O'Doherty (Comedy), Cardinal Burns, The Moomins Live, Irvine Welsh, Mark Oliver, Nish Kumar (Comedy), Rave-a-roo...
2018	The The, Friendly Fires, Franz Ferdinand, The Charlatans, The Horrors, Geraint Jarman, Ride, The Lovely Eggs, Adwaith	Irvine Welsh (Literature and talks), Paddy Considine (Talk), Don Letts (DJ Set), Will Self, The Brythoniaid male voice choir (Special performances)...

== Accommodation ==
During the event, Portmeirion's village offers visitors a limited availability of accommodation in the village itself. Visitors also have the possibility to make a reservation in hotels, bunk houses, cottages, camper vans, yurts, tipis and tents.

== Controversy ==
Ticket prices in 2013 had almost doubled after the success of the first year. In 2016, 200 people had to take shelter in a leisure centre in Porthmadog after the car park for the park-and-ride service flooded and cars became stuck. The organisers were condemned for putting the car park on a flood plain despite having been issued with flood warnings due to heavy rainfall.
