= Clwb Ifor Bach =

Nightclub in Cardiff, Wales

- English: Ivor the Short Club
- Clwb, The Welsh Club
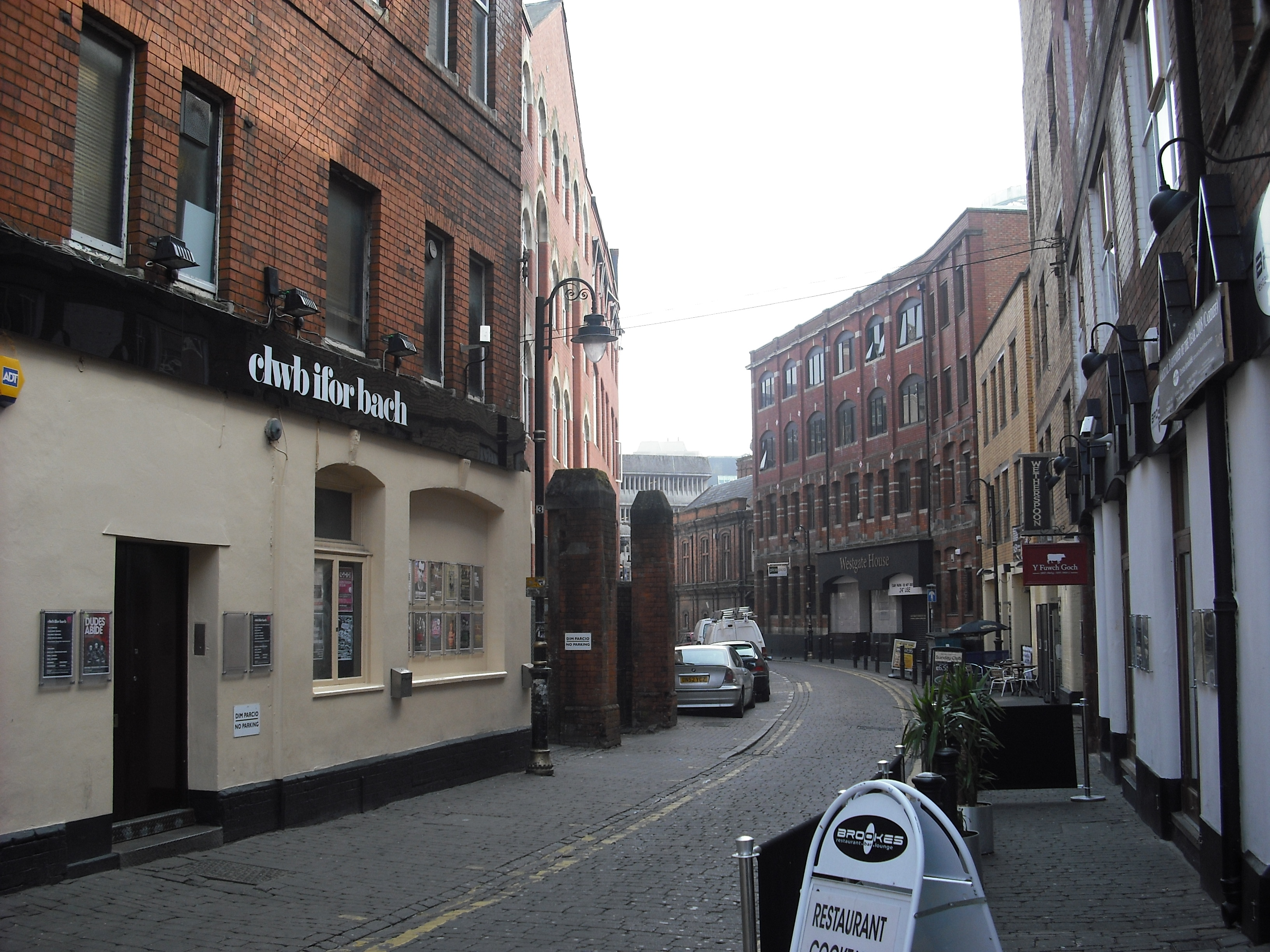
- Clwb Ifor Bach on Womanby Street, Cardiff
- Interactive map of Clwb Ifor Bach
- Address: 11 Womanby Street, CF10 1BR
- Location: Cardiff, Wales
- Coordinates: 51°28′50″N 3°10′53″W
- Owner: Clwb Ifor Bach
- Seating type: Primarily standing, some seating
- Capacity: 380+
- Type: Music venue and Nightclub
- Events: Pop, rock, reggae, folk, hip-hop, dubstep, drum and bass, house, electro, Welsh

Construction
- Opened: 1983

Website
- clwb.net

Clwb Ifor Bach (Welsh pronunciation: [ˈklʊb ˈivɔr ˈbaːχ], meaning Little Ivor's Club) is a Cardiff nightclub, music venue, Welsh-language club and community centre. It is known to the Cardiff Welsh-speaking community as Clwb (English: Club) and is often known by others on the Cardiff music scene as The Welsh Club.

Clwb Ifor Bach is used as a social centre by Welsh-speaking people in Cardiff, as well as by many non-Welsh speakers. Until recent years, the club had several regular members only on nights. This policy has been discontinued. Clwb Ifor Bach is the focal point for many Welsh-medium organisations and events in the area: social, educational, sporting and otherwise. English and Welsh are spoken equally throughout the club, and most staff are required to be bilingual. No anti-Welsh sentiment is tolerated in the club.

== Location ==
Clwb Ifor Bach is located in central Cardiff, halfway down Womanby Street, a lane running from the front of Cardiff Castle, parallel to High Street/St Mary Street). The club faces the rear of a Wetherspoons pub, 'The Gatekeeper'.

== History ==
Clwb Ifor Bach has existed since 1983 and was founded by Cymdeithas Clwb Cymraeg Caerdydd, a society formed with the purpose of establishing a Welsh language social club. The new venue was created inside a former British Legion club on Womanby Street. The chair was Welsh politician Owen John Thomas. The club is named for Ifor Bach, a famous rebel leader against English rule in the 12th century.

In 2017 planning permission was granted to create a Wetherspoons hotel opposite the club and planning permission was also submitted to build six apartments next door. With worries that noise complaints would threaten Clwb Ifor Bach and The Moon Club's existence, the 'Save Womanby Street' campaign was launched by Thom Bentley and Ewan Moor. Following support from Cardiff Council and the local MP's, plans for the flats were withdrawn in September. The Welsh Government said it would consider new planning laws to protect music venues.

== The building ==
The club is contained within an unassuming three-storey building. There is a bar, stage and dance floor on each level, varying in size from level to level. The top floor is the largest. The physical fabric of the club underwent a fairly major overhaul in the 1990s.

In early 2019, Clwb Ifor Bach announced plans to take over the derelict site next door to create new 500-capacity and 300-capacity venues. Cardiff Council had acquired the site next door and would lease it to the club. Designs are by architects Nissen Richards Studio.

== Events ==
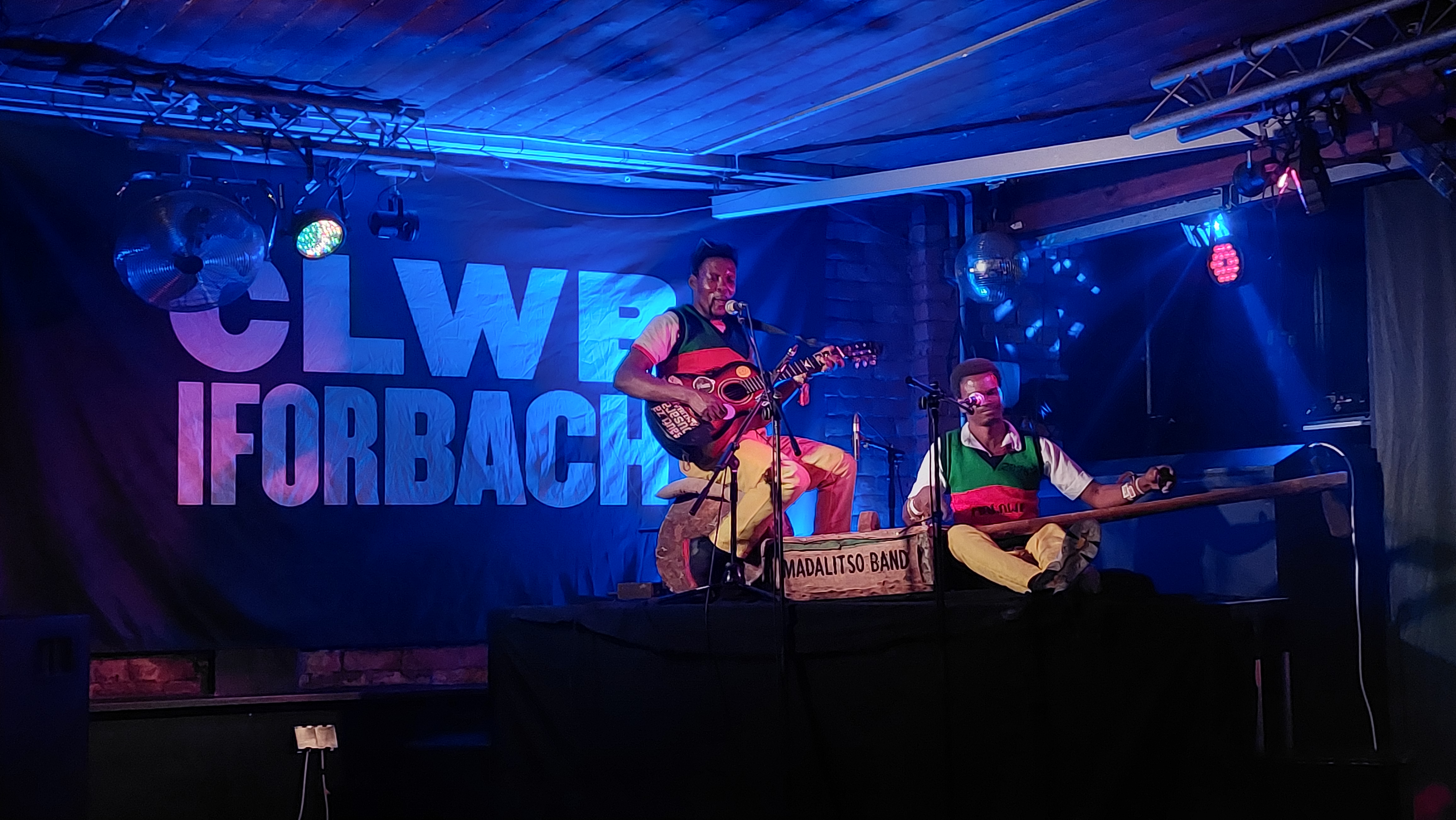
Madalitso Band at Clwb Ifor Bach in August 2023

There are regular performances of live music on the club's stages. There are also regular themed music nights weekly, during which one of the club's floors may be given over to a particular musical genre for an evening. The range of music played is extensive, including genres such as reggae, folk, hip-hop, pop, rock, dubstep, drum and bass, house, electro, Welsh, and more.

In 2014, the club started holding comedy performances from established stand-up and sketch comedians, usually on weeknights.

== Notable performers ==
Notable acts and bands who have performed at the venue include:

- Napalm Death (1988)
- The Strokes
- The Killers (2003)
- Young Fathers
- Super Furry Animals
- Wolf Alice
- Foals (2007)
- Skrillex
- Gilles Peterson
- Peggy Gou (2017)
- Funeral For A Friend (2016)
- Saul Williams
- Joy Orbison
- Gwenno
- Coldplay
- Stereophonics
- Duffy
- Manic Street Preachers
- Wu Lyf (2011)
- Venetian Snares (2005)
- Sion Russell Jones
