= Andrew Falkous =

Welsh musician (born 1975)

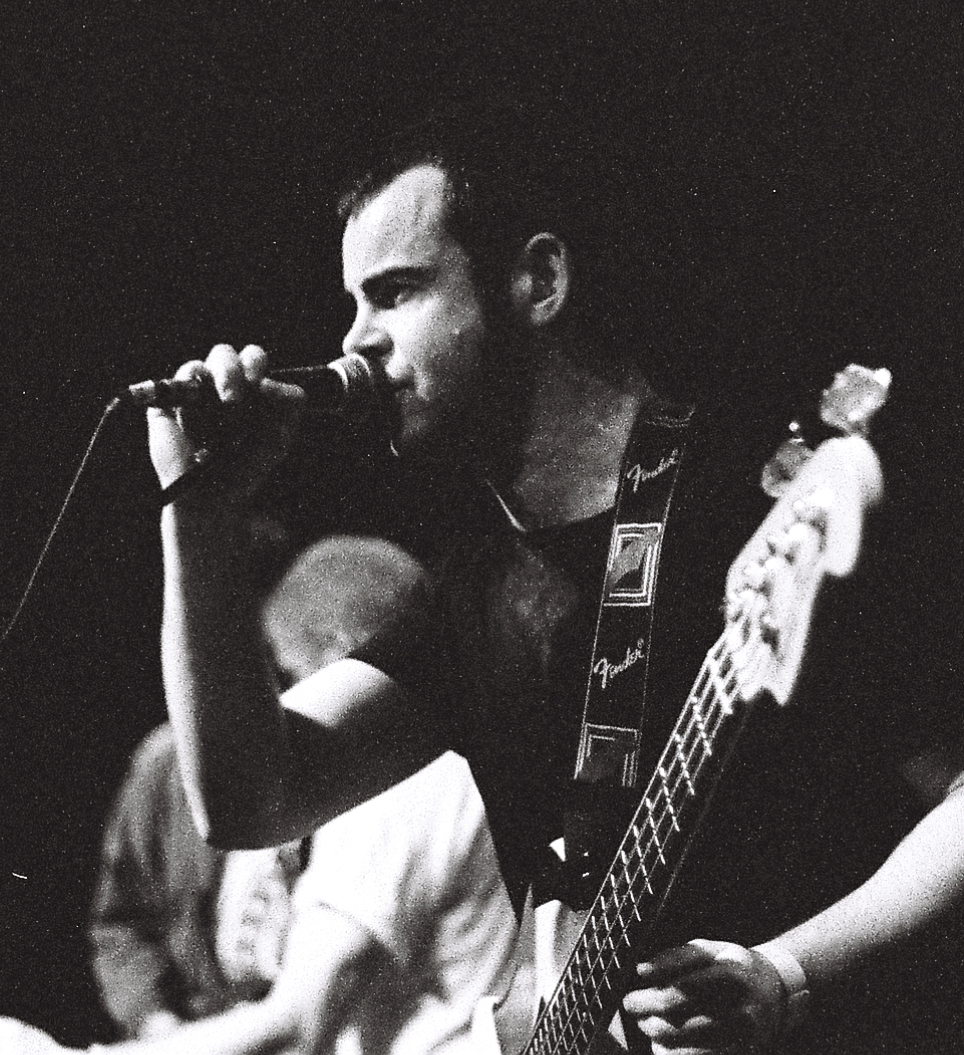
- Falco playing at the Triple Rock Social Club in Minneapolis, 2012

Background information
- Also known as: Falco
- Born: 5 April 1975 (age 51); Newcastle upon Tyne, England
- Origin: Cardiff, Wales
- Genres: Noise rock; post-hardcore; alternative rock
- Years active: 1996–present
- Labels: Too Pure; 4AD; Xtra Mile

Andrew Falkous (born 5 April 1975) is a British musician best known for being the founding member/frontman for the Cardiff-based punk rock outfit Mclusky, current lead singer/guitarist of the band Future of the Left and the sole member of Christian Fitness.

== Music career ==
Falco's professional musical career began in 1996 with the band Best. After a few line-up changes and release of a three-track single Huwuno on London-based label Seriously Groovy, Best changed its name to Mclusky in 1999. The line-up consisted of Falco fronting the band, serving as its main songwriter along with Mat Harding on drums and Jon Chapple on bass/backing vocals.

Falco and Mclusky released its first album My Pain and Sadness is More Sad and Painful Than Yours in 2000 on the Fuzzbox imprint before drawing international attention with their critically praised second album Mclusky Do Dallas in 2002. Harding left the group in 2003 with Falco telling The Telegraph "It was due to differences on just about every imaginable level – personal, musical and professional.". Mclusky recruited drummer Jack Egglestone for their 2004 album The Difference Between Me and You Is That I'm Not on Fire.

On 7 January 2005, Mclusky announced its break-up. Falco released this announcement on the band's website on three days later:

The three piece rock band known as mclusky have disbanded, as of Friday 7 January 2005. The reason for this parting is private, though probably not as entertaining as you'd imagine. Personally, I would like to thank all the people, places and times that occurred on or near us. I'm grateful for the love and to a lesser degree, the hate. There'll be more music soon, from all of us.

Little was said of the reasons behind Mclusky's split, but it later emerged that tensions had arisen between Falco and Chapple.

Falco did not stay silent for long, in 2006, he announced the formation of Future Of The Left with Mclusky drummer Jack Egglestone and former Jarcrew frontman Kelson Mathias assuming bass duties. Their first release was a single, "Fingers Become Thumbs". It came out to minimal fanfare but paved the way for their first CD release Curses on Too Pure Records in September 2007. They followed-up with Travels with Myself and Another in June 2009 on 4AD. NME ranked Future of the Left's 2009 live album Last Night I Saved Her from Vampires at No. 42 on their list of 50 Greatest Live Records of all Time. and Pedestrian TV calling Future of the Left one of the greatest live bands of all time.

In a 2010 interview with NME Falco stated that Mathias was no longer in the band and bassist Julia Ruzicka (also his then girlfriend, now wife) and guitarist Jimmy Watkins have joined the group as a quartet. In late 2011, the band announced they signed to Xtra Mile Records and released the EP Polymers Are Forever and the album The Plot Against Common Sense. In 2013, the band released the album How to Stop Your Brain in an Accident and in 2016 they released the album The Peace and Truce of Future of the Left.

In 2014, Falco released an album under the moniker Christian Fitness titled I Am Scared of Everything That Isn't Me, and in 2015 the follow-up album, Love Letters in the Age of Steam. Christian Fitness's third album, This Taco Is Not Correct, was released on Bandcamp on 12 September 2016. A title revealed on an appearance on Conan Neutron's Protonic Reversal to be random placeholder text from the designer (Aesthetic Apparatus) that he felt made a fitting title. "...that appealed to me that (the random text) would become meaningful and the silhouetted angel is pondering something that is ridiculous, racked with anguish over nothing. As much as all value tacos in their correct context, it just seemed perfect". Christian Fitness's fourth album, Slap Bass Hunks, was released - also via Bandcamp and the label Prescriptions Music, on 19 April 2017.

== Falco vs. illegal music downloading ==
Falco became a surprise player in the debate over illegal musical file sharing when the second Future of the Left album Travels with Myself and Another was leaked online in late April 2009, more than two months before its official release. Falco took to the web and released a seething open letter to those that chose to leak the album, stated that continuing to illegally share music will make it harder for legitimate musicians to continue to make music.

In his letter, Falco stated:

Please be careful, or we'll get the world we all deserve. Hobby bands who can tour once every few years if they're lucky, and the superstars, freed from such inconvenient baggage as integrity and conscience, running the corporate sponsored marathon of £80-a-ticket arena tours and television adverts til their loveless hearts explode in an orgy of oppressive branding and self-regard. Some of us, in all honesty, just want to make the music we love and play it around the world without living in poverty.

UK Music decided to take out a full-page advert in The Guardian, reprinting Falco's letter, making him an advocate for bands and sparking further debate on behalf of artists.

Later, in an interview during a 2011 Australian tour, Falco stated that his "problem comes when people try to say it's a fight against the oppressor", a mentality of sticking it to some faceless entity. He continued to say he has encountered people complaining about paying money to see a band and the cost of an album, but would then turn around and spend more money on a round of drinks at the show.

== Personal life ==
Falco is married to Future of the Left bassist Julia Ruzicka, with whom he has a daughter.

== Discography ==
=== Mclusky ===
- My Pain and Sadness Is More Sad and Painful Than Yours (2000)
- Mclusky Do Dallas (2002)
- The Difference Between Me and You Is That I'm Not on Fire (2004)
- Mcluskyism (2006)
- The World Is Still Here and So Are We (2025)

=== Future of the Left ===
- Curses (2007)
- Last Night I Saved Her from Vampires (2009)
- Travels with Myself and Another (2009)
- The Plot Against Common Sense (2012)
- How to Stop Your Brain in an Accident (2013)
- The Peace & Truce of Future of the Left (2016)

=== Christian Fitness ===
- I Am Scared of Everything That Isn't Me (2014)
- Love Letters in the Age of Steam (2015)
- This Taco is Not Correct (2016)
- Slap Bass Hunks (2017)
- Nuance - The Musical (2018)
- You Are the Ambulance (2019)
- Hip Gone Gunslingers (2021)
