= Music of Cardiff =

Overview of music in Cardiff, Wales

Music of Cardiff, Wales
- Welsh: Cerddoriaeth Caerdydd Cymru
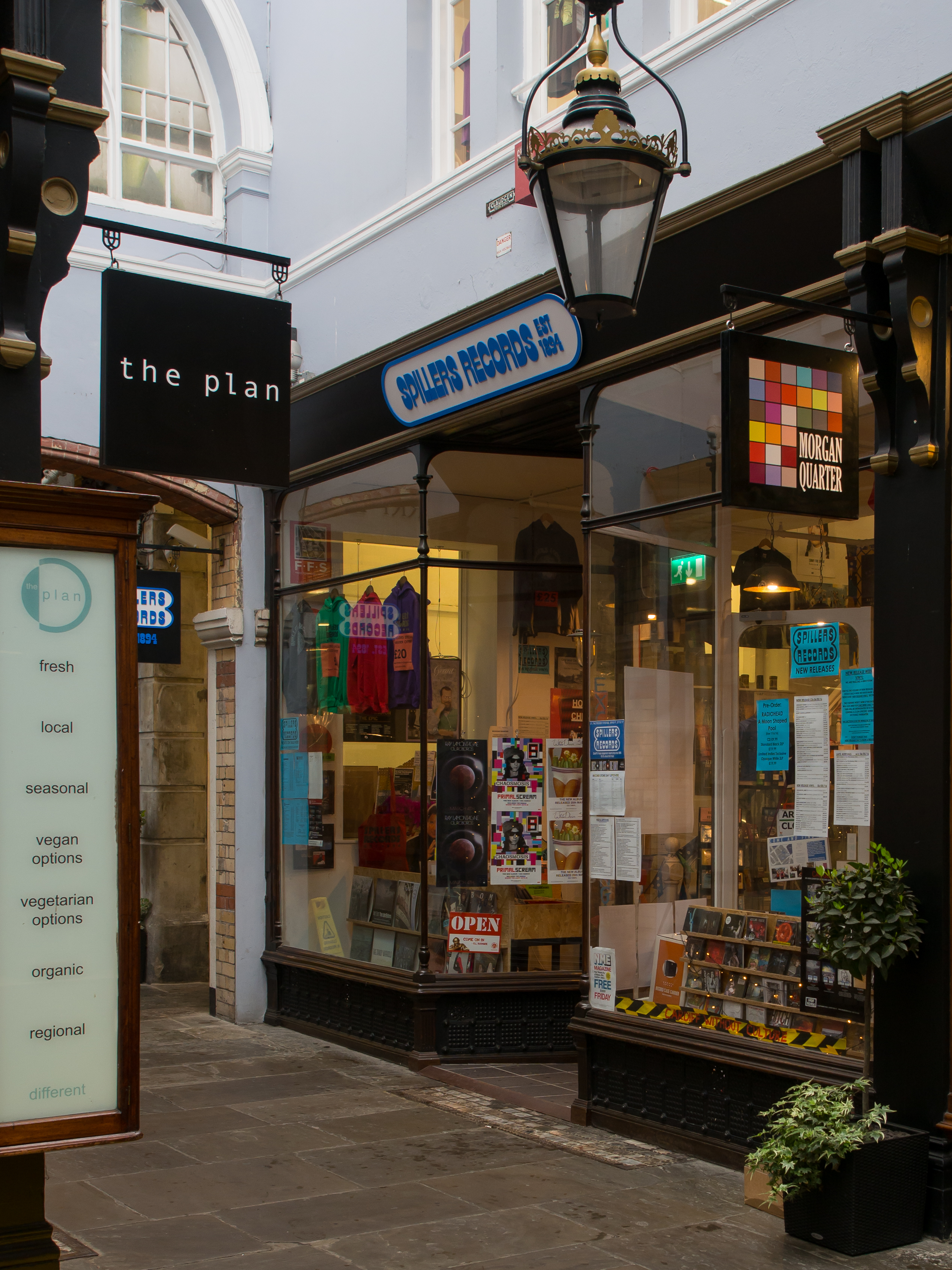
- Spillers Records, the world's oldest record shop
- Location: Cardiff, Wales
- Events: Including rock, metal, Welsh-language music, metalcore and pop music

The music of Cardiff has been dominated mainly by rock music since the early 1990s with later trends developing towards more extreme styles of the genre such as heavy metal and metalcore music. It, along with the nearby music scene in Newport, has brought a number of musicians to perform or begin their careers in South Wales.

Famous Cardiff bands include the post-punk band Young Marble Giants, bands from the Cool Cymru era including Super Furry Animals and Catatonia, as well as the post-hardcore bands Funeral for a Friend and McLusky. The Loves, Los Campesinos!, The School and We're No Heroes are bands who dominate Cardiff's music scene today.

Cardiff is home to the world's oldest record shop, Spillers Records, which was established in 1894, and was situated in The Hayes area of the city centre before relocating to the nearby Morgan Arcade in 2010.

A study by the Performing Rights Society revealed that Cardiff is the second most musical city in the UK based upon the number of bands having their origins in each UK city.

== History ==
=== 1960s-1980s ===
1960s Cardiff produced Amen Corner, one of the top pop acts of the era and the first Welsh group to have a number one hit. Also from the 1960s was Love Sculpture who had a minor hit with Sabre Dance. Love Sculpture featured Dave Edmunds who also had chart hits in the 1960s and 1970s in his own right. In the 1970s and 1980s, the Cardiff music scene was dominated by hard rock and blues bands, and included heavy metal pioneers Budgie. Budgie released a string of hit albums in the 1970s including the gold-certified Bandolier. Budgie's influence reached bands such as Iron Maiden, Metallica, Megadeth, and Van Halen, all of which have covered Budgie's songs at one point or another. Post-punk influences spawned the three-piece Cardiff band Young Marble Giants, who influenced a number of musicians. Young Marble Giants contributed two tracks to Is The War Over?, a compilation featuring unsigned bands from the Cardiff scene.

=== 1990s ===
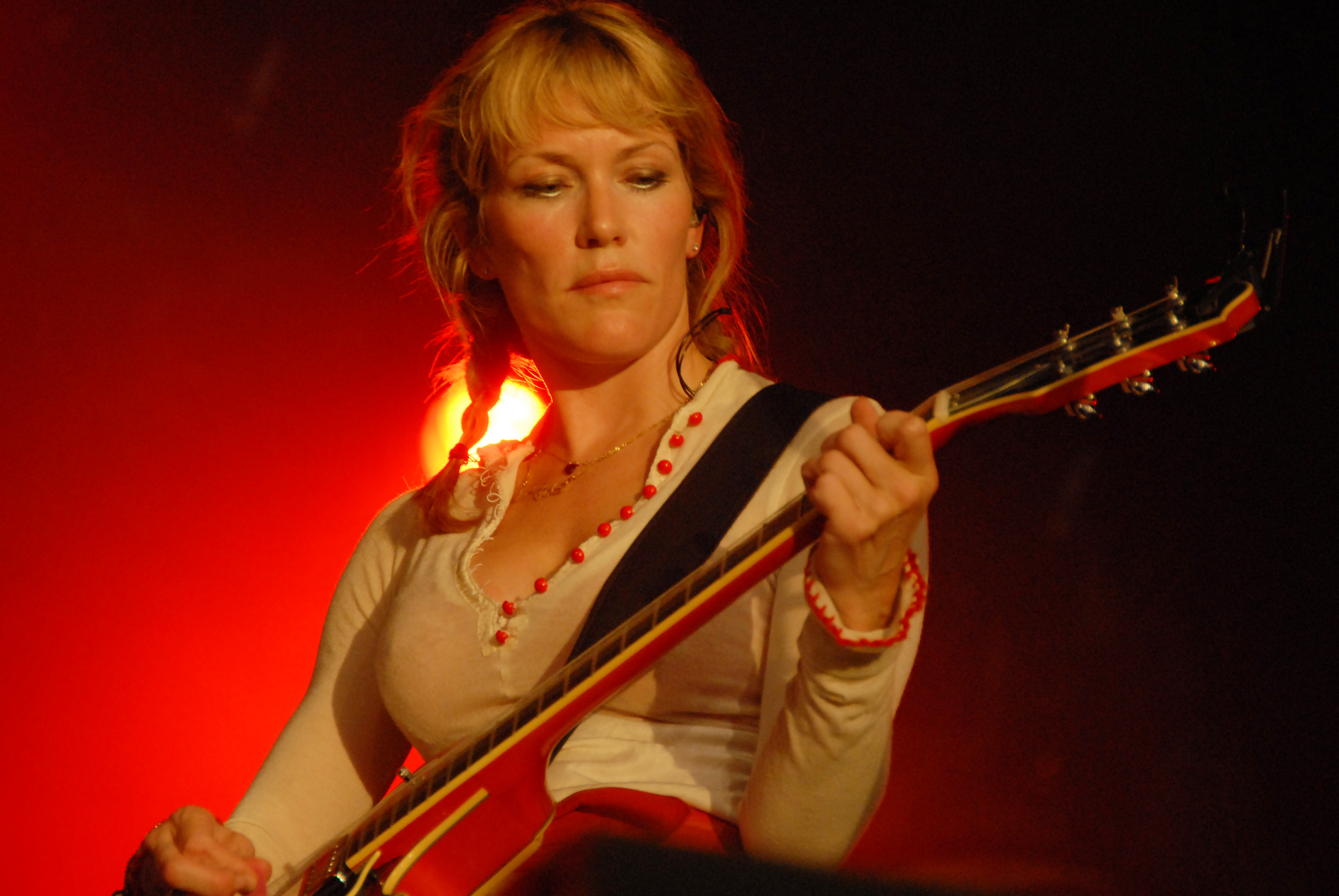
Cerys Matthews of Catatonia, born in Cardiff

In the 1990s, the Welsh capital was the centre of a vibrant music scene led by Manic Street Preachers, Super Furry Animals and Catatonia and many acts had connections nearby Newport during this time which also had an emerging alt rock and indie venue community fuelled by the likes of TJ's.

The scene was populated by a series of smaller often short-lived outfits which made a small but notable local impact. These bands included Ectogram, Crac, Monk Dave, The Pier and The Awkward Moments.

=== 21st century ===
In 2006 The Independent described the Cardiff music scene as "more vibrant and alive than ever", with more promoters, venues, and bands than ever before.

In 2017 Cardiff Council announced they would promote Cardiff as 'Music City'.

==== Rock music ====
Since the 1990s there has been a more steely edge to the sound of the valleys, dominated by metalcore. Most prominent are Bullet For My Valentine, Funeral For A Friend and Lostprophets, who had a number one hit in 2006 with their 3rd album Liberation Transmission on indie rock imprint Visible Noise. Pop rockers, The Automatic, grew out of this scene, playing underage gigs in Cardiff and associating themselves with punk group Jarcrew. Ragga metallers Skindred are also a prominent band on the Cardiff rock scene, known for mixing reggae and alternative rock influences with a more contemporary punk rock and metalcore sound.

Following the success of punk and post-punk music in Cardiff in from the late 1970s until the 1990s, its decline was noticeable in the 2000s with the demise of bands Mclusky and Jarcrew. However, former members of the two bands united to form new Cardiff alternative rock band Future of the Left.

==== Pop-rock music ====
Musical alumni of Cardiff University include pop-rock group Los Campesinos! and Drone, alter ego of Cassidy Phillips, who is part of the area's electronica scene. Acts have been supported by the Welsh Music Foundation (WMF), an organisation set up to support the country's creative industry. Its prime mover is Huw Williams, once a member of 1980s band The Pooh Sticks and former manager of Newport's 60 Ft. Dolls. Local talent is also supported by the likes of Ankst Records, which specialises in Welsh language recordings.

==== Electronic music ====
Another local label is Machine Records that has an electronic preference. When the label started in 2001, there was no scene to connect with, though gradually it has built up a roster of around 25 artists that have come out of the studio and performed live at regular Cardiff showcases and in Newport, Swansea, and London. Between 2003 and 2006 the label also used its monthly Terminal club night to bring UK acts on Warp Records and Planet Mu to Cardiff. Machine Records won 'Best Label' at the Welsh Music Awards in March 2005, and its 2008 compilation 'Machine Music! The New Dance Sound of Cardiff' was selected by DJ Adam Walton as one of the ten best Welsh albums of the decade.

More recently a number of Cardiff acts have found favour on the Dubstep and Electronic Beat scene. Mary Anne Hobbs whilst on BBC Radio 1 included artists such as STAGGA (who died in 2020), Zwolf and Darkhouse Family within her show, whilst other Radio 1 DJs such as Rob Da Bank and Huw Stephens have also included Monky, Curtamos and Ital Lion. Many of these have also been played on influential stations such as Rinse FM and in 2010 BBC 1Xtra invited Chrome Kids to record a mix of Welsh Electronic Music for their 'In New 1Xtra DJs We Trust' show.

==== Rap music ====
Much of the Welsh hip hop activity centres on Cardiff. It has spawned names who have broken out from Wales, touring and gaining steady press attention. Such acts are Barry-based producer Metabeats, rap group Astroid Boys, Beatbox Fozzy, Chrome Kids, Squid Ninjaz, Mudmowth, Brave Mugraw, Y-DUB, Ruffstylz, Blue City and Ralph Rip Shit. Also from the city, in 2009 trio Dead Residents produced Triple Crown, described as "one of the most enjoyable Welsh hip-hop albums in recent memory" by Cardiff-based hip hop journalist Adam Anonymous.

==== Welsh language music ====
Cardiff is home to a number of bands and musicians for whom Welsh is often their language of choice. Currently Fade files is an active electronic Welsh language band based in Cardiff on the dnldr label and is often featured on Rhys Mwyn's show on Radio Cymru. Others include Gorky's Zygotic Mynci, who have now disbanded, though their former members continue to work in and around Cardiff. In 2006 Euros Childs released solo album Chops, while former sidekick Richard James embarked on a more folk 'n' country-influenced direction with The Seven Sleepers Den. They now live in the Pontcanna area of the city along with most of Super Furry Animals. The album was put out on Cardiff's Boobytrap Records, originally set up as a monthly singles club by Booby Baz and Huw Stephens. The latter now promotes Welsh music as a Radio One presenter joined by Dean Proctor.

== Music acts ==
Acts associated with the Cardiff music scene.

- The Alarm
- The Automatic
- Bullet for My Valentine
- Brave Mugraw
- Catatonia
- Cerys Matthews
- Charlotte Church
- Manic Street Preachers
- Super Furry Animals
- Stereophonics
- Funeral for a Friend
- Lostprophets
- Skindred
- Gorky's Zygotic Mynci
- Los Campesinos!
- Kids in Glass Houses
- The Blackout
- Holding Absence
- The Hot Puppies
- Feeder
- McLusky
- The Loves
- Budgie
- The Darling Buds
- Vandal
- Jarcrew
- STAGGA
- Future of the Left
- We're No Heroes
- Spencer McGarry Season
- Winter & Williams Band
- Digvijay Bhonsale (performed locally from 2010 until 2012)
- High Contrast
- Iwan Rheon
- Noel Sullivan
- Shakin' Stevens
- Shirley Bassey
- Sion Russell Jones
- The Oppressed
- Underworld
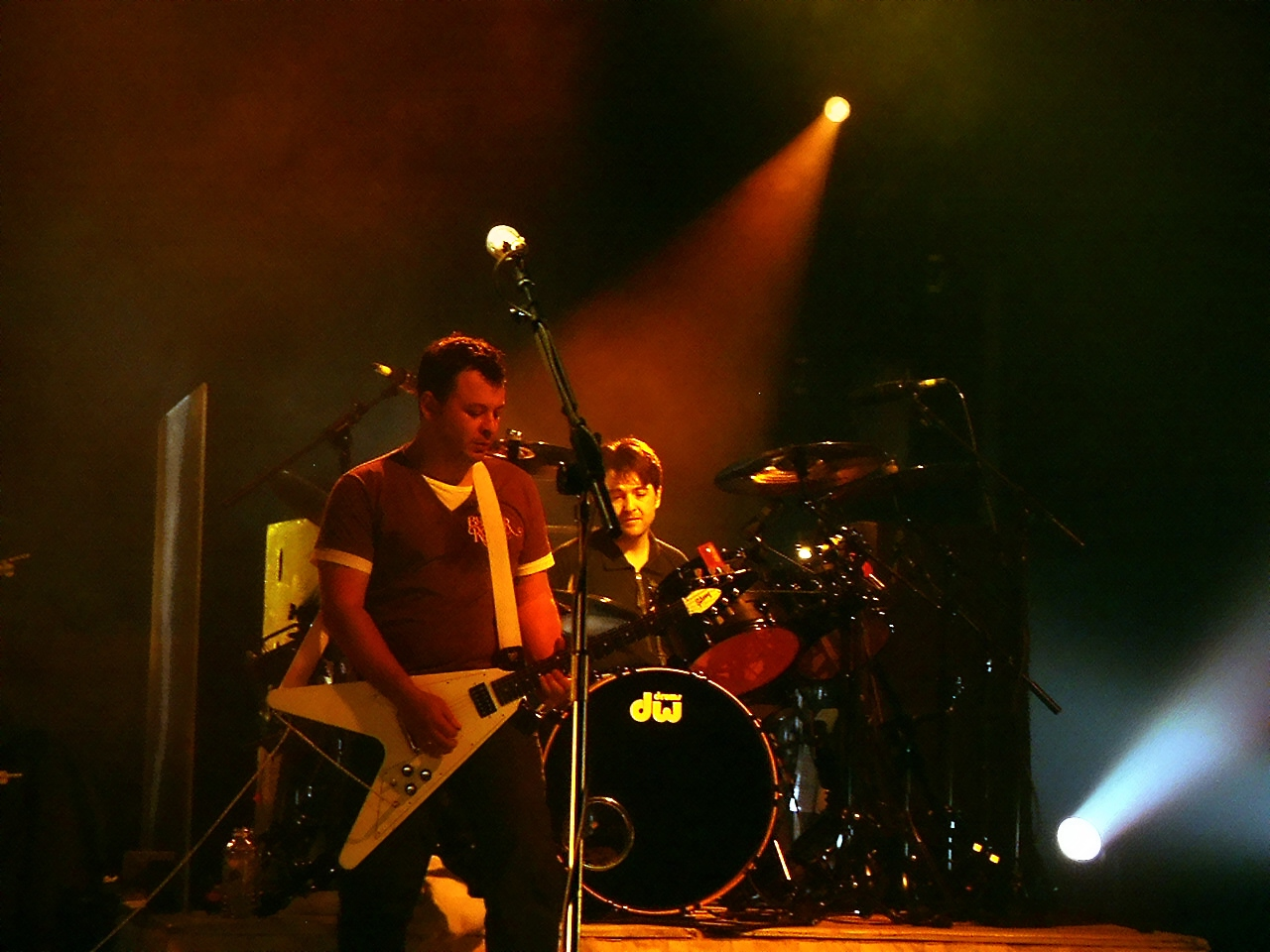
Manic Street Preachers

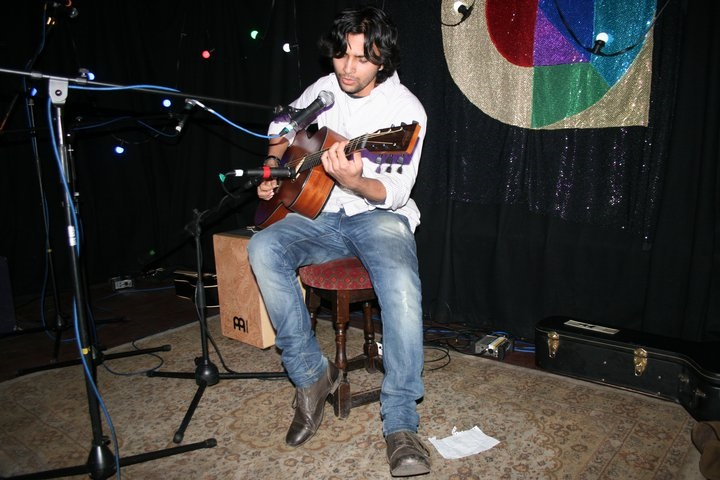
Digvijay Bhonsale

Kids in Glass Houses

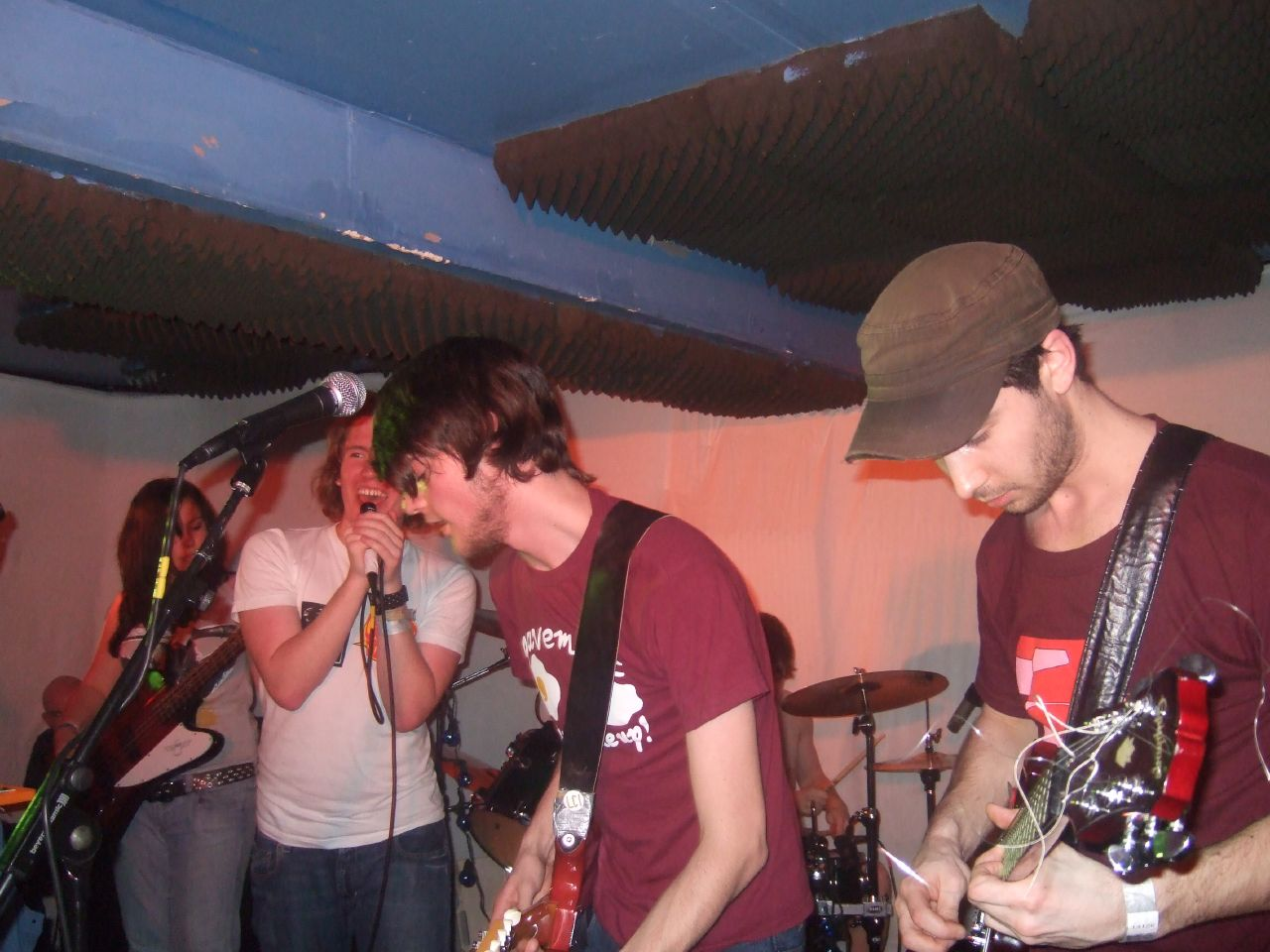
Los Campesinos!

== Festivals ==
=== Cardiff Big Weekend ===
The Cardiff Big Weekend has taken place annually since 1995 as part of the Cardiff Festival organised by Cardiff Council. Billed as the UK's biggest free outdoor music festival, it offers three days of quality live music and entertainment. Alongside the live music stage runs the UK's largest travelling funfair around Cardiff's Civic Centre. Each night comes to a close with a firework finale. There is always a line of up and coming artists, world music and established artists, and traditionally the Friday night has always had a strong presence of Welsh bands.

=== Welsh Language Music Day ===
Welsh Language Music Day is an annual showcase of music performed in the language of Welsh which takes place across venues throughout Wales. Cardiff is a particular centre for events, with performances taking place at venues on Womanby Street throughout the day. Local businesses often participate in the city including John Lewis, The Co-operative, EE, Cardiff Airport, Brains, Lush, Waitrose and Principality Building Society.

=== Other events ===
The Welsh Hip Hop Festival, also known as Roxe Jam, brought together all elements of hip hop culture as a two-day free event in one of Cardiff's largest city parks, in Grangetown, with support from The Arts Council of Wales, Cardiff Council and Communities First Trust Fund and with the help of Welsh hip hop artists.

The Cardiff Multicultural Mela also known as the Cardiff Mela is an annual large-scale outdoor multicultural festival, held in the city's Roald Dahl Plass, in Cardiff Bay. It celebrates many cultural aspects of Asian life, particularly music and dance. The 2009 festival featured bhangra, Bollywood and rnb singers including H Dhami, Mumzy Stranger and Navin Kundra amongst others. The 2010 event attracted over 30,000 visitors and featured a performance from Bombay Rockers.

In the 1990s and early 2000s, Party in the Park was held annually in the city organised by the city's Red Dragon FM.

Cardiff hosts the Welsh Singers Competition every two years at St. David's Hall.

The Under Construction Youth Music Festival started in 2007 and is the result of work from a group of teenagers from the Cathays Youth and Community Centre. The festival hopes to fill a gap in music provision for teens while promoting local talent. The 2010 one-day festival will take place at the Maindy Centre on 14 August, and the main stage will host bands playing music from metal to punk while a newly added acoustic stage will showcase emerging talent from young singer/songwriters. There will also be workshops and activities including a skate ramp, bmx biking, free running and an inflatable football pitch.

In 2011 the inaugural Cardiff Music Festival was launched by Only Men Aloud! member and Cardiff local David Mahoney, with concerts and recitals including an opera gala with Dennis O'Neill, Wynne Evans and Only Men Aloud! director Tim Rhys-Evans.

Stereobrain Records founded Pwer Fest, an indie and pop-funk festival first held Gwdihŵ in 2018 with acts including Dream State and False Advertising. Following the closure of Gwdihŵ, the event moved to Ifor Bach for its 2019 edition before facing subsequent hiatuses.

== Venues ==
=== Cardiff International Arena ===
The Cardiff International Arena (CIA) is one of the largest concert venues in Cardiff and Wales and, has recently played host to Travis, Busted, Duran Duran, Paramore and Blondie. The venue has a capacity 7,500 and is more than often one of the venues visited by the most popular touring acts. The arena is also used for exhibitions, sport and other live events.

=== St David's Hall ===
St David's Hall has over 450 performances a year, including classical music, rock, pop, jazz, children's events, dance and comedy. Past performers include Lemar, Chris Rea and Suzanne Vega. It is situated in The Hayes. St David's Hall is the National Concert Hall and Conference Centre of Wales, and hosts the annual Welsh Proms, an Orchestral Series attracting renowned conductors and performers, and the biennial Cardiff Singer of the World competition.

=== Wales Millennium Centre ===
The Wales Millennium Centre is a performing arts centre in Cardiff Bay, opened in 2004. The centre usually hosts West End musicals, opera, ballet, and contemporary dance.

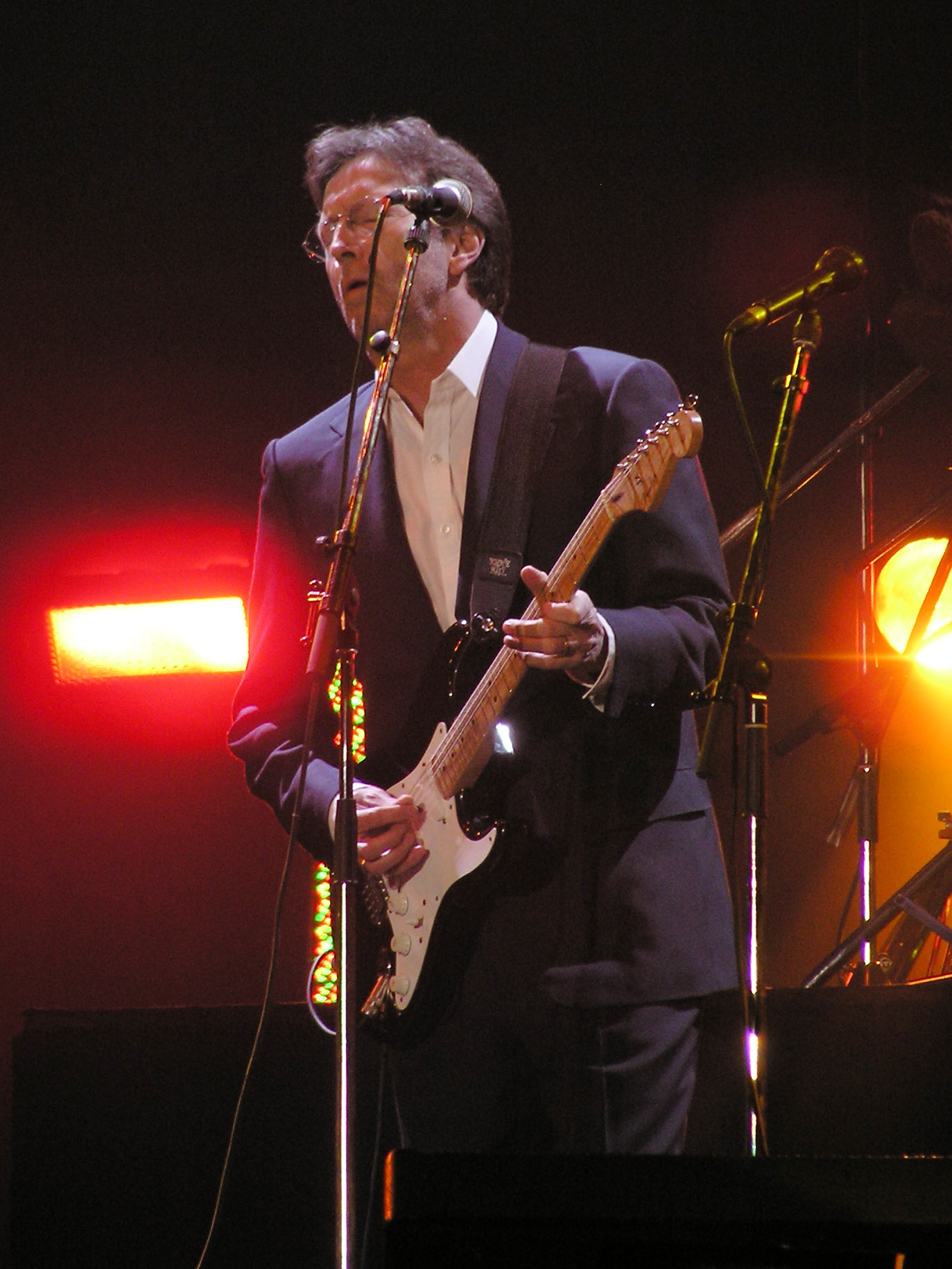
Eric Clapton at the stadium

=== Millennium Stadium ===
With a capacity of 74,500, the Millennium Stadium, national stadium of Wales, hosts only the largest of concerts by the most famous of performers, such as U2, Oasis, Take That, Kasabian, Madonna and Paul McCartney. The stadium has also hosted international music concerts such as Tsunami Relief Cardiff in 2005.

=== Cardiff City Stadium ===
Opened in 2009, the Cardiff City Stadium is a 30,000 capacity stadium owned by and home of Cardiff City Football Club and is rented out to Cardiff Blues RFC. The Stereophonics will be the first group to play at the stadium in June 2010.

=== Cardiff University ===
The Cardiff University Students' Union contains several large and small venues, and its main stage in The Great Hall has previously hosted acts including The Clash, The Jam, The Smiths, INXS, Oasis, Coldplay, The Killers, The Coral, The Polyphonic Spree, Turin Brakes, The Doves, The Darkness, The Thrills, Athlete, Star Sailor, Ben Howard, Foals, Twin Atlantic, and Electric Six in the past. The venue is located on Park Place/Senghenydd Road in Cathays, north of the city centre.

=== The Coal Exchange ===
Formerly the stock exchange for coal in Wales during the 19th century, the Coal Exchange is Van Morrison’s favourite venue and previous concerts include the Eels, Jools Holland and PJ Harvey. It is located in Cardiff Bay.

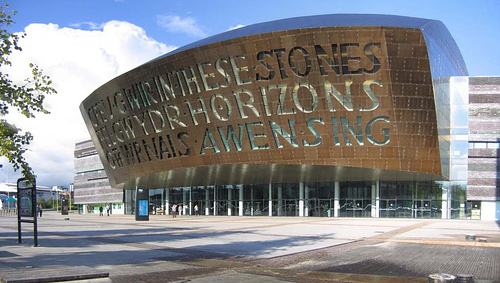
Wales Millennium Centre

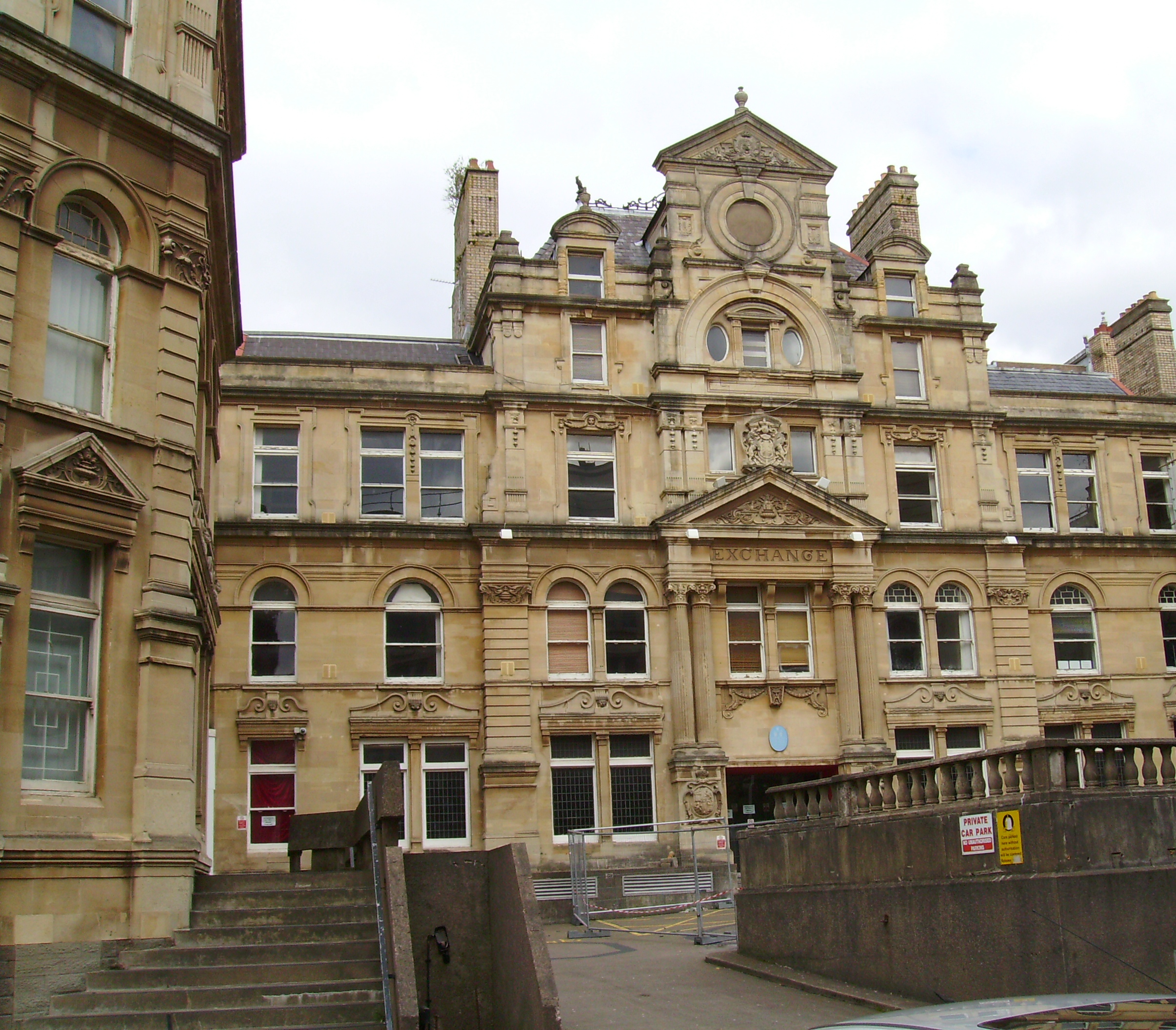
Coal Exchange

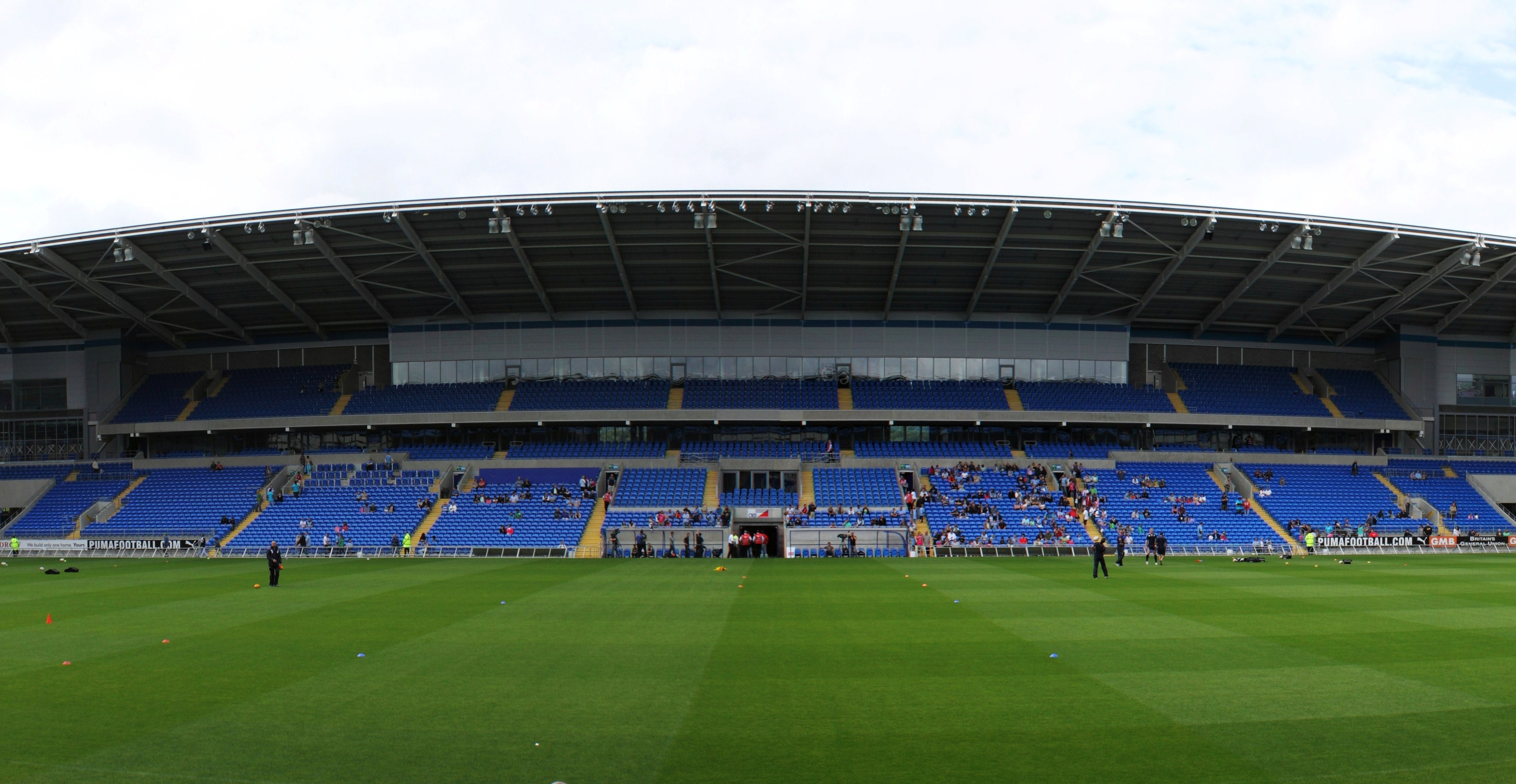
Cardiff City Stadium

=== Smaller venues ===
Clwb Ifor Bach is a principally Welsh-language venue on three levels and caters for anything from hip hop to skate-punk to folk. Past guests include The Strokes, Coldplay, Roni Size and Elbow. The club often hosts new bands on the Cardiff music scene, and gigs of the Sŵn festival. It is located on Womanby Street which has become a common area for music in the city and is located near Cardiff Castle. Metro's is an underground club, popular with students. Goth, metal, grunge and rock are the main genres played here. It is situated near St. Mary's Street. The Engine Rooms in Cardiff Bay equally focuses on rock and metal music.

The city's principal mainstream clubs include Evolution (in the Red Dragon Centre), Oceana, Liquid, The Philharmonic, Exit Club, Bar X, and Walkabout (in the city centre). Moloko's music styles vary throughout the week, from drum n’ bass, to funk and r’n’b. It is situated in The Hayes. Journey's is an independent establishment in the Roath area of Cardiff and frequented by local bands and DJs performing live, from electronica to country music.

A mural promoting Gwenno Saunders' album 'Y Dydd Olaf' on Womanby Street in Cardiff.

The Gate Arts Centre is a live venue which often hosts parts of the Sŵn festival, Wales goes pop! and has hosted bands such as Los Campesinos! The Norwegian Church hosts live music, mainly focusing on world, folk and acoustic artists.

Buffalo Bar was an independent venue with live music from unsigned and local showcases to larger touring bands. In the past the venue has hosted Shonen Knife, James Blake, Times New Viking, Jets to zurich, Marnie Stern, Kissy Sell Out, Ugly Duckling, Simone Felice and Jeffrey Lewis. Sister venue 10 Feet Tall holds intimate folk, acoustic, Americana shows as well as funk, jazz and hip hop, fashion shows, film & literary events. It had a basement venue small live events from local bills to touring bands, reggae, ska, rock, indie and drum'n'bass clubnights. The venue after the covid 19 pandemic closed down, then reopened under new management, only for 8 months before shutting down again.

The Moon (closed as of 2024) reopened as The New Moon (closed 2026), Gassy Jacks, Vulcan Lounge, O'Neils, Pen n Wig, Gwdihw (demolished to make high rise flats). The North Star are some of the small places that promote and host acoustic nights.

=== Grassroots venue closures, protests and change ===
The Moon club in 2013

The closure of multiple live music venues across Cardiff (2019-2026) resulted in protests and the creation of live music initiatives to keep Cardiff's music scene alive.

- Gwdihŵ in 2019
  Gwdihw 2008-2019. The closure sparked immense public outcry, a 20,000-signature petition, and mass protests, though these ultimately could not save the venue.
- The Cardiff Arts Institute hosted arts events most nights, but was described by WalesOnline as "pretentious".
- Buffalo Bar 2005-2019 which had a short lived reopening under new management in summer 2022 closing in may 2023. The original venue saw the likes of Stormzy at the early stages of his career.
- 10 Feet Tall 2008-2020. A venue that Sam Fender played in 2018 (who would go on to sell out the Motorpoint Arena two years later.
- The Moon 2017-2024. Had various other brief iterations such as The Full Moon and The New Moon. With local music artist calling for action.

There are now multiple initiatives and programs in place to help keep Cardiff's grassroots music scene alive including a Cardiff Music Board & Cardiff council grants. However criticism of the Council's conflict of interest with capital projects has continued to lead to criticism from key leaders in the sector.

== Record labels ==
Amongst the notable record labels based in Cardiff are:

- Placid Casual
- Plastic Raygun

== See also ==
- Music of Wales
- Music of Newport
- List of music concerts at the National Stadium, Cardiff Arms Park
