= Shooting at Unarmed Men =

Musical project

- Origin: Cardiff, Wales
- Genres: Post-punk, rock, indie
- Years active: 1999–2009
- Label: Too Pure
- Members: Jon Chapple; Chris Drane; Patrick Walker
- Past members: Richmond Brain; Simon Alexander; Simon Jarvis; Tom Cooper; Julian Tovey; Steve Morgan

Shooting at Unarmed Men was the music project of former Mclusky member Jon Chapple (vocals/guitar), Steve Morgan (drums), and Big Joan member Simon Jarvis (bass). The original bassist for the band's formal incarnation was King Alexander member Simon Alexander (bass/vocals), although the band had existed as a sporadic joke since circa 1999. Alexander also co-wrote the Mclusky song "Chases", from the Mclusky Do Dallas album.

== History ==
They released their first mini-album, Soon There Will Be..., on Too Pure Records, on 17 October 2005. The second, "Yes! Tinnitus!" was released on 22 May 2006 – however, Chapple has since moved to Melbourne for two years (the band played their last gig in the Northern Hemisphere on 16 April 2006 at Cardiff's Clwb Ifor Bach, where Chapple also sold most of his books, videos and some of his records). This was appropriate having told BBC1 that the band's plan to "take it for all its got, sell out and go and live somewhere less shitty than Cardiff."

After emigrating, Chapple assembled the first Australian incarnation of the band with members of the bands The Cheats and Riff Random – Tom Cooper and Julian Tovey. Chapple hinted at the possibility of maintaining two distinct versions of the band in order to play shows on both continents. During October 2006, the band played a weekly residency at the Tote in Melbourne, played at the Melbourne show in the Big Day Out festival in January 2007 and continued to be an active part of the local music scene.

The band released their third album Triptych – a 3 disc record – on 11 August 2007, after which the first Australian line-up was dissolved. The replacements were Richmond Brain on bass (also in Catnip) and Chris Drane on drums (also in A Friend Of Mine, currently in Batpiss). Shortly after recording their fourth and final album in late 2008, With The Youthful Energy of a Zealot, Richmond Brain left the group and was replaced by Patrick Walker (A Friend Of Mine, currently in Farewell Horizontal). The band played their final show on 31 January 2009 at The Tote in Melbourne, launching With The Youthful Energy of a Zealot.

Chapple played drums with Melbourne band Poor People until 2012. He now plays bass in the band Harmony with Tom Lyngcoln of The Nation Blue.

== Discography ==
=== Albums ===
- Soon There Will Be... (17 October 2005)
- Yes! Tinnitus! (22 May 2006)
- Triptych (31 March 2008)
- With The Youthful Energy of a Zealot (31 January 2009)

=== Singles ===
- The Pink Ink (26 September 2005)
- Girls Music (8 May 2006)
- Sometimes The Best Thing You Can Do Is Die (31 March 2008)
