= Mcluskyism =

Compilation album by Mclusky
- Released: 2006
- Genre: Noise rock
- Label: Too Pure
- Producer: Steve Albini

Mclusky chronology
The Difference Between Me and You Is That I'm Not on Fire (2004)	Mcluskyism (2006)	The World Is Still Here and So Are We (2025)

Professional ratings
Review scores
Source	Rating
Allmusic	Single disc version:
Allmusic	Limited Box set:
Pitchfork Media	Single disc version: (8.4/10)
Pitchfork Media	Expanded edition (6.1/10)

Mcluskyism is a compilation album by British rock band Mclusky. A singles and rarities package, it is released in two formats, a one disc singles only package, and a three disc format. On April 18, 2015, it was released as a one disc vinyl edition that was limited to 2000 pressings.

== Track listing ==
Disc One (also the single disc version)

All songs written by Chapple/Falkous/Harding except where noted.

1. "Joy"
2. "Rice Is Nice"
3. "Whoyouknow"
4. "Lightsabre Cocksucking Blues"
5. "To Hell With Good Intentions"
6. "Alan Is a Cowboy Killer"
7. "There Ain't No Fool in Ferguson"
8. "1956 and All That"
9. "Undress for Success"
10. "That Man Will Not Hang" (Chapple/Egglestone/Falkous)
11. "She Will Only Bring You Happiness" (Chapple/Egglestone/Falkous)
12. "Without MSG I Am Nothing" (Chapple/Egglestone/Falkous)
- Tracks 1 & 2 originally released on the album My Pain and Sadness is More Sad and Painful Than Yours.
- Tracks 3–6 originally released on the album Mclusky Do Dallas.
- Tracks 7 & 8 originally released as the double a-side single There Ain't No Fool in Ferguson/1956 and All That.
- Track 9 originally released on the Undress for Success single.
- Tracks 10–12 originally released on the album The Difference Between Me and You Is That I'm Not on Fire. Track 12 is curiously credited to Chapple/Egglestone/Harding in the Mcluskyism liner notes, while in the liner notes for The Difference Between Me and You Is That I'm Not on Fire, it is credited to Chapple/Falkous/Harding.

Disc Two (b-sides and rarities)

1. "Rock vs. Single Parents"
2. "Why I Don't Believe in You"
3. "Balbos Theme"
4. "Viva Minor Legends"
5. "Whiteliberalonwhiteliberalaction"
6. "Murphy Syndrome"
7. "Provincial Song"
8. "Here Comes Joe"
9. "Love Song for a Mexican" (second version)
10. "Rope!"
11. "No Covers"
12. "Beacon for Pissed Ships"
13. "The Habit That Kicks Itself"
14. "Exciting Whistle Ah" (demo)
15. "Random Celebrity Insult Generator" (SBN session)
16. "Hymn for New Cars"
17. "Join the Mevolution"
18. "The Salt Water Solution"
19. "The All Encompassing Positive"
20. "The London Whine Company" (Chapple/Egglestone/Falkous)
21. "The Gift of Slight" (Chapple/Egglestone/Falkous)
22. "Dave, Stop Killing Prostitutes" (Chapple/Egglestone/Falkous)
- Tracks 1–3 released as b-sides to Joy. "Why I Don't Believe in You" was released under the title "A1 Song". "Balbos Theme" is listed as a demo on the single release. "Rock vs. Single Parents" was also released on My Pain and Sadness is More Sad and Painful Than Yours.
- Track 4 originally released as a b-side to the Huwuno single, issued under the band's original name, Best. It was rereleased as a hidden track on the "Joy" single at the end of "Balbos Theme (Demo)".
- Tracks 5–8 released as b-side to the Rice is Nice single. "Whiteliberalonwhiteliberalaction" was also released on My Pain and Sadness is More Sad and Painful Than Yours.
- Tracks 9 and 10 released as b-sides to the Whoyouknow / Love Song for a Mexican single. Track 10 appears as a hidden track.
- Tracks 11–13 released as b-sides to To Hell With Good Intentions. "No Covers" was also released as the b-side to "Lightsabre Cocksucking Blues" 7".
- Tracks 14 & 15 released as b-sides to Alan is a Cowboy Killer.
- Track 16 released the b-side to There Ain't No Fool in Ferguson/1956 and All That.
- Tracks 17 & 18 released as b-sides to Undress for Success.
- Tracks 19 & 20 released as b-sides to That Man Will Not Hang. "The London Whine Company" is listed as a demo on the single release.
- Tracks 21 & 22 released as b-sides to She Will Only Bring You Happiness.

Disc Three (unreleased)

1. "Love Song for a Mexican"
2. "Colour March"
3. "Working From Home"
4. "Collagen Rock"
5. "The Difference Between Me and You Is That I'm Not on Fire"
6. "Reformed Arsonist Seeks Child Bride"
7. "Be Average to Each Other"
8. "Cradling"
9. "Bipolar Bears Take Seattle"
10. "KKKitchens, What Were You Thinking?" (Chapple/Egglestone/Falkous)
11. "Lost Consonants" (Chapple/Egglestone/Falkous)
12. "Comeuppance Come" (Chapple/Egglestone/Falkous)
13. "See Them Smell Them Sign Them" (Chapple/Egglestone/Falkous)
14. "Lightsabre Cocksucking Blues" (live at ULU)
15. "That Man Will Not Hang" (live at ULU) (Chapple/Egglestone/Falkous)
16. "1956 and All That" (live at ULU)
17. "Falco vs. the Young Canoeist" (live at ULU) (Chapple/Egglestone/Falkous)
18. "You Should Be Ashamed, Seamus" (live at ULU) (Chapple/Egglestone/Falkous)
19. "Gareth Brown Says" (live at ULU)
20. "Rice Is Nice" (live at ULU)
21. "Collagen Rock" (live at ULU)
22. "To Hell With Good Intentions" (live at ULU)
