= To Hell with Good Intentions =

To Hell with Good Intentions may refer to:

- A 1968 speech by Ivan Illich
- A 2002 song by Welsh band Mclusky, appearing on their album Mclusky Do Dallas
