= Curses (Future of the Left album) =

Curses!

Studio album by Future of the Left
- Released: September 24, 2007
- Genre: Post-hardcore, noise rock
- Label: Too Pure
- Producer: Richard Jackson

Future of the Left chronology
Curses! (2007)	Last Night I Saved Her From Vampires (2008)

Singles from Curses!
- 1. "Fingers Become Thumbs / The Lord Hates A Coward" Released: 29 January 2007; 2. "Adeadenemyalwayssmellsgood" Released: 4 June 2007; 3. "Small Bones Small Bodies" Released: 10 September 2007; 4. "Manchasm" Released: 8 April 2008

Professional ratings
Review scores
Source	Rating
AllMusic	3/5 stars
Crawdaddy!	(favorable)
NME	(8/10)
Pitchfork Media	(8.0/10)

Curses! is the debut release of Welsh band Future of the Left, released by Too Pure in 2007.

== Track listing ==
1. "The Lord Hates a Coward" – 3:34
2. "Plague of Onces" – 3:03
3. "Fingers Become Thumbs!" – 1:50
4. "Manchasm" – 3:54
5. "Fuck the Countryside Alliance" – 2:06
6. "My Gymnastic Past" – 2:30
7. "Suddenly It's a Folk Song" – 2:55
8. "Kept by Bees" – 1:54
9. "Small Bones Small Bodies" – 2:22
10. "Wrigley Scott" – 2:06
11. "Real Men Hunt in Packs" – 3:27
12. "Team:Seed" – 1:19
13. "adeadenemyalwayssmellsgood" – 3:09
14. "The Contrarian" – 3:02
- The iTunes version of the album contains the bonus track "I Need to Know How to Kill a Cat"
- The Japanese version includes the above bonus track and "The Big Wide O".
- Both tracks were previously released as B-sides on the Small Bones Small Bodies single.

== Personnel ==
- Andrew Falkous – Guitar, Piano, Keyboards, Vocals
- Kelson Mathias - Bass, Vocals
- Jack Egglestone - Drums
- Sean McGee – Mastering
- Richard Jackson - Engineering, Production
- Jim 'Jim' Anderson - Engineering
