= Triptych (Shooting at Unarmed Men album) =

Studio album by Shooting at Unarmed Men
- Released: 11 August 2007
- Genre: Alternative rock
- Label: Too Pure
- Producer: N/A

Shooting at Unarmed Men chronology
Yes! Tinnitus!	Triptych (2007)	With The Youthful Energy of a Zealot (2009)

Triptych is an album by Welsh–Australian band Shooting at Unarmed Men. Their third release, the album consists of three CDs. It was released in Australia on 11 August 2007 and set for a worldwide release on 31 March 2008.

== Track listing ==
=== CD 1 ===
1. " The Best Thing You Can Do Is Die"
2. "This Song Comes with a Picture"
3. "The Things You Can And Cannot Do"
4. "The Conventions of Stopping"

=== CD 2 ===
1. "Boredom Is the Feeling That Everything Is a Waste of Time"
2. "Pre-Seated"
3. "The Cock-a-Doodle-Doo of Democracy"
4. "Full-Proof Plan for Successful Living"

=== CD 3 ===
1. "_ _ _ _ _ _ _ _ _ _ _ " (Peristalsis)
2. "Sailing Keeps You Safe
3. "Happy Birthday Placenta"
4. "The Fortune of Regret"
5. "Missed Opportunities"
