= Jimmy Watkins (runner) =

Welsh runner (born 1982)

James Watkins
Personal information
- Born: 30 October 1982 (age 43)

Sport
- Country: Great Britain
- Sport: Athletics
- Event: 800 metres

Achievements and titles
- Personal bests: 800m: 1:46.33 (2006); 800m indoor: 1:47.23 (2006)

Jimmy Watkins (born 30 October 1982) is a Welsh 800 metres runner and musician.

In 2006, Watkins won the AAA Indoor Championships 800 metres in Sheffield and qualified for the IAAF World Indoor Championships; he ran an indoor best of 1:47.23 in the semi-final, and came 6th in the final. Later that year, Watkins ran an outdoor best of 1:46.33 at the British Milers' Club Grand Prix in Watford.

Two years later, he gave up running and decided to pursue a career in music. He joined the rock band Future of the Left although left after all the other band members felt "there were things [they] couldn't do because he was in the band" Later, Watkins joined The Vega Bodegas, although he quit after a couple of years.

In 2019, Watkins returned to running, now combined with his love of music. He joined the club Running Punks, which had been founded by his former friend Rhodri Morgan. He has also maintained a social media presence with his videos reviewing albums and singles as he runs.
