= Winter & Williams Band =

Cardiff-based alternative acoustic band

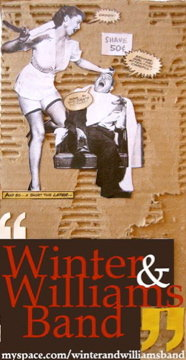
Winter & Williams Band logo

Winter and Williams Band (W&W Band) are an alternative acoustic band from Cardiff, Wales, which formed in 2006. The band's current line-up includes singer/songwriter Peter Winter (guitar/vocals), bassist Deej Williams, violinist/vocalist Ellie Burton and drummer Tom Rabaiotti. Former members included co-songwriter Gareth Williams (guitar/vocals), bassist Mark Watson, drummer Ben Harris, saxophonist Tom Jackson (Whistling Biscuits, Sweet Baboo, Truckers of Husk, Spencer McGarry Season) and percussionist Samuel Bigot (Prisoners of the Sun).

W&W Band have played a variety of venues in the city including The Point, Cardiff, Clwb Ifor Bach, Chapter Arts Centre, Cardiff University Students' Union, Cafe Jazz and Wales Millennium Centre including some Cardiff-based festivals, such as: Free for all Festival (2013) and HUB Festival (2014). The band was included as part of a best new music in Wales feature in Wales Online and recommended by journalist David Owens as one of the bands to see at HUB Festival 2014.

The band has received airplay on BBC Radio 6 Music, BBC Radio Wales, Amazing Radio, London Cafe CISM 89.3, Nation Radio, 106.8, GTFM 1079, Cardiff University's Xpress Radio and Radio Cardiff. Anecdotally, the band has received high plaudits from those associated with the Cardiff music scene:

"Working hard and providing an awesome sound in Cardiff, they are Winter & Williams band and their fusion of acoustic beauty with hints of soul and funk will blow you away"
(Owen Bowley – Booking Manager for The Moon Club, Cardiff; June 2013)

"Funky Jazzy 4 piece. Acoustic Soul and tight riffery give this band a groove that will make your head nod like a jibba jabba..... slick outfit"
(James Hassan, Cassette Quality, Feb 2009)

“Through creative lyrics and rhythms played on a range of instruments, the Winter & Williams band created a sound that was not only unique to themselves but also provided something that everyone could relate to.”
(Luke Todd, Oxjam event Organiser, October 2007)

"Winter & Williams Band and their smooth, soulful grooves are just what we want coming out of our studio. I wouldn't dream of listening to anything else, they're just too smooth!"
(Pete Cottell – general manager of Clearline studios, 2006)

== Past and present ==
=== EP 1 and EP 2 (Past) ===
Between 2006 and 2009, W&W Band released two four-track studio EPs and a live EP recorded in Cafe Jazz, Cardiff. Both studio EPs were recorded by drummer Ben Harris and mixed by the band. EP 2, in particular, was mastered by Donal Whelan at Hafod Mastering. Less than two months after the release of EP 2, Mark Watson and Ben Harris announced their departure from the band. Winter and Williams (as a duo) decided to promote EP 2 and continued to write and play with the idea of reforming the band. During this time the band were invited to play a night compèred by Bethan Elfyn in Buffalo Bar, Cardiff. However, the band had officially disbanded by then with Peter and Gareth obligated to fulfil the booking. This happened to be the last time the two songwriters played on stage together as Gareth Williams soon parted ways. Consequently, Peter continued to play solo supporting a variety of singer/songwriters, such as Christopher Rees.

In 2011 founding member Peter Winter decided to reform the band with fellow Cardiff musicians Deej Williams (Sion Russell Jones) and Tom Rabaiotti (AfroCluster). Since 2011, Peter has enlisted the help of a number of Cardiff musicians for live and studio sounds, including: Dave Morris (Vocals), Ellie jayne Burton (Violin/Vocals), Callum Duggan (Double bass), Francesca Dimech (Trumpet), Ian Perry (Trombone) and Gareth Evans (French horn/Trombone).

=== EP 3 (Present) ===
W&W Band released their third studio EP (recorded and mixed by Llion Robertson) on 5 June 2014 supported by the single "Blueberry Song". A promo video of the single with footage from the EP launch was filmed by Cardiff filmmaker Simon Bartlett.

=== EP 3 Reviews ===
"The bands third EP (EP 3) is a collection of four tracks, each invariably different to the last. The songs strike an excellent balance between rhythmic melancholy and powerful catchy beats." (Matthew Robson, Secret Sounds UK)

"The band’s genre is hard to pin down which is probably a good thing. Touches of jazz, folk and even mild funk combine to produce a fine landscape." (Francis, NewSound Wales)

"This is music for the summer and the blend of finely crafted songs arranged with delightful acoustic guitar riffing, super bass lines, glove fit in the pocket drums and euphonus vocal harmonies." (SoundCloud reviews)

EP 3 was supported by the single "Blueberry Song", which was also met with positive feedback:

"This track is fairly progressive in nature, beginning with a funky guitar pattern and zealous vocals overlapping a relaxed, steady groove before rather abruptly hightailing to even calmer and more euphonious musical pastures." (Charlie Piercey, South Wales Music Journalist)

=== "Hills and Shadows" (standalone single) ===
On 15 December 2014, W&W Band released the single "Hills and Shadows" recorded with Van Morrison musician Richard Dunn and features Welsh string quartet The Mavron Quartet.

Reviews:

"This acoustic song has a simple but effective melody and the combination of Peter Winter’s breathy vocals and backing vocals from Ellie Burton is a winning combination. The classy Robert Kirby style string arrangement helps brings an added dimension and depth to the song." (Francis Brown, NewSound Wales 2015)

"...Most noticeable is some beautiful counterpoint in the guitar playing which melds nicely with the delicate string arrangement; this really would be a joy to see live." (Charlie Piercey, Buzz Magazine 2015)

== Discography ==
Between 2006 and 2009 the band's discography consisted of two studio EPs and two live EPs. Before Ben Harris and Mark Watson joined Winter & Williams performed and recorded as a duo, and had a number of demo's and home recordings.

- Winter & Williams: Live at the Engine Rooms, Mount Stuart square, Cardiff (2003) [Unreleased]
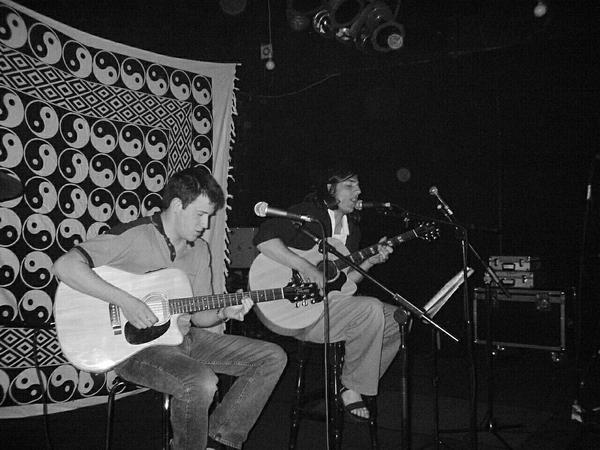
  Winter & Williams live at Cardiff Engine Rooms (2003)
- Winter & Williams: 4 track demo. Recorded by Keith Holmes (2004) [Promo]
- Winter & Williams: Bedroom recordings. Recorded by Joe Pearson (2005) [Unreleased]
- Winter & Williams Band: EP 1 (2007)
- Winter & Williams Band: Live at the Point, Cardiff (2008) [Unreleased]
- Winter & Williams Band: Live at Cafe Jazz, Cardiff (2008)
- Winter & Williams Band: EP 2 (2009)
- Winter & Williams Band: EP 3 (2014) (Recorded, Produced and Mixed by Llion Robertson)
- Winter and Williams Band: "Blueberry Song" - Single

== Family connection ==
Peter is the great nephew of visionary Welsh painter Ernest Zobole.
