= BBC Radio 2 Electric Proms =

Former music festival in London, England

- 2010 logo
- Genre: Pop music
- Dates: October
- Years active: 2006–2010
- Website: www.bbc.co.uk/radio2/electricproms

The BBC Radio 2 Electric Proms (formerly the BBC Electric Proms) was an October pop music festival in London run by the BBC for five years, 2006–2010. On 31 January 2011, the BBC announced that the event would be discontinued with immediate effect due to financial cutbacks.

The name was taken from The Proms, a classical music festival running since 1895, and borrowed a few traditions from its counterpart such as the final night culminating in an interpretation of "Land of Hope and Glory". The musical performances at the festival typically involved indie rock bands incorporating instruments outside of their usual arrangement, most commonly in the form of collaborations with the BBC Concert Orchestra.

Primarily the festival's headline acts played at The Roundhouse in Camden but events, which included a programme of film, were not limited to this venue. For example, acoustic events took place at Cecil Sharp House. In 2008 in acknowledgement of its status as European Capital of Culture, events were staged in both Liverpool and London.

In Australia, this program started airing on ABC2 from 1 May 2009 with episodes in a scattered order.

== 2010 line-up ==
The 2010 event (rebranded as the BBC Radio 2 Electric Proms) took place solely in The Roundhouse and ran from Thursday 28 October to Saturday 30 October. The entire event catered to the Radio 2 audience, whereas previously the Electric Proms events featured the involvement of all four of the BBC's national popular music stations.

There were three acts, which were announced by Chris Evans on BBC Radio 2.

=== 28 October ===
Elton John (collaborators – Leon Russell, Plan B, Rumer)

=== 29 October ===
Robert Plant (collaborators – Band of Joy, London Oriana Choir)

=== 30 October ===
Neil Diamond with Lulu and Amy MacDonald

== 2009 line-up ==
The 2009 event took place solely in The Roundhouse and ran from Tuesday 20 October to Saturday 24 October.

=== 20 October ===
Robbie Williams (Musical Director – Trevor Horn)

=== 21 October ===
Dizzee Rascal with The Young Punx and the Heritage Orchestra. (Musical Director – Hal Ritson)

BBC Radio 1Xtra After Party (Studio Theatre)

=== 22 October ===
London:Doves with the London Bulgarian Choir and arrangements by Avshalom Caspi; Magazine

Manchester: Florence + the Machine; Metronomy

=== 23 October ===
Shirley Bassey with the BBC Concert Orchestra; Richard Hawley

=== 24 October ===
Roundhouse: Smokey Robinson and his band with the BBC Concert Orchestra

== 2008 line-up ==
=== 22 October ===
London: Burt Bacharach with the BBC Concert Orchestra; XX Teens; Wild Beasts; Africa Express; Goldfrapp

Liverpool: Tony Christie

=== 23 October ===
London: The Streets; Santogold; Keane; Maddy Prior

Liverpool: BBC Merseyside Peel Night – Milanese; Rolo Tomassi; 2 Hot 2 Sweat

=== 24 October ===
London: Nitin Sawhney and the London Undersound Orchestra

Liverpool: The Last Shadow Puppets; Stephen Fretwell; BBC Merseyside event with Steve Lamacq

=== 25 October ===
London: Saturday Night Fever curated by Robin Gibb, with special guests Ronan Keating, Stephen Gately, Sam Sparro, Sharleen Spiteri, Gabriella Cilmi and Bryn Christopher; Justice, Coldcut via The Radiophonic Workshop; Red Light Company; Fox Cubs; Micachu

Liverpool: Razorlight; Kitty Daisy and Lewis; Thomas Tantrum; Esser

=== 26 October ===
London: Oasis with the Crouch End Festival Chorus; Glasvegas; Lowkey; BBC Introducing – Pete and the Pirates; General Fiasco; Pull in Emergency; Chew Lips

Liverpool: Wave Machines; The Maybes?; Candie and Howard; Elliott Payne

== 2007 line-up ==
=== 24 October ===
Mark Ronson and the BBC Concert Orchestra (with guests Daniel Merriweather, Charlie Waller, Candie Payne, Wale, Ricky Wilson (substituting for Lily Allen), Sean Lennon and others); The Coral; Editors; Blanche; Charlie Louvin; Sigur Rós; Siouxsie Sioux; Agaskodo Teliverek; Daft Punk's Electroma; The Beatles' Help!; Radio Luxembourg

=== 25 October ===
Paul McCartney; Soil & "Pimp" Sessions with Jamie Cullum; Hadouken!; The Enemy; The Chemical Brothers; Justice; Tribute to Lal Waterson

=== 26 October ===
Kaiser Chiefs via David Arnold; Reverend and The Makers; New Cassettes; Cold War Kids; The Metros; Daler Mehndi and The Wolfmen; Bishi; Basquiat Strings with Seb Rochford, Ellery Eskelin and Simon H Fell

=== 27 October ===
Bloc Party in The Roundhouse Main Space; Kano Presents London Town; Ghetto; Maps

=== 28 October ===
Ray Davies and Friends; Duke Special; Ben Westbeech; Estelle; The Flaming Lips; Sam Isaac

== 2006 line-up ==
Paul Weller with Amy Winehouse and others; Guillemots; Kasabian; The Magic Numbers; Jamiroquai; The Young Knives; Klaxons; The Good, the Bad & the Queen; James Brown with the Sugababes, Max Beesley and the London Community Gospel Choir; Jamie T; The Raconteurs; The Horrors; The View; The Zutons; Jet; The Who; Spencer McGarry Season; Friends of the Bride; Genod Droog. Vashti Bunyan. Donovan both on the same set.

== See also ==
- The Proms
- List of music festivals in the United Kingdom
