= The World Is Still Here and So Are We =

Studio album by Mclusky
- Released: 9 May 2025
- Recorded: August 2023–October 2024
- Studio: Otterhead (Rugby)
- Length: 33:04
- Label: Ipecac
- Producers: Anthony Chapman; Mclusky

Mclusky chronology
Mcluskyism (2006)	The World Is Still Here and So Are We (2025)	I Sure Am Getting Sick of This Bowling Alley (2026)

Singles from The World is Still Here and So Are We
- 1. "Unpopular Parts of a Pig" / "The Digger You Deep" Released: September 14, 2023; 2. "Way of the Exploding Dickhead" Released: February 12, 2025; 3. "People Person" Released: March 12, 2025; 4. "Chekov's Guns" Released: April 9, 2025

The World Is Still Here and So Are We is the fourth studio album by British post-hardcore band Mclusky. It was released on 9 May 2025, by Ipecac Recordings.It follows a 20-year gap from their previous studio album, The Difference Between Me and You Is That I’m Not on Fire, and is their first since rebanding in 2015.

== Reception ==
Professional ratings
Aggregate scores
Source	Rating
Metacritic	82/100
Review scores
Source	Rating
AllMusic	4.5/5 stars
Blabbermouth	8/10 stars
Kerrang!	4/5 stars
The Line of Best Fit	8/10 stars
MusicOMH	4.5/5 stars
Pitchfork	7.5/10
Uncut	7/10 stars

On Metacritic, which assigns a weighted mean from 100, the album got a 82 out of 100, which indicates "universal acclaim" from 12 critic reviews.

Daniel Dylan Wray of Uncut rated the album seven out of ten, describing it as "noisy, riotous, guttural stuff – old-school noise rock toits core – that very much picks up where the band left off."

MusicOMH gave the album a rating of 4.5 and noted, "Scratchy guitar riffs and thunderous bass, all driven by pounding drums, suggest that the last 20 Mclusky-free years have just disappeared in a puff of smoke." AllMusic remarked, "A resounding return, The World Is Still Here and So Are We suggests the planet is that much better with Mclusky back on it." The Line of Best Fit assigned it a rating of eight out of ten, stating "The album not only justifies its existence but also adds something vital to the band's legacy. It's messy, lean, sharp, and relentless. Not cleaned up. Just tuned up and turned loose."

Kerrang! described the album as a "remarkably consistent collection after 21 years probably should be too, but somehow isn't, as mclusky always offered a safe – and strange – pair of hands," giving it a score of four out of five, while Blabbermouth noted, "The open-ended nature of it all creates a sense of mystique and makes "the world is still here and so are we" so damn compelling: it doesn't matter whether any of us can fully understand what's going on or what the point is when it sounds this good."

== Track listing ==
All tracks are written by Damien Sayell, Jack Egglestone, and Andrew Falkous.

The World Is Still Here and So Are We track listing
No.	Title	Length
1.	"Unpopular Parts of a Pig"	2:20
2.	"Cops and Coppers"	2:02
3.	"Way of the Exploding Dickhead"	2:48
4.	"The Battle of Los Angelsea"	1:55
5.	"People Person"	3:19
6.	"The Competent Horse Thief"	2:37
7.	"Kafka-Esque Novelist Franz Kafka"	2:00
8.	"The Digger You Deep"	2:52
9.	"Autofocus on the Prime Directive"	2:19
10.	"Not All Steeplejacks"	3:27
11.	"Chekhov's Guns"	2:41
12.	"Juan Party-System"	1:06
13.	"Hate the Polis"	3:38
Total length:		33:04

== Personnel ==
Credits adapted from the album's liner notes.

=== Mclusky ===
- Damien Sayell – production, bass, vocals, guitar on "Way of the Exploding Dickhead" and "Hate the Polis"
- Jack Egglestone – production, drums, vocals, percussion
- Andrew Falkous – production, guitar, vocals, bass on "Way of the Exploding Dickhead"

=== Additional contributors ===
- Anthony Chapman – production
- Ellis Powell-Bevan – engineering
- Bob Weston – mastering
- Ali Chant – additional vocal recording
- Steffan Pringle – additional vocal recording
- Michael Byzewski – art
- Damien Sayell – photography adapted for cover art
- Pablo A. Martínez – live photo

== Charts ==
Chart performance for The World Is Still Here and So Are We
Chart (2025)	Peak position
Scottish Albums (Official Charts)	15
UK Album Downloads (Official Charts)	14
UK Independent Albums (Official Charts)	5
UK Rock & Metal Albums (Official Charts)	5
