= Future of the Left =

Welsh rock band

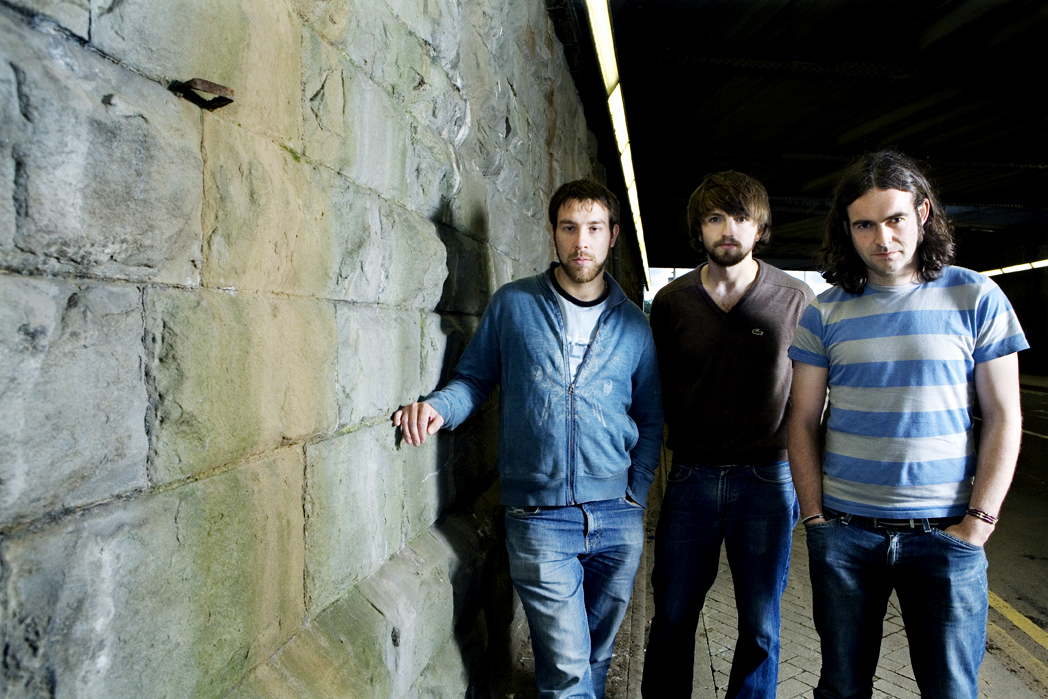
- Future of the Left in 2007

Background information
- Origin: Cardiff, Wales
- Genres: Alternative rock; noise rock; post-hardcore
- Years active: 2005–present
- Labels: Too Pure; 4AD; Xtra Mile; Prescriptions
- Spinoff of: Mclusky
- Members: Andrew Falkous; Jack Egglestone; Julia Ruzicka
- Past members: Kelson Mathias; Hywel Evans; Jimmy Watkins
- Website: futureoftheleft.net

Future of the Left are a British alternative rock band formed in Cardiff. The group consists of Mclusky members Andrew Falkous (vocals, guitar) and Jack Egglestone (drums) and former Million Dead bassist Julia Ruzicka.

== History ==
=== Beginnings ===
Future of the Left formed in mid-2005 after the bands Mclusky and Jarcrew both split up within two months of each other at the beginning of the year. The new group was formed by singer/guitarist Andy "Falco" Falkous and drummer Jack Egglestone, both previously of Mclusky, alongside singer/bassist Kelson Mathias and bassist Hywel Evans, both formerly of Jarcrew. Evans quickly moved on to start a math rock band, Truckers of Husk.

=== First performances ===
Future of the Left's first performances were secret gigs using aliases such as "Guerilla Press" and "Dead Redneck" to avoid the concert being attended by large numbers of expectant Mclusky and Jarcrew fans. Their very first show was at Clwb Ifor Bach, Cardiff on 2 July 2006, under the alias "the Mooks of Passim". The first official headline show (and the first show the band played under the name Future of the Left) was played in Camden Barfly to a capacity crowd on 1 September 2006.

In late 2006 the trio were signed to Too Pure, who had also signed Mclusky, and when Too Pure disbanded the band transferred to 4AD.

=== Singles ===
The band released their debut single, the double A-side "Fingers Become Thumbs"/"The Lord Hates A Coward" (along with B-side "The Fibre Provider") on 7-inch vinyl on 29 January 2007 in extremely limited quantities. A Too Pure newsletter sent out in March announced that the Future of the Left live set-closer "adeadenemyalwayssmellsgood..." would feature on a split single alongside Fierce Panda Records' Winnebago Deal on 10 May. However, Falco stated that it would only happen "over [his] dead body". The song was released as a 7-inch single on 4 June 2007, however it was not split with anyone; the B-side was a BBC Radio Wales session track entitled "March Of The Coupon Saints". On 10 September, the band released "Small Bones Small Bodies" as a single on 7" vinyl (with "The Big Wide O" and "I Need To Know How To Kill A Cat" as B-sides).

=== Debut album ===
Their debut album, Curses, was released on 24 September 2007 in the UK and 1 October in Japan. A surprise to some fans of Jarcrew and Mclusky was the band's occasional move towards songs with a synthesizer (a Roland Juno-60) in favour of Falco's guitar. On the whole, fans and critics responded to the change positively.

=== Travels With Myself and Another ===
Falkous revealed in an early 2008 online blog entry that work had commenced on the second album - new material began to creep into the band's live performances, including a number of songs that feature distinctively more ambitious use of Falkous' synthesizer. The band drew the attention of NME and was invited to perform on the NME Awards tour, supporting Les Savy Fav at London Astoria.

On 8 April 2008, their fourth single "Manchasm" was released (with album track "Suddenly It's A Folk Song" and new recording "Sum Of All Parts" as B-sides), receiving a single of the week recommendation from the NME. The band toured extensively during 2008, with sets occasionally including covers of Mclusky tracks. They appeared at the Reading and Leeds Festivals on the NME/BBC Radio 1 stage on Friday 22nd and Saturday 23 August. The band then toured in the United States with Against Me! and Ted Leo and the Pharmacists till the end of October 2008.

On 21 November 2008, Future Of The Left cancelled the remainder of their tour of the UK, China and Australia to concentrate on recording the new album. In a statement the band said,

We have been unable to write the second record and we are increasingly aware of the need to do so. We want to get it out before summer so we can spend next year playing it to people. It is against everything the band stands for to pull shows, or anything that we have already committed to doing, and we apologise to everyone who had bought a ticket or was going to come along. We will be back as soon as we can next year and we promise to make it worth the wait.

They released their second album Travels with Myself and Another on 22 June 2009. However, the album was leaked a month before onto the internet, singer Falkous mentioned his anger at this in a series of blogs. Regardless, the album received critical acclaim from reviewers, gaining 9/10 from Drowned in Sound and 8/10 from Pitchfork Media.

=== Personnel changes ===
On 7 May 2010, Kelson Mathias announced his departure from the band via a blog on the band's MySpace profile.

On the same day, in a separate blog, Andy Falkous announced that Steven Hodson (the bass player of Oceansize and Kong) would be filling in on bass for their upcoming shows, and also that the band had a "soon-to-revealed fourth member, whose main role(s) in the band are to play guitar and act like a fucking maniac". The band played summer dates around the UK and were also working on new material for a third album, playing a few new tracks at these dates.

Julia Ruzicka, ex-member and co-founder of Million Dead, made her live debut with the band on 17 September and confirmation of her permanent role was made via the band's Myspace blog on 21 October.

On 6 November 2010 Falco announced, via the band's Twitter feed, that they were in the studio recording new songs. In January 2011 in an interview with Undercover.fm he announced that the new album would be released in September.

=== The Plot Against Common Sense ===
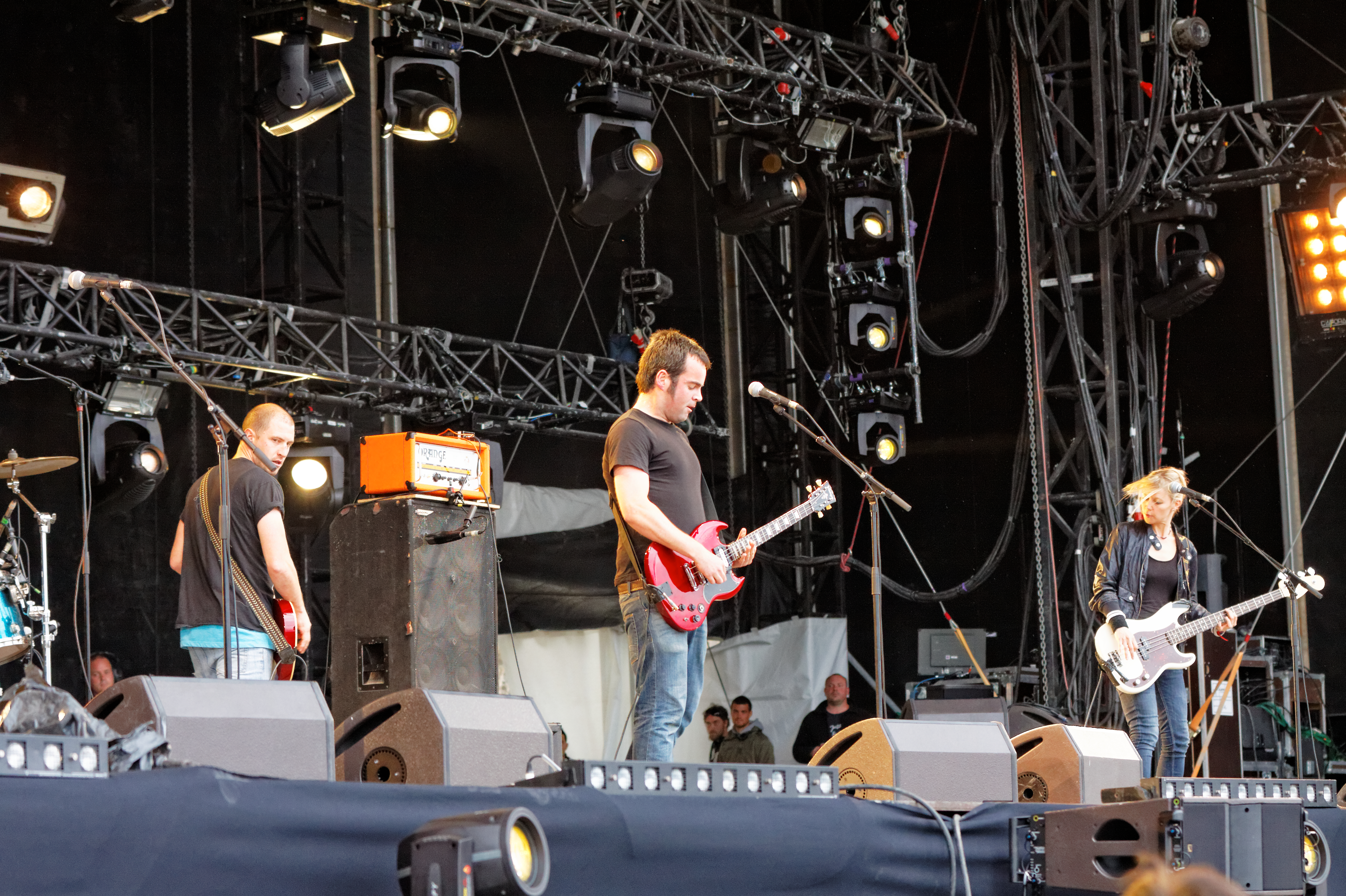
Future of the Left, 2012

In November 2011, the band released the six track EP Polymers Are Forever. Falco also announced via the band's blog that the new album had been completed, was entitled The Plot Against Common Sense and comprised fifteen tracks.

The album was released on 11 June 2012, preceded by single "Sheena is a T-Shirt Salesman" on 12 March. Videos were also released for the tracks "I Am The Least Of Your Problems" and "Failed Olympic Bid". The band released an EP of demos from the album sessions entitled Man vs. Melody in November 2012.

=== How To Stop Your Brain in an Accident ===
In May 2013 it was announced that Future of the Left would crowdfund their next album through the website PledgeMusic. The funding goal for the album was reached in just five hours and the band eventually raised over double the funding goal.

Pledgers were rewarded with a four track EP entitled Love Songs For Our Husbands released on 1 July 2013, through their own new label, Prescriptions Music. The full-length album entitled How to Stop Your Brain in an Accident was released for streaming on 21 October and was released in physical format on 28 October 2013. In addition, a sessions EP for the album was also announced, entitled Human Death.

=== The Peace and Truce of Future of the Left ===
In December 2015 Future of the Left announced they would once again crowdfund for their fifth studio album entitled The Peace & Truce of Future of the Left. The funding goal was reached within three hours.

Set for a release date of 25 March 2016 the band announced they would again record another sessions EP in addition to the new album and pledgers could also buy a special Fuzz Pedal specially created for the band. The album was released on 8 April 2016.

Guitar player/vocalist Jimmy Watkins was absent from the recording of the album and is no longer a member of Future of the Left.

== Members ==
Current

- Andy "Falco" Falkous – vocals, rhythm guitar, keyboards, bass (2005–present)
- Jack Egglestone – drums (2005–present)
- Julia Ruzicka – bass, vocals, keyboards (2010–present)

Former

- Kelson Mathias – bass, vocals, keyboards, guitar (2005–2010)
- Hywel Evans – guitar (2005)
- Jimmy Watkins – co-lyricist, lead guitar, vocals (2010–2015)

Touring musicians

- Steven Hodson – bass, vocals, keyboards (2010)
- Ian Catskilkin – guitar, vocals (2014, 2016)
- Damien 'Big Red' Sayell – Bass, vocals (2018-)

== Discography ==
=== Studio albums ===
- Curses (24 September 2007)
- Travels with Myself and Another (22 June 2009)
- The Plot Against Common Sense (11 June 2012)
- How to Stop Your Brain in an Accident (28 October 2013)
- The Peace & Truce of Future of the Left (8 April 2016) (UK no. 99)

=== EPs ===
- Polymers Are Forever (14 November 2011)
- At Magnetic West (21 April 2012)
- Man vs. Melody (November 2012)
- Love Songs for Our Husbands (July 2013)
- Human Death (2013)
- To Failed States and Forest Clearings (2016)

=== Live albums ===
- Last Night I Saved Her from Vampires (2009)
- Live at the Garage (2017)

=== Singles ===
- "Fingers Become Thumbs"/"The Lord Hates a Coward" (29 January 2007)
- "adeadenemyalwayssmellsgood" (4 June 2007)
- "Small Bones Small Bodies" (10 September 2007) No. 25 UK Indie
- "Manchasm" (8 April 2008)
- "The Hope That House Built" (16 March 2009)
- "Stand by Your Manatee"/"Preoccupation Therapy"
- "Sheena Is a T-Shirt Salesman" (12 March 2012)
- "The Limits of Battleships" (9 February 2016)

=== Music videos ===
- "adeadenemyalwayssmellsgood" (2007)
- "Manchasm" (2008)
- "The Hope That House Built" (2009)
- "Arming Eritrea" (2009)
- "Failed Olympic Bid" (2012)
- "Sheena Is a T-Shirt Salesman" (2012)
- "I Am the Least of Your Problems" (2012)
- "Things to Say to Friendly Policemen" (2013)
- "French Lessons" (2014)

=== Compilation appearances ===
- "Small Bones Small Bodies" on 2000 Trees – Cider Smiles Vol.1, Hide and Seek Records, June 2008
