= Last Night I Saved Her from Vampires =

Last Night I Saved Her From Vampires

Live album by Future of the Left
- Released: 26 January 2009
- Recorded: 13 August 2008; 20 August 2008
- Genre: Alternative rock
- Length: 63:04
- Label: 4AD

Future of the Left chronology
Curses (2007)	Last Night I Saved Her From Vampires (2009)	Travels with Myself and Another (2009)

Professional ratings
Review scores
Source	Rating
Time Out Sydney	5/5 stars

Last Night I Saved Her From Vampires is a live album by the Welsh band Future of the Left. It was recorded in Cardiff Clwb Ifor Bach and London Water Rats in August 2008. The album was initially available at live shows from late 2008 onwards, but was given a general release on CD and Download by 4AD on 2 February 2009.

== Track listing ==
1. "The Best Laid Plans"
2. "Wrigley Scott"
3. "Plague Of Onces"
4. "Fingers Become Thumbs"
5. "Drink Nike"
6. "Distant Jabs At A Soul"
7. "Manchasm"
8. "V.D.F.A"
9. "Dancing Etiquette"
10. "Fuck The Countryside Alliance"
11. "Olympic Ideals"
12. "Small Bones Small Bodies"
13. "The Lord Hates A Coward"
14. "London Shoes"
15. "My Gymnastic Past"
16. "Encores Explained"
17. "adeadenemyalwayssmellsgood"
18. "Auf Wiedersehen Goodbye"
19. "Cloak The Dagger"
