= The Difference Between Me and You Is That I'm Not on Fire =

Studio album by Mclusky
- Released: 17 May 2004
- Recorded: December 2003 – Early 2004
- Studio: Electrical Audio, Chicago
- Genre: Noise rock
- Length: 40:48
- Label: Too Pure

Mclusky chronology
| Mclusky Do Dallas (2002) | The Difference Between Me and You Is That I'm Not on Fire (2004) | Mcluskyism (2006) |

Singles from The Difference Between Me and You Is That I'm Not on Fire
- 1. "That Man Will Not Hang" Released: April 26, 2004; 2. "She Will Only Bring You Happiness" Released: September 6, 2004; 3. "Without MSG I Am Nothing" Released: cancelled

Professional ratings
Aggregate scores
| Source | Rating |
|---|---|
| Metacritic | 78/100 |
Review scores
| Source | Rating |
| AllMusic | 4/5 stars |
| Pitchfork | 7.2/10 |
| Spin | B+ |

The Difference Between Me and You Is that I'm Not on Fire is the third studio album from British rock band Mclusky. It was released to positive reviews by Too Pure in 2004. The two singles to be released from this album were "That Man Will Not Hang" and "She Will Only Bring You Happiness" ("1956 and All That" – albeit a different recording – had appeared as a double-A-side with the stand-alone single "There Ain't No Fool in Ferguson", released between The Difference... and Mclusky Do Dallas), though it was later revealed in the liner notes of Mcluskyism that "Without MSG I Am Nothing" had been intended for single release, but the band's implosion prevented this from happening.

== Track listing ==
(All songs: Falkous, Chapple, Egglestone, unless noted)

1. "Without MSG I Am Nothing" – 2:57 (Falkous, Chapple, Harding)
2. "That Man Will Not Hang" – 3:00
3. "She Will Only Bring You Happiness" – 3:27
4. "KKKitchens, What Were You Thinking?" – 1:50
5. "Your Children Are Waiting for You to Die" – 3:54
6. "Icarus Smicarus" – 1:51
7. "Slay!" – 2:54
8. "You Should Be Ashamed, Seamus" – 4:40
9. "Lucky Jim" – 2:02
10. "Forget About Him I'm Mint" – 1:46
11. "1956 and All That" – 2:24 (Falkous, Chapple, Harding)
12. "Falco vs. the Young Canoeist" – 2:12
13. "Support Systems" – 7:50
