= The Plot Against Common Sense =

Studio album by Future of the Left
- Released: 12 June 2012
- Studios: Faster Studios, Music Box
- Genres: Post-hardcore, noise rock
- Length: 49:55
- Label: Xtra Mile Recordings - XMR058CD

Future of the Left chronology
Travels with Myself and Another (2009)	The Plot Against Common Sense (2012)	How To Stop Your Brain In An Accident (2013)

Singles from The Plot Against Common Sense
- 1. "Sheena Is A T-Shirt Salesman"

Professional ratings
Aggregate scores
Source	Rating
Metacritic	81/100
Review scores
Source	Rating
AllMusic	4/5 stars
The A.V. Club	A−
Drowned in Sound	9/10
musicOMH	4.5/5 stars
NME	9/10
Pitchfork	6.0/10
Rock Sound	8/10
Sputnikmusic	4.5/5
This Is Fake DIY	9/10
Tiny Mix Tapes	4/5 stars

The Plot Against Common Sense is the third studio album by Future of the Left.

== Reception ==
Critical response to the album was positive, with a Metacritic score of 81/100 or "universal acclaim".

== Track listing ==
1. "Sheena Is A T-Shirt Salesman" - 2:08
2. "Failed Olympic Bid" - 3:14
3. "Beneath The Waves An Ocean" - 3:47
4. "Cosmo's Ladder" - 2:34
5. "City Of Exploded Children" - 4:10
6. "Goals In Slow Motion" - 3:11
7. "Camp Cappuccino" - 2:48
8. "Polymers Are Forever" - 4:07
9. "Robocop 4 - Fuck Off Robocop" - 2:53
10. "Sorry Dad, I Was Late For The Riots" - 3:08
11. "I Am The Least Of Your Problems" - 2:33
12. "A Guide To Men" - 3:54
13. "Anchor" - 3:12
14. "Rubber Animals" - 1:54
15. "Notes On Achieving Orbit" - 6:22 (including hidden track)

Running time: 49:55
