= Jets to Zurich =

- Origin: Aberdare, Wales
- Genres: Alternative rock, grunge
- Years active: 2009–present
- Label: Rickie Rocks Records
- Members: Dale Hawkins; James Carey; Shea Jones; Simon Hawkins
- Website: Jets to Zurich on Facebook

Jets to Zurich are a Welsh alternative rock band. They have been active since 2009. They have released three singles, three EPs and an album. They are currently unsigned in the United Kingdom but have a deal with Middle East based label Rickie Rocks Records for releases in that region.

== History ==
The band were formed by lifelong friends singer/guitarist Dale Hawkins and drummer Shea Jones in the autumn of 2008, and were originally a three piece with the addition of Dale's brother bassist Simon Hawkins. The band spent their first year playing locally in the South Wales area while they honed their craft and gathered material. Their first release was the self produced three track EP titled An Everyday Motion. With its low budget production and basic sound it was greeted with a mixed response upon its release in January 2009.

Over the next six months the band continued to gig extensively while writing what would become their first full-length release. In this time they supported bands such as Sucioperro, Exit International and Henry's Funeral Shoe. Their next release was a collection of demos released in June 2010, titled Atmospheric Sound Cycles. It was seen as a sign of further progression for the group and was greeted with a better response than previous releases. Generally it was seen as an improvement but still received criticism. In reviews on indie magazines like Cardiff's Miniature Music Press the feedback was mixed.

In mid-2010 the band recorded with producer Gethin Pearson on what would become the band's first two official singles, "Crimson Tide" and "The Downward Spiral". Both singles were released through indie label Catalyst Records to critical praise. It was during this time that the band began to enjoy unexpected success in the Middle Eastern country of Qatar, with debut single "Crimson Tide" peaking at number 4 on the QBS Alternative Rock Top 40 in December 2010.

At the start of 2011 the band became a four piece with the addition of guitarist James Carey. In June 2011 the band's second single "The Downward Spiral" became their first number one single in the Middle East on the QBS Chart. On the back of this the band received media attention from South Wales magazines and newspapers including the South Wales Echo.

Throughout the rest of the year the band worked on what would become their second album and supported bands like Johnny Foreigner, Lafaro, and My Red Cell. After the band parted ways with label Catalyst Records they released the single "Pyramids". On 20 February 2012 the song became the band's second number one in Qatar.

The band then released the single "Vertigo Red" via Tone Burn Records in the UK and Rickie Rocks Records in the Middle East. The single peaked at number 15 on the QBS Alternative Top 40.

=== Burning Sky and the Reflections of Time ===
On 22 October, shortly after supporting Nine Black Alps, the band released their double EP set Burning Sky and the Reflections of Time. Consisting of 12 tracks in total the double set was released via the Bandcamp site.

Following this the band played a few shows before releasing the compilation album Fierce Independent in April 2013. This was a collection of releases the band had made up to that point including singles and EP tracks.

== Discography ==
=== Albums ===
- Atmospheric Sound Cycles: Demo Collection (2010)
- Harmonics (2014)

=== Compilations ===
- Timelines (2017)

=== Singles and EPs ===
- An Everyday Motion, demo (2009), CD
- Jets to Zurich EP (2009), CD
- Crimson Tide (November 2010), Catalyst Records, digital download
- The Downward Spiral (January 2011), Catalyst Records, digital download
- Pyramids (13 August 2011), digital download
- Vertigo Red (March 2012), Tone Burn Records, CD and digital download
- Burning Sky and the Reflections of Time EP (22 October 2012), Tone Burn Records, digital download
- Delorean (November 2013), Tone Burn Records, CD and digital download
- Stanley Kubrick (July 2014), Tone Burn Records, digital download
- Before the Dawn (November 2014), Tone Burn Records, digital download
