= The Peace & Truce of Future of the Left =

Studio album by Future of the Left
- Released: 8 April 2016
- Recorded: Monnow Valley studios, Monmouth
- Genre: Noise rock, post-hardcore, alternative rock, math rock
- Length: 38:19
- Label: Prescriptions

Future of the Left chronology
How to Stop Your Brain in an Accident (2013)	The Peace & Truce of Future of the Left (2016)

Professional ratings
Review scores
Source	Rating
Drowned in Sound	9/10 stars
DIY	4/5 stars
Consequence	B
The Skinny	4/5 stars
The Irish Times	4/5 stars
The Music	3.5/5 stars
AllMusic	4/5 stars
musicOMH	4/5 stars

The Peace & Truce of Future of the Left is the fifth studio album by Future of the Left, released on 8 April 2016 on Prescriptions. Like previous release How to Stop Your Brain in an Accident the album was funded by fan donations via PledgeMusic, the target was reached within 4 hours. Future of the Left released the album to pledges by digital download on 24 March 2016. A bonus EP recorded at the same time as The Peace & Truce of Future of the Left was released in April 2016 titled To Failed States and Forest Clearings.

== Track listing ==
1. "If AT&T Drank Tea What Would BP Do?" - 3:21
2. "In a Former Life" - 2:58
3. "Running all over the Wicket" - 3:03
4. "Miner's Gruel" - 2:52
5. "Grass Parade" - 1:48
6. "The Limits of Battleships" - 3:30
7. "Back When I Was Brilliant" - 4:02
8. "Eating for None" - 2:26
9. "Reference Point Zero" - 2:29
10. "White Privilege Blues" - 2:38
11. "50 Days Before the Hun" - 2:51
12. "Proper Music" - 1:56
13. "No Son Will Ease their Solitude" - 4:20

== Charts ==
Chart (2016)	Peak position
UK Albums (OCC)	99
