= Travels with Myself and Another =

Studio album by Future of the Left
- Released: 22 June 2009
- Recorded: February–March 2009
- Genres: Post-hardcore, noise rock
- Length: 32:57
- Label: 4AD
- Producers: Richard Jackson; Future of the Left

Future of the Left chronology
Last Night I Saved Her from Vampires (2009)	Travels with Myself and Another (2009)	The Plot Against Common Sense (2012)

Singles from Travels with Myself and Another
- 1. "The Hope That House Built" Released: 16 March 2009

Travels with Myself and Another is the second studio album by Future of the Left.

== Background ==
Around summer 2008, the band started performing new tracks such as "Drink Nike" and "The Hope That House Built" at live shows. An additional 3 new songs ("VDFA," "Cloak the Dagger," and "Distant Jabs at a Soul," the last of which contains an instrumental section nearly identical to the ending of "Stand by Your Manatee") were captured on the live album Last Night I Saved Her from Vampires. In November 2008, the band cancelled the rest of their tour dates for the year in order to finish writing the second record. It was recorded at several sessions in studios in Wales and was released on 22 June 2009 on 4AD.

The track listing was confirmed by Andy Falkous on 27 March 2009, in a blog post on the band's MySpace page.

The album was leaked online on 22 April, eight weeks before its release date. Falkous, posting a blog on the subject, said: "I'm not angry (in fact I don't blame you, unless you leaked it, in which case I WILL KILL YOU), just a little worried that the record we made will get lost amongst the debris and leave us playing shows [...] - fifteen people and a world of disillusion."

On 18 May, a pre-ordering system was set up on the band's website which allowed an immediate download of the album, with the CD or LP being sent out closer to the June release date.

== Reception ==
Professional ratings
Review scores
Source	Rating
AllMusic	4/5 stars
Clash Music	(9/10)
Drowned in Sound	(9/10)
NME	(8/10)
Pitchfork Media	(8.0/10)
Planet Sound	(8/10)
PopMatters	(7/10)
SPIN	4/5 stars
The Fly	4.5/5 stars
Time Out (Sydney)	5/5 stars

The album was awarded a 9/10 score by Clash Music, with the review instructing the reader to "just buy a copy, and PLAY IT FUCKING LOUD." The NME also gave the album a positive review, awarding a rating of 8/10. Ben Patashnik writes: "Travels... feels like a product of 2009, a coruscating reaction to everything that makes us mad but which is never self-righteous or preachy." Andrew P Street of Time Out Sydney concluded "Let's draw a line in the sand right here, people: either this is your favourite album of this year, or you're just plain wrong."

== Track listing ==
1. "Arming Eritrea" - 2:57
2. "Chin Music" - 1:56
3. "The Hope That House Built" - 3:41
4. "Throwing Bricks at Trains" - 2:36
5. "I Am Civil Service" - 2:17
6. "Land of My Formers" - 2:47
7. "You Need Satan More Than He Needs You" - 2:46
8. "That Damned Fly" - 2:07
9. "Stand by Your Manatee" - 2:08
10. "Yin / Post-Yin" - 2:54
11. "Drink Nike" - 2:33
12. "Lapsed Catholics" - 4:15

== Accolades ==
Publication	Accolade	Recording	Year	Rank
Rock Sound	Albums Of The Year	-	2009	9th
The Guardian	Critic' Poll 2009	-	2009	17th
The Fly	The Top 50 Albums Of 2009	-	2009	10th
Pitchfork	100 Tracks Of 2009	Arming Eritrea	2009	97th
Pitchfork	Honourable Mentions	-	2009	-
NME	50 Best Albums Of 2009	-	2009	18th
NME	50 Best Tracks Of 2009	Arming Eritrea	2009	31st
Clash	Top 40 Albums Of 2009		2009	20th
Drowned In Sound	Top Albums Of 2009	-	2009	21st
AV Club	Top 25 Albums Of 2009	-	2009	14th
No Ripcord	Top 50 Albums Of 2009	-	2009	18th
Dandelion Radio	John Peel Festive 50	Arming Eritrea	2009	49th
Village Voice	Pazz & Jop Lists Albums		2009	67th
Village Voice	Pazz & Jop Lists Singles	Arming Eritrea	2009	224th

(*) designates unordered lists.
