= Mclusky =

Post-hardcore band

- Mclusky at 2000trees Festival in July 2022, (l-r) Falkous, Egglestone, Sayell

Background information
- Also known as: Best (1996–1999); 'mclusky' (2014–2015); mclusky* (2015–2020)
- Origin: Cardiff, Wales
- Genres: Post-hardcore, noise rock
- Years active: 1996–2005, 2014–present
- Labels: Too Pure, Ipecac
- Spinoffs: Future of the Left, Shooting At Unarmed Men, Poor People, Christian Fitness, Harmony, The St. Pierre Snake Invasion
- Members: Andrew Falkous; Jack Egglestone; Damien Sayell
- Past members: Geraint Bevan; Mat Harding; Jonathan Chapple; Julia Ruzicka

Mclusky (often stylized as mclusky), originally known as Best, are a British post-hardcore band formed in Cardiff in 1996. The group originally consisted of Andrew Falkous (vocals, guitar), originally from Newcastle upon Tyne, Geraint Bevan (bass) and Matthew Harding (drums); the latter two were replaced by Jonathan Chapple and Jack Egglestone in 1997 and late 2003 respectively. The band released three studio albums before splitting in 2005, reconvening in 2014 – without Chapple – under the monikers 'mclusky' and mclusky*, before ultimately dropping the asterisk.

== History ==
According to the band, they originally formed in 1996 when Falkous and Harding met at the Blackwood Miners Institute, a venue in their home town. The pair met Chapple a short time afterwards at the Reading Festival when they caught him urinating on their tent late in the night.

More realistically it has been suggested that Falkous and Harding met when working together at Anglian Windows, a small double-glazing call centre in Cardiff. They discussed their musical ambitions after a conversation about Reading Festival, Falkous gave Harding a tape of songs he had written on his own, and shortly after they formed a band called Best after early Beatles drummer Pete Best. The original bass player for Best was Geraint Bevan, Harding's old musical comrade from The Derelicts.

Best existed in this form for almost a year before Bevan left to concentrate on his acting career, but not before Best had played a show with a band called 'Myrtle', which featured the bass guitarist Jon Chapple.

Shortly after the departure of Bevan, the remaining two members managed to convince Chapple to join the band; this was based on the strength of the three track demo Best had recently finished at 'Ocean Studios' in Cardiff (this cassette – which was sold by the band themselves – was the unofficial debut, entitled the Benedict EP).

Best signed to London label Seriously Groovy and released their official debut record, the 3-track single "Huwuno".

The band changed its name to Mclusky in 1999, releasing their first album My Pain and Sadness is More Sad and Painful Than Yours in 2000 on the Fuzzbox imprint before drawing international attention with their critically praised second album Mclusky Do Dallas in 2002. In 2004 they released their third album The Difference Between Me and You Is That I'm Not on Fire to positive reviews.

They worked frequently with recording engineer Steve Albini.

=== Breakup ===
The band called it quits on 7 January 2005, with Falkous making the following announcement on the band's website three days later:

The three piece rock band known as mclusky have disbanded, as of Friday 7 January 2005. The reason for this parting is private, though probably not as entertaining as you'd imagine. Personally, I would like to thank all the people, places and times that occurred on or near us. I'm grateful for the love and to a lesser degree, the hate. There'll be more music soon, from all of us.

Little was said of the reasons behind Mclusky's split, but it later emerged that tensions had arisen between Falkous and Chapple. The root of these tensions can be traced back to an incident in 2004 when all of the band's equipment was stolen on the Arizona leg of their American tour (this equipment – worth over £5000 – was never recovered).

=== New bands and reunion ===
A compilation of the band's singles, Mcluskyism, came out in February 2006; a limited-edition version came with two additional CDs of B-sides (labelled as B-sides and C-sides), rarities and live recordings from their final headline performance at the University of London Union. (The band would make one further live appearance on 01/12/04 supporting Shellac at the Scala in London.) This compilation is, without doubt, the final chapter in Mclusky's nine-year saga, as Falkous informs in the Mcluskyism liner notes, "that's it, then. No farewell tour... no premature deaths (at time of writing), no live DVDs..."

The first Mclusky member to release material after the band's demise was Chapple, with his outfit Shooting at Unarmed Men – Chapple had dabbled with the band as a side project to Mclusky in the years prior, and wasted little time in making it his first priority after Mclusky disbanded. The band released two albums before Chapple emigrated to Australia in 2006. He has since revived the band in Australia with a new lineup, and released another album with the Australian lineup. Shooting at Unarmed Men disbanded shortly after the release of With The Youthful Energy of a Zealot. Chapple played drums with Melbourne band Poor People until 2012, and played bass and provided backing vocals for the six-piece outfit Harmony, which also featured Tom Lyngcoln of The Nation Blue.

After Falkous had conducted a handful of interviews discussing the then-fresh Mclusky breakup, he and Egglestone were not heard from publicly for a number of months. Almost immediately, rumours began to swell that the pair were collaborating with some members of also-defunct Cardiff noise-core act Jarcrew. (The project, which received no official title for eighteen months, was jokingly referred to as "Jarclusky.") The full extent of the collaboration was not known until Falkous created an unassuming MySpace page for the group under the name Future of the Left, complete with unpolished recordings of the band's first songs. The outfit have since incorporated members of now-defunct British punk rock act Million Dead, and have (after several years of resistance from Falkous) started including Mclusky tracks in their live sets.

In 2014, Falkous announced a benefit gig to help save venue Le Pub in Newport on November 8, 2014, with a lineup consisting of Jarcrew and a set of mclusky songs played by Falkous and Jack Egglestone, joined by Future of the Left bassist Julia Ruzicka and Damien Sayell, vocalist of Bristol band The St. Pierre Snake Invasion. This lineup has been referred to by Falco as 'mclusky' (with inverted commas) and announced a second concert at Clwb Ifor Bach on November 15, 2014 upon the quick sale of all tickets for the Newport event. Since, they have played another 'closing venue' benefit gig, in London at the soon-to-close Buffalo Bar. The following year, mclusky were announced alongside Future of the Left in the lineup of British music festival 2000trees.

Then known as Mclusky* (the asterisk in reference to missing members), the band reformed to play The Garage in London on 3 December 2015 to raise money for cancer research with Rat the Magnificent (featuring Ian Catskilkin of Art Brut). The band have continued to play since, with Sayell ultimately being brought in as bassist as well as a vocalist. In July 2020, Falkous announced plans to record a new Mclusky album. The asterisk was ultimately dropped, confirming the return to the official moniker.

In April 2022, the band announced a commemorative 20-year anniversary tour of Mclusky Do Dallas. This tour, along with the band's Australian dates, was later postponed to early 2024 due to a health issue for Falkous.

In September 2023, the band released a four-track EP – their first new music in 19 years – entitled "Unpopular Parts of a Pig". Its title track, as well as the second track "The Digger You Deep", were said at the time to be lifted from the band's fourth studio album. This was ultimately confirmed in February 2025, when the band formally announced the album, The World Is Still Here and So Are We. It was released on 9 May 2025 via Mike Patton's Ipecac Recordings. A new single, "Way of the Exploding Dickhead", was also released.

== Influences and legacy ==
Mclusky have cited influences including the Jesus Lizard, Shellac, the Jesus and Mary Chain, Fugazi, Hüsker Dü, the Pixies, Tricky, the Fall, Gang of Four, Talking Heads, Public Enemy, MF Doom, Lightning Bolt and Bill Callahan.

Publications have noted Mclusky's influence upon the instrumentals style, sprechgesang vocal delivery and satirical lyrics of Idles, Yard Act, Shame, Fontaines D.C., Wet Leg and Bully. Mowno noted them as a precursor of the crank wave genre.

Mclusky have been cited as an influence by Idles, Irk, Metz, Japandroids, Chat Pile, Jeff Rosenstock, Brick Mower and TRAAMS. They have been covered by Bully, Ditz, July Talk, Fight Like Apes and Punch Brothers. Gilla Band drummer Adam Faulkner stated in 2015 "For ages, for like a whole year, we got compared to Mclusky, and none of us ever listened to it. And then we all did and were just like, Nah, don’t like it."

== Members ==
Current line-up

- Andrew Falkous – vocals, guitar (1996–2005, 2014–present)
- Jack Egglestone – drums (2003–2005, 2014–present)
- Damien Sayell – vocals (2014–present), bass (2018–present)

Former members

- Geraint Bevan – bass (1996–1997)
- Matthew Harding – drums (1996–2003)
- John Chapple – bass, vocals (1997–2005)
- Julia Ruzicka – bass (2014–2018)

Timeline

== Discography ==
=== Studio albums ===
- My Pain and Sadness is More Sad and Painful Than Yours (Fuzzbox, 2000; r: Too Pure, 2003)
- Mclusky Do Dallas (Too Pure, 2002)
- The Difference Between Me and You Is That I'm Not on Fire (Too Pure, 2004)
- The World Is Still Here and So Are We (Ipecac Recordings, 2025)

=== Compilations ===
- Mcluskyism (Too Pure, 2006)

=== EPs ===
- Benedict (as Best) (Independent, 1997)
- Undress For Success (Australian Tour Edition) (Too Pure, 2003)
- Unpopular Parts of a Pig (Ipecac, 2023)
- I Sure Am Getting Sick of This Bowling Alley (Ipecac, 2026)

=== Live releases ===
- Gateway Band (2020)

=== Official single releases ===
- 1999 – "Huwuno" (as Best)
- 2000 – "Joy"
- 2000 – "Rice Is Nice"
- 2001 – "Whoyouknow"
- 2001 – "Lightsabre Cocksucking Blues"
- 2002 – "To Hell with Good Intentions"
- 2002 – "Alan Is a Cowboy Killer"
- 2003 – "There Ain't No Fool in Ferguson"/"1956 and All That"
- 2003 – "Undress for Success"
- 2004 – "That Man Will Not Hang"
- 2004 – "She Will Only Bring You Happiness"
- 2023 – "Unpopular Parts of a Pig"/"The Digger You Deep"
- 2025 – "Way of the Exploding Dickhead"

== Awards and nominations ==
=== Berlin Music Video Awards ===
The Berlin Music Video Awards is an international festival that promotes the art of music videos.

Year	Nominated work	Award	Result	Ref.
2025	"People Person"	Most Trashy	Nominated	
