= How to Stop Your Brain in an Accident =

Studio album by Future of the Left
- Released: 21 October 2013
- Recorded: Monnow Valley Studios, Monmouth
- Genre: Post-hardcore, noise rock
- Length: 44:58
- Label: Prescriptions

Future of the Left chronology
The Plot Against Common Sense (2012)	How to Stop Your Brain in an Accident (2013)	The Peace & Truce of Future of the Left (2016)

Professional ratings
Aggregate scores
Source	Rating
Metacritic	83/100
Review scores
Source	Rating
DIY	3/5 stars
Drowned in Sound	9/10
Financial Times	4/5 stars
MusicOMH	4.5/5 stars
NME	8/10
Pitchfork	7.4/10
The Skinny	5/5 stars

How to Stop Your Brain in an Accident is the fourth studio album by Future of the Left, released on 21 October 2013 on the band's own Prescriptions label. It was funded by fan donations via PledgeMusic, reaching its target less than six hours after release. Prior to the release of the album, the EP Love Songs for Our Husbands was released, with the lead track being "The Male Gaze".

== Track listing ==
1. "Bread, Cheese, Bow and Arrow" – 3:55
2. "Johnny Borrell Afterlife" – 2:18
3. "Future Child Embarrassment Matrix" – 3:46
4. "The Male Gaze" – 2:33
5. "Singing of the Bonesaws" – 4:42
6. "I Don't Know What You Ketamine" – 2:55
7. "French Lessons" – 3:18
8. "How to Spot a Record Company" – 4:38
9. "Donny of the Decks" – 2:41
10. "She Gets Passed Around at Parties" – 2:14
11. "Something Happened" – 3:51
12. "The Real Meaning of Christmas" – 2:30
13. "Things to Say to Friendly Policemen" – 1:42
14. "Why Aren't I Going To Hell?" – 4:55
