= Jarcrew =

- Origin: Ammanford, Wales
- Genres: Dance-punk
- Years active: 1999–2005, 2014–present
- Label: Gut Records
- Members: Kelson Mathias; Rich Williams; Tom Clark; Rhodri Thomas; Hywel Evans (2005, 2014-present); Ben Milner (1999-2004) (2014-present)
- Past members: Ben Milner (1999–2004)

Jarcrew was a five-piece dance-punk band from Ammanford, Wales. They were a relatively well known underground band (Jarcrew never enjoyed mainstream success) for approximately five years between 2000 and their early 2005 split. They played a bizarre mixture of electronica/house and prog-rock/punk/funk that baffled audiences up and down the UK (despite their somewhat unapproachable commercial nature they were offered some very lucrative support slots, including an elusive support for Scots rockers Biffy Clyro). Since disbanding, several Jarcrew off-shoots have emerged, most notably Future of the Left, a band that contained Jarcrew frontman Kelson alongside ex-mclusky members Andrew Falkous and Jack Egglestone. In 2014, the band reformed for a charity fundraiser and have since made a number of other appearances.

== Formation and commercial releases ==
Starting in a Welsh mining town, Jarcrew qualified for assistance under the Community Music Wales scheme (a system established to assist bands coming out of Wales, be it with monetary support or the release of a record to start a band off on the right track). In 2001, they released their first single, "Paris and The New Math" on Complete Control Music (Community Music Wales' record label, the same label that was responsible for the first People in Planes release back when they were known as Robots in the Sky) soon followed by the band's debut album Breakdance Euphoria Kids (a line from track 8 of Breakdance Euphoria Kids, "Money Shot") and the single "Capobaby". The album wound up in the hands of Gut Records who offered to remaster the recording (as it was deemed too acerbic and not radio friendly enough for general release). Only half the album was eventually remixed, with the original recordings being used for the rest of the album and single. The band agreed to this and with that, they were signed to a national label and were touring up and down the country, as well as providing radio sessions to the likes of BBC and XFM in London (the latter of which can still be found on the XFM website).

== Breakup ==
19 December 2004 saw the band's final show (with support from People in Planes in a small venue in Cardiff) and early 2005 saw the promise of a new album, which the band assured the world was completely written and ready to be recorded (which was evident from the amount of unfamiliar material the band threw into their set from as early as 2003, shortly after their first – and last – album was remixed and re-released by Gut Records). Hot on the heels of this news came the news that Jarcrew had disbanded. No official reason was cited; most commonly cited is that the band split due to Rhodri Thomas becoming a fully-fledged Jehovah's Witness.

== Other projects ==
While rumours of a forthcoming reformation persisted, Kelson (along with final Jarcrew bassist, Hywel "Ricardo" Evans) most notably assumed the bass duties in Future of the Left with former mclusky members Andrew 'Falco' Falkous and Jack Egglestone. Mathias vacated the position in 2010, and assumed the bass duties in Hywel "Ricardo" Evans' group, Truckers of Husk (along with two additional former Jarcrew members, Rich Williams and Rhod Thomas). In December 2010, Kelson and Hywel appeared on Bethan Elfyn's Radio 1 Introducing show to discuss the band, play a previously unheard demo from the unreleased second album ("Hello Monster"), and hinted at the possibility of a reunion. At a 2012 Truckers of Husk show in Cardiff's Clwb Ifor Bach, the one missing Jarcrew member (Tom Clark) joined the group onstage for a brief, unpublicised reunion (ending the show with two Jarcrew mainstays, Paris & The New Math and Sad French Death Metal). This was the first time Jarcrew have performed publicly in over seven years.

== Reformation ==
On 26 August 2014, Newport's Le Pub venue, which is facing closure, announced via Twitter that Jarcrew would be reforming for a one-off show supporting 'Mclusky' (mclusky's Andrew Falkous and Jack Egglestone, with Million Dead/Future of the Left bassist Julia Ruzicka filling in for original bassist Jon Chapple) on Saturday 8 November. All proceeds generated from ticket sales would go towards the £10,000 goal which would pay to soundproof the venue and keep it in business. Mclusky and Jarcrew performed again a week later in Cardiff's Clwb Ifor Bach, for the same cause. They have since performed sporadic one-off shows around Cardiff. In 2023, they released a new EP titled "Ghostie" on Bandcamp.

== Band members ==
At their commercial peak around about 2003, the band consisted of:

- Kelson Mathias – Vocals, keyboards/synthesizers
- Rhodri Thomas – Drums, vocals
- Rich Williams – Guitar
- Tom Clark – Guitar
- Ben Milner – Bass and vocals

However, in 2004 the band saw fit to part ways with Milner – not long before an impending tour (Williams and Clark split the bass duties and sometimes left the bass out completely). In the few shows the band did towards the end of their career, session musicians and bassists from other bands were employed. A man introduced as "Ricardo" – who, according to Kelson, did not speak a word of English but was "fluent in the language of rock" – was the band's bassist for their appearance at the 2004 Compass Point Festival in Cardiff (this later turned out to be Hywel Evans, who would remain Jarcrew's bass player up until their split in 2005, and later went on to form an instrumental rock band called Truckers of Husk – he was also credited as a songwriter on an early Future of the Left track, entitled "The Fibre Provider"). The band claim the split with Milner was amicable; Milner asserted at the time that he was ejected against his will (he did so publicly via the medium of several well-read e-zines, such as Jarcrew champions Drowned in Sound). Both Milner and Evans appeared onstage at the 2014 reunion shows, and the subsequent 2015 shows.

== Discography ==
- Paris and The New Math (single, 13 May 2002, Complete Control Music)
- Breakdance Euphoria Kids (album, 27 June 2002, Complete Control Music)
- Capobaby (single, 16 September 2002, Complete Control Music)
- Paris and The New Math (single, 20 October 2003, Gut Records)
- Jarcrew (album, 3 November 2003, Gut Records)
- Ghostie (EP, 20 January 2023)

The band also featured on a number of compilations, including the Fierce Panda Records compilation The Squirrel EP, which was released on CD and a set of 7" vinyl records. Also featured were fellow Welshmen Funeral for a Friend, plus Million Dead, The Copperpot Journals, Engerica and thisGIRL.

== Sources ==
- Complete Control Music
- official website
