= Spencer McGarry Season =

Musical project

- Origin: Cardiff, Wales
- Years active: November 2005 – present
- Label: Businessman Records
- Members: Spencer McGarry (vocals, piano, guitar), Avvon Chambers (drums), Rebecca Wood (vocals), Charlie Francis (bass), Dan McGinn (trumpet), Elizabeth Gibson (cello), Glenn Thompson (percussion), Katy Rowe (violin), Sophie Cochrane (vocals), Tina Hitchens (piccolo, concert flute, alto flute), Tom Jackson (saxophone, bass clarinet), Donal Whelan (saxophone), Simon Lewis (French horn), Stephen Black (clarinet, bass)
- Past members: Eifion Austin (bass)

Spencer McGarry Season is a project by songwriter Spencer McGarry (also known as Spencer Segelov) to record and perform six albums in half a dozen different styles. The project was borne from both a wealth of material and indecision over what musical direction to take. Spencer decided to present his songs in the familiar format of a television series/DVD box set with albums titled Episode(s) 1–6, which he believed would surmount the problem of many disparate ideas.

== Episode 1 ==
The first album grouped Spencer's simpler songs that took influence from a basic rock palette using only drums, bass and guitar and elementary arrangements. In late 2005, Spencer formed a three-piece rock band composed of drummer Avvon Chambers (who he had met in a previous band The Room Orchestra) and Stephen Black (aka Sweet Baboo), who he had met through the band JT MOuse. They self-released a single, "Leader of the Chain Gang", in May 2006, which led to the group playing the BBC's inaugural Electric Proms later that year and collaborating with the BBC's concert orchestral on new music (which would be used as rough recordings for Episode 2).

In 2007 the band appeared on the compilation This Town Ain't Big Enough For The 22 Of Us (Twisted by Design), which also featured Los Campesinos! and Sweet Baboo. Earlier that year Spencer, Black and friends formed the label Businessman Records, with the initial limited edition release of the vinyl-only "A Title Sparks Would Have Used" single in September. The band spent the next year touring and recording, producing a free download-only single "A Paler Shade of Wit" the following September, compared favourably by The Guardian to "…Television covering 'Like a Virgin'".

The self-produced debut album Episode 1 was released through Businessman Records at the end of 2008, with a national release in early 2009 along with the single "The Heat Was Hot". The song "The Unfilmable Life and Life of Terry Gilliam" from the album can be heard several times in the motion picture Colin.

== Episode 2 ==
Spencer began recording Episode 2 in January 2009 with producer Charlie Francis (High Llamas, R.E.M.). The album was said to be a mix of musicals, baroque pop and minimalist composition and features a 14-piece band of multi instrumentalists including additional singers Becky Wood and Sophie Cochrane and cellist Beth Gibson (who also played as the group Barefoot Dance of the Sea), along with violinist Katy Rowe (who also performs as part of the Mavron Quartet), Dan McGinn (trumpet), Tina Hitchens (flute) – who is a co-founder of modern classical ensemble Cardiff New Music Collective – Avvon Chambers (drums) and Stephen Black (bass). The album was released in early 2010.

Episode 2 has been received favourably by music journalists and critics. They have been featured as The Guardian's Band of the Day, and were cited as BBC Introducing's Tip of the Week.

Spencer contributed vocals to the Hot Puppies song "Dear Brutus" on the album Blue Hands and played drums on the Sweet Baboo album Hello Wave.

== Episode 3 and beyond ==
Episode 3 – A Quick Win was released in July 2012, again a collaboration with Stephen Black and Avvon Chambers, though no other musicians were involved this time around. The album was more pop oriented and synth-based than the previous two.

In 2014, the album Shorthand was released, credited to Spencer Segelov. It was a commissioned work from the Chapter Arts Centre in Cardiff.

Spencer is now lead singer of the band Instructions. He also serves as a musician in other bands, including Nathan Hall and the Sinister Locals.
