= My Pain and Sadness Is More Sad and Painful Than Yours =

My Pain and Sadness is More Sad and Painful Than Yours

Studio album by Mclusky
- Released: 2000, r. 2003
- Recorded: 1999–2000
- Genres: Noise rock; post-hardcore; punk rock
- Labels: Fuzzbox, r. Too Pure

Mclusky chronology
My Pain and Sadness is More Sad and Painful Than Yours (2000)	Mclusky Do Dallas (2002)

Singles from My Pain and Sadness is More Sad and Painful Than Yours
- 1. "Joy" Released: July 18, 2000; 2. "Rice is Nice" Released: September 4, 2000

Professional ratings
Review scores
Source	Rating
Allmusic	3/5 stars
NME	7/10 stars

My Pain and Sadness is More Sad and Painful Than Yours is the debut studio album by British rock band mclusky. It was initially released on Fuzzbox in 2000 and re-released by Too Pure in 2003. Andy Falkous is recorded as saying that the album started out as a collection of demos, which were later turned into album form. The album was predated by two singles, "Joy" and "Rice is Nice".

== Track listing ==
1. "Joy" – 1:11
2. "Friends Stoning Friends" – 4:21
3. "White Liberal on White Liberal Action" – 2:58
4. "Rice is Nice" – 1:06
5. "Fly Smoke" – 3:36
6. "Rock vs. Single Parents" – 3:07
7. "She Come in Pieces" – 1:52
8. "(Sometimes) I Have to Concentrate" – 2:56
9. "When They Come Tell Them No" – 1:16
10. "You Are My Sun" – 3:00
11. "Rods on Crutches" – 2:31
12. "Problems Posing as Solutions" – 3:49
13. "mi-o-mai" – 0:58
14. "Medium is the Message" – 2:50
15. "World Cup Drumming" – 3:13
  - "Evil Frankie" (hidden track) – 2:35

== Personnel ==
- Mat Harding – drums
- Andrew Falkous – guitar, vocals
- Jon Chapple – bass, vocals

All songs written by Falkous/Chapple/Harding.

- John and Ian – recording
- James Bernard – mastering
- Sleeve layout – Absolute Design
- Zincsplash – management

Production credits are oddly absent in the liner notes of the album.

== Charts ==
Chart performance for My Pain and Sadness Is More Sad and Painful Than Yours
Chart (2026)	Peak position
UK Independent Albums Breakers (Official Charts)	19
