= Mclusky Do Dallas =

Studio album by Mclusky
- Released: 1 April 2002
- Recorded: April–June 2001
- Studios: Electrical Audio (Chicago, Illinois); Famous
- Genres: Post-hardcore; noise rock
- Length: 36:00
- Label: Too Pure
- Producer: Steve Albini

Mclusky chronology
My Pain and Sadness Is More Sad and Painful Than Yours (2000)	Mclusky Do Dallas (2002)	The Difference Between Me and You Is That I'm Not on Fire (2004)

Singles from Mclusky Do Dallas
- 1. "Whoyouknow / Love Song For a Mexican" Released: 30 July 2001; 2. "Lightsabre Cocksucking Blues" Released: 12 November 2001; 3. "To Hell with Good Intentions" Released: 11 March 2002; 4. "Alan Is a Cowboy Killer" Released: 9 September 2002

Mclusky Do Dallas is the second studio album by British rock band Mclusky, released on 1 April 2002 by Too Pure.

Mclusky Do Dallas spawned four singles: "Lightsabre Cocksucking Blues", "Whoknowyou", "To Hell with Good Intentions", and "Alan Is a Cowboy Killer". The album was re-released on limited edition white marble and clear orange vinyl as a Record Store Day exclusive in 2012.

The album's title is a spin on the 1978 pornographic film Debbie Does Dallas.

== Reception ==
Professional ratings
Review scores
Source	Rating
AllMusic	4.5/5 stars
LAS Magazine	8.5/10
NME	7/10
NOW	3/5 stars
Pitchfork	8.4/10
Rock Hard	8.5/10
Spin	8/10
Stylus	D
Tiny Mix Tapes	4.5/5

The album received critical acclaim upon release. Tim DiGravina of AllMusic wrote that the album is "every bit as dynamic, thunderous, and accomplished as Relationship of Command, Come on Pilgrim, and Nevermind [...] The mad vocals of Andy Falkous make Black Francis look like a geeky school kid in comparison", ending the review by calling it "a fascinating, addictive album that never grows old, never takes itself too seriously, and never grates despite its absolutely raging dynamics." "At the end of the day, what separates Mclusky Do Dallas from all of the shit being passed off as punk or heavy rock is their sense of humor and their ability to not take themselves seriously" writes Jean-Pierre of Tiny Mix Tapes. Chris Dahlen of Pitchfork wrote that their "infectiously poppy songwriting [...] works to keep the mood varied" given that their "straight-up songs" are "wrack(ed) with nervous energy", calling it "one of the tightest, jumpiest, straight-up rock albums around."

== Legacy ==
=== Retrospective views ===
Retrospectively, the album is viewed very positively and is often considered the band's "breakthrough". JR Moores, writing for The Guardian, called it "the most gloriously sardonic collection of caustic-yet-catchy mini-anthems of its era" and bemoaned its lack of popularity upon release. Candice Eley of Treble called it a "masterpiece [...] an album as hardcore and as cheeky as its title might imply." Kyle Fowle of Spectrum Culture considers it to be "a monumental album. It may not be the most revolutionary revision of the punk rock aesthetic or vision, but it’s definitely the most fun. There’s a perfect balance present on the record; Mclusky is focused on creating a foreboding, harsh, loud record, but never once take themselves too seriously. The overdriven guitar solos and Falkous’ shriek hit you like a freight train, but are never alienating or unwanted. There's no overarching political or creative statement, just three guys beating the shit out of their instruments and having a blast doing it. You can't ask for much more from one of the definitive records of the 2000s." "No question about it," writes George Lang for NewsOK, "2002's “Mclusky Do Dallas” was the most hilarious record the Pixies never made, an album built from lacerating music and equally serrated wit that was custom-built for furious road trips and decibel therapy." Phoenix New Times ranked it third on their list of "10 Underrated Punk Albums That Should Be Considered Classics", with Tom Reardon writing: "Like the first two records on this list [Frankenchrist and Worlds Apart], this is a great record from a great band, but it has been largely ignored by way too many people. Sure, it's noisy and disrespectful to just about anyone with a shred of pop sensibility, but it also totally rocks."

=== Accolades ===
In addition to the ones listed below, the song "To Hell with Good Intentions" was ranked number 40 in BBC Radio DJ John Peel's Festive Fifty for 2002.

Publication	Country	Accolade	Rank
Pitchfork	US	Top 200 Albums of the 2000s	94
Cokemachineglow	Canada	Top 100 Albums of the 2000s	15
Beats Per Minute	US	The Top 100 Albums of the 2000s	66
The A.V. Club	US	The best music of the decade	48
NME	UK	The 500 Greatest Albums Of All Time	353
NME	UK	Top 100 Albums of the 2000s	82
eMusic	US	eMusic's 100 albums of the decade	74

=== Covers ===
The song "Lightsabre Cocksucking Blues" has been covered live by Bully and Fight Like Apes on their debut album Fight Like Apes and the Mystery of the Golden Medallion. The former also covered the track "No New Wave No Fun" live. Japandroids covered "To Hell with Good Intentions" live and on their EP All Lies (later compiled on No Singles).

=== In popular culture ===
"Lightsabre Cocksucking Blues" was included on the soundtrack to Observe and Report.

== Track listing ==
All tracks are written by Andy Falkous, Jonathan Chapple, and Matthew Harding, except where noted.

No.	Title	Writer(s)	Length
1.	"Lightsabre Cocksucking Blues"		1:51
2.	"No New Wave No Fun"		2:19
3.	"Collagen Rock"		2:52
4.	"What We've Learned"		1:54
5.	"Day of the Deadringers"		3:01
6.	"Dethink to Survive"		1:58
7.	"Fuck This Band"		3:38
8.	"To Hell with Good Intentions"		2:25
9.	"Clique Application Form"		1:53
10.	"The World Loves Us and Is Our Bitch"		2:23
11.	"Alan Is a Cowboy Killer"		4:09
12.	"Gareth Brown Says"		1:50
13.	"Chases"	Falkous; Chapple; Harding; Simon Alexander	1:47
14.	"Whoyouknow / Reviewing the Reviewers"		3:53

== Personnel ==
McLusky

- Andy Falkous – vocals, guitar
- Jonathan Chapple – bass, vocals
- Matthew Harding – drums

Additional personnel

- Steve Albini – recording, engineering (tracks 1–13)
- Victoria Collier – sleeve design
- Stefam de Batselier – photography
- Richard Jackson – recording (track 14, recorded at Famous in April 2001)
- Chris Ludd – mastering
