= Music of Newport =

Music of Newport, Wales
- Cerddoriaeth Casnewydd Cymru (Welsh)
- Nickname: The New Seattle
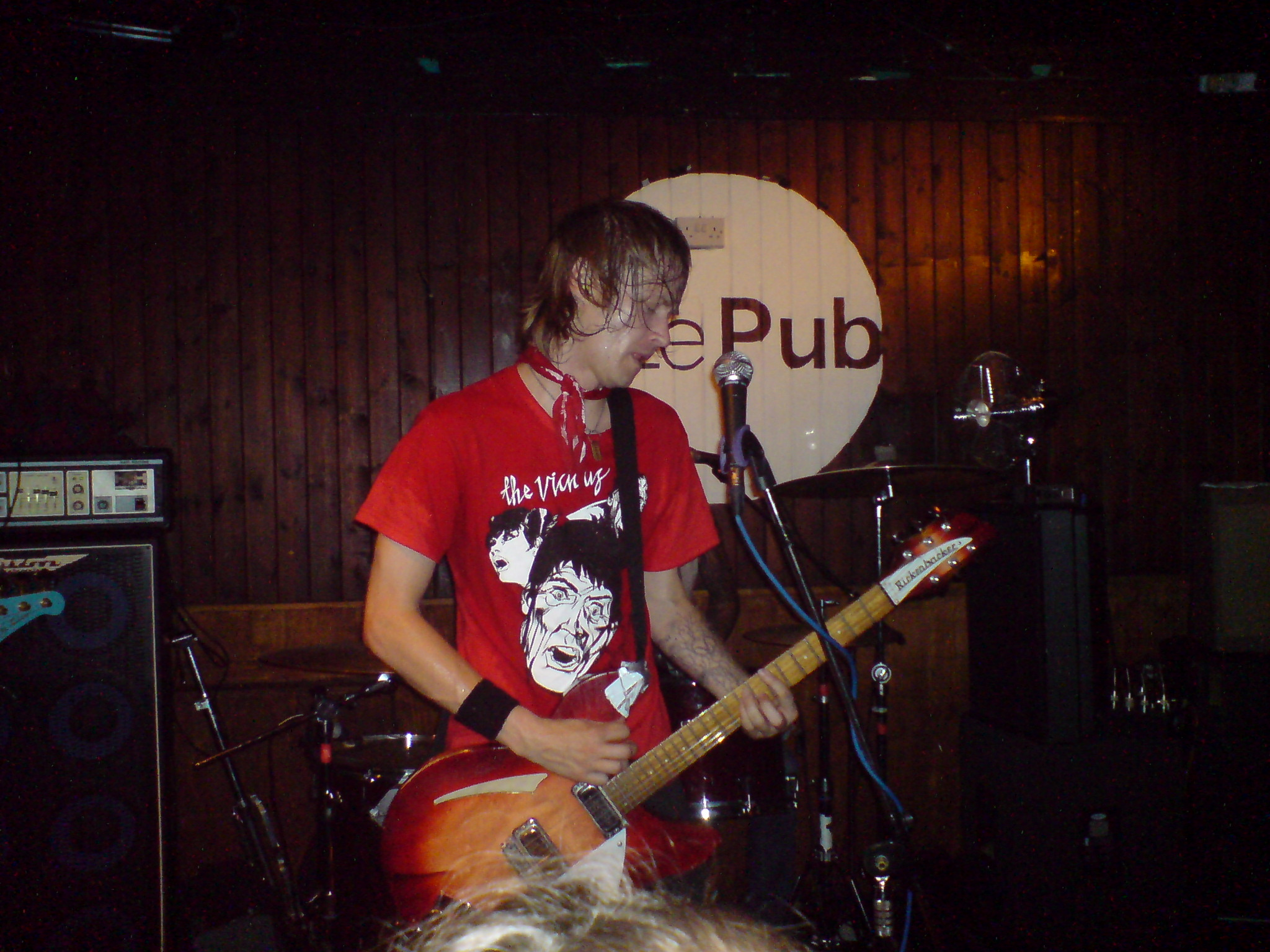
- Swedish musician Dennis Lyxzen, performing at Le Pub
- Location: Newport, Wales
- Events: Including Alternative, Grunge, Metal, rock, Hip hop

The Newport music scene, in and around Wales' third city, has been well documented and acclaimed for cultivating bands, singers, and famous music venues. Newport has been traditionally a rock city since the 1970s, but it has evolved over the years to include forms of punk, 1990s alt-rock, and more recently metal and hip-hop.

The city has long attracted a number of musicians to perform or begin their careers in South Wales. Those associated with the city include Joe Strummer of The Clash, Feeder, The Darling Buds, as well as Skindred, and Goldie Lookin Chain.

In 2001 FHM described TJ's as "one of the Top 50 best nights out in the world, ever." Newport is home to the UK's largest retailers of new LPs, Diverse Vinyl, which was established in 1988.

Newport became an alternative rock hotspot in the 1990s, when it was labelled as 'the new Seattle' and credited for bands such as 60 Ft. Dolls, Dub War, Novocaine and Flyscreen.

Manchester-based film maker Nathan Jennings announced in 2017 that a documentary was in the works about the city's musical past and present, entitled The Rock of Newport.

== History ==
Newport has had a noted role in the cultural scene of South Wales for many decades. Newport Art College, originally based in the Newport Technical Institute buildings and now part of the University of South Wales, attracted budding photographers, musicians and artists to the city from across the United Kingdom.

Newport Art College produced many later successes, but also drew a cultural scene to the city associated with its students and young people, such as Joe Strummer of The Clash in the 1970s. Groups linked to Strummer were established including RnB outfit The Vultures, The Gay Dogs, and later many punk groups such as Cowboy Killers.

The 1990s saw the rise of alternative rock and grunge in the United Kingdom. The now established Newport venues such as TJ's started to attract up-and-coming groups and artists, including many from the Sub Pop American label as they toured the UK.

The likes of Kurt Cobain and later Oasis either attended or performed in the city and groups such as 60 FT Dolls and Dub War were formed. The reputation was furthered when John Peel began to draw attention to the city's famed nightlife.

Newport currently has one radio station, Newport City Radio, which broadcasts online and previously over FM.

=== TJ's ===
TJ's opened in 1985 on Clarence Place and became famous rock venue on the 'toilet circuit' of UK independent venues. Described by John Peel as "The Legendary TJ's", the venue was voted one of the top 50 'Big Nights Out' in the world by FHM in December 1997.

Started by John (Johnny) Sicolo in 1971 with his wife Vivienne as a restaurant, he then expanded it with a neighbouring property to form the nightclub "El Sieco's", attracting local folk acts among others, becoming a popular local nightspot. It was then remodelled in 1985, renamed as TJ's, named after the initials of John and his late partner Trilby Tucker.

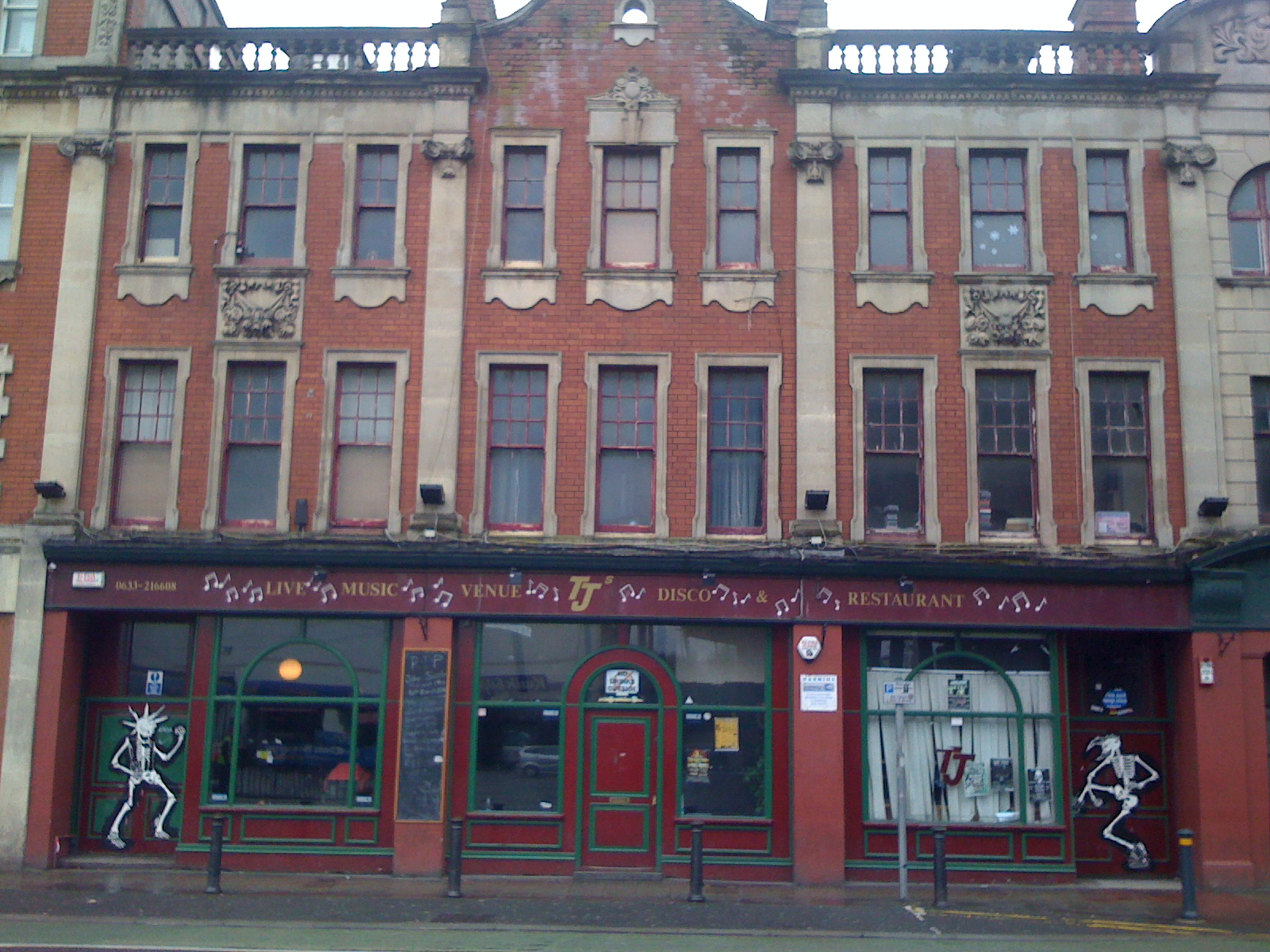
TJs Newport 2010

The venue came to UK wide fame in the music video for "Mulder and Scully" by Catatonia and for being the location where Kurt Cobain proposed to Courtney Love. The venue hosted bands early on in their careers, including Oasis, Manic Street Preachers, Green Day, The Offspring, Lostprophets, Iron Maiden, Sonic Youth, Half Man Half Biscuit, The Stone Roses, Muse, Primal Scream, Descendents, NOFX, Misfits, Mighty Mighty Bosstones, Lagwagon, The Bouncing Souls, The Vandals, The Ataris, and Skunk Anansie, as well as hosting the so-called "Cheap Sweaty Fun" nights regularly, hosting up-and-coming bands way before their spot in the limelight was made.

Sicolo died on 14 March 2010, aged just 66, and a tribute concert in his honour was headlined by Goldie Lookin Chain in the city's John Frost Square on 10 July 2010. On 15 September 2011, TJ's was sold at auction for £242,000.

On 2 February 2013, the building was damaged by a fire, suspected to be arson. The historic building remains empty in 2016.

In 2012, Sicolo's grandson, Ashley Sicolo, opened the 200 Club on Stow Hill, the decor for which included TJ's memorabilia and copies of TJ's gig posters. It went on to close in 2013 due to noise complaints, reopening named El Sieco's on High Street in Newport city centre.

=== The Smiths ===
Newport only received UK chart toppers The Smiths once. In 1986 lead singer Morrissey brought the band to the Newport Centre following the release of their widely applauded album The Queen is Dead, only to be mobbed by a throng of hooligans.

Writer Craig Austin described that "the delicate Stretford flower recuperated in the A&E department of the Royal Gwent Hospital (while the) frustrated audience responded to this perceived indignity by commencing the wholesale dismantling of the venue with undisguised rage. The band’s live sound engineer Grant Showbiz took to the stage to apologise on behalf of the band and promptly received a bottle in the face for his troubles.He was also taken to hospital, the police called, and six people eventually arrested. The Smiths were never to play either Newport or Wales again."

== Modern era ==
2000s Newport saw much upheaval, as the decline of the city's steelworks and docks became further ingrained. While the college and nightlife remained, venues such as TJ's were forced to close, facing mounting debts, noise complaints, and many other issues that plagued similar venues and cities across the UK.

During the period of Cool Britannia, groups like Manic Street Preachers, Feeder, and The Darling Buds formed the Welsh alternative movement popularly known as Cool Cymru.

Most iconic for the city was the surprise success of Goldie Lookin' Chain, a hip hop outfit of forty-somethings reputed for their humorous views on South Wales life.

Recent years have seen the particular revival of indie venues, with Le Pub moving to a new location on High Street, backed as a community co-operative and driven by the creative mind of owner Sam Dabb. TJ's was resurrected at El Siecco's but this didn't last long at all and closed after just a few months later. The old TJ's on Clarence Place remains derelict and is awaiting sale, having experienced many failed sales and arson attempts. McCann's Rock 'n' Ale Bar also opened nearby.

The reopening of Grade II listed art deco building The Neon, formerly the Odeon Newport cinema, has offered a much needed venue for the arts, music, and events, in particular urban and hip hop performances which until recently were underserved in the city centre.

The re-surge in vinyl sales has also proved a boon for the city, with the growth of Diverse Vinyl as the UK's largest source of new vinyl sales in the UK. Music studios have also opened widely, with up and coming bands facilitated at venues like One Louder Studios in Shaftesbury.

Idles lead singer Joe Talbot was born in Newport in 1984, and his father was a friend of Joe Strummer during his early Art College years before forming the Clash.

=== The Rock of Newport documentary ===
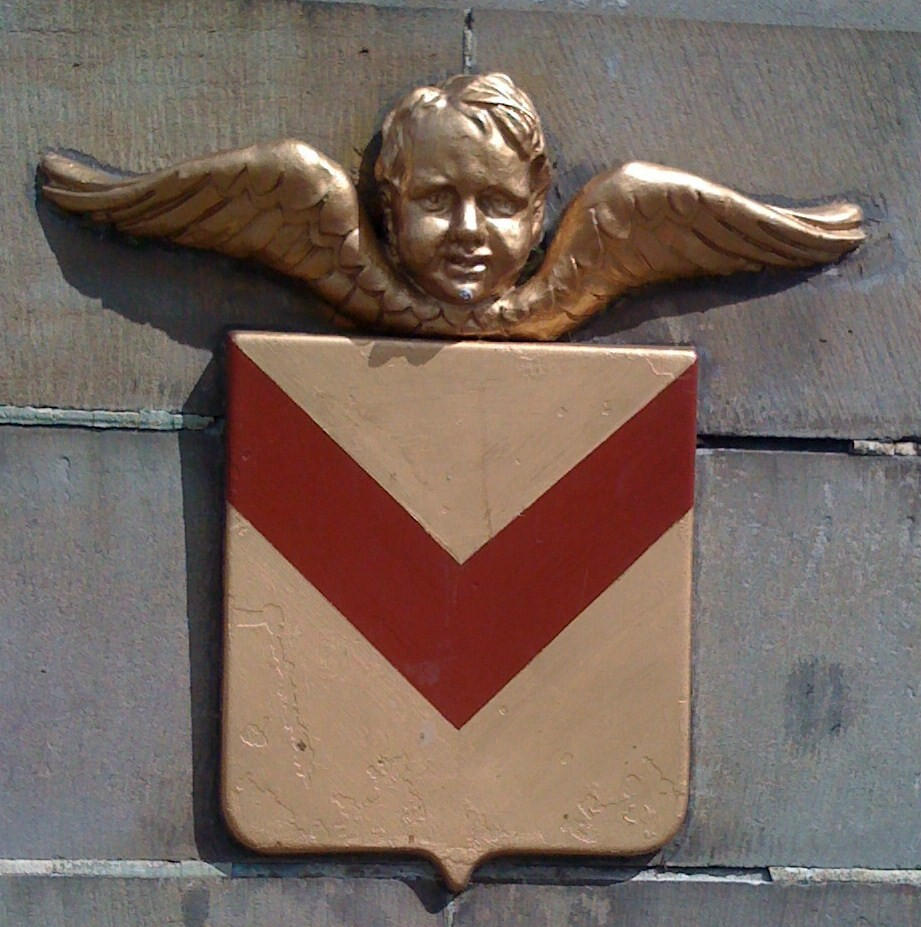
The cover to the Stone Roses' single Love Spreads features the city crest, seen adorning Newport Bridge

Nathan Jennings, a Newport-born but Manchester-based film-maker, confirmed in 2017 that a crowdfunding effort would begin to help launch a documentary about the city's music past. Covering topics ranging from the city's role in the production of the Stone Roses single, "Love Spreads", to the gigs hosted by "Bowie, Bad Brains or Blondie to the likes of Oasis, The Offspring and Ozzy", it will make a case for supporting the future of Newport music focussed on an 'actively supported grassroots'.

== Details ==
=== Music acts ===
Acts established or associated with the Newport music scene

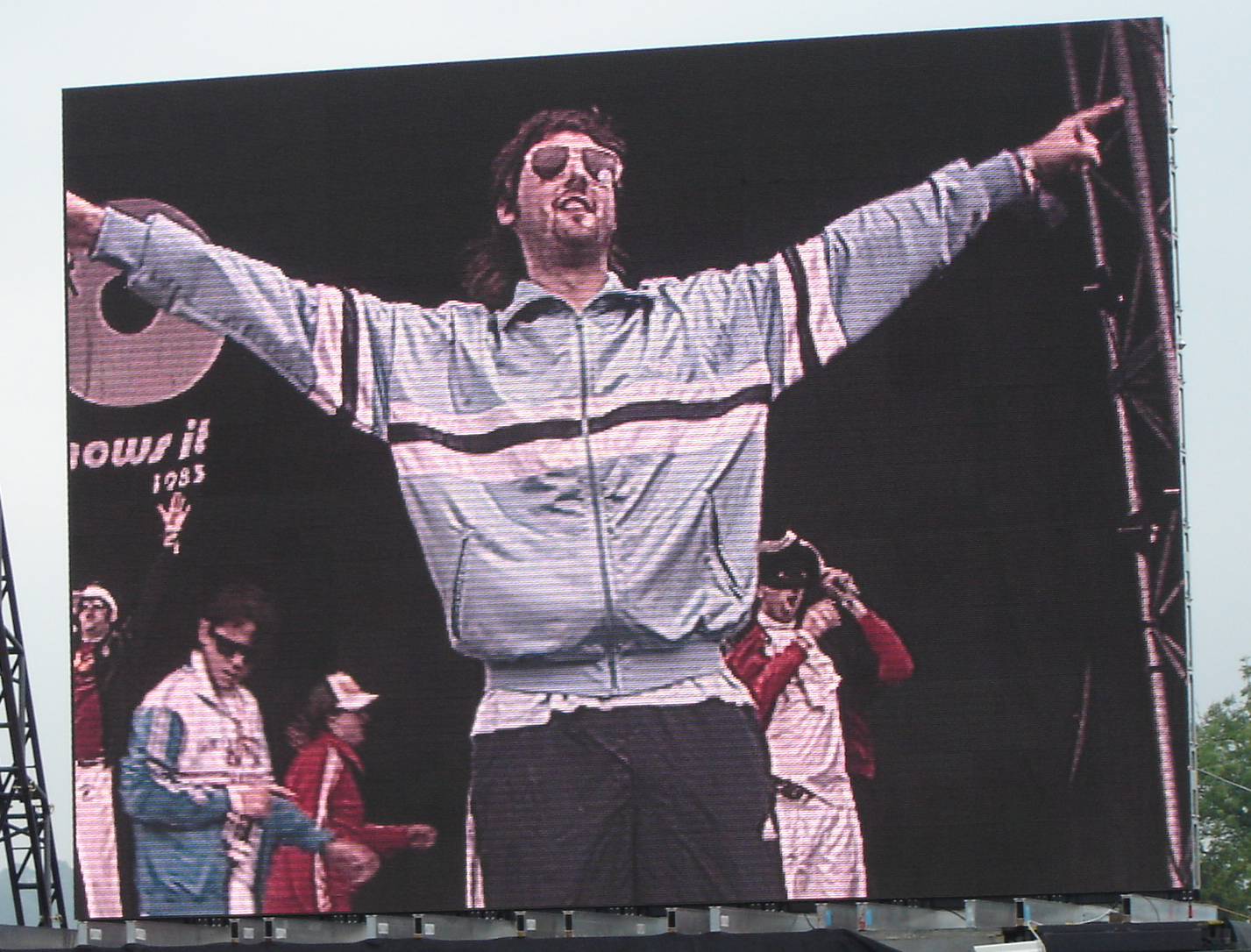
Goldie Lookin Chain

Groups

- High Contrast (studied in Newport)
- Goldie Lookin Chain
- Manic Street Preachers (recorded in Newport)
- The Darling Buds
- Feeder
- 60 Ft. Dolls
- Dub War
- Skindred
- Desecration
- Raindancer
- Terris
- The Vandals
- Chain of Flowers
- Novocaine
- Flyscreen
- Joe Kelly & The Royal Pharmacy
- Cowboy Killers
- Pizzatramp
- XY&O / Skip Curtis
- Jump the Underground

Solo artists

- Joe Talbot of Idles
- Donna Matthews of Elastica
- Grant Nicholas (singer)
- Nigel Pulsford of Bush
- Nick Evans (trombonist)
- Mai Jones
- Holly Holyoake (classical singer)
- Jon Langford (musician)
- Jon Lee (drummer)
- Jon Lilygreen (singer)
- Maggot (rapper)
- Mink-C (rapper)

=== Festivals ===
- Tredegar House Folk Festival
- Colour Clash
- Let's Rock Wales
- Portstock
- Caerleon Arts Festival

=== Radio stations ===
- Newport City Radio
- Gwent Radio
- Energize Media CIC

=== Venues ===
Indie venues

- Le Pub
- El Sieco's (new TJ's)
- McCann's Rock 'n' Ale Bar

Former

- TJ's (former)
- Stow Hill Labour Club

Arts

- Riverfront Arts Centre

Auditoriums

- Newport Centre
- Newport Market
- NEON

Pubs and bars

- Ye Olde Murenger House
- The Hanbury Arms
- The Carpenters Arms
- The Pod
- Tiny Rebel
- Pen & Wig
- The Potters
- The Dodger
- Riverside Tavern
- Bar Amber (Ivy Bush)
- Slipping Jimmy's

Nightclubs

- Atlantica Bar & Club
- The Courtyard
- Breeze

Chain venues

- Hogarths Newport
- The John Wallace Linton
- The Tom Toya Lewis
- The Queen's Hotel

=== Recording studios ===
- One Louder Studios, Albany Street
- Le Mons, Albany Trading Estate
- Record One, St Vincent Street
- Kane Audio
- Ty Du Recording Studio
- Pentastar Studios

=== Record labels ===
Current

- Junta Records
- Country Mile Records
- Diverse Records
- Madcap Records
- Kriminal Records
- Echo World Records
- Deep Meaningful Conversation
- Dirty Carrot Records
- Juncyard Indie

Former

- Cheap Sweaty Fun
- Words Of Warning Records
- Rockaway Records

== See also ==
- Newport, Wales
- TJ's
- Le Pub
- El Sieco's
- Riverfront Arts Centre
- Diverse Vinyl
- Toilet circuit
- Music of Cardiff
- Culture and recreation in Cardiff
- List of cultural venues in Cardiff
- Culture of Wales
- Music of Wales
