= Barnardtown =

District in Newport, Wales

- District
- City of Newport and (inset) within Wales
- Coordinates: 51°35′37.61″N 2°59′0.72″W
- Country: United Kingdom
- Province: Wales
- Preserved county: Gwent
- City: Newport

Barnardtown is a small area to the east of Newport Bridge in the city of Newport. It is roughly bounded by Duckpool Road, Church Road and Caerleon Road. It lies within the electoral ward of Saint Julian's and to the west is Riverside.

The original houses in the area were very slum-like tight rows with people living in appalling conditions. A local religious man Edward Barnard invested into building small new terraces. A condition of building the "new village" was that there were to be no pubs in the area and the names of the streets are that of church figures, e.g. Morden Road, Canon Street, Bishop Street.

Today the area features the Grade II listed The NEON building and Rodney Parade stadium, home of Newport County A.F.C., Newport RFC, and Dragons regional rugby union team. Redevelopment of Clarence Place has been underway with a number of historic buildings either being renovated, such as The NEON, or for sale, such as historic Newport music venue of the 1990s, TJ's.
