= El Sieco's =

Pub from Newport, Wales

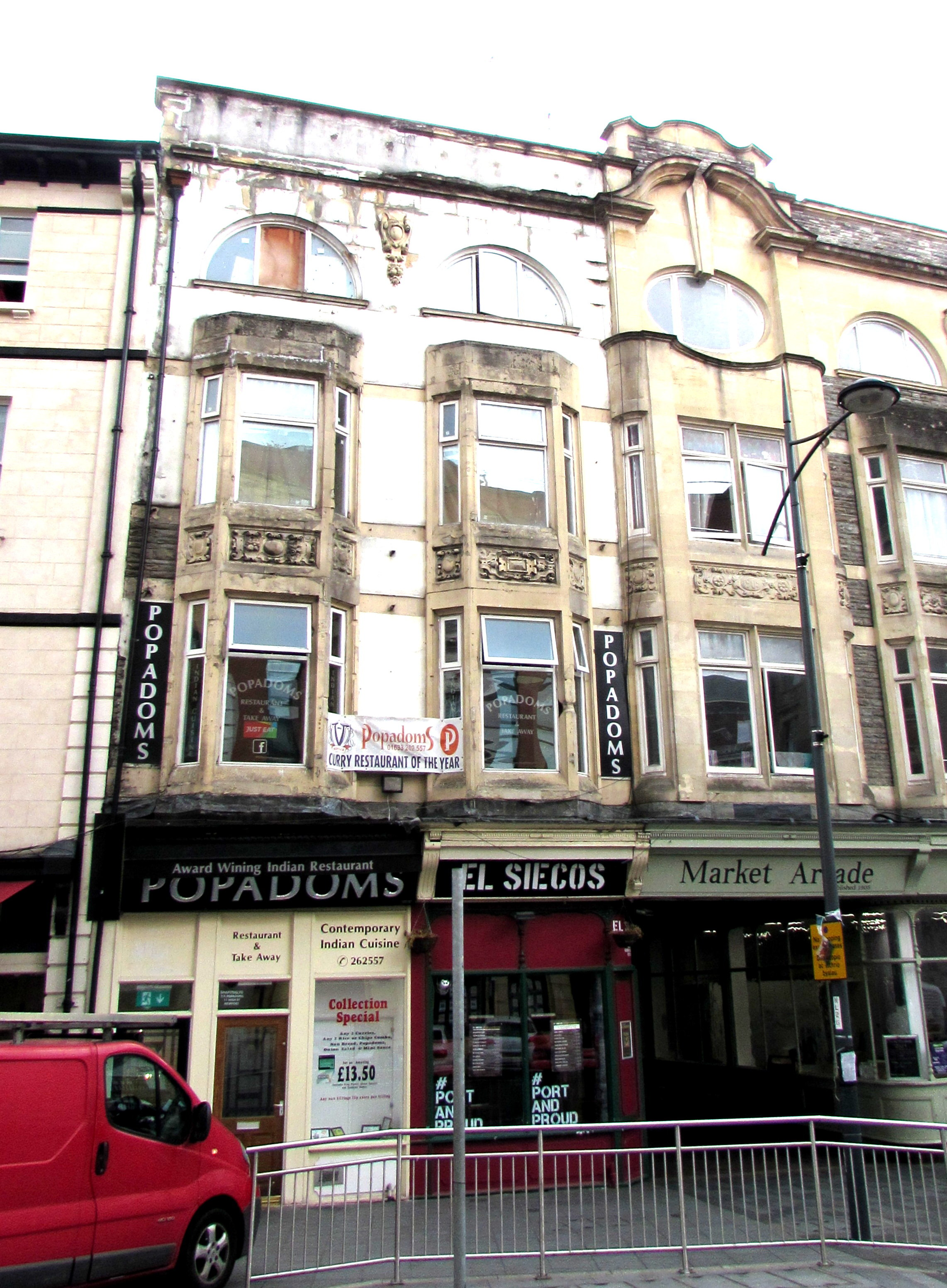
- The new El Sieco's, a successor to TJ's
- Interactive map of El Sieco's
- Former names: 100 Club
- Address: 10 High Street, NP20 1FQ
- Location: Newport, Wales
- Coordinates: 51.589492°N 2.997074°W
- Owner: Ashley Sicolo
- Seating type: Primarily standing, some seating
- Capacity: 100
- Type: Music venue and bar
- Events: Rock, punk and alt

Construction
- Opened: 2016
- Closed: 2020

El Sieco's was a pub, bar, and music venue in Newport, Wales which opened in 2016 on High Street, Newport. The venue closed in 2020 due to the COVID-19 pandemic lockdown.

El Seico's owner was Ashley Sicolo, grandson of John Sicolo. John was the owner of notable Newport music venue TJ's which was a major part of the Newport music scene until TJ's closure in 2010.

The new El Seico's venue proved popular, having been named in the South Wales Argus list of top 5 live music venues in Newport, and it was announced in 2019 that El Seico's would be moving to larger premises in Market Street. The new location was due to open in September 2019, offering an increased capacity of 350, two floors, with weekend evenings offering two rooms of music. In October 2020 Ashley announced that the club would not reopen, stating that "Coronavirus put life on hold. I’ve had some great times and met some great people, but it’s time for me to move on".

== Background ==
TJ's was a famous nightclub located on Clarence Place, which opened in 1985 and became an integral part of the so-called toilet circuit. The club, praised by John Peel, advertised itself as "The Legendary TJ's".

In 2010, TJ's owner John Sicolo died, reportedly having funded the club's upkeep in its poor quality building using much of his life savings. The original premises were held by administrators following his death, and later sold to the Hassan brothers of Cardiff.

In 2012 John Sicolo's grandson, Ashley Sicolo, opened a resurrected venue, first named the 200 Club, on Stow Hill, the decor for which included TJ's memorabilia and copies of TJ's gig posters. In May 2013 indie rockers took part in a gig at the venue when PiL guitarist Keith Levene and Therapy? singer Andy Cairns played there. The club closed on 26 May 2013 due to complaints over noise.

== See also ==
- Music of Newport
- Music of Wales
- Newport, Wales
- Newport city centre
- TJ's
- Diverse Vinyl
- Le Pub
