= Diverse Vinyl =

Record store in Newport, Wales

- Welsh: Cerddoriaeth Amrywiol
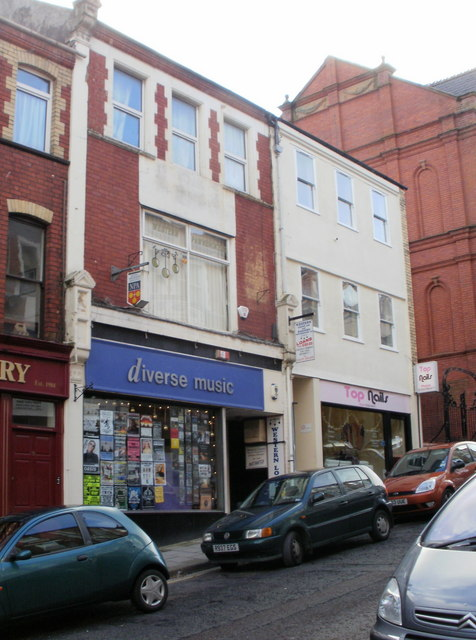
- Diverse Music, at 10 Charles Street, Newport
- Interactive map of Diverse Vinyl
- Address: 10 Charles Street, NP20 1JU
- Location: Newport, Wales
- Coordinates: 51.585600°N 2.995550°W
- Owner: John Richards (founder); Paul Hawkins; Matt Jarrett
- Seating type: Standing
- Type: Music venue, record store and label
- Event: Various

Construction
- Opened: 1988

Website
- www.diversevinyl.com

Diverse Vinyl is a record store and independent record label based in Newport, Wales. It is the UK's largest retailer of new vinyl records.

== History ==
It was established in 1995 by Paul Hawkins. Having opened as an LP mail order department, "a time when vinyl was in its darkest days". Hawkins has described being (at the time) one of the only South Wales record stores with a wide enough range of vinyl records, with only Spillers Records in Cardiff (the oldest surviving store in the world) serving for regional competition.

During the period, similar businesses including Rough Trade Records faced closure, with the growth of CD and later digital audio rendering vinyl recordings expensive and inefficient.

== Modern era ==
In 2002, the store started its independent record label, Diverse Records, which has gone on to release over 50 records, including the first vinyl printing of an Alison Krauss record, as well as popular bands including Idlewild and modern names like Laura Marling.

In recent years, the store has enjoyed a revival, along with the 2000s vinyl revival. The store and others has been particularly helped by the establishment of Record Store Day, which has brought attention, business, and events to local record stores across the UK.

In April 2019, the business re-launched its website, which has served as one of the largest online retailers of LPs.

The same month, for Record Store Day 2019 the store enjoyed queues of 80 people before opening, as people travelled from around the UK to the city. Music was performed both at the store as well as live venues across the city, from The Murenger, Tiny Rebel Urban Taphouse, Newport Market's Gallery Space, Le Public Space, McCann's Rock 'n' Ale Bar, and Slipping Jimmy's.

== Artists ==
Acts published by Diverse Records include:

- Adrian Sherwood
- Alison Krauss
- Amy Duncan
- Carrie Rodriguez
- Chuck Prophet
- Cowboy Junkies
- Daniel Lanois
- Danny and the Champions of the World
- Dolly Varden
- Eddi Reader
- Eleanor McEvoy
- Fionn Regan
- Georgia Ruth
- Gretchen Peters
- Heartworn Highways
- Idlewild
- Joan Baez
- Kris Drever
- Lau
- Laura Marling
- Loudon Wainwright III
- Mark Olson
- Paper Aeroplanes
- Polly Paulusma
- Richard Thompson
- Richmond Fontaine
- Rickie Lee Jones
- Roddy Woomble
- Ron Sexsmith
- Simone Felice
- The Boo Radleys
- The Webb Sisters
- The Duke & The King
- Dr John & The Lower 911
- Frank Black & The Catholics

== See also ==
- Music of Newport
- Music of Wales
- Newport, Wales
- Welsh music
- Newport city centre
- TJ's
- El Sieco's
- Le Pub
- Weeping Angels
