= The Charlotte =

Pub and concert venue in Leicester, England

Coordinates: 52.631905°N 1.137703°W

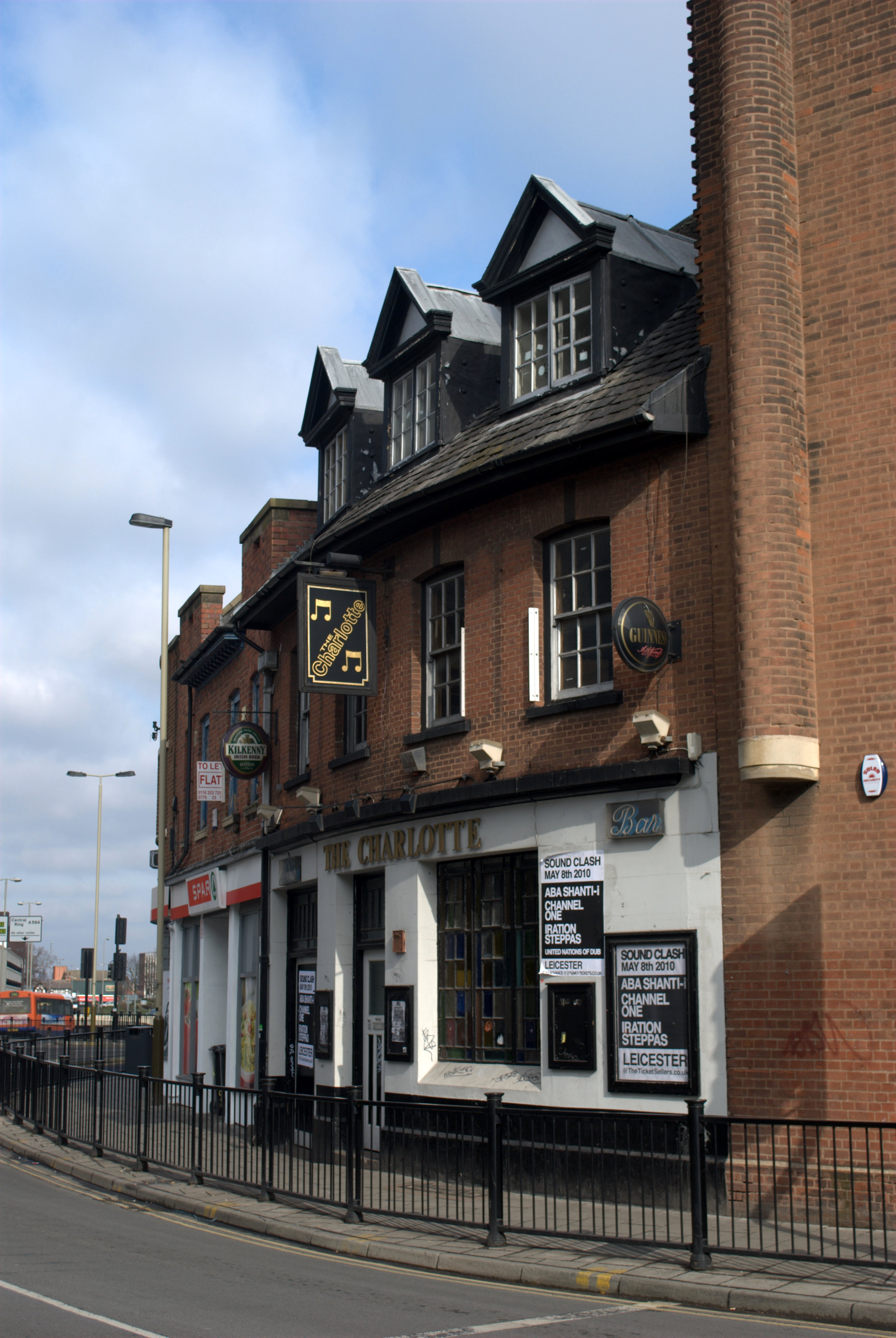
The Charlotte

The Charlotte was a pub and concert venue in Leicester, England, on the edge of the city centre, on Oxford Street, opposite De Montfort University. It was a nationally recognised music venue on the UK's 'toilet circuit', hosting bands such as Blur, Oasis, Coldplay, Radiohead, the Arctic Monkeys and Kasabian before they found widespread acclaim. The first ever live performance of Creep, which became an international hit for Radiohead, was at the Charlotte.

== Early history ==
The pub was originally named the Princess Charlotte, in honour of the daughter of George IV. The earliest known record of the pub dates back to 1815. Princess Charlotte herself died two years later.

In 1853, landlord Moses Wilby was convicted of an assault on a customer. Henry Finley had been quarrelling with his wife in the pub, and when Wilby asked them to leave, Finley "struck him under the ear". Wilby then knocked him down. He was fined 10s or 14 days imprisonment.

William and Sarah Kellam took the pub from Wilby in 1857, and a year later William was fined for serving after hours. In defence, he had claimed he had fallen asleep and hadn't realised the time. Sarah Kellam died after a botched backstreet abortion in 1860. On her death bed, she accused Elizabeth Goddard, who was convicted of murder and sentenced to death. But a partial pardon, signed by Queen Victoria, commuted the sentence to a life of penal servitude.

In 1976, the pub featured in an edition of the ITV current affairs programme This Week on alleged infiltration of Territorial Army units by the National Front. A clip was shown of the pub, saying a local NF group met there. But the then-licensee told the Leicester Mercury the group had been barred from the pub.

== Birth of the music venue ==
The Princess Charlotte began hosting live music in the late 1970s, when it was home to the Leicester Traditional Music Club. Gary Warren took over as landlord in 1985 and started putting on regular gigs, though he told the Mercury he was having trouble finding local bands to support touring groups.

In 1985, Leicester City players Gary McAllister, Ali Mauchlen, Ian Andrews and Simon Morgan, Paddy Clift and Ian Butcher from Leicestershire County Cricket Club and a number of Leicester Tigers players joined Leicester Polytechnic students in a bid to drink the pub dry in a single day for charity. Warren had ordered 4,500 pints from brewery Ind Coope.

Andy Wright, who became synonymous with both the pub and Leicester's music scene, took over from Warren in 1988 and cemented the reputation of the Charlotte as a circuit pub.

In 1998, the pub closed for extensive refurbishment. The back bar of the pub was absorbed into an expanded venue, and it reopened that October with a gig by 3 Colours Red, with capacity doubled to 400. The following year, the pub dropped the word Princess from its name.

== Performances ==
Notable bands to appear at the Princess Charlotte included The Killers, The Stone Roses, Robert Plant, Joe Strummer, The Cranberries, The Proclaimers, Jayne County & The Electric Chairs, The La's, Spiritualized, Frank Black, Bloc Party, The Arctic Monkeys, Demented are Go, Kingmaker, The Libertines, The Offspring, Razorlight, The Buzzcocks, Primal Scream, Muse, Biffy Clyro, Carter USM, Elastica, Supergrass, SUGAR and Foals.

Oasis played the Charlotte in May 1994, a few weeks after the release of their debut single, Supersonic. Noel Gallagher later told Mojo magazine it was his second favourite gig of his career. Entry cost £3 for concessions, and the band received a fee of £50.

Blur appeared twice, in July and October 1990. Footage from the July gig features in the band's 2004 Starshaped tour film. At the second gig singer Damon Albarn climbed the PA stack and knocked a speaker, which hit a member of the audience. "It looked nasty and I feared the worst," Wright later recalled. "I thought she might sue us - and them. I patched her up and she said 'If you get me a T-shirt and I can have a kiss from Damon, then we'll leave it there.' So I did. And she went home."

Radiohead played at the Charlotte three times, in 1992 and 1993, and performed Creep for the first time at the venue - to an audience of seven people, according to bassist Colin Greenwood. In 1990, Pulp played at the venue to a handful of people. "They were awful. When they made it, I just couldn't shake the memory of how bad they'd been here." The Manic Street Preachers played for no fee. "They cancelled on us twice, so they came back and played for free," Wright told the Leicester Mercury in 2004.

Coldplay appeared at the Charlotte in 1999 and 2000, the second time receiving £30 petrol money for the journey from London. At a Wembley Stadium gig in August 2025, singer Chris Martin introduced the 90,000 strong crowd to Leicester man Thom Costall, "our first ever actual fan in the world”. With Costall appearing on the giant screen at Wembley, Martin said: “I’ll tell you the story briefly. Outside of a venue called The Leicester Charlotte in 1998 or nine, there was a 15-year-old boy and he approached Jonny, our guitarist, and said ‘I learned how to play your song on guitar’." After telling the crowd the story makes him cry, Martin thanked Thom for his dedicated support, saying: “Thom, we want to say thank you for making all of this happen really, and for giving us belief in ourselves."

The Charlotte also acted as a seedbed for Leicester and Leicestershire bands, offering support slots for touring groups or simply to play on a bill of local groups. The Charlotte was a springboard for Leicester bands including Kasabian, Crazyhead, Gaye Bykers on Acid, Cornershop, Prolapse, the Hunters Club, Huge Big Massive, Blab Happy, Perfume, The Screening and The Displacements.

In 1995, the Charlotte launched a joint promotion with the Leicester Mercury called the Mercury/Charlotte Showcase, also known as the New Talent Night. Tickets were just £1, with a voucher from the newspaper, which printed a review of the gig the following day. Acts who played the Showcase included Muse in 1999 and Saracuse (later Kasabian) in 1999 and 2000.

== Closure ==
On 15 January 2009, it was announced the Charlotte was facing closure, after the operating company behind the venue went into administration. On 10 March 2009 it was announced that the Charlotte would remain closed for the foreseeable future, however it reopened on 8 October 2009. It was subsequently announced that the last night would be on 13 March 2010 and that the site would be developed into student flats.

On 11 April 2014, the Charlotte re-opened briefly as a pub hosting occasional live music sessions. It closed again just a few months later. In August 2015, it was announced that the Charlotte was being taken on by two real ale pub landlords from Leicester. The Charlotte opened as an independent real ale pub on 19 October 2015, but closed again in February 2017, and the building became a supermarket. The pub's sign remains outside.

Andy Wright died in 2022, triggering an outpouring of tributes from bands and gig-goers. His funeral cortege stopped outside the Charlotte, the venue where he had spent some of the most "awesome" days of his life.
