= Hanbury Arms =

Pub in Caerleon, Newport, Wales

- Grade II listed public house
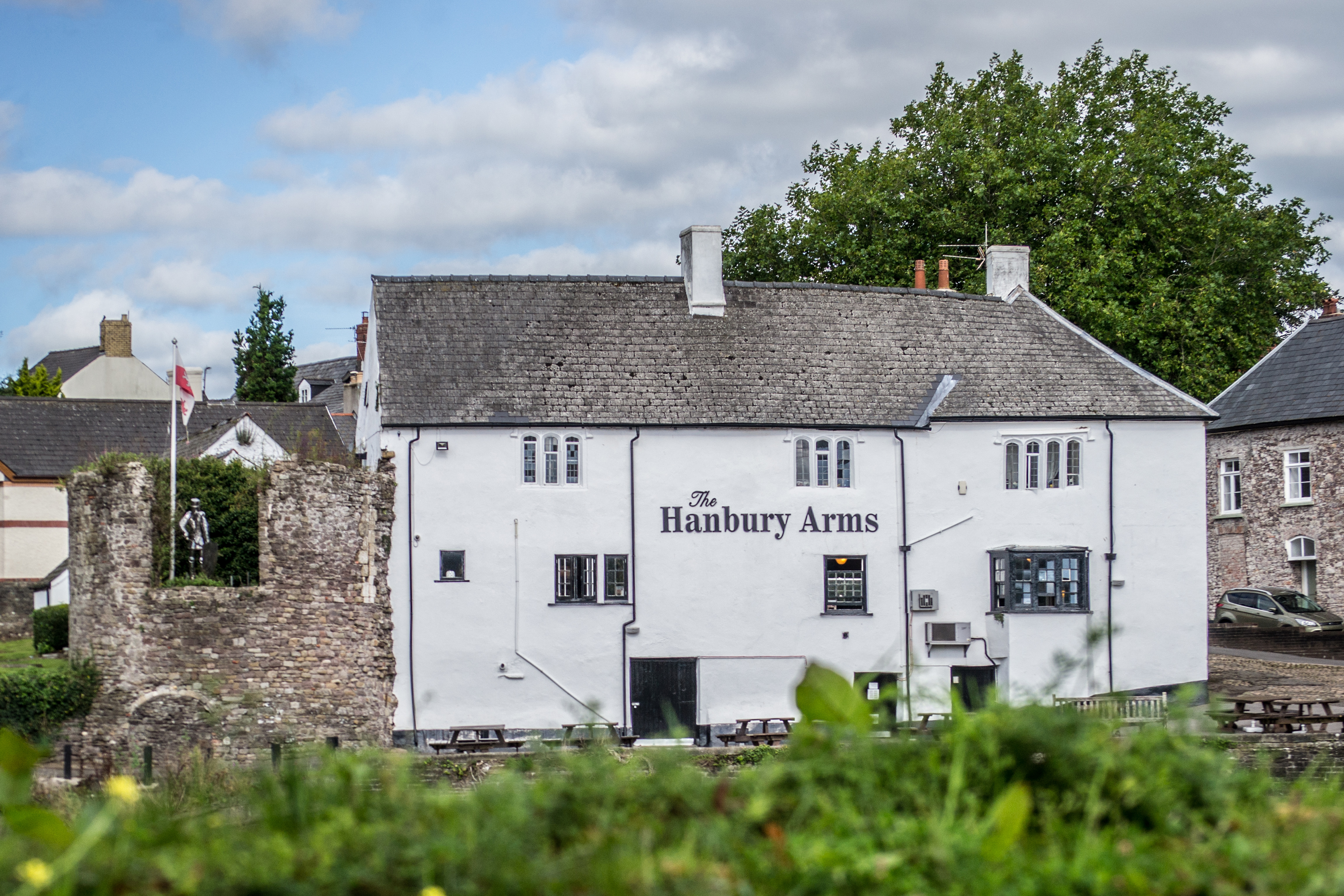
- The Hanbury Arms with the Norman tower (c. 1219) visible at the left, adjoining the main building

- Location within Newport

General information
- Architectural style: Norman (tower); Tudor (building); Roman (slipway foundations)
- Location: Caerleon, Newport, Wales
- Coordinates: 51.608459°N 2.951936°W
- Completed: Tower: 1219; Coach House: 1565

The Hanbury Arms is a public house in Caerleon, near Newport, Wales. In the 19th century, Alfred, Lord Tennyson stayed at the inn, and began writing the Idylls of the King during his stay.

== Description ==
The Hanbury Arms has survived many renovations and the building's thick stone walls and stone fireplace remain intact. The roof is of local Welsh slate. The windows were reformed in the 19th century and the interior remains in its Tudor style. The pub is formed from local rubble stone with a lime-wash. It is a Grade II listed building. The adjoining tower is listed at Grade II*.

== History ==
Caerleon has its origins as an Iron Age Silures hill fort. Upon the arrival of the Roman outposts across Britain, including at nearby Caerwent, the Isca Augusta fortress at Caerleon developed on the River Usk as an important route for goods and men into the country. The River Usk served both as the port of Newport and as a medieval port of Caerleon, situated four miles upriver.

The first known construction on the site is a Norman tower built around 1219. Two theories exist explaining the uncertain history of the tower. One suggests that the tower was twinned with another tower on the opposite bank of the River Usk. Together they served as a chain tower allowing access to the upper river. An alternative theory suggests it formed part of the outer bailey of the castle.

In the 1600s, Caerleon's quay grew, similar to the earlier established Roman docks that are now buried, and the Hanbury Arms was established on the riverside.

The Hanbury Arms was initially a townhouse for the wealthy Morgan family, known as Tŷ Glyndŵr. The oldest parts of the building date back to 1219. It is listed both as a building, and a scheduled Ancient Monument in the region of Caerleon. The building dates to 1565 and was later used in the 17th century as a Magistrate's Court. At that time the tower was thought to be of Roman origin and was used to house criminals.

The Hanbury family became the owners of the building in the 1720s. It became a pub around the 1750s and adopted the Hanbury family's coat of arms. In the 19th and early 20th centuries, the pub brewed its own beer. In 1856 Alfred, Lord Tennyson began the Idylls of the King while staying at the inn. The medieval tower and the town of Caerleon are mentioned many times in the poem.

The Hanbury Arms brewery merged with Eastern Valleys brewery of Pontnewynydd in 1910 before being taken over by Hancock's Brewery in 1914. In 2001 it was purchased by SA Brain. The business operates until 11.30pm during weekends. It hosts regular live performances from local and international musicians, especially so during the yearly Caerleon Arts Festival each summer.

== Gallery ==
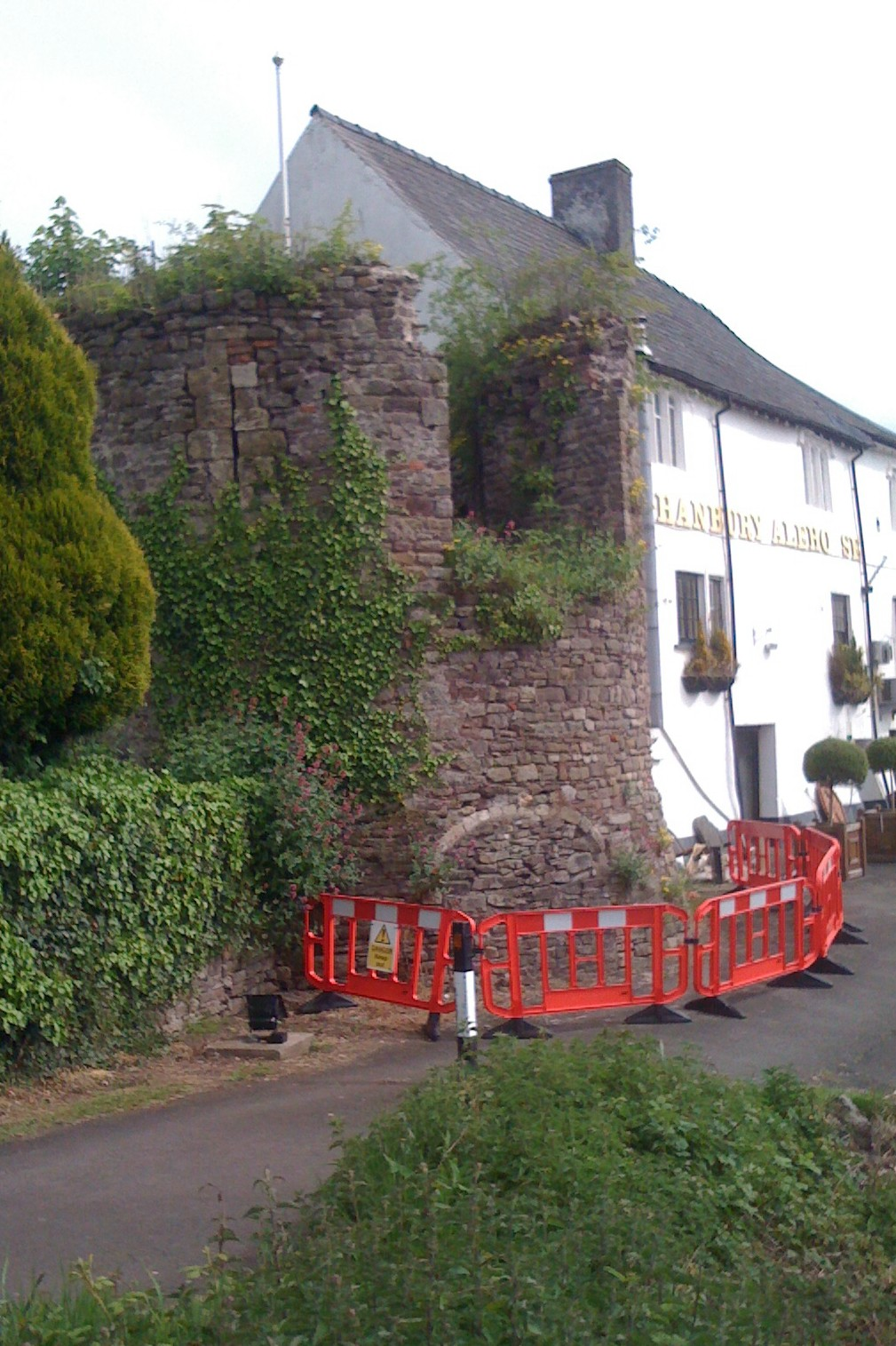
Caerleon-Round Tower

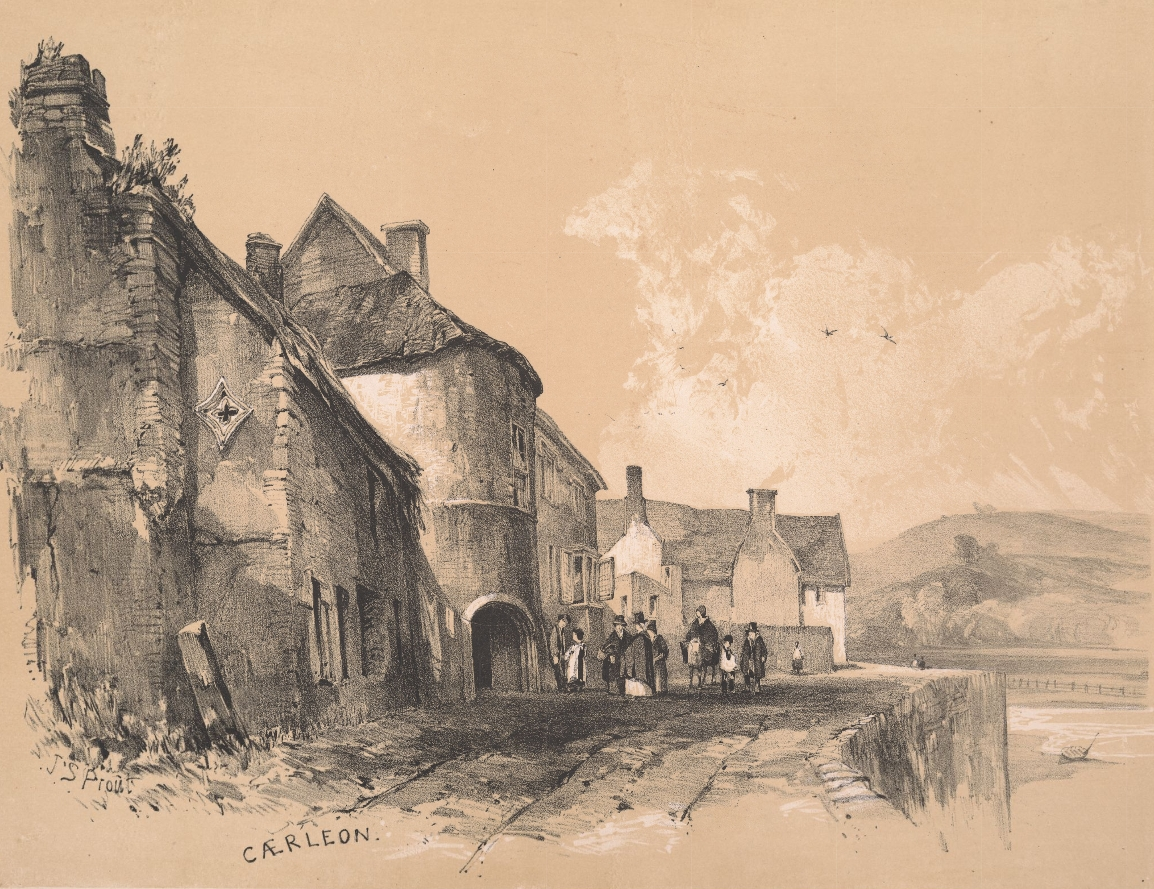
John Skinner Prout - Caerleon

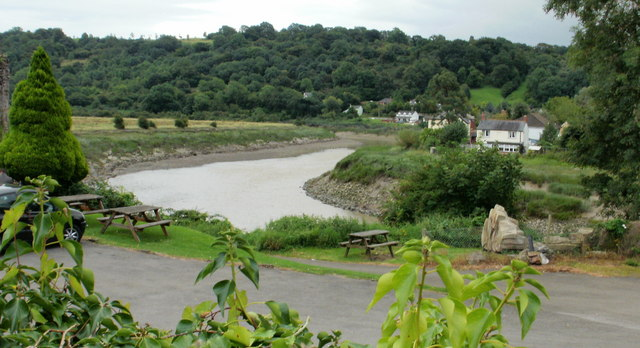
River and woods view, Caerleon - geograph.org.uk - 1594564
