= The Mynde (Caerleon) =

Historic site and property in the former Roman fortress of Caerleon, South Wales

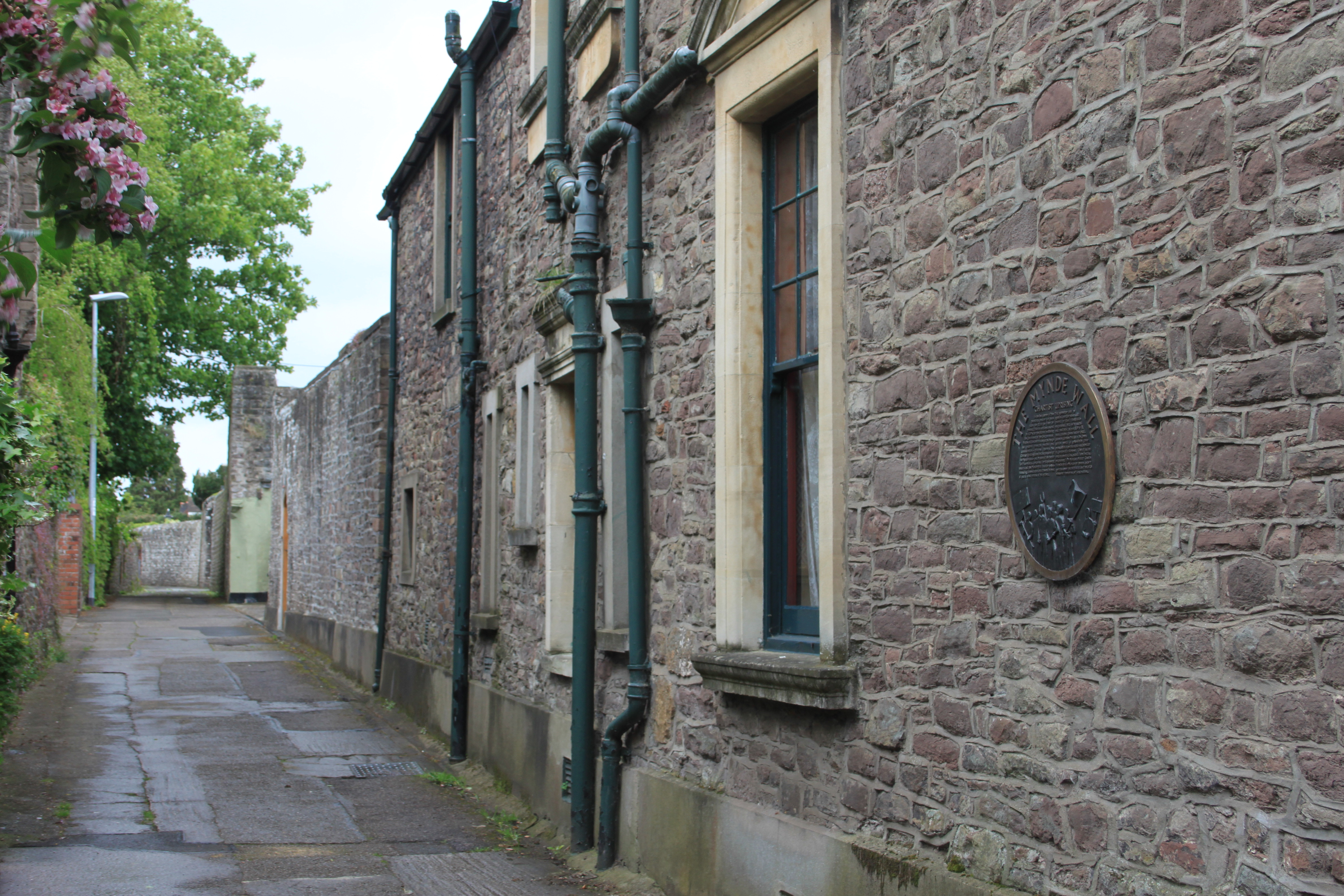
- The town walls that guard the Mynde

- Location within Newport

General information
- Architectural style: Modern (house); Regency era walls Roman and Medieval (foundations)
- Location: Caerleon, Newport, Wales
- Coordinates: 51.609445°N 2.951748°W
- Completed: 1067–1075 (castle); 1839 (walls)
- Renovated: 1928, 1938, 1978

Technical details
- Size: 8,100 sq ft house 3.5 acres land

The Mynde (Welsh: Y Mynde) is a historic site and property located in Caerleon on the northern outskirts of the city of Newport. The town is the historic site of the Isca Augusta Roman Fortress.

== History ==
=== Roman Era ===
Caerleon has been settled since 75 AD on the arrival of the Roman legion which established their port and outpost. The town has a number of well preserved Roman sites including Caerleon Amphitheatre, military bath houses, Field Barracks, and the fortress wall, which is 12 feet (3.7m) high.

The site has been linked as a burial place of King Arthur, with Nennius' 830 AD work Historia Brittonum referring to 'The City Of The Legion', a city some believe is Caerleon. The Castle of Caerleon is believed to have been established on the site between 1067 and 1075 during the Anglo-Norman advance from Chepstow to the west.

=== Chartism and 19th-century expansion ===
Land in the area would have consisted of Roman and medieval stone ruins until the 19th century, when stone was moved and soil filled on the site to construct walls for the present day Mynde. The present site was formed in 1839 to protect the then owner, local industrialist John Jenkins, from the Chartist protesters fighting for universal suffrage in Newport. At the time it is believed that extensive remains of a Roman villa were uncovered.

=== Present day ===
The site is a special interest site registered by the Welsh conservation body Cadw, and the walls surrounding the land are a Grade II listed structure. Local figure Dr Russell Rhys, founder of the Caerleon Arts Festival, previously resided on the site, where he also established the Ffwrwm arts centre opposite the Mynde. The freehold has been acquired by the Celtic Manor Resort for use as a retreat and luxury residence.

== The building ==
The current property is a 8,100 ft^{2} (750 m^{2}) house built in 1928, in a 3.5-acre (1.4 ha) walled site.
