= The Blind Tiger Club, Brighton =

Music venue in Brighton, England

Coordinates: 50°49′28″N 0°08′08″W

The Blind Tiger Club
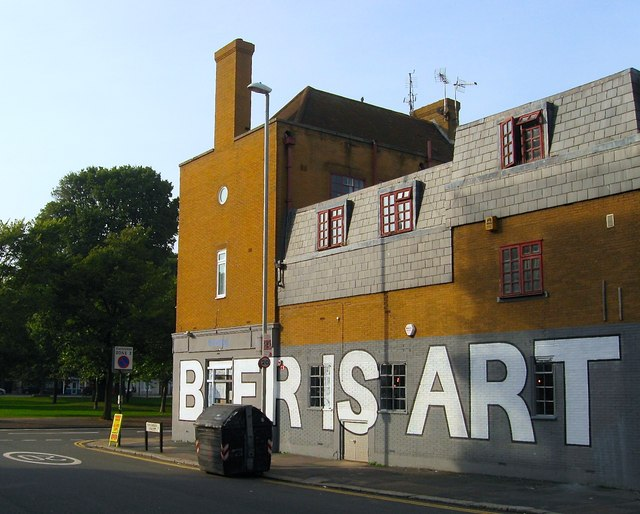
- The building in 2015, after the music venue had closed and become a BrewDog pub.
- Interactive map of The Blind Tiger Club
- Location: Grand Parade, Brighton, England
- Capacity: 250
- Type: Music venue

Construction
- Opened: 2010
- Closed: 2014

The Blind Tiger Club was a mixed music, arts and community venue in Brighton, England, which opened in 2010. The venue closed in 2014, and Time Out described the venue as "semi-legendary", in its round-up of Brighton's live music scene that year. In 2015, Gigwise included the club in their list of the UK's Greatest Lost Venues.

== History ==
The Blind Tiger Club was located at 52-54 Grand Parade, opposite the University of Brighton Faculty of Arts and close to the Royal Pavilion. The premises had been licensed for drinking and entertainment since they were originally built in the mid-1800s.

From its creation and for most of the 20th Century the premises traded as 'The Norfolk Arms'. In the 1990s, the venue was renamed 'Hector's House' after the children's television show Hector's House which screened on the BBC from 1965 to 1970.

As 'Hector's House', the performance of live music and DJs became more important to the licensed premises, with the space gaining a reputation as "a showcase for up and coming bands" and one of Brighton's key small live music venues, regularly taking part in The Great Escape Festival and other annual arts events.

In December 2013, the venue launched a membership scheme, stating that without support from members it could "fail in its mission to evolve the business into a stable social enterprise". In April 2014, a Noise Abatement Notice was issued under the Environmental Protection Act 1990, following complaints by a rental tenant in a one-bedroom flat on the floor above, over the preceding months. The venue closed in May 2014, with the local council's enforcement of a de facto music prohibition, since an unamplified drum kit was judged as illegally loud in the tenant's flat. After mid-May 2014, causing noise disturbance from music performance would have incurred automatic fines in excess of £25,000 for every occasion. More than 15,000 people signed a Change.org petition started by a clubgoer, calling for the club to be saved.

Outcry over the closure of the venue fed into national concerns which were building up by 2014, of the difficulties facing independent live music venues, that did not receive government funding or protection. Such concerns contributed to the creation that year of the Music Venue Trust.

The music venue was a BrewDog pub until July 2025.

The venue will be reopening as Hector's House in 2026.
