= Toilet circuit =

Network of small music venues in the UK

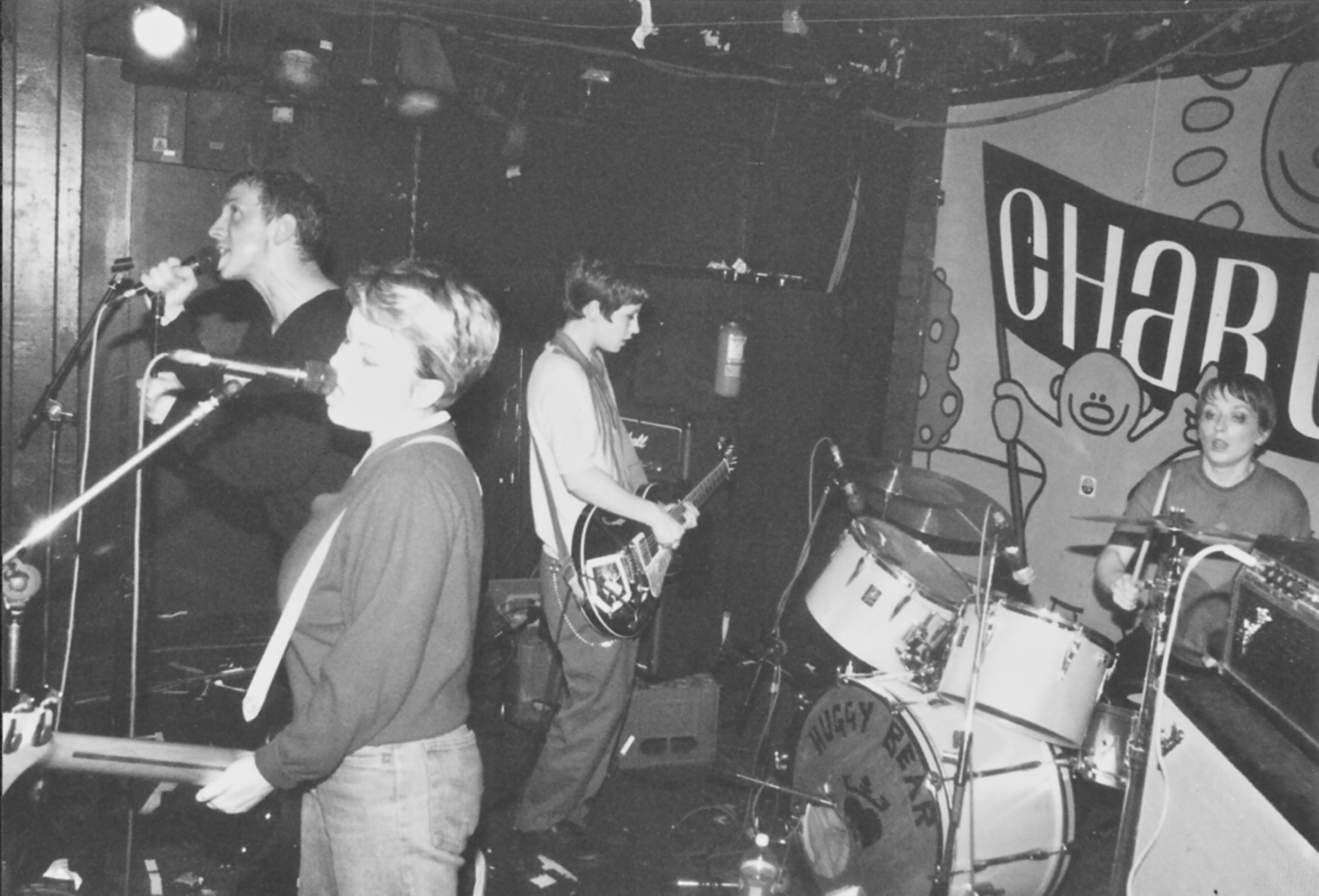
Huggy Bear at the Charlotte, Leicester

The toilet circuit is the network of small music venues in the United Kingdom which rising indie, rock and metal bands often visit to gain support and promote themselves. The name may refer to the size and often the cleanliness of the venue, or a lack of dressing rooms leading to the band being required to change in the toilets.

Most of Britain's large towns and cities are home to at least one toilet circuit venue, although a regular toilet circuit tour is only around 20 dates long at the most, meaning not all of the said venues are present in all toilet-circuit tours. Some of the largest cities, however, such as London, Manchester, Glasgow and Nottingham, appear on almost every tour, and these cities accordingly have many venues which could be described as "toilet venues". The circuit is mentioned in the Muse song "Muscle Museum" – "I have played in every toilet." Frank Turner also references it in the song "I Still Believe", as "toilet circuit touring stops".

The 21st century saw the closure of several well-known toilet circuit venues, with many more under threat. In London, for example, 40% of the city's live music venues were said to have closed in the decade to 2016. This trend increased after the passing of the Live Music Act 2012, which allowed any venue with under 200 capacity to hold live music without a licence, and has been cited as a major factor in the decline of paid-entry live music events.

Rock Sound TV has used the "Toilet Circuit" moniker to film a series of acoustic performances filmed in the grimiest locations at music venues across the UK, featuring bands such as The Blackout, Thrice, Futures, Lights, Vessels and Deaf Havana.

== Notable toilet circuit venues ==
- Buzz Club, Aldershot (1985–1993)
- Moles, Bath (1977–2023)
- Esquires, Bedford (opened 1990)
- The Fleece, Bristol
- The Victoria Inn, Derby
- King Tut's Wah Wah Hut, Glasgow (opened 1990)
- The Square, Harlow (closed 2016)
- The New Adelphi Club, Hull (opened 1984)
- The Cockpit, Leeds (opened 1994, closed 2014)
- The Duchess of York, Leeds
- The Charlotte, Leicester (closed 2010)
- The Zanzibar, Liverpool
- The Barfly, Camden Town, London (opened 1996)
- Dublin Castle, Camden, London
- The Bull and Gate, London
- The Roadhouse, Manchester (closed 2015)
- TJ's, Newport (reopened 2018 as El Siecco's)
- The Waterfront, Norwich
- Rock City, Nottingham (opened 1980)
- Jericho Tavern, Oxford
- The Zodiac, Oxford (became O2 Academy Oxford in 2007)
- The Boardwalk, Sheffield (opened 1960s, closed 2010)
- The Leadmill, Sheffield (opened 1980)
- The Sugarmill, Stoke-on-Trent (opened 1995)
- Joiners Arms, Southampton
- The Forum, Tunbridge Wells (opened 1993)
- Fibbers, York
