= Music Venue Trust =

British charitable organisation

- Abbreviation: MVT
- Formation: January 2014; 12 years ago
- Type: Charitable organisation
- Registration no.: England and Wales: 1159846; Scotland: SC052001
- Location: c/o Strongroom, 120–124 Curtain Road, Shoreditch, London EC2A 3SQ, England, United Kingdom
- Region served: United Kingdom, United States
- CEO: Mark Davyd
- COO: Beverley Whitrick
- Staff: 16
- Website: https://www.musicvenuetrust.com/

Music Venue Trust is a UK registered charity founded in 2014 to protect, secure and improve grassroots music venues across the United Kingdom.

Established in response to the increasing closure of grassroots music venues, the organisation undertakes research, advocacy, campaigning and direct investment to support the long-term sustainability of the sector.

Paul McCartney has spoken out in support of the MVT: "If we don’t support live music at this level then the future of music in general is in danger."

== History ==
Concerned by a growing number of closures across the United Kingdom and therefore the decline in the number of spaces available for artists to perform and connect with audiences, a group of individuals came together in 2014 to form the organisation. Recognising the vital role that music venues play , MVT adopted a proactive approach to protect and champion these cultural spaces.

The term grassroots music venue, which was coined by Beverley Whitrick, COO of MVT, in 2014, came into usage in 2015 and has subsequently been adopted by industry and government.

== Issues ==
One of the key reasons for the foundation of the MVT was the high rate of permanent closure of many music venues due to various pressures, including rising business rates, increased operational costs and noise complaints from new developments, such as Brighton's Blind Tiger Club; this is especially important as noise complaints are becoming more frequent, as new laws have been introduced that make it easier to convert offices into housing.

Another key concern that MVT claimed venues faced is Arts Council England's lack of funding for venues; Beverley Whitrick, then Strategic Director of MVT, said in 2017 she could not estimate how many clubs would close in the next five years.

Planning and Licensing Laws: MVT campaigns for legal protections, such as the "Agent of Change" principle, which places the responsibility for noise mitigation on new property developers rather than existing venues.

Lack of Recognition as Cultural Infrastructure: MVT advocates for better recognition that GMVs have a cultural importance on a par with theatres, concert halls, museums and galleries and should be supported through policy and funding mechanisms in a similar way.

Unsustainable Business Models: The charity highlights the narrow profit margins (often less than 1%) of the grassroots venues sector and pushes for sustainable economic models such as the Grassroots Levy.

== Initiatives ==
The MVA founded an international affiliate organisation in Austin, Texas in 2016, targeting state taxes that are seen as punitive towards local venues, as well as the MVA New Zealand, where they advocating to have Agent of Change recognised and adopted. To clarify its political aims ahead of the 2017 general election, the MVT launched a "Manifesto for Music 2017" in May of that year. Two months later, in order to help fight the issues and closures that music venues in the UK were facing, the MVT announced that they would cooperate with Live Nation Entertainment's Ticketweb to sell "Grassroots Venues Tickets", which had a part of their service charge donated to help fund the MVT's efforts.

== Grassroots Levy ==
In 2015 MVT published "Understanding Small Music Venues – A report by the Music Venue Trust" in which it stated "Sustainable models for channeling investment from the upper echelons of the music industry into the grassroots circuit should be devised and implemented without delay". In 2018 the charity called for the music industry to commit to a "Pipeline Investment Fund" to support activity in the grassroots sector of the music industry. Giving evidence at the Live Music Culture, Media and Sport Committee on Wednesday 10 October 2018, Mark Davyd, CEO of MVT referred to a live-music tax of 3% on the price of any ticket in France.

Speaking at Venues Day in London in October 2023 DCMS Select Committee Chair Dame Caroline Dinenage MP announced a hearing and review into the crisis facing grassroots music venues (GMVS)

In May 2024 the UK's Culture, Media and Sport Committee (CMS) published a major report on Grassroots Music Venues (GMVs), urging a voluntary blanket ticket levy on major concerts by September 2024 The Government's response, published on 14 November, included the statement "We agree with the Committee’s recommendation that the music industry should introduce a voluntary levy on arena and stadium tickets to support grassroots music venues, artists and promoters." to which the CMS Committee responded. In his response on 27 November Creative Industries Minister Sir Chris Bryant wrote that the Government wants to see ‘tangible progress’ by the first quarter of next year to meet the timeline of a levy coming in as soon as possible for concerts in 2025. He also announced that he will hold a ministerial roundtable before Christmas (2024) with live music representatives to drive progress.

In December 2024, MVT announced the Liveline Fund, a partnership with the campaigning organisation Save Our Scene through which donations and revenue from live concerts could be distributed to the grassroots. Coldplay pledged to give 10% of the band's proceeds from its 2025 UK stadium shows. Katy Perry and Enter Shikari also adopted the scheme giving £1 for every ticket sold for their UK arena shows. Sam Fender donated his Mercury Prize winnings of £25,000 as well as including the levy on his 2024 UK arena tour

On 15 January 2025 LIVE, the umbrella organisation for the live music industry, announced the formation of the LIVE Trust as the charitable vehicle to receive and administer funds generated by the grassroots levy on concerts with a capacity over 5000

In 2025 it was announced that the Royal Albert Hall it would include the £1 levy on all its commercial rock and pop concerts, becoming the first 5000+ capacity venue to do so.

In January 2026, the LIVE Trust announced the first distribution of £500,000 of which MVT received £200,000 for music venue support programmes. In July 2026, the LIVE Trust announced a second funding round distributing £1 million to organisations delivering programmes supporting grassroots music venues, artists, promoters and festivals, including MVT.

Creative Industries Minister Ian Murray wrote to NME in March 2026 about the need for the industry and Live Nation to “step up to help the next generation of talent”, or else the government will be forced to intervene and make the levy mandatory by law. He wrote that just 30 percent of arena and stadium tickets for 2026 included the levy, falling short of the target of 50 percent..

== Annual Report ==
In 2017 MVT conducted its first annual survey of members of the Music Venues Alliance. The resulting data was used internally for planning and strategy, and for the charity's advocacy with partners, industry and government. The data from the survey in 2022 was used to create the charity's first published Annual Report. Published on 31 January 2023, the report stated that Grassroots Music Venues contributed £500m to UK Economy, live performances were down by 16.7% as profit margins shrank and audience numbers were down 11% as cost of living crisis hit. MVT called for reductions in VAT & Business Rates and for planned new arenas to invest in the Grassroots Music Eco-System.

The Annual Report 2023, published on 24 January 2024, stated that 38% of UK Grassroots Music Venues had posted a financial loss; the sector had recorded a 0.5% profit margin on £501m turnover despite increased ticket demand; 16% of UK Grassroots Music Venues were lost in the previous 12 months with 125 spaces permanently closed to live music.

The Annual Report 2024, published on 24 January 2025, raised concerns over the collapse of touring, a 19% increase in venues accessing the Emergency Response Service, a 29% increase in venues registered as not-for profit entities, and GMVs operated on a profit margin of just 0.48% with 43.8% of them reporting a loss in the last 12 months.

The Annual Report 2025 was launched at the V&A Museum on 20 January and published on 21 January 2026. The report stated that more than half (53%) of the UK’s GMVs showed no profit at all in 2025; there had been a 19% downturn in employment as government tax changes resulted in over 6000 job losses; 30 venues permanently closed, and 175 UK towns & cities no longer receive regular touring shows by professional artists. The charity announced it would be investing £2 million into a number of targeted programs designed to permanently reduce costs and improve sustainability as well as expanding its Venue Support Team and Emergency Hardship Relief Fund.

== Music Venue Properties ==
Music Venue Properties Limited
- Type: Charitable community benefit society
- Founded: 5 July 2021; 5 years ago
- Revenue: 693,232 pound sterling (2026)
- Total assets: 3,641,714 pound sterling (2026)
- Members: 2563 (2026)
- Number of employees: 2 (2026)
- Website: https://www.musicvenueproperties.com

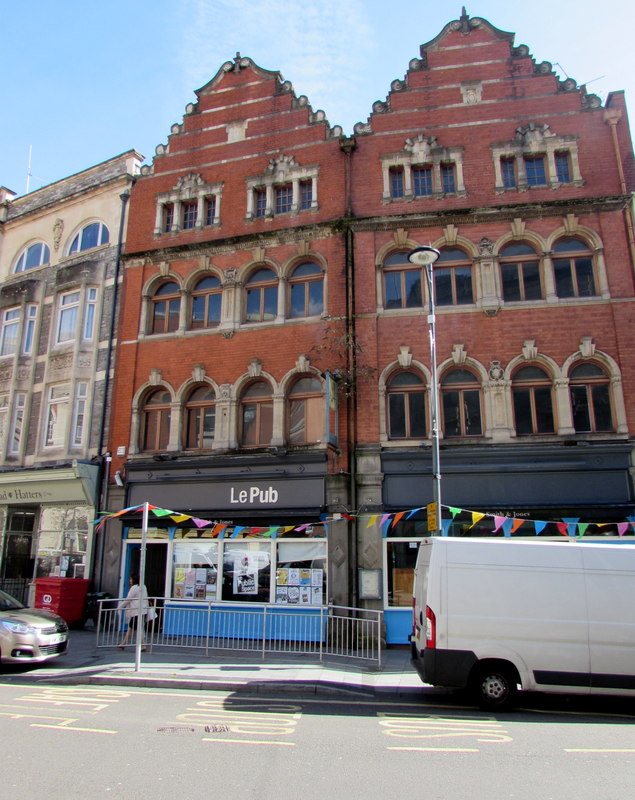
Le Pub in Newport, Wales, which is owned by Music Venue Properties.

In May 2022, the MVT launched Music Venue Properties, a charitable community benefit society to raise money in order to purchase grassroots music venues and preserve them. The grassroots venues it owns are leased to operators on favourable terms under a long-term "Cultural Lease". It has been described as "the National Trust for music venues".

Music Venue Properties was founded in 2021 as a charitable community benefit society, at a time when grassroots music venues across the UK were under threat, with a third of venues being lost in the previous 20 years. They launched their first fundraising campaign, "Own Our Venues", in May 2022, with the aim of raising up to £3,500,000 to purchase nine grassroots music venues across the UK. The campaign concluded in March 2023, after £2,318,210 had been raised from 1,261 individual investors.

In October 2023, The Snug, a 100-capacity venue in Atherton, Greater Manchester, was the first venue to be purchased.

In May 2025, Music Venue Properties announced their second fundraising campaign, with the aim of purchasing a further seven venues.. In July 2026 Music Venue Properties announced the purchase of The Pipeline, a 60 capacity venue in Brighton.

As of July 2026 over £7million had been raised from more than 2500 investors including Glenn Tilbrook of Squeeze, Katie Melua, Brighton-based DJ and producer Fatboy Slim, aka Norman Cook, who urged other musicians to also invest, and the UK Prime Minister Andy Burnham.

=== Venues ===
As of July 2026, Music Venue Properties owns ten music venues:

- The Snug, Atherton, Greater Manchester
- The Ferret, Preston, Lancashire
- The Bunkhouse, Swansea, Wales
- The Booking Hall, Dover, Kent
- Le Pub, Newport, Wales
- The Joiners, Southampton
- The Croft, Bristol
- Gut Level, Sheffield
- Northern Guitars, Leeds
- The Pipeline, Brighton
