= Newport City Radio =

Welsh radio station

- Newport; Wales

Programming
- Languages: English, Welsh
- Format: Community radio
- Affiliations: Community Media Association

Ownership
- Owner: Newport City Radio Community Interest Company

History
- First air date: 2007

Technical information
- Class: Community
- Transmitter coordinates: 51.591474°N 2.990636°W

Links
- Webcast: Live feed
- Website: newportcityradio.org

The NEON
- Location within Newport

General information
- Location: Newport City Radio; The Neon; Clarence Place; Newport; NP19 7AB, Wales
- Coordinates: 51.591474°N 2.990636°W

Newport City Radio is a community radio station serving the city of Newport, in south east Wales. It broadcasts online via its website and the TuneIn service. It was previously named Urban Circle Radio.

== History ==
The station was launched in 2007 by Ali Boshk. It remains the only community radio station in the city, and was established when the station benefitted from a 3-year funding grant from the National Lottery Community Fund. The station began as part of the Urban Circle projects, a social enterprise led by young people focussed on offering broadcast media training to young people in Newport. Current Managing Director Ian Lamsdale joined the organisation in 2008.

Between 2008 and 2010 the station was broadcast on 87.9FM under an Ofcom community radio licence.

In 2024, Newport City Radio will join the Gwent DAB Multiplex.

In 2011, the station refocussed following the end of its grant funding. The organisation already engaged with a diverse range of people across the city, and stated on its website that it would change direction to aim to "(empower) people of all ages, all abilities with training and development in radio broadcasting". It was also in 2011 that the organisation registered on the Mutuals Register as a Community Interest Company.

== Current activities ==
The station now has 50 active volunteers broadcasting to a 100,000 plus population in the region. The station can often be seen at events in the city, such as Newport County and Dragons sporting events, major entertainment and cultural occasions, and the 2019 Record Store Day in the city.

Each year the station organises the Love Live Music Song Contest, aimed at exposing local songwriters and composers to a wider audience, with an awards night held at The NEON each year.

In 2017, the station took part in #WeStandTogether, an event held in tribute to the victims of the Manchester Arena bombing, alongside Newport City Council, SEWREC, and the Islamic Society of Wales, with the occasion led particularly by young people and families of the same age as those who were victims of the attack. Young people from the station provided a live music set and words of reflection.
