= St Mary's, Southampton =

Area of Southampton, England

Coordinates: 50.9056°N 1.3965°W

St. Mary's
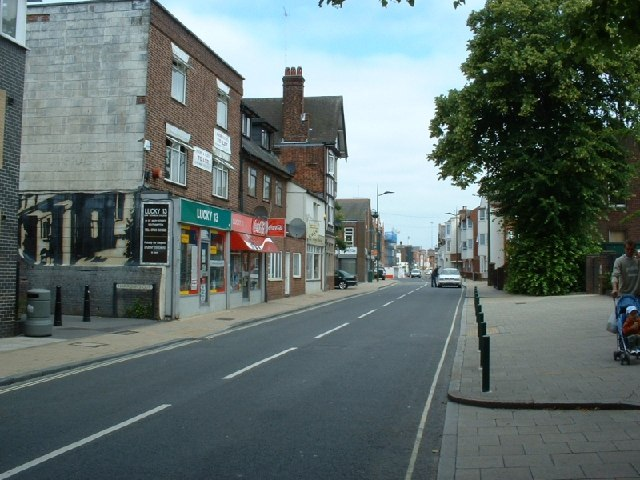
- St Mary's Street. Looking North.

- Location within Southampton
- Unitary authority: Southampton
- Ceremonial county: Hampshire
- Region: South East
- Country: England
- Sovereign state: United Kingdom
- Post town: SOUTHAMPTON
- Postcode district: SO14
- Dialling code: 023
- Police: Hampshire and Isle of Wight
- Fire: Hampshire and Isle of Wight
- Ambulance: South Central
- UK Parliament: Southampton Itchen

St Mary's is an inner city area of Southampton in England. It consists of two areas separated by Six Dials junction. The northern section of the district is bounded by St Mary's Road and some streets to the west and the area to the east is Nicholstown-Newtown. The northern section is home to the fire station.

The majority of St Mary's is in the southern portion, to the east of St Mary Street. This is where St Mary's church is located, from which the suburb's name originates. The southern section is also home to the Golden Grove area. It is bordered on the east by the rail lines (the other side of these lines is the district of Chapel). It gives its name to St Mary's Stadium, where Southampton Football Club play, although the stadium itself is in the neighbouring suburb of Northam.

== History ==
The area was originally home to much of the saxon town of Hamwic. It reverted to farmland in the 11th century and continued to be used in that role until the 18th century. After World war 2 council estates were built in the area including the 1960s built Golden Grove estate.

== Church ==
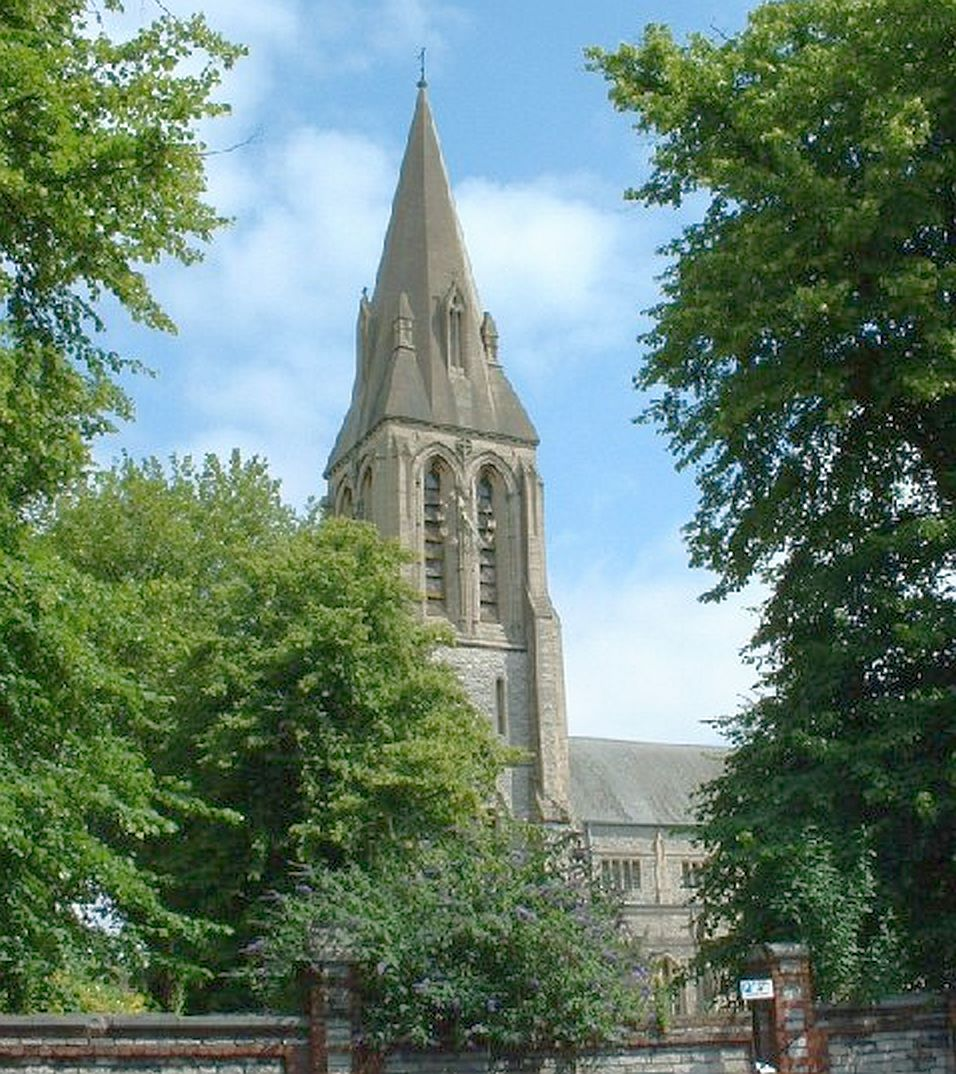
St Mary's Church

St Mary's Church serves many Christians in the area. The church has peels of bells which ring on Monday nights, which inspired the writing of the song "The bells of St. Mary's", later sung by Bing Crosby.

The football club now known as Southampton Football Club were founded at St Mary's Church, on 21 November 1885 by members of the St Mary's Church of England Young Men's Association. The club was originally known as St. Mary's Young Men's Association F.C. (usually abbreviated to "St. Mary's Y.M.A.") and then became simply St. Mary's F.C. in 1887–88, before adopting the name Southampton St. Mary's when the club joined the Southern League in 1894. After winning the Southern League title in 1896–97, the club became a limited company and was renamed Southampton F.C.

== Culture ==
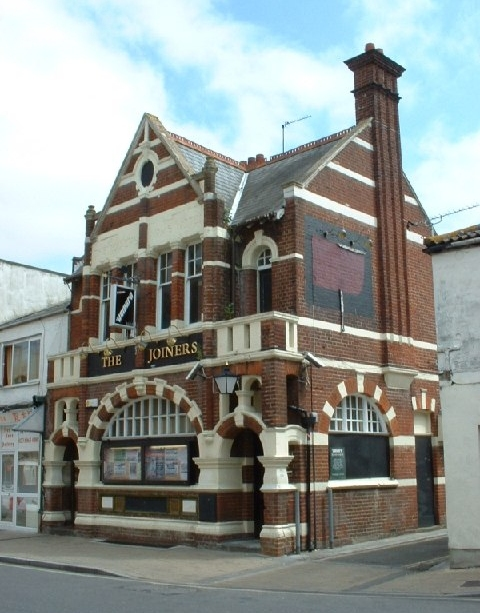
The Joiners, St Mary's

The area is home to The Joiners in St Mary Street, one of Southampton's music venues and known for hosting acts such as Oasis, Coldplay and Muse. In June 2013 it was named Britain's Best Small Venue by NME.

There are two radio stations that broadcast from St Mary's, 103.9 Voice FM provides an eclectic mix of programming. Unity 101 is a community radio catering to the Asian and ethnic minority communities.

== See also ==
- Hamwic
