= Muragh =

Medieval tax levied in Britain and Ireland

Muragh or murage was a medieval tax levied mainly in England and Wales and Ireland, but also in some places in Scotland and France, for the construction or maintenance of town walls. The term comes into English from Old French, ultimately from Latin murus meaning a wall. Muragh, also referred to as murage, was generally a term used for the tax meant for the repairs of the defensive walls that enclosed towns in historical England, Wales, Ireland. Beginning as a defence against Viking raids, the tax continued through the Middle Ages before declining in the 17th century, as many town walls ceased to be regarded as important militarily after the English Civil War.

Construction of the walls with the use of the muragh tax was a way for a market town to generate the revenue needed to pay for its own defense. Typically, muragh was granted for a short period of time typically lasting a few years with opportunities to renew until the completion of wall. Later, the grant for muragh to be collected could last indefinitely in Ireland. The construction of town walls, or the desire to have them, was higher in Wales and Ireland due to their differences in ethnicities. Due to the nature of the tax, it was possible the tax could be used to collect funds for non-defensive walls, like a safety rail on a bridge, because of the loose classification of the civic improvement taxes. The tax rate for the muragh was a small percentage of the value of the good which is estimated to be under 1% of the value. Overall, there are records of 1470 muragh grants recorded in England, France, Scotland, and Wales.

Collection of muraghs were tasked to individuals granted by royal appointment, although some towns appointed their own collector.

== Intent ==
The building of walled towns was initially intended to defend against Viking incursions. The intent of the muragh also included walls meant for sea defense and defense against natural disasters resulting from flooding in towns near rivers or the ocean; although, they were mainly intended for military defense. In Bristol, England, the recognition of need to use muragh tax collection to repair due to natural disasters was the first allowance of this nature. Due to the River Froom being dangerous and difficult to navigate, the use of muragh to also create trenches around the wall to continue to protect the town and prevent further damage from being done as well as support the local economy through creating a more accessible harbor for trade. The construction of town walls was a communal act, ordered by the king during those times. A muragh was taken mainly on goods being imported into the town to be sold.

The first grant of muragh began in Shrewbury's grant of 1220 at a rate of 4d. for a boatload of goods coming into the town, and then smaller derivatives for horse-loads, cows, pigs, goats, and sheep. Many towns copied each-others muragh lists of duties once the taxes for each good were developed. Under King Henry III of England it is recorded the exact prices of all goods coming into Bristol in the Patent Roll for his 16th year of reign.

The advantages of having built a town wall on trade include the opportunity to attract traders and new consumers through the use of impressive gates to show wealth and prestige as well as limiting theft and smuggling outside of the city walls. Prestigious cities attracted more retailers and allowed the price of goods to increase. The addition of decorative doors and gates to the wall did not add to their defensive abilities, but effected the trade within the city.

The reason for the wall was primarily state defense, as the role of medieval royal government was to protect law and order and defend the state. If the town wanted to build a wall for the benefits of market regulation they must have the primary concern of defense. The royal government was often inclined to support the construction of walls because it emphasized state defense, even in cases when the tax hurt the economy. In the case of Coventry in 1370, King Edward III revoked the muragh tax due to the negative effects on the economy and moved the cost of building the wall onto the wealthier citizens of the town to continue the construction of the wall. Additional records of royal orders for England, Wales, and Ireland can be found in The Calendar of Patent Rolls.

The royal government also supported the use of muragh for having town walls because it defended their position as the defenders of the realm. The walls were built with the approval and support of the royal government with the primary goal of defending the town. This provided support for the usefulness and necessity of a central government to the citizens. The support during these times was necessary due to the walls protecting against invasion and civil uprising and war to protect the people while maintaining the integrity of the monarchy.

The use of mural houses in Oxford allowed citizens to live rent-free or tax-free under the condition that they would repair the town wall.

== Origin ==
The term murage, while having this specific meaning, could also refer to other aid for walls or to the walls themselves. It is generally applied to defensive town walls but can also refer to flood defences and sea walls. The tax was taken in many towns in Ireland and in English possessions in France.

This was granted by the king by letters patent for a limited term, but the walls were frequently not completed within the term, so the grant was periodically renewed. Such grants sometimes specifically state that they were to be taken for the repair and maintenance of walls. In the later Middle Ages, many places had a vested collection of murage.

The earliest grant was for Shrewsbury in 1218. (Actually, the grant is dated 26 June 1220.) Other towns receiving early grants included Bridgnorth, Stafford, Worcester, Oxford, Gloucester, and Bristol. Many of these places were in the west of England, and were particularly at risk from Welsh incursions.

Since the king's writ did not run in Wales, it is perhaps surprising that several Welsh towns also obtained murage grants. The first was for Hay on Wye in 1232, the year after the town was burnt by Llywelyn the Great. Other towns in Wales or the Welsh Marches having such grants included Oswestry, Radnor, Abergavenny, Carmarthen, Monmouth, Knighton, Montgomery, and Clun. Clun is now fully in England and Knighton partly so. However few such grants were made after 1283, after the completion of the Edward I's Conquest of Wales.

Some of the walls for which murage was granted were probably enclosing towns for the first time. Others, such as at Worcester, were extensions to walls in order to bring suburbs inside the town, or to fund the repair of existing walls, as was the case at Canterbury, to which murage was granted in 1378, 1379, 1385, 1399 and 1402.

In the Lordship of Ireland, murage was used to build walls around Dublin (1221), Galway (1270), Trim (1289–90), Fethard (1292), Castledermot (1275), Kilkenny, Drogheda, Youghal, Dundalk, Naas and many other places; as much of Ireland was not under royal control, cities loyal to the King needed walls to protect them from Gaelic Irish raiders. In Dublin there was a major scandal over murage in 1311–12, when it emerged that none of the funds collected for murage had actually been spent on repairs to the city walls.

"Ye Olde Murenger House", a public house in High Street, Newport, South Wales, dated to about 1530, takes its name from the collector of this toll.

== Exemptions ==
The church was exempted from the muragh tax in some cases. This was due to the church having lawyers and access to a larger amount of liberties because of their grasp in the legal system. This caused some strife when a town would continue to impose the tax on those exempt from it and was documented. Such cases include St Mary's Abbey and St Leonard's Hospital in 1257 in the town of York, where those exempt from the tax were forced to pay after experiencing difficulties in getting the exemption renewed.

== Decline ==
Following the English Civil War, the use of town gates and walls became too much of a burden. With the increased growth of urban centers and higher traffic there was a need to begin the process of demolition. Surviving gates were often lesser gates, not the main gate, due to the need for larger entrances to support more traffic.

== Other sources ==
- Turner, H. L. (1971). Town Defences in England and Wales. London.
- Thomas, A. (1992). The Walled Towns of Ireland. Vol. 2 vols. Irish Academic Press.
- Lyte, Maxwell, ed. (1901). Calendar of Patent Rolls Henry III (1216–25) (PDF). Vol. 1. pp. 238–9. Archived from the original (PDF) on 2016-04-28.
- Ballard, A.; Tait, J., eds. (1923). British borough charters, 1216–1307. Cambridge The University Press. pp. 347.
- King, P. W. (2007). "Medieval Turnpikes". Journal of Railway and Canal Historical Society. 35 (10): 740–1.
- "Canterbury's City Walls".
