= Le Pub =

Music venue in Newport, Wales

- Le Public Space
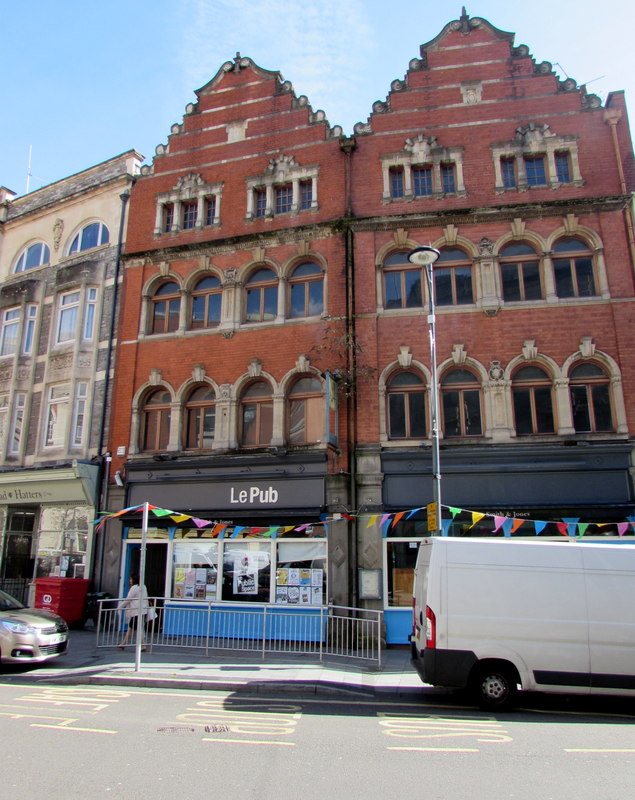
- Le Pub, at 14 High Street, Newport
- Interactive map of Le Pub
- Address: 14 High Street, NP20 1FW
- Location: Newport, Wales
- Coordinates: 51.58944°N 2.99703°W
- Owner: Co-operative
- Seating type: Mixed standing and seating
- Capacity: 100
- Type: Music venue, restaurant and nightclub
- Events: Rock, comedy, alternative and punk music

Construction
- Opened: 1992 (Caxton Place, Baneswell, Newport)
- Expanded: 2017 (High Street, Newport)

Website
- www.lepublicspace.co.uk

Le Pub (also known as Le Public Space) is a bar, restaurant and nightclub located in Newport, South Wales. It opened in 1992 on nearby Caxton Place, and became a popular live music venue as part of the Newport music scene along with TJ's, later relocating as a co-operative on High Street.

== History ==
Le Pub has been a popular music venue in the city for 30 years, though historically overshadowed by its more famed neighbour TJ's on Clarence Place, which had attracted names such as David Bowie and Kurt Cobain during the city's 'new Seattle' era.

While the city enjoyed a thriving scene in the 1980s and 1990s, the decline of industry and the growth of the nearby Cardiff music scene had impacted Newport hard. TJ's closed in 2010 and at one point relocated as a legacy site named El Siecco's, also on High Street. However this only lasted a few months.

Le Pub also faced difficulty during the 2000s. It existed at its home on Caxton Place for 24 years and 11 months but was forced to sell its site and move to new premises.

== Present ==
With assistance from Newport City Council, the business restarted as a community interest company offering shares to friends and patrons of the old venue, and providing it with necessary finance to refurbish new premises and re-open.

It moved to High Street on July 29, 2017, on the site of the old The Page pub (previously the South Wales Argus office), aided by a team of volunteers. It opened offering space in the city for creative projects, a gallery, rehearsal rooms, office space and a small cinema space. It has now operated in Newport city centre for 30 years.

In January 2025, the building was purchased by Music Venue Properties to safeguard its status as a grassroots music venue.

It opens until 2 am most weekdays and 3 am on Friday and Saturday evenings and offers a wide range of independent and international beers and spirits. It is also praised by Eat Out Vegan Wales as being a recommended vegan and 100% vegetarian eatery.

== See also ==
- Music of Newport
- Music of Wales
- Newport, Wales
- Newport city centre
- TJ's
- Diverse Vinyl
- El Sieco's
