= Chain of Flowers =

Welsh post-punk band

- Origin: Cardiff, Wales
- Genres: Post-punk
- Years active: 2012–present
- Labels: ALTER
- Website: flowersinchains.com

Chain of Flowers are a Welsh post-punk band formed in 2012. They have released two full-length albums, Chain of Flowers (2015) and Never Ending Space (2023), both on the ALTER label.

== Chain of Flowers (2015) ==
Chain of Flowers released their self-titled debut album, Chain of Flowers, in 2015 through Luke Younger's ALTER label. The album was also given the alternate Welsh language title, Cadwyn o Flodau. Recording took place at the Monnow Valley Studios in Wales with Gethin Pearson and Darren Lawson handling engineering duties. The album was mixed by New York based musician and producer Ben Greenberg.

Punktastic described it as "an arresting album" and "a modern post-punk classic," noting the band's blend of influences from The Cure and Joy Division. Clash Magazine said the album was "at times paranoid, at others euphoric".

== Never Ending Space (2023) ==
On 26 May 2023, Chain of Flowers released their sophomore album, Never Ending Space, again through ALTER. It was recorded at London's Total Refreshment Centre with producer Jonah Falco.

The album received favorable reviews. DIY Magazine said the album confirmed the band is "alive, well, and still heavily indebted to the gothic indie rock stylings of the 1980s." The Quietus commended the album's textured soundscapes and progression, describing it as "ambition without hubris." Joyzine further praised the album's blend of past influences with forward-looking energy, noting how it "acknowledges the past while pushing into the future." Boomkat described the album as finding "a levitational space between Joy Division, Talk Talk and The Cure," and highlighted its blend of "anthemic post-punk poetics with cavernous shoegaze reverberations and high-minded instrumentation."

=== Tracklist ===
1. Fire (In The Heart Of Hearts)
2. Cosmic Whip
3. Serving Purpose
4. Praying Hands, Turtle Doves
5. Amphetamine Luck
6. Torcalon
7. The Wall
8. Old Human Material
9. Anomia
10. Never Ending Space

== Discography ==
Studio albums
Title	Year	Label	Notes
Chain of Flowers	2015	ALTER	Also known as Cadwyn o Flodau
Never Ending Space	2023	ALTER	

== Band Members ==
Current members

- Joshua Smith
- Daniel Anderson
- Sam Hunt
- Matthew Clements
- Rich Clarke
- Danny Parsons

Former members

- Ross Jones
- Nick Rix
