= TJ's =

Music venue in Newport, Wales

- The Legendary TJ's
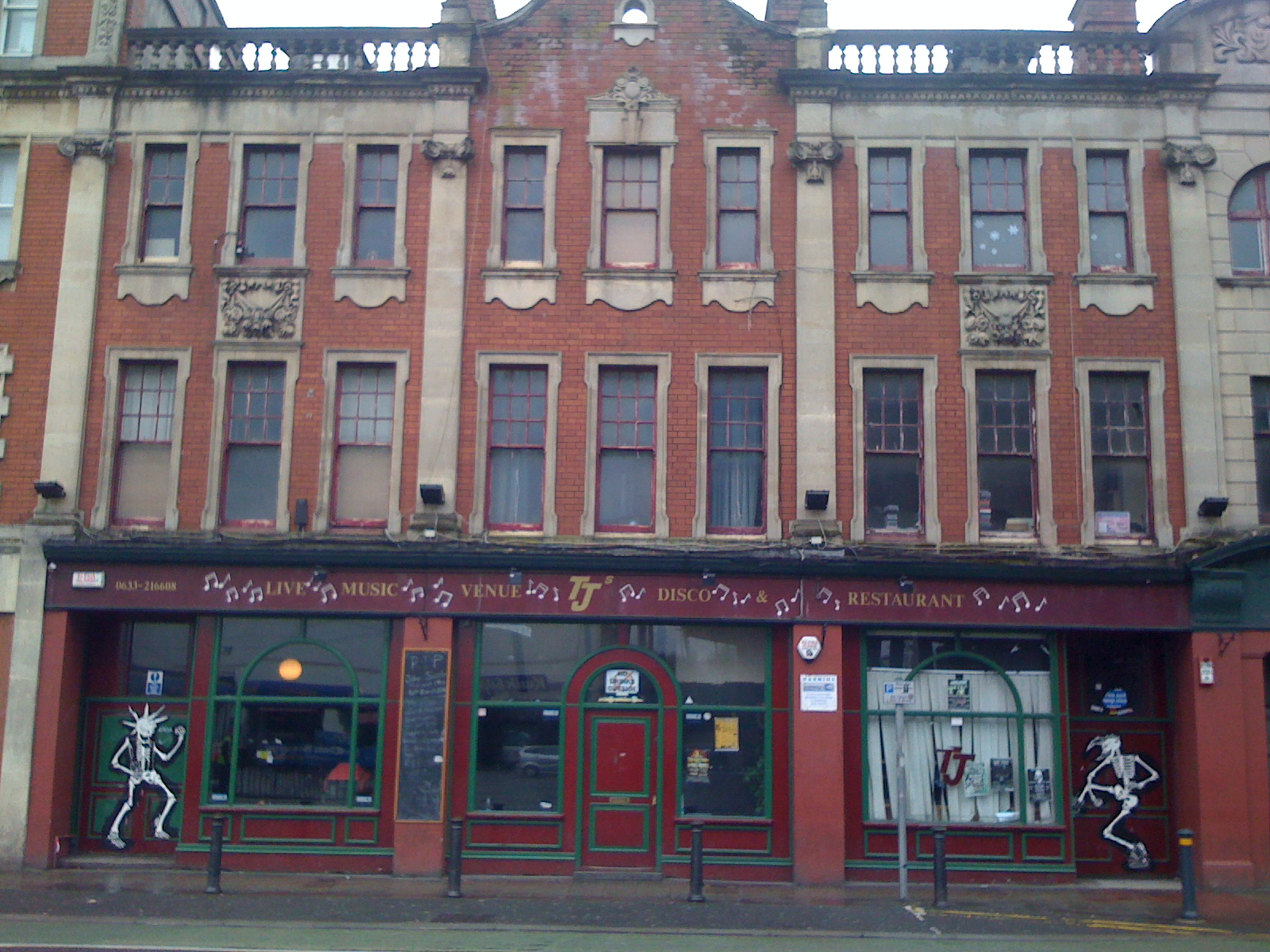
- TJ's, on Clarence Place in Newport
- Interactive map of TJ's
- Address: 16–18 Clarence Place, NP19 0AE
- Location: Newport, Wales
- Coordinates: 51.590849°N 2.991337°W
- Owner: John Sicolo (founder, 1971); Trilby Tucker 1985-93; Mehmood and Ozzeer Hassan (2011)
- Seating type: Primarily standing, some seating
- Capacity: 400
- Type: Music venue and Nightclub
- Event: Alternative

Construction
- Opened: 1971
- Expanded: 1985
- Closed: 2010

Website
- web.archive.org/web/20100218015451/http://www.tjsnewport.com/tjs/siteroot/

TJ's was a music venue and nightclub located on Clarence Place in Newport, South Wales. It opened in 1985 and shortly became a live music venue.

It was an integral part of the so-called toilet circuit and the Newport music scene, particularly catering to fans of rock music. The club was given the moniker "The Legendary TJ's by Radio 1 DJ John Peel.

TJ's closed on the death of owner John Sicolo, but his grandson Ashley opened a venue named El Sieco's on nearby Market Street, which paid tribute to the sounds and interior features from the original venue. El Sieco's permanently closed in 2020 due to the COVID-19 pandemic lockdown.

== Early form ==
John Sicolo started the venue with his then wife Vivienne in 1971 as a restaurant named "Cedar's Rest" before becoming a burger bar named "The Pittsburg Diner". Sicolo bought the premises in 1973 and extended into an adjoining property to form the nightclub "El Sieco's", during which time a variety of musical artists, including local folk acts, performed at the premises.

== Etymology ==
Some sources have suggested the venue was named using the initials of founder John Sicolo's two most important people, his sister Jeanette Sicolo, and partner Trilby Tucker, forming Trilby and Jeanette.

However others have indicated the name is a combination of Sicolo's and Tucker's, as it was Tucker was apparently the person who established TJ's as a live music venue on the premises in 1985, naming it Trilby and John's.

A further proposed connection exists which claims it was his daughter, Janet Sicolo, who worked with Sicolo's partner, Tucker, to save the club from bankruptcy in the 1980s, and as a result the name was changed from Sieco's to TJ's, meaning Trilby and Janet.

Trilby reportedly owned TJ's until her death in 1993 however media reports indicate John would then survive her ownership in the 2000s.

== History ==
=== Oasis ===
On 3 May 1994, the then up-and-coming Manchester band Oasis performed at TJ's following a small venue tour of the UK. The band were in South Wales frequently that year, recording at Loco Studios near Usk and Rockfield Studios in Monmouth, and had begun performing shortly after the release of their single "Supersonic". In a setup similar to the present day Clwb Ifor Bach, the band played to the Newport crowd on an un-raised stage, practically level with the crowd. The band performed with local group 60 Ft. Dolls, and among the concert goers were members of the Manic Street Preachers. It was later that week that Liam Gallagher was photographed for their first NME cover in Newport's King's Hotel on High Street.

=== 1990s and 2000s ===
Catatonia filmed their single "Mulder and Scully" at the venue. It is allegedly the place that Kurt Cobain proposed to Courtney Love. Other bands who have played at TJ's early in their careers include The Manic Street Preachers, Green Day, The Offspring, Lostprophets, Iron Maiden, Sabaton (band), The Stone Roses, Muse, Primal Scream, Descendents, NOFX, Misfits, Mighty Mighty Bosstones, Lagwagon, The Bouncing Souls, The Vandals, The Ataris, and Skunk Anansie.

In 2002, Jeff Killed John (forerunner band of Bullet for my Valentine) released their EP You/Play with Me through radio airplay on BBC Radio 1's broadcast at Newport's T.J.'s.

=== Popularity and fate ===
TJ's was voted one of the top 50 'Big Nights Out' in the world by FHM in December 1997. John Sicolo, owner of the club throughout its period of popularity, died on 14 March 2010, aged 66. A tribute concert in his honour, headlined by Goldie Lookin' Chain, was held in the city's John Frost Square on 10 July 2010. On 15 September 2011 TJ's was sold at auction for £242,000. On 2 February 2013, the building was damaged by a fire, suspected to be arson. In 2019 the South Wales Argus reported that the building was to be converted into a hotel, under development plans approved by Newport City Council. The development will restore the Grade II listed buildings facing Clarence Place, which had become dilapidated.

== El Sieco's ==
El Sieco's, on Market Street, Newport, featured similar sounds and design cues from the original TJ's. The venue was adorned with salvaged memorabilia and features from TJ's premises on Clarence Place. It was run by John Sicolo's grandson, Ashley since 2016 until its closure in 2020.

== See also ==
- Music of Newport
- Music of Wales
- Newport city centre
- Diverse Vinyl
- Le Pub
