= The Joiners =

Music venue in Southampton, UK

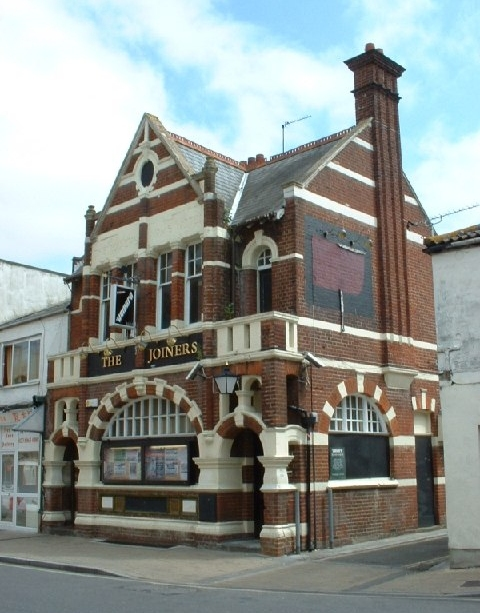

- Location within Southampton
- Location: St Mary's, Southampton
- Coordinates: 50°54′16″N 1°23′48″W
- Owner: Joiners Southampton Ltd.
- Capacity: 200

Construction
- Opened: 1968

Website
- www.joinerslive.co.uk

The Joiners is a small music venue in a former pub (The Joiners Arms) on St Mary Street, St Mary's, Southampton, England. It has played host to many up-and-coming bands. The pub started having live acts in the back room in 1968. The maximum capacity is 200 people. The venue is a member of the Music Venue Trust and is perusing a campaign for their land to be owned by the trusts' Music Venue Properties.

== History ==
In December 2006, writer Oliver Gray published a book entitled Access One Step: The Official History of the Joiners Arms, which documents the history of the venue and includes a foreword by Razorlight drummer Andy Burrows.

In 2013 and 2015 the venue was named Britain's best small music venue in a competition run by NME.

The Joiners ran a crowdfunder in 2017 to have emergency repairs covered, with a target of £7,000, it reached £9,275 in six days.

During the COVID-19 pandemic the venue was forced to close with the national lockdowns that took place over 2020 and 2021. Southampton City Council provided £25,000 in support to the venue whilst closed and Frank Turner did a livestream concert there and raised over £10,000 for the venue. Southampton rock band Creeper were one of their first set of non-socially distanced concert they organised

In November 2025, the building was purchased by Music Venue Properties, a charitable community benefit society which acts as a "supportive and benevolent landlord" for grassroots music venues.

== Notable bands that played at The Joiners ==
- 65daysofstatic
- Arctic Monkeys
- Ash
- Babybird
- Bad Manners
- Band of Skulls
- Best Coast
- Birdpen
- Blood Red Shoes
- Bob Vylan
- Bombay Bicycle Club
- Bury Tomorrow
- Cage the Elephant
- Camera Obscura
- Carter USM
- Catatonia
- Catfish and the Bottlemen
- Chapel Club
- Cherry Ghost
- Childhood
- Circa Waves
- Coldplay
- Cooper Temple Clause
- Creeper
- Dan le Sac Vs Scroobius Pip
- Dananananaykroyd
- David Gray
- Deaf Havana
- Delays
- Delirium
- Delphic
- Devilish Presley
- DragonForce
- Drenge
- Echobelly
- Ed Sheeran
- Enter Shikari
- Feeder
- Fink
- First Aid Kit
- Foals
- Frank Turner
- Franz Ferdinand
- Friendly Fires
- Gorky's Zygotic Mynci
- Green Day
- Hadouken!
- Hope of the States
- Howards Alias
- Hundred Reasons
- Jamie T
- Jawbreaker
- John Otway
- Johnny Foreigner
- Kasabian
- Klaxons
- Late of the Pier
- Little Comets
- Los Campesinos!
- Lower Than Atlantis
- Lonely the Brave
- Lucy Rose
- Manic Street Preachers
- Mansun
- Mary Spender
- Melt-Banana
- Metronomy
- Million Dead
- Mogwai
- Moloko
- Muse
- My Vitriol
- Mystery Jets
- Napalm Death
- Nick Oliveri
- Niki & The Dove
- NOFX
- Oasis
- Oceansize
- Panic! at the Disco
- Paul Heaton
- Peace
- Pete Doherty
- PJ Harvey
- Placebo
- Portugal. The Man
- Primal Scream
- Radiohead
- Reuben
- Rolo Tomassi
- Sham 69
- Sisteray
- Skindred
- Skunk Anansie
- Sleaford Mods
- Sleeper
- Slow Club
- Spunge
- Super Furry Animals
- Suede
- Supergrass
- Test Icicles
- The 1975
- The Beat
- The Bluetones
- The Bouncing Souls
- The Charlatans
- The Divine Comedy
- The History of Apple Pie
- The Joy Formidable
- The Kills
- The Kooks
- The Levellers
- The Libertines
- The Maccabees
- The Men They Couldn't Hang
- The Pigeon Detectives
- The Rakes
- The Spinto Band
- The Vaccines
- The Verve
- The Wombats
- The Young Gods
- The Zutons
- These New Puritans
- Twin Atlantic
- Two Door Cinema Club
- We Are Scientists
- Wheatus
- White Lies
- Willy Mason
- You Me at Six
