= The NEON =

Cinema and music venue in Newport, Wales

Newport Odeon
- Grade II listed building
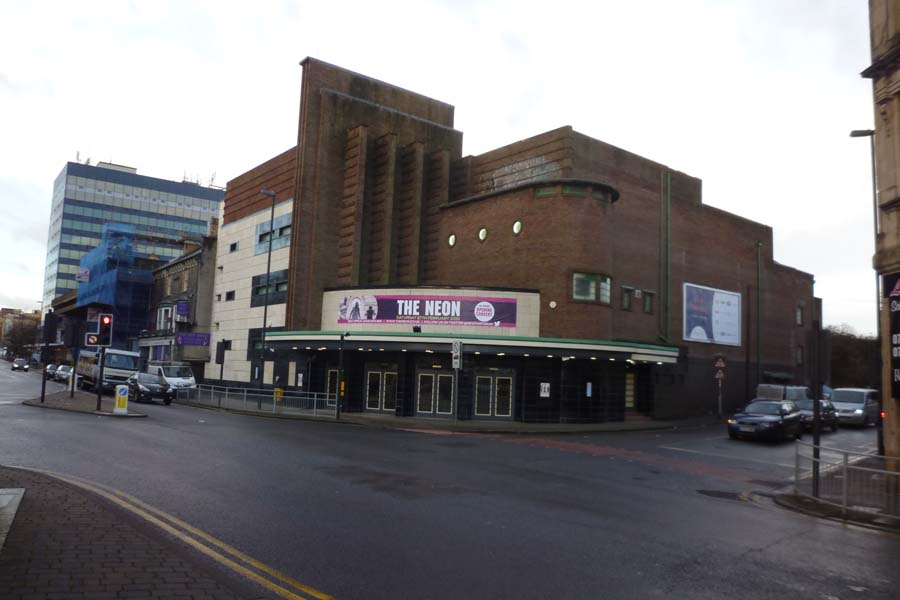
- NEON in early 2016

- Location within Wales

General information
- Architectural style: Art deco architecture
- Location: Barnardtown, Newport, Wales
- Coordinates: 51.591474°N 2.990636°W
- Completed: 1938
- Renovated: 2003
- Client: Odeon Cinemas

Design and construction
- Architect: Harry Weedon

The former Newport Odeon, which traded as an entertainment and events venue, The NEON, until 2023 is a Grade II listed building in the city of Newport, South Wales. It is located at the junction of Clarence Place and Chepstow Road on the east side of Newport city centre, near Newport Bridge. The building is one of the few true examples of Art Deco architecture in Newport.

== History ==
The NEON opened in March 1938 as an Odeon cinema, designed by Harry Weedon. The cinema closed in 1981, fell derelict in the following years and faced the possibility of demolition. It was designated a Grade II listed building in 1999. After many years of the ground floor being used as snooker hall, the building was bought by a local business-owning couple in 2003 and was transformed at a cost of over £1 million and renamed Newport City Live Arena. Features included a huge television screen to show live sporting events and a stage that hosted several famous music acts.

The building was sold, redeveloped and opened in February 2016 as a live music and vintage movie venue and named The NEON (Newport Entertains Our Nation). The name is a play on the original Odeon name (Oscar Deutsch Entertains Our Nation). The business is owned and run by businessmen Ian Gilland and Andrew James Byers. In 2019, the venue sold out to over 1,000 people for a rally of the Brexit Party, with figures including Nigel Farage, Ann Widdecombe, Nathan Gill and James Wells speaking to supporters ahead of the 2019 European Parliament elections. In December 2023 the venue was closed and its alcohol sales licence revoked after police identified a large cannabis farm operating in the building. It re-opened in May 2024 as a Professional Wrestling academy.

== See also ==
- Odeon Newport, history at cinematreasures
