= Caerleon Arts Festival =

Annual festival in Wales

Caerleon Arts Festival Gwyl Celf Caerllion
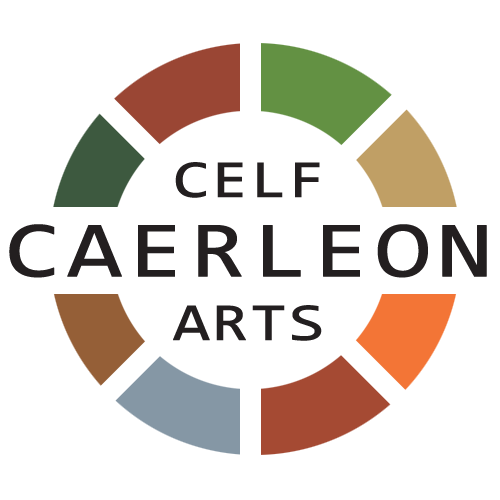
- Caerleon Celf Arts Festival logo

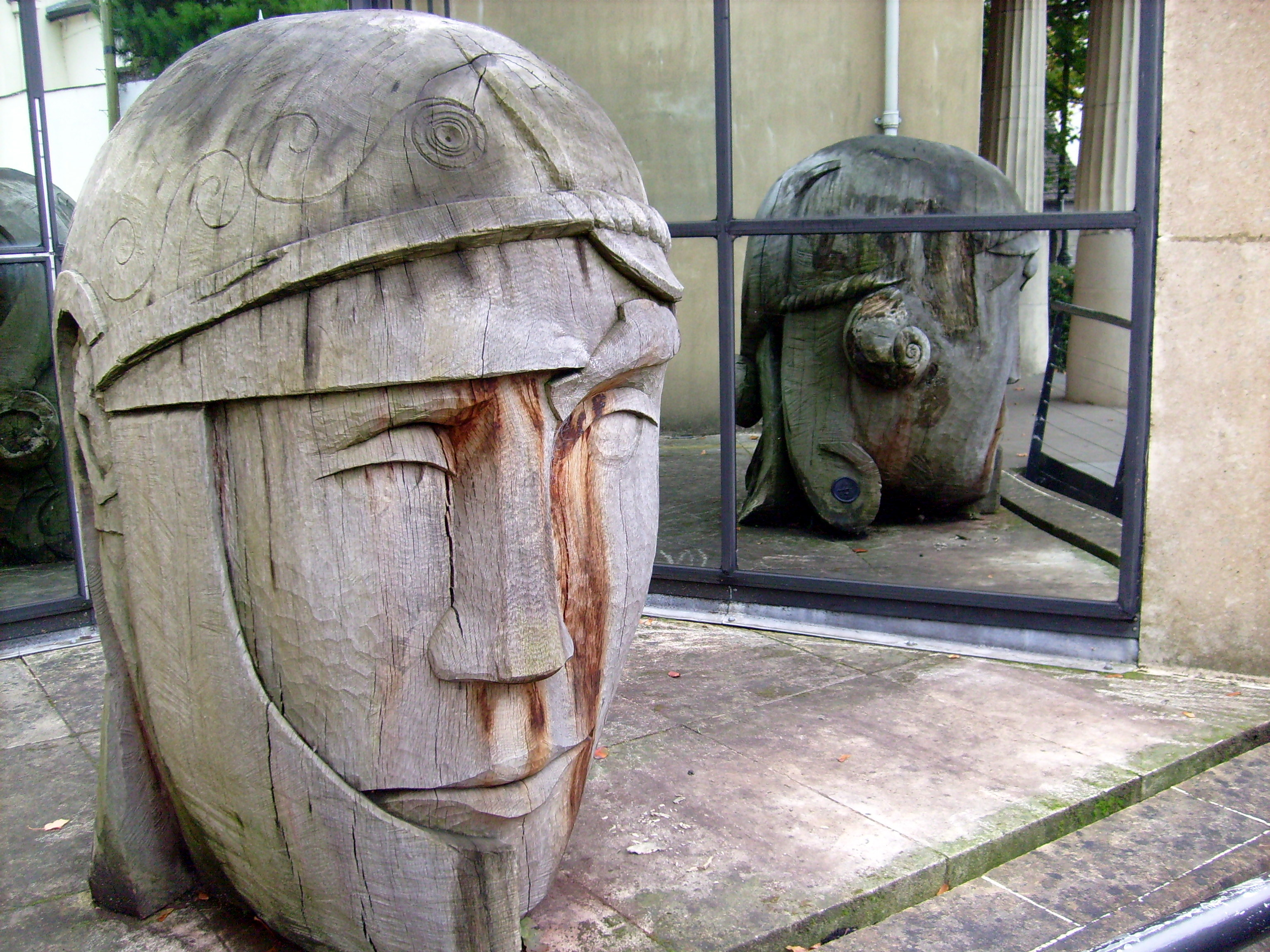
- Philip Bews' Roman Centurion sculpture from the 2003 festival
- Genre: Arts, music, and literature
- Frequency: Annually
- Location: Caerleon
- Country: Wales
- Founded: 2003 (23 years ago)
- Founder: Dr Russell Rhys
- Website: www.caerleon-arts.org

Caerleon Arts Festival
- Location within Wales

General information
- Location: Wales
- Coordinates: 51.609445°N 2.951748°W

The Caerleon Arts Festival (Welsh: Gwyl Celf Caerllion) is a yearly arts, literature and entertainment event in the town of Caerleon, near Newport, Wales. It is held in July, setting up over a week period, with a main weekend hosting the headline events. The 2019 festival concluded on 13 and 14 July.

== History ==
The festival was founded in 2003 by Dr Russell Rhys, a local GP. Born in Llanelli, he was part of the Welsh émigrés in London and was a friend of Dylan Thomas. He later joined Gwent County Council and befriended the late Newport West MP Paul Flynn.

Dr Rhys resided at the Mynde, and later went on to acquire the site for the now-Ffwrrm opposite his home. The Ffwrrm today is a garden square with a restaurant, small businesses and artists. The courtyard garden is decorated in statuary and sculptures bought and commissioned by Dr Rhys from 1990 onwards in order to create a centre for the arts in Caerleon. The collection he curated went on to become the inspiration for the Arts Festival.

== Establishment ==
Dr Rhys acquired old stables and buildings on the site of the present Ffwrwm arts centre. The site remains a cultural centre today, set in 18th century gardens. The site includes a Celtic Arts & Crafts store, sculpture garden, independent restaurant, and a number of small businesses.

In 2003 he started the Caerleon Festival, inspired by Hay-on-Wye, and he was responsible for commissioning the sculptural works. Wood workers were invited from as far as China, expenses paid, but required to preserve their work in the village. Today Caerleon and the nearby area are surrounded by mythical-styled wood sculptures, depicting such ideas as Arthurian knights of the Round Table or Welsh Mabinogion. Today there are over 100 works, many by Welsh artist Ed Harrison.

== Modern day ==
The present day festival continues the tradition of arts, crafts, and sculpture set by Dr Rhys, but now expands to include music, literature, dance and entertainment. It regularly invites musicians from other countries to perform.

Recent developments with the festival have seen expansion with music events staged at venues including Caerleon Town Hall and St Cadocs Church. The open-air Roman amphitheatre hosts an annual Shakespeare play.

The 'Big Free Weekend' alongside the River Usk is two full days of free live music and dance on three stages at the Hanbury Quay, the 17th century Bell Inn marquee and the Festival Field marquee. A diverse range of performers are featured including folk, idie, rock, choirs, celtic and international dance.

The Literature on the Lawn festival is the 'fringe' literary festival, held in the garden of the Priory Hotel. It offers literary discussions, readings, and entertainment, hosted around 5-8 July each year prior to the arts festival.

== Supporters ==
The event is supported by the local Caerleon Festival charity and its members, as well as a wide range of local businesses, including Literature Wales, ABP, Cadw, Sainsbury's, The Celtic Manor Resort, Brains Brewery, and Welsh Government.

== See also ==
- Welsh Art
- Art of the United Kingdom
- Culture of Wales
- Caerleon
