= 2012 in Wales =

- Centuries: 19th; 20th; 21st
- Decades: 1990s; 2000s; 2010s; 2020s
- See also: List of years in Wales; Timeline of Welsh history 2012 in The United Kingdom England Scotland Elsewhere Welsh football: 2011–12

This article is about the particular significance of the year 2012 to Wales and its people.

== Incumbents ==
- First Minister – Carwyn Jones
- Secretary of State for Wales – Cheryl Gillan
- Archbishop of Wales – Barry Morgan, Bishop of Llandaff
- Archdruid of the National Eisteddfod of Wales – Jim Parc Nest

== Events ==
=== January ===
- 1 January – Welsh recipients of New Year Honours include musician Walford Hutchings, rugby player Martyn Williams and politician Alex Carlile.
- 12 January – Controversial proposals for a new school "banding" system are unveiled by Assembly minister Leighton Andrews.
- 19 January – 249 staff at the Cardiff HQ of Peacocks are made redundant as the company goes into administration.
- 27 January – It is revealed that the missing documents which caused the collapse of the Lynette White police corruption trial in November 2011 have been found.
- 30 January – The inquest into the death of former Wales football manager Gary Speed returns a "narrative verdict".

=== February ===
- 9 February – All Wales Ethnic Minority Association—a Swansea-based charity whose role was to distribute funds to ethnic minority projects across Wales—loses all National Assembly funding after a damning report identified "fundamental failures in the control and governance" within the charity.
- 29 February – Plaid Cymru MP Elfyn Llwyd calls for England to pay a financial charge for receiving water from Wales.

=== March ===
- 1 March – As part of Saint David's Day celebrations, the Welsh Assembly announces that the home of poet Hedd Wyn has been secured for the nation by the Snowdonia National Park Authority.
- 12 March – Roath Lock, the new BBC Wales television production studio in Cardiff Bay, is officially opened.
- 14 March – St Asaph is named as one of three towns to be awarded city status in the United Kingdom as part of the celebrations for the Diamond Jubilee of Elizabeth II; letters patent granted 1 June.
- 15 March – Leanne Wood is announced as the new leader of Plaid Cymru.

=== April ===
- 3 April – Royal Navy and RAF helicopters rescue seven people from a cargo ship that has run aground near Colwyn Bay.
- 20 April – It is announced that Bryn Terfel's annual music festival will be revived in July 2012, taking place at London's Southbank Centre.
- 26 April – The Queen starts a two-day visit to Wales as part of her Diamond Jubilee tour. The communities visited over the Welsh section of her tour included Cardiff, Llandaff, Merthyr Tydfil, Aberfan, Ebbw Vale and Crickhowell.

=== May ===
- 3 / 4 May – In local elections the Labour Party take control of 10 of the 21 contested Welsh local authorities, a gain of 8.
- 4 / 9 May – Urdd Gobaith Cymru holds its annual eisteddfod in Snowdonia (Eryri).
- 5 May - Wales Coast Path officially launched.
- 8 May – Backing is given to construct the highest-generating onshore wind farm in Wales, located above the village of Glyncorrwg.
- 14 May – Peter Hain, former Secretary of State for Wales and Shadow Secretary of State for Wales, resigns from front-line politics.
- 19 May – Official MonmouthpediA opening.
- 25 May – The Olympic torch starts its five-day tour of Wales, as part of the torch relay of the 2012 Summer Olympics. Gareth John, Chairman of Disability Sport Wales, becomes the first person to bring the torch onto Welsh soil.

=== June ===
- 2 / 5 June – The homecoming parade of the 1st The Queen's Dragoon Guards in Cardiff begins celebrations of the Diamond Jubilee of Queen Elizabeth II of the United Kingdom. Many Welsh towns and cities hold street parties to celebrate the Jubilee, though there is a protest from an anti-monarchist group in Cardiff.
- 4 to 9 June – Urdd National Eisteddfod held at Glynllifon, Gwynedd.
- 9 June – An evacuation exercise gets under way at Aberystwyth after holidaymakers are trapped in a flooded caravan park. Several people are airlifted to safety by the Mid and West Wales Fire and Rescue Service and Royal Air Force Sea King helicopters.
- 19 June – Betws Primary School in Bridgend is seriously damaged by a fire that breaks out in the computer block during the school day; 219 pupils are safely evacuated.
- 23 June – Christine James becomes the first woman appointed Archdruid of the National Eisteddfod of Wales.

=== July ===
- 1 July – The Warden of historic Llandovery College announces a rescue plan to enable the school to continue to function despite debts of more than £2m.
- 5 July – The British Government announces plans to disband the 2nd Battalion, The Royal Welsh as part of cuts to the British Army.
- 16 July – Data from the 2011 Census is released, showing the population of Wales has risen by 5% from 2,903,085 to 3,064,000 since 2001. The Census also shows the population of Cardiff has risen by 12%.
- 24 July – Cadw acquires an 1854 miner's cottage in Cwmdare near Aberdare. The cottage is the youngest of the 128 buildings under Cadw's care.
- 25 July – The first events of the 2012 Summer Olympics are held in Cardiff. Two matches in the women's football competition are held at the Millennium Stadium.

=== August ===
- 3 August – Only Men Aloud! headline the opening concert of the 2012 National Eisteddfod of Wales at Llandow in the Vale of Glamorgan.
- 22 August – A group of scouts light the Paralympic flame on top of Snowdon, to be taken to Cardiff as part of the celebrations leading up to the start of the 2012 Summer Paralympics.

=== September ===
- 4 September – David Jones replaces Cheryl Gillan as Secretary of State for Wales in the UK government of David Cameron.
- 10 September – Wales education minister, Leighton Andrews announces the regrading of hundreds of English GCSE papers, in a break from his English counterparts, who have refused to intervene.

=== October ===
- 1 October – A large-scale search operation begins as 5-year-old April Jones disappears while playing near her home in Machynlleth.
- 15 October – Welsh National Opera reveal that they have received a donation of £1.2m from the Getty family, to help fund the production of several modern works, including Usher House by Gordon Getty.

=== November ===
- 2 November – In the wake of the Jimmy Savile sexual abuse scandal, BBC2 political programme Newsnight interview Steve Messham, a victim of the North Wales child abuse scandal. He incorrectly accuses a Thatcher-era Conservative politician of abusing him while he was in care. The fallout is severe for the BBC and also sees calls for a new policy inquiry into the original abuse case.
- 12 November
  - The National Assembly for Wales (Official Languages) Act 2012 receives royal assent. It is the first act passed in Wales to become law in over 600 years. and is also the first bill passed by the Welsh assembly since it acquired direct law-making powers in March 2011. The bill gives the Welsh and English languages equal status in the assembly.
  - TV presenter Anna Ryder Richardson is cleared of blame for an accident that occurred at her wildlife park in Tenby during August 2010; her husband, Colin MacDougall, is found guilty of breaches of health and safety legislation.
- 15 November – The first national election to elect regional Police and Crime Commissioners for Wales is met with apathy, with only 344,213 people, a turnout of 14.9%, exercising their right to vote.
- 19 November – The Silk Commission recommends that the Welsh Government should have the power to vary Income Tax in Wales by 2020.
- 21 November – A legal challenge by Jonathan Swift, QC for the Attorney General, to a Welsh Assembly bill that would reform local government bye-laws, is overturned by the Supreme Court in London. This is the first time the National Assembly has seen one of its bills adjudicated by the Supreme Court.
- 25 November – It is announced that the Venerable Janet Henderson will become the next Dean of Llandaff after John Thomas Lewis retired in July. Henderson will become the first female priest to hold the post.
- 27 November – Hundreds of homes in St Asaph are flooded when the river Elwy burst its banks after heavy rainfall.

=== December ===
- 3 December
  - It is announced that Catherine, Duchess of Cambridge, is expecting a baby; it will be the Prince of Wales's first grandchild.
- 11 December – Further data is released from the 2011 Census, it reveals several key facts about Wales:
  - Two thirds of people living in Wales identified themselves as Welsh rather than British or another nationality. The local authority with the highest self-identification as Welsh was Rhondda Cynon Taf (73%).
  - The Census reveals that for every twenty people living in Wales, roughly 15 would have been born in Wales, 4 in neighbouring England and 1 from elsewhere.
  - Those in Wales identifying their religion as Christianity fell to 58% (1.8m) a 14% drop since 2001, a larger decline than any English region.
  - The number of people self-identifying themselves as Welsh speaking has dropped from 21% to 19% in the ten years between the two census, with only Gwynedd and Anglesey recording a Welsh language rate greater than 50%. One theory behind the drop in the statistics suggests that parents misidentify the ability of their children while at school.
- 13 December – The rights to the 1972 film version of Under Milk Wood, which starred Richard Burton and Elizabeth Taylor, are gifted to Wales by its director, Andrew Sinclair.
- 14 December – It is announced that Charles, Prince of Wales is to become the patron of the festival to celebrate the centenary of the birth of Welsh poet Dylan Thomas.
- 19 December – Cardiff Magistrates’ Court charges rock star Ian Watkins and two other female accomplices with six sexual offences against children, one charge included the conspiracy to rape a one-year-old girl.
- 23 December – Heavy rain and flooding cause disruption across the country, affecting rail services and main roads.
- 29 December
  - S4C agree a new broadcasting deal with a breakaway group of more than 300 Welsh musicians and composers. The group, now represented by the Eos agency, left the Performing Rights Society in August after PRS reclassified BBC Radio Cymru as a regional rather than a national radio station.
  - In the 2013 New Year Honours List, Welsh recipients include Dave Brailsford (knighthood), Roger Williams MP (CBE) and Susan Davies, head of Cynffig Comprehensive School (OBE).

== Arts and culture ==
=== Welsh Awards ===
- Glyndŵr Award
- National Eisteddfod of Wales: Chair – Dylan Iorwerth
- National Eisteddfod of Wales: Crown – Gwyneth Lewis
- Gwobr Goffa Daniel Owen: Robat Gruffudd
- Wales Book of the Year:
  - English language: Patrick McGuinness The Last Hundred Days (Seren)
  - Welsh language: Jon Gower, Y Storiwr (Gomer)
- Dylan Thomas Prize: Maggie Shipstead, Seating Arrangements
- Kyffin Art Prize: Chloe Holt – Beina
- Urdd National Eisteddfod: Crown - Anni Llŷn
- Urdd National Eisteddfod: Chair - Gruffudd Antur

=== Welsh winners of international awards ===
- Jo Walton wins both the 2012 Hugo Award for Best Novel and Nebula Award for Best Novel with her 2011 book Among Others.

=== New books ===
==== In the Welsh language ====
Fiction

- Jerry Hunter – Gwreiddyn Chwerw
- Mihangel Morgan – Pantglas
- Dewi Prysor – Cig a Gwaed
- Manon Steffan Ros – Blasu
- Sara Maria Saunders (S.M.S.) – Llon a Lleddf a Storïau Eraill

Autobiography

- Elinor Bennett - Tannau Tynion (Taut Strings)
- Gwyn Elfyn – Gwyn y Mans – Hunangofiant Gwyn Elfyn
- Elystan Morgan – Elystan – Atgofion Oes

==== In the English language ====
Fiction

- Ken Follett – Winter of the World

Poetry

- Gillian Clarke – Ice

=== Plays ===
- Bethan Marlow – Sgint

=== Music ===
==== Awards ====
- Welsh Music Prize – Future of the Left, The Plot Against Common Sense

==== Classical ====
- Karl Jenkins – The Peacemakers
- Guto Puw
  - Digwyddiad Sugnwr Llwch
  - Naid Sgi

==== Albums ====
- Bright Light Bright Light – Make Me Believe in Hope
- Euros Childs – Summer Special
- Clinigol – Discopolis
- Colorama – Good Music
- Fist of the First Man – Fist of the First Man
- Future of the Left – The Plot Against Common Sense
- Islet – Illuminated People
- Cate Le Bon – CYRK
- Cowbois Rhos Botwnnog – Draw Dros y Mynydd
- Huw M – Gathering Dusk
- Jodie Marie – Mountain Echo
- Marina and the Diamonds – Electra Heart
- Race Horses – Furniture
- Tom Jones – Spirit in the Room
- Trwbador – Trwbador

== Film ==
- The Raid: Redemption – directed by Indonesia-based Welsh director Gareth Evans
- Vinyl – directed by Sara Sugarman and starring Keith Allen, based on the story of the hoax single released by Mike Peters under the guise of a younger band in 2004.

== Broadcasting ==
=== Welsh-language television ===
- Dos i Gwcio (cookery programme)

=== English-language television ===
- Stella – a comedy drama written by and starring Ruth Jones filmed on location in the Rhondda Valley.
- The Story of Wales – A major BBC History programme presented by Huw Edwards.
- The Indian Doctor – (second series), set and filmed in Wales.
- Being Human – (fourth series), set in Barry, Vale of Glamorgan and filmed in Wales
- Upstairs Downstairs – (second series), filmed in Wales, produced by BBC Wales and directed by Euros Lyn.
- Wizards vs Aliens

=== English-language radio ===
- Olympic Dragons

== Sport ==
- 2012 BBC Wales Sports Personality of the Year – Jade Jones, Olympic taekwondo gold medalist
- Athletics
  - 10 May – Helen Jenkins wins the ITU World Triathlon Series in San Diego.
  - 29 June – Rhys Williams wins gold in the 400m hurdles at the 2012 European Athletics Championships in Helsinki.
  - 13 October – Leanda Cave wins the female competition of the 2012 Ironman World Championship in Hawaii.
  - 31 December – Olympian Dai Greene and Paralympian Samantha Bowen are the mystery runners at the 2012 Nos Galan road race.
- Bowls
  - 29 January – Wales' Jason Greenslade is beaten by Andy Thompson in the final of the 2012 World Indoor Bowls Championship.
- Boxing
  - 25 February – Nathan Cleverly beats Tommy Karpency to retain his WBO light-heavyweight title.
  - 7 July – Gavin Rees retains his European lightweight belt and wins the British lightweight title after defeating Derry Mathews in Sheffield.
  - 11 November – Nathan Cleverly successfully defends his WBO light-heavyweight title for the fourth time, in an eighth round stoppage over Shawn Hawk in Los Angeles.
  - 24 November – The British Lionhearts compete in their first ever home round of the World Series Boxing competition, which was held at the Celtic Manor Resort in Newport. The five-man team, which beat reigning champions Italia Thunder, contained Welsh boxers Fred Evans and Andrew Selby.
- Darts
  - Tony Bradley (men's) of Wales and Deta Hedman (women's) of England are champions at the Welsh Open.
- Football
  - 19 January – Chris Coleman is appointed as the manager of the Wales national team.
  - 26 February – Cardiff City are beaten by Liverpool in the 2012 Football League Cup Final, the game ending on penalties when the score finished 2–2 after extra time.
  - 21 April – The New Saints F.C. win the 2011–12 Welsh Premier League.
  - 28 April – Cardiff City finish 6th in the 2011–12 Football League Championship, booking a play-off place for the final promotion slot to the Premiership.
  - 5 May – The New Saints F.C. win the 125th Welsh Cup, beating Cefn Druids A.F.C. 2–0 in the final.
  - 12 May – Newport County A.F.C. lose 2–0 to York City F.C. in the FA Trophy final. It is the first time Newport County have ever played at Wembley Stadium.
  - 13 May – Swansea City A.F.C. beat Liverpool 1–0 at home, to finish 11th in their first season in the Premier League.
  - 16 October – Wales defeat Scotland 2–1 in the first round of qualification for the 2014 FIFA World Cup. It is the team's first win since the death of Gary Speed.
- Golf
  - 3 June – Thongchai Jaidee wins the 2012 Wales Open.
  - 1 July – Jamie Donaldson takes his first European Tour title after winning the Irish Open.
- Horse Racing
  - 24 December – The Welsh National, due to take place at Chepstow Racecourse on 27 December, is abandoned due to a waterlogged track. It is re-arranged to early January.
- Rugby union
  - 25 February – In the 2012 Six Nations Championship, Wales beat England at Twickenham to take their 20th Triple Crown.
  - 17 March – Wales defeat France at the Millennium Stadium to win the 2012 Six Nations Championship and Grand Slam.
  - 11 April – It is reported that Wales rugby coach Warren Gatland has broken both heels in a fall from a ladder while cleaning windows at his beach house in New Zealand.
  - 20 April – Rob Howley is appointed caretaker manager of the Wales national rugby side.
  - 28 April – Pontypridd win the 2011–12 Principality Premiership title, their first win since the 1996–97 season.
  - 6 May – Wales are beaten by Samoa in the plate final of the 2012 Scotland Sevens.
  - 7 May – Cross Keys win their first major trophy when they beat Pontypridd to lift the 2012 Swalec Cup. The competition also saw Penallta RFC win the Challenge Plate final while Glyncoch RFC won the Challenge Bowl.
  - 23 June – Wales lose the third of their 3-match test series in their 2012 Summer Tour of Australia; Australia take the series 3–0.
  - 3 December – After losing all four of their autumn international matches, Wales drop out of the top eight seeds, resulting in the side being placed in the third tier for the 2015 Rugby World Cup draw. In the draw Wales were placed in group A along with Australia and England; the final slots being filled through qualifiers.
  - 5 December – The Welsh Rugby Union creates the Professional Regional Game Board in an attempt to restructure the finances of regional rugby in Wales. Its chair is Mr Justice Wyn Williams.
- Snooker
  - 19 February – Ding Junhui wins the 2012 Welsh Open by defeating Mark Selby 9–6 in the final.
  - 5 May – Matthew Stevens is beaten in the semi-finals by Ronnie O'Sullivan in the 2012 World Snooker Championship.

=== 2012 Summer Olympics ===
Welsh medallists at the 2012 Summer Paralympics
Medal	Name(s)	Sport and event	date
Gold	Geraint Thomas	Track Cycling – Men's team pursuit	3 August 2012.
Gold	Tom James	Rowing – Men's coxless four	4 August 2012
Gold	Jade Jones	Taekwondo – Women's 57 kg	9 August 2012
Silver	Chris Bartley	Rowing – Men's lightweight coxless four	2 August 2012
Silver	Hannah Mills	Sailing – Women's 470 class	10 August 2012
Silver	Fred Evans	Boxing – Men's welterweight	12 August 2012
Bronze	Sarah Thomas	Hockey – Women's tournament	10 August 2012

=== 2012 Summer Paralympics ===
Welsh medallists at the 2012 Summer Olympics
Medal	Name(s)	Sport and event	date
Gold	Mark Colbourne	Cycling – Men's individual pursuit C1	31 August
Gold	Aled Davies	Athletics – Men's discus throw	2 September
Silver	Mark Colbourne	Cycling – Men's 1km time trial C1-2-3	30 August
Silver	Nyree Kindred	Swimming – Women's 100 metre backstroke S6	30 August
Silver	Mark Colbourne	Cycling – Men's road time trial C1	5 September
Bronze	Aled Davies	Athletics – Men's shot put	31 August
Bronze	Claire Williams	Athletics – Women's Discus Throw – F11/12	1 September
Bronze	Paul Davies	Table tennis – Men's individual – Class 1	3 September
Bronze	Liz Johnson	Swimming – Women's 100 metre breaststroke SB6	5 September
Bronze	Beverley Jones	Athletics – Women's Discus F37	6 September
Bronze	Sara Head	Table tennis – Women's team – Class 1–3	7 September

== Deaths ==
- 5 January – Idwal Fisher, rugby player, 76
- 6 January – Clive Shell, rugby player, 64
- 8 January
  - Brian Curvis, boxer, 74
  - Graham Rathbone, footballer, 69
- 11 January – Ivor Rees, former Bishop of St David's, 85
- 13 January – Dilys Elwyn Edwards, composer, 93
- 31 January – Mikel Japp, musician and songwriter, 59
- 18 February – Peter Halliday, actor, 87
- 21 February – Emlyn Hooson, Baron Hooson, politician, 86
- 5 March – Philip Madoc, actor, 77
- 15 March – Mervyn Davies, rugby union player, 65
- 30 March – Emrys Roberts, poet and author, Archdruid of Wales 1987–1990, 82
- 1 April – Giorgio Chinaglia, Swansea and Cardiff footballer, 65
- 9 April – Malcolm Thomas, Wales international rugby union player, 82
- 14 April – Eddie May, English footballer, former captain of Wrexham FC and manager of Cardiff City F.C., 68
- 13 May – Jean McFarlane, Baroness McFarlane of Llandaff, nurse and member of the House of Lords, 86
- 26 May – Stephen Healey, soldier and former professional footballer, 29 (killed on active service in Afghanistan)
- 17 June – Brian Hibbard, actor and singer, 65 (cancer)
- 18 June
  - Tom Maynard, cricketer, 23
  - Victor Spinetti, actor, 82
- 20 June – Emrys Jones, literary scholar, 81
- 9 July – Brian Thomas, rugby union international and coach, 72
- 18 July – Jack Matthews, rugby union international and medical officer, 91
- 21 July – Angharad Rees, actress, 63
- 13 August – Eileen Beasley, Welsh language campaigner, 91
- 20 August – Lucy Dickenson, charity founder, 32
- 4 September – Ian Parrott, composer and music writer, 96
- 18 September – Malcolm Struel, former Chairman of Swansea City Football Club, 78
- 3 October – Billy Hullin, Welsh rugby player, 70
- 19 October – Charles Rutter, Cardiff City football player, 84
- 6 November – Ivor Powell, footballer and coach, 95
- 18 November – Kenny Morgans, footballer and survivor of the Munich air disaster, 73
- 19 November – John Hefin, TV producer and head of Drama at BBC Wales, 71
- 14 December – Rick Wright, former chairman of Cardiff City F.C., 81

== See also ==
- 2012 in Northern Ireland
