= Welsh Music Prize =

Musical award

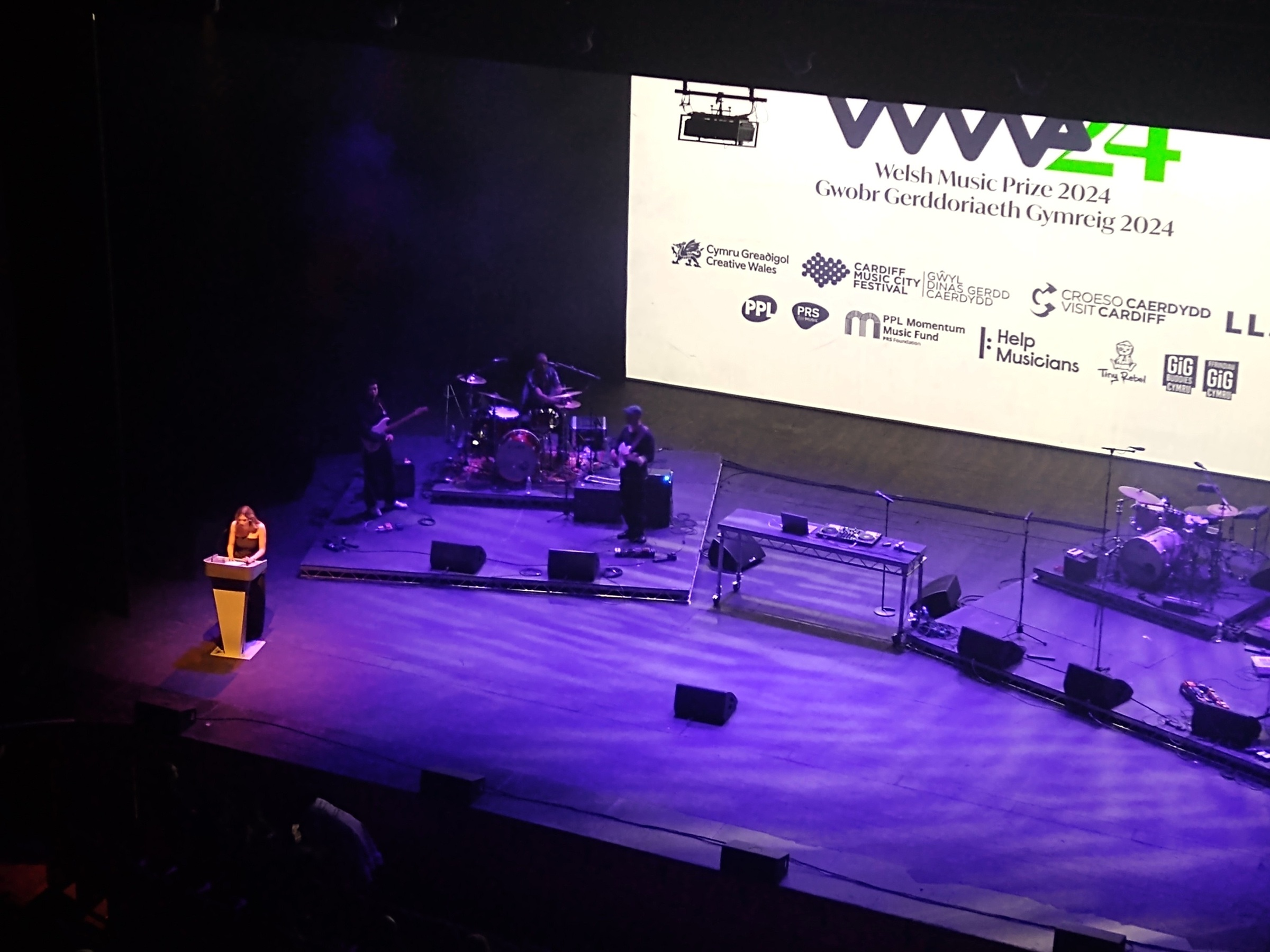
2024 Welsh Music Prize event taking place in the Wales Millennium Centre, Cardiff

The Welsh Music Prize (Welsh: Gwobr Gerddoriaeth Gymreig) is an annual music prize awarded for the best album from Wales, as voted for by members of the music industry based on artistic merit, regardless of genre, sales, or record label. It was founded by music promoter John Rostron and radio presenter Huw Stephens in 2011. It was originally scheduled to take place alongside Sŵn music festival in Cardiff but sometimes takes place later in the year.

Prior to the awards, Welsh TV Show The Pop Factory held its own award ceremony between 2003 and 2007. From 2004 onwards the Best Album category was won by a Welsh artist, therefore allowing this to be seen as a spiritual pre-successor of the awards, although this was by a public vote and not a judging panel. Prior to this, the short-lived Welsh Music Awards between 2001 and 2004 also had a Best Album category, with the 2005 Pop Factory Awards only nominating Welsh artists, possibly in response to the awards ceasing.

== Eligibility criteria ==
The long list and short list is chosen each year from new albums of original, previously unreleased work, that have been made available for the first time during the 12 months up to 31 July each year. The artist, or at least 50% of a group's core members, must be born in Wales. Alternatively the artist or group must have had their creative base in Wales for at least 3 years.

== Winners and shortlisted nominees ==
| Year | Shortlisted nominees - Winner in BOLD | NOTES |
|---|---|---|
| 2011 | Al Lewis – In the Wake; Colorama – Box; **Gruff Rhys – Hotel Shampoo**; Lleuwen Steffan – Tân; Manic Street Preachers – Postcards from a Young Man; Stagga – The Warm Air Room; Sweet Baboo – I'm a Dancer/Songs About Sleepin'; The Blackout – Hope; The Gentle Good – Tethered for the Storm; The Joy Formidable – The Big Roar; Y Niwl – Y Niwl; Funeral for a Friend – Welcome Home Armageddon | INAUGURAL EVENT |
| 2012 | Bright Light Bright Light – Make Me Believe in Hope; Cate Le Bon – Cyrk; Cowbois Rhos Botwnnog – Draw Dros Y Mynydd; Exit International – Black Junk; **Future of the Left – The Plot Against Common Sense**; Huw M – Gathering Dusk; Islet – Illuminated People; Jodie Marie – Mountain Echo; Kids in Glass Houses – In Gold Blood; Kutosis – Fanatical Love; Los Campesinos! – Hello Sadness; Truckers of Husk – Accelerated Learning | |
| 2013 | Euros Childs – Summer Special; Fist of the First Man – Fist of the First Man; **Georgia Ruth – Week of Pines**; Laurence Made Me Cry – The Diary of Me; Little Arrow – Wild Wishes; Metabeats – Caviar Crackle; Neon Neon – Praxis Makes Perfect; Race Horses – Furniture; Sweet Baboo – Ships; Trwbador – Trwbador; Winter Villains – February; Zervas and Pepper – Lifebringer | |
| 2014 | 9 Bach – Tincian; Cate Le Bon – Mug Museum; Euros Childs – Situation Comedy; Future of the Left – How to Stop Your Brain in an Accident; Gruff Rhys – American Interior; Gulp – Season Sun; **Joanna Gruesome – Weird Sister**; Manic Street Preachers – Futurology; Samoans – Rescue; Slowly Rolling Camera – Slowly Rolling Camera; The Gentle Good – Y Bardd Anfarwol; The People The Poet – The Narrator | |
| 2015 | Calan – Dinas; Catfish and the Bottlemen – The Balcony; Geraint Jarman – Dwyn yr Hogyn Nol; **Gwenno – Y Dydd Olaf**; H. Hawkline – In the Pink of Condition; Hippies vs Ghosts – Droogs; Houdini Dax – Naughty Nation; Joanna Gruesome – Peanut Butter; Keys – Ring the Changes; Paper Aeroplanes – Joy; Richard James – All the New Highways; Tender Prey – Organ Calzone; Trwbador – Several Wolves; Zarelli – Soft Rains; Zefur Wolves – Zefur Wolves | |
| 2016 | 9Bach – Anian; Alun Gaffey – Alun Gaffey; Cate Le Bon – Crab Day; Climbing Trees – Borders; Datblygu – Porwr Trallod; Plu – Tir a Golau; **Meilyr Jones – 2013**; Right Hand Left Hand – Right Hand Left Hand; Simon Love – It Seemed Like a Good Idea at the Time; Skindred – Volume; Sŵnami – Sŵnami; The Anchoress – Confessions of a Romance Novelist | |
| 2017 | Baby Queens – Baby Queens; Bendith (Plu and Colorama) – Bendith; Cotton Wolf – Life in Analogue; H. Hawkline – I Romanticize; Toby Hay – The Gathering; HMS Morris – Interior Design; Mammoth Weed Wizard Bastard – Y Proffwyd Dwyll; Kelly Lee Owens – Kelly Lee Owens; Gruff Rhys – Set Fire to the Stars; Georgia Ruth – Fossil Scale; Sweet Baboo – Wild Imagination; **The Gentle Good – Ruins/Adfeilion** | |
| 2018 | Alex Dingley – Beat the Babble; Astroid Boys – Broke; **Boy Azooga – 1, 2, Kung Fu!**; Bryde – Like an Island; Catrin Finch & Seckou Keita – Soar; Eugene Capper & Rhodri Brooks – Pontvane; Gwenno – Le Kov; Gruff Rhys – Babelsberg; Manic Street Preachers – Resistance Is Futile; Mellt – Mae'n Hawdd Pan Ti'n Ifanc; Seazoo – Trunks; Toby Hay – The Longest Day | |
| 2019 | Accü – Echo the Red; **Adwaith – Melyn**; Audiobooks – Now! (in a minute); Carwyn Ellis & Rio 18 – Joia!; Cate Le Bon – Reward; Deyah – Lover Loner; Estrons – You Say I'm Too Much I Say You're Not Enough; HMS Morris – Inspirational Talks; Lleuwen – Gwn Glân Beibl Budr; Lucas J Rowe – Touchy Love; Mr – Oesoedd; Vrï – Tŷ Ein Tadau | |
| 2020 | Ani Glass – Mirores; Colorama – Chaos Wonderland; Cotton Wolf – Ofni; **Deyah – Care City**; Don Leisure – Steel Zakuski; Georgia Ruth – Mai'; Gruff Rhys – Pang!; Islet – Eyelet; Keys – Bring Me The Head Of Jerry Garcia; Kidsmoke - A Vision In The Dark; Los Blancos – Sbwriel Gwyn; Luke RV – Valley Boy; Right Hand Left Hand – Zone Rouge; Silent Forum - Everything Solved At Once; Yr Ods – Iaith y Nefoedd | |
| 2021 | Afro Cluster – The Reach; The Anchoress – The Art Of Losing; Carwyn Ellis & Rio 18 – Mas; Datblygu – Cwm Gwagle; El Goodo – Zombie; Gruff Rhys – Seeking New Gods; Gwenifer Raymond – Strange Lights Over Garth Mountain; **Kelly Lee Owens – Inner Song**; Mace The Great – My Side Of The Bridge; Novo Amor – Cannot Be, Whatsover; Private World – Aleph; Pys Melyn – Bywyd Llonydd | |
| 2022 | **Adwaith – Bato Mato**; Art School Girlfriend – Is It Light Where You Are; Breichiau Hir – Hir Oes I'r Cof; Bryde – Still; Buzzard Buzzard Buzzard – Backhand Deals; Carwyn Ellis & Rio 18 with the BBC National Orchestra of Wales – Yn Rio; Cate Le Bon – Pompeii; Danielle Lewis – Dreaming in Slow Motion; Dead Method – Future Femme; Don Leisure – Shaboo Strikes Back; Gwenno – Tresor; L E M F R E C K – The Pursuit; Manic Street Preachers – The Ultra Vivid Lament; Papur Wal – Amser Mynd Adra; Sywel Nyw – Deuddeg | |
| 2023 | Cerys Hafana – Edyf; CVC – Get Real; Dafydd Owain – Uwch Dros Y Pysgod; H. Hawkline – Milk for Flowers; Hyll – Sŵn O’r Stafell Arall; Ivan Moult – Songs from Severn Grove; John Cale – Mercy; Mace the Great – SplottWorld; Minas – All My Love Has Failed Me; Overmono – Good Lies; **Rogue Jones - Dos Bebés**; Sister Wives – Y Gawres; Stella Donnelly – Flood; Sŵnami – Sŵnamii; YNYS – Ynys | |
| 2024 | Aleighcia Scott – Windrush Baby; ANGHARAD – Motherland; Buzzard Buzzard Buzzard – Skinwalker; CHROMA – Ask for Angela; Cowbois Rhos Botwnnog – Mynd â'r Tŷ Am Dro; Elkka – Prism of Pleasure; Georgia Ruth – Cool Head; Gruff Rhys – Sadness Sets Me Free; HMS Morris – Dollar Lizard Money Zombie; **L E M F R E C K – BLOOD, SWEAT & FEARS**; Mellt – Dim Dwywaith; Pys Melyn – Bolmynydd; Skindred – Smile; Slate – Deathless; YNYS – Dosbarth Nos | Ceremony date: 8 October 2024; Venue: Wales Millennium Centre Presenters: Sian Eleri, Huw Stephens |
| 2025 | Adwaith – Solas; Breichiau Hir - Y Dwylo Uwchben; Buddug - Rhwng Gwyll a Gwawr; Cerys Hafana - Difrisg (instrumental); **Don Leisure – Tyrchu Sain**; Gwenno - Utopia; Kelly Lee Owens - Dreamstate; KEYS - Acid Communism; Melin Melyn - Mill on The Hill; Panic Shack - Panic Shack; Sage Todz - Stopia Cwyno; Siula - Night Falls on the World; Tai Haf Heb Drigolyn - Ein Albwm Cyntaf Ni; The Gentle Good - Elan; The Tubs - Cotton Crown | Ceremony date: 6 October 2024; Venue: Wales Millennium Centre Presenters: Sian Eleri, Huw Stephens |

== Most-nominated artists ==
| Artist | Nominations | Winner |
|---|---|---|
| Gruff Rhys | 7 | 1 |
| Cate Le Bon | 5 | 0 |
| Georgia Ruth | 4 | 1 |
| Gwenno | 4 | 1 |
| Manic Street Preachers | 4 | 0 |
| Adwaith | 3 | 2 |
| Carwyn Ellis & Rio 18 | 3 | 0 |
| The Gentle Good | 3 | 1 |
| Sweet Baboo | 3 | 0 |
| HMS Morris | 3 | 0 |
| Kelly Lee Owens | 3 | 1 |
| Breichiau Hir | 2 | 0 |
| Bryde | 2 | 0 |
| Buzzard Buzzard Buzzard | 2 | 0 |
| Cerys Hafana | 2 | 0 |
| Cowbois Rhos Botwnnog | 2 | 0 |
| Datblygu | 2 | 0 |
| Deyah | 2 | 1 |
| Don Leisure | 2 | 0 |
| Euros Childs | 2 | 0 |
| Future of the Left | 2 | 1 |
| Islet | 2 | 0 |
| L E M F R E C K | 2 | 1 |
| Lleuwen | 2 | 0 |
| Right Hand Left Hand | 2 | 0 |
| Trwbador | 2 | 0 |
| Mellt | 2 | 0 |
| Ynys | 2 | 0 |
| Skindred | 2 | 0 |
| Pys Melyn | 2 | 0 |
