= Georgia Ruth =

Welsh musician

Georgia Ruth Williams
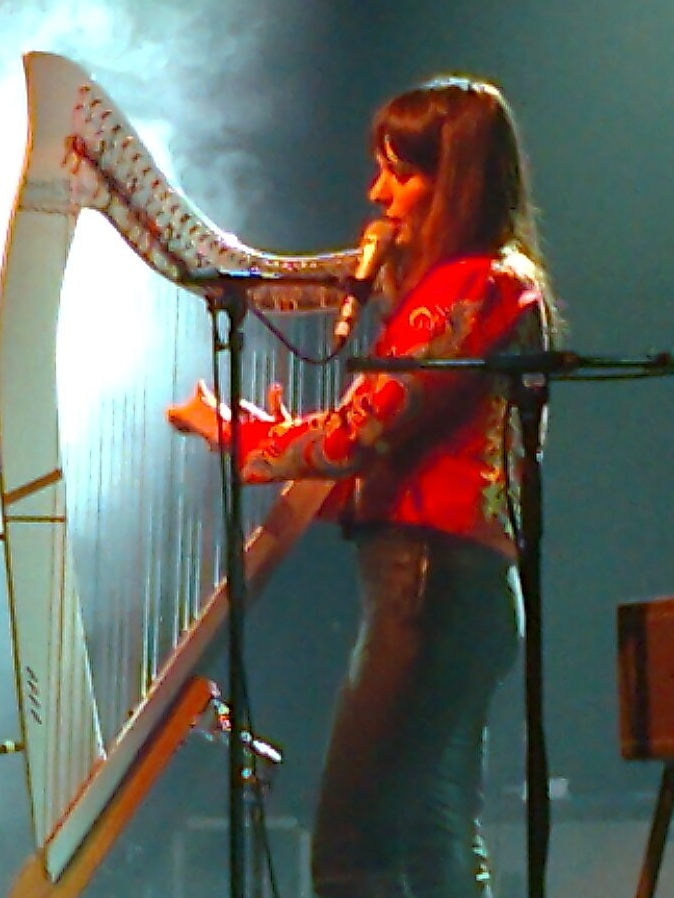
- Williams performing in 2013

Background information
- Born: 5 January 1988 (age 38); Llantwit Major, Wales
- Genres: Folk, indie pop
- Occupations: Musician, songwriter
- Instruments: Vocals, harp, keyboards
- Years active: 2008–present
- Labels: Gwymon, Bubblewrap
- Website: georgiaruth.co.uk

Georgia Ruth Williams (born 5 January 1988) is a Welsh singer-songwriter and harpist. She sings in both English and Welsh.

== Early life ==
Williams was born in Llantwit Major in South Wales. At the age of four she moved with her family to Aberystwyth, where she was educated bilingually in English and Welsh, though her parents were not Welsh speakers.

She began to learn the harp at the age of seven, and began to perform her own music whilst studying English Literature at the University of Cambridge. Her early recordings were sent to BBC Radio Wales's Adam Walton, and acclaim led to an early BBC Introducing appearance at the 2008 Glastonbury Festival.

== Career ==
Williams's first EP, In Luna, was released on limited edition 10" vinyl in 2011. It was engineered and produced by David Wrench at the Bryn Derwen Recording Studio in Snowdonia and featured Pete Richardson from Y Niwl on drums and Pete Walton on double bass.

The EP drew critical acclaim and gained radio airplay from Huw Stephens and Steve Lamacq, leading to an appearance at the 2012 Green Man Festival. She also performed at the festival several times since.

Her first album, Week of Pines, (2013) was once again produced by David Wrench and featured Dafydd Hughes, Iwan Hughes and Aled Hughes from Cowbois Rhos Botwnnog. Music from the album gained significant radio airplay from Adam Walton and Bethan Elfyn on BBC Radio Wales, Huw Stephens on BBC Radio 1, Steve Lamacq and Tom Robinson on BBC Radio 6 Music and Simon Raymonde on Amazing Radio. Additional live sessions were recorded on 6 Music with Lauren Laverne with interviews on BBC Radio Cymru.

The album was further promoted by live appearances at Festival N°6, BBC Introducing on BBC Radio 2 in Hyde Park, Latitude Festival and WOMEX. In 2014 she appeared in session for Bob Harris on BBC Radio 2 and a collaboration with Newport-based Ballet Cymru at the Riverfront Arts Centre, in which a live performance of tracks from the album was interpreted by the company's dancers.

Williams made a guest appearance on "Divine Youth" from Manic Street Preachers 2014 album Futurology. She was also involved in the Ghazalaw project with Gwyneth Glyn and Tauseef Akhtar. She features on several tracks on English folk artist Jinnwoo's 2016 debut record Strangers Bring Me No Light.

Williams's second album Fossil Scale was released in October 2016, followed by Mai in 2020.

In 2024, Williams released her fourth album Cool Head, produced by Iwan Morgan, and simultaneously her first novel, Tell Me Who I Am.

On radio, Williams has a long-running music show broadcast on BBC Radio Cymru (formerly the C2 evening strand). She has also provided cover for Bethan Elfyn on her BBC Radio Wales show.

== Awards ==
Week of Pines was awarded the 2013 Welsh Music Prize. Williams was nominated for the Horizon Music Prize in the 2014 BBC Radio 2 Folk Awards. Her second album, Fossil Scale, was nominated for the Welsh Music Prize in 2017; the winning album, The Gentle Good's Ruins/Adfeilion, features Williams on harp and backing vocals.

== Personal life ==
Williams is married to musician Iwan Hughes (Huws) from Cowbois Rhos Botwnnog. They share their time between Cardiff and Caernarfon and have three children.

Williams has expressed support for Welsh independence. She said: "An independent Wales is a stronger Wales. We are brave, dynamic and innovative; we contain multitudes. If we are to have agency over our own language, our creative industries and – perhaps most urgently – our own environment and climate, we must be independent."

== Solo discography ==
=== EPs ===
- In Luna (Gwymon, 2011)
- Kingfisher (Bubblewrap, 2022)

=== Albums ===
- Week of Pines (Gwymon, 2013)
- Fossil Scale (Navigator, 2016)
- Mai (Bubblewrap, 2020)
- Cool Head (Bubblewrap, 2024)
