= The Gentle Good =

Welsh singer-songwriter (born 1981)

Gareth Bonello
- Also known as: The Gentle Good
- Born: Gareth Huw Bonello; 13 April 1981 (age 45); Cardiff, Wales
- Genres: Folk
- Occupations: Singer-songwriter, musician
- Instruments: Vocals, guitar, cello, piano
- Labels: Gwymon, Bubblewrap Records
- Website: www.thegentlegood.com

The Gentle Good is the stage name of Gareth Bonello (born 13 April 1981), a Welsh singer-songwriter and folk musician from Cardiff who performs in English and Welsh. The stage name is inspired by Bonello's, with "Gareth" traditionally meaning "Gentle" in Welsh. In addition to his own material, Bonello has had a longstanding partnership with musician Richard James and has also collaborated with other artists as a session musician.

== Career ==
Bonello started performing in Cardiff open mic nights in his early twenties and soon moved on to writing and performing his own material.

His debut EP was self-released in 2005 and titled Find Your Way Back Home. It included two English tracks and two Welsh tracks.

Bonello's first EP on a label, Dawel Disgyn, was released on Gwymon in 2007. It features Seb Goldfinch on violin, Llion Robertson on keys and Lindsey Leven (now in Gulp) on backing vocals. Robertson has also produced all of Bonello's albums to date.

Bonello's debut album While You Slept I Went Out Walking was released in 2008. Sung in both Welsh and English, it features renditions of traditional tracks and original songs. After the album's release, Bonello was invited to play at the 2008 Festival Interceltique de Lorient and as part of the Wales programme at the 2009 Smithsonian Folklife Festival. He has previously performed at the Glastonbury Festival, as part of the 2009 Emerging Talent Competition, and at the SXSW festival in Texas.

Second album Tethered for the Storm, released in 2010, included an a cappella duet with Lisa Jên Brown of Welsh-language folk band 9Bach and backing vocals from Cate Le Bon. The album featured The Mavron Quartet with string arrangements by Seb Goldfinch.

In 2011, Bonello's cover of the Pink Floyd track One of My Turns was included in the Mojo compilation The Wall Re-Built!.

In October 2011, Bonello travelled to Chengdu, China as part of The British Council's China Residencies, in collaboration with the PRS for Music Foundation. The residency at the Chengdu Associated Theatre of Performing Arts produced Bonello's third album, Y Bardd Anfarwol (The Immortal Bard), released in 2013. It was recorded both in China with local musicians and back in the UK with The Mavron Quartet, members of the UK Chinese Ensemble and contributors such as Laura J. Martin on flute and Lisa Jên, who sang lead vocals on one track. The Welsh-language project, which combines Welsh and Chinese folk traditions, is based on the life and works of Chinese poet Li Bai. In 2014 it won Best Welsh Album at the National Eisteddfod. In 2015 the play Rhith Gân by Wyn Mason, based on Y Bardd Anfarwol, won the Drama Medal at the Montgomeryshire and the Marches National Eisteddfod. The play was first staged at the 2016 Eisteddfod in Abergavenny, with Bonello serving as musical director.

In early 2014, Bonello released on Bandcamp a new EP, Plygeiniwch!, featuring traditional acoustic fingerpicking instrumentals, with all proceeds going to Macmillan Cancer Support. In 2014 he has also appeared in Cerys Matthews's S4C documentary about the history of folk music in Wales, Y Goeden Faled (The Ballad Tree).

Bonello's next album, Ruins/Adfeilion, was recorded in January 2016 and released on Bubblewrap in October 2016. Alongside regular collaborators, the album features Georgia Ruth on harp and backing vocals. The album was nominated for Welsh Language Album of the Year at the 2017 National Eisteddfod and in October that year won the Welsh Music Prize for 2016–2017.

In 2021, Bonello released Sai-thaiñ ki Sur with the Khasi-Cymru Collective, collecting music recorded with artists from the Khasi Hills in India following his researched PhD.

The Gentle Good has toured in the UK and performed solo and with a band in various festivals around Wales, including the Hay Festival, Calan Mai Folk Festival, The National Eisteddfod, Laugharne Weekend, WOMEX 2013 and Festival N°6; he has been a regular performer at the Green Man Festival. In 2015 Bonello returned to perform in Australia and India, and also took a further trip to China to perform music off his third album.

Bonello has long collaborated with musician Richard James, performing as a duo and also as guitarist in James's accompanying band. Bonello was also one of the musicians who appeared on James's 2015 album, All the New Highways, which was nominated for the 2014–2015 Welsh Music Prize.

== Personal life ==
Bonello has a degree in zoology and specialised in ornithology. In 2020 he completed a PhD at the University of South Wales, "Welsh and Khasi Cultural Dialogues: Research through Creative Practice". Alongside music, he worked with the British Trust for Ornithology and from 2007 until 2015 with Amgueddfa Cymru – National Museum Wales at St Fagans National History Museum, where he also conducted the yearly bird walks celebrating International Dawn Chorus Day at the museum's grounds.

Bonello lives in Cardiff with his wife, Jennifer Gallichan, who is also part of The Gentle Good's live lineup.

He supports Welsh independence.

== Solo discography ==
=== Albums ===
- While You Slept I Went Out Walking (2008, Gwymon)
- Tethered for the Storm (2010, Gwymon)
- Y Bardd Anfarwol (2013, Bubblewrap Records)
- Ruins/Adfeilion (2016, Bubblewrap Records)
- ‘Sai-thaiñ ki Sur (2021, with Khasi-Cymru Collective, Naxos World)
- Galargan (2023, Bubblewrap Records)
- Elan (2025, Bubblewrap Records)

=== EPs ===
- Find Your Way Back Home (2005, self-released)
- Dawel Disgyn (2007, Gwymon)
- Plygeiniwch! (2014, via Bandcamp)
- Y Gwyfyn (2018, Bubblewrap) release marking Welsh Language Music Day
- Oifad (2020, via Bandcamp) recorded for BBC Radio Cymru
