= Eyelet (album) =

Studio album by Islet
- Released: 6 March 2020
- Genre: Avant-pop
- Length: 42:52
- Label: Fire

Islet chronology
Released by the Movement (2013)	Eyelet (2020)

Professional ratings
Aggregate scores
Source	Rating
AnyDecentMusic?	6.9/10
Metacritic	74/100
Review scores
Source	Rating
AllMusic	4/5 stars
The Line of Best Fit	8.5/10
Loud and Quiet	6/10

Eyelet is the third studio album by Welsh band Islet. It was released on 6 March 2020 under Fire Records.

== Critical reception ==
Eyelet was met with generally favourable reviews from critics. At Metacritic, which assigns a weighted average rating out of 100 to reviews from mainstream publications, this release received an average score of 74, based on 6 reviews.

== Track listing ==
Eyelet track listing
No.	Title	Length
1.	"Caterpillar"	2:47
2.	"Good Grief"	4:31
3.	"Treasure"	5:03
4.	"Geese"	6:55
5.	"Sgwylfa Rock"	2:20
6.	"Radel 10"	4:18
7.	"Clouds"	2:55
8.	"Florist"	3:32
9.	"Moon"	4:21
10.	"No Host"	3:05
11.	"Gyratory Circus"	3:05
