= Race Horses =

Welsh band

- Also known as: Radio Luxembourg
- Origin: Aberystwyth/Cardiff, Wales
- Genres: Psychedelic pop, indie
- Years active: 2005–2013
- Labels: Peski, Fantastic Plastic, Stolen
- Past members: Meilyr Jones; Dylan Hughes; Alun Gaffey; Gwion Llewelyn; Dan Bradley; Mali Llywelyn; Ben Herrick

Race Horses were a Welsh band based in Cardiff, Wales and originally from Aberystwyth. Formed in 2005 as Radio Luxembourg, they changed their name in 2009 due to possible legal problems with the radio station of the same name. Initially the majority of their lyrics were in Welsh, but their final album Furniture was entirely in English.

After appearing across Wales and during the debut Festival N°6, the band announced their split in January 2013 and performed a farewell gig the following month at Clwb Ifor Bach.

== After Race Horses ==
Gwion Llewelyn has been the drummer for Yr Ods and performs live with Aldous Harding, Baxter Dury, Meilyr Jones, Alys Williams, Georgia Ruth and others. He and Mali Llywelyn both play with Villagers.

Alun Gaffey continues solo as a singer-songwriter. His self-titled debut album came out in 2016 and was nominated for that year's Welsh Music Prize. His second album Llyfrau Hanes was released in 2020. In 2024 he started releasing music with a new project, GAFF.

Dylan Hughes played with the band Endaf Gremlin (2013–2014). Since 2018 he has been leading the band Ynys.

Meilyr Jones played bass with Neon Neon on their 2013 live shows supporting the album Praxis Makes Perfect. He's also collaborated on the Cousins project with Euros Childs, their album released in 2012, and with Stealing Sheep. In 2010-2011 he was involved with Cate Le Bon on the Yoke project. He released his debut solo single, Refugees/Birds, on Moshi Moshi Records in August 2015, and his debut full album, 2013, came out the following March. In November 2016, the album won the 2015-2016 Welsh Music Prize.

== Discography ==
- Diwrnod Efo'r Anifeiliaid (2007 EP by Radio Luxembourg)
- Goodbye Falkenburg (2010)
- Furniture (2012)
