= David Hughes Parry =

University academic (1893–1973)

David Hughes Parry, 1937

Sir David Hughes Parry (3 January 1893 – 8 January 1973) was a university administrator, Professor of Law and Vice-Chancellor of the University of London from 1945 to 1948. He was also founder of the university's Institute of Advanced Legal Studies in 1947.

== Early life ==
He was born to a hill farming family in Llanaelhaearn, in the administrative county of Caernarvonshire (now Gwynedd), in the Llŷn Peninsula of north Wales. The family were Welsh-speaking and deeply religious. He learnt English only after he started school. He attended Pwllheli county school (now Ysgol Glan y Môr) from where he won a scholarship to the University College of Wales, Aberystwyth, in 1910, graduating in 1914 with a first in Economics.

== War service ==
In World War I he joined the Royal Welch Fusiliers as an officer in 1915 and did service on the Western Front. He was invalided out in 1919.

== Career ==
He then attended Peterhouse, Cambridge, of which he became an honorary fellow in 1956, and passed the law tripos first class in 1920. After Peterhouse he was a lecturer in law at Aberystwyth. He became a barrister in 1922 at Inner Temple, a bencher in 1952, and took silk in 1955.

In 1924 he became lecturer in law at the London School of Economics and Political Science and from 1928 reader. In 1930 he became professor of English law, succeeding Edward Jenks. When he retired in 1959. it was the leading department in the country. In 1947, he created the University of London's Institute of Advanced Legal Studies, an international centre of legal research, and was director from 1947 to 1959.

At the University of London, he held many important offices including the vice-chancellorship (1945–8) and chairmanship of the court (1962–70). He developed the university's social and athletic facilities rather than at the college level. From 1955 to 1964 he was president of the University of Aberystwith. Hughes Parry Hall, a hall of residence located in Cartwright Gardens, was named after him. He was President of the Aberystwyth Old Students' Association in 1959–60.

He was editor of the Solicitors Journal from 1925 to 1928.

== Personal life ==
In 1923 he married Hâf (1898–1965), only daughter of Sir Owen Morgan Edwards an inspector of education for Wales and briefly Liberal Member of Parliament for Merionethshire. They had no children. His wife inherited her father's house at Llanuwchllyn, which was their Welsh home from 1923. He died there in 1973.

== See also ==
- List of Vice-Chancellors of the University of London

Academic offices
Preceded by Professor Frank Horton FRS	Vice-Chancellor of the University of London; 1945–1948	Succeeded by Dame Lillian Penson
Professional and academic associations
Preceded by Dr David Dilwyn John	President of the Aberystwyth Old Students' Association; 1959–60	Succeeded by Stanley G. Rees
