= Ysgol Glan y Môr =

Coordinates: 52.8820°N 4.4238°W

Location
- Cardiff Road; Pwllheli, Gwynedd, LL53 5NU; Wales

Information
- Type: Comprehensive
- Established: 1969
- Local authority: Gwynedd Council
- Head teacher: Guto Wyn
- Gender: Co-educational
- Age: 11 to 16
- Enrollment: 469 (2024)
- Language: Welsh
- Houses: Tudwal , Enlli , Gwylan
- Colours: Dark Green and Amber
- Website: glanymor.gwynedd.sch.uk

Ysgol Glan y Môr is a bilingual comprehensive school in the market town of Pwllheli in the Welsh county of Gwynedd. The school serves a large part of the Llŷn Peninsula (Welsh: Penrhyn Llŷn). As of 2024, there were 469 pupils on roll at the school. According to the latest Estyn inspection report in 2024, approximately 78 percent of pupils come from Welsh-speaking homes.

== History ==
The modern school was formed when the former Pwllheli Grammar School and the Frondeg Secondary Modern Schools merged. These occupied sites at Ysgol Penrallt (Now home to the Pwllheli campus of Coleg Meirion-Dwyfor) and Upper Ala Road, respectively. The two schools merged in mid-1969 to form a comprehensive school.

The junior pupils (First Year and Second Year) were located at the Ysgol Penrallt site and the senior pupils (Third Year and upwards) were located at a new building constructed on Cardiff Road. This new school was subsequently expanded to accommodate all pupils in the 1990s.

== Notable former pupils ==
- Gwyneth Glyn – poet and singer
- Sir David Hughes Parry (1893–1973) was Vice-Chancellor of London University from 1945 to 1948 (attended Pwllheli county school)
- Hywel Williams – politician
