= Goodbye Falkenburg =

Studio album by Race Horses
- Released: 2010
- Length: 39:33
- Label: Fantastic Plastic
- Producers: David Wrench and Race Horses

Race Horses chronology
| Diwrnod Efo'r Anifeiliaid (2007) | Goodbye Falkenburg (2010) | Furniture (2012) |

Professional ratings
Review scores
| Source | Rating |
|---|---|
| MusicOMH | 3.5/5 stars |
| Pitchfork | 8/10 |

Goodbye Falkenburg is the debut full-length album by the band Race Horses. It was released in 2010.

== Track listing ==
| No. | Title | Length |
|---|---|---|
| 1. | "Man in My Mind" | 2:41 |
| 2. | "Cake" | 3:22 |
| 3. | "Pony" | 3:41 |
| 4. | "Isle of Ewe" | 2:19 |
| 5. | "Cacen Mamgu" | 3:17 |
| 6. | "Glo Ac Oren" | 2:57 |
| 7. | "Voyage to St. Louiscious" | 4:26 |
| 8. | "Discopig" | 0:39 |
| 9. | "Man in My Mind / In a Party Near You" | 2:21 |
| 10. | "Scooter" | 2:08 |
| 11. | "Intergalactic Space Rebellion" | 1:35 |
| 12. | "Captain Penelope Smith" | 3:56 |
| 13. | "Marged Wedi Blino" | 6:11 |
