= Islet (band) =

Welsh psychedelic pop band

- Genres: Experimental rock, psychedelic pop, no wave, krautrock, post-punk
- Years active: 2009–present
- Labels: Shape Records; Turnstile Music; Fire Records
- Members: Emma Daman Thomas; Mark Daman Thomas; John (JT) Thomas; Alex Williams
- Website: islet.wales

Islet are a Welsh band formed in Cardiff in 2009. They are known for their experimental, genre-defying sound and energetic live shows. Their music takes in elements of experimental rock, psychedelic pop, no wave, krautrock and post-punk.

They have been shortlisted for the Welsh Music Prize twice: in 2012, for Illuminated People, and in 2020, for Eyelet. Islet have released four studio albums and four EPs.

== History ==
Islet were formed in Cardiff in 2009 by brothers Mark and John Thomas with Emma Daman (formerly of The Victorian English Gentlemens Club). Alex Williams joined the band in late 2009. After signing to Turnstile Music, the band released the EPs Celebrate this Place and Wimmy in 2010. Despite being an EP, Wimmy was placed at number 32 in the NME Albums and Tracks of the Year, 2010. Celebrate This Place received a positive critical reception from reviewers. In November 2011, the band released in Japan, Celebrate This Place With Me, a compilation of the two EPs on the Big Nothing record label. Their debut album, Illuminated People, was issued in January 2012.

Their early live shows were known for their avant garde approach, high energy and often improvisational performances, with long percussive sections. After performing at Cardiff's Sŵn Festival in 2009, NME described their set as "a shamanic percussive offensive powering the truly unique quartet through a spellbinding half hour that bleeds impassioned improv spirit". One notable aspect of Islet's early live performances was their tendency to swap instruments during their sets, contributing to a dynamic and unpredictable stage presence. Initially the band were known for their lack of interest in promotion - eschewing any form of web presence and choosing to communicate with their zine 'The Isness'. The live shows led to the band developing a cult following.

2013's album, Released by the Movement and 2016's Liquid Half Moon EP were both released on the band's own Shape Records. The music critic, Laura Snapes, noted there was more of a focus on songwriting on the EP. The EP was also included in James Acaster's book, Perfect Sound Whatever, which featured the author's favourite music that was released in 2016.

In 2019, the band signed to Fire Records and announced their forthcoming new album, Eyelet. The album went on to win the 2020 Neutron Prize from God Is in the TV. Around this time John Robb commented on the band's live shows as combining "the threads and entrails of free jazz and the boundary busting attitude of post punk and the endless adventure of world music and even the sweatshod rock n roll of the OC’s into the kind of music that makes the so called avant garde into a party and a celebration of action, time and vision". After seeing the band perform at the Machynlleth Comedy Festival in 2019, Stewart Lee on his website said of Islet, "they blew my mind. It was the perfect mix of experimentation and entertainment, brain and heart engaged simultaneously". On 20 June 2023, the group released a new song "Euphoria" as the lead single from their next album.

Their most recent album, Soft Fascination, was released in September 2023.

== Discography ==
=== EPs ===
- Celebrate This Place (Shape/Turnstile, 2010)
- Wimmy (Shape/Turnstile, 2010)
- Liquid Half Moon EP (Shape 2016)
- Golden Top (2020)

=== Studio albums ===
- Illuminated People (Shape/Turnstile, 2012)
- Released by the Movement (Shape, 2013)
- Eyelet (Fire Records, 2020)
- Soft Fascination (Fire Records, 2023)
