= Sarah Howells =

British singer-songwriter and trance vocalist

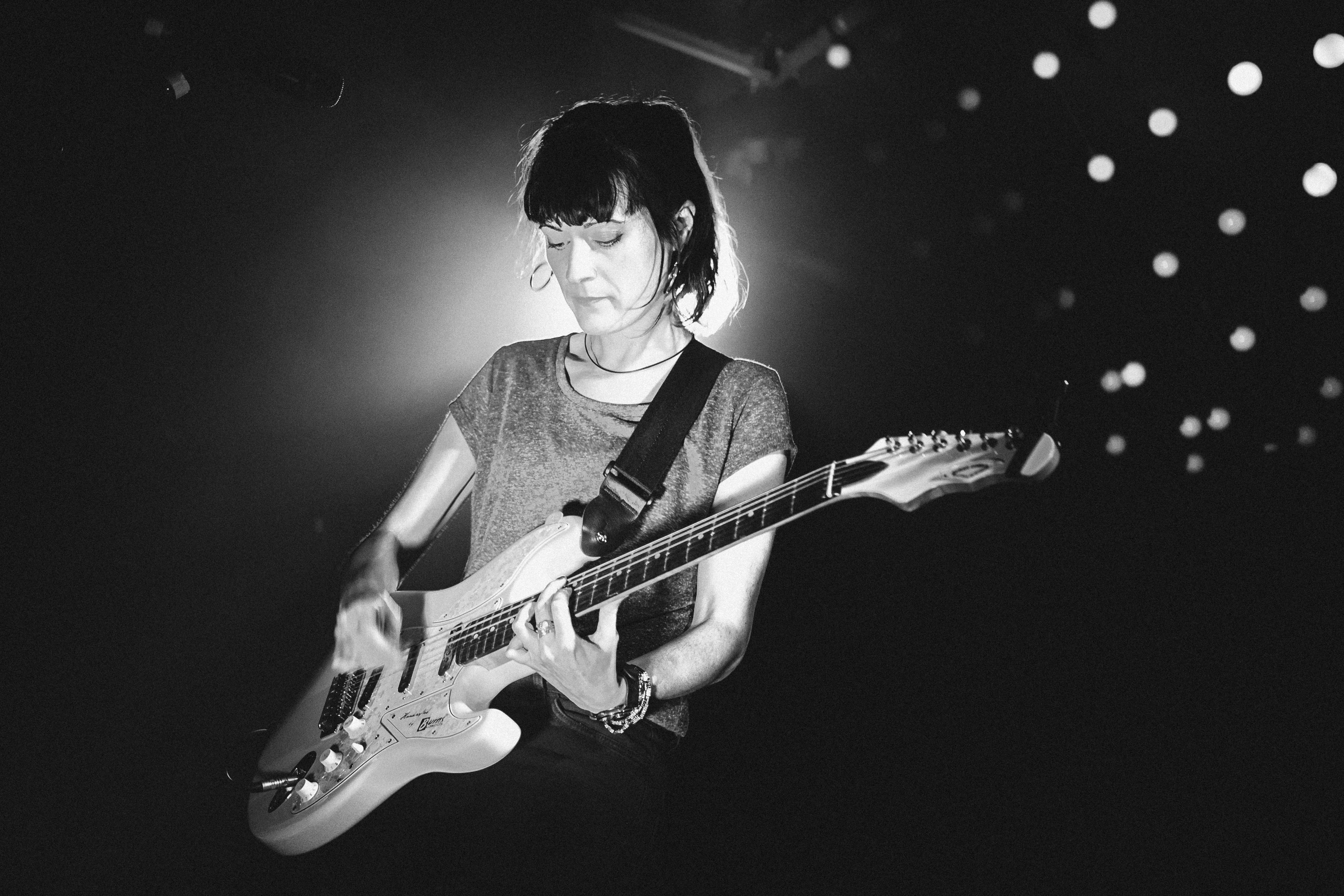
- Sarah Howells performing as Bryde at Camden Assembly in May 2017.
- Occupations: Singer; songwriter
- Known for: Paper Aeroplanes, Bryde

Sarah Howells is a Welsh singer-songwriter also known as Bryde. She was a member of Welsh indie-folk band Paper Aeroplanes. She has been performing as the solo project 'Bryde' since 2016.

== Biography ==
Howells formed her first band in Milford Haven, West Wales, when she was 10 years old, with friend Nia George. They later formed a four-piece band, JYLT, with two other school friends. JYLT was disbanded in 2004 when George died aged 21, of leukaemia.

Howells' main musical project, together with co-writer and guitarist Richard Llewellyn, also from west Wales, was the band Paper Aeroplanes (originally known as Halflight). Formed (as Halflight) in 2003, Paper Aeroplanes have had national radio airplay on BBC Radio 2 and BBC 6 Music as well as touring Germany with Tina Dico and several releases since. They released their debut album The Day We Ran into the Sea in 2009 and were nominated for the Welsh Music Prize with 2015 album JOY.

She came to dance music by chance. When Lange, a DJ and record producer, moved to Cardiff and was looking for a female vocalist for his album Better Late Than Never, he met Howells, who lived there at the time. They together produced the single "Out of the Sky". The song became a trance hit and was remixed by Kyau & Albert, and Aly & Fila. Armin van Buuren picked the song for his year compilation A State of Trance 2008. Armin van Buuren also selected the song in his ASOT 500 broadcast.

After the success with her debut single, Howells worked with other trance musicians in 2009 such as First State, John O'Callaghan and Dash Berlin. Most successful was the single "Find Yourself", a collaboration with John O'Callaghan. The song made it on numerous compilations and the Cosmic Gate remix was also on the year compilation A State of Trance 2009. In 2010, two of her songs each appeared on the album Changing Lanes of First State and Harmonic Motion of Lange.

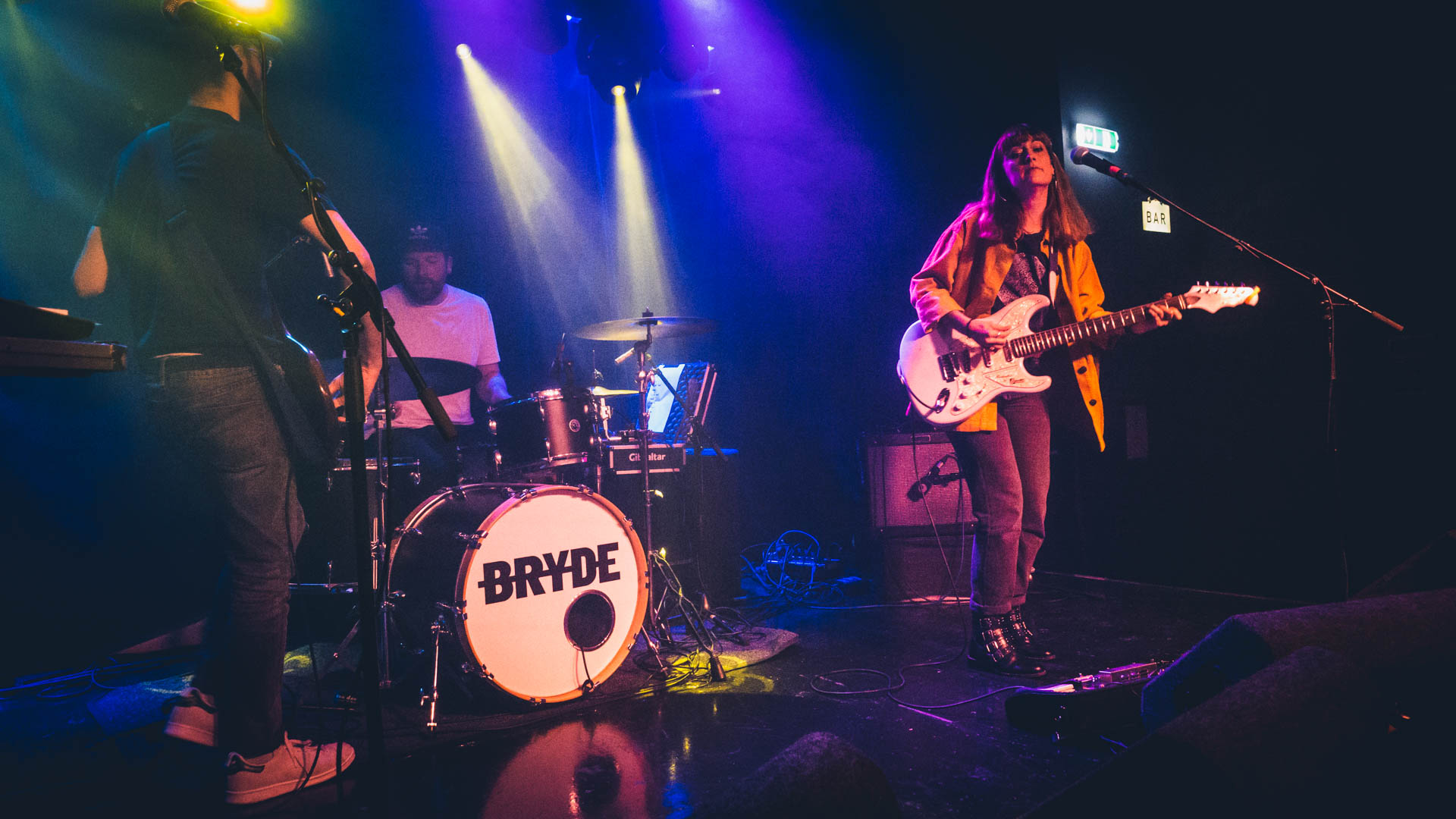
Bryde in Oslo in 2022

In 2016 Howells began a new solo project, using the name Bryde. Her EP has been played on BBC Radio 1 and BBC Radio Wales and, in 2016, she toured the UK and USA. Her debut album, Like an Island, was released in 2018 to positive reviews. It was followed up by a twenty-nine date European tour.

== Discography ==
See also Paper Aeroplanes Discography

=== Albums and EPs ===
- 2004: Subside e.p. (with Halflight)
- 2005: Pick Me mini-album (with Halflight)
- 2007: My Disguise mini-album (with Halflight)
- 2009: The Day We Ran into the Sea (with Paper Aeroplanes)
- 2011: We Are Ghosts (with Paper Aeroplanes)
- 2011: A Comfortable Sleep EP (with Paper Aeroplanes)
- 2012: Time To Be EP (with Paper Aeroplanes, later combined with A Comfortable Sleep into an album)
- 2013: Little Letters (with Paper Aeroplanes)
- 2014: Circus EP (with Paper Aeroplanes)
- 2015: Joy (with Paper Aeroplanes)
- 2015: Chocolate Factory Sessions (as Bryde)
- 2016: EP1 EP (as Bryde)
- 2016: EP2 EP (as Bryde)
- 2018: Like an Island (as Bryde)
- 2019: On The Subject Of Breathing 7"-Single (as Bryde)
- 2020: The Volume of Things (as Bryde)
- 2022: Still (as Bryde)

=== Collaborations ===
- 2008: Lange feat. Sarah Howells – "Out of the Sky"
- 2009: First State feat. Sarah Howells – "Brave"
- 2009: John O'Callaghan feat. Sarah Howells – "Find Yourself"
- 2009: Lange feat. Sarah Howells – "Let It All Out"
- 2009: Dash Berlin feat. Sarah Howells & Secede – "Believe in You"
- 2010: Lange feat. Sarah Howells – "Fireworks"
- 2011: Al Lewis – "In the Wake" (vocals and co-writing)
- 2011: First State feat. Sarah Howells – "Reverie"
- 2011: First State feat. Sarah Howells – "Skies on Fire"
- 2011: Daz Bailey feat. Sarah Howells – "In My Veins"
- 2011: tyDi feat. Sarah Howells – "Acting Crazy"
- 2012: Paper Aeroplanes – "Winter Never Comes" (Mark Eteson Remix)
- 2012: Vexare feat. Sarah Howells – "Lanterns"
- 2012: Paul van Dyk feat. Sarah Howells – "Heart Stops Beating"
- 2012: Dash Berlin feat. Sarah Howells – "Go It Alone"
- 2012: Schiller with Paper Aeroplanes – "Lay Down"
- 2012: Simon Patterson feat. Sarah Howells – "Here & Now"
- 2012: Markus Schulz feat. Sarah Howells – "Tempted"
- 2013: tyDi feat. Sarah Howells – "When I Go"
- 2013: First State feat. Sarah Howells – "Seeing Stars"
- 2014: Simon Patterson feat. Sarah Howells – "Dissolve"
- 2015: Venom One feat. Sarah Howells – "Rush"
- 2018: Fatherson feat. Sarah Howells – "Nothing to No One"
- 2025: Mark Sherry & Sarah Howells – "Heroes"
