= Paper Aeroplanes =

Welsh alternative pop band (2009-2015)

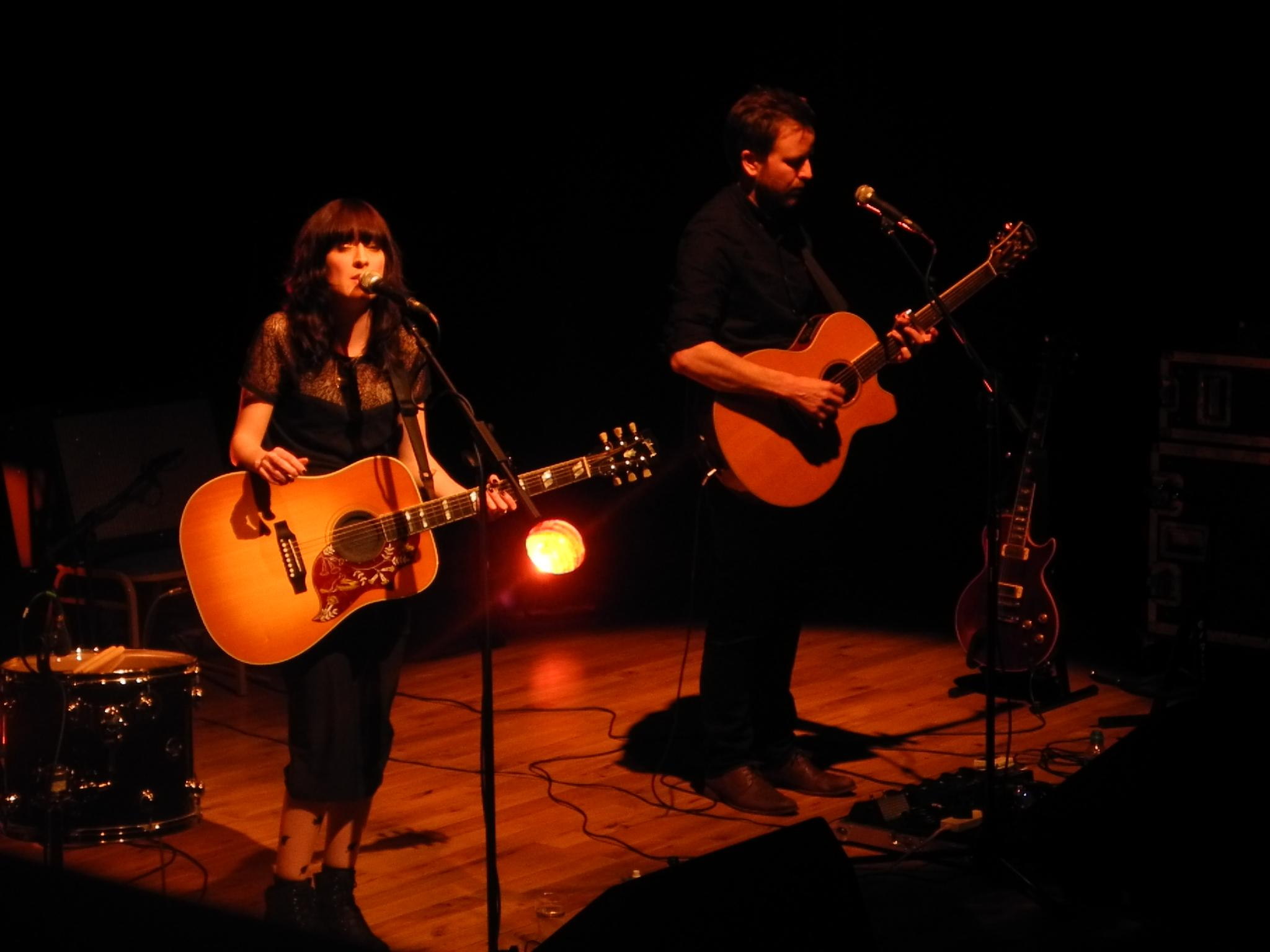
- Paper Aeroplanes performing at The Junction 2, Cambridge in May 2013

Background information
- Also known as: Halflight
- Origin: Milford Haven, Wales
- Genre: Folk pop
- Years active: 2009–2015
- Label: My First Records
- Past members: Sarah Howells; Richard Llewellyn

Paper Aeroplanes were a Welsh alternative pop band founded in 2009 (when they changed their name from Halflight) by Sarah Howells and Richard Llewellyn, although both members had played together in Halflight since 2003. The band built up a fanbase through gigging in Cardiff in their early years, before later touring UK-wide and across Europe.

After releasing four albums and going on several tours, including a sold-out show at London's Union Chapel, the group announced their separation to focus on solo projects in 2017. Howells now tours as a solo artist under the stage name Bryde.

== History ==
Guitarist Sarah Howells, from Milford Haven in Pembrokeshire, was a member of promising indie band Jylt which broke up when her friend and the band's bassist Nia George was diagnosed with leukaemia in 2002. Following a period of reflection Sarah teamed up with fellow guitarist Richard Llewellyn, originally from Ceredigion, to form Halflight. The duo, who were compared to artists as diverse as Lisa Loeb and The Sundays, began building a fanbase by extensive gigging across South Wales and released three EPs on their own My First Record label between 2004 and 2007, each of which met with critical acclaim and garnered positive reviews. In 2008, at about the same time that they were recording their debut album, they announced that they intended changing their name, in order to avoid clashing with another band called Half Light.

The name chosen was Paper Aeroplanes and they have continued to make music that has been compared to Fleetwood Mac, Suzanne Vega, The Sundays, Marika Hackman and Laura Marling. The BBC described them as "a west coast, easy-riding, folkish indie with a pop sensibility", 31 May 2010.

Their album The Day We Ran into the Sea, which was released in 2010 and included a number of songs performed live by Halflight, was described by the BBC's Adam Walton as "'pop' music: brilliantly crafted and stoked from a bruised heart's embers". BBC Radio Wales described it as "the finest radio album to come out of Wales since Rockferry". Their 2011 album We Are Ghosts received a host of reviews and saw The Guardian describe them as "disarming, breezy pop that's tinged with melancholy". Paul Kerr, reviewing their 2011 EP A Comfortable Sleep for Fourohfive 405 said "Paper Aeroplanes are an oasis of gravity in a cultural desert of frivolity, of emotion in a cold hearted world."

In 2012, the band performed at Hay Festival. August 2012 saw several songs soundtracking an episode of BBC3's TV Series Lip Service. Their third album, Little Letters, was released on Navigator Records and saw the band reach number 28 in the UK Alternative Chart.

The band have played live on BBC Radio Wales several times and featured on Bob Harris's BBC Radio 2 show, being interviewed by Harris and performing a live session. They have also recorded a live video session for the BBC. BBC Radio Wales are big supporters of the band making them Artist of the Week several times, most recently in May 2015 with single, "Good Love Lives On".

The band have toured the UK and Germany for several years building a live following. They sold out London's Union Chapel in November 2014. They also played at The New Adelphi Club, Hull, East Yorkshire in January that year.

The album JOY was released on 8 April 2015, and saw tracks featured on BBC Radio's 1 and 2 as well as a host of German stations such as NDR2 and Radio Eins.

In April 2015, Paper Aeroplanes played their debut SXSW show playing several shows most notably at British Music Embassy at Latitude 60.

In November 2017, the band announced on their official Facebook page that "while they don't want to say that Paper Aeroplanes has come to an end", they had no plans to record future music together, with Howells instead choosing to focus on her solo project Bryde.

== Discography ==
=== As Halflight ===
- Subside E.P. - 4 tracks (2004), My First Records (mfrcd001)
- Pick Me - 6 track mini-album (2005), My First Records (mfrcd002)
- My Disguise - 7 track mini-album (October 24, 2007), My First Records (mfrcd003)

=== Albums ===
- The Day We Ran into the Sea (2010), My First Records (mfr004)
- We Are Ghosts (March 2011), My First Records (mfrcd007)
- We Are Ghosts - 2nd Edition (2011), My First Records (mfrcd011). Reissue with four additional tracks.
- Little Letters (May 2013), Navigator Records (NAVIGATOR081)
- Time to Be & a Comfortable Sleep (November 21, 2013), My First Records (mfrcd013). Amalgamation of two EPs released in 2011 and 2012.
- JOY (April 2015), My First Records (mfrcd016)

=== Singles and EPs ===
- Not as Old as You Think (2010), My First Records (Limited Edition of 100 featuring previously unreleased track Way Down)
- Lifelight EP (2010), My First Records
- Safe Hands EP - 4 tracks (2011), My First Records (mfrcd008). Limited edition distributed through UK independent coffee shops and cafes
- My First Love EP - 3 tracks (2011), My First Records (mfrcd009)
- A Comfortable Sleep EP – 4 tracks (2011), My First Records (mfrcd010)
- Time to Be EP – 6 tracks (2012)
- Circus EP – 5 tracks (2014), My First Records (MFRCD014)
