= Trwbador =

Welsh musical duo

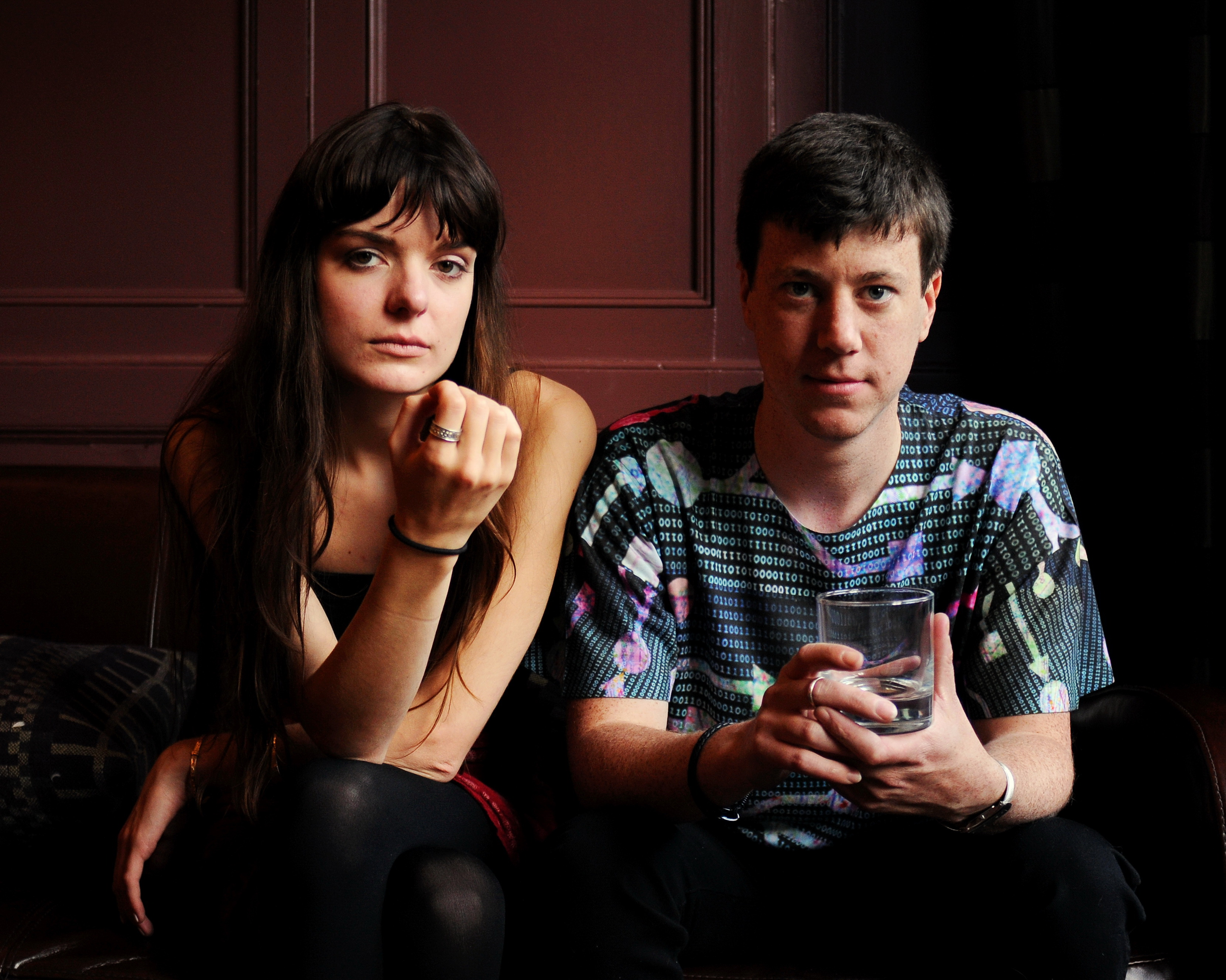

Background information
- Origin: Newport, Wales
- Genres: Electronic, indie pop
- Years active: 2010–2015
- Labels: Owlet Music, Great Pop Supplement, Tummy Touch Records
- Past members: Owain Gwilym, Angharad Van Rijswijk

Trwbador were a Welsh duo who occupied a place in the musical landscape between folk and techno. The two-piece resided in Carmarthenshire, although they began working together while at University in Newport. Trwbador's original sound has established them as a forerunner of the Welsh music scene.

== 2010–2012 ==
Members Owain Gwilym and Angharad Van Rijswijk began writing music together in 2010. After graduating from Newport University, the two relocated to West Wales, where they are originally from, and released two home-recorded EPs through their own label Owlet Music. Songs from these EPs were featured on UK Radio shows and the track Off-Beat became one of BBC Radio Wales DJ Adam Walton's tracks of the year. The track Sun in the Winter was the MPFree on BBC 6 Music's Lauren Laverne breakfast show and played by Huw Stephens on his BBC Radio 1 show.

After being heard on the radio, Trwbador were invited to play at the London 2012 Olympics. In December 2012 Cornershop released a Christmas single titled Every Year So Different featuring Angharad on vocals.

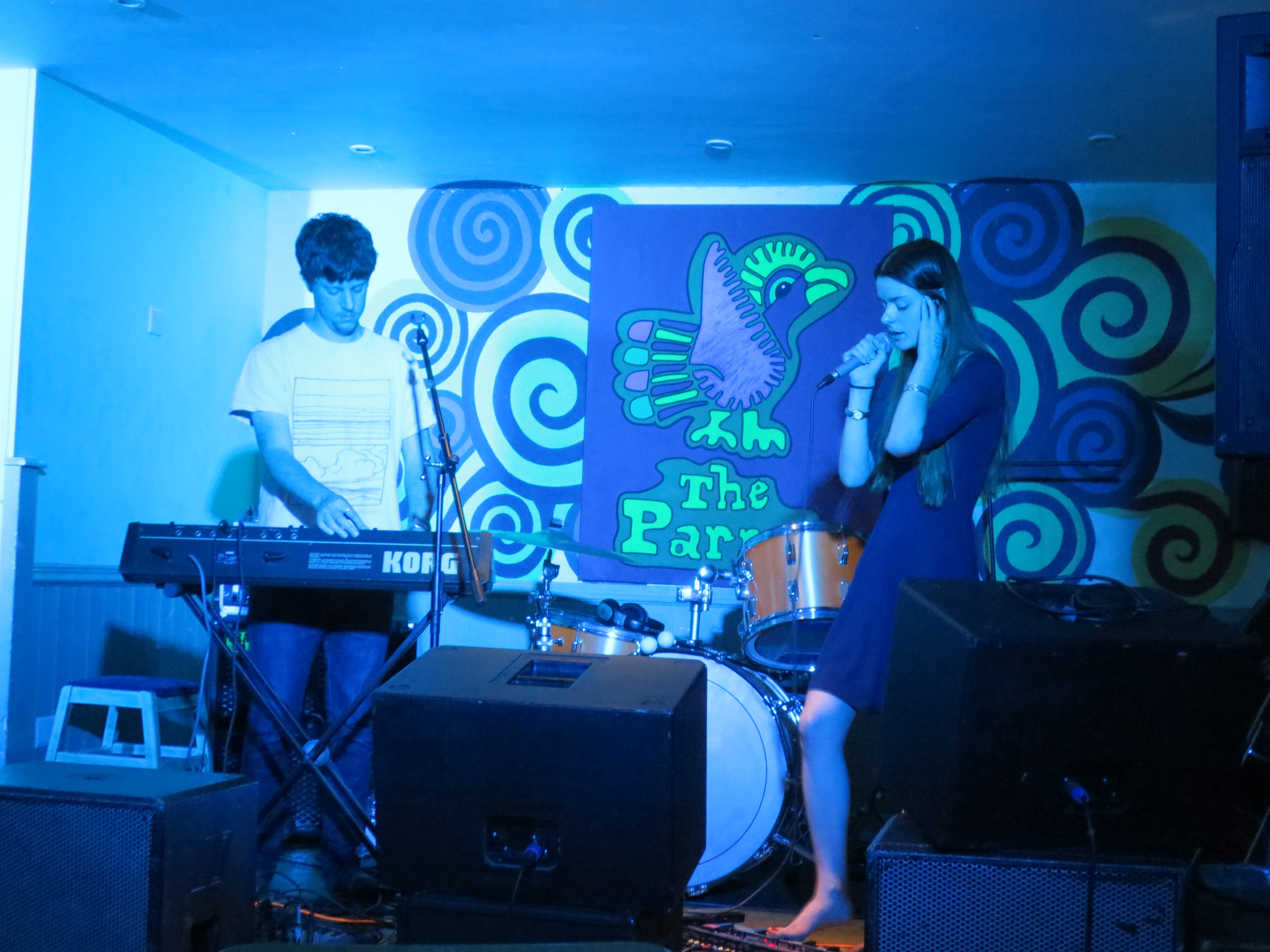
Trwbador on stage at The Parrot in Carmarthen in 2013

== Debut album (2013) ==
In April 2013 Trwbador released their self-titled debut album. Cornershop play Sitar and Tanpura for the album version of the track Sun in the Winter re-recorded for this album. The album was released on CD through Owlet Music was released on 12" LP on white vinyl by The Great Pop Supplement with artwork by Cardiff artist Nic Finch. The album was received positively among music websites and magazines, getting a four star review in Q Magazine with the description "A magic debut". In Summer 2013 Trwbador performed at a number of festivals to promote the release of their album, including Glastonbury Festival, Green Man Festival, SWN Festival and Laugharne Weekend. A track from the album, Red Handkerchiefs, went on to feature in the 2013 TV advert for Visit Wales and the 2014 TV advert for Lindeman's wine. In November 2013 James Dean Bradfield named Trwbador as an influence for the track Builder of Routines from the Manic Street Preachers album Rewind the Film. As 2013 drew to an end Trwbador's debut album was shortlisted for the Welsh Music Prize.

== Several Wolves (2014) ==
In June 2014 Trwbador released a hip-hop single featuring vocals by London rapper Esaa (also known as Yungun). The track was released on seven-inch record and digital download again via Owlet Music and was praised by radio DJs including Rob Da Bank and Lauren Laverne, whose BBC 6 Music show it was featured on as the MPFree. The track also had play on XFM, the first time the duo had been played on this station. Following Breakthrough came Trwbador's second album Several Wolves, which was released in August 2014 on Owlet Music. The title was taken from the essay by Deleuze and Guattari "One or Several Wolves" from the book A Thousand Plateaus. Along with the guest appearance from Essa on Breakthrough, Welsh artist Richard James performed vocals on the track Blue Minds. Several Wolves also received positive reviews including 8/10 from Mixmag, 4 stars from Q Magazine, 7/10 from Uncut magazine, ArtRocker album of the week, BBC 6 Music album of the day and an article in The Quietus among others. After the positive reception of the album, Trwbador closed the year by playing a live session at BBC Maida Vale studios for Huw Stephens BBC Radio 1 show.

== In 2015 ==
Channel 4 drama series Raised by Wolves used the Trwbador song "Love & Folly" on episode 3, "Mehmesis", in May 2015. In September, the announcement was made over the duo's website that Trwbador is over. Shortly after, their second album Several Wolves was nominated for the 2014–2015 Welsh Music Prize.

== Discography ==
- It Snowed A Lot This Year EP (2010)
- Sun in the Winter EP (2011)
- Safe single (2013)
- Mountain / Once I Had a Love single (2013)
- Trwbador album (2013)
- Breakthrough (featuring Essa) single (2014)
- Several Wolves album (2014)
