= Gwyneth Glyn =

Welsh poet and musician

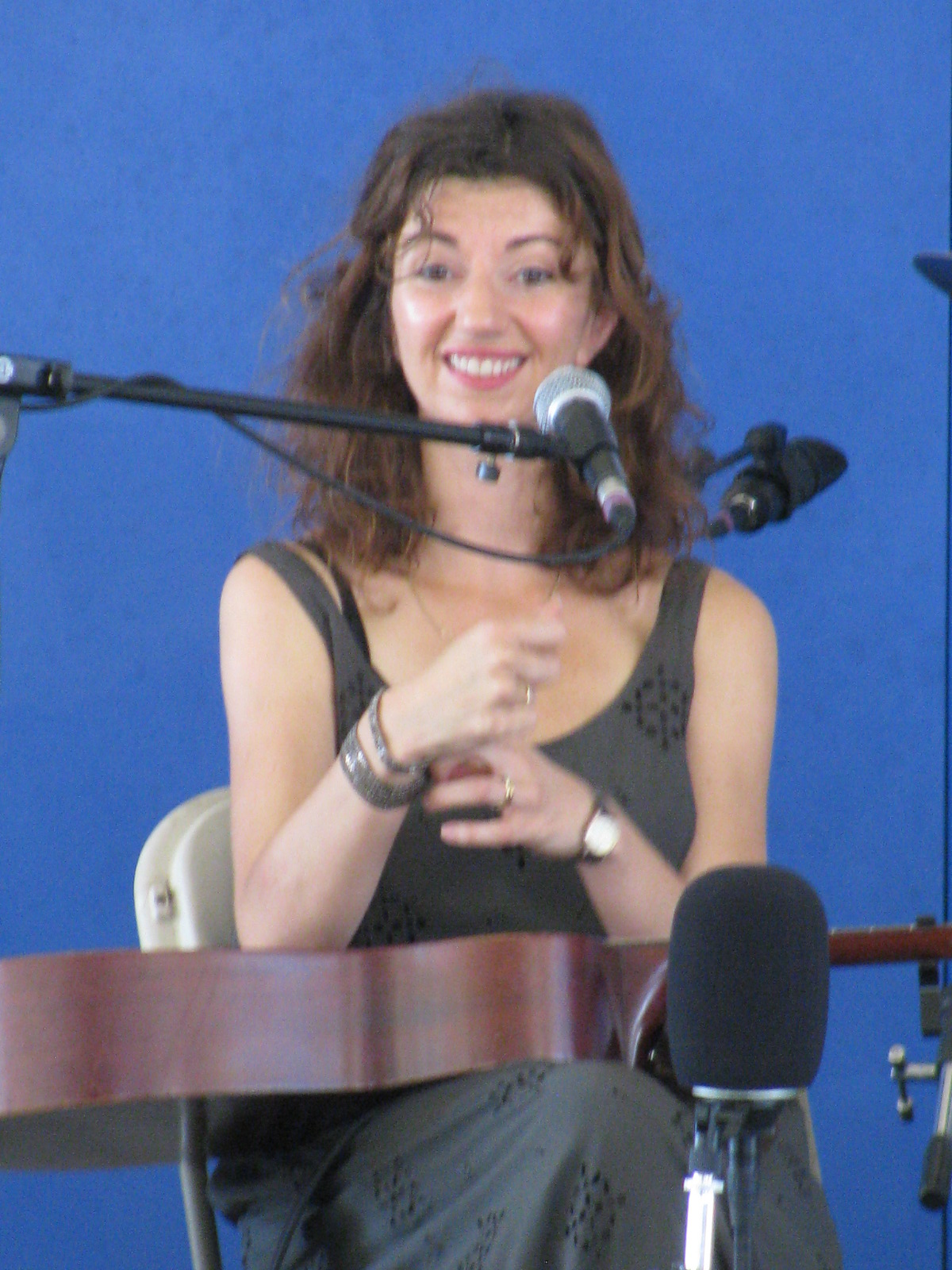
- Gwyneth Glyn at the Smithsonian Folk Festival 2013 in Washington, D.C.

Background information
- Born: 14 December 1979 (age 46); Bangor, Gwynedd, Wales
- Genres: Traditional, Folk
- Years active: 2005–present
- Awards: Urdd National Eisteddfod Crown

Gwyneth Glyn (born Gwyneth Glyn Evans, 14 December 1979) is a Welsh language poet and musician.

== Biography ==
Gwyneth Glyn was born in St David's Hospital in Bangor, Gwynedd, and grew up at her family home in Llanarmon. She was educated at Ysgol Glan y Môr, Pwllheli and Coleg Meirion-Dwyfor before going on to gain a first class honours degree in Philosophy and Theology at Jesus College, Oxford.

She was a member of the band Coca Rosa and the Dirty Cousins.

She won the Crown at the 1998 Urdd Gobaith Cymru Eisteddfod, and was the Welsh Children's Poet Laureate for 2006–2007.

== Bibliography ==
- Gwneud Môr a Mynydd (Gwyneth Glyn Evans, Lowri Davies, Esyllt Nest Roberts), June 2000 (Gwasg Carreg Gwalch)
- Straeon Bolwyn: Bolwyn a'r Dyn Eira Cas, November 2000 (Gwasg Carreg Gwalch)
- Straeon Bolwyn: Bolwyn yn y Sioe Nadolig, November 2000, (Gwasg Carreg Gwalch])
- Plant Mewn Panig!, October 2004, (Dref Wen)
- Drws Arall i'r Coed (Gwyneth Glyn Evans, Eurgain Haf, Dyfrig Jones, Caryl Lewis, Manon Wyn), February 2005 (Sgript Cymru)
- Cyfres Pen Dafad: Mewn Limbo/Sbinia (Gwyneth Glyn Evans, Bedwyr Rees – CD), July 2005 (Cwmni Recordio Sain)
- Cyfres Pen Dafad: Aminah a Minna, November 2005 (Y Lolfa)
- Dramâu'r Drain: Deryn Mewn Llaw, January 2006 (Y Lolfa)
- Cyfres Codi'r Llenni – Mewn Limbo: Sgript a Gweithgareddau (Gwyneth Glyn Evans, Lowri Cynan), January 2007 (Y Lolfa)
- Cyfres Pen Dafad: Mewn Limbo, May 2007 (Y Lolfa)

== Discography ==
=== Albums ===
- Wyneb dros dro ("A temporary face" [Idiomatically, "temporary surface", used on road signs]), 2005 (Slacyr)
- Tonau ("Waves"), 2007 (Recordiau Gwinllan)
- Cainc ("Branches"), 2011
- Tro ("Turn"), 2017 (Bendigedig)

=== Singles ===
- Paid â Deud ("Don't Say") (collaboration with Cowbois Rhos Botwnnog), 2008 (Sbrigyn Ymborth)

== Reception ==
Her song 'Can y Cŵn' from 2017 album Tro was nominated for a BBC Radio 2 folk award in February 2018. This was her second nomination, the first was following her involvement in the Songs of Separation Cardiff concert of 2016 featuring British female folk artists, which won the Best Album in 2017.
