= Jodie Marie =

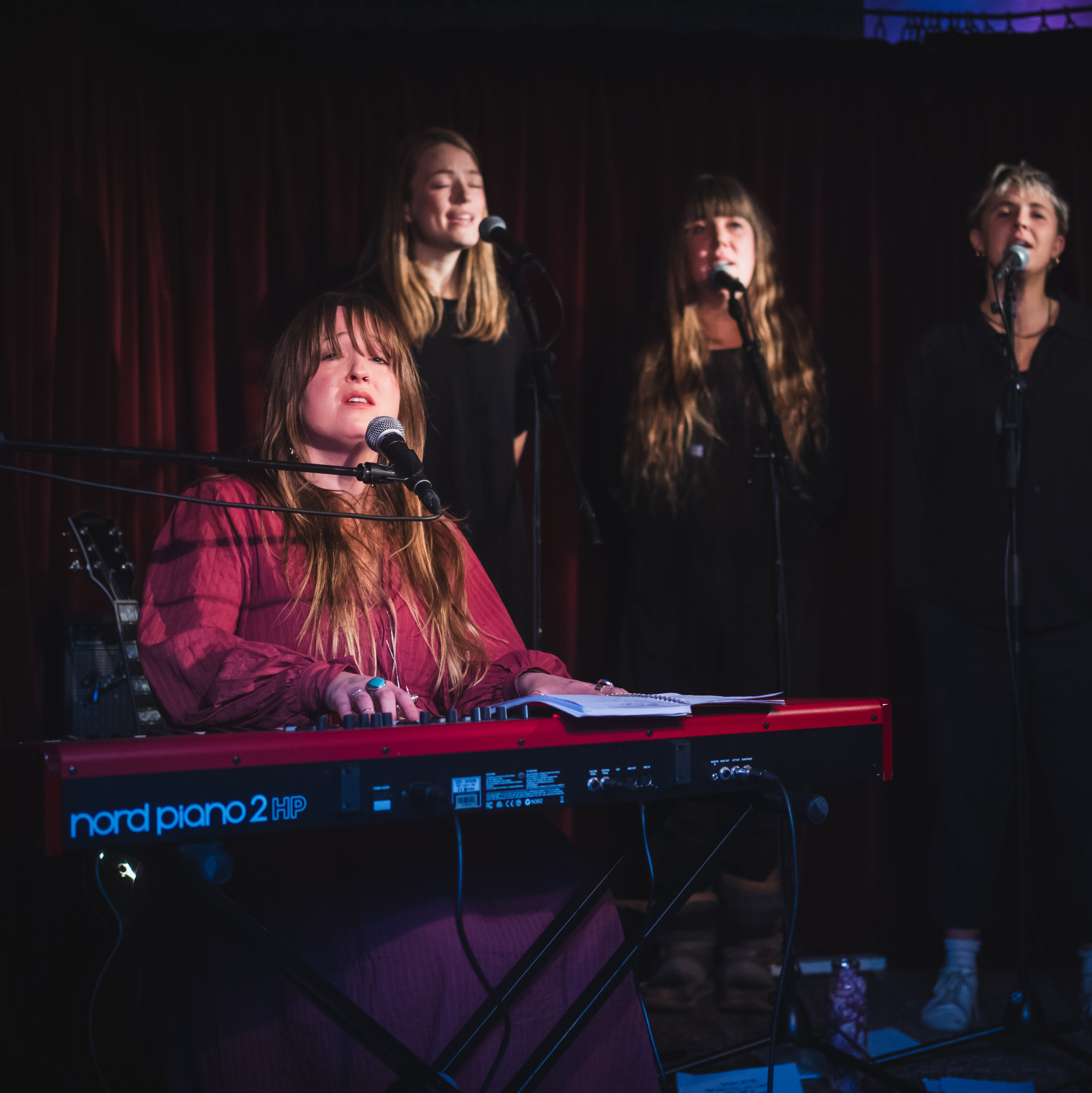
- by Paul Hudson in 2023

Background information
- Born: 12 June 1991 (age 34); Wales
- Genres: Folk / Pop, Alternative rock, Soul, Blues
- Occupation(s): Singer, songwriter
- Instrument(s): Vocals, Guitar, Keyboards
- Years active: 2011–present
- Labels: Decca Records
- Website: jodiemarie.co.uk

Jodie Marie Warlow (born 12 June 1991) is a Welsh singer-songwriter better known by her stage name, Jodie Marie. She was signed to Decca Records in 2010. Jodie Marie's 2012 debut album Mountain Echo has been described by The Guardian as 'velvety and bittersweet' and The Independent as 'having a light-blues and jazz-folk-edge recalling late-1960s singer-songwriters such as Carole King.

== Career beginnings ==
When she was 16, Jodie Marie was spotted by the father of a music industry manager from Transgressive Records, an independent record label based in London, who was visiting Pembrokeshire on holiday. Shortly after, Jodie found herself with a manager and began writing songs with former Suede guitarist Bernard Butler and singer songwriter Ed Harcourt.

== Personal life ==
Born in Narberth, Pembrokeshire, Jodie Marie grew up listening to singers such as Bonnie Raitt, B. B. King, Eric Clapton, Janis Joplin and Jimi Hendrix and says her parents, John and Denise Warlow, have been a huge influence, as well as support from her friends and family, including her elder sister Nikki. Jodie Marie started performing at local gigs at the age of seven. She began writing her own material when she was in her early teens.

== Discography ==
=== Albums ===
Title	Details
Mountain Echo	Released: 5 March 2012; Label: Verve; Format: CD, digital download
Trouble in Mind	Released: 25 July 2015; Label: StudiOwz; Format: CD, digital download
The Answer	Released: 12 February 2021; Label: Carmel Records; Format: CD, vinyl, digital download

Jodie Marie's track I Got You appears on the compilation double album You Raise Me Up 2012 released on the Decca label on 5 March 2012.

=== Singles ===
- Single Blank Canvas was Jodie Marie's debut single released on 4 July 2011.
- On the Road was released on 7 October 2011, and as a 7″ vinyl single on 14 November 2011, on the re-launched Verve label and included the track Single Blank Canvas. The Single made the BBC Radio 2 playlist for November 2011.
- Remember Me released on Monday 29 October 2012
- The Night Before Christmas was released as a download in English and Welsh versions on 10 December 2012.
- "Only One I'm Thinking Of" was released as a download on 25 July 2015.
- "Carageen" was released as a download on 18 September 2020.
- "(I Don’t Wanna Be) Alone This Christmas" was released as a download on 30 November 2020.
- "This House" was released as a download on 5 February 2021.
- "Ain’t No Doubt About It" was released as a download on 12 February 2021.

== Touring and Concerts ==
Jodie Marie supported British singer-songwriter and actor Will Young on his 2011 UK tour.

Singer Jonathan Jeremiah was supported by Jodie Marie on 17 October 2011 on his European tour, which included concerts in the Netherlands, Germany, Belgium, Luxembourg and Switzerland.

On 4 November 2011 Jodie Marie supported BRIT Award winning British singer and songwriter Nerina Pallot in concert in Manchester.

On Tuesday 7 August 2012, Jodie Marie featured at the BT London Live festival in Hyde Park, part of the London 2012 Olympics celebrations.

Jodie Marie performed at the Cambridge Lodestar Festival in September 2012.

== TV appearances and radio broadcasts ==
On Monday 6 June 2011, Jodie Marie appeared on the BBC Radio 1 programme BBC Introducing with Jen Long in session and played Dandelion Wishes and Single Blank Canvas.

Jodie Marie appeared on BBC Breakfast Television News on 13 January 2012 and sang a live acoustic version of the Joan Baez song Silver Dagger.

On 15 March 2012, Jodie Marie appeared on Channel 4 Television's 4Play programme which provides in-depth profiles and exclusive performances from top music acts.

On 26 February 2012, Jodie Marie was interviewed on BBC Radio 2 by Sir Terry Wogan for his Weekend Wogan Radio show.

An hour-long S4C television documentary on 8 May 2012 followed Jodie during the release of her debut album – Mountain Echo.
