= Cowbois Rhos Botwnnog =

Welsh folk band

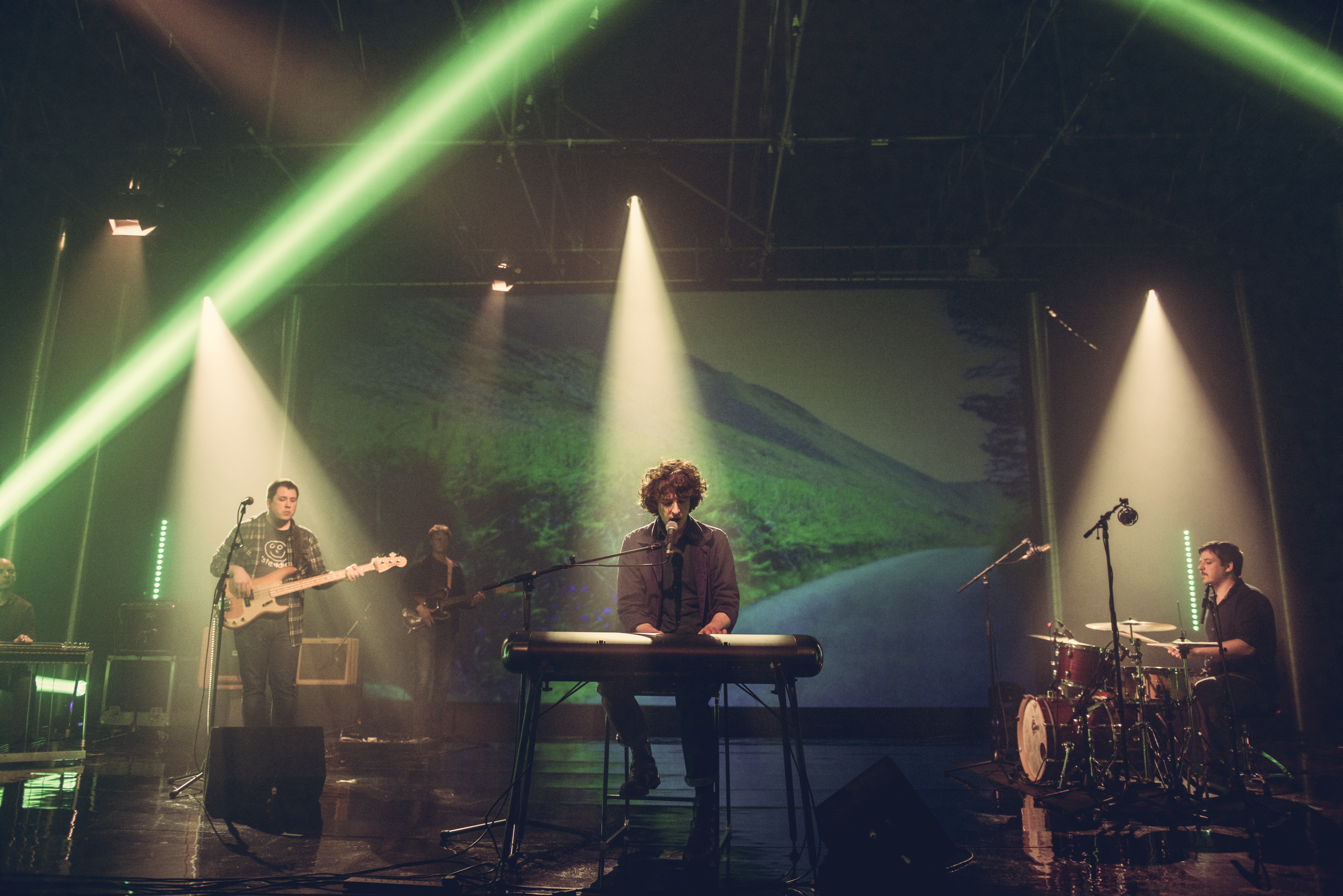

Background information
- Origin: Rhos Botwnnog, Wales
- Genres: Americana; Folk; Alternative country Rock; Surf; Country
- Years active: 2006–present
- Label: Sbrigyn Ymborth
- Members: Iwan Hughes; Dafydd Hughes; Aled Hughes; Llyr Pari; Branwen Williams; Euron Jones; Osian Huw Williams
- Website: http://www.crhb.net/

Cowbois Rhos Botwnnog is a Welsh folk band consisting of three brothers from Rhos Botwnnog, between the villages of Botwnnog and Llaniestyn on the Llŷn Peninsula, Gwynedd, Wales, and accompanying musicians and singers. They experiment with country, folk and rock music. Most of their lyrics are in Welsh.

== Career ==
The three brothers, Iwan, Aled and Dafydd Hughes, formed the band in 2006 and got a fair amount of attention from the Welsh language music scene through an early appearance on S4C's music programme Bandit. BBC Radio Cymru's C2 programme slot also regularly aired demos that the band had recorded. By the time they had released their debut album, Dawns Y Trychfilod ("Dance of the Insects") on the Sbrigyn Ymborth label in 2007, they had already developed a good following and were regularly appearing on stage with some of Wales's best known acts. The album was produced by Dyl Mei and recorded at the producer's now-closed Blaen y Cae studio. The band launched the album with a headlining tour throughout Wales. The album stayed at the number 1 slot for numerous weeks on the C2 chart.

In 2008, the band worked to create a different sound, deciding to concentrate more on the country aspect of their music. They co-worked with singer-songwriter Gwyneth Glyn and pedal steel player Euron "Jos" Jones and released the single "Paid a Deud", also on the Sbrigyn Ymborth label. The title track is a re-working of a traditional Welsh folk song.

Summer 2009 saw Llyr Pari of labelmates Jen Jeniro join the band as an additional live guitarist, and played at their biggest summer appearances at the Wakestock festival and Maes B at the Eisteddfod.

2010 was a quieter year for the band in terms of live performances as they concentrated on writing new material. Over the summer a version of Neil Young's Cortez the Killer crept into the set. The band played the opening Sunday of the Royal Welsh's Young People's Village and the final Saturday of the National Eisteddfod's Maes B.

The band were subject to a profile in North Wales and Liverpool's Daily Post newspaper in September 2010, in which Ian Hughes described the band as producing "a sound so independent and divorced from music lazily being made by a lot of other new groups".

The band entered Bryn Derwen studio with producer and engineer Dave Wrench in September 2010. Once again Branwen "Sbrings" Williams, who had provided backing vocals on Dawns y Trychfilod, and Euron "Jos" Jones were in tow, as well as Llyr Pari, who had regularly been playing live with the brothers. The resulting album, Dyddiau Du, Dyddiau Gwyn, was released in December of that year and garnered widespread acclaim and airplay.

In 2011 the band had two new songs featured in the Y Record Goch compilation, released by new label Recordiau Lliwgar. They continued to perform regularly, including a slot at the Green Man Festival and, for the first time, shows outside Wales.

Third album Draw Dros y Mynydd was released in summer 2012 and was shortlisted for the Welsh Music Prize 2012.

In 2013 the band continued to tour widely, and appeared with new material on the S4C music series Y Stiwdio Gefn. A new song, Tyrd Olau Gwyn, appeared in the 9-track O'r Nyth compilation, released by Welsh label Nyth in December.

Their 2024 album Mynd â’r tŷ am dro won the Welsh Language Album of the Year award at the National Eisteddfod.

== Members ==
- Iwan Glyn Hughes – vocals, electric & acoustic guitar, keyboards, harmonica, banjo, bass guitar
- Dafydd Rhys Hughes – vocals, drums & percussion
- Aled Wyn Hughes – vocals, bass guitar, electric & acoustic guitar, vocoder, cosmic banjo
- Llyr "Tonto" Pari – electric guitar, bass guitar
- Branwen "Sbrings" Williams – vocals, organ
- Euron "Jos" Jones – pedal steel guitar, electric guitar, bass guitar
- Osian Huw Williams – vocals, electric guitar, bass guitar, percussion

== Discography ==
=== Albums ===
- Dawns y Trychfilod (Sbrigyn Ymborth) – 2007
- Dyddiau Du, Dyddiau Gwyn (Sbrigyn Ymborth) – 2010 (Wales) / 2011 (UK)
- Draw Dros y Mynydd (Sbrigyn Ymborth) – 2012
- IV (Sbrigyn Ymborth) – 2016
- Yn Fyw! Galeri Caernarfon (Sbrigyn Ymborth) – 2023
- Mynd â’r tŷ am dro (Sbrigyn Ymborth) – 2024
- Haul Bach (Sbrigyn Ymborth) – 2026

=== Singles ===
- "Paid a Deud" with Gwyneth Glyn (Sbrigyn Ymborth) – 2008
- "Clawdd Eithin / Adenydd" (Sbrigyn Ymborth) - 2023
- "Trosol" (Sbrigyn Ymborth) - 2024

=== EPs ===
- Y Cledrau with Karen Owen (BBC Sesiwn Unnos) – 2011
- Y Record Goch (10" vinyl & download) – compilation EP with Y Bwgan, Sen Segur and Dau Cefn (Recordiau Lliwgar) – 2011
