= Pont Rug (Halt) railway station =

Former railway station in Gwynedd, Wales

Pont Rug Halt

General information
- Location: Pont Rhythallt, Gwynedd; Wales
- Coordinates: 53.1445°N 4.2252°W
- Grid reference: SH 512 631
- Platforms: 1

Other information
- Status: Disused

History
- Original company: Carnarvon and Llanberis Railway
- Pre-grouping: London and North Western Railway
- Post-grouping: London Midland and Scottish Railway

Key dates
- 1 June 1880: Opened
- 1 January 1917: Closed as a wartime economy measure
- 1 July 1919: Reopened
- 22 September 1930: Closed completely
- 1964: line closed
Location

Pont Rug railway station was located to the east of Caernarfon, Gwynedd, Wales, where the A4086 crosses the Afon Seiont.

The station opened in 1880. It consisted of a single short platform with no goods facilities other than small parcels. It closed from January 1917 to July 1919 as a wartime economy measure, then closed completely in 1930.

Summer excursions to Llanberis passed through until September 1962 and freight lingered on until the line closed in September 1964. The tracks were lifted in early 1965.

Pont Rug was at the midpoint of a five-mile climb from Pont Seiont to Pontrhythallt, mostly at 1 in 62 or 1 in 68. In 1958 the station building was in use as a dwelling.

Preceding station	Historical railways	Following station
Caernarvon (Morfa); Line and station closed	Carnarvonshire Railway; Llanberis Branch	Pontrhythallt; Line and station closed
