= Pontrhythallt railway station =

Former railway station in Gwynedd, Wales

Pontrhythallt
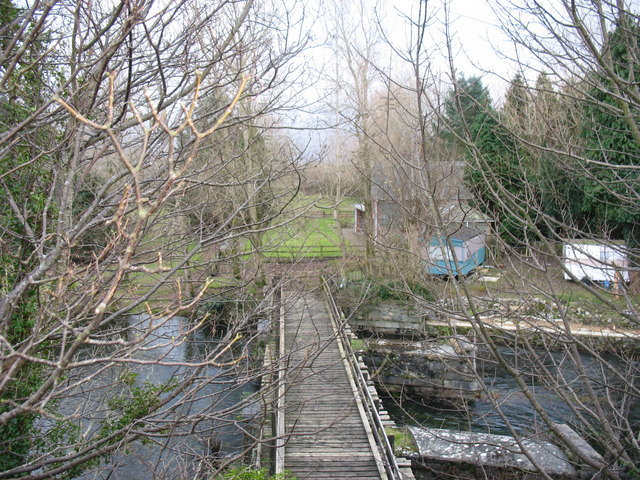
- The former railway bridge by the station

General information
- Location: Pont Rhythallt, Gwynedd; Wales
- Coordinates: 53.1502°N 4.1778°W
- Grid reference: SH 544 636
- Platforms: 1

Other information
- Status: Disused

History
- Original company: Carnarvon and Llanberis Railway
- Pre-grouping: London and North Western Railway
- Post-grouping: London Midland and Scottish Railway

Key dates
- October 1869: Opened
- 22 September 1930: Closed to regular passenger traffic
- September 1962: Excursions ceased
- 7 September 1964: Station closed to residual coal traffic
Location

Pontrhythallt was a railway station in the hamlet of Pont Rhythallt, Gwynedd, Wales. It was ½ mile from the village of Llanrug, to which it was connected by Station Road, and which it mostly served. This station opened in 1869 and closed for regular passenger services in 1930, but trains continued to pass through until the last goods train of all on 3 September 1964, which delivered a panel of lap fencing.

The station was at the end of a nearly five mile climb from crossing the Afon Seiont on the southern edge of Caernarfon. Pontrhythallt's "Home" signal was the first since leaving the town, 5.75 miles (9.25 km) earlier.

The 1939 Working timetable shows that some excursions made unadvertised stops at Pontrhythallt.

The line was lifted in early 1965. The station survives as a private dwelling. The bridge over the Afon Rhythallt immediately next to the station has lost its original railway decking, but has been replaced with a footbridge.

Preceding station	Historical railways	Following station
Pont Rug (Halt); Line and station closed	Carnarvonshire Railway; Llanberis Branch	Cwm-y-Glo; Line and station closed
