= Cwm-y-glo =

Coordinates: 53.141°N 4.166°W

Cwm-y-glo: Welsh: Cwm-y-glo
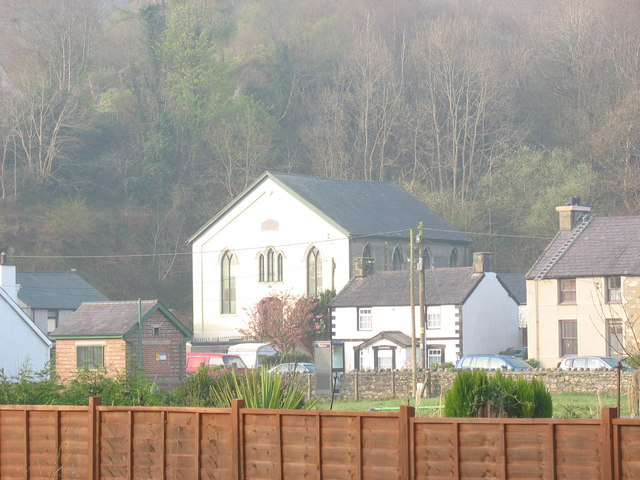
- Capel Tabernacl

- Location within Gwynedd
- Population: 995
- Language: Welsh (72.1%)
- OS grid reference: SH551626
- Community: Llanrug
- Principal area: Gwynedd
- Country: Wales
- Sovereign state: United Kingdom
- Post town: CAERNARFON
- Postcode district: LL55
- Dialling code: 01286
- Police: North Wales
- Fire: North Wales
- Ambulance: Welsh
- UK Parliament: Dwyfor Meirionnydd
- Senedd Cymru – Welsh Parliament: Arfon
- Website: https://llanrug.cymru/

Cwm-y-glo is a small village in Wales, 4 1/2 miles (7 km) east of Caernarfon, between Llanberis and Llanrug. It is in the Dwyfor Meirionnydd UK constituency, the community of Llanrug, and the Gwynedd Council electoral ward. Cwm-y-glo ward includes Ceunant and Pont-rug and has a population of around 1,000.

The focus of the village is on the original roadway, now bypassed by the A4086 road, which follows the approximate line of the former railway.

To the east of the village lies the flood plain of Afon Rhythallt (an extension of the Afon Seiont), and consequently some houses on the eastern side of the old road (which lie below the level of the main road) suffer flooding.

The village is mainly residential, but has several shops and small businesses. Menter Fachwen is a local charity offering work to adults with disabilities.

The community is policed by Llanberis and has a dedicated Community Beat Manager.

== History ==
The origin of the village's name ("Valley of Coal") lies in its connection with the extensive slate industries which thrived in the valley in the 18th, 19th, and early 20th centuries. The area was home to the charcoal sub-industry, which the foundries at the various quarries depended on to fabricate iron to support the slate industry.

On 30 June 1869, two carts carrying nitroglycerine explosive collided in the village; the resulting explosion killed the carters as well as three others and injured a further eight. The explosion was at the time believed to be the loudest manmade explosion ever, and the debris, allegedly including a cart wheel, was thrown as far as the next village, Brynrefail. To this day, an X is inscribed on a wall at Clegir along the old road between Bryn Bras Castle and Llanberis, marking the spot where a wheel and harness from one of the carts was flung. In April 2008, a plaque commemorating the tragedy was unveiled on the rock face opposite Y Fricsan, the village pub.

Between 1865 and 1965, an LNWR 8-mile (13 km) branch railway line, established by the Caernarvon and Llanberis Railway Act 1864, ran through the village from Llanberis to Caernarfon, but there are no longer any visible remains of Cwm-y-glo railway station.
