= Carnarvon and Llanberis Railway =

UK railway branch line

Overview
- Termini: Caernarfon; Llanberis

Service
- Operator(s): London and North Western Railway 1869-1923; London Midland and Scottish Railway 1923-1948; British Railways 1948-1964

History
- Opened: 1 July 1869
- Closed: 20 October 1964

Technical
- Line length: 8 mi (13 km)
- Track gauge: 1,435 mm (4 ft 8 1/2 in) standard gauge

Caernarvon and Llanberis Railway Act 1864
- Act of Parliament
- Parliament of the United Kingdom
- Long title: An Act to authorize the Construction of a Railway from Carnarvon to Llanberis in the County of Carnarvon.
- Citation: 27 & 28 Vict. c. clxxxvi

Dates
- Royal assent: 14 July 1864

Text of statute as originally enacted

The Carnarvon and Llanberis Railway, built under the Caernarvon and Llanberis Railway Act 1864 (27 & 28 Vict. c. clxxxvi), was an eight-mile branch line from the Carnarvonshire Railway running from Caernarfon to Llanberis, via Pont Rhythallt (for Llanrug), Cwm-y-Glo, and Padarn Halt.

== History ==
The Carnarvon and Llanberis railway bill passed through Parliament in 1864. The estimated cost of construction of the line 8 miles (13 km) long was £110,000 (equivalent to £12,083,726 in 2025).

Construction started on 15 September 1864 when the first sod was cut by the Hon. Emily Wynne of Glynllifon, daughter of Spencer Bulkeley Wynn, 3rd Baron Newborough. The event was marked with a procession of 700 children with the Llanrug Brass Band, and the Revd. W. Lloyd William, vicar of St Padarn's Church, Llanberis. The plan was for the railway to be operated by the London and North Western Railway.

The railway opened on 1 July 1869 but was overshadowed by a nitro-glycerine explosion at a quarry near Cwm-y-Glo railway station which resulted in 5 deaths and 12 severe injuries.

The line from Llanberis to Caernarfon was built from Llanberis towards Caernarfon. For a while the railway terminated at Caernarvon (Morfa) railway station. When the "Caernarfon Town Line" was built through a tunnel under the centre to join the various routes. Morfa station was closed on 5 July 1870, though it appears that formal paperwork was not concluded until the following January.

In 1870 the London and North Western Railway took full ownership of the line, and the Carnarvon and Llanberis Railway Company was dissolved.

The railway was initially built as a local link between villages, serving the local population. However tourist traffic increased hugely after the Snowdon Mountain Railway opened in 1897.

== Accidents ==
On 25 August 1872 the market train from Llanberis was approaching Carnarvon when it was run into by a ballast engine. A second class carriage received the full shock of the ballast engine and was knocked to pieces. The two passengers aboard were uninjured.

== Closure and traces of the railway ==
The station closed for regular passenger services in 1930 but was still used by summer excursion trains until 7 September 1962 and freight services until 3 September 1964.

The last fare-paying passenger service was an enthusiasts' special on 20 October 1964. The line was lifted in 1965.

Some evidence of the railbed still exists. The site of the track in Llanberis now carries the A4086 road where it by-passes the village along the lakeshore, and the former station is occupied by a craft centre. An area known locally as the Sidings on the shores of Llyn Padarn also shows some evidence of its past. The next section of railbed runs alongside the lake and is now the Lon Las Peris ("Peris Green Lane") cycle path., There is also evidence of the former railway on bridges and a tunnel near Cwm-y-glo, near Llwyncoed Farm - mentioned in the song Tylluanod ("Owls") by the local band Hogia'r Wyddfa ("Snowdon Lads") in 1969. The railbed then follows the line of the A4086 through Cwm-y-glo past Y Fricsan Inn, the site of Cwm-y-Glo railway station. It then follows the River Seiont downstream for the rest of its route to Caernarfon.

== Sources ==
- Johnson, Peter (1995). North Wales (Celebration of Steam). Shepperton: Ian Allan Publishing. ISBN 0-7110-2378-6.
- Kneale, E.N. (1980). North Wales Steam, 1927-68. Poole, Dorset: Oxford Publishing Co. ISBN 0-86093-074-2.
- Quick, Michael (2009) [2001]. Railway passenger stations in Great Britain: a chronology (4th ed.). Oxford: Railway & Canal Historical Society. ISBN 978-0-901461-57-5. OCLC 612226077.
- Rear, W.G. (1979). London Midland steam in North Wales. Truro: D Bradford Barton Ltd. ISBN 0-85153-225-X.
- Rear, W.G. (2012). Caernarvon & the Lines from Afonwen & Llanberis: 28: Scenes from the Past Railways of North Wales. Nottingham: Book Law Publications. ISBN 9-781907-094781.
- Shannon, Paul; Hillmer, John (1999). North Wales (British Railways Past & Present) Part 2. Kettering: Past & Present Publishing Ltd. ISBN 1-85895-163-1. No 36.
