= Cwm-y-Glo railway station =

Former railway station in Gwynedd, Wales

Cwm-y-Glo
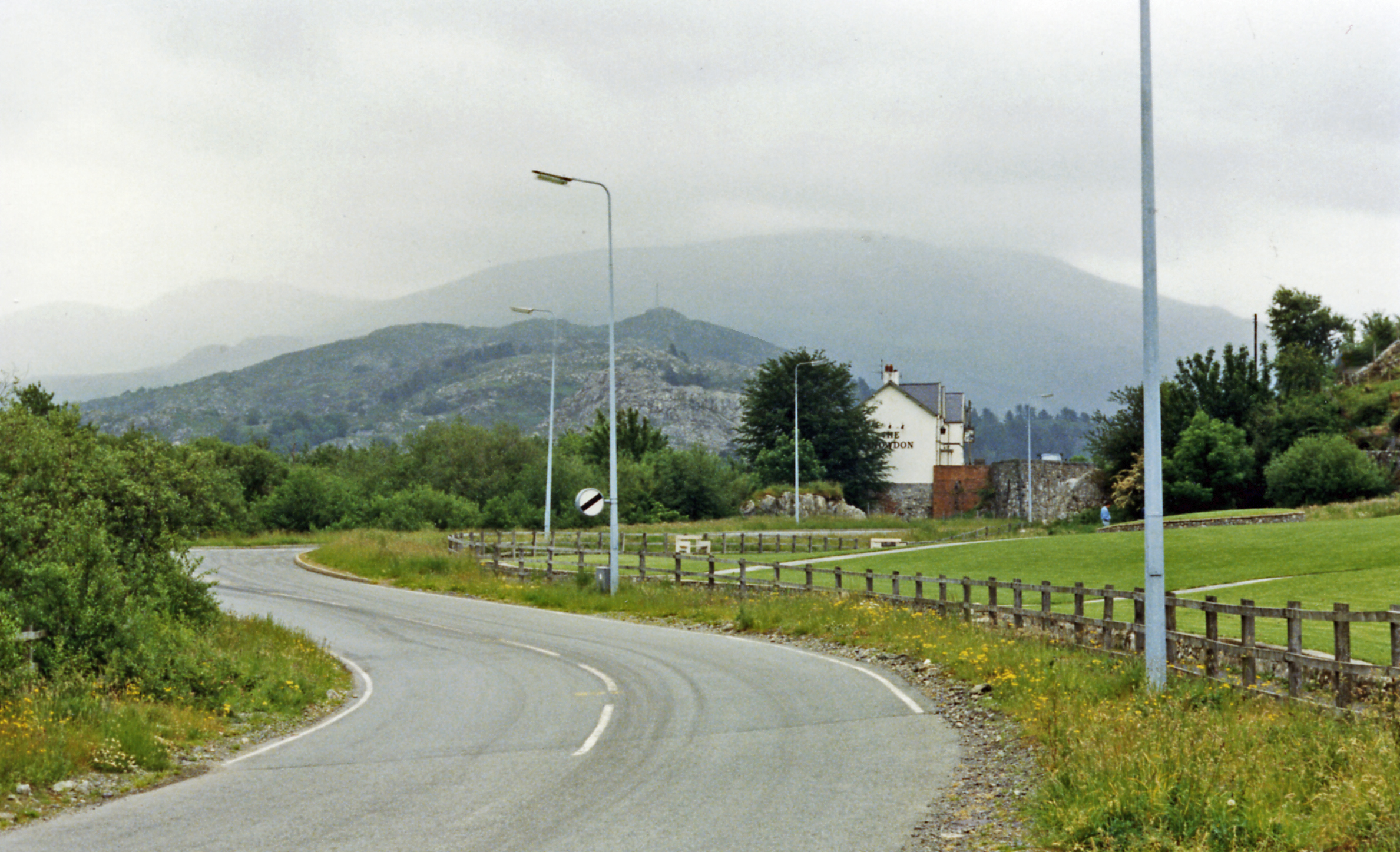
- Location of the station (1986)

General information
- Location: Gwynedd; Wales
- Coordinates: 53.1385°N 4.1610°W
- Grid reference: SH 555 623
- Platforms: 1

Other information
- Status: Disused

History
- Original company: Carnarvon and Llanberis Railway
- Pre-grouping: London and North Western Railway
- Post-grouping: London Midland and Scottish Railway

Key dates
- 1 July 1869: Opened
- 22 September 1930: Closed to regular passenger traffic
- September 1962: Excursions ceased
Location

Cwm-y-Glo railway station served the village of Cwm-y-glo, Gwynedd, Wales, at the north-west end of Llyn Padarn. The station was closed for regular passenger services in 1930 but trains passed through until September 1964.

The station lay on the nine mile LNWR branch line between Caernarfon and Llanberis which was established by the Caernarvon and Llanberis Railway Act 1864 (27 & 28 Vict. c. clxxxvi).

The summer 1939 working timetable shows that some excursions made unadvertised stops at the station.

The station was demolished in the 1970s when the realigned A4086 was built along the trackbed. A public house called the Railway Inn is all that remains of the station as was, this pub is now known as Y Fricsan.

Preceding station	Historical railways	Following station
Pontrhythallt; Line and station closed	Carnarvonshire Railway; Llanberis Branch	Padarn Halt; Line and station closed

== Further material ==
- Kneale, E.N. (1986). North Wales Steam: v. 2. Poole: Oxford Publishing Co. ISBN 978-0-86093-305-2.
