= Padarn Halt railway station =

Former railway station in Gwynedd, Wales

Padarn Halt

General information
- Location: Llanberis, Gwynedd; Wales
- Coordinates: 53.1218°N 4.1270°W
- Grid reference: SH 577 604
- Platforms: 1

Other information
- Status: Disused

History
- Original company: LMSR

Key dates
- 21 November 1936: Opened
- 12 September 1939: Closed
Location

Padarn Halt was a passenger only railway station located in Llanberis, Gwynedd, Wales, on the western shore of Llyn Padarn. It opened on 21 November 1936 and closed on the outbreak of the Second World War. The line through the station remained in use for excursions until 1962 and for freight until 1964; it was lifted in 1965.

The LMSR closed the Llanberis branch to regular passenger services in 1930, though frequent Summer excursions continued to run. In 1934 the company reinstated a regular Saturdays only train specifically to serve Caernarfon market. In many parts of Britain "Market Trains" were an established part of local commerce and social life in a way which has passed into history. Llanberis station was not in the centre of Llanberis, so the company built the halt half a mile from the terminus specifically for this market traffic. The halt opened on 21 November 1936, from which time the market trains used the halt there instead of at Llanberis station. The halt consisted of an unlit single wooden platform on trestles, with a very small wooden waiting shelter at its southern end. It was accessed by a gravel footpath which continued over the tracks to the lakeside by a foot crossing.

The 1939 working timetable shows that some excursions made unadvertised stops at the halt.

The track bed from Llanberis through the site of the halt (at what is now the lakeside entrance to the industrial estate) as far as Cwm-y-Glo is now occupied by the improved A4086, which by-passes the centre of Llanberis. No trace of the station remains.

Preceding station	Historical railways	Following station
Cwm-y-Glo; Line and station closed	Carnarvonshire Railway; Llanberis Branch	Llanberis; Line and station closed
