= Dinas Cromlech =

Rock climbing crag, Wales

- Dinas y Gromlech
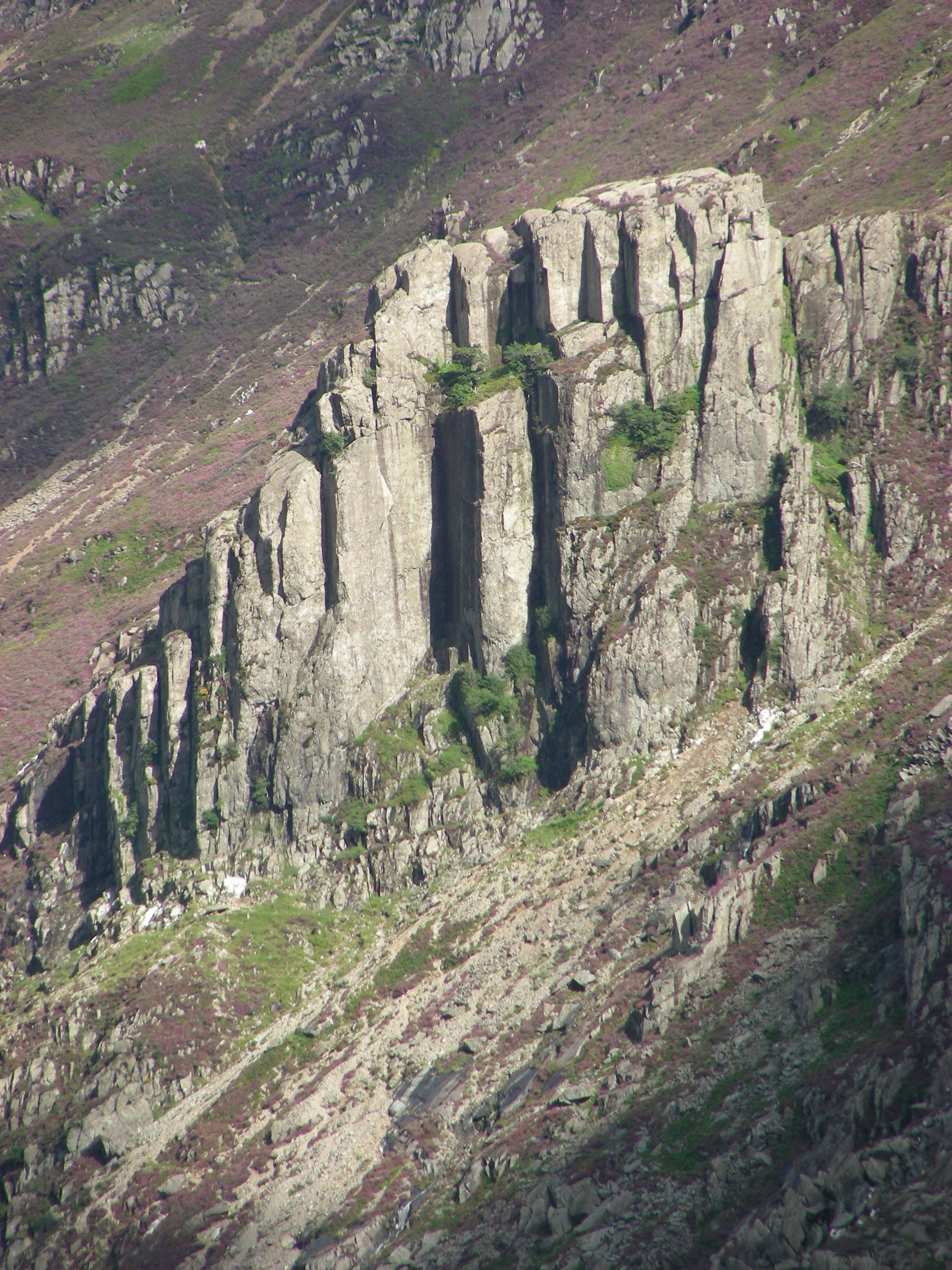
- "Open Book" shape of Dinas Cromlech

- Location within Wales
- Location: Llanberis Pass, Snowdonia, Wales
- Nearest city: Bangor, Gwynedd
- Range: Snowdon Massif
- Coordinates: 53.0921°N 4.0476°W
- Type of climbing: Traditional climbing
- Height range: up to 40 metres (130 ft)
- Pitches range: Mostly single-pitch
- Technical grades: rock grades of Diff to E9; most are VS to E2
- Rock type: Rhyolite
- Quantity of routes: +80 routes
- Cliff aspect: South
- Elevation: 500 metres (1,600 ft) a.s.l.
- Classic climbs: Lord of the Flies (E6 6a), Right Wall (E5 6a), Left Wall (E2 5c), Cenotaph Corner (E1 5c), Cemetry Gates (E1 5b), Noah's Warning (VS 5a); Sabre Cut (VS 4c); Flying Buttress (VDiff)

Dinas Cromlech or Dinas y Gromlech is a distinctive rhyolite rock outcrop at the Llanberis Pass, in Snowdonia, northwest Wales, which has a distinctive "open book" shape that is clearly visible from the road (A4086), and is very popular location for rock climbers and contains some of Britain's most famous and notable rock climbing routes, several of which are important in the history of rock climbing.

== Climbing history ==
The obvious traditional climbing route up the deep ninety-degree angled corner resisted attempts for many years until it was climbed by Joe Brown in 1952, and called Cenotaph Corner (1952, E1 5c, with Doug Belshaw), and is regarded as one of Britain's most famous rock climbing routes.

The outcrop is an important rock climbing venue in Britain, and the corner includes some of the famous traditional climbing routes in British rock climbing history, including Cemetery Gates (E1 5b) by Don Whillans in 1951, Left Wall (E2 5c) by Ron Moseley in 1956, Right Wall (E5 6c) by Pete Livesey in 1974, and Lord of the Flies (E6 6a) by Ron Fawcett in 1979. It also includes some of the most intimidating traditional climbs in Britain, such as Steve Mayer's 1992 climb, Nightmayer (E8 6c), from which climbers risk very large falls.

== In popular culture ==
In fiction, the travel writer Eric Newby gives a comic description of his first climb - and almost his only training in mountaineering - at the outcrop, the 'Spiral Stairs’. This is often referred to as Ivy Sepulchre but careful reading of Newby’s vague text will clearly show that this was indeed Spiral Stairs.He was led we are told by two expert waitresses from the inn where he is staying, in his book A Short Walk in the Hindu Kush.

== Filmography ==
- Fawcett FFA of Lord of the Flies (E6 6a): Sid Perou (director) (1980). First Ascent (Episode 3) (Motion picture). BBC.

== Bibliography ==
- North Wales Classics (Jack Geldard), 2010, Rockfax. ISBN 978-1-873341-17-9.
- North Wales Climbs (Mark Reeves, Jack Geldard, Mark Glaister), 2013, Rockfax. ISBN 978-1-873341-82-7.

== See also ==
- Clogwyn Du'r Arddu, a mountain crag in Snowdonia
- Dinorwic quarry, a slate climbing area near Llanberis
- History of rock climbing
