= Dolbadarn Castle =

Castle in Gwynedd, Wales

- Castell Dolbadarn (Welsh) (Note: Since 2024, Cadw, who maintain the site, use the Welsh name only.)
- Gwynedd, Wales
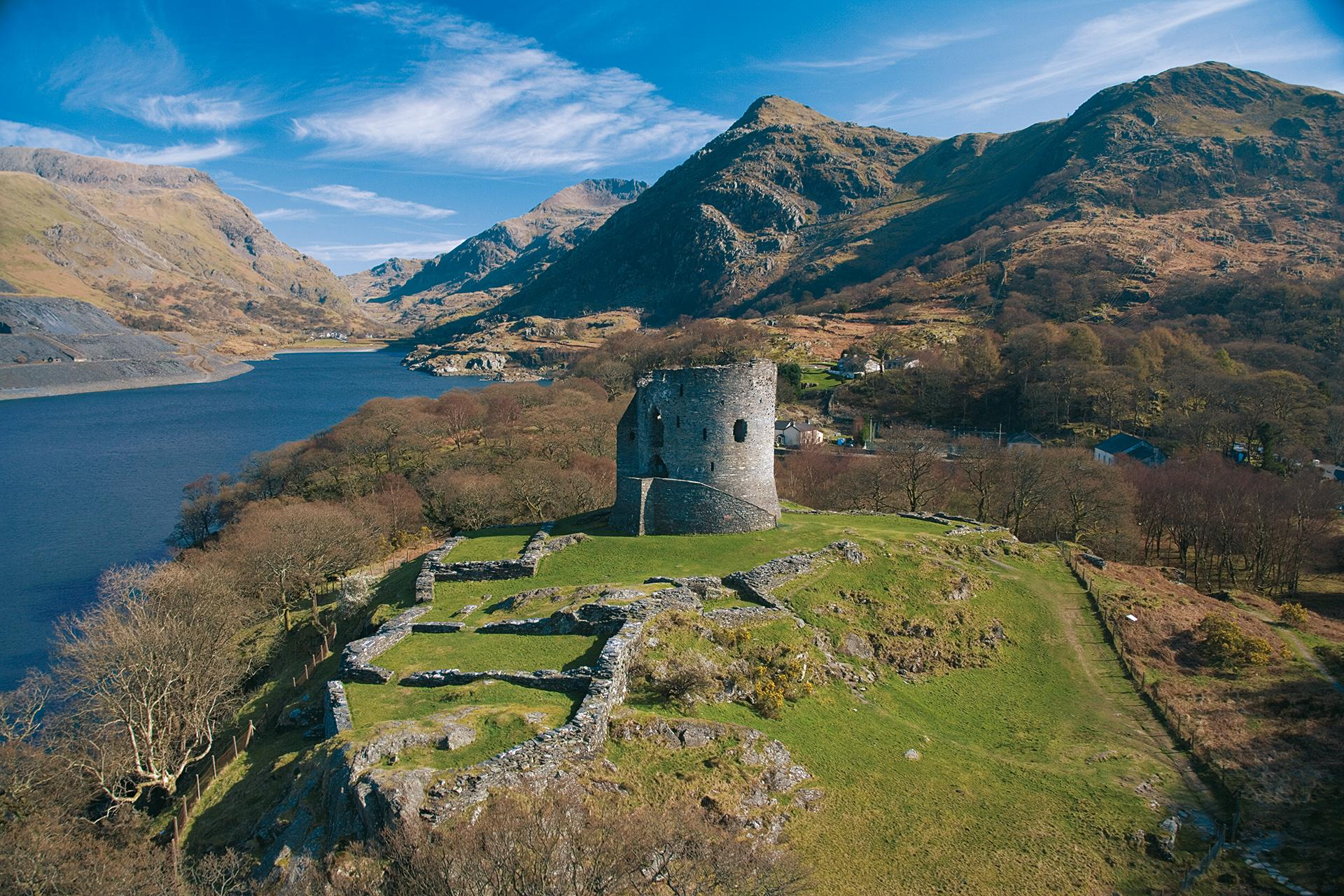
- Dolbadarn Castle

Site information
- Owner: Cadw
- Open to the public: Yes
- Condition: Ruined
- Website: Castell Dolbadarn (Cadw)

Location
- Dolbadarn Castle, shown within Wales
- Location within Wales
- Coordinates: 53.1166°N 4.1142°W
- Grid reference: grid reference SH586598

Site history
- Built: Early 13th century
- Built by: Llywelyn the Great
- Materials: Slate stone
- Events: 1283 invasion of North Wales

Listed Building – Grade I

Dolbadarn Castle (English: /dɒlˈbædɑːn/ dol-BAD-an; Welsh: Castell Dolbadarn; Welsh pronunciation: [kastɛɬ dɔl'badarn]) is a fortification built by the Welsh prince Llywelyn the Great during the early 13th century, at the base of the Llanberis Pass, in northern Wales. The castle was important both militarily and as a symbol of Llywelyn's power and authority. The castle features a large stone keep, which historian Richard Avent considers "the finest surviving example of a Welsh round tower". In 1284 Dolbadarn was taken by Edward I, who removed some of its timbers to build his new castle at Caernarfon. The castle was used as a manor house for some years, before falling into ruin. In the 18th and 19th centuries, it was a popular destination for painters interested in Sublime and Picturesque landscapes. It is now owned by Cadw and managed as a tourist attraction, and is protected as a grade I listed building.

== History ==
=== 1220–40 ===
Dolbadarn Castle was built in either the 1220s or the 1230s by Llywelyn the Great, at the base of the Llanberis Pass, overlooking the lake of Llyn Padarn in northern Wales. Traditionally the Welsh princes had not constructed castles, instead using undefended palaces called llysoedd, or courts. From the late 11th century onwards, the Normans had advanced into Wales, taking lands in the north and establishing a band of occupied territory in the south called the Welsh Marches. During the 12th century, some timber and earthwork castles began to be built but in small numbers.

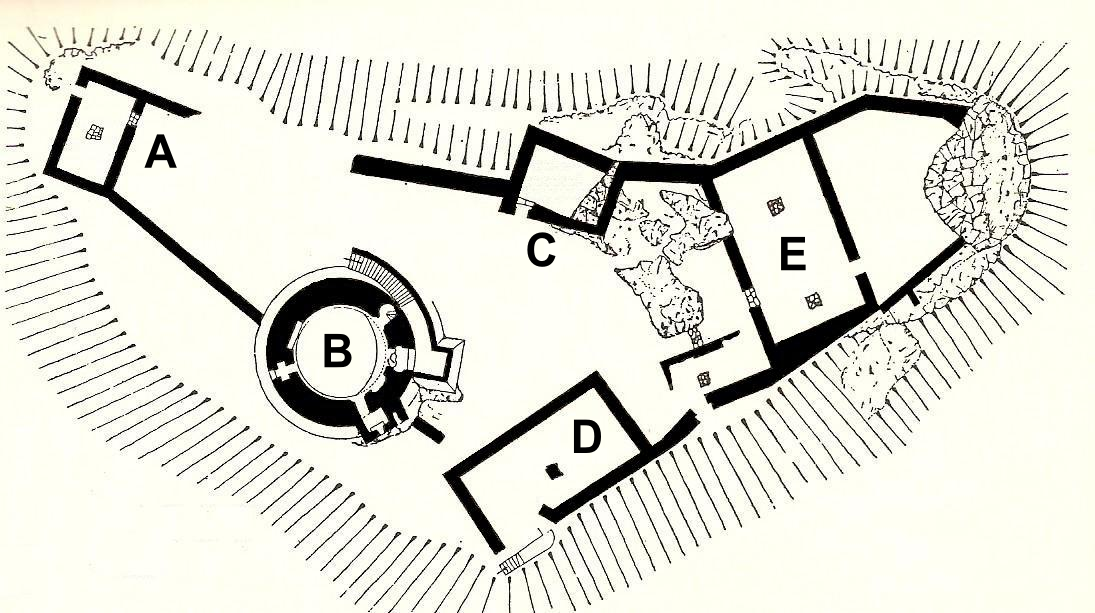
Plan of the castle: A – South Tower; B – Keep; C – West Tower; D – East Building; E – Hall

Llywelyn the Great initially controlled the princedom of Gwynedd, but grew more powerful throughout his reign, extending his influence over much of Wales during the early years of the 13th century. Llywelyn was faced with several challenges, including dealing with the threat from the kings of England and maintaining his authority over the native Welsh. As part of this strategy, Llywelyn built Castell y Bere, an innovative stone Welsh castle, in the 1220s. Shortly afterward he began the first phases of Dolbadarn Castle, constructing the initial stone fortifications on the site, including two square stone towers.

The location of the castle was important both because it controlled an important mountain pass, and possibly because Llywelyn claimed authority as the lord of the mountains and coasts of Wales: several of his castles appear to have been located with such political symbolism in mind. It is also possible that Llywelyn may have built his castle on top of the remains of a previous fortification constructed by Maelgwn Gwynedd, a king of Gwynedd in the 6th century, although no such remains have been found.

As part of his strategy for dealing with the Marcher Lords, Llywelyn married his eldest son, Dafydd, to Isabella, the daughter of William de Braose, a powerful lord in Brecon, Builth and Abergavenny. The Marcher Lords had adopted a style of the stone castle that included circular keeps and an integrated system of curtain walls. Following Dafydd's marriage, Llywelyn appears to have started a second phase of building at Dolbadarn, probably in the 1240s, adding these elements to the existing castle. The prince was probably aiming not only to incorporate the latest military technology but also to create a castle of equal prestige to those of his new allies in the south. (Note: The interpretation of Dolbadarn, like other Norman and Welsh castles, has shifted over time. Post-war historians such as R. Allen Brown focused on the military advantages of circular keeps, ascribing the design at Dolbadarn to the increased military competition in Wales during the period. Similarly, Cathcart King saw the keep as being "very well developed", noting that it "might pass for an English addition". Richard Avent's later work on the social and political aspects of these princely castles has led to a more multi-faceted interpretation.) Traditionally the surrounding district of Is Gwyrfai had been run from the town of Llanbeblig; after the 1240s, this role was transferred to Dolbadarn.

=== 1240–1300 ===
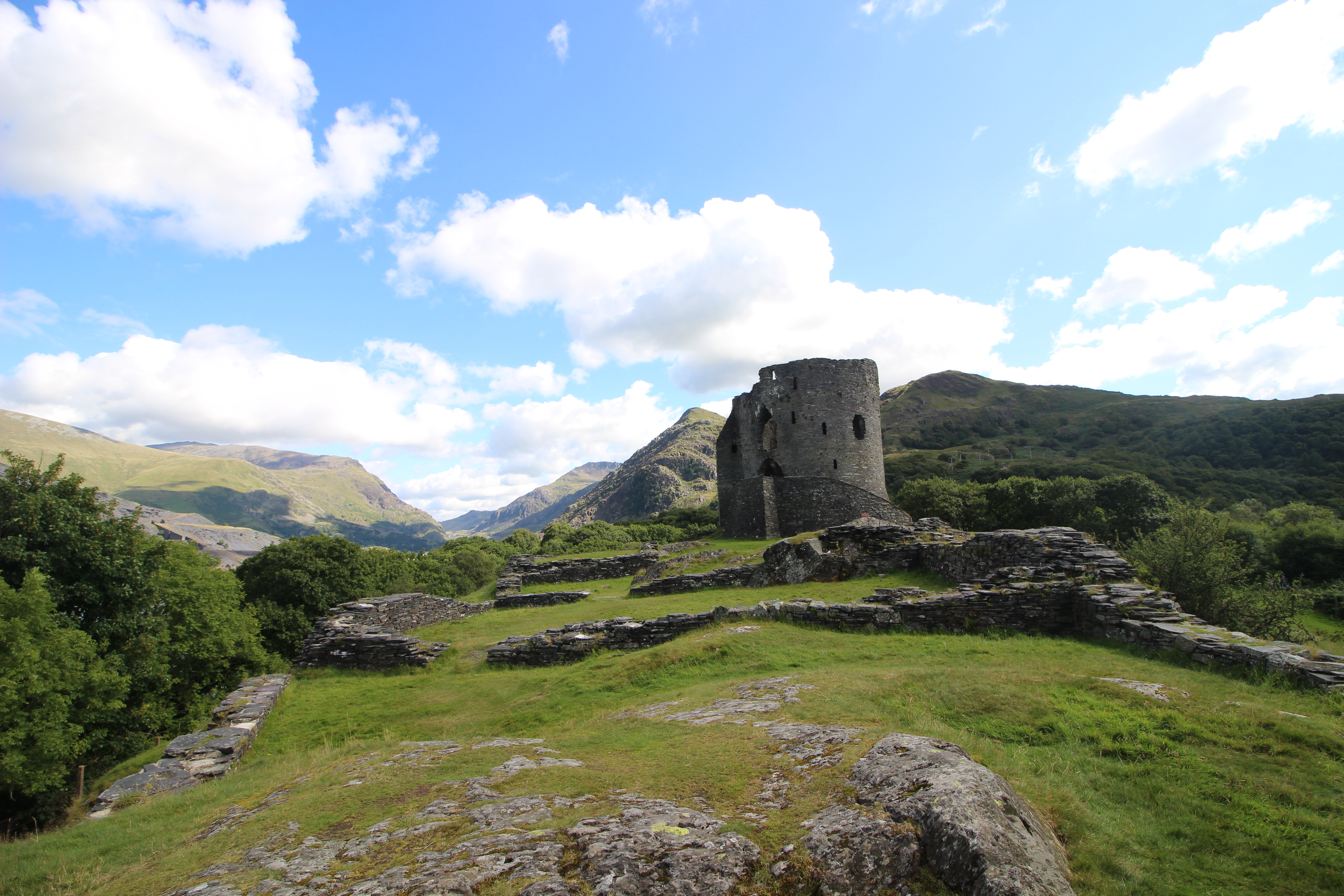
The keep, seen across the hall and courtyard

Following Llywelyn's death in 1240, Gwynedd's power declined and many of its eastern lands were taken by Henry III of England in 1247. Llywelyn's grandson, Llywelyn ap Gruffudd, took power in 1255 and imprisoned his brother Owain ap Gruffudd before extending his power across Wales. Owain was eventually released in 1277 and there has been much historical debate over which castle he was held in. Hywel Foel ap Griffri wrote a famous poem describing Owain's long imprisonment in a round tower; historians believe that this refers to the keep at Dolbardarn.

The conflict between the Welsh princes and the English kings continued during the reign of Edward I. In 1282 Llywelyn fought a final campaign against Edward, ending in the prince's death near Builth that December. His brother, Dafydd ap Gruffydd, assumed power but during 1283 was forced south into Snowdonia and by May his government was based from Dolbadarn Castle. Edward deployed 7,000 troops to detain Dafydd who was finally captured and executed in October; Dolbadarn was occupied by Norman forces.

Edward was determined to prevent any further rebellion in North Wales and set about building a sequence of new castles and walled towns, replacing the old Welsh administrative system with a new principality governed from Caernarfon. Dolbadarn was no longer relevant and within two years timber from the castle was being used by the Normans for the construction of Caernarfon Castle. This was both a practical and symbolic action, demonstrating Norman power over one of the most important possessions of the Welsh princes.

=== 14th – 21st centuries ===
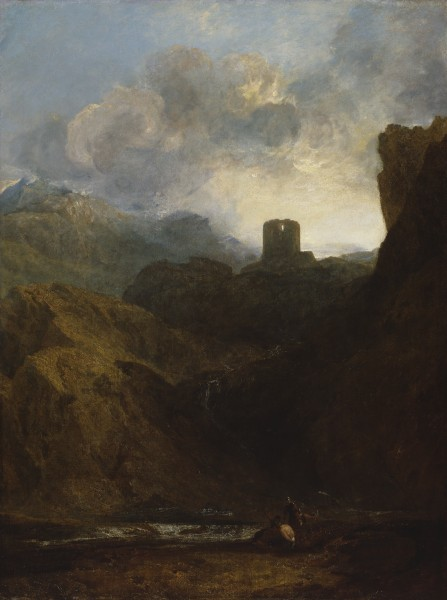
J. M. W. Turner's painting Dolbadarn Castle, 1800.

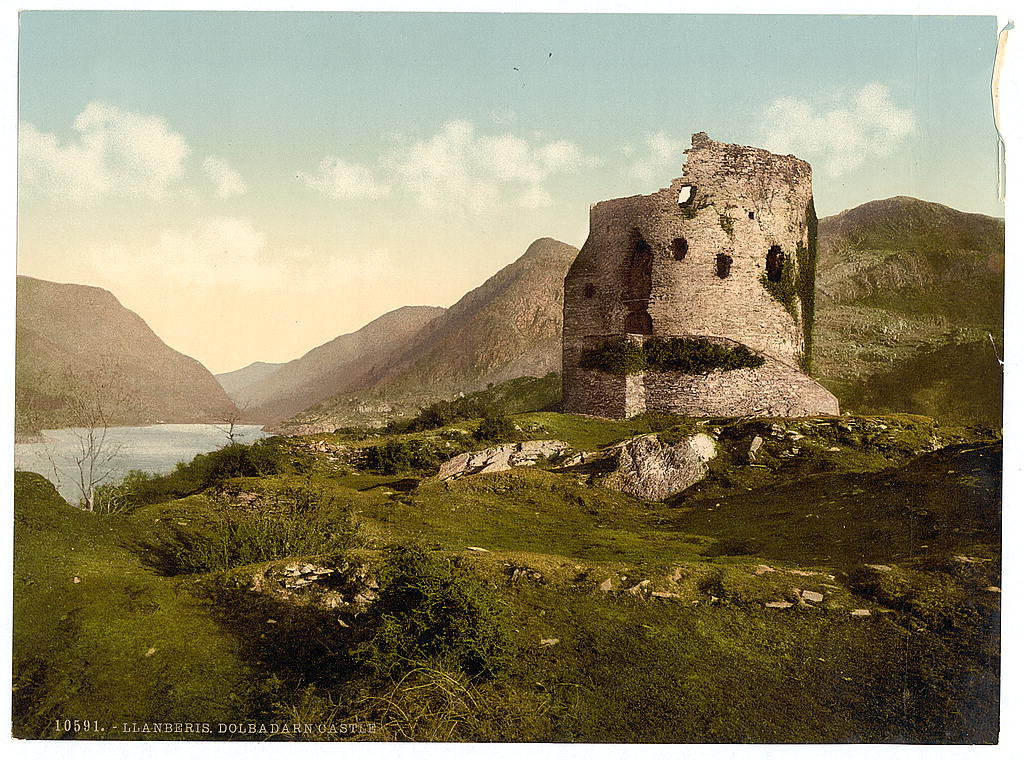
"Dolbadarn Castle, Llanberis, Wales", ca. 1890 - 1900.

The remaining parts of the castle continued to be used as a manor house into the 14th century. By the 18th century, however, Dolbadarn Castle was ruined and uninhabited. From the 1760s onwards, however, it became a popular topic for painters interested in the then fashionable landscape styles of the Sublime and the Picturesque. Typically the castle was painted in the middle ground, allowing the viewer's eye to contrast its ruined outline with the lakes and mountains of Snowdonia; frequently the landscape was misrepresented by the artist, to create a more striking or dramatic effect. J. M. W. Turner's 1800 work Dolbadarn Castle depicted the back-lit castle looming over the landscape and became particularly famous, but the paintings of the castle by Richard Wilson and Paul Sandby also represent important artistic works of the period.

In 1941 the castle was given to the State by Sir Michael Duff. It is now maintained by Cadw and is protected as a Grade I listed building and as a scheduled monument. In the light of Welsh devolution and other political changes, the history of Dolbadarn Castle and similar Welsh castles has become increasingly prominent. In response, Cadw noted that they intend to give increased priority to communicating the history of these castles and the Welsh princes. Since 2024, Cadw have used the Welsh name Castell Dolbadarn in English.

== Architecture ==
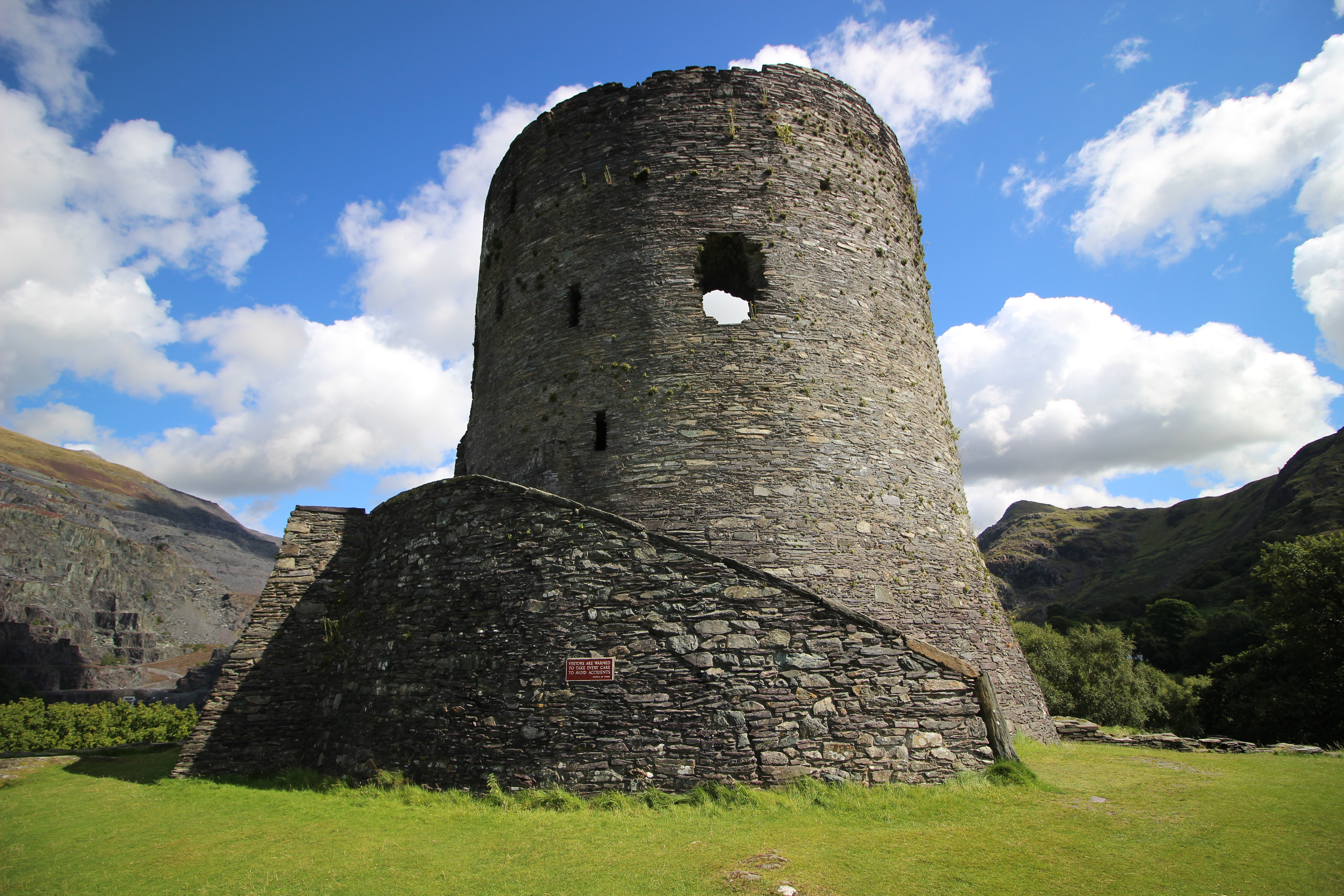
The castle seen from the north-west, showing (near to far) the hall, the courtyard, the west tower, the east building, the keep, and the south tower

Dolbadarn Castle comprises a courtyard, surrounded by several towers and a round keep. The castle is built from purple and green slate stone, mainly constructed in a dry stone fashion without mortar, except the keep. The courtyard follows the natural shape of the hill and is protected by a curtain wall; originally perhaps 15 feet (5 m) high, it is now only at most 3 feet (1 m) high. Of the castle buildings, only the keep remains at any significant height.

The keep today is 46 feet (14 m) high and is modelled on early 13th-century English round towers built in the south of the Welsh Marches. As with other Welsh-constructed towers, the entrance is on the first story, not at ground level; it may originally have been protected by a porch. The keep had a portcullis which would have been drawn up past the window on the second story of the tower. While the castle's flooring has long since disappeared, its interior staircase to the upper story may still be climbed. This second story would have formed the main chamber in the keep and had a large fireplace and a latrine. Originally the keep would have had a parapet and battlements, since destroyed. Historian Richard Avent considers it "the finest surviving example of a Welsh round tower".

The rectangular west tower was a relatively short defensive structure, designed to protect the more vulnerable western slope of the ridge. A similar tower in the south overlooks the entrance to the castle. At the north end of the castle is the hall, stretching across the courtyard; in the east corner is an additional building, probably built by the English at the end of the 13th century. Although the hall is relatively large, 50 by 27 feet (15 by 8 m), these buildings follow a simpler design than those current in England at the time, where a combination of a hall, chamber, and a service block in castles was becoming more common.

== See also ==
- Castles in Great Britain and Ireland
- List of castles in Wales

== Bibliography ==
- Andrews, Malcolm. (1989) The Search for the Picturesque. Stanford, US: Stanford University Press. ISBN 978-0-8047-1402-0.
- Avent, Richard. (2010) Dolwyddelan Castle, Dolbadarn Castle, Castel y Bere. Cardiff: Cadw. ISBN 978-1-85760-205-0.
- Brown, R. Allen. (1962) English Castles. London: Batsford. OCLC 1392314
- Butler, Lawrence. (2010) "The Castles of the Princes of Gwynedd," in Williams and Kenyon (eds) (2010).
- Crouch, David. (1992) The Image of Aristocracy in Britain, 1000–1300. London: Routledge. ISBN 978-0-415-01911-8.
- Emery, Anthony. (2000) Greater Medieval Houses of England and Wales, 1300–1500: East Anglia, Central England, and Wales. Cambridge: Cambridge University Press. ISBN 978-0-521-58131-8.
- Jones, Alan Ffred. (2010) "King Edward' I's Castles in North Wales – Now and Tomorrow," in Williams and Kenyon (eds) (2010).
- King, D. J. Cathcart. (1991) The Castle in England and Wales: An Interpretative History. London: Routledge. ISBN 0-415-00350-4.
- Morgan, Gerald. (2008) Castles in Wales: A Handbook. Y Lolfa. ISBN 9781847710314.
- Williams, Diane M. and John R. Kenyon. (eds) (2010) The Impact of the Edwardian Castles in Wales. Oxford: Oxbow Books. ISBN 978-1-84217-380-0.
