= Aber Afon Seiont =

Protected area in Gwynedd, Wales

Afon Seiont
- Site of Special Scientific Interest
- Location within Wales
- Location of Afon Seiont.
- Area of search: West Gwynedd
- Grid reference: SH4796462079
- Coordinates: 53.134121°N 4.2740644°W
- Interest: Geological
- Area: 6.4 ha (16 acres)
- Notification date: 1997

Afon Seiont is a Site of Special Scientific Interest (or SSSI) in West Gwynedd, Wales. It is protected by law and has been designated as a Site of Special Scientific Interest since July 1997 in an attempt to protect rare or unique features or species within it. The site has an area of 6.4 hectares and is managed by Natural Resources Wales. This site is designated due to its geological qualities. In Wales, geological sites range from quarries to rocky outcrops and massive sea-cliffs. 30% of SSSIs in Wales are notified for geological and geomorphological features.

River Seiont is a small river which flows to the sea at Caenarfon, North Wales. Gwynedd County Council and Caernarfon Harbour Trust own this site, with no public access. The west river bank, and also in a past river cliff located 200m inland, is of particular interest for strata. The exposed rocks include the Arenig and overlying Llanvirn series.

== See also ==
- National nature reserves in Wales
- List of Ramsar sites in Wales
