= Caernarvon (Morfa) railway station =

Disused railway station in Wales

Caernarvon (Morfa)

General information
- Location: Caernarfon, Gwynedd; Wales
- Coordinates: 53.1304°N 4.2684°W
- Grid reference: SH 483 616
- Platforms: 1

Other information
- Status: Disused

History
- Original company: Carnarvon and Llanberis Railway
- Pre-grouping: London and North Western Railway

Key dates
- 1 July 1869 or October 1869: Opened
- 3 January 1871 or 5 July 1870: Closed, replaced by Carnarvon
Location

Caernarvon (Morfa) was the temporary western terminus of the Carnarvon and Llanberis Railway, located on the southern fringe of Caernarfon, Gwynedd, Wales.

The line from Llanberis to Caernarfon was built from the country end, as were the other standard gauge routes to the town, resulting in there being three temporary termini on the edges of Caernarfon. This was eventually resolved by building the "Caernarfon Town Line" through a tunnel under the historic centre to join the various routes. When this was opened, Morfa station was closed on 5 July 1870, though it appears that formal paperwork was not concluded until the following January. Freight and passenger trains passed through the station site until 1930, when regular passenger services were withdrawn.

Summer excursions to Llanberis passed through until September 1962 and freight lingered on until the line closed in 1964. The tracks were lifted in early 1965.

Preceding station	Historical railways	Following station
Terminus	Carnarvonshire Railway; Llanberis Branch	Pont Rug (Halt); Line and station closed
