= Ron Fawcett =

British rock climber

Personal information
- Nationality: British
- Born: 6 May 1955 (age 71) Embsay, North Riding of Yorkshire, England.
- Occupation: Professional rock climber
- Height: 6 ft 3 in (191 cm)

Climbing career
- Type of climber: Sport climbing, Traditional climbing, Bouldering, Free solo climbing
- Highest grade: Redpoint: 8a+ (5.13c); Bouldering: 8A (V11); Free solo: E6 6a 6c+ (5.11b/c)
- First ascents: Strawberries (E6 6b); Lord of the Flies (E6 6a); Tequila Mockingbird (E6 6c); The Prow F7c (5.12d)
- Major ascents: Master's Edge (E7 6b/c); Free solo of 100 E-grade routes in a single day
- Known for: Pioneer professional British rock climber
- Updated on 26 March 2023

Ron Fawcett (born 6 May 1955) is a British rock climber and rock climbing author who is credited with pushing the technical standards of British rock climbing in traditional, sport, bouldering and free soloing disciplines, in the decade from the mid-1970s to the mid-1980s, and of pioneering the career of being a full-time professional rock climber. At the end of the 1970s to the early 1980s, Fawcett was widely considered the best and most notable rock climber in Britain.

== Climbing career ==
Fawcett is considered as a legend of British rock climbing, and a prolific developer of challenging new routes that attracted international recognition. By the start of the 1980s, Fawcett was considered the most famous rock climber in Britain, with a reputation for high levels of fitness and mental fortitude. He produced bold routes that embraced both traditional climbing and early sport climbing techniques, and that are still considered test-pieces for rock climbers.

Fawcett's dominance of British rock climbing from the mid-1970s followed on from British climber Pete Livesey, with whom Fawcett had an unusual friend–rival relationship; Livesey was Fawcett's early climbing mentor and climbing partner. Fawcett's dominance waned during the mid-1980s, as emerging British climbers such as Jerry Moffatt and Ben Moon began to push technical levels not just in British climbing, but in international sport climbing.

Fawcett was also a noted free solo climber, and admitted to being addicted to it, saying, "I broke lots of bones while soloing, but I always went back for more. It's only since having children that I've stopped". In 1986, Fawcett free soloed over 100 extreme gritstone routes in a day (graded E1 and above, with half above E2 5c, and 4 at E5 6b) in the Peak District. His free soloing extended into highball bouldering, and in 1987, Fawcett climbed Careless Torque 8A (V11) at The Plantation in Stanage Edge, considered one of the first-ever boulders climbed at that grade in history, and which is still one of the most intimidating boulder routes in Britain.

While Fawcett had a strong determination and competitive drive to remain at the top of his emerging professional sport, he was also painfully shy, and in 2011, The Guardian said of Fawcett, "As Moffatt rose through the ranks of British climbing, the man who stood firmly at the top was Ron Fawcett – and you could never meet a man less likely to be described as an extrovert. Fawcett was almost pathologically shy. He would far rather climb alone, hundreds of feet above the ground, than have a casual conversation with a stranger".

Fawcett won the 2010 Boardman Tasker Prize for Mountain Literature with Ed Douglas, for their book Ron Fawcett, Rock Athlete.

== Notable climbs ==
- 1976: Slip 'n' Slide (E6 6a), Crookrise, North Yorkshire, the hardest gritstone route in Britain at the time. First ascent, free solo.
- 1978: Desperate Dan (E7 6b), Ilkley, West Yorkshire, since re-graded to E6 due to the use of bouldering pads, but a contender for first-ever E7 in Britain. First ascent.
- 1978: The Cad (E6 6a) Gogarth North Stack, Anglesey; controversially placed two bolts that were removed. First ascent.
- 1979: Lord of the Flies (E6 6a), Dinas Cromlech, Snowdonia. First ascent. Filmed by Sid Perou, and the famous Fawcett line, "C'mon arms, do your stuff".
- 1980: Strawberries (E6 6b), Tremadog, North Wales. First ascent. Considered one of Britain's most famous traditional routes (regraded to E7 6b, or F7C).
- 1982: The Prow F7c (5.12d), Raven's Tor, with Gill Fawcett, over 3 days. First free ascent. Sport climbing route described as a watershed route in British climbing.
- 1982: Tequila Mockingbird (E6 6c), Chee Tor, Derbyshire. Use of bolts was controversial. First ascent.
- 1983: Master's Edge (E7 6b/c), Millstone Edge, Peak District. Top roped for inspection but no practice. First ascent. Described as "Fawcett's Masterpiece" by the BMC guidebook.
- 1984: Revelations 8a+ (5.13c), Raven's Tor. Second ascent after Jerry Moffatt (FFA, 1984).
- 1986: Free soloed 100 grade E1 (and above) gritstone climbs in Derbyshire in a single day. Included four routes graded E5 6b, and over half were graded above E2 5c.
- 1987: Highball of Careless Torque 8A (V11), Stanage Edge. First ascent, and one of first at that grade in history. Still one of the most intimidating boulder routes in Britain.
- 1992: The 5,000-metre Girdle Traverse (E5 6b), Stanage Edge. Completed by Facwett in 6 hours and 10 minutes.

== Bibliography ==
- Fawcett on Rock (with John Beatty and M. John Harrison), 1987, HarperCollins. ISBN 978-0-04-440076-9.
- Ron Fawcett, Rock Athlete (with Ed Douglas), 2010, Vertebrate Graphics Ltd. ISBN 978-1-906148-17-1.
- Peak Rock – The History, The Routes, The Climbers, (Phil Kelly, Graham Hoey, Giles Barker), 2013. ISBN 978-1906148720.

== Filmography ==
- Fawcett FA of Lord of the Flies (E6 6a) at Llanberis Pass: Sid Perou (director) (1980). First Ascent (Rock Athlete, Episode 3) (Motion picture). BBC.
- Fawcett climbing at Raven Tor: Eric Harrison (director) (1982). Rock climbing (Great Escapes Series) (Motion picture). Granada Television.
- Fawcett climbing at Verdon Gorge: Sid Perou (director) (1984). The fingertip phenomenon (Motion picture). Countrywide Film Productions.
- Series on extreme sportspeople: Leo Dickinson (director) (1984). Extreme Rock with Ron Fawcett (Pushing the Limits Series) (Motion picture). Imago Films.
- Fawcett climbing in Peak District: Chris Johnston (director) (1985). Body Machine (Motion picture). RFV.

== See also ==
- History of rock climbing
- List of first ascents (sport climbing)
- Johnny Dawes, British traditional climber
- Dave MacLeod, Scottish traditional climber
- Rock climbing in the Peak District
