= John Menlove Edwards =

British rock climber

John Menlove Edwards was born at Ainsdale, near Liverpool, England, on 18 June 1910, the son of a politically radical vicar, George Zachery Edwards, and his wife Helen. His father's cousin was Hewlett Johnson, Dean of Canterbury Cathedral. John Menlove's sister Nowell Mary was known as Nowell Mary Hewlett Johnson, after becoming Hewlett Johnson's second wife.

John Menlove attended Fettes College, trained as a doctor at Liverpool University to be near his family home and assist with the care of his ailing father, and went on to qualify as a psychiatrist, afterwards setting up in private practise on Rodney Street, Liverpool. During the Second World War he was a conscientious objector, and retired to Hafod Owen in Beddgelert to focus on his writing.

Edwards was homosexual and was for many years involved in a relationship with climber Wilfrid Noyce, whom he met in 1935. Edwards saved Noyce's life after an accident on Scafell Crag in 1937. He became vulnerable to periods of mental instability in the early 1940s, and increasingly to paranoid delusions during the Second World War. He was sectioned to mental hospitals several times, and given electro-convulsive therapy and deep insulin injections at the North Wales Hospital in Denbigh. His later life is a story of decline and he committed suicide by taking cyanide on 2 February 1958 at a house belonging to his brother-in-law, Hewlett Johnson.

== Climbing ==
He learned to climb at Helsby Crag in Cheshire and at age 21 made the first free ascent of Scafell's Central Buttress. The climbs he pioneered on the cliffs of North Wales in particular created a new dimension in the repertoire of the sport, tackling steepness, looseness and difficulty that had previously been dismissed as beyond the pale. His exploits on water were similarly fearless, and included swimming down the Linn of Dee, near Braemar, when it was in spate, and rowing alone in a heavy wooden boat across the Minch in midwinter. He is regarded by many as "the finest of all writers about the sport [of climbing]", and his witty, stylish essays were acutely insightful about motivation and character. He was also an innovative writer of guidebooks to climbing venues such as Lliwedd and Tryfan.

Edwards' climbing style was described by Geoffrey Winthrop Young as "serpentine and as powerful as an anaconda coiling up loose or wet overhangs, I had the conviction that human adhesiveness in movement could go no further". He was happier climbing overhangs and loose rock than his contemporaries and predecessors, meaning he could pioneer climbs in new areas. He made more than a hundred first ascents, most of them in Snowdonia and including many of the now-classic rock routes on the crags of the Llanberis Pass in Snowdonia such as Flying Buttress, Spiral Stairs, Crackstone Rib, Nea and Brant.

As with many other British climbers of his era he was passionately against the use of pitons.
