= Dave Brailsford =

British cycling coach

Sir David Brailsford CBE
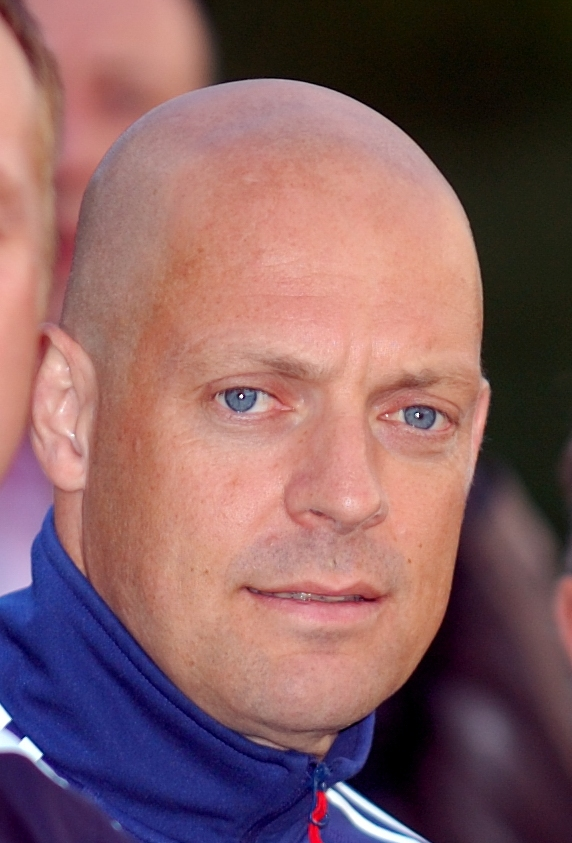
- Brailsford in 2007

Personal information
- Full name: David John Brailsford
- Born: 29 February 1964 (age 62) Shardlow, Derbyshire, England

Cycling career
- Sport: Cycling
- Current team: Netcompany–Ineos
- Disciplines: Road and track cycling
- Role: General manager

Managerial teams
- 1997–2014: British Cycling
- 2010–: Team Sky

Sir David John Brailsford CBE (born 29 February 1964) is a British sports director and former cycling coach. He is currently team principal of UCI WorldTeam Netcompany–Ineos, and was performance director of British Cycling from 1997 to 2014. He is also currently working with French football club Nice and English football club Manchester United as part of his role as Director of Sport at Ineos.

== Early life ==
Brailsford was born in Shardlow, Derbyshire, and moved as a toddler with his parents and siblings to Deiniolen, near Caernarfon in Wales:

We were one of the few English families in that area of north Wales – we'd moved there from Derby when I was two – and somehow I always felt I didn't quite fit in. So I always thought I must try harder than the others to be accepted, to be successful.

He attended Ysgol Deiniolen and Ysgol Brynrefail, and learned Welsh. In 1984 he gave up his job as an apprentice draughtsman with the local highways department to travel to France, where he raced for four years as a sponsored amateur for a team based in Saint-Étienne. He has described his years in France as a time of learning:

I'd always hated school but now I had so much time on my hands and didn't go out much in the evenings, I became an avid reader. Training manuals, books about physiology, sports psychology. I became fluent in French too.

He returned in 1988 to study for a degree in Sport and Exercise Sciences and Psychology at Chester College of Higher Education and then an MBA at Sheffield Hallam University.

== Career ==
=== Early career ===
Brailsford spent some of his early career working as an export sales manager at Planet X Bikes. He was first employed by British Cycling as a consultant in 1998, after Lottery funding began the previous year. Brailsford became programmes director before becoming performance director in 2003 following the departure of Peter Keen.

=== 'Marginal gains' philosophy ===
At British Cycling, Brailsford was noted for the concept of 'marginal gains':

The whole principle came from the idea that if you broke down everything you could think of that goes into riding a bike, and then improved it by 1%, you will get a significant increase when you put them all together.

Brailsford's approach involved the constant measuring and monitoring of key statistics such as cyclists' power output, and training interventions targeting specific weaknesses, for example the relative weakness of Bradley Wiggins in mountain racing. As well as looking at traditional components of success such as physical fitness and tactics, it also entailed a more holistic strategy, embracing technological developments, athlete psychology, and everyday life:

Do you really know how to clean your hands? Without leaving the bits between your fingers? If you do things like that properly, you will get ill a little bit less. They're tiny things but if you clump them together it makes a big difference.

Peaking in the mid-2010s at the height of Brailsford's reputation, 'marginal gains' philosophy was discussed beyond cycling in the UK mainstream media. Brailsford's '1% Factor' was also discussed in business circles in the UK and internationally. In UK education policy, the Social Mobility Commission argued in 2014 that improvements in the academic performance of disadvantaged students in British schools could be compared to "the success of [the] British cycling team: the aggregation of marginal gains". Writing on the 2016 EU referendum, the political commentator Tim Shipman cited "the philosophy of the Team Sky cycling team" in making the argument that "tiny improvements" made by the Remain campaign could have changed the referendum's result.

Tim Lewis writing in The Guardian claims the idea of marginal gains has become "tarnished" perhaps because the concept is so widely promoted, and partly because its benefits may have been overstated, while Wiggins claims the concept is a "load of rubbish".

=== Great Britain cycling team ===
At the 2004 Olympic Games Great Britain won two cycling gold medals, their best performance since 1908. Under Brailsford's leadership, the cycling team continued to improve, winning multiple world championships in road, track, BMX and mountain bike racing. Great Britain led the cycling medal table at the 2008 and 2012 Olympic Games, winning eight golds at both, while British cyclists won 59 World Championships across different disciplines from 2003 to 2013.

In reference to the success, Brailsford noted: "The whole principle came from the idea that if you broke down everything you could think of that goes into riding a bike, and then improved it by 1%, you will get a significant increase when you put them all together."

=== Team Sky/Team Ineos ===
In 2010, Brailsford also became the manager of the new British-based professional team, Team Sky. In this role he oversaw Bradley Wiggins', Chris Froome's and Geraint Thomas' victories in the 2012, 2013, 2015, 2016, 2017 and 2018 Tour de France. In April 2014, Brailsford resigned as performance director at British Cycling to concentrate on his Team Sky responsibilities.

Team Sky became Team Ineos in May 2019, due to a change of sponsor. Brailsford remained as team principal after the changeover.

In December 2021, Brailsford was appointed Director of Sport at Ineos, overseeing a growing range of teams and disciplines sponsored by the group, including French football club Nice. His role as Team Principal at INEOS Grenadiers cycling team continued unaffected.

=== Doping controversy ===
In March 2018 the Commons Digital, Culture, Media and Sport Committee published the report Combatting Doping in Sport. Chapter 2 of the report, "British Cycling and Team Sky", focused on Therapeutic Use Exemptions (TUEs) gained by both organisations for the use of drugs on the WADA Prohibited List, citing the defence used by Wiggins and Shane Sutton that TUEs were used to "find gains" and put oneself "back on a level playing field" with rivals. The report alleged in particular that the drug triamcinolone had been "used to prepare" Bradley Wiggins "and possibly other riders supporting him" for the 2012 Tour de France, "not to treat medical need, but to improve his power to weight ratio ahead of the race". It concluded that Team Sky had crossed an "ethical line" by exploiting this loophole "to enhance the performance of riders".

Following the publication of the report, Brailsford was defended by Chris Froome.

== Honours ==
- In June 2005, December 2008 and December 2012, respectively, Brailsford was appointed a Member of the Order of the British Empire (MBE), Commander of the Order of the British Empire (CBE) and a Knight Bachelor, the latter for services to cycling and the London 2012 Olympic and Paralympic Games.
- In December 2008 the 14 medals, including eight golds, achieved by British Cycling at the Olympics won him the BBC Sports Personality of the Year's Coach Award.
- In November 2008 and December 2009, respectively, he was awarded honorary doctorates by his alma maters the University of Chester and Sheffield Hallam University.
- In December 2012 he won the BBC Sports Personality of the Year Coach Award for a second time.
- As a resident of Ilkeston, he also in December 2012 received the Freedom of the Borough of Erewash, Derbyshire.
- In October 2016 he was inducted into the British Cycling Hall of Fame.
- The sports centre at Bangor University, Canolfan Brailsford, is named in his honour.
