= Llanberis railway station (London and North Western Railway) =

Former railway station in Gwynedd, Wales

Llanberis

General information
- Location: Gwynedd; Wales
- Coordinates: 53.1188°N 4.1230°W
- Grid reference: SH 580 600
- Platforms: 1

Other information
- Status: Disused

History
- Original company: Carnarvon and Llanberis Railway
- Pre-grouping: London and North Western Railway
- Post-grouping: London, Midland and Scottish Railway; British Railways

Key dates
- 1 July 1869: Opened
- 22 September 1930: Closed to regular passenger services
- 7 September 1962: Excursion traffic ceased
- 7 September 1964: Closed completely
- 1965: Track lifted
Route map
Location

Llanberis railway station was located in Llanberis, Gwynedd, Wales. It was a short walk from the Llanberis station of the Snowdon Mountain Railway. It opened 1 July 1869, and closed for regular passenger services in 1930, but it was still used by summer excursion trains until 7 September 1962 and freight services until 3 September 1964.

The last fare-paying passenger service was an enthusiasts' special on 20 October 1964.

An engine shed stood between the goods yard and the 42' turntable beyond the end of the platform. From 1948 to 1962 some excursion trains used an observation car which was turned round on the turntable so occupants always had an open view. The shed closed around 1915 and had been demolished by 1919. The goods yard was the last part of the working railway to close.

The station had a ticket platform at its northern end. A LMS caravan was sited opposite from 1934 to 1939. A camping coach was also positioned here by the London Midland Region from 1954 to 1959 (two coaches in 1954 only).

The line was lifted in 1965. The station site and most of the trackbed as far as Cwm-y-Glo are now occupied by the improved A4086, which bypasses the centre of Llanberis. In 2015 the original station building was in use as a craft shop.

Preceding station	Historical railways	Following station
Padarn Halt; Line and station closed	Carnarvonshire Railway; Llanberis Branch	Terminus
