= Nellie Evans Packard =

American singer

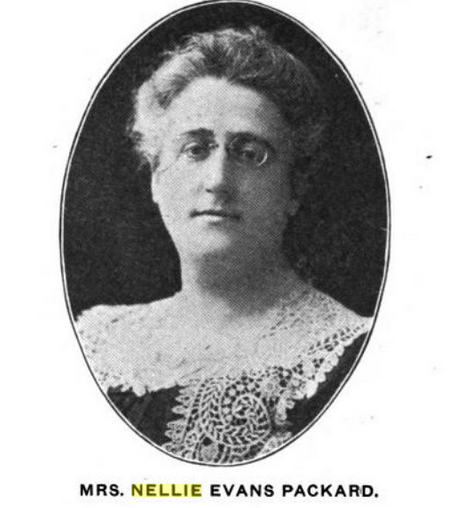
- Born: Llanrug, Wales
- Occupations: Voice teacher, arranger and choir director
- Known for: Community singing
- Spouse: Frank Edward Packard
- Father: Thomas Evans

Nellie Evans Packard was a Welsh-born American singer, voice teacher, arranger, and choir director based in Boston, Massachusetts.

== Early life ==
Nellie Evans was born at Llanrug, in northwest Wales, the daughter of Thomas Evans, who worked at the Llanberis slate quarries. She studied voice in Wales and in London.

== In Massachusetts ==
Nellie Evans moved to America in 1888 and married Frank Edward Packard, an insurance agent who was also a musician. The couple led the music program at Central Methodist Church in Brockton, Massachusetts; Nellie directed a 50-person choir, and Frank was the church's organist. She also taught voice at a studio in Boston.

In addition to presenting her students' recitals, Nellie Evans Packard was active in making community singing events popular at the First Parish Congregational Church in Brockton. She held at least six community sing-alongs, which attracted an average of more than a thousand guests each. "Mrs. Packard often conducts her largest audiences without any help except a good pianist, keeping up the interest for the hour and a half by judicious variety of program," said a reporter from Musical America in 1918.

She had "about a hundred guests" at her house for a "company sing-song" at Thanksgiving 1919.

Mrs. Packard was an arranger of church music, including a cantata titled Ruth, A Daughter of Moab, which she arranged for women's voices.
