= Ysgol Brynrefail =

Coordinates: 53.1507°N 4.1914°W

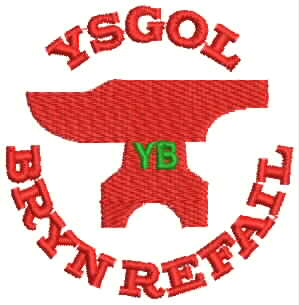
- Llanrug, Gwynedd, LL55 4AD; Wales

Information
- Type: Comprehensive
- Motto: Y Byd i'n Disgyblion a Disgyblion i'n Byd
- Established: 1900
- Local authority: Gwynedd
- Headteacher: Dylan Jones
- Gender: Mixed
- Age: 11 to 18
- Enrolment: 775 (2024)
- Language: Bilingual (Type A)
- Houses: Eilian; Elidir; Eryri; Gwyrfai
Colours
Green and White
- Website: https://www.ysgolbrynrefail.org/en/home

Ysgol Brynrefail is a bilingual comprehensive school for pupils aged 11–18. It is situated in Llanrug in Gwynedd, north Wales. Most of the school's pupils come from the villages of Llanrug, Bethel, Llanberis and the surrounding rural areas.

As of 2024, there were about 775 pupils on roll at the school. Its current headmaster is Mr Dylan Jones.

== Welsh language ==
Ysgol Brynrefail is categorised linguistically by the Welsh Government as a category 2A school, meaning that at least 80 per cent of subjects apart from English and Welsh are taught only through the medium of Welsh to all pupils. However, one or two subjects are taught to some pupils in English or in both languages.

According to the school's latest Estyn inspection report in 2020, 86% of pupils come from Welsh-speaking homes and 98% are fluent Welsh speakers.

== Notable alumni ==
- Malcolm Allen (footballer)
- David Brailsford - British Cycling Performance Director
- T. Rowland Hughes - Welsh Language Poet, Dramatist and Author
- Gwenlyn Parry - Welsh Dramatist
- T.H. Parry-Williams - Welsh Language Poet and Author
- Rhun Williams - Rugby Player
