= Bangor University Boat Club =

Welsh rowing club

- Location: Bangor, Gwynedd, Wales
- Coordinates: 53.1277881°N 4.1316285°W
- Home water: Llyn Padarn, Llanberis
- Founded: 1901
- Former names: Bangor University Rowing Club
- University: Bangor University
- Affiliations: British Rowing

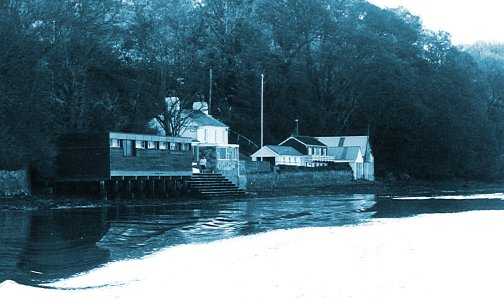
The club's old boathouse on the Menai Straits.

Bangor University Boat Club (BUBC) is the rowing club of Bangor University run for and by the university's students. The club's home water is Llyn Padarn in the nearby village of Llanberis, approximately 20 minutes outside Bangor, Gwynedd, Wales.

The club has a membership base of experienced and novice rowers. BUBC competes in BUCS events throughout the year and its members attend local head races and regattas and is affiliated to British Rowing and Welsh Rowing.

== History ==
Rowing in Bangor dates back to 1901 when the club was first started.

The club was formerly situated at a boathouse on the Menai Strait, taking advantage of a stretch of open water between the Menai Suspension Bridge and Garth Pier. Since then this location has been deemed a health and safety risk and the club was relocated to Llyn Padarn, Llanberis.

== Boat fleet ==
The club currently comprises the following boats:

- Aylings 8+
- Wintech 8+
- Wintech 4+/x
- Burgashell 1x (Paul Johnson Memorial Boat)
- Wintech 2x/-
