= Dolbadarn Castle (Turner) =

Painting by J. M. W. Turner

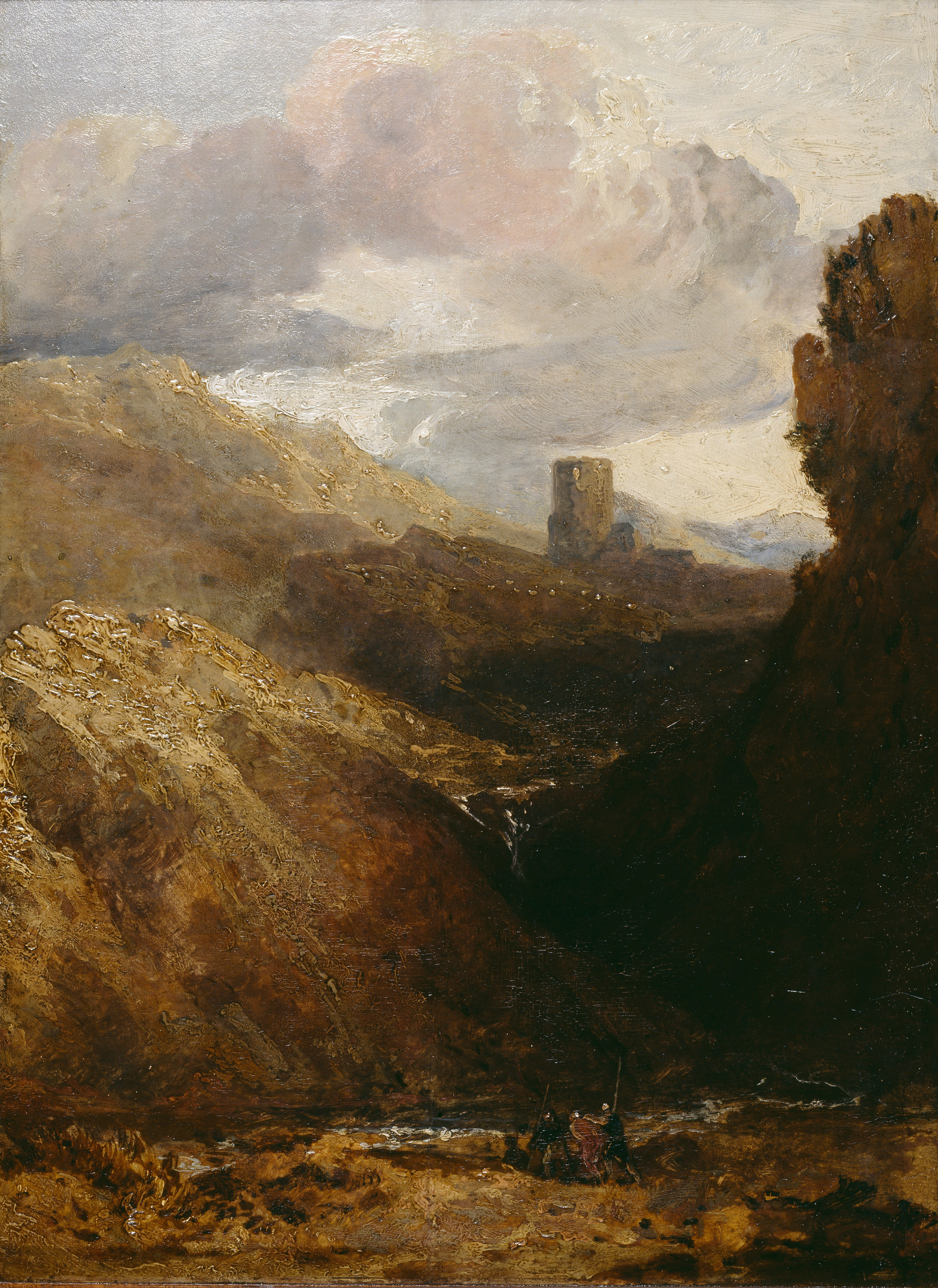
- Artist: J. M. W. Turner
- Year: 1798
- Medium: oil on wood
- Subject: Dolbadarn Castle
- Dimensions: 45.5 cm × 30 cm (17.9 in × 12 in)
- Website: hdl.handle.net/...4655776

Dolbadarn Castle is an oil painting by J. M. W. Turner (1775–1851) depicting Dolbadarn Castle, created in 1798–1799. It is part of a body of work completed by Turner during a tour of the region, which included Dolbadarn, Llanberis and other parts of Snowdonia. Many supporting studies can be found in a sketch book now held by Tate Britain (Record: TB XLVI). When Turner returned to his London studio he developed these sketches into a number of more accomplished paintings of North Wales, including this one, which is now kept at the National Library of Wales.

This painting is particularly notable as it is one of two that Turner submitted as Diploma works to the Royal Academy in 1800.

== Historical event ==
The painting is an artist's impression of a 13th-century event of some importance in Welsh history. It depicts Owain Goch, the brother of Prince Llywelyn ap Gruffudd (LLywelyn the Second), being taken by soldiers to prison at Dolbadarn Castle. Owain was imprisoned at the Castle between 1255 and 1277, when he was released. The imprisonment of Owain, dressed in red in the painting, left his brother Llywelyn free to concentrate on uniting Wales against the English.

== Travel through Wales ==
Turner first visited Wales in 1792, when he traveled through the south of the country. On his second visit in 1794, he visited Flintshire and Denbighshire. In 1798 he paid a much longer visit to Wales, travelling through Dyffryn Wysg, Ceredigion, Aberystwyth, Gwynedd and Llangollen.

== Details of the picture ==
The frame was especially commissioned for the painting from John Jones of London, in the 1940s. The picture was purchased by the Library with the help of the National Art Collection Fund and the National Lottery. The medium is oil on a wood panel and the visible area measures 45.5 x 30 cm., and the frame 62 x 50 cm. Turner also submitted this work with some lines of verse related to the painting's themes, a relatively common practice of his. The verse reads, "How awful is the silence of the waste,/ Where nature lifts her mountains to the sky,/ Majestic solitude, behold the tower/ Where hopeless OWEN, long imprison'd, pined/ And wrung his hands for liberty in vain."

Turner's use of contrast between light and dark creates a sense of peril and categorizes the painting as an example of the Sublime.

== See also ==
- List of paintings by J. M. W. Turner
