= Brynrefail, Gwynedd =

Coordinates: 53.141°N 4.155°W

Brynrefail
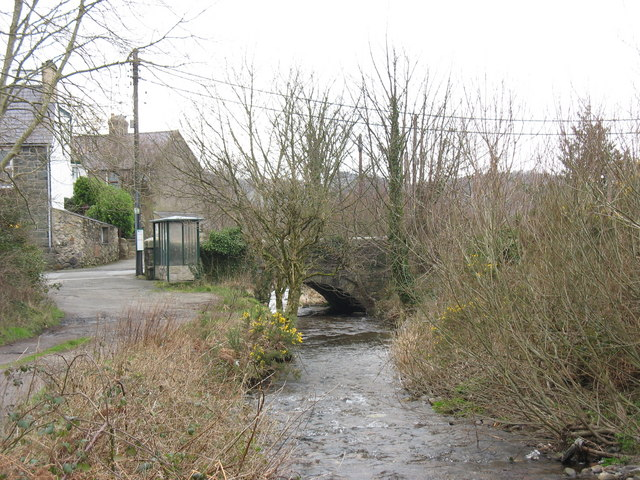
- Afon Caledffrwd at Pont Brynrefail

- Location within Gwynedd
- OS grid reference: SH558626
- Community: Llanddeiniolen
- Principal area: Gwynedd
- Country: Wales
- Sovereign state: United Kingdom
- Post town: CAERNARFON
- Postcode district: LL55
- Dialling code: 01286
- Police: North Wales
- Fire: North Wales
- Ambulance: Welsh
- UK Parliament: Dwyfor Meirionnydd
- Senedd Cymru – Welsh Parliament: Gwynedd Maldwyn

Brynrefail (also Bryn-yr-Efail) is a small village in Gwynedd, Wales. The village is in the Dwyfor Meirionnydd UK constituency and the Gwynedd Council Ward of Penisa'r Waun. It is close to the northern shore of Llyn Padarn lake. Along the main street there are mainly traditional terraced houses. Notable buildings include the village's post office and the village's sole chapel, which is still in use. The village is protected from Llanberis and has a dedicated community beat manager.

== History ==
In the 19th century, the village was built to house workers for the nearby Dinorwic slate quarry. It developed around the village's forge; the building that housed the forge, built in 1776, still exists and has been converted into a cottage called "The Nook". Brynrefail's development may have also been influenced by the quarry railway between Dinorwic Quarry and Y Felinheli, which skirted around the village.

The village was home to the Ysgol Brynrefail before the campus was moved to the nearby town of Llanrug in the 1960s. The school's site was cleared in the 1990s. In 2002, work began on a multi-use centre called "Caban." Opened in 2004, Caban is home to a café, a meeting room, which doubles as the village's chapel, and 13 business units. The café was mentioned in the Which? 2008 Good Food Guide.
