= Afon Rhythallt =

River in Gwynedd, Wales

Coordinates: 53.14883°N 4.17034°W

The River Rhythallt (Welsh: Afon Rhythallt) is a river in Gwynedd, North Wales whose source is Llyn Padarn. It flows in a northwesterly direction past the village of Brynrefail, Gwynedd and changes its name to Afon Seiont downstream of Pont Rhythallt in Llanrug. The Afon Seiont eventually reaches the sea at Caernarfon. The river has a broad flood plain which occasionally threatens homes in the village of Cwm-y-glo.
