= Pete Livesey =

English rock climber

Personal information
- Nationality: English
- Born: 12 December 1943 Huddersfield, England
- Died: 26 February 1998 (aged 54) Malham, North Yorkshire, England

Climbing career
- Type of climber: Traditional climbing, Free soloing
- First ascents: Footless Crow E5 6b (1974); Right Wall E5 6a (1974)
- Known for: Leading British rock climber of the mid-1970s

Pete Livesey (12 December 1943 to 26 February 1998), was an English rock climber who raised the standard of technical difficulty in traditional climbing in Britain during the early to mid-1970s. Livesey was renowned for the intensity and competitiveness he brought to the development of his sport as well as a mischievous sense of humour, and during the mid-1970s, Livesey was regarded as Britain's leading rock climber.

== Climbing career ==
Livesey was known for his natural strength and stamina and was one of the first British rock climbers to develop climbing-specific training programs and the use of new indoor climbing walls. Livesey came to national prominence with his 1974 ascent of Footless Crow (E5 6b) at Goat Crag in the Lake District, and later that year freed the bold line of Right Wall (E5 6a) at Dinas Cromlech, the site of Joe Brown's 1952 classic climb, Cenotaph Corner. Both of these routes were arguably the hardest traditional British climbing routes at the time and earned Livesey the title of Britain's best climber.

Outside of Britain, Livesey made the second ascent of the Troll Wall in Norway, Europe's largest rock-face. He free climbed several aid climbing routes in the Italian Dolomites. Livesey impressed local climbers on rock routes in Austria's Kaiser Mountains. In France, he showed locals how they could free up aid climbing routes and free climb on the long limestone walls of the Gorge du Verdon; his most notable new route being Piche Nibou.

Livesey visited the Yosemite Valley with his protege, Ron Fawcett, where on the first ascent of Carbon Wall a climbing partner noted that unknown to the rest of the team, Livesey made a reconnaissance the day before the climb, abseiling down the 500-feet of the route to inspect the difficulties: "It was typical of Livesey: he was always one step ahead of everyone else, particularly Ron Fawcett - he had to find ways to outwit Ron because Ron really was the best climber in the world". Fawcett would take on the mantle of Britain's leading climber from Livesey, from the late-1970s to the mid-1980s.

After climbing Golden Mile in 1981, Livesey more or less quit rock climbing, turning to orienteering, and excelled at it by topping the M45 rankings; much as he had done in other sports he took part in. He also had a remarkable record as a fell runner, including four consecutive top ten placings in the Karrimor International Mountain Marathon. Livesey directed the respected outdoor pursuits course at Ilkley and Bradford Community College and served on committees of the British Mountaineering Council. Livesey died on 26 February 1998 from cancer, aged 54.

== Selected routes ==
Yorkshire

- Crossbones, Malham – E2 5c (First free ascent – 1967)
- Doubting Thomas, Malham – E5 6b (First ascent – 1971)
- Face Route, Gordale – E3 6a (First ascent – 1971)
- Jenny Wren, Gordale – E5 6a (First ascent – 1971)
- Central Wall, Kilnsey – E4 6a (First free ascent – 1972)
- The Diedre, Kilnsey – E2 5b (First free ascent – 1972)
- Deliverance, Gordale – E5 6b (First ascent – 1973)
- Mossdale Trip, Gordale – E6 6a (First ascent – 1977)
- Clink, Trow Gill – Now 7a (First Free ascent - 1972)

Lake District

- Lunatic, Chapel Head Scar – E3 5c (First ascent – 1974)
- Footless Crow, Goat Crag – E5 6b (First ascent – 1974); one of the hardest routes in Britain at the time.
- Javelin, Trowbarrow Quarry – E1 5b (First ascent – 1976)

Peak District

- Debauchery, High Tor – E1 5b (First free ascent – 1967)
- Darius, High Tor – E2 5c (First free ascent – 1974)
- Nightmare of Brown Donkeys, High Tor – E3 6a (First free ascent – 1975)
- Behemoth, Water-cum-Jolly – E5 6b (First free ascent – 1976)
- China Spring, High Tor – E5 6a (First ascent – 1976)
- The Girdle Traverse, High Tor – E5 6b (First free ascent – 1976)
- Downhill Racer, Froggatt Edge– E4 6a (First ascent – 1977)

Wales

- Right Wall, Dinas Cromlech – E5 6a (First ascent – 1974); one of the hardest routes in Britain at the time.

== Filmography ==
- Livesey on Face Route, Wellington Crack, Downhill Racer, and Liberator: Sid Perou (director) (1980). New Extremes (Rock Athlete, Episode 2) (Motion picture). BBC.

== Bibliography ==
- Sheard, John; Radtke, Mark (March 2014). Pete Livesey - Fast and Free: Stories of a Rock-Climbing Legend. 2QT. ISBN 978-1910077016.

== See also ==
- Johnny Dawes, British traditional climber
- Dave MacLeod, Scottish traditional climber
- Rock climbing in the Peak District
