= 1993 Llyn Padarn helicopter crash =

Helicopter crash in Wales

Coordinates: 53°07′31″N 4°07′46″W

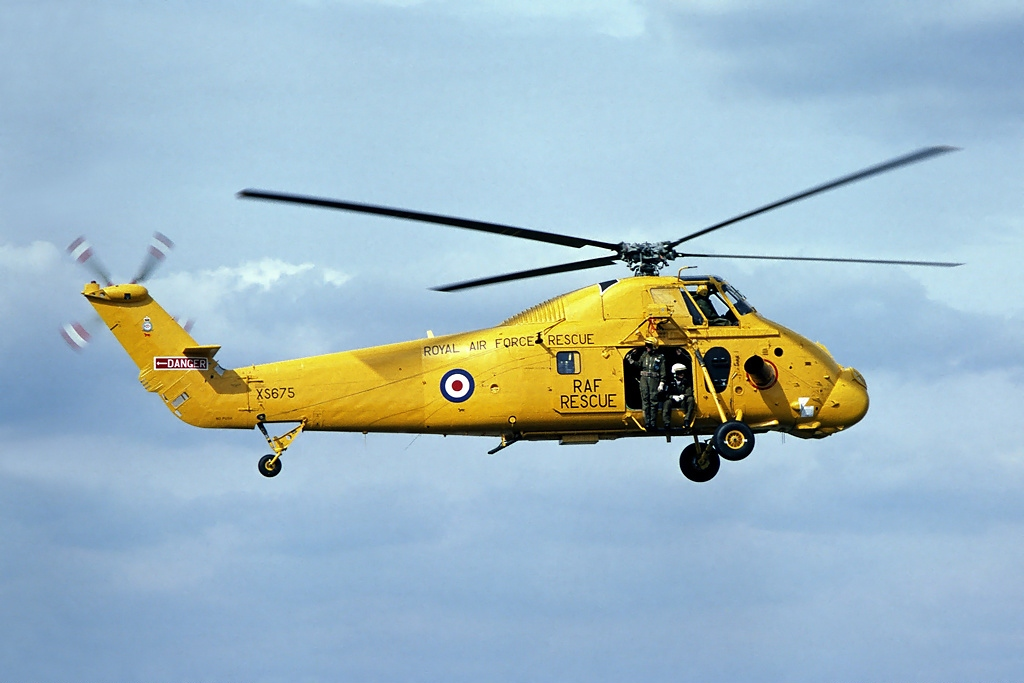
- A RAF Westland Wessex similar to the one involved.

Accident
- Date: 12 August 1993
- Summary: Tail rotor failure
- Site: Llyn Padarn

Aircraft
- Aircraft type: Westland Wessex
- Operator: RAF
- Registration: XR524
- Passengers: 4
- Crew: 3
- Fatalities: 3
- Survivors: 4

The 1993 Llyn Padarn helicopter crash occurred on 12 August 1993, when an RAF Westland Wessex helicopter, serial number XR524, with 3 aircrew and 4 Air Training Corps cadet passengers on board suffered a catastrophic tail rotor failure and plunged into Llyn Padarn, a lake in North Wales. Three passengers were killed.

== Accident ==
The aircraft departed RAF Valley on 12 August 1993, for a routine search and rescue training mission over North Wales. Aboard were three crewmembers and four Air Training Corps Cadets from Northern England. As they were flying over the lake, the pilot performed a planned autopilot failure simulation. However, the aircraft encountered a genuine emergency when it lost the drive to its tail rotor. (Note: On helicopters, the tail rotor is powered by the main engine through a shaft that goes the length of the tail boom.) Without it to counteract the torque produced by the main rotor, the helicopter became uncontrollable and started spinning before impacting the water. The crash was caught on amateur video.

The three crew and one cadet were able to escape the wreckage. She recounted:

...there was all this icy black water gushing in through the door. I didn't even have time to take a breath of air. I couldn't see anything and couldn't breathe. I remember feeling around for the door and not being able to find it. But somehow I got out and inflated my lifejacket. There was no chance to see what happened to any of the others.

Several persons, including a canoeing monitor rushed to the crash site and rescued the survivors. The three remaining occupants of the helicopter were presumably trapped in the wreckage and drowned.

== Investigation ==
As the accident aircraft belonged to the RAF, the responsibility for investigating the crash lay not with the Air Accidents Investigation Branch but with the military. The Ministry of Defence released a report in November 1995. The RAF investigators determined the loss of power on the tail rotor to have been caused by two toothed flanges in the tail boom failing to engage properly. The tail of the Westland Wessex can be folded for storage and transport. The shaft that drives the tail rotor is broken and then remade by means of a disconnect coupling using two flanges. When the tail was last unfolded, the two flanges failed to mesh completely. It is hypothesized that the disconnection of the autopilot just prior the accident increased the stress on the tail section, triggering the failure. After the two halves of the transmission train became decoupled, the tail rotor was not powered and ceased functioning. The crew then had no means to control the aircraft.

Beginning January 1996, a civilian inquest was also held in Llandudno.

== Aftermath ==
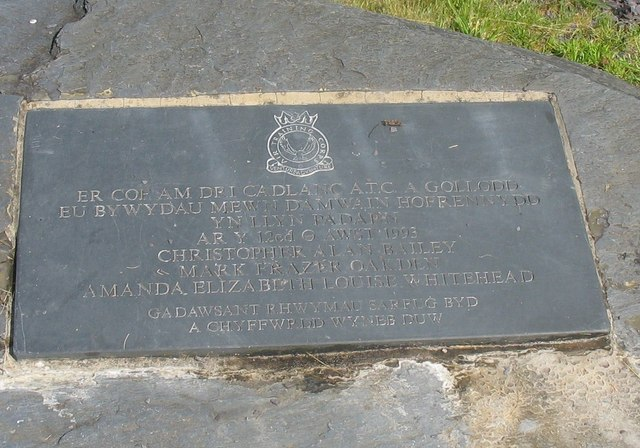
The plaque

For some time after the accident, all Westland Wessex in the United Kingdom were grounded for all but emergency use. The grounding was eventually lifted and Westland Wessex re-entered service. As of 2000, at least one of the four recommendations made by the military board of inquiry as a result of the crash (simulator training for a tail rotor failure) had been implemented.
A plaque has been placed near the crash site. A memorial service was held there in 2003, for the tenth anniversary of the tragedy.
