= Rhun Williams =

Welsh rugby union footballer

- Born: Rhun Williams; 5 June 1997 (age 29) Bangor, Gwynedd, Wales
- Height: 185 cm (6 ft 1 in)
- Weight: 87 kg (13 st 10 lb)
- University: Llysfasi, Coleg Cambria

Rugby union career
- Position(s): Fullback, Wing
Youth career
- Caernarfon RFC
Senior career
| Years | Team | Apps | (Points) |
| 2016–2020 | Cardiff Blues | 30 | (20) |
- Correct as of 7 November 2022
International career
| Years | Team | Apps | (Points) |
| 2016–2017 | Wales U20 | 12 | (5) |
- Correct as of 7 November 2022

Rhun Williams (born 5 June 1997) is a retired Welsh rugby union player. He grew up in Llanrug. Rhun played primarily as a fullback for Cardiff Blues, but also could play wing. He was a Wales U20 international.

Williams made his debut for the Cardiff Blues in 2016 having previously played for their academy, Cardiff RFC, Caernarfon RFC and RGC 1404.

In May 2017 Williams was selected for the Wales national team summer 2017 tour of Samoa and Tonga. On 23 May 2017 he withdrew from the squad due to injury and was replaced by Phil Dollman.

Williams announced his retirement in March 2020, after failing to overcome a neck injury sustained two years prior.
