= List of Ramsar sites in Wales =

This list of Ramsar sites in Wales includes wetlands that are considered to be of international importance under the Ramsar Convention. Wales currently has 10 sites designated as "Wetlands of International Importance" with a surface area of 52,036 hectares (520.36 km^{2}). For a full list of all Ramsar sites worldwide, see List of Ramsar wetlands of international importance.

== List of Ramsar Sites ==
Name	Location	Area (km^{2})	Designated	Description	Image
Burry Inlet	Carmarthenshire; 51°39′N 4°11′W	66.72	14 July 1992	Largest continuous area of saltmarsh in Wales.	
Cors Caron	Ceredigion; 52°16′N 3°55′W	8.74	28 September 1992	A raised bog, the Cors Caron provides habitat for the European otter as well as a variety of wild fowl and the endangered red kite.	
Cors Fochno and Dyfi	Ceredigion; 52°32′N 4°0′W	25.08	5 January 1976	The Cors Fochno is a raised peat bog. Dyfi is an estuary and salt marsh which includes sandbanks, mudflats and a large sand dune complex.	
Corsydd Môn a Llŷn (Anglesey & Llŷn Fens)	53°19′N 4°18′W	6.26	2 February 1998		
Crymlyn Bog	Swansea; 51°38′N 3°53′W	2.68	8 June 1993	Important refuge for the bittern, water rail, sedge and reed warblers, bearded tit and grey heron.	
The Dee Estuary	Flintshire and the Wirral Peninsula; 53°18′8″N 3°12′56″W	143.02	17 July 1985	Includes natural fisheries of salmon and trout as well as other sea-fisheries and shell-fisheries.	
Llyn Idwal	Gwynedd; 53°7′N 4°1′W	0.14	7 November 1991	A small lake that lies within Cwm Idwal in the Glyderau mountains of Snowdonia.	
Llyn Tegid	Gwynedd; 52°53′N 3°37′W	4.82	7 November 1991	Largest natural body of water in Wales, the lake contains the endemic gwyniad, now listed as critically endangered as well as the very rare mollusc Myxas glutinosa.	
Midland Meres and Mosses (Phase 2)	52°55′N 2°46′W	15.88	2 February 1997		
Severn Estuary	Gloucestershire; 51°36′N 2°40′W	247.01	5 January 1976	An estuary with important intertidal wildlife habitats including mudflats, sandflats, rocky platforms and islands.	

== See also ==
- Ramsar Convention
- List of Ramsar sites worldwide
