= Working timetable =

Schedule in transportation

A working timetable (WTT) - (Fr. horaire de service (HDS) or service annuel (SA); N. America Employee timetable) is the data defining all planned train and rolling-stock movements which will take place on the relevant infrastructure during the period for which it is in force; within the EU, it is established once per calendar year. The trains included may be passenger trains, freight trains, empty stock movements, or even bus and/or ship connections or replacements.

== Contents ==
The detail found in Working Timetables includes the timings at every major station, junction, or other significant location along the train's journey (including additional minutes inserted to allow for such factors as engineering work or particular train performance characteristics), which platforms are used at certain stations, and line codes where there is a choice of running line.

Further information may include the train's identification (or "reporting") number which, in Network Rail practice, consists of a four digit alpha-numeric code where the first number indicates the type of train (fast, stopping, Freightliner and so on), followed by a letter indicating the area of operation or destination and then two figures denoting the individual service; what service the train next forms; what formation ("consist") the train has, its maximum speed, and any other information relevant to the operation of the train. A WTT for the Parisian Petite Ceinture belt railway gives a gradient profile and track diagram for the entire railway.

In the USA, the New Haven Railroad Employee Timetable contained such information as: the maximum allowable speeds for different types of locomotives; electrical operating instructions concerning the operation of the AC catenary system and pantographs; designation of on which lines the different types of signalling were operational, e.g. manual block, automatic block and centralized traffic control.

Railway companies incorporate their philosophy of service provision into their timetable in numerical, chronological form. In the beginning of commercial railways, the timetable was the authority for a train to be at a particular location at a specified time, subject to any restrictions imposed by the rules, regulations and engineered safety controls (which were originally minimal). As such, instructional publications were often referred to as 'appendices' to the working timetable. As the rules and regulations gradually expanded following accidents, the working timetable became more of a guide than an absolute authority.

== Safe working ==
The working timetable is effectively the foundation of railway safe operations and one of six main instructional publications which employees of Traffic departments in British style railways traditionally had at their disposal. The other publications were the Rule Book, General Appendix to the Working Timetable, Sectional or Local Appendix to the Working Timetable, Regulations for Train Signalling, circulars and weekly notices (names varied between companies).

Unscheduled or 'special' train movements are worked as margins in the timetable permit. Such movements are authorized and regulated by staff such as signalmen, station masters and train controllers.

== Updating ==
Most railway companies revise their standard working timetable (SWTT) every few years, or as changes in their network require.

The daily working timetable (DWTT) consists of the standard working timetable (SWTT) as amended by publications such as Special Train Notices or telegrams. Special train notices are temporary amendments to the SWTT, issued as required for additional ('special') trains or alterations to the working of trains already in the SWTT.

=== Australia ===
Sydney Trains

The SWTT is updated every 2 to 3 years for the 7 day period covering 6400 passenger trains and 1000 freight trains. The DWTT is constantly updated to include special events such as sport events, concerts (500+ requests); special trains i.e. train testing, school charters, crew training and heritage trains (700+ requests); and work trains i.e. inspections and maintenance (500+ requests). The approval time for the 1700+ requests a year ranges from 4 weeks to 26 weeks depending on the impact on customers.

=== Germany ===
Most German motive power is now equipped with an electronic WTT, known as the EBuLa or "Elektronischer Buchfahrplan" which is kept constantly updated by GPS and is displayed on a screen in the driver's cab. This also incorporates speed restriction and non-standard signal stopping distance data from the "Langsamfahrstrecken" document, the near-equivalent of which in British terminology would be the Sectional Appendix.

== Use of WTTs as historical documents ==
The railway historian Jack Simmons suggests that the WTTs are only a set of instructions issued to staff and indicate intended, not actual, train operations, and that this should be borne in mind when using them for historical research. However, Simmons also notes that, read with care, "they show us how railways were made to work, in normal service, as no other documents can."

== Availability ==
Current British railway WTTs, compiled by Network Rail, are available online. The versions published by the various pre-grouping railways, the "Big Four (British railway companies)", British Rail(ways), Railtrack and Network Rail in book form and branded "Not for publication" can frequently be found at rail exhibitions, second hand book shops, and auction websites. Some WTTs have been reprinted as commercial publications.

Britain's National Archives and National Railway Museum hold copies of many printed WTTs issued by the railways of Great Britain and Ireland and these are available for consultation by the public.

Transport for London has made available up-to-date working timetables for the London Underground, as well as every London bus route, on their website.
