= Llyn Padarn =

Lake in Gwynedd, North Wales

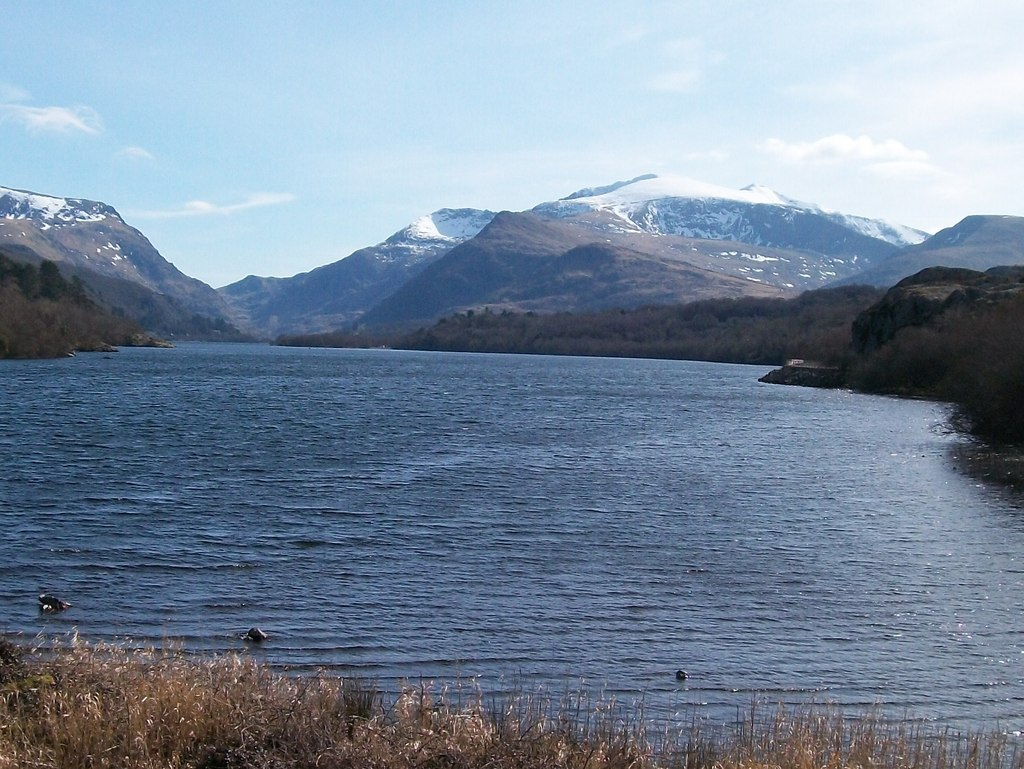
- Llyn Padarn

- Location within Wales
- Location: Snowdonia, Gwynedd, Wales
- Coordinates: 53°07′31″N 4°07′46″W
- Type: moraine dammed lake
- Max. length: 2 miles (3.2 km)

Arctic Charr conservation at Llyn Padarn

Llyn Padarn is a glacially formed lake in Snowdonia, Gwynedd, North Wales, and is an example of a moraine dammed lake. The lake is approximately 2 miles (3.2 km) long (about 240 acres (97 ha)) and at its deepest point is 94 feet (29 m) deep, and is one of the largest natural lakes in Wales. At its south-eastern end it is linked to the neighbouring Llyn Peris (which forms the lower reservoir of the Dinorwig power station). The busy village of Llanberis lies on the southern banks of the lake.

Most of Llyn Padarn is owned by Gwynedd Council and is part of Padarn Country Park. Whilst kayaking, rowing and sailing are permitted on the lake, powered craft require permission to use it. Bangor University Rowing Club row at Llyn Padarn.

In April 2014 Llyn Padarn was designated as Bathing Water under the Bathing Waters Directive 2006 (2006/7/EC).

The outflow of Llyn Padarn is on the northern shore and is called Afon Rhythallt, which passes by the village of Brynrefail, and becomes Afon Seiont below Pont Rhythallt, near Llanrug. It reaches the sea at Caernarfon.

Padarn Country Park is located on the northern flank of the lake, including Coed Allt Wen, a rare and ancient sessile oak woodland. Both the woodland and Llyn Padarn are designated as Sites of Special Scientific Interest.

The Llanberis Lake Railway also runs along its northeastern bank and various recreational activities take place on the lake, especially during the summer. These include canoeing, boating and fishing. The lake was the venue for the rowing events of the 1958 British Empire and Commonwealth Games. In October 2024, a sauna opened on the lake.

A lone birch tree grows just off the south western shore, a short walk from the Llanberis Water Sports Centre carpark. The tree, about 18' high in 2020, has become a celebrity and well-known to walkers and photographers under the name "The Lonely Tree" (or sometimes just "The Lone Tree").

Former local bus company Padarn Bus, which operated between 1979 and 2014 from a base at nearby Llanberis, was named after the lake.

Llyn Padarn is named after Padarn, an early 6th century saint, who has a church dedicated to him in Llanberis.

== 1993 RAF Helicopter Crash ==
In 1993, an RAF Westland Wessex helicopter suffered a rotor failure, and crashed into the lake, killing three Air Training Corps Cadets, Christopher Bailey (15) from Horwich, Mark Oakden (16) and Amanda Whitehead (17) from Bury, and injuring one.
