= Llanrug =

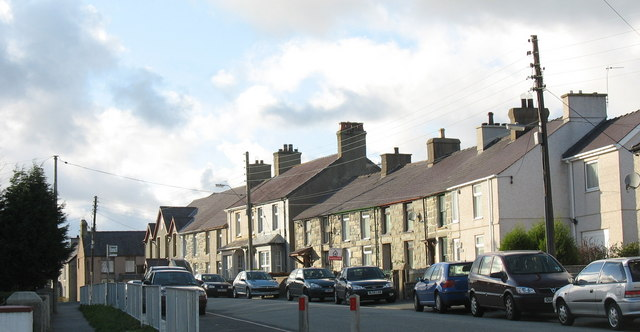
- Station Road, Llanrug

- Location within Gwynedd
- Population: 2,911 (2020)
- OS grid reference: SH534634
- Community: Llanrug
- Principal area: Gwynedd
- Country: Wales
- Sovereign state: United Kingdom
- Post town: Caernarfon
- Postcode district: LL55
- Dialling code: 01286
- Police: North Wales
- Fire: North Wales
- Ambulance: Welsh
- UK Parliament: Dwyfor Meirionnydd
- Senedd Cymru – Welsh Parliament: Arfon
- List of places UK Wales Gwynedd 53.147°N 4.193°W Map of the community

Llanrug (or Llanfihangel-yn-y-grug) is a medium-sized village and community in Gwynedd, north-west Wales. It lies about 4 miles (6.4 km) to the east of Caernarfon, 7 miles (11 km) south of Bangor and 3 miles (4.8 km) northwest of Llanberis. It is the largest populated village in the Arfon area of Gwynedd, Wales. The old name of the village was Llanfihangel-yn-y-grug, derived from Eglwys Sant Mihangel, which is situated about half a mile west of the village.

== Geography ==
The village has many public footpaths, all of which have views of Snowdonia, including the Carneddau, Glyderau and the north-western flank of the Snowdon Massif.

The River Seiont, which rises near Llanberis, flows westwards to the north of the village before flowing out to Caernarfon Bay and is a popular angling river. The river includes a fish hatchery just outside the village run by the local Seiont, Gwyrfai and Llyfni fishing associations.

The busy A4086 road from Llanberis Pass to Caernarfon runs through the village. It was reported in 2024 that the average speed on 20mph limit roads was 26.6mph. The community includes the villages of Cwm-y-glo, Ceunant, and Pont-rug. The Pontrhythallt area of Llanrug was the site of the former Pontrhythallt railway station; the rails were lifted in 1965.

The Penbont Inn public house, situated at the stone road bridge that crosses the Afon Rhythallt River, was named the Railway Inn until the railway was closed in the 1960s.

=== Climate ===
Along with the surrounding area of Snowdonia, the village has wetter and slightly cooler weather than lower areas of North-west Wales; this includes nearby areas such as Caernarfon and Anglesey. The annual mean temperature of Llanrug is 11 °C (52 °F)..

The village's snowiest and coldest month of the year is January, with the mean temperature between 1 °C (34 °F) and 5 °C (41 °F). Ground frost can occur from late November into early April. Snow falls from early December into early April. Due to an altitude of 120 metres and close proximity to mountains of Snowdonia, the village normally expects snow to fall on an average of up to 10 days every winter season. During the summer, June and July are typically the warmest months with average temperatures ranging from 16 °C (68 °F) to 21 °C (72 °F).

== Education ==
There is a primary school for pupils aged between 4 and 11 situated in the village called Ysgol Gynradd Llanrug. 253 pupils were enrolled at the school in 2023. There is also a secondary school for pupils aged between 11 and 18 called Ysgol Brynrefail. There were 805 pupils enrolled at the school in 2023. The school serves Llanrug and other surrounding villages including Llanberis, Penisarwaun, Waunfawr, Deiniolen and Bethel.

== Welsh language ==
According to the United Kingdom Census 2021, 86.0 per cent of all usual residents aged 3+ in Llanrug can speak Welsh, making it the area that had the second highest percentage of Welsh speakers in Wales. The Census also noted that 93.6 per cent of the population could speak, read, write or understand Welsh.

According to the latest Estyn report in 2023, 86.8 per cent of pupils in the village primary school were from Welsh-speaking homes. In 2020, 86 per cent of pupils in Llanrug's secondary school came from Welsh-speaking homes.

== Governance ==
An electoral ward in the same name exists. This does not cover all the area of the community and the resultant population taken at the 2011 census was 1,916 only.

== Facilities ==
The village has two pubs and a hotel, located to the west, called Seiont Manor. A holiday park is to the south of the village, Brynteg Holiday Park, owned by Park Leisure Group.

Bus services to Llanrug are provided by S1 and S3 Gwynfor Coaches service routes. The Company depot is situated in the town of Llangefni, Anglesey.

The church of St Michael is a Grade II* listed building. Bryn Bras Castle is a Grade II* listed country house located on the old road between Llanrug and Llanberis.

The local Brass Band is the oldest in Wales and one of the oldest in the world. Commonly knows as ‘Seindorf Arian Llanrug’ or ‘Llanrug Siver Band’ in English.

== Sport ==
The village includes a football club, Llanrug United F.C., established in 1922. Since the late 1960s the club have hosted their home games in Cae Eithin Duon, situated to the east of the village. It was in Llanrug that many scenes of the popular Welsh comedy programme C'mon Midffild were filmed during the 1980s and 1990s.

== Notable residents ==
Rhun Williams – Rugby Player, raised in Llanrug, currently playing as a full back for the Cardiff Blues Region in the Guinness Pro14.

Hugh Rowlands – General Sir Hugh Rowlands VC KCB DL (6 May 1828 – 1 August 1909) was the first Welsh recipient of the Victoria Cross.

Kieffer Moore - Football player for the Welsh national side with a grandfather from Llanrug, making him eligible to play for the team.

Nellie Evans Packard – Llanrug-born American singer, the daughter of Thomas Evans.
