= Sid Perou =

British cinematographer and film director

- Born: Sidney Allen Bruce Perou; 19 April 1937
- Died: 14 July 2024 (aged 87); Chiang Mai, Thailand
- Occupations: Cinematographer, Film director
- Known for: Cave documentaries
- Notable work: Sunday at Sunset Pot, The Lost River of Gaping Gill, Mysteries Underground
- Spouse: Alison Wellock (m. 1971; died 1996)
- Children: 2
- Awards: Emmy Award for Outstanding Individual Achievement in Informational Programming (1993)

Sidney Allen Bruce Perou (19 April 1937 – 14 July 2024) was a British cinematographer and film director, notable for his work filming cave exploration. It has been said that he was "renowned throughout the caving and broadcasting world", "possibly the greatest cave film maker of all time", and "the man who brought caving to the masses". His work has received international acclaim.

== Early life ==
Perou was born as Sidney Allen Bruce Perou in April 1937 to father Sid and mother Harriet (who went by the name of "Kit"). Sid was a serviceman in the Royal Air Force.

== Career ==
In the mid 1960s Perou worked for the BBC as a sound recordist, based at Ealing Studios. In 1967, because of his recreational caving experience, he was assigned to work on the documentary Sunday at Sunset Pot. This documentary detailed the attempted rescue of caver Eric Luckhurst from Sunset Hole. Perou was initially working on the documentary as sound recordist. However, due to the original cameraman being unfamiliar with working in the cave environment, Perou was asked to take over on camera. This was his first experience filming underground. After Sunday at Sunset Pot, he left his job at the BBC to move to Yorkshire, as he had decided that he wanted to be a filmmaker. In Yorkshire, his first commission was for The World About Us to film The Lost River of Gaping Gill in 1970.

As a cinematographer and director, Perou was involved in the creation of over a dozen caving documentaries, and over 50 films in total. He was considered especially talented at lighting caves so that it appeared as though the only sources of illumination were the cavers' headlamps.

== Later life ==
In 2010 Perou retired from filmmaking and emigrated from the United Kingdom to Thailand.

Perou died on 14 July 2024, in Chiang Mai, Thailand.

== Awards and honors ==
Together with Lionel Friedberg, Perou won an Emmy in 1993 for Outstanding Individual Achievement in Informational Programming for his work in Lechuguilla Cave which appeared as part of a 1992 National Geographic special, Mysteries Underground. While Mysteries Underground won the most prestigious award of any of Perou's projects, several other documentaries won regional awards or prizes at cave-related film festivals. The documentary The Lost River of Gaping Gill won Best TV Reportage prize at the 7th Festival International du Film de Spéléologie in 1984, Silver Gentian Prize at the 1985 International Film Festival in Trento, the Pye Colour Television Award for Best Regional Production in 1985, and shared "best story or adventure film" with Hollow Mountains of Mulu at the International Festival Internacional de Cinema Espeleològic in 1984. The series Beneath the Pennines won the Grand Prix at the International Caving Film Festival in 1978, as well as the Royal Television Society's Regional Programme of the Year Award.

In 1999, Perou won the Giles Barker award. The award was refurbished on an episode of The Repair Shop after it became damaged returning the award back to the uk. Broadcast on BBC 2 on 15th July 2026

== Life in media ==
Perou authored a book on his experiences titled 30 Years as an Adventure Cameraman. In 2010, Martin (Basher) Baines released a documentary on Perou's life titled The Sid Perou Story.

== Personal life ==
Perou's first marriage was to Alison Wellock, a woman whom he met during the planning of the filming of The Lost River of Gaping Gill. They married on 27 March 1971 and had two children: Martin and Tom. Alison died in 1996 at age 47 after an illness.

== Filmography ==
Perou worked on many films related to outdoor activities such as caving, rock climbing, hot air ballooning, and hang gliding.

- Sunday at Sunset Pot (1967)
- The Lost River of Gaping Gill (1970)
- What a Way to Spend a Sunday (1972)
- The Deepest Hole in the World (1973)
- Castleguard - Challenge Under the Glacier (1974)
- Beneath the Pennines—series (1977)
  - Beneath the Pennines - Alum Pot
  - Beneath the Pennines - Dow Cave
  - Beneath the Pennines - White Scar Cave
  - Beneath the Pennines - Lancaster Hole
  - Beneath the Pennines - Pippikin Pot
- Speleogenesis (1978)
- Rock Athlete—series (1980)
  - Rock Athlete - In Search of New Summits
  - Rock Athlete - New Extremes
  - Rock Athlete - First Ascent
- Troll Wall (1981)
- Man Bilong Hole Bilong Stone (1981)
- Raging River of Annapurna (1981)
- Pennine Challenge—series (1984)
  - Pennine Challenge - If You Can Make it to Malham
  - Pennine Challenge - Harmony in the Limestone Dales
  - Pennine Challenge - Ups and Downs to Alston
  - Pennine Challenge - Bad Jokes in Border Country
- The Lost River of Gaping Gill - Breakthrough (1984)
- Balloon Over Yorkshire—series (1984)
  - Balloon Over Yorkshire - Mansion to Moorland
  - Balloon Over Yorkshire - Search for the Summit Wind
- Realm of Darkness—series
  - Realm of Darkness - The Elusive Depths of Mexico (1984)
  - Realm of Darkness - Hollow Mountain of Mulu (1984)
  - Realm of Darkness - Otter Hole (1984)
  - Realm of Darkness - Hidden Secrets of Cigalère (1985)
  - Realm of Darkness - Caves of Glass (1986)
  - Realm of Darkness - Drowned River of Dracos (1986)
- The Fingertip Phenomenon (1984)
- Rally in the Sky—series (1987)
  - Rally in the Sky - Stage 1
  - Rally in the Sky - Stage 2
- Search Dogs of the Summit (1987)
- Exploring the Great Indoors (1988)
- Adventure: The Climbers (1989)
- The Price of Success (1989)
- Cave Diving Story—series (1989)
  - Cave Diving Story: The Darkness Beckons
  - Cave Diving Story: The Devil is a Gentleman
  - Cave Diving Story: Too High a Price
  - Cave Diving Story: Where Angels Fear
- K2 Triumph and Tragedy (1990)
- Deep into the Labyrinth (1992)
- Hard Decisions at Sleets Gill (1992)
- Mysteries Underground (1992)
- Flight for Life (1994)
- Flight of the Dacron Eagles (1994)
- Gaping Gill - 100 Years of Exploration (1995)
- John Dunne - Big Issue (1998)
- Remembering Pete Livesey—series (1998)
  - Remembering Pete Livesey - Part 1
  - Remembering Pete Livesey - Part 2
  - Remembering Pete Livesey - Part 3
- The Mysterious Life of Caves (2002)
- Jerry (2004)
- You Bet it's a Daft Idea (2005)
- A Tribute to Mike Wooding (2006)
- Off White and the Seven Dwarfs (2007)
- Stump Cross Caverns (2010)
- Limestone the Living Rock—series (2011)
  - Limestone the Living Rock: Limestone Landscapes
  - Limestone the Living Rock: Our Limestone Caves
  - Limestone the Living Rock: Limestone in our Lives
  - Limestone the Living Rock: Lead in our Veins
  - Limestone the Living Rock: A Scar on the Landscape
  - Limestone the Living Rock: The Coldstones Cut
- Eli Simpson and the BSA (2012)
- Eli Simpson - The Birth of a Yorkshire River (2012)
- The Longest Dive (2014)
- In Memory of Mike Boon (2015)
