= Afon Seiont =

River in Gwynedd, Wales

Coordinates: 53°09′N 4°16′W

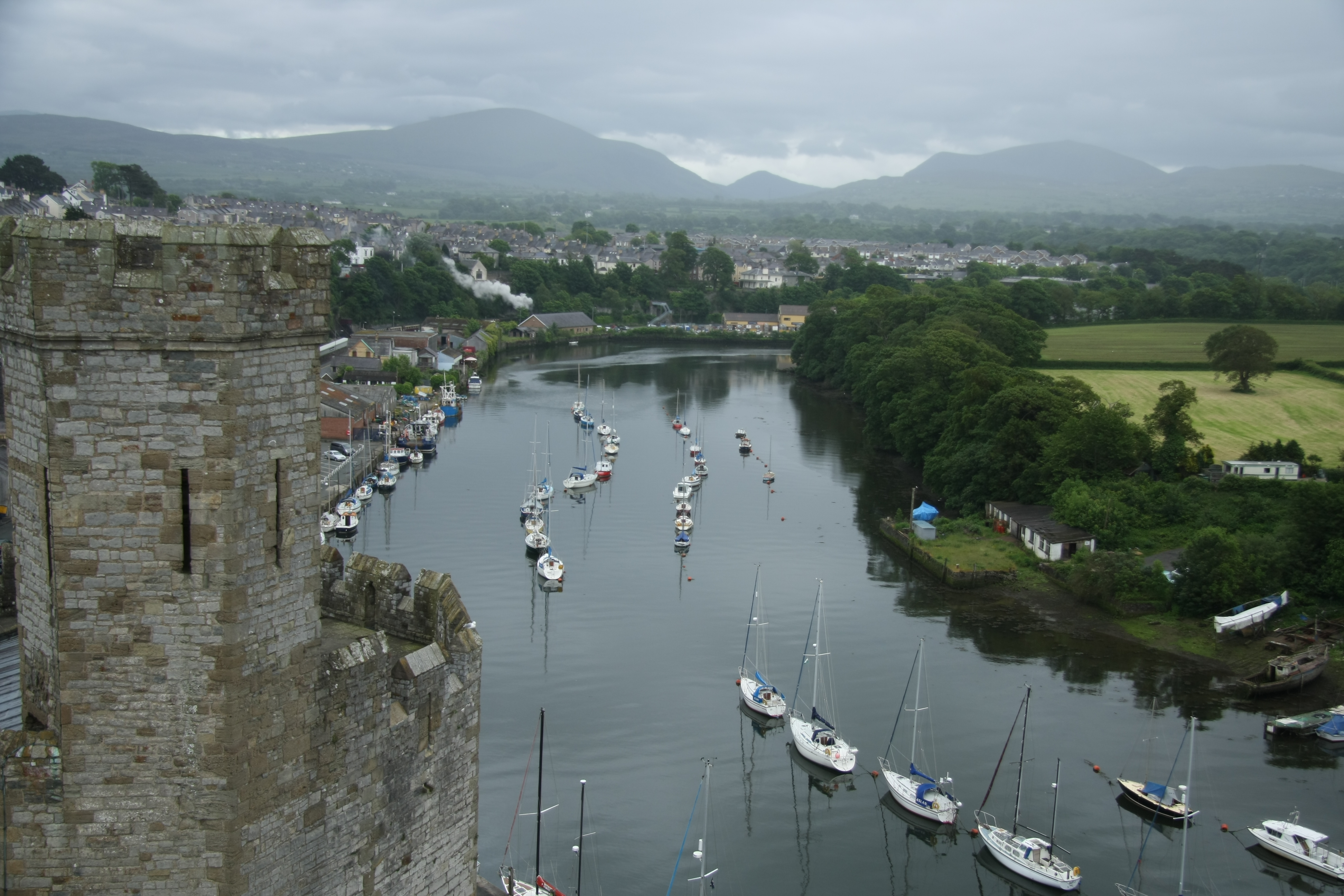
View of Afon Seiont from the tower of Caernarfon Castle

Afon Seiont (Welsh, meaning 'River Seiont' in English) is a river in Gwynedd, Wales which runs into the Menai Strait.

Its source is the outflow of Llyn Padarn near Llanberis, and it flows out in a generally northwest direction. Between the outflow and the village of Llanrug it is known as the Afon Rhythallt, changing its name just after the village. Its mouth is in the town of Caernarfon, forming a natural harbour as it flows out into the Menai Strait. The Afon Nant Peris provides the main inflow into Llyn Peris which then drains into Llyn Padarn with the addition of the waters of the Afon Arddu which drains the northern slopes of Snowdon.

The name of the Roman fort of Segontium, near Caernarfon, is based on the Latinised form of the name 'Seiont'. In the Brythonic language *seg-ontio translates as 'strong place'.

== See also ==
- Aber Afon Seiont - Site of Special Scientific Interest at mouth of river
- List of rivers of Wales
