= Llanberis Pass =

Mountain road in Wales

Coordinates: 53.0903°N 4.0517°W

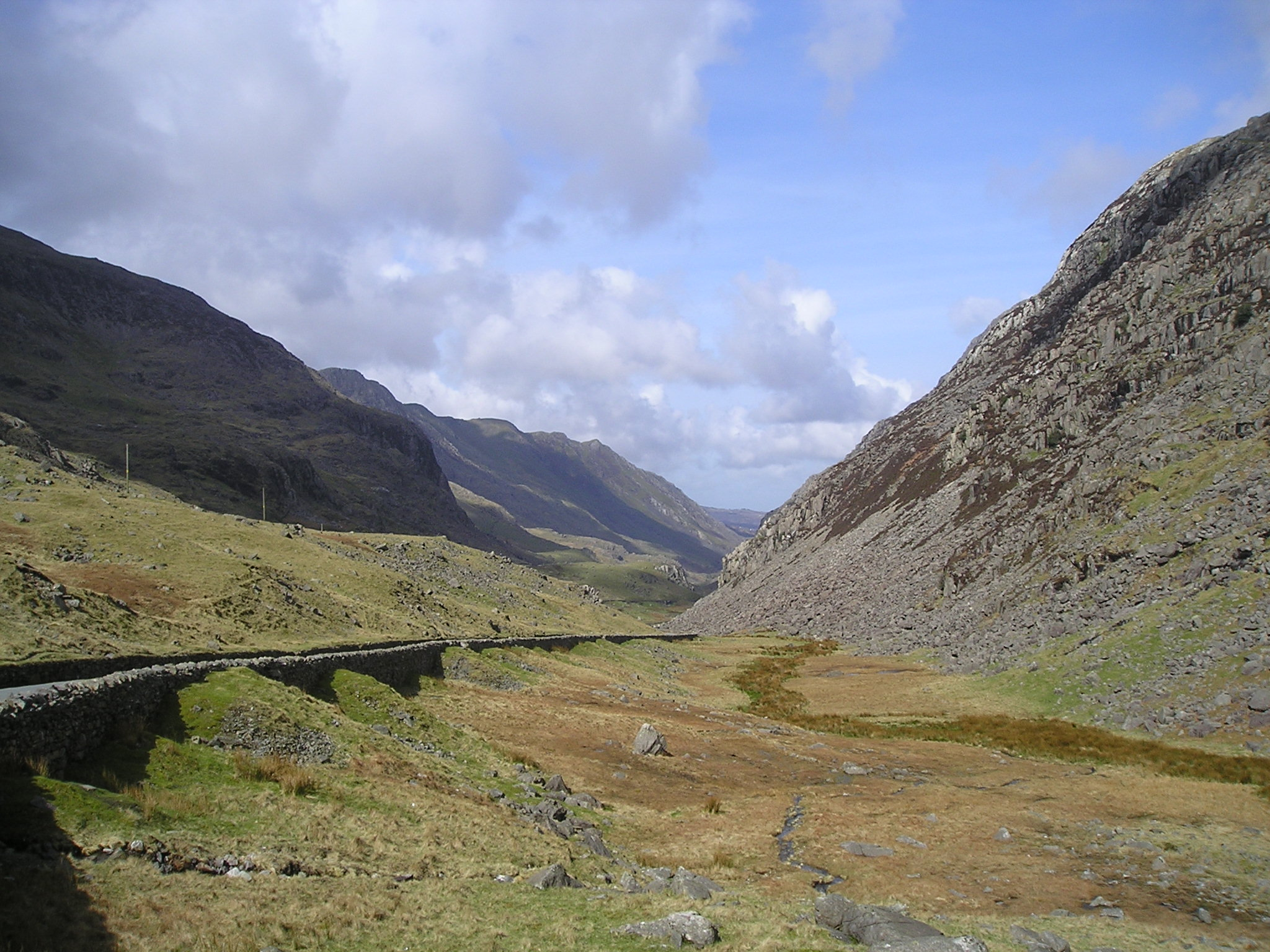
Llanberis Pass

The Llanberis Pass (Welsh: Bwlch Llanberis; alternative English name, Pass of Llanberis) in Snowdonia carries the main road (A4086) from the south-east to Llanberis, over Pen-y-Pass, between the mountain ranges of the Glyderau and the Snowdon massif. At the bottom of the pass is the small village of Nant Peris.

== Geography ==
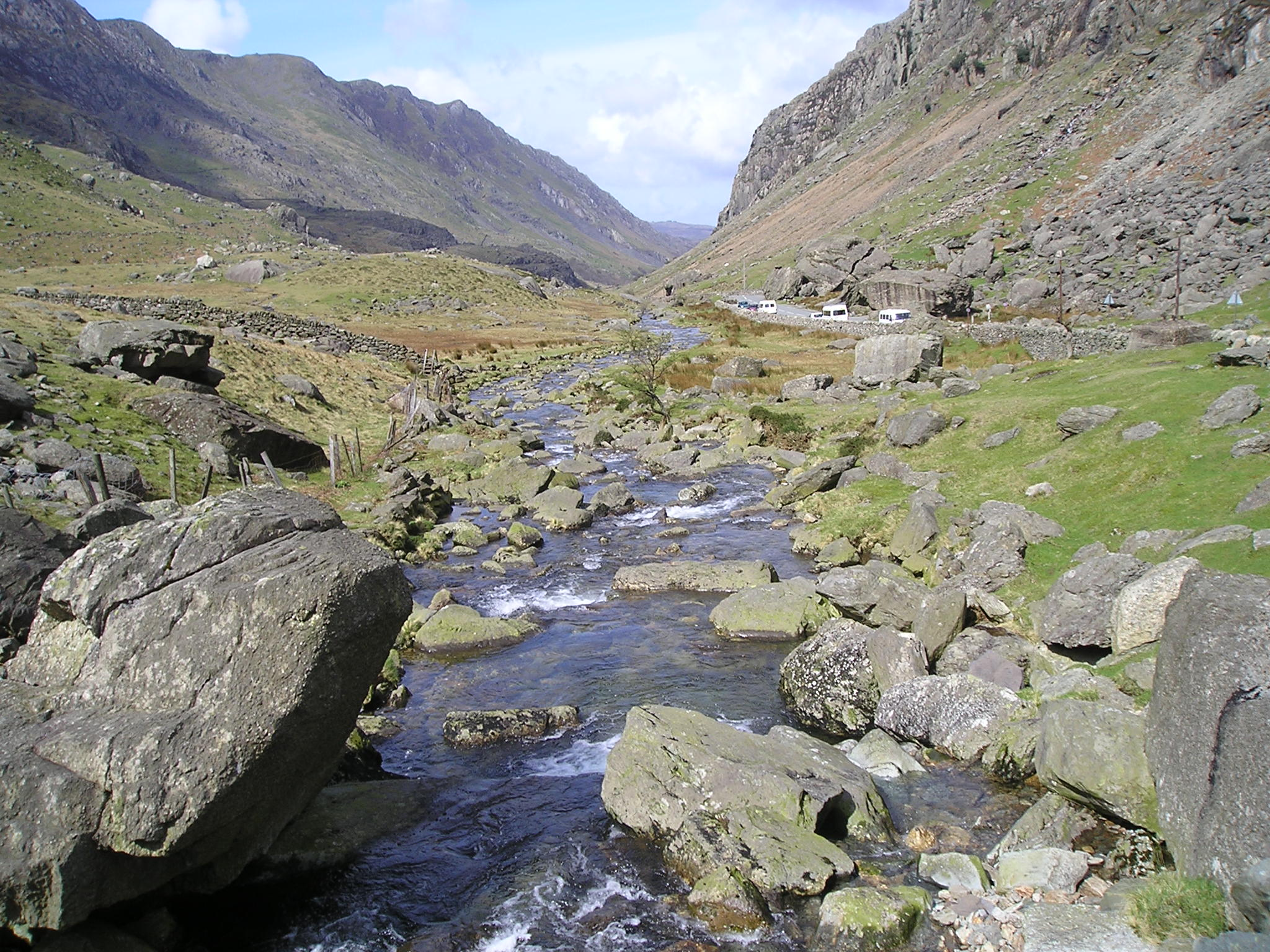
From Cromlech Bridge with the Cromlech boulders on the right

The Llanberis Pass lies between the mountain massifs of Snowdon and the Glyderau in the county of Gwynedd, in northwestern Wales. The summit of the pass is 359 m (1,178 ft) above sea level, and is the site of the Pen-y-Pass Hotel, now a Youth Hostel. The Nant Peris valley lies to the northwest descending to the town of Llanberis, the Llyn Peris and Llyn Padarn lakes and continues on as the Afon Rhythallt to Caernarfon and the Menai Strait. The valley is narrow, straight and steep-sided, with rocky crags and boulders on either side of the road.

About one mile to the east of Pen-y-Pass is the Pen-y-Gwryd Hotel. To the east of this are the headwaters of the Dyffryn Mymbyr, a tributary of the River Llugwy which it joins at Capel Curig. To the south of Pen-y-gwryd are the headwaters of the Afon Glaslyn which flows southwestwards towards Beddgelert.

== Rock climbing ==
Many fine crags are easily accessible from the road, and the area is very popular with rock climbers. On the north side, the principal crags are: Dinas y Gromlech (bearing the famous line of Cenotaph Corner), Carreg Wastad (flat rock), Clogwyn y Grochan (these are together called the Three Cliffs); and further down the valley, Craig Ddu (black rock). On the south side, the principal 'roadside' cliff is Dinas Mot.

The Cromlech Boulders are used for bouldering. These roadside boulders were saved from destruction in a 1973 road widening scheme by a six-year protest by local people, climbers, historians, conservationists, and geologists.

Climbers particularly associated with the area include John Menlove Edwards (in the 1930s and 1940s), Joe Brown (in the 1950s and 1960s), Ron Fawcett and Peter Livesey (in the 1970s), and Johnny Dawes, Jerry Moffatt and John Redhead (in the 1980s). The British 1953 Mount Everest expedition also trained in the area, and were based at the Pen-y-Gwryd Hotel at the eastern end of the pass.

== Access ==
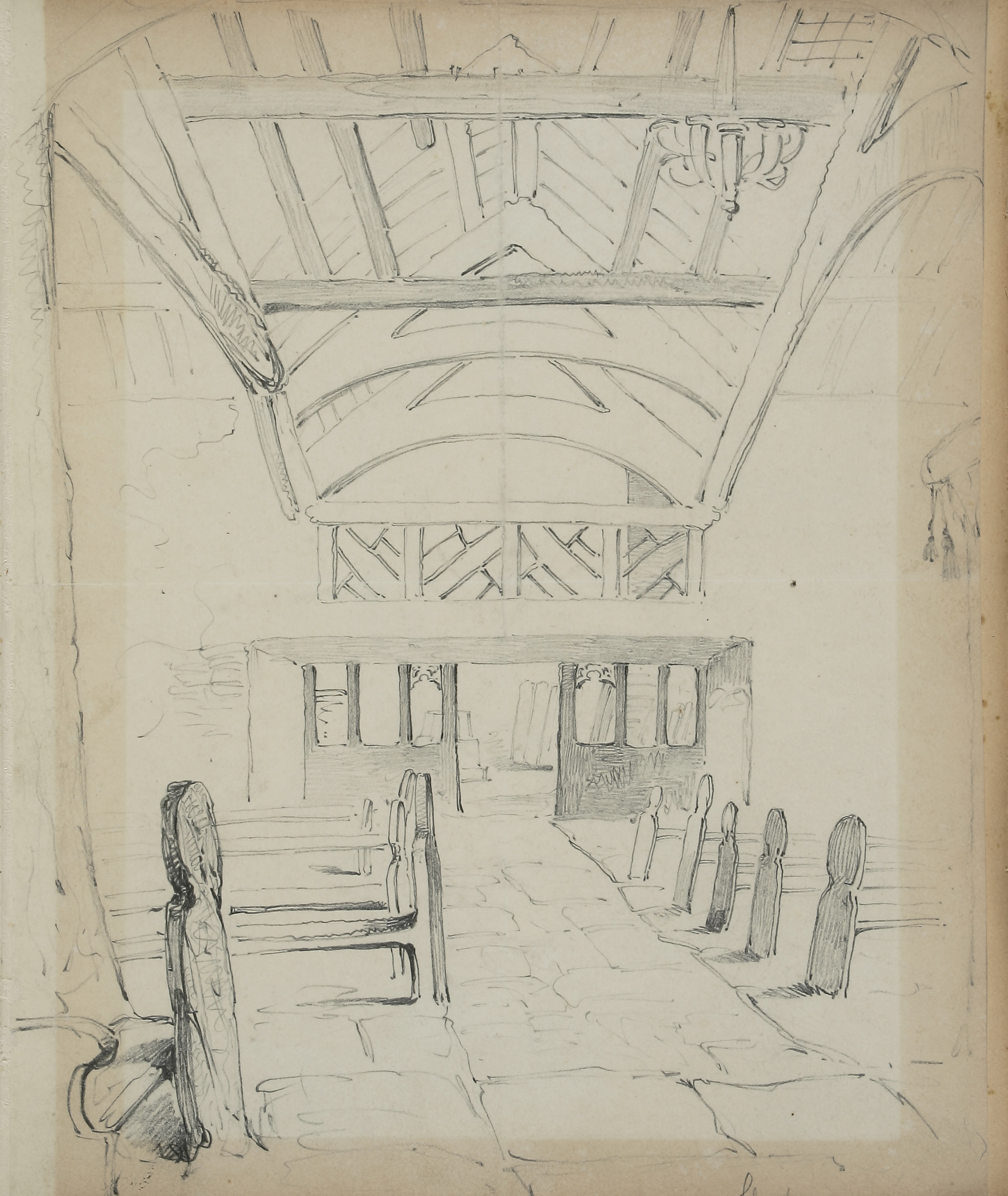
Interior of St Peris's Church, Nant Peris, 1827–1829, Attributed to Henry Harris Lines or Frederick Thomas Lines

At Pen-y-Pass there is a car park and a cafe, and three different footpaths set off up Snowdon, as well as two others to the east leading to the summits of Glyder Fawr and Glyder Fach. the car park is usually full and a shuttle bus service from Llanberis, with a park and ride runs from near the Vaynol Arms. The Snowdonia Sherpa bus service network run by Express Motors and GHA Coaches operates frequent services between Betws-y-Coed, Capel Curig, Pen-y-Gwryd and Pen-y-Pass and also between Pen-y-Pass, Nant Peris (where there are park and ride facilities) and Llanberis.

== See also ==
- Clogwyn Du'r Arddu, a mountain crag in Snowdonia
- Dinorwic quarry, a slate climbing area near Llanberis
