= Gilfach Ddu railway station =

Intermediate railway station in Llanberis, Gwynedd, Wales

Gilfach Ddu (LLR)
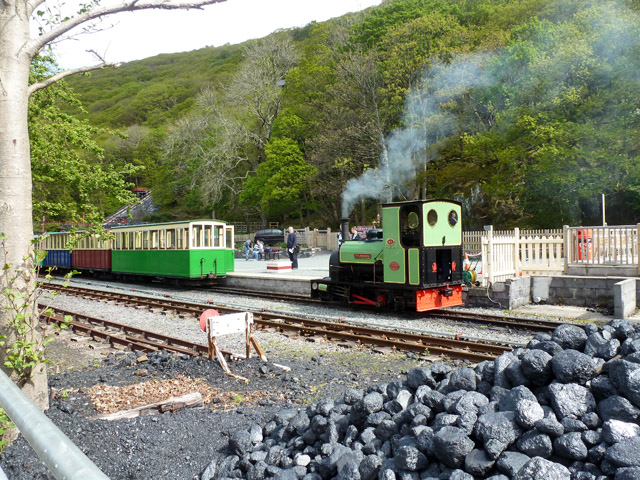
- Loco Dolbadarn at Gilfach Ddu station

General information
- Location: Llanberis, Gwynedd; Wales
- Coordinates: 53.122507°N 4.115131°W
- Grid reference: SH 585 604
- System: Station on heritage railway
- Platforms: 1

History
- Original company: Llanberis Lake Railway

Key dates
- 28 May 1971: Opened
Location

Gilfach Ddu (LLR) railway station is an intermediate station on the Llanberis Lake Railway (LLR), located in Llanberis, Gwynedd, Wales.

Most of the LLR was laid around 1970 on part of the trackbed of the closed and lifted Padarn Railway. The line opened between Gilfach Ddu and Cei Llydan on 28 May 1971, being extended northwards to Penllyn (LLR) in 1972. For thirty years Gilfach Ddu was the new line's southern terminus, situated a short distance south of the site of the Padarn Railway's former workmen's station, also named Gilfach Ddu. In 2003 a wholly new extension was opened south westwards, with Llanberis (LLR) station as the line's new southern terminus. With this extension Gilfach Ddu (LLR) changed from a terminus to a through station.

The line and station primarily serve tourists and railway enthusiasts.

The station has one platform.

Preceding station	Heritage railways	Following station
Cei Llydan towards Penllyn	Llanberis Lake Railway	Llanberis Terminus
