= Penllyn railway station (Wales) =

Railway station on the Welsh Highland Railway, Wales

Penllyn
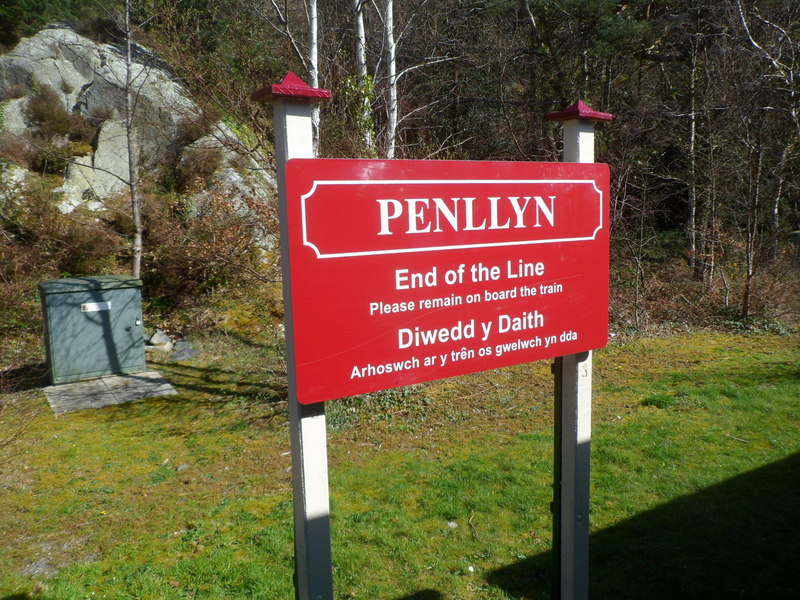
- Warning sign at Penllyn terminus

General information
- Location: Llanberis, Gwynedd; Wales
- Coordinates: 53.1390°N 4.1533°W
- Grid reference: SH 560 623
- System: Station on heritage railway
- Platforms: 0

History
- Original company: Llanberis Lake Railway

Key dates
- 10 June 1972: Opened
Location

Penllyn (LLR) railway station is the northern terminus of the Llanberis Lake Railway (LLR), located near Llanberis, Gwynedd, Wales. The station has no platform, but passengers are allowed to alight.

Most of the LLR was laid around 1970 on part of the trackbed of the closed and lifted Padarn Railway. The line opened between Gilfach Ddu (LLR) and Cei Llydan on 28 May 1971, being extended northwards to Penllyn in 1972, changing Cei Llydan from a terminus to a through station. For thirty years Gilfach Ddu (LLR) was the new line's southern terminus, situated a short distance south of the site of the Padarn Railway's former workmen's station, also named Gilfach Ddu. In 2003 a wholly new extension was opened south westwards, with Llanberis (LLR) station as the line's new southern terminus. With this extension Gilfach Ddu (LLR) changed from a terminus to a through station.

Penllyn (LLR) is situated a short distance south of the site of the former Padarn Railway Pen-y-Llyn workmen's station.

The line and station primarily serve tourists and railway enthusiasts.

Preceding station	Heritage railways	Following station
Terminus	Llanberis Lake Railway	Cei Llydan towards Llanberis
