= Penllyn =

Penllyn may refer to the following places:

== United States ==
- Penllyn, a village in Lower Gwynedd Township, Montgomery County, Pennsylvania

== Wales ==
- Penllyn, Gwynedd, a former civil parish in Gwynedd (1894–1974)
- Penllyn, Vale of Glamorgan, a village and community in the Vale of Glamorgan
- Penllyn (cantref), an ancient cantref of Gwynedd

== See also ==
- Penllyn railway station (disambiguation)
- Pen-Llyn, Anglesey
- Llŷn Peninsula, Gwynedd, known in Welsh as Pen Llŷn
