= Llanberis railway station (Llanberis Lake Railway) =

Railway station in Llanberis, Wales

Llanberis (LLR)
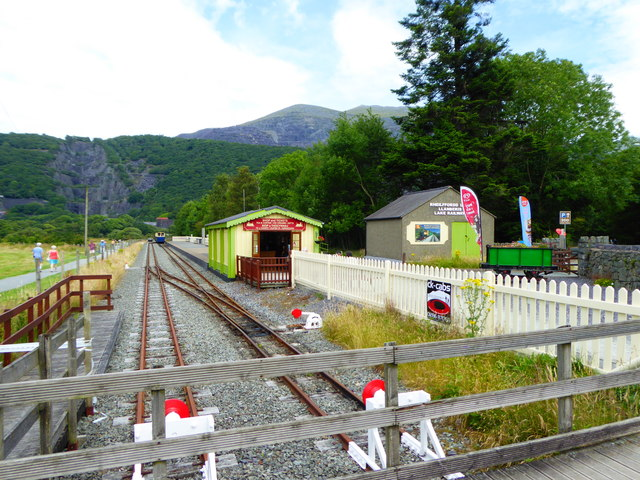
- Llanberis Lake Railway, Llanberis terminus

General information
- Location: Llanberis, Gwynedd; Wales
- Coordinates: 53.1174°N 4.1194°W
- Grid reference: SH 582 599
- System: Station on heritage railway
- Platforms: 1

History
- Original company: Llanberis Lake Railway

Key dates
- 6 June 2003: Opened
Route map
Location

Llanberis (LLR) railway station is the southern terminus of the Llanberis Lake Railway (LLR), located in Llanberis, Gwynedd, Wales. The line and station primarily serve tourists and railway enthusiasts.

Most of the LLR was laid around 1970 on the trackbed of the closed and lifted Padarn Railway. The line opened between Gilfach Ddu (LLR) and Cei Llydan on 28 May 1971, being extended northwards to Penllyn (LLR) in 1972. For thirty years the new line's southern terminus was Gilfach Ddu (LLR), situated a short distance south of the site of the Padarn Railway's former workmen's station, also named Gilfach Ddu. In 2003 a wholly new extension was opened south westwards, with Llanberis (LLR) station as the line's new southern terminus.

The single platform station stands opposite Llanberis (SMR) station, the lower terminus of the Snowdon Mountain Railway, and not far from the site of the long-closed Llanberis standard gauge station.

Preceding station	Heritage railways	Following station
Gilfach Ddu towards Penllyn	Llanberis Lake Railway	Terminus
Change for the Snowdon Mountain Railway at Llanberis (SMR), on the other side of the A4086 road
