= St Peris's Church, Nant Peris =

St Peris's Church
- Eglwys Sant Peris
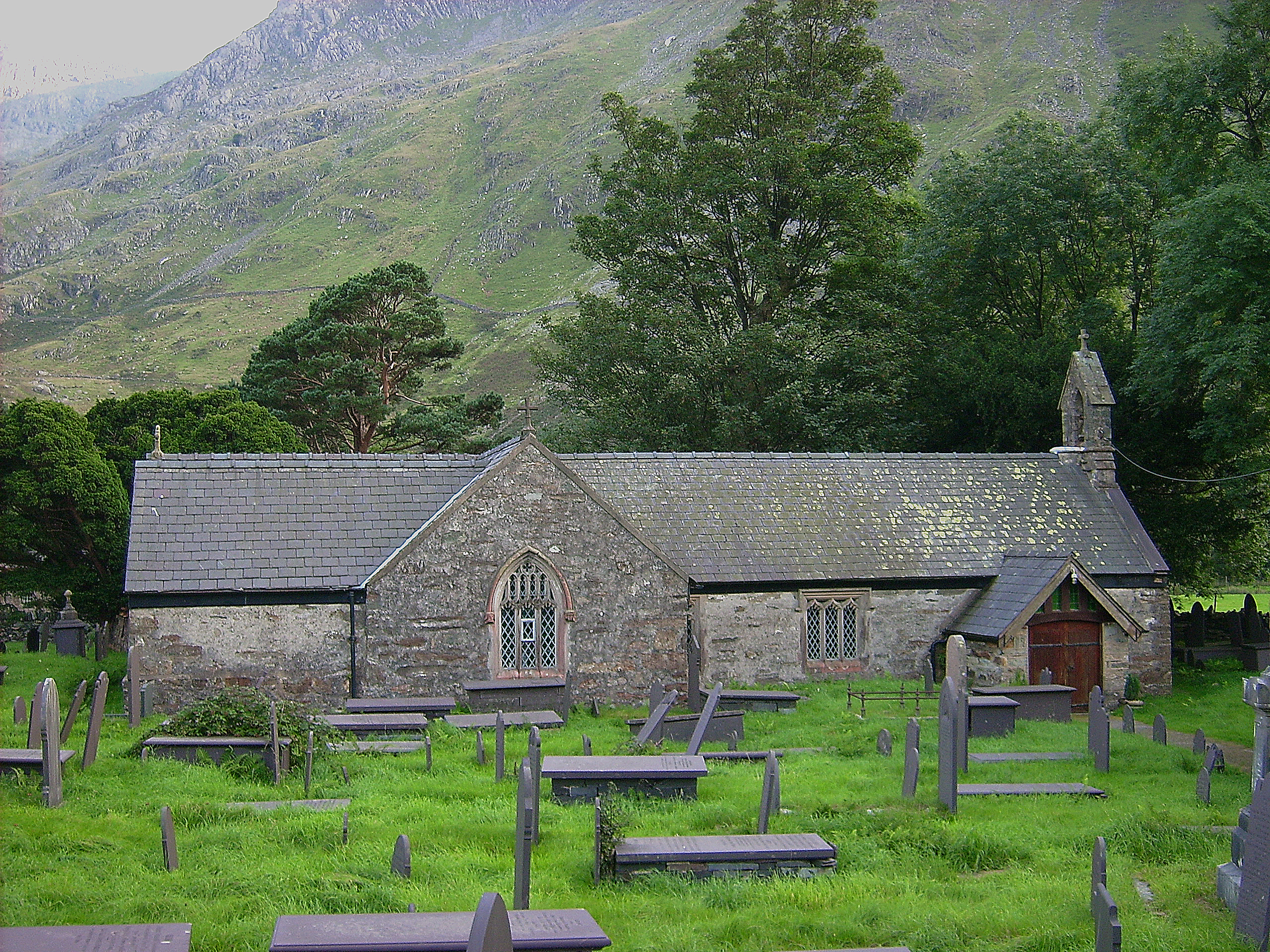
- St Peris's Church
- St Peris's Church
- OS grid reference: SH606582
- Location: Nant Peris, Gwynedd
- Country: Wales
- Denomination: Church in Wales

History
- Status: Parish church
- Dedication: Saint Peris

Architecture
- Heritage designation: Grade II* listed building

Specifications
- Length: 55 feet (17 m)

Administration
- Diocese: Diocese of Bangor
- Archdeaconry: Bangor
- Deanery: Synod Bangor
- Parish: Bro Eryri

Saint Peris's Church is a parish church of the Church in Wales in Nant Peris, Gwynedd, Wales.

== History ==
The church of St Peris is in the village Nant Peris. Originally the village was known as Llanberis, but in the 19th century the new development 4 kilometres (2.5 mi) north west lower down in the valley took the name Llanberis, and the old village became Old Llanberis, and then Nant Peris.

The church dates from at least the 14th century. The transepts are 15th- or 16th-century. The church was extended eastwards and the chancel rebuilt in the 17th century.

A restoration was carried out by Henry Kennedy of Bangor in 1848, and again in 1893 when the church was re-plastered and re-decorated, with some new joinery work for £230 (equivalent to £25,553 in 2025). More work was completed in 1899 when the walls were boarded, an oak reredos installed and encaustic tiles laid round the altar. This was carried out by Evan Parry of Menai Bridge.

The lychgate dates from 1929.

== Stained glass ==
The east window was the gift of John Christopher Lloyd Williams in 1926 and was designed by W. Aikman.

== Parish ==
The church is in the parish of Bro Eryri, which encompasses:

- Christ Church, Deiniolen
- St Deiniol's Church, Llanddeiniolen
- St Helen's Church, Penisa'r Waun
- St Michael's Church, Llanrug
- St Padarn's Church, Llanberis
