= Llanberis railway station =

Llanberis railway station may refer to the following railway stations in Llanberis, Wales

- Llanberis railway station (London and North Western Railway), a standard gauge station closed in 1964
- Llanberis railway station (Llanberis Lake Railway), the southern terminus of the Llanberis Lake Railway
- Llanberis railway station (Snowdon Mountain Railway), the lower terminus of the Snowdon Mountain Railway
