= St Padarn's Church =

St Padarn's Church may refer to:

- St Padarn's Church, Llanbadarn Fawr, near Aberystwyth, Ceredigion, Wales
- St Padarn's Church, Llanberis, Gwynedd, Wales
