= Francis–Barnett =

Defunct motorcycle manufacturer

Francis-Barnett
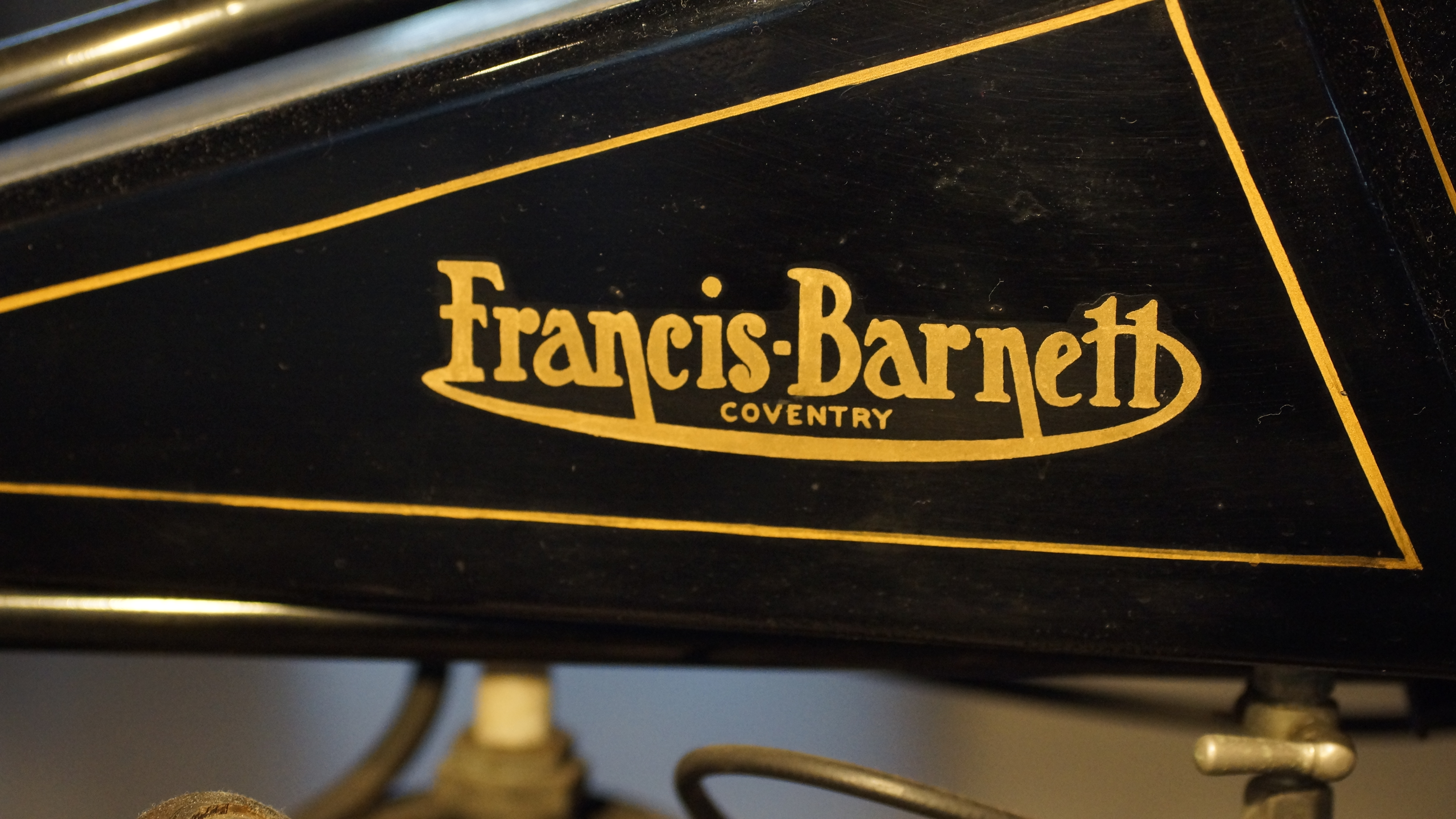
- Fuel tank on a 1924 Francis-Barnett motorcycle
- Industry: Motorcycle
- Founded: 1919
- Founders: Gordon Francis; Arthur Barnett
- Defunct: 1966
- Fate: liquidated
- Headquarters: Coventry, UK
- Parent: from 1947: Associated Motor Cycles

Francis & Barnett Limited was an English motorcycle manufacturer from 1919 to 1966. Gordon Inglesby Francis and Arthur Barnett founded the company, which was based in Lower Ford Street, Coventry, until 1962. In 1947, Associated Motor Cycles (AMC) took over Francis-Barnett. In 1957, AMC merged Francis-Barnett with James in Birmingham; and in 1962, Francis-Barnett production moved to the James factory. In 1966, Manganese Bronze Holdings took over AMC and terminated production of both Francis-Barnett and James.

Francis-Barnett motorcycles were nicknamed "Franny B" or "Fanny B". They were built with small engines, up to 350 cc (21 cu in), for affordable private transport and for use in motorcycle sport. Most Francis-Barnett motorcycles were built with Villiers two-stroke engines, until in 1959 AMC introduced its own range of single-cylinder two-stroke engines, made in-house, for both Francis-Barnett and James motorcycles.

== History ==
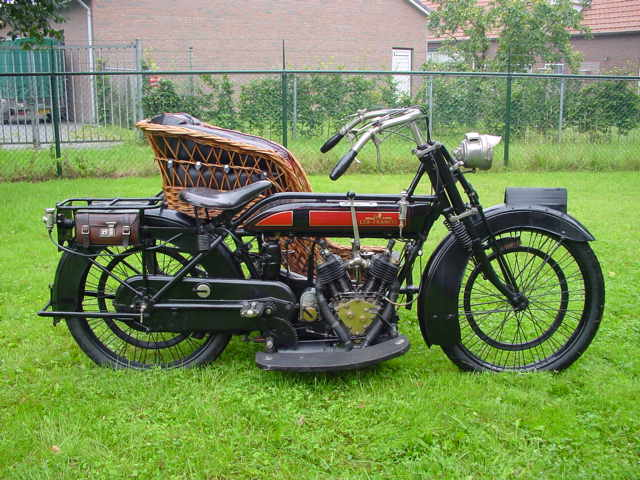
1914 Lea-Francis V-twin

Richard Henry Lea and Graham Francis founded the Lea-Francis bicycle and motorcycle company in Coventry in 1895. Graham Francis' son Gordon started his career in the workshop of Bayliss Thomas and Company Limited in Lower Ford Street, Coventry, who made Excelsior motorcycles. He married the daughter of one of his colleagues at Bayliss Thomas, Arthur Barnett, who later founded his own company, Invicta motorcycles.

In 1919, Gordon Francis and Arthur Barnett went into partnership to make motorcycles together. The first Francis-Barnett models were little more than re-badged Invicta motorcycles. In the 1920s, Francis-Barnett made supple sheet metal work and pressings for the motor industry that proved successful. By 1947, Francis-Barnett had taken over Clarendon Pressings and Welding Company Limited. In 1948, output was increased, and industrial trolleys and pressed fabricated parts for the motor industry were made. Photographs and story of Clarendon Pressings and Welding Company, in Clarendon Street, Earlsdon, Coventry.

The first new Francis–Barnett motorcycle had a J.A.P. 292cc side valve engine; two-speed Sturmey-Archer gearbox; and bright red and black fuel tank. Production costs were an early problem.

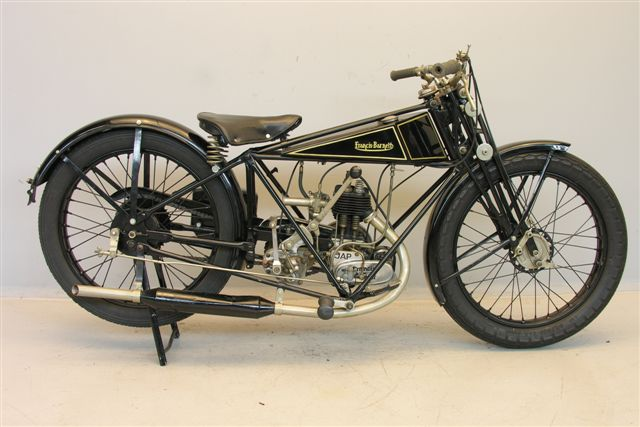
1926 Francis–Barnett with 175 cc J.A.P. side valve engine

Gordon Francis had served in the British Army, working in a motor transport workshop, where he saw motorcycles with damaged frames. He considered a frame of bolted straight tubes as a simple alternative. He studied the problem of frequent fractures of motorcycle frames. He overcame cost by evolving a frame of six straight tubes, with one of the pairs specially formed. From the hub of the rear wheel, as far as the saddle and footrest, the frame formed a triangle. From the seat and steering head, down to the engine crankcase, the frame formed an inverted triangle. The fuel tank was held in place by similarly formed tubes. The frame could be bolted together with basic tools. In 1923, Francis exhibited a machine with this type of frame at Olympia, London.

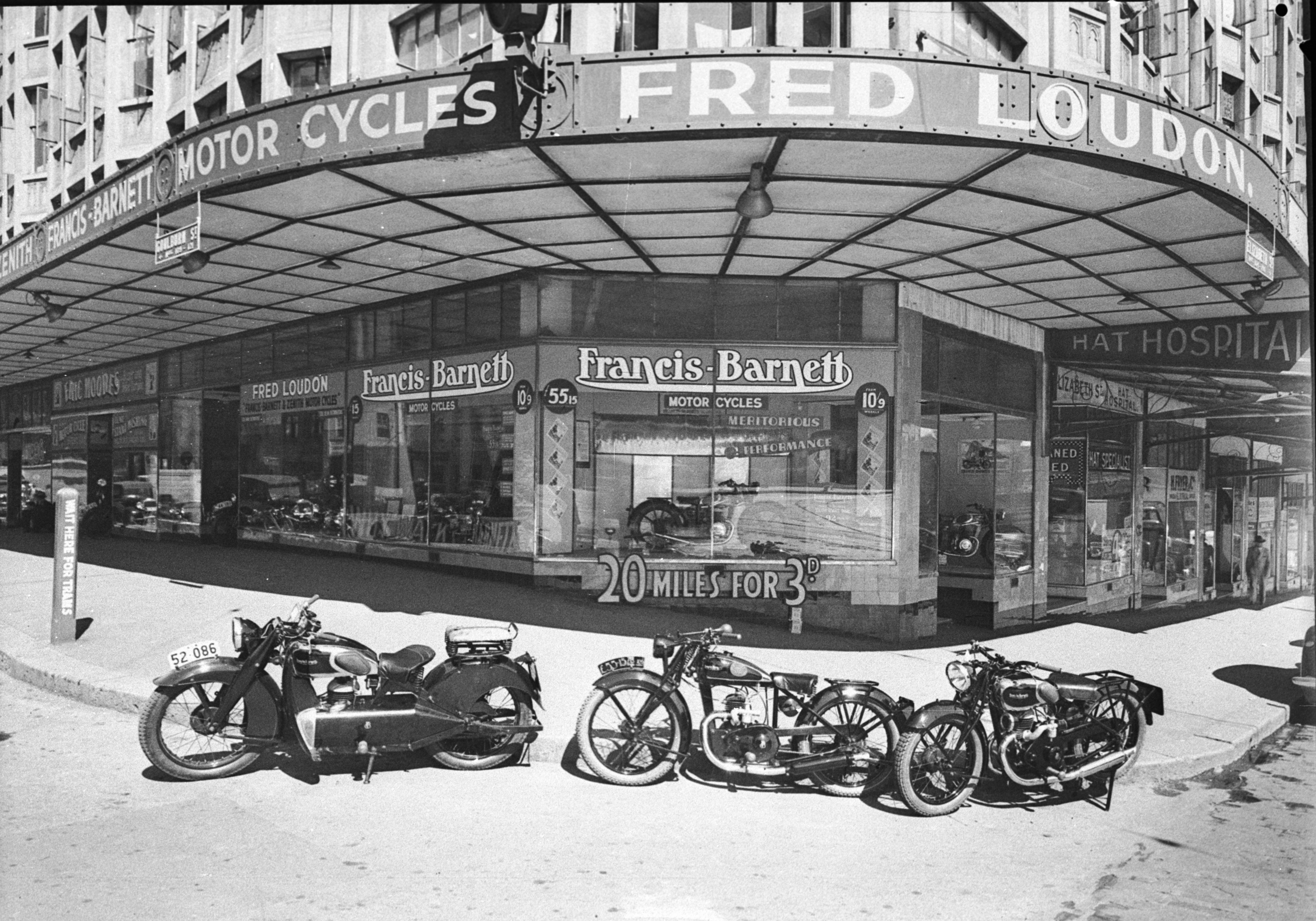
Fred Loudon's Francis-Barnett showroom in Sydney, New South Wales, in 1938

Riders such as Thomas G "Tommy" Meeten took part at Brooklands and Scottish Six Days Trial (SSDT) and stunts such as riding up Snowdon. On 12 July 1928, three riders started at the foot of Snowdon at Llanberis railway station: John Moxon and Geoffrey Jones from Villiers, and Eric Barnett from Francis-Barnett. They completed the 3,270-foot (1,000 m) ascent in 22 minutes. The Supersport 172cc 2 3/4HP was awarded gold and silver medals at the SSDT in 1924.

Continuing with cost and simplicity in mind, the new wheels of the new Francis-Barnett were on spindles for easy removal. The 147cc Villiers two-stroke engine with flywheel magneto was light with a two-speed Albion gearbox, a three-speed was an option, and easily reassembled at a low cost. The construction came with a no-breakage guarantee forever. Other 250cc and 350cc machines were also produced with a sidecars as an option. The Pullman model followed in 1928 with a 344cc vertical in-line two-stroke Villiers engine. From 1928 to 1930, the black motorcycles followed the fashion and were coloured cream. They reverted to black in 1931, and to Arden Green around 1947.

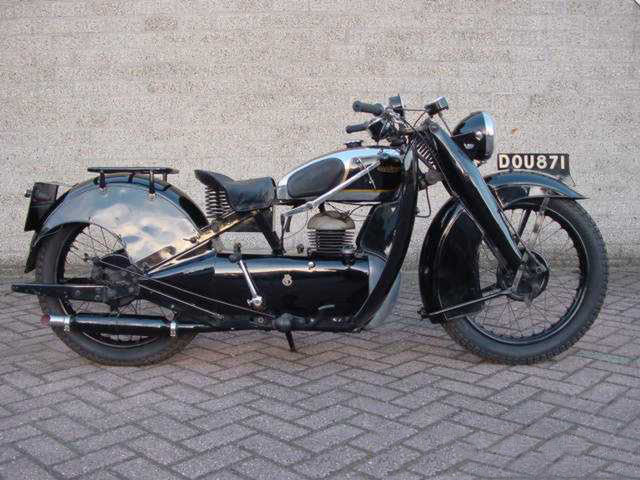
1940 Francis-Barnett K 39 Cruiser

In 1932, Francis-Barnett introduced the 250 cc Cruiser model. This has a fairing that encases the engine to protect the rider from oil, and leg shields and fully-valanced mudguards to protect the rider from road dirt. The cruiser was one of the first motorcycles to have an enclosed engine. A 1940 K39 Cruiser used to be in the National Motor Museum, Beaulieu, but has now been sold.

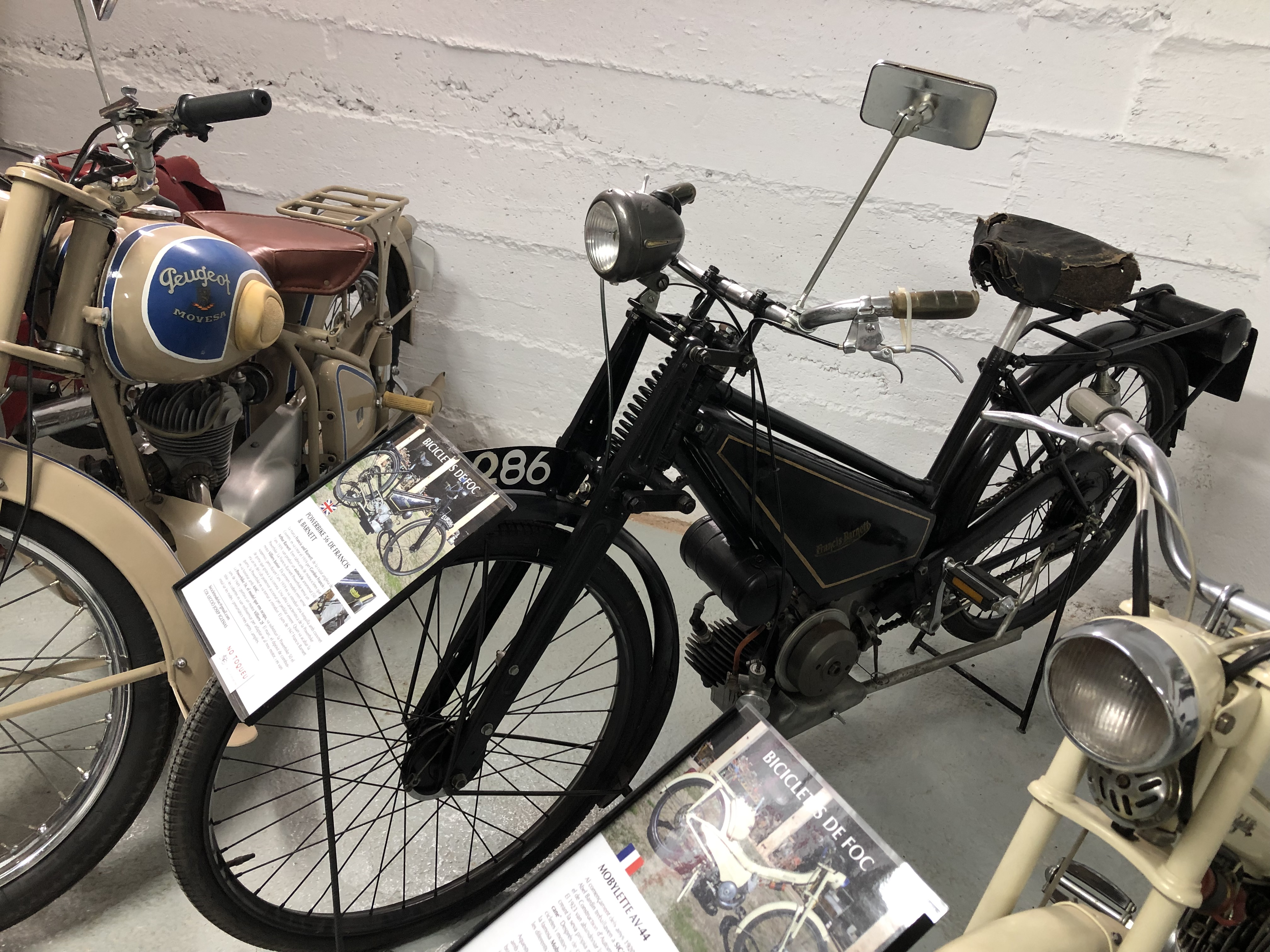
1949 Francis-Barnett Powerbike 56

In 1937 Arthur Barnett died, aged 74. His son Eric succeeded him as Sales Director. Eric Barnett was killed by a lorry that failed to stop in 1963. From 1938, Francis-Barnett made its new 98cc Powerbike model, alongside the 125cc Snipe. These were intended for military use soon after the outbreak of World War Two. Air raids on Coventry in 1940 destroyed the Francis-Barnett factory. The company continued making parts during the war at another site. Production at Lower Ford Street resumed in 1945 with the 98cc Powerbike and then the 125cc Merlin. The Plover, Falcon and Kestrel models followed.

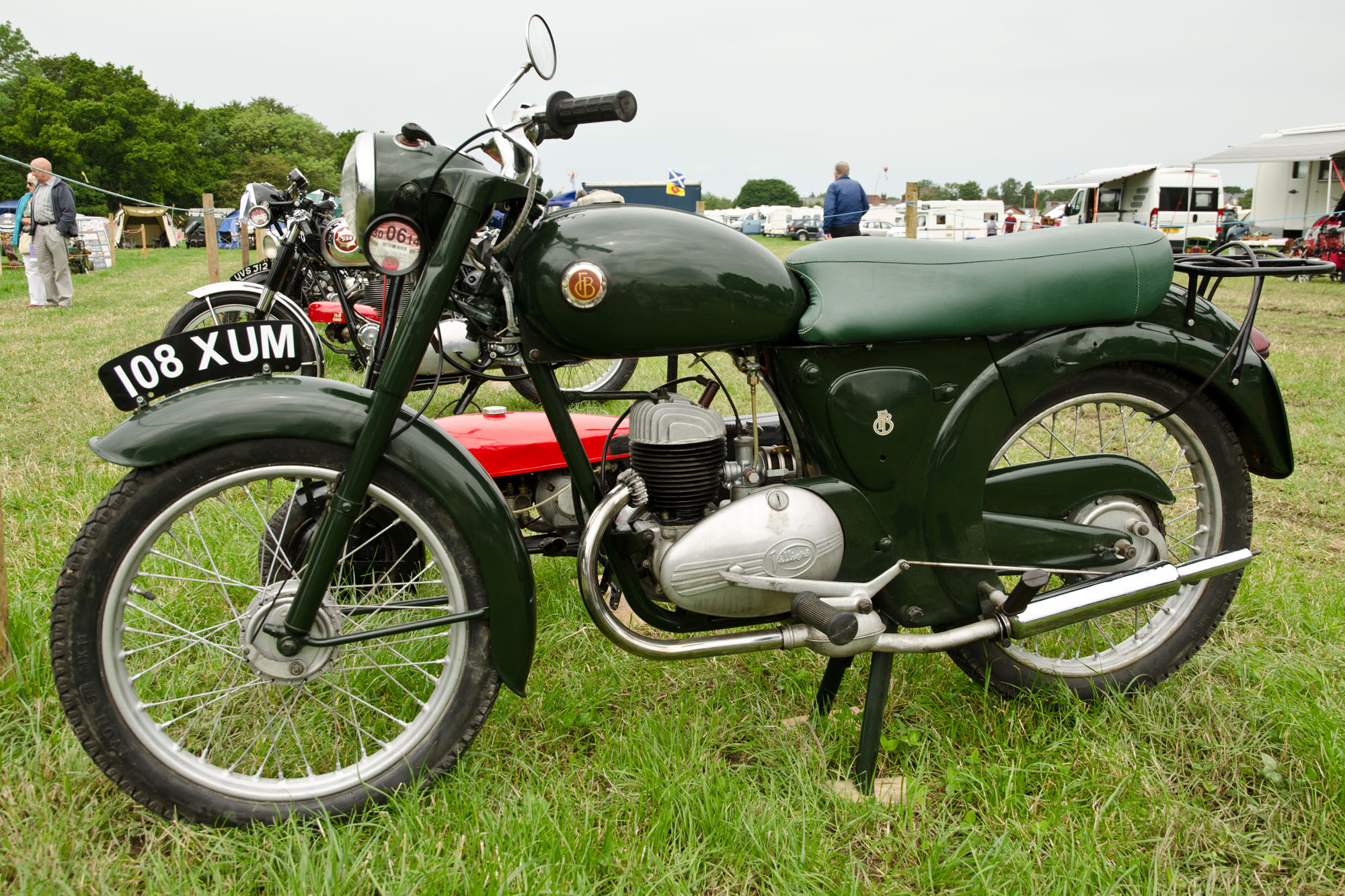
1959 Francis-Barnett 150cc Plover

Associated Motor Cycles took over Francis-Barnett in 1947. About that time, Francis-Barnett revived the Cruiser model name with a 171cc AMC-engined Light Cruiser. The motorcycles Plover, Falcon and Cruiser were successful in the 1950s as lightweight machines. Most were painted a dark green, which Francis-Barnett called Arden Green. Previously, Francis-Barnett had painted most of its motorcycles black.

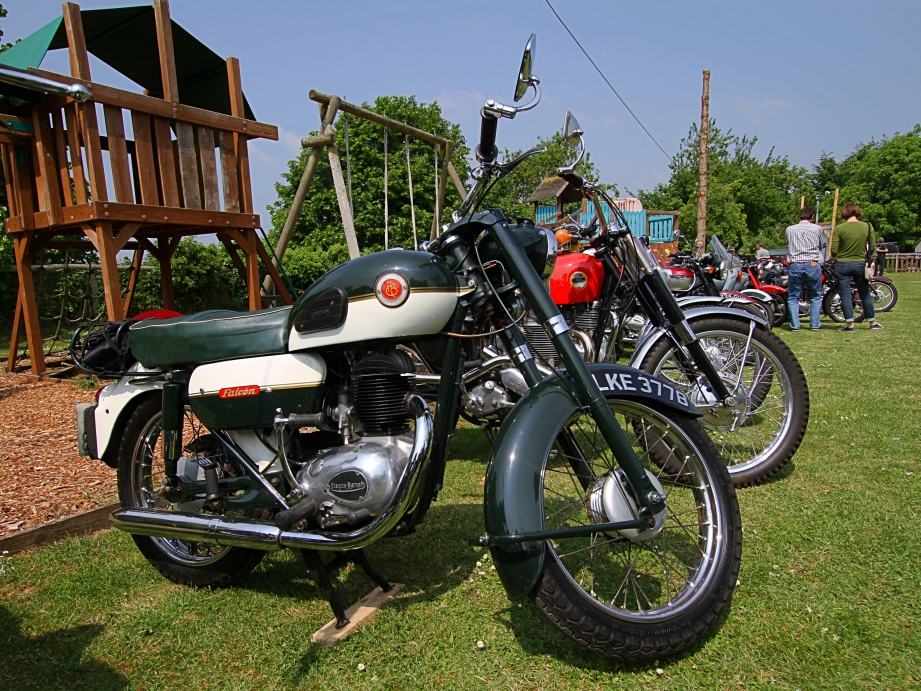
1964 Francis-Barnett Model 87 Falcon with 199cc Piatti / AMC 20T engine

AMC considered Villiers of Wolverhampton to be dictatorial, so it commissioned Italian designer Vincenzo Piatti to design a range of new engines to replace the Villiers ones. AMC made Piatti engines in-house and installed them in Francis-Barnett motorcycles from about 1959 onward. However, the Piatti engines proved unreliable. In the 1960s, AMC reverted some Francis-Barnett models to Villiers engines. The Falcon 87 with a 199cc single cylinder two-stroke AMC engine was introduced in 1959, and remained in production until 1966. Also, that year, the Cruiser 84 with a fully enclosed rear wheel and leg shields as standard equipment was available.

In the late 1950s, AMC tried to dispense with buying engines from Villiers by commissioning Italian engineer Vincenzo Piatti to design a new range of single-cylinder two-stroke engines. They were to be made in four sizes: 150cc, 175cc, 200cc, and 250cc. AMC knew Piatti from his innovative, but commercially unsuccessful, Piatti scooter. AMC constrained Piatti by specifying low cost rather than quality. This led Piatti to devise a conservative design. The engines were poorly manufactured by AMC and soon gained a reputation for unreliability.

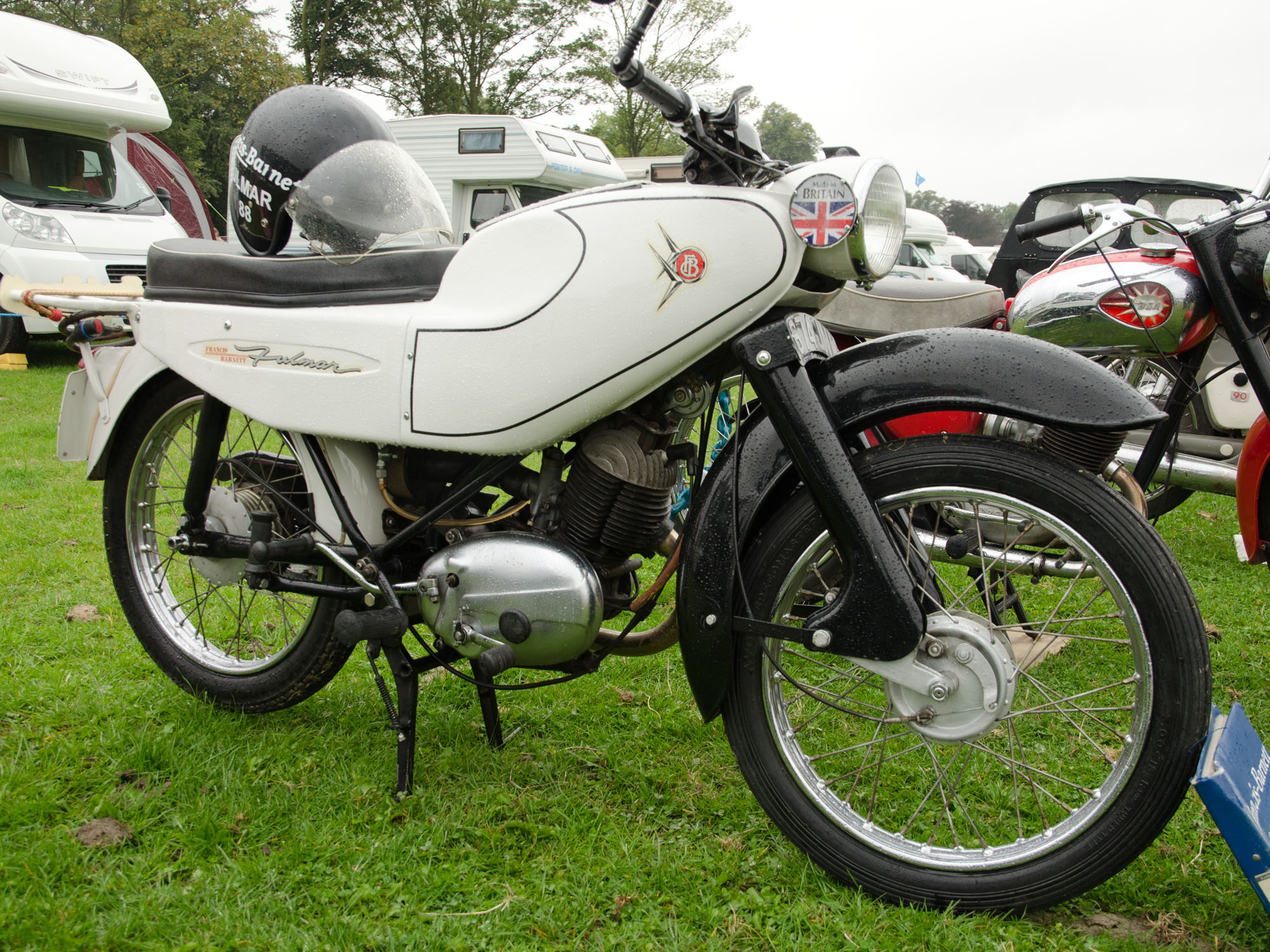
1964 Francis-Barnett Fulmar 88

In 1962, AMC closed the Francis-Barnett factory in Coventry and moved production to the James factory at Greet, Birmingham. Some Francis-Barnett staff were transferred to James. The James and Francis-Barnett ranges became almost identical, badge-engineered with differences only in colour and name. The last new Francis-Barnett model was launched in 1962, the newly designed Fulmar with a spine frame, pressed steel body, leading link fork, and 149cc AMC engine. Francis-Barnett production ended on 4 August 1966 when Manganese Bronze Holdings took over AMC. Both Francis-Barnett and James ceased to exist in October of that year.

In early series of the British television drama Heartbeat, a 1961 Francis-Barnett Falcon 87 features as the police motorcycle. In later series it was replaced with a 650cc BSA Golden Flash.

== Francis–Barnett Powerbike and motorcycle models 1919–1966 ==
List of models:

- 1919/1925 – Francis–Barnett badged Invicta with 269cc Villiers four-stroke engine, 346cc four-stroke engine, 678cc side valve J.A.P. four-stroke engine with chain drive, and 499cc Abingdon four-stroke engine. A Francis-Barnett badged Invicta took part in the Isle of Man TT in 1922 but failed to finish. By 1923, Francis-Barnett had continued with just 247cc, 292cc and 346cc four-stroke engines.
- 1921/1925 – 292cc J.A.P. side valve four-stroke engine, Coventry chain and Dunlop belt drive and neat chain cover, comes with two-speed Sturmey Archer gearbox. Noted for its Red and black distinctive petrol tank, it also came with quick-adjusting rear brake, footboards, toe guards and sprung forks.
- 1921/1925 – 346cc J.A.P. four-stroke engine with three-speed Sturmey Archer gearbox, change lever mounted with gearbox.
- 1921/1925 – Model 250 with 247cc J.A.P. four-stroke engine; Model 350 with 346cc J.A.P. all chain drive four-stroke engine. Code-named "Zarteetee", the bike raced in the 1923 Isle of Man TT, finishing 21st out of 41 riders taking part. From 1923, both 250cc and 350cc machines were sold with sidecars.
- 1923/1930 – Models 1, 2, 3, 4, 4B, 147cc (1 1/2HP) Villiers engine with Albion two-speed gearbox. Model 1 was push start and belt drive, known as the "zarabout", with optional extras of clutch and kickstarter, model 2, was belt drive with kickstarter, models 3, and 4, were chain drive. Models 1,2 and 3 had no front brake, and the handlebar lever was a secondary control for the rear brake – the second brake required by law. Model 4, 4B, had a Villiers 2T engine and a three-speed optional extra gearbox, front and rear expanding hub brakes and leg shields. All were coloured throughout in black.
- 1925/1929 – Aza, 147cc J.A.P. two-stroke engines with three-speed gearbox, clutch and kickstarter. Aza engines were made by J.A.P. in Northumberland Park, London.
- 1925/1929 – Aza, 175cc J.A.P. two-stroke engines with three-speed gearbox, clutch and kickstarter. Finished in black.
- 1923/1930 – Model 5, 7 and 9, 1 3/4HP 172cc Villiers engine, three-speed clutch and quiet start, belt chain drive and model 9 256cc Empire models; rare models are fitted with 196cc engines: Model 9 172cc was coloured black with maroon tank and the TT model all black. During 1928 and 1929, the UK War Office tested the Empire model 9 two-strokes fitted with Pullman 344cc frames. Due to durability problems with the two-stroke engine, they went with other manufacturers.
- 1922/1928 – Sports 147cc Villiers 1 3/4HP chain drive model and three-speed Albion gearbox. Colour: black. Supersport 172cc Villiers 2 3/4HP with Albion three-speed gearbox – awarded Gold and silver medals at the Scottish Six Days Trial.
- 1924–1927 – A Francis-Barnett with a 172cc, 3.5 HP, overhead valve Blackburne four stroke engine specially built for Tommy Meeten, achieved sixth place in the 1924 Isle of Man TT for ultra-lightweight motorcycles and raced in the sidecar event. It had a lightweight aluminium sidecar, which survives in the Vintage Coventry collection of the Coventry Transport Museum (part of the Vintage Jaguar Section).
- 1928–1930 Model 10 Pullman: vertical twin in-line 344cc two-stroke Villiers engine and three-speed gearbox. This model was made in limited numbers. It was coloured cream from 1928 to 1930, to follow the fashion of the time. Some early examples were in black. They were discontinued due to cooling problems.
- 1927 – 172cc Brooklands Track Special; coloured dark green; built and raced by Tommy Meeten. It had a long-range fuel tank and achieved endurance records during 1927, over six hours at 50 mph.
- 1929/1931 – Empire model 12, fitted with Villiers 147cc, 172cc and 247cc two-stroke engines with a three-speed Albion gearbox. There were two 147cc, two 172cc and one 247cc, the latter introduced in 1930 after further development. Colour: black with a black-and-white tank.
- 1930/1931 – Dominion Model 16 350 342cc J.A.P. four-stroke engine.
- 1930/1931 – Supersport Models 14, 15, 17, 18, Villiers 196cc MK 2E Supersport two-stroke engine.
- 1931/1936 – Black Hawk models 21, 29, 30, 36, 37, 196cc Villiers engine. Colour: black, with a black and white tank.
- 1931/1934 – Falcon models 22, 31, 38, 196cc Villiers engine.
- 1932/1933 – Merlin model 23, 147cc Villiers engine. Colour: black.
- 1932/1934 – Kestrel model 24, 147cc Villiers engine.
- 1932/1933 – Condor Sports model 26, Villiers 172cc Brooklands engine. Colour: black with silver and black tank. Rare model with only one or two thought to exist.
- 1933/1934 – Falcon TT 175cc Villiers. Colour: black with a silver tank.
- 1930/1935 – Lapwing models 25, 27, 28, 32, 33, 34, 35, 148cc and 196cc Villiers engine. A model 32T 148cc engine racer was made in small quantities. One was ridden by Tommy Meeten in the Scottish Six Day Trial in 1932. and won a silver medal. It was entirely in black. Generally, in black, with a black-and-silver tank.
- 1933/1940 – Cruiser models E32, 39, E39, F39, K39, J39, F45, G37, G45, 248cc MKIVA 14A Villiers engine, model 45 MK17A and 18A from 1939, four-speed Albion Hand-change Gearbox, colour black with brown saddle. The Cruiser model 45 had a foot gear-change from 1938.
- 1935/1941 – Plover models 40, F40, H40, K40, J40, 41, F41, J41, K41, G40, G41, 148cc Villiers Long-Stroke with three-speed gearbox, coloured black: The War Office tried several 148cc Plovers, but instead chose James and Royal Enfield, probably due to the bombing of Francis-Barnett's factory. Some Plover models are in wartime drab olive or dull brown.
- 1935/1940 – Seagull models 42, 43, F43, G43, H43, J43, K43, G47, H47, J47, K47, 248cc Villiers two-stroke with three-speed Albion gearbox. Colour: black or black with silver tank. The J47 was fitted with a four-speed Albion gearbox.
- 1935/1940 – Stag and Red Stag models F44, F46, G46, Blackburne 248cc four stroke overhead valve engine. The Red Stag was fitted with Dunlop tyres, narrow guards and a special finish – black with a silver and red tank and wheel rims. The Red Stag G46 is a rare machine produced from 1936 to 1938.
- 1939/1949 – Powerbike J50G pre-war, K50H post-war, Auto-cycle 98cc Junior Villiers engine, early models were unsprung, Junior Villiers Deluxe engine introduced in 1940 with sprung forks, ( a letter H after the frame number means that Harwii hubs instead of British are fitted), colour black with silver or maroon tank or all black, Deluxe in all green – Production stopped in 1940, resumed in 1945.
- 1949/1952 – Powerbike 56N, Auto-cycle 98cc MK 2F Villiers engine, introduced in June 1949. Withdrawn in 1952 as cycle motor attachments became popular.
- 1938/1940 – Snipe model K40, K41, K48, J49, Villiers 98cc and model K49, Villiers J48 122cc engine with three-speed gearbox. Colour: black. The Snipe was adapted for war use, and some were finished in wartime drab olive. Production stopped in 1940 after the factory was destroyed in the 1940 Blitz and was not resumed. The Merlin replaced it.
- 1946/1949 – Merlin model 51, L51 122cc 9D Villiers engine.
- 1947 – Light Cruiser 171cc AMC engine, red with white tank and mudguards.
- 1949/1953 – Falcon model 54, 55, 58, 60 Villiers 197cc 6E engine with rigid and spring frame. Noted for 20" long front fork springs, long silencer and foot brake. Colour: black, or optional Azure Blue. Some models are found modified for trials.
- 1950s – Starmaker 249cc competition model: Early 1950s Model 85 197cc 6E and 7E Villiers engines, later 249cc AMC engine, trials bike.
- 1946/1953 – Merlin models 52, 53, 57, 59, 61, 63, 122cc 10D Villiers engine with three-speed gearbox with rigid and spring frame. Colour: black.
- 1953/1955 – Falcon model 62T, 64T, 197cc 7E/8E Villiers engine. Colour: black. A rare machine. Ridden by Arthur Shutt to victory in the annual Scott Trial, Yorkshire 1953 and by George Fisher in 1955, finishing second.
- 1954/1955 – Falcon model 65, 67, 197cc 8E Villiers engine with four-speed gearbox. Came with knee grips on the petrol tank and lifting handles. Colour: black with chrome and gold-lined petrol tank finish; available in Azure Blue as an optional extra.
- 1954/1956 – Manufacturers Award Team Bikes ISDT 175cc and 197cc – Ridden by Ernie Smith, George Fisher and Dick Kemp. The 1955 International Six Days Trial (ISDT) was in Gottwaldov, Czechoslovakia. The 1956 ISDT was at Garmisch-Partenkirchen, West Germany.
- 1954/1957 – Cruiser models 68, 71, 75, 80, Villiers 224cc MK1H engine and four-speed gearbox with indicator and 12ch battery. Finished in Arden Green and chrome finish or Azure Blue with Arden Green saddle.
- 1954/1955 – Kestrel model 66, 13D, 32D Villiers 122cc 13D engine; produced in Azure Blue, chromium, and gold.
- 1955/1956 – Kestrel model 69, 147cc 30C Villiers engine; produced for one year in black.
- 1956/1959 – Plover models 73, 78, Villiers 147cc 30C and three-speed gearbox in Arden Green: The 1957 F-B 78 came with full weather equipment, "Home and Dry" usually in red with a black seat.

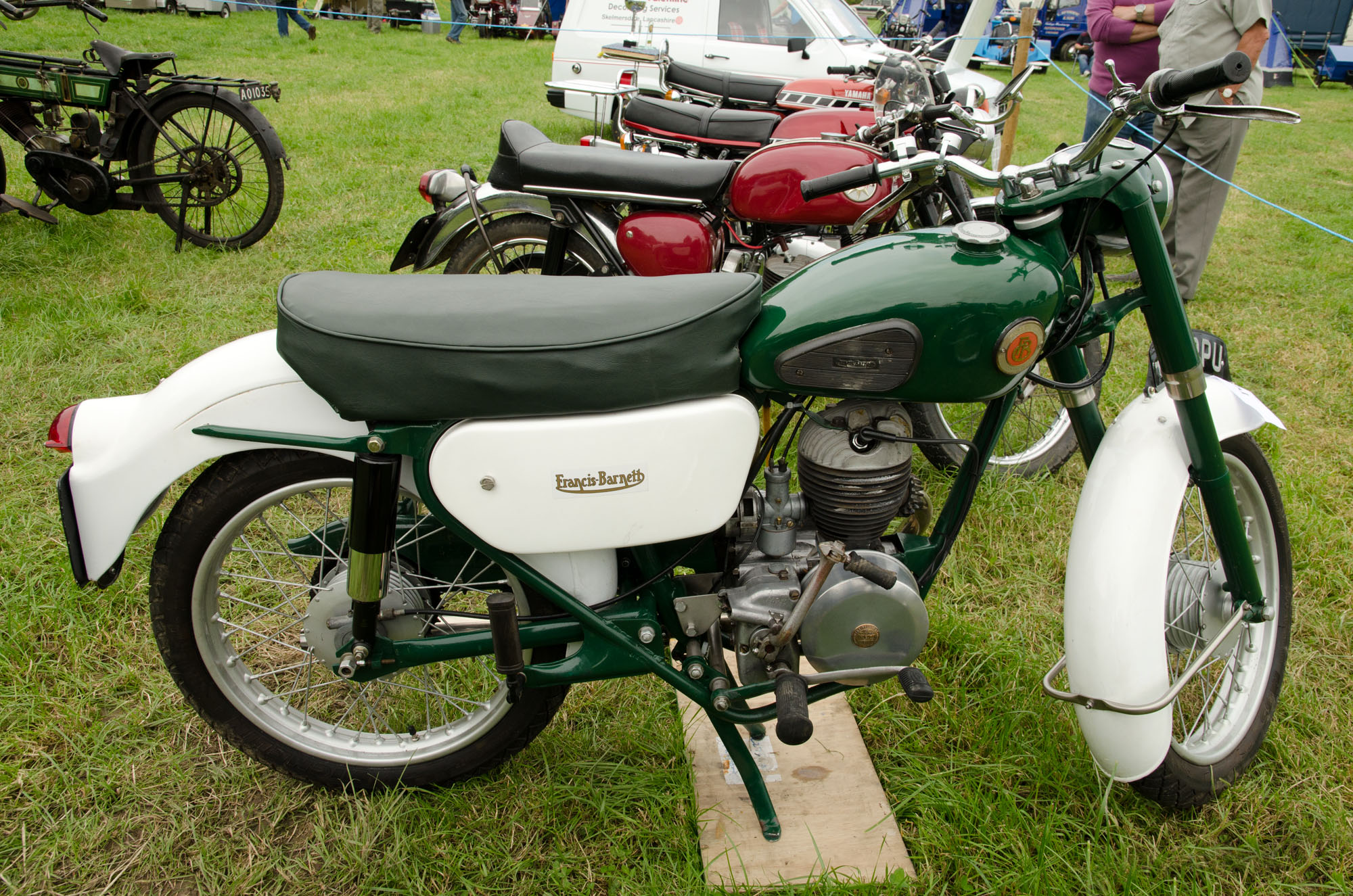
1959 Francis-Barnett 200cc Falcon Model 81

- 1954/1957 – Falcon models 70, 70C, 72, 74, 76, 77, 197cc 7E/8E Villiers engines. Colour: black, or later in Arden Green. Falcon 70 was displayed at Earls Court stand 103 in 1954, noted for the battery stored in the toolbox. Falcon models 70, 74, 76, 81 can be found with a reworking of the lower frame for trials.
- 1956/1957 – Falcon model 76T trials machine 197cc 7E Villiers engine with four-speed Albion gearbox, colour silver. This is a rare bike, as few survive.
- 1957/1963 – Cruiser model 80 with 249cc 25T AMC engine, colour Arden Green or red and white.
- 1958/1959 – Falcon model 81, with 197cc Villiers 10E engine.
- 1958/1961 – Light Cruiser model 79, 174cc 17T AMC engine with four-speed gearbox. Available in Arden Green; all black; Arden Green with white mudguards, or white with black frame.
- 1958/1959 – Falcon Scrambler model 82, 249cc 25T AMC engine or 246cc 32A Villiers engine. Colour: silver with a black seat. Ridden by scramblers John Compton, Bryan and Triss Sharp.
- 1958/1962 – Falcon models 83, 85, 87, 92, with AMC 199cc 20T engine and four-speed gearbox: Colour: Arden Green with Arden Green tank with silver striped motif, or black and white. These can be found with a lightweight alloy frame replacing the heavier steel frame, made by Whitton, Wright, Holland and Angus principally for trials. A Falcon 87 equipped as a police motorcycle was used in the ITV television series Heartbeat.
- 1959/1962 – Falcon trials model 83T, 85T, 249cc 25T Villiers engine. 1960 – 1965 Falcon model 87 199cc 20T AMC engine. Colour: black, with a white tank and silver mud guards.
- 1959/1962 – Cruiser model 84, 249cc 25T AMC engine. Colour: red and white, with a black seat.
- 1960/1962 – Plover model 86, 149cc 15T AMC engine: Colour Arden Green, with green and white tank.
- 1962/1965 – Cruiser model 89, with 249cc 2T and 4T twin cylinder Villiers engines. The 2T engine is reported to be smoother, with more torque, and the 4T engine has better performance and cooling provision. Colours: Arden Green with gold lines, or Arden Green and cream
- 1962/1966 – Fulmar Sports 88, 88T, 90, 90T, 149cc 15T AMC engine and four-speed gearbox. Noted for low centre of gravity due to engine-mounted position and reserve tank. The Fulmar 90T is a rare motorcycle used in six-day trials – thought to be only three left in the World. Fulmar 88T trials bike comes with a red frame, silver mudguards, tank and supports. The Fulmar 88 was produced in black, with a white fuel tank. Alternative colours were silver with a red tank and seat, or with a red frame and mudguards. Some had a white rear and a red front mudguard, and/or an alternative white cowling. Fulmar 90 is red and silver, or late models could be white with a red fuel tank cover.
- 1963/1966 – Cruiser Sports Twin model 91, Villiers 249cc 2T and 4T engine. Colour: red frame, silver mudguards and trim, with a red or red and silver tank. Late models were all red, with a black seat.
- 1963/1965 – Falcon trials model 92T, Villiers 246cc 32A engine. Colour: red with silver tank and mudguards.
- 1963/1965 – Fulmar Scrambler model 93, Villiers 246cc 32A engine
- 1964/1965 – Fulmar Scrambler model 94, Starmaker 247cc
- 1964/1966 – Plover models 95, 96, 149cc 15T AMC engine. The Model 95 was finished in Arden Green with a black and white tank. The model 96 was available in metallic green or with black mudguards.
- 1966/1967 – Plover TT Supersport 172cc engine; sold until 1967

== Bayonets ==
Francis & Barnett also made bayonets. The finish quality was not as high a standard as that of the Government factories. F&B bayonets were rare, with only a handful of known examples.

== Francis–Barnett cycles and motorcycles, 2015 onward ==
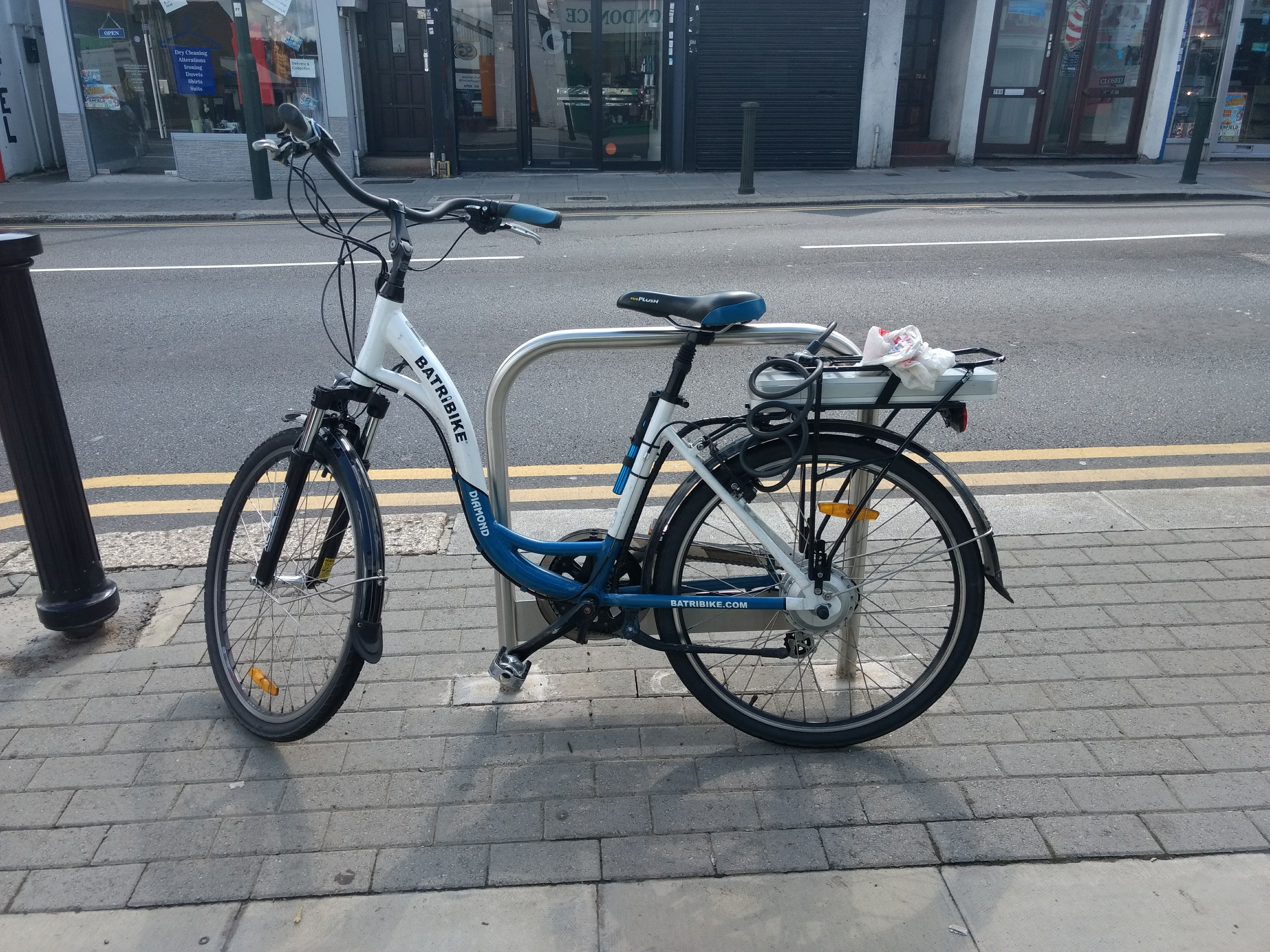
Batribike Diamond

A new company, Francis Barnett Coventry, formed in 2015, assembles powered bicycles and Chinese 125cc motorcycles in Kenilworth, a few miles south of Coventry. Models produced are the Batribike, Francis, Falcon four-stroke, Merlin, Kestrel, E-Dirt Bike, and Oset. The Kestrel and Merlin are based on the Classic 125, which is made by Herald Motor Company in China.
