= Saint Peris =

Welsh saint

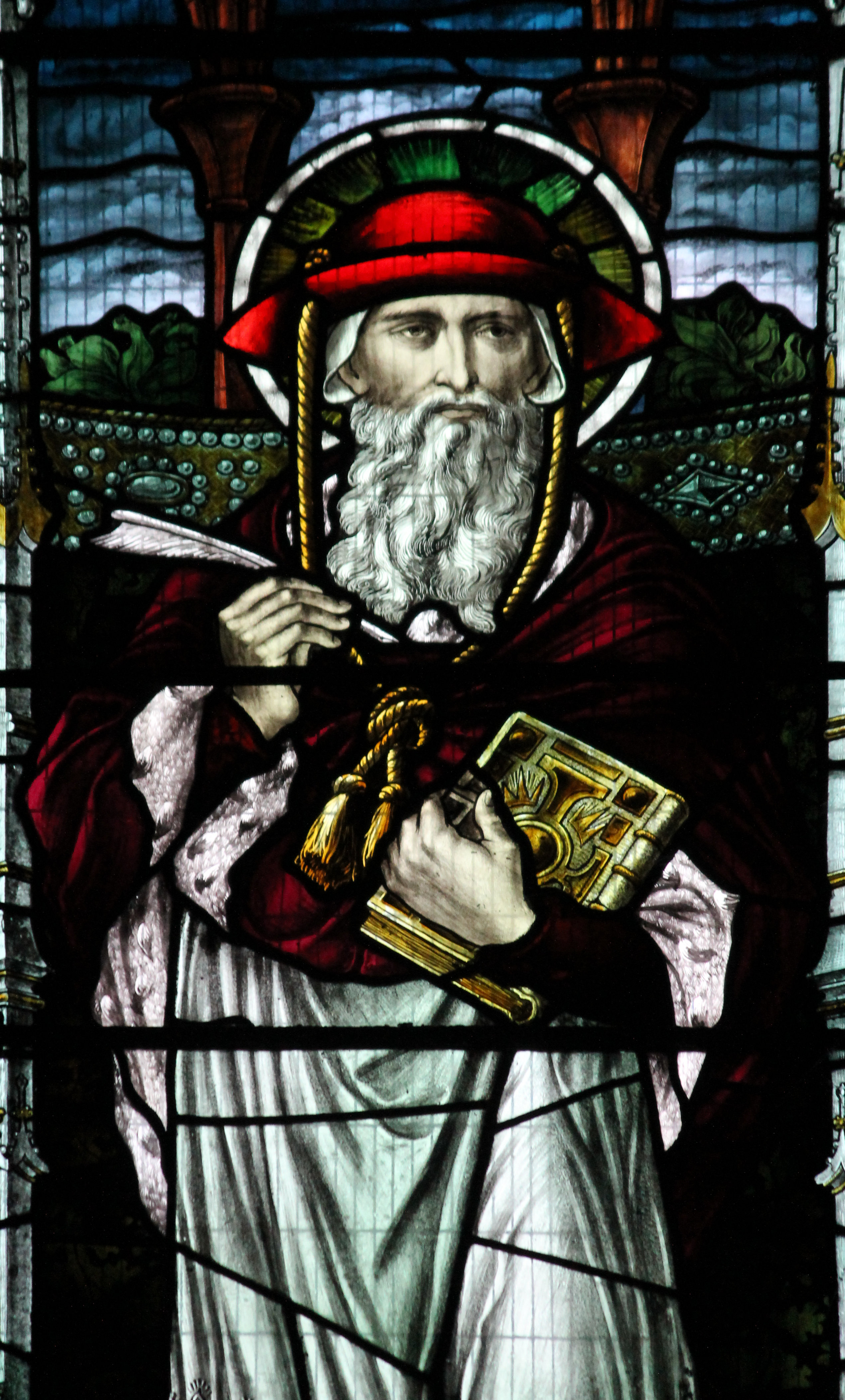
Llanberis Eglwys Sant Padarn – Church of St Padarn, Llanberis, Gwynedd.

Saint Peris was a little-known Welsh saint of the early Christian period, possibly 6th century.

He is referred to in the Bonedd y Saint as a 'Cardinal of Rome'. However, he may have been one of the many children of Helig ap Glannog of Tyno Helig. He is believed to have retired to the solitude of Nant Peris in North Wales, and the church in the village is dedicated to him.

Ffynnon Peris (or Ffynnon y Sant) is a well in Nant Peris named after the saint, who according to tradition, kept two fish there and drank from it daily. The nearby village of Llanberis is also named after Peris, as is Llyn Peris, a lake between Nant Peris and Llanberis.

His feast day is 11 December. Saint Peris is the patron saint of Llanberis.

== Saint Cian ==
Saint Cian was a soldier, who later became Perin's servant. He ended his life as a hermit in Caernarfonshire, Wales. The church in Llangian, Gwynedd, is dedicated to Saint Cían. His feast day also falls on 11 December.
