= Griffith Williams (Gutyn Peris) =

Welsh poet (1769–1838)

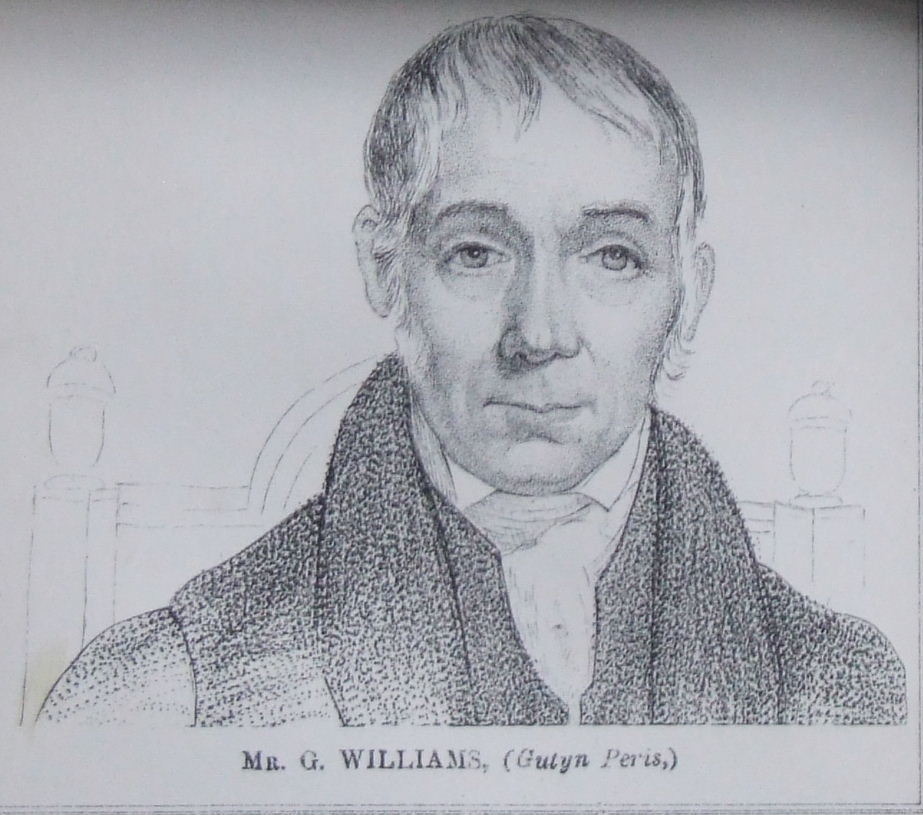
- Born: Griffith Williams; 2 February 1769; Hafod Oleu, Llanbeblig, Caernarfonshire
- Died: 21 June 1838 (aged 69); Llandygai
- Resting place: Llandygai
- Occupation: quarryman
- Spouse: Elizabeth
- Writing career
- Pen name: Guten Peris
- Language: Welsh
- Genre: Welsh Poetry
- Literary movement: eisteddfod revival

Griffith Williams (1769–1838) was a Welsh language poet. He chose Gutyn Peris as his Bardic name.

== Life ==
He was born as the only son of William Williams and his wife Catherine, daughter of Morgan Griffith, at Hafod Oleu in the parish of Llanbeblig, Caernarfonshire, on 2 February 1769. Not long after his birth the family moved to Llwyn Celyn, Llanberis. His father died soon afterwards, and when he had been at school for only a year, he was forced to seek employment as a farm hand.

After serving in various farms in Anglesey, he found work in 1790 at the Penrhyn Quarry, and for the next thirty years worked as a quarryman, holding foreman positions as he grew older. He married Elizabeth, daughter of Ellis Jones, on 21 June 1794, and after a few years moved to her home at Braich Talog, Llandygai, where he spent the rest of his life.

Griffith Williams died on 18 September 1838 and was buried at Llandygai.

== Works ==
As Gutyn Peris he won his first triumph as a bard in 1803, when the Gwyneddigion Society awarded him their medal for his ode to the memory of Goronwy Owen. In 1808 he composed for Lady Penrhyn a Welsh elegy on her husband Richard Pennant, 1st Baron Penrhyn. Two years later he won prizes at the St Asaph eisteddfod for an ode on the royal jubilee and another in memory of Queen Elizabeth. Some of his poems were printed by Dafydd Ddu Eryri in Corph y Gainc (1810), and in 1816 he self-published a volume of Welsh verse entitled Ffrwyth Awen. In 1811 he again won a prize, for an ode entitled Agriculture.

For the remainder of his life he was less successful: his ode on Belshazzar's Feast was second at Denbigh in 1828, although it was printed with the winner's in the Transactions of the eisteddfod (Chester, 1830). At Beaumaris in 1832 he took second place in the competition for the best ode on the Wreck of the Rothesay Castle.

According to J. E. LLoyd's assessment, "His knowledge of the Welsh metres was thorough, but he had few of the gifts of a poet."
