= Penllyn railway station =

Penllyn station, or Penllyn railway station, may refer to:

- Penllyn railway station (Wales), the northern terminus of the Llanberis Lake Railway in Wales, United Kingdom
- Penllyn station (SEPTA), a station on the SEPTA Doylestown Line in Pennsylvania, United States
