= Annie Foulkes =

Welsh writer and teacher (1877–1962)

Annie Foulkes (24 March 1877 – 12 November 1962) was a Welsh writer and teacher of French. Her poetry anthology, Telyn y dydd, became part of the curriculum in Welsh schools.

Born in 1877 in Llanberis, the daughter of a writer and official of Dinorwig slate quarry, she was educated at Dr Williams School in Dolgellau and later at the Collège de Jeunes Filles in Saumur, France (1896–97). She taught French after graduating, teaching at Tregaron County School from 1898 to 1905, and Barry County School from 1905 to 1918. In 1918, she succeeded Robert Silyn Roberts as Executive Secretary of the Appointments Board of the University of Wales.

Foulkes spent many years in Barry, Vale of Glamorgan, where she was an associate of Thomas Jones and his literary circle, and it was Thomas who convinced Foulkes to compile an anthology of modern Welsh poetry, which was first published in 1918 with the title Telyn y dydd. The anthology became a staple in the Welsh school curriculum and was published in many new editions. She also authored a travel book documenting her trip to the Pyrenees. She died, unmarried, in Caernarfon in 1962.
