= St Padarn's Church, Llanberis =

St Padarn’s Church, Llanberis
- Eglwys Sant Padarn
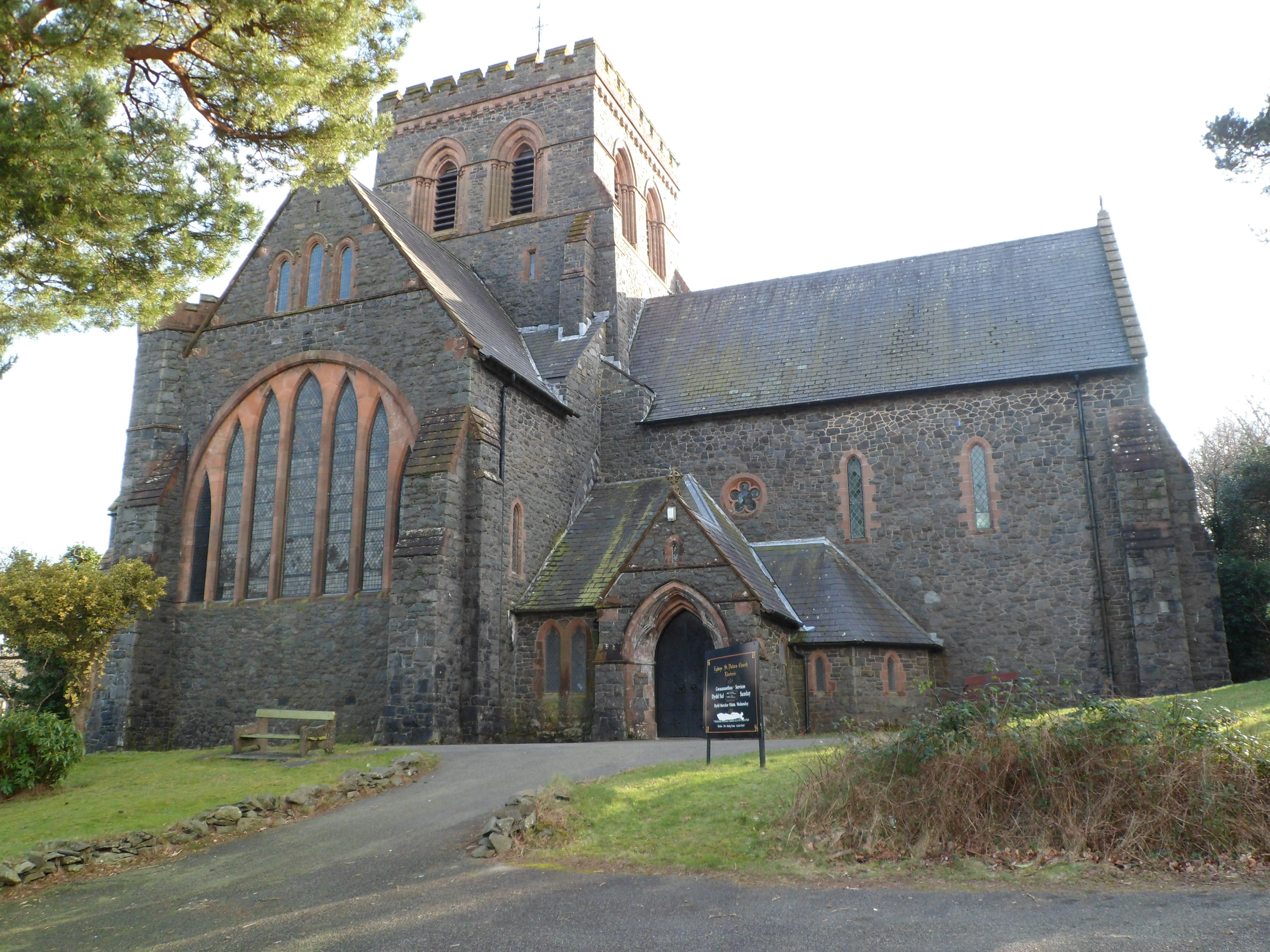
- St Padarn's Church
- St Padarn’s Church, Llanberis
- OS grid reference: SH 577600
- Location: Llanberis, Gwynedd
- Country: Wales
- Denomination: Church in Wales

History
- Status: Parish church
- Dedication: St Padarn
- Dedicated: 24 June 1885

Architecture
- Heritage designation: Grade II* listed building
- Designated: 28 May 1999
- Architect: Arthur Baker
- Years built: 1884–1885
- Construction cost: £5,455

Specifications
- Length: 120 feet (37 m)
- Height: 37 feet (11 m)

Administration
- Diocese: Diocese of Bangor
- Archdeaconry: Bangor
- Deanery: Synod Bangor
- Parish: Bro Eryri

Saint Padarn's Church, Llanberis is a parish church of the Church in Wales in Llanberis.

== History ==
The original church of St Peris was 4 kilometres (2.5 mi) to the south-east of Llanberis and as the town expanded a new church was required.

The foundation stone was laid on 3 January 1884 by Captain N.P. Stewart of Bryntirion.

The building was funded by the Assheton Smith family, which owned the rights to the slate quarried at nearby Dinorwig. It was designed by Arthur Baker of 14 Warwick Gardens, Kensington, London, a pupil of Sir George Gilbert Scott. The medieval font from St Peris was transferred here. The walls were built of local stone, with dressings of red stone from the quarries of Guest and Son, Runcorn. The construction cost was £5,455 (equivalent to £606,053 in 2025).

The building was dedicated on 24 June 1885.

Harold Hughes enlarged the church in 1914 with the addition of the Lady Chapel, on the church's north side, and the completion of the nave.

== Parish ==
The church is in the parish of Bro Eryri, which encompasses:

- Christ Church, Deiniolen
- St Deiniol's Church, Llanddeiniolen
- St Helen's Church, Penisarwaun
- St Michael's Church, Llanrug
- St Peris's Church, Nant Peris

== Organ ==
The church contains a two manual and pedal, 7-stop pipe organ dating from 1921 by J. W. Walker & Sons Ltd. A specification can be found on the National Pipe Organ Register.
