= Llanberis Lake Railway =

Narrow-gauge heritage railway in Gwynedd, Wales, United Kingdom

Llanberis Lake Railway Rheilffordd Llyn Padarn
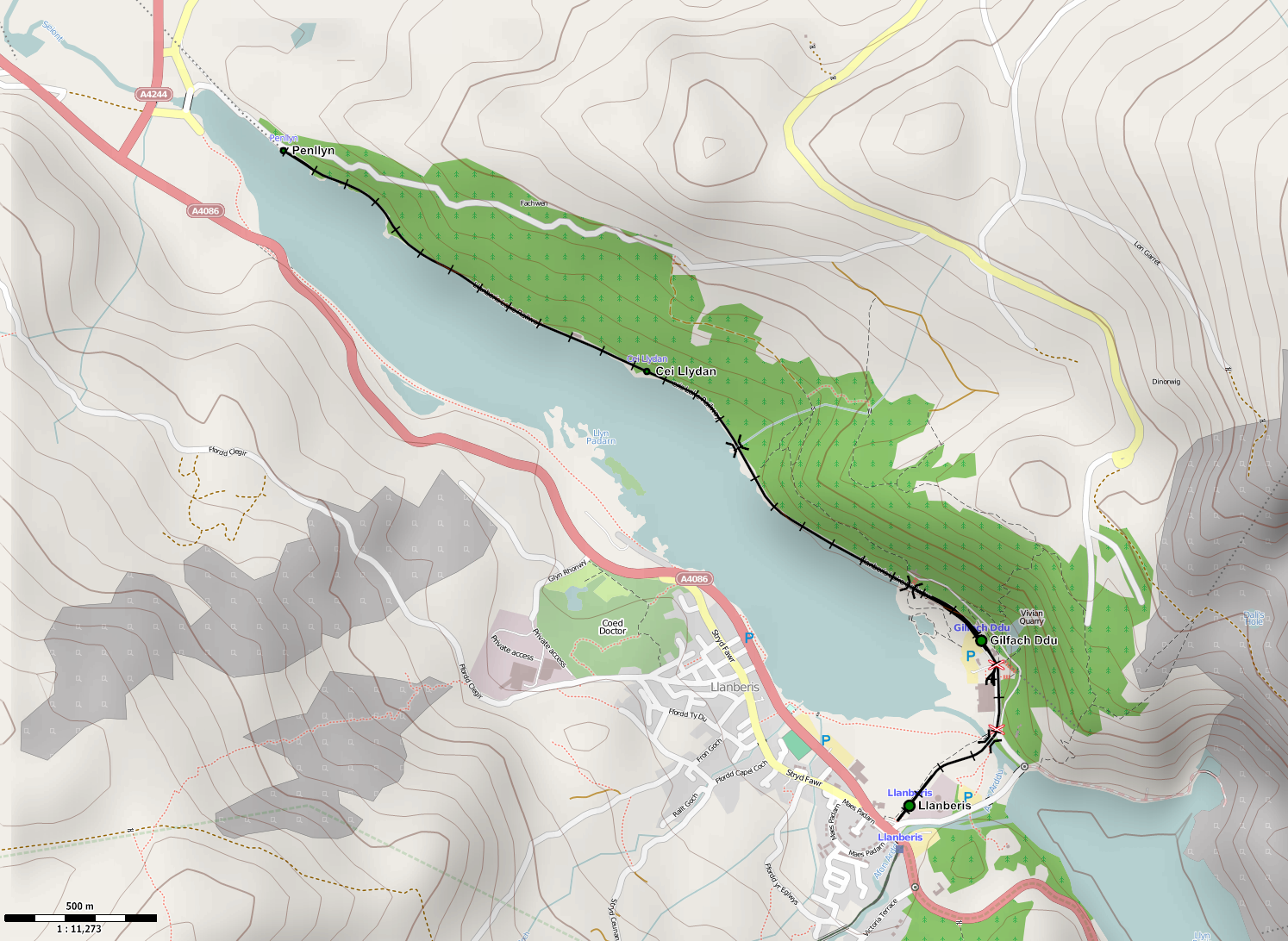

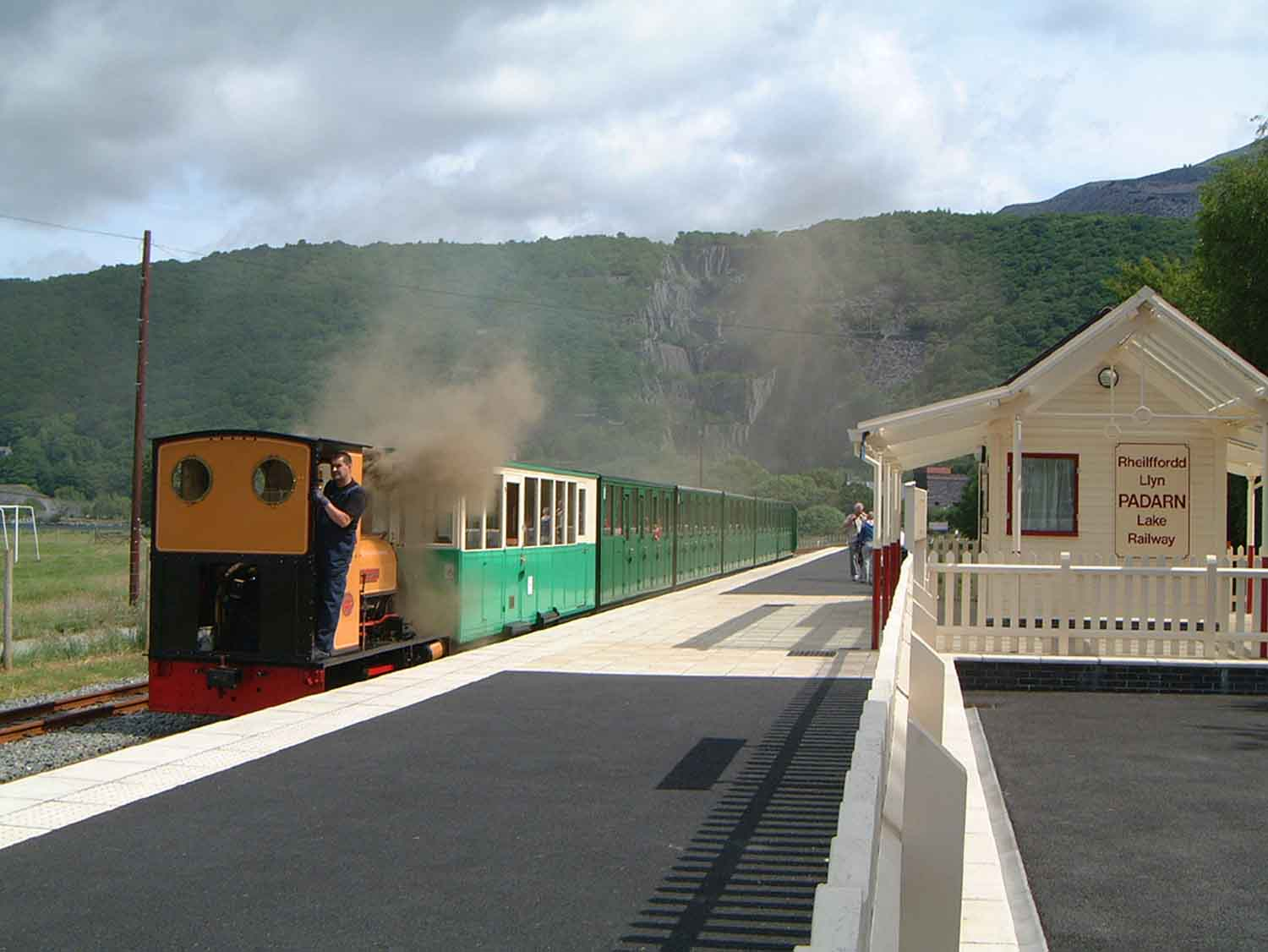
- The loco "Dolbadarn" pulls into Llanberis station which was opened in June 2003.

Overview
- Headquarters: Llanberis
- Locale: Wales
- Dates of operation: 1971–present

Technical
- Track gauge: 1 ft 11 1/2 in (597 mm)
- Length: 2.5 miles (4 km)

The Llanberis Lake Railway (Welsh: Rheilffordd Llyn Padarn) is a 1 ft 11 1/2 in (597 mm) narrow gauge heritage railway that runs for 2.5 miles (4 km) along the northern shore of Llyn Padarn in north Wales in the Snowdonia National Park. The starting point is the village of Llanberis at the eastern end of the lake (53.1175°N 4.1193°W), with the western terminus at Pen Llyn in the Padarn Country Park (53.1370°N 4.1495°W). The return journey takes around 60 minutes. The railway is one of the Great Little Trains of Wales.

== History ==
=== Early proposals ===
The Llanberis Lake Railway runs along part of the trackbed of the defunct Padarn Railway, a 4 ft (1,219 mm) gauge line which connected the quarry with Y Felinheli (Port Dinorwic) on the Menai Strait. The Padarn Railway closed in October 1961 and was lifted between 16 May 1962 and February 1963. Following the closure of the Padarn Railway, various plans were made to open a 2 ft (610 mm) gauge tourist railway on the trackbed. The first serious attempt was made by G. Ward, a local resident, who proposed a railway that would circle Llyn Padarn using the trackbeds of the British Rail Llanberis branch and the Padarn Railway. This plan would have utilized track and locomotives from the Dinorwic slate quarry, but the company did not pursue the proposal.

=== Quarry closure and formation of the railway company ===
In July 1966, A. Lowry Porter of Southend-on-Sea proposed a shorter railway running from the quarry company's workshops at Gilfach Ddu near Llanberis to Penllyn, along the easternmost three miles of Padarn Railway trackbed. Negotiations were progressing with the company, when in July 1969 the quarry closed at short notice. The quarry's workshops at Gilfach Ddu were purchased by the Gwynedd County Council with the intention of creating a Country Park.

The quarry's land and equipment were put up for auction, and Lowry Porter's fledgling railway company purchased three steam locomotives and one diesel locomotive for use on the planned lake railway. In June 1970 the County Council purchased the trackbed of the Padarn Railway and agreed to allow its use for the lake railway.

The Ruston diesel locomotive was quickly put into service laying track. Meanwhile, the first steam locomotive, Dolbadarn, was restored to working order. The new railway was built to 1 ft 11 1/2 in (597 mm) narrow gauge instead of the more unusual 1 ft 10 3/4 in (578 mm) narrow gauge used in the quarries. This required all the rolling stock to be regauged, including the locomotives. Tracklaying progressed during 1970 using track recovered from several sources, including some originally used on the Lynton and Barnstaple Railway.

New carriages were built using the chassis of bogie wagons. These initial efforts at creating passenger stock proved unsatisfactory – they had a tendency to derail due to their very rigid construction. This caused a delay in opening, and a subsequent rapid redesign of the carriages.

=== Early years ===
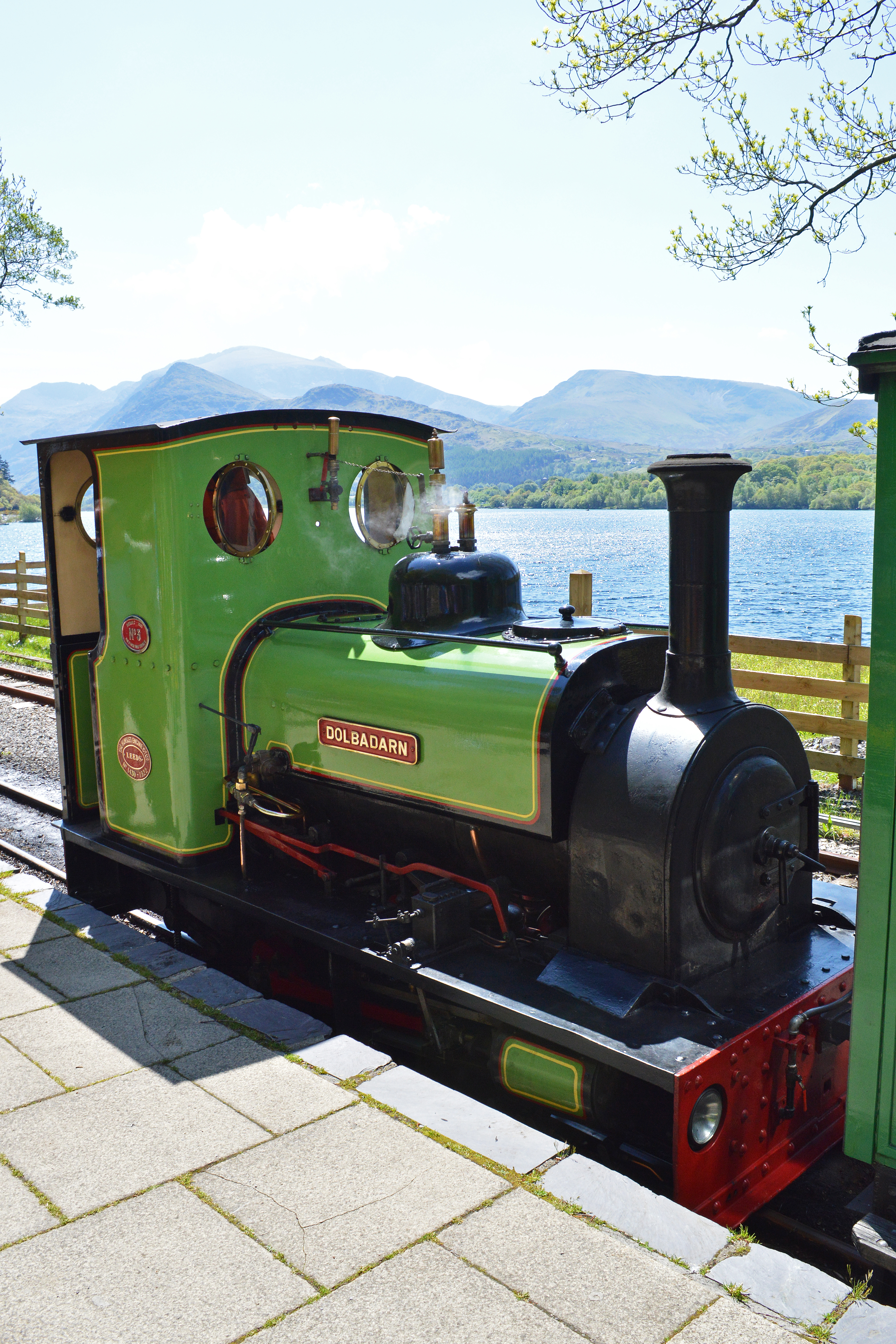
Dolbadarn beside the lake

The railway officially opened on 28 May 1971 but because of the need to redesign the carriage stock, the first public trains did not run until 19 July 1971. By the end of the first season, more than 30,000 passengers had been carried. In the winter of 1971 the railway was extended to its current terminus at Penllyn. For the beginning of the 1972 season, a second steam locomotive Red Damsel was returned to service with a new name: Elidir. The locomotive roster was expanded that year to include Maid Marian (now operating on the Bala Lake Railway) and an 0-4-0 tank locomotive built by Jung in Germany.

=== Llanberis extension ===
In June 2003 the railway was extended to the town of Llanberis, with a new station close to the start of the Snowdon Mountain Railway. The original terminus at Gilfach Ddu is now a through station serving both the National Slate Museum and the nearby Dolbadarn Castle. On the return journey from Pen Llyn, passengers may alight at Cei Llydan station, where a picnic site is available with views of the Snowdonian mountains above Llanberis Pass.

== Operations ==
The railway uses three steam locomotives ("Elidir", "Dolbadarn" and "Thomas Bach") all of which ran on the internal 1 ft 10 3/4 in (578 mm) gauge lines of the Dinorwic Quarry. There are also several diesel locomotives which are used for works trains and when the steam locomotives are unavailable for passenger trains.

When the Quarry closed down in 1969 the lakeside section of the trackbed was utilised for the current Llanberis Lake Railway, originally running from the National Slate Museum at Gilfach Ddu to Pen Llyn. Gilfach Ddu was the main engineering workshop of the Dinorwic Quarry and provided repair facilities for all of the steam locomotives of the quarry system.

== Locomotives ==
=== Current locomotives ===
Number	Name	Builder	Type	Works number	Date	Notes	Image
1	Elidir	Hunslet	0-4-0ST	493	1889	Built for the Dinorwic quarry; originally named Enid then later renamed Red Damsel Operational	
2	Thomas Bach	Hunslet	0-4-0ST	894	1904	Built for the Dinorwic quarry; originally named Wild Aster Operational (overhauled 2020)	
3	Dolbadarn	Hunslet	0-4-0ST	1430	1922	Built for the Dinorwic quarry Operational	
7	Topsy	Ruston Hornsby	4wDM	441427	1961	Built for Bestwood Colliery. Initially named Coed Gorau when it arrived at Llanberis.	
8	Twll Coed	Ruston Hornsby	4wDM	268878	1952	Worked at the Lodge Hill and Upnor Railway	
11	Garrett	Ruston Hornsby	4wDM	198286	1939		
19	Llanelli	Ruston Hornsby	4wDM	451901	1961		

=== Former locomotives ===
These are locomotives that ran on the Llanberis Lake Railway in the past, but have now moved to other locations.

Name	Builder	Type	Works number	Date	Notes	Image
Maid Marian	Hunslet	0-4-0ST	822	1903	Built for the Dinorwic quarry. Based on the Llanberis Lake Railway from 1972 to 1975. Subsequently, operating on the Bala Lake Railway	
Cyclops	Jung	0-4-0T	7509	1937	Based on the Llanberis Lake Railway from December 1971 to February 1980. Now renamed "Ginette Marie" and in storage at Strumpshaw Hall Steam Museum	
Helen Kathryn	Henschel	0-4-0T	28035	1948	Arrived at the Llanberis Lake Railway in 1975 from the Bala Lake Railway. It stayed until 1991, when it moved to the South Tynedale Railway	
No. 8	O&K	0-4-0WT	12722	1936	Used at various construction sites in northern Germany until 1957. Moved to the UK in 1970, where it ran on the Llanberis Lake Railway and then the Brecon Mountain Railway. Acquired by the Bredgar and Wormshill Light Railway in 1999.	
Charelfawr	Ruston Hornsby	4wDM	277265	1949	Purchased new for Dinorwic Quarry, it was purchased at the 1969 auction and assisted in the construction of the lake railway. In the 1971 (first) season it was used to shunt release passenger trains due to the lack of a run round loop at Gilfach Ddu. It was exchanged in 1975 for a 60HP Simplex from Alan Keef.	

=== Locomotives formerly on site ===
These are locomotives that were stored at the Llanberis Lake Railway in the past, that have now moved to other locations. They did not run on the LLR during their stay.

Name	Builder	Type	Works number	Date	Notes	Image
Diana	Kerr Stuart	0-4-0T	1158	1917	First ran on the Kerry Tramway, then moved to the Oakeley Quarry, then the Pen-yr-Orsedd Quarry. Stored in derelict condition on the Llanberis Lake Railway in the 1970s. Moved to the Brecon Mountain Railway in 1972. Restored to working condition in 2015, and in 2018 is based at the Amerton Railway	

== See also ==
- British narrow gauge railways
- Dinorwic Alice Class
