= Llanberis =

Village in North Wales

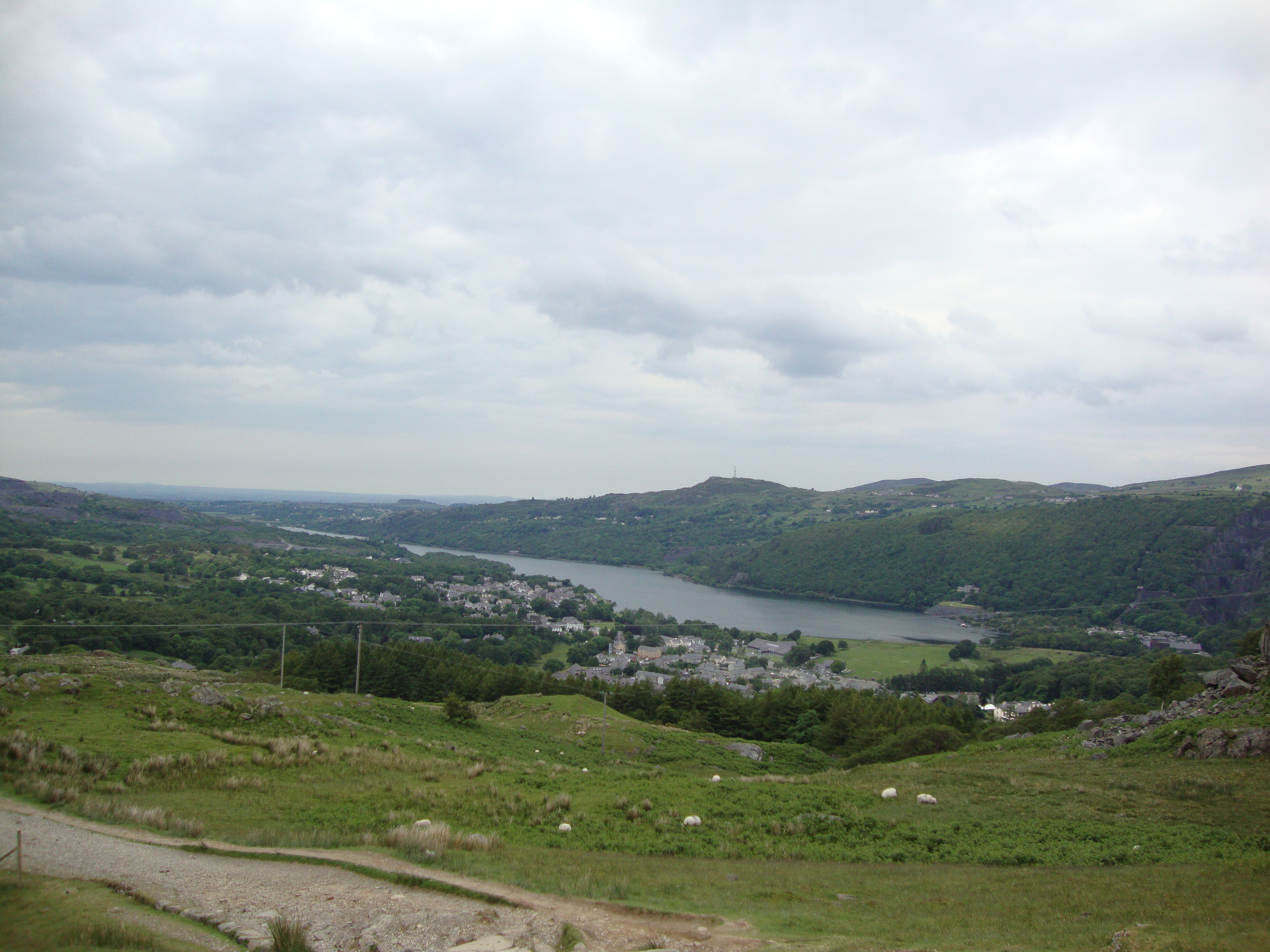
- Llanberis seen from the bottom of Llanberis Path at the base of Snowdon

- Location within Gwynedd
- Population: 2,026 (2011)
- OS grid reference: SH572602
- Community: Llanberis
- Principal area: Gwynedd
- Preserved county: Gwynedd
- Country: Wales
- Sovereign state: United Kingdom
- Post town: CAERNARFON
- Postcode district: LL55
- Dialling code: 01286
- Police: North Wales
- Fire: North Wales
- Ambulance: Welsh
- UK Parliament: Dwyfor Meirionnydd
- Senedd Cymru – Welsh Parliament: Gwynedd Maldwyn
- Website: cyngorllanberis.cymru/english/
- List of places UK Wales Gwynedd 53.119°N 4.131°W Map of the community

Llanberis (Welsh: [ɬanˈbɛrɪs]) is a village, community and electoral division in Gwynedd, northwest Wales, on the southern shore of Llyn Padarn and at the foot of Snowdon, the highest mountain in Wales. It is a centre for outdoor activities in Snowdonia, including walking, mountaineering, climbing, mountain biking and pony trekking, as well as water sports such as scuba diving.

The community includes Nant Peris or Old Llanberis, a hamlet about 2 miles (3 km) south-east of Llanberis, beyond Llyn Peris and at the foot of the Llanberis Pass which carries the A4086 through the mountains.

Llanberis takes its name from Saint Peris, an early Welsh saint. It is twinned with the Italian town of Morbegno in Lombardy.

== History ==
The ruins of Dolbadarn Castle, which were painted by Richard Wilson and J. M. W. Turner, stand above the village. The 13th-century fortress was built by Llywelyn the Great and is a Grade I listed building.

The Church of St Padarn is Grade II* listed, as is the chapel of Capel Coch.

In the 18th century Llanberis was the home of the legendary strongwoman Marged ferch Ifan.

== Demographics ==
The population of Llanberis in 2021 was 2,023.

=== Languages ===
According to the United Kingdom Census 2021, 69.5 per cent of all usual residents aged 3+ in Llanberis can speak Welsh. 79.6 per cent of the population noted that they could speak, read, write or understand Welsh. The 2011 census noted 74.7 per cent of all usual residents aged 3 years and older in the village could speak Welsh.

As of 2025, approximately 70 per cent of pupils in the village's primary school (Ysgol Dolbadarn) speak Welsh at home.

=== Country of birth ===
The 2021 Census noted that 96.6 per cent of Llanberis' population was born in the United Kingdom. The 2011 Census noted that 97.2 per cent of the population was born in the United Kingdom; 73.6 per cent of the population was born in Wales and 22.4 per cent of the population born in England.

=== Identity ===
According to the 2011 Census, 67.4 per cent of the population noted that they had Welsh-only national identity, with 26.1 per cent noting that they had no Welsh national identity at all. According to the 2021 Census, 64.8 per cent of the population noted that they had Welsh-only national identity.

== Local attractions ==
Places of interest in and near the village include the Snowdon Mountain Railway, the National Slate Museum, the Llanberis Lake Railway, Llyn Padarn country park and Electric Mountain. Tours of Dinorwig Power Station are also available from a purpose-built visitor centre.

The village is a common starting point for ascents of Snowdon along the Llanberis Path. Although it is the longest route, it is the least strenuous ascent, largely following the line of the Snowdon Mountain Railway. This makes it the most popular walking route on the mountain.

Dolbadarn Castle, a fortification built by the Welsh prince Llywelyn the Great during the early 13th century, stands near the base of the Llanberis Pass. The castle was important militarily and as a symbol of Llywelyn's power and authority. It features a large stone keep, which historian Richard Avent considers "the finest surviving example of a Welsh round tower". In 1284 Dolbadarn was taken by Edward I of England, who removed some of its timbers to build his new castle at Caernarfon. Dolbadarn was used as a manor house for some years, before falling into ruin. In the 18th and 19th century it was a popular destination for painters interested in Sublime and Picturesque landscapes. It is now owned by Cadw and managed as a tourist attraction, and is protected as a Grade I listed building.

Llanberis Mountain Rescue team deals with 150–200 incidents a year, as of 2013.

Llanberis Mountain Film Festival, held in annually in February, began in 2004. It was placed on hiatus in 2019 due to a lack of funding.

The area is the home of the Slateman Triathlon which runs in early summer each year. It attracts over 2,000 triathletes and many more spectators over two days. It is a mountain triathlon which begins in Llyn Padarn, follows on the bike up to Capel Curig, and finishes with a run in the Snowdonian mountains. Llanberis is also the start and finish of the Snowdonia Marathon.

== Transport ==
Bus services to Llanberis are provided by Arriva Buses Wales and Gwynfor Coaches. Former operator Padarn Bus, which went into receivership in 2014, was based in the town and ran several routes to it, including a number of open-top routes. Another local bus company, Express Motors, based in Penygroes, ran services to Llanberis but had its bus licence revoked in 2017.

The village used to be served by Llanberis railway station on a branch line of the Carnarvonshire Railway. Passenger services ceased in 1932; freight continued until closure in 1964. The heritage Snowdon Mountain Railway and Llanberis Lake Railway both have stations in the town, but serve primarily as tourist attractions rather than local transport links.

== Notable people ==
- Griffith Williams (1769–1838), bardic name Gutyn Peris, a Welsh language poet, brought up in Llanberis
- Annie Foulkes (1877–1962), writer and teacher of French
- Thomas Rowland Hughes (1903–1949), broadcaster, dramatist and poet
- Marc Lloyd Williams (born 1973) a footballer with 576 club caps and the Welsh Premier League's all-time top scorer with 319 goals; brought up in Llanberis
- Paddy O'Daire (1905–1981), Irish soldier and activist who fought in the Irish War of Independence, the Irish Civil War, the Spanish Civil War, and in World War II

== Gallery ==
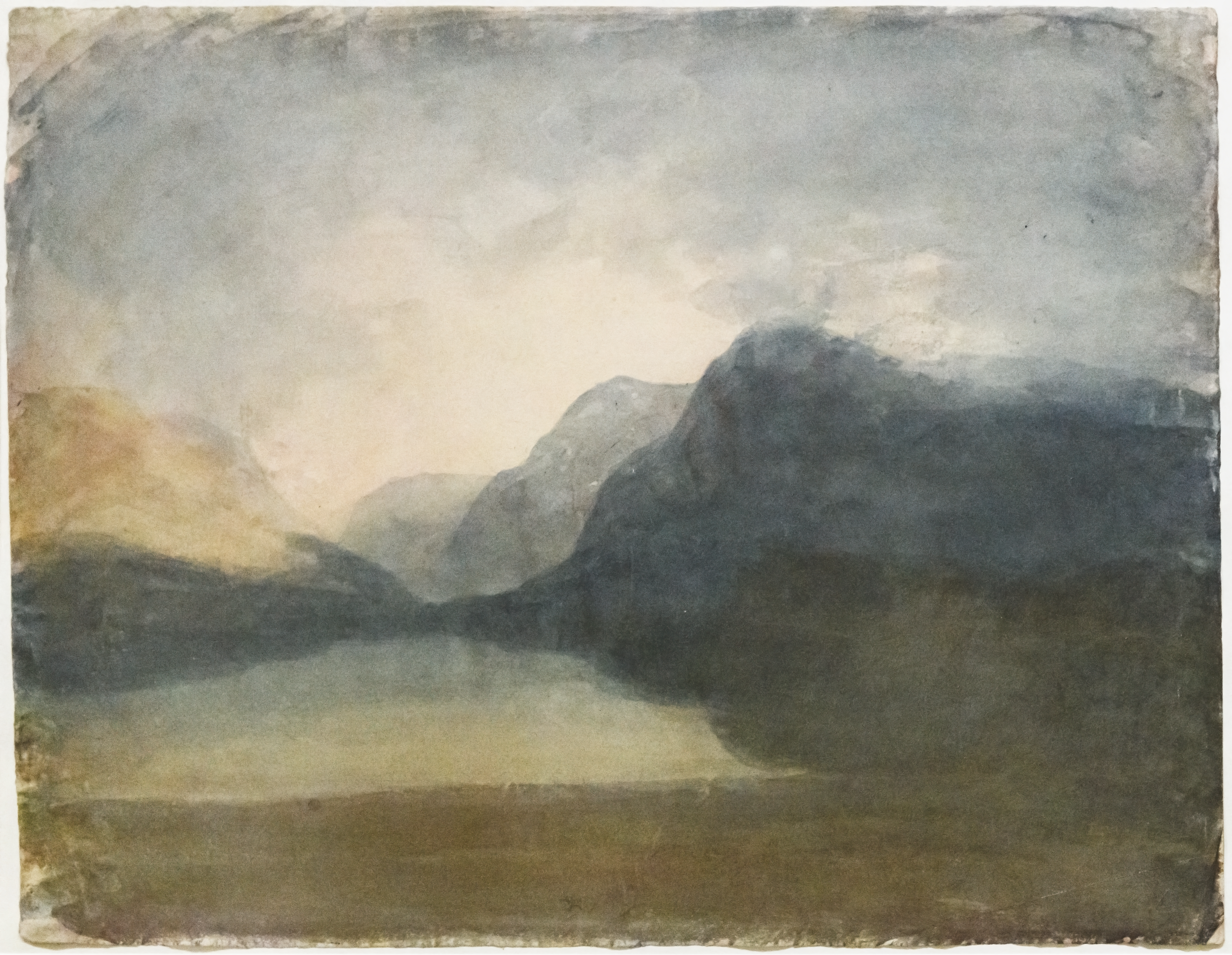
View across Llanberis Lake toward Snowdon c.1799-1800 – William Turner (Tate Britain)

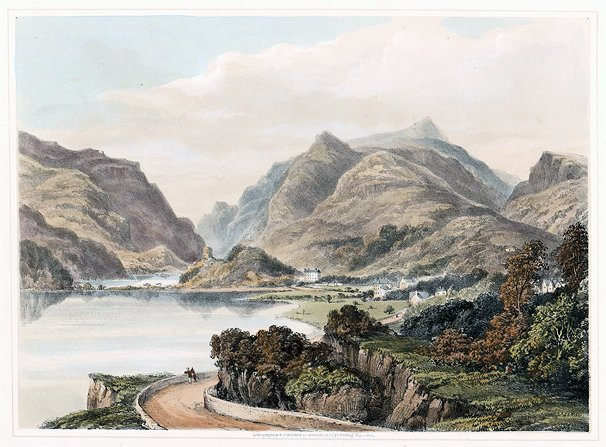
Llanberris, c. 1850

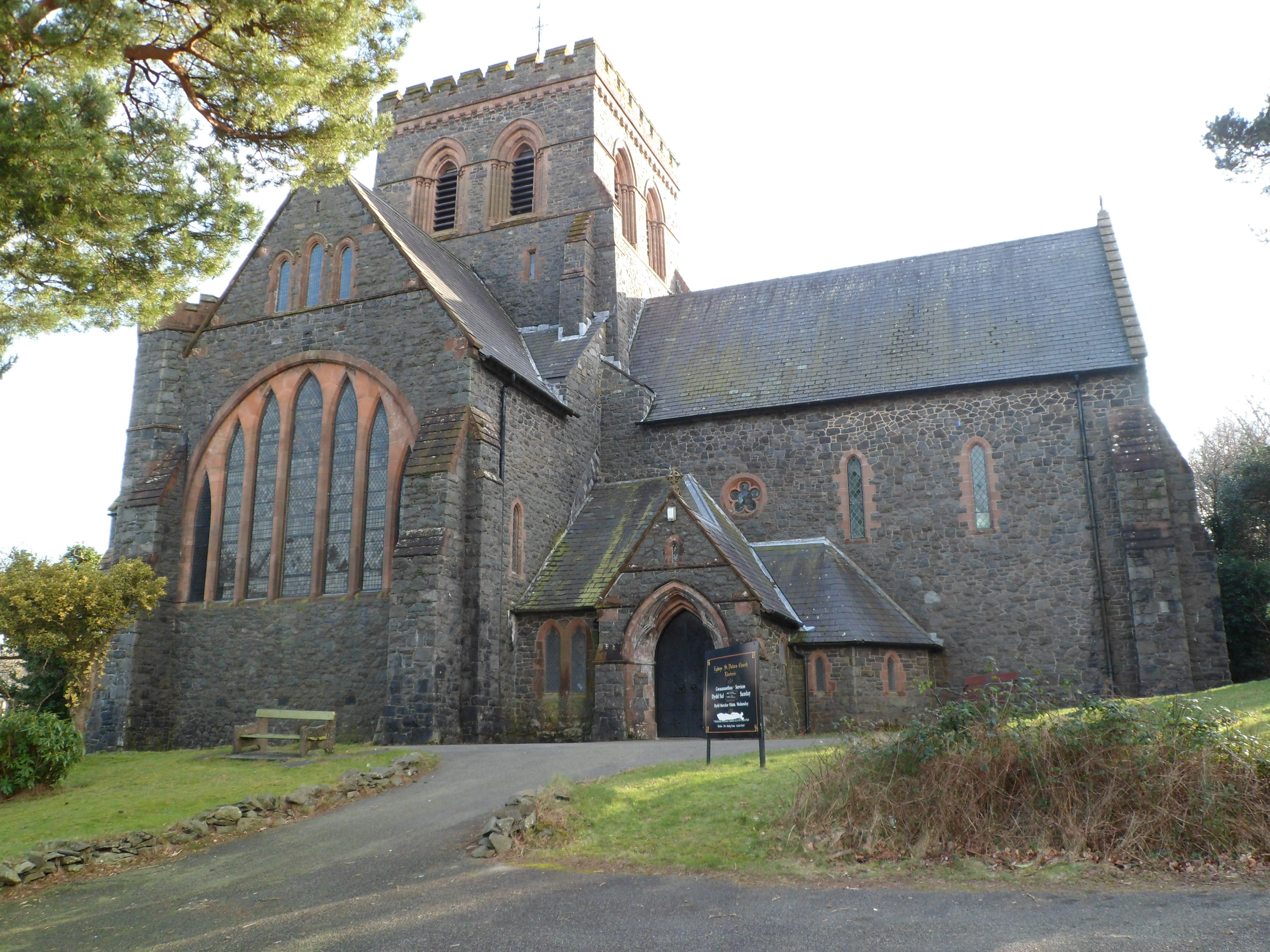
St Padarn's Church

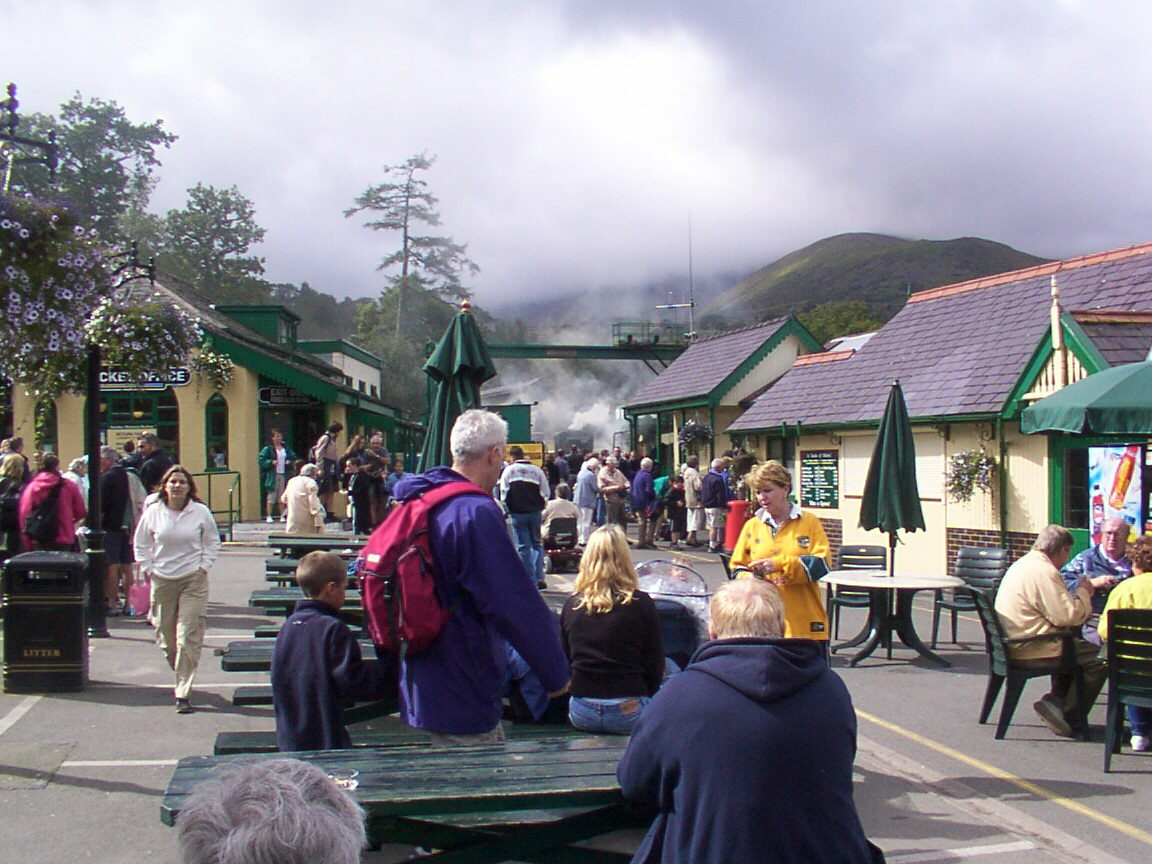
Llanberis Station forecourt
