= Llanddeiniolen =

Community in Gwynedd, Wales

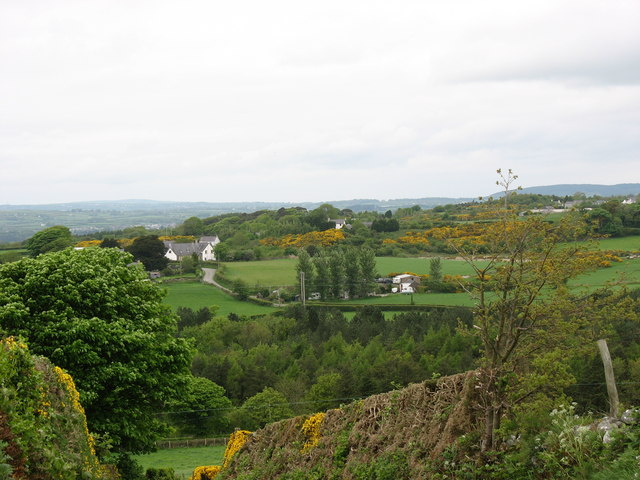
- Llanddeiniolen, from Pen Dinas Hill

- Location within Gwynedd
- Area: 41.03 km^{2} (15.84 sq mi)
- Population: 5,072
  - Density: 124/km^{2} (320/sq mi)
- OS grid reference: SH 5476 6627
  - Cardiff: 124.4 mi (200.2 km)
  - London: 206.0 mi (331.5 km)
- Community: Llanddeiniolen
- Principal area: Gwynedd
- Country: Wales
- Sovereign state: United Kingdom
- Post town: CAERNARFON
- Postcode district: LL55
- Post town: BANGOR
- Postcode district: LL57
- Police: North Wales
- Fire: North Wales
- Ambulance: Welsh
- List of places UK Wales Gwynedd 53.173698°N 4.17439°W Map of the community

Llanddeiniolen (Welsh: [ɬanðɛinɪˈɔlɛn]; Welsh pronunciation) is a community in the county of Gwynedd, Wales, and is 124 miles (200 km) from Cardiff and 206 miles (332 km) from London. It comprises the hamlet also called Llanddeiniolen, and the villages of Deiniolen, Bethel, Dinorwig, Rhiwlas, Brynrefail and Penisarwaun. It is the third-largest community by population in Gwynedd, with 5072 people in the 2011 census. Also in the community is the dispersed settlement of Fachwen, located on the north shore of Llyn Padarn. The name derives from the Welsh saint Deiniol, first bishop of Bangor (who died 572 or 584) or from his son, saint Deiniolen (also known as saint Deiniol Fab).

== Castell ==
Castell Llanddeiniolen, some 900m west of Rhiwlas, is a hill of glacial drift whose sides have been dug away to give a steeper slope. It has been identified as a Norman motte but is not a typical one. It may be a medieval ringwork – approximately, a motte and bailey without a motte – but may also be a small Iron Age fort.

== Dinas Dinorwig ==
Dinas Dinorwig, enclosing about a hectare of land, is the largest and best defended hillfort in Arfon. It is prominent in the landscape, overlooking a wide area. Its commanding position and the strength of its defences suggest that, until the Roman conquest, it was the outstanding centre of local power.

It lies on a low ridge some 1 km south-east of the hamlet centre and 3.5 km from the Menai Strait. It has an inner stone wall, surrounded by two massive ramparts of earth and rubble (an unusual construction method in north Wales), some 12 meters wide at the base and 9 meters high. The ditches are deep and the outer ditch is some 4 meters wide, with a counterscarp surrounded in turn by another ditch also some 4 meters wide. One entrance through the inner wall is blocked by the ramparts, so the inner wall is thought to have been the first phase of construction. There is one depressed area, interpreted as the site of a hut, within the wall. To the north the outer ramparts have been flattened to produce the platform on which Pen Dinas farmhouse now stands.

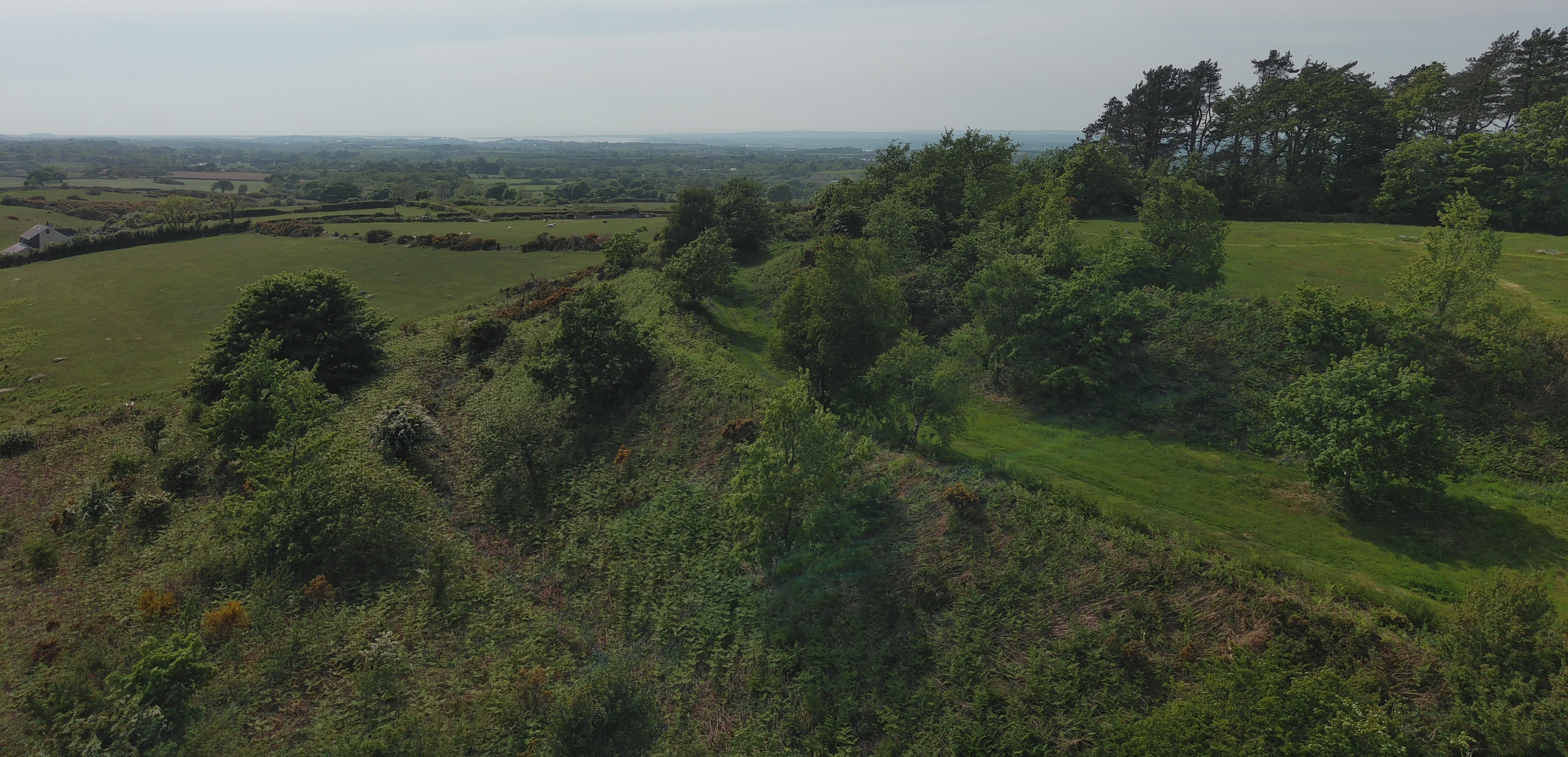
Western ramparts of Dinas Dinorwig hill fort from the SE

It is thought that it was part of the territory of the Ordovices tribe, and the element -orwig, -orweg has been derived from the tribal name Ordovices, so the name would mean Fort of the Ordovices. However this idea was rejected by the linguist Melville Richards for lack of an early record of a form *Orddwig.. (As "Dynorthveg" such a form is recorded in 1618.)

In 77 CE, at some unknown location in the territory of the Ordovices, the Roman governor Agricola led his troops up a hill to a decisive victory. He collected a force of veterans and a small body of auxiliaries; then as the Ordovices would not venture to descend into the plain, he put himself in front of the ranks to inspire all with the same courage against a common danger, and led his troops up a hill. The tribe was all but exterminated. He went on to conquer Anglesey, sending cavalry recruited in other parts of Britain swimming over the Menai Strait before the defenders of Anglesey were ready.

== See also ==
- List of localities in Wales by population
