= Dinorwig =

Village near Llanberis in Gwynedd, Wales

Coordinates: 53.135°N 4.114°W

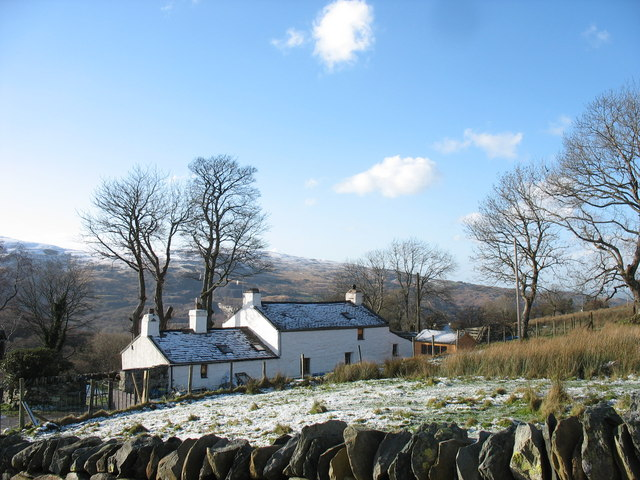
- Bwthyn Congl-y-mynydd Cottage, Dinorwig

- Location within Gwynedd
- OS grid reference: SH592616
- Community: Llanddeiniolen
- Principal area: Gwynedd
- Country: Wales
- Sovereign state: United Kingdom
- Post town: Caernarfon
- Postcode district: LL55
- Dialling code: 01286
- Police: North Wales
- Fire: North Wales
- Ambulance: Welsh
- UK Parliament: Dwyfor Meirionnydd
- Senedd Cymru – Welsh Parliament: Arfon

Dinorwig (/dɪˈnɔːrwɪɡ/ din-OR-wig; Welsh: [dɪˈnɔrwɪɡ]), historically spelled as Dinorwic in English, is a village located high above Llyn Padarn, near Llanberis, in Wales. The name is shared with the fort of Dinas Dinorwig, also within the community of Llanddeiniolen, on a foothill 6 kilometres (3.7 mi) from Dinorwig village and 3 kilometres (1.9 mi) from the Menai Strait and also with Port Dinorwic, the anglicised name of Y Felinheli. It lies around a mile from the larger settlement of Deiniolen.

== Etymology ==
It is thought that the village was part of the territory of the pre-Roman Ordovices tribe. From mediaeval times it has been part of the township, now the community, of Llanddeiniolen. The element -orwig, -orweg has been thought to derive from the tribal name Ordovices; this idea was rejected by linguist Melville Richards for lack of a sufficiently early record of a form *Orddwig..

== Facilities ==
Dinorwig is one of the main access points for Dinorwic quarry. It has a bus service to and from Caernarfon, with connecting services to and from Bangor at Deiniolen.

== History ==
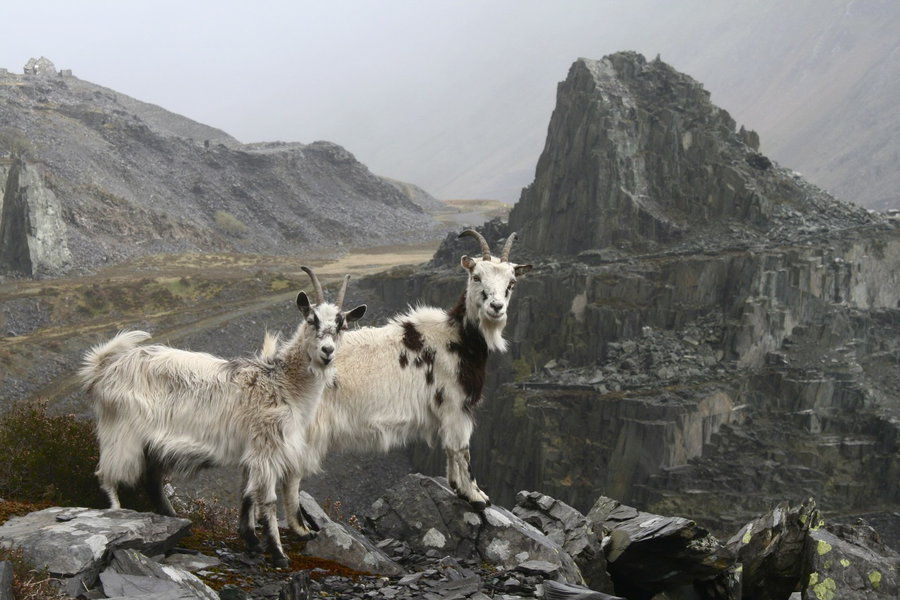
Feral mountain goats that are often seen wandering around the Dinorwig quarry

The village has a long history of slate quarrying. The Romans used local slate for the construction of Segontium, and slates from the valley were used in the construction of Caernarfon Castle. The main local quarry was the Dinorwic Quarry, which was worked from the late 1770s until 1969. After the First World War, cheaper alternative roofing materials became available and production at the quarry declined. This led to a decline in the fortune of the village itself and many moved away to nearby towns such as Bangor and Caernarfon.

Today, the village shares its name with a pumped storage hydroelectric power station, Dinorwig power station. The village is also the location of the Blue Peris Mountain Centre, a residential outdoor activities centre operated by Bedford Borough Council and Central Bedfordshire Council.

Part of the film Willow was shot in the disused Dinorwig Quarry, in June 1987.
