= Paul Griffiths (director) =

Welsh writer and director

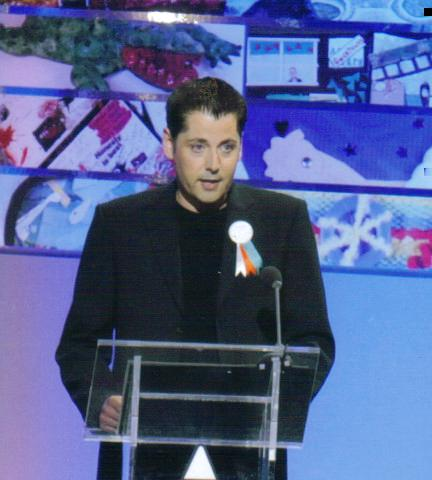
- Griffiths presenting the 2008 Drama Medal Ceremony at the Urdd Gobaith Cymru Eisteddfod in May 2008.
- Born: Richard Paul Griffiths; 8 August 1973 (age 53); Wales
- Education: University of Wales
- Occupations: Writer, director, critic
- Writing career
- Years active: 1994–present

Paul Griffiths (born 8 August 1973) is a Welsh writer, theatre critic and director. He won the Drama Medal at the National Urdd Gobaith Cymru Eisteddfod three times in succession between 1995 and 1997 – the only person ever to do this. Between March 2006 and December 2013 he contributed a controversial weekly theatre column to the National Paper of Wales Y Cymro. He is also a regular contributor on the Welsh language Television Channel S4C and BBC Radio Cymru.

== Early life ==
Griffiths was raised in Dolwyddelan, North Wales. At the age of thirteen, he set up his own theatre company, called Cwmni Ieuenctid Dolwyddelan. The company became successful and toured Wales competing in local theatre festivals. He was educated at Dolwyddelan school and later at Ysgol Dyffryn Conwy Secondary school in Llanrwst, North Wales. Griffiths took a three-year Media Course at the Y Coleg Normal, University of Wales, Bangor and after graduating in 1994, worked for numerous television companies as a Production Assistant, and later as an Assistant Producer and Director.

== National Urdd Eisteddfod ==
Griffiths won the Drama Medal at the National Urdd Gobaith Cymru Eisteddfod for the first time at the Preseli Eisteddfod in 1995 for a short play entitled O Gysgod y Cyll (From the Shadows). He repeated his success in 1996 at the Bro Maelor Eisteddfod in Wrexham with another short play called B'echdan? (Sandwich?) later adapted and televised on the S4C Digital as B'echdan Wŷ? (Egg Sandwich?). In 1997 he won again at the Islwyn Eisteddfod in Crosskeys with the play Ai am fod haul yn Machlud? (Is it because of the sunset?) which was also later adapted and televised on S4C Digital under the new name of Traeth Coch (Red Beach) starring Mali Harries. In 2000, at the Bro Conwy Eisteddfod held in Llandudno he was invited to adjudicate the competition and at the 2008 Eisteddfod, again held in Llandudno presented the Ceremony live on S4C. In 2010, Griffiths adjudicated the Drama Medal for the second time at the Ceredigion Urdd Eisteddfod. In May 2013, he was a TV studio guest for S4C during the Award Ceremony, celebrating 18 years since he won his first Medal, on the same Eisteddfod field.

== TV production career ==
Griffiths started his career in television production as a part of his work experience in his second year at Y Coleg Normal, University of Wales, Bangor, when he worked as a Runner on S4C's adaptation of the Saunders Lewis play Brad (Treason). After completing his Degree, he joined Eryri Films and worked on several drama series such as Tydi Coleg yn Gret (Isn't College Great) and I Dir Drygioni (Into the Evil Earth) and numerous light-entertainment series for S4C. In 1995, he spent a year working as an Assistant Film Editor on S4C's eight-part family drama series Lleifior. He joined Cwmni Da as a Researcher and later Assistant Producer in 1997, and contributed to BAFTA Cymru Award Winning series such as Y Sioe Gelf (The Arts Show), Popeth yn Gymraeg (Everything in Welsh) and Jones Jones Jones. In 2006, he filmed and directed a 30-minute documentary in the series Love Hurts for ITV1 Wales. He has also worked on co-productions for TG4, S4C and ITV1 Wales with Midas Productions, Dublin such as Frongoch – Coláiste na Réabhlóide (Frongoch – University of Revolution) and Celtic Monsters which won an Award at the Celtic Film and Television Festival in 2006. In June 2007, he left North Wales and re-located to London. Griffiths continues to work from time in Wales, and his last contribution was as Assistant Producer on the live six-day coverage for S4C of the Urdd Gobaith Cymru Eisteddfod from the Conwy Valley held in May 2008. He has previously worked on the 2006 and 2007 festival broadcast.

== Writing career ==
In 2000, Griffiths received several writing commissions from S4C including his first feature film commission. Two other scripts had also been turned into short dramas for the Welsh-language channel. He has worked on a number of scripts for S4C series like Pengelli and Tipyn o Stad (A Bit of a State) and wrote a 13-episode children's animation series called Bibi Bêl (Bibi the Ball) for Griffilms. His work is inspired by everyday life and gets his inspiration from listening to people talking and picking things up from conversations. In 2000, S4C's commissioning editor for drama, Angharad Jones, said Griffiths' scripts contained warmth and a sense of humour. "He also has quite a good understanding of female characters as he has got sensitivity", she added.

Following being diagnosed with depression in 2012, Griffiths was commissioned by BBC Radio Cymru to write a short radio play about his battle with the illness and attempted suicide. Dan y Don (Under the Wave) was broadcast in November 2013 and conveys a safe underwater haven that comforts sufferers of the illness, and echoes the poetical voices of Under Milk Wood by fellow Welshman, Dylan Thomas. In 2014, he completed a five-part comedy series for BBC Radio Cymru called Becca Bingo.

== Theatre career ==
After his Youth Company parted in 1994, Griffiths was invited to co-write, produce and direct a musical for a Festival to celebrate the centenary of poet and Archdruid Cynan in Pwllheli, Wales. In collaboration with musical director and Composer Annette Bryn Parry and author Glyn Roberts, Griffiths successfully produced O Docyn Brwyn i Ben Draw'r Byd (From 'Tocyn Brwyn' to the Ends of the Earth) at Neuadd Dwyfor Theatre, Pwllheli in May 1995, with a cast of over 50 local and professional artists including the Hogia'r Wyddfa and Rosalind and Myrddin. Following the success of the production, an annual May Festival was set up in the town, and Griffiths co-wrote and directed three further productions with the cast; Dan Hwyl Wen (Under a White Sail) in 1996 based on the sea-shanties of J. Glyn Davies, Dan Gysgod y Graig (In the Shadow of the Rock) in 1997 based on the true story of the Carreg yr Imbyll Granite Company, and Ail-Godi'r Llen (Raising the Curtain) in 2005, to celebrate the tenth anniversary of the company.

In 1998, Griffiths was commissioned along with composer Einion Dafydd to write a musical for the Urdd Gobaith Cymru Eisteddfod in Pwllheli, and Yn y Ffrâm (Framed) was produced at Neuadd Dwyfor, during the festival week in May 1998. A second commission followed in 2000, and Griffiths worked with composer Gareth Glyn on Ail-Liwio'r Byd which was staged at the Venue Cymru, Llandudno in May 2000.

Since re-locating to London in June 2007, Griffiths has worked with numerous companies such as Soho Theatre, Punchdrunk (theatre company), Battersea Arts Centre, Finborough Theatre, and five years as Operations Manager for the National Youth Music Theatre UK across the UK.

== Y Cymro ==
He longed that Wales could one day match the National Theatre of Scotland production standards.

In February 2010, Griffiths was interviewed on S4C's youth current affairs series Hacio.

== Youth Music Theatre UK ==
Between July 2008 and March 2012, Griffiths became Operations Manager for Youth Music Theatre: UK and managed their 2008 Summer productions which included Marie Jones' The Chosen Room at Belfast, Terry Pratchett' Mort at the Yvonne Arnaud Theatre, Guildford and Nick Stimson and Jimmy Jewell's production of Peter Pan at the Barbican, Plymouth. YMT's production of Conor Mitchell and Kath Burlinson's Missing Mel transferred to the Cochrane Theatre in the West End in October 2008.

Griffiths' Summer 2009 productions included A Winter's Tale by Howard Goodall and Nick Stimson at the Yvonne Arnaud Theatre, Guildford, Loserville: The Musical by James Bourne and Elliot Davis directed by Steven Dexter at the South Hill Park Arts Centre in Bracknell with Mamma Mia! Musical Director Martin Lowe and second year developments of Marie Jones' The Chosen Room in Belfast and Peter Pan at the Aberdeen International Youth Festival. YMT also commissioned four new musicals called Fool's Gold and According to Brian Haw...? at the Barbican, Plymouth, The Watchers at the Bradford Playhouse and Eight at Casterton in Cumbria. In December 2009, Peter Pan transferred to the Bridewell Theatre, London for a short pre-Christmas run.

In February 2010, Griffiths appeared on S4C's early evening TV show 'Wedi 7' to promote YMT's 2010 Cardiff Auditions.

YMT's 2010 Summer productions, which Griffiths oversaw, included further development of Nick Stimson and Jimmy Jewell's Peter Pan alongside their new interpretation of John Gay's The Beggar's Opera at South Hill Park Arts Centre in Bracknell with Choreographer David Leighton. Other projects included Jenifer Toksvig's adaptation of David Almond's children's novel, The Savage in Casterton, Cumbria; Scheherazade at the Bradford Playhouse; A Song for Eurydice at the Barbican Plymouth and a sequel to the 2009 production of the vampire musical The Watchers called Ghosts of the Past at the Aberdeen International Youth Festival. Conor Mitchell's The Dummy Tree originally commissioned by the National Theatre's Connections Festival and presented by YMT members in 2009, ran for 2 weeks at London's Tristan Bates Theatre.

2011 saw further developments of Terry Pratchett' Mort, a new musical version of Shakespeare's Macbeth and Out There by James Bourne and Elliot Davis directed by Steven Dexter who gave YMT Loserville: The Musical in 2009. YMT's 2011 flagship show was Korczak based on the life and work of Janusz Korczak at the Rose Theatre, Kingston. YMT also visited the Aberdeen International Youth Festival with a new show by Kath Burlinson called Tales of the World's End and two shows in Plymouth, Love and Madness and Jabberwocky based on an adaptation of Jabberwocky.

In August 2011, Griffiths and the Korczak company were featured on S4C's 'Wedi 7' to promote the show. He resigned from the charity in March 2012, due to illness.
