= Clwt-y-bont =

Coordinates: 53.14503°N 4.13287°W

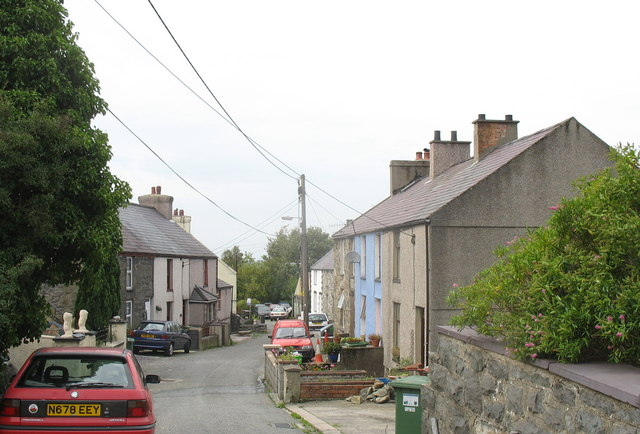
- Caledffrwd Terrace, Clwt y Bont

- Location within Gwynedd
- OS grid reference: SH574630
- Community: Llanddeiniolen
- Principal area: Gwynedd
- Preserved county: Gwynedd
- Country: Wales
- Sovereign state: United Kingdom
- Post town: CAERNARFON
- Postcode district: LL55
- Dialling code: 01286
- Police: North Wales
- Fire: North Wales
- Ambulance: Welsh
- UK Parliament: Dwyfor Meirionnydd
- Senedd Cymru – Welsh Parliament: Gwynedd Maldwyn

Clwt-y-bont is a village in Gwynedd, Wales, lying just to the south of Deiniolen. The two villages form one urban unit. Both were built in the early 19th century to house workers in the Dinorwig slate quarry, and both suffered when the quarry was closed in 1969.

== Foundation ==
The Welsh word clwt means "patch" and bont means "bridge".

Both Clwt y bont and Deiniolen were built in the early 19th century to house workers in the Dinorwig slate quarry. Houses include single houses and terraces from the 1830s. Clwt y Bont seems relatively unplanned, and has the short terraces built into the slope typical of early Gwynedd industrial settlement. The plan was dictated by the line of the 1825 Dinorwic Railway.

== History ==
After the 1860s, few new buildings were erected until social housing was built in the 1940s. In 1870, the village was part of the parish of Llanddeiniolen. Most of the inhabitants were employed by the Dinorwig-slate quarries. The novelist Ann Harriet Hughes (1852–1910) married a doctor in Clwt-y-bont, where she lived for a period. The large Pentre Helen Housing Estate was built in the late 1930s, and linked Deiniolen and Clwt y Bont into one village. The economy suffered badly when the Dinorwic Quarry was closed in 1969.

The locations of some of the mills are still visible, and some of the larger ones are still in use as workshops. There are limited shops and other facilities in the village. The Libanus chapel, and its sister chapel Sardis, are affiliated to the Baptist Union of Wales and are under the pastoral care of the minister of Capel Penuel in Bangor. There are many sites for boulder climbers on the hillside between the Fachwen road and Clwt y Bont.

== Sources ==
- "Clwt y Bont", Gwynedd Housing
- Deiniolen and Clwt y Bont, Gwynedd Archaeological Trust, 100017916, 2005, archived from the original on 7 April 2016
- Glossary of Welsh origins of place names in Britain: C, Ordnance Survey
- Jones, Eric (23 December 2006), "Capel Sardis – the highest chapel in Wales", geograph.org
- Jones, Eric (17 February 2007), Looking across Ffridd Gel towards the Pentre Helen Estate, archived from the original on 4 April 2016
- "Schoolboy Error, Schoolboy Traverse", North Wales Bouldering, 20 June 2015
- Williams, Richard Bryn (1959), "HUGHES, ANNIE HARRIET", Dictionary of Welsh Biography, National Library of Wales
- Wilson, John Marius (1870–72), "Llanddeiniolen", Imperial Gazetteer of England and Wales
