= Ordovices =

Celtic tribe in Great Britain

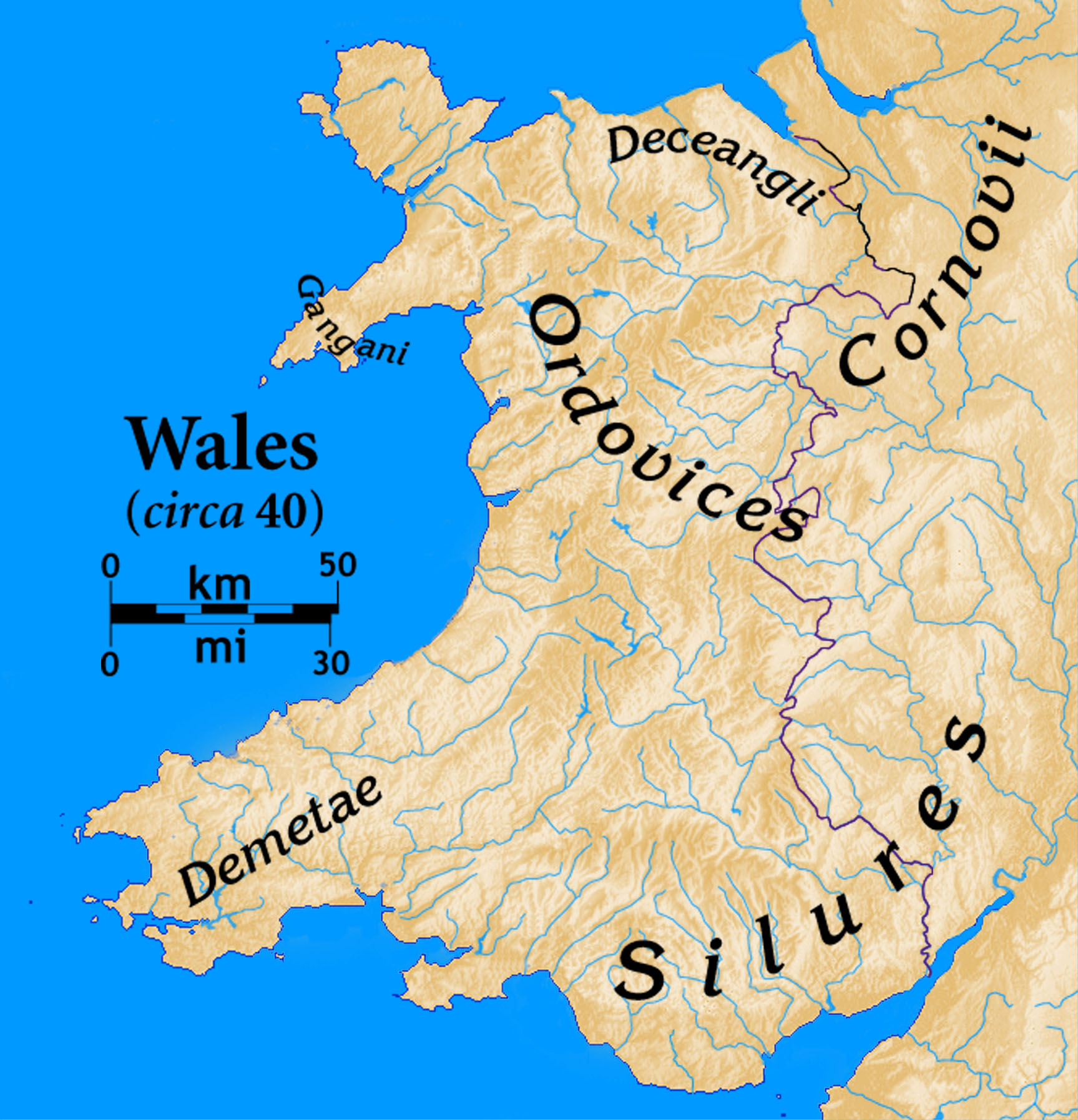
Tribes of Wales at the time of the Roman invasion. The modern Anglo-Welsh border is also shown, for reference purposes.

The Ordovices (from Latin: Ordovīcēs; Common Brittonic: *Ordowīces) were one of the Celtic tribes living in Great Britain before the Roman invasion. Their tribal lands were located in present-day North Wales and England, between the Silures to the south and the Deceangli to the north-east. Unlike the latter tribes that appear to have acquiesced to Roman rule with little resistance, the Ordovices fiercely resisted the Romans. They were eventually subjugated by the Roman governor Gnaeus Julius Agricola in the campaign of 77–78CE when the Romans overran their final strongholds on Anglesey.

== Etymology ==
The Celtic name *ordo-wik- hammer fighters, cognate with the proto-celtic words for 'hammer': Irish: ord, Welsh: gordd (with a prothetic g-) and Breton: horzh (with a prothetic h-) and "fight": Old Irish: fichid- (cf. Lemovices, Eburovices), middle Welsh: gwyth. John Edward Lloyd suggested that the name of this tribe is preserved as the element -orwig, -orweg in the place name Dinas Dinorwig ("Fort of the Ordovices") in North Wales, though Melville Richards rejected the idea. It is transliterated to Ancient Greek as Ὀρδούικες in Ptolemy.

=== Geology ===
In 1879 the pioneering English geologist Charles Lapworth named the Ordovician geological period after the Ordovices because the rocks he was studying were found in the tribe's former territories in North Wales.

== Territory ==
South of the Brigantes, the geographer Ptolemy reported three tribes whose territories stretched from the Irish Sea to the North Sea. The Ordovices occupied the westward lands and had two noteworthy cities, Branogenium which was located 195 Roman miles from London, most likely at Leintwardine, and Mediolanum which was located 200 Roman miles from London. Neither has been conclusively located. The boundaries of the tribal territory are also unknown; they have been taken to extend through modern Powys into what is now the English Midlands, or alternatively to be limited to the land north of the rivers Dyfi and Dee.

== History ==
They were among the British tribes that resisted the Roman invasion. The initial resistance was mainly organised by the Celtic leader Caratacus, exiled in their lands after the defeat of his tribe in the Battle of the Medway. Caratacus became a warlord of the Ordovices and neighbouring Silures, and was declared a Roman public enemy in the 50s AD. In Caratacus' last battle, governor Publius Ostorius Scapula defeated Caratacus and sent him to Rome as a prisoner.

In the 70s, the Ordovices rebelled against Roman occupation and destroyed a cavalry squadron. This act of war provoked a strong response from governor Agricola. According to Tacitus, "He collected a force of veterans and a small body of auxiliaries; then as the Ordovices would not venture to descend into the plain, he put himself in front of the ranks to inspire all with the same courage against a common danger, and led his troops up a hill. The tribe was all but exterminated." Agricola went on rapidly to conquer Anglesey. The location of this battle is unknown but the hill-fort Dinas Dinorwig encloses a hectare of land about 3 km from the Menai Strait.

== See also ==
- List of Celtic tribes
- Prehistoric Wales
