= Hogia'r Wyddfa =

Welsh five-piece band

- Hogia'r Wyddfa in Snowdonia (Eryri) in 1974

Background information
- Origin: Llanberis, Wales
- Genres: Welsh folk music, light music
- Years active: 1963–2013
- Labels: Dryw, Sain
- Past members: Arwel Jones; Elwyn Jones; Myrddin Owen; Vivian Williams; Richard Morris; Annette Bryn Parri

Hogia’r Wyddfa were a Welsh five-piece vocal group with a career in Welsh-language entertainment that lasted fifty years. One of the best-selling Welsh-language groups of the 1970s, they were awarded a gold disc for their 1975 album Caneuon Gorau.

== Career ==
The group formed in 1963 as a trio comprising Arwel Jones, Elwyn Jones and Myrddin Owen. They initially performed under the name Triawd yr Wyddfa (the Snowdon Trio) and gave their first concert to a group of young mothers in their native Llanberis. They became a quintet with the addition of guitarist Vivian Williams and piano accompanist Richard Morris.

The group were influenced by Triawd y Coleg, admiring the vocal trio's preference for original material rather than imitating English-language music. They adapted poems for some of their material, with Arwel Jones commenting in 2011 "we didn't want to sing covers of English or American songs – the poems of R. Williams Parry and Cynan said much more about us as boys from Llanberis." The group initially received criticism for their practice of adapting poetry, but their songs were later credited with popularising the works they were based on. In later years, contemporary Welsh poets wrote lyrics for the group. Their performances took a light entertainment format, with comedy routines interspersed by songs. Actor John Ogwen has credited the group's following to their use of "the wit and culture of the slate quarry workers. The humour has a certain edge but it’s also warm-hearted."

Hogia'r Wyddfa's recording career began in 1968 with the first in a series of EP recordings for Dryw. By the end of the decade, the group's recordings and appearances on television and at Eisteddfodau had made them household names in Wales. In 1971, Hogia'r Wyddfa toured the United States and Canada as part of 48-strong entourage. They performed with Parti'r Ffynnon in Ohio, New York, Michigan and Ontario. By 1972, they were described as "the leading Welsh folk group" by the North Wales Weekly News. In 2017, Myrddin Owen commented "I don’t think there’s a village in Wales where we didn’t perform at least once, the amount of time we spent travelling and performing is almost frightening." In 1973, the group performed at the Royal Albert Hall, an appearance they considered the pinnacle of their career.

They recorded their self-titled first album with Sain in 1974. Alongside tenor Trebor Edwards, they became one of Sain's best-selling acts. In November 1990, Dafydd Iwan presented the group with gold discs for selling more than 10,000 copies of their second Sain album Caneuon Gorau (1975). With Edwards, soprano Marian Roberts and Cerdd Dant exponent Rosalind Owen, the group again toured the United States and Canada in 1984. After the death of Richard Morris, Hogia'r Wyddfa searched for a successor and selected Annette Bryn Parri, who began touring with them in 1992. The band continued to perform concerts in the 1990s and released Rhaid i Ni Ddathlu, their first album in over a decade, in 2001.

The group celebrated their 50th anniversary in 2013 with a concert at the National Eisteddfod of Wales in Bala. The concert, televised on S4C, followed the announcement that they would retire.

Elwyn Jones died in 2017 aged 79.
