= Huw Robert Jones =

Welsh politician

Huw Robert Jones (3 March 1894 – 17 March 1930), known as H. R. Jones, was a Welsh nationalist politician.

Jones was born in Ebenezer in Caernarfonshire, where he worked in the quarries from the age of thirteen, and later as a travelling grocery salesman. He led a campaign to rename his home village as "Deiniolen", which was successful. Always a strong proponent of home rule for Wales, in 1924 he founded the Welsh Home Rule Army and, as one of its three most prominent leaders, he attended the founding meeting of Plaid Cymru. Saunders Lewis referred to Jones as the only Welsh nationalist who "would have received a post from Michael Collins".

Plaid was founded in a hotel in Pwllheli, while the National Eisteddfod was underway. Jones was chosen as its first general secretary, but the other party founders convinced him to avoid non-violent direct action in their cause. In 1928, he stood for election to the county council in Upper Deiniolen, the party's only candidate, but he was not elected.

Although popular with party members, he was not regarded as an effective organiser. He contracted tuberculosis and in 1928, he became aware that he did not have long to live. He was compelled to scale back his role until his death in 1930.

After Jones' death, Gwenallt composed "Breuddwyd y Bardd" in his honour.

Party political offices
| Preceded by New position | General Secretary of Plaid Cymru; 1925–1930 | Succeeded by John Edward Jones |
