= Tipyn o Stad =

Welsh TV series (2001–2008)

- Written by: Gwenno Hughes, Geraint Jones
- Country of origin: Wales
- Original language: Welsh
- No. of seasons: 7

Production
- Producers: Norman Williams, Pauline Williams
- Production companies: Tonfedd Eryri, Cwmni Da

Original release
- Network: S4C
- Release: 5 March 2002 – 14 September 2008

Tipyn o Stad was a television drama series on S4C at the beginning of the 2000s that was produced by Tonfedd Eryri and Cwmni Da. It follows the Gurkha family, with Wyn Bowen Harries and Gwenno Elis Hodgkins portraying the heads of the family.

== Story ==
The series was set on a fictional council housing estate called Maes Menai in Caernarfon. It follows the Gurkha family and their neighbours.

== Production ==
The show was on S4C. There were 7 series, ending in 2008. It was filmed in a number of locations around Caernarfon.

Its first episode was broadcast on 5 March 2002. The last episode was shown on 14 September 2008.

The production company was Tonfedd Eryri, which merged with Cymni Da in 2005.

The producers were Norman Williams, and Pauline Williams, who also worked as a scriptwriter. Gwenno Hughes and Geraint Jones were responsible for the story, as well as scriptwriting. Others on the scriptwriting team included Mirain Llwyd Owen, Paul Griffiths, Dwynwen Berry, William Jones, Luned Emyr and Llinos Snelson. It was commissioned for television by Angharad Jones.

=== Cast ===
- Wyn Bowen Harries as Charlie Gurkha
- Gwenno Hodgkins as Carys Gurkha
- Jennifer Jones as Heather Gurkha
- Russell Jones as Laurence 'Stud' Williams
- Siwan Llynor as Cheryl Gurkha
- Neil Williams as Neil Gurkha
- Dewi Snelson as Iwan Lewis
- Huw Marshall as Tony Evans
- Eleri Robinson as Linda
- Rhodri Meilir as Keith
- Jennifer Vaughan as Heather
- Tudur Roberts as Jimbo
- Mari Emlyn as Haf

== Revival as Stad ==
Tipyn o Stad experienced a revival of interest when it was added to the streaming service S4C Clic in 2020 and was watched more than 240,000 times. The characters of the series were resurrected in 2022 for the new drama series Stad on S4C, produced by Cwmni Da and Triongl and written by Angharad Elen. A second series of Stad, filmed around Caernarfon and Bangor, was aired in 2025. It was written by Angharad Elen and Dafydd Palfrey and starred Lowri Palfrey, Siôn Eifion, Gwenno Fôn, Begw Rowlands, Gwenno Hodgkins, Wyn Bowen Harris and Elen Gwynne.
