= Ysgol Dyffryn Conwy =

Location
- Nebo Road; Llanrwst, Conwy, LL26 0AP; Wales
- Coordinates: 53°08′21″N 3°47′33″W

Information
- Mottoes: Gyda'n gilydd allwn gyrraedd ein potensial Together we will achieve our potential Nec Timet Nec Tumet; We neither fear nor boast
- Local authority: Conwy
- Department for Education URN: 401686 Tables
- Headteacher: Elan Davies (2014–2020); Owain Gethin Davies (2020–present)
- Gender: Co-educational
- Age: 11 to 18
- Enrolment: 521 (Year 7-11); 137 (Year 12-13)
- Language: Welsh (As of 2025)
- Colours: Maroon and Black
- Website: ysgoldyffrynconwy.org (in Welsh and English)

Ysgol Dyffryn Conwy is a Welsh-medium co-educational comprehensive school in the town of Llanrwst in Conwy County Borough, North Wales. The school serves the community of Llanrwst and the many surrounding villages including the rural districts of Betws-y-Coed, Dolgarrog and Cerrigydrudion. There are around 658 pupils on roll, including 137 in the sixth form, which is lower than the figures at the time of the last inspection in 2014. Most of them are bilingual. The school has recently been moved onto one expanded site which had originally housed years 7-9 only. The site of the upper school (the oldest building and site of the original grammar school) has been developed into an NHS centre.

The headteacher of the school from 2014–2020 was Elan Davies, the first female headteacher of the school in 400 years.

The school was founded as Llanrwst Grammar School in 1610 by Sir John Wynn, which was situated in the building of the 'upper school'. In 1960 it was renamed Ysgol Dyffryn Conwy (Conwy Valley School) to reflect the fact that the school served the wider Conwy Valley. In February 2005 the pupils were all moved to the Sodexo-owned site on Nebo Road.

== Examinations ==
The school offers education for KS3, KS4 and Post-16 students. It offers GCSE, Entry Level examinations for KS4 and AS-level and A-level for Post-16 education. It is a Welsh Joint Education Committee accredited centre for presenting records of national achievement, using the WJEC as an examination board. This school was the first in Conwy to give Year 10 pupils a chance to get a qualification in Physical Education, without taking up the GCSE.

== Notable former pupils ==
- Kai Owen
- Glyn Wise
- Paul Griffiths
- Russell E. Morris
- Nesta Wyn Ellis

== Dyffryn Conwy Eisteddfod ==
The Dyffryn Conwy Eisteddfod has been held annually at the school on the third Saturday of June, since 1980.
