= Parciau hill fort =

Roman period hill fort on Anglesey

- Bryn Ddiôl
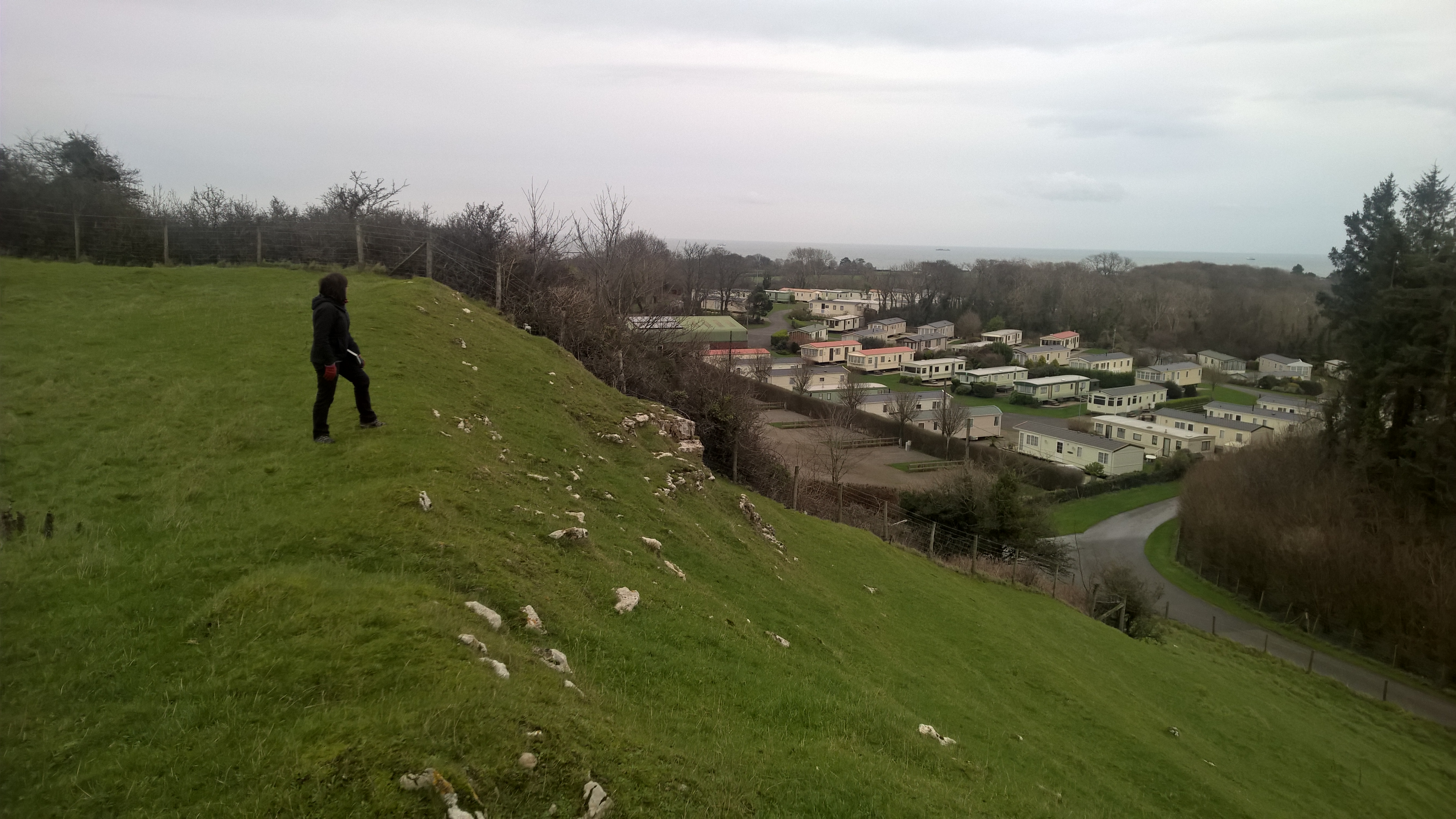
- Parciau hill fort on Bryn Ddiôl
- Interactive map of Parciau hill fort
- 53.337464°N 4.262375°W
- Type: hill fort
- Periods: Roman
- Location: Anglesey, Wales
- Region: Great Britain

Site notes
- Material: stone
- Length: 110 m (360 ft)
- Width: 80 m (260 ft)
- Management: private
- Public access: No
- Scheduled Ancient Monument

Parciau hill fort is a hill fort on the Welsh island of Anglesey. It stands on the summit of Bryn Ddiôl, whose name means "trackless hill".

== The site ==
Bryn Ddiôl is a plateau some 95 metres above sea level, the eastern termination of an outcrop of Carboniferous limestone. On three sides it is surrounded by natural cliffs and steep slopes (and, in 2016, by extensive modern caravan sites, Parciau farmstead, and other buildings). It is some 2 km from beaches on the northwest coast of the island, commanding extensive sea views beyond them. To the west the ground offers a gentle slope for access, and here the tip of the outcrop is cut off by at least one outer wall, through which the entry point is still visible. The base of a small gate-house adjoins the entrance. The wall continues around the outcrop, defining a protected area some 110 by 80 metres.

== Aerial photography ==
Aerial photography has revealed, within the fort, parch marks of the stone bases of about 28 hut circles, tightly packed together, each some 7.5-8.2 metres across. It is officially protected as Scheduled Ancient Monument AN041.

== Pre-Roman flint ==
One piece of flint debitage was found, in the spoil from a trench dug for a waterpipe.

== Roman period and later ==
No finds have been attributed to the pre-Roman Iron Age. Prichard's excavations in 1867 found that the floor of one of the circles contained marine shells, bones of domestic animals, charcoal, and pottery of white, light gray, black, and brick-red fabrics, with one "specimen of what is usually denominated Samian". Two larger pieces of bone had possible tally marks. Six minute beads of coloured glass, and tiny fragments of bronze, were also found, and a piece of flint.

In 1923, Edward Neil Baynes excavated small areas on the site. He found a small group of Roman coins, of Valerian (253–260), Victorinus (269-271) Claudius Gothicus (268-270), Carausius (286–293), and Crispus Caesar (died 326). He also uncovered bone from horses and other domestic animals, and artifacts including fragments of Roman domestic black ware and of ollae, one piece of Roman glass, an iron nail, a small bowl of red sandstone 16 inches by 12 inches, and a dressed stone 12 inches long by 4 inches square.

Baynes also found some probable fragments of box tiles, suggesting that a house heated by a hypocaust stood close by. Prichard reported that 'well constructed walls', one encasing a human skeleton, had been found during the extension of Parciau farmhouse, southwest of the fort, and this may possibly represent a prosperous Roman building. However, these walls were attributed by Prichard's informants to John Bodvel, a famous inhabitant of the 1600s, and a date more recent than Roman may be likely.

== Extramural traces ==
Immediately west of the fort, on the gentle slope of Bryn Ddiôl, aerial photography has shown traces of earthworks (a track way and platforms), extending some 280m from the fort. These have not been excavated. Parciau farmstead lies immediately south of these traces; in 2011 earth working was undertaken to improve the farm buildings, and this work was monitored by Gwynedd Archaeological Trust. However, the area concerned showed no upstanding features of archaeological interest, and mechanical earth stripping showed only the foundations of the preceding structure, with various recent service trenches and access tracks. No archaeology was identified within the remaining undisturbed areas of the site.

== Summary interpretation ==
Waddington interprets these finds as suggesting that an Iron Age hillfort was abandoned about the time of the Roman conquest of Anglesey, and later re-occupied when security worsened in the later Roman period.

== Gallery ==
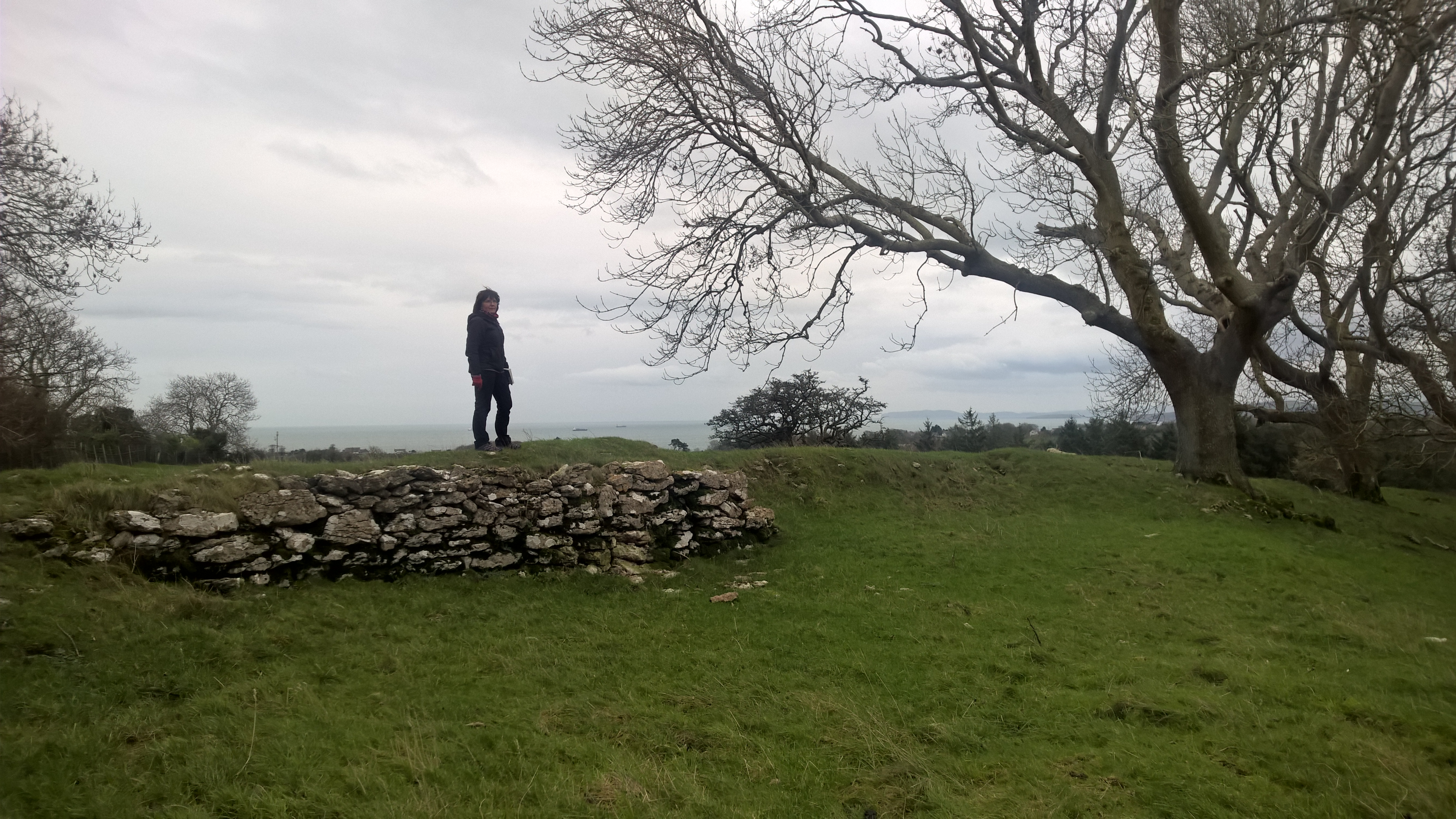

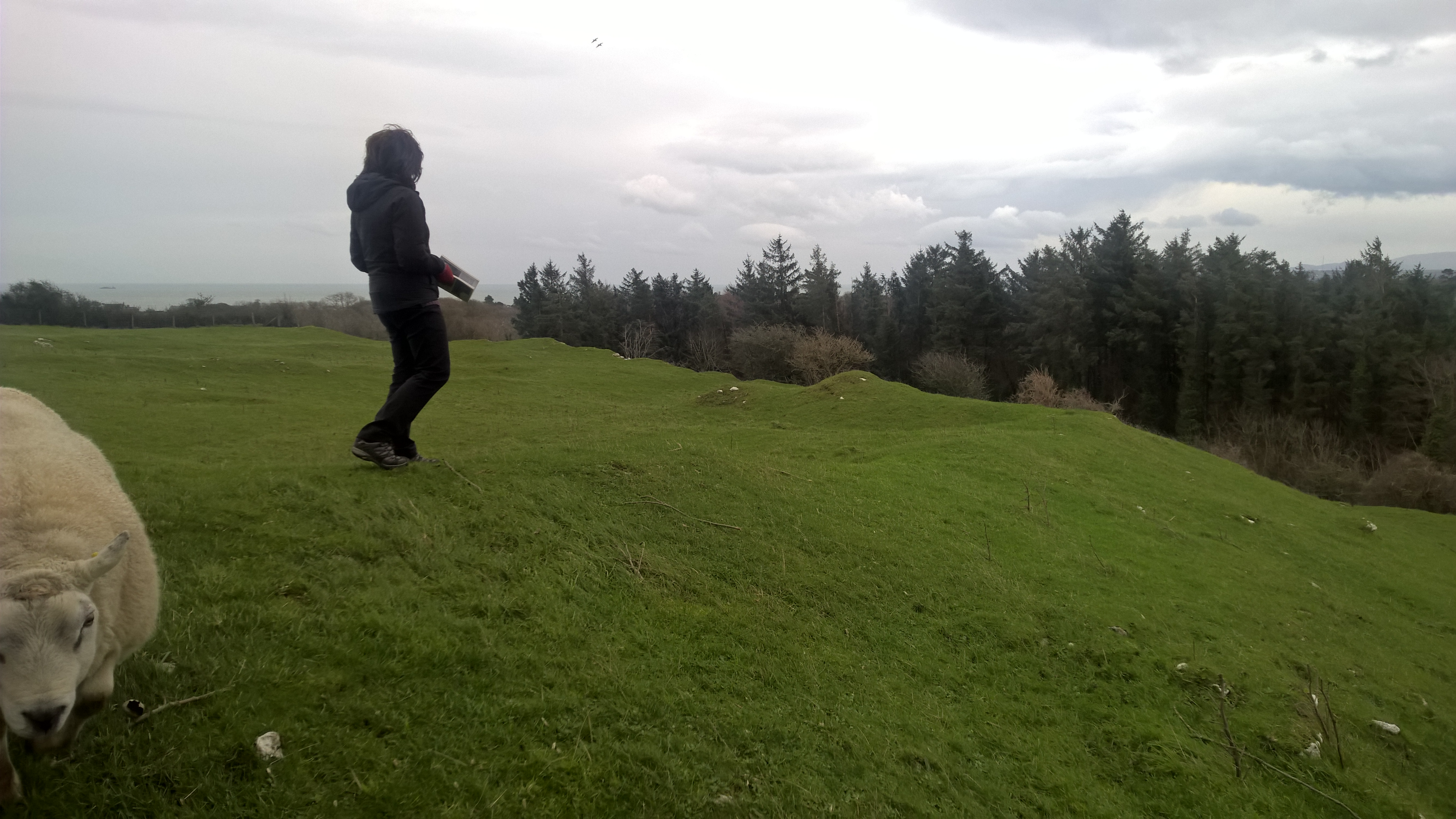

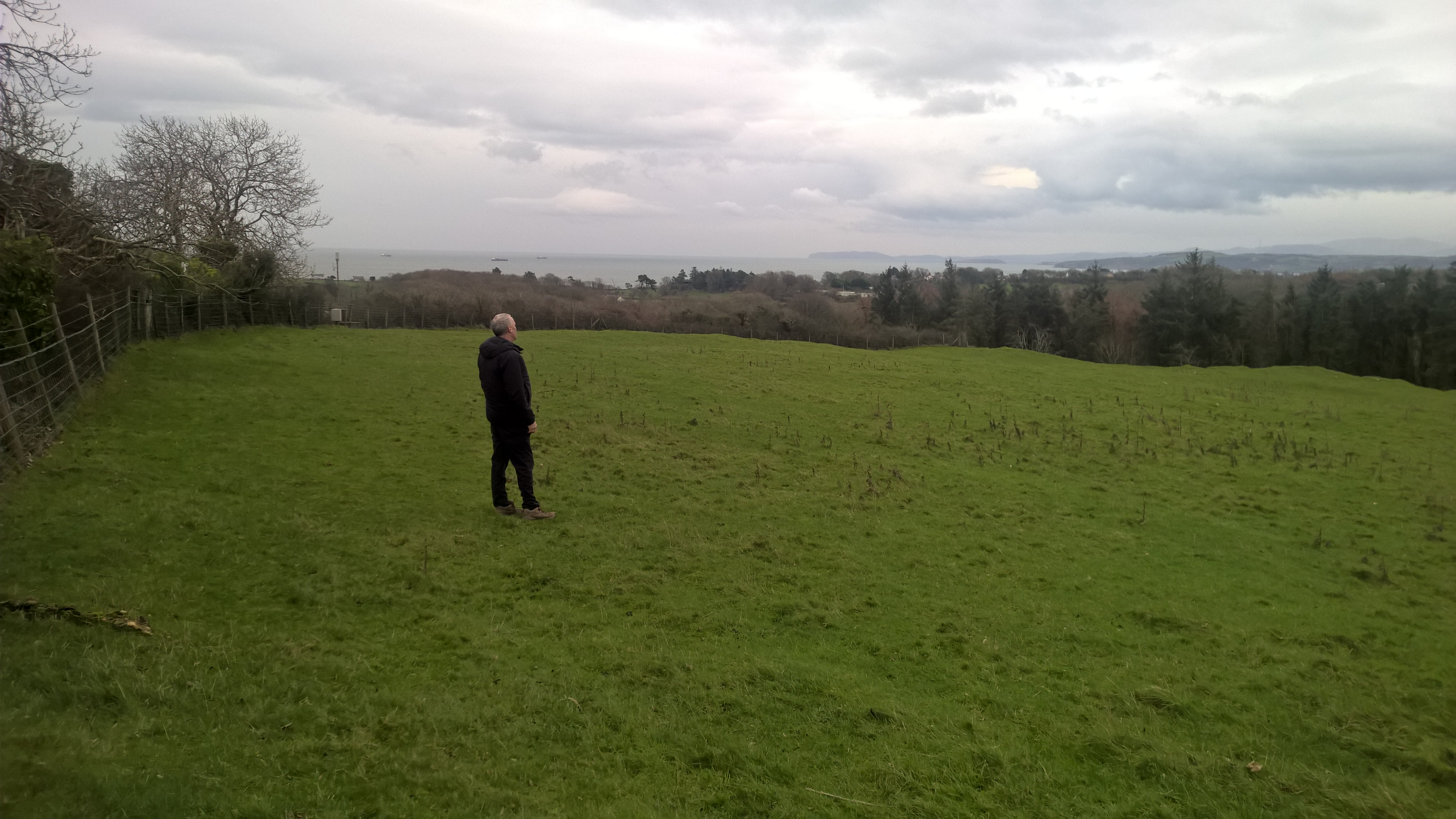

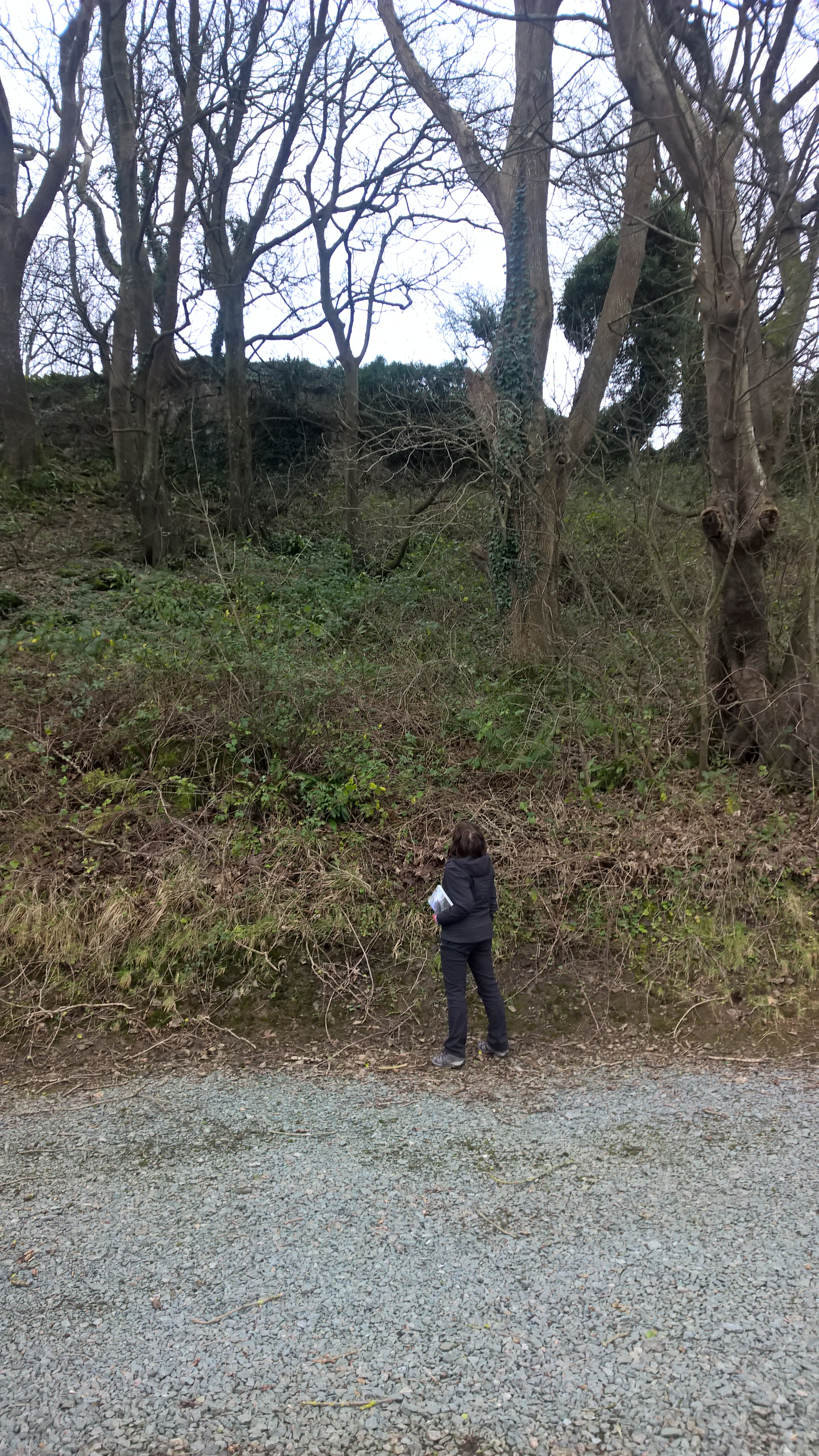
