= John Edward Jones (Welsh politician) =

Welsh political organiser

John Edward Jones (10 December 1905 – 30 May 1970), known as J. E. Jones, was a Welsh political organiser.

Born in Melin-y-Wîg near Corwen in Denbighshire, Jones studied at Bala Grammar School and the University College of Wales, Bangor. There, he was elected leader of the Students' union, and conducted a successful campaign to have Welsh made an official language there, alongside English.

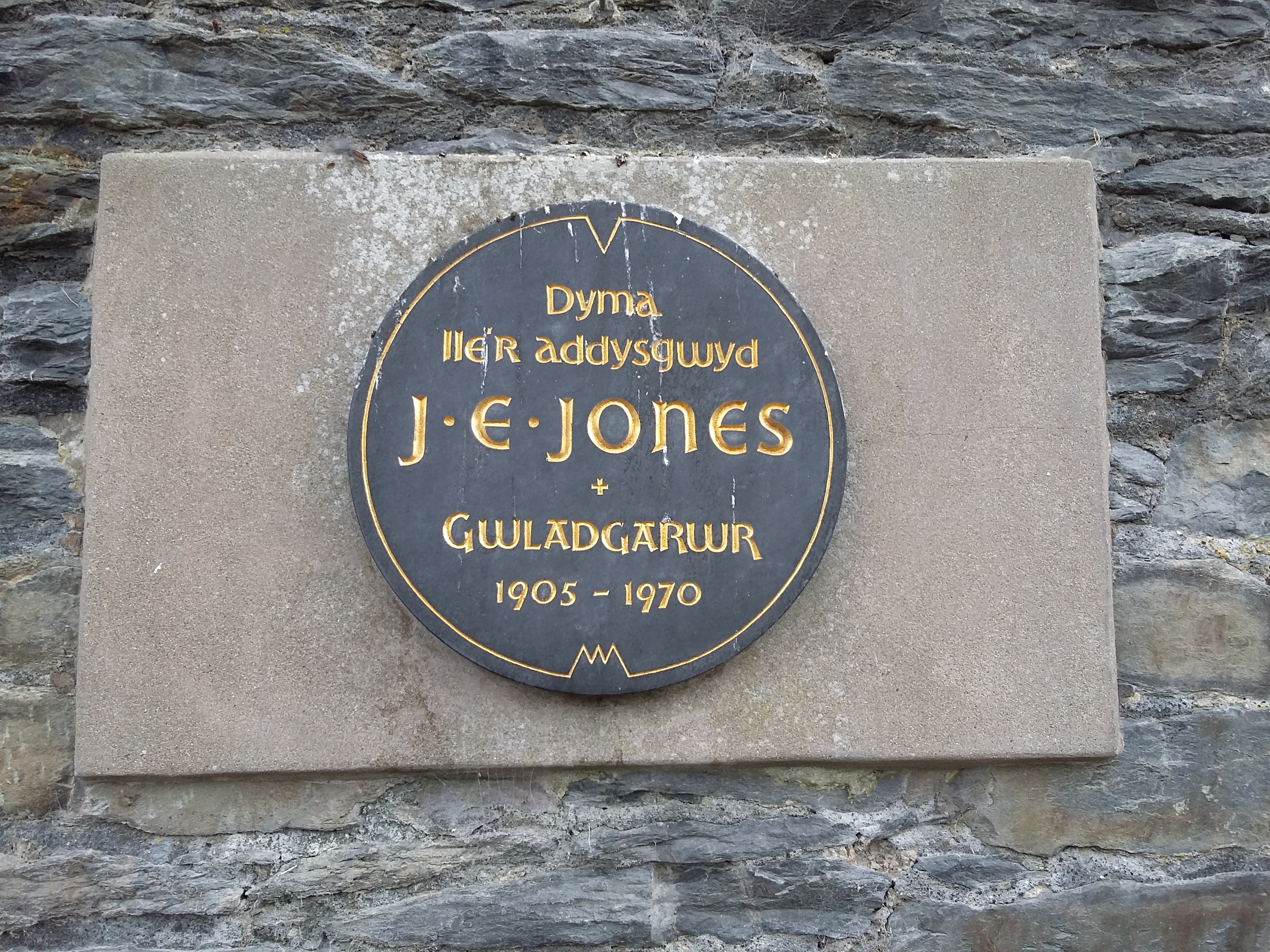
Plaque on the former school in Melin-y-Wîg, which Jones attended

Jones was active in Y Tair G, which in 1925 became a component of the new Plaid Cymru. In 1928, he became a teacher in London, and he founded a successful branch of Plaid there; as a result, in 1930, he was appointed General Secretary of the party and returned to Wales. In this role, he was responsible for organising party conferences and rallies, and supporting local branches.

Jones only stood for election once – at the 1950 general election in Caernarfon, but was publicly best known for putting together party press releases, and also for his broadcasting on the topic of gardening. He stood down in 1962, becoming an official adviser to the party.

While campaigning in the 1970 general election, Jones was killed in a car accident.

Party political offices
Preceded by Huw Robert Jones	General Secretary of Plaid Cymru; 1930–1962	Succeeded by Emrys Roberts
