= Dwynwen Berry =

Welsh scriptwriter and former actress

- Born: Llanrwst, Conwy, Wales
- Education: University of Wales, Bangor
- Occupations: scriptwriter, editor, actress, shopkeeper

Dwynwen Berry is a scriptwriter, editor, actress and shopkeeper from Llanrwst. She began her career as an actor, performing for Welsh Theatre Company, then worked for 25 years as a scriptwriter and editor, writing drama and films for S4C, before buying and running a Welsh bookshop in Llanrwst.

== Career ==
Dwynwen Berry (centre right) working on Gwreichion in 1977

She studied Welsh and Drama at the University of Wales, Bangor. After college, she moved to Cardiff and worked in theatre, including for the Welsh Theatre Company. Her first major role as an actress was in the play Gwreichion by Eigra Lewis Roberts, which was staged by Welsh Theatre Company in 1977. A scene from the play has been archived by Gwynedd Council Archives.

In the early 1980s, she stopped acting, and moved into scriptwriting.

Between 1990 and 1996, she worked as a script editor for S4C, working on films such as Hedd Wyn and Solomon & Gaenor, and dramas like Amdani, Pengelli, and Tipyn o Stad. An episode of Pengelli written by Berry is archived in The National Library of Wales Screen and Sound Archive and Wales Broadcast Archive. She wrote the Welsh-language film Mela, which was released in 2004.

After a 25-year career as a scriptwriter, she moved back to her hometown of Llanwrst. In 2007, she bought the Welsh bookshop Bys a Bawd (transl. Fingers and Thumbs) on Denbigh Street, which first opened in 1955. In 2009, she bought and expanded into the shop next door, which her father, Wil Berry, had run as a confectionary and tobacco shop until 1980. She sold it to a community scheme in 2026.

== Personal life ==
She lived in Cardiff for 25 years and then moved to Caernarfon. She moved to Llanwrst in 2007.

In September 2008, she was diagnosed with breast cancer and received treatment.

She was shortlisted for the 2009 Barclays Trading Places Awards.
