= Deiniolen =

Coordinates: 53.146°N 4.121°W

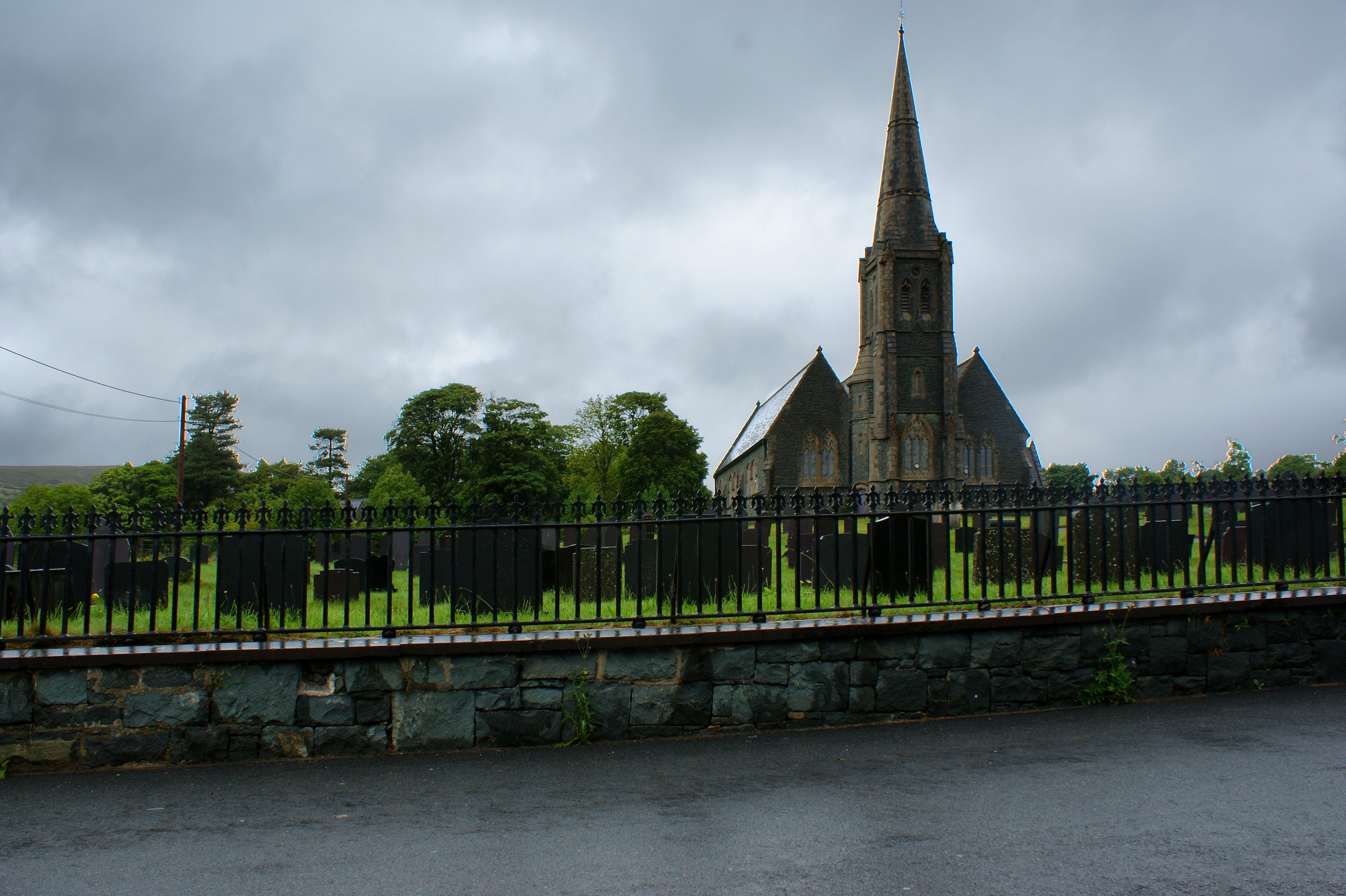
- Christ Church (Eglwys Grist), Llandinorwig

- Location within Gwynedd
- Population: 1,909 (2011)
- OS grid reference: SH581631
- Community: Llanddeiniolen
- Principal area: Gwynedd
- Preserved county: Gwynedd
- Country: Wales
- Sovereign state: United Kingdom
- Post town: CAERNARFON
- Postcode district: LL55
- Dialling code: 01286
- Police: North Wales
- Fire: North Wales
- Ambulance: Welsh
- UK Parliament: Dwyfor Meirionnydd
- Senedd Cymru – Welsh Parliament: Arfon

Deiniolen (/deɪnɪˈɒlɛn/; Welsh: [dɛinɪˈɔlɛn]; Welsh pronunciation) is a village in Gwynedd, Wales, at the foot of Elidir Fawr, in Llanddeiniolen Community. Deiniolen has views over Caernarfon (7 miles (11 km) away) and on a clear day, Holyhead Mountain and occasionally the Wicklow Mountains in Ireland, can be seen. The population of the electoral ward was 1,909 as of 2011, including nearby Dinorwig, with 81.2% of the population speaking Welsh. The community, Llanddeiniolen, has a population of 5,072 as of the 2011 census, the third-largest in Gwynedd.

Ysgol Gynradd Gwaun Gynfi provides Welsh-medium education for children between 3 and 11 years in the village.

The slate industry was an important employer in Deiniolen until the closure of Dinorwig Quarry in 1969.

== Village History ==
The settlements now known as Deiniolen and Clwt-y-Bont began in the 1820s based along the road and railway to the nearby Dinorwig Quarry. The village was originally known as Llanbabo (since several settlers arrived from the Anglesey village of Llanbabo) and later the village adopted the name Ebeneser (from the Chapel established in 1823). In the 1920s, after a campaign led by Huw Robert Jones, the village adopted its current name of Deiniolen.

Christ Church, Llandinorwig
Christ Church (Eglwys Grist) was built in 1857. The money to build the church was donated by Thomas Assheton Smith (1776–1858) of Faenol, who was the owner of the village's main employer, Dinorwig Quarry.

Ebenezer Chapel
Ebenezer Chapel (Capel Ebeneser) was built in 1823. The first minister was the Rev. David Griffydd with Rev. John Prichard being the last. Two of the most important annual events in Deiniolen are held in the chapel's vestry. These are the Deiniolen Eisteddfod and the Carnival Queen Crowning Concert; local school children take part in both events which still continue to this day throughout the village. The chapel was the source of the village's original name Ebeneser.

Cefn y Waun Chapel
Cefn y Waun Chapel (Capel Cefn-y-Waun) was built by local quarrymen in 1838. Before the chapel was built the local people held their services either in local farmhouses or in the open air. In 1867, the chapel was worth £2,100 but the chapel also had a debt of £2,100. The first minister was Rev. W. Rowlands.

== Seindorf Arian Deiniolen - Deiniolen Silver Band ==
Deiniolen Silver Band (Seindorf Arian Deiniolen) was formed (originally as Llandinorwig Brass Band) in 1835 by a group of quarrymen, and has now grown to be one of Wales' major brass bands. The band is currently competing in the First Section. Most recent success includes a third place at the National Brass Band Championships in 2015 and coming second at North Wales Rally (Open Section) in 2017.

== Deiniolen Football Club ==
Deiniolen FC was formed in around the 1950s when the side was playing in the local Caernarfon & District League. After a year absence from the local league, the team has recently reformed.

== Notable people from Deiniolen ==
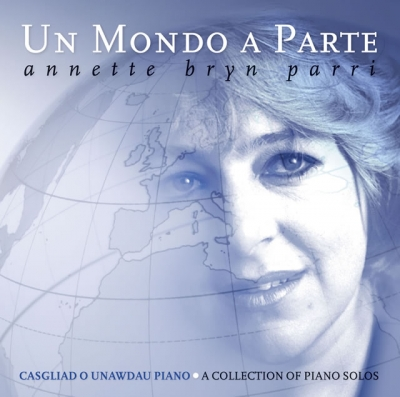
Album cover featuring Annette Bryn Parry, 2005

- Thomas Johns (1836–1914), Congregational minister, held his first pastorate here
- Huw Robert Jones (1894–1930), Welsh Nationalist politician, first general secretary of Plaid Cymru
- Gwenlyn Parry (1932–1991), a Welsh dramatist and scriptwriter
- Peter Prendergast (1946–2007), a Welsh landscape painter.
- Eirug Wyn (1950–2004), Welsh author, lived in Deiniolen
- Annette Bryn Parri (1962–2025), professional pianist
- Dave Brailsford CBE (born 1964), performance director for British Cycling, brought up in Deiniolen.
- Malcolm Allen (born 1967), professional footballer, TV S4C presenter
