= Meirion Williams =

Welsh songwriter

Meirion Williams (Dyffryn Ardudwy, 1901 – 4 October 1976) was a Welsh composer, best known for his songwriting. Williams studied with Walford Davies at the University of Aberystwyth and in 1922 went on to study piano at the Royal Academy of Music in London with Carlo Albanesi and Edgar Carr, where he won prizes for his playing.

Williams became a freelance musician and a church organist in London. He accompanied singer David Lloyd (tenor) on a series of recordings of Welsh songs for Decca in 1948. He married Gwendolen Margaret Roberts in London, and there was one daughter. He is buried at Llanenddwyn Parish Church near Dyffryn Ardudwy.

== Recordings ==
- Bryn Terfel Yn Canu Caneuon Meirion Williams – Songs of Meirion Williams Bryn Terfel (baritone), Annette Bryn Parri (piano): (1993) Sain – SCD2013
