= Roman conquest of Anglesey =

Two Roman invasions of Anglesey during the mid 1st century

Coordinates: 53.2833°N 4.3333°W

- Part of the Roman conquest of Britain
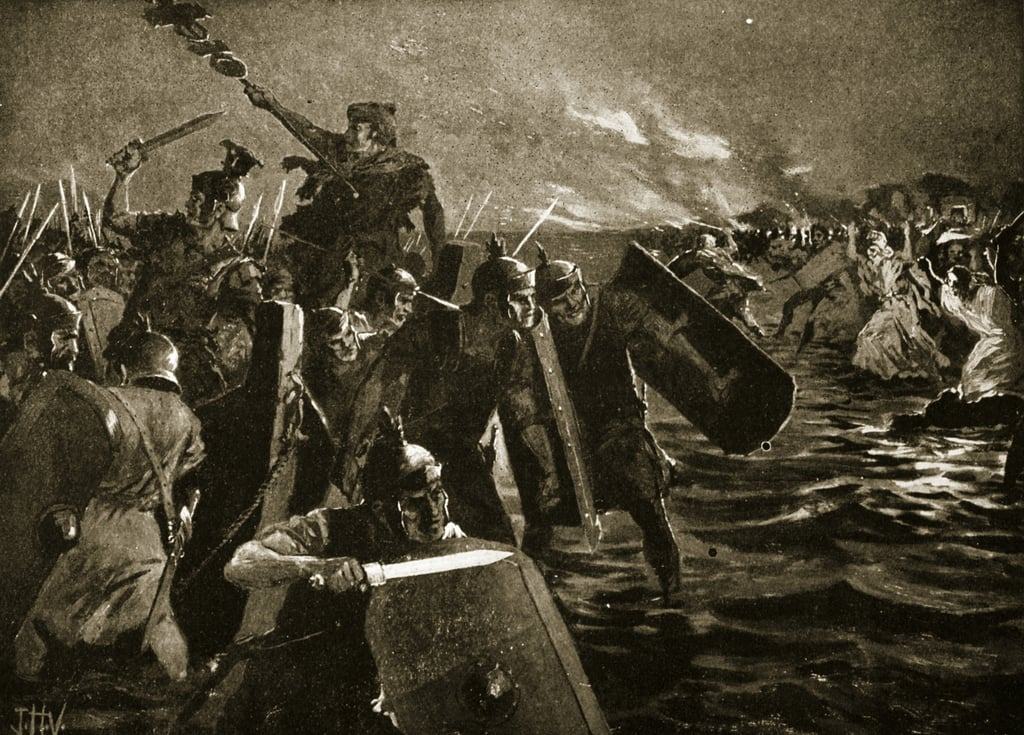
- John Harris Valda: The Roman attack on Anglesey (c. 1920s illustration)
Date	60 or 61 CE; 77 CE
Location	Anglesey
Result	Roman victory

Belligerents
Roman Empire	Britons

Commanders and leaders
Gaius Suetonius Paulinus; Agricola	Unknown

Strength
Unknown	Unknown

Casualties and losses
Unknown	Unknown

The Roman conquest of Anglesey refers to two separate invasions of Anglesey in North West Wales that occurred during the early decades of the Roman conquest of Britain in the 1st century CE. The first invasion of North Wales began after the Romans had subjugated much of southern Britain. It was led by the Provincial governor of Britannia, Suetonius Paulinus, who led a successful assault on the island in 60–61 CE, but had to withdraw because of the Boudican revolt. In 77 CE, Gnaeus Julius Agricola's thorough subjugation of the island left it under Roman rule until the end of Roman rule in Britain in the early 5th century CE. Anglesey was invaded as it was an important centre for the Celtic Druids and their religious practices which made it a place of resistance to Roman rule.

No surviving Roman sources mention Anglesey, which was recorded in Latin as Mona (and is still known as Môn in modern Welsh), after its conquest. Archaeologists have located a fort dated shortly after the first conquest near Cemlyn Bay; a trading settlement on the shore of the Menai Strait; and a village of huts huddled together on a hill for defence. In the last decades of Roman rule in Britain several military forts were built on the northern and western coasts to defend the island against Irish sea raiders. However, despite more than three centuries of Roman rule, archaeologists have found no evidence of major civic centres or villas on the island, indicating that Romano-British culture lacked the influence it had in other parts of the Roman province of Britannia.

The only Roman source for the island's two invasions is the Roman historian Tacitus. His last work The Annals, written as a history of the Roman Empire from Tiberius until Nero, mentions the first invasion by Suetonius Paulinus. The second invasion is detailed in Tacitus's work The Life of Gnaeus Julius Agricola, which was written to record and extol the life and accomplishments of his father-in-law. Tacitus may have used first-hand accounts from Agricola, who had been present with the Roman forces on both occasions.

Anglesey within Wales.

== First invasion (60 CE) ==
The first invasion of Anglesey took place in 60 or 61 CE following Suetonius Paulinus' success in other parts of the province, subjugating British tribes and establishing Roman forts. Tacitus writes: "Britain was in the hands of Suetonius Paulinus, who in military knowledge and in popular favour, which allows no one to be without a rival, vied with Corbulo, and aspired to equal the glory of the recovery of Armenia by the subjugation of Rome's enemies. He therefore prepared to attack the island of Mona which had a powerful population and was a refuge for fugitives." Tacitus, who later married the daughter of Suetonius Paulinus's young aide-de-camp, Gnaeus Julius Agricola, may have heard first-hand accounts of the campaign and even of Suetonius's personal comments.

The decision to invade may also have been motivated by information about copper mines on Anglesey.

=== Approaching the Menai Strait ===
Tacitus says: "[Suetonius Paulinus] built flat-bottomed vessels to cope with the shallows, and uncertain depths of the sea. Thus the infantry crossed, while the cavalry followed by fording, or, where the water was deep, swam by the side of their horses."

He does not state where these boats were built, perhaps Deva Victrix (Chester), where a few pre-Flavian coins may indicate an early base whose role would have been tied to the movement of troops by sea along the coasts of north Wales.

Marshy ground to the west of Chester made it a poor base for overland penetration of North Wales, and Suetonius' march to the Menai Strait may have used the oldest known crossing of the River Dee, some 13 km south of Chester at Holt. An army moving on foot along the north coast of Wales would have first seen Anglesey from the mouth of the Sychnant Pass near Abergwyngregyn, where the three land routes converge.

=== Crossing the Menai Strait ===
The Roman forces then had to cross the Menai Strait, a narrow strip of water some 8 km long that separates the island of Anglesey from the rest of the Welsh mainland. The sea crossing would be short and relatively easy at slack water, but at full strength the tidal currents can be up to 7.5 knots with much turbulence in the narrower and rockier sections. Local knowledge, at least a long enough period of observation to predict the tidal currents with reasonable accuracy, would be required to plan safe transit. (The later invasion under Agricola took the natives by surprise because they had expected to see a fleet in plenty of time to gather for their defence of the island.)

The locations of the Menai crossings are not known and modern suggestions are purely speculative. William Manning suggested that a possible site is at the north-eastern end of the Strait, near the present city of Bangor, easily accessible from the Sychnant Pass, where travellers on the mediaeval ferry set out across the Lavan Sands to cross the Strait. The Lavan Sands at low tide would be an appropriate place to ground and load flat-bottomed boats, and to assemble cavalry ready to swim. The path across the sand flats is some 4.5 km, but the sea crossing would be only some 240 metres at the lowest state of the tide. If Suetonius had established a camp a little further west, across the River Ogwen on the present site of Penrhyn Castle, Bangor Flats would have offered access to a similar 240-metre crossing, reached by only some 1.5 km on tidal sand flats. The attackers would need to time their movement across the tidal flats with care, to avoid being caught by the incoming tide before the boats were loaded and the swimming units in position. Both of these locations would require the Roman troops landing on Anglesey to fight up slopes that rise steeply almost from the water's edge, except near Gallows Point where a small peninsula and a stony beach offer some hectares of fairly flat space by the waterside.

The parish of Llanidan is on Anglesey, towards the southwestern end of the Menai Strait. The Llanidan locations require a longer sea crossing (a minimum of some 350 metres between sandbanks at low tide, some 850 metres at high tide), and offer less violent currents, less turbulence, and gentler slopes up from the sea shore. There are no large sand flats on the mainland side, but there are areas of gentle terrain where troops could have been assembled. A land force moving from the north coast of Wales to cross to Llanidan would have to cross an area of high ground, or move through a glacially-deepened valley between steep slopes that offer possible ambush positions.

Henry Rowlands in the 1700s identified a ford at Porthamel in Llanidan parish, across the Menai Strait from the present site of Felinheli, where he suggested that the Roman cavalry had swum across and the human sacrifice had happened.

Still within Llanidan parish, further southwest along the Menai Strait, local field names "Maes Hir Gad" (Area of long battle) and "Cae Oer Waedd" (Field of cold or bitter lamentation) were recorded in 1867, with the suggestion that these may indicate the site of a Roman attack.

=== Opposition ===
The landing was opposed by a mass of warriors, Druids, and women. Tacitus describes the scene: "On the shore stood the opposing army with its dense array of armed warriors, while between the ranks dashed women, in black attire like the Furies, with hair dishevelled, waving brands. All around, the Druids, lifting up their hands to heaven, and pouring forth dreadful imprecations, scared our soldiers by the unfamiliar sight, so that, as if their limbs were paralysed, they stood motionless, and exposed to wounds." Roman soldiers are not often described as scared to paralysis and their reception must have been an extraordinary experience even for professional soldiers.

However, the Romans rallied, and won a brutal victory over people who they regarded as savages. Tacitus reports: "Then urged by their general's appeals and mutual encouragements not to quail before a troop of frenzied women, they bore the standards onwards, smote down all resistance, and wrapped the foe in the flames of his own brands."

=== Garrison, destruction of sacred groves ===
Tacitus suggests that the Romans then had time to make their occupation of the island effective. "A force was next set over the conquered, and their groves, devoted to inhuman superstitions, were destroyed. They deemed it indeed a duty to cover their altars with the blood of captives and to consult their deities through human entrails." The Iron Age settlement between Bryn Celli Ddu (Black Grove Hill) and Llanddaniel Fab, on a landscape of more ancient Neolithic and Bronze Age tombs, may have been a centre of Druidic practice and a target of Suetonius's invasion.

=== Romans abandon the island ===
The Roman army shortly received serious news from southern Britain. Tacitus writes: "Suetonius while thus occupied received tidings of the sudden revolt of the province..." "Suetonius, however, with wonderful resolution, marched amidst a hostile population to Londinium..."

The Roman troops left Anglesey, which remained free from Roman rule for sixteen years until the second invasion under Agricola.

== Between Roman attacks ==
After the Boudican revolt, the conquest of Wales was put on hold. Between Suetonius and Agricola, the province of Britannia had five British governors but none undertook any further military campaigns in the regions known as Cambria. In general the Romans, affected by social and military conflicts throughout the Empire, unrest in the legions garrisoned in Britain, and the aftermath of Boudica's rebellion, did not try to take more territory in this phase. Only after Vespasian became emperor in 69 CE was the conquest of Wales resumed, as Tacitus records in his book The Life of Gnaeus Julius Agricola. Agricola's predecessor Julius Frontinus arrived in 74 CE to resume the conquest of Wales. Tacitus only gives one line about Frontinus, claiming he subdued the powerful Silures tribe in South Wales. He continues: "Such was the state of Britain, and such were the vicissitudes of the war, which Agricola found on his crossing over about midsummer. Our soldiers made it a pretext for carelessness, as if all fighting was over, and the enemy were biding their time."

== Second invasion (77 CE) ==
The second invasion of Anglesey was undertaken by Agricola, by then the Roman Governor of Britannia, in late 77. Tacitus' account of the invasion may be dramatized and his reliability should be carefully considered, especially because Tacitus was the husband of Agricola's daughter. However, his account is the only written record of the second invasion.

=== Situation on Agricola's arrival ===
Tacitus implies that the tribes on the border of the Roman province were generally hostile, kept from revolting by fear of the Roman forces and their leadership, and that they were informed of events and major personalities in the rest of Britain: "The Ordovices, shortly before Agricola's arrival, had destroyed nearly the whole of a squadron of allied cavalry quartered in their territory. Such a beginning raised the hopes of the country, and all who wished for war approved the precedent, and anxiously watched the temper of the new governor. Meanwhile, Agricola, though summer was past and the detachments were scattered throughout the province, though the soldiers' confident anticipation of inaction for that year would be a source of delay and difficulty in beginning a campaign, and most advisers thought it best simply to watch all weak points, resolved to face the peril."

=== Defeat of the Ordovices on the mainland of Wales ===
Tacitus presents Agricola as a courageous and aggressive leader: "He collected a force of veterans and a small body of auxiliaries; then as the Ordovices would not venture to descend into the plain, he put himself in front of the ranks to inspire all with the same courage against a common danger, and led his troops up a hill. The tribe was all but exterminated." The location of this battle is unknown, but the hillfort Dinas Dinorwig is on a foothill some 3 km from the Menai Strait. The name Dinorwig has been supposed to mean "fort of the Ordovices".

=== Exploitation of victory ===
Tacitus again attributes the Roman strategy to the virtue of his father-in-law: "Well aware that he must follow up the prestige of his arms, and that in proportion to his first success would be the terror of the other tribes, he formed the design of subjugating the island of Mona, from the occupation of which Paulinus had been recalled, as I have already related, by the rebellion of the entire province. But, as his plans were not matured, he had no fleet." Agricola's victory on the mainland, wherever it was, left him within striking distance of the strait and the island which he and some of his veterans must have remembered.

=== Crossing the Menai Strait ===
Tacitus again praises Agricola's military audacity and skill. The attack was a tactical surprise by auxiliaries, recruited in Britain, who swam across the strait, without legionaries and without using boats. The leadership on Mona had expected to have more time to prepare, and this sudden attack demoralized them to the point of submission: "The skill and resolution of the general accomplished the passage. With some picked men of the auxiliaries, disencumbered of all baggage, who knew the shallows and had that national experience in swimming which enables the Britons to take care not only of themselves but of their arms and horses, he delivered so unexpected an attack that the astonished enemy who were looking for a fleet, a naval armament, and an assault by sea, thought that to such assailants nothing could be formidable or invincible."

The location of this crossing is also unknown and could have been anywhere along the Strait; possibly, the place names around Llanidan might be associated with this attack rather than Paulinus' earlier assault. An army coming from Dinas Dinorwig might have moved most directly, some 3 km, to the south-western reaches of the Menai Strait opposite Llanidan.

=== Surrender ===
The virtue of Tacitus's hero become widely known: "And so, peace having been sued for and the island given up, Agricola became great and famous..."

== Aftermath ==
After the second invasion of Anglesey the Romans administered the island for over three centuries.

=== Military occupation ===
The Cemlyn Cropmark is the first Roman military site on the island, dated around the time of the second invasion in 77 CE. The cropmark was discovered in 1990 on an aerial photograph during a long dry spell. In 2015 a geophysical survey of the cropmark revealed characteristics of a typical Roman fortlet. Partial excavation of the site found two coins, one from Nerva's reign and one from Hadrian's, supporting the dating of the fortlet to post-invasion consolidation. The fortlet overlooks Cemlyn Bay, a good landing place on the north-coast of the island, and would have most likely served as a guide for landing sea-craft as well as a policing station for those wanting access to Anglesey.

=== Life under long-term Roman control ===
The Romans administered the island from Segontium (Caernarfon), a fort in mainland Wales just across the Menai Straits. By the end of that period, over most of the Empire, the city-based elites had assimilated into Roman culture, but no city has been found on the island, nor any sign of such an elite, and archaeology has revealed little Roman-style building. At Caer Lêb in the south of the island there is evidence of a possible farmstead, with a few Roman-period rectangular buildings outnumbered by traditional round houses nearby. Presumably the agricultural economy continued functioning with little change after Agricola's conquest.

Copper had been mined on Parys Mountain for centuries before the Roman arrival, and copper production – possibly increased, for export from the island – seems to have continued. Some 18 round ingots of copper, eight with Roman stamps, have been found on the island, two on Parys Mountain itself though the smelting sites are unknown.

The settlement at Tai Cochion sits close to the Menai Strait across from Segontium (the auxiliary fort that oversaw the island). Excavation of one of the buildings revealed what appears to be Roman-style corridor housing, unlike the circular huts whose use continued in the rest of the island. Pottery and coins date its floruit to 100–300 CE; it was probably established as a civilian trading point shortly after the second invasion.

=== Growing insecurity, raids from the Irish Sea ===
Centuries passed with little known change to the island, but by the mid-fourth century a shore-fort, Caer Gybi, facing Ireland, was created as a base to secure the island against seaborne threats. The fort walls remain visible. Around the same time, Parciau hill fort contained a dense concentration of population in a defensible location, indicating a perception of significant insecurity. (Saint Patrick was kidnapped from somewhere near the west coast of Great Britain about 400 CE and taken as a slave to Ireland, and his Letter to Coroticus complains about a murderous slave raid on Ireland from Great Britain.)

Pen Bryn-yr-Eglwys is a rocky hilltop on the north-western corner of Anglesey, with a square stone platform measuring 9m by 7m on top. This has traditionally been assumed to be the remains of a chapel. However, the positioning of the platform, its small size, and three sherds of probably-Roman pottery, all strongly suggest that Pen Bryn-yr-Eglwys was a Roman watchtower.

A similar site, also interpreted as a watchtower, has been excavated inside the pre-Roman fort of Caer y Twr on Holyhead Mountain. There is a possible second fortlet on Bwrdd Arthur, towards the eastern end of the north coast of the island.

=== Failure of empire ===
Direct Roman military control may have ceased on Anglesey about 383, when Magnus Maximus took much of the garrison of Britannia to the Continent to support his unsuccessful bid for imperial power. In 410, Honorius advised the remaining Roman cities in Britain that they should look to their own defence, and no imperial regime is known to have appointed officials to Britain thereafter.

=== Post-Roman ===
The fort of Caer Gybi in Holyhead is the site of St Cybi's Church. According to a 12th-century source the site had been given to Saint Cybi by Maelgwn Gwynedd in the sixth century CE.

== See also ==
- Defeat of Boudica
- Boudica
