= Annette Bryn Parri =

Welsh pianist and accompanist (1962–2025)

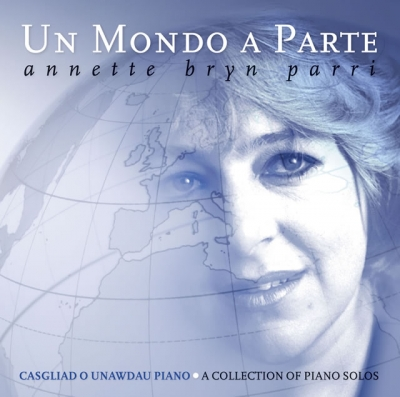
Album cover Un Mondo A Parte (2005)

Romance de Amor played by Annette Bryn Parri

Annette Bryn Parri (1962–2025) was a Welsh pianist, best known as an accompanist to opera stars such as Bryn Terfel and Rebecca Evans. Parri appeared regularly on the National Eisteddfod stage, and also at the International Eisteddfod at Llangollen.

== Early life ==
Parri was born in Deiniolen, Wales. Having studied piano with Rhiannon Gabrielson, Parri graduated with a GRNCM in 1984 from the Royal Northern College of Music in Manchester after studying under Marjorie Clementi. Whilst at Manchester, she specialized in lieder, oratorio and opera, but her particular interest was in the Romantic composers. In 1982, she won the Grace Williams Medal for composition at the Urdd Gobaith Cymru Eisteddfod at Pwllheli.

== Career ==
After leaving the Royal Northern College of Music, Parri joined the staff of the Music Department of Bangor University as a piano tutor.

Parri became an official accompanist at the age of fifteen and made her first appearance in 1983, at the National Eisteddfod in Llangefni. She won the Blue Riband for instrumentalists at the Rhyl National Eisteddfod in 1985. Parri has accompanied at the Albert Hall, London on several occasions and has also performed in private for Sir Andrew Lloyd Webber, Sir Georg Solti, Prince Charles and Princess Diana. She can be heard accompanying artists such as Bryn Terfel, Aled Jones, Eirian James, Gwyn Hughes-Jones, Leah Marian Jones and Rebecca Evans, and she has appeared on several S4C series, including Noson Lawen, Cân i Gymru and giving a masterclass on Meistroli.

Since 1993 Parri has accompanied the choirs of Ysgol Glanaethwy performing arts school in Bangor. From 2002 to 2011 she was musical director of the Traeth Male Voice Choir. In 2013 she established TRIO, a male vocal trio.

Parri made her debut at the Edinburgh Festival Fringe in 2005.

In 2024 Parri took on the role of musical director of the newly formed North Wales Police Choir. The choir went on to be the first ever emergency service choir to sing on the National Eisteddfod stage.

Parri died in May 2025.

== Selected discography ==
- Caneuon Meirion Williams – The Songs Of Meirion Williams (Sain, 1993)
- Un Mondo A Parte (Sain, 2006)
- Annette (Sain, 2010)
