= Melville Richards =

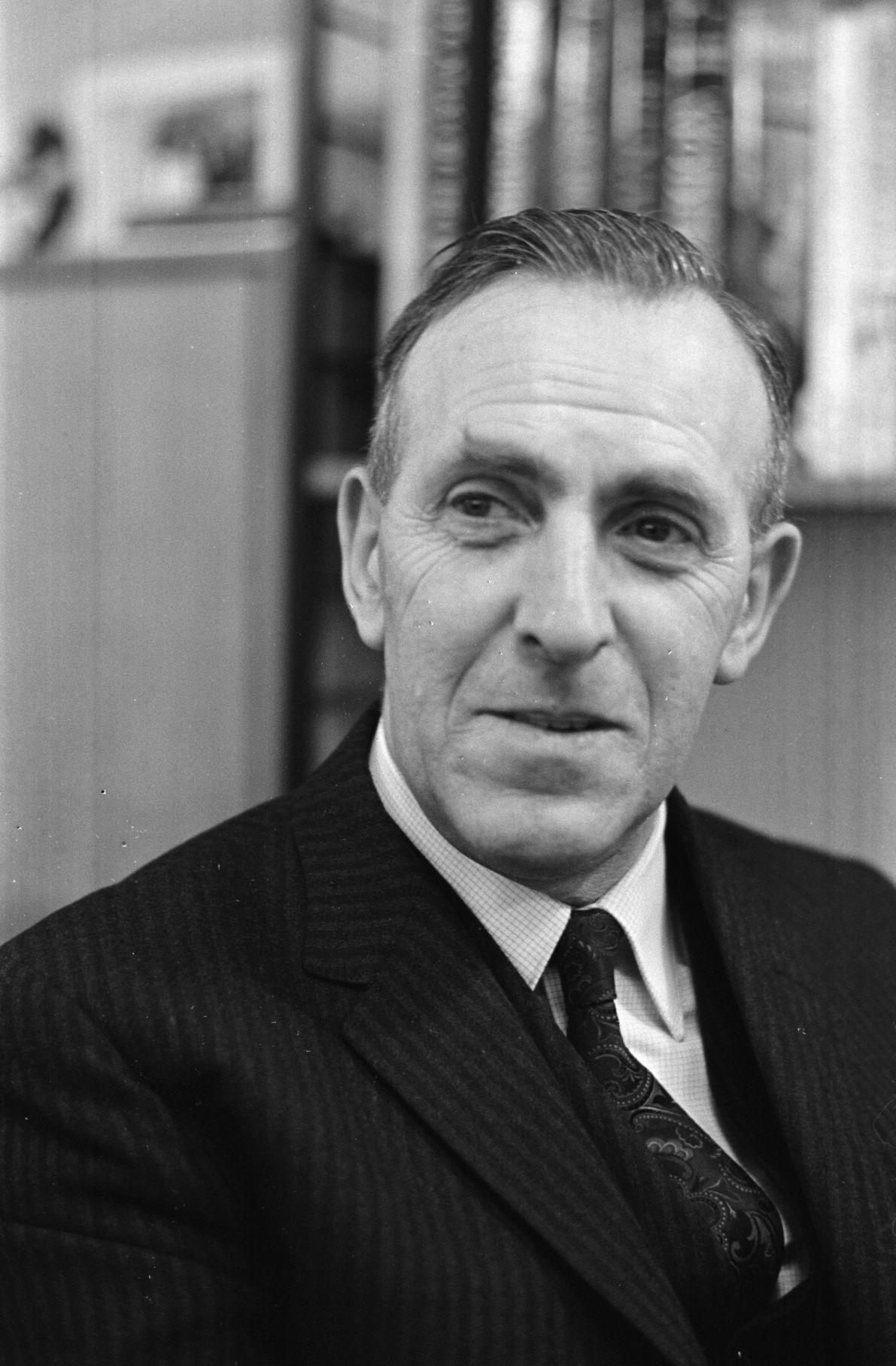
Image of Professor Melville Richards

Grafton Melville Richards (1910-1973) was a Welsh scholar in the field of Welsh language and literature and Celtic studies.

== Early life ==
He was born on 29 September 1910 as the third son of William and Elizabeth Richards (his father was a railway foreman) in Ffair-fach, Llandybie, Llandeilo, Carms. Grafton Melville Richards married Ethyn Anne Bowen in Llanelli in July 1939 and had a son and daughter - Ieuan and Sian. He was educated at Neath Grammar School and went onto achieve a first-class (1:1) Honours degree in Welsh from the University College of Swansea, (now Swansea University) starting in 1928 and finishing in 1931.

== Academic beginnings ==
In 1933, he gained a research M.A. with distinction. Following on from that, he was elected to a University Fellowship in 1934 which enabled him to continue his studies in Dublin with the scholars, Osborn Bergin, Myles Dillon and Gerard Murphy, as well as in Paris with Joseph Vendryes, Antoine Meillet and Émile Benveniste. In October 1936, he was given the position of Research Assistant Lecturer in Welsh at Swansea University and later became Assistant Lecturer in April 1937. This followed the dismissal of Saunders Lewis following the Tân yn Llŷn, and he faced criticism for taking the post under these circumstances. However, he was already a member of staff and an assistant lecturer at the time. Melville Richards published his work in academic journals on the syntax of the sentence in Medieval Welsh and revealed his ability early in his career as he was one of a number of language scholars that were associated with Henry Lewis.

== War service at Bletchley Park ==
During the Second World War, Melville Richards was attached to Bletchley Park. His name is listed on the Bletchley Park roll of honour with the grade of FO (Foreign Office) civilian; he served at Bletchley Park between 1941-1945 in Hut 9A, Elmers School, Hut 18 and Block G, ISOS (Illicit Service Oliver Strachey. ISOS was responsible for Abwehr communications using manual codes and ciphers. He used his experiences at war to write his only novel Y Gelyn Mewnol (The Enemy Within), an espionage story set in West Wales which won the Bangor National Eisteddfod thriller novel competition in 1943. The novel tells the story of a British Secret Service operation to frustrate a fictitious German Fifth Column action in West Wales. The plot involves a Welsh-speaking British Secret Service agent with a background somewhat similar to Melville Richards himself. It features documents recovered from a U-boat sunk by the RAF in Cardigan Bay and the solution of a cryptogram intercepted by MI5. The novel was published in book form by Llyfrau'r Dryw in 1946.'

== Post-war academic career ==
After the end of the war, he returned to Swansea University where he was appointed Lecturer (where he stayed until 1947), then he became Reader and Head of Celtic Studies Department in Liverpool University. From there, he was elected to the Chair of Welsh at the University College of North Wales, Bangor in 1965. He gained a PhD from Liverpool 1965.

== Celtic studies and Welsh syntax ==
Melville Richard's first areas of interest in his research were Celtic studies and Welsh syntax. In his early research, he published Llawlyfr Hen Wyddeleg in 1935 which was a handbook based on Rudolf Thurneysen's magisterial 'Grammar of Old Irish'. In 1938, he published Cystrawen y Frawddeg Gymraeg which is a clear guide to the syntax of the sentence in modern Welsh. However, it was unfavourably reviewed by T. J. Morgan in Y Llenor. He continued to work on the syntax of Middle Welsh and Early Modern Welsh and published a number of texts including Breuddwyt Ronabwy (The Dream of Rhonabwy) (1948). His area of research started changing in the early 1950s as he started to publish work on Welsh place-names and onomastics which led on to be his primary academic interest.

== Place names of Wales ==
He single-handedly produced an historical archive of place-names in Wales and made clear their meaning and significance in a comprehensive Welsh onomasticon. His research was conducted in a range of fields of study which are: settlement patterns and demography, the history of governance and administration, legal custom and structures, toponyms as well as the more strictly linguistic area. Melville Richards did not succeed in publishing his place-names research as he intended but his archive of 300,000 slips, which is held by the Archives and Special Collections at Bangor University Library, has been edited and is available online (transcribed in Welsh and English).

Melville Richards published a translation of Llyfr Blegywryd, The Laws of Hywel Dda (1954), Cyfraith Hywel and an edition of the manuscript Jesus College LVII (1957), Welsh Administrative and Territorial Units (1969) as well as editing Atlas Môn, an Atlas of Anglesey in Welsh and English in 1972. He also published important articles explaining the significance of place-names and laying out the methodology and scholarly standards in a hazardous area of academic study. Some of his research and work brought him international recognition. For example, 'his contributions to the Batsford The names of towns and cities in Britain (1970), as a member of the council of the English Place-Name Society, a member of the International Committee on Onomastic Sciences and chairman of the Council for Name Studies of Great Britain and Ireland...' In The Fictitious Kingdom of Teyrnllwg (1959), Richards criticized an earlier work that worked out a hoax kingdom of Teyrnllwg, which was derived from unreliable Welsh genealogical material related to Iolo Morganwg.

== End of life ==
Around 1970, his health deteriorated. He died unexpectedly at home in Benllech, Anglesey on 3 November 1973. His funeral service was held in Colwyn Bay Crematorium on 8 November.
