= CBM =

CBM may refer to:

== Businesses and corporations ==
- Cambrex Corporation (NYSE: CBM)
- CBM (AM), a radio station in Montreal now known as CBME-FM
- CBM-FM, a radio station in Montreal
- CBM TV, a scrapped Freeview channel
- Central Bank of Myanmar
- Chesapeake Bay Magazine, a monthly publication focusing on boating, leisure, and lifestyle in the mid-Atlantic region
- Christian Blind Mission, a charity working to help people with disabilities
- Commodore International, originally "Commodore Business Machines, Inc." (CBM)
- Congo-Balolo Mission (CBM), a defunct British Baptist missionary society that was active in the Belgian Congo
- Mesoamerican Biological Corridor (Corredor Biológico Mesoamericano), a multinational agreement and project for the conservation of biodiversity

== Science and technology ==
- Bromochloromethane, a halomethane
- Captive bubble method, an instrumental surface analysis
- Carbohydrate-binding module
- Ceramic building material, an umbrella term used in archaeology to refer to all building materials made from baked clay
- Coalbed methane a form of CMM, coal mine methane
- Cognitive bias modification, a set of procedures used in psychology that aim to change biases in cognitive processes
- Common berthing mechanism, a structure in the International Space Station
- Computer-Based Math, a math education reform movement
- Condition-based maintenance, maintenance when needed
- Condition based monitoring, see Condition monitoring (CM)
- Conduction Band Minimum, lowest energy of the electrons in the conduction band of a (semiconducting) solid, see band gap
- Cosmic microwave background, "relic radiation" from the Big Bang
- Cubic metre, a unit of volume

== Other ==
- Canadian Baptist Ministries
- Canadian Baptist Mission
- Certified Broadcast Meteorologist, an American Meteorological Society certification
- Certified Business Manager
- College of Business Management, one of the constituent colleges of the Institute of Business Management in Karachi, Pakistan
- Community-based monitoring, a form of public oversight
- Community beat manager, a police officer in the Lancashire Constabulary who is responsible for a particular ward area of a town
- Component business model
- Confidence-building measures
- Contra body movement in ballroom dancing
- Covered business method patent
- Curriculum-based measurement, an assessment method to track student progress in basic skills (i.e., reading, writing, and arithmetic)
- Columbus Air Force Base, which has the IATA and FAA LID CBM
