= Certified Business Manager =

The Certified Business Manager (CBM) is a credential created and administered by the Association of Professionals in Business Management (APBM). It was designed to validate the mastery of business management knowledge, skills, and abilities.

An individual is eligible to take the examinations with either an undergraduate degree from an accredited college or university or international equivalent and a minimum of four years full-time work experience, or a graduate degree from an accredited college or university or international equivalent and a minimum of three years full-time work experience.

== Content ==
The examination consists of four parts:

- Part 1- The Core Exam consisting of 150 multiple-choice questions and covering general management, operations management, marketing management, quality and process management and human resources management.
- Part 2- The Functional Exam consisting of 150 multiple-choice questions and covering finance, accounting, information technology, corporate control and governance and international business.
- Part 3- The Integrated Exam consisting of 100 multiple-choice questions and covering 40 applications of the core and functional exam areas.
- Part 4- The Capstone Exam consisting of a Harvard Business School case study.

== See also ==
- Professional certification (business)
- Chartered Management Institute
- Canadian Institute of Management
- Certified MBA (CMBA)
- Certified Management Consultant
