= CMBA =

CMBA refers to:

- Carnegie Mellon Business Association - see Tepper School of Business
- Certified MBA, a professional certification
- Classic Moth Boat Association - see Moth (dinghy)
- Cleveland Metropolitan Bar Association
