= Chartered Manager =

Chartered Manager refers to a professional certification in management:

- C.Mgr., offered by Chartered Managers Canada
- CMgr, offered by the Chartered Management Institute, U.K.
