= UPSI =

UPSI may refer to:

- Universities' Police Science Institute
- Sultan Idris Education University
- unprotected sexual intercourse
- unpublished price-sensitive information
- Ukrainian Party of Socialist Independists
