= Certified MBA =

Professional certification

Certified MBA (CMBA) was a professional certification designed as an "objective measure of a student's grasp of the MBA skill set". It was offered by the International Certification Institute.

The CMBA focused on the "10 key subject areas" comprising the MBA "core curriculum" (Financial Accounting, Management Accounting, Quantitative Analysis, Microeconomics, Macroeconomics, Finance, Marketing Management, Operations Management, Organizational Behavior, and Business Strategy). The certification was a series of exams taken over several days. Each four-hour exam focused on several of the subject areas and was composed of multiple choice questions. The exams were administered by Prometric.

The certification was incorporated into the Western Governors University MBA program for several years.

== See also ==
- Professional certification (Business)
- Chartered Manager (disambiguation)
- Certified Business Manager (CBM)
- Certified Management Consultant
