= Professional Manager =

British business magazine

Professional Manager is a magazine published in London, the United Kingdom.

It is the journal of the Chartered Management Institute. It is published by Think Publishing. In pursuit of its overarching goal to help managers get the best from people, it showcases innovations in management theory and encourages readers to rethink their approaches and challenge received wisdom. Senior managers and leaders are interviewed in its pages. Recent cover stars include Ann Summers chief executive, former cabinet secretary Gus O'Donnell, and charity boss, Cherie Blair. Its Winter 2016 edition featured an image of Wikipedia founder Jimmy Wales.
