= Universities' Police Science Institute =

Policing research institute in Wales

Universities' Police Science Institute [UPSI]
- Established: 2007
- Director: Dr. Amanda Robinson
- Location: Cardiff, United Kingdom
- Website: http://www.upsi.org.uk/

The Universities' Police Science Institute, or UPSI as it is more commonly known, is a joint venture between South Wales Police, Cardiff University and the University of South Wales. UPSI was formed in 2007 to develop research into policing and is now housed as one of four research units within Cardiff University's Security, Crime, and Intelligence Innovation Institute. Since its inception, the UPSI has achieved international renown for its innovations in designing, developing and assessing new solutions to policing problems.

== About UPSI ==
The Universities' Police Science Institute is responsible for conducting research into policing methods such as major crime investigations, neighbourhood policing and crime analysis.

In addition to their main research, the UPSI team have vast expertise within policing generally and have especially helped to influence ACPO, Home Office and HMIC policies over the last decade.

The Universities' Police Science Institute receives the majority of its research funding from the Economic and Social Research Council (ESRC). Since its launch in 2007, UPSI has received over £5 million in external research funding from policing and governmental agencies.

Currently UPSIs' research is focused on five main areas:

- Counter-terrorism policing
- Targeting vulnerability and high-harm crimes
- Policing partnerships
- Digital policing
- Embedding evidence and knowledge-based practice into policing

== Projects ==
Currently the Universities' Police Science Institute (UPSI) is working on three major research projects. These projects involve other partner agencies such as the South Wales Police and the Police Academy of the Netherlands.

UPSIs' three projects are:

Tackling Radicalisation in Dispersed Societies (TaRDiS)

Tackling Radicalisation in Dispersed Societies (TaRDis) is a multi-agency project involving the London Borough of Sutton, the Police Academy of the Netherlands and UPSI, funded by the European Commission. TaRDis objective is to explore how the risks of radicalisation can be reduced in communities where there are no defined population centres or clusters.

Community Policing and Community Intelligence

Community Policing and Community Intelligence is an ongoing project between the South Wales Police and the UPSI, exploring the application of community intelligence in areas of policing priorities within South Wales.

Safer Sutton Partnership

The Safer Sutton Partnership is a joint venture between the London Borough of Sutton and other agencies, including UPSI. The Safer Sutton Partnership is in its fifth consecutive year and is designed to use community intelligence gathering methodology to understand local community concerns and inform interventions to address them through neighbourhood policing.

== Publications ==
Since 2007 UPSI have published multiple journals, research reports, briefing notes and official reports for the Home Office, HMIC, ACPO and numerous other agencies; The most well-known UPSI Publications are:

- Assessing the Effects of Prevent Policing - A Report to the Association of Chief Police Officers (ACPO).
- Re-thinking the Policing of Anti-Social Behaviour - A Report to HMIC.
- Policing, Situational Intelligence and the Information Environment - A Report to HMIC.

== Notable Staff ==
- Dr. Amanda Robinson, Director, Universities' Police Science Institute
- Professor Martin Innes, Director, Crime and Security Research Institute
