= Police community support officer =

Uniformed police staff role within some British police forces

A police community support officer (PCSO; Welsh: swyddog cymorth cymunedol yr heddlu, SCCH), or as written in legislation Community Support Officer (CSO; Welsh: swyddog cymorth cymunedol, SCC), is a uniformed member of police staff in England and Wales. They are not warranted, but hold a variety of police powers and the power of a constable in various instances by the forty-three territorial police forces in England and Wales and the British Transport Police (which is the only specialist police service to employ PCSOs).

There are similar roles in many other countries, including Australia, Belgium, Canada, and Sri Lanka. In the United States, community service officers play a similar role, but are not dispatched to ongoing incidents.

== History ==
The police community support officer (PCSO) role was created by Section 38(2) of the Police Reform Act 2002, which was given Royal Assent by Queen Elizabeth II on 24 July 2002. PCSOs were introduced in September 2002 and first recruited by the Metropolitan Police. Proposals for PCSOs in Northern Ireland were prevented by a budget shortfall in the Police Service of Northern Ireland, as well as fears that the introduction of uniformed and unarmed PCSOs in Northern Ireland (PSNI constables all carry firearms) would mean they would potentially then become a "legitimate target" in the eyes of the IRA who have attacked other civilians working for the police in Northern Ireland in the past.

The Police Reform Act 2002 does not apply to Scotland, which consequently does not have Police Community Support Officers (the initialism "PCSO" in Police Scotland refers to a Police Custody and Security Officer, known as a detention officer in other parts of the UK).

As of September 2022, there were 8,263 PCSOs in England and Wales. PCSO numbers had, like those of police constables, been falling in previous years owing to austerity. At their prior peak in 2009, 16,814 PCSOs were employed. PCSOs represent 6.8% of total police employees in England and Wales. The Metropolitan Police has the highest contingent of PCSOs, accounting for a quarter of PCSOs in England and Wales. The service with the second largest contingent as of 2012 was Greater Manchester Police (GMP) with 837 PCSOs, which was 5% of the total.

As of 2023, pay for PCSOs, which varies from force to force, ranges between £19,000 to around £26,000 per year depending on experience.

== Role ==
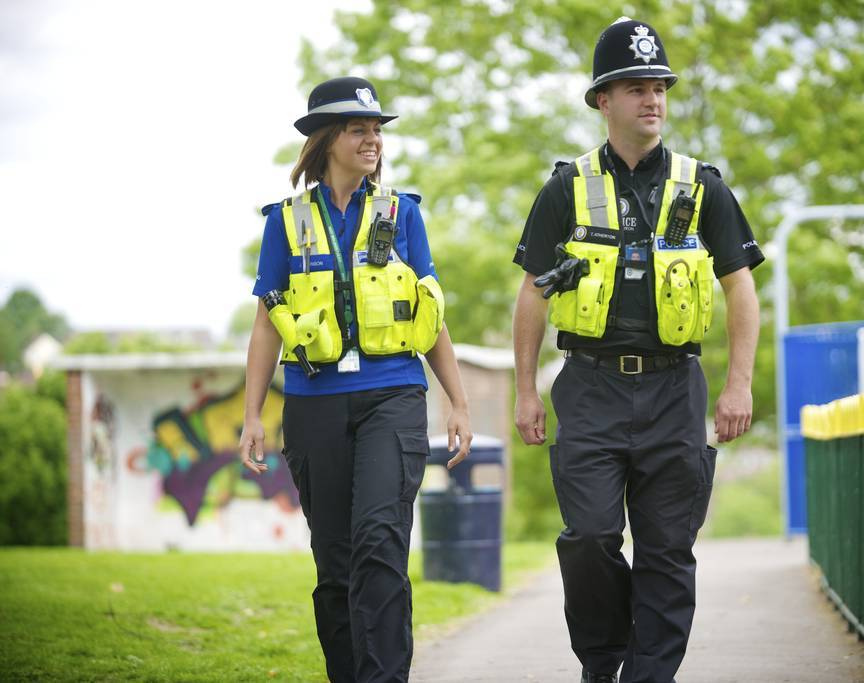
A West Midlands Police PCSO (left) on foot patrol with a constable (right)

Most PCSOs work within a Safer Neighbourhood team (SNT) or Neighbourhood Policing team (NPT) that contains special constables and beat managers (police sergeants). These teams are led by a neighbourhood inspector. Day-to-day duties usually include high visibility patrolling, tackling anti-social behaviour, dealing with minor offences, crowd control and directing traffic at public events, helping direct traffic at roadblocks or scenes of accidents, gathering criminal intelligence, and supporting front-line policing. The Home Office have specifically limited the powers designated to PCSOs to maintain the distinction between them and police officers. Some PCSOs are attached to Road Policing Units, and British Transport Police PCSOs are deployed as part of station teams. As with many aspects of PCSOs, the specifics of each job description vary depending on the relevant force.

== Recruitment selection and training ==
=== Recruitment and selection ===
Police forces will recruit PCSOs through adverts placed in newspapers and on the Internet and by posters in public places. Some may use open days as a method of attracting applicants which is the same way constables are recruited. The recruitment of PCSOs has helped some police forces increase the representation of ethnic minorities among their employees. Unlike with police constables, there is no set selection procedure for PCSOs and the process varies between forces although section 38 of the Police Reform Act 2002 (the law that made PCSOs) requires that chief constables or Commissioners in charge of police forces have a duty to ensure a recruit "is a suitable person to carry out the functions for the purposes of which they are designated" and is "capable of effectively carrying out those functions". Generally, PCSOs will be selected through a process that involves: an application form, interview and fitness tests; a medical test; and security and background vetting. Welsh PCSOs must have basic abilities to speak the Welsh language.

=== Training ===
Unlike police constables, there is no set training procedure for PCSOs so the training given varies from force to force although section 38 of the Police Reform Act 2002 (the law that made PCSOs) requires that chief constables or commissioners to ensure a recruit "Has received adequate training in the carrying out of those functions and in the exercise and performance of the powers and duties to be conferred on him by virtue of their designation". The original PCSOs recruited in 2002 by the Metropolitan Police received only 3 weeks' training, which was criticised as too little. The training period was eventually raised, and new Metropolitan Police PCSOs are now trained for six weeks. Training in other forces takes between four and eleven weeks, with the length of training depending on how close the PCSOs' authority comes to that of a regular police officer.

PCSOs are trained in a variety of tasks, including: radio procedure; report writing; dealing with evidence; going to court; gathering intelligence; managing a crime scene; usage of PCSO powers under the Police Reform Act 2002 and any person powers; use of force; human rights; race and diversity; traffic direction and cordon manning; general health and safety; self-defence (including restraint techniques and the use of handcuffs or leg restraints if used by their force); and first aid. Written examinations are usually performed during training. Upon successful completion of training, there may be a passing out parade.

After training a new PCSO is normally sent out on patrol with a tutor – usually an experienced PCSO – until they are able to patrol on their own. All PCSOs go through a twelve-month probationary period after completing training.

== Uniform and equipment ==
The uniform of a PCSO is similar to that of a police constable, but has a variety of uniquely distinguishing features depending on the wearer's respective force. As with a lot of things about PCSOs, their uniforms have a great deal of variation between police forces. The current ACPO guidance states that "PCSOs should be recognisable to the public as police staff, but visibly distinct from sworn police officers". Since PCSOs were first created in 2002, many forces have made changes to the uniforms issued. Most of these changes are commonly in regards to shirts, trousers and headgear.

=== Headgear ===
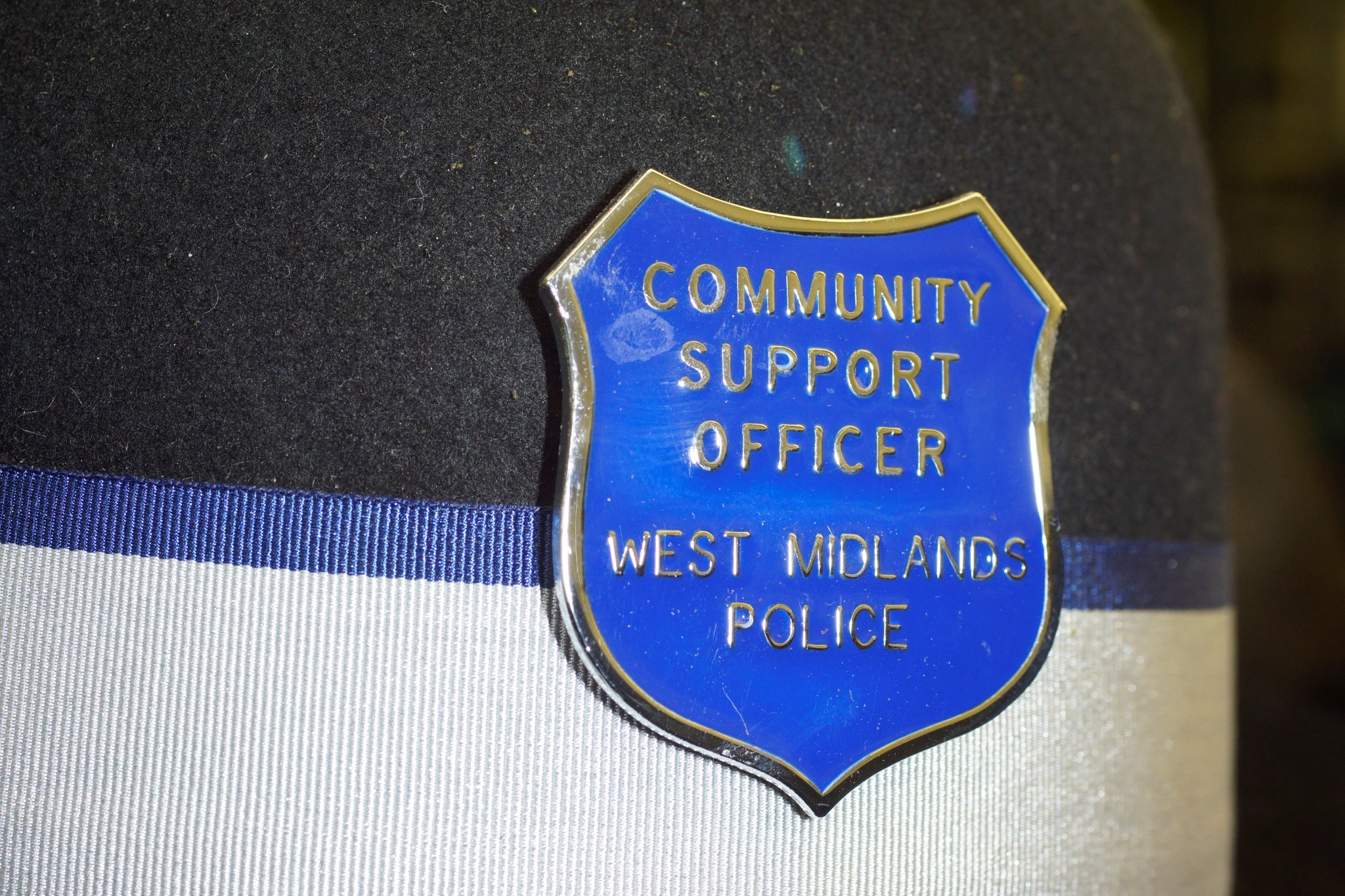
A metal shield, one of the different hat badge designs worn by PCSOs.

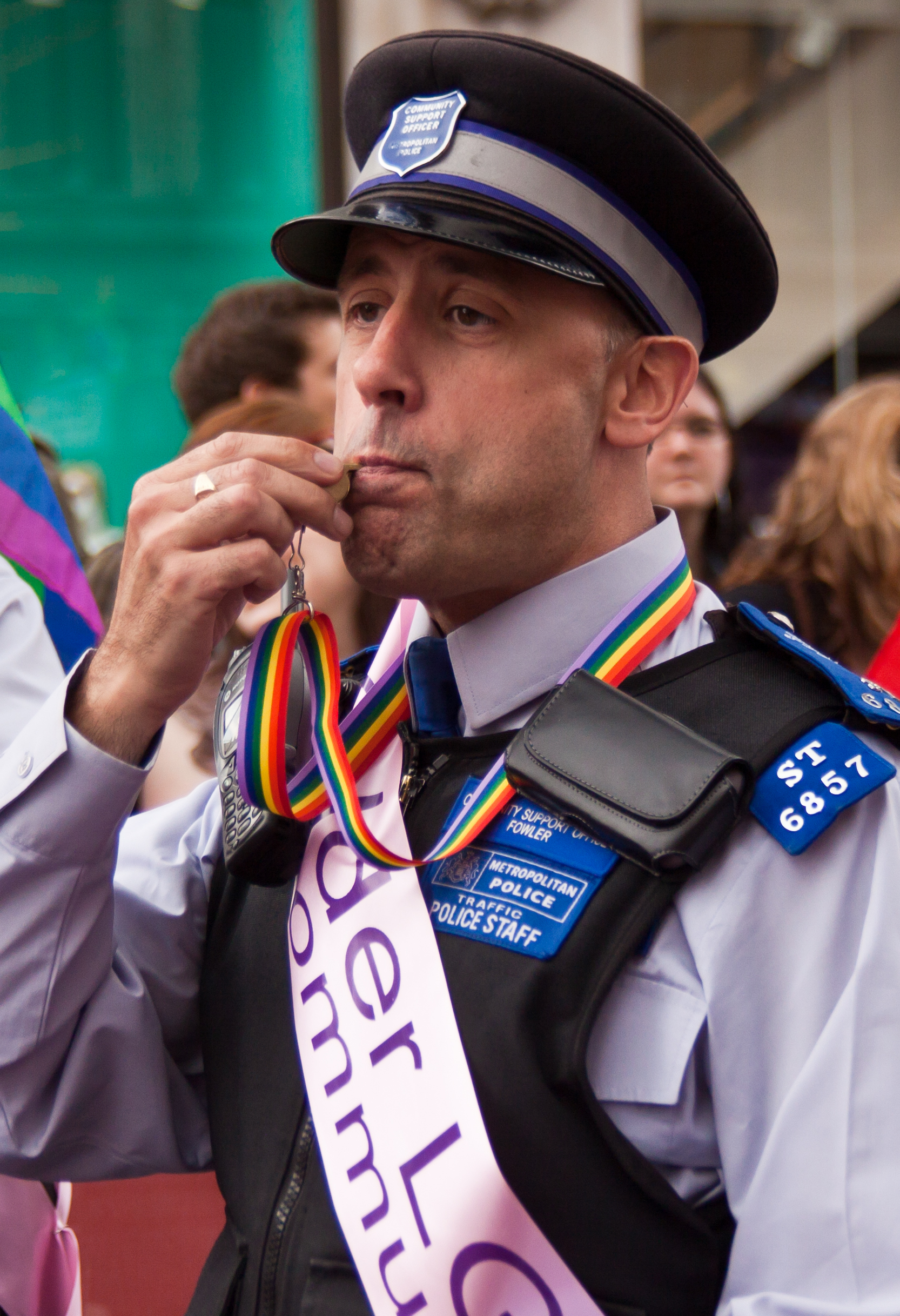
A PCSO of the Metropolitan Police on duty during the Pride London Parade, July 2011

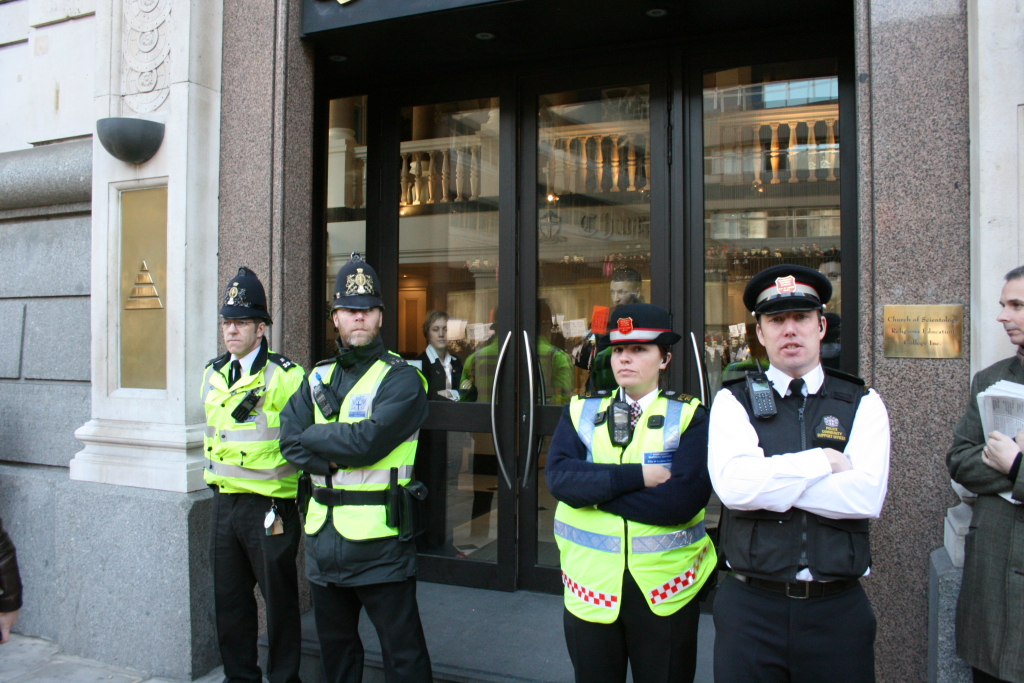
Two PCSOs (right) with two Police Constables of the City of London Police. Note the unique red edging of the reflective bands and the red shield badges on the headgear of the PCSOs.

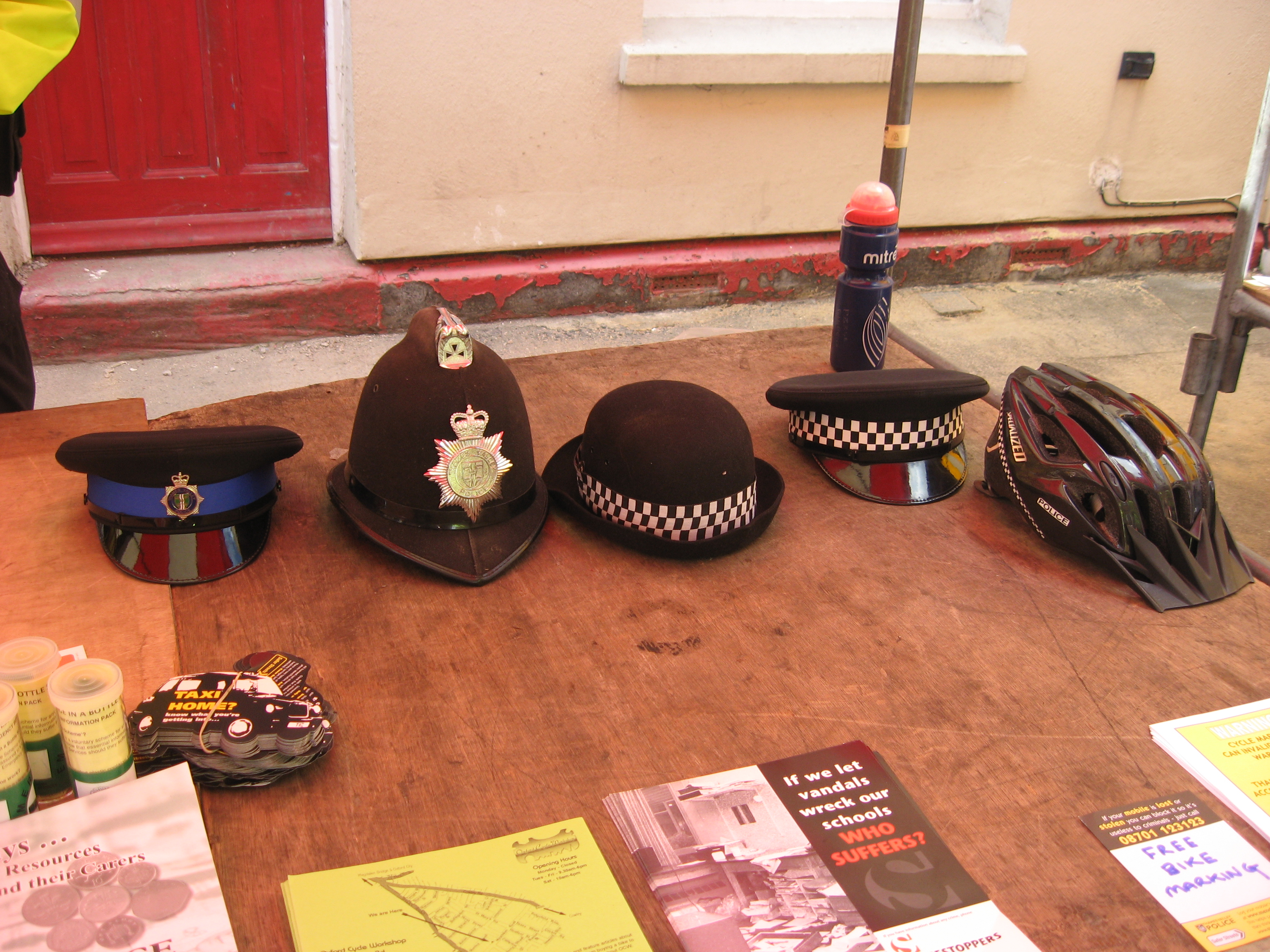
Types of headgear used by Thames Valley Police. From left: male PCSO flat cap, male PC custodian helmet, female PC bowler hat, male PC flat cap, cycle helmet.

A PCSO's headgear is normally a black formal peaked cap for men and a black bowler for women, although some forces are now opting for female PCSOs to wear the peaked cap. Headgear may or may not display the force crest, some have a metal shield, usually blue, stating "police community support officer" followed below with the name of the wearer's respective force in smaller letters. Some newer versions of such shields have the wearer's respective force crest printed on them. Most forces now simply issue the same hat badge that is issued to constables. The band on the hat is usually a silver reflective band with blue edging, a plain blue band, a chequered blue and silver band or a black and white Sillitoe tartan chequered band.

Male PCSOs wear flat, peaked caps rather than custodian helmets, which are worn by male police constables and sergeants. The Metropolitan Police Authority noted in 2004 that the hats worn by male PCSOs were not rigid and 'may therefore not offer adequate protection'. Female PCSOs wear bowler hats which contain foam padding as protection.

Some police forces have unique hat designs for PCSOs which are different from the more common styles, such as those worn by the City of London Police PCSOs who adhere to the force's tradition of red detailing, red banding, and a red shield. Another is Merseyside Police, whose PCSOs wear a blue band with green edging. The badge was formerly a black cloth patch bearing the words ‘Merseyside Police Community Support & Traffic Officer’. Merseyside PCSOs are now issued a metal force badge instead. North Wales Police (Welsh: Heddlu Gogledd Cymru) PCSOs wear black baseball caps with a blue band with "police support" written in both English and Welsh.

Surrey Police and Greater Manchester Police (GMP) give their Traffic PCSOs (who are part of GMP's Road Policing Unit (RPU)) white covered caps in the same style as traffic police officers. The hat retains though the standard blue band and force crest as other PCSOs in GMP.

=== Formal uniform ===
Generally, most forces do not have a formal uniform for their PCSOs, but a few provide tunics. Tunics are the same as that of a Police Constable but may have special badging to distinguish the wearer as a PCSO. As with police constables, PCSOs very rarely wear tunics (provided they have been given them). One of the few examples was during the funeral of PCSO Mark Marshall of Devon and Cornwall Police who was killed in Afghanistan whilst serving in the Territorial Army. His funeral was attended by police colleagues wearing tunics including PCSOs.

In 2012, PCSOs who had been in service since Monday 6 February 2012 and had completed five full calendar years in the role were awarded the Queen Elizabeth II Diamond Jubilee Medal. This is a commemorative medal created in 2011 to mark the 60th anniversary of the accession to the throne of Elizabeth II. PCSOs awarded the honour may wear the ribbon of the medal while on daily routine patrol. This medal was also given to police constables under similar rules. Gwent Police issued a silver coloured "Gwent Police Staff Diamond Jubilee Badge 2012", a small lapel badge awarded to all police constables and PCSOs who received the Jubilee Medal.

=== Operational uniform ===
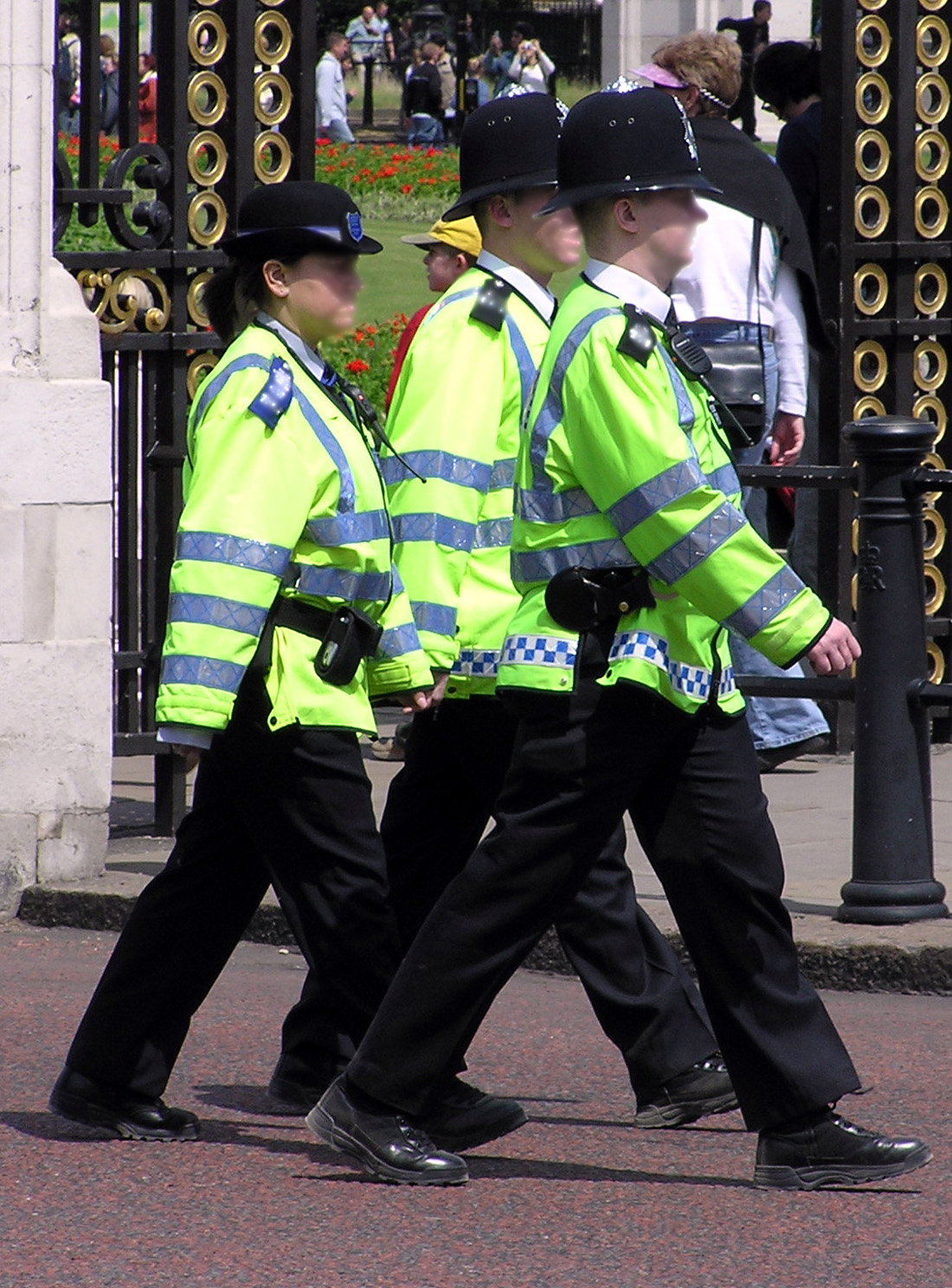
A female PCSO (Left) on duty with two police constables. Note the blue epaulettes and cap badge.

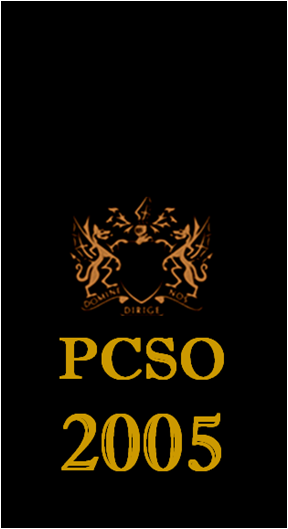
An example of the epaulettes worn by City of London Police PCSOs

Shirts for PCSOs are either white, blue or black. Originally the shirts were collared, ironed, smart and formal with two front pockets and radio loops but in recent years are being replaced in most forces with breathable shirts made to be worn with stab vests. Such new shirts unlike their predecessors are sometimes marked with "PCSO" or "police community support officer" on the sleeves or chest. North Wales Police now have the Welsh flag on both sleeves of their shirts, for both constables and PCSOs.

Neckwear, if worn, is a tie for men or a cravat for women. Neckwear is normally light blue, but is sometimes black. Some police forces issue name and/or number badges to its officers to be worn on their uniforms. PCSOs in such forces have "PCSO" or "police community support officer" written before their name or number. The badge is sometimes also differently coloured from the badge of regular police officers. Trousers are usually black or dark navy blue. Originally, these were ironed, smart and formal, but in recent years are being replaced in most forces with cargo pocketed designs to allow the PCSO to carry more items.

Body armour vests are issued to PCSOs – although originally not all forces did this – and wearing one is usually compulsory. Staffordshire Police was the last police force to issue Stab vests to PCSOs; they were only issued to officers of this force in April 2011. Some forces issue tactical vests to PCSOs that go over the body armour to provide alternative storage to a duty belt. The vest usually comes in black or hi-vis yellow.

Most PCSOs tend to wear blue epaulettes on their shoulders, although some forces use black epaulettes. Since 2009 a few forces began embroidering names on to epaulettes. PCSOs are issued with hi-visibility jackets and waterproof coats of varying design depending on the force. Officers may also be issued with a simple tabard for traffic duties. PCSOs wear nylon duty belts with quick release buckles to hold their equipment in pouches.

=== Cycle patrol uniform ===
Special uniforms exist in most forces for cycling for both PCSOs and constables. This typically consists of a cycling helmet, breathable cycling shirt and cargo cycling trousers. Hi-visibility jackets or vests are normally compulsory for cycling.

=== Equipment ===
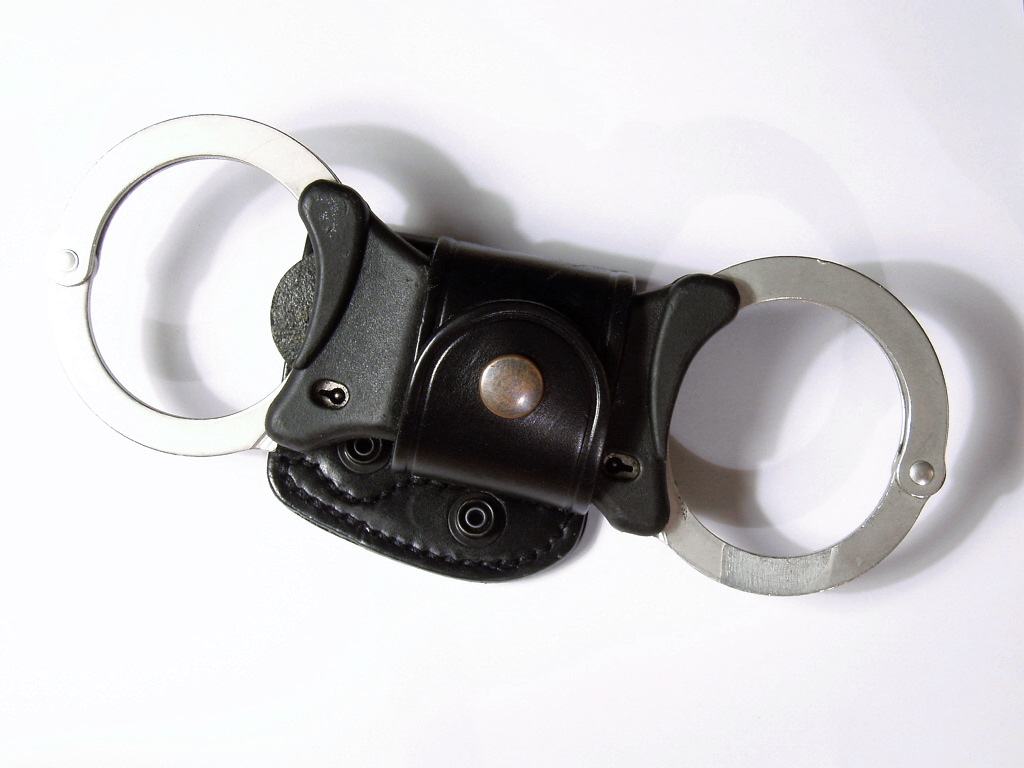
Speedcuffs in a leather pouch that are used by PCSOs of the British Transport Police, the Dyfed–Powys Police, and North Wales Police (Heddlu Gogledd Cymru) as well as most UK police constables

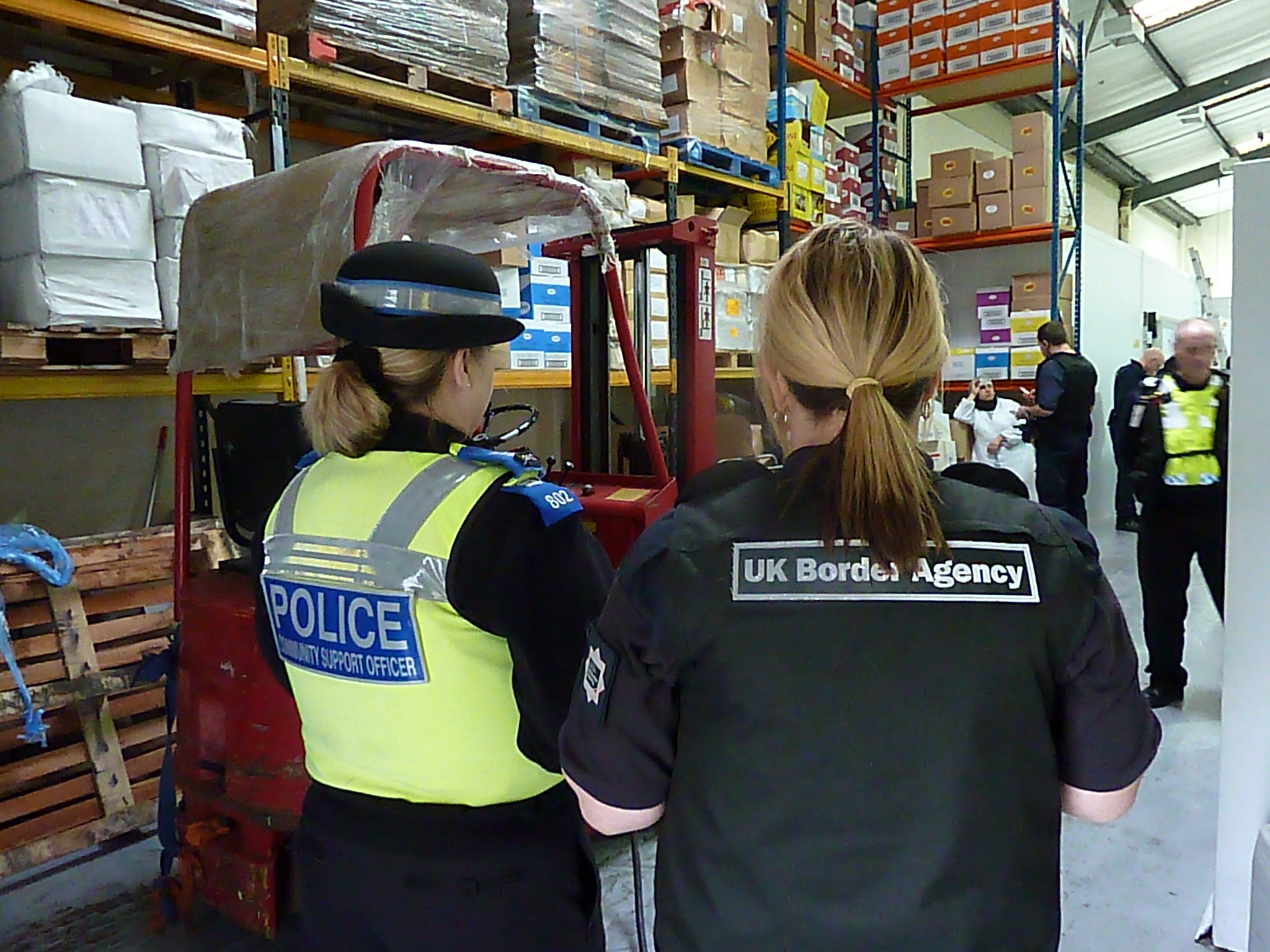
A PCSO (left) with a UK Border Agency (UKBA) officer (right) at a customs raid. Note the distinctive badging on the back of the PCSOs body armour as well the distinctive hat band (the most commonly used) and blue epaulettes (the most commonly used)

PCSOs use a police radio to communicate with other PCSOs, police officers and the control room on the same channel. Some neighbourhood police teams (NPT) or safer neighbourhood teams (SNT) also monitor local shop/pub watch radios. A body armour vest is issued to all PCSOs although in previous years some forces did not do this. Arrangements for use vary between forces, from compulsory use throughout shift, to officers' choice of use. Unlike constables, owing to the non-confrontational nature of their role, PCSOs are not normally issued with batons, incapacitant spray, handcuffs or leg restraints. However, PCSOs are authorised to carry and use this equipment. Four forces are an exception to this convention: British Transport Police PCSOs are issued with handcuffs and leg restraints; Also Dyfed-Powys Police, North Wales Police and Merseyside PCSOs are issued with handcuffs.

Forces such as South Wales Police also issue 'Biteback' dog spray.

Most police forces allow some PCSOs to use laser and radar guns to help enforce speed limits.

== Powers ==
PCSO powers vary between forces. The powers of PCSOs mainly stem from the Police Reform Act 2002, and every PCSO since 2007 has a number of standard powers that were introduced for all PCSOs regardless of which force they belong to. This is in addition to the discretionary powers that can be designated by the chief constable or commissioner of each PCSO's respective force. Before 2003, the British Transport Police was unable to have PCSOs until Section 28 of the Railways and Transport Safety Act 2003 allowed the BTP Chief Constable to recruit PCSOs and designate powers to them using the Police Reform Act 2002 – which previously only extended to chief constables or commissioners of territorial police forces.

PCSOs must adhere to certain standards. Failure to do so could result in disciplinary or criminal proceedings related to misfeasance in public office or malfeasance in public office. Leeway may be given depending on the situation, as the circumstances may dictate they do not have the training or equipment to deal with a situation like a constable could. It is also accepted that PCSOs do not have to intervene in high risk situations and it is reasonable if they decide to withdraw from one. This is due to the non-confrontational purpose of their role.

PCSOs are not attested constables, and therefore do not have the same powers of arrest under section 24 of the Police and Criminal Evidence Act 1984. They can, however, utilise the 'any person' powers of arrest under section 24A of the Police and Criminal Evidence Act 1984 (commonly known as a citizens' arrest). This means they are able to arrest anyone without warrant providing there are reasonable grounds to suspect they are committing, or have committed or are suspected to be guilty of an indictable or 'either-way' offence, provided the necessity criteria set out in statute are met. This covers offences such as arson, criminal damage, theft, assault, possession of a controlled drug and burglary, etc. All PCSOs can also make common law arrests in the same manner as civilians, to prevent a breach of the peace. They also have a power of entry.

Legislation exists that states that PCSOs are entitled to use reasonable force in order to effect an arrest as described above (under section 3 of the Criminal Law Act 1967), or to forcibly detain (using Police Reform Act 2002 powers) There is also a 'reasonable code of conduct' which is a legitimate and tested defence to a (technical) common assault of which the courts have accepted and has now been written into case law ( e.g. leading two disputing parties away from each other to prevent a fight – technically an assault as neither party has been arrested/detained at this point, but still considered otherwise lawful).

The term to detain (under the meaning of the Police Reform Act 2002) is a relatively new one, but under law, it is considered a temporary arrest (in accordance with Schedule 4, Part 1, Paragraph 2A(2)(b) of the Police Reform Act 2002). As a result, a PCSO may 'any person' arrest someone that he or she has reasonable grounds to suspect is attempting to escape from lawful custody when subject to a detention requirement (under Schedule 4, Part 1, Paragraph 2(3) of the Police Reform Act 2002). Section 38 Offences Against the Person Act 1861 also creates the offence of assault with intent to resist arrest, which also covers the "lawful apprehension/detention of himself or another". This is an either-way offence, meaning that the PCSO may also 'any person' arrest for this offence in addition to the original proposed detention.

In September 2018, Section 1 of the Assaults on Emergency Workers (Offences) Act 2018 created an either-way offence of any assault on any emergency worker, which includes PCSOs.

PCSOs may, subject to permission from their force, carry handcuffs and leg restraints which are both governed by the Criminal Law Act 1967 or common law and can be used in the same manner as a constable. They may use them for detaining or arresting a person using reasonable force under the powers listed. There are four forces at present whose PCSOs are currently carrying handcuffs (BTP, Dyfed-Powys Police, North Wales Police, Merseyside Police). PCSOs are also lawfully authorised to carry CS spray (which a normal civilian cannot do so pursuant to Section 5 of the Firearms Act 1968) and a baton when on duty, although none have yet been provided by any Chief Officer of any Police Force.

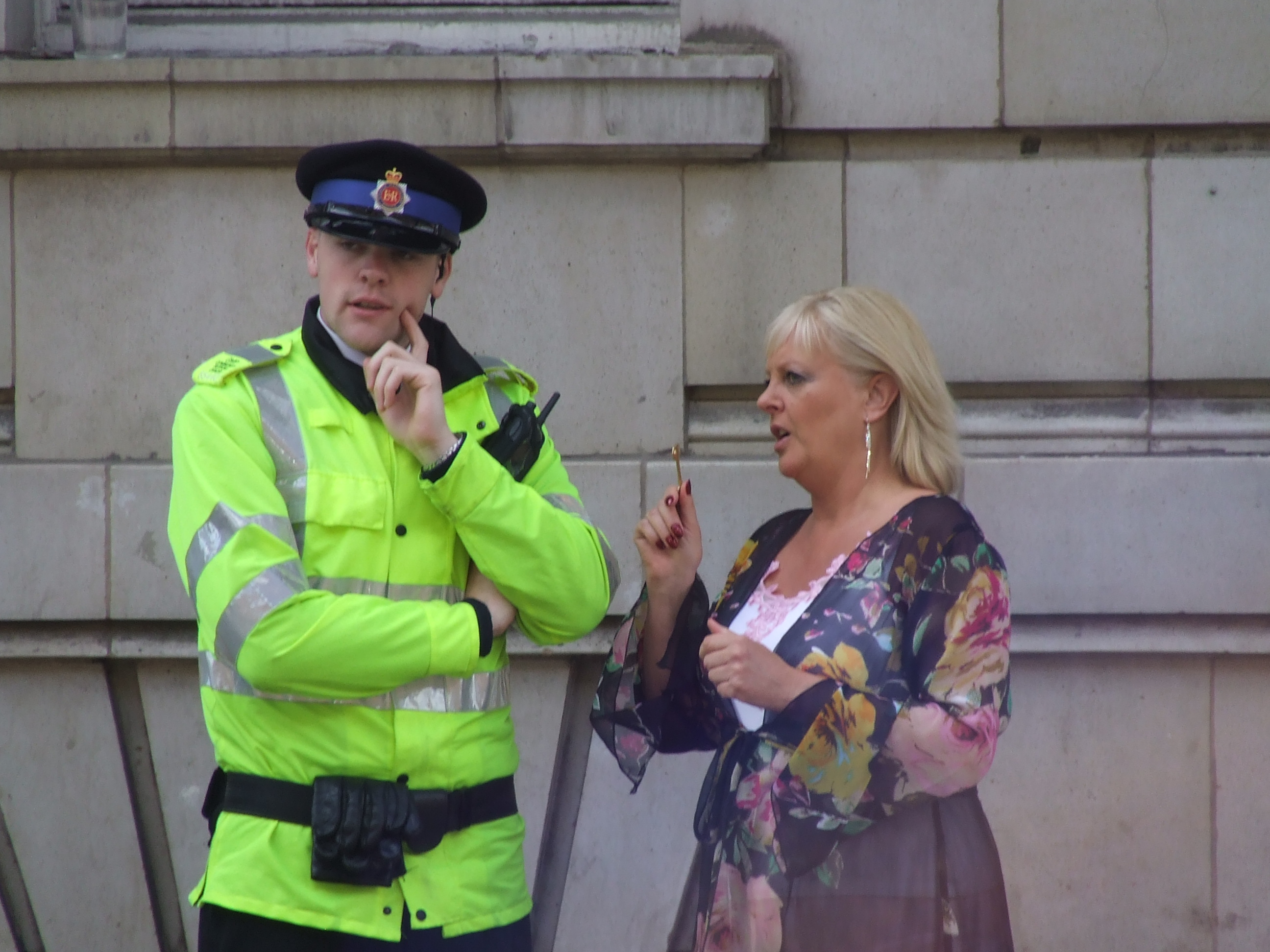
A PCSO of the Greater Manchester Police (GMP) talking to a member of the public whilst on duty. Note the plain blue band on his hat.

PCSOs have a number of other powers and abilities that they may exercise in the course of their duty:

- General power of a constable to seize property
- Issue fixed penalty notices (FPN) for littering, breach of dog control orders and cycling on a footpath
- Require name and address where they have reason to believe a person has committed a road traffic offence, a 'relevant offence', a licensing offence, an act of anti-social behaviour or is in possession of a controlled drug
- Confiscate alcohol from persons in designated places and from under 18s, or anyone considered involved in supplying under 18s with alcohol
- Seize and dispose of tobacco from under 18s
- Seize (controlled) drugs under the Misuse of Drugs Act 1971
- Enter and search premises to save life or prevent serious damage to property
- Seize vehicles used to cause alarm, distress or annoyance (s.59 Police Reform Act 2002)
- Remove abandoned vehicles
- Stop bicycles
- Control traffic
- Carry out road checks
- Place traffic signs
- Enforce cordoned areas under the Terrorism Act 2000
- Photograph people away from a police station
- Stop and search in an authorised area under the Terrorism Act 2000 if authorised and supervised by a police officer

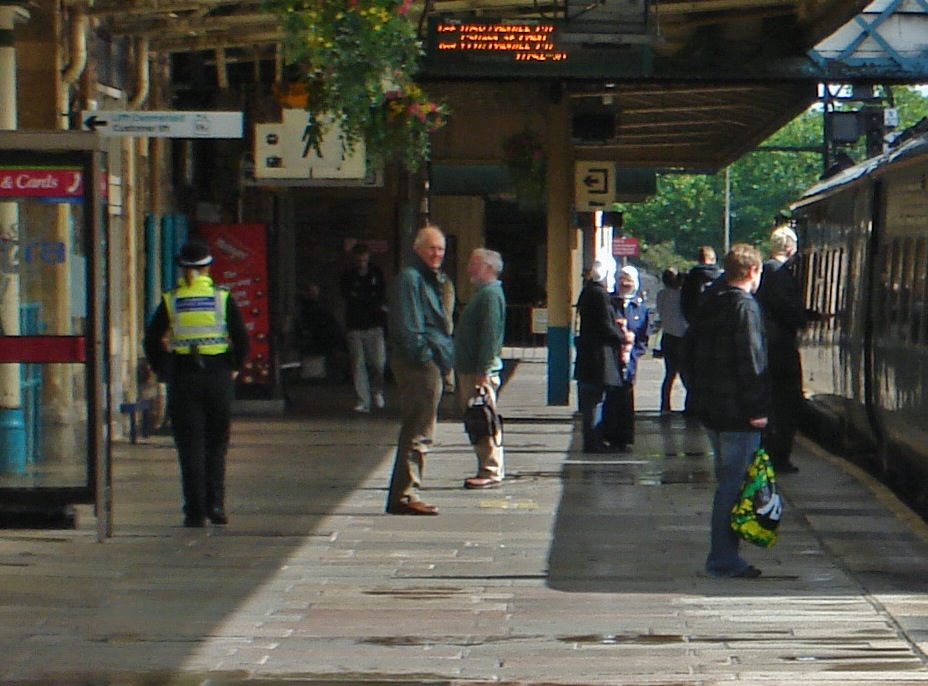
A PCSO of the British Transport Police on duty at Newport railway station

Certain additional powers which may be assigned to PCSOs by the chief constable (or commissioner in London), but which vary from force to force, include:

- Detain a person suspected to have committed an offence or an act of anti-social behaviour.
- Detain a person who does not provide their name and address when required
- Detain a person who fails to provide details or complies with orders of a PCSO.
- Use reasonable force in relation to a detained person or to prevent a detained person making off. This may involve the use of handcuffs and leg restraints if the PCSO has been issued with and authorised to use them.
- Issue penalty notices for disorder (PND), truancy, excluded pupils found in public places, dog fouling, graffiti and flyposting
- Power of a constable to issue an FPN under section 68 of the Anti-social Behaviour, Crime and Policing Act 2014 (fixed penalty notice in respect of failure to comply with public spaces protection order)
- Power to direct someone to leave a dispersal zone and/or seize property in relation to suspected ASB
- All the powers of a Traffic Warden
- Enforce bylaws
- Deal with begging. This involves requiring the person to stop begging as well as providing their name and address to the PCSO
- Enforce certain licensing offences
- Search detained people for dangerous items i.e. weapons and/or items that could effect an escape from the PCSO
- Disperse groups and remove under 16s to their place of residence
- Remove children contravening bans imposed by a curfew notice to their place of residence
- Remove truants to designated premises
- Search for alcohol and tobacco
- Enforce park trading offences
- Enter licensed premises (limited)
- Stop vehicles for testing
- Direct traffic for the purposes of escorting abnormal loads
- Deal with parking offences including giving fines

Individual chief constables or commissioners can increase the discretionary powers their PCSOs use from the existing list.

PCSO powers were further increased by the Anti-social Behaviour, Crime and Policing Act 2014 statute. This provided them with powers such as the power of a constable under Section 19 of PACE to seize any suspected criminal property or property suspected of being used in crime and further traffic FPN powers.

The Policing and Crime Act 2017 set out dramatic expansions to the role of PCSO. Section 28(4)(a) states a PCSO will be able to be designated with "any power or duty of a constable (other than a power or duty specified in Part 1 of Schedule 3B excluded powers and duties)". These excluded powers would be:

- Any power or duty of a constable to make an arrest under s24 PACE 1984 (note: this does not limit the use of s24A PACE powers)
- Any power or duty of a constable to stop and search an individual or a vehicle or other thing
- The power of a constable, under section 36(4) of the Police and Criminal Evidence Act 1984, to perform the functions of a custody officer at a designated police station if a custody officer is not readily available to perform them
- Any power that is exercisable only by a constable of a particular rank
- Any power of a constable under (a) the Terrorism Act 2000; (b)the Terrorism Act 2006; (c)the Counter-Terrorism Act 2008; (d)the Terrorism Prevention and Investigation Measures Act 2011; (e)the Counter-Terrorism and Security Act 2015
- Any power of a constable under the Official Secrets Act 1911 to 1989
- The power of a constable to make an application on behalf of the Commissioner of Police of the Metropolis under section 6 of the Regulation of Investigatory Powers Act 2000 (applications for interception warrants)

This bill received Royal Assent on 31 January 2017 and was subsequently passed into law.

== Use of force ==
Under a mix of legislation and common law, a PCSO can use reasonable force to arrest or detain a suspected offender. PCSOs can all use handcuffs (if their force provides them) to detain using their own detention powers or arrest using 'any person' powers when on duty. At present only four forces issue handcuffs officially.

The use of reasonable force is provided by s3 Criminal Law Act 1967, the Common Law and the Human Rights Act 1998. Reasonable force is further provided to PCSOs under Section 38(8) Police Reform Act 2002 when using a power which – in the same circumstances – would also be a power available to a Constable.

== Relevant offences ==
The following are criminal offences in relation to PCSOs under the Police Reform Act 2002 for which a PCSO can detain, or a police constable can arrest for:

- Assaulting a PCSO during the course of his/her duty
- Assaulting an individual assisting a PCSO during the course of his/her duty
- Wilfully obstructing or resisting a PCSO during the course of his/her duty
- Failing to provide personal details upon request to a PCSO
- Failing to provide correct personal details upon request to a PCSO ('makes off')
- Having provided false personal details upon request to a PCSO ('makes off')
- Acting in an anti-social manner; failure to give name/address to PCSO
- Acting in an anti-social manner; 'makes off' whilst detained
- Acting in an anti-social manner; 'makes off' whilst detained & fails to provide name/address to a PCSO
- Acting in an anti-social manner; 'makes off' whilst accompanying PCSO to a police station
- Contravening a PCSO's requirement to hand over alcohol
- Contravening a PCSO's requirement to surrender tobacco
- Failure to stop a vehicle as directed by a PCSO
- Impersonating a PCSO
- The common assault (indictable) of an emergency worker (PCSO) under Section 1 Assaults on Emergency Workers (Offences) Act 2018.

It is also an offence for a PCSO to imply that they have a power that they are not designated by their chief constable or commissioner.

This list is not exhaustive.

This list comes from definitions provided under paragraph 2(3) of Schedule 5 of the Police Reform Act 2002.

== Organisation ==
=== Rank structure ===
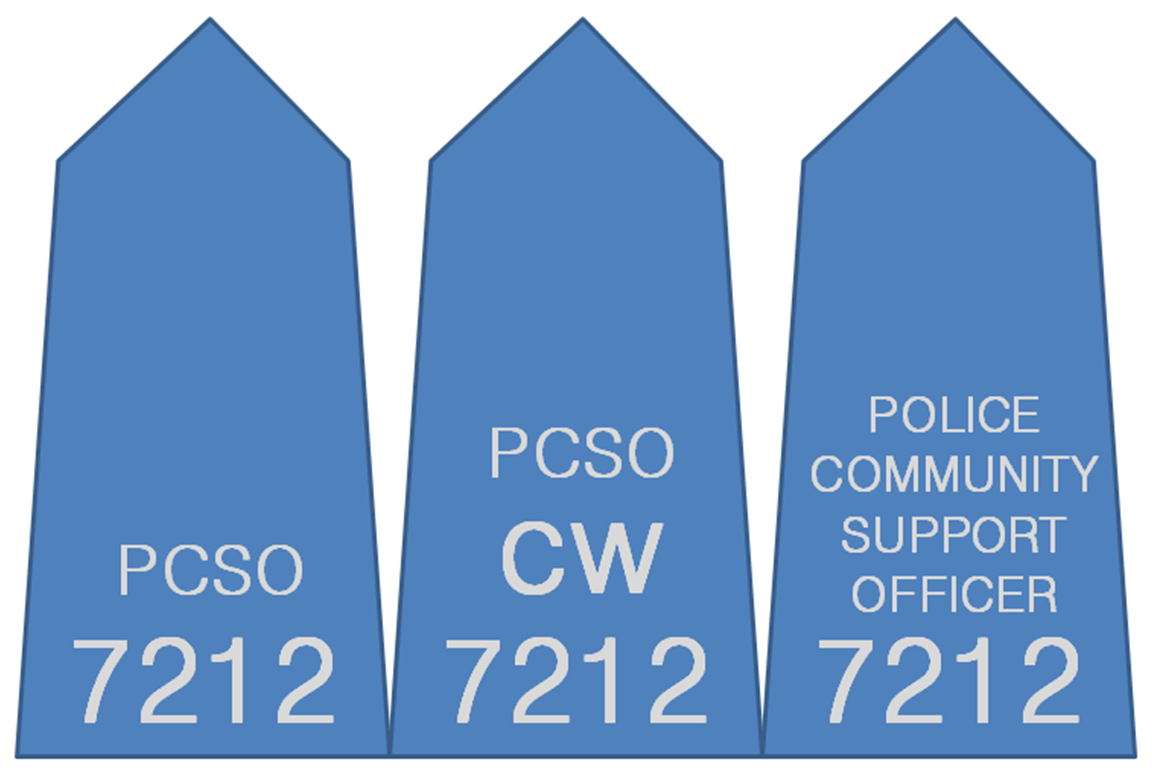
Variations of PCSO epaulettes varying between forces

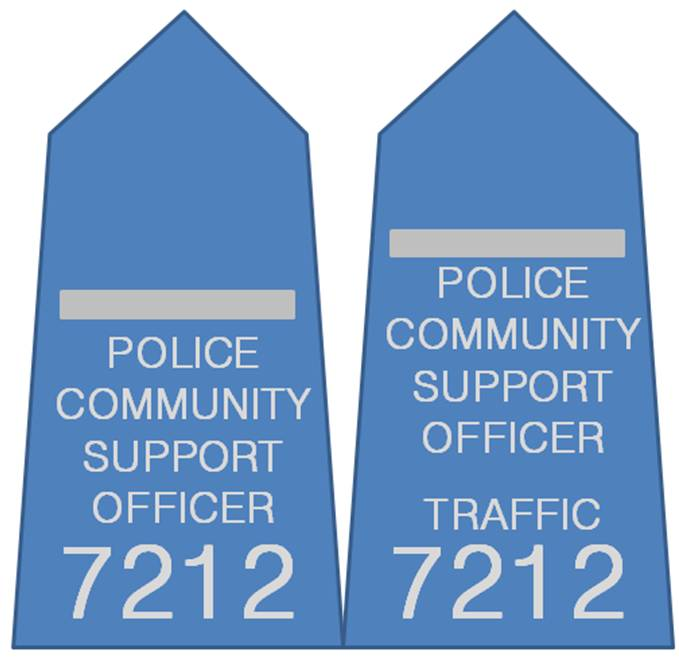
Examples of PCSO supervisor epaulettes

PCSOs do not normally have a rank system; however, South Yorkshire and Kent Police employ PCSO supervisors. The South Yorkshire epaulettes have a 'bar' above the wording "Police Community Support Officer Supervisor – Traffic" with the shoulder number beneath. PCSO supervisors only supervise PCSOs and normally work under a police sergeant.

Avon and Somerset Police currently utilise a PCSO Support role, which is an administration position allowing PCSOs to continue to meet the criteria; primarily subsection three of The Policing Pledge of 2009; to conduct high visibility patrols and spend at least eighty per cent of their tour of duty on patrol within the community. PCSOs are a civilianised non-uniform role, who deal mainly with the administration side of the Neighbourhood Policing Team (NPT).

Although not a rank in itself, most forces have an official system of putting newly trained PCSOs on their probation with a PCSO tutor. A PCSO tutor is normally an experienced PCSO, sometimes with additional training, who will patrol with the new PCSO until he or she is ready to patrol alone. Whilst being tutored like a probationary police constable the new PCSO may have a number of tasks to complete whilst on patrol and will complete such tasks whilst being mentored by the PCSO tutor.

=== Roles in the Metropolitan Police ===
PCSO duties can vary from force to force. Many forces may officially have different roles for PCSOs in which special training and sometimes equipment is given. Within the Metropolitan Police, which is responsible for law enforcement in Greater London, several different types of PCSO exist

- Safer Neighbourhoods PCSO – Provides a uniformed presence in Safer Neighbourhood Teams, which police London's boroughs and other areas within the MPS district.
- Safer Transport PCSO – Provides a uniformed presence on buses (policing on the railways and London Underground being provided by the British Transport Police.)
- Traffic PCSO – Provides a uniformed presence by assisting the Traffic OCU in roads policing, along with issuing penalty notices.
- Counter Terrorism PCSO (known prior to 2010 as a Security PCSO) provide a uniformed presence in well known areas in London, safeguarding against terrorism.
- Royal Parks PCSO – Provides a uniformed presence within the Royal Parks in the MPS District.
- Aviation Security PCSO – Provides a uniformed presence, assisting the Aviation Security OCU in policing of London airports.
- Station PCSO – Acts as front counter liaison with members of the public.
- Victim PCSO – Responsible for updating victims of crime about police investigations.
- Safer Schools PCSO – Provides a visible familiar police presence in local schools, tackling local school and student issues. This role was disbanded in 2012 leaving only Safer Schools police officers (SSOs)in the role.

== Vehicles ==
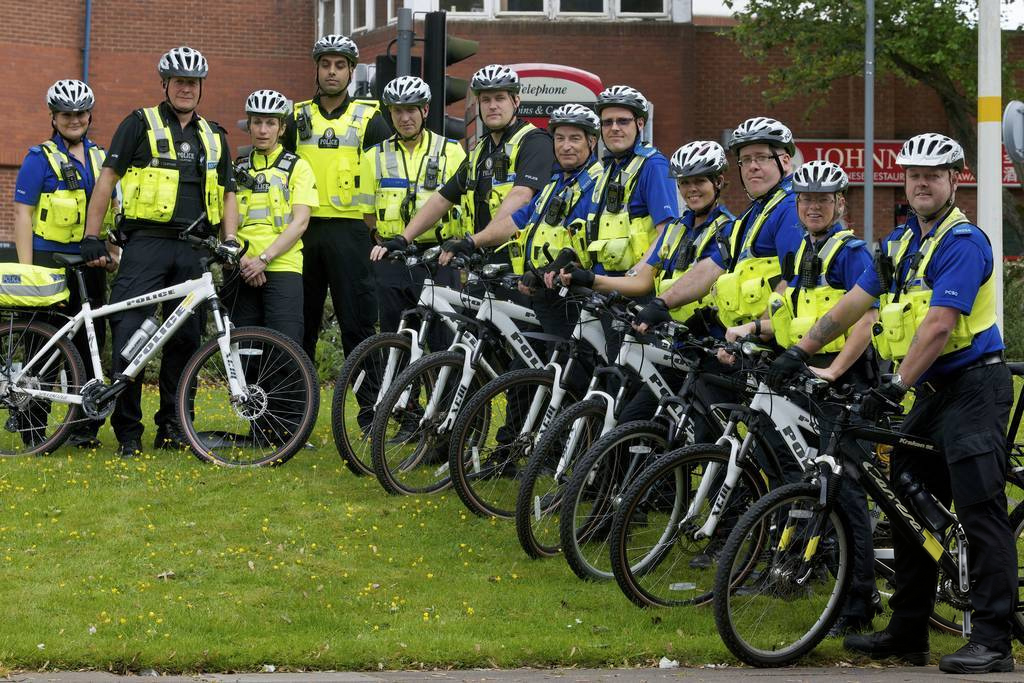
Police constables and PCSOs on pedal cycles. Note the PCSOs' distinctive blue shirts

Most forces allow their PCSOs, commonly those assigned to duties managing traffic, to drive marked police vehicles. PCSOs may only use blue lights when they come across an accident to indicate the danger present to members of the public, to alert the public to a road hazard and when asked to by a Senior Officer.

PCSOs also regularly use mountain bikes or other bicycles. Since 2007, PCSOs and police constables have had to take a training course before being allowed to use bicycles whilst on duty, after a trainee PCSO died after being hit by a truck in Wigan.

In 2007, Segways were reported to be used by Metropolitan Police Safer Neighbourhood Teams (SNT) in Sutton. These teams consist mostly of PCSOs.

== Underage PCSOs ==
In 2007, it was revealed that some forces recruited a number of PCSOs under the legal recruitment age for police constables, which was 18 years and 6 months. The criterion seemed to be that such recruits must be at least 16 and their appointment must have been authorised by the chief constable of the force being applied to. One such officer of the Thames Valley Police Force, 17-year-old PCSO Nadia Naeem, made news. The decision to appoint her and other 16- and 17-year-olds has been the subject of much debate.

On 26 November 2007, the then-Home Secretary, Jacqui Smith, made the decision that from December 2007, all PCSOs must be 18 before they can be appointed. PCSOs under 18 years who were already appointed, or had applied prior to this ruling, were allowed to keep their positions.

A few police forces including West Midlands Police, Cumbria Constabulary and the British Transport Police are accepting applications from candidates below 18 years owing to the lengthy recruitment process. Candidates will, therefore, be able to begin training upon reaching the required age.

== Deaths on duty ==
Since their introduction in 2002, three PCSOs have died on duty:

- 31 January 2006, PCSO Adrian Martin, aged 45 – Metropolitan Police: Collapsed and died of heart failure while on a police cycle training course at Hendon Police College. He was the first PCSO to die on duty.
- 10 September 2007, PCSO Christopher Maclure, aged 21 – Greater Manchester Police (GMP): Died whilst on cycle patrol in Hindley Green Wigan when he was accidentally struck by a lorry. As a result of his death, safety was improved nationally for officers deployed on cycles. An award for GMP PCSOs the 'PCSO Christopher McClure Memorial Award for Outstanding Contribution to the Community' was made in his honour.
- 28 April 2009, PCSO David Leslie Adams, aged 59 – Avon and Somerset Constabulary: Died of a suspected heart attack whilst attending a road traffic collision whilst on duty in Woolverton near Frome. PCSO Adams had previously been a traffic warden with his force before becoming one of the constabulary's first PCSOs. During his service he won an award in 2007 for outstanding customer service in the Somerset East District at the Avon and Somerset Community Police Awards.

The Police Roll of Honour Trust includes PCSOs in its roll of fallen officers alongside constables providing they die in operational circumstances (i.e., in the performance of a law enforcement role, including patrol).

== Union and Police Federation membership status ==
PCSOs cannot by law be members of the Police Federation, the staff association to which, by statute, all regular police officers from the rank of Police Constable to that of Chief Inspector belong. Police officers cannot by law join any trade union, but as designated, unsworn, unwarranted officers, PCSOs can, despite being employed by the Police. Most PCSOs belong to UNISON. But other PCSOs are represented by PCS – Public and Commercial Services Union for PCSOs in the Metropolitan Police and TSSA – Transport Salaried Staffs' Association who represent PCSOs in the British Transport Police (BTP).

Unlike police constables, PCSOs can strike. This has occurred during the 2011 Public Sector Workers strike, which was partaken in by some PCSOs. Police constables, on the other hand, cannot legally strike as a result of the Police Act 1996, although they have not been able to strike since 1919 when it was first outlawed. Police Acts do not apply to PCSOs.

== Special constable membership status ==
Unlike other civilians employed by the police, PCSOs are usually not Special Constables, as this may cause confusion with their PCSO role, since Specials have the same powers as paid police constables. Any PCSO wishing to become a Special Constable would usually be required to resign and the same would apply for any Special Constable wanting to be a PCSO.

== Future ==
It was expected that the Conservative Party might remove PCSOs in early 2010. It has been reported by the Daily Telegraph that under the Conservatives, police chiefs will no longer be given a fixed amount of money to spend only on PCSOs. Before the 2010 General Election the then Shadow Home Secretary Chris Grayling was understood to be doubtful of the effectiveness of PCSOs and was concerned that a disproportionate number of them were disciplined in 2009. He stated he would leave it up to individual chief constables to decide whether their particular police force needs PCSOs. However, when interviewed by the Yorkshire Post in May 2009 he suggested that the Conservative Party may well scrap PCSOs altogether.

Since the 2010 general election held on 6 May 2010, which resulted in a Conservative Party led coalition government coming to power, no police force has disbanded or announced the disbanding of its PCSOs, and many forces have continued to recruit PCSOs after the 2010 election. Such forces include Durham Constabulary in December 2011 and British Transport Police (BTP) in June 2011. BTP in 2012 have decided to increase their overall numbers of PCSOs. The Metropolitan Police in February 2012 undertook a recruitment campaign to employ around 1000 additional PCSOs.

Chris Grayling, who was possibly considering reducing or disbanding PCSOs, was not made Home Secretary after the 2010 general election. Instead, he was appointed Minister of State at the Department for Work and Pensions.

In April 2012 Home Secretary Theresa May told a Home Affairs Select Committee she would leave PCSO funding and numbers to individual police forces although she did not announce any all-out plans to disband them.

During the England and Wales Police and Crime Commissioner elections, 2012 the UK Independence Party (UKIP) Candidate for the post of police and crime commissioner (PCC) for Norfolk Constabulary Matthew Smith stated he was doubtful of the effectiveness of PCSOs and wanted to reduce their numbers claiming during a debate on BBC Radio Norfolk in the run up to the election that the public in his opinion were not happy with PCSOs seeing them as "Plastic Policemen" During his campaign to be the PCC he stated he would prioritise recruitment to have more Police Constables and Special Constables rather than PCSOs.

All other PCC candidates for Norfolk Constabulary defended PCSOs and their role in the debate. The election for PCCs Matthew Smith is the only known candidate during the England and Wales Police and Crime Commissioner elections, 2012 who planned to reduce PCSO numbers. Although later in 2018 Norfolk Constabulary abolished its use of PCSOs and made all of its remaining PCSOs redundant.

== Similar programmes in other countries ==
Several countries have copied or already have law enforcement positions that are similar to PCSOs in England and Wales. In some cases they take the form or are employed by Municipal Police. Municipal police are forces under the control of localised municipalities, which are other countries' versions of British local authorities or councils.

=== Australia ===
In Australia, most police forces have an equivalent role known as a PSO, standing variously for Protective Services Officer (Victoria Police), Protective Service Officer (Western Australia Police and Australian Federal Police), Police Security Officer (South Australia Police) or Protective Security Officer (Queensland Police). Except in Victoria, they are not sworn constables and have limited powers. At a federal level, the Australian Protective Service operated from 1984 until 2004, when it was re-integrated into the AFP and currently serves a primary role in policing Parliament House in Canberra, major airports, and certain diplomatic and defence installations.

In the state of Victoria, Protective Services Officers are sworn members of Victoria Police. PSOs attached to the Protective Services Unit (PSU) perform duties as guards at state Parliament, at the Shrine of Remembrance and at court premises throughout the state. PSOs attached to the Transit Safety Division (Transit PSOs) perform policing duties at all metropolitan and some regional railway premises throughout Victoria. Unlike PSOs assigned to the PSU, Transit PSOs possess almost full police powers while on duty and within the vicinity of railway premises. They are identified by the use of blue-and-gold Sillitoe tartan rather than blue-and-white and the text "PROTECTIVE SERVICES" on badges. All PSOs carry a firearm, ballistic body armour and all other personal equipment issued to police officers throughout Victoria. and pepper spray.

Queensland Police have Police Liaison Officers, members of staff employed by the police to keep links between the police and the local ethnic minority groups normally distant from the police such as Australia's Aboriginal peoples, Asian groups and African communities. They wear the same blue uniform as Queensland Police officers, but have features on them to distinguish them such as yellow or blue/green epaulettes. They have no police powers and do not carry any weapons or accoutrements.

The Western Australia Police have Police Auxiliary Officers, members of staff who are employed to support WA Police Officers through the admission, custody and release of detainees in the Perth Watch House and other station based lock-ups. Other duties include managing and handling drugs and firearms, processing property and exhibits and a range of station support tasks. They wear maroon epaulettes and are not authorised to carry or use firearms; however, they do carry telescopic batons, handcuffs, oleoresin capsicum (OC) spray and Tasers. They have limited police powers and training lasts only 12 weeks.

=== Belgium ===
In Belgium, Police Agents (Dutch: Aspirant-Agents) serve at both the federal and local level. These uniformed Police Agents who have limited police powers to enforce traffic, parking and public nuisance laws.

Unlike Belgian Police Officers, Police Agents are unarmed but are equipped with handcuffs. They were originally known as "Auxiliary Officers".

=== Canada ===
The Royal Canadian Mounted Police launched a Community Safety Officer (CSO) (French: Agent de Sécurité Communautaire, (ASC)) programme based on the model in England and Wales. CSOs are given the title "Special Constable". The first seventeen CSOs were sworn in on 16 June 2008 as part of a pilot programme, which lasted eighteen months. They did not carry pistols like fully powered officers in the RCMP, but they did carry handcuffs, pepper sprays and batons to protect themselves. The programmed disbanded in 2014 with a new program known as "Community Constables".

In addition, many municipalities across Canada also employ a Municipal Bylaw Enforcement Officer or a number of them, to enforce municipal by-laws and some provincial laws regulating dangerous canines, tobacco use and motor vehicle traffic. Many Municipal Bylaw Enforcement Officers wear uniforms and some are issued batons and handcuffs. Municipal Bylaw Enforcement Officers are employed by the Municipality; however, some are directly by employed by police departments such as in Medicine Hat, Alberta and Toronto, Ontario.

=== France ===
French municipalities utilise officers called ASVP or Public Roads Control Officer (French: Agents De Surveillance De La Voie Publique), who are not armed but carry handcuffs and utilise powers of arrest.

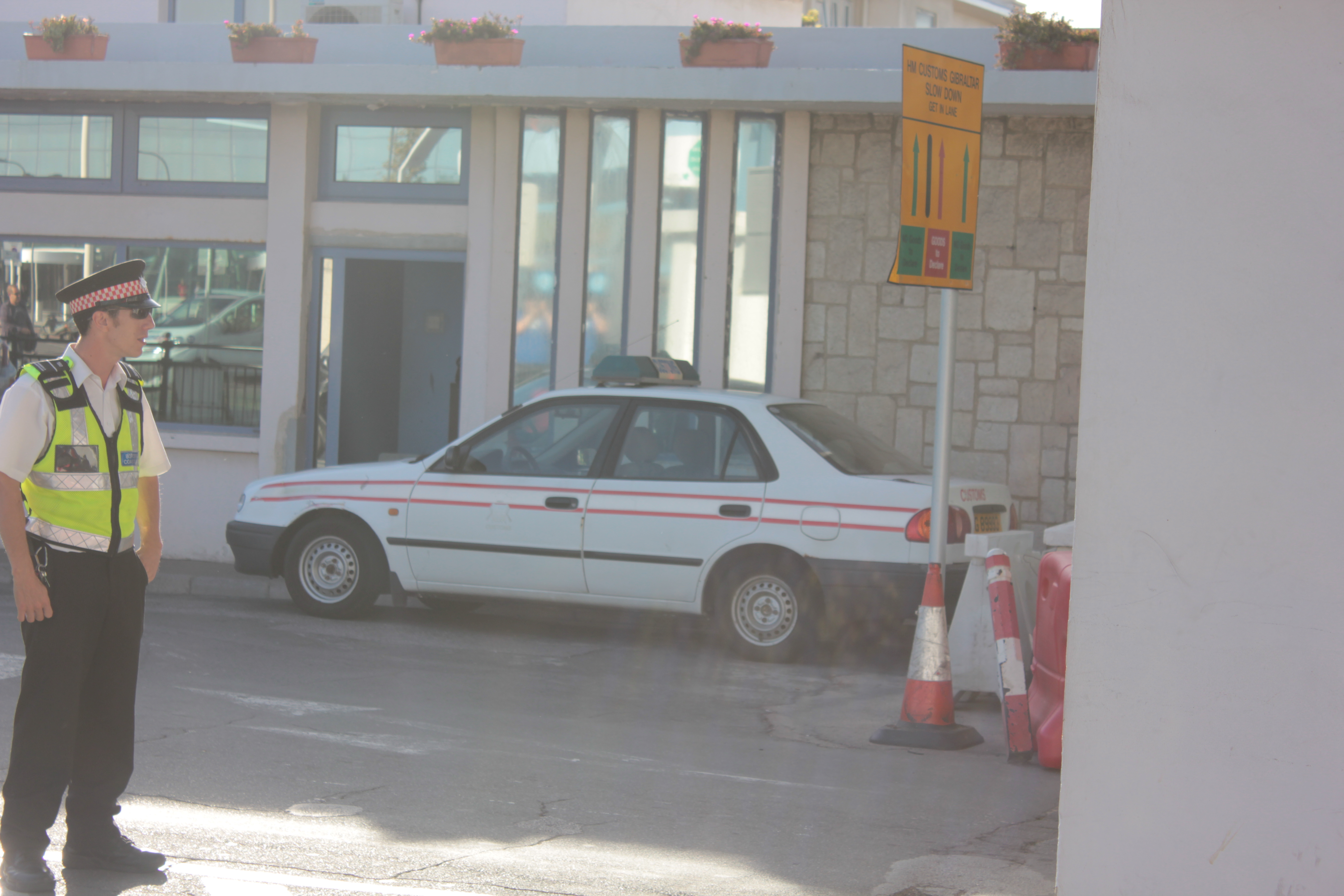
A Gibraltar Highways Enforcement Officer on patrol near the Spanish border

=== Gibraltar ===
In the British Overseas Territory of Gibraltar, Highways Enforcement Officers are employed by Gibraltar Car Parks Limited, a wholly owned Government Company of Her Majesty's Government of Gibraltar. Like mainland British PCSOs they undertake uniformed patrols. They perform a very similar role to that of mainland British Traffic PCSO that various forces used to replace their Traffic Wardens (notably the Metropolitan Police). Unlike British PCSOs they are not employed by the Royal Gibraltar Police. As well as performing parking enforcement including the issuing of fines they also look after government owned car parks, look out for deficiencies in the public highways and enforce litter control laws including giving fines or summoning offenders. They are paid £20,325 rising to £24,345 per year subject to satisfactory performance, plus a 12.5% shift disturbance allowance and weekend premium.

=== Germany ===
In Germany, several agencies provide similar services like the PCSO:

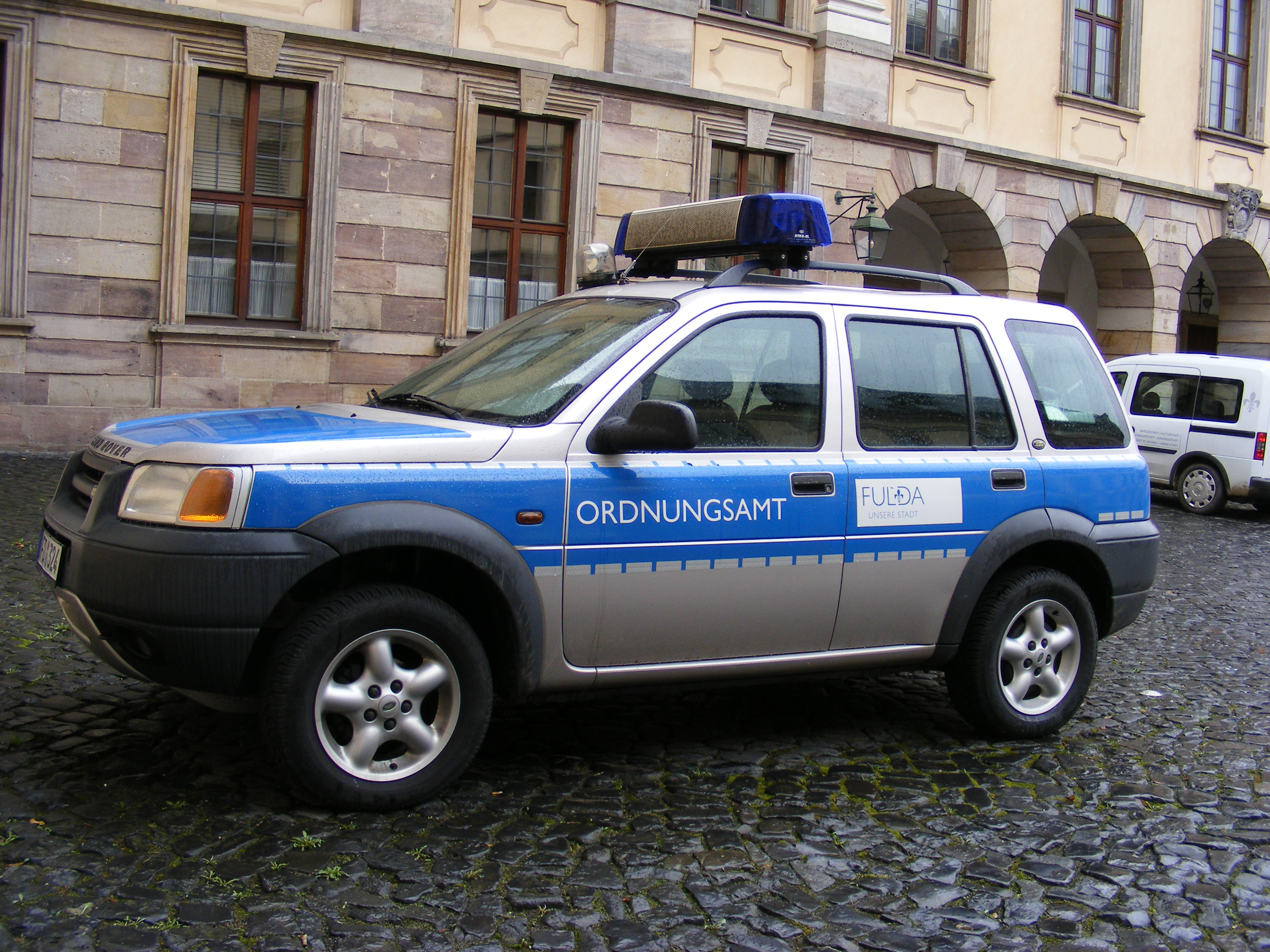
Patrol car of the Ordnungsamt of the city of Fulda

Auxiliary police
some states established auxiliary police units as Voluntary Police Force (Freiwilliger Polizeidienst), Security Watch (Sicherheitswacht) or Security Partner (Sicherheitspartner). These services are intended to maintain or establish public security and order throughout their assigned territories.

City police forces
(Stadtpolizei, Kommunalpolizei or Polizeibehörde) exist in few states like Bremen, Saarland, Baden-Württemberg and Hesse. Those municipal police officers do have the same rights, powers and obligations like their counterparts in the state police, but are employed by German municipalities.

Municipal order enforcement agencies
depending on state laws and municipal regulations, they are named Kommunaler Ordnungsdienst (KOD) or Ordnungsamt. These city employees mainly wear police-like uniforms but some wear labelled jackets and plain clothes. They are the municipal administration's eyes and ears on the street. Depending on each state's laws, these local employees could be armed or unarmed. Mostly they are charged with monitoring municipal by-laws and laws that fall under the responsibility of municipalities, which include monitoring the conduct of shop owners, sanitation inspections, veterinary inspections and minor infractions and misdemeanors such as illegal parking, littering, state and local dog regulations etc. They usually only hand out warnings and fines and can only perform a citizen's arrest as any other citizen can. If they see any major crimes they are required to call the state police. They usually hand out warnings and fines. Like British PCSOs, they have special powers of detention and can perform arrests.

=== India ===
In India the federal states determine the individual policing roles that can be handed over to volunteers. In the state of West Bengal, after 2012, around 120,000 personnel were inducted as contractual 'Civic Volunteers' to assist the police with minor law and order duties like traffic management, managing helpdesks, crowd control etc. There have been several debates about the recrtuiment, training and usefulness of these volunteers. Several civic volunteers have been accused of excesses and crimes.

=== Poland ===
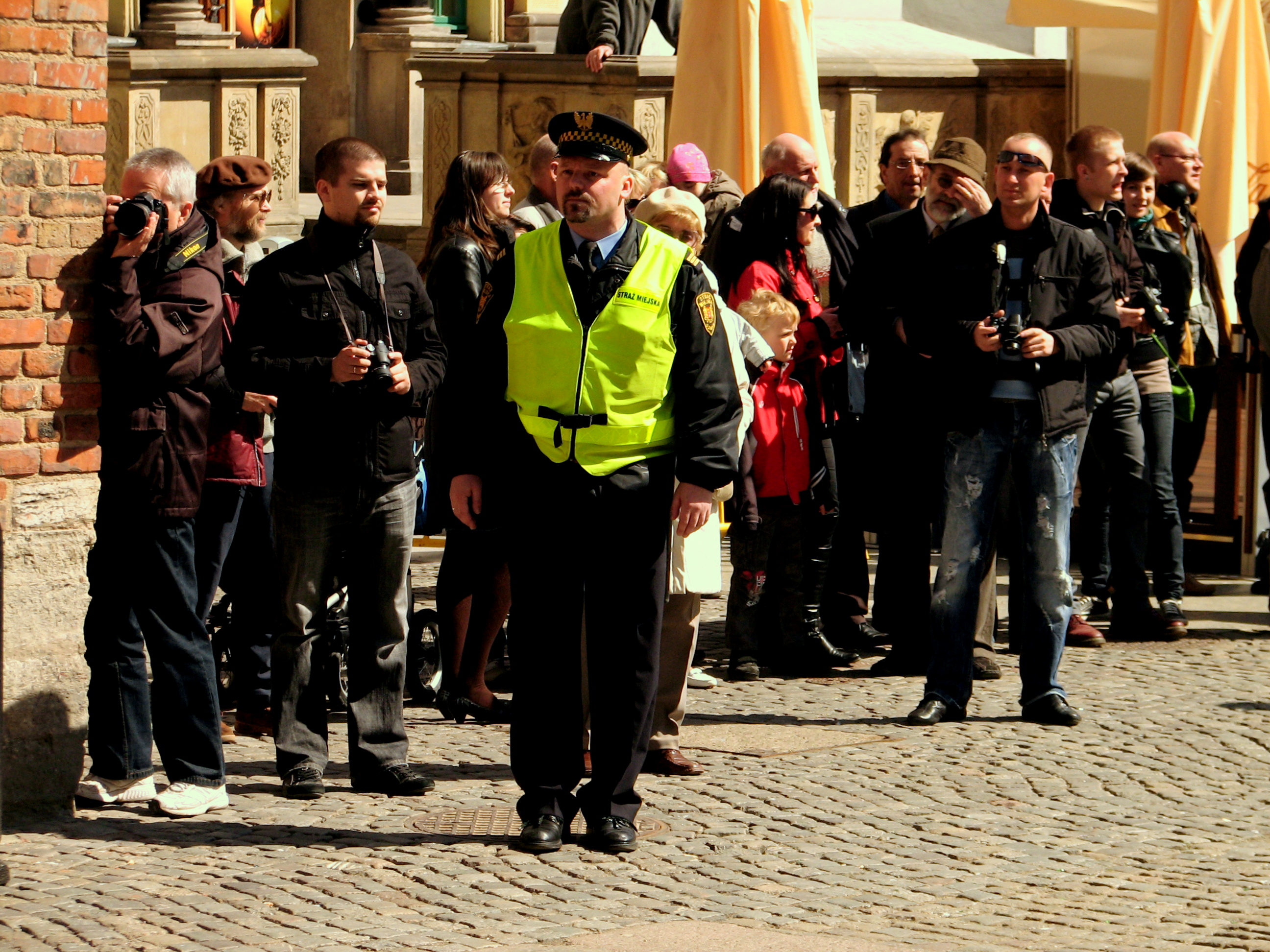
A Polish City Guard ensures order at a re-enactment event in Gdańsk.

Straż Miejska (English: City guard) are municipal police officers who like British PCSOs have limited powers and are not as well armed as fully powered officers but are known to be equipped with batons, handcuffs, tear gas launchers and more recently tasers. There are also plans to allow them to carry handguns of a lesser calibre that the Polish National Police carry.

In the event of a major incident, they must request the aid of an officer of the National Police.

=== Spain ===
In some areas of Spain that are unable to have a local municipal police, their function is performed by the Guardia Civil or autonomous Community force who are assisted by officers known as "Vigilantes Municipales" who are uniformed municipal employees with limited powers.

=== Sri Lanka ===
The Government of Sri Lanka has proposed the formation of a Community Police Service (CPS) of 28,000 members to be deployed alongside Grama Niladhari (village officers) to resolve minor disputes and youth offenders. Mirroring the role of old Police Vidane in villages, two CPS members would allocated to each Grama Niladhari division and operate out of the village Grama Niladhari office instead of the local Police Station. Reporting to the State Minister for Community Police Services, this force would have local members serving in their own residential areas acting as intelligence officers for the state and work closely with local civil defence committees. The new recruits will have the same powers as a police constable, and have a similar rank structure up to the grate of Sergeant. Once promoted to the rank of Sub Inspector, they will be assigned other duties in the Sri Lanka Police.

=== Thailand ===
The Royal Thai Police formed the Phuket Tourist Police Department, staffed by Tourist Police Volunteers to deal with growing crime problems related to tourism in Thailand. Their role is to support police officers, helping tourists and patrolling mostly by foot.

They wear a different uniform but unlike British PCSOs, they carry pepper spray and batons in addition to handcuffs. They do not carry firearms as Thai police officers do.

A lot of their recruits are foreigners, to make relations easier between the police and tourists.

The Tourist Police Volunteers and their work were featured in the TV documentary Big Trouble in Thailand.

=== The Netherlands ===
In The Netherlands, there are municipal SEOs (Special enforcement officers). These assist the police on certain pieces of the law. They could be working in cities as municipal code inspectors, parking enforcement, public transport or in environmental departments. These officers have police powers like detaining people, issue fines and use force when arresting a person. Most municipalities issue handcuffs to the officers, in some cities also police batons are a part of the officers equipment. In a few cities officers are allowed to carry and use pepper spray. Only a few cities have SEOs with additional schooling carrying a firearm, these officers a mostly employed in dense areas like forests. A SEO (or BOA in Dutch) has the status of civil servant and is not a uniformed civilian unlike security guards. Until 2014 every municipality could use a uniform of their choice, some wear exact police uniforms with peaked caps and blue trousers with black striping. From 2015 the justice ministry created a uniform specially for municipal enforcement. This consists of a polo shirt, worker trousers, baseball cap and soft-shell jackets and were inspired by the Spanish municipal police uniforms with checkers bands on shirts and hats.

The Dutch police also knows police volunteers, these are divided in two categories; administrative and operational. Operational officers have the same rank, uniform and weapons as regular police officers. There is practically no difference between them, besides their payment.

=== United States ===
Community Service Officers (CSO) have been used in the US since the 1970s by several police departments. These are unsworn uniformed civilians who provide support in crime prevention, investigation, and response where full police powers are unnecessary and assists sworn police officers in upholding law and order. They are not provided with any legal powers above and beyond a normal citizen. A major difference between this role and the UK equivalent is that the US counterparts are not dispatched to ongoing incidents.

Depending on the police department they work for they may be equipped with handcuffs, batons, pepper spray and tasers as possession of these items in the US is usually not considered being 'armed'.

The term is also occasionally used for contractor hired individuals dealing with inebriated homeless individuals, as in Anchorage, Alaska They are dispatched via the central dispatch. Anchorage requires them to have EMT training.

== In fiction ==
Despite being in recent years the more visible aspect of policing in England and Wales, PCSOs have rarely been featured in fictional television programmes or films, but there are some examples that are the exception:

The 2008 British drama film Adulthood directed by Noel Clarke starred David Ajala as PCSO Desmond "Buds".

The popular long-running British police drama The Bill featured two Metropolitan Police PCSO characters; PCSO Colin Fairfax played by Tim Steed and PCSO Laura Bryant played by Melanie Kilburn. Both started at the same time in episode 278. PCSO Bryant is shown eventually becoming a police constable, accurately portraying the fact that many PCSOs go on to become constables. After both PCSOs left neither was replaced and The Bill never again portrayed PCSOs despite their common presence in real life.

Paul Abbott's long-running drama series Shameless occasionally features police community support officers. For example, in series 8 episode 19, a PCSO is seen getting out of a police vehicle and chasing Aidan Croker.

Hollyoaks the long-running British television soap opera, on Channel 4 featured for many years Carmel McQueen played by Gemma Merna who was portrayed as being a PCSO between 2009 and 2010.

PCSOs have also featured in a few comedy sketch programmes including Season 3, Episode 1 of That Mitchell and Webb Look.

PCSOs were featured in the BBC Radio 4 sitcom by Dave Lamb Hobby Bobbies.

In 2009 the long running children's British comedy television series ChuckleVision featured PCSOs in Season 21, Episode 2 "Top of the Cops" where the shows main characters the Chuckle Brothers Paul & Barry Chuckle are depicted as PCSOs fresh out of training sent out on patrol for the first time.

In 2015, a PCSO is shown guarding a crime scene on No Offence, episode 6, where he has a brief conversation with a Detective Inspector and Detective Constable.

In 2016, season 2 of the BBC series Happy Valley featured Ann Gallagher, played by Charlie Murphy, becoming a PCSO following the events of her kidnapping in the first season.

== See also ==
- UK police ranks
- Police Reform Act 2002
