= Community beat manager =

Policing role in the UK

A community beat manager (CBM) is a police officer within the British Police's territorial police forces, such as the Metropolitan Police Service and Greater Manchester Police. The CBM is usually responsible for a particular neighbourhood or area of a town or city. Most commonly CBMs are Constables. Currently CBMs are part of Safer Neighbourhood Policing Teams (SNTs), which are commonly made up of a Sergeant, two to three Constables and two PCSOs. SNTs use CBMs in a way that is reminiscent of the "British Bobby" in an aid to revive the conception that is thought by the public.

== Lancashire ==
Community beat managers in Lancashire Constabulary are considered problem solvers and aim to address quality of life issues for local residents, and regularly work in partnership with members of the public and other agencies in order to improve their area. Community Beat Managers are accessible to the public and have regular monthly meetings, called PACT Meetings. PACT is an acronym for Police and Communities Together, which the Lancashire Constabulary are keen to promote. Community Beat Managers also hold regular surgeries, so that local residents can consult with their local officer about issues which affect them.

== North Wales ==
The community beat manager (Welsh: Swyddog Rhawd Cymunedol) title has also been adopted by North Wales Police in their Neighbourhood Policing Plan to identify their community police officers. The officer's role is similar to the Lancashire Constabulary model, the officers in North Wales also have responsibilities to manage and task PCSOs, Special Constables and Volunteers. The teams manage Community Action Plans and are accountable to their local communities. These action plans can cover a wide range of community-based problems from anti-social behaviour to environmental concerns such as graffiti removal. All residents in North Wales can identify and find contact details for their Neighbourhood Policing Teams via the North Wales Police website.

== See also ==
- Community policing
