= Neighbourhood policing team =

UK law enforcement

A neighbourhood policing team (NPT), also sometimes known as safer neighbourhood team (SNT), is a small team of police officers and police community support officers (usually 3–10 strong) who are dedicated to policing a certain community or area.

It is a concept developed by the police of the United Kingdom. As of 2010, there are 3,600 NPTs throughout the United Kingdom.

This type of policing is designed to make the police more visible, reduce fear and aid interaction between the public and the police, while aiding in gaining local knowledge, intelligence and tip-offs from the public.

NPTs are led by a police officer, usually of sergeant or inspector rank, and may include police community support officers, special constables, local council staff and members of voluntary organisations, such as a neighbourhood watch.

Usually NPTs are responsible for patrolling an area of around 4 square miles (10 km^{2}) of urban area or around 10 square miles (26 km^{2}) of rural area.

== See also ==
- Community policing
- Community Beat Manager
- Police patrol
- Police area
- The Policing Pledge
- Neighbourhood Policing Plan
- Neighbourhood police centre (Singapore)
- Neighborhood watch
