= CBM TV =

News TV channel in the United Kingdom that never launched

CBM
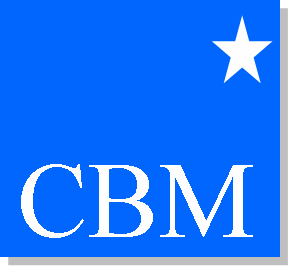

Ownership
- Owner: CBM Media; Turner Broadcasting System Europe (Time Warner)

History
- Launched: Never; supposed to in 2003
- Closed: 6 August 2003

Links
- Website: www.cbmmedia.co.uk (Internet Archive)

Availability proposed availability

Terrestrial
- Freeview: Channel 22 (never launched)

CBM was a potential television channel owned by the East Midlands company, CBM Media, to be broadcast in the United Kingdom. It was to be carried on Freeview on multiplex D. The channel was to provide business news from Bloomberg (including a daily 5am-10am simulcast), independent movies and minor sports to anyone with a Freeview receiver.

Its placeholder, originally named "Ch 22" was added from Freeview's launch in 2002 and was expected to host Turner Classic Movies. However, from 1 May 2003, the placeholder was renamed "CBM" and a test transmission banner was shown, informing viewers "New Service Launching Soon!" This screen was shown until 6 August 2003, when the plug was pulled on the channel. The static caption was removed and the channel was relabelled as "Channel 22" on the EPG.

== Termination of contract ==
On 8 August 2003, Crown Castle (now Arqiva) being the owner of the multiplex, terminated CBM's broadcasting contract, stating that CBM Media were having trouble "reaching strategic milestones", and "no movement had occurred in the channel's launch". Crown Castle then anticipated that the slot was to be filled by timeshare broadcasters, each having a certain amount of time on air. This was abolished in April 2004, when the 24-hour shopping channel Ideal World took over the channel 22 spot.

After the collapse of the deal, CBM Media began considering its options, which included taking legal proceeding for breach of contract by Crown Castle and making a formal complaint to the Independent Television Commission on competition grounds, with a spokesman for CBM Media said that Crown Castle had "no valid basis for termination." Meanwhile, CBM Media persisted with plans to launch a new channel on Freeview in 2004. The channel would have been devoted entirely to sports, with the working title "Freesport". CBM had reached agreements with 12 national sports bodies for coverage of low profile sports such as rowing, swimming, badminton, canoeing, cycling and netball. However, nothing was to come of the plans.
