= Chartered Management Institute =

Professional institution for management based in the United Kingdom

- Abbreviation: CMI
- Predecessor: British Institute of Management and the Institution of Industrial Managers
- Formation: 1947; 79 years ago Royal Charter gained in 2002
- Legal status: Chartered body
- Headquarters: Corby and London, United Kingdom
- Members: 180,000
- President: Fiona Dawson
- Chief Executive: Ann Francke
- Website: managers.org.uk

The Chartered Management Institute (CMI) is a professional institution for management based in the United Kingdom. It was founded as the British Institute of Management (BIM) in 1947 or 1948, merged with the Institution of Industrial Managers (IIM) in 1992 to form the Institute of Management (IM), and gained a royal charter, and its present name, in 2002.

The major membership classes are:

- Member
- Fellow – Senior most position for those with significant expertise

In addition to supporting its members, the organisation encourages management development, carries out research, produces publications on management interests, and publishes the official members' magazine, Professional Manager. The institute also engages with government and other public bodies concerning policy on management and business related issues.

== History ==
Timeline

- 1945 - Sir Stafford Cripps, the president of the Board of Trade appointed a Committee, under the chairmanship of Sir Clive Baillieu (president of the Federation of British Industries - the forerunner of the CBS) to formulate detailed proposals for the establishment of a central institution for all aspects related to management. One of the reasons behind this move was the realisation that, although there were professional bodies representing functional activities, there was no comparable body for general management thinking and for the development and promotion of better management.
- 1947 or 1948 - Following the recommendations of the Baillieu Report, the British Institute of Management (BIM) was formed (sources differ as to the exact year).
- 1951 - The UK's first Diploma in Management Studies was introduced by the BIM and the Ministry of Education.
- 1987 - The BIM, in conjunction with other bodies, issued two pivotal reports, The making of British managers (John Constable and Roger McCormick), and The making of managers (Charles Handy). These reports led to the formation of the National Forum for Management Education and Development (NFMED) and, subsequently, the Management Charter Initiative (MCI), which spearheaded the issue of the world's first competency-based national management standards.
- 1992 - BIM merged with the Institution of Industrial Managers (IIM) to form the Institute of Management (IM). The awarding body status of the IIM was transferred to the new Institute.
- 2000 - The Institute accredited its 250th approved centre to deliver IM management qualifications.
- 2001 - The Institute of Interim Management was formed as a Special Interest Group within the Institute of Management.
- 2002 - The Institute of Management was awarded a Royal Charter and became the Chartered Management Institute.
- 2002 - The institute's management qualifications were recognised as part of the UK's National Qualifications Framework for Higher Education.
- 2002 - The Institute of Interim Management by mutual agreement with the CMI, gained an independent status.
- 2003 - The Chartered Manager designation was launched.
- 2005 - The Institute of Management Consultancy (IMC) became an 'organisation within the Institute'
- 2005 – The institute assumed the presidency of the European Management Association (EMA) for a three-year term
- 2005 - The institute's first National Convention is held at the Queen's Hotel in Leeds
- 2006 – The Institute of Business Advisers (IBA) became an 'organisation with the Institute' and discussions commenced with a view to achieving a merger between IBA and IMC by mid-2007
- 2007 - National Convention held in Birmingham at the Hilton Metropole
- 2007 - IBA becomes IBC, the Institute of Business Consulting
- 2008 - Ruth Spellman is appointed Chief Executive
- 2008 - National Convention held in Birmingham at the Hilton Metropole
- 2009 - National Convention held in London at the London Hilton Metropole.
- 2011 - Ruth Spellman suddenly leaves CMI in August with Christopher Kinsella being appointed as interim CE
- 2011 - A survey of members, conducted by Huw Hilditch-Roberts, concluded that branches should be scrapped in order to improve engagement with the membership.
- 2012 - Ann Francke is appointed in June as Chief Executive.
- 2013 - New Regional Chairmen appointed and Regional Boards elected to take over from branches in October.
- 2014 - Mike Clasper is appointed as president

== See also ==
- Canadian Institute of Management
- The Institute of Leadership and Management
- List of professional associations in the United Kingdom
- Ofqual, the Office of Qualifications and Examinations Regulation
- Outline of management
