= Canadian Institute of Management =

Canadian professional association

CIM Chartered Managers Canada
- Founded: 1942, Federal Charter 1956
- Website: www.cim.ca

CIM | Chartered Managers Canada is Canada's senior professional association, certification body, and academic institute for managers and leaders. Founded in 1942, it offers post-nominal designations including Certified in Management (C.I.M.) and Chartered Manager (C.Mgr.).

== History ==
CIM | Chartered Managers Canada was founded in 1942 as the Society of Industrial Methods Engineers and, in 1946, became the Canadian Industrial Management Association. It became the Canadian Institute of Management in 1970 and 2016 rebranded to CIM | Chartered Managers Canada to reflect its role as Canada's certifying body for chartered management professionals.

As a Federally Chartered not-for-profit organization, CIM | Chartered Managers Canada operates through and Head Office and Chapters across Canada.

== National Accreditation Framework (NAF) ==
Through the National Accreditation Framework, CIM | Chartered Managers Canada accredits academic programs within Canadian colleges, polytechnics, and universities as meeting the requirements for the Chartered Management Program (CMP) leading to Chartered Manager (C.Mgr.) and the Certified in Management (C.I.M.) professional designations.

== Chartered Manager Competency Framework (CMCF) ==
The CMCF outlines the competencies required for the designation of Chartered Manager (C.Mgr.). It provides academic institutions with the benchmark for the development of effective academic programs that will lead to this professional designation.

== Professional Designations ==
CIM | Chartered Managers Canada offers the following post-nominal designations:

- Certified in Management (C.I.M.)
- Chartered Manager (C.Mgr.)

== Certified in Management (C.I.M.) ==
The Certified in Management (C.I.M.) designation is awarded upon completion of the 8-course CMP leading to the Certificate in Management and Administration and 24 months of validated professional management experience. The academic requirement for the C.I.M. designation are offered through the CIM and partner institutions across Canada.

== Chartered Manager (C.Mgr.) ==
Chartered Manager is the CIM's senior management qualification and chartered professional designation for applicants with undergraduate or graduate degrees. It is abbreviated as C.Mgr. and used as a post-nominal to accredited members in good standing. The designation also gives the holders an exclusive right to use the full title of "Chartered Manager" in Canada.

== Fellow of the Canadian Institute of Management (F.CIM) ==
The Fellowship Designation is an honorary award to individuals with a record of distinction and achievement in their community, locally, regionally and nationally.

== International Reciprocity ==
CIM Chartered Managers are eligible to obtain Chartered Manager in the UK through the Chartered Management Institute and Certified Manager in the US through the Institute of Certified Professional Managers.
