= Super Furry Animals discography =

Music discography

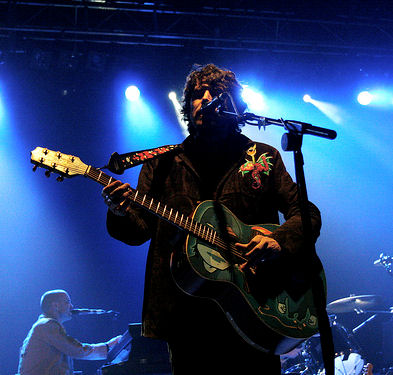
- Super Furry Animals performing live in Barcelona, Spain in 2007. From left to right: Cian Ciaran, Gruff Rhys
- Studio albums: 9
- Extended plays: 4
- Compilation albums: 3
- Singles: 23
- Video albums: 3
- Music videos: 25
- Miscellaneous: 6

The discography of Super Furry Animals, a Welsh indie rock band, consists of nine studio albums, four extended plays, twenty three singles and three video albums. Super Furry Animals were formed in 1993 in Cardiff, Wales by Gruff Rhys (lead vocals, guitar), Huw Bunford (lead guitar, vocals), Guto Pryce (bass guitar), Cian Ciaran (keyboards, synthesizers, various electronics, occasional guitar, vocals) and Dafydd Ieuan (drums, vocals).

== Studio albums ==
Year	Album details	Peak chart positions					Certifications (sales thresholds)
Year	Album details	UK	IRE	NOR	US Heat	US Indie	Certifications (sales thresholds)
1996	Fuzzy Logic: Released: 20 May 1996; Label: Creation (CRECD190, CCRE190, CRELP190); Formats: CD, CS, DL, LP	23	—	—	—	—	UK: Gold
1997	Radiator: Released: 25 August 1997; Label: Creation (CRECD214, CCRE214, CRELP214); Formats: CD, CS, DL, LP, MD	8	—	—	—	—	UK: Silver
1999	Guerrilla: Released: 14 June 1999; Label: Creation (CRECD242, CCRE242, CRELP242); Formats: CD, CS, DL, LP, MD	10	—	—	—	—	UK: Silver
2000	Mwng: Released: 15 May 2000; Label: Placid Casual (PLC03CD, PLC03MC, PLC03LP); Formats: CD, CS, DL, LP	11	—	—	—	—	—
2001	Rings Around the World: Released: 23 July 2001; Label: Epic (5024139); Formats: CD, CS, DL, LP, MD, DVD-V	3	16	—	—	32	UK: Gold
2003	Phantom Power: Released: 21 July 2003; Label: Epic (512375); Formats: CD, DL, LP	4	12	36	17	14	UK: Silver
2005	Love Kraft: Released: 22 August 2005; Label: Epic (520501); Formats: CD, DL, LP, SACD	19	23	—	38	47	—
2007	Hey Venus!: Released: 27 August 2007; Label: Rough Trade (RTRADCD346, RTRADLP346); Formats: CD, DL, LP	11	16	—	19	—	—
2009	Dark Days/Light Years: Released: 16 March 2009; Label: Rough Trade (RTRADCD546, RTRADLP546); Formats: CD, DL, LP	23	39	—	—	—	—

== Compilation albums ==
Year	Album details	Peak chart positions	
Year	Album details	UK	IRE
1998	Out Spaced: Released: 23 November 1998; Label: Creation (CRECD229, CRECD229L, CRELP229); Formats: CD, DL, LP	44	—
2004	Phantom Phorce: Released: 19 April 2004; Label: Placid Casual (PLC07CD, PLC07LP); Formats: CD, DL, LP	81	—
2004	Songbook: The Singles, Vol. 1: Released: 4 October 2004; Label: Epic (517671); Formats: CD, DL, LP, DVD-V	18	67
2016	Zoom! The Best of 1995–2016: Released: 4 November 2016; Label: BMG; Formats: CD, DL	—	—
2026	Precreation Percolation: Released: 1 May 2026; Label: BMG; Formats: CD, DL, LP	—	—

== Extended plays ==
Year	EP details	Peak chart positions
Year	EP details	UK
1995	Llanfair... (in Space): Released: June 1995; Label: Ankst (ANKSTCD057, ANKST057); Format: CD, 7"	151
1995	Moog Droog: Released: October 1995; Label: Ankst (ANKSTCD062, ANKST062); Format: CD, 7"	163
1998	Ice Hockey Hair: Released: 25 May 1998; Label: Creation (CRESCD288, CRES288, CRE288T, CRE288); Format: CD, Cassette, 7", LP	12
2004	Slow Life: Released: 12 April 2004; Label: Placid Casual (PLC08EP); Format: Download, CD	—

== Singles ==
Year	Song	Peak chart positions				Album
Year	Song	UK	IRE	NLD	EUR	Album
1996	"Hometown Unicorn"	47	—	—	—	Fuzzy Logic
1996	"God! Show Me Magic"	33	—	—	—	Fuzzy Logic
1996	"Something 4 the Weekend"	18	—	—	—	Fuzzy Logic
1996	"If You Don't Want Me to Destroy You"	18	—	—	—	Fuzzy Logic
1996	"The Man Don't Give a Fuck"	22	—	—	—	Non-album single
1997	"Hermann ♥'s Pauline"	26	—	—	—	Radiator
1997	"The International Language of Screaming"	24	—	—	—	Radiator
1997	"Play It Cool"	27	—	—	—	Radiator
1997	"Demons"	27	—	—	—	Radiator
1999	"Northern Lites"	11	—	—	—	Guerrilla
1999	"Fire in My Heart"	25	—	—	—	Guerrilla
2000	"Do or Die"	20	—	—	—	Guerrilla
2000	"Ysbeidiau Heulog"	81	—	—	—	Mwng
2001	"Juxtapozed with U"	14	34	92	—	Rings Around the World
2001	"(Drawing) Rings Around the World"	28	—	—	—	Rings Around the World
2002	"It's Not the End of the World?"	30	—	—	—	Rings Around the World
2003	"Golden Retriever"	13	38	—	—	Phantom Power
2003	"Hello Sunshine"	31	—	—	—	Phantom Power
2004	"The Man Don't Give a Fuck (Live)"	16	49	—	—	Non-album single
2005	"Lazer Beam"	28	—	—	85	Love Kraft
2007	"Show Your Hand"	46	—	—	—	Hey Venus!
2007	"Run-Away"	120	—	—	—	Hey Venus!
2007	"The Gift That Keeps Giving"^{[A]}	—	—	—	—	Hey Venus!
2009	"Inaugural Trams"^{[B]}	—	—	—	—	Dark Days/Light Years
2009	"Mt."	—	—	—	—	Dark Days/Light Years
2016	"Bing Bong"	—	—	—	—	Non-album single

Notes

- A Issued as a free download single from the band's official website.
- B Radio only single made available to listen to free online from the band's official website before the release of Dark Days/Light Years.

== Video albums ==
Year	Video details
2001	Rings Around the World: Released: 23 July 2001; Label: Epic; Format: DVD
2003	Phantom Power: Released: 21 July 2003; Label: Epic; Format: DVD
2004	Songbook: The Singles, Vol. 1: Released: 4 October 2004; Label: Epic; Format: DVD

== Music videos ==
Year	Title	Director
1995	"Focus Pocus/Debiel"	Daniel Glyn and Matthew Glyn
1996	"Hometown Unicorn"	Brian Cannon
1996	"God! Show Me Magic"	Brian Cannon
1996	"Something 4 the Weekend"	Brian Cannon
1996	"If You Don't Want Me to Destroy You"	Brian Cannon
1997	"Hermann ♥'s Pauline"	Mark Nunneley
1997	"The International Language of Screaming"	Geoff Everson
1997	"Play It Cool"	Mark Nunneley
1997	"Demons"	Brian Cannon
1998	"Ice Hockey Hair"	Daf Palfrey
1998	"Smokin'"	Peter Gray
1999	"Northern Lites"	Super Furry Animals and Martin McCarthy
1999	"Fire in My Heart"	Jake & Jim
2000	"Do or Die"	Jake & Jim
2001	"Juxtapozed with U"	Dawn of the New Assembly/H5
2001	"(Drawing) Rings Around the World"	Pedro Romhanyi
2002	"It's Not the End of the World?"	Numero 6
2003	"Golden Retriever"	Jake & Jim
2003	"Hello Sunshine"	Pete Fowler
2004	"Slow Life"	Dylan Jones and Paps O'Maoileoain
2004	"The Man Don't Give a Fuck (Live)"	Dylan Jones
2005	"Lazer Beam"	Palumbo & Coch
2005	"Lazer Beam (Alternative Version)"	Aurelien and Florian Marrel
2007	"Run-Away"	Richard Ayoade
2007	"The Gift That Keeps Giving"	Team D.A.D.D.Y.
2009	"Mt."	Super Furry Animals
2016	"BingBong"	Mark James Works

Additionally, the album Rings Around the World was released with low-budget videos accompanying each track.

== Miscellaneous ==
=== Songs ===
The following songs by Super Furry Animals appear on compilation albums but were not issued as singles or included on a studio album by the band.

Year	Song	Album	Notes
1995	"Dim Brys Dim Chwys"	Triskadekaphilia	Compilation album released by former record label Ankst. The track was later made available on b-side and rarities collection Out Spaced.
2003	"A Frosty Night In Gothenburg"	Depressed Celts Vol 1	Hidden track on compilation album by the band's own record label Placid Casual.

=== Collaborations ===
Year	Song	Collaborator/s	Album	Notes
2000	"Peter Blake 2000"	The Beatles	Liverpool Sound Collage	Electronic collage of old Beatles recordings.
2000	"Free Now"	Paul McCartney, The Beatles	Liverpool Sound Collage	Electronic collage of out-takes from Beatles recording sessions along with several audio recordings made by Paul McCartney including "sounds of the Mersey Tunnel".

=== Remixes ===
Year	Song	Original artist	Album	Notes
2002	"Dreamy Days"	Roots Manuva	Dub Come Save Me	Dub re-working of Root Manuva's second album, Run Come Save Me by various artists.
2003	"SFA Dunk! Dunk! Dunk! Edit"	FC Kahuna	Hayling (Single)	B-side remix of single from the album Machine Says Yes.
2004	"Sleepy California"	Her Space Holiday	The Young Machines Remixed	Her Space Holiday album featuring remixes of tracks from The Young Machines.
2005	"The Proper Ornaments"	The Free Design	The Now Sound Redesigned	Appeared alongside contributions by Stereolab, Danger Mouse and Caribou on an album of remixes of The Free Design songs issued by Light In The Attic Records who "rediscovered" the band in the early 2000s.

=== Mixtapes ===
The following albums feature tracks by other artists chosen by one or more of the Super Furry Animals.

Year	Album	Notes
2005	Under the Influence: Super Furry Animals	Compilation album featuring tracks picked by the Super Furry Animals.
2007	Furry Selection: Luxury Cuts Of Trojan Chosen By A Super Furry Animal	Compilation album featuring reggae tracks from the Trojan Records archive picked by Guto Pryce.
