= Show Your Hand =

Single by Super Furry Animals

from the album Hey Venus!
- Released: 16 July 2007 (Download only); 13 August 2007
- Recorded: Miraval Studios, France
- Genre: Indie rock
- Length: 2:51
- Label: Rough Trade Records
- Songwriter: Super Furry Animals
- Producer: Super Furry Animals with David Newfeld

Super Furry Animals singles chronology
"Lazer Beam" (2005)	"Show Your Hand" (2007)	"Run-Away"" (2007)

"Show Your Hand" is a song by Welsh rock band Super Furry Animals and was the first single from their 2007 album, Hey Venus!. The single was made available for download on 16 July 2007 as an iTunes exclusive and was later released in physical formats on 13 August in the UK. The track failed to penetrate the UK singles chart's Top 40, peaking at #46.

According to lead singer Gruff Rhys the track is "a song about gambling" and was originally going to be left off Hey Venus! for being "too generic" before Rough Trade boss Geoff Travis persuaded the band to reconsider their decision. Critical reaction to the track was mixed with some reviewers claiming "Show Your Hand" was "ponderously mature" and "more like the generic pop songs one would find on the radio" while others hailed the track as "classic Furries".

Unlike the two other singles taken from Hey Venus!, "Run-Away" and "The Gift That Keeps Giving", no music video was produced for "Show Your Hand".

== Origins and recording ==
In an interview with Pitchfork Media given before the release of Hey Venus!, singer Gruff Rhys claimed "Show Your Hand" was "a song about gambling. There's lots of card-playing going on in the Super Furry Animals [tour bus], which may have [had] a slight influence on the subject matter". Rhys went on to state that the song was initially left off Hey Venus! for being "too generic":

I mean, we love The Zombies and bands of that era, and we felt maybe we'd pushed it too far, you know?

A combination of pressure from Rough Trade's Geoff Travis and Jeannette Lee ("Where's that song gone? That's our favorite song!") and the addition of a French horn part, written by Cian Ciaran, resulted in the song finally taking its place on the record. Although the majority of the track was recorded at Miraval Studios, France along with the rest of Hey Venus!, additional recording also took place with Chris Shaw who mixed the album. According to Cian Ciaran both b-sides to "Show Your Hand", namely "Aluminium Illuminati" and "Never More", were originally recorded during sessions for 2003's Phantom Power although "Aluminium Illuminati" was mentioned as a working title as early as May 2000 in connection with 2001's Rings Around the World album.

== Musical structure ==
Super Furry Animals "Show Your Hand" (2007)
Short sample from "Show Your Hand" illustrating the track's key change chorus which takes place before the outro.

"Show Your Hand" is 2 minutes 51 seconds long and is in the key of E minor. The song begins with a "Kevin Ayers-style psych-pop intro"; "a Beatlesque harpsichord line" accompanied by intermittent bass and occasional strummed guitar chords with Rhys singing the lines "You're perched so neatly on the fence, you're keeping your cards all to yourself..." as the songs builds to its first chorus on 30 seconds.

"Emphatic power chords" takes the song into the "rarefied soft-rock territory" of the chorus with Rhys singing the title phrase four times before being joined by "sugar-sweet harmonies from the Brian Wilson School of Spine-Tingling Pop" on the last lines: "I'm jumping off the fence, into your corner". Another verse and chorus follow before the song's middle 8 at 1 minute 31 seconds, a multi-layered vocal take on a regular verse featuring just 'bah, bah, bahs' in place of lyrics.

The song ends with a triple chorus (the third of which features a key change to A major) as "French horn counterpoints usher the song towards its climax", the line "jumping off the fence" repeating three times before a staccato finish with Rhys singing "into your corner", drawing out the last word.

== Critical response ==
Although some critics hailed the track as a 'return to form' for the band, with the Manchester Evening News describing the song as a "the best that the Furries have sounded in ages ... a return to the mellow-but-bouncy pop fare of their early albums Fuzzy Logic and Guerilla", others pointed out that "Show Your Hand" is "ponderously mature", rather "straightforward" and "more like the generic pop songs one would find on the radio than [that] of a historically experimental band". However, The Guardian stated that "Show Your Hand" "is the sort of music [the Super Furry Animals] do best - hazy, lazy sunshine pop". And while Cokemachineglow believed the track "may not have the staying power or the immediate pull of the Super Furry Animals' best singles" their reviewer conceded that "it's not too far behind".

The 'retro' nature of the track was commented on by several critics with The Independent describing the track as being performed in a "sophisticated soft-rock style" which recalls "the arrangements of The Association and Surf's Up-era Beach Boys", Pitchfork Media calling the song "Zombies-esque orchestral pop", and Drowned in Sound describing "Show Your Hand" as "an almost Bacharachian gem":

Swimming in the dreamy swathes that typified Phantom Power rather than the acid-pop that provides their real edge, "Show Your Hand" is still hewn from a rich seam and glides on a joyously melodic horn and vocal exchange. There's little that sits in the ear more sweetly than Super Fury Animals in this form, and that leaves small room for complaint.

BBC Wales described "Show Your Hand" as "classic Furries" in a favourable review on their website to coincide with the release of the track as a single going on to state that it is:

A song of gambling and indecision, with a dark edge and plenty of clever wordplay, it's a perfect record to lift dampened spirits this summer.

== Track listing ==
All songs by Super Furry Animals.

- CD (RTRADSCD402)
  1. "Show Your Hand" – 2:51
  2. "Aluminium Illuminati" – 2:37
  3. "Never More" – 2:25
- 7" (RTRADS402)
  1. "Show Your Hand" – 2:51
  2. "Never More" – 2:25

== Personnel ==
- Gruff Rhys: vocals
- Huw Bunford: guitar
- Guto Pryce: bass guitar
- Cian Ciaran: keyboards
- Dafydd Ieuan: drums
- Kris Jenkins: percussion
- Gary Alesbrook: trumpet
- Nick Atwood: trombone
- Martin Owen: French horn
- Phil Woods: French horn

- Kathryn Saunders: French horn
- Brian Wright: violin
- Charles Nolan: violin
- Rick Koster: violin
- Laura Melhuish: violin
- Amanda Britton: violin
- Sally Herbert: violin
- Marcus Holloway: cello
- Ian Burdge: cello

== Singles chart positions ==
Chart	Peak position
UK Singles Chart	46
