= Hey Venus! =

Studio album by Super Furry Animals
- Released: 27 August 2007
- Studios: Miraval Studios, France and Rockfield Studios, Monmouth
- Genre: Indie rock
- Length: 36:27
- Label: Rough Trade
- Producers: David Newfeld, Super Furry Animals

Super Furry Animals chronology
Love Kraft (2005)	Hey Venus! (2007)	Dark Days/Light Years (2009)

Singles from Hey Venus!
- 1. "Show Your Hand" Released: 16 July 2007; 2. "Run-Away" Released: 29 October 2007; 3. "The Gift That Keeps Giving" Released: 25 December 2007

Hey Venus! is the eighth studio album by Welsh band Super Furry Animals. It was released on 27 August 2007 in the United Kingdom. Hey Venus! is the band's first full-length release on current label Rough Trade Records and, at just over 36 minutes, is also their shortest-running studio release. The title is taken from the first line of the song "Into the Night".

The album was conceived as a "rowdy pop record", both in response to Rough Trade's request for "one of those pop records like you used to make" and as a result of the "very different atmosphere" the band encountered at shows on the Love Kraft tour when the 'slow' songs from that album were played. In contrast with many Super Furry Animals albums, no samplers were used during recording of Hey Venus! as the group made a conscious decision to create a "simple record" which "capture[d] the spirit of the band playing live in a room". Dave Newfeld took over production duties from Mario Caldato Jr., who had worked on both Phantom Power and Love Kraft, as the band didn't want to "repeat [their] past two records". As with Love Kraft, all members of the band contributed songs at the recording stage but, besides chief songwriter Gruff Rhys, only guitarist Huw Bunford ("Battersea Odyssey") and keyboard player Cian Ciaran ("Carbon Dating") ended up with their tracks on the finished album.

The album follows the life and adventures of a character called Venus as she moves "from a small town to a big metropolis". The band have given several explanations for the appearance of this narrative arc in the record claiming variously that Hey Venus! was conceived as a concept album, that the similar themes in the songs were only noticed after they had been written and were used as a way of "structuring and compiling the album" and that the Venus concept was thought up after the album's completion in order to give sleeve designer Keiichi Tanaami "a reference point to make an illustration from." After working with Pete Fowler since 1997's Radiator the band asked Tanaami to produce artwork for Hey Venus!, having been "blown away" by his work on a Japanese tour.

Critical response was generally positive with some reviews claiming Hey Venus! is "[the band's] most satisfying work" and exhibits a "full-fledged return to pop power". Some critics, however, pointed out that the album has the "faint whiff of musical conservatism" and "must rank as [the Super Furry Animals'] least adventurous" record.

== Background ==
In an interview with Tiny Mix Tapes in January 2008, the band's vocalist, Gruff Rhys, stated that Hey Venus! was deliberately conceived as a 'pop' record following a request from the band's new record label Rough Trade:

... [Rough Trade] asked us 'Can't you make one of those pop records like you used to make'. So we looked at the songs we had, because we're always writing. We kind of chose songs that we could play as a band that would be quite simple to record that we thought was some kind of pop music.

Rhys has also stated that after Love Kraft the band was "kind of thinking of making a loud record" following the "very different atmosphere" at initial shows on the Love Kraft tour when the group played the "slow" songs from that album. Towards the end of the tour the setlist had become "full of fast songs from [the Super Furry Animals] back catalog" and this had an effect as the band entered into the studio for the Hey Venus! sessions: "It's definitely the first time our audience has influenced our music in that sense". Rhys used his second solo album, Candylion, as an outlet for the quiet, acoustic songs that he had written rather than put them forward for inclusion on Hey Venus!:

We wanted to make a really abrasive, loud record, so I figured I could keep fifteen-minute ballads like "Skylon!" and songs about lions made out of candy for the indulgent solo project.

== Recording ==
Super Furry Animals "Show Your Hand" (2007)
Short sample from "Show Your Hand", the album's lead single, illustrating the French horn part which "pushed the song back into contention and back on the record".

Super Furry Animals "Into the Night" (2007)
Short sample from "Into the Night" illustrating the band's use of different instruments, in this case electric saz, alongside bass guitar, drums, keyboard and guitar. Gruff Rhys has described the track as one of his favourites from the album.

Super Furry Animals "Battersea Odyssey" (2007)
Short sample from "Battersea Odyssey" to illustrate the difference in vocal delivery and writing style of chief singer and songwriter Gruff Rhys and other members of the band. The track was written, and features lead vocals by, guitarist Huw Bunford and is one of only two songs on the album not written or sung by Rhys.

The majority of the album was recorded at Miraval Studios, France, picked, at keyboardist Cian Ciaran's request, because of its large live room which enabled all the band to set up and play as a group. The Super Furries wanted to "go somewhere new and have a cultural experience" while they recorded what is their eighth album together. Recording in France also enabled the band to get away from distractions such as "clean[ing] the house". Additional recording took place at Rockfield Studios, Monmouth while string instruments were recorded at Metropolis Studios, London.

After working with producer Mario Caldato Jr. on their previous albums, Phantom Power and Love Kraft, the band "were looking for someone new to work with" as they didn't want to repeat these records. They chose Dave Newfeld to produce Hey Venus!, after hearing his work with Canadian indie rock supergroup Broken Social Scene:

We were listening to the last Broken Social Scene record and we kind of looked at each other because we had been discussing producers. But, more specifically, we were looking for producers who could work with five really opinionated people who don't think alike, you know? ... We were thinking, 'Wow, BSS are a band with lots of members. It must be nuts making those records. Let's see if he's available.'

Rhys has praised Newfeld for his "knowledge of pop and what makes people react" stating that "most of the time he just stood there by the desk" and "wouldn't accept a take until he was physically moved by it".

As with Love Kraft Rhys was not the sole writer; guitarist Huw Bunford wrote "Battersea Odyssey" (inspired by Battersea Power Station), while keyboard player Cian Ciaran wrote "Carbon Dating". Other members of the band contributed songs that do not appear on Hey Venus! but might "end up on the next record". Newfeld also encouraged the group to improvise songs, two of which, "Semi Pro" and "Hot Nutz", appear briefly on footage of the recording process streamed at the band's website and included with American editions of the album. Rhys claimed these tracks (along with 32 other improvised songs recorded during the Hey Venus! sessions) would "probably never be released" but give "a glimpse into the magic of the Super Furry Animals in the studio, and the kind of atmosphere that Dave created". However, "Hot Nutz" was reworked as "Moped Eyes" for their next album, Dark Days/Light Years.

Some of the songs recorded barely resemble their earlier demo versions including "Baby Ate My Eightball", which originally "had this sort of Miami based rhythm with babies crying and glasses smashing" and was "very abrasive". The finished track (which features Huw Bunford "impersonating a police or ambulance siren with the backing vocals") was mixed three or four times and "barely resembles the original".

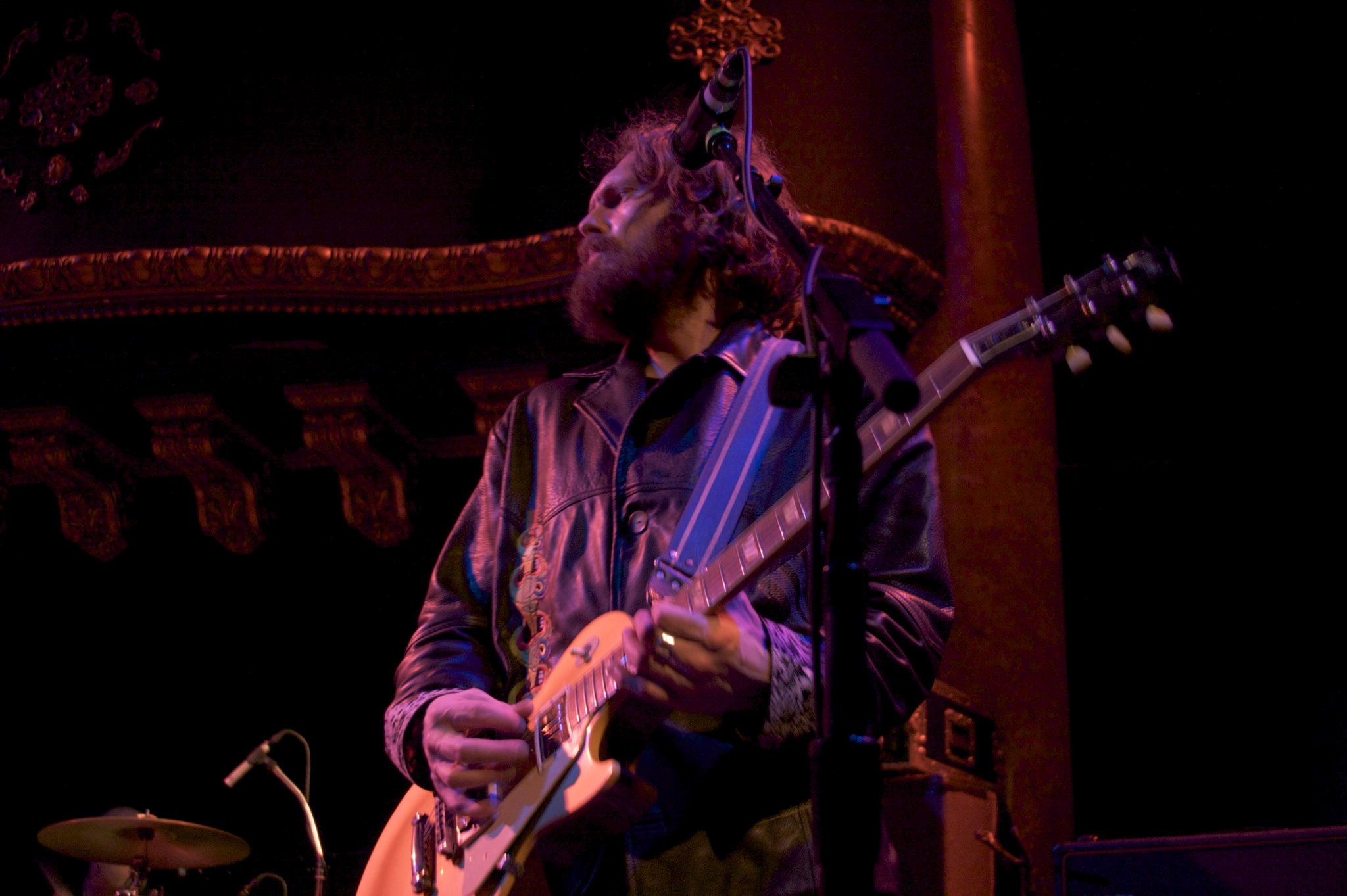
Huw Bunford performing with the Super Furry Animals at the Great American Music Hall, San Francisco, California on 9 February 2008 in support of Hey Venus!

Hey Venus! reflected the group's desire to "capture the spirit of the band playing live in a room". The album was recorded "very quickly" and, as the band did not feel the need to "experiment so much with such a simple record", is not particularly "sonically adventurous". In Gruff Rhys's words Hey Venus! is "a straight up album of songs ... with key changes and a live band playing them" with more emphasis "on songs than the arrangement". According to Rhys "nobody brought samplers into the studio, so there's far less electronics than on a lot of our records ... a lot of electronic music is quite a solitary pursuit. You sit at your computer or sampler and sometimes it's more of an individual kind of thing. Whereas with this record, we were trying to play as a band: a five people at once kind of record."

Along with the bass, drums and guitar, several other instruments were used during recording including a dulcimer (for its "sixties spy movie sound"), an electric saz (on "Into the Night"), an "electric-sitar box" ("Like a drum machine for Indian musicians") and a harpsichord which, according to Guto Pryce, was used on a lot of songs "because it was there [Miraval studios], and it was more in tune than the pianos". The latter had a strong influence on the album with Rhys stating: "when we found the harpsichord everything started to go 1960s... and we kind of followed that feeling..." Although Gruff Rhys had initially told fans to expect a "speaker-blowing" LP the addition of instruments such as the harpsichord meant this was not the case; the album instead highlights the band's "musical sweet tooth".

The band enlisted the help of several musicians when making the album including string arranger Sean O'Hagan (of The High Llamas), percussionist Kris Jenkins and others who the group have "built up relationships with over the years... the brass players we've toured with a lot ... Sean O'Hagan ... brought his string section in ... they've played on almost all our records".

Sixteen songs were recorded for the album with only 11 making the final cut. The band made a conscious decision to keep the number of tracks, and therefore the running time of Hey Venus!, down "because the last three albums have been almost an hour-long". At just over 36 minutes, the album is the shortest full-length release by the band. Some of the songs left off the record were "really heavy and raw" as a result of which Gruff Rhys feels Hey Venus! is "more consistent with our back catalog". Both lead single "Show Your Hand" and "Suckers!" were originally cut from the album, for being "too generic" and too "obvious ... melodically" respectively, until the band was persuaded to reconsider. Rough Trade Records boss Geoff Travis told the group that "Show Your Hand" was his favorite song and, following the tracks reworking to include a French horn part, it was reinstated. Similarly "Suckers!" was "really pushed" by producer Dave Newfeld until it too took its place on Hey Venus!.

The album was mixed by Chris Shaw and the Super Furry Animals at Rockfield Studios and the band's own studio, Pleasurefoxxx, in Cardiff with Dave Newfeld performing additional mixing duties on "Suckers!" Mastering was undertaken by Greg Calbi at Sterling Sound, New York.

Rhys has claimed to be particularly pleased with "Into the Night" (which "was kind of where my head was at, which is quite a ridiculous place to be") and "Carbon Dating" ("probably the most beautiful song on the record") while Huw Bunford has described the album as "one of [the] best records we've ever made".

== Themes ==
The album documents the life and adventures of a character called Venus as she moves "from a small town to a big metropolis". The band has been consistent when describing this central story of "running away from relationships, breaking up in a small town, moving to the big city, losing yourself, having your innocence completely corrupted, and living to tell the tale as a wiser person", however, several conflicting explanations have been given for the appearance of this narrative arc. Chief songwriter Gruff Rhys has claimed that Hey Venus! was conceived as a concept album:

At lot of the songs have the same central theme ... Some songs link up to that story more than others, but some were left off the record, they'll be on the next one, which we're working on already. It started off as a concept, but then we chose songs for their merit rather than their themes.

However, both drummer Dafydd Ieuan and Rhys himself have contradicted this statement, Ieuan stating that, although there are "a number of crossovers between songs ... the similarities are more because all the songs were written during a certain period of time", while Rhys claimed, in an interview with the Chicago Sun-Times, that he only noticed the similar themes running through the songs after he had written them:

I came up with the idea of the kind of applying all of these different stories to this Venus character as a way of making this character represent all of these personal songs ... It was more a way of structuring and compiling the album after the songs had already been written than writing a concept album per se.

A third explanation was provided by Rhys during an interview with American music magazine ALARM when he claimed that the concept only came about when sleeve designer Keiichi Tanaami asked what the album was about:

... We said all the songs were postcards from the life of this character Venus, who we fished out from a song called "Into the Night". So we applied the whole record to her, and it meant Mr. Tanaami could have a reference point to make an illustration.

After the Super Furry Animals had decided to call the album Hey Venus! they remembered "slightly too late" that the name had already been used by Northern Irish band That Petrol Emotion for a single taken from their Chemicrazy LP. However, as Rhys and Guto Pryce in particular were fans of the band, they reasoned that it "wasn't necessarily a bad thing to share a name" with the song.

== Cover ==
Hey Venus! is the first Super Furry Animals studio album since 1996's Fuzzy Logic without a cover designed by Pete Fowler. Instead, the band hired Japanese artist Keiichi Tanaami to produce the artwork for the album. According to bassist Guto Pryce the band was "blown away" by Tanaami's art during a tour of Japan a few years before the release of Hey Venus!:

We love psychedelic art anyway, and this guy had a Japanese take on it. It's just something we suggested - he does the sleeve - and through a system of lawyers and translators, he actually said yes.

The story of the Venus character helped the band give something to Tanaami that he "could read and maybe translate into a visual representation". After hearing the album the artist came up with something "quite mental" according to Huw Bunford, who went on to state "it's amazing what he obviously heard in the music".

The album cover received some criticism from journalists but Gruff Rhys has called it "great" and claims to love the fact that the "graphics and the words are placed in kind of, what seem to be random places ... it's not a predictable record cover, it doesn't look like an album by the Editors or something".

== Release ==
Hey Venus! was released on CD, vinyl and as a digital download on 27 August 2007 in the United Kingdom and was the band's first release for the new label Rough Trade Records. In the United States the album's release was staggered with vinyl and download versions being made available on 28 August 2007 and the CD version being released on 22 January 2008. The latter came packaged with a bonus CD containing the b-sides of the "Show Your Hand" and "Run-Away" singles as well as video footage of the band recording the improvised songs "Semi-Professional" and "Hot Nutz" at Miraval Studios. Hey Venus! reached number 11 on the UK Albums Chart and number 19 on Billboard magazine's Top Heatseekers chart.

"Neo Cosumer" impacted US radio on 22 January 2008. "Show Your Hand" and "Run-Away" were released as singles in the UK although neither reached the Top 40 of the UK Singles Chart. "The Gift That Keeps Giving" was given away as a free download from the band's website on Christmas Day 2007.

Region	Date	Label	Format	Catalogue
United Kingdom	27 August 2007	Rough Trade Records	Vinyl record	RTRADLP 346
United Kingdom	27 August 2007	Rough Trade Records	Compact disc	RTRADCD 346
United Kingdom	27 August 2007	Rough Trade Records	Download	—
United States	28 August 2007	Rough Trade America	Vinyl record	RT-346-1
United States	28 August 2007	Rough Trade America	Download	RT-346-5
United States	22 January 2008	Rough Trade America	Double compact disc	RTRADCD 423
Japan	12 September 2007	Rough Trade Japan	Compact disc	XQCY-1003

== Critical response ==
Professional ratings
Aggregate scores
Source	Rating
Metacritic	77/100
Review scores
Source	Rating
AllMusic	4.5/5 stars
The A.V. Club	A
The Guardian	4/5 stars
NME	8/10
musicOMH	4/5 stars
Pitchfork	7.8/10
Q	3/5 stars
Stylus Magazine	B−
The Times	4/5 stars
Uncut	3/5 stars

Hey Venus! received a generally favourable reception from critics with The Independent stating that the album "marks a welcome return to form for the Furries" and is "fit to challenge Rings Around the World and Phantom Power as their most satisfying work" and Artrocker calling it the Super Furry Animals' "eighth excellent album in a row". AllMusic hailed Hey Venus! as a "full-fledged return to pop power ... by far the tightest record SFA has released since Radiator" while Yahoo! Music UK claimed the album is "among the greatest things [the Super Furry Animals] have ever done". London's Time Out described Hey Venus! as "a treasure trove of left-of-centre sun-pop that, by rights, should see them back on the radio all day, every day" and the NME claimed that the "melodies on Hey Venus! are certain to ensnare new hearts in a way hardly any bands who've been around as long as the Furries can".

However, some reviews pointed out that the album has the "faint whiff of musical conservatism" with both Uncut and Q calling it a "missed opportunity", the former going on to describe the record as "a consolidation of affairs rather than a step forward" and suggesting that, "while no means a stinker" it "must rank as their least adventurous" LP. AllMusic countered this opinion, stating that Hey Venus! contains the kind of "subtle innovations that prove that the Furries can still surprise as they enter their second decade":

The focus is solely on the song, with each of the 11 tracks standing on its own yet working together to create an addictive 37-minute pop album ... just because this is disciplined in a way that Super Furry Animals haven't been in years doesn't mean they've ceased to progress.

The track "Run-Away" was singled out for praise by several publications with the Independent on Sunday calling the song "outstanding", Culture Deluxe claiming the track showed the Super Furries at "their pop-best" and proved they "could do no wrong" and the NME stating that "with a chorus as big as guitarist Huw Bunford's new serial-killer beard, it's up there with the most finely polished weapons in the SFA armoury". "Baby Ate My Eightball" received some criticism, with The Independent claiming that it "falls short of expectations, its limp disco groove providing uncertain footing for Rhys's rococo confection of harmonies" and Uncut stating that the song, along with "Neo Consumer", doesn't "tell us anything we didn't already know" about the band.

=== Accolades ===
Publication	Country	Accolade	Year	Rank
Iguana Music	Spain	Best albums 2007	2007	93
NME	United Kingdom	Albums of 2007	2007	35
Record Collector	United Kingdom	New release albums 2007	2007	*
Uncut	United Kingdom	Uncut 50 best albums of 2007	2007	17

* denotes an unordered list

== Tour ==
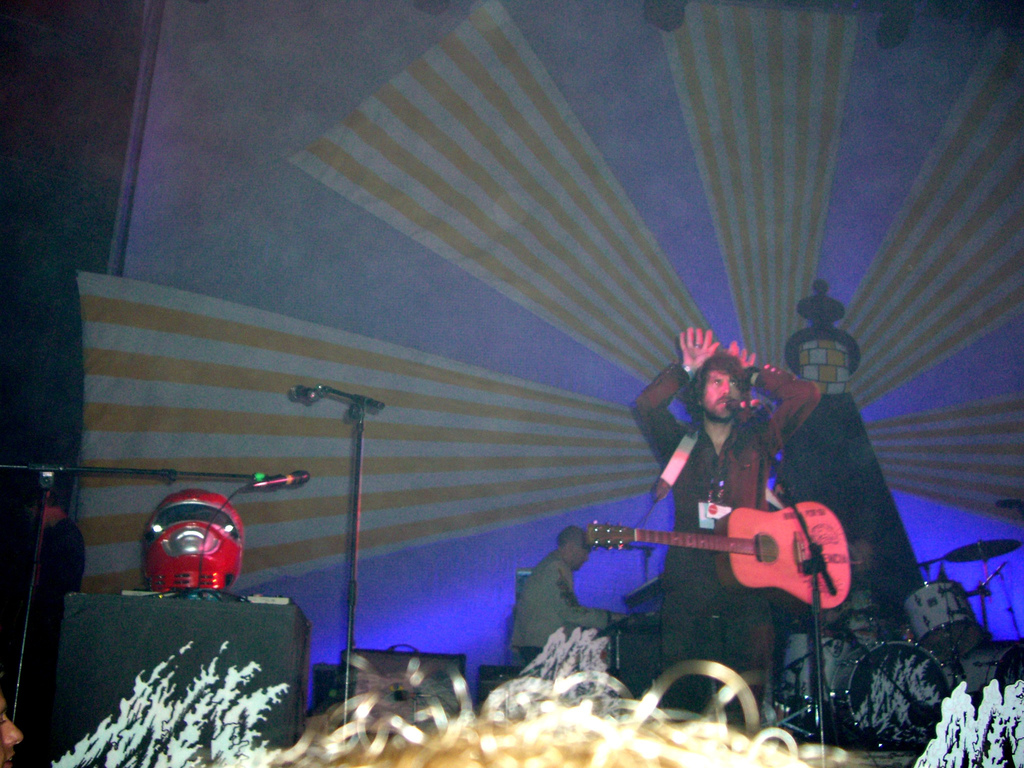
During shows on the Hey Venus! tour the band played in front of a backdrop featuring the lighthouse from Tanaami's cover art.

Following the release of Hey Venus! in the United Kingdom the Super Furry Animals embarked on an 11 date tour of Great Britain and Ireland, ending with two shows at London's Roundhouse. The group visited Japan and Europe before a US and Canadian tour in January and February 2008 during which fans could vote for songs they wanted to hear by using a "voting widget" on the blog page of the Super Furries' American record label, Beggars Banquet US.

The band decided to keep the Hey Venus! tour simple as the elaborate stage designs and costumes used on previous tours tended to wipe out any profits created, resulting in "financial melt-down" for the group in 2006. Huw Bunford told a Times journalist in August 2007 that the tour would be "like that bit at the end of the Mike Yarwood shows where he said, 'And this is me', no gim-micks. Just us." Despite this the band did perform in front of a backdrop featuring the lighthouse from Tanaami's cover art and frequently wore hand-tailored suits, featuring patches designed by Tanaami, during shows.

== Track listing ==
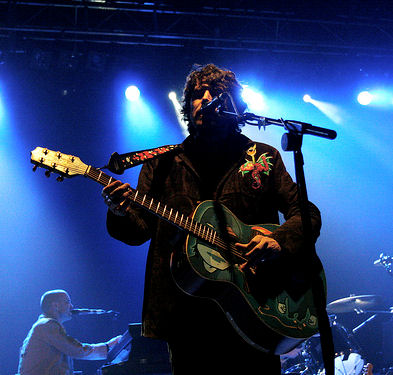
Super Furry Animals performing live in Barcelona, Spain in 2007 in support of Hey Venus! From left to right: Cian Ciaran, Gruff Rhys

All tracks are written by Super Furry Animals. Lead vocals by Gruff Rhys unless otherwise stated.

No.	Title	Length
1.	"The Gateway Song"	0:43
2.	"Run-Away"	2:53
3.	"Show Your Hand"	2:51
4.	"The Gift That Keeps Giving"	3:19
5.	"Neo Consumer"	2:03
6.	"Into the Night"	3:32
7.	"Baby Ate My Eight Ball"	3:35
8.	"Carbon Dating"	4:35
9.	"Suckers!"	4:05
10.	"Battersea Odyssey"	4:07
11.	"Let the Wolves Howl at the Moon"	4:41

American release bonus CD
No.	Title	Length
1.	"Never More"	2:25
2.	"Aluminium Illuminati"	2:37
3.	"These Bones"	3:23
4.	"That's What I'm Talking About"	5:41
5.	"Hot Nutz/Semi-Pro"	6:23

== Personnel ==
The following people contributed to Hey Venus!:

Band

- Gruff Rhys – Lead vocals, rhythm guitar, electric saz, organ
- Huw Bunford – Lead guitar, backing vocals, lead vocals on "Battersea Odyssey"
- Guto Pryce – Bass guitar
- Cian Ciaran – Keyboards, backing vocals, lead vocals on "Carbon Dating"
- Dafydd Ieuan – Drums, backing vocals

Recording personnel

- Dave Newfeld – Production, additional mixing on "Suckers!"
- Myriam Correge – Recording assistant (Miraval Studios)
- Richard Matthews – Recording assistant (Rockfield Studios)
- Phil Ault – Recording assistant (Rockfield Studios)
- Chris Shaw – Mixing
- Super Furry Animals – Mixing
- Simon Dawson – Mixing assistant (Pleasurefoxxx Studios)
- Richard Matthews – Mixing assistant (Rockfield Studios)
- Greg Calbi – Mastering (Sterling Sound, New York)

Artwork

- Keiichi Tanaami – Artwork
- The Bait – Layout

Additional musicians

- Kris Jenkins – Percussion (Tracks 1, 2, 4, 6, 7, 8, 9, 10, 11)
- Gary Alesbrook – Trumpet (3, 4, 7, 10)
- Nick Atwood – Trombone (3, 4, 7, 10, 11)
- Martin Owen – French horn (3)
- Phil Woods – French Horn (3)
- Kathryn Saunders – French Horn (3)
- Matt Sibley – Saxophone (4, 7, 10)
- Brian Wright – Violin (3, 8)
- Charles Nolan – Violin (3, 8)
- Rick Koster – Violin (3, 8)
- Laura Melhuish – Violin (3, 8)
- Amanda Britton – Violin (3, 8)
- Sally Herbert – Violin (3, 8)
- Marcus Holloway – Cello (3, 8)
- Ian Burdge – Cello (3, 8)
- Sean O'Hagan – String arrangements
- Super Furry Animals – String arrangements

== Album chart positions ==
Chart	Peak position
European Top 100 Albums	40
Ireland Albums Chart	16
U.S. Top Heatseekers	19
U.S. Top Heatseekers (Northeast)	5
UK Albums Chart	11
UK Independent Albums Chart	2
