= Dark Days/Light Years =

Studio album by Super Furry Animals
- Released: 16 March 2009
- Recorded: 2007–2009
- Studio: Faster Recording Studio, Cardiff
- Genre: Alternative rock, experimental rock
- Length: 59:54
- Label: Rough Trade
- Producer: Chris Shaw, Super Furry Animals

Super Furry Animals chronology
Hey Venus! (2007)	Dark Days/Light Years (2009)	Zoom! The Best of 1995–2016 (2016)

Alternative cover art
- Vinyl cover art

Dark Days/Light Years is the ninth studio album by Super Furry Animals, released digitally on 16 March 2009 via the band's website, with a physical release following on 21 April on Rough Trade Records. The album's title is taken from a lyric in the song "Moped Eyes" ("dark days seem light years away").

Many of the songs on the album are based on riffs and grooves the band had been working on for several years. The band originally planned to record the album in Miraval, France like their previous effort Hey Venus!, but decided to record in Cardiff with a considerably lower budget than previous efforts.

The completion of the album was documented by a series of 22 short films that were shown on the Super Furry Animals website, with one film added each day leading up to its original digital release. The videos were inspired by the Mike Figgis film Timecode and were described by The Guardian as "at once enormously dull, pleasingly insightful and curiously compelling."

Longtime sleeve designer Pete Fowler collaborated with Hey Venus! artist Keiichi Tanaami to produce the album's artwork. According to Rhys, Tanaami wanted to work with the band having seen Fowler's previous Super Furry Animals record sleeves. The track "Inaugural Trams" includes spoken word German vocals by Franz Ferdinand's Nick McCarthy. The song impacted radio on April 21, 2009. The band broadcast a live show on their own website (superfurry.com) featuring songs from the album on the day of its digital release, which proved a success despite initial technical glitches. They didn't tour the album in a conventional manner, gigging infrequently.

The 12" vinyl release features different artwork from the CD version, and also has a free copy of the album on CD slipped inside the sleeve. The album peaked at #23 in the UK Album Charts in its first week of physical release. It may have charted higher but the band sold a number of pre-order copies and digital downloads via their website, which is not a registered chart company.

At just over an hour, it is the band's longest album.

To promote the album, lead singer Gruff Rhys described it as having a "biblical sound," and said that the band wouldn't be able to play any of its songs indoors.

== Lyrical themes ==
Singer and chief lyric writer Gruff Rhys has claimed that "The Very Best of Neil Diamond" is about how you can't choose the soundtrack to your life" while "Inaugural Trams" is "a celebratory anthem regarding the opening of a new tram line in a fictitious utopian mainland Europe town". The current economic downturn is referenced briefly in songs such as "Inaugural Trams" and "Inconvenience". Rhys has described the writing process as "very collaborative".

== Musical style ==
According to Rhys the band made a "conscious decision really was not to include the slow numbers" on Dark Days/Light Years going on to state that "There are not a whole lot of chords in these songs; they're not as song-based in the conventional song writing. They've been developed out of band jams, but it turned out sounding like songs pretty much anyway".

== Critical reception ==
Professional ratings
Aggregate scores
Source	Rating
AnyDecentMusic?	7.3/10
Metacritic	84/100
Review scores
Source	Rating
AllMusic	4/5 stars
The Boston Phoenix	4/4 stars
The Guardian	4/5 stars
Mojo	4/5 stars
NME	8/10
Pitchfork	8.3/10
Q	4/5 stars
Spin	5/10
The Sunday Times	4/5 stars
Uncut	4/5 stars

Dark Days/Light Years received generally positive reviews, with Metacritic, which assigns a normalized rating out of 100 to reviews from mainstream critics, giving the album a score of 84 denoting "universal acclaim".

== Track listing ==
All tracks are written by Super Furry Animals, unless otherwise stated.

No.	Title	Lead vocals	Length
1.	"Crazy Naked Girls"	Gruff Rhys/Huw Bunford	6:15
2.	"Mt."	Cian Ciaran	4:25
3.	"Moped Eyes"	Rhys	4:13
4.	"Inaugural Trams"	Rhys	5:19
5.	"Inconvenience"	Rhys	3:42
6.	"Cardiff in the Sun"	Rhys	8:16
7.	"The Very Best of Neil Diamond"	Rhys	4:14
8.	"Helium Hearts"	Rhys/Ciaran	2:50
9.	"White Socks/Flip Flops"	Bunford	5:09
10.	"Where Do You Wanna Go?"	Rhys	2:28
11.	"Lliwiau Llachar"	Rhys	3:12
12.	"Pric"	Ciaran	9:52

== Personnel ==
The following people contributed to Dark Days/Light Years:

=== Band ===
- Gruff Rhys – vocals, guitar, electric saz, vocoder, keyboard
- Huw Bunford – guitar, bass guitar, electric saz, vocals
- Guto Pryce – bass guitar
- Cian Ciaran – keyboards, electronics, guitar, vocals
- Dafydd Ieuan – drums, vocals

=== Additional musicians ===
- Nick McCarthy – spoken word on "Inaugural Trams"
- Kris Jenkins – percussion
- Jessica Rochman – strings

=== Recording personnel ===
- Chris Shaw – co-producer, mixing, engineering
- Super Furry Animals – co-producer
- Dave Newfeld – recording of intro to "Crazy Naked Girls" (Miraval Studios)
- Stuart Hawkes – mastering (Metropolis Mastering)

=== Artwork ===
- Keiichi Tanaami – artwork
- Pete Fowler – artwork

== Accolades ==
Publication	Country	Accolade	Year	Rank
Uncut	United Kingdom	Uncut 50 best albums of 2009	2009	2
