= The Gift That Keeps Giving =

Single by Super Furry Animals

from the album Hey Venus!
- Released: 25 December 2007
- Recorded: Miraval Studios, France
- Genre: Experimental rock
- Length: 3:20
- Label: Rough Trade Records
- Songwriter: Super Furry Animals
- Producer: Super Furry Animals with David Newfeld

Super Furry Animals singles chronology
| "Run-Away" (2007) | "The Gift That Keeps Giving" (2007) | "Inaugural Trams" (2009) |

"The Gift That Keeps Giving" is a song by Super Furry Animals taken from their 2007 album, Hey Venus!. It was given away as a free download single from the band's official website on Christmas Day 2007.

The song was conceived as a Christmas single as part of the band's plans to make a "pop record" in parent album Hey Venus! The title stems from sessions in 2004 for the extended live version of "The Man Don't Give a Fuck", at which the group's engineer repeatably used the phrase. Critical response to "The Gift That Keeps Giving" was generally positive with the NME claiming it to be one of the best songs on Hey Venus! and BBC Wales describing the track as "brain-bendingly catchy".

A Team D.A.D.D.Y. directed music video was made to accompany the track's release as a single. The video features a spoilt child being showered with Christmas presents while poorer children are shown in tears due to their lack of gifts. Two different endings for the video were produced - in one Santa Claus is shown crucified on a cross while another sees Santa laid on the floor with an arrow through his head.

== Origins and recording ==
In a 2008 interview with Uncut singer Gruff Rhys stated that "The Gift That Keeps Giving" was written as an "AOR Christmas single" following a visit to Japan where "they celebrate Christmas as a commercial holiday with all the decorations .. in one store they had Santa on a cross hanging from the wall ... so the Christmas single was just an excuse to have Santa on a cross on the cover". Although the cover art did not in the end feature this scene, a crucified Santa does appear in the accompanying music video.

Speaking to British music magazine Artrocker Rhys offered another explanation as to the origins of the song:

Geoff Travis asked us for one of our pop records, so we thought a pop record should have a Christmas single. And we'd been playing around with this phrase, because we'd had a Scottish engineer who helped us make the 22 minute version of "The Man Don't Give a Fuck" and er... he always used to say 'it's the gift that keeps giving!' He was just referring to the length of the song... but we found out it's also a popular American shopping phrase.

The track was recorded at Miraval Studios, France along with the rest of Hey Venus!

== Musical structure ==
Super Furry Animals "The Gift That Keeps Giving" (2007)
Short sample from "The Gift That Keeps Giving" illustrating the track's chorus and outro.

"The Gift That Keeps Giving" is 3 minutes 20 seconds long and is in the key of D minor. The track begins with a phased guitar melody backed only by synthesizer, hi-hat and occasional guitar chords. Cian Ciaran's piano joins the mix as the song builds up with the introduction of drums at 25 seconds. Gruff Rhys begins singing after 39 seconds and is joined by sleighbells which accompany the lines "all the bells started ringing" shortly before the first chorus which features harmony backing vocals (the first of many in the "falsetto-laden" track) singing the title phrase. Another verse and chorus follow before an instrumental verse at 1 minute 46 seconds featuring a trumpet solo playing around the vocal melody. The song "crescendos tenderly" with a double chorus before entering the outro which initially includes spoken word backing vocals chanting "giving again" and is "enhanced by a horn section that the Furries seem to be able to utilise more effectively than anyone else".

== Critical response ==
Critical reaction to "The Gift That Keeps Giving" was generally positive with the New Musical Express rating it as one of the best on parent album Hey Venus!; "[it doesn't so much raise] the bar, as balances it on top of Mount Snowdon" going on to state: "From a foundation of ELO guitar cloud-swells, Gruff's Elvis Costello-in-a-bubblegum-bath voice wraps around tender trombone parps to create the band's most beautiful moment since "Demons". BBC Wales commented on the track's Christmas links, describing "The Gift That Keeps Giving" as a "mellow, mellifluous, slow ode to the joys of the festive season ... lyrically incredibly simple ... brain-bendingly catchy". The Guardian meanwhile, stated that the song "might sound more California than Christmas" but still possesses the "obligatory sleighbells ... shaken throughout". Much was made of the 'retro' nature of the track with Yahoo Music UK claiming that the song is "a pure blue-eyed soul tune, of the sort that Dan Penn and Spooner Oldham used to churn out four decades ago" and The Guardian describing it as a "gorgeous, Bacharach-tinged haze". In contrast the UCSD Guardian described "The Gift That Keeps Giving" as "jazzy" and "lo-fi" and saw it as "a throw-back to 2000's experimental Mwng".

Billboard noted that "the group's penchant for sonic flourishes is used to subtle effect" on "The Gift That Keeps Giving" and went on to suggest that the track is representative of Hey Venus! as a whole. Cokemachineglow, however, thought that the song "will be cast into the void, one daring, lonely piece of the first Super Furry Animals album to not succeed as a thorough unit" and, in their single review of "The Gift That Keeps Giving", the NME suggested that the track wasn't one of the group's best.

The band's decision to employ Japanese surrealist Keiichi Tanaami to produce the cover for Hey Venus! and its singles received some criticism, not least because the artist had already used similar designs. In a 2005 interview with German magazine Komakino, keyboard player Cian Ciaran stated that the artwork for "The Gift..." was unique, however, and praised the artist.

== Music video ==
One ending of the music video features Santa Claus crucified on a cross.

The video for "The Gift That Keeps Giving" was directed by Team D.A.D.D.Y. and revolves around a festive theme in keeping with the track's release date of Christmas day.

The video opens with a spoilt child opening numerous Christmas presents including a toy train, a box full of kittens and a copy of Hey Venus! (which he throws over his shoulder in disgust). Towards the end of the video less privileged children are shown crying at their lack of presents before we cut back to the initial child who is surrounded by gifts while Santa Claus is seen in front of a log fire, crucified on a cross. An alternative ending instead features Santa lying on the floor with an arrow through his head.

Despite the apparently cynical nature of the video, BBC Wales asserts that it is "not meant to be read in any deeper level than 'ain't Christmas brilliant?'"

== Track listing ==
All songs by Super Furry Animals.

  1. "The Gift That Keeps Giving" – 3:20

Although the track was initially reported to come with an "exclusive b-side" this turned out not to be the case and only "The Gift That Keeps Giving" was made available.

== Personnel ==
- Gruff Rhys: Vocals
- Huw Bunford: Guitar
- Guto Pryce: Bass guitar
- Cian Ciaran: keyboards
- Dafydd Ieuan: Drums
- Kris Jenkins: Percussion
- Matt Sibley: Saxophone
- Gary Alesbrook: Trumpet
- Nick Atwood: Trombone
