= Run-Away (Super Furry Animals song) =

Single by Super Furry Animals

from the album Hey Venus!
- Released: 29 October 2007
- Recorded: Miraval Studios, France
- Genre: Indie rock
- Length: 2:53
- Label: Rough Trade Records
- Songwriter: Super Furry Animals
- Producer: Super Furry Animals with David Newfeld

Super Furry Animals singles chronology
"Show Your Hand" (2007)	"Run-Away" (2007)	"The Gift That Keeps Giving" (2007)

"Run-Away" is a song by Super Furry Animals and the second single taken from their 2007 album, Hey Venus!. The song is an homage to the 'Wall of Sound' production made famous by Phil Spector, particularly in his work with 1960s girl groups.

"Run-Away" received many positive reviews from critics who variously described it as "absolutely timeless stuff", "outstanding" and "up there with the most finely polished weapons in the SFA armoury". The track's Phil Spector-leanings were also commented on by numerous journalists. A "spooky", "tongue-in-cheek" video was produced for the song directed by Richard Ayoade and starring his Garth Marenghi's Darkplace, The IT Crowd and The Mighty Boosh co-star Matt Berry.

== Origins and recording ==
In an interview with Tiny Mix Tapes in January 2008 Gruff Rhys admitted that "Run-Away" owed much to Phil Spector-type 'Wall of Sound' production: "The drumbeat is definitely a nod to that. We started collecting a lot of old 7-inch singles recently. Cian got heavy into doo-wop music and I was getting into late 60s girl groups. "Run-Away" came out of listening to "Be My Baby" too many times". Guto Pryce echoed this sentiment in an interview with Washington, D.C. website DCist stating that "on "Run Away" that was exactly what we were after, a fuzzy Phil Spector type thing. A dirty, grimy '60s pop song". The track was recorded at Miraval Studios, France along with the rest of Hey Venus!

== Musical structure ==
Super Furry Animals "Run-Away" (2007)
Short sample from "Run-Away" illustrating the track's middle 8 and chorus.

"Run-Away" is 2 minutes 53 seconds long and is in the key of B major. The "hook laden" song begins with a spoken word introduction from Gruff ("This song is based on a true story... which would be fine if it wasn't autobiographical") over a B chord playing on the "familiar "dum-de-dum-dum" Phil Spector drum beat" (from "Be My Baby") provided by drummer Dafydd Ieuan.

Lead guitar embellishments accompany the first verse before the track builds up to its first "falsetto laden" chorus at 34 seconds. Another verse follows, with additional percussion backing, during which Rhys mourns "we may have fought with teeth and nails, I still recall your banking details". A short breakdown middle 8 leads to a double chorus (the second of which features a key change to C-sharp major) before the song breaks down again and ends with Rhys singing "There's nothing that I could have said but cry, a little, lie, a little, die, just a little" over sparse musical backing.

== Critical response ==
"Run-Away" received much praise from reviewers with the Manchester Evening News claiming the track to be "absolutely timeless stuff", likening it to Gruff Rhys "swaggering up to the karaoke and picking out his favourite Roy Orbison ballad" and the NME stating that, "with a chorus as big as guitarist Huw Bunford's new serial-killer beard, it's up there with the most finely polished weapons in the SFA armoury". Website Culture Deluxe claimed the track showed the band at "their pop-best" and proved they "could do no wrong" while the Independent on Sunday called "Run-Away" "outstanding".

The Spector-like nature of the track was commented on in several reviews with British television station Channel 4 describing "Run-Away" as "Spector pop", BBC Wales describing the song as "a homage to gun-wielding production oddball Phil Spector", and Yahoo! Music in the UK and Ireland stating that the single "welds a killer falsetto chorus to a latterday incarnation of the 'Wall of Sound'".

Tiny Mix Tapes thought the "rousing and pleasant" song could have "found a home anywhere in or between Fuzzy Logic and 2005's Love Kraft" while Pitchfork Media thought the track's "ostensible real-life origins" would "render "Run-Away" one of the most heart-on-sleeve entries in a catalogue better known for left field classics like "Ice Hockey Hair" and "The Man Don't Give a Fuck"". B-sides, the "Beach Boys-influenced" "These Bones" and the "pulsating" "That's What I'm Talking About", were also singled out for praise by the Manchester Evening News. The Chronicle however, criticised "Run-Away" and previous single "Show Your Hand" for sounding "more like the generic pop songs one would find on the radio than those of a historically experimental band".

=== Accolades ===
Publication	Country	Accolade	Year	Rank
Iguana Music	Spain	Best singles 2007	2007	72
NME	United Kingdom	Singles of 2007	2007	21

== Music video ==
A screenshot from the music video showing 'Maria' (left) with Matt Berry (right)

The "tongue-in-cheek", video for "Run-Away" was directed by Richard Ayoade and features his Garth Marenghi's Darkplace, The IT Crowd and The Mighty Boosh co-star Matt Berry. The video begins with close-ups of Berry driving a vintage car on a moonlit night intercut with shots of a woman in a white dress running through sparse woodland. After 54 seconds Berry abruptly stops his car and the shot changes to show the woman in white laid on the road in front of his vehicle. Berry leaves his car and walks over to the woman who appears dazed. The next shot features the woman resting her head on Berry's shoulder while he drives.

Towards the middle of the video we find the pair sat together at a house party while Berry discusses the woman with his friends. Part of this conversation features subtitles, with Berry stating "She can't remember a thing". Immediately afterwards a man in a brown suit and bow tie enters, rubbing the back of his head and looking confused. He focuses on the woman in the white dress and says "Maria?" to which Berry counters "Who the heck are you?" while 'Maria' bites her lip and looks on guiltily. When the man in the suit states "That's my wife!" Berry gets to his feet and the man promptly punches him in the face. We then cut to shots of Berry running through the same woodland as 'Maria' earlier in the video. After around 20 seconds he looks to his left and is blinded by a light. The next shot shows him laid on the road in front of a car as its driver, a woman in a red coat, rushes to check on him. As the song comes to an end we see the women in red driving her car with Berry resting his head on her shoulder.

Music website Stereogum described the video as a "cheeky, soft-focused bit of '80s fun", while British alternative music radio station Xfm included it in their top ten videos of 2007, calling it "spooky, very tongue-in-cheek and utterly hilarious".

== Track listing ==
All songs by Super Furry Animals.

- CD (RTRADSCD419)
  1. "Run-Away" – 2:53
  2. "These Bones" – 3:23
  3. "That's What I'm Talking About" – 5:41
- 7" picture disc (RTRADS419)
  1. "Run-Away" – 2:53
  2. "These Bones" – 3:23

== Personnel ==
- Gruff Rhys: Vocals
- Huw Bunford: Guitar
- Guto Pryce: Bass guitar
- Cian Ciaran: keyboards
- Dafydd Ieuan: Drums
- Kris Jenkins: Percussion

== Singles chart positions ==
Chart	Peak position
UK Singles Chart	120
UK Indie (Official Charts)	1
