= Under the Influence (compilation album) =

British compilation album series

Under the Influence is a series of seven various-artist compilation albums released by DMC UK from 2003 to 2005. The tracks for each album are chosen by an artist or band to show the music that has influenced their work. UtI compilations have been compiled by Morrissey, Ian Brown, Paul Weller, Paul Heaton, Bob Geldof, Super Furry Animals, and Carl Barât. Each album has sleeve notes written by the compiler discussing the tracks selected.

== Morrissey (2003) ==
  1. The Sundown Playboys - "Saturday Nite Special" (1972; a rare Apple Records recording; first time on CD)
  2. The New York Dolls - "Trash" (1973)
  3. Nat Couty - "Woodpecker Rock" (1958)
  4. Diana Dors - "So Little Time" (1964)
  5. Ludus - "Breaking the Rules" (1983)
  6. Charlie Feathers - "One Hand Loose" (1956)
  7. T. Rex - "Great Horse" (1970)
  8. Jimmy Radcliffe - "(There Goes) The Forgotten Man" (1962)
  9. Jaybee Wasden - "De Castrow" (1959)
  10. Ramones - "Judy Is a Punk" (1976)
  11. Sparks - "Arts & Crafts Spectacular" (1972)
  12. The Cats - "Swan Lake" (1968)
  13. Nico - "All That Is My Own" (1970)
  14. Patti Smith - "Hey Joe" (1974)
  15. Klaus Nomi - "Death" (1982)

== Ian Brown (2003) ==
  1. GZA - "Liquid Swords"
  2. Brand Nubian - "Meaning of the 5%"
  3. Burning Spear - "Man in the Hills"
  4. Junior Byles - "Fade Away"
  5. Buju Banton - "Complaint"
  6. The Clash - "(White Man) In Hammersmith Palais"
  7. Papa Levi - "Mi God Mi King"
  8. Sizzla - "No Other Like Jah"
  9. Cymande - "Fug"
  10. Edwin Starr - "T.I.M.E."
  11. Isley Bros - "Take Some Time Out for Love"
  12. Osiris - "War on the Bullshit"
  13. Larry Williams - "Too Late"
  14. Bobby Womack - "Across 110th St"
  15. The De-lites - "Lover"
  16. Dorothy Love Coates - "99½"

== Paul Weller (2003) ==
  1. Little Richard - "Slippin & Slidin"
  2. The Headhunters - "God Made Me Funky"
  3. Richie Havens - "Handouts in the Rain"
  4. D'Angelo - "Devils Pie"
  5. Charles Mingus - "Passions of a Man"
  6. The Casuals - "Jesamine"
  7. The Winstons - "Color Him Father"
  8. John Holt - "Ali Baba"
  9. Funkdoobiest - "Doobie to the Head"
  10. Marvin Gaye - "Pretty Little Baby"
  11. The Blind Boys of Alabama - "Jesus Gonna Be Here"
  12. The Kinks - "Big Black Smoke"
  13. Five Stairsteps - "We Must Be in Love"
  14. The Wailers - "Small Axe"
  15. Big Youth - "Hit the Road Jack"
  16. John Coltrane - "Olé"

== Paul Heaton (2004) ==
  1. Pepe Deluxé - "Super Sound"
  2. Calvin Boze & His All Stars - "Safronia B"
  3. Willie Nelson - "Valentine"
  4. Lee Dorsey - "Who's Gonna Help Brother Get Further"
  5. Ugly Duckling - "A Little Samba"
  6. The Hues Corporation - "Freedom for the Stallion"
  7. Al Green - "All 'n' All"
  8. Manu Chao - "Bongo Bong' / 'Je Ne T'aime Plus"
  9. Bobbie Gentry - "Papa Won't You Let Me Go to Town"
  10. Tower of Power - "It's Not the Crime"
  11. Syreeta - "I Wanna Be By Your Side"
  12. Lavern Baker - "You're the Boss"
  13. City High - "15 Will Get You 20"
  14. Elvis Costello - "Lipstick Vogue"
  15. Hem - "Lazy Eye"
  16. Randy Travis - "Forever and Ever, Amen"

== Bob Geldof (2004) ==
Geldof described his collection as "the in-car comp that I'd play on some 80-minute journey and each track would make me happier in direct proportion to every inch traveled".

  1. Jay Blackton & Orchestra - "Overture to Oklahoma (edit)"
  2. Cliff Richard - "Apron Strings"
  3. Dr. Feelgood - "All Through the City"
  4. Television - "Venus"
  5. The Velvet Underground - "New Age"
  6. Roxy Music - "Do the Strand"
  7. New York Dolls - "Personality Crisis"
  8. The Who - "Pictures of Lily"
  9. John Prine - "The Late John Garfield Blues"
  10. Webb Pierce - "In the Jailhouse Now"
  11. Kris Kristofferson - "The Pilgrim Chapter 33"'
  12. Bob Dylan - "Visions of Johanna"
  13. Max Romeo - "War Ina Babylon"
  14. Small Faces - "All or Nothing"
  15. Graham Parker & the Rumour - "You Can't Be Too Strong"
  16. The Kinks - "Dead End Street"
  17. David Bowie - "Drive in Saturday"
  18. Four Tops - "Reach Out I'll Be There"
  19. Leonard Cohen - "Famous Blue Raincoat"

== Super Furry Animals (2005) ==
For the Super Furry Animals album, each member of the group chose 3 tracks to be included.

  1. The Beach Boys - "Feel Flows" (chosen by Huw Bunford)
  2. Undertones - "My Perfect Cousin" (chosen by Huw Bunford)
  3. Datblygu - "Casserole Efeilliaid" (chosen by Gruff Rhys)
  4. Gorky's Zygotic Mynci - "Christina" (chosen by Gruff Rhys)
  5. Sly & the Family Stone - "Family Affair" (chosen by Dafydd Ieuan)
  6. Dawn Penn - "You Don't Love Me (No, No, No)" (chosen by Guto Pryce)
  7. Electric Light Orchestra - "Telephone Line" (chosen by Dafydd Ieuan)
  8. Dennis Wilson and Rumbo - "Lady" (chosen by Guto Pryce)
  9. Meic Stevens - "Ghost Town" (chosen by Gruff Rhys)
  10. MC5 - "Kick Out the Jams" (chosen by Guto Pryce)
  11. Bizet - "Pearl Fishers" (chosen by Cian Ciaran)
  12. Underworld - "Rez" (chosen by Dafydd Ieuan)
  13. Humanoid - "Stakker Humanoid" (chosen by Cian Ciaran)
  14. Joey Beltram - "Energy Flash" (chosen by Cian Ciaran)
  15. Hardfloor - "Acperience" (chosen by Huw Bunford)

== Carl Barât (2005) ==
  1. The Mamas & the Papas - "Dream a Little Dream"
  2. David Bowie - "Oh! You Pretty Things"
  3. Bob Dylan - "Hurricane"
  4. Small Faces - "The Universal"
  5. The Las - "Son of a Gun"
  6. Supergrass - "Sitting Up Straight"
  7. New York Dolls - "Personality Crisis"
  8. The Clash - "Remote Control"
  9. The Jam - "Eton Rifles"
  10. The Stranglers - "No More Heroes"
  11. The Specials - "Too Much Too Young"
  12. The Smiths - "Bigmouth Strikes Again"
  13. Moldy Peaches - "Who's Got the Crack"
  14. Pulp - "Sorted for E's & Wizz"
  15. The Streets - "Fit But You Know It"
