= Beautiful mistake =

Beautiful mistake may refer to:

- A homewrecker
- The Beautiful Mistake, an American post-hardcore band with an eponymous EP
- Beautiful Mistake (film), a 2000 British music documentary by Marc Evans
- "Beautiful Mistakes", a 2021 song by Maroon 5 featuring Megan Thee Stallion
