= The Peth =

Welsh rock band

- Origin: Cardiff, Wales
- Genres: Rock
- Years active: 2008–present
- Label: Strangetown
- Members: Rhys Ifans; Dafydd Ieuan; Guto Pryce; Dic Ben; Meilyr Gwynedd; Osian Gwynedd; Mick Hilton; Kris Jenkins
- Website: thepeth.com

The Peth (English language: The Thing) are a Welsh rock music supergroup band formed in Cardiff in 2008 by Super Furry Animals drummer Dafydd Ieuan as "an excuse to spend large chunks of his time in a recording studio" while other members of the Super Furry Animals were busy with solo projects. Ieuan asked actor, and former Super Furry Animals lead singer, Rhys Ifans to provide vocals for several tracks he had written, and recruited eight other people for the group, including Super Furry Animals bassist Guto Pryce, Meilyr Gwynedd, Osian Gwynedd, Mick Hilton, Dic Ben and Kris Jenkins. Ben was in an early incarnation of the Super Furry Animals along with Ifans, while Jenkins frequently plays percussion for the Super Furries and has appeared on all the group's albums since 2001's Rings Around the World as well as contributing to the 1999 single "Northern Lites".

The group played their first concerts in 2008 in low-key venues in Wales before gigging in London and performing at that year's Green Man Festival. Debut album The Golden Mile was released in August 2008 to mixed reviews. The record's title refers to "the mile between the group's studio and the Grangetown region of Cardiff". A second album, Crystal Peth has been recorded but has yet to be released.

In 2009 The Peth supported Oasis at a concert in Cardiff's Millennium Stadium.
