= Beautiful Mistake (film) =

- Directed by: Marc Evans
- Written by: Marc Evans
- Produced by: Phillip King; D. Gethin Scourfield; Kieran Corrigan
- Starring: James Dean Bradfield; Huw Bunford; John Cale; Euros Childs; Cian Ciaran and Cerys Matthews
- Cinematography: Ashley Rowe
- Music by: John Cale
- Distributed by: Merlin Films
- Release date: 29 November 2000 (UK)
- Running time: 75 minutes
- Country: United Kingdom
- Language: English

Beautiful Mistake (Welsh: Camgymeriad Gwych) is a 2000 British music documentary film directed by Marc Evans starring James Dean Bradfield, Huw Bunford and Cian Ciaran.

== Synopsis ==
This documentary film follows a group of Welsh musicians interacting and playing in the studio. Premiered at the Cardiff International Film Festival in November 2000.

== Cast ==
- James Dean Bradfield as himself
- Huw Bunford as himself
- John Cale as himself
- Euros Childs as himself
- Megan Childs as herself
- Cian Ciaran as himself
- Dafydd Ieuan as himself
- Richard James as himself
- Patrick Jones as himself
- Cerys Matthews as herself
- Guto Pryce as himself
- Gruff Rhys as himself
