= Bing Bong (song) =

Single by Super Furry Animals
- Released: 13 May 2016
- Genre: Experimental rock
- Length: 5:19
- Label: Rough Trade
- Songwriter(s): Korki Buchek

Super Furry Animals singles chronology
"Inaugural Trams" (2009)	"Bing Bong" (2016)

"Bing Bong" is a single by the Super Furry Animals, released on 13 May 2016. The song was originally written for Euro 2004 but not released until the Euro 2016 campaign of the Wales national football team.

== Reception ==
The song was referred to by NME as "a bonkers track, of course, which is absolutely apt for a band that always had a strong sense of the surreal" and "a brilliant epilogue for a singular career". They further suggested the single may be the last release by the band.

The track also appeared on the 2016 compilation "Zoom! The Best of 1995–2016".
