= Keiichi Tanaami =

Japanese artist (1936–2024)

- 田名網 敬一
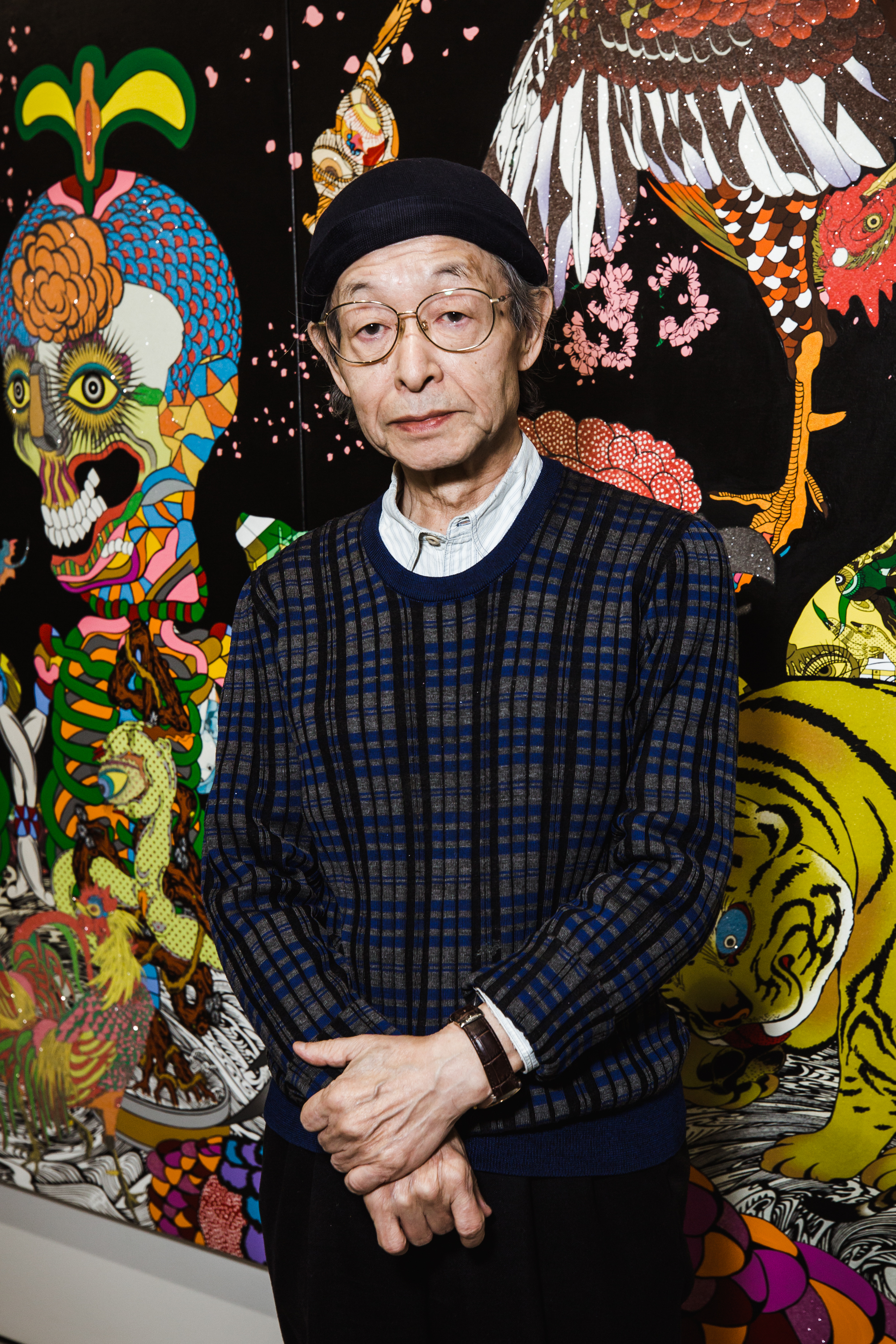
- Tanaami in 2017
- Born: 21 July 1936; Tokyo, Japan
- Died: 9 August 2024 (aged 88)
- Occupations: Graphic designer, illustrator, video artist and fine artist

Keiichi Tanaami (21 July 1936 – 9 August 2024) was a Japanese pop artist who was active as multi-genre artist from the 1960s as a graphic designer, illustrator, video artist and fine artist.

== Early life and career ==
Keiichi Tanaami was born in Tokyo on 21 July 1936, as the eldest son of a textile wholesaler. He was 9 years old when Tokyo was bombed during the Great Tokyo Air Raid of World War II in 1945. Images seared into the back of his mind at this time would become major motifs in his art works: roaring American bombers, searchlights scanning the skies, firebombs dropped from planes, the city a sea of fire, fleeing masses, and his father's deformed goldfish swimming in its tank, flashes from the bombs reflecting in the water.

"I was rushed away from my childhood, a time that should be filled with eating and playing, by the enigmatic monstrosity of war; my dreams were a vortex of fear and anxiety, anger and resignation. On the night of the air raid, I remember watching swarms of people flee from bald mountaintops. But then something occurs to me: was that moment real? Dream and reality are all mixed up in my memories, recorded permanently in this ambiguous way."

Tanaami took to drawing from a young age, and as a junior high school student he often spent time at the studio of leading postwar cartoonist Kazushi Hara with the intention of becoming a cartoonist himself. After Hara's sudden death, however, he turned to the pioneering field within manga of graphic novels, and went on to study to become a professional artist at Musashino Art University. Word of his talent spread quickly during his time there and in 1958, as a second year student, he was awarded the Special Selection at an exhibition held by the authoritative illustration and design group of the time. After graduating he took a job with an advertising agency, but quit before one year was up due to the numerous private commissions he was receiving. During the '60s he busied himself as a successful illustrator and graphic designer while also actively participating in the Neo-Dada organization, one of the defining art movements of postwar Japan. In the latter half of the '60s he immersed himself in making video art, the newest medium in the art scene at the time.

"In the 1960s, the Sogetsu Art Center in Akasaka regularly held events that traversed many diverse genres. There were happenings staged by Yoko Ono, videos by Nam June Paik and experimental films from America. It was around that time that I heard about the [Sogetsu] Animation Festival (1965). I wanted so badly to make an animation, so I convinced Yōji Kuri's Experimental Animation Studio to help me create 'Marionettes in Masks' (35 mm, 8 minutes). I continued to make animations after that, with works such as 'Good-by Marilyn' (1971), 'Good-by Elvis and USA' (1971), 'Crayon Angel' (1975) and 'Sweet Friday' (1975)."

The last supper by Keiichi Tanaami exhibited at the Colección SOLO museum in Madrid (Spain).

In 1967, Tanaami took his first trip to New York City. There he came face to face with the works of Andy Warhol, shining brightly amidst the whirlwind of prospering American consumerism, and Tanaami was struck by the new possibilities of art within the world of design.

"Warhol was in the process of shifting from commercial illustrator to artist, and I both witnessed and experienced firsthand his tactics, his method of incision into the art world. His strategies were identical to the strategies employed by advertising agencies. He used contemporary icons as motifs in his works and for his other activities put together media such as films, newspapers and rock bands. In other words, Warhol's sole existence was selling his works to the art market. I was shocked by this, and at the same time I embraced him as the perfect role model for myself. Like Warhol, I decided not to limit myself to one medium, to fine art or design only, but instead to explore many different methods."

At the height of psychedelic culture and pop art, Tanaami's kitschy, colorful illustrations and design work received high acclaim in both Japan and abroad. "NO MORE WAR", his prize-winning piece from the 1968 antiwar poster contest organized by AVANT-GARDE Magazine, in addition to his album cover art for legendary bands The Monkees and Jefferson Airplane and other such works left a major footprint on the path to introducing psychedelic and pop art to Japan. Furthermore, his series of erotic paintings featuring Hollywood actresses done in the early '70s became an important body of work that declared Tanaami as the Japanese artist with a witty eye on American culture.

In 1975, Tanaami became the first art director of the Japanese edition of Playboy, Monthly Playboy, and went to New York once again to visit Playboy's head office. The editor there took him to Andy Warhol's Factory. Tanaami's works from this period, mostly in the mediums of film and print, were provocative and experimental. His films in particular received wide critical acclaim, appearing in the International Short Film Festival Oberhausen in Germany (1975, 1976), the New York Film Festival (1976), and the Ottawa International Animation Festival in Canada (1976). The vanguard nature of his work led the police to shut down his 1976 exhibit Super Orange of Love at Nishimura Gallery for inspection on the opening day.

In 1981, at the age of 45, he suffered a pulmonary edema and for a time hovered at the edge of life and death. Throughout the '80s and '90s, Tanaami created many works centered around the theme of Life and Death based on the experience. For example, the pine tree form that appears frequently in Tanaami's works comes from a hallucination he experienced during his illness. Similarly, the cranes, elephants and naked women that appear along with spirals and miniature garden-like architectural forms are characteristic of his works from this period.

In 1999, a retrospective of Tanaami's works from the '60s was held at Gallery 360° in Tokyo. The exhibit was praised highly by Yamataka Eye (Boredoms) and KAWS, cultural leaders of the new generation born after the '60s, and as a result, Tanaami's works once again became popular amongst youth culture. Since 2005, Tanaami has been presenting new works that fall in the realm of fine art. In these works, he continues to manifest images from his personal memories and from his dream world—personified goldfish, deformed characters, rays of light, helical pine trees, fantastical architecture, young girls—through the various mediums of painting, sculpture, film and furniture.

Tanaami worked as a professor at Kyoto University of Art and Design since 1991, where he helped bring up young new artists such as Tabaimo.

Recent exhibits include Day Tripper at Art & Public in Geneva (2007), SPIRAL at Galerie Gebr. Lehmann in Berlin (2008), Kochuten at NANZUKA UNDERGROUND (2009), Still in Dream at Frieze Art Fair (2010) and No More War at Art 42 Basel (2011), works such The Catalogue of Eccentricity series 33, 52, 66 and 78 are include at Protection No Longer Assured (2023) exhibition at Colección Solo museum in Madrid and The Last Supper (2015) is part of Colección SOLO's museum permanent exhibition.

In 2022, Venus Over Manhattan in partnership with NANZUKA, Tokyo, announced the representation of Tokyo-based artist Keiichi Tanaami in their debut solo exhibition with him, titled "Manhattan Universe." The exhibition featured Tanaami's latest monumental paintings, pieces from the "Pleasure of Picasso" series, and the video work "Red Shadow."

== Illness and death ==
In late June 2024, Tanaami was diagnosed with myelodysplastic syndrome, but remained hopeful about his recovery.

Before the diagnosis, Tanaami had been preparing for a large-scale retrospective exhibition of his work, Keiichi Tanaami: Adventures in Memory held at The National Art Center, which opened on 8 August.

In late July before the opening of his exhibition, Tanaami suffered a subarachnoid hemorrhage from which he was unable to recover. He died on 9 August, at the age of 88.

== Solo exhibitions ==
- 1958 "Metallic Art for Open-air Murals", Muramatsu Gallery, Tokyo
- 1959 "Formative Art of Light by Metallic Art", Ginza Sato Gallery, Tokyo
- 1965 "Keiichi Tanaami - SERIES ORDER MADE", Tsubaki Kindai Gallery, Tokyo
- 1970 "Commercial Graphic", Gallery Melton, Canada
- 1971 "Keiichi Tanaami - CELLULOID BORN IN AMERICA", Gallery Décor, Tokyo
- 1971 "Cinema Demonstration", Sogetsu Hall, Tokyo
- 1972 "Films by Keiichi Tanaami", Tenjo-Sajiki-kan, Tokyo
- 1972 "Clockwork Marilyn", Gallery Décor, Tokyo
- 1974 "SUPER ORANGE OF LOVE SERIES", Nishimura Gallery, Tokyo
- 1976 "YOUSHIKEI (Infantile Landscape)", Nishimura Gallery, Tokyo
- 1977 "BOENKYO (The Mirror of Forgetting Childhood)" Serigraphy, Ao Gallery, Tokyo
- 1979 "ANOTHER PARADISE OF ARTIFICE SERIES", Ao Gallery, Tokyo
- 1980 "GIKEIZUKAN (The Illustrated Book of Artificial View) SERIES", Gallery Vivant, Tokyo
- 1984 "BURNING IN THE EVENING SERIES", Gallery Vivant, Tokyo
- 1985 "HYAKKA RYORAN (Bright With All Sorts of Flowers) – Keiichi Tanaami 60's Poster Exhibition", Gallery 360°, Tokyo
- 1986 "THE HOLLYWOOD STARDUST", Gallery 360°, Yurakucho Seibu Marion, Tokyo
- 1986 "The World of Keiichi Tanaami - PASSAGE IN THE AIR", Shibuya Seibu Seed Hall, Tokyo
- 1987 "Keiichi Tanaami", Annecy Chateau Museum, France
- 1987 "THE HOUSE IN ACSENTION", Plus Minus Gallery, Tokyo
- 1989 "New Works of Keiichi Tanaami - LAW OF THE FOREST", Shibuya Seibu Seed Hall, Tokyo
- 1990 "LAW OF THE FOREST", Seibu Hall, Shiga
- 1991 "SPIRAL FOREST-2", Nogizaka Art Hall, Tokyo
- 1991 "Keiichi Tanaami Print Exhibition - CELEBLATION OF THE FOREST", Muramatsu Gallery, Tokyo
- 1992 "The World of Keiichi Tanaami", Ikeda 20th Century Museum, Shizuoka
- 1994 "Keiichi Tanaami-Works of Print 1967-1994", Kawasaki City Museum, Kanagawa
- 1994 "Keiichi Tanaami's Film-Image of Memory", AV Hall, Kawasaki City Museum, Kanagawa
- 1995 "Keiichi Tanaami Print Exhibition-Resembling", Gallery Vivant, Tokyo
- 1995 "Keiichi Tanaami Print Exhibition-Travel for Memories", Bokushin Gallery, Tokyo
- 1996 "Keiichi Tannami-100 Prints", Chukyo University C-Square, Nagoya
- 1998 "Variation by Dry-Point", Gallery Vivant, Tokyo
- 2000 "Keiichi Tanaami Graphic Works in the 60's", Gallery 360°, Tokyo
- 2001 "Keiichi Tanaami BLOW UP Launch Exhibition", Gallery 360°, Tokyo
- 2001 "Goldfish Exhibition by Keiichi Tanaami", Tokyo International Forum・Exhibition space, Tokyo
- 2002 "Tactile Sensibility of the Age-Keiichi Tanaami Graphic Works 1967-2002", D's Gallery, Kyoto University of Art and Design, Kyoto
- 2002 "Keiichi Tanaami 3000 Drawings", Gallery 360°, Tokyo
- 2002 "Keiichi Tanaami-Goldfish Lurking in a Glorious View", graf media gm, Osaka
- 2002 "Keiichi Tanaami-Legends of Volupte 1971-2002", Uplink Factory, Tokyo
- 2003 "Collage of FLOWERS by Keiichi Tanaami", Art Space Eumeria, Tokyo
- 2003 "Keiichi Tanaami-GET BACK", Gallery 360°, Tokyo
- 2004 "DISCO UNIVERSITY with Naohiro Ukawa", KPO Kirin Plaza Osaka, Japan
- 2004 "TANAAMI'S BEAUTY PARADE", Naruyama Gallery, Tokyo
- 2004 "Keiichi Tanaami – Ascension Furniture", graf media gm, Osaka
- 2004 "Keiichi Tanaami - Ascension Furniture + Fantastic City", EX'REALM, Tokyo
- 2004 "Keiichi Tanaami – Big Playground City", IDEE, Kyoto
- 2005 Solo Exhibition, Transplant Gallery, New York
- 2005 "Films of Keiichi Tanaami and Graphic 100", the Norwegian International Film Festival, Norway
- 2006 "TANAAMISM", Ginza Graphic Gallery, Tokyo
- 2006 "Layers of Keiichi Tanaami", Gallery AUBE, Kyoto University of Art and Design, Kyoto
- 2006 "Keiichi Tanaami – KAMON", Paul Smith 9 Albemarls Street Shop, London
- 2007 "DAYDREAM", NANZUKA UNDERGROUND, Tokyo
- 2008 "Spiral", Galerie Gebr. Lehmann, Berlin
- 2008 "COLORFUL", NANZUKA UNDERGROUND, Tokyo
- 2008 "DAYTRIPPER", Art & Public –Cabinet PH, Geneva
- 2009 "Kochuten", NANZUKA UNDERGROUND
- 2009 "SPIRAL 2", Galerie Gebr. Lehmann, Dresden /Berlin
- 2009 "KANNOOON", NANZUKA UNDERGROUND
- 2010 "Wander in The Chaos World - Keiichi Tanaami's Fantastic World - ", The OCT Art & Design Gallery, Shennan, China
- 2010 "Frieze Art Fair", NANZUKA UNDERGROUND
- 2011 "Art BASEL", NANZUKA UNDERGROUND
- 2017 "Land of Mirrors", Gary Tatintsian Gallery, Moscow Keiichi Tanaami: Land Of Mirrors - Exhibition View | Gary Tatintsian Gallery, Inc.
- 2024 "Manhattan Universe", Venus Over Manhattan, New York
- 2024 "Adventures in Memory", The National Art Center, Tokyo

== Bibliography ==
=== Books of Paintings ===
- 1963 "Tamago-gata (Egg Shape)", Modern Art Center
- 1966 "Portrait of Keiichi Tanaami", Private Press
- 1969 "Kyozo Mirai Zukan (Illustrated Book of Imaginary Tomorrow)", Coauthor: Eizaburo Hara, Bronze-sha
- 1974 "The World of Keiichi Tanaami", Rippu Shobo
- 1984 "Keiichi Tanaami 1979-1984", Private Press
- 1986 "Passage in the Air; Paradise of Keiichi Tanaami", Shuei-sha
- 1989 "Law of the Forest", Fuso-sha
- 1990 "The Work of Keiichi Tanaami", Sano Gallery
- 1991 "Blessing of the Forest", Sano Gallery
- 1992 "100 Images", Tom's Box
- 1994 "Keiichi Tanaami-Works of Print; 1967-1994", Kawasaki City Museum

"Hollywood Stardust", Sanshindo Publishing
"Travel for Memories", Sanshindo Publishing

- 2001 "BLOW UP", Seigen-sha Art Publishing
- 2002 "AMIGOS", Gallery 360°

"KINGYO", Amus Arts Press

- 2004 "BLOW UP 2", Seigen-sha Art Publishing

"Dream and Memory", Studio Warp
"Portrait of Keiichi Tanaami" (1966) Reprinted Edition, Keiichi Tanaami Design Studio
"Keiichi Tanaami – Hyakka Kyoran", PRINTS 21

- 2005 "spiral", Seigen-sha Art Publishing
- 2006 "KAMON", KING OF MOUNTAIN

"Keiichi Tanaami ggg Books 76", Ginza Graphic Gallery-Trans Art
"Layers of Keiichi Tanaami", Kyoto University of Art and Design

- 2007 "DAYDREAM", Graphic-sha
- 2008 "colorful", Nanzuka underground
- 2009 "Kochuten", Nanzuka underground
- 2014 "Birth and Death Bridge", United Dead Artists

=== Books of Prints ===
- 1971 "Celluloid Borin In America", Gallery Décor, Tokyo
- 1974 "Pan Cake for Breakfast", Rippu Shobo
- 1986 "Hollywood Stardust", Image Forum
- 1990 "Spiral Forest", Private Press
- 1991 "Celebration of the Forest", Sano Gallery
- 1998 "Variation", Galerie Vivant

=== Essay on Films ===
- 1978 "Cine Market of Keiichi Tanaami; Artificial Paradise", Hachiyo-sha

=== Joint Authorship ===
- 1996 "100 M Sightseeing – Ideas for Information Design" Coauthor: Masako Inada, Chikuma shobo

=== Exhibition Catalogue ===
- 1975 "Far From the Film – Keiichi Tanaami", Image Forum
- 1991 "Spiral Forest 2", Nogizaka Art Hall
- 1992 "The World of Keiichi Tanaami", Ikeda 20th Century Museum
- 1994 "Keiichi Tanaami – Works of Drawing and Print", Irodori Museum
- 2002 "Keiichi Tanaami – Animation Catalogue", Research Center for Information Design, Kyoto University of Art and Design
- 2004 "Weekly TANAAMI", Keibun-sha Ichijoji-ten

== Editorial Design/Art Direction ==
- 1998－2000 "Series: Information Design", Edit: Kyoto University of Art and Design, Kadokawa Shoten Publishing

== DVD ==
- 2002 "TANAAMISM – Magician of Film 1975-2002, Broadway
- 2002 "TANAAMISM 2 – Visual Epicureanism 1971-2003, Broadway
- 2003 "TANAAMISM"〔DVDBOX〕, Broadway
- 2004 "SCRAP DIARY+ANIMACTIONS!!, CREAGE

== Film works ==
- 1971 "JAM POT" 16mm color 24mins

"GREEN・RED" 16mm color 12mins
"SHE" 16mm color 8mins
"PUSSY"(2 sides) 16mm color 12mins
"RAINBOW・SCENE"(3 sides) 16mm color 11mins

- 1973 "U.F.O" 16mm color 4mins
- 1974 "SWEET TOUCH OF LOVE" 16mm color 3mins

"GET BACK ON THE HILL" 16mm color 12mins

- 1975 "4・EYES" 16mm color 9mins

"WHY" 16mm color 10mins30sec
"SHOOT THE MOON" 16mm color 8mins
"SPECTACLE" 16mm color 16mins50sec
"PHOTOGRAPHS AND MEMORIES" 16mm color 23mins
"LOOK AT THE WOOD" 16mm color 12mins
"Artificial Paradise" 16mm color 14mins
"Human Events" 16mm color 5mins

- 1976 "Casa Blanca" 16mm color 9mins42sec
- 1977 "Jekyll and Hyde" 16mm color 13mins
- 1978 "Frankenstein" 16mm color 11mins

"YOUSHI KEI (Prologue)" 16mm color 11mins12sec
"YOUSHI KEI (Preview)" 16mm color 3mins

- 1979 "YOUSHI KEI (Another Rainbow City)" 16mm color 17mins17sec
- 1980 "Darkness Luring a Faint" 16mm color 27mins
- 1981 "Ryogu-Saishoku" 16mm color 15mins
- 1984 "Dream Shape Records" 16mm color 30mins
- 2002 "WHY Re-mix 2002" DV color 3mins20sec

== Animation works ==
- 1965 "Marionettes in Masks" 35mm color 8mins
- 1966 "Women"(Co-produced with Shigetaka Sawada) 35mm color 7mins
- 1971 "GOOD-BY MARILYN" 16mm color 4mina52sec

"GOOD-BY ELVIS and USA" 16mm color 7mins
"FLICKER LOVE NO.1" 16mm color 4mins
"COMMERCIAL WAR" 16mm color 4mins30sec

- 1973 "Oh Yoko!" 16mm color 4mins
- 1975 "Gentle Friday" 16mm color 3mins

"CRAYON ANGEL" 16mm color 3mins

- 2000 "Dark Memories/Shadows of Dream" 16mm color 4mins
- 2001 "Breath of Window (Correspondence by Animation)" 16mm color 4mins
- 2002 "Scrap Diary" 16mm B&W 4mins

"Gaze in the Summer – 1942" 16mm color 4mins
"Memories (Scene of the Childhood)" 16mm color 3mins15sec
"Walking Man" 16mm color 6mins
"GOLDFISH FETISH" DV color 6mins

- 2003 "PUZZLE OF AUTUMN" DV color 8mins

"FETISH DOLL" 16mm color 6mins
"Portrait of Keiichi Tanaami" DV color 6mins

- 2004 "LANDSCAPE" 16mm color 4mins25sec

"Ten Nights' Dreams" 16mm color 6mins

- 2005 "TRIP" 16mm color 4mins30sec

"Madonna's Temptation" 16mm color 4mins
"BLOW UP 2" DV color 8mins
"4・EYES Re-Mix 2005" DV color 7mins
"MADONNA" DV color 5mins
"The Harmonic Gleam Vibration" DV color 10mins

- 2006 "NOISE" 16mm color 8mins50sec
- 2007 "INCH-HIGH SAMURAI" 16mm color 4mins35sec
- 2008 "DE CHIRICO" 16mm color 4mins30sec
- 2009 "SHUNGA" 16mm color 4mins30sec
