= Super Furry Animals =

Welsh rock band

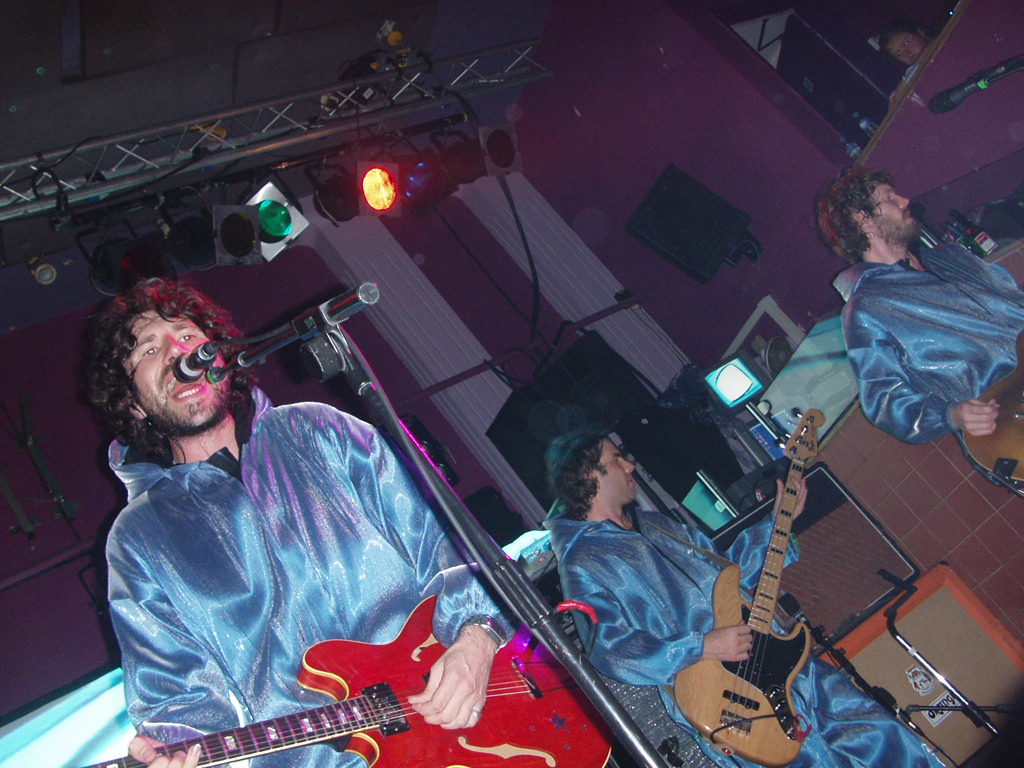
- Left to right: Gruff Rhys, Guto Pryce and Huw Bunford at Bridgwater Palace in September 2005

Background information
- Origin: Cardiff, Wales
- Genres: Alternative rock; progressive pop; indie rock; power pop; neo-psychedelia; electronica; experimental rock
- Years active: 1993–2010; 2015–2016; 2026–present
- Labels: Epic; Creation; XL; Beggars Banquet; Rough Trade; Placid Casual; Flydaddy; Strangetown
- Members: Gruff Rhys; Huw Bunford; Guto Pryce; Cian Ciaran; Dafydd Ieuan
- Past members: Rhys Ifans
- Website: www.superfurry.com

Super Furry Animals are a Welsh rock band formed in Cardiff in 1993. For the duration of their professional career, the band consisted of Gruff Rhys (lead vocals, guitar), Huw Bunford (lead guitar, vocals), Guto Pryce (bass guitar), Cian Ciaran (keyboards, synthesisers, various electronics, occasional guitar, vocals), and Dafydd Ieuan (drums, vocals). An earlier incarnation of the band featured actor Rhys Ifans on lead vocals. The band are considered to be part of the renaissance of Cool Cymru Welsh culture which emerged in the 1990s; other Welsh bands of the time include the Manic Street Preachers, Stereophonics, Catatonia and Gorky's Zygotic Mynci.

Super Furry Animals have recorded nine UK Albums Chart Top 25 studio albums (one BPI certified Gold and four certified Silver), plus numerous singles, EPs, compilations and collaborations. The band were known as central to the Cool Cymru era during which they were dominant, and are the act with the most top 40 hits without reaching the UK Singles Chart Top 10. Over the course of nine albums, Super Furry Animals has been described as "one of the most imaginative bands of our time" by Billboard, while according to a 2005 article in NME, "There's a case to be argued that [Super Furry Animals] were the most important band of the past 15 years".

== History ==
=== 1990–1993: Formation ===
Super Furry Animals formed in Cardiff in 1993 after the members had been part of various other bands in Wales: Gruff Rhys and Dafydd Ieuan had played together in Ffa Coffi Pawb, whilst Huw Bunford and Guto Pryce were previously members of U Thant. Actor Rhys Ifans joined them as lead vocalist, and started to perform initially in a techno style before becoming more rock-orientated. Ifans would shortly leave however once his acting career took off, with Gruff Rhys stepping in on lead vocals.

The name of the band came from T-shirts being printed by Rhys' sister. She was making Super Furry Animals T-shirts for the fashion and music collective Acid Casuals (variants of whose name have appeared throughout Super Furry Animals' career – for example, in their song "The Placid Casual", their record label Placid Casual). The band has also made reference to Elvis Costello, and Wynton Marsalis as major influences in their work.

=== 1994–1995: Early recordings ===
The earliest Super Furry Animals track commercially available is "Dim Brys: Dim Chwys", recorded in 1994 for Radio Cymru: an ambient piece, the track shows the band's techno roots. However, by the time it was released (on the "Triskedekaphilia" compilation album in August 1995), the band had already put out their debut EP on the Ankst label. The Llanfairpwllgwyngyllgogerychwyndrobwllantysiliogogogochynygofod (In Space) EP appeared in June 1995 and has been listed in the Guinness Book of Records as having the longest-ever title for an EP.

The Moog Droog EP followed in October 1995, named after the synthesiser manufacturer Robert Moog and the Nadsat term for "friend" in A Clockwork Orange. The EP's title is also a pun on the Welsh mwg drwg slang for cannabis, literally "bad (or naughty) smoke". The lyrics on all the tracks on both EPs were in Welsh, except for "God! Show Me Magic" from "Moog Droog". Around this time, Cian Ciaran, Ieuan's younger brother, joined the band full-time as keyboard player after previously being part of electronic outfit Wwzz and the Acid Casuals collective.

After gigging in London in late 1995, they were noticed by Creation Records boss Alan McGee at the Camden Monarch club, who signed them to his label. Creation was also home to Primal Scream, My Bloody Valentine and Teenage Fanclub, and had recently found massive commercial success with Oasis. The band have said that having watched their gig, McGee asked them if they could sing in English rather than Welsh in future shows. In fact, by this stage they were singing in English, but McGee did not realise because their Welsh accents were so strong. The Super Furry Animals received some criticism in the Welsh media for singing in English, something which the band felt "completely pissed" about. According to drummer Dafydd Ieuan: "It all started when we played this festival in West Wales, and for some reason the Welsh media started foaming at the mouth because we were singing songs in Welsh and English. But they get The Dubliners playing and they do not sing in Irish. It's ridiculous." The band have explained that the decision to sing in English was taken in order to broaden their fanbase.

=== 1996–1998: Fuzzy Logic to Out Spaced ===
In February 1996, the band's debut on Creation, "Hometown Unicorn", became New Musical Express's Single of the Week, chosen by guest reviewers Pulp, and the first Super Furry Animals single to chart in the UK Top 50, peaking at No. 47. The follow-up, a re-recording of "God! Show Me Magic", charted at No. 33 upon release in April 1996 and also became NME single of the week. Rawer than the "Moog Droog" version, it clocks in at 1 min 50 secs. In May, their debut album Fuzzy Logic was released, to wide critical acclaim. Sales were slow, with the album peaking at No. 23 in the charts, but it garnered a little more interest when next single "Something 4 the Weekend" (a reworked, more mellow version of the album track) was given considerable radio airplay and charted at No. 18 in July 1996.

The final single from the album, "If You Don't Want Me to Destroy You", was to have been backed by a track called "The Man Don't Give a Fuck". However, there were problems in clearing a sample from "Showbiz Kids" by Steely Dan which formed the basis of the chorus, and it was switched for a different track. The single charted at No. 18. However, Super Furry Animals regarded "The Man Don't Give a Fuck" as one of their best songs and continued their efforts to clear the sample. When they managed this, there was no upcoming release to attach it to – so it came out as a limited edition single in its own right, in December 1996. This ultimately cemented its legendary status and did much to establish Super Furry Animals as cult heroes, as the song contained the word "fuck" over 50 times and therefore received practically no airplay. However, it hit No. 22 in the charts and became Super Furry Animals' standard closing number when they played live.

In early 1997, Super Furry Animals embarked on the NME Brats Tour and completed work on a speedy follow-up to Fuzzy Logic. Two singles preceded the new album, "Hermann ♥'s Pauline" in May and "The International Language of Screaming" in July, hitting No. 26 and No. 24 respectively: these releases were the first to feature cover art from Pete Fowler, who went on to design the sleeves of all their releases up until 2007's Hey Venus. The album, Radiator, hit shelves in August. The reviews were, if anything, better than those for Fuzzy Logic, and it sold more quickly than its predecessor, reaching a peak of No. 8: however, Creation did not serve the album particularly well by releasing it just four days after the long-awaited new effort from Oasis, Be Here Now. Two further singles, "Play It Cool" (released September 1997) and "Demons" (November 1997) both hit No. 27 in the charts, suggesting that Super Furry Animals had hit a commercial ceiling through which they were struggling to break. However, they had established themselves as favourites in the music press, a cut above the majority of their Britpop peers.

After a chance to think about their music and their direction, Super Furry Animals decided to record a new EP in early 1998 at Gorwel Owen's house and released it in May. This was the Ice Hockey Hair EP, widely held as one of their finest moments ("ice hockey hair" is a slang term for a mullet.) Featuring four tracks, the EP sampled from Black Uhuru. The title track, a melodic and very moving epic, gained airplay while "Smokin'". In a Melody Maker interview, Super Furry Animals said the "Smokin'" referred to smoking haddock, or to truck drivers' tyres when they're 'burnin' the roads'. It became their most successful single up to this point, hitting No. 12 in the charts and leading to a memorable appearance on "Top of the Pops".

In November 1998, the album Out Spaced was released. This was a collection of songs from the 1995 Ankst releases (including "Dim Brys: Dim Chwys"), the band's favourite B-sides, plus "The Man Don't Give a Fuck" and "Smokin'". A limited edition appeared in a comedy rubber sleeve, shaped like a nipple.

=== 1999–2000: Guerrilla and Mwng ===
In 1999, NME readers named them 'best new band' in January (this despite the fact it was now three years since they released their debut album). In May, the single "Northern Lites" was released and made No. 11 in the charts. A dense production, with steel drums clattering out a calypso rhythm whilst Rhys sang an irreverent lyric about the El Niño-Southern Oscillation weather phenomenon, it was an apt taster for the new album, Guerrilla. Recorded at the Real World Studios, the album retained SFA's pop melodies but took a less guitar-centric approach to their execution and was their most experimental work to date. Layers of samples over brass, percussion and Gruff's melodic singing produced an album which took the freewheeling approach of 1960s groups such as The Beatles, The Beach Boys and The Velvet Underground and updated it to the late 1990s. The album swung from glam and garage rock numbers ("Night Vision", "The Teacher") to novelty techno ("Wherever I Lay My Phone (That's My Home)"), ambient indietronica ("Some Things Come From Nothing") and upbeat drum and bass ("The Door To This House Remains Open"). For the cover art, Pete Fowler created the band's first three-dimensional models, rather than the paintings he had supplied for the Radiator album and singles.

After playing several of the summer festivals, SFA released "Fire in My Heart", the most soulful track from Guerrilla, in August and saw it chart at No. 25. They then embarked on a US and UK tour. SFA finished their UK tour at the Cardiff International Arena in Cardiff, where they showcased the first ever concert in surround sound and broadcast it on the World Wide Web.

January 2000 involved a series of changes for SFA. The last single from Guerrilla, "Do or Die", was released and made No. 20. It was also the last single SFA released on Creation Records, as founder Alan McGee set off to pursue other interests. It had always been SFA's plan to release their next album on their own label, Placid Casual, as it would be a deliberate sidestep from their recent work: a largely acoustic album of Welsh language songs entitled Mwng. Meaning "mane", its lilting melodies established that SFA's songwriting did not have to fall back on head-spinning production tricks. A limited edition (of 3000) 7 inch record, "Ysbeidiau Heulog" (meaning "Sunny Intervals") preceded Mwng in May 2000. It came backed with "Charge", a hard-rock jam recorded as a Peel Session for the BBC. The album, released the same month, sold remarkably well for a non-English LP – it made No. 11 in the charts – and received a rare distinction for a pop record, being commended in Parliament for its efforts in keeping the Welsh language alive.

2000 also saw the Furries contribute two tracks, Free Now and Peter Blake 2000, for the Liverpool Sound Collage project, which was nominated for a Grammy. They undertook this remixing of unreleased Beatles recordings at the invitation of Paul McCartney, whom they had met at the NME Awards, where they had won Best Live Act.

=== 2001–2003: Rings Around the World and Phantom Power ===
With the demise of Creation, SFA needed to find a new label for their next album. Sony had long held a substantial stake in Creation and offered deals to many ex-Creation artists, including SFA, who signed with one of Sony's subsidiaries, Epic. The band pushed for a deal which allowed them to take a new album elsewhere if the label was not interested in releasing it – thereby allowing them to find a home for any esoteric project they might want to undertake in the future.

The greater resources afforded them by Epic were apparent in their first album for the label, Rings Around the World, an album that recaptured the cohesive, experimental feel of Guerrilla but more song-driven and sonically expansive. It is cited by many critics and fans alike as their most polished and accessible work. Again the first single was a good indication of what was to come: "Juxtapozed with U", released in July 2001, was a lush soul record which made No. 14 in the charts. The album followed in the same month and major label marketing muscle made it their biggest-seller to date, reaching No. 3 in the album charts. One of the tracks from the album, "Receptacle For the Respectable" featured Paul McCartney on "carrot and celery rhythm track" (a homage to his performance on the Beach Boys' "Vegetables"). SFA unleashed their experimental side on tracks such as "Sidewalk Serfer Girl" (which switches between light techno-pop and hardcore punk), "[A] Touch Sensitive" (gloomy trip-hop) and "No Sympathy" (which descends into chaotic drum'n'bass), but also apparent was an angrier edge to the lyrics: "Run! Christian, Run!" seemed to be an attack on the complacency of organised religion.

Rings Around the World is also notable for being the world's first simultaneous release of an audio and DVD album. It was nominated for the Mercury Music Prize in 2001. The ceremony took place on the day after the terror attacks on the World Trade Center and the Pentagon, and SFA's performance of the album track "It's Not the End of the World?" took on a somewhat bitter edge. It was released as a single in January 2002 (chart No. 30), following "(Drawing) Rings Around the World" (chart No. 28): neither had that much impact but still received some airplay, notably on BBC Radio 2.

The next album, Phantom Power, relied less on sound experimentation and proved to be a more stripped-down, back-to-basics recording in contrast to the orchestral Rings Around the World. It was also released as both a CD and DVD album in July 2003, preceded by a single, "Golden Retriever", in June (chart No. 13). Although the reviews for the album were generally good and it sold well initially, charting at No. 4, the album broke little new ground by SFA's standards and the band had fallen out of fashion, receiving little coverage in the music press. Another single, "Hello Sunshine", hit No. 31 in October 2003 and was eventually featured on the soundtrack of The O.C..

=== 2004–2005: Phantom Phorce to Love Kraft ===
Perhaps recognising that their approach to Phantom Power had been a little too straightforward, the group followed it up in 2004 with a remix version, Phantom Phorce, with tracks reworked by the likes of Killa Kela, Four Tet and Brave Captain. They accompanied this with a download single, "Slow Life", which also included the track "Motherfokker", a collaboration with Goldie Lookin Chain, both tracks are now available as a free download via the Placid Casual website. In October 2004 the band released a best of album, Songbook: The Singles, Vol. 1, accompanied by a single – a live version of "The Man Don't Give a Fuck" (chart No. 16).

In early 2005, Gruff Rhys released a solo album Yr Atal Genhedlaeth, ("The Stuttering Generation", and also a play on words as "Atal Genhedlu" means contraception), sung all in Welsh. Gruff played most of the instruments himself, mainly using guitars, drums and his own multi-tracked voice. The band also selected tracks for a volume in the Under the Influence series of compilations, in which artists present the songs that they feel have most contributed to their sound.

In 2005 Super Furry Animals were asked to put together the sixth release from the 'Under The Influence' series - Under the Influence: Super Furry Animals. Each member chose 3 track each - Pryce's selections were Dawn Penn "You Don't Love Me (No, No, No)", Dennis Wilson and Rumbo "Lady" and MC5 "Kick Out the Jams".

Also in 2005 it was reported that the band turned down a US$1.8m advertising deal with Coca-Cola after visiting a Coca-Cola plantation in Colombia with charity War on Want, where they heard of management-directed killings of trade-union members. The company were asking for use of "Hello Sunshine" as part of their campaign. In a statement to British magazine Q, Coca-Cola denied the allegations, stating they had been "an exemplary member of the business community" in Colombia.

In August 2005, Super Furry Animals released their seventh studio effort, Love Kraft, recorded in Spain. This represented a departure from their previous working methods: although all five members had always contributed to the development of the songs, Rhys had been the main songwriter. On Love Kraft this was no longer the case, as Rhys, Bunford, Ieuan and Ciaran all contributed songs and lead vocals. There was only one single from the album, "Lazer Beam", released on 15 August (chart No. 28). The laid-back ambience recalls early-1970s Beach Boys albums such as Surf's Up (which SFA have referred to as one of their favourite albums), whilst the heavy use of strings suggested the likes of Scott Walker and Curtis Mayfield. The album's cool commercial reception (it charted at just No. 19) suggested that they had returned to their familiar status of critically acclaimed cult favourites. Love Kraft was also the last album released under Epic Records, as their contract expired in early 2006.

=== 2006–2008: Rough Trade and Hey Venus! ===
Ciaran's side project Acid Casuals released their debut album Omni in January 2006 on the Placid Casual label. Drummer Ieuan formed a band known as The Peth which has been described by Rhys in various magazine articles as "Satanic Abba": the band also reunites Rhys Ifans with the SFA family, as he takes lead vocal duties.

The band signed to Rough Trade Records during 2006 and are reportedly working on three projects for the label. Gruff Rhys has also signed for Rough Trade Records as a solo artist in his own right and released a single on 7" vinyl and download entitled "Candylion" in late 2006 which preceded an album of the same name that was released during the second week of 2007. Unlike his debut Yr Atal Genhedlaeth, Candylion is primarily sung in English but has two Welsh tracks and one in "bad Spanish": it is primarily an acoustic album, and came about because Rhys has written several acoustic pop songs that did not fit with the direction of the new SFA record.

Recording sessions took place in a chateau in the south of France in 2007 for the band's first release for Rough Trade, Hey Venus!, which was released on 27 August that year. Gruff himself described the record as "speaker blowing". The album's first single, "Show Your Hand", failed to enter the top 40, their first to do so since 1996's "Hometown Unicorn", despite modest airplay. The album itself fared much better, peaking at No. 11 and was a slight improvement from the sales of Love Kraft. The album became their first to enter the iTunes Music Store top 10 album charts, peaking at No. 9. Over the 2007 Christmas period SFA released a single, "The Gift That Keeps Giving", free from their website.

=== 2009–2014: Dark Days/Light Years and hiatus ===
On 16 March 2009, Super Furry Animals released their ninth and final studio album, Dark Days/Light Years, digitally via their website. The album's progress was recorded in a series of short films that were shown on the band's website in the build-up to the release. Later in March, they performed the record in its entirety through an exclusive stream on their website. A physical release on Rough Trade Records followed on 21 April, resulting in a number 23 UK Chart placement. Dark Days/Light Years notably featured a guest appearance from Nick McCarthy of Franz Ferdinand on "Inaugural Trams." Dark Days/Light Years received strong critical feedback, with The Guardian writing that "it has more spark and invention than most teen bands manage on their debuts."

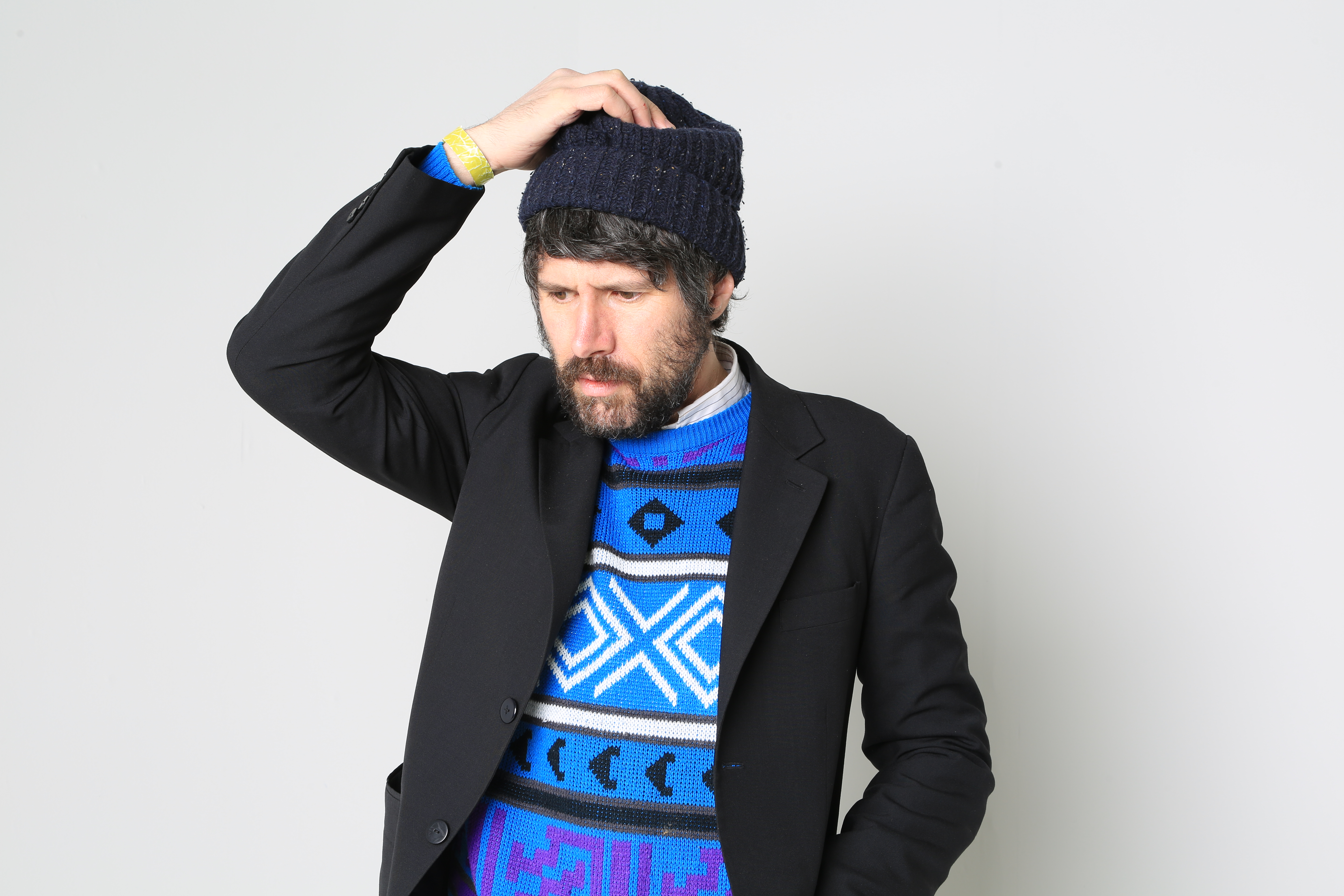
Frontman Gruff Rhys in 2015.

In 2010, Super Furry Animals went on what became a five-year hiatus, as bassist Guto Pryce revealed in an interview with Wales Online. Pryce noted that the band expected to reconvene as soon as the members finished with the various projects they were working on.

Super Furry Animals reconvened for one performance on 29 February 2012 at Cardiff City Stadium before a Wales v Costa Rica Gary Speed Memorial Match, in tribute to the late Welsh footballer and team manager.

In 2014, craft brewer The Celt Experience created a tribute "Fuzzy Beer" in collaboration with the band.

=== 2015–2016: Reunion ===
In May 2015, the band played several gigs from early May to September to accompany a major reissue of their 15-year-old album Mwng, which had been out of print. The same month a biography, Rise of the Super Furry Animals, was published by HarperCollins. In January 2016, the band announced their first North American tour in six years. In May 2016, the band released "Bing Bong", their first single in seven years. The song was released to celebrate the Wales national football team's qualification for UEFA Euro 2016. They headlined the Caught by the River Festival in August 2016, and announced the re-release of Fuzzy Logic. A compilation album, Zoom! The Best of 1995–2016, was released on 4 November 2016. The final tour of their reunion, in which they played both Fuzzy Logic and Radiator in full across the UK and Ireland, took place in December 2016.

=== 2017–present: Second hiatus and Das Koolies ===
In September 2018, the official Super Furry Animals Twitter feed posted an announcement of a multi-disc set of recordings made at the BBC to be released on 23 November 2018.

In 2019 Bunford, Ciaran, Pryce, and Ieuan reformed without Rhys under the name Das Koolies, an alter ego SFA used around 2000 for an experimental electronic album that was never officially released. Das Koolies released their debut single "It's All About The Dolphins" on 29 January 2020. According to Ciaran, Das Koolies is now their main focus; they are no longer focusing on anything from Super Furry Animals.

On 4 March 2022, the band made the first song they ever recorded, "Of No Fixed Identity", recorded in 1993 and featuring Rhys Ifans on lead vocals, available for one week only on Bandcamp, with all the proceeds going towards Save the Severn, an ongoing environmental campaign to protect the Severn Estuary.

On 29 September 2025, the band announced that they would tour again in May 2026. The "Supacadabra" tour was the first time the band had played together live for 10 years. The tour included dates in Cardiff and Llandudo and headlining at the Llangollen International Eisteddfod. They headlined on the main stage of the 2026 National Eisteddfod of Wales on Saturday 1 August. It was their first ever entirely Welsh-language gig, playing all the songs from their Mwng album. It was also the first time they'd performed at the National Eisteddfod for 30 years.They also headlined the Beautiful Days festival on Friday 21st August 2026.

In February 2026, the band announced Precreation Percolation, which compiled the band's first two EPs for Ankst alongside a bonus disc of largely unheard early demos featuring Ifans, for release on 1 May.

== Discography ==
- Fuzzy Logic (1996)
- Radiator (1997)
- Guerrilla (1999)
- Mwng (2000)
- Rings Around the World (2001)
- Phantom Power (2003)
- Love Kraft (2005)
- Hey Venus! (2007)
- Dark Days/Light Years (2009)
