= Guto Pryce =

Welsh bassist (born 1972)

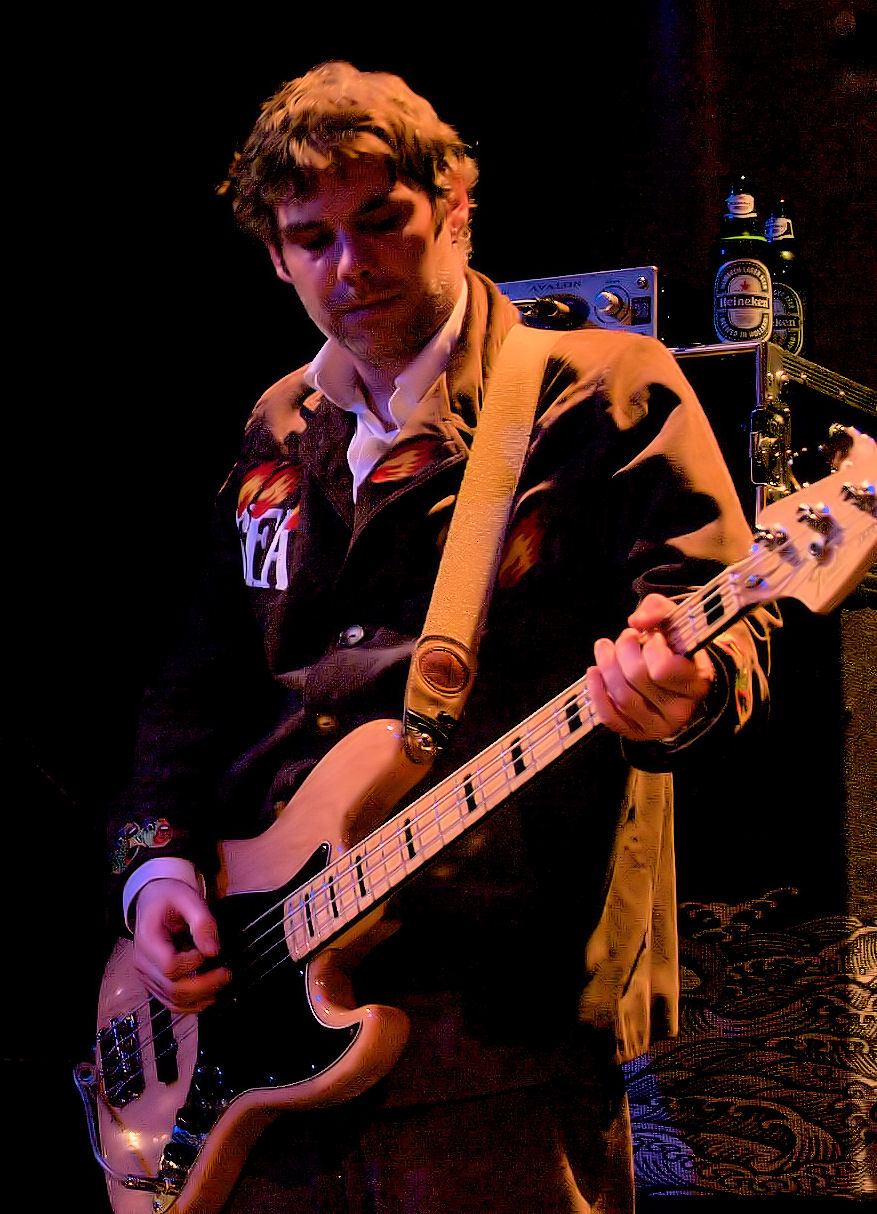
- Pryce with the Super Furry Animals in 2008

Background information
- Born: Guto Dafydd Pryce; 4 September 1972 (age 53); Cardiff, Wales
- Genres: Alternative rock, indie rock
- Occupation: Musician
- Instrument: Bass guitar

Guto Dafydd Pryce (Welsh pronunciation: [ˈɡɪtɔ]; born 4 September 1972) is a Welsh musician best known as bass guitar player and songwriter in the band Super Furry Animals. With them he has recorded nine UK Albums Chart Top 25 studio albums, plus numerous singles, EPs, compilations and collaborations. Pryce also records and performs with several other musical acts including his band Gulp. He is part of the era of Welsh music prominence known as Cool Cymru.

== Biography ==
Pryce was born in Cardiff. He was in the Welsh-language band U Thant, with his brother Iwan Pryce, Huw Bunford (also later of Super Furry Animals), Owen Powell (later of Catatonia) and others in a changing line-up, from 1989 to 1993. He recorded with Catatonia on their first two EPs before Super Furry Animals formed in 1993.

Working with dub and reggae label Trojan Records, Pryce put together a compilation Furry Selection: Luxury Cuts Of Trojan Chosen by a Super Furry Animal in 2007.

In 2008 Pryce recorded The Golden Mile with The Peth, a group which features Welsh actor Rhys Ifans on vocals, Super Furry Animals bandmate Dafydd Ieuan, Meilyr Gwynedd, Osian Gwynedd, Mick Hilton, Dic Ben and Kris Jenkins.

In 2010 Pryce played bass for Spectrum on their US and European tours.

Under the band name The Stand, Pryce joined Welsh actor Jonny Owen, Owen Powell (formerly of Catatonia) and Ryan Richards of Funeral for a Friend to record a fundraising single "I'll Be There" in 2010. Stuart Cable of Stereophonics was involved in the project prior to his death. Proceeds from sales went to a fund to erect a statue of the footballer Fred Keenor on the Cardiff City F.C. grounds. The song was adapted from the original written during the coal miner's General Strike of 1926 and often sung by Cardiff City fans. Pryce had previously shown his support for the team when the Super Furry Animals signed on as sponsors in 1999, with the band's name displayed on team jerseys.

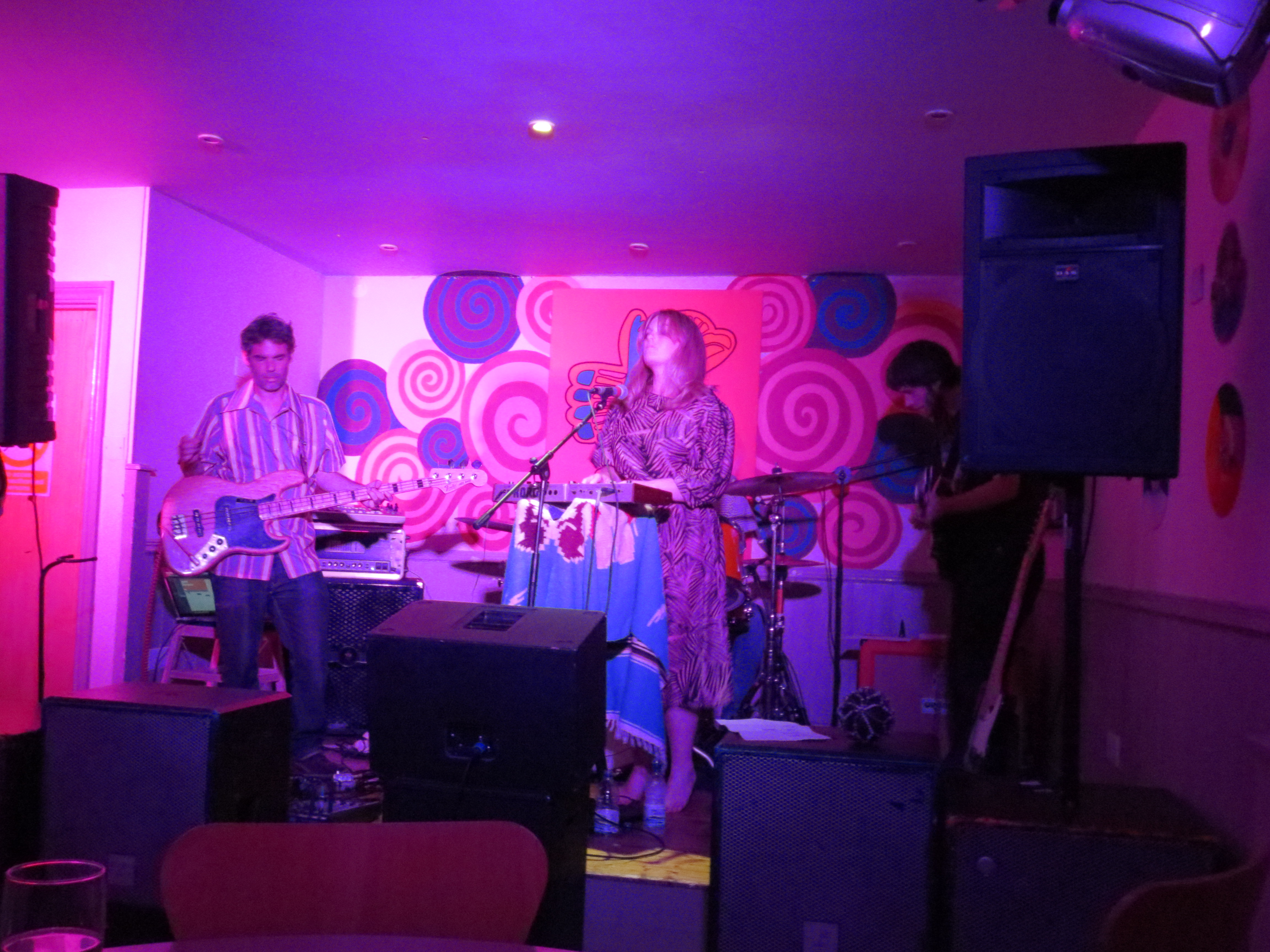
Gulp in performance in 2013

In 2012, Pryce began performing with his partner, Scottish singer and keyboardist Lindsey Leven, under the name Gulp. The band includes Gid Goundrey on guitar, Gwion Llewelyn (formerly of Race Horses and currently of Yr Ods) on drums, with contributions from Gareth Bonello (The Gentle Good) on acoustic guitar and cello. Gulp has performed around the UK, Europe and United States and done several UK radio sessions, including for BBC Radio Wales and Sŵn Radio. Their track "Game Love" was included on the compilation Late Night Tales: Django Django, and they released a cover of Django Django's "Hand of Man". Gulp's debut album Season Sun was released in July 2014 on Everloving Records in the US and on Sonic Cathedral in the UK.

Pryce was part of a rare 2012 concert appearance by English singer-songwriter Mark Fry, honouring Fry's 1972 album Dreaming with Alice, along with Nick Franglen of Lemon Jelly, Nick Palmer of The A. Lords, Grasshopper of Mercury Rev and Martin Smith of Tunng.

In 2012, Pryce led music workshops for youth at the charity Grassroots Cardiff Ltd. At Focus Wales 2013, Pryce was a panelist for the Welsh Music Foundation.

Pryce and Leven currently live in Dundee, after years in Cardiff. They have a son.

== Discography ==
=== U Thant ===
- 1989 Dim I.D. EP Recordiau Thant
- 1991 Duwuwd LP Crai/Sain

=== Catatonia ===
- 1993 For Tinkerbell EP Crai/Sain
- 1994 Hooked EP Crai/Sain
- 1998 The Crai-EPs 1993/1994 Crai/Sain

=== The Stand ===
- 2010 "I'll Be There" (fundraising single)

=== Gulp ===
- 2012 '"Game Love" E.L.K. (single)
- 2012 "Hand of Man (Gulp Version)" (from Hi Djinx! Django Django Remixed Because Music)
- 2013 "Play" E.L.K. (single)
- 2014 "Game Love" (from Late Night Tales – Django Django Late Night Tales)
- 2014 "Season Sun" (album)
- 2018 "All Good Wishes" (album)
- 2025 "Beneath Strawberry Moons" (album)

== Filmography ==
- 2000 Beautiful Mistake (Camgymeriad Gwych) (with Super Furry Animals)
- 2004 9 Songs (with Super Furry Animals)
