= Cian Ciaran =

Welsh musician (born 1976)

Cian Ciarán
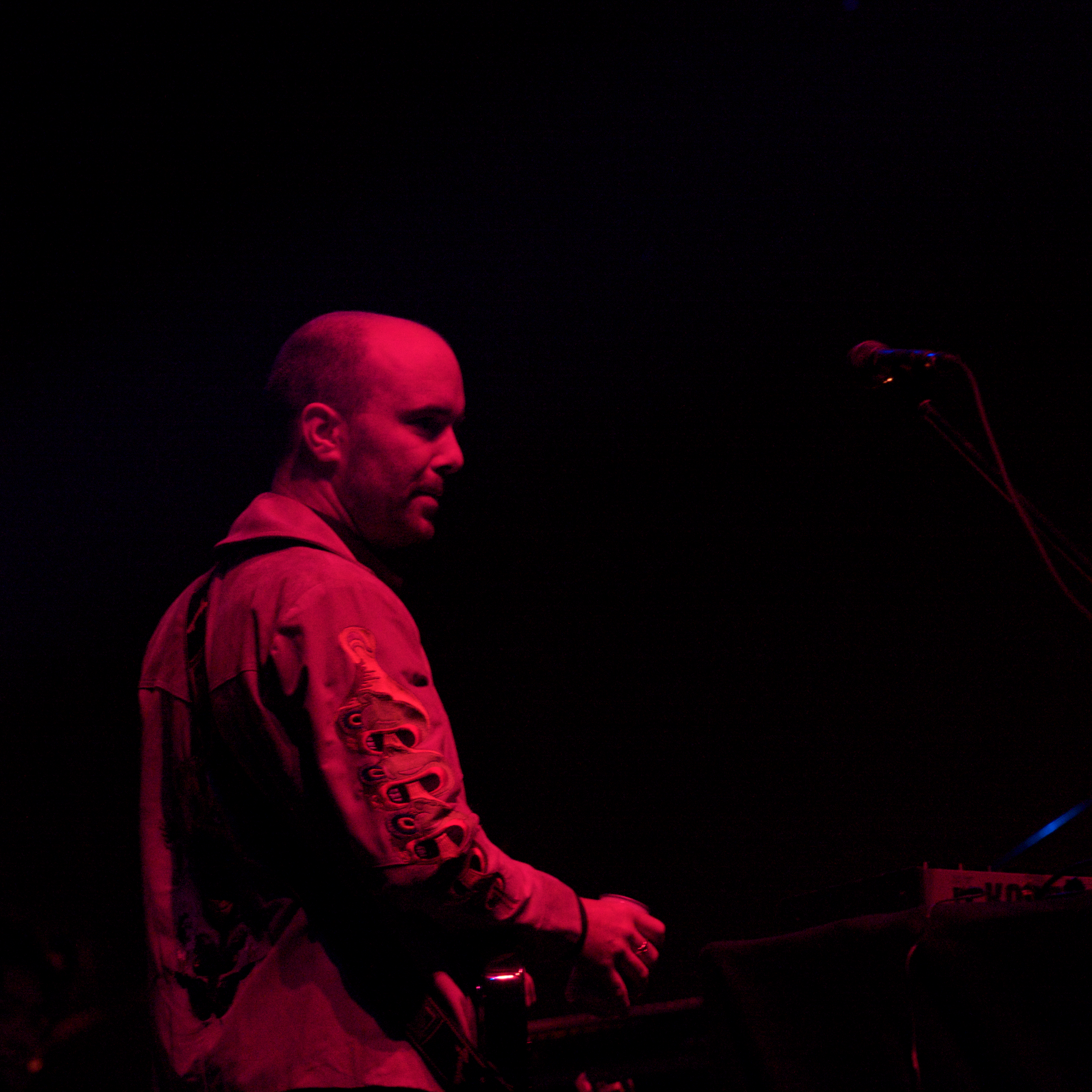
- Ciarán performing with Super Furry Animals at the Summer Sonic Festival, Tokyo, Japan on 10 August 2008

Background information
- Born: 16 June 1976 (age 50); Bangor, Wales
- Occupations: Musician, songwriter, producer
- Instruments: Keyboards guitar backing vocals drums

Cian Ciarán (born 16 June 1976) is a Welsh musician best known as the keyboard player in the band Super Furry Animals. In addition to keyboards, he plays guitar and drums and sings, and is a songwriter, composer and producer.

== Career ==
Cian was born in Bangor, Wales. Prior to the formation of Super Furry Animals, he played in the electronica groups Wwzz and Aros Mae. He has been a member of techno collective Acid Casuals and is currently producing under the names Paps, Kirkland and as himself. He has guested with, produced and mixed several artists, including Kaiser Chiefs, Mogwai, and Manic Street Preachers.

His debut solo single "Martina Franca", was released in June 2012, with the full album, Outside In, released in July 2012 on Strangetown Records. Ciarán's second solo album, They Are Nothing Without Us, was released in 2013.

In 2013 and 2014 Ciarán took part in several anti-nuclear and pro-clean energy protests, including a solo performance at the top of a wind turbine in Norfolk in September 2013. In 2013, he travelled to Fukushima, Japan to witness the devastation from the nuclear power plant meltdown in the wake of the 2011 earthquake and tsunami. He appeared as a guest on the Channel 5 programme The Wright Stuff in 2013 to discuss his views.

Ciarán is also label manager for SomBom and Strangetown Records. As part of Strange Village, a television production company, Cian and his brother Dafydd Ieuan were presented with a BAFTA Cymru Award for the soundtrack to Pen Talar, and were nominated for awards in 2012 for Alys and 2013 for Gerallt.

== Personal life ==
Cian's brother is musician Dafydd Ieuan and he also has two sisters. His father, Dr. Carl Iwan Clowes OBE, was an anti-nuclear campaigner, health consultant and official consulate in Wales for African country Lesotho. His mother's name is Dorothi. Cian's ex-partner is musician Estelle Ios. The two lead the band Zefur Wolves, while Ios is also a member of the group Baby Queens, which Cian managed as part of Strangetown Records.

== Campaigner ==
In September 2018, Ciaran launched a legal challenge against the decision by EDF to dredge mud from the seabed near the Hinkley Point C building site in Somerset, and dump it in the Bristol Channel near Cardiff Bay. On behalf of the Campaign Against Hinkley Mud Dumping, he submitted an application for an interim injunction against the dumping.

== Discography ==
=== Solo albums ===
- Outside In (2012) Dell'Orso Records
- They Are Nothing Without Us (2013) Strangetown Records
- Rhys a Meinir (2016) Strangetown Records
- 20 Millisieverts Per Year (2018) Strangetown Records

=== Acid Casuals ===
- "Omni" (2006) Placid Casual Recordings

=== Ciaran & Wilding ===
- "Missing Her" / "Stuck in the Middle" (singles, 2014) Strangetown Records

=== Zefur Wolves ===
- Zefur Wolves (2015) Strangetown Records
- The Truth Is In The Stars (2019) Strangetown Records

== Filmography ==
2000 Beautiful Mistake (Camgymeriad Gwych) (with Super Furry Animals) (himself)
2004 9 Songs (with Super Furry Animals) (himself)
