= Huw Bunford =

Welsh musician (born 1967)

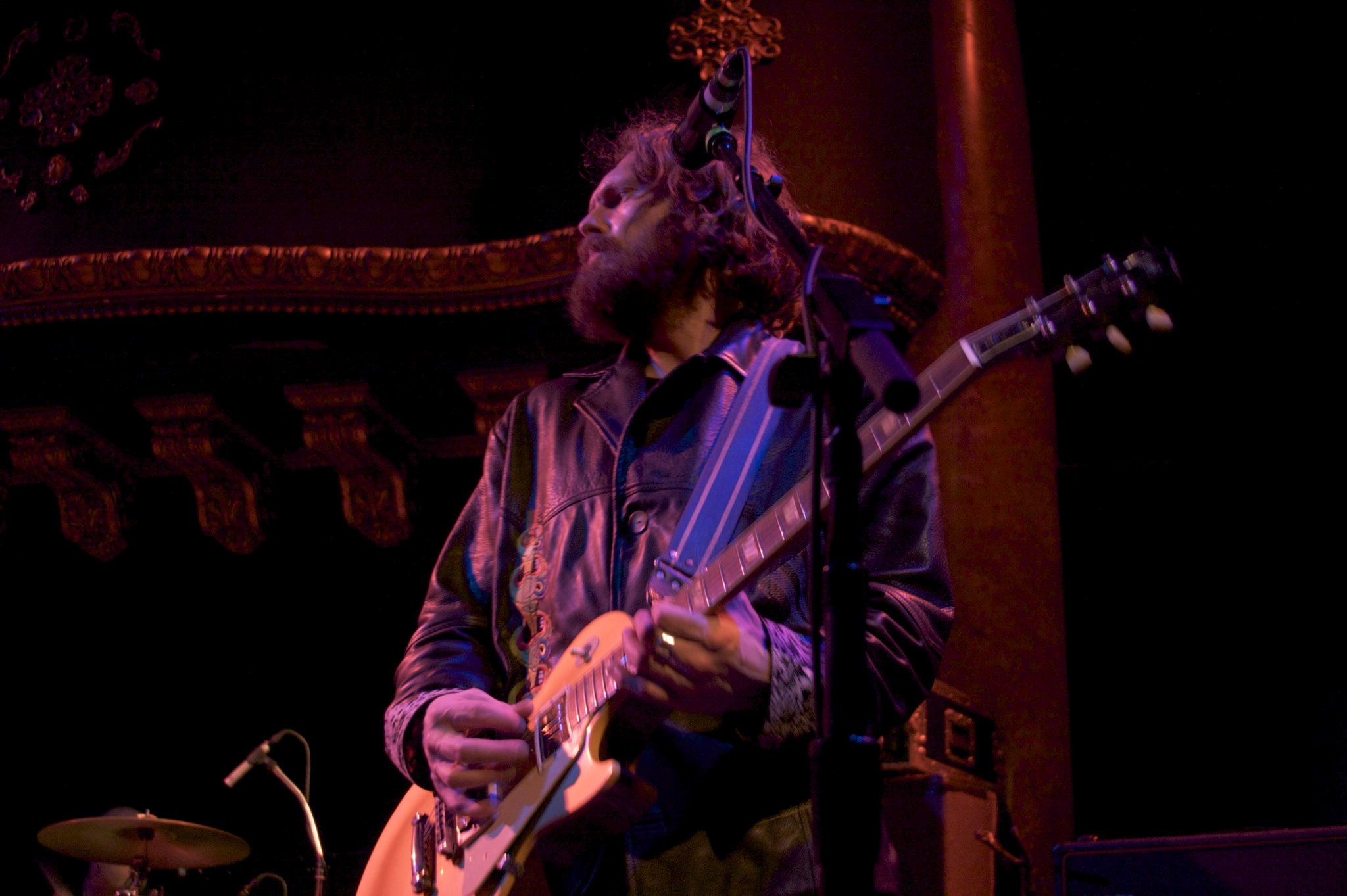
- Bunford performing with Super Furry Animals at the Great American Music Hall, San Francisco, California on 9 February 2008

Background information
- Also known as: Bunf
- Born: Huw Cennydd Bunford; 15 September 1967 (age 58); Cardiff, Wales
- Genres: Alternative rock Indie rock
- Occupations: Musician, songwriter
- Instruments: Guitar; Cello; Pedal steel Backing vocals

Huw "Bunf" Bunford (born Huw Cennydd Bunford; 15 September 1967 in Cardiff, Wales) is a musician best known as the guitarist in Super Furry Animals.

== Biography ==
Bunford studied at Lanchester Polytechnic (now Coventry University) and worked as a teacher. His last teaching position was Head of Art at Ysgol Gyfun Rhydfelen near Pontypridd.

Bunford's first band was the Welsh language school band Edrych am Jiwlia (in Welsh) which was formed in Ysgol Gyfun Gymraeg Glantaf, Cardiff. From 1989 he played with Guto Pryce in the punk band U Thant, before they both joined Super Furry Animals.

In 2012 Bunford performed a mix of found sounds with artist Naomi Kashiwagi at the Whitworth Art Gallery of University of Manchester. In 2013 he released music with Richard Chester under the band name Pale Blue Dots. Several songs were aired on BBC Radio Wales and C2 in Wales, and were posted on the group's SoundCloud page.

Bunford also later studied film scoring and soundtrack production and has contributed to several film productions.

In 2019 Bunford and three other members of Super Furry Animals formed a new group under the name Das Koolies, an alter ego SFA used around 2000 for an experimental electronic album that was never officially released. The only member of SFA not involved in Das Koolies is Gruff Rhys, who continues to work as a solo artist. Das Koolies released their debut album, DK.01, in October 2023.

== Discography ==
=== U Thant ===
- 1989 Dim I.D. EP Recordiau Thant
- 1991 Duwuwd LP Crai/Sain

== Filmography ==
- 2000 Beautiful Mistake (Camgymeriad Gwych) (with Super Furry Animals) (himself)
- 2004 9 Songs (with Super Furry Animals) (himself)
