= Dafydd Ieuan =

Welsh drummer (born 1969)

- Born: 1 March 1969 (age 57); Bangor, Gwynedd, Wales
- Origin: Cardiff, Wales
- Genres: Alternative rock, hard rock, pop rock
- Occupation: Drummer

Dafydd Ieuan (born 1 March 1969) is a Welsh musician, best known as the drummer with the band Super Furry Animals, The Peth and The Earth.

Ieuan played with Gruff Rhys in their early band Ffa Coffi Pawb. He was a drummer for Welsh band Catatonia from 1993 to 1996, recording on their early singles and debut album Way Beyond Blue (1996). During the same period, Super Furry Animals formed and Ieuan left Catatonia to focus on them.

Ieuan runs the Cardiff-based label and recording studio Strangetown Records with brother Cian Ciaran and Mick Hilton. With Ciaran, he was awarded by BAFTA Wales 2011 for Original Music for the S4C drama Pen Talar filmed by Fiction Factory.

Ieuan released The Golden Mile with The Peth ("The Thing" in Welsh) in 2008, with Welsh actor Rhys Ifans on vocals. A second album, Crystal Peth has been recorded but has yet to be released. With DJ and rapper Rashid "Wibidi" Omar, he recorded and produced music under the band name Wibidi. In 2013, he recorded with The Earth (band), with guitarist Mark Roberts (formerly of Catatonia), bassist Tristan Marley and vocalist Dionne Bennett.

In 2006, Ieuan played drums on James Dean Bradfield's first solo album The Great Western. Ieuan produced and drummed on tracks on the forthcoming debut album from Gulp (band) with Super Furry Animals bandmate Guto Pryce.

== Personal life ==
He is musician Cian Ciaran's older brother and he has two sisters. His father, Dr. Carl Clowes, OBE, was a health consultant, Welsh language campaigner, anti-nuclear campaigner and was the Honorary Consul in Wales for the African country Lesotho.
