= Bwyd Time =

Studio album by Gorky's Zygotic Mynci
- Released: 17 July 1995
- Genre: Psychedelic folk
- Length: 48:49
- Label: Ankst

Gorky's Zygotic Mynci chronology
Tatay (1994)	Bwyd Time (1995)	Barafundle (1997)

Professional ratings
Review scores
Source	Rating
AllMusic	4/5 stars

Bwyd Time is the third full album by Gorky's Zygotic Mynci. It was released in 1995 and was the band's last album for Ankst. It features, amongst others, Anthony Saffery from Cornershop, who plays sitar on several tracks.

== Track listing ==
1. "Bwyd Time"
2. "Miss Trudy"
3. "Paid Cheto ar Pam"
4. "Oraphis yn Delphie"
5. "Eating Salt is Easy"
6. "Gewn ni Gorffen"
7. "Iechyd Da"
8. "Ymwelwyr a Gwrachod"
9. "The Telescope and the Bonfire"
10. "The Man with Salt Hair"
11. "The Game of Eyes"
12. "Blood Chant"
13. "Ffarm-wr"

Japanese bonus track

14. "12 Impressionistic Soundscapes"

== Personnel ==
Gorky's Zygotic Mynci

- Euros Childs - vocals, piano, organ, synthesizer, piano strings, cello (3), percussion
- John Lawrence - guitar, vocals, recorder, piano (4, 11, 12), organ (4, 9), trombone (4), saxophone (10), bass (10), harmonium (9), shawm (10), percussion
- Richard James - bass, percussion, vocals (5), guitar (5), organ (7)
- Megan Childs - violin, viola, vocals
- Euros Rowlands - drums, backing vocals (7)
- Gorwel Owen - synthesizers (1,8,9,13), celeste (7)
- Alan Holmes - vocals (1,2,3,7), piano strings (2), percussion (4)
- Anthony Saffery - sitar
- Judith Sturm - flute
- Emyr Glyn Williams - trumpet (4)
- Rheinallt H. Rowlands - vocals and guitar (7)
- Evan Warren - poetry (10)
- Clive Mayall - spoken word (10)

Some probably fictional credits are on the album sleeve:

- Ricky Ronco (probably Euros Childs) - vocals, synth, whistle (1)
- Stevie Ronco (probably John Lawrence) - synth bass, slap guitar, slap vocals (1)
- Bwyd Time Male Voice Choir - choir (5,12)
- The Elves - vocals (11)
- All of the band and some of the guests are credited with various heavy artillery on (10) including tanks and nuclear weapons.
