= Jonny (band) =

British musical group

Jonny is a two-person band formed by Norman Blake of Teenage Fanclub and Euros Childs of Gorky's Zygotic Mynci. The two bands toured together in 1997 and Blake contributed to the Gorky's Zygotic Mynci album How I Long to Feel That Summer in My Heart (2001).

Jonny released an EP in 2006 and their debut album on Merge Records in 2011, the latter of which was recorded with Teenage Fanclub bassist Dave McGowan and BMX Bandits drummer Stuart Kidd.

While the band did not release any subsequent albums, Blake and Childs reunited as Jonny for a concert in Strathaven in 2020, a year after Childs had become a member of Teenage Fanclub.

== Discography ==
- Jonny (2011)
