= Patio (album) =

Studio album by Gorky's Zygotic Mynci
- Released: August 1993
- Label: Ankst

Gorky's Zygotic Mynci chronology
Patio (1993)	Tatay (1994)

Patio is the debut album by Gorky's Zygotic Mynci. It was originally released on 10" vinyl only in August 1993 on the Ankst label, and re-issued on CD in June 1995 with nine extra tracks. It is made up of a mixture of live, studio, and home recordings made between 1991 and 1993.

John Cale once named it his favourite ever album.

== Track listing ==
All songs written by Lawrence/Childs unless otherwise stated. Tracks 13–21 appear on the 1995 CD re-release only.

1. "Peanut Dispenser"
2. "Lladd Eich Gwraig"
3. "Dafad yn Siarad"
4. "Mr Groovy"
5. "Ti! Moses" (Lawrence/James/Childs)
6. "Barbed Wire"
7. "Miriam o Farbel"
8. "Oren, Mefus a Chadno"
9. "Gwallt Rhegi Pegi" (Childs)
10. "Sally Webster" (Childs)
11. "Diamonds o Monte Carlo"
12. "Siwt Nofio" (Childs)
13. "Blessed Are the Meek"
14. "Reverend Oscar Marzaroli"
15. "Oren, Mefus a Chadno" (alternative version)
16. "Dean Ser" (Childs)
17. "Siwmper Heb Grys"
18. "Llenni ar Gloi" (Childs)
19. "Anna Apera" (Childs)
20. "Siwt Nofio" (alternative version) (Childs)
21. "Hi ar Gân" (Lawrence/James/Childs)
