= How I Long to Feel That Summer in My Heart =

Studio album by Gorky's Zygotic Mynci
- Released: 18 September 2001
- Genre: Folk pop, psychedelic folk
- Label: Mantra

Gorky's Zygotic Mynci chronology
The Blue Trees (2000)	How I Long to Feel That Summer in My Heart (2001)	Sleep/Holiday (2003)

Professional ratings
Aggregate scores
Source	Rating
Metacritic	79/100
Review scores
Source	Rating
AllMusic	4.5/5 stars
Pitchfork Media	(8.4/10)
Rolling Stone	

How I Long to Feel That Summer in My Heart is the seventh full-length studio album by Gorky's Zygotic Mynci. It was released on 18 September 2001 in the US, and on 24 September 2001 in the UK. It includes the single "Stood on Gold".

== Track listing ==
All tracks are written by Euros Childs.

No.	Title	Length
1.	"Where Does Yer Go Now?"	3:56
2.	"Honeymoon With You"	2:15
3.	"Stood On Gold"	2:54
4.	"Dead-Aid"	3:23
5.	"Cân Megan"	3:18
6.	"Christina"	5:18
7.	"Easy Love"	2:20
8.	"Let Those Blue Skies"	3:01
9.	"These Winds Are In My Heart"	4:24
10.	"How I Long"	4:08
11.	"Her Hair Hangs Long"	5:00
12.	"Hodgeston's Hallelujah"	2:36
Total length:		42:33

== Personnel ==
Euros Childs - vocals, piano, organ, synthesizer, harpsichord, acoustic guitar, omnichord (1), percussion (3,6)

Richard James - electric guitar, acoustic guitars, vocals, bass (1, 6, 12), synthesizer (3)

Megan Childs - violin, vocals, electric piano (1, 5, 8), organ (8), harpsichord (1), harmonium (1)

Rhodri Puw - bass, acoustic guitar, electric guitar, vibraphone (1), drums (4), pedal steel (5, 12), mandolin (5, 6, 11)

Peter Richardson - drums, bass (4, 7), harpsichord (5), vocals (6)

Gorwel Owen - e-bow pedal steel (1), vibraphone (1, 6), organ (2, 8, 9, 10, 11, 12), glockenspiel (2), piano (4, 6, 7), sho (4), e-bow guitar (6), electric piano (6, 9), vocals (6), zither (10), harpsichord and harmonium (12)

Norman Blake - vocals (2, 5)

Ashley Cooke - electric guitar (2)

Les Morrison - banjo (1)

Andy Fung - drums (1, 3, 8), backing vocals (8), percussion (1, 3)

Euros Rowlands - drums (2, 10)

Beti Rhys - harp (3)

Alun Llwyd - vocals (6)

Tony Robinson - trumpet (6, 12)

Matt Sibley - saxophone (6, 12)

Gary Alesbrook - trombone (6), trumpet (12)

Teflon Monkey - squeeze box (9), electric and slide guitar (11)

Harriet Davies - violin (1, 6)

Jacqueline Norrie - violin (1, 6)

Sally Herbert - violin (1, 6)

Sonia Slany - violin (1, 6)

Bruce White - viola (1, 6)

Rebecca Brown - viola (1, 6)

Anthony Lewis - cello (1, 6)

Frank Schaeffer - cello (1, 6)
