= Tatay =

Studio album by Gorky's Zygotic Mynci
- Released: 1 March 1994
- Studios: Stiwdio Ofn, GZM Studios
- Genres: Folk rock, indie rock, progressive rock, rock
- Label: Ankst
- Producers: Alan Holmes, GZM

Gorky's Zygotic Mynci chronology
Patio (1993)	''Tatay'' (1994)	Bwyd Time (1995)

Professional ratings
Review scores
Source	Rating
AllMusic	4/5 stars

Tatay is the second release and first full album by Gorky's Zygotic Mynci. It was released in 1994.

== Track listing ==
1. "Thema o Cartref"
2. "Beth Sy'n Digwydd i'r Fuwch"
3. "Tatay"
4. "Y Ffordd Oren"
5. "Gwres Prynhawn"
6. "Amsermaemaiyndod/cinema"
7. "O, Caroline" (Matching Mole cover)
8. "Naw. E. Pimp"
9. "Kevin Ayers"
10. "When You Hear the Captain Sing"
11. "O, Caroline" (Euros Childs original with same title as cover; sometimes called 'O Caroline II')
12. "Tatay (Moog Mix)"
13. "Anna Apera"
14. "Gegin Nos"
15. "Silff Ffenest"
16. "Backward Dog"

Japanese bonus tracks:

17. "Suzanne"
18. "Monica"
19. "Electric Sailor"
20. "Cinema"

== Personnel ==
Personnel are taken from CD liner notes.

- Euros Childs - vocals, piano, organ, synthesizers, percussion
- John Lawrence - guitar, bass, recorder, trumpet, shawm, vocals, percussion
- Richard James - bass, guitar, piano, organ, percussion
- Megan Childs - violin, vocals
- Osian Evans - drums
- Al Edwards - drums
- Alan Holmes - production, percussion, orchestration
- Gorwel Owen - engineering, flute
- Emyr Glyn Williams - trumpet
