= Bro Myrddin Welsh Comprehensive School =

- Ysgol Gyfun Gymraeg Bro Myrddin (Welsh)
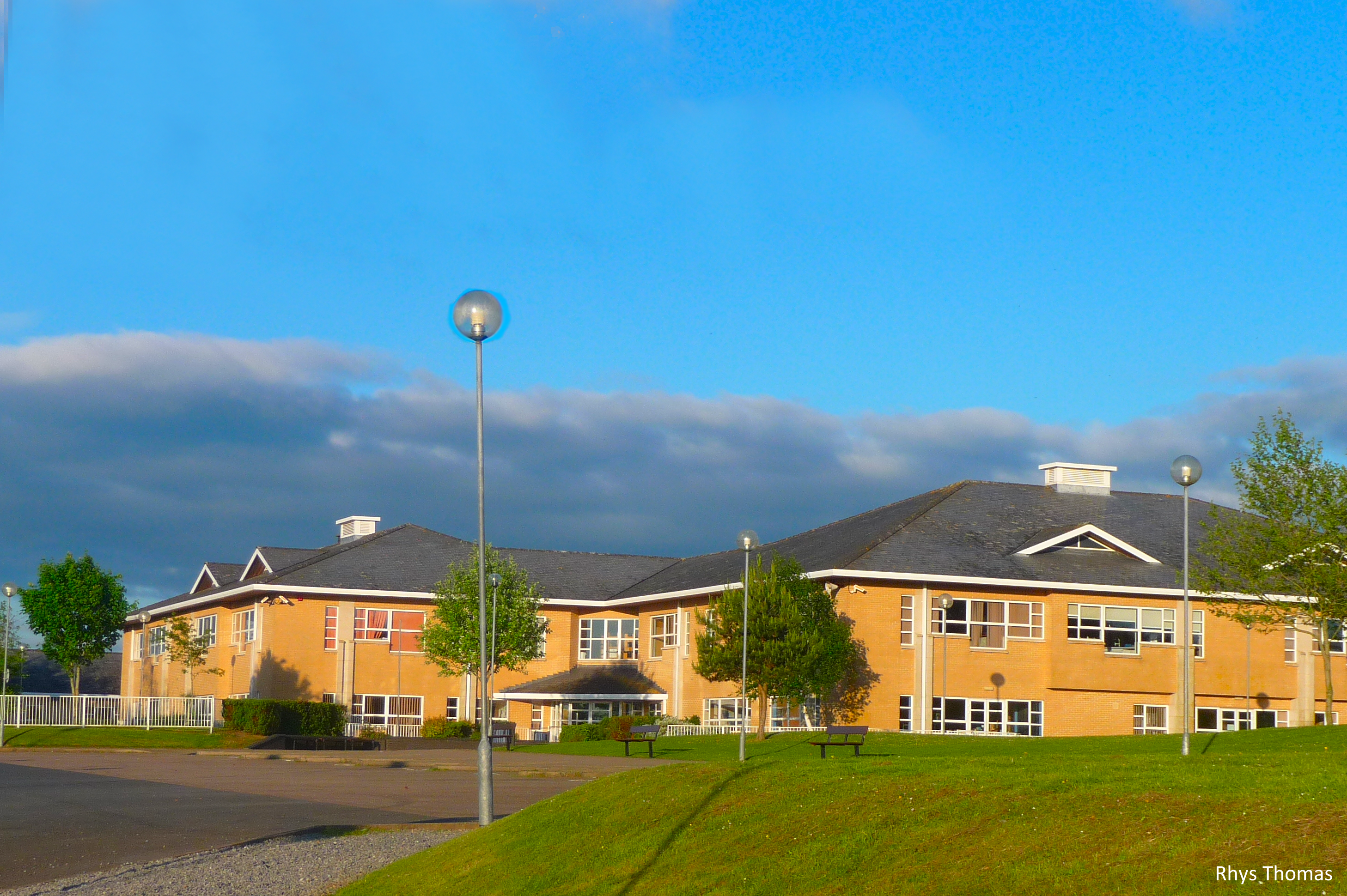
- Current school badge The school in 2009
- Carmarthenshire, SA32 8DN; Wales

Information
- Type: State school
- Motto: Heb Ddysg Heb Ddeall (Without learning there is no understanding)
- Established: 1978
- Local authority: Carmarthenshire County Council
- Headteacher: Carwen Morgan-Davies
- Gender: Male/Female/Non-Binary
- Age: 11 to 19
- Enrolment: 934
- Language: Welsh
- Houses: Hengwrt, Hergest, Llwydiarth and Peniarth
- Colours: Lilac and black
- Website: yggbm.org

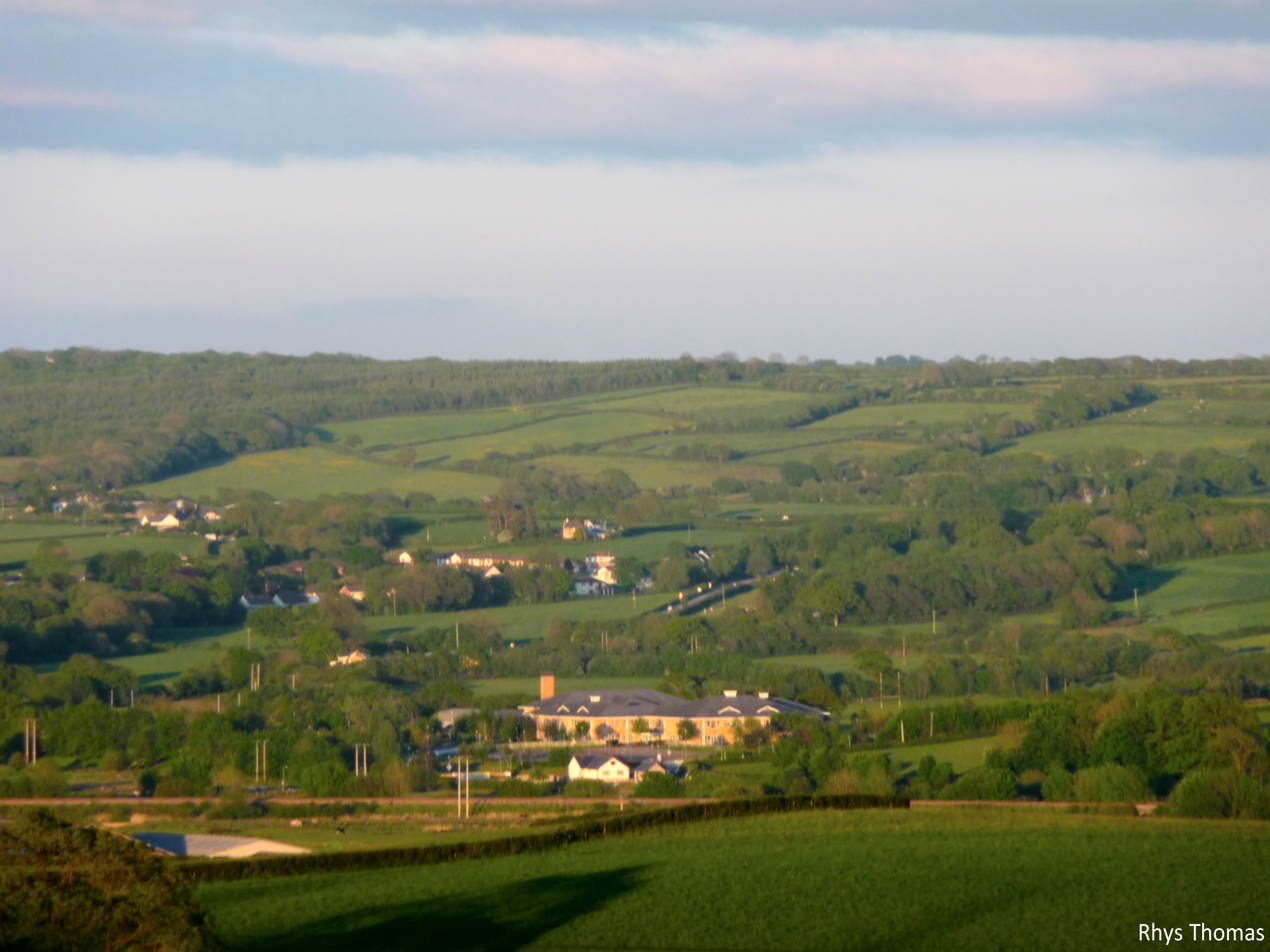
Bro Myrddin from Alltycnap Hill

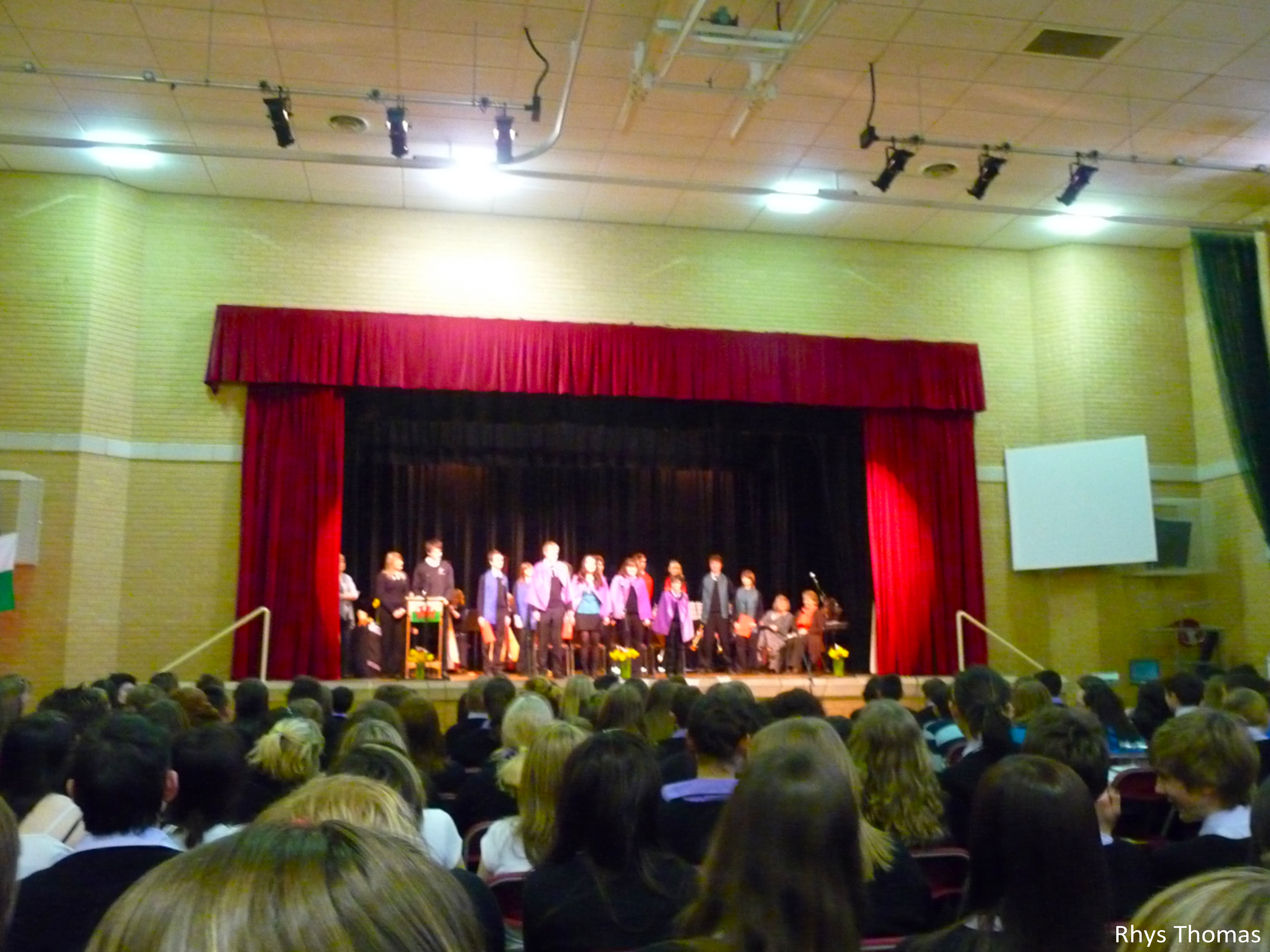
Annual School Eisteddfod, 2009

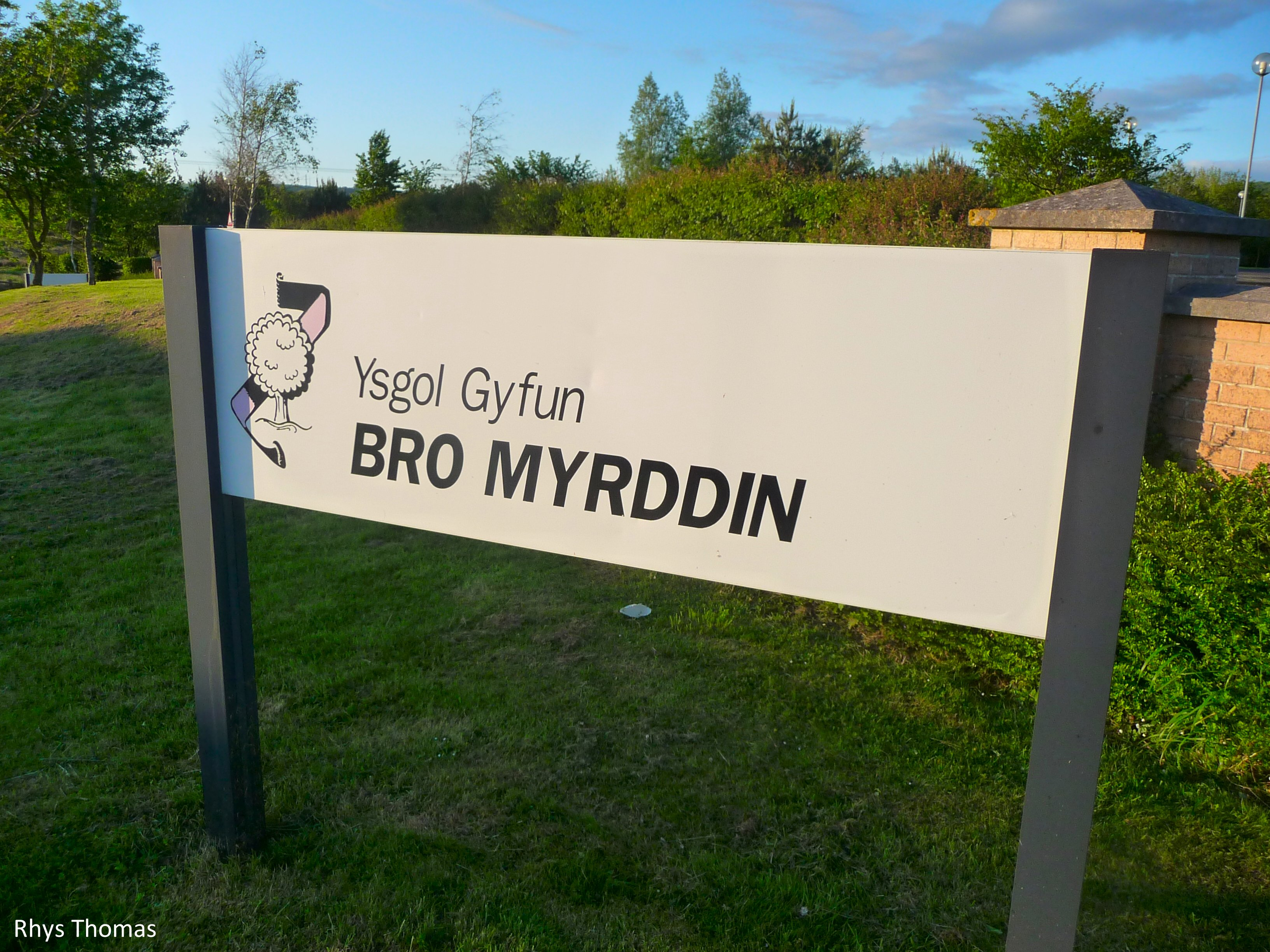
The Entrance Sign

Bro Myrddin Welsh Comprehensive School, also known by its Welsh name Ysgol Gyfun Gymraeg Bro Myrddin, is a Welsh-medium school in Carmarthenshire, Wales. It is situated near the village of Croesyceiliog, about 1 1/4 miles (2 km) south of Carmarthen. Myrddin, the Welsh name of the legendary figure Merlin, is traditionally associated with the town of Carmarthen (Welsh: Caerfyrddin, 'Myrddin's fort'), and Bro Myrddin means "Myrddin's country (or vale)".

According to a 2022 Estyn report 70% of pupils come from Welsh-speaking homes; but all pupils could speak Welsh to first-language standard. Previous reports have rated the school 'Excellent' and the school is often used as a case study. It has been ranked as one of the top 5 state secondary schools in Wales concurrently and often being the top Welsh medium school.

== History ==
The School was founded in 1978, on the premises of the former Queen Elizabeth's Grammar School for Boys, Carmarthen. In 1996 the school was moved to its current purpose-built campus at Croesyceiliog. Its first Pennaeth (Headteacher) was Mr Gareth Evans, who was succeeded upon his retirement in 1997 by Mr Eric Jones, and then by Mr Dorian Williams, in 2006. The Headteacher between 2014 and 2026 was Dr Llinos Jones, who took Mr Williams. The current headteacher is Mrs Carwen Morgan-Davies.

=== Category change ===
In September 2016 the school was changed to a Category CC school, which means that it is a designated Welsh school. Bro Myrddin was first in the county to become a MW school. Furthermore, all National Curriculum subjects are taught in Welsh (except for English), from year 7 in 2016 and for every subsequent year. There were many consultations and discussions with Parents future, past and present, pupils past and present, members of staff and the local community. There were some concerns raised, the main concern was studying in Universities where the Mathematics and Science training is through the medium of English after following a Welsh course at the school, some thought that this would be a disadvantage. On the other hand, there were numerous benefits of this change including that it will encourage the Welsh ethos outside the classroom and reduce the workload of the teachers who currently have to produce bilingual resources.

== Ethos ==
The school's motto is 'Heb Ddysg Heb Ddeall', which translates as 'Without learning there is no understanding'. The school colours are lilac and black.

== Houses ==
The school has four houses (which are referred to using the Welsh 'Llys'): Hengwrt (house colour: green), Hergest (red), Llwydiarth (black) and Peniarth (blue). The four houses annually compete in the school's own version of the Eisteddfod, in which there is a day of singing, playing instruments, reciting and numerous other events – held on the nearest Friday to St David’s day, and a sports day held in the summer term. Numerous other events are held during the year.

== Musical ==
Approximately every 3 years a musical is performed in the local theatre. The 2016 musical was called 'Chwarae Cuddio' ('Hide and Seek' in Welsh). The 2019 musical 'Rhif 1 Heol Penlan' was staged at the Lyric Theatre between the 20th to the 22nd of November. This original musical was about the lively history of the Carmarthen Union Workhouse in 1837.

== Results ==
2007: 82.8% of 15-year-old pupils achieved 5 or more A* – C grades at GCSE or equivalent

2007: 81.9% of 17-year-old pupils achieved 2 or more A – C grades at A/AS level or equivalent

2015: 81.7% of 15-year-old pupils achieved 5 or more A* – C grades at GCSE

2016: 88.0% of 15-year-old pupils achieved 5 or more A* – G grades at GCSE

2019: 87% of 17-year-old pupils achieved A – C grades at A/AS level or equivalent

2024: 64.7% of 15-year-old pupils achieved A* – A grades at GCSE

2024: 76.9% of 17-year-old pupils achieved A – B grades at A/AS level or equivalent

== Curriculum ==
- Core: Welsh, Maths, English and Science
- Humanities: History, Politics, Geography, and Religious Studies
- Creative subjects: Drama, Art and Design, and Music
- Technology: ICT, Resistant Materials, Catering, Health and Social Care, Textiles, Furniture *Manufacture and Graphic products
- Foreign languages: French or Spanish

Other: Business Studies

== Notable alumni ==
Politics

- Nerys Evans – Member of the Senedd, Deputy Minister for Public and Preventative Health
- Llyr Huws Gruffydd – Member of the Senedd, Cabinet Minister for Rural Resilience and Sustainability

Arts

- Euros Childs – Musician, member of Gorky's Zygotic Mynci
- Owain Rhys Davies – Actor
- Richard James – Musician, member of Gorky's Zygotic Mynci
- Elis James – Comedian and actor
- John Lawrence – Musician, member of Gorky's Zygotic Mynci
- Eurig Salisbury – Poet and writer

Sports

- Matthew Bowen – Rugby union player, Ospreys
- Aled Davies - Rugby union player, Llanelli Scarlets, Saracens, Cardiff Rugby and Wales national rugby union team
- Mefin Davies – Rugby union player, Leicester Tigers and Wales national rugby union team
- Ryan Elias – Rugby union player who plays for the Llanelli Scarlets at hooker and Wales national rugby union team
- Eddie James - Rugby union player, Llanelli Scarlets and Wales national rugby union team
- Stephen Jones – Rugby union player, Llanelli Scarlets, Wasps Rugby and Wales national rugby union team
- Emyr Lewis – Rugby union player
- Ken Owens – Rugby union player, Llanelli Scarlets, Wales national rugby union team and British & Irish Lions
- Rhys Priestland – Rugby union player, Llanelli Scarlets, Bath Rugby, Cardiff Rugby and Wales national rugby union team
- Aled Thomas – Rugby union & Rugby Union Sevens player London Welsh, Wales national rugby sevens team
- Matthew Stevens – Professional snooker player
