= Barafundle =

Studio album by Gorky's Zygotic Mynci
- Released: 7 April 1997
- Recorded: Autumn 1996
- Genre: Alternative rock, psychedelic folk, neo-prog, Britpop
- Length: 47:57
- Label: Fontana
- Producer: Gorwel Owen, Gorky's Zygotic Mynci

Gorky's Zygotic Mynci chronology
Bwyd Time (1995)	Barafundle (1997)	Gorky 5 (1998)

Professional ratings
Review scores
Source	Rating
AllMusic	4.5/5 stars
Encyclopedia of Popular Music	5/5 stars
Entertainment Weekly	A−
The Guardian	4/5 stars
NME	8/10
Rolling Stone	3/5 stars
The Rolling Stone Album Guide	3/5 stars
Select	4/5
Sputnikmusic	4.5/5
Wall of Sound	85/100

Barafundle is the fourth album by Welsh psychedelic folk band Gorky's Zygotic Mynci, and was released 7 April 1997 in the United Kingdom. The album's title comes from the name of a beach in Pembrokeshire, Wales.

Songs are often sung in both Welsh and English, and the album's influences range from twee-pop to traditional folk music. Lynn Childs, father of singer Euros and violinist Megan, plays shawm and other traditional instruments on the album's occasional medieval interludes (for example, on "Starmoonsun").

== Singles ==
Two singles were released from the album. The first single, "Patio Song", was released in late 1996 and became the band's highest-charting single in the UK, peaking at #41 in early 1997. The song also ranked #8 on John Peel's 1996 Festive Fifty countdown.

The second single, "Diamond Dew", reached #42 on the UK Singles Chart in mid-1997. A contemporaneous non-album single, "Young Girls & Happy Endings", was also released in 1997 and appeared as a bonus track on some American copies of the album.

== Track listing ==
All songs written by Euros Childs unless otherwise stated.

1. "Diamond Dew" (Childs/James) – 2:50
2. "The Barafundle Bumbler" – 1:53
3. "Starmoonsun" (Lawrence) – 3:04
4. "Patio Song" – 2:43
5. "Better Rooms..." – 3:46
6. "Heywood Lane" (Lawrence/Childs) – 2:52
7. "Pen Gwag Glas" – 3:59
8. "Bola Bola" – 1:53
9. "Cursed, Coined and Crucified" (Lawrence) – 2:27
10. "Sometimes the Father Is the Son" (James) – 3:21
11. "Meirion Wyllt" – 2:48
12. "The Wizard and the Lizard" (Lawrence/Childs) – 1:58
13. "Miniature Kingdoms" (Lawrence/Childs) – 4:17
14. "Dark Night" – 4:49
15. "Hwyl Fawr I Pawb" (M. Childs) – 1:48
16. "Wordless Song" – 3:20
17. "Young Girls & Happy Endings" - 2:25 (US Bonus Track)

== Personnel ==
- Euros Childs – vocals, piano, organ, synths, electric piano, harmonium, guitar (5)
- John Lawrence – guitar, vocals, bass (1, 2), jaw harp (1, 12), electric piano (3), organ (3, 13), recorder (3, 5, 12), piano (9), bodhrán (3)
- Megan Childs – violin, vocals, viola, organ (9), piano (15)
- Richard James – bass, guitar, piano (10), organ (10), synth (4)
- Euros Rowlands – drums, percussion
- Gorwel Owen – piano (2, 16), synth (7)
- Fiona Owen – vocals (6, 11, 14)
- Lynn Childs – shawm, crumhorn
- Tom Rawlins – shawm, crumhorn, hurdy-gurdy
- Stuart Evans – shawm, flute
- Andrew Frizzell – trombone, flute
- Simon James – sax, flute
- Martin Smith – trumpet, marching horn
