= Shy and the Fight =

Shy and The Fight
- Origin: Llangollen, Wales and Chester, England
- Genres: Acoustic folk / indie rock
- Years active: 2010–2014
- Members: Thomas Hyndman; Carrie Anderson; Christopher Done; Tom Wootton; Michael Deponeo; Samuel Williams; Jackson Almond
- Past members: Meg Myatt
- Website: www.shyandthefight.net

Shy and The Fight were a seven-piece Welsh acoustic folk / indie rock band from Llangollen, Wales and Chester, England. The band included Tom Hyndman (guitar, lead vocals), Carrie Anderson (violin, backing vocals), Christopher Done (bass, backing vocals), Michael Deponeo (lead guitar, vocals), Tom Wootton (drums), Samuel Williams (drums) and Jackson Almond (piano, banjo).

The band have released two EPs, Shy and the Fight (2010), and First the Bird Fell (2014) plus one 7" vinyl single, "All That We See or Seem" / "Breaks" (Popty Ping, 2012). The group disbanded in 2014.

== History ==
The band formed following Tom Hyndman's departure from Out From Animals / Scams, following Scams' performance at SXSW in 2010. Initially they were a 6-piece, with the later addition of Williams on drums. A first EP, a limited CD pressing titled Shy and the Fight at the tail end of 2010, sold out. The EP came to the attention of BBC Radio Wales's Adam Walton, who quickly playlisted the band for his show. A booking for the Stop Making Sense festival 2010 in Croatia soon followed. They cited their influences as Sufjan Stevens, Frank Turner, Elliott Smith, Villagers, The Delgados, Arcade Fire and Los Campesinos.

April 2011 saw the use of the EP track How to Stop an Imploding Man as the soundtrack to the Jack Wills controversial Easter 2011 advertising campaign. The campaign was ultimately banned by the Advertising Standards Authority. The track also picked up additional BBC Radio 1 airplay from Jen Long, alongside further national attention from the Welsh media and an appearance at the 2011 Chester Rocks festival.

At Adam Walton's request, the band recorded a BBC Introducing session with John Lawrence of Gorky's Zygotic Mynci in early 2011. Following success with the session, Walton placed them in his BBC Wales Music Blog tips for 2012.

2012 saw the completion of a set of recording sessions in Chester with producer Gary Lloyd, the renowned composer and collaborator of Alan Moore on Brought to Light.

The band released their debut single "All That We See or Seem" / "Breaks" (produced by Gary Lloyd) on 29 April 2012 via newly formed independent Welsh record label, Popty-Ping. The single was released via limited edition (500 only) orange vinyl 7", attracting acclaimed reviews and further airplay from Radio 1's Jen Long, Adam Walton, BBC Merseyside's Dave Monks, BBC East Midlands Dean Jackson and Amazing Radio's Shell Zenner.

The band then played shows with Ed Sheeran, The Daydream Club, Gideon Conn, The Travelling Band and Nile Marr.

The first single release was supplemented with appearances at the 2012 Wychwood Festival at the request of BBC 6 Music's Tom Robinson and at the 2012 Sŵn festival, curated by Huw Stephens and John Rostron. The Swn appearance collated reviews in God Is in the TV, Virtual Festivals and others.

Steve Lamacq gave preview track "Stop Motion" a first play on BBC Radio 2 in November 2012, intended for release on the band's next EP.

In July 2014, the band announced their split with the release of their final EP, First the Bird Fell.

Some members of the band continue to make music as part of Campfire Social.

== Discography ==
=== Extended plays ===
Year	EP Details
2010	Shy and the Fight: Released: August 2010; Label: self released
2014	First the Bird Fell: Released: July 2014; Label: self released

=== Singles ===
Year	Single Details
2012	"All That We See or Seem" / "Breaks": Released: April 2012; Label: Popty-Ping
