= Jonny (Jonny album) =

Studio album by Jonny
- Released: April 12, 2011
- Genre: Indie pop
- Length: 49:26
- Label: Merge Records, Alsatian/Turnstile

Jonny is the debut album by the duo Jonny, consisting of Norman Blake of Teenage Fanclub and Euros Childs of Gorky's Zygotic Mynci. The album was recorded with Teenage Fanclub bassist Dave McGowan and BMX Bandits drummer Stuart Kidd. Uncut placed the album at number 36 on its list of "Top 50 albums of 2011".

== Track listing ==
1. Wich Is Wich 1:41
2. Candyfloss 2:58
3. Waiting Around for You 2:17
4. Goldmine 2:28
5. You Was Me 3:11
6. Circling the Sun 3:01
7. English Lady 3:33
8. The Good Night 2:39
9. Bread 2:17
10. Cave Dance 10:42
11. I Want to Be Around You 2:15
12. I'll Make Her My Best Friend 1:38
13. Never Alone 1:55
14. Gloria* 1:43
15. Beach Party* 1:49
16. Continental* 2:37
17. Michael Angelo* 2:44

*These tracks were not on the original Alsatian/Turnstile release in the UK.
