= Gorky 5 =

Album by Gorky's Zygotic Mynci

Studio album by Gorky's Zygotic Mynci
- Released: 27 August 1998
- Genre: Rock
- Length: 42:19
- Label: Mercury
- Producer: Gorwel Owen, Gorky's Zygotic Mynci

Gorky's Zygotic Mynci chronology
Barafundle (1997)	Gorky 5 (1998)	Spanish Dance Troupe (1999)

Professional ratings
Review scores
Source	Rating
AllMusic	3/5 stars
The Guardian	4/5 stars

Gorky 5 is the fifth album by Welsh band Gorky's Zygotic Mynci, released on 27 August 1998. It was their last album for Mercury Records and features the singles "Let's Get Together (In Our Minds)" and "Sweet Johnny".

== Track listing ==
All songs written by E. Childs, unless otherwise stated.

1. "The Tidal Wave" – 3:04
2. "Dyle Fi" – 3:00
3. "Let's Get Together (In Our Minds)" – 3:15
4. "Tsunami" – 3:42 (Lawrence)
5. "Not Yet" – 3:41 (Lawrence)
6. "Only the Sea Makes Sense" – 2:45
7. "Softly" – 5:59 (Lawrence)
8. "Frozen Smile" – 1:24
9. "Sweet Johnny" – 4:42
10. "Theme from Gorky 5 (Russian Song)" – 4:06
11. "Hush the Warmth" – 3:28
12. "Catrin" – 3:06

== Personnel ==
- Euros Childs - vocals, piano, organ, electric piano, synths, timpani (1), bass (5), guitar (6)
- John Lawrence - guitar, vocals, piano (4,5,7), mandolin (3,4), organ (2,4,5), bass (12), pedal steel (4,6), electric piano (6)
- Richard James - bass, guitar (5,6,11,12), organ (9)
- Megan Childs - violin, vocals, viola (2)
- Euros Rowlands - drums, percussion, sub-bass (7)
- Gorwel Owen - vox bass (1), synth (11), harmonium (12)
- Lindsay Higgs - balalaika (10)
- Sonia Slany - violin and string arrangements (3,4)
- Anna Hemery - violin (3,4)
- Jackie Norry - violin (3,4)
- Julie Singleton - violin (3,4)
- Jocelyn Pook - viola (3,4)
- Jackie Woods - viola (3,4)
- Dinah Beamish - cello (3,4)
- Sophie Harris - cello (3,4)
