= Zabrinski =

UK alternative rock group

- Origin: Carmarthen, Wales
- Genres: Neo-psychedelia; Alternative rock
- Years active: Late 1990s–2007
- Label: Ankst
- Past members: Matthew Durbridge; Iwan Morgan; Gareth Richardson; Rhun Lenny; Owain Jones; Kris Jenkins; Phil Jenkins; Ed Truckell; Emyr Harries; Michael Richardson

Zabrinski were an alternative rock band from Carmarthen and Cardiff, Wales. They formed in the late 1990s and released four albums before splitting up in 2007.

== History ==
Misnamed after the 1970 film Zabriskie Point, the band was formed by school friends Matthew Durbridge (vocals, guitar), Iwan Morgan (electronica/keyboards), and Gareth Richardson (guitar) in Carmarthen. They relocated to Cardiff and took on further members, Rhun Lenny (bass) and Owain Jones (drums). Their debut album, Screen Memories was released on their own Microgram label, and led to a deal with Ankst. In March 2001, the band's Ankst debut, Yeti was released, described by the South Wales Echo as "a collection of 10 tracks just bristling with ambition", and the band also recorded a session for John Peel's BBC Radio 1 show. Yeti drew comparisons with such varied artists as New Order, Aphex Twin, and Flaming Lips. The same year, they supported Gorky's Zygotic Mynci on their UK tour, and they also toured several times with Super Furry Animals. They were nominated for three Welsh Music Awards in 2001. The band's third album, Koala Ko-ordination was issued in 2002 now with Kris Jenkins on keyboards, with comparisons again to Flaming Lips, and also to Super Furry Animals and Gorky's Zygotic Mynci. The album was described as "Very strange. Rather marvellous" by the Sunday Times, and "a beguiling album that is both smart and warm" by the Daily Express. The band's last album, Ill Gotten Game was released in 2005, and was described by the BBC as "a many faceted work of wonder", but disappointing sales contributed to the band splitting up in 2007. The band's final performance was at the Gwyl Macs Fest in Carmarthen on 1 September 2007.

In February 2018, the band tweeted that they will be releasing new music later in the year.

== Discography ==
=== Albums ===
- Screen Memories (2000) Microgram
- Yeti (2001) Ankst
- Koala Ko-ordination (2002) Ankst
- Ill Gotten Game (2005) Ankstmusic

=== Singles ===
- "Freedom of the Hiway" (2001) Booby Trap
- Executive Decision EP

=== Compilations ===
- "Celwyddwalt" on Kat Vox:A CD To Celebrate 20 Years of timmi-kat ReCoRDS (2011) timmi-kat ReCoRDS
