= Zoë Skoulding =

Poet born 1967

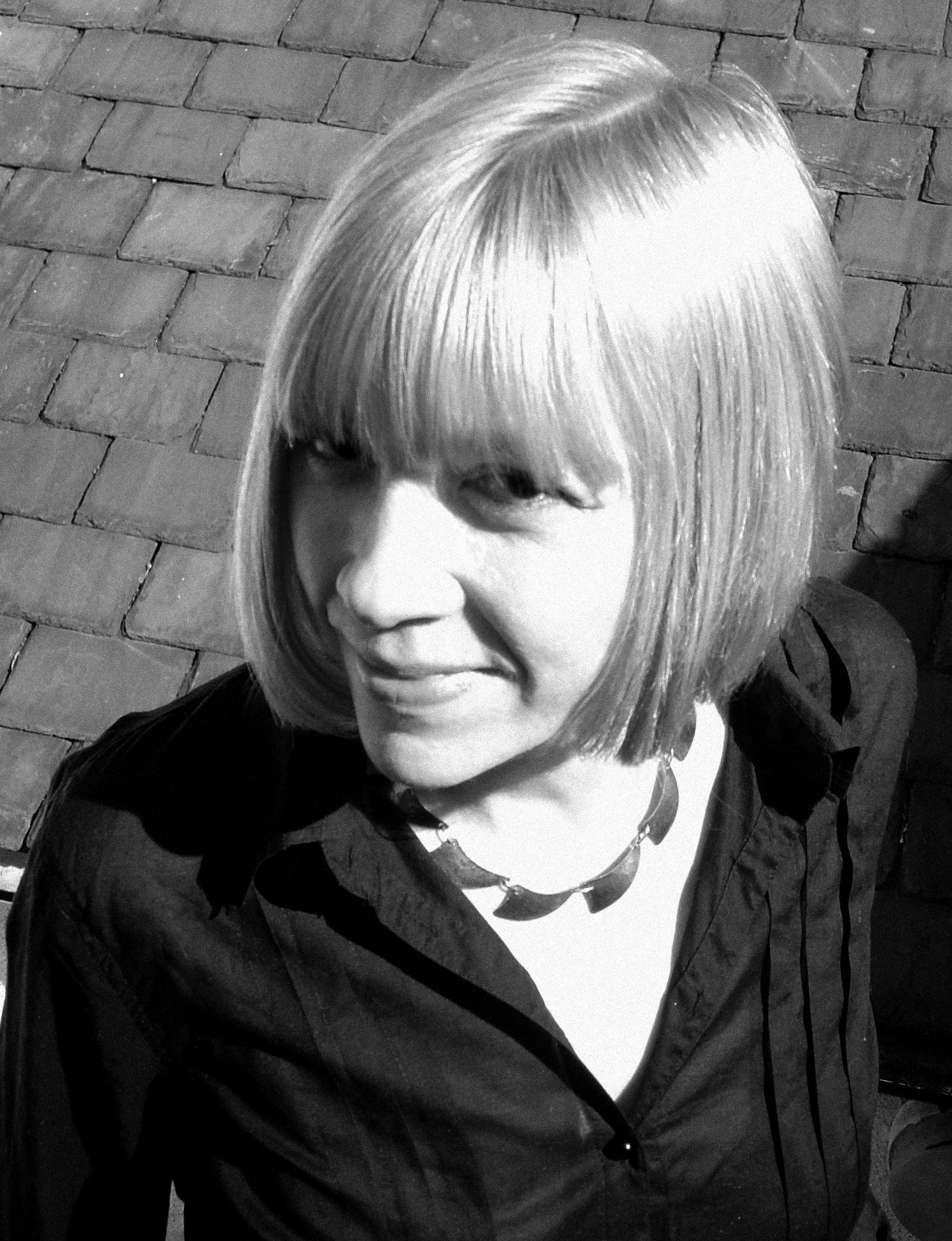
- Born: 18 November 1967 (age 58); Bradford, England
- Occupation: Poet
- Writing career
- Language: English / French / Spanish
- Period: 1996–
- Website: www.zoeskoulding.co.uk

Zoë Skoulding FLSW is a poet, living in Wales, whose work encompasses translation, editing, sound-based vocal performance, literary criticism and teaching creative writing. Her poetry has been widely anthologised, translated into over 25 languages and presented at numerous international festivals.

== Career ==
Skoulding is Professor of Poetry and Creative Writing at Bangor University, where her research explores urban space, sound, ecopoetics, contemporary experimental poetry and translation. She has been involved in several collaborative poetry translation projects, including Metropoetica, and has translated from French the selected poems of Luxembourg poet Jean Portante.

In 2018 she received a Cholmondeley Award from the Society of Authors for the achievement and distinction of her body of work and her contribution to poetry. Her collection Footnotes to Water won the poetry category in the Wales Book of the Year awards, 2020.

As Editor of Poetry Wales from 2008 to 2014, she maintained the magazine's international focus and broadened its scope to include more experimental forms of poetry.

Her musical collaborations include the psychogeographical collective Parking Non-Stop and sound art/poetry performances with Alan Holmes.

In the 1990s, Skoulding wrote lyrics for the Welsh musicians Rheinallt H Rowlands and David Wrench, with whom she also played bass. She recorded and performed with the "anglo-welsh kosmische supergroup" The Serpents.

In 2021, Skoulding was elected a Fellow of the Learned Society of Wales.

== Personal life ==
Zoë Skoulding was born in Bradford, United Kingdom in 1967. Having lived in East Anglia, India and Belgium, she now resides in North Wales with her musician husband, Alan Holmes.

== Bibliography ==
=== Poetry collections ===
- 1998 Tide Table
- 2004 The Mirror Trade
- 2007 Dark Wires (with Ian Davidson)
- 2008 From Here (with Simonetta Moro)
- 2008 Remains of a Future City
- 2013 The Museum of Disappearing Sounds
- 2016 Teint: For the Bièvre
- 2018 Las habitaciones y otros poemas [Translators: Katherine Hedeen and Victor Rodríguez Núñez]
- 2019 Footnotes to Water
- 2020 A Revolutionary Calendar
- 2022 A Marginal Sea

=== Other publications ===
- 2009 You Will Live in Your Own Cathedral (trilingual (En/Cz/D) booklet and audio CD with Alan Holmes, Richard Hopewell, Huw Jones, Monika Rinck, Eva Klimentova, Alexandra Buchler)
- 2008 Crwydro / Marcheurs Des Bois: A Wales Quebec Ambulation (with Daniel Poulin and Simon Whitehead)
- 2013 Metropoetica – Poetry and urban space: women writing cities (with Ingmāra Balode, Julia Fiedorczuk, Sanna Karlström, Ana Pepelnik, Sigurbjörg Þrastardóttir, Elżbieta Wójcik-Leese)
- 2013 Placing Poetry (edited with Ian Davidson)

=== Poems in anthologies ===
- 2008 Women's Work: Modern Women Poets Writing in English (ed. Amy Wack and Eva Salzman, Seren)
- 2010 Identity Parade (ed. Roddy Lumsden, Bloodaxe)
- 2010 Infinite Difference: Other Poetries by UK Women Poets (ed. Carrie Etter, Shearsman)
- 2011 The Ground Aslant: Radical Landscape Poetry (ed. Harriet Tarlo, Shearsman)
- 2012 Best British Poetry 2012 (ed. Sasha Dugdale, Salt)
- 2015 Out of Everywhere 2: Linguistically innovative poetry by women in the USA and UK (ed. Emily Critchley, Reality Street)
- 2021 Poetry and Covid-19 (ed. Anthony Caleshu and Rory Waterman, Shearsman)
- 2021 Last Kind Words (ed. Peter Riley, Shearsman)

=== Monographs ===
- 2013 Contemporary Women’s Poetry and Urban Space: Experimental Cities (Palgrave Macmillan).
- 2020 Poetry and listening: the noise of lyric (Liverpool University Press 2020)

== Discography ==
- 1996 Rheinallt H Rowlands – Bukowski
- 1997 David Wrench – Black Roses
- 1997 David Wrench – Blow Winds Blow
- 1997 David Wrench – The Ballad of the Christmas Tree and the Silver Birch
- 1998 The Serpents – No Mask, No Cloak, Dim Gobaith
- 1999 The Serpents – You Have Just Been Poisoned by the Serpents
- 2001 Various artists – Infrasonic Waves
- 2006 Faust – Faust... in Autumn
- 2007 Various artists – Klangbad Festival 2007
- 2008 Parking Non-Stop - Species Corridor
- 2009 Zoë Skoulding - You Will Live in Your Own Cathedral
- 2010 Parking Non-Stop - Cold Star

== Selected international performances ==
- 2008 Medana Festival, Slovenia
- 2008 Nødutgang Festival, Bodø, Norway
- 2009 Ars Poetica, Bratislava
- 2009 Vilenica Festival, Slovenia (with Metropoetica)
- 2009 Berlin Poesiefestival
- 2009 AWEN International Festival of Poetry and Film, ATRiuM, Cardiff
- 2010 Readings/performances in Pondicherry, Chennai, Pune and Trivandrum as part of Poetry Connections with Literature Across Frontiers in association with the British Council
- 2010 Riga Poetry Evenings, Latvia (with Metropoetica)
- 2010 Lyd+Litteratur Aarhus, Denmark
- 2010 Printemps de Poètes, Luxembourg
- 2010 The Other Room Series, Manchester
- 2010 Granada International Festival of Poetry, Nicaragua
- 2011 Café Fra, Prague
- 2011 Wroclaw Port Festival, Poland (with Metropoetica)
- 2011 Dasein Café, Athens
- 2011 Ledbury Festival (with Poetry Connections)
- 2011 World Festival of Poetry, Venezuela
- 2011 Struga Poetry Evenings, Macedonia
- 2011 Novi Sad Literature Festival, Serbia
- 2011 Control Club, Bucharest (with Parking Non-Stop)
- 2011 Bodø Festival, Norway (with Parking Non-Stop)
- 2012 Ars Cameralis, Katowice
- 2012 Poets Live, Paris
- 2012 Dinefwr Festival
- 2012 Fiction Fiesta, Cardiff
- 2013 Stanza Festival, St Andrews
- 2013 Prague Bookworld
- 2013 Reading Poetry Festival
- 2013 Avant-Garde Festival, Schiphorst
- 2015 Izmir Poetry Festival, Turkey
- 2016 Managua Poetry Festival, Nicaragua
- 2016 Bursa Poetry Festival, Turkey
- 2017 Guayaquil International Poetry Festival, Ecuador
- 2017 Inizjamed Malta Mediterranean Literature Festival
- 2017 Luna de Locos Pereira International Poetry Festival, Colombia
- 2018 Safi Poetry Forum, Morocco
- 2018 University of California, Berkeley, USA
- 2018 International Poetry Festival of Costa Rica
- 2018 Ars Poetica, Slovakia
- 2019 Medellín International Poetry Festival, Colombia
- 2019 Double Change, Paris, France
- 2019 Festival Internacional de Poesía de Santiago de Chile
- 2022 Festival international de la Poésie de Trois Rivières, Québec
- 2022 Oroboro, Montréal, Québec
