= Gorwel Owen =

Welsh record producer and musician

Gorwel Owen is a Welsh producer and musician who has played a key role in the Welsh musical world since the early 1980s. His work was acknowledged through the Special Contribution Award from Y Selar magazine in 2025. As well as being a member of two influential bands in the 1980s/90s - Plant Bach Ofnus and Eirin Peryglus - he has worked with Datblygu, Gorky's Zygotic Mynci, Super Furry Animals, Gruff Rhys, Euros Childs, Hwyl Nofio, Ffa Coffi Pawb, Gwenno Saunders, Steve Eaves, Melys, Bob Delyn a'r Ebillion, Ffandango, Llio Rhydderch and many others. He also co-writes, records and performs with his wife, the poet Fiona Owen; their third album Releasing Birds was released in 2015 via their label Yamoosh!. His work encompasses many styles of music, with a tendency towards the experimental, but also with strong connections to various traditions, including songs and historical ballads, free improvisation, composition and sound installation.

== Discography ==
- Super Furry Animals - Fuzzy Logic, 1996 - co-producer
- Gorky's Zygotic Mynci - Barafundle, 1997 - co-producer
- Super Furry Animals - Radiator, 1997 - co-producer
- Gorky's Zygotic Mynci - Gorky 5, 1998 - co-producer
- Gorky's Zygotic Mynci - The Blue Trees, 1997 - co-producer
- Gorky's Zygotic Mynci - Spanish Dance Troupe, 1999 - co-producer
- Super Furry Animals - Mwng, 2000 - co-producer
- Gorky's Zygotic Mynci - How I Long to Feel That Summer in My Heart, 2001 - co-producer
- Pondman - In Between, 2002 - co-writer and performer
- Euros Childs - Chops, 2006 - co-producer
- Hwyl Nofio - Hounded by Fury, 2006 - performer
- Fiona & Gorwel Owen - Spring Always Comes, 2008 - co-writer and performer
- Gruff Rhys - Hotel Shampoo, 2010 - co-producer
- Fiona & Gorwel Owen Releasing Birds (Yamoosh!), 2015 - co-writer and performer
- Gwenno Le Kov (Heavenly), 2018 - engineer
- Llio Rhydderch Sir Fôn Bach (Fflach), 2019 - engineer
- Steve Eaves Y dal yn dynn, y tynnu’n rhydd (Sain), 2019 - co-producer
- Gorwel Owen Craig y Llew (Ofn), 2025 - writer and performer
- Melys Second Wind (Sylem), 2025 - mixing engineer
- Fiona & Gorwel Owen Hela'r Dryw (Ofn), 2025 - arranger and performer
