= Chops (Euros Childs album) =

Studio album by Euros Childs
- Released: 13 February 2006
- Recorded: September 2004 – July 2005
- Length: 33:27
- Label: Wichita Recordings; WEBB094(CD)/(LP)
- Producer: Euros Childs & Gorwel Owen

Euros Childs chronology
Chops (2006)	Bore Da (2007)

Professional ratings
Review scores
Source	Rating
Art Rocker	(not rated) link
The Guardian	link
HARP	(not rated) link
Yahoo! Music	link

Chops is the debut solo album by Euros Childs, frontman of Gorky's Zygotic Mynci, released in February 2006.

== Track listing ==
1. "Billy the Seagull" – 0:49
2. "Donkey Island" – 2:57
3. "Dawnsio Dros Y Mor" – 1:59
4. "Slip Slip Way" – 0:49
5. "Costa Rita" – 4:12
6. "Stella Is a Pigmy #1" – 0:30
7. "My Country Girl" – 1:43
8. "Circus Time" – 4:25
9. "Cynhaeaf" – 1:00
10. "Hi Mewn Socasau" – 3:27
11. "Stella Is a Pigmy #2" – 0:27
12. "Surf Rage" – 2:39
13. "First Time I Saw You" – 8:06
14. "Stella Is a Pigmy #3" – 0:24
