= Land of Nod (disambiguation) =

The Land of Nod is a location mentioned in the Bible to where Cain was exiled. It may also refer to:

- Another word for sleep
- The Land of Nod (company), a catalog, web, and retail store company
- The Land of Nod (book), Hugo Award-nominated novelette by Mike Resnick
- Land of Nod country estate in Headley Down, Hampshire, England, seat of the Whitaker family
- "Land of Nod", an episode of the TV series Powers
- a poem from A Child's Garden of Verses by Robert Louis Stevenson

== Music ==
- The Land of Nod (band), a British post-rock band
- "Land of Nod", a song by British electronic music trio Is Tropical on their debut album Native To
