= Dyma'r Dystiolaeth =

Studio album by Tystion
- Released: 1995
- Genre: Hip hop
- Label: Fitamin Un

Tystion chronology
Dyma'r Dystiolaeth (1995)	Tystion vs Allfa Un (1996)

Dyma'r Dystiolaeth is the debut album by the Welsh hip-hop band Tystion, released on Fit! 001, cassette. It was released in 1995.

== Track listing ==
1. Y Bardd A'r Brawd
2. Jeremeia
3. (Rhaid Eu) Tynnu I Lawr
4. Fitamin Cetamin
5. Gair O'r Stryd
6. Mewn Amser...
7. Pump I Bedwar
8. Cariadon Fori
9. Jazzmental
10. Mae'r Frwydr Yn Parhau

== See also ==
- Music of Wales
