= Laugharne Weekend =

Welsh literary and arts festival

The Laugharne Weekend Festival
- Genre: Literary festival
- Locations: Laugharne, Wales
- Years active: 2007-present
- Website: http://thelaugharneweekend.com/

The Laugharne Weekend is an annual literary and arts festival in Laugharne, Wales, held in the spring. Dylan Thomas described Laugharne as a timeless, mild, beguiling island of a town.

The festival is deliberately small-scale. The size of the town ensures that the festival will not grow beyond certain bounds. Its location means that festival visitors and townspeople rub shoulders with the artists and performers. According to the festival's co-founders, Richard Thomas and the Cardiff writer John Williams, it is a festival that involves the locality. and that they would sooner start another festival rather than let it grow too big.

The Laugharne Weekend concentrates on literature and music, drawing largely from writers and musicians from Wales or who have a connection with Wales. Previous headline performers have included Patti Smith, Ray Davies of the Kinks, Mick Jones of The Clash, the actor Michael Sheen, the writer Caitlin Moran, the poet John Cooper Clarke, the comedians Harry Hill and Alexei Sayle, and the painter Peter Blake.

All events take place in Laugharne's clubs, churches and halls—tiny and intimate venues which entail the close proximity of audience and performers. The principal venues used are the Millennium Hall, the Congregational Church and the Rugby Club

The Laugharne Weekend's music director is Richard James, formerly of the Welsh band Gorky's Zygotic Mynci.
