= Son of Euro Child =

Studio album by Euros Childs
- Released: September 7, 2009
- Label: National Elf

Euros Childs chronology
Cheer Gone (2008)	Son of Euro Child (2009)	Face Dripping (2010)

Professional ratings
Review scores
Source	Rating
BBC Music	(?)
The Guardian	4/5 stars

Son of Euro Child is an album by Euros Childs, released in September 2009. It is his fifth solo album. It is available as a free download from Childs' official website.

== Track listing ==
1. "Shithausen"
2. "Gently All Around"
3. "Like This? Then Try This"
4. "How Do You Do"
5. "Rat-Clock"
6. "Look At My Boots"
7. "1,000 Pictures Of You"
8. "Carrboro"
9. "My Baby Joy"
10. "The Dog"
11. "Harp i a ii ar #1"
12. "The Fairy Feller's Masterstroke"
13. "Harp i a ii ar #2"
14. "Mother Kitchen"
15. "Son of Shithausen"
