= Tystion vs Allfa Un =

EP by Tystion
- Released: 1996
- Genre: Punk
- Labels: Fitamin Un; Cassette-only release: Fit! 002

Tystion chronology
Dyma'r Dystiolaeth (1995)	Tystion vs Allfa Un (1996)	Rhaid I Rhywbeth Ddigwydd (1997)

Tystion vs Allfa Un is a 1996 cassette and the second release by the Welsh band Tystion.

== Track listing ==
1. Dan Y Belt
2. Isymwybod

== See also ==
- Music of Wales
