= Spanish Dance Troupe =

Studio album by Gorky's Zygotic Mynci
- Released: 4 October 1999
- Recorded: September 1998 – May 1999
- Genre: Indie rock, psychedelic folk
- Length: 37:20
- Label: Mantra
- Producer: Gorwel Owen, Gorky's Zygotic Mynci

Gorky's Zygotic Mynci chronology
Gorky 5 (1998)	Spanish Dance Troupe (1999)	The Blue Trees (2000)

Professional ratings
Review scores
Source	Rating
AllMusic	4.5/5 stars
Alternative Press	4/5
The Guardian	4/5 stars
NME	8/10
Pitchfork	7.0/10
The Rolling Stone Album Guide	3/5 stars

Spanish Dance Troupe is the sixth album by Welsh psychedelic folk band Gorky's Zygotic Mynci, released on 4 October 1999. The album was recorded at Stiwdio Ofn in Llanfaelog, Anglesey and mastered by Chris Blair at Abbey Road Studios. The album was the last to feature founder member John Lawrence, who had departed the band by the time the album was released.

The title track was covered by Of Montreal and appeared as a bonus track on their 2004 album Satanic Panic in the Attic.

== Track listing ==
All songs by Euros Childs unless otherwise stated.

1. "Hallway"
2. "Poodle Rockin'"
3. "She Lives on a Mountain"
4. "Drws" (James)
5. "Over & Out" (E. Childs, James)
6. "Don't You Worry" (M. Childs)
7. "Faraway Eyes" (E. Childs, James)
8. "The Fool" (James)
9. "Hair Like Monkey Teeth Like Dog"
10. "Spanish Dance Troupe"
11. "Desolation Blues"
12. "Murder Ballad"
13. "Freckles"
14. "Christmas Eve"
15. "The Humming Song"

== Personnel ==
- Euros Childs - vocals, piano, organ
- John Lawrence - guitar, vocals
- Richard James - bass, guitar, vocals
- Euros Rowlands - drums, percussion
- Megan Childs - violin, vocals
- Gorwel Owen - Piano
- Edwyn Humphreis - Woodwind
- Euros Wyn - Woodwind
- Tony Robinson - Brass
- Oscar Owen - Vocals
- Alfreda Benge - Sleeve art
