= Sleep/Holiday =

Studio album by Gorky's Zygotic Mynci
- Released: 2003
- Length: 51:21

Gorky's Zygotic Mynci chronology
How I Long to Feel That Summer in My Heart (2001)	Sleep/Holiday (2003)

Professional ratings
Aggregate scores
Source	Rating
Metacritic	73/100
Review scores
Source	Rating
AllMusic	3.5/5 stars
Pitchfork Media	6.8/10

Sleep/Holiday is the last album by Gorky's Zygotic Mynci, released in 2003.

== Track listing ==
1. "Waking for Winter" – 3:26
2. "Happiness" – 3:21
3. "Mow the Lawn" – 3:06
4. "Single to Fairwater" – 4:59
5. "Shore Light" – 3:32
6. "Country" – 1:46
7. "Eyes of Green, Green, Green" – 3:24
8. "The South of France" – 2:51
9. "Leave My Dreaming" – 4:08
10. "Only Takes a Night" – 6:36
11. "Pretty as a Bee" – 9:28
12. "Red Rocks" – 4:44
