= The Miracle Inn =

Studio album by Euros Childs
- Released: 27 August 2007
- Label: Wichita Recordings

Euros Childs chronology
Bore Da (2007)	The Miracle Inn (2007)	Cheer Gone (2008)

Professional ratings
Review scores
Source	Rating
Pitchfork Media	(6.2/10) 8/30/07
The Times	link

The Miracle Inn is an album by Euros Childs, released in August 2007. It was his third solo album. It features a cover of The Turtles' "Think I'll Run Away".

== Track listing ==
All tracks written by Euros Childs except where noted.

1. "Over You"
2. "Horse Riding"
3. "Ali Day"
4. "Think I'll Run Away" (Howard Kaylan, Mark Volman)
5. "Outside My Window"
6. "Hard Times Wondering"
7. "Miracle Inn"
8. "Go Back Soon"
