= Ectogram =

Welsh band

- Origin: Bangor, Wales
- Genres: Experimental rock; psychedelic rock; post-rock; space rock
- Years active: 1993–2015
- Labels: Ankstmusik; Pure Pop For Now People; Klangbad; Ochre; Ankst; Atol
- Members: Ann Matthews; Maeyc Hewitt; Alan Holmes
- Website: ectogram.co.uk myspace.com/ectogram

Ectogram were a Welsh band from Bangor, Wales.

Ann Matthews and Alan Holmes were previously members of Welsh language post-punk band Fflaps between 1987 and 1993, touring Europe, releasing three LPs, and recording two John Peel Sessions during that time. When the band's drummer Jonny Evans left in 1993, they recruited old friend Maeyc Hewitt and morphed into the quite different sounding Ectogram.

The band initially recorded two singles for the small Welsh independent label, Atol, before being signed to the more well-known Ankst label, for whom they recorded an album and two EPs. When that label dissolved in 1998, Ectogram stayed with Ankstmusik, the label set up by one of the former Ankst partners.

Their music combines conventional rock elements such as repetitive rhythms and vocal melody with atonal discord and improvisation. Their style has been influenced by bands such as Sonic Youth, Faust, Pere Ubu, My Bloody Valentine and Acid Mothers Temple. BBC Radio Wales DJ, Adam Walton described their guitar style as 'Egoless textures and exploratory sonics.'

All three members of Ectogram were also members of the experimental rock supergroup The Serpents, who released an album on the Ochre label in 1999.

During 2005, Ectogram played a series of gigs with krautrock group Faust, at times joining them on stage for a collaborative performance, and in 2012 they acted as a backing band for a performance by ex – Can member Damo Suzuki.

In late 2015, Gigwise listed Ectogram as one of their 27 Greatest Welsh Bands Of All Time.

Drummer Maeyc Hewitt died of cancer 2 October 2015 and the band's website suggested that this was possibly the end of Ectogram as a band.

== Discography ==
=== Studio albums ===
- 1996 I Can't Believe it's not Reggae! – (Ankst)
- 2000 All Behind the Witchtower – (Ankstmusik)
- 2002 Tall Things Falling – (Ankstmusik)
- 2005 Electric Deckchair – (Ankstmusik)
- 2006 Concentric Neckwear – (Pure Pop For Now People)
- 2007 Fluff on a Faraway Hill – (Klangbad)
- 2012 Exo-Celestial – (Turquoise Coal)

=== Singles and EPs ===
- 1994 Spio Trwy Tylla – (Atol)
- 1995 Mary – (Atol)
- 1995 Spoonicon EP – (Ankst)
- 1997 Eliot's Violet Hour – (Ankst)
- 1998 Spitsbergen – (Ochre)
- 1999 Evanescence – (Ochre)
- 2006 Y Lleill EP – (Ankstmusik)

=== Split Releases ===
- 1998 Stolen Ecstasy – (with Flowchart) (100 Guitar Mania)
- 1998 Spitsbergen Part 4 – (with The Land of Nod) (Ochre)
- 2001 Füxa vs. Ectogram – (with Füxa) (Ochre)
- 2007 Split CD – (with Klaus Kinski) (Giant Hammer)

=== Compilation Appearances ===
- 1995 S4C Makes Me Want to Smoke Crack – (Atol)
- 1995 Triskadekaphilia – (Ankst)
- 1996 Plan Boom – (What's That Noise)
- 1997 Angels With Big Wings – (Ankst)
- 1999 Floralia Vol 3 – (Wot 4)
- 1999 Croeso 99 – (Ankstmusik)
- 1999 Through the Square Window – (Blue Flea)
- 2000 Yr Agog – (Oggum)
- 2001 The Stooges – (Snowdonia)
- 2003 Radio Crymi Playlist Vol. 1 (1988-1998) – (Ankstmusik)
- 2007 Nødutgang 2007 – (Go To Gate)
- 2007 Klangbad Festival 2007 – (Klangbad)
- 2008 Radio Crymi Playlist Vol. 2 (1998-2008) – (Ankstmusik)
- 2008 Mind Expansion Compilation 2 – (Mind Expansion)
- 2009 Andy – (Pure Pop For Now People)
- 2009 50 And Up – (Barbelo)
- 2011 Past - Present - Future – (Pure Pop For Now People)

=== Film ===
- Ectogram recorded the soundtrack for Emyr Glyn Williams's feature film Y Lleill, which won the Bafta for best film at the 2004 Bafta Wales awards. The film was also shown at the ICA.
