= Parking Non-Stop =

- Parking Non-Stop logo

Background information
- Origin: Anglesey, Wales
- Genres: Experimental rock, post-rock, pop
- Years active: 1999–present
- Labels: Klangbad, Pure Pop For Now People and Ochre Records
- Members: Zoë Skoulding; Dewi Evans; Alan Holmes.
- Website: web.archive.org/web/20061019030410/http://www.parkingnonstop.com/

Parking Non-Stop (sometimes abbreviated to PN-S) is a north Wales based psychogeographical musical/artistic collective who experiment in combining soundscape and field recordings with spoken word and music. The group consist of the poet Zoë Skoulding and musicians Alan Holmes and Dewi Evans, often in collaboration with additional musicians and artists.

== Biography ==
Since 1999 Zoë Skoulding, Alan Holmes and Dewi Evans have built up a body of work that explores the sonic geography of a wider Europe within the context of north Wales, where they live. The main focus of this work is a series of musical pieces that integrate field recordings they have made in various European locations with recordings made in their own home studios. These pieces generally combine an experimental soundscape approach with an aesthetic that encompasses both Europop and industrial minimalism.

Their stated aim is "to achieve a distinctive north Wales sound that is based in discovering new spatial and temporal resonances: this is not a musical identity built from a mythical past, but an engagement with the sonic possibilities of the mines, quarries and rusting machinery in the landscape as it is today - a decaying rural-industrial environment rich with unexpected noise."

Although conceived primarily as a recording project, Parking Non-Stop have played live several times during their lifetime, often in collaboration with like-minded musicians, poets and artists. Performances to date have taken place in several European countries, including Wales, England, Ireland, Slovakia, Bosnia, Germany, Czech Republic, Norway, Romania and France.

In addition to producing music and sound collage, Parking Non-Stop also make films, which are used as projections during their live performances. These films tend to be very slow moving and uneventful in order to enhance, rather than detract from the sound. Some examples can be viewed on the group's YouTube channel (see external link below).

In 2004, Parking Non-Stop were personally invited to support German post-industrial group Einstürzende Neubauten at their first Dublin concert. Soon afterwards, the group came to the attention of Faust's Hans Joachim Irmler, who invited them to perform at his Klangbad Festival in Scheer, southern Germany in 2007. The following year, Irmler released the group's debut album "Species Corridor" on his Klangbad label. The album was well received and drew positive reviews from the music press.

Interest from Germany continued with the group being invited to play a short tour there in 2009 and subsequently being invited to record a split LP for the Frankfurt-based Pure Pop For Now People label, which was released in 2010. The group also contributed rare tracks to two compilation CDs on the label.

== Musical style ==
Parking Non-Stop's musical style covers a wide range, at various times taking in straight forward melodic pop, harsh industrial noise, ethereal ambience, musique concrete, progressive rock, krautrock and rhythmic electronica. Skoulding plays bass guitar in addition to providing vocals (sung, spoken and electronically treated), while Evans provides a variety of keyboard sounds, with Holmes playing electric guitar and sequencing and mixing rhythms and field recordings. All three members provide location recordings, with many of the percussion sounds on "Species Corridor" being derived from recordings of slate captured in their local derelict quarries. This attempt to capture the sound of their local environment results in what the group have called a "rural industrial" sound. The three members had previously worked together with Welsh singer Rheinallt H Rowlands and hints of Evans' orchestral arrangements for that artist are also at times evident in Parking Non-Stop. They have been compared by various commentators to artists such as Stereolab, Einstürzende Neubauten, Kraftwerk, Broadcast, Throbbing Gristle, The KLF, Matthew Herbert and Tatu.

== Discography ==
- Species Corridor 2008 (Klangbad - CD)
- Cold Star 2010 (split LP with Temple of the Beeheads, Pure Pop For Now People - LP)

=== Compilations ===
- Infrasonic Waves 2001 (Ochre Records - CD)
- Klangbad Festival 2007 2007 (Klangbad - CD)
- The Incredible Sound Show 2010 (Pure Pop For Now People - CD)
- Past Present Future 2011 (Pure Pop For Now People - CD)
