= John Williams (author, born 1961) =

Welsh writer

- Born: John Lincoln Williams; 12 May 1961 (age 64); Cardiff, Wales
- Other names: John Lincoln; John L. Williams
- Occupation: Writer
- Notable work: The Cardiff Trilogy (1999–2003)

John Lincoln Williams (born 12 May 1961) is a Welsh writer who has published as John Williams, John L. Williams, and John Lincoln.

== Early life ==
Williams was born in Cardiff, where he currently lives, and grew up in a middle-class neighbourhood. In his teens, he joined the punk scene and moved to Camden Town to live in a squat and play in bands. After discovering the works of Elmore Leonard he began writing book reviews for NME and The Sunday Times.

== Career ==
In 1994, Williams published Into the Badlands (1991), a combination of travelogue and interviews with American crime fiction authors, including Elmore Leonard, James Ellroy, Carl Hiaasen, and Sara Paretsky. This was followed in 1994 by Bloody Valentine, a nonfiction account of the killing of sex worker Lynette White in the inner-city district of Butetown.

Five Pubs, Two Bars and a Nightclub (1999), a collection of short stories, was his fiction debut. It became the first volume in the so-called 'Cardiff Trilogy', which includes the novels Cardiff Dead (2000) and The Prince of Wales (2003). He has also written biographies of the singer and Butetown native Dame Shirley Bassey and the Trinidadian Black Power activist Michael X and the Trinidadian historian and writer C.L.R. James.

He writes crime fiction under the name "John Lincoln",

Williams currently writes for The Mail on Sunday and The Independent and is co-organiser of the Laugharne Festival.

== Selected works ==
=== Non-fiction ===
- Into the Badlands (Paladin, 1991)
- Bloody Valentine (HarperCollins, 1994)
- Michael X: a Life in Black and White (Century, 2008)
- Miss Shirley Bassey (Quercus, 2010)
- Bloody Valentine (Updated Edition) (Oldcastle Books, 2021)
- C.L.R. James: A Life Beyond the Boundaries (Constable, 2022).
- Heatwave (2025)

=== Fiction ===
- Faithless (1997)
- Five Pubs, Two Bars and a Nightclub (Bloomsbury, 1999)
- Cardiff Dead (Bloomsbury, 2000)
- The Prince of Wales (Bloomsbury 2003)
- Temperance Town (Bloomsbury, 2004)
- The Cardiff Trilogy (Bloomsbury, 2006) (an omnibus volume collecting Five Pubs, Two Bars and a Nightclub; Cardiff Dead; and The Prince of Wales)
- Fade to Grey (No Exit Press, 2019) (under "John Lincoln")
