= Steffan Cravos =

Welsh rapper, musician and artist

Steffan Cravos / Lambchop
- Also known as: Lambchop
- Born: Steffan Cravos; 1975 (age 50–51)
- Origin: Cardiff, Wales
- Genres: Rap, hip hop
- Occupations: DJ, musician, artist
- Instruments: Turntables; violin
- Years active: 1991–present
- Label: Fitamin Un
- Formerly of: Tystion

Steffan Cravos (born 1975, in Cardiff) is a Welsh rap and hip hop musician and artist.

As "DJ Lambchop", Cravos is known for his "rub and scratch" turntablist style. He is also the founding member of Tystion, a Welsh hip hop band.

He was briefly involved with an early line-up of Gorky's Zygotic Mynci playing violin and sound effects, and is credited on several songs on their early-years compilation Patio.

== Projects ==
=== Fitamin Un ===
In 1996, Cravos set up his own record label, Recordiau Fitamin Un. Fed up with the scene in Wales, he created it to be an outlet for some of his projects (like Tystion) and other underground material. Other bands released on the label include Llwybr Llaethog, "Pep Le Pew", "Trawsfynydd Lo-Fi Liberation Front", and "Continuous Sound Labordy Swn Cont". All of Fitamin Un's releases have been archived by The National Screen and Sound Archive of Wales at The National Library of Wales.

=== Radio Amgen ===
Radio Amgen provides a range of MP3 recordings to listen to on the computer. The tracks feature artists working in both Welsh and English languages. The site also includes links to artists, labels, other MP3 resources, and related institutions. Radio Amgen, whose name translates as Alternative Radio, also provided a platform for amateur DJs and music producers to present their works. Programmes broadcast through the station included Dander Radio, produced by Aron Jones.

=== Tystion (1991–2002) ===
Tystion began in 1991. Cravos, aged 16, and influenced by the sounds of Public Enemy and Dead Kennedys, worked from his bedroom in Carmarthen using two tape decks and a mixer. He wanted to create an answer to the current state of the Welsh musical mainstream. By 1995, he was joined by Gruff Meredith.

=== Lo-Cut and Sleifar ===
Cravos worked on this project with Murry the Hump member/producer Lo-Cut (Curig Huws) and put out an album in 2004 on Boobytrap Records. They were based in Cardiff and established their partnership in Paris.

"Music for the feet and music for the mind" — their definition of hip-hop - is the English translation of the title.

=== Discography ===
==== Albums ====
Year	Album	Label	Additional information
2004	Miwsig I'ch Traed A Miwsig I'ch Meddwl	Boobytrap Records	

== Welsh language ==
In April 2005 Cravos became president and chairman of Cymdeithas yr Iaith (Welsh Language Society), having been involved with the society and its activities since the 1990s.

== See also ==
- Music of Wales

== Projects ==
- Brechdan Tywod (in Welsh)
- DJ Lambchop
- Lo-cut and Sleifer
- Radio Amgen (in Welsh)
- Tystion
- Tystion page (with lyrics)

== MP3s ==
- Sleifar a'r Teulu, Sesiwn Radio 1 (in Welsh)

== Welsh-language rap ==
- On Rapping in Welsh
- Rappers take on the Bards
