= Cheer Gone =

Studio album by Euros Childs
- Released: 27 October 2008
- Label: Wichita Recordings
- Producer: Mark Nevers

Euros Childs chronology
The Miracle Inn (2007)	Cheer Gone (2008)	Son of Euro Child (2009)

Professional ratings
Review scores
Source	Rating
The Times	3/5 stars

Cheer Gone is the fourth solo album by Euros Childs, released on 27 October 2008 for Wichita Recordings.

== Track listing ==
All tracks written by Euros Childs.

1. "Autumn Leaves"
2. "Summer Days"
3. "Her Ways"
4. "Nineteen Fifties"
5. "My Love is Gone"
6. "Always Thinking Of Her"
7. "Farm-hand Murder"
8. "Saving Up To Get Married"
9. "O Ein Daear"
10. "Medicine Head"
11. "Sing Song Song"
