= Situation Comedy (album) =

Studio album by Euros Childs
- Released: October 21, 2013
- Genre: Alternative rock
- Label: National Elf

Euros Childs chronology
Summer Special (2012)	Situation Comedy (2013)	Eilaaig (2014)

Professional ratings
Review scores
Source	Rating
AllMusic	3.5/5 stars
The Guardian	3/5 stars

Situation Comedy is an album by Euros Childs, released in October 2013. It is his ninth solo album, released by his record label National Elf Records.

== Track listing ==
1. "Tête À Tête" – 2:52
2. "Second Home Blues" – 2:22
3. "Avon Lady" – 2:57
4. "Ooh La Oona" – 3:41
5. "Brides in the Bath" – 2:23 y
6. "Give the Girl a Hand / The Peanut Vendor" – 2:20
7. "Holiday from Myself" – 4:40
8. "Tina Said" – 3:19
9. "Daddy's Girl" – 4:24
10. "Good Time Baby (Talk to Me)" – 4:55
11. "Trick of the Mind" – 13:40

== Personnel ==
- Euros Childs – lead vocals, piano, synthesizer
- Stephen Black – bass, clarinet, saxophone
- Stuart Kidd – drums
- Marco Rea – electric guitar
- Laura J Martin – flute
