= Bore Da =

Studio album by Euros Childs
- Released: 5 March 2007
- Label: Wichita Recordings

Euros Childs chronology
Chops (2006)	Bore Da (2007)	The Miracle Inn (2007)

Professional ratings
Review scores
Source	Rating
NME	link

Bore Da is an album by Euros Childs, released in March 2007. It was his second solo album and is sung entirely in Welsh. "Bore Da" is Welsh for "good morning".

== Tracks ==
All tracks written by Euros Childs except where noted.

1. "Bore Da"
2. "Siwgr Siwgr Siwgr"
3. "Henry a Matilda Supermarketsuper"
4. "Ar Lan y Môr" (Euros Childs/Lynn Smith)
5. "Twll Yn Yr Awyr"
6. "Dechrau'r Diwedd"
7. "Cwtsh"
8. "Blaidd Tu Fas Y Drws"
9. "Warrior" (Euros Childs/Meilyr Jones/Peter Richardson)
10. "Sandalau"
11. "Roedd Hi'n Nofio Yn Y Bore Bach"
12. "Aur Yr Haul"
