= Adam Walton (DJ) =

British radio disc jockey (born 1971)

Adam Thomas Walton
- Born: 31 May 1971 (age 55); Davenham, Cheshire, England, UK
- Education: Liverpool University
- Years active: 1990–present
- Known for: The Immediate (band) (1993–1996); BBC Radio Wales DJ (1994–present); Author (2016–present)
- Children: 1

Adam Walton (born 31 May 1971) is a British radio disc jockey who has presented shows on BBC Radio Wales since 1993. He is also a member of Mold-based, indie band The Immediate, and a resident DJ at Telford's Warehouse in Chester. Adam has also written a book On Making Music.

== Early life and career ==
Walton was born in Davenham, Cheshire. His family moved to Nannerch, Wales where he was brought up. He studied English at Liverpool University gaining a degree and formed a band in 1990 to 'avoid working.' In June 1991 Adam began presenting a series of seven 30 minute radio shows called Burst on the now defunct station, BBC Radio Clwyd. Wanting to focus on his band, Walton didn't do any further radio work for 3 years. His band (originally called Daisychain) released a cassette EP called Maelstrom. They changed their name to Metroland before settling on The Immediate, who released a CD EP Stay Young in 1995.

== BBC Radio Wales ==
Walton began presenting a show on BBC Radio Wales called Revolution in October 1994. It was broadcast on week nights from the BBC studios in Mold and several artistes appeared in session on the show including Frank Black, Julian Cope, Ride, Throwing Muses, Catatonia and Melys. The show ran with this format until 1998.

The show was relaunched as The Musical Mystery Tour and schedule changes moved its one-hour format, 4 nights a week to a Sunday night. In 2007, Adam decided to dedicate the show entirely to new Welsh music, a format he still employs today. On 7 January 2011 the show moved to Saturday nights (10pm – 1am) With a dedication to Welsh artists, the show hosted weekly pre-recorded sessions for countless underground acts, and Adam was/is often lauded as a champion of such music. Budget constraints have prevented regular sessions since 2012 and despite cuts and changes the show continues to promote Welsh music.

The show does occasionally organise events or broadcast from events, such as Focus Wales festival in Wrexham and Festival N°6.

In May and June 2005, Adam hosted a show called Walton's Records, a music quiz programme broadcast from various 'venues' in Wales. The format had two teams, captained by Andrea Lewis (of indie band The Darling Buds) and Hue Williams (of indie band The Pooh Sticks).

Adam Walton also presented a Saturday morning show called Science Cafe on BBC Radio Wales, featuring and interviewing people from the world of science, such as British astronaut Tim Peake. He was also behind a tech show on the station called Mousemat (2013).

From 2017 until 2021, Adam Walton occasionally stood in for Janice Long on her BBC Radio Wales weekday evening show, as well as being the show's producer, and presented a three-hour tribute to Long following her death in December 2021.

== Whipcord Records and other work ==
In 1998 Adam launched Whipcord Records and released 7" singles by Out and Big Leaves. He resurrected the label in 2016 as an outlet for his own material. He is also a resident DJ at Telford's Warehouse, Chester, the venue hosts regular bands, which Adam occasionally gets involved with promoting them; notably Coldplay before they were famous.

== Written work ==
In the late 1990s and into the 2000s, Adam contributed a weekly column to the newspaper Daily Post called Ear Buzz that covered local music topics of the day. The column was later relaunched from a more 'personal life' point of view before fizzling out. He also hosted his own website covering reviews, show playlists and information (c2010).

2014 saw the launch of Adam's book On Making Music, a guide for bands and artistes on how to make music and how get it out into the public domain. As Adam said, "It saddens me that music-makers in 2014 are making the exact same mistakes I was making in 1994, and this is my attempt to offer advice that will help them to avoid those pitfalls, and also to inspire them."

== The Immediate ==
Having split up in 1996, The Immediate reformed in 2016 and began playing a few gigs in Chester and North Wales. They released two albums Manbouy (16 June 2017) then More Sheep Than Humans. Adam has represented the band in session on local radio. Walton also uses the band's name for his solo projects.
