= Telford's Warehouse =

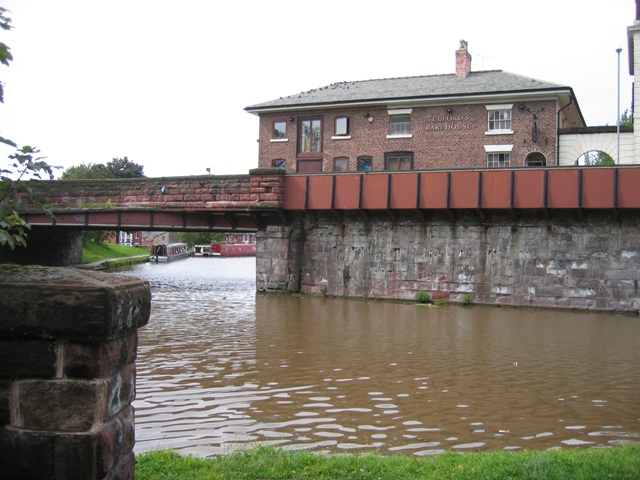
- Telford's Warehouse

- Location in Cheshire
- 53.1933°N 2.8987°W
- Location: Raymond Street, Chester, Cheshire, England
- OS grid reference: SJ 401 666

History
- Built: c. 1790
- Built for: Shropshire Union Canal

Site notes
- Architect: Thomas Telford
- Restored: 2000s
- Restored by: James Brotherhood

Listed Building – Grade II
- Designated: 10 January 1972
- Reference no.: 1375919

Telford's Warehouse is a pub and music venue located between Raymond Street and Tower Wharf, Chester, Cheshire, England, alongside the Shropshire Union Canal. It is recorded in the National Heritage List for England as a designated Grade II listed building.

== History ==
The building was constructed in about 1790, and designed by Thomas Telford. Part of it is built over the canal to allow boats to be loaded or unloaded within the building. In the 1980s it was converted into a public house and restaurant under the direction of the local architect James Brotherhood. It was badly damaged by a fire in 2000, and has since been restored. It has sincs been converted into a public house and music venue.

== Architecture ==
It is built in brown brick with grey slate roofs. It is in two blocks, that facing Raymond Street having two storeys, and the block facing Tower Wharf with three storeys. In the smaller block the face overlooking the canal has two arches to allow for the entrance of boats for unloading. On the corresponding face of the larger block are loading bays in each floor, now converted into windows. The windows elsewhere are sashes.

== See also ==
- Grade II listed buildings in Chester (north and west)
