= Alan Holmes =

British musician

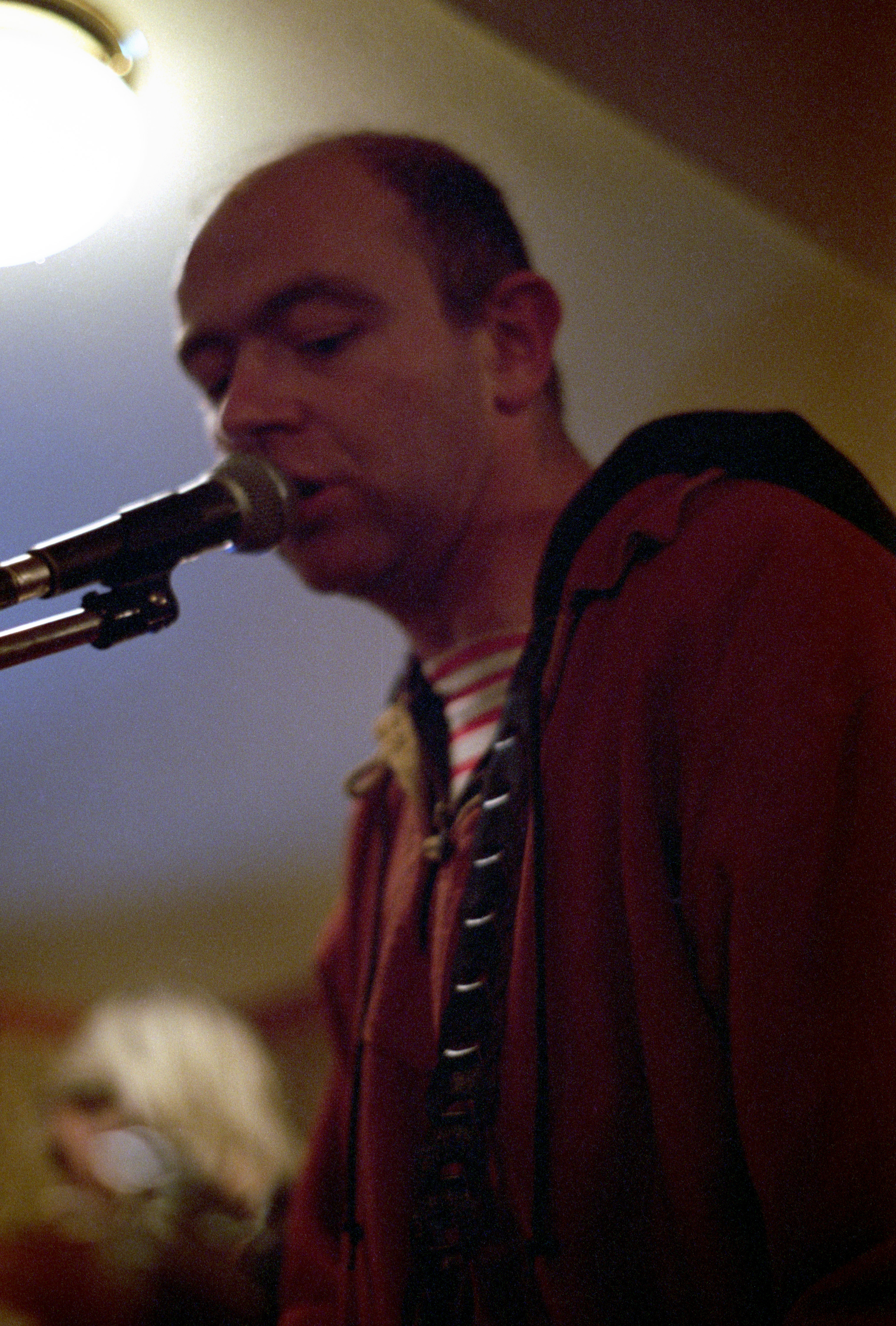
Picture of Alan Holmes

Alan Holmes is a musician and record producer, based in north Wales. Although he began his musical career in the late 1960s in childhood beat group the Insects, he first came to prominence in the Zuggs (in 1979), followed by A Silly Tree, the latter including Gary Stubbs, later of Cut Tunes with whom Holmes also served. Holmes was responsible for the cult psychedelic band the Pinecones. By the mid-1980s he was a key member of Reinheitsgebot, Third Spain and the Lungs.

Holmes' career came into its own as bass-player with the late-1980s Welsh language punk group Fflaps, who released two LPs for the Liverpool Probe Plus label and a third for the Central Slate label, in addition to touring Europe extensively between 1988 and 1992. After his bass amplifier blew up on stage, he moved to guitar and the group morphed into the more psychedelic/experimental Ectogram in 1993.

Holmes has worked as a session musician on several albums by Welsh artists including the debut album by Melys, and has produced several albums including the early releases of Gorky's Zygotic Mynci. He has also been responsible for much of the sleeve art of the Ankst label.

He continues to work with his own groups Parking Non-Stop and Spectralate in addition to making solo recordings as 'The Groceries'.
