= Tystion =

British hip-hop band

- Origin: Wales
- Genres: Hip hop
- Years active: 1996–2002
- Labels: Fitamin Un, Ankstmusik
- Past members: Steffan Cravos; Gruff Meredith; Curig Huws; Gareth Williams; Clancy Pegg

Tystion (English: Witnesses) was a Welsh language hip hop band from Carmarthenshire.

== Background ==
In 1996, MC Sleifar (Steffan Cravos) and G Man (Gruff Meredith) got together and released a few cassettes themselves. A year later they released the album Rhaid i Rhywbeth Ddigwydd (Something's Got to Happen), recorded with future Murry The Hump member Curig Huws, on their own Fitamin Un label. This caught the eye of Ankstmusik who then released their second album Shrug Off Ya Complex in 1999.

Meredith then left the band to become MC Mabon. Cravos was then joined by fellow rapper MC Chef (Gareth Williams) and Clancy Pegg on bass and keyboards. Their third album Hen Gelwydd Prydain Newydd (New Britain's Old Lie) was released in 2000 on Fitamin Un.

The band announced their split in August 2002. The announcement was made by Steffan Cravos from the stage of Maes B at the National Eisteddfod in St David's, at what was to be their last gig.

== Discography ==
=== Albums ===
Year	Album	Label	Additional information
1995	Dyma'r Dystiolaeth	Fitamin Un	Cassette-only release.
1996	Tystion vs Allfa Un	Fitamin Un	Cassette-only release.
1997	Rhaid I Rhywbeth Ddigwydd	Fitamin Un	Debut album
1999	Shrug Off Ya Complex	Ankstmusik	
2000	Hen Gelwydd Prydain Newydd	Ankstmusik	

=== Singles ===
Year	Song	Album	Label	Additional Information
1998	"Brewer Spinks EP"		Ankstmusik	Melody Maker's single of the week.
1999	"Shrug EP"	Shrug Off Ya Complex	Ankstmusik	12" Single
1999	"Toys EP"		Ankstmusik	12" Single
2001	"Y Meistri EP"		Fitamin Un	
2002	"M.O.M.Y.F.G EP"		Fitamin Un	final vinyl-only release. Review Video
