= The Blue Trees =

Studio album by Gorky's Zygotic Mynci
- Released: 30 October 2000
- Genre: Rock
- Length: 23:25
- Label: Mantra
- Producer: Gorwel Owen, Gorky's Zygotic Mynci

Gorky's Zygotic Mynci chronology
Spanish Dance Troupe (1999)	The Blue Trees (2000)	How I Long to Feel That Summer in My Heart (2001)

Professional ratings
Review scores
Source	Rating
AllMusic	4/5 stars
Wall of Sound	82/100

The Blue Trees is the seventh album by Welsh band Gorky's Zygotic Mynci, released on 30 October 2000.

== Track listing ==
1. "The Blue Trees" (Richard James)
2. "This Summer's Been Good from the Start'" (Euros Childs)
3. "Lady Fair" (Childs)
4. "Foot and Mouth '68" (Childs, James)
5. "Wrong Turnings" (James)
6. "Fresher Than the Sweetness in Water" (Ray Cane) (Honeybus cover)
7. "Face Like Summer" (Childs)
8. "Sbia Ar y Seren" (Childs)
