= The Land of Nod (band) =

English rock band

- Origin: Cheltenham, England
- Genres: Post-rock, space rock
- Years active: 1995–2005
- Labels: Ochre
- Members: Ant Walker; Dave Battersby

The Land of Nod are a space rock/post-rock duo from Cheltenham, England, comprising guitarist Ant Walker and bass guitarist Dave Battersby.

== History ==
The band formed in the mid 1990s, the members having previously been in the bands Elegant Chaos, Lucid Dream, and Reverb. Walker and Battersby were augmented by a drum machine, and specialized in space rock/post-rock guitar instrumentals. At times the duo were joined by others including David Wrench (synthesizer/piano/cello).

The band's first release was the track "Floating around in the bubblebuzz", which was released on the Voyage to the Cosmic Underworld: Volume One EP in 1995 on Ochre Records. The following year, they released two tracks on a split 12-inch EP with The Bass Cadets, and in January 1998 they released another split single with Ectogram. The band's first dedicated release was a four-track 10-inch EP in July 1998, which was followed in February 1999 by the debut album, Translucent. The band then released an album a year until 2003's Colli De Pedona. Their 2001 mini-set Mont Ventoux was themed on the Tour de France; The title track is a reference to one of the highest summits in the race, "Anquetil" was named after five times Tour winner Jacques Anquetil, and "Sommet" featured the voice of Eddy Merckx.

In March 2003, the band recorded a session for John Peel's BBC Radio 1 show. The band also recorded a session for the B-92 radio station in Yugoslavia, these tracks included on the US compilation Reality Channel. In the same year they contributed four exclusive tracks to the Seasons compilation album on Ochre Recordson which featured interpretations of the seasons of the year, with other tracks by Longstone, Lakescene (Walker's side-project), 90° South, and Stylus. The Land of Nod headlined the Cheltenham 'John Peel Night' in October 2005, which is the last time the band performed together.

Walker is also the leading figure in the band Pulsar.

== Musical style ==
The band's music is generally described as post-rock or space rock, but has also been described as shoegazing and "ambient instrumental rock". While the band have cited bands such as Echo & the Bunnymen (particularly Will Sergeant's guitar playing) as an influence, comparisons to Krautrock band such as Faust (band), Neu!, and Popol Vuh have been common. The band have also drawn comparisons with contemporary bands such as Godspeed You Black Emperor, Stars of the Lid, and Spiritualized.

== Discography ==
=== Albums ===
- Translucent (1999), Ochre
- Timeless Point (2000), Ochre
- Mont Ventoux (2001), Silber
- Inducing the Sleep Sphere (2002), Ochre
- Colli De Pedona (2003), Sillyboy

==== Compilations ====
- Archive:02 (2002), Ochre
- Reality Channel - Introduction To The Land Of Nod (2003), Elephant Stone

=== Singles ===
- Masaki EP (1998) Ochre
- "Chronicle Blueprint No. 2" (2000), Enraptured

=== Split releases ===
- Voyage to the Cosmic Underworld: Volume One 12-inch EP (1995), Ochre - "Floating Around in the Bubblebuzz"
- Bass cadets Vs. the Land of Nod split EP with the Bass Cadets (1996), Ochre - "Seeing into the Great Void", "Revoid"
- Split single with Ectogram (1998), Ochre - "Spiral"
- Land of Nod / P.A.T.E split 7-inch (2003), Ochre - "Eddy (remix)"

=== Compilations appearances ===
- HOPE (1998), Audio Research - "Escape Velocity"
- TRACE (1999), Audio Research - "C.O.B.E."
- ZERO (2000), Audio Research - "Drop"
- Through The Square Window (2000), Blue-Flea - "Bubblebuzz"
- 271199 (2000), Ochre - "Noose of Ice (live)"
- Interface (2000), Space Age Recordings - "Bubblebuzz"
- Ochre 7 (2001), Ochre - "Quadrant Zero (remix)"
- Songs For The End Of the World (2002), Silber - "Temporal"
- Audio Wonderland - Bedroom Ambience Volume 3 (2002), Enraptured
- Themes Volume One (2002), Ochre - "Timeless Point", "Quadrant Zero (out-take)" and "The Land Of Nod (Sunrise)"
- Seasons (2003), Ochre - "Waiting For The Thaw", "Summer House", "The Season Of Decay" and "Light Fades Fast"
- Ciclismo 3 (2006), Escalator - "Eddy"
