= John Lawrence (musician) =

Welsh musician

John Lawrence (born 17 July 1975) is a Welsh musician. He was a founding member of Gorky's Zygotic Mynci, but left the band in 1999, prior to the release of the band's sixth album Spanish Dance Troupe. As a solo artist, he has sometimes gone by the name Infinity Chimps.

In early 2011, Lawrence recorded a session for Adam Walton on BBC Introducing, backed by the then-new band Shy and the Fight.

In 2013, he released new material in collaboration with singer Jaci Williams. He has also been producing Tree of Wolves's material.

Lawrence produced folk musician Chris Jones's debut album, Dacw'r Tannau, released in September 2014. He has also worked with Band Pres Llareggub on their first EP, which was released in April 2015, and with Nia Morgan on her upcoming new album.

Lawrence released solo material, Songs from the Precipice, on 7 September 2015 via his website, followed by Narcissus Paradox in 2019. His style on later output has been likened to Frank Zappa. He makes occasional public appearances, including 9 Volt Sessions (twice, 4 September 2014 and 29 June 2015) and also a live session on Neil Crud's Tudno FM radio show on 20 June 2016.

== Discography ==
as John Lawrence

- Rainy Night, Lawrence Music, 2009
- Songs from the Precipice, Lawrence Music, 2015
- Narcissus Paradox, Lawrence Music, 2019

as Infinity Chimps

- Sounds of Nant Y Benglog, Ankstmusik / Lawrence Music, 2002
- Infinity Chimps, Sylem Records, 2000
