= David McGowan (rower) =

Australian rower and coach

Personal information
- Nationality: Australian
- Born: 27 April 1981 (age 44); Perth, Western Australia
- Education: Aquinas College, Perth

Sport
- Country: Australia
- Sport: Rowing
- Event(s): M4-, M8+

David McGowan (born 27 April 1981) is an Australian high-performance rowing coach and former representative rower. As a rower he was a junior world champion, competed twice at senior World Rowing Championships for Australia and raced at the Athens 2004 Summer Olympics in a coxless four. As a coach he has had head coaching roles in the national rowing programmes of The Netherlands and Ireland.

== Club and state rowing ==
McGowan contested three sweep events as a junior at the 1999 Australian Rowing Championships rowing for the Swan River Rowing Club. The following year he contested two U23 events. At the 2002 Australian Rowing Championships he raced for the open men's coxless four title in a WA composite crew and placed second.

McGowan was first selected to represent Western Australia in 1999 in the men's youth eight at the Interstate Regatta within the Australian Rowing Championships. In 2000 he again raced in the WA youth eight when they won the Noel Wilkinson Trophy at the Interstate Regatta.

In 2003 he was selected in the bow seat of the West Australian men's senior eight to contest the King's Cup at the Interstate Regatta. That WA crew was narrowly beaten by Victoria. In 2004 he again rowed in the West Australian King's Cup eight.

== International representative rowing ==
McGowan made his Australian representative debut in 1999 in a men's four which won the junior world title at the Junior World Rowing Championships in Plovdiv, Bulgaria setting what was then a world's best time at the junior level. The following year he was selected in an Australian four for the World Rowing U23 Championships held in Copenhagen. They rowed to a silver medal.

McGowan moved into the Australian senior squad in 2003. He rowed in the Australian men's eight at a World Rowing Cup and at the 2003 World Rowing Championships where they finished in fifth place. McGowan earned a seat in the Australian coxless four in 2005. They placed fourth at a World Rowing Cup in the Olympic lead-up and then at Athens 2004 they won their heat, placed second in their semi-final and finished in fourth place in the Olympic final.

McGowan came back into Australian representative contention in 2006. He was back in the bow seat of the Australian eight for the World Rowing Cup II at Poznan where the eight took gold but two months later at the 2006 World Rowing Championships at Eton Dorney he'd lost his seat to James Chapman. McGowan stroked the Australia coxless four at those championships to a fifteenth place finish. It was his last representative regatta as an oarsman.

== Coaching career ==
On his rowing retirement aged just 26, McGowan moved straight into coaching at the school level in Western Australia, including co-coaching PSA Rowing events. In 2007, prior to his departure for Europe, he and Gavin Russel co-coached the winning Trinity College crew in the 2007 WA schools Head of the River.

McGowan joined the Dutch rowing team in 2007, becoming the youngest coach to win a world championship when he took the Dutch men's lightweight eight to a gold medal win at the 2007 World Rowing Championships. In 2008, he took over the Dutch heavyweight men's eight and at the final Olympic qualification regatta managed to qualify them for the Beijing 2008. They made the Olympic final and finished in fourth place.

In 2013, McGowan moved to Sweden where he formed a recruitment and development program for elite athletes. The program was responsible for twelve world records on the concept2 rowing machine over a period of four years. While in Sweden, McGowan worked together with Chalmers University, co-writing papers relating to coach communication with athletes presenting at the 2015 icsport conference in Lisbon. In 2016 and 2017, McGowan lectured "creating a culture of excellence" at Innopolis University in Kazan, Russia.

In 2017 McGowan returned to Australia to a position as Head Coach at the Swan River Rowing Club.

In 2018, McGowan was appointed by Rowing Ireland as Head Coach of the heavyweight team. He took Aifric Keogh and Emily Hegarty to Ireland's first ever World Championship final appearance at the 2018 Worlds. He coached Sanita Pušpure to Ireland's first women's medal - World Championship gold in 2018 and 2019 as well as European Championship gold in 2019. He then coached the men's double scull of Philip Doyle and Ronan Byrne to a silver medal at the 2019 World Rowing Championships. The duo won Ireland's first heavyweight men's world championship medal in over 40 years.

== Accolades and career beyond rowing ==
In 2000, McGowan received the West Australian Youth of the Year award, and was nominated for Young Australian of the Year. He was an athlete representative for Australia at the 2005 IOC sessions in Olympia.

On 2 February 2021, McGowan was appointed as the Performance Manager of Swedish esports organisation Ninjas in Pyjamas.
