= Melys =

Welsh rock band

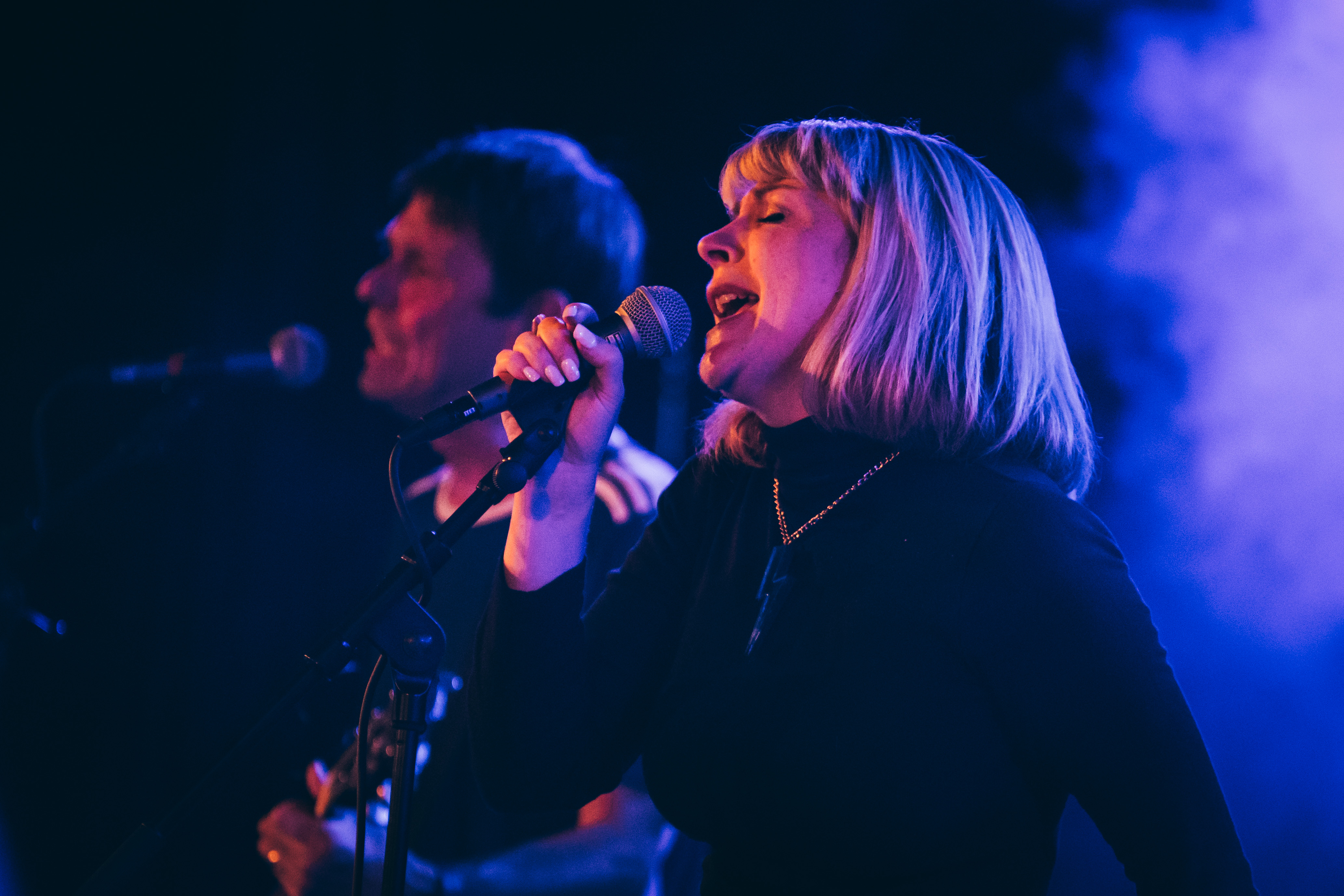
- Melys at Rockaway Beach in 2020

Background information
- Origin: Betws-y-Coed, Conwy, Wales
- Genres: Indie pop, indie rock
- Years active: 1996–2005, 2009, 2016–present
- Labels: Ankstmusik, Pinnacle, Sylem Records
- Members: Andrea Parker; Paul Adams; Gary Husband; Iwan Evans
- Past members: Carys Jones; Deian Elfryn; Richard Eardley; Geraint Jones; Aaron Watkinson; Stuart Hastings
- Website: melysmusic.com

Melys (Welsh for "Sweet") are a Welsh indie rock and indie pop band formed in Betws-y-Coed, Conwy, in 1996. The band perform in both English and Welsh.

Melys recorded eleven sessions for John Peel on BBC Radio 1, and their single "Chinese Whispers" topped Peel's Festive Fifty poll in 2001. In 2002 they won Best Welsh-language Act at the Welsh Music Awards.

== History ==
=== Formation and early releases (1996–1998) ===
Melys were formed in 1996 by vocalist Andrea Parker and guitarist/keyboard player Paul Adams after the pair met in Betws-y-Coed. Adams' brother Gary Husband joined on drums, alongside keyboard player Carys Jones.

The band released two EPs through the Welsh independent label Ankstmusik before signing to Pinnacle Records. Their debut album, Rumours and Curses, was released in 1998. Relations with Pinnacle deteriorated after the label went bankrupt later that year, leading the band to establish their own label, Sylem Records.

=== Sylem Records and Peel success (1999–2002) ===
Around this period, Carys Jones left the band and was replaced by bassist Richard Eardley.

Melys became closely associated with BBC Radio 1 DJ John Peel, recording eleven Peel Sessions during their career. Peel also introduced the band to the Dutch group Seedling, resulting in a 2001 split single release.

The band released their second album, Kamikaze, in 2000, followed by Suikerspin in 2001. The album included the single "Chinese Whispers", which was voted number one in John Peel's Festive Fifty poll for 2001.

=== Later releases and hiatus (2003–2009) ===
Melys returned in 2003 with their fourth album, Casting Pearls. Their final release before an extended hiatus was Life's Too Short in 2005, dedicated to John Peel following his death in 2004.

The band performed their final show of the period in Llandudno in March 2005 before taking a break from recording and touring. During the hiatus, Parker and Adams opened Bistro Betws-y-Coed, a restaurant specialising in Welsh cuisine.

In September 2009, Melys reunited for a performance marking "John Peel Day" at Hendre Hall in Bangor.

=== Reunion and recent activity (2016–present) ===
Melys resumed live performances in 2016, appearing at the By the Edge of the Sea festival in Brighton and the Stowed Out festival near Edinburgh. The band also toured with The Wedding Present later that year.

In 2017, Melys released an EP marking their twentieth anniversary.

In 2024, the band released BBC Sessions Volume 1, featuring recordings from sessions for John Peel, Adam Walton and Huw Stephens. They also toured extensively during 2024 and early 2025.

The single "Sgleinio" preceded the release of the band's fifth studio album, Second Wind, issued on Record Store Day on 12 April 2025.

In 2025, the band announced further UK tour dates, including shows supporting Huey Morgan of Fun Lovin' Criminals.

In 2026, Melys celebrated their 30th anniversary with a special performance at The Gate in Cardiff, accompanied by Cardiff's Vita String Quartet as well as performing a full electric set. Support was provided by Welsh band Gaff, while guest musicians included Peredur ap Gwynedd of Pendulum and Owen Powell of Catatonia.

The band also performed a homecoming concert at St Mary's Church in Betws-y-Coed, their first performance in their home town for 29 years.

Later in 2026, the band began writing and recording material for a seventh studio album.

== Musical style and language ==
Melys record material in both English and Welsh. At least one Welsh-language song has appeared on each of the band's studio albums. The group do not provide English translations for their Welsh-language lyrics in album packaging or on their website.

== Discography ==
=== Studio albums ===
- Rumours and Curses (1998)
- Kamikaze (2000)
- Suikerspin (2001)
- Casting Pearls (2003)
- Life's Too Short (2005)
- Second Wind (2025)

=== Live albums ===
- Borderlands Live (2020)
- BBC Sessions Volume 1 (2024)

=== EPs and singles ===
- Cysur (track included on S4C Makes Me Want to Smoke Crack Vol 2 Various Artists' EP) (Ankst 070, 1996)
- Fragile EP (Ankst 072, 1996)
- Cuckoo EP (Ankst 075, 1997)
- Diwifr EP (Arctic/Pinnacle FROST 104S, 1998)
- Lemming EP (Arctic/Pinnacle FROST 106S, 1998)
- Ambulance Chaser EP (Arctic/Pinnacle, 1998)
- Baby Tornado EP (Sylem CD1, 1999)
- Slagging Off Tourists EP (Sylem CD2, 1999)
- Un Darllenwr Lwcus EP (Sylem CD007, 2000)
- I Don't Believe in You 7-inch EP (Sylem 008, 2001, split single with Seedling)
- Chinese Whispers EP (Sylem 009 / Dream 17, 2001)
- So Good EP (Sylem CD011, 2002)
- Eyeliner EP (Sylem CD013, 2004)
