= Gorky's Zygotic Mynci =

Welsh psychedelic folk/alternative rock band (1991–2006)

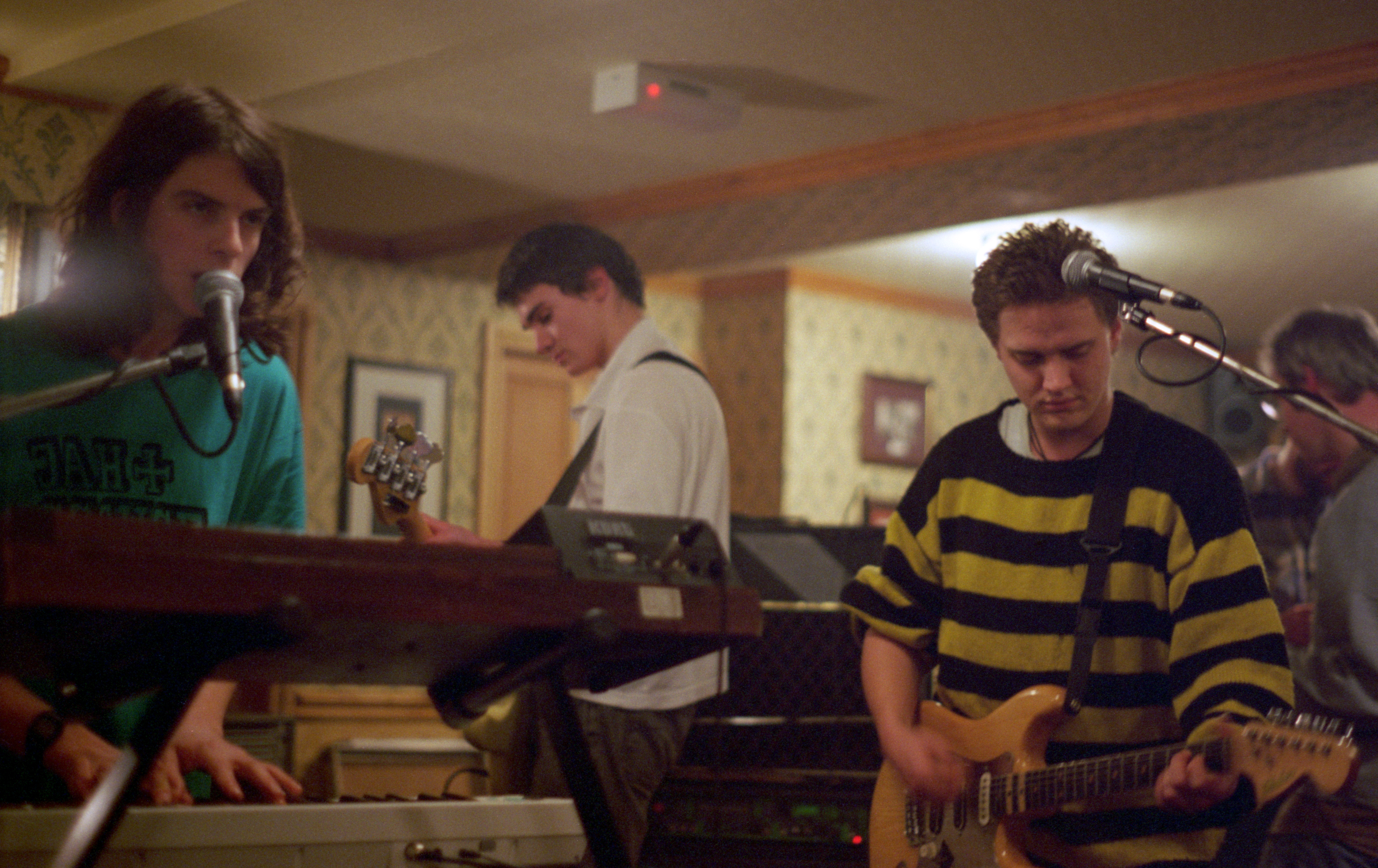
- Gorky's Zygotic Mynci performing in 1995

Background information
- Origin: Carmarthen, Wales
- Genres: Alternative rock; Britpop; folk rock; indie folk; indie pop; neo-psychedelia; psychedelic folk
- Years active: 1991–2006
- Labels: Ankst; Fontana; Mantra; Sanctuary
- Past members: Euros Childs; Richard James; John Lawrence; Megan Childs; Euros Rowlands; Steffan Cravos; Sion Lane; Cenwyn Brain; Sammy Davies; Osian Evans; Rhodri Puw; Peter Richardson; Damian Hern

Gorky's Zygotic Mynci (/ˈɡɔːkiz ˌzaɪˈɡɒtɪk ˈmʌŋki/) were a psychedelic folk and alternative rock band which formed in Carmarthen, Wales, in 1991. The group performed music in both Welsh and English, and they had eight Top 75 singles on the UK Singles Chart during their career. They were prominent during the era known as Cool Cymru. The group disbanded in May 2006.

== Biography ==
The group was formed by Euros Childs (vocals and keyboards), John Lawrence (vocals and guitar) and Richard James (bass guitar) whilst still at Bro Myrddin Welsh Comprehensive School in Carmarthen. Beyond their main roles in the band, all three were multi-instrumentalists and often swapped around instruments both in the studio and onstage. With Sion Lane (keyboards) and Steffan Cravos (violin) added to the lineup, Gorky's recorded the self-released cassette Allumette (1991). Sion and Steffan left shortly afterwards (the latter going on to form Welsh language rap group Tystion) and drummer Osian Evans was recruited for second cassette Peiriant Pleser (1992).

Euros Childs' sister Megan Childs (violin) subsequently joined the group and the band signed to the Welsh record label Ankst. The band's first release for the label was Patio (1993), a 10" collection of various live, home and studio recordings (this was later expanded for the 1995 CD version) which John Cale once proclaimed to be his 'favourite album ever'. Gorky's also released a number of singles and EPs on Ankst, demonstrating a taste for psychedelia and playfulness evidently inspired by the Canterbury scene of the 1960s and 1970s (Kevin Ayers' album Shooting at the Moon is cited in the notes to Tatay as "the best LP of all time", and the record also includes a version of Robert Wyatt's "O, Caroline"). The band began to be championed by BBC Radio 1 DJ John Peel (other than that, it was extremely rare to hear Welsh-language music on such a station).

In 1994 Gorky's released their first full studio album, Tatay. By 1995, Euros Rowlands had replaced Osian Evans on drums in time to record a second album – Bwyd Time – which featured a wide range of instrumentation (such as the parts for the celesta and sitar credited on "Iechyd Da"). Both albums were produced by Alan Holmes who also provided their colourful artwork. These early releases show a huge range of influences and styles: "Thema o Cartref", the opening track of Tatay, for example, is a relatively gentle harmonium-backed song, while "When You Hear the Captain Sing" appears to be a tribute of sorts to Captain Beefheart and "Amsermaemaiyndod/cinema" presents one song in the right channel and a completely different one in the left. The 1996 compilation Introducing Gorky's Zygotic Mynci (the band's first release in America) compiled material from the Ankst album and singles and summed up this phase of Gorky's career.

Now attracting the interest of larger record labels, Gorky's left Ankst and signed to Fontana Records. Their next album, Barafundle (1997), was produced by Gorwel Owen who had also worked with the Super Furry Animals. The wide-ranging instrumentation remained ("Diamond Dew" has a prominent part for the jaw harp) and there were still psychedelic touches, but the album as a whole was more laid back than their earlier work, tending more towards folk music. This gentler direction was largely maintained and refined in their later records, though the occasional poppier and rockier number, such as "Poodle Rockin'" from Spanish Dance Troupe or "Mow the Lawn" from Sleep/Holiday, continued to crop up.

Following their fifth album – 1998's appropriately-titled Gorky 5, which was released on Fontana's sister label Mercury Records – the band were dropped by Fontana. They quickly signed to Mantra Recordings (a division of the Beggars' Banquet label). In 1999, Gorky's released their first album for Mantra, Spanish Dance Troupe. This would be the last Gorky's album to feature input from founder member John Lawrence, who left the group during the recording sessions. Richard James took on Lawrence's former role of main guitarist, and Gorky's also recruited former Ffa Coffi Pawb member Rhodri Puw as a sideman to play guitar and bass guitar on tour. In 2000, Gorky's appeared with John Cale in a movie called Beautiful Mistake, in which they performed 1994 album track "O Caroline II". In the same year, the band released an acoustic mini-album called The Blue Trees in 2000, after which drummer Euros Rowlands left Gorky's to take up a career in teaching.

Rowlands was replaced by former Topper drummer Peter Richardson, and at around the same time Rhodri Puw was confirmed as being a full member of the band. This lineup of Gorky's recorded and toured two more albums – How I Long to Feel That Summer in My Heart (2001) and Sleep/Holiday (2003, on the Sanctuary Music label). The latter would prove to be the final Gorky's Zygotic Mynci album. Although Euros Childs and Richard James would spend time working on separate projects for a while, the band did not announce their formal split until May 2006.

In 2010 Richard James and Euros Childs performed at Dan Rebellato's wedding, with him later telling Lauren Laverne via Twitter, "We somehow got Gorky's Zygotic Mynci to reform and play our wedding last year, so it was wall-to-wall musical awesomeness". They've also collaborated on other short-term occasions, such as the online music video series "Outside My House" (2014). James and the Childs siblings also performed at the Charlotte Greig memorial concert in Cardiff in 2014.

Wales Online's David Owens called the band "one of the most original and unique bands in the history of Welsh music.”

== Origin of the band name ==
While in the band, Childs said that one of the most frequent questions he was asked was about the origin of the band's name. After struggling to come up with one, they decided "we might as well stick with the most ridiculous crap name we could think of."

Gorky's came from the word "gawky"; Lawrence says that "gork" was school slang for a dimwit.

Zygotic was "hijacked from GCSE biology"; it refers to the state of being like a zygote – a fertilized egg cell.

Mynci is a spelling of the word "monkey" using Welsh spelling rules, rather than a direct Welsh translation (the actual Welsh word is "mwnci") and is pronounced like "monkey".

== Discography ==
=== Albums ===
- Allumette (self-released), May 1991, cassette only
- Peirant Pleser (self-released), June 1992, cassette only
- Patio (Ankst, August 1993 as 10", expanded CD version in 1995)
- Tatay (Ankst, March 1994)
- Bwyd Time (Ankst, June 1995, UK No. 150)
- Barafundle (Fontana, April 1997, UK No. 46)
- Gorky 5 (Mercury Records, August 1998, UK No. 67)
- Spanish Dance Troupe (Mantra, November 1999, UK No. 88)
- The Blue Trees (Mantra, October 2000, UK No. 126)
- How I Long to Feel That Summer in My Heart (Mantra, September 2001, UK No. 76)
- Sleep/Holiday (Sanctuary, August 2003, UK No. 132)
- 20: Singles & EP's '94–'96 (2003)

=== Singles ===
The band have the distinction of being the only group with eight UK Top 75 singles without ever making the Top 40. They have, however, had singles peaking at 41, 42 and 43.

- "Merched Yn Neud Gwallt Eu Gilydd" (Ankst, June 1994)
- "The Game Of Eyes" (Ankst, November 1994)
- "Llanfwrog" EP (Ankst, 1994)
- "Gewn Ni Gorffen" (Ankst, July 1995)
- "If Fingers Were Xylophones" (Ankst, November 1995, UK No. 91)
- "Amber Gambler (EP)" (Ankst, June 1996, UK No. 91)
- "Patio Song" (Fontana, October 1996, UK No. 41)
- "Diamond Dew" (Fontana, March 1997, UK No. 42)
- "Young Girls & Happy Endings/Dark Nights" (Fontana, June 1997, UK No. 49)
- "Sweet Johnny" (Fontana, May 1998, UK No. 60)
- "Let's Get Together (In Our Minds)" (Fontana, August 1998, UK No. 43)
- "Spanish Dance Troupe" (Mantra, September 1999, UK No. 47)
- "Poodle Rockin'" (Mantra, February 2000, UK No. 52)
- "Stood On Gold" (Mantra, September 2001, UK No. 65)
- "Mow The Lawn" (Sanctuary, October 2003, UK No. 110)

== Members ==
=== Final lineup ===
- Euros Childs – vocals, keyboards (1991–2006)
- Megan Childs – violin, vocals (1992–2006)
- Richard James – guitar, vocals (1991–2006), bass guitar (1991–1999)
- Rhodri Puw – bass guitar (1999–2006)
- Peter Richardson – drums (2000–2006)

=== Previous members ===
- John Lawrence – vocals, guitar (1991–1999)
- Euros Rowlands – drums (1995–2001)
- Osian Evans – drums (1991–1995)
- Sion Lane – keyboards (1991)
- Cenwyn Brain – guitar (1991)
- Sammy Davies – keyboards (1991–1992)
- Steffan Cravos – violin (1991–1992)
- Damian Hern – bass (1991–1993)
