= Euros Childs =

Welsh keyboardist and songwriter (born 1975)

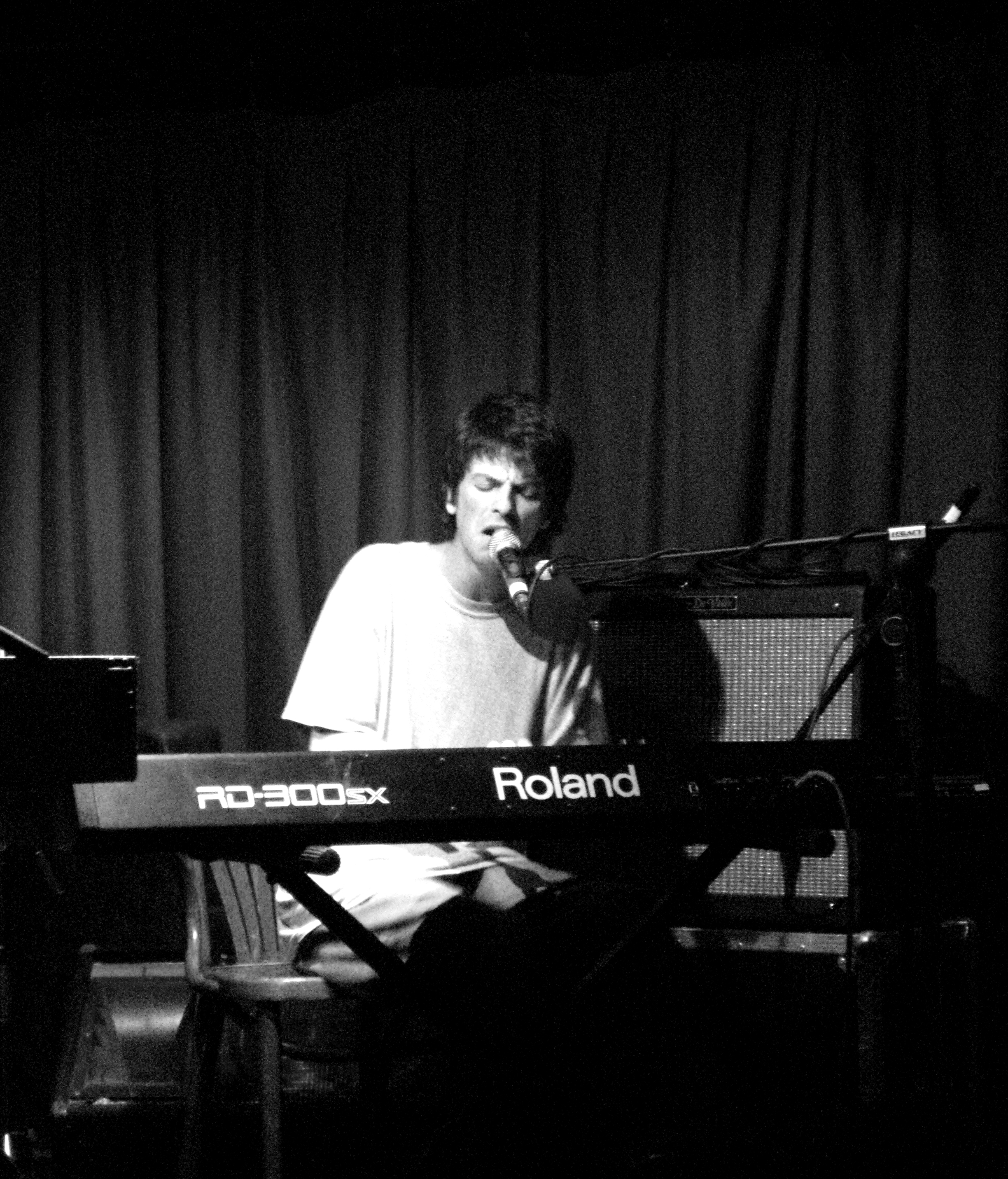
- Euros Childs performing at The Faversham, Leeds, 6 September 2008

Background information
- Born: 16 April 1975 (age 51)
- Origin: Freshwater East, Pembrokeshire, Wales
- Genres: Indie folk, indie rock, folk-pop
- Years active: 1991–2006 (Gorky's Zygotic Mynci); 2005–present (solo & other projects)
- Labels: National Elf, Wichita Recordings, V2 International
- Website: euroschilds.co.uk

Euros Childs (/ˈtʃaɪldz/; Welsh: [ˈəirɔs]; born 16 April 1975) is a Welsh musician and songwriter, perhaps best known as the frontman for the band Gorky's Zygotic Mynci and—as of January 2019—the keyboardist for Teenage Fanclub. His sister, violinist Megan Childs, was also a member of Gorky's Zygotic Mynci, and their father Lynn played on some Gorky's recordings, most notably on Barafundle. Childs was born in Freshwater East, Pembrokeshire, and was educated at the Welsh-medium school Ysgol Gyfun Gymraeg Bro Myrddin in Carmarthenshire.

== Career ==
Childs was a founder of Gorky's Zygotic Mynci and stayed with the band throughout its lifetime, writing or co-writing most songs, handling most lead vocals, and playing keyboards, among other instruments.

His first solo music appeared in 2005, and his first single, "Donkey Island", was released on Wichita Recordings in November of that year. His band for the subsequent UK tour included Gorky's drummer Peter Richardson and fellow Welsh musician Alun Tan Lan, who also has occasionally opened for Childs.

Childs' first solo album, Chops, was released on Wichita in February 2006, quickly followed by the other single from the album, "Costa Rita". By the middle of 2006, Gorky's Zygotic Mynci had announced their split, allowing Childs and Richard James to focus on their solo projects.

Childs' second solo album, the all-Welsh language Bore Da, was released in March 2007. This was followed in August of the same year by The Miracle Inn.

His fourth album, Cheer Gone, was released in October 2008. It was recorded over six days in Nashville with a band that included Richardson and Stephen Black, and had contributions from several Nashville musicians including Matt Swanson of Lambchop.

In 2009, Childs released his fifth album, Son of Euro Child, on his newly formed label National Elf. The album was available as a free download as well as on CD, and it began his current trend of releasing all his music through his official website on a "pay what you can" basis.

2009 also saw Childs form the duo Jonny with Teenage Fanclub's Norman Blake. They released their debut, Jonny, in 2011.

The album Ends was released on 28 November 2011. Its songs consist mostly of vocals and piano, with Megan Childs contributing violin on four of the 10 tracks.

In 2012, Childs established another duo, Cousins, this time with Race Horses' Meilyr Jones, who had previously appeared on Bore Da and The Miracle Inn. Their album First Cousins was released on 12 March 2012 on National Elf.

Childs and Peter Richardson have recorded under the name Ymarfer Corff. Childs has also been a member of Short & Curlies with frequent collaborators Stephen Black and Megan Childs, among others.

Summer Special was released on 20 August 2012, with a band consisting of Childs, Jones, Black, Stuart Kidd, and Megan Childs. The first single and video was "That's Better". The second single was "Be Be High" with the non-album B-side "The Surgeon".

The album Situation Comedy was released on 21 October 2013, preceded by the single "Tête à Tête" on 14 October. In his NME review that rated the album 8/10, Tom Pinnock called it "a set of witty piano-pop songs" with "a grim undertone". He opined that the closing 14-minute track "Trick of the Mind" was "perhaps Childs' most beautiful song ever".

In late 2014, Childs released his new album Eilaag, on CD and download through his website. Seven of the nine tracks are instrumental pieces for solo piano, the other two being solo vocal pieces accompanied by solo piano. His 11th studio album, Sweetheart came out on 2 October 2015. It featured a full band consisting of Marco Rea (guitar/backing vocals), Stuart Kidd (drums/backing vocals), Rhydian Jones (bass) and Laura J. Martin (flute). The album was recorded by Iwan Morgan in the village of Freshwater East.

On 9 December 2016, the next Childs album Refresh! was released on his label National Elf, preceded by streaming of the song Pick It Up (a song about cleaning after one's dog). Refresh! was recorded in collaboration with Stephen Black (Sweet Baboo) at Gus Dungeon II Studios, Cardiff, and consists of 24 songs made entirely of Euros's voice fed through a sampler, with exception of synth on Pick It Up and toy piano on Sky / Sea. As usual, the album is available on download, CD and vinyl.

In January 2017 Childs released an EP collaboration with Rosie Smith of Oh Peas! under the name Tim's Rice. The EP, Mixed Ability Pilates, was available as a pay-what-you-like download.

Childs's next album, House Arrest, was released on 17 November 2017. It was recorded at Gus Dungeon Studios (i.e. his Pembrokeshire home) and features the single My Colander. The album release was accompanied by a full UK tour, Childs's first since 2015.

On 16 January 2019, Teenage Fanclub announced that Childs had joined them on keyboards and vocals.

Childs continues to release solo albums via his website.

== Discography ==
=== Studio albums ===
- Chops (13 February 2006)
- Bore Da (5 March 2007)
- The Miracle Inn (27 August 2007)
- Cheer Gone (27 October 2008)
- Son of Euro Child (7 September 2009)
- Face Dripping (6 December 2010)
- Ends (28 November 2011)
- Summer Special (20 August 2012)
- Situation Comedy (21 October 2013)
- Eilaaig (24 November 2014)
- Sweetheart (2 October 2015)
- Refresh! (9 December 2016)
- House Arrest (17 November 2017)
- Olion (21 December 2018)
- Gingerbread House Explosion (20 December 2019)
- Kitty Dear (22 December 2020)
- Blaming It All On Love (22 December 2021)
- Curries (22 December 2022)
- Thrips (22 December 2023)
- Beehive Beach (25 October 2024)
- A-Pop (19 December 2025)

=== Live albums ===
- Yn Fyw/Live 2005 (31 January 2011 – download only)
- Yn Fyw/Live 2007 (4 February 2013 – download only)

=== Singles (partial) ===
- "Donkey Island" (28 November 2005)
- "Costa Rita" (24 April 2006)
- "Horse Riding" (6 August 2007)
- "I Will Not Mind" / "Pontiago" (2011)
- "Beef Bridge" EP (August 2011)
- "Emyn O Wdig" (October 2011)
- "Spin That Girl Around" / "Just a Dream" (28 May 2012)
- "That's Better" (13 August 2012)
- "Be Be High" / "The Surgeon" (12 November 2012)
- "Tête à Tête" (14 October 2013)
- "Fruit And Veg / Yr Aflonyddwr" (25 September 2015)
- "Fresh Water / Love Is a Memory" (15 January 2016)

=== Also appears on ===
- Gorky's Zygotic Mynci's entire catalogue
- In Between by Pondman (2002)
- Someday We Will Foresee Obstacles by Syd Matters (April 2005)
- The Unfairground by Kevin Ayers (10 September 2007)
- We Went Riding by Richard James (21 June 2010)
- Jonny by Jonny (12 April 2011)
- First Cousins by Cousins (Childs and Meilyr Jones) (16 March 2012)
- Pictures in the Morning by Richard James (23 April 2012)
- The single "Door to Tomorrow" by Beyond the Wizard's Sleeve (2012)
- At The Dance by Short & Curlies (3 June 2013)
- Mixed Ability Pilates EP by Tim's Rice (with Rosie Smith of Oh Peas!) (13 Jan 2017)
- Endless Arcade by Teenage Fanclub (2021)
- Nothing Lasts Forever by Teenage Fanclub (2023)
