= Ankst =

Welsh independent record label

Ankst logo

Ankst was a Welsh independent record label formed in 1988 at the University of Wales, Aberystwyth by Alun Llwyd, Gruffudd Jones and Emyr Glyn Williams. After a handful of low key cassette releases, the label relocated to Cardiff and became a more serious concern, providing a launch-pad for several popular Welsh artists, including Llwybr Llaethog, Super Furry Animals and Gorky's Zygotic Mynci. The Rough Guide to Wales described Ankst as "one of the most prolific, eclectic and innovative" of the 1990s Welsh music labels.

Between 1988 and 1997, the label put out some 80 releases before splitting in 1997 into two separate companies. Ankst Management (run by Llwyd and Jones and responsible for Melys, Super Furry Animals, Gorky's Zygotic Mynci, Los Campesinos!, The Longcut, and, for a time, Cerys Matthews) and Ankstmusik, the label, that Williams ran from his house in Pentraeth on Anglesey, converting the garage into an office and store-room. Ankst remained true to its low-budget not for profit ideals at a time when the 'Arts' in Wales fell to corporate control and public funding. In all, the label released over 170 records by a huge assortment of bands and performers, such as Tystion, Ectogram, Zabrinski, Rheinallt H Rowlands, MC Mabon and Wendykurk.

Ankst moved into film making in the 2000s, releasing the Bafta-winning Y Lleill in 2005.

Alun Llwyd also co-managed, with Kevin Tame, the Cardiff-based indie label Turnstile, home of Perfume Genius, Christopher Owens, Gruff Rhys, Cate Le Bon and others. He is now chief executive at PR/distribution label Pyst.

Emyr 'Ankst' Williams died at his home in Pentraeth on 17 January 2024, whilst receiving treatment for cancer. He was 57.

== See also ==
- Lists of record labels
- Full list of Ankst releases/artists - https://cy.wikipedia.org/wiki/Ankstmusik
