= Richard James (musician) =

Welsh-born musician (born 1971)

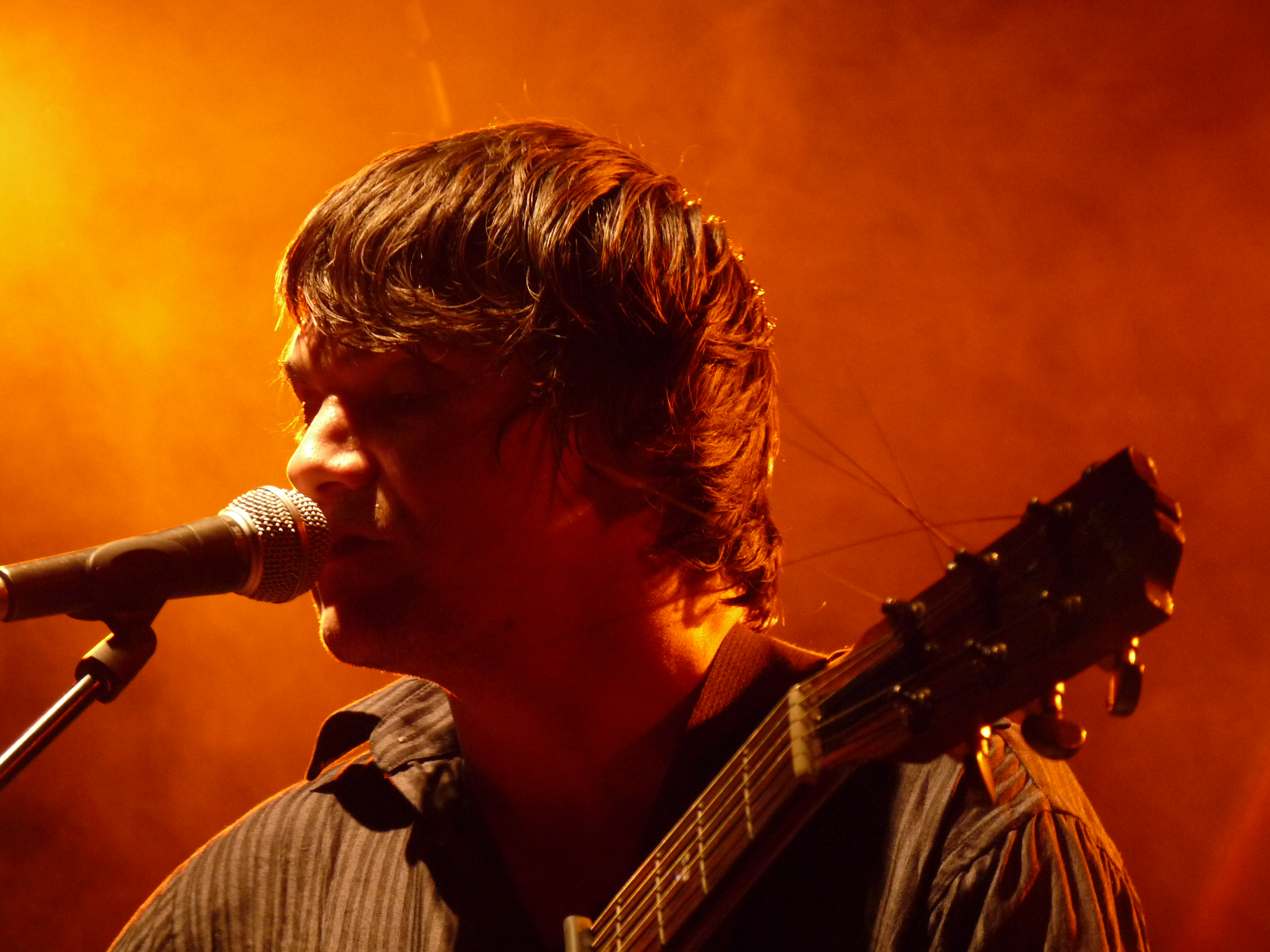
- Richard James (ex bass player for Gorky's Zygotic Mynci) at St David's Day gig in ICA, London - 27 February 2009

Background information
- Born: 27 March 1975 (age 50); Carmarthen, Wales
- Genres: Folk, indie folk, psychedelic pop, avant-garde
- Occupation(s): Musician, singer, songwriter, composer
- Instrument(s): Guitar, bass guitar
- Years active: 1991–present
- Labels: Gwymon, state51

Richard James (born 27 March 1975) is a guitarist, bassist and singer-songwriter originally from Carmarthen, Wales. He was a founding member of the band Gorky's Zygotic Mynci, who split up in 2006. He performs and records as a solo artist, and as part of the bands Pen Pastwn and Locus.

== Career ==
James was with Gorky's Zygotic Mynci throughout the band's lifespan, from 1991 to 2006, and appears on all their albums, initially mostly as a bassist. After John Lawrence left the band, James took Lawrence's place as guitarist. James wrote, and handles lead vocals on, some later Gorky's songs.

His first solo album, The Seven Sleepers Den, appeared in 2006. It featured backing vocals from Cate Le Bon (under her birth name of Cate Timothy).

His second album was released on 21 June 2010 from Gwymon Records. Called We Went Riding, it features the talents of Le Bon and Euros Childs.

In April 2012, James released his third album, Pictures in the Morning, also on Gwymon Records. Stylistically, it's a return to the sound of The Seven Sleepers Den.

James has curated the musical sides of both the annual Laugharne Weekend festival and In Chapters, a Cardiff-based event. His band Pen Pastwn evolved from the In Chapters house band. He has also long-collaborated with folk musician The Gentle Good.

James's fourth solo album, All the New Highways, was released in February 2015. It was originally a digital-only release on Bandcamp. In September the album was nominated for the 2014–2015 Welsh Music Prize. The album was released in physical form (vinyl and CD) in March 2016 on The state51 Conspiracy label.

James has also composed music for the screen, including for the S4C drama series Cara Fi (2014) and for Tir, the 2013 film and the 2015 series which followed it. He was nominated for a 2015 BAFTA Cymru award for Original Music for his work on Cara Fi.

Since 2016 James has participated in a collaborative project with his partner, musician and artist Angharad van Rjiswijk, called Locus, which among other work involved improvisational sound collages being performed live. In 2017 James was commissioned by the BBC to write a new orchestral piece for the BBC National Orchestra of Wales, with van Rjiswijk supplying visuals for the debut performance in November 2017.

James and van Rjiswijk currently live in west Wales.

== Solo discography ==
- The Seven Sleepers Den (2006)
- We Went Riding (21 June 2010)
- Pictures in the Morning (23 April 2012)
- All the New Highways (16 February 2015)
