= Phantom Power (Super Furry Animals album) =

Album by Super Furry Animals

Studio album by Super Furry Animals
- Released: 21 July 2003
- Recorded: 2002
- Studio: The Sauna (Cardiff); Rockfield (Rockfield, Wales); Monnow Valley (Monmouth); Wings for Jesus (Tiger Bay)
- Genre: Progressive pop; art rock; neo-psychedelia; indie rock
- Length: 52:32
- Label: Epic
- Producer: Super Furry Animals

Super Furry Animals chronology
Rings Around the World (2001)	Phantom Power (2003)	Slow Life (2004)

Singles from Phantom Power
- 1. "Golden Retriever" Released: 14 July 2003; 2. "Hello Sunshine" Released: 20 October 2003; 3. "Slow Life EP" Released: 12 April 2004

Phantom Power is the sixth studio album by Welsh indie rock band Super Furry Animals, released on 21 July 2003 by Epic Records in the United Kingdom. The record was originally conceived as a ten-song concept album using D-A-D-D-A-D guitar tuning, but the band chose to abandon this idea during recording as they didn't want to constrain themselves. The group did attempt to create a "more coherent" album than their past efforts by choosing songs which worked well together. Phantom Power was recorded at the band's own studio, AV Happenings, in Cardiff with the Super Furries producing and engineering themselves for the first time. The album features a range of musical styles, from country rock to techno, although many of the tracks are based around the acoustic guitar. According to chief songwriter and vocalist Gruff Rhys, the album's lyrics deal with "broken relationships and war".

The album, like their previous record Rings Around the World, was simultaneously released on CD, vinyl and DVD. The DVD featured a surround sound mix of the album along with animations, commentary by Mario Caldato Jr. (who mixed the record) and remixes. The majority of these remixes were re-released as the album Phantom Phorce in 2004. Phantom Power was well received, with many critics suggesting it was the best album of the band's career.

== Origins and recording ==
Phantom Power was originally conceived as a ten-song cycle in the "unconventional" D-A-D-D-A-D guitar tuning. Singer Gruff Rhys wrote many of the songs on the album in this tuning and in the key of D major during the space of a few days. These tracks, which included the "Father Father" instrumentals, "Golden Retriever", "Hello Sunshine", "Valet Parking" and "Out of Control", were then demoed at the house of regular producer Gorwel Owen with overdubs added at the band's own office-block based studio, AV Happenings, in Cardiff.

The group took a hands-on approach to the actual recording sessions for Phantom Power, engineering and producing themselves for the first time. Recording largely took place at AV Happenings during the second half of 2002, with the band working through the night so as not to disturb staff who worked in other parts of the building during the day. According to bassist Guto Pryce this involved a fair amount of trial and error as the band "didn't really know what [they] were doing". Soundproof booths were improvised by setting up tents in the office corridors: "we'd record a guitar and it'd sound rubbish and we had to figure out why. So we started experimenting with different tent designs. In the end it was the wigwam that was easiest to put up and sounded best". The band had to take these booths down before office workers arrived in the morning, a process that guitarist Huw Bunford has described as "ghosts in the night ... a bit clandestine". A brief two-week session with Gorwel Owen at Rockfield Studios saw some of the album's more "straight ahead" tracks recorded with live vocals before the band returned to AV Happenings and "messed around" with them. When the album was almost finished the band enlisted the services of Tony Doogan who engineered sessions during which several vocal parts were recorded.

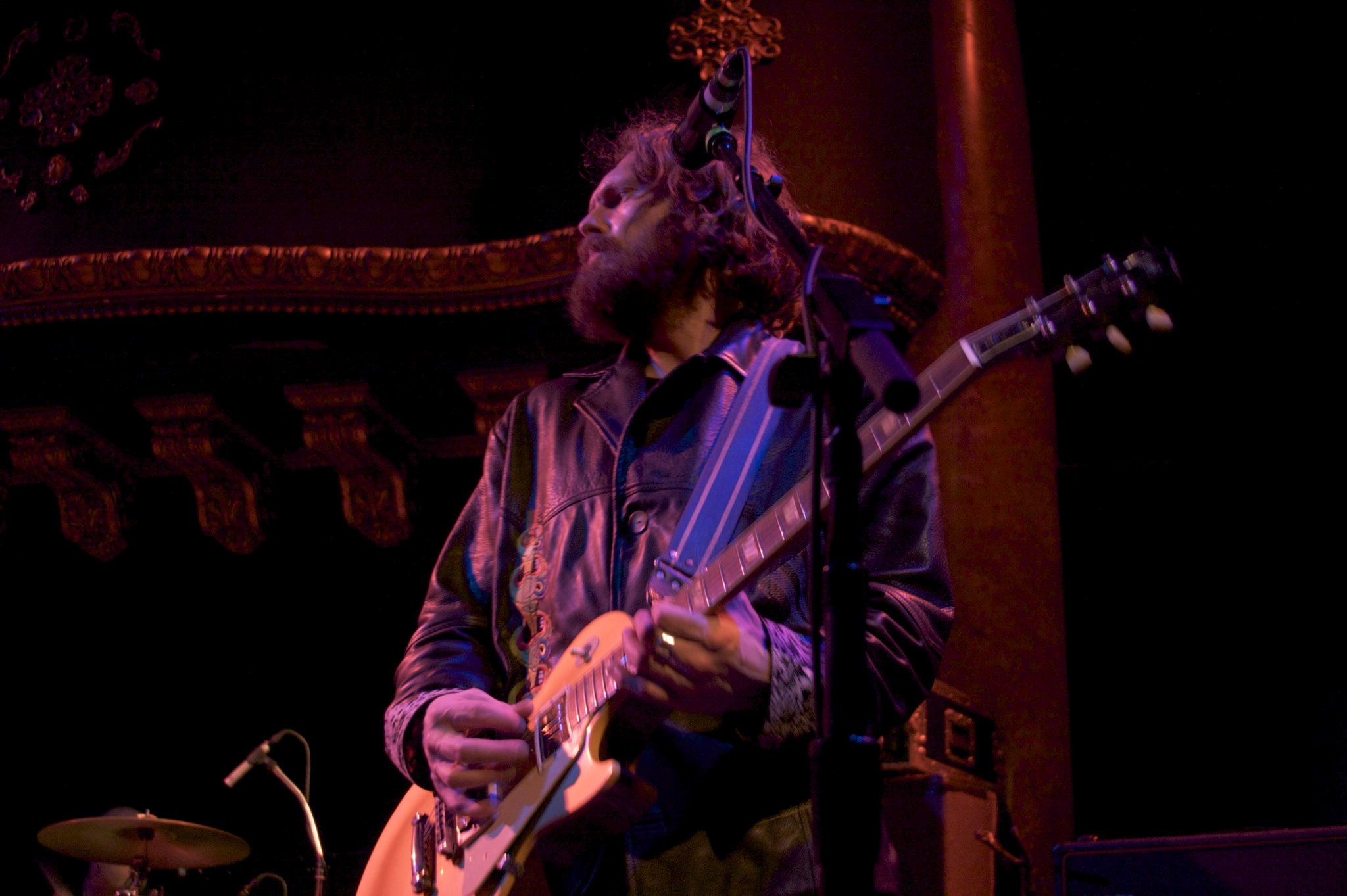
Huw Bunford wrote the track "Sex, War & Robots" for Phantom Power and also provided lead vocals.

The ten song D-A-D-D-A-D concept was eventually abandoned with Pryce stating "we don't like constraining ourselves and if you've got a concept, you're doing that. And we had some other really nice tunes so we just chose the best songs". According to Rhys the only plan the group stuck to was to make a "more coherent" record: "In the past ... we'd put ideas kind of side by side, and on this record we wanted all those sounds to be more blended". Following arguments over the track listing of previous album Rings Around the World, after a "lot of songs" were recorded necessitating four months worth of discussions about which tracks to leave off the record, the group recorded just 16 largely acoustic based songs during the sessions for Phantom Power. Rhys's initial batch of songs were augmented by, among others, the Huw Bunford penned "Sex, War & Robots", the first time the guitarist had had one of his songs included on a Super Furry Animals album and also the first time he had sung lead vocals for the group, "Slow Life", which grew out of an electronic piece of music keyboardist Cian Ciaran had been working on for several years and "The Piccolo Snare" which was partly written in the studio.

== Music ==
Super Furry Animals "Venus & Serena" (2003)
"Venus & Serena" is one of several tracks on Phantom Power to exhibit country rock influences and showcases the band's use of harmony vocals.

Super Furry Animals "Slow Life" (2003)
Short clip from "Slow Life", which merges techno with guitar pop, to illustrate the difference in styles between many of the tracks on Phantom Power.

After the more produced Rings Around the World, which relied heavily on computers and electronics, the group were keen to make Phantom Power "a little more human" with guitarist Huw Bunford stating: "with technology you can do anything these days, but sometimes less is more". Many songs on the album are acoustic based and bass player Guto Pryce has claimed that they sounded "pretty good right from the start" which also contributed to the decision to avoid "over-tweak[ing] them in the studio". Despite this the group did work electronic loops into several tracks after Ciaran bought a large number of "sound effect and light music" vinyl records from a man who worked in the same building. According to Rhys: "he knocked on the door just as we were beginning the album: "hey, I've got these records to sell, are ya interested?" And Cian went down to check them out and gave him a hundred pounds on the spot and carried 700 albums back to our tiny room".

The album showcases an eclectic range of sounds from the country rock of "Sex, War & Robots", featuring pedal steel guitar, to the heavy metal and punk of "Out of Control" and the glam rock of first single "Golden Retriever". "Slow Life", a track which singer Gruff Rhys has described as the "most sonically impressive" song on Phantom Power, features techno influences and is based on a piece of electronic music written by keyboardist Cian Ciaran several years earlier. Ciaran encouraged the band to jam on top of his original track to produce a fusion of techno and guitar-pop. "The Undefeated" is inspired by ska and reggae music, although the group removed a "cheesy white reggae" section from the song because it sounded "fucking horrible" and actively tried not to make it sound too much like a ska or reggae track as they felt they "couldn't pull it off". Many tracks feature close vocal harmonies, with all the band apart from Pryce contributing. These harmonies give the album a California / West Coast of America feel, with comparisons being drawn to the work of The Beach Boys, particularly on the song "Venus and Serena".

== Lyrical themes ==
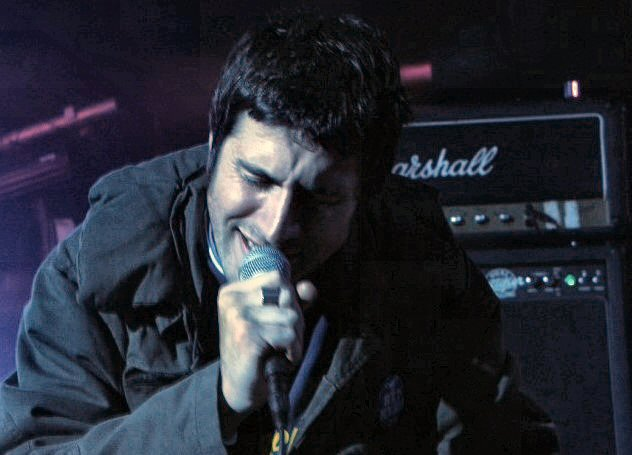
Chief lyricist Gruff Rhys describes Phantom Power as a record about "broken relationships and war" with "a positive outlook to the future".

Singer and chief lyric writer Gruff Rhys has claimed that Phantom Power is about "broken relationships and war" with "a positive outlook to the future". As "BBC News 24 addicts" Rhys and the band absorbed "fucked up war images" from the Iraq War during the making of the album which affected the way songs were written: "We seem to be living in such a heavy time. We're just absorbing all the words thrown at us from the TV and regurgitating them back." Frustration with the George Bush administration and its foreign policy influenced the record with Rhys claiming that he feels qualified to address the subject as United States foreign policy "effectively decides what the foreign policy is in the UK".

The two most overtly "political" tracks on Phantom Power are "The Piccolo Snare" and "Liberty Belle". "The Piccolo Snare" is about "societies torn apart by war and the waste of human life". The track uses the vocabulary of the Falklands War (Tumbledown, Skyhawks etc.) but Rhys claims it is applicable to any war. "Liberty Belle" tells the story of two cartoon characters devised by Rhys, 'Liberty Belle' and 'Memory Lane', the former representing the "bells of freedom", specifically the American Dream, and the latter representing "history's harsh lessons" which Liberty Belle has failed to learn. The song is told from the perspective of a "bird living almost in a parallel universe to humans, oblivious to the gravity of the games which are being played around us", something which Rhys admits to feeling himself much of the time. "Venus and Serena" uses a story of a child who talks to his pet tortoises, Venus and Serena, as he can't communicate with his elders to make a similar point: that people feel alienated from their elected leaders. Both "Out of Control" and "Slow Life" feature regurgitated media buzzwords, with "Out of Control's" "flippant" lyrics designed to create the feel of "an over-dramatic theme to a current affairs programme". "Bleed Forever" deals specifically with the nuclear fallout from the Chernobyl disaster which fell over North Wales, allegedly causing an increase in incidents of leukaemia among children in the area.

However, Rhys has been keen to point out that the record is not a forcefully political one, claiming that most of the band's songs are "fragments of daily life; occasionally politics are a part of that. Super Furry Animals is about exploration, not political campaigning". "Valet Parking", for example, is a song about "the glories of pan-European travel", documenting a road trip from Cardiff to Vilnius, "Golden Retriever" is about "the relationship between [Gruff Rhys's] girlfriend's two dogs - a male and a female" and "The Undefeated", inspired by a poor run of results for the Welsh football team, is about "underdogs and overdogs".

== DVD ==
Phantom Power

Video by Super Furry Animals
- Released: 21 July 2003
- Genre: Progressive pop; art rock; neo-psychedelia; indie rock
- Label: Epic

Super Furry Animals chronology
Rings Around the World (2001)	Phantom Power (2003)	Songbook: The Singles, Vol. 1 (2004)

The DVD of Phantom Power contains the 14 songs featured on the CD version of the album in surround sound, 16 remixes, commentary by Mario Caldato Jr. who mixed the record and provided one of the remixes, and song lyrics.

According to singer Gruff Rhys, the concept behind the DVD was based on the success of platform games: the listener can play the album as if it were a game and spend "months ... instead of weeks" exploring the content. Unlike the DVD version of previous album Rings Around the World, which featured videos for every track, the songs on the DVD are accompanied by slowly moving animations. Rhys has stated that the Super Furry Animals wanted to use "really bland images" as viewers began to place too much emphasis on the videos on Rings Around the World and the band wanted them to concentrate on the music.

Keyboardist Cian Ciaran stated at the time of Phantom Power's release that the band would issue a DVD with every future album, claiming that "this is just the way we make records now". However, the band's next two albums, Love Kraft and Hey Venus!, were not made available on DVD and, in a 2008 interview with Uncut, Rhys suggested that the release had been something of a failure: "no one gave a shit because people just want to rock n' roll!"

The remixes on the DVD version of Phantom Power vary from radical reworkings such as Killa Kella's beatbox treatment of "Golden Retriever" and Wauvenfold's "unrecognisable" version of "Sex, War and Robots", to the likes of Mario Caldato Jr's take on "Liberty Belle" and High Llamas' "Valet Parking" which are merely "spruced up". The majority of the remixes were reissued on CD as the album Phantom Phorce in 2004. According to drummer Dafydd Ieuan the band didn't have the money to pay the artists involved for their remix work so, in order to provide them with royalties, promised to release an album featuring the tracks on their own label, Placid Casual.

Hidden footage of the band firing machine guns can be reached by selecting the song "The Undefeated", waiting 22 seconds until the lettering starts to blink and pressing 'Enter' ('Enter' must be pressed before the lettering blinks for a second time at 24 seconds). Guitarist Huw Bunford has described this footage as being "exactly how it looked on the tin ... noisy, full of testosterone, with pumped up guys in the woods trying to kill furry animals!"

== Release ==
Phantom Power was released on CD, vinyl and DVD on 21 July 2003 in the United Kingdom on Sony's Epic imprint. The album reached #4 in the UK Albums Chart. In America the album was released on 22 July 2003 by Beggars Banquet US. Phantom Power was released on 21 July 2003 in Japan with two additional tracks, "Summer Snow" and "Blue Fruit", added after "Slow Life" at the end of the album. "Golden Retriever" was released as the first single from the album, reaching #13 in the UK Singles Chart, followed by "Hello Sunshine" in October 2003 which peaked at #31. The Slow Life EP was released as a free download from the website of the band's record label, Placid Casual, on 12 April 2004, featuring the title track, "Lost Control" (a remix of "Out of Control"), and the Goldie Lookin Chain collaboration, "Motherfokker". The majority of the remixes from the DVD version of Phantom Power were released as Phantom Phorce on Placid Casual on 19 April 2004. Initial copies of this album came bundled with a CD version of the Slow Life EP. Phantom Power has been certified silver in the United Kingdom, denoting sales of more than 60,000 copies.

Region	Date	Label	Format	Catalogue
Japan	21 July 2003	Epic Records Japan	Compact disc	EICP-229
United Kingdom	21 July 2003	Epic	Vinyl record	5123751
United Kingdom	21 July 2003	Epic	Compact disc	5123759
United Kingdom	21 July 2003	Epic	DVD	202072 9
United States	22 July 2003	XL Recordings/Beggars Banquet US	Compact disc	BXL 035 CD

== Critical reception ==
Professional ratings
Aggregate scores
Source	Rating
Metacritic	87/100
Review scores
Source	Rating
AllMusic	4/5 stars
Entertainment Weekly	B
The Guardian	3/5 stars
Mojo	4/5 stars
NME	9/10
Pitchfork	8.9/10
Q	4/5 stars
Rolling Stone	3/5 stars
The Rolling Stone Album Guide	4/5 stars
Spin	A

Phantom Power received generally positive reviews from critics with a score of 87 on Metacritic, denoting "universal acclaim". Drowned in Sound described the album as "another fine, esoteric wonder of an LP", while the NME claimed it is the group's "most focussed, energetic pop record since Radiator" and went on to state that "for a band to be hitting such form six albums into a steady career is astonishing". Q called it "the band's best work to date, as accessible as it is inventive"; The Times agreed, calling Phantom Power "the Furries’ most satisfying album to date ... one to cherish." Several critics commented on the "summery pop" nature of the record with Tiny Mix Tapes likening the album to "the sun shining through following a large and brooding thunderstorm" and The Times calling it "mellow summer listening" despite the "grim view of the world" expressed in Gruff Rhys's lyrics. The NME found that Phantom Power compares favourably with the band's previous release, Rings Around the World, losing some of that album's mainstream polish. AllMusic agreed, expressing relief that the band had loosened up following Rings..., which the website described as "often sounding constrained by its polished widescreen aspirations". Irish website entertainment.ie saw Phantom Power as "a highly polished affair, filled with the widescreen classic pop that Gruff Rhys and co. carry off so effortlessly ... thankfully free of the techno experiments that marred so much of their previous work".

There was some criticism of the album with The Guardian accusing the band of "treading water", the album suffering from overfamiliarity as the group's sixth release despite being a "lovely record". Stylus Magazine expressed similar views, claiming that Phantom Power "feels very much like business as usual for the Welsh wizards, as if they've made just another album". In a 2008 interview with Uncut Rhys described Phantom Power as his favourite Super Furries album, although he conceded that all the band's records "have their moments".

=== Accolades ===
Publication	Country	Accolade	Year	Rank
Tutto Musica!	Italy	Best 100 albums of the year 2003	2003	56
Iguana Music	Spain	Best albums 2003	2003	89
Mondo Sonoro	Spain	Best records 2003	2003	11
Bang	United Kingdom	Bang albums of 2003: Best of the rest	2003	*
The Face	United Kingdom	Albums of the year 2003: We also loved	2003	*
NME	United Kingdom	Albums of 2003	2003	27
Mojo	United Kingdom	Mojo albums of 2003	2003	16
Q	United Kingdom	End of year lists	2003	24
Record Collector	United Kingdom	Best of 2003: New albums	2003	9
The Village Voice	United States	Pazz & Jop Albums of 2003	2003	87

* denotes an unordered list

== Track listing ==
=== CD/Vinyl ===
All tracks are written by Super Furry Animals.

No.	Title	Length
1.	"Hello Sunshine"	3:35
2.	"Liberty Belle"	2:58
3.	"Golden Retriever"	2:25
4.	"Sex, War & Robots"	3:50
5.	"The Piccolo Snare"	6:08
6.	"Venus & Serena"	3:24
7.	"Father Father #1" (Instrumental)	1:54
8.	"Bleed Forever"	3:40
9.	"Out of Control"	2:42
10.	"Cityscape Skybaby"	4:34
11.	"Father Father #2" (Instrumental)	1:30
12.	"Valet Parking"	4:35
13.	"The Undefeated"	4:08
14.	"Slow Life"	6:59

Japanese CD release bonus tracks
No.	Title	Length
15.	"Summer Snow"	2:30
16.	"Blue Fruit"	4:42

DVD
No.	Title	Length
1.	"Hello Sunshine"	3:35
2.	"Liberty Belle"	2:58
3.	"Golden Retriever"	2:25
4.	"Sex, War & Robots"	3:49
5.	"The Piccolo Snare"	6:08
6.	"Venus & Serena"	3:24
7.	"Father Father #1" (Instrumental)	1:54
8.	"Bleed Forever"	3:39
9.	"Out of Control"	2:43
10.	"Cityscape Skybaby"	4:34
11.	"Father Father #2" (Instrumental)	1:30
12.	"Valet Parking"	4:35
13.	"The Undefeated"	4:07
14.	"Slow Life"	6:59
15.	"Hello Sunshine (Freiband Remix)"	10:31
16.	"Hello Sunshine (Weevil Remix)"	4:42
17.	"Liberty Belle (Mario's Remix)"	2:59
18.	"Golden Retriever (Killa Kella Remix)"	2:33
19.	"Sex, War & Robots (Wauvenfold Remix)"	3:23
20.	"The Piccolo Snare (Fourtet Remix)"	7:08
21.	"Venus & Serena (Massimo Remix)"	2:57
22.	"Father Father (Boom Bip Remix)"	4:54
23.	"Bleed Forever (Brave Captain Remix)"	6:12
24.	"Out of Control (Zan Lyons Remix)"	4:56
25.	"Cityscape Skybaby (Minotaur Shock)"	5:55
26.	"Valet Parking (Force Unknown Remix)"	5:06
27.	"Valet Parking (Sean O'Hagan Remix)"	5:06
28.	"The Undefeated (Llwybr Llaethog Remix)"	3:43
29.	"Slow Life (Bench Remix)"	5:29
30.	"Sir Doufus Styles (Elec. Logoland Duih)"	5:06

== Personnel ==
- Gruff Rhys – lead vocals, rhythm guitar, keyboards, harmonica, backing vocals
- Huw Bunford – lead guitar, backing vocals, lead vocals on "Sex, War & Robots"
- Guto Pryce – bass guitar
- Cian Ciaran – keyboards, guitar, backing vocals
- Dafydd Ieuan – drums, backing vocals

=== Additional musicians ===
- Jonathan 'Catfish' Thomas – pedal steel guitar on tracks 4, 13
- Kris Jenkins – percussion on tracks 1, 5, 6, 7, 9, 13, 14
- Rachel Thomas – backing vocals on tracks 3, 4
- Gary Alsebrook – trumpet on tracks 6, 7
- Savio Pacini – trombone on tracks 6, 7
- Rico Rodriguez – trombone on track 13
- Eddie Thornton – trumpet on track 13
- Ray Carless – saxophone on track 13
- Marcus Holdway – cello on tracks 4, 7, 13, 14
- Sally Herbert – violin on tracks 4, 7, 14
- Brian G. Wright – violin on tracks 4, 7, 14
- Gill Morley – violin on tracks 4, 7, 14
- Ellen Blair – violin on tracks 4, 7, 14
- Pete Fowler – Kaoss flanges on track 14
- Neil McFarland – Kaoss flanges on track 14

=== Remixers (DVD) ===
- Weevil
- Mario Caldato Jr.
- Killa Kela
- Wauvenfold
- Four Tet
- Massimo
- Boom Bip
- bravecaptain
- Zan Lyons
- Minotaur Shock
- High Llamas
- Llwybr Llaethog
- Bench
- Sir Doufous Styles
- Force Unknown
- Freiband

=== Production ===
- Super Furry Animals – production, mixing, engineering, surround sound mix
- Mario Caldato Jr. – mixing
- Jeff Knowler – mixing assistant
- Gorwel Owen – engineering (Rockfield Studios)
- Jason Harris – engineering assistant (Rockfield Studios)
- Tim Lewis – engineering assistant (Rockfield Studios)
- Tony Doogan – engineering (Monnow Valley Studios)
- Sir Doufous Styles – engineering assistant (Monnow Valley Studios and AV Happenings AKA The Sauna), engineering (Wings for Jesus)
- Stuart Hawkes – mastering

=== Design ===
- Pete Fowler – illustration
- JMJ@akamushi.com – design

== Charts ==
Chart	Peak position
Ireland Albums Chart	12
Norway Albums Chart	36
UK Albums Chart	4
U.S. Top Heatseekers	17
U.S. Top Independent Albums	14
