= Phantom Phorce =

Remix album by Super Furry Animals
- Released: 19 April 2004
- Length: 74:44; 79:11 (with commentary)
- Label: Placid Casual

Super Furry Animals chronology
Slow Life (2004)	Phantom Phorce (2004)	Songbook: The Singles, Vol. 1 (2004)

Phantom Phorce is a remix album of Super Furry Animals' 2003 record Phantom Power. The remixes had previously appeared on the DVD version of Phantom Power—they were re-released as Phantom Phorce on the band's own Placid Casual label as a way of ensuring the remixers would receive royalties for the tracks. The album features a commentary from the fictional 'Kurt Stern' who appears between songs to discuss the re-recording of Phantom Power under his guidance after being unhappy with the original. First editions of the album came packaged in a case that doubled as a paper model of a video game arcade cabinet, and included a bonus CD; the Slow Life EP. Critical reaction to Phantom Phorce was generally positive.

== Origins, concept and music ==
Initial copies of Phantom Phorce came in packaging which could be folded into the shape of a video game arcade cabinet.

Phantom Phorce features remixes previously available on the DVD version of Phantom Power. According to drummer Dafydd Ieuan the band didn't have the money to pay the artists involved for these remixes so, in order to provide them with royalties, promised to release an album featuring the tracks on their own label.

The record features remixes of every track from 2003's Phantom Power presented in sequence, along with extra versions of "Valet Parking" and "Hello Sunshine" which appear at the end of the album. The remixes vary from radical reworkings such as Killa Kella's beatbox treatment of "Golden Retriever" and Wauvenfold's "unrecognisable" version of "Sex, War and Robots", to the likes of Mario Caldato Jr's take on "Liberty Belle" and High Llamas' "Valet Parking" which are merely "spruced up".

The remixes are interspersed with anecdotes from 'Kurt Stern' (actually the band's road manager) who supposedly made the decision to make these remixes after being unhappy with the original Phantom Power. According to bassist Guto Pryce this "running commentary is tongue in cheek, it's our road manager pretending to be a producer, and he ends up sounding like a... twat!" These anecdotes give the actual release a different track listing from that which appears on the back of the album.

== Release and reception ==
Professional ratings
Review scores
Source	Rating
Exclaim!	(favourable)
The Guardian	(favourable)
musicOMH	(favourable)
NME	(7/10)
Pitchfork	(7.0/10)
PopMatters	(favourable)
Q	3/5
The Times	3/5
Uncut	4/5
Western Mail	(4/5)

Initial copies of the album came bundled with the Slow Life EP in packaging which could be folded into the shape of a video game arcade cabinet, or "personal console" as described on the instructions section of the sleeve. The CDs themselves were housed in individual sleeves designed to look like 3.5" floppy disks. Zeth Lundy, reviewing the album for PopMatters, commented that he constructed the arcade cabinet with "sheer geeky delight" while CokeMachineGlow called the packaging "nostalgic but infuriating". Phantom Phorce was also issued on gold-coloured vinyl.

Critical reaction to Phantom Phorce was generally positive with Uncut stating that the album features an "inspired overhaul" of tracks from Phantom Power, the Western Mail describing the record as a "mind-bending collection that radically re-works each track from the original record to create something entirely different, but equally appealing" and musicOMH calling it "an innovative and thoroughly enjoyable set of remixes". Some reviews pointed out that the album compares favourably with other remix albums with The Guardian calling Phantom Phorce "stimulating and often rather beautiful, bucking the trend set by most other self-indulgent and pointless remix albums" and the NME stating that "hearing a rock band get the remix treatment is usually a mildly diverting experience rather than a life-changing one. So it's an extremely pleasant surprise to be faced with a whole album of the buggers ... and be thoroughly entertained." Q stated that the commentary by 'Kurt Stern' was one of the best features of the album and The Times expressed surprise that these "'amusing interludes' between tracks are actually funny", however Pitchfork found that 'Stern' "gets in the way more than he helps" and claimed that, by the time the listener had heard the full album he or she would "likely consider redubbing it without ['Stern's'] contributions". Reviewing Phantom Phorce for DiSCORDER magazine, Jordie Yow called it "good, but not exceptional" and claimed that the remixes simply made him want to listen to the original versions of the tracks while website Angry Ape was scathing, calling the album a "bland & uninspiring package to put you off remixes for life" and suggested that it was merely a "cash-in" by the band.

== Track listing ==
All tracks are written by Super Furry Animals.

No.	Title	Remixer(s)	Length
1.	"Hello Sunshine"	Weevil	4:22
2.	"Liberty Belle"	Mario Caldato Jr.	2:59
3.	"Golden Retriever"	Killa Kela	2:33
4.	"Sex, War & Robots"	Wauvenfold	3:23
5.	"The Piccolo Snare"	Four Tet	7:08
6.	"Venus & Serena"	Massimo	2:57
7.	"Father Father"	Boom Bip	4:54
8.	"Bleed Forever"	Bravecaptain	6:12
9.	"Out of Control"	Zan Lyons	4:56
10.	"Cityscape Skybaby"	Minotaur Shock	5:55
11.	"Valet Parking"	High Llamas	5:06
12.	"The Undefeated"	Llwybr Llaethog	3:43
13.	"Slow Life"	Sir Doufous Styles	5:06
14.	"Valet Parking"	Force Unknown	5:06
15.	"Hello Sunshine"	Freiband	10:31

Full track listing, including 'Kurt Stern' commentary
No.	Title	Length
1.	"My name is Kurt Stern..."	0:32
2.	"Hello Sunshine" (Weevil remix)	4:22
3.	"Liberty Belle" (Mario Caldato Jr. remix)	2:59
4.	"Well, the band said that they wanted to be challenged..."	0:09
5.	"Golden Retriever" (Killa Kela remix)	2:33
6.	"Sex, War & Robots" (Wauvenfold remix)	3:23
7.	"It's a lovely little number here..."	0:17
8.	"The Piccolo Snare" (Four Tet remix)	7:08
9.	"I think the band will have a tough time..."	0:06
10.	"Venus & Serena" (Massimo remix)	2:57
11.	"I have to smile here..."	0:22
12.	"Father Father" (Boom Bip remix)	4:54
13.	"Something truly odd..."	0:20
14.	"Bleed Forever" (bravecaptain remix)	6:12
15.	"Lately a fire brigade of bands..."	0:44
16.	"Out of Control" (Zan Lyons remix)	4:56
17.	"On such a lovely song as this one..."	0:24
18.	"Cityscape Skybaby" (Minotaur Shock remix)	5:55
19.	"This is Daf's turn to get a bit loopy..."	0:24
20.	"Valet Parking" (High Llamas remix)	5:06
21.	"And uh, coming up here you're gonna hear..."	0:20
22.	"The Undefeated" (Llwybr Llaethog remix)	3:43
23.	"Slow Life" (Sir Doufous Styles remix)	5:06
24.	"OK this is rock star time..."	0:23
25.	"Valet Parking" (Force Unknown remix)	5:06
26.	"This song worked equally well we discovered...""	0:14
27.	"Hello Sunshine" (Freiband remix)	10:31
28.	"It's always a battle collaborating with someone else..."	0:18

== Personnel ==
The following people contributed to Phantom Phorce:

=== Band ===
- Gruff Rhys – Lead vocals, rhythm guitar
- Huw Bunford – Lead guitar, backing vocals
- Guto Pryce – Bass guitar
- Cian Ciaran – Keyboards, backing vocals
- Dafydd Ieuan – Drums, backing vocals

=== Remixers ===
- Weevil
- Mario Caldato Jr.
- Killa Kela
- Wauvenfold
- Four Tet
- Massimo
- Boom Bip
- Bravecaptain
- Zan Lyons
- Minotaur Shock
- High Llamas
- Llwybr Llaethog
- Sir Doufous Styles
- Force Unknown
- Freiband

=== Additional musicians ===
- Jonathan 'Catfish' Thomas – pedal steel guitar on tracks 4, 13
- Kris Jenkins – percussion on tracks 1, 5, 6, 7, 9, 13, 14, 15
- Rachel Thomas – backing vocals on tracks 3, 4
- Gary Alsebrook – trumpet on tracks 6, 7
- Savio Pacini – trombone on tracks 6, 7
- Rico Rodriguez – trombone on track 13
- Eddie Thornton – trumpet on track 13
- Ray Carless – saxophone on track 13
- Marcus Holdway – cello on tracks 4, 7, 13, 14
- Sally Herbert – violin on tracks 4, 7, 14
- Brian G. Wright – violin on tracks 4, 7, 14
- Gill Morley – violin on tracks 4, 7, 14
- Ellen Blair – violin on tracks 4, 7, 14
- Pete Fowler – Kaoss flanges on track 14
- Neil McFarland – Kaoss flanges on track 14

=== Artwork ===
- Pete Fowler – Illustration & design
- John Mark James – Illustration & design
