= Slow Life =

EP by Super Furry Animals
- Released: 12 April 2004
- Recorded: 2003–2004
- Genre: Experimental rock
- Length: 17:22
- Label: Placid Casual
- Producers: Mario Caldato Jr., Super Furry Animals

Super Furry Animals chronology
| Phantom Power (2003) | Slow Life (2004) | Phantom Phorce (2004) |

Slow Life is an EP by the Welsh alternative rock band Super Furry Animals, released in 2004. The EP was made available as a free download and also saw a limited CD release, bundled with remix album Phantom Phorce. Lead track "Slow Life" appeared on the 2003 album Phantom Power and was originally composed as a purely electronic song by keyboardist Cian Ciaran several years earlier. The band were keen to finish the track and Ciaran encouraged them to jam over his original version—this jam was then edited and made into the finished song. The track "Motherfokker" is a collaboration between the Super Furry Animals and rap group Goldie Lookin Chain.

The EP received mixed reviews although "Slow Life" itself was singled out for praise by many critics. A music video was made to accompany the track directed by Dylan Jones and Paps O'Maoileoain. The Super Furries appeared in the 2004 film 9 Songs playing "Slow Life" live during a scene in which one of the characters attends a gig by the band at the Brixton Academy.

== Recording and themes ==
"Slow Life" was written in two stages. According to bassist Guto Pryce the "electronic part" was composed by keyboard player Cian Ciaran "quite a few years" before its eventual release. The band had tried to fit this early, purely electronic, version on previous albums but had "never got 'round to it". By the time the group came to record Phantom Power they were anxious to release the song, however Ciaran was reluctant to leave it in its original form and encouraged the rest of the band to jam over his original track. According to singer Gruff Rhys the instrumentation was recorded "pretty much live" after which lyrics were written and the band's 10-minute jam session was "chopped ... up and made into a composed song" with the electronic section intact. Strings were later added by Sean O'Hagan. Rhys has stated that renting their own studio in Cardiff has given the band the ability to work on tracks such as "Slow Life" over a period of years—the group visit the studio almost every day and play: "the best parts on any of our records, I think, come out of a couple of us being in our little room in Cardiff at three in the morning, just wigging out and being ecstatic in the music."

According to guitarist Huw Bunford the track had the working title "Miami Vice" as it featured a drum roll similar to one used in the theme tune to the 80's television show of the same name. The band decided not to keep this name as they were keen to avoid links with a particular place—Bunford gave the example of the song's use on a travel documentary about Miami as something the group did not want to see. Some promotional copies of Phantom Power featured "Slow Life" as the first track although it eventually appeared as the last track on the officially released version of the album. Gruff Rhys has stated that the song had to go at either the beginning or the end of the record as it is the "most sonically impressive" track on the album. Rhys has described his lyrics as "regurgitating what we hear on the news, recycled, vomiting them all back". The Guardian has interpreted the song as a "cutting critique of middle-east colonialism".

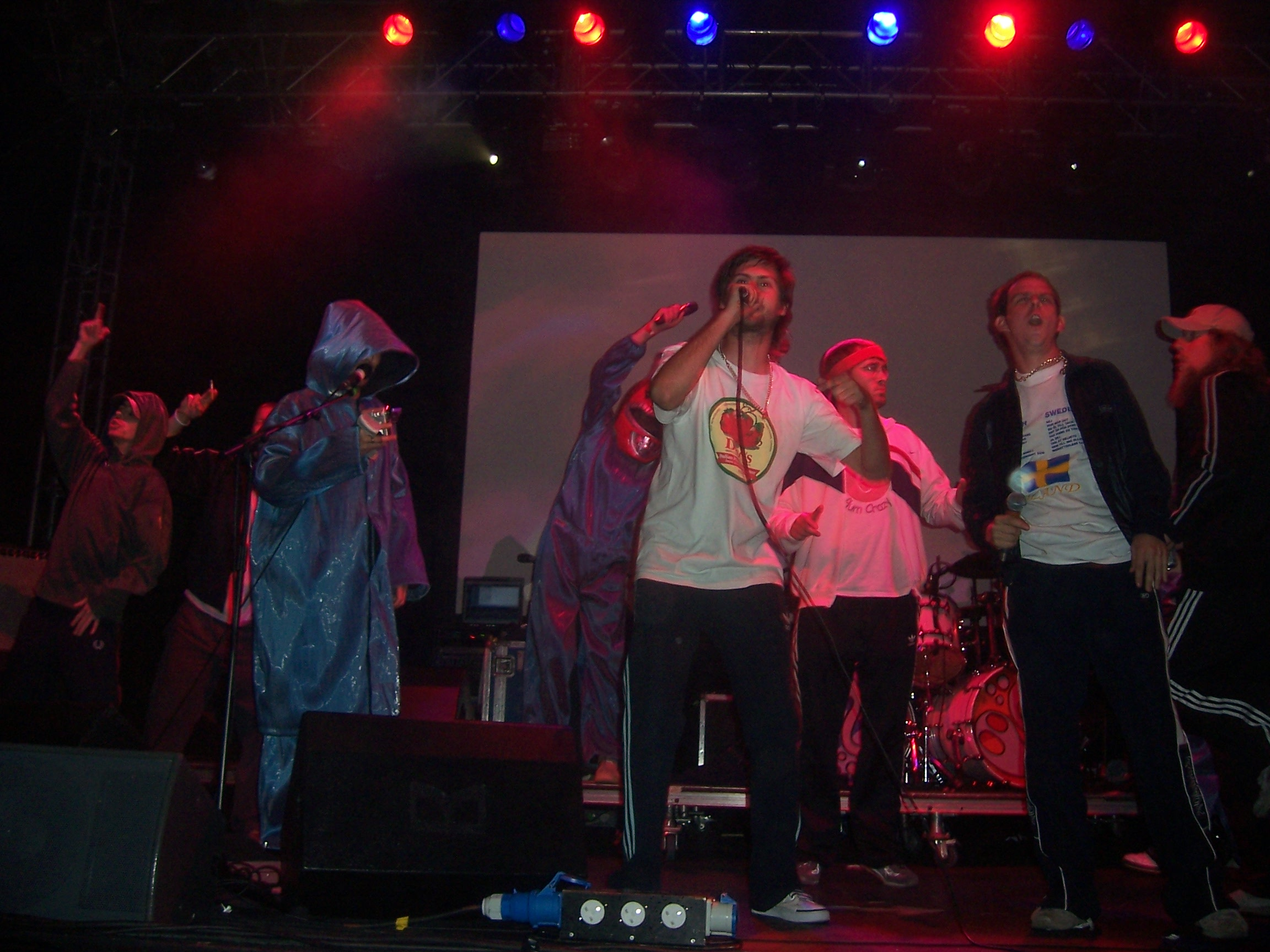
Super Furry Animals and Goldie Lookin Chain performing "Motherfokker" together at the V Festival, 2005.

The track "Motherfokker" is a collaboration between the Super Furry Animals and Welsh rappers Goldie Lookin Chain with chorus vocals provided by Cian Ciaran. The two toured together in 2004 and Gruff Rhys has praised the group, stating that "their range of references are insane. They're extremely bright. They're crazy." Rhys has explained that the song is about "an incredibly large aircraft from outer space. [Goldie Lookin Chain] are the aliens and it's about the people of Earth coming together as one". The two groups have performed the track together several times at Super Furry Animals' concerts including the 2004 Reading Festival and a date at the Brixton Academy on 22 September 2005.

== Release and reception ==
Professional ratings
Review scores
| Source | Rating |
|---|---|
| CokeMachineGlow | (59%) |
| Music Emissions | (favourable) |
| PopMatters | (mixed) |
| Tiny Mix Tapes | 4/5 stars |

The E.P. was released as a free download from the Placid Casual website on 12 April 2004. Along with the three tracks that make up the E.P. the promotional music video for "Slow Life" was also available to download in QuickTime and Windows Media Video formats. Limited quantities of the E.P. were also issued on CD, bundled with initial copies of remix album Phantom Phorce on its release on 19 April 2004. The CD version was housed in a floppy disk style picture sleeve.

Critical reaction was generally mixed with Cokemachineglow calling the EP "forgettable", stating that, while "Slow Life" "slides perfectly off Phantom Power", the other two tracks are weak: "Motherfokker" is a vulgar "Pez candy up the nose" with "shoddy guest rapping" from Goldie Lookin Chain and "Lost Control" is barely more than a remix of Phantom Power track "Out of Control". PopMatters also dismissed "Motherfokker" and "Lost Control" as inessential b-sides and, during their review of 2007's Hey Venus!, the NME suggested that "Motherfokker" is "best-suppressed".

"Slow Life" itself received generally positive reviews; Pitchfork Media called it a "stunning closer" to Phantom Power, while PopMatters described the song as "the kind of schizophrenic fun we've come to expect from the band but ... less showy and eager to please, as they control themselves enough to make the jarring, contradicting styles much easier to digest". Stylus Magazine stated that the "great" track "achieves symbiosis between techno and guitar-pop better than anything else they've done before". The BBC agreed calling "Slow Life" the band's "most successful mindrattling techno attempt so far". The song was placed at number 46 in the 2003 Festive Fifty on John Peel's BBC Radio 1 show.

== Use of "Slow Life" in 9 Songs ==
"Slow Life" is central to the 2004 Michael Winterbottom film 9 Songs, being one of the nine songs mentioned in the title. The movie charts the relationship of main characters Matt and Lisa from their initial meeting to the pair splitting up. Footage of the two attending a series of nine concerts at Brixton Academy, where they initially meet, is interspersed with scenes of the actors performing unsimulated sex. Matt and Lisa are already growing apart when Matt attends a Super Furry Animals concert at the Academy alone. Giving Lisa's ticket away as she "didn't want to go" the character comments: "5000 people in a room and you can still feel alone". The scene appears roughly forty minutes into the film and shows the band performing "Slow Life" live in its entirety as Matt looks on.

== Music video ==
Gruff Rhys in the promotional video for "Slow Life".

A promotional music video was made to accompany "Slow Life" directed by Dylan Jones and Paps O'Maoileoain. The video features psychedelic, fluorescent images of the band's faces in close up as they play and sing along with the track. Strobing and fractal images appear at several points throughout the video. As with the other tracks taken from Phantom Power, "Golden Retriever" and "Hello Sunshine", the video for "Slow Life" does not appear on the Phantom Power DVD release but is included on the DVD version of greatest hits album Songbook: The Singles, Vol. 1.

== Track listing ==
All songs by Super Furry Animals unless otherwise stated.

1. "Slow Life" – 6:59
2. "Motherfokker" (Super Furry Animals/Goldie Lookin Chain) – 5:42
3. "Lost Control" – 4:41

== Credits ==
- Gruff Rhys – vocals
- Huw Bunford – guitar, backing vocals
- Guto Pryce – bass guitar
- Cian Ciaran – keyboards, backing vocals, chorus vocals on "Motherfokker"
- Dafydd Ieuan – drums, backing vocals
- Kris Jenkins – percussion on "Slow Life"
- Marcus Holdway – cello on "Slow Life"
- Sally Herbert – violin on "Slow Life"
- Brian G. Wright – violin on "Slow Life"
- Gill Morley – violin on "Slow Life"
- Ellen Blair – violin on "Slow Life"
- Pete Fowler – Kaoss flanges on "Slow Life"
- Neil McFarland – Kaoss flanges on "Slow Life"
- 2Hats – rap on "Motherfokker"
- Maggot – rap on "Motherfokker"
- Billy Webb – rap on "Motherfokker"
- Eggsy – rap on "Motherfokker"
- Mystikal – rap on "Motherfokker"
- Mike Balls – rap on "Motherfokker"
- Adam Hussain – rap on "Motherfokker"
- Dwain Xain Zedong – rap on "Motherfokker"
