= Hermann Loves Pauline =

"Hermann ♥'s Pauline"

Single by Super Furry Animals

from the album Radiator
- Released: 12 May 1997
- Length: 4:07
- Label: Creation
- Songwriter(s): Super Furry Animals
- Producer(s): Gorwel Owen, Super Furry Animals

Super Furry Animals singles chronology
"The Man Don't Give a Fuck" (1996)	"Hermann ♥'s Pauline" (1997)	"The International Language of Screaming" (1997)

"Hermann ♥'s Pauline" is the sixth single by Super Furry Animals and the first to be released from their second album Radiator. It reached #26 on the UK Singles Chart on its release in May 1997.

Hermann and Pauline are the names of the parents of Albert Einstein, and the song refers to them and the young Albert. The song also mentions Marie Curie and Ernesto Guevara. The song was inspired by the pitstops that the band would take at motorway service stations whilst out on tour, where Gruff Rhys would peruse through bitesized biographies about famous people, such as They Died Too Young book series.

The band had trouble playing the track live and stopped playing it altogether until the Phantom Power tour when they realised that trying to play along to a click track was the cause of the problem.

== Release ==
"Hermann ♥'s Pauline" was released on CD, cassette and 7" on 12 May 1997 and reached number 26 on the UK Singles Chart. The cover art is the first in a series of five Pete Fowler paintings commissioned by the band for Radiator and its singles. Fowler's art was inspired by "Hermann ♥'s Pauline" and features the title characters with their baby, who looks like Albert Einstein. The packaging of the single features the Welsh language quote "Un i rannu, llall i ddewis", which roughly translates into English as "One to share, the other to choose". This quote is a principle taken from the Laws of Hywel Dda which also appears in the lyrics of the album track "Download" from Radiator. "Hermann ♥'s Pauline" was included on the band's 'greatest hits' compilation album Songbook: The Singles, Vol. 1, issued in 2004.

== Track listing ==
All songs by Super Furry Animals.

- CD (CRESCD252)
  1. "Hermann ♥'s Pauline" – 4:07
  2. "Calimero" – 2:23
  3. "Trôns Mr Urdd" – 4:36
- MC (CRECS252), 7" (CRE252)
  1. "Hermann ♥'s Pauline" – 4:07
  2. "Calimero" – 2:23

== Personnel ==
- Gruff Rhys – vocals, guitar, backing vocals
- Huw Bunford – guitar, backing vocals
- Guto Pryce – bass guitar, sub-bass
- Cian Ciaran – synthesizers, backing vocals
- Dafydd Ieuan – drums, percussion, backing vocals

== Singles chart positions ==
Chart (1997)	Peak position
UK Singles Chart	26
