= Demons (Super Furry Animals song) =

Single by Super Furry Animals

from the album Radiator
- Released: 24 November 1997
- Length: 5:13
- Label: Creation Records
- Songwriter: Super Furry Animals
- Producers: Gorwel Owen, Super Furry Animals

Super Furry Animals singles chronology
"Play It Cool" (1997)	"Demons" (1997)	"Northern Lites" (1999)

"Demons" is the fourth and final single from Super Furry Animals' album Radiator. It reached #27 on the UK Singles Chart on its release in November 1997.

== Release and critical reception ==
"Demons" was released on CD, cassette and 7" on 24 November 1997 and reached number 27 on the UK Singles Chart. The cover art is the last in a series of five Pete Fowler paintings commissioned by the band for Radiator and its singles. Fowler's art was inspired by "Demons" and depicts "the unholy tribes of the undead" according to Record Collector. The packaging of the single features the Welsh language quote "Esmwyth! Esmwyth! Dim blewyn o'i le!", which roughly translates into English as "Smooth! Smooth! Not a hair out of place!". It is the last single by the group to contain such a quote, bringing to an end a practice that started with their debut single "Hometown Unicorn". The track was included on the band's 'greatest hits' compilation album Songbook: The Singles, Vol. 1, issued in 2004.

A review in Cherwell called the song a "monumental sound" with "unexplainable vocal harmony" and "fantastically absurd lyrics". In a 2015 article in The Guardian, Danny Wright names Demons as one of the band's 10 best songs, calling it "a sombre yet beautiful anthem" which builds up to "a spine-tingling climax".

== Music video ==
The video was filmed in Colombia. It shows humanist scenes of everyday life, with the band observing and sometimes casually interacting with the locals.

== Cover versions ==
Shy Nobleman performed a cover of the song translated to Hebrew as "Shedim" ( שדים )as part of his 2013 album יומי הוא חלום. Manfred Mann's Earth Band combined the song with Prefab Sprout's song "Dragons" to produce a new song titled "Demons and Dragons".

Accolades

Publication	Country	Accolade	Year	Rank
Hot Press	Ireland	Singles of the year 1997	1997	30
Q	United Kingdom	1010 Songs You Must Own!: Indie - Singles	2004	*

* denotes an unordered list

== Track listing ==
All songs by Super Furry Animals.

- CD (CRESCD283)
1. "Demons" – 5:13
2. "Hit and Run" – 3:31
3. "Carry the Can" – 4:47
- MC (CRES283), 7" poster pack (CRE283)
1. "Demons" – 5:13
2. "Hit and Run" – 3:31

== Personnel ==
- Gruff Rhys – vocals, acoustic guitar
- Huw Bunford – guitar
- Guto Pryce – bass guitar
- Cian Ciaran – keyboards
- Dafydd Ieuan – drums
- Les Morrison - Banjo
- Gorwel Owen - E-bow, samples
- Martin Smith - trumpet

== Singles chart positions ==
Chart (1997)	Peak position
UK Singles Chart	27
