= Hello Sunshine (Super Furry Animals song) =

Single by Super Furry Animals

from the album Phantom Power
- Released: 20 October 2003
- Genre: Alternative rock
- Length: 3:35 (album version); 2:54 (radio edit)
- Label: Epic
- Songwriter: Super Furry Animals
- Producers: Super Furry Animals; Mixed by Mario Caldato Jr. and Super Furry Animals

Super Furry Animals singles chronology
"Golden Retriever" (2003)	"Hello Sunshine" (2003)	"The Man Don't Give a Fuck" (2003)

"Hello Sunshine" is a song by the Welsh band Super Furry Animals from their album Phantom Power. It was the seventeenth single released by the group and reached number 31 on the UK Singles Chart in October 2003.

Several versions of the track were released: the single version omits the short sample of the song "By the Sea" by Wendy and Bonnie which begins the album version, while two remixes, by Weevil and Freiband, appear on the album Phantom Phorce. An animated music video, featuring drawings by regular Super Furries sleeve designer Pete Fowler, was produced to accompany the release of "Hello Sunshine" as a single. The track received mostly positive reviews from critics.

The band turned down "a seven-figure offer" from Coca-Cola to allow the use of "Hello Sunshine" in an advertising campaign citing alleged malpractice on the part of the drinks firm. The group have stated that despite the financial incentives of licensing their songs, they are happy to simply be able to make a living from music.

== Recording and themes ==
The track begins with a sample of the song "By the Sea" by the teenage sibling duo Wendy and Bonnie, from their 1969 album Genesis, which Super Furries singer Gruff Rhys has described as "amazing songs, amazing lyrics and amazing voices". The decision to begin the track with a snippet of "By the Sea" came about due to laziness on the band's part—the track had originally being conceived as a duet but the group "never got around to getting anyone to sing" with them so they "chopped up the Wendy & Bonnie song and stuck it on [as] it's in the same key [and] seemed to make sense". The edit version, issued as a single, does not contain the sample.

"Hello Sunshine" shares the same key, D major, the same guitar tuning, D-A-D-D-A-D, and was written around the same time as several other songs from Phantom Power including the "Father Father" instrumentals, "Golden Retriever", "Cityscape Skybaby" and "Out of Control". The track was recorded at the Super Furry Animals' own studio in Cardiff along with the rest of Phantom Power. Rhys has stated that the song is "a courting ballad with a 'been so down looks like up to me' mentality".

== Musical structure ==
Super Furry Animals "Hello Sunshine" (2003)
Short sample from "Hello Sunshine" illustrating the track's first chorus and bridge.

The album version of "Hello Sunshine" is 3 minutes 35 seconds long and is in the key of D major. The track begins with 43 seconds of the track "By the Sea" from Wendy & Bonnie's 1969 album Genesis featuring sparse fingerstyle guitar and female harmony vocals. The last syllable of the line "...so hard to say goodbye" is held and pans from left to right until "Hello Sunshine" itself begins with Gruff Rhys singing the title phrase, joined by the band on the second word. The first verse follows with simple piano and bass guitar backing Rhys's acoustic guitar to a basic 4/4 beat provided by drummer Dafydd Ieuan. The first chorus enters at 1 minute 13 seconds with Rhys being joined by falsetto harmony backing vocals on the lines "In honesty it's been a while, since we had reason left to smile". The song breaks down for the bridge with just arpeggio guitar, simple bass and occasional drum rolls playing as the lines "Hello sunshine, come into my life" are sung.

Another verse follows featuring the lyrics "I'm a minger, you're a minger too, so come on minger, I want to ming with you" (quoted in many reviews of Phantom Power) before the second chorus. This time the bridge leads, not into another verse, but the song's middle 8 which again sees Rhys backed by multiple falsetto harmony backing vocals. The outro follows during which the title phrase is sung five times before a lead guitar line heralds the end of the song with Rhys singing "Come into my life".

=== Alternative versions ===
Super Furry Animals "Hello Sunshine (Freiband remix)" (2004)
Short sample from the Freiband remix of "Hello Sunshine" illustrating the tracks "utterly minimal" style.

A radio edit of "Hello Sunshine" was issued to radio stations and was also used in the music video. This version of the track is 2 minutes and 54 seconds long and omits the opening extract from "By the Sea". The rest of song is identical to the album version.

Two remixes were included on the DVD version of Phantom Power and the album Phantom Phorce. The first, by Weevil, is 4 minutes 22 seconds in length and is largely based around samples of lead guitar from the track along with occasional snippets of Rhys's vocal. Samples of Ieuan's drums are also used in the second half of the song. The track ends with a brief clip of the band's road manager, in the guise of 'Kurt Stern', giving a fictionalised account of Phantom Power's production. The second remix, by Freiband, is 10 minutes 31 seconds long, is "utterly minimal" and barely resembles the original with no recognisable vocal or musical samples from the album or radio versions.

== Critical response ==
"Hello Sunshine" received generally positive reviews with musicOMH calling it "one of the best tracks from … Phantom Power", and Rolling Stone describing it as a "gorgeous opening track". The 'summery' nature of the track was commented on by several journalists with The Observer calling "Hello Sunshine" a "gloriously hazy opener" and Music Critic describing it as "passionately mellow summer doo-wop". However BBC Wales, although describing the track as "an excellent song and a near perfect album opener", called the decision to release "Hello Sunshine" as a single "rather mystifying" stating that it is "a world away from the SFA we've grown to love over the years". The song was featured on the soundtrack of the 2006 film Snow Cake and also appeared in "The Heartbreak", an episode of The O.C.

== Coca-Cola controversy ==
According to a Gruff Rhys interview with Red Pepper magazine, the band turned down "a seven-figure offer by an advertising agency" for the use of "Hello Sunshine" in a Coca-Cola commercial due to alleged malpractice:

We have never been a big selling band, but when it came to the crunch, we felt we couldn't justify endorsing a product that may have had a part in violently suppressing some of its workers. For a moment, sitting in the Sinaltrainal office, I thought that we could have done the advert and donated the money for their campaign for justice. Yet the thought of having to hear our song used to sell anything that exploits anyone for the worse turns my stomach.

The band ultimately allowed the track to be used in a short film about human rights abuses by anti-poverty charity War on Want. The charity has frequently criticized the Coca-Cola company's impact on local communities. In late 2005 Rhys reiterated that, although licensing one of their tracks for use in advertising would make a big difference financially, the Super Furries are happy to simply be able to make a living from making music. Rhys went on to state that a "Red Stripe advert in Jamaica" is one of the few advertising opportunities the band could live with.

== Music video ==
A screenshot from the music video showing cartoon representations of the Super Furry Animals being confronted by the 'Hello Sunshine' horse.

An animated music video was produced for "Hello Sunshine", directed by Pete Fowler, Neil McFarland and Passion Pictures and featuring Fowler's cartoon drawings.

The video begins with the sun rising over a country landscape. A small, blue, 'Hello Sunshine' winged horse flies across the sky and is watched by a man holding a 1:16 scale model kit for the same horse. The picture of the horse on the box flies away as he looks at it and lands on one of five hot air balloons flown by cartoon representations of the Super Furry Animals. The video cuts to a brief shot of a man staring through a shop window at an advertising display featuring models of the 'Hello Sunshine' horse before we see Gruff Rhys coming across a huge statue of the same horse in his car. The next shot shows the 'Hello Sunshine' horse forming part of a stained glass window in a place of worship as a priest urges his followers (all dressed in dark blue with a gold pendant of the 'Hello Sunshine' horse around their necks) to help him cause two rockets at either side of him to rise into the air and explode in the clouds. These rockets cause a thunder storm. The resultant lightning strikes a 'Hello Sunshine' horse as it flies through the air and a duplicate horse is created. This happens repeatedly until the sky is full of small horses which fly out of the storm and towards the Super Furries' hot air balloons. The last section shows the band playing "Hello Sunshine" and being confronted by the 'Hello Sunshine' horse who Rhys strokes on the nose. The video appears on the DVD release of the band's greatest hits album Songbook: The Singles, Vol. 1.

== Track listing ==
All songs by Super Furry Animals.

- Digipak CD (674360 2)
1. "Hello Sunshine (Radio Edit)" – 2:54
2. "Cowbird" – 5:41
3. "Sanitizzzed" – 2:45
- 7" (674360 7)
1. "Hello Sunshine (Radio Edit)" – 2:54
2. "Cowbird" – 5:41
- DVD (674360 9)
1. "Hello Sunshine (Video)"* – 3:34
2. "Cowbird" – 5:41
3. "Sanitizzzed" – 2:45

*The "Hello Sunshine" video features the radio edit of the track. A brief preliminary video featuring animal noises means that the run time matches that of the album version.

== Personnel ==
- Gruff Rhys – vocals
- Huw Bunford – guitar
- Guto Pryce – bass guitar
- Cian Ciaran – keyboards
- Dafydd Ieuan – drums
- Kris Jenkins – percussion

== Charts ==
Chart	Peak position
UK Singles Chart	31
