= Love Kraft =

Studio album by Super Furry Animals
- Released: 22 August 2005
- Studios: Musiclan studios, Figueres, Spain; Pleasure Foxxx, Cardiff; The Dairy, Brixton; Stir Studios, Cardiff
- Genre: Indie rock
- Length: 54:20
- Label: Epic
- Producers: Mario Caldato Jr, Super Furry Animals

Super Furry Animals chronology
Songbook: The Singles, Vol. 1 (2004)	Love Kraft (2005)	Hey Venus! (2007)

Singles from Love Kraft
- 1. "Lazer Beam" Released: 15 August 2005

Love Kraft is the seventh studio album by Welsh indie rock band Super Furry Animals, released on 22 August 2005 through Epic Records in the United Kingdom. The album was recorded in Spain with producer Mario Caldato Jr and was something of a departure for the band, with all members contributing songs and lead vocals alongside Gruff Rhys who had been main songwriter for the Super Furries until this point. In selecting tracks for Love Kraft a conscious effort was made by the band not to choose songs on their individual merit but rather to pick those which went well together in order to create as cohesive an album as possible. The album's name was taken from a sex shop, Love Craft, near the Cardiff offices of the Super Furries' management team and is also a nod to American horror writer H. P. Lovecraft.

Critical response was generally positive with some reviews claiming the album was the best of the group's career. However, a few reviewers expressed reservations that Love Kraft was "merely a very good Super Furry Animals effort" and was not as impressive as the band's previous records. The track "Lazer Beam" was released as a single and reached #28 in the UK Singles Chart.

== Recording ==
Love Kraft was recorded in Figueres, a small city in Catalonia, Spain. According to Rhys the band found themselves in the "unusual" position of recording their seventh album together and began to look at groups who had made many records, such as Fleetwood Mac and The Beach Boys. These bands had made "foreign records" (Tusk and Holland, respectively) so the Super Furries decided to do the same although on "a much tighter budget." Leaving their usual Cardiff studio behind had an effect on the songs according to Rhys:

"It was recorded last June in intense heat. We're not used to heat at all, so it's a very slow album. We call it our sludge-rock album".

The band did a lot of experimenting and arranging in Cardiff before going into the studio, as a result of which Love Kraft was recorded in just three weeks. Drummer Dafydd Ieuan also attributes the album sessions' speedy conclusion to producer Mario Caldato Jr. who was very good at keeping the group together and on the right track.

Super Furry Animals "Zoom!" (2005)
Short sample from "Zoom!", the album's first track. The clip illustrates the band's use of found sounds on Love Kraft, in this case a sample of Huw Bunford jumping into a swimming pool.

Super Furry Animals "Cloudberries" (2005)
Short sample from "Cloudberries". An Observer review of "Love Kraft" describes the track as exhibiting "hymnal solemnity" and the clip illustrates the "slow" nature of the album as described by Gruff Rhys in an interview with The Guardian. Towards the middle of the clip the tracks mid-section plays—"the only moment at which any Latin flavour seeps into Love Kraft".

The album represented a departure from the band's previous working methods: although all five members had always contributed to the development of the songs, Gruff Rhys had been the main songwriter. On Love Kraft this was no longer the case, as Rhys, Huw Bunford, Dafydd Ieuan and Cian Ciaran all contributed songs and lead vocals. The group also abandoned their usual practise of picking songs on their individual merit, instead choosing tracks that would work well together and "create a sound that was as cohesive as possible". Of the "30-40" songs written by band members the group chose "the more introspective ones" which meant that some of Rhys's tracks were left off the album as they were "energetic and poppy" and "didn't really fit in with everybody else's work".

Several 'found sounds' were recorded and used on the album including the buzzing of a Brazilian electrical substation, the sound of pool balls being rubbed against each other and a recording of Huw Bunford jumping into a swimming pool. The latter opens the album, preceding the intro to "Zoom!".

Love Kraft was mixed in a suburb of Rio de Janeiro at the request of Brazilian born Caldato. According to Rhys the band toyed with the idea of using Latin musical elements and had fantasies of "Marcos Valle doing backing vocals, and getting Rogerio Duprat to arrange the strings" but ultimately thought it would be a "bit too embarrassing" and actively tried not to make a "Brazilian sounding" record. This point was echoed by Guto Pryce in an interview with Birmingham's Metro although he conceded that "in Rio music is everywhere. The beats and rhythms are non-stop so that probably seeped into our minds as a subconscious influence."

The album is named after a sex shop, Lovecraft Limited, near the Ankst Management offices on Cowbridge Road, Cardiff and is also a reference to American horror writer H. P. Lovecraft. In a 2005 interview with The Daily Telegraph, Gruff Rhys explained that the name also stems from the fact that the record has "a general warm glow of love" and that it was originally conceived as a "love record" before "some of the lyrics went completely off the rails".

== Release ==
Love Kraft was released on CD, SACD, vinyl and as a digital download on 22 August 2005 in the United Kingdom and was the band's last release for Sony's Epic imprint before they moved to independent label Rough Trade. The album reached #19 in the UK Albums Chart. In America the album was released on 13 September 2005 by Beggars Banquet US. "Lazer Beam" was the only track to be released as a single from the album, reaching #28 in the UK Singles Chart.

Region	Date	Label	Format	Catalogue
Japan	24 August 2005	Epic Records Japan	Compact disc	EICP-546
United Kingdom	22 August 2005	Epic	Vinyl record	5205011
United Kingdom	22 August 2005	Epic	Compact disc	5205012
United Kingdom	22 August 2005	Epic	Super Audio CD	5205016
United Kingdom	22 August 2005	Epic	Download	—
United States	13 September 2005	XL Recordings/Beggars Banquet US	Vinyl record	?
United States	13 September 2005	XL Recordings/Beggars Banquet US	Compact disc	85047
United States	13 September 2005	XL Recordings/Beggars Banquet US	Download	—

== Critical response ==
Professional ratings
Aggregate scores
Source	Rating
Metacritic	77/100
Review scores
Source	Rating
AllMusic	3.5/5 stars
The Guardian	5/5 stars
NME	8/10
The Observer	4/5 stars
Paste	4/5 stars
Pitchfork	8.5/10
PopMatters	7/10
Rolling Stone	3/5 stars
Uncut	4.5/5 stars
Under the Radar	9/10

The album received a generally positive reaction from critics. British newspaper The Guardian described Love Kraft as the band's "best album yet" and musicOMH claimed it to be "the greatest realisation of the Super Furry vision to date". Uncut was similarly impressed calling the album "perhaps the defining record of [the band's] career" while Yahoo Music UK thought Love Kraft was "perfect pop".

The NME had reservations however, stating that although the album is "easily as engaging and full of the wild possibilities of pop music as anything else in their peerless canon" it is "not quite up there with Radiator due to its brace of shonky ballad filler ("Cloudberries" and "Cabin Fever")". Writing for AllMusic, Stephen Thomas Erlewine was largely impressed with Love Kraft but admitted to being disappointed that it is "merely a very good Super Furry Animals effort, with few surprises outside of its alluring sleek". The band's singer, Gruff Rhys, has described the album as "the most beautiful record we've made ... really orchestral and fairly timeless".

=== Accolades ===
Publication	Country	Accolade	Year	Rank
Iguana Music	Spain	Best albums 2005	2005	62
NME	United Kingdom	Albums of 2005	2005	26
Uncut	United Kingdom	Uncut 50 best albums of 2005	2005	12
Uncut	United Kingdom	Uncut's 150 greatest albums of the 2000s	2009	118
The Village Voice	United States	Pazz & Jop Albums of 2005	2005	339

== Tour ==
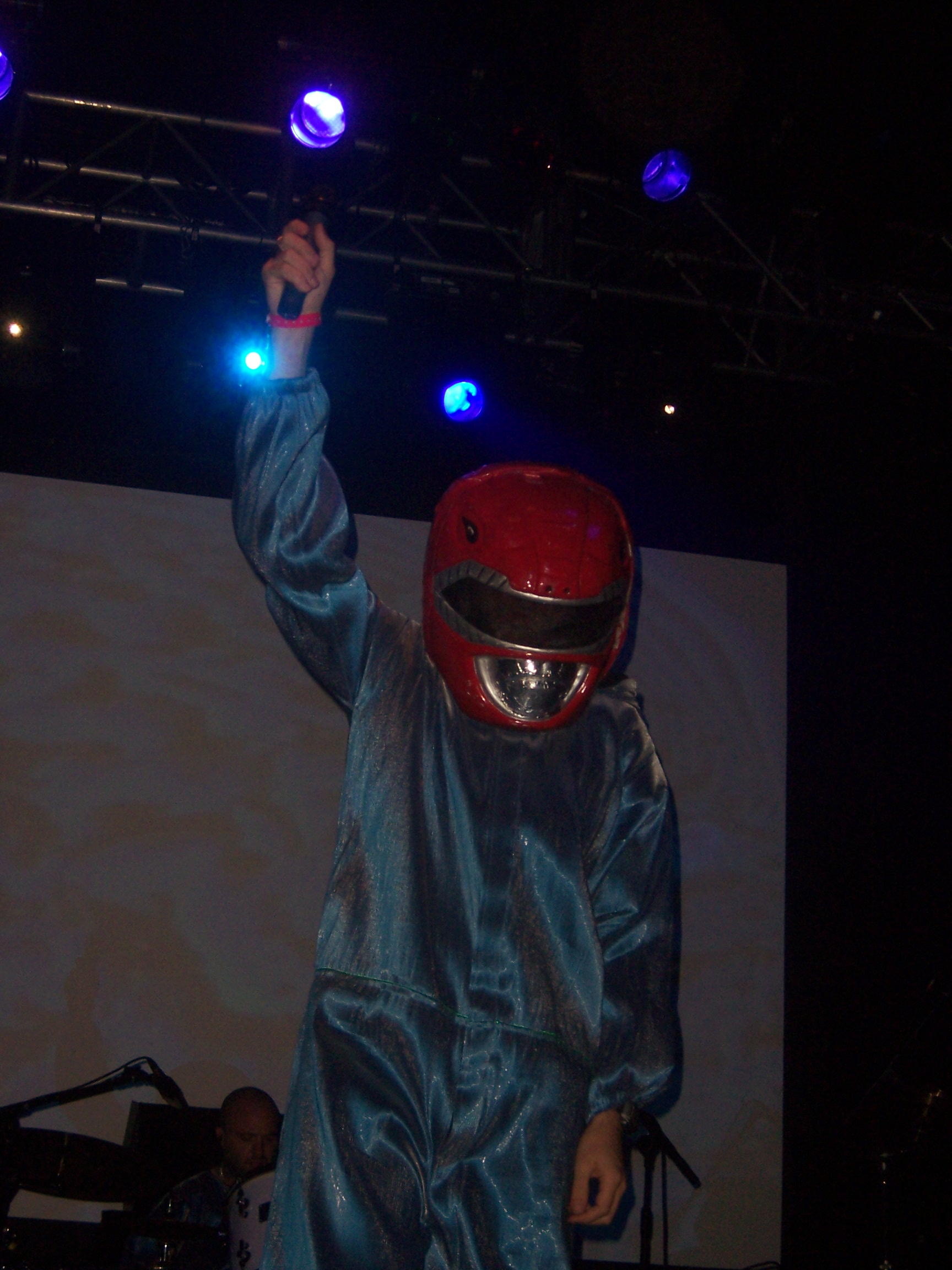
Super Furry Animals performing live at the V Festival, 2005 in support of Love Kraft.

The Super Furry Animals played numerous festivals in Great Britain prior to Love Kraft's release including Scotland's T in the Park, Oxegen, the Secret Garden Party in Cambridge and the V Festival, warming up for these dates with a small show at Barry Memorial Hall on 22 July 2005. A gig at Somerset House in London on 8 July 2005 went ahead despite coming just one day after the 7/7 bombings caused Queens of the Stone Age to cancel their show at the venue.

Following the release of Love Kraft in the United Kingdom the Super Furry Animals played Bestival on the Isle of Wight before embarking on an 11 date tour of the UK and Ireland, beginning at the University of East Anglia in Norwich on 14 September 2005 and ending on 27 September at Dublin's Olympia Theatre venue. A month long tour of Canada and the United States followed, starting on 1 November in Montreal and ending in San Diego on 1 December.

The band experienced a "very different atmosphere" at initial shows on the Love Kraft tour, when they played the "slow" songs from the album. This contributed to their decision to make follow up Hey Venus! a "rowdy pop record".

== Track listing ==
All tracks are written by Super Furry Animals.

No.	Title	Lead vocals	Length
1.	"Zoom!"	Gruff Rhys	6:53
2.	"Atomik Lust"	Dafydd Ieuan	4:53
3.	"The Horn"	Huw Bunford	3:00
4.	"Ohio Heat"	Rhys	4:06
5.	"Walk You Home"	Cian Ciaran	4:00
6.	"Lazer Beam"	Rhys	4:55
7.	"Frequency"	Rhys	4:40
8.	"Oi Frango"		2:23
9.	"Psyclone!"	Rhys	4:20
10.	"Back on a Roll"	Bunford	3:46
11.	"Cloudberries"	Rhys	5:04
12.	"Cabin Fever"	Ciaran/Ieuan	6:20

Japanese CD release bonus tracks
No.	Title	Length
13.	"Sunny Seville"	3:26
14.	"Colonise the Moon"	4:34

== Personnel ==
The following people contributed to Love Kraft:

=== Band ===
- Gruff Rhys – vocals, guitar, harmonica
- Huw Bunford – guitar, backing vocals, lead vocals on "The Horn" and "Back on a Roll"
- Guto Pryce – bass guitar
- Cian Ciaran – keyboards, backing vocals, lead vocals on "Walk You Home" and "Cabin Fever"
- Dafydd Ieuan – drums, backing vocals, lead vocals on "Atomik Lust" and "Cabin Fever"

=== Additional musicians ===
- Kris Jenkins – percussion
- Nadia Griffiths – female vocal on "Walk You Home"
- Debi McLean – space vocal on "Lazer Beam"
- Jonathan Thomas – slide guitar on "Back on a Roll"
- Jordi – finger cymbals, handclaps
- Côr CF1 – Choir
- David Ralicke – flute
- Sarah Clarke – bass clarinet
- Tracy Holloway – trombone
- Jeff Daly – baritone saxophone
- Matthew Draper – cor anglais
- Marcus Holloway – cello
- Clare Raybould – violin
- Brian Wright – violin
- Elspeth Cowey – violin
- Ellen Blair – violin
- Amanda Britton – violin
- Sally Herbert – violin
- Laura Melhuish – violin
- Gill Morley – violin
- Jacqueline Norrie – violin
- Will Morris Jones – choral arrangements
- Osian Gwynedd – choral arrangements
- Sean O'Hagan – choral, string and wind arrangements
- Super Furry Animals – string and wind arrangements

=== Recording personnel ===
- Mario Caldato Jr. – production, mixing, engineering
- Super Furry Animals – production, mixing, surround sound mix
- Richard Jackson – engineering (Stir Studios)
- Greg Jackman – engineering (The Dairy)
- Jordi – recording assistant (Musiclan)
- Jordan – recording assistant (Musiclan)
- Luizao Dantas – recording assistant (AR Studios)
- Leo Moreira – recording assistant (AR Studios)
- Sam Wetmore – surround sound mix

=== Artwork ===
- Pete Fowler – artwork
- Mark James – artwork
- Alexis West – photography
- Leon West – photography

== Album chart positions ==
Chart	Peak position
Ireland Albums Chart	23
U.S. Top Heatseekers	38
U.S. Top Independent Albums	47
UK Albums Chart	19
