= The International Language of Screaming =

Single by Super Furry Animals

from the album Radiator
- Released: 14 July 1997
- Length: 2:12
- Label: Creation Records
- Songwriter(s): Super Furry Animals
- Producer(s): Gorwel Owen, Super Furry Animals

Super Furry Animals singles chronology
"Hermann ♥'s Pauline" (1997)	"The International Language of Screaming" (1997)	"Play It Cool" (1997)

"The International Language of Screaming" is the second single from Super Furry Animals' album Radiator. It reached #24 on the UK Singles Chart on its release in July 1997.

== Release and critical reception ==
"The International Language of Screaming" was released on CD, cassette and 7" on 14 July 1997 and reached number 24 on the UK Singles Chart. The cover art is the second in a series of five Pete Fowler paintings commissioned by the band for Radiator and its singles. Fowler's art was inspired by "The International Language of Screaming" and features "refugees from Star Trek" according to Record Collector. The packaging of the single features the Welsh language quote "Teg edrych tuag adref", which roughly translates into English as "Home sweet home". The track was included on the band's 'greatest hits' compilation album Songbook: The Singles, Vol. 1, issued in 2004.

"The International Language of Screaming" received a generally positive response from critics. Reviewing the track on its release as a single, the NME called it a "spindly burst of brevity" and suggested that it was inspired by the music of the band Soft Machine. The magazine went on to state, however, that the track is not as focused as "The Man Don't Give a Fuck" or as "quirkily charming" as "Hermann ♥'s Pauline" and that its "sonic doodling" may only make sense in the context of the then yet to be released album Radiator.

== Track listing ==
All songs by Super Furry Animals.

- CD (CRESCD269)
  1. "The International Language of Screaming" – 2:12
  2. "Wrap It Up" – 3:27
  3. "Foxy Music" – 3:49
  4. "nO.K." – 2:12
- MC (CRES269), 7" (CRE269)
  1. "The International Language of Screaming" – 2:12
  2. "Wrap It Up" – 3:27

== Personnel ==
- Gruff Rhys – vocals
- Huw Bunford – guitar
- Guto Pryce – bass guitar
- Cian Ciaran – keyboards
- Dafydd Ieuan – drums

== Singles chart positions ==
Chart (1997)	Peak position
UK Singles Chart	24
