= Play It Cool (song) =

Single by Super Furry Animals

from the album Radiator
- Released: 22 September 1997
- Length: 3:18
- Label: Creation Records
- Songwriter: Super Furry Animals
- Producers: Gorwel Owen, Super Furry Animals

Super Furry Animals singles chronology
"The International Language of Screaming" (1997)	"Play It Cool" (1997)	"Demons" (1997)

"Play It Cool" is the third single from Super Furry Animals' album Radiator. It reached number 27 on the UK Singles Chart on its release in September 1997.

== Release and critical reception ==
"Play It Cool" was released on CD, cassette and 7" on 22 September 1997 and reached number 27 on the UK Singles Chart It is a slightly different version from the one originally featured on their album Radiator, and the single mix has been substituted on later reissues of the album. The cover art is the fourth in a series of five Pete Fowler paintings commissioned by the band for Radiator and its singles. Fowler's art was inspired by "Play It Cool" and features a "mutant blue dog" according to Record Collector. The packaging of the single features the Welsh language quote "Adar o'r unlliw hedfant i'r unlle", which roughly translates into English as "Birds of a feather flock together". The track was included on the band's 'greatest hits' compilation album Songbook: The Singles, Vol. 1, issued in 2004.

Accolades

Publication	Country	Accolade	Year	Rank
Select	United Kingdom	Singles of 1997	1997	15

== Music video ==
A music video was produced to accompany "Play It Cool" featuring digitised versions of the band beating Brazil in the PlayStation video game Actua Soccer 2.

== Track listing ==
All songs by Super Furry Animals.

- CD (CRESCD275)
1. "Play It Cool" – 3:18
2. "Pass the Time" – 3:49
3. "Cryndod Yn Dy Lais" – 3:15
- MC (CRECS275), 7" poster pack (CRE275)
1. "Play It Cool" – 3:18
2. "Pass the Time" – 3:49

== Personnel ==
- Gruff Rhys – vocals
- Huw Bunford – guitar
- Guto Pryce – bass guitar
- Cian Ciaran – keyboards
- Dafydd Ieuan – drums

== Chart positions ==
Chart (1997)	Peak position
UK Singles Chart	27
