= Golden Retriever (song) =

Single by Super Furry Animals

from the album Phantom Power
- Released: 14 July 2003
- Genre: Alternative rock, glam rock
- Length: 2:28
- Label: Epic
- Songwriter: Super Furry Animals
- Producers: Super Furry Animals; Mixed by Mario Caldato Jr. and Super Furry Animals

Super Furry Animals singles chronology
"It's Not the End of the World?" (2002)	"Golden Retriever" (2003)	"Hello Sunshine" (2003)

"Golden Retriever" is a song by Super Furry Animals. It was the first single to be issued from the album Phantom Power and reached number 13 on the UK Singles Chart on its release in July 2003. The song is about the relationship between singer Gruff Rhys's girlfriend's two dogs and was written in the same key, with the same guitar tuning and around the same time as several other songs from Phantom Power.

Critical reaction to the track was generally positive with many reviewers commenting on its "catchiness" and "glam rock" style. A Jake & Jim directed music video was produced to accompany the song's release as a single featuring the band dressed as yetis. A Killa Kela remix of "Golden Retriever" appears on the album Phantom Phorce and the DVD release of Phantom Power.

== Recording and themes ==
"Golden Retriever" is about "the relationship between [Gruff Rhys's] girlfriend's two dogs – a male and a female". Rhys has stated that the "road sign and driving theory vocabulary" that he had to absorb when he passed his driving test a few years before he wrote "Golden Retriever" found its way into the song's lyrics which are a parody of the blues. The song shares the same key, D major, the same guitar tuning, D–A–D–D–A–D, and was written around the same time as several other songs from Phantom Power including the "Father Father" instrumentals, "Hello Sunshine", "Cityscape Skybaby" and "Out of Control". "Golden Retriever" was recorded at the Super Furry Animals' own studio in Cardiff along with the rest of Phantom Power.

== Musical style ==
Super Furry Animals "Golden Retriever" (2003)
Short sample from "Golden Retriever" featuring the track's intro, first verse and chorus. The clip illustrates the build up from the acoustic guitar intro to the three note fuzz pedal riff played during the verse and finally the distorted electric guitar playing chords during the chorus.

"Golden Retriever" is 2 minutes 28 seconds long and is in the key of D major. The track begins with a descending riff on acoustic guitar before the band joins on 2 seconds with an electric guitar playing a three note riff (D, F and G) through a fuzz pedal. The first verse follows on 9 seconds with Gruff Rhys singing about meeting The Devil at a roundabout. The first chorus enters at 24 seconds with Rhys being joined by falsetto harmony backing vocals and a distorted electric guitar playing chords rather than single notes. A breakdown verse follows, leading into the extended second chorus which features shouted backing vocals chanting the song's title. The outro begins at 1 minute 55 seconds, with lead guitar lines and heavy drums, featuring flanging, bringing the track to a climax.

=== Alternative version ===
Super Furry Animals "Golden Retriever (Killa Kela remix)" (2004)
Short sample from the Killa Kela remix of "Golden Retriever" illustrating Kela beatboxing alongside Rhys's lead vocal.

A Killa Kela remix of "Golden Retriever" is included on the DVD version of Phantom Power and the album Phantom Phorce. Largely dispensing with the track's instrumental backing (apart from distant bass and occasional acoustic guitar) the remix features Kela's beatboxing alongside Rhys's lead vocal and follows the arrangement of the original. The track is 2 minutes 33 seconds long and ends with a brief clip of the band's road manager, in the guise of 'Kurt Stern', lamenting the fact that this "perfect rocking track" is simply about a dog.

== Critical reception ==
Reception to "Golden Retriever" was generally positive and many reviewers commented on the track's glam rock style—PopMatters described the track as "a fun blast of glam rock", the NME called it "an irresistibly catchy ... glam stomper", and The Guardian stated that the "unhinged glammy romp" cannot be faulted. The track was also described as being a parody of Robert Johnson type blues by Entertainment Weekly and a "brilliantly catchy anthem" by Angry Ape. Several critics noted the "goofy" and "silly" nature of the song, with comparisons made between "Golden Retriever" and both the Doctor Who theme music and The KLF's "Doctorin' the Tardis". Some criticism was leveled at the song for being "too Radio 1 friendly" and for simply being "more of the same" from the band. In a 2006 feature on the Super Furry Animals' back catalogue Incendiary Magazine went as far as to call the track "hogwash".

=== Accolades ===
Publication	Country	Accolade	Year	Rank
NME	United Kingdom	Singles of 2003	2003	20

== Music video ==
The Super Furry Animals dress as yetis during the promotional video for "Golden Retriever".

The music video was directed by Jake & Jim and grew from an idea the band had to record a video in Iceland at the start of 2003 which didn't come off. The video begins with a close up of a cardboard box featuring a logo of two apples with the title 'Golden'. The band is shown playing along to "Golden Retriever" inside the box with Gruff Rhys wearing a red sports visor. Bassist Guto Pryce and keyboardist Cian Ciaran are both sat on settees with guitars on their laps which they are not playing. As the chorus begins the band transform into yetis and all begin playing "Golden Retriever", several members headbanging in time with the track. The group wear their regular clothes for the second verse before the yeti costumes reappear for the second chorus. As the video ends the camera zooms out to show a Golden Retriever approach the box in an alleyway. The Super Furries raise their hands in the air and look up at the dog who then urinates on the box and runs away.

In an interview with BBC Manchester, drummer Dafydd Ieuan stated that, although he finds the video fun to watch, it was hard work to make because the yeti costumes were very heavy and incredibly hot. The band took the suits on tour with them but only wore them for "the last two minutes" of concerts because they were so warm. The video appears on the DVD release of the band's greatest hits album Songbook: The Singles, Vol. 1.

== Single track listing ==
All songs by Super Furry Animals.

- Digipak CD (6739062), 7" (6739067)
  1. "Golden Retriever" – 2:28
  2. "Summer Snow" – 2:30
  3. "Blue Fruit" – 4:43
- DVD (6739069)
  1. "Golden Retriever (Video)" – 2:28
  2. "Summer Snow" – 2:30
  3. "Blue Fruit" – 4:43

== Personnel ==
- Gruff Rhys – vocals
- Huw Bunford – guitar
- Guto Pryce – bass guitar
- Cian Ciaran – keyboards
- Dafydd Ieuan – drums
- Rachel Thomas – backing vocals

== Singles chart positions ==
Chart	Peak position
Ireland Singles Chart	38
UK Singles Chart	13
