= Lazer Beam =

Single by Super Furry Animals

from the album Love Kraft
- Released: 15 August 2005
- Genre: Alternative rock, indie rock, funk
- Length: 4:55 (Album version); 3:36 (Radio edit)
- Label: Epic
- Songwriter: Super Furry Animals
- Producers: Mario Caldato Jr, Super Furry Animals

Super Furry Animals singles chronology
"The Man Don't Give a Fuck" (2003)	"Lazer Beam" (2005)	"Show Your Hand" (2007)

"Lazer Beam" is a single by the Welsh rock band Super Furry Animals. It was the only single to be released from the Love Kraft album and reached number 28 in the UK Singles Chart, and as of 2023, remains their last UK Top 40 hit. The song is "about making your own reality" and tells the story of aliens coming down to earth to shoot humans with laser beams which "make them intelligent rather than being jerks". Some of singer Gruff Rhys's lyrics were lifted from a speech made by Tony Blair at the Labour Party Conference in 2004.

Although critical response to the track was mostly positive, with some journalists hailing "Lazer Beam" as a "return to form", some reviews were scathing with the NME even going so far as to call it "the worst Furries song ever" in their review of 2007's Hey Venus!

Two music videos were produced to accompany the song's release as a single. The first, directed by Palumbo & Coch, features a fluorescent cityscape with the band and a monster with their 'SFA' logo, appearing between the translucent buildings while the second, directed by Aurelien and Florian Marrel, features a fictional sideways-scrolling arcade beat 'em up in the style of Metal Slug and Michael Jackson's Moonwalker.

== Recording and themes ==
In a 2005 interview with The Big Issue Gruff Rhys claimed that some of the lyrics to the song are based on Tony Blair's speech at the Labour Party Conference in 2004, in particular his opening line 'a radical new vision is needed': "I've nicked that wholesale, but I am offering a radical new vision whereas he wasn't. He was offering a 19th century imperialist vision and "Lazer Beam" offers an end to Hollywood romantic comedies and imperial colonialist bastards". According to guitarist Huw Bunford the song is "about making your own reality": "Today's reality is insane so we may as well make our own. It's about aliens coming down from space and zapping humans with amazing lazer beams that make them intelligent rather than being jerks. It's obviously a highly unlikely scenario".

"Lazer Beam" was recorded in Figueres, Spain, and mixed in a suburb of Rio de Janeiro along with the rest of the Love Kraft album. Elements of the song's backing track were built from a rough demo the band had begun working on during the recording of Guerrilla called "John Spex", which was brought up again for the Rings Around the World sessions. According to Bunford, the band recorded "three versions of the song" before settling on the version that appears on Love Kraft.

== Musical structure ==
Super Furry Animals "Lazer Beam" (2005)
Short sample from "Lazer Beam" illustrating the track's first verse and chorus.

The album version of "Lazer Beam" is 4 minutes 55 seconds long and is in the key of A major. This version appeared on all commercially released singles containing the track.

The track starts with 24 seconds of heavily effected guitar, drums and "bizarre sound effects" before the first verse begins, rising in volume as a looping bass line joins the mix and Gruff Rhys speaks the lines "This song is daunted by a radical new vision, no more imperial colonial bastards, no more romantic comedies, this is a fanfare introduction to a high-powered, purposeful theme."

A string section join on the chorus as Rhys's voice is augmented by falsetto harmony backing vocals. The chords for the chorus remain the same as those used in the verse, namely A and G. The song then breaks down to a lead guitar melody line at 1 minute and 8 seconds before another verse with Rhys this time singing his lyrics. Another chorus, verse and chorus follow in this fashion until "Lazer Beam" breaks down completely at 2:55 to keyboard swells with Debi McLean providing a "space vocal", speaking the lines "we will conquer utopia in space chariots". The song builds back up to a double chorus before the outro. The string section returns once Rhys has sung a final verse using a vocoder. "Lazer Beam" then breaks down for the last time to handclaps and keyboard swells and ends with a few seconds of isolated keyboard noise.

=== Radio edit ===
A radio edit of "Lazer Beam" was included on promotional cds sent to radio stations and was also used in both music videos. This version of the track is 3 minutes and 36 seconds long and omits both the 24 second introduction, first, spoken word verse and the first chorus, starting instead with the guitar melody line that occurs in the album version at 1 minute and 8 seconds. The rest of song is identical to the album version although it does not include the brief keyboard noises at the very end.

== Critical reception ==
Reaction to the track was generally positive with several critics hailing "Lazer Beam" as a "return to form" including BBC Wales who claimed the track was "SFA's best single release since 2001's "Juxtapozed with U"". musicOMH thought "Lazer Beam" to be an "absolute powerhouse of a song" and the Sunday Herald saw the track as one of the few "great moments on Love Kraft".

However, Cokemachineglow described the song as "one of [the band's] weakest singles to date":

An electronic mish-mash with a forgettable verse and shouted gibberish chorus, it might actually be annoying, a quality I would never otherwise associate with Super Furry Animals singles. It's also completely out of step with the mood of the album, and practically screams First Single! as a result.

Two years after the song's release the NME described "Lazer Beam" as "the worst Furries song ever" in their review of the band's eighth album Hey Venus!.

The "psychedelic" nature of the track was commented on by several reviewers with Mojo describing it as "acid-carnivalesque", The Times stating that it is a "kids TV theme heard through an acid-pop filter", The Observer claiming it sounded like "a Jesus Christ Superstar outtake gone delightfully right", and BBC Wales calling it "cosmic funk".

== Music videos ==
Two music videos were produced to accompany the release of "Lazer Beam" as a single. Both feature the radio edit of the track

=== Palumbo & Coch video ===
A screenshot from the Palumbo & Coch music video showing Gruff Rhys singing from an electronic billboard in front of a computer generated cityscape

The "Tron-inspired" Palumbo & Coch directed video starts with the camera rushing across a fluorescent blue sea, then a road towards "a cityscape which looks like something between downtown Tokyo and a graphic equalizer". Gruff Rhys appears on a floating electronic billboard singing the first verse and is joined by other members of the band playing along with the track.

At 33 seconds a neon monster, with the 'SFA' logo on his chest, appears amongst the translucent buildings. More shots of the band and the computer generated city follow before the monster reappears during the second chorus, this time with electric bolts shooting from his body. As the track reaches its middle 8 a multicoloured neon spacecraft appears.

More shots of the band, cityscape and 'SFA' monster follow until the final verse, when the view returns to the road from the beginning of the video. The camera then flies up inside a skyscraper made entirely of small images of a mouth singing the along with the track. As the song finishes the view again returns to the road. Small spaceships (similar to the one from the middle 8) gather at either side as the city is left behind and the road gradually disappears.

=== Aurelien and Florian Marrel video ===
A screenshot from the Aurelien and Florian Marrel music video showing 'Stage 01'

The Aurelien and Florian Marrel directed video begins with a shot of the band reflected in a television screen then cuts to the start screen of a fictional video game called 'Lazer Beam' which claims to have been made by the Kocakatpiece Corporation in 2005. 'Arcade mode' is selected then two characters are chosen from a menu featuring four Super Furry Animals band member lookalikes before a brief 'How to play' screen is shown.

An introduction screen is then shown featuring a villain with folded arms towering over several skyscrapers with the legend "Evil is reigning over this city" before panning down to see the four men from the character selection screen with the subtitle "A band is here to change things". Next a "Final Fight style overlay map" appears with the 'City' ('Stage 01') section flashing.

On 33 seconds the 'game' itself begins with the two player characters walking from left to right down a deserted street. As the first chorus begins several zombies enter from the right and are shot by the player characters. After 53 seconds the villain from the introduction appears and laughs before disappearing as the playing area is filled with zombies. The view changes to a cut scene showing close-ups of the two players sunglasses then pans out to show a spaceship illuminating the area with yellow light.

The video then cuts to a shot of the band playing the game before returning to the map screen as 'Docks' or 'Stage 02' flashes. The second level begins in much the same way as the first with the two characters shooting zombies who appear from the right. The villain again stands in front of the players, laughing before disappearing. A boat/submarine then enters from the right and begins firing bombs at the players who destroy it with laser beams. Another cut scene follows in which the crippled boat returns to a hangar in the sea with 'Evil' written above the entrance. The hangar explodes and disappears before flying out of the water, now with mechanical claws attached, and the video returns again to live action footage of the Super Furries playing the game.

The map is shown for the last time showing a third level, '???', flashing. The villain attacks the characters from above with his flying vehicle and has hit several times by lasers as he tries to hit the players with the machine's claws. A further cut scene then begins as one of the characters is seen activating a handset which calls the spaceship seen at the end of 'Stage 01'. The spaceship fires at the villain who flees his exploding vehicle stating "I'll be back" as he flies away.

The 'zombies' from levels 1 and 2, now looking perfectly fine, are shown lining the banks of a river, singing along to the tracks final verse. Balloons and rainbows are shown behind them and a whale jumps out of the water before the screen goes black and the words 'Game over' appear. More live action footage of the band follows with Huw Bunford raising his hands in triumph at completing the game and Guto Pryce being zapped by a laser. The final screen features the legend "F.B.I. winners don't use drugs!"

== Track listing ==
All songs by Super Furry Animals.

- Digipak CD (6760111)
1. "Lazer Beam" – 4:55
2. "Sunny Seville" – 3:25
3. "Colonise the Moon" – 4:33
- 7" (6760117)
1. "Lazer Beam" – 4:55
2. "Sunny Seville" – 3:25
- Promo CD (SFALOVE2)
1. "Lazer Beam (Album version)" – 4:55
2. "Lazer Beam (Radio edit)" – 3:36
- Promo 12" (SFALOVE3)
1. "Lazer Beam (Album version)" – 4:55
2. "Lazer Beam (DJ Marlboro mix)" – 3:52
3. "Lazer Beam (LFO mix)" – 5:10

A Danger Mouse remix of the track was also made available as a free download from the Love Kraft album website.

- Free download
1. "Lazer Beam (Danger Mouse remix)" – 3:55

== Personnel ==
- Gruff Rhys – Vocals
- Huw Bunford – Guitar
- Guto Pryce – Bass guitar
- Cian Ciaran – keyboards
- Dafydd Ieuan – Drums
- Debi McClean – Space vocal
- Clare Raybould - Violin
- Brian Wright – Violin
- Elspeth Cowey – Violin
- Ellen Blair – Violin
- Amanda Britton – Violin
- Sally Herbert – Violin
- Laura Melhuish – Violin
- Gill Morley – Violin
- Jacqueline Norrie – Violin
- Jordi & Jordi – Handclaps

== Chart positions ==
Chart	Peak position
European Hot 100 Singles	85
UK Singles Chart	28
