= Radiator (album) =

Studio album by Super Furry Animals
- Released: 25 August 1997
- Recorded: 1997
- Genres: Alternative rock; neo-psychedelia
- Length: 46:54
- Label: Creation
- Producers: Gorwel Owen, Super Furry Animals

Super Furry Animals chronology
Fuzzy Logic (1996)	Radiator (1997)	Ice Hockey Hair (1998)

Singles from Radiator
- 1. "Hermann ♥'s Pauline" Released: 12 May 1997; 2. "The International Language of Screaming" Released: 14 July 1997; 3. "Play It Cool" Released: 22 September 1997; 4. "Demons" Released: 24 November 1997

Radiator is the second studio album by Welsh alternative rock band Super Furry Animals. It was released in August 1997 by Creation Records, and later the same year in the United States under Flydaddy Records. It peaked at number eight on the UK Albums Chart. In 2005, it was reissued with a bonus disc of other tracks from the time.

Singer Gruff Rhys has described Radiator as "more interesting" than the band's debut Fuzzy Logic with the group taking advantage of producer Gorwel Owen's "Atari computers, and banks of old vintage synths" to create an album which was "musically ... much more adventurous". In 2013, NME ranked it at number 92 in its list of the 500 Greatest Albums of All Time. The Radiator campaign also marked the first time the band worked with graphic artist Pete Fowler, who provided paintings for the album and accompanying singles' sleeve. The band felt working with Fowler had provided them with a distinct visual identity, and apart from Hey Venus! have collaborated together on each album since.

== Release and reception ==
Professional ratings
Review scores
Source	Rating
AllMusic	4.5/5 stars
Encyclopedia of Popular Music	4/5 stars
The Guardian	4/5 stars
Mojo	4/5 stars
NME	9/10
Pitchfork	8.6/10
Q	4/5 stars
Record Collector	5/5 stars
The Rolling Stone Album Guide	3/5 stars
Uncut	9/10

In 2000 Q magazine placed Radiator at number 73 in its list of the 100 Greatest British Albums Ever. Stylus Magazine named Radiator in a list of ten essential albums released by Creation Records in a 2003 article about the label. In a 2017 list of the 50 Best Britpop Albums, Pitchfork placed Radiator at number 39. In 2013, NME ranked it at number 92 in its list of the 500 Greatest Albums of All Time.

== Track listing ==
All tracks are written by Super Furry Animals.

Disc 1: 2017 Remaster
No.	Title	Length
1.	"Furryvision™" (instrumental)	1:25
2.	"The Placid Casual"	2:49
3.	"The International Language of Screaming"	2:14
4.	"Demons"	5:12
5.	"Short Painkiller" (instrumental)	0:38
6.	"She's Got Spies"	4:43
7.	"Play It Cool"	3:16
8.	"Hermann ♥'s Pauline"	4:43
9.	"Chupacabras"	1:26
10.	"Torra Fy Ngwallt Yn Hir"	1:54
11.	"Bass Tuned to D.E.A.D"	3:20
12.	"Down a Different River"	5:37
13.	"Download"	3:19
14.	"Mountain People"	6:14

Disc 1: 'Ice Hockey Hair' EP (2017 Remaster)
No.	Title	Length
15.	"Smokin’"	5:05
16.	"Ice Hockey Hair"	6:57
17.	"Mu-Tron"	3:15
18.	"Let’s Quit Smoking"	1:48

Disc 1: Miscellaneous tracks
No.	Title	Length
19.	"Smoke"	4:00
20.	"Dim Ysmygu (Alternate Mix of 'Smoke')"	3:00
21.	"The Boy with the Thorn on His Side"	8:00

Disc 2: Clarity Just Confuses Me (Demo Sessions) / NOTE: Tracks 1–11 are 'B-Sides & Such' and tracks 12–23 are demo sessions.
No.	Title	Length
1.	"Cryndod Yn Dy Lais"	3:14
2.	"Hit and Run"	3:30
3.	"Foxy Music"	3:50
4.	"Pass the Time"	3:50
5.	"Calimero"	2:23
6.	"(untitled)"	3:48
7.	"Carry the Can"	4:46
8.	"Wrap It Up"	3:29
9.	"Trons Mr. Urdd"	4:39
10.	"nO.K / Frosty Night in Gothenberg"	4:58
11.	"Play It Cool (Original U.K. LP Mix)"	3:17
12.	"SFA Theme (Demo, Big Noise Studios, Cardiff, 16.12.96 - 19.12.96)"	0:26
13.	"The International Language of Screaming (Demo, Big Noise Studios, Cardiff, 16.12.96 - 19.12.96)"	1:12
14.	"Torra Fy Ngwallt Yn Hir (Demo, Big Noise Studios, Cardiff, 16.12.96 - 19.12.96)"	2:08
15.	"Down a Different River (Demo, Big Noise Studios, Cardiff, 16.12.96 - 19.12.96)"	4:28
16.	"She's Got Spies (Demo, Big Noise Studios, Cardiff, 16.12.96 - 19.12.96)"	4:33
17.	"Hit and Run (Demo, Big Noise Studios, Cardiff, 16.12.96 - 19.12.96)"	3:37
18.	"Mountain People (Demo, Big Noise Studios, Cardiff, 16.12.96 - 19.12.96)"	4:02
19.	"Play It Cool (Demo, Big Noise Studios, Cardiff, 16.12.96 - 19.12.96)"	3:49
20.	"Bass Tuned to D.E.A.D. (Demo, Big Noise Studios, Cardiff, 16.12.96 - 19.12.96)"	3:17
21.	"Naff Gan (Demo, Big Noise Studios, Cardiff, 16.12.96 - 19.12.96)"	3:48
22.	"The Placid Casual (Demo, Big Noise Studios, Cardiff, 16.12.96 - 19.12.96)"	3:29
23.	"Music Box (Demo, Big Noise Studios, Cardiff, 16.12.96 - 19.12.96)"	3:12

- Some American releases were packaged with Out Spaced, the band's 1998 B-sides collection.

== Personnel ==
- Gruff Rhys – vocals, acoustic and electric guitars, Moog, claps
- Huw Bunford – electric guitar, backing vocals
- Cian Ciaran – electronics, Rhodes piano, piano, backing vocals, claps
- Guto Pryce – bass, sub-bass, claps
- Dafydd Ieuan – drums, percussion, backing vocals, piano
- Les Morrison – banjo (on "Demons")
- Gorwel Owen – E-Bow, samples, electric harpsichord, backwards Rhodes
- Martin Smith – trumpet
- Simon James – tenor sax and flute
- Andrew Frizzell – trombone and alto sax
- The Electra Strings:
- Sonia Slany – violin
- Jules Singleton – violin
- Clair Arster – viola
- Dinah Beamish – cello
