= Songbook: The Singles, Vol. 1 =

2004 Greatest Hits album by Super Furry Animals

Greatest hits album by Super Furry Animals
- Released: 4 October 2004
- Recorded: 1995–2003
- Genre: Experimental rock
- Label: Epic (UK), Beggars XL (US)
- Producer: Chris Shaw, Gorwel Owen, Mario Caldato Jr, Super Furry Animals

Super Furry Animals chronology
Slow Life (2004)	Songbook: The Singles, Vol. 1 (2004)	Love Kraft (2005)

Professional ratings
Review scores
Source	Rating
Allmusic	link
BBC	extremely favourable link
Coke Machine Glow	93% link
Drowned in Sound	link
NME	link
Pitchfork Media	8.9/10 link
PopMatters	8/10 link
Rolling Stone	link
Stylus Magazine	A link
Yahoo! Music	10/10 stars

Songbook: The Singles, Vol. 1 collects all of the Super Furry Animals singles released between 1996 and 2004 as well as B-side "Blerwytirhwng?" (which can be found on their 1995 Welsh only debut EP Llanfairpwllgwyngyllgogerychwyrndrobwllllantysiliogogogoch (In Space)). Songbook... was released in the UK in October 2004, debuting at #18 on the UK album charts. The collection was not released in the U.S. until January 2005.

According to bassist Guto Pryce the album was "something that the record company wanted to do, and we were fine with that, but we were in the middle of making ... Love Kraft [so that] was where our heads were at". Despite this they did pick the track listing, a process they found easy. The band performed just two gigs in support of the album as they considered a 'greatest hits tour' "wasn't really us".

== Track listing ==
1. "Something 4 the Weekend" – 2:52
2. "It's Not the End of the World?" – 3:29
3. "Northern Lites" – 3:31
4. "Juxtapozed with U" – 3:11
5. "Slow Life" – 6:59
6. "Fire in My Heart" – 2:52
7. "The Man Don't Give a Fuck" – 4:48
8. "Hermann Loves Pauline" – 4:09
9. "Play It Cool" – 3:19
10. "Ice Hockey Hair" – 6:57
11. "Do or Die" – 2:06
12. "(Drawing) Rings Around the World" – 3:32
13. "God! Show Me Magic" – 1:50
14. "Ysbeidiau Heulog" – 2:52
15. "Demons" – 5:13
16. "Golden Retriever" – 2:29
17. "The International Language of Screaming" – 2:14
18. "Hello Sunshine" – 2:54
19. "Hometown Unicorn" – 3:36
20. "If You Don't Want Me to Destroy You" – 3:18
21. "Blerwytirhwng?" – 5:35

== DVD ==
Songbook: The Singles, Vol. 1

Video by Super Furry Animals
- Released: 4 October 2004
- Genre: Indie
- Label: Epic

Super Furry Animals chronology
Phantom Power (2003)	Songbook: The Singles, Vol. 1 (2004)

Professional ratings
Review scores
Source	Rating
Allmusic	Not rated link

The DVD of Songbook: The Singles, Vol. 1 contains 21 promotional music videos as well as the on-the-road documentary 'American Sasquatch', directed by Dylan Jones. Exclaim! called it "one of the best video collections available."

=== Track listing ===
1. "Something 4 the Weekend"
2. "It's Not the End of the World?"
3. "Northern Lites"
4. "Juxtapozed with U"
5. "Slow Life"
6. "Fire in My Heart"
7. "The Man Don't Give a Fuck"
8. "Hermann Loves Pauline"
9. "Play It Cool"
10. "Ice Hockey Hair"
11. "Do or Die"
12. "(Drawing) Rings Around the World"
13. "God! Show Me Magic"
14. "Demons"
15. "Golden Retriever"
16. "The International Language of Screaming"
17. "Hello Sunshine"
18. "Hometown Unicorn"
19. "If You Don't Want Me to Destroy You"
20. "Smokin'"
21. "Focus Pocus/Debiel"
