= Weevil (band) =

British indietronica music duo

- Origin: London, England
- Genre: Indietronica
- Years active: 1999–2007
- Label: Wichita Recordings
- Past members: Jonny Pilcher; Tom Betts; Ambrose Seddon

Weevil were a British indietronica duo from London, formed in 1999, consisting of Jonny Pilcher and Tom Betts.

== History ==
After releasing their self-titled debut album in 2001, were signed by Wichita Recordings. In 2004 they toured as part of Wichita's 'The Music Machines' touring package along with Bravecaptain and Her Space Holiday. Second album Drunk on Light was released in 2004, prompting comparisons with The Postal Service, Four Tet, and Aphex Twin. Les Inrockuptibles described the album as having elements of shoegazing and "cut and paste electronica". "Halfsmile" was released as a single in June 2004.

Portions of "Bytecry" from the album Drunk On Light were used for the Mac OS X Tiger intro video, which usually plays on the first bootup of any Mac installed with Mac OS X 10.4.

== Discography ==
=== Albums ===
- Weevil (2001), Where It's At Is Where You Are
- Drunk On Light (2004), Wichita
- Unreleased (2007), Orphan

=== Singles, EPs ===
- Fragile EP (2001), Orphan
- "Half-Smile"/"Lapsed" Single (2004), Wichita
- No-Harm EP (2004), Wichita
