= Killa Kela =

British beatboxer and rapper

Killa Kela (born Lee Potter) is a British beatboxer and rapper from West Sussex.

Kela's career began in 1997 with the formation of the U.K. hip hop crew, 360 Physicals. He transitioned from a rapper and MC, to a beatboxer and vocalist, gaining recognition through tours with notable artists and affiliations, such as the Rock Steady Crew and the Scratch Perverts. Kela popularized beatboxing in Europe, becoming the first beatbox artist from the continent to sign with a major label and receiving accolades for his innovative style. His performances are known for blending music styles and showcasing his "multivocalism" technique, which includes vocal scratching, imitations of popular songs, and a mix of drum and bass, electro, and hip hop.

Kela has collaborated with a range of artists and bands, participated in festivals, and contributed to media projects, including video games and commercials. He released albums and singles, notably "The Permanent Marker" and "Elocution". Kela engages in artist-to-artist conversations through his podcast, focusing on music and street culture. His ventures include the creation of a beatbox sample pack and the Killa Kela Livestream show. Kela has also provided artwork for UK Hip Hop fanzine "The Message", run by Eastborn and other UK Hip Hop notoriety.

== Career ==
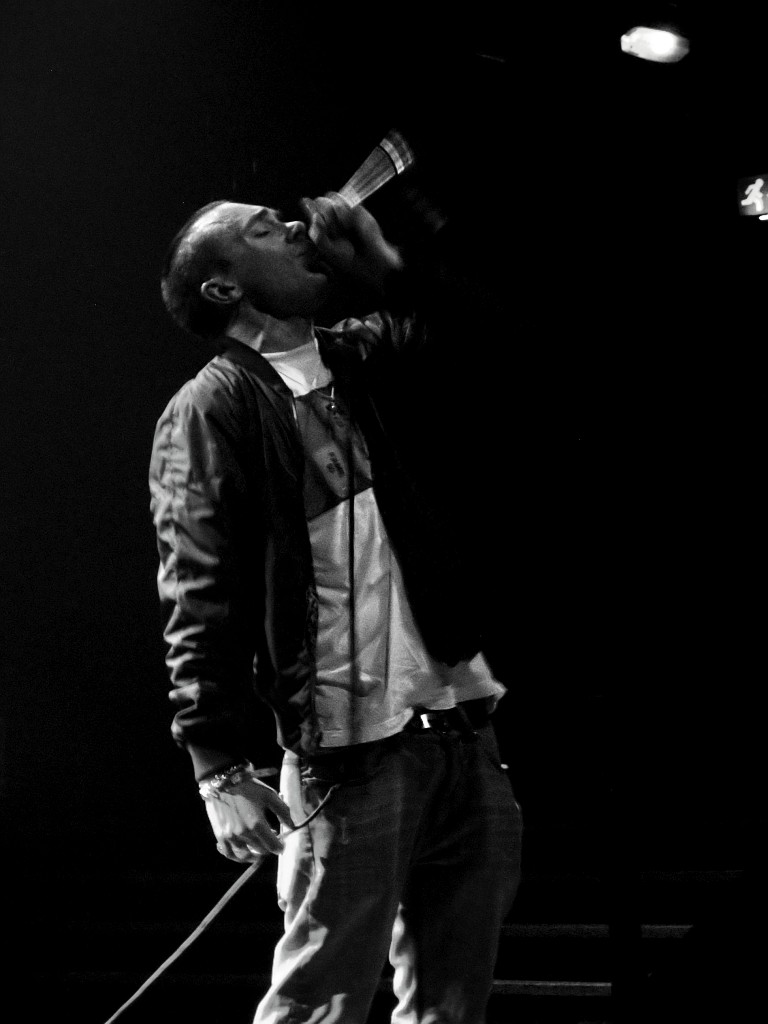
Killa Kela performing at the Camden Crawl in 2007

Killa Kela’s career started in 1997 when he formed a 10 collective strong U.K Hip Hop crew called 360 Physicals; composed of MC’s DJ’s and graffiti artists from across the Southeast of the U.K.

Initially a rapper and an MC, after honing his skills later as a beatboxer and vocalist, he was then taken under the wing of DJ Vadim (Ninja Tune/Jazz Fudge) and sent on tour with Vadim and his then live band “The Russian Percussion” alongside various Hip Hop artists of the day, inc. Company Flow, Swollen Members, Blurum13, The Scratch Perverts, The Arsonists, Jurassic 5 to name a few. 123 countries were toured and over 200 shows were performed in less than 18 months.

Around the same time Kela was inducted into the legendary New York Hip Hop organisation the Rock Steady Crew by the then Rocksteady U.K chapter representative Tuff Tim Twist. This came about after both Tim and RSC founder Crazy Legs (NYC), witnessed Kela perform (multiple times) at The U.K Breakdancing Championships which were held in London between 2001 - 2003.

Kela is also noted as the eighth member of the original U.K Scratch Perverts DJ team, after Kela performed with The Scratch Perverts during their success at the 1999 New York World DMC DJ finals where the team won their world DJ title. Scratch Perverts disbanded as an eight man team in 2002, but highlights of Kela’s time with the SP’s inc. Performing for the legendary BBC Radio DJ John Peeles on his 60th birthday, Showcasing at Reading & Leeds Festival, and being a host for the World DMC championship events for six years consecutively.

Kela pioneered the art of beatboxing and was the first beatbox artist to emerge from Europe. He was also the first beatbox artist to be signed to a major record label. Kela received the Stuff Magazine Award for "renegade of Style" 2006 in Los Angeles, he toured alongside Testicicles, Dev, Lightspeed Champion, and GLC (Goldie Lookin Chain) while performing on festival dates with Pharrell Williams and N*E*R*D. He also did a string of US spot dates with DJ Z-Trip in 2007. From 2003 to 2008, Kela was a special guest at various N*E*R*D / Pharrell Williams shows and festivals across Europe, including Seattle for the Sprite Liquid Mix festival and Oxegen Festival, Dublin. In 2008, Kela performed with Prince and Nikka Costa at the O2 Arena as a special guest.

His live shows incorporates drum and bass, electro and hip hop styles, singing, MCing, realistic vocal scratching, body movements, and imitations of popular songs such as "I'm a Slave 4 U" by Britney Spears and "Tom's Diner" by Suzanne Vega. He calls his technique "multivocalism", a term coined by Kela and then longtime artwork collaborator Mark Splinter in 2000. Kela formed the collective Spitkingdom, and performed hundreds of live shows all around the world; they were noted as a Soundsystem, consisting of four DJs and 4 MCs and were formed as a backbone for future Killa Kela projects. Spitkingdom also curated a weekly Hip Hop & Drum&Bas club night at Herbal nightclub in Shoreditch called “Spitkingdom HQ”.

Kela released The Permanent Marker in 2002, a beatbox-only album featuring Fallacy, Harry Love, and Normski. He then toured with Mobb Deep, Redman, Busta Rhymes, and others. He was second billed at the Earls Court Music festival with Jay-Z.

Some of his voices are featured on the Basement Jaxx single "Oh My Gosh" (2004)

Kela released an EP in Europe entitled "For Those Who've Joined Us", featuring Stereo MCs, Artful Dodger, and DJ Vadim.

The Elocution album (Sony BMG) came in 2005 and included The Elysian Quartet on strings, backing vocalists Rookwood and Trip, DJ Skeletrik, and his producer Spider on keys and vocals. It also featured Sweetie Irie, James Rushent (Does It Offend You, Yeah?), Roots Manuva, and Neneh Cherry, with writing from Karen Poole. His song Jawbreaker was put on the FIFA Street 2 soundtrack and is to date one of the strongest releases off the Elocution album.

Kela parted ways with Sony BMG in 2007. During this period he also travelled to China, playing in Shanghai and Beijing with the Infadels on a tour organised by Split Works.

Between albums, Kela created the single "Nightwatcher" (formerly "Addictive") alongside Alan Braxe (Stardust) and Fallon, for Universal Music.

He also created a mix album alongside his then crew Spitkingdom, entitled "Days That Shook The World" produced by James Rushent (Does It Offend You, Yeah?) and DJ Skelectrik, which received "Best Mix CD 2007 in DJ Magazine UK. He also released the album Ontourvandamage in 2008, produced by DJ Plus One (Scratch Perverts, Jack Beats)

In 2009, Kela created his debut album Amplified!. The album contained "Built Like An Amplifier" which included remixes from Dave Spoon, Sway, and Faith SFX. "Everyday" was produced by Alan Braxe with remixes from LifeLike, Jakwob, and Franz Ferdinand. It also included "Get A Rise," featuring Hadouken, which was heavily featured on the Need for Speed: Hot Pursuit soundtrack.

Other features include a Mentos candy commercial, Absolut Vodka Commercials for North America (2004), recent work alongside stylists Judy Blame, PinsLondon, Noki. studio work with Tinie Tempah, Wiley from his "See Clear Now" Album, The Kool Kids (US), visuals and beatbox for the Gorillaz Soundsystem project, and recording with The Glitch Mob. On 28 September that year, Kela appeared at the London School of Economics.

In 2011, he featured in the Plan B movie Ill Manors as well as collaborating with Plan B & Director Mike Figgis on a music/Short film piece entitled “Business Woman”.

Kela performed at the Glastonbury main stage to 83,000 people, as well as touring Australia and Asia.

In 2015, Kela performed alongside DJ Fresh and Fleur East at the Royal Albert Hall, and collaborated With UK Funky pioneer Roska on "Toll Booth" off the Asking 4 It EP. Them&Us also collaborated with The Stanton Warrior's with the track Cut Me Up on the Punks label.

In 2016 Them&Us won Best International Act at The Toronto Independent Music awards, as well as coming 3rd place at Indie Week Canada's annual international battle of the bands. Kela hit the road beatboxing as part of the half time show for Monster Energy's RX Rig Riot events, which took him on tour across Europe. He also performed at Hyde Parks Winter Wonderland over the Christmas season and performed his final show alongside all the original members of The Spitkingdom Soundsystem at the Jazz Cafe. The group disbanded after a year.

In 2018, Kela released the first of its kind beatbox sample pack on Splice, entitled "Killa Kela Body Parts" He also released the track "Smoke The Hydro" alongside Yunis of Saturate Records.

Kela was featured on the Conrank track "Set It Off" which was released on Circus Records, as well as TV commercials for Virgin Media (the sponsor for Britain's Got Talent ), Ford, and Campari in Germany.

Kela also appeared as a special guest for Rapper Samy Deluxe 's MTV Unplugged performance on MTV Germany.

In 2018, Kela launched a weekly podcast featuring interviews with artists and figures from street culture. The series includes discussions with musicians, graffiti writers, and fashion designers regarding their creative processes and influences.

In 2019, Kela created the Killa Kela Livestream show, the home for street culture with guests that included; Dynamo, Goldie, Basement Jaxx, Shola Ama, Kurrupt FM, Bob Vylan, Terry Walker, Deno Driz, Raekwon (Wu-Tang Clan) Example & The Stanton Warriors.

Kela has gone on to create the Kelavision App, with the inclusion of weekly mini docs, the Kelavision DJ team and more, servicing the world of music and competitive street culture.

== Discography ==
- Antistatic Mouthwash mix tape (2000)
- Heavy Artillery – All Terrain Series (2001)
- Crop Circles – All Terrain Series (2001)
- Permanent Marker (2002)
- For Those Who've Joined Us (2003)
- Jawbreaker (2003)
- Elocution (2005)
- Secrets (2005)
- Days That Shook The World Mix CD (2006)
- Reveal Your Inner Self (2007)
- Ontourvandamage Mix CD (2008)
- NightWatcher (2008)
- Built Like An Amplifier (2009)
- Everyday single (2010)
- Amplified! released through 100% Records (2010)
- Killa Kela & Eklips "Crowd Control" EP (2013)
- Them&Us "All Dolled Up EP" through Rubbaduck records (2014)
- Them&Us and Stanton Warriors "Cut Me Up" through Punks Records (2015)
- Them&Us "Chapter One: And So It Begins" EP Through Mermaid Punk/Them&Us (2015)
- Them&Us "Chapter Two: The Great Escape" EP Through Mermaid Punk/Them&Us (2015)
- Them&Us "Chapter Two: The Great Escape" EP (The Beatbox Version) Through Mermaid Punk/Them&Us (2015)
- Them&Us "Chapter Three: Icarus" Through Mermaid Punk/Them&Us (2016)
- Killa Kela "Body Parts" Through Splice (2018)
- Killa Kela & Yunis "Smoke The Hydro" (2018)
