= Pete Fowler =

Welsh artist

- Born: Pete Fowler; 1969 (age 56–57); Cardiff, Wales
- Known for: illustration, drawing, painting, animation, printmaking, sculpture
- Notable work: Artwork for the Welsh band Super Furry Animals, Monsterism toys and goods

Pete Fowler (born 1969 in Cardiff) is a Welsh artist best known for his artwork for the band Super Furry Animals and his Monsterism toys and goods. He is a freelance illustrator and "monster maker" inspired by animals, music, folklore, myths, psychedelia and super nature. He has also worked on a number of other projects in the UK and Japan, such as television advertisements (Kia Picanto), as well as having art exhibitions in the UK and abroad.

== Early life ==
Growing up in Cardiff before studying fine art at Falmouth University, Fowler was surrounded by music and the emerging skateboarding culture, but the sleeve imagery that made the greatest impact was that which adorned records by anarcho-punk band Crass. Having graduated in 1991, Fowler moved to London, where he tried to make ends meet by producing artwork for T-shirts and nightclub backdrops, while also putting on small exhibitions of his work in bars. Word spread quickly and it wasn’t long before Fowler received a phone call from Creation Records and an invitation to show his portfolio to the Super Furry Animals. [6]

== Monsterism ==
The majority of Fowler's art is made in a postmodern cartoon style and often revolves around a central narrative and features a recurring set of characters. The "monsters" Fowler creates all reside on "Monsterism Island". Fowler invents extensive back-stories for his characters; each has its own specific traits and levels of "monsterism". Fowler is most known for his designer toys of his characters, which he himself manufactures with his own company.

A CD called The Sounds of Monsterism Island was released in 2005 by Heavenly Records. According to the press release, "The record is a compilation album that works as a soundtrack to the world of Monsterism. The album features psychedelic music from the '60s through to today, much of it unearthed and put on CD for the first time." In 2006, Fowler created a set of comics about Monsterism Island which have been featured in Vice Magazine. The second soundtrack to Monsterism Island, A Psychedelic Guide to Monsterism Island, was released in 2009 and features mostly new compositions by a host of contemporary musicians.

== Notable events ==
Fowler is one half of the deckshoegaze/cosmic disco outfit Seahawks who have released extensively on vinyl, CD and download since 2010 and have remixed a variety of bands as well as regularly DJing, with Fowler commonly playing the genres of 70's smooth rock, discoid and balearic debris.

== Collaborations ==
Fowler has worked with a myriad of different clients including Disney, Levi's, Lynx, AVG, Kia Motors, Paul Smith, Sony, EMI, Warner Brothers, Poweo, Hewlett Packard, Boxfresh, Vice Magazine, GQ, Volvic, Etnies, MTV, Konami, BMG, Island Records, Rough Trade, Aardman Animation, Unilever, Greenpeace, Redbull, Warp Films, Haiti Benefit, The co-operative, Future Publishing, Big Chill, Camp Bestival & Bestival, All Tomorrows Parties, Green Man, The Horrors, Clinic and Super Fury Animals [7]

== Collaboration with Super Furry Animals ==
Gruff Rhys member of the band was introduced to some of Fowler's murals just after a tour in Japan and after being immersed in Japanese imagery seeing Fowlers work was a ‘Eureka moment’ [8]. Fowler and Super Furry Animals met as both Pete and Gruff Rhys were huge fans of each other and believed a collaboration would work due to an alignment of abstract art in terms of the designs of Fowlers work and the music the band created. Fowler worked on a myriad of pieces for the band including albums covers, single covers and figurines.

== Radiator album ==
Fowlers most notable work is his work for Super Furry animals. His artwork for the front cover of one of the bands most famous albums ‘Radiator’. The album released on August 25, 1997 [9] is one of the bands most sold albums with over 100,000 sales as of September, 2017 [10]. The artwork Fowler was inspired by the sinister undertones of Japanese Art an art style synonyms with much of Fowlers work. The sleeve originally had a bear-man facing an apparition in an opposing window but eventually became two bears, an evil one becoming a reflection of the good one. [11] Since the birth of the Album the artwork for it has been sold on T-shirts and been made into posters.

== Kia Motors Advert ==
Fowler worked with South Korean car company Kia in their advert promoting the new small model Kia Picanto in 2005. [12] The advert had a £15,000,000 budget and was directed by Pete Candeland who previously worked with animations for Gorriliaz. [12] Behind the advert was Fowler who designed the kia family of characters. [13] It was created in “claymation” - plasticine models brought to life by stop motion animation. The process took 3 months for only 30 seconds of footage and was hugely unique for a car company to advertise in this manner in a ‘less serious way’.
