= Dim Probs =

Studio album by Gruff Rhys
- Released: 12 September 2025
- Recorded: Late 2024
- Length: 35:12
- Language: Welsh
- Label: Rock Action
- Producers: Gruff Rhys; Ali Chant

Gruff Rhys chronology
Sadness Sets Me Free (2024)	Dim Probs (2025)

Singles from Dim Probs
- 1. "Chwyn Chwyldroadol!" Released: 12 June 2025; 2. "Saf ar Dy Sedd" Released: 17 July 2025; 3. "Taro #1 + #2" Released: 12 August 2025

Dim Probs (Welsh for 'no probs') is the ninth studio album by Welsh musician Gruff Rhys. It was released on 12 September 2025 through Rock Action Records and was produced by Rhys with Ali Chant. It is also his third solo album in the Welsh language, six years after Pang! (2019). Notable Welsh musicians Cate Le Bon and H. Hawkline contribute backing vocals on two tracks. It was nominated for the 2026 Welsh Music Prize.

== Background and composition ==
In the years leading up to the writing of Dim Probs, Rhys had been sifting through a number of homemade electronic music cassette tapes performed in the Welsh language with his friends. He told Uncut in August 2025 that he had been listening specifically "to a lot of the early 1980s output of the Ofn and Neon electronic labels who turned out incredible tapes initially on four-track recorders". Originally intending to release a compilation from those tapes, Rhys at some point decided to abort the project indefinitely in favour of making a Welsh album of his own, writing its material on a "cheap Swedish catalogue acoustic guitar". Inspired by the tapes he had been researching, the songs on Dim Probs were supplemented with a series of analogue electronics that largely consisted of synthesiser drones and drum machines. Dim Probs features contributions from his touring band, and fellow Welsh musicians Cate Le Bon and H. Hawkline contribute backing vocals on both "Pan ddaw'r Haul i Fore" and "Chwyn Chwyldroadol!". The album was produced by Rhys and Ali Chant and was recorded at Chant's studio in Bristol in late 2024. It is his third album in the Welsh language, following his debut Yr Atal Genhedlaeth (2005) and Pang! (2019), or his fourth if counting Mwng (2000) by Super Furry Animals.

In a departure from its more pop-oriented predecessor Sadness Sets Me Free (2024), Dim Probs took a more minimal, lo-fi approach, with the exception of tracks like "Taro #1 + #2" and "Acw" which respectively feature horn and saxophone sections. Musically, the album's overall tone has been described in terms such as "mellow", "laid-back", and "relatively carefree", but lyrically, this is juxtaposed with dark subject matter such as death, the inevitability of which is addressed on songs such as "Taro #1 + #2". In fact, Rhys has revealed that when the album was written, he "was in a particularly bleak place", and that the title "Dim Probs", a Welsh English dialectal phrase translating to "No Probs", was intended to be ironic.

== Singles ==
On 12 June 2025, alongside the announcement for Dim Probs, its lead single "Chwyn Chwyldroadol!" (English: "Revolutionary Weed!") was revealed with a music video. According to a statement by Rhys, the video was directed by his neighbour Ryan Eddleston and was shot from a 1960s Arriflex portable camera with spare 33 millimeter film from a canister left over from the film Righteous Kill (2008). Then on 17 July, Rhys released the second single, "Saf ar Dy Sedd" ("Stand on Your Seat"). The corresponding animated video was made by the Cornwall-based animated studio Spider Eye. A tribute to the Welsh language promoter Toni Schiavone, the song was inspired by an incident in May 2024 where Schiavone refused to pay a parking ticket issued in English. The final single in anticipation of the album, "Taro #1 + #2" ("Hit #1 + #2"), was released on 12 August, with a video arriving later.

== Release ==
Dim Probs was released on 12 September 2025 through Rock Action Records. On the week of its release, it did not place on the UK Albums Chart, though it managed to place on the Scottish and UK Independent Albums Charts, debuting at no. 44 and no. 4, respectively.

== Critical reception ==
Professional ratings
Aggregate scores
Source	Rating
AnyDecentMusic?	7.8/10
Metacritic	84/100
Review scores
Source	Rating
AllMusic	4/5 stars
Clash	8/10
Classic Pop	3/5 stars
Mojo	4/5 stars
MusicOMH	4.5/5 stars
Record Collector	4/5 stars
Rock & Folk	4/5 stars
Shindig!	4/5 stars
The Times	4/5 stars
Uncut	8/10

According to the review aggregator Metacritic, Dim Probs received "universal acclaim" based on a weighted average score of 84 out of 100 from 6 critic scores. On another aggregator AnyDecentMusic?, it was given an average of 7.8 out of 10 based on 5 critical reviews.

Fiona Shepherd of Uncut magazine thought that "What may be lost slightly in translation is mitigated by the musicality of the vocal tones," and Tom Doyle of Mojo wrote that "Even with zero knowledge of what is going on lyrically, these songs are often beautifully evocative." In Clash, John Williamson said that "To a non-Welsh speaker, the joy is in the simplicity, repetition and sparseness and, to be honest, Rhys could be singing anything, and it would still sound good", finding Dim Probs to be "a relaxed (and relaxing) thing of warm humanity and beauty that, in the long run, may be more durable than much of his more lavish and accessible outputs." Will Hodgkinson wrote in The Times that "the tunefulness of the language lends itself to Rhys’s gentle approach. ... Rhys is a subtle and a sophisticated songwriter, meaning the charms of this delightful low-key album reveal themselves over time."

In a four and a half star review for MusicOMH, Ben Hogwood said that despite the six-year gap between Dim Probs and its Welsh language predecessor Pang!, it "feels more personal, confidential, and ultimately vulnerable. It reaffirms Rhys as a generous author, celebrating his first language but taking in rich influences and instrumentation from countries far and wide." AllMusic's Tim Sendra called it "vintage Gruff Rhys and the very simplicity and directness of the album sets it off from the many concepts and schemes of his other, bigger records", concluding with the adage "Sometimes less truly is more." In Shindig! magazine, Camilla Aisa praised Dim Probs for retaining a quality consistent in Rhys' output and for its "classic Gruff melodies", singling out "Chwyn Chwyldroadol!" as an example where Rhys' Welsh vocals gave them "a distinct – and mesmerising – musicality." In a slightly more reserved review for Classic Pop magazine, Jeremy Allen said that while they found it to be "delightful" overall, "it does make one long for some of the sonic radicalism of the perpetually hibernating Super Furries – the Fela Kuti-style horns on the closing 'Acw' aside."

=== Accolades ===
The music magazine Mojo ranked Dim Probs 65 out of 75 on its list of the best albums of 2025. The album also received an honourable mention on Under the Radar's list for the top 100 albums that year.

In September 2026, it was revealed that Dim Probs was shortlisted for the annual Welsh Music Prize. Rhys previously won the award at its 2011 inauguration with the album Hotel Shampoo. The prize was ultimately won by Dafydd Owain for the album Ymarfer Byw during the ceremony on 7 October.

== Track listing ==
All tracks are written by Gruff Rhys.

Dim Probs track listing
No.	Title	English translation	Length
1.	"Pan ddaw'r Haul i Fore"	"When the Sun Comes to Morning"	4:01
2.	"Cân i'r Cymylau"	"Song to the Clouds"	2:02
3.	"Saf ar Dy Sedd"	"Stand on Your Seat"	2:56
4.	"Taro #1 + #2"	"Hit #1 + #2"	4:08
5.	"Dos Amdani"	"Go for It"	3:43
6.	"Chwyn Chwyldroadol!"	"Revolutionary Weed!"	2:22
7.	"Cyflafan"	"Massacre"	2:26
8.	"Dim Probs"	"No Probs"	3:08
9.	"Adar Gwyn"	"White Birds"	2:36
10.	"Gadael Fi Fynd"	"Let Me Go"	2:14
11.	"Slaw" (instrumental)	"Slaw"	1:42
12.	"Acw"	"There"	3:54
Total length:			35:12

== Personnel ==
Credits are adapted from the CD liner notes, except where noted.

=== Musicians ===
- Gruff Rhys – guitar, programming (all tracks); vocals (except 11); keyboards, synthesiser (except 6); bass (except 5, 8, 11); drums (1, 6)
- Kliph Scurlock – tom toms (1), drums (2, 4, 9, 12), live electronic drums (5)
- Cate Le Bon, H. Hawkline – backing vocals (1, 6)
- Osian Gwynedd – piano (2)
- Gavin Fitzjohn – wind instruments (4, 12)
- Huw V. Williams – double bass (5, 8)

=== Technical and design ===
- Gruff Rhys – production
- Ali Chant – production, engineering, mixing
- H. Hawkline, Huw V. Williams – additional engineering
- Jason Mitchell – mastering at Loud
- Kliph Scurlock – digital file and song transition assistance
- Pete Fowler – cover
- Dave Thomas (as dlt) – additional typing

== Charts ==
Chart performance for Dim Probs
Chart (2025)	Peak position
French Rock & Metal Albums (SNEP)	81
Scottish Albums (OCC)	44
UK Albums Sales (OCC)	17
UK Independent Albums (OCC)	4
