= Boy Azooga =

Welsh indie rock group

- Origin: Cardiff, Wales
- Genres: Dream pop
- Years active: 2017–present
- Labels: PIAS / Heavenly Recordings
- Members: Davey Newington (vocals, guitar); Live: Dafydd Davies (drums); Sam Barnes (bass); Dylan Morgan (keyboard)
- Website: boyazooga.co.uk

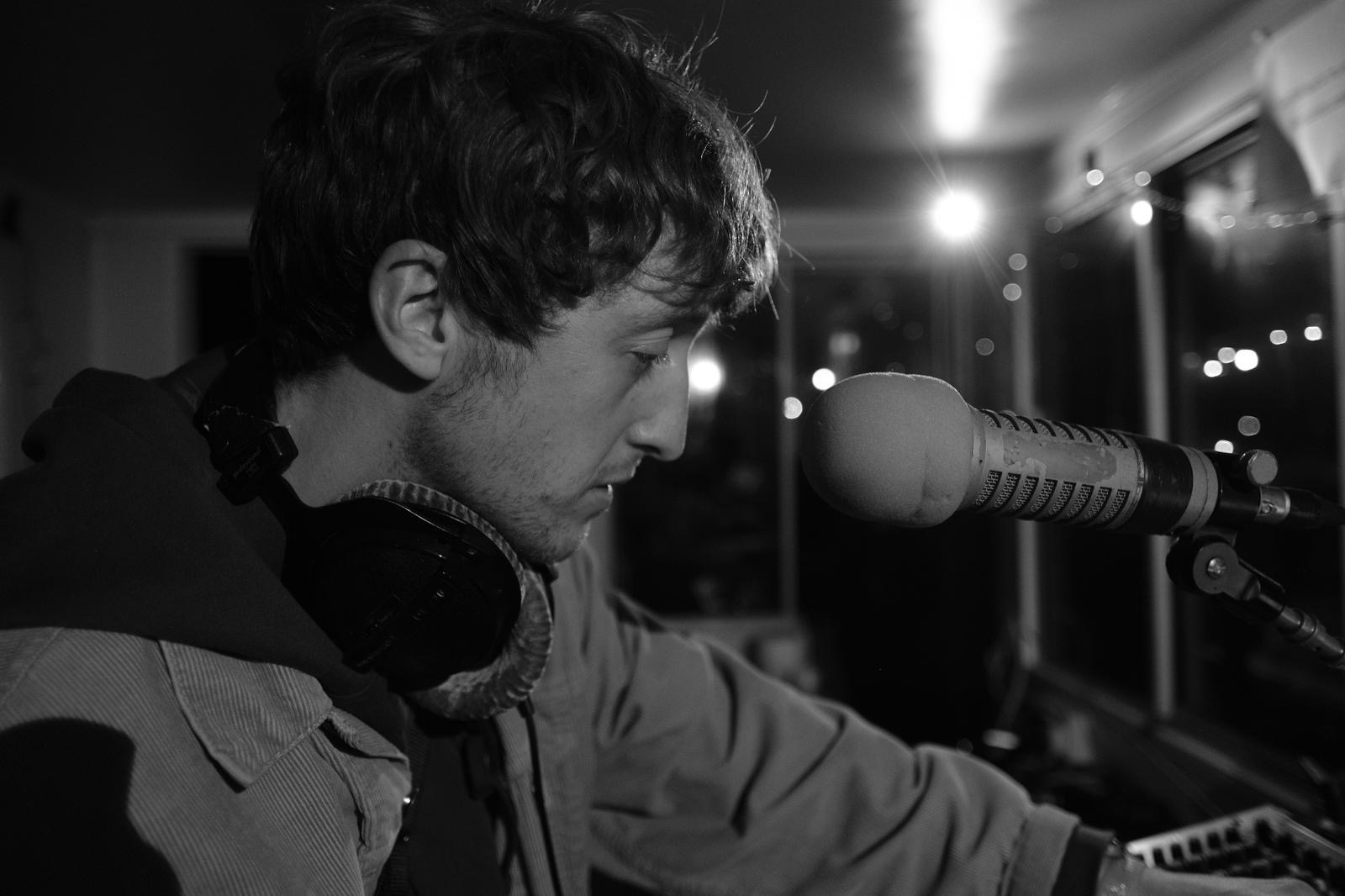
Davey Newington DJing at Greenman Festival (Photo by Lucien Wise)

Boy Azooga are a Welsh band from Cardiff, Wales. Formed in 2016, the group is led by front man Davey Newington (vocals, guitar), who is joined live by band members Dafydd Davies (drums), Sam Barnes (bass), and Dylan Morgan (keyboard).

== History ==
Davey Newington writes the music and plays the instruments on record. The bands influences include The Beach Boys, Dungen, The Lemon Twigs, Charles Bradley (singer), El Michels Affair, Keys, Weyes Blood, Bernard Herrmann and The Beatles. The early releases were a result of work between lead singer Davey Newington and hip hop producer Ed Al-Shakarchi (Dr Ed Boogie). The band name originates from the 1994 comedy film The Little Rascals, which Newington would watch as a child when visiting his grandmother in Scotland.

In 2017 the band made their first festival appearance at Green Man Festival in the Brecon Beacons.

The band toured their debut album in several British towns and cities in June 2018. Later that year they performed at Paradiso in Amsterdam and at the Live at Leeds festival.

Boy Azooga made their television debut in May 2018 on Later... with Jools Holland, alongside fellow Welsh artists Gwenno and Manic Street Preachers. Newington has also appeared on a show hosted by Mike D of the Beastie Boys as well as having their music featured on BBC Radio 1 and BBC Radio 6 Music.

In May 2019, the band performed as a warm up act for Neil Young on a European tour. Liam Gallagher has previously claimed that the band are his "favourite up and coming artist". The band went on to support him for a couple of concerts at the end of 2019 including two nights at The 02 Arena in London.

== Live Band members ==
- Davey Newington – vocals, guitar (2017–present)
- Dafydd Davies – drums (2017–present)
- Sam Barnes – bass (2017–present)
- Dylan Morgan – guitar, keyboard (2017–present)

=== Davey Newington ===
A native of Cardiff, Newington was introduced to music at an early age by his parents, classically trained musicians who met in the BBC National Orchestra of Wales. Newington took up drums at age six, and began songwriting at fourteen. He also played the timpani, xylophone and sleigh bells in youth orchestras. Although proficient on several instruments, in the early part of his career he mainly played drums.

Newington decided to sign with label Heavenly Recordings after following the career of King Gizzard & the Lizard Wizard. Label owner Jeff Barrett listened to the track "Hangover Square" while he was travelling to a King Gizzard performance in Brighton, he heard the lyric "on the train to Brighton" and called Newington confirming he would like to sign the band to the label.

Newington began writing his discography at age 19, beginning with Hangover Square from what became their debut album 1 2 Kung Fu! He recorded largely all of 1 2 Kung Fu, except for some string performances by his father on "Jerry", "Hangover Square" and "Breakfast Epiphany II". His father Richard Newington is a violinist with the BBC National Orchestra of Wales and has a wide range of other credits, including appearances on Gruff Rhys' 2018 album, Babelsberg.

Newington has played drums for artists including Katy J Pearson, H. Hawkline, Alice Low and Charlotte Church. He is currently finishing writing the bands second album.

== Discography ==
=== Singles ===
Year	Title	Label	Album
2017	"Face Behind Her Cigarette"	Heavenly Recordings	1 2 Kung Fu!
2017	"Face Behind Her Cigarette" (Mikey Young Remix)	Heavenly Recordings	
2018	"Loner Boogie"	Heavenly Recordings	1 2 Kung Fu!
2018	"Jerry"	Heavenly Recordings	1 2 Kung Fu!
2018	"Waitin'" (Edit)	Heavenly Recordings	1 2 Kung Fu!
2018	"Do the Standing Still"	Heavenly Recordings	
2019	"O Silly Me"	Heavenly Recordings	
2020	"U.F.O"	Heavenly Recordings	

=== Albums ===
Year	Title	Label
2018	1 2 Kung Fu!	Heavenly Recordings
