= The Terror of Cosmic Loneliness =

Studio album by Tony Da Gatorra & Gruff Rhys
- Released: 26 July 2010
- Recorded: 2010
- Genre: Alternative rock
- Length: 42:35
- Label: Turnstile

Gruff Rhys chronology
Candylion (2007)	The Terror of Cosmic Loneliness (2010)	Hotel Shampoo (2011)

Professional ratings
Aggregate scores
Source	Rating
Metacritic	55/100
Review scores
Source	Rating
BBC	
Drowned in Sound	5/10 stars
The Line of Best Fit	
Metro	3/5 stars
Pitchfork	5.6/10
PopMatters	5/10 stars
The Quietus	
Under the Radar	3/10 stars

The Terror of Cosmic Loneliness is a collaborative album by Welsh singer Gruff Rhys and Brazilian musician Tony Da Gatorra. It was released on 26 July 2010 by Turnstile Music.

== Critical reception ==
The Terror of Cosmic Loneliness was met with "mixed or average" reviews from critics. At Metacritic, which assigns a weighted average rating out of 100 to reviews from mainstream publications, this release received an average score of 55 based on 8 reviews.

In a review for Drowned in Sound, Kyle Ellison wrote: "Unfortunately this doesn't make for the most coherent of listens, and for the most part this record feels half-baked. Moments of genuine inspiration are difficult to find, which is surprising considering the pair's obvious talent and intrigue. While the most fully formed song, 'In A House With No Mirrors', hints at the duo's potential, even this is fairly ordinary and the track feels incongruous with the sparser sounds found elsewhere. It's disappointing, too, that for an album with such a brilliantly evocative title, it mostly fails to create a mood that corresponds." Alex Wisgard of The Line of Best Fit stated: "The ten songs on The Terror of Cosmic Loneliness make up the strangest record Gruff Rhys has ever put his name to – this from a man whose back catalogue includes an electropop concept album about John DeLorean."

== Track listing ==
No.	Title	Length
1.	"O Que tu Tem"	7:05
2.	"In a House with No Mirrors (You'll Never Get Old)"	4:54
3.	"Espirito Luz"	5:13
4.	"Oh! Warra Hoo!"	4:04
5.	"Eu Protesto"	5:00
6.	"OVNI"	3:34
7.	"Voz Dos Semterra"	4:46
8.	"6868"	2:13
9.	"Rap Verdade"	4:35
10.	"(Peidiwch Ac) OVNI"	1:11
