= Ysgol Dyffryn Ogwen =

Coordinates: 53.1843°N 4.0645°W

Location
- Ffordd Coetmor; Bethesda, Gwynedd, LL57 3NN; Wales

Information
- Type: Comprehensive
- Motto: Bydded Goleuni
- Established: 1951
- Local authority: Gwynedd
- Head teacher: Kelly Louise Morgan
- Age: 11 to 18
- Enrolment: 367 (2024)
- Website: http://www.ysgoldyffrynogwen.org/index.php

Ysgol Dyffryn Ogwen ("Ogwen Valley School") is a bilingual secondary school for pupils aged 11 to 19 years. It is situated in Bethesda in the Ogwen valley in Gwynedd, Wales. As of 2024, there were 367 pupils on roll at the school. Some of the buildings date from 1895 when a County School (grammar school) was established here, but the present comprehensive school dates from 1951. An extension to the school was opened by Professor Sir Idris Foster. The motto of the school is "Bydded goleuni" ("Let there be light", Gen. 1.3)

The school is fed by primary schools in the surrounding villages: Ysgol Llanllechid, Ysgol Pen y Bryn, Ysgol Rhiwlas, Ysgol Tregarth and Ysgol Bodfeurig. The school has an intake of 70-90 pupils per year. Around a quarter of pupils will go on to study A-Levels.

According to the latest Estyn report, 84% of pupils come from homes where Welsh is spoken by at least one parent.

== 2006 Estyn Inspection Report ==
The 2006 Estyn School Report noted:

All pupils belong to the white ethnic group. Seventy eight per cent [78%] of pupils come from homes in which Welsh is the main language and 22% from homes in which English is the main language.

All pupils come from an economically disadvantaged area. According to the Welsh Index of Multiple Deprivation 2000, the two most populous wards in the school's catchment area are amongst the 15% most deprived wards in Gwynedd, with one of the two wards amongst the 3% most deprived in Wales in terms of income deprivation. In both wards also, the unemployment rate is double the national figure. Seventeen per cent [17%] of the pupils are registered as entitled to free school meals, which is 5% higher than the county’s average figure of 12%, and 1% higher than the average figure for Wales (16%).

In 2006, only 27% of pupils in the year gained A*-C grades in GCSE science, compared to 56% in the county and 48% throughout Wales.

In 2006, the percentage gaining five GCSE grades A*-C was 46%, in comparison with 60% in the county and 53% throughout Wales.

In 2006, performance in GCSE English was poor, with only 31% of boys gaining grades A*-C.

In 2006, 59% of students in the sixth form gained at least two A-C grades at A-level, in comparison with 68% in the county and Wales.

Throughout the school years, pupils with special educational needs are challenged appropriately and achieve good standards. However the challenge for more able pupils is more limited. This limits their achievement and subsequently their attainment.

== Notable former pupils ==
- Y Prifardd (Chief bard) Emrys Edwards - poet
- Sir Idris Foster - Jesus Professor of Celtic Studies at the University of Oxford
- Lisa Jên - founder and member of 9Bach
- Caradog Prichard - poet, novelist, journalist
- John Ogwen - actor
- Gruff Rhys of the Super Furry Animals
- Goronwy Roberts, Baron Goronwy-Roberts - former Labour Government Foreign Minister
- T. Gwynn Jones (Gwynn Tregarth) - National Eisteddfod of Wales Music Director and Sword Bearer
- Members of Maffia Mr Huws (a 1980s band) attended the school.
- Gethin from popular pop band Dusky Grey
- Ieuan Wyn - Prifardd (Chief Bard)
