= The Almond & the Seahorse (soundtrack) =

Soundtrack album by Gruff Rhys
- Released: 24 February 2023
- Recorded: 2021–2022
- Studio: Playpen (Bristol, England); Llandaff North Scout Hall (Cardiff, Wales); Wings for Jesus (Cardiff, Wales)
- Length: 1:09:24
- Label: Rough Trade
- Producer: Gruff Rhys

Gruff Rhys chronology
Seeking New Gods (2021)	The Almond & the Seahorse (2023)	Sadness Sets Me Free (2024)

Singles from The Almond & the Seahorse
- 1. "People Are Pissed" / "Arogldarth" Released: 9 March 2022; 2. "Amen b/w "Love Love Love" Released: 15 December 2022; 3. "Layer upon Layer" / "Orea" Released: 24 January 2023; 4. "I Want My Old Life Back" / "Liberate Me from the Love Song" Released: 21 February 2023

The Almond & the Seahorse is a soundtrack album by the Welsh musician Gruff Rhys, composed for the 2022 film of the same name and released on 24 February 2023 through Rough Trade Records. It follows his previous album, the critically acclaimed Seeking New Gods (2021), and it is his second full-length soundtrack album after the 2016 soundtrack for the film Set Fire to the Stars (2014). Recorded in bursts during the COVID-19 pandemic lockdown across England, Wales, and France, it mixes original songs with instrumentals, several of which prominently feature the Mellotron and the cello. Preceded by eight of its twenty-two tracks, it debuted at no. 1 on the UK Soundtrack Albums Chart, and it was met with generally positive reviews.

== Background and recording ==
A double album of songs and instrumentals, The Almond & the Seahorse is Rhys' first full-length record since 2021's critically acclaimed Seeking New Gods. He was reported to have signed on to make the soundtrack for The Almond and the Seahorse starring Charlotte Gainsbourg and Rebel Wilson by late 2020. It is his second film soundtrack overall, following 2014's Set Fire to the Stars (whose soundtrack was released later in September 2016). Both films were co-written by Celyn Jones.

Some tracks on the album were originally written before he was attached to the project, such as "Amen" and "I Want My Old Life Back". Recording sessions occurred in bursts of activity between 2021 and 2022 during the coronavirus pandemic, in Bristol at Ali Chant's Playpen Studio, in Cardiff both at Kris Jenkins' studio Wings for Jesus and Llandaff North Scout Hall, and in Paris with Victor Le Masne for the track "Orea". Members of the BBC National Orchestra of Wales contribute to the album, and two tracks are collaborations between Rhys and other artists: the aforementioned "Orea" with Le Masne and "Variation with Strings" with Osian Gwynedd.

== Composition ==
Given the story of the film, which centers around two couples whose partner's experience amnesia after going through a brain injury, the film's editor Mike Jones had suggested to Rhys "to take things to a more acoustic, emotional and ragged place". Returning to a melodic motif that occasionally presents itself throughout, much of the record makes use of the cello and the Mellotron. The cello is most prominent on instrumentals such as "Skyward" and "Variation with Strings". According to Rhys, the use of these specific instruments was intentional; the extensive use of the cello is in reference to Trine Dyrholm's character Gwen's use of the instrument, and for the Mellotron, he associated the film's setting of Liverpool and the Wirral to the song "Strawberry Fields Forever" by the Liverpudlian band the Beatles.

A mix of original songs and instrumentals, the resultant soundtrack is a more varied work that hearkens to multiple stages of Rhys' career up to that point. For example, in Record Collector, the electro pop "Layer upon Layer" was seen as reminiscient to his work with Neon Neon, whereas the more acoustic-oriented song "Sunshine and Laughter Ever After" invoked a comparison to his 2007 album Candylion. Otherwise, the album explores psychedelic pop such as on "Amen" and ballads on tracks like "Orea" and "Liberate Me from the Love Song". One of the songs more intrinsically connected to the film is "The Brain and the Body", which features dialogue between Rebel Wilson and Celyn Jones. Many of the instrumentals featured throughout primarily sit on the latter half of the record.

== Promotion and singles ==
=== People Are Pissed EP ===
On 9 March 2022, Rhys released the double single containing "People Are Pissed" and "Arogldarth", his first set of material since his 2021 album Seeking New Gods, excluding a vocal appearance on the album Aboogi by Imarhan, and "Of No Fixed Identity", a previously unreleased song by Super Furry Animals that represents their first recording. Both tracks on the single were written for the then-upcoming film The Almond and the Seahorse, and with both tracks amounting to roughly eight minutes long each, Rhys promoted the single as an EP entitled People Are Pissed, named after the titular song which was accompanied by a lyric video. The EP was released physically a month later on 15 April through Rough Trade on a limited edition cassette designed by Mark James.

"People Are Pissed" is a piano-led song wherein he criticises the Boris Johnson administration's handling of the coronavirus pandemic in the UK. He later clarified on Twitter that the recordings were prepared long before invasion of Ukraine had begun and that the lyrics had no connection to that event. "Arogldarth" was described by Rhys as "a more meditative solo guitar and synthesizer instrumental" which was ultimately left out of the film.

=== Announcement and subsequent singles ===
On 15 December 2022, one day before the film went to theatres, the soundtrack was officially announced. Coinciding with this was the release of the single "Amen" with a corresponding video directed by Ryan Owen Eddleston, which cuts between Rhys and scenes from the movie. "Amen" was written before he was approached to make a soundtrack, and in a statement, he said that "the yearning and frustration of the song seemed to fit the themes of the film perfectly and the song soundtracks the emotional final payoff at the very end of the movie". With the single, the relatively short track "Love Love Love" was also included.

On 24 January the following year, Rhys simultaneously revealed two more singles: "Layer upon Layer" and "Orea". The former, which was also accompanied by a lyric video, was written for the opening title sequence of the film with a tempo matching cast member Rebel Wilson's journey through Liverpool and the Wirral. "Orea" is a collaboration with the French musical artist Victor Le Masne and was recorded in Paris before the pandemic.

Just three days before the soundtrack's release, two final songs were revealed. "I Want My Old Life Back", according to Rhys, was written in 2020 during an incident where he was left stranded at a pub for days after a gig because his van had been severely impacted during a nighttime flash flood on the A1. "Liberate Me from the Love Song" is an keyboard and drum machine-based prototype of the song that ended up being used in the film. Upon the songs' release, eight tracks in total were made available before the soundtrack as a whole.

=== Tour ===
Rhys toured in promotion of the album in the U.S. during the fall of 2023, often opening for This Is the Kit for whom he produced their album Careful of Your Keepers (2023).

== Release ==
The Almond & the Seahorse was released on 24 February 2023 through Rough Trade Records. Although it did not place on the main UK Albums Chart, it debuted at no. 1 on the UK Soundtrack Albums Chart, additionally peaking on the Scottish and UK Independent Albums Charts at no. 69 and no. 22, respectively.

== Critical reception ==
Professional ratings
Review scores
Source	Rating
Mojo	3/5 stars
Record Collector	4/5 stars
Shindig!	4/5 stars
Uncut	7/10

In a four star review for Shindig! magazine, Camilla Aisa thought that the soundtrack "makes for a fittingly vulnerable journey but retains its writer's characteristic whimsicality and wit", finding it to be "an absorbing listening experience" that "manage[s] to make sense even without its visual counterpart." James McNair of Mojo thought that when separating the music from the film, "it's the original songs which captivate most here," and singled out the "intimate ballads" "Orea" and "Liberate Me from the Love Song" as standouts.

Jason Draper of Record Collector, comparing the soundtrack to the film's subject matter, found the music to be "similarly unpredictable," with "his synapses firing out ideas that touch on almost every corner of his career." Writing for Uncut magazine, Piers Martin called the soundtrack was "meandering" with how "he happily veers all over the place" in an attempt to support the themes of the film but thought that Rhys nonetheless "generally plays to his strengths, surprising you when you least expect it", describing tracks like "Layer upon Layer" as "top-drawer power-pop".

== Track listing ==
All tracks are written by Gruff Rhys, with additional composition by Victor Le Masne on "Orea" and Osian Gwynedd on "Variation with Strings". Tracks 1, 6, 8, 12, and 16–22 are instrumentals.

The Almond & the Seahorse track listing
No.	Title	Length
1.	"Skyward"	1:22
2.	"The Brain and the Body"	3:49
3.	"People Are Pissed"	7:49
4.	"Layer upon Layer"	3:34
5.	"Orea" (with Victor Le Masne)	4:05
6.	"Joe's Theme"	0:45
7.	"Sunshine and Laughter Ever After"	3:53
8.	"Variation with Strings" (with Osian Gwynedd)	0:40
9.	"Amen" (album version)	3:17
10.	"Low Cello"	0:34
11.	"Liberate Me from the Love Song"	3:57
12.	"Love Love Love"	1:23
13.	"I Want My Old Life Back"	2:37
14.	"Forest Waltz"	1:07
15.	"Dance All Your Shadows to Death"	4:43
16.	"Library to Kiss"	3:35
17.	"Staccato with Cello"	0:40
18.	"Small Talk"	3:21
19.	"Toni's Theme"	1:44
20.	"Ffenestr"	5:41
21.	"Penbedw"	2:33
22.	"Arogldarth"	8:15
Total length:		1:09:24

Digital bonus track
No.	Title	Length
23.	"Amen"	3:20
Total length:		1:12:44

== Personnel ==
Credits are adapted from the LP notes and Apple Music.

=== Musicians ===
- Gruff Rhys – Mellotron (1, 9–12, 19–21), percussion (2–4, 16), bass guitar (2, 5–7, 14–15), keyboards (2, 7), vocals (3–5, 7, 9, 11, 13, 15), synthesiser (3–4, 15–16, 18, 22), guitar (4–5, 7, 15–16, 18), drums (4, 6, 14), arrangement (7–8, 14), electric guitar (13, 22), piano (19)
- Hilary Benson – cello (1)
- Gruff Ab Arwel – arrangement (1, 13)
- Osian Gwynedd – piano (2–3, 6, 8–10, 13–14, 16–18), arrangement (8, 14)
- Ali Chant – programming (2, 15)
- Celyn Jones and Rebel Wilson – vocals (2)
- Kliph Scurlock – drums (3, 7, 9, 13, 15)
- N'famady Kouyaté – xylophone (3), percussion and electric guitar (7), marimba (15)
- Steve Black – bass guitar (3, 9), double bass (13)
- Kate Drew – vocals (4)
- Victor Le Masne – piano, synthesiser, and programming (5)
- Gwenllian Hâf MacDonald and Martin Gwilym-Jones – violin (7–8, 13)
- Jess Feaver – cello (7–8, 13)
- Rebecca Jones – viola (7–8, 13)
- Drew Morgan – cello (9–10, 17)
- Kris Jenkins – programming (11)
- Lisa Jên Brown – vocals (15)

=== Technical and design ===
- Gruff Rhys – production (all tracks)
- Victor Le Masne – production and mixing (5)
- Kris Jenkins – production (22), engineering (4, 20), mixing (1, 10–12, 21–22)
- Kliph Scurlock – engineering, mastering, and compiling (all tracks)
- Ritchie Brooks – engineering (1)
- Ali Chant – engineering (4, 10, 13), mixing (2–3, 6–9, 14–19)
- Llion Robertson – engineering (7–8), mixing (13)
- Lisa Jên Brown – engineering (15)
- Chris Shaw – mixing (4)
- Akiko Stehrenberger – artwork
- Philip Laslett – design and layout

== Charts ==
Chart performance for The Almond & the Seahorse
Chart (2023)	Peak position
Scottish Albums (OCC)	69
UK Independent Albums (OCC)	22
UK Soundtrack Albums (OCC)	1
