= Seeking New Gods =

Studio album by Gruff Rhys
- Released: 21 May 2021
- Recorded: October 2018; March 2019
- Studio: Rancho de la Luna (Joshua Tree, California); Playpen (Bristol, England)
- Length: 42:14
- Label: Rough Trade
- Producer: Gruff Rhys

Gruff Rhys chronology
Pang! (2019)	Seeking New Gods (2021)	The Almond & the Seahorse (2023)

Seeking New Gods is the seventh studio album by Welsh musician Gruff Rhys, released on 21 May 2021 under Rough Trade Records. The album was inspired by Paektu Mountain, a volcano on the border of China and North Korea. It received acclaim from critics, and reached number 10 on the UK Albums Chart.

== Critical reception ==
Professional ratings
Aggregate scores
Source	Rating
Metacritic	85/100
Review scores
Source	Rating
AllMusic	4/5 stars
Clash	7/10
Mojo	4/5 stars
MusicOMH	4.5/5 stars
Pitchfork	7.6/10
Uncut	9/10

Seeking New Gods received a score of 85 out of 100 on review aggregator Metacritic based on 11 critics' reviews, indicating "universal acclaim". Uncut wrote, "here are nine songs that confidently mix Station to Station piano, Beach Boys harmonies, Kosmische guitar and even free jazz". Mojo stated that "Rhys excels at holding anxiety and unease up to the light without becoming harsh; Seeking New Gods keeps that balance beautifully".

== Track listing ==
All tracks are written by Gruff Rhys.

Seeking New Gods track listing
No.	Title	Length
1.	"Mausoleum of My Former Self"	4:53
2.	"Can't Carry On"	3:37
3.	"Loan Your Loneliness"	5:21
4.	"Seeking New Gods"	5:10
5.	"Hiking in Lightning"	3:24
6.	"Holiest of the Holy Men"	4:42
7.	"The Keep"	4:23
8.	"Everlasting Joy"	5:10
9.	"Distant Snowy Peaks"	5:34
Total length:		42:14

== Personnel ==
Credits are adapted from the CD liner notes.

=== Musicians ===
- Gruff Rhys – vocals, electric and acoustic guitars, synthesisers, Multibau, arrangement
- Kliph Scurlock – drums, arrangement
- Steve Black – bass, arrangement
- Osian Gwynedd – piano, synthesisers, arrangement
- Lisa Jên, Mirain Hâf – additional vocal harmonies and arrangements
- Gavin Fitzjohn – brass and arrangements

=== Technical and design ===
- Gruff Rhys – production
- Mario Caldato Jr. – mixing at Amor, Los Angeles
- Robert Carranza – mastering (except track 3)
- Jason Mitchell – mastering at Loud (3)
- Kliph Scurlock – file management, compiling, and final mastering at Stiwdio Leckwith, Cardiff
- Ali Chant – recording at Playpen, Bristol (1–2, 9)
- Jon Russo – recording at Rancho de la Luna, Joshua Tree, California (3–8)
- Llion Robertson – recording of additional vocal overdubs in Cardiff
- Mark James – art direction, design

== Charts ==
Chart performance for Seeking New Gods
Chart (2021)	Peak position
Scottish Albums (OCC)	8
UK Albums (OCC)	10
UK Independent Albums (OCC)	3
