= Set Fire to the Stars (soundtrack) =

Soundtrack album by Gruff Rhys
- Released: 30 September 2016
- Studio: Toybox, Bristol; Metropolis, London
- Genre: Jazz; lounge pop; rock 'n' roll
- Length: 42:25
- Label: Twisted Nerve

Gruff Rhys chronology
American Interior (2014)	Set Fire to the Stars (2016)	Babelsberg (2018)

Set Fire to the Stars is a soundtrack album by the Welsh musician Gruff Rhys, composed for the 2014 film of the same name and released on 30 September 2016 through Twisted Nerve Records. It follows his previous studio album American Interior (2014) and is his first full-length soundtrack album.

== Background ==
Set Fire to the Stars is a 2014 film directed by Andy Goddard, whose plot centers around the relationship between the American poet John Malcolm Brinnin and the Welsh poet Dylan Thomas during the latter's visit to New York in the 1950s. With the news that Elijah Wood would star as Brinnin in early January 2014, Gruff Rhys' role as the film's composer was also announced. His first film soundtrack overall, Rhys would compose his second full-length soundtrack for The Almond and the Seahorse (2022). Both films co-star and were co-written by Celyn Jones.

== Recording and composition ==
Around the time of recording, Rhys had also been recording his next solo studio album, American Interior (2014). Paralleling the themes of the film, American Interior focuses on the life of Rhys' ancestor, the Welsh explorer John Evans, and his journeys in the U.S. in the late 18th century. In an effort to avoid any anachronistic qualities between the film and its score, Rhys intentionally limited the scope of the project to instruments that would have existed at the time of the film's setting. The resultant soundtrack has been described by critics as parts jazz, lounge pop, and rock 'n' roll.

Rhys recorded the music at Ali Chant's Toybox Studios in Bristol as part of a self-described "agro-jazz quartet" consisting of himself on guitar, Chris Walmsley on drums, Jim Barr on double bass, and Osian Gwynedd on piano. While much of the soundtrack was performed based on songs and instrumentals that Rhys had written beforehand, some was improvised, such as on "Chop Shop" with Video Loss; the remainder of the improvised material was performed with Gwynedd. The strings that were added were recorded at Metropolis Studios in London, additionally supported by the Elysian Quartet (Note: The string group the Elysian Quartet was miscredited as the Elysium Quartet in the liner notes.) on "John Malcolm Brinnin", "John Adoring at Yale", and "Military Madness". Dialogue from Elijah Wood, Kevin Eldon, and Shirley Henderson is featured on "It Was Hot That Summer", the final piece of the album.

== Release ==
The soundtrack album for Set Fire to the Stars was released on 30 September 2016 through Twisted Nerve Records, an imprint of Finders Keepers. It peaked on the UK Record Store and Soundtrack Charts at no. 18 and no. 17, respectively.

== Critical reception ==
Professional ratings
Aggregate scores
Source	Rating
Metacritic	72/100
Review scores
Source	Rating
The Arts Desk	5/5 stars
The Guardian	4/5 stars
Record Collector	4/5 stars
Uncut	7/10

According to the review aggregator Metacritic, Set Fire to the Stars received "generally favorable reviews" based on a weighted average score of 72 out of 100 from 4 critic scores. In a five star review for The Arts Desk, Barney Harsent found the album "fantastically varied" and "quite possibly the most satisfying thing he's produced yet as a solo artist", focusing on Rhys vocal delivery by saying "On this project, it's the perfect vessel."

Harriet Gibsone of The Guardian gave the soundtrack four stars out of five and thought Rhys made "a subtle and successful deviation" from his usual solo work with a soundtrack "that reminds the listener ... there is a truly maverick – albeit always understated – composer at work." Similarly, Record Collector's Inky Tuscadero expressed that Rhys, in his departure from his more typically pop-oriented work, "nailed it on his first attempt" and said the soundtrack "a poetic grace more than worthy of its subject."

=== Accolades ===
In 2015, Rhys was awarded the BAFTA Cymru award for best Original Music, and in 2017, the album was nominated for the Welsh Music Prize.

Year-end lists
Publication	List	Rank	Ref.
Uncut	75 Best Albums of 2016	64	

== Track listing ==
All tracks are written by Gruff Rhys, with exceptions: "Chop Shop" was improvised by Rhys with Osian Gwynedd, Jim Barr, and Chris Walmsley, and all other improvisations were written by Rhys and Gwynedd; dialogue on "It Was Hot That Summer" was written by Celyn Jones and Andy Goddard; all brass parts were composed by Gavin Fitzjohn.

Set Fire to the Stars track listing
No.	Title	Length
1.	"John Malcolm Brinnin"	0:28
2.	"Set Fire to the Stars"	4:01
3.	"After Hours/Panic"	2:25
4.	"Tremble (Down)"	0:31
5.	"Tremble to the Light"	3:20
6.	"Tremble (Up)"	0:32
7.	"After Hours/Tension"	0:55
8.	"Log Cabin 1"	1:12
9.	"Log Cabin 2"	1:01
10.	"Log Cabin 3"	0:45
11.	"John Adoring at Yale"	0:44
12.	"Set Fire to the Strings"	1:21
13.	"After Hours/Tender"	1:53
14.	"John & the Poem"	1:30
15.	"Chop Shop"	2:41
16.	"Atom Bomb"	1:47
17.	"After Hours/Contentment"	2:48
18.	"Ticking Clock"	2:01
19.	"Military Madness"	1:02
20.	"Caitlin's Theme"	2:37
21.	"Tremble (Joy)"	0:49
22.	"Dylan's Demons"	2:07
23.	"It Was Hot That Summer" (feat. Elijah Wood)	5:55
Total length:		42:25

- The CD release of Set Fire to the Stars included an untitled 44 second-long hidden track after "It Was Hot That Summer".

== Personnel ==
Credits are adapted from the CD liner notes.

=== Musicians ===
- Gruff Rhys – guitar, vocals
- Chris Walmsley – drums
- Jim Barr – double bass
- Osian Gwynedd – piano
- Gruff ab Arwel – string arrangement
- Gavin Fitzjohn – brass
- Jote Osahn, Antonia Pagulatos – violin
- Stella Page – viola
- Lucy Railtin – cello
- Emma Smith, Ros Stephen – additional violin (tracks 1, 11, 19)
- Vince Sipprell – additional viola (1, 11, 19)
- Laura Moody – additional cello (1, 11, 19)
- Erica Daking – extra vocals (2)
- Elijah Wood, Kevin Eldon, Shirley Henderson – dialogue (23)

=== Technical ===
- Ali Chant – mixing and recording (Toybox Studios, Bristol)
- Sam Wheat, Xavier Stephenson – recording of strings (Metropolis Studios, London)
- Sam Harper, Paul Norris – recording assistance (Metropolis)
- Tim Young – mastering (Metropolis)
- Kliph Scurlock – compiling and editing

== Charts ==
Chart performance for Set Fire to the Stars
Chart (2016)	Peak position
UK Record Store (OCC)	18
UK Soundtrack Albums (OCC)	17
