= American Interior =

Studio album by Gruff Rhys
- Released: 5 May 2014
- Recorded: Arc Studios, Omaha, Nebraska and Toybox, Bristol, England
- Genre: Alternative rock
- Length: 46:09
- Label: Turnstile
- Producer: Gruff Rhys, Ali Chant

Gruff Rhys chronology
Hotel Shampoo (2011)	American Interior (2014)	Set Fire to the Stars (2016)

Singles from American Interior
- 1. "American Interior" Released: 28 April 2014

American Interior is the fourth solo album by Gruff Rhys, released on 5 May 2014. It is a concept album based on the life of the explorer John Evans. It peaked at number 24 in the UK.

== Critical reception ==
Professional ratings
Aggregate scores
Source	Rating
Metacritic	79/100
Review scores
Source	Rating
Clash Music	6/10 stars
Drowned in Sound	8/10 stars
The Guardian	5/5 stars
musicOMH	4/5 stars

The album was well received by critics.

== Track listing ==
All tracks are written by Gruff Rhys, except "Allweddellau Allweddol", credited to Gruff Rhys/Traditional.

No.	Title	Length
1.	"American Exterior"	0:28
2.	"American Interior"	3:16
3.	"100 Unread Messages"	4:32
4.	"The Whether (Or Not)"	3:36
5.	"The Last Conquistador"	3:58
6.	"Lost Tribes"	3:01
7.	"Liberty (Is Where We'll Be)"	4:54
8.	"Allweddellau Allweddol" (English translation: Key Keyboards)	4:02
9.	"The Swamp"	4:12
10.	"Iolo"	3:49
11.	"Walk Into the Wilderness"	3:49
12.	"Year of the Dog"	3:30
13.	"Tiger's Tale"	3:11

== Personnel ==
- Gruff Rhys - vocals, bass, acoustic guitar, percussion, keyboard, synths, production, mixing
- Ali Chant - production, engineering (Toybox), mixing, timpani on "The Swamp"
- Mike Mogis - engineering (Arc Studios)
- Kris Jenkins - engineering (Wings for Jesus)
- Andy Votel - production on "Allweddellau Allweddol"
- Guy Davie - mastering
- Gruff ab Arwel - string arrangements
- Kliph Scurlock - drums on "American Interior", "100 Unread Messages", "The Whether (Or Not)", "The Last Conquistador", "Lost Tribes", "Iolo" and "Walk Into the Wilderness"
- Chris Walmsley - drums on "Liberty (Is Where We'll Be)", "The Swamp", "Year of the Dog" and "Tiger's Tale"
- Osian Gwynedd - piano
- Jonathan Thomas - bass on "The Whether (Or Not)"
- Alun Tan Lan - electric lead guitar on "100 Unread Messages", "Year of the Dog" and "Tiger's Tale", electric mandolin on "American Interior"
- Lisa Jen Brown - harmony vocals on "100 Unread Messages"
- Mari Morgan - violin
- Francesca Simmons - violin
- Rebecca Homer - viola
- Elen Ifan - cello
- Maggie Bjorklund - pedal steel guitar on "Liberty (Is Where We'll Be)", "Year of the Dog" and "Tiger's Tale"
- Pete Fowler - artwork and design
- Dylan Goch - photography
- Ryan Owen Eddleston - photography
