= Separado! =

2010 Welsh documentary about Gruff Rhys

- Film poster
- Directed by: Dylan Goch
- Written by: Gruff Rhys
- Produced by: Catryn Ramasut
- Starring: Gruff Rhys; René Griffiths; Tony Da Gatorra; King Creosote
- Cinematography: Dylan Goch
- Edited by: Dylan Goch
- Music by: Gruff Rhys
- Production company: Ie Ie Productions
- Distributed by: Soda Pictures
- Release dates: June 2010 (Los Angeles Film Festival); 30 July 2010 (UK)
- Running time: 84 minutes
- Country: Wales
- Languages: English; Welsh; Spanish; Portuguese
- Budget: £15,000

Separado! is a 2010 Welsh documentary film directed by Dylan Goch and focuses on Gruff Rhys going to South America in search of a distant relative René Griffiths.
