= Alun Tan Lan =

Welsh singer-songwriter

Alun Tan Lan (born Alun Evans and also known as Azza Tazza Lazza) is a Welsh singer-songwriter from the village of Pandy Tudur (nr Abergele).

He sings exclusively through the medium of the Welsh language.

When Azza was 14 he formed the punk rock band Dail Te Pawb, He later went on to join Boff Frank Bough playing bass. He used the pseudonym Alun Evansh in those days (c1990) and also produced a cut 'n' paste punk style fanzine called 'Brwas'

His first album Aderyn Papur was co-produced by Toni Schiavone and Mark Roberts, formerly of Y Cyrff and Catatonia, and was released in 2004 after he returned from living and performing in Ireland.

Alun opened for Gruff Rhys on his 2005 solo tour and is a long-standing member of Rhys's live band. He has also contributed to solo albums by Gorky's Zygotic Mynci front-man Euros Childs and was part of his touring band.

Under his original name Alun Evans, he is also the guitarist for instrumental surf-rock band Y Niwl.

== Awards ==
In 2005 Alun received the BBC Radio Cymru awards for Best Male Artist and Best Composer.

== Solo discography ==
- Aderyn Papur, Rasal, 2004
- Y Distawrwydd, Rasal, 2005
- Yr Aflonydd, Aderyn Papur, 2007
- Cymlau, double album released on soundcloud.com, 2012
