= Babelsberg (album) =

Studio album by Gruff Rhys
- Released: 8 June 2018
- Length: 40:57
- Label: Rough Trade

Gruff Rhys chronology
Set Fire to the Stars (2016)	Babelsberg (2018)	Pang! (2019)

Babelsberg is the fifth studio album by Welsh musician Gruff Rhys. It was released in June 2018 under Rough Trade Records.

Professional ratings
Aggregate scores
Source	Rating
AnyDecentMusic?	7.8/10
Metacritic	82/100
Review scores
Source	Rating
AllMusic	4/5 stars
The Guardian	4/5 stars
DIY Mag	4/5 stars
MusicOMH	4/5 stars
PopMatters	8/10

== Recording ==
Work on Babelsberg began when producer/engineer Ali Chant contacted Rhys in early 2016. Chant's Toybox Studios were about to be demolished by property developers and he offered Rhys some studio time before this happened. Rhys had a batch of new songs, but no record label: Chant's proposal provided the motivation to finish off the lyrics.

Rhys swiftly put together a band from local musicians, comprising former Flaming Lips drummer Kliph Scurlock, pianist Osian Gwynedd and bassist Stephen Black. Over three days of recording in Bristol, the new songs were laid down live in the studio – a working method he'd been developing across the American Interior album and his soundtrack for Set Fire to the Stars. “I wanted to make a live-based record, very simple and straightforward.”

“On the morning of the first recordings I had the worst migraine,” Rhys later said. “I left the building and threw up in the street. I wanted to commit to the lyrics and sing live so I think I was stressed about getting them ready to sing.” The songs reflected Rhys's negative feelings about the state of the world, and after recording was completed “I sat on the songs for almost two years. I didn’t play them to anyone – the songs in their raw state reflected the gloom for me and I was worried they would age badly and seem dated.”

The delay in releasing the songs was partly down to Rhys’ decision to give them some uplift by bringing in orchestral composer Stephen McNeff, with whom he'd been working on an opera about the World War I poet Hedd Wyn. “He could do all those things that are in the ’60s orchestral records I love,” said Rhys. McNeff was busy with other projects and couldn't tackle Babelsberg for 18 months: in the meantime Rhys allayed his concern over the songs becoming dated by playing them once a month. He also wrote an extra song, “Selfies In The Sunset”, which was initially recorded with just Rhys on vocals before being reworked as a duet with Lily Cole.

By the time the accompaniment from the BBC National Orchestra Of Wales was recorded, “the world was still pretty bad,” so Rhys felt the songs still stood up. The album's artwork was created by Uno Moralez.

On 29 August 2020 Rhys released (Don’t) Welcome The Plague As A Blessing / The Babelsberg Basement Files, a vinyl-only LP for Record Store Day, featuring the original recordings of the tracks from Babelsberg, without the orchestral overdubs, in the same sequence as the finished record.

== Track listing ==
No.	Title	Length
1.	"Frontier Man"	3:35
2.	"The Club"	4:03
3.	"Oh Dear!"	3:16
4.	"Limited Edition Heart"	3:38
5.	"Take That Call"	3:42
6.	"Drones in the City"	3:49
7.	"Negative Vibes"	5:15
8.	"Same Old Song"	4:09
9.	"Architecture of Amnesia"	4:41
10.	"Selfies in the Sunset"	4:49

== Accolades ==
Publication	Accolade	Rank	Ref.
Drift Records	Top 100 Albums of 2018	55	
Fopp	Top 100 Albums of 2018	71	
Mojo	Top 75 Albums of 2018	32	
Rough Trade	Top 100 Albums of 2018	98	
Uncut	Top 75 Albums of 2018	7	

== Charts ==
Chart	Peak position
UK Albums (OCC)	23
