= Ffa Coffi Pawb =

Welsh rock band (1986–1992)

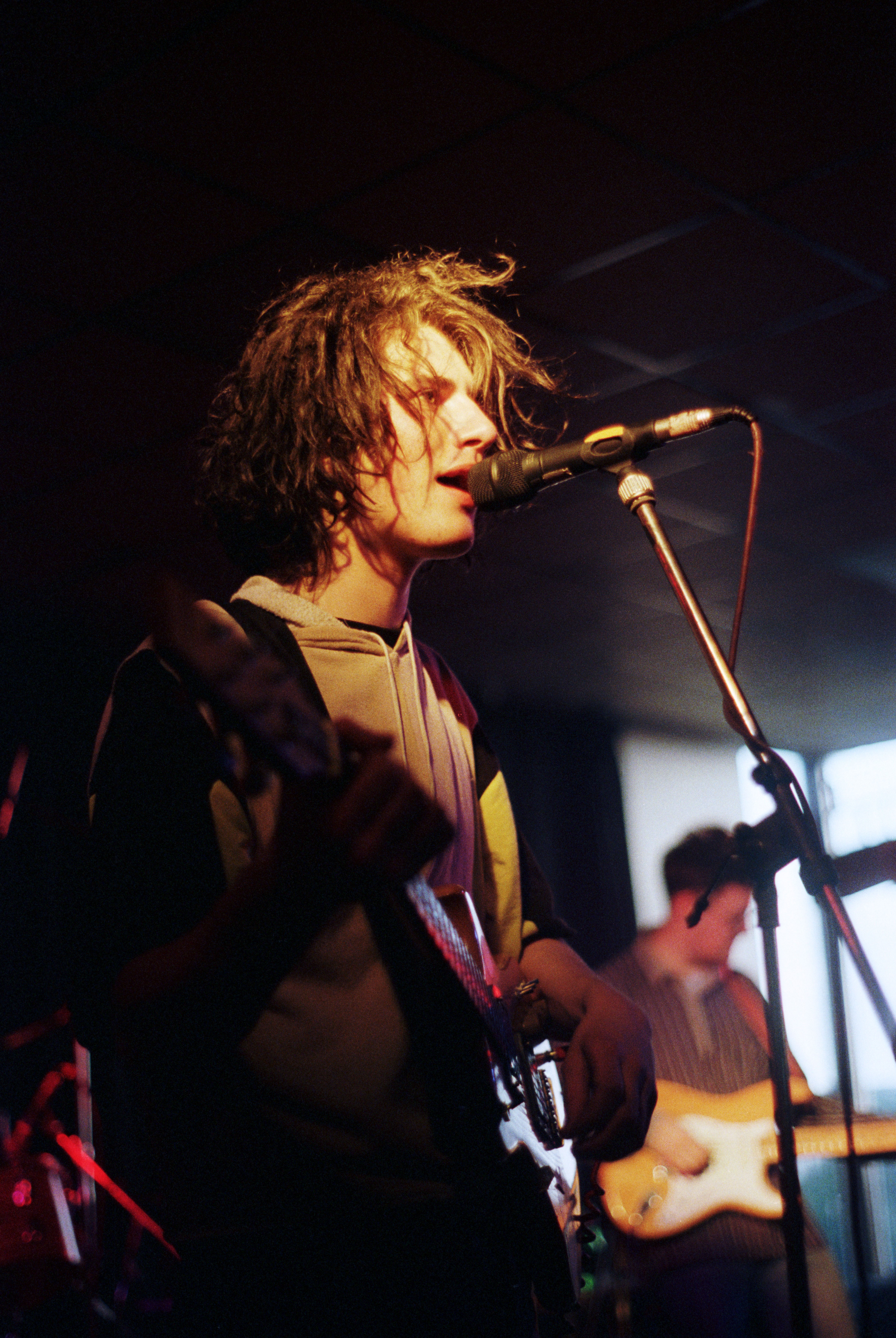
- Gruff Rhys performing with Ffa Coffi Pawb at Roc Ystwyth, 1989

Background information
- Origin: Bethesda, Wales
- Genres: Neo-psychedelia, alternative rock, indie rock
- Years active: 1986–1992
- Labels: Ankst; Placid Casual; Ara Deg
- Past members: Gruff Rhys; Rhodri Puw; Dewi Emlyn; Dafydd Ieuan

Ffa Coffi Pawb (Welsh: "Everybody's Coffee Beans", phonetically Welsh: "Fuck Off, Everyone" [ˈfɑː ˈkɔfɪ ˈpaub]) was a band signed to Welsh music label, Ankst, active from 1986 to 1992.

The band was made up of singer and guitarist Gruff Rhys (later of Super Furry Animals), drummer Dafydd Ieuan (also later of Super Furry Animals), Rhodri Puw (later of Gorky's Zygotic Mynci) and Dewi Emlyn (later tour manager for Gorky's Zygotic Mynci and Super Furry Animals). One of the band's tracks, "Dacw Hi", was eventually covered by the Furries on their Welsh language album Mwng.

The band released three albums, Clymhalio, Dalec Peilon and Hei Vidal!. In 2004, a compilation drawn from their albums was released under the title Am Byth ("Forever") on the Placid Casual label, with renewed interest from the success of Super Furry Animals. From 2023 to 2025, all three albums would eventually be remastered by Kliph Scurlock and issued on CD and vinyl through the Ara Deg label.

== Discography ==
Studio albums

- Dalec Peilon (1988)
- Clymhalio (1991)
- Hei Vidal! (1992)

Compilation albums

- Am Byth (2004)

Singles

- "Gwanwyn Yn Detroit" (1989)
- "Cymryd y Pys" (1992)
