= Y Niwl =

Welsh surf music group

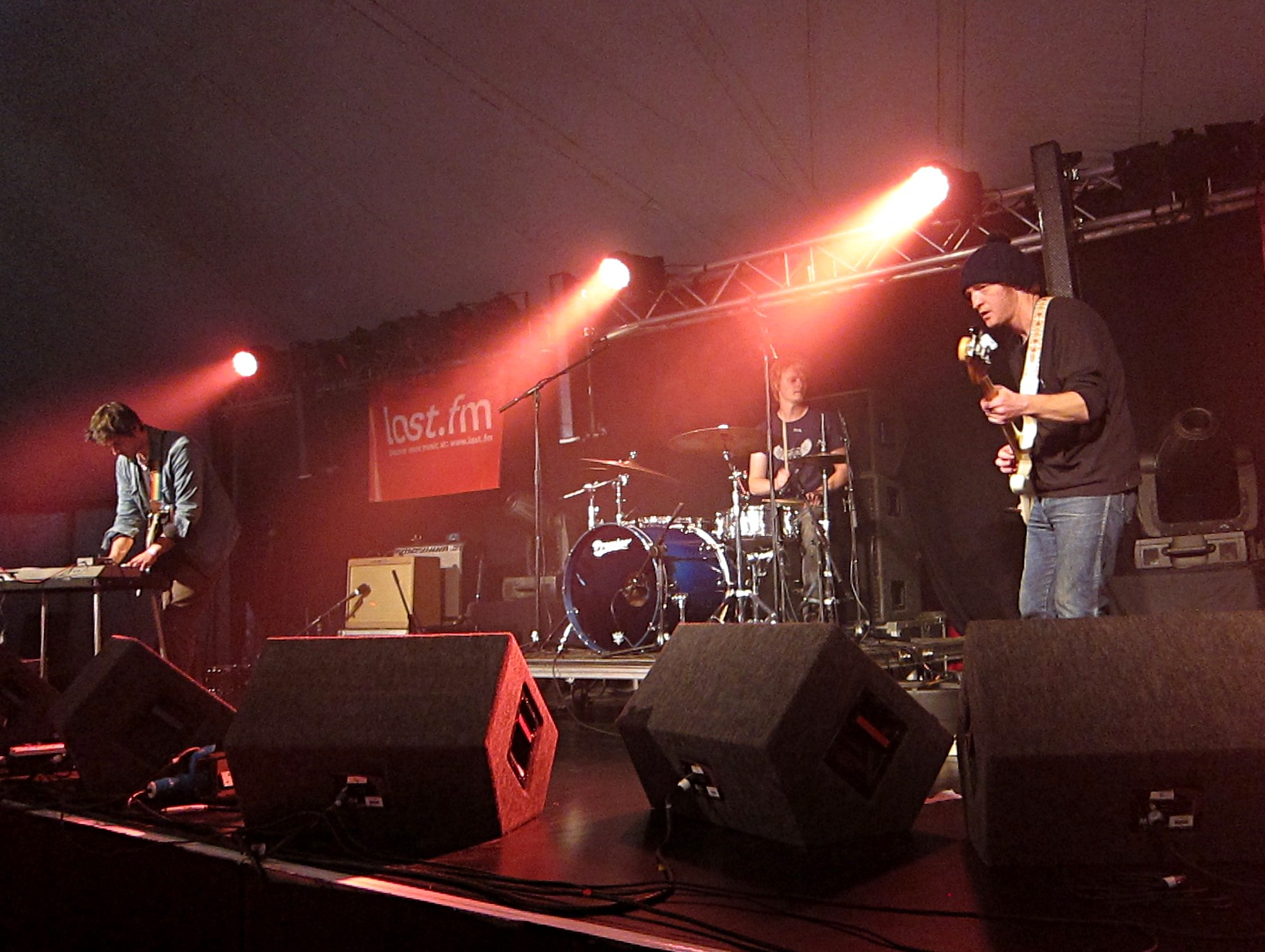
- Performing at the Summer Sundae festival 2012

Background information
- Origin: Gwynedd, north Wales
- Genres: Surf
- Years active: 2009-present
- Labels: Aderyn Papur
- Members: Alun Evans, Llyr Pari, Sion Glyn, Gruff ab Arwel
- Past members: Pete Richardson
- Website: yniwl.com

Y Niwl are a surf instrumental band from North Wales, formed in 2009. Its members are Alun Evans (guitar), Llyr Pari (drums), Sion Glyn (bass) and Gruff ab Arwel (organ and guitar). The band's name is pronounced Uh Nule and means 'The Fog' in Welsh. Members of the band have also long played as backing musicians for Gruff Rhys.

== Career ==
Evans has said about the band: "It's essentially not complicated music, it's just rock 'n' roll basically, simple and raw. I still don’t have much of a collection of surf music and I was never really into that particular style of music in the past. The only thing I really had was an old Shadows album on tape... Most of our material is edited jams... We usually record ourselves jamming then take out the best bits and form a song. Other times, someone will come up with an idea and we’ll work around that".

The band's debut album, Y Niwl, was released on 29 November 2010 on the Aderyn Papur label with artwork by Llyr Pierce. It was recorded at Bryn Derwen studios and engineered by David Wrench. The song titles are numbers in Welsh, but do not reflect the order of the tracklisting. Evans explained: "When we started writing the songs we named them numerically in order, just to make it practical. But then when we wanted to change the track listing of the album around, we couldn’t rename the songs so we stuck with the songs and their numerical titles".

Y Niwl was named The Sunday Times Album of the Week on 2 January 2011 and received 7/10 in reviews by the NME and Drowned in Sound. The track "Undegpedwar" was used as the theme tune to the BBC television show Football Focus.

Y Niwl kept a low profile as a band for a couple of years following single releases in 2012 but have sporadically performed gigs. Their second album 5, which has been in process since 2013, was released in February 2018. It was recorded by Iwan Morgan in Stiwdio Mandi Hebron. All tracks are instrumentals, Tridegun (31), Tridegchwech (36), Tridegpump (35), Dauddegwyth (28), Tridegpedwar (34), Dauddegchech (26), Dauddegsaith (27), Dauddegnaw (29), Tridegtri (33) and Trideg (30).
