= Sadness Sets Me Free =

Studio album by Gruff Rhys
- Released: 26 January 2024
- Recorded: March 2022
- Studio: La Frette (La Frette-sur-Seine, France); Delta (Paris, France); Melodium (Paris, France); Ystum Tâf Scouts Hall (Cardiff, Wales)
- Genre: Psychedelic pop
- Length: 42:37
- Label: Rough Trade
- Producer: Gruff Rhys; Maxime Kosinetz

Gruff Rhys chronology
The Almond & the Seahorse (2023)	Sadness Sets Me Free (2024)	Dim Probs (2025)

Sadness Sets Me Free is the eighth studio album by Welsh musician Gruff Rhys, released on 26 January 2024 through Rough Trade Records. It was recorded in three days in March 2022 in Paris, and received positive reviews from critics.

== Recording ==
Recording took place at La Frette studio in Paris, France, where Rhys and his band recorded the album in three days in March 2022.

== Critical reception ==
Professional ratings
Aggregate scores
Source	Rating
Metacritic	84/100
Review scores
Source	Rating
The Arts Desk	4/5 stars
The Irish Times	4/5 stars
Louder Than War	4/5
Mojo	4/5 stars
MusicOMH	4.5/5 stars
Uncut	4/5 stars

Sadness Sets Me Free received a score of 84 out of 100 on review aggregator Metacritic based on eight critics' reviews, indicating "universal acclaim". Mojo's James McNair wrote that "though it stops well short of the ardent self-loathing that fired Radiohead's Creep, a pronounced seam of self-criticism runs through" the album, despite concluding that "the music is often uplifting; a stoical and pro-active salve against troubles local and global". Uncut's Pete Paphides observed that "on an album of songs that 'feel melancholic or... deal with shit things,' it's important to state that, at no point, does the listener feel like they're taking a holiday in someone else's misery". Reviewing the album for The Irish Times, Siobhán Kane felt that the album "can sound both disconcerting and comforting".

Joe Muggs of The Arts Desk found the songs to have a "subdued nature" but called them "so damn good, they could take a lot more lavishness and sparkle. As it is, though, this is a weird, inspiring and very lovely record". Nathan Whittle of Louder Than War wrote that on Sadness Sets Me Free, "Gruff Rhys delivers a spellbindingly oxymoronic display; the low-key nature of the songs results in grandness, the darkness of the content providing hope". MusicOMH's Ben Hogwood opined regarding the song titles that "on paper, songs of this ilk should be weighing the listener down, but the reality is different as Rhys realises his ideas in music of blissful freedom".

=== Year-end lists ===
Select year-end rankings for Sadness Sets Me Free
Publication	Accolade	Rank	Ref.
Mojo	The Best Albums of 2024	21	

== Track listing ==
All tracks are written by Gruff Rhys.

Sadness Sets Me Free track listing
No.	Title	Length
1.	"Sadness Sets Me Free"	5:23
2.	"Bad Friend"	2:54
3.	"Celestial Candyfloss"	3:58
4.	"Silver Lining (Lead Balloons)"	3:58
5.	"On the Far Side of the Dollar"	4:54
6.	"They Sold My Home to Build a Skyscraper"	3:04
7.	"Peace Signs"	5:05
8.	"Cover Up the Cover Up"	5:48
9.	"I Tendered My Resignation"	5:07
10.	"I'll Keep Singing"	2:26
Total length:		42:37

== Personnel ==
Credits are adapted from the CD liner notes.

=== Musicians ===
- Gruff Rhys – vocals, electric and acoustic guitars, synthesisers
- Kliph Scurlock – drums
- Osian Gwynedd – piano
- Huw V. Williams – double bass
- Gruff Ab Arwel – strings arrangement
- Gwenllian Hâf MacDonald and Martin Gwilym-Jones – violin
- Jess Feaver – cello
- Rebecca Jones – viola
- Rhodri Brooks – pedal steel guitar and arrangement (1, 8–9)
- Kate Stables – additional vocals (1, 8, 10)
- Pedro Barios – additional percussion (3, 5–6)
- Gavin Fitzjohn – horns and arrangement (4, 10)

=== Technical and design ===
- Gruff Rhys – production
- Maxime Kosinetz – production, recording (La Frette Studio, La Frette-sur-Seine, France), mixing (MMM, Marseille, France)
- Llion Robertson – string section, pedal steel, and brass recording (Ystum Tâf Scouts Hall, Cardiff, Wales)
- Chab – mastering (Chab Mastering, Paris, France)
- Marie Prieprzownik – vinyl cut (Translab Studios, Paris, France)
- Samuel Borst – technical assistance
- Kliph Scurlock – file management
- Mark James – art direction, design

== Charts ==
Chart performance for Sadness Sets Me Free
Chart (2024)	Peak position
Scottish Albums (OCC)	7
UK Albums (OCC)	22
UK Independent Albums (OCC)	5
