= Pang! (album) =

Studio album by Gruff Rhys
- Released: 13 September 2019
- Length: 29:44
- Languages: Welsh; Zulu
- Label: Rough Trade
- Producer: Muzi

Gruff Rhys chronology
| Babelsberg (2018) | Pang! (2019) | Seeking New Gods (2021) |

Pang! is the sixth studio album by Welsh musician Gruff Rhys. It was released on 13 September 2019 under Rough Trade Records.

== Critical reception ==
Professional ratings
Aggregate scores
| Source | Rating |
|---|---|
| Metacritic | 80/100 |
Review scores
| Source | Rating |
| AllMusic | 4/5 stars |
| The Guardian | 4/5 stars |
| MusicOMH | 4/5 stars |
| Paste | 7.9/10 |

Pang! was met with generally favorable reviews from critics. At Metacritic, which assigns a weighted average rating out of 100 to reviews from mainstream publications, this release received an average score of 80, based on 12 reviews.

== Track listing ==
Pang! track listing
| No. | Title | Length |
|---|---|---|
| 1. | "Pang!" | 2:48 |
| 2. | "Bae Bae Bae" | 4:11 |
| 3. | "Digidigol" | 3:04 |
| 4. | "Ara Deg" | 2:35 |
| 5. | "Eli Haul" | 2:36 |
| 6. | "Niwl O Anwiredd" | 3:49 |
| 7. | "Taranau Mai" | 3:35 |
| 8. | "Ol Bys/Nodau Clust" | 3:55 |
| 9. | "Annedd I'm Danedd" | 3:11 |

== Charts ==
Chart performance for Pang!
| Chart (2019) | Peak position |
|---|---|
| Scottish Albums (Official Charts) | 32 |
| UK Albums (Official Charts) | 81 |
