= John Evans (explorer) =

Welsh explorer

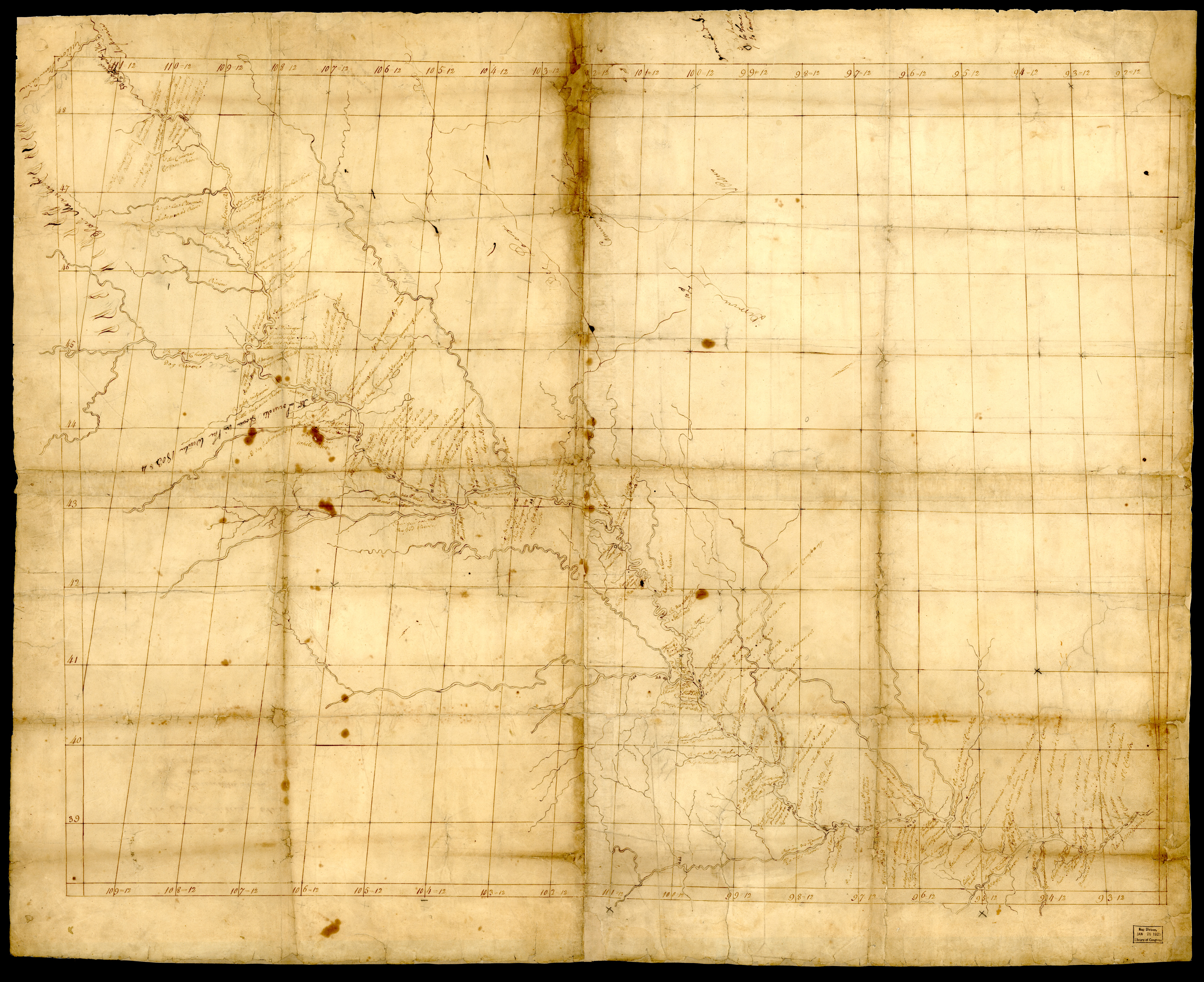
Evans's map

John Thomas Evans (April 1770 – May 1799) was a Welsh explorer who produced an early map of the Missouri River.

Evans was born in Waunfawr, near Caernarfon. In the early 1790s there was an upsurge of interest in Wales in the story of Madog having discovered America, and there were persistent rumours in North America of the existence of a tribe of Welsh Indians, identified with the Mandan. Iolo Morganwg had originally intended to explore the Missouri to discover these Welsh Indians, and Evans was to have gone with him. However, Iolo withdrew from the expedition and Evans embarked for the United States alone, arriving in Baltimore in October 1792. In the spring of 1793 he made his way to St. Louis in Spanish Louisiana, where he was imprisoned for a while on suspicion of being a British spy.

In April 1795 he set off on an expedition with Spanish backing to explore the Missouri and to try to discover a route to the Pacific Ocean from its headwaters. He found the Mandan in 1796, and spent the winter with them before returning to St. Louis in 1797. Gwyn A. Williams quoted Evans as writing "Thus having explored and charted the Missurie for 1,800 miles and by my Communications with the Indians this side of the Pacific Ocean from 35 to 49 Degrees of Latitude, I am able to inform you that there is no such people as the Welsh Indians." He produced a map showing the course of the river. This map, passed on by Thomas Jefferson, was later used by the Lewis and Clark Expedition.

Evans remained in the service of the Spanish authorities, but died in New Orleans in May 1799.

== In popular culture ==
In 2014, the history of John Evans gained renewed popular interest as the topic of a book, film, album and mobile application, all entitled American Interior, created and produced by Welsh musician Gruff Rhys, vocalist with Super Furry Animals.
