= Yr Atal Genhedlaeth =

Studio album by Gruff Rhys
- Released: 24 January 2005
- Genre: Alternative rock
- Length: 29:31
- Language: Welsh
- Label: Placid Casual
- Producer: Gorwel Owen and Gruff Rhys

Gruff Rhys chronology
Yr Atal Genhedlaeth (2005)	Candylion (2007)

Professional ratings
Aggregate scores
Source	Rating
Metacritic	69/100
Review scores
Source	Rating
AllMusic	4/5 stars
Pitchfork	7.8/10

Yr Atal Genhedlaeth is the debut solo album by Super Furry Animals frontman Gruff Rhys. Entirely in the Welsh language, the title of the album and many of the songs are plays on words and puns that might not be obvious even to a Welsh-speaker:

- Yr Atal Genhedlaeth – Pun on 'atalgenhedlu', which is Welsh for a contraceptive.
- Gwn Mi Wn – 'I Know [that] I Know'.
- Epynt – named after a mountain in Mid Wales, but about money, with the 'E' standing for the Euro, and 'pynt' sounding similar to the Welsh word for Pound.
- Rhagluniaeth Ysgafn – Means "light providence". The song isabout asking for mercy in passing from this world to the next. Talks of the good and bad deeds carried out in life and the pleading for mercy.
- Pwdin Ŵy 1 & 2 – literally 'egg pudding', means "egg custard", two love songs.
- Y Gwybodusion – 'The Experts'
- Caerffosiaeth – literally 'sewage fortress'. 'Caer' is a common part of Welsh place-names (for example, Caergybi), used to indicate that there was originally a castle or fortress in the town/city.
- Ambell Waith – 'Sometimes'.
- Ni Yw Y Byd – 'We Are the World'.
- Chwarae'n Troi'n Chwerw – 'When Play Turns Bitter', from a Welsh proverb. A Welsh language standard originally written and sung by Caryl Parry-Jones.

== Track listing ==
All songs by Gruff Rhys unless otherwise stated.

1. "Yr Atal Genhedlaeth" – 0:08
2. "Gwn Mi Wn" – 2:33
3. "Epynt" – 1:48
4. "Rhagluniaeth Ysgafn" – 2:55
5. "Pwdin Ŵy 1" – 1:42
6. "Pwdin Ŵy 2" – 3:13
7. "Y Gwybodusion" – 1:52
8. "Caerffosiaeth" – 2:58
9. "Ambell Waith" – 2:22
10. "Ni Yw Y Byd" – 3:56
11. "Chwarae'n Troi'n Chwerw" (Caryl Parry Jones) – 6:04
