= Am Byth =

Compilation album by Ffa Coffi Pawb
- Released: 16 August 2004 (UK); 1 March 2005 (US)
- Recorded: 1986–1992
- Genre: Alternative rock
- Length: 62:33
- Labels: Placid Casual (UK), Empyrean (US)

Ffa Coffi Pawb chronology
Hei Vidal! (1992)	Am Byth (2004)

Professional ratings
Review scores
Source	Rating
Pitchfork Media	7/10 stars
PopMatters	7/10 stars

Am Byth is a compilation album by the Welsh band Ffa Coffi Pawb. It was released in 2004 and includes songs recorded by the band between 1986 and 1992.

== Track listing ==
Original release in brackets.

No.	Title	Length
1.	"Valium" (Dalec Peilon, 1988)	2:21
2.	"Allan O'I Phen" (Recorded for Fideo 9, released on 12", 1990 and Clymhalio, 1991)	2:52
3.	"Breichiau Hir" (Clymhalio, 1991)	3:35
4.	"Gafael Yn Dynn" (Hei Mr DJ compilation, 1991)	1:54
5.	"Sega Segur" (Hei Vidal!, 1992)	3:20
6.	"Arwynebol Melyn" (Hei Vidal!, 1992)	2:51
7.	"Lluchia Dy Fflachlwch Drosta I" (Hei Vidal!, 1992)	4:31
8.	"Gweld Dim Byd" (Clymhalio, 1991)	4:36
9.	"Llosgi'n Nhy I Lawr" (Siwgwr album Torrwyr Beddau Byd Eang Cyf, 1986)	0:42
10.	"Ffarout" (Hei Vidal!, 1992)	2:46
11.	"Gwneud Fy Mhen I Fewn" (Dalec Peilon, 1988)	2:06
12.	"Gwn" (Flexidisc split with the band Terry Waite A'r Asid, 1989)	2:42
13.	"Hydref Yn Sacramento" (Clymhalio, 1991)	4:10
14.	"Colli'r Goriad" (Hei Vidal!, 1992)	5:39
15.	"Mynd I Lawr" (Dalec Peilon, 1988)	2:35
16.	"Dw I'n Troi 'N Ffrwyth" (12", 1989)	13:06
17.	"Tocyn" (Uncredited bonus track)
