= Gruff Rhys =

Welsh musician and filmmaker (born 1970)

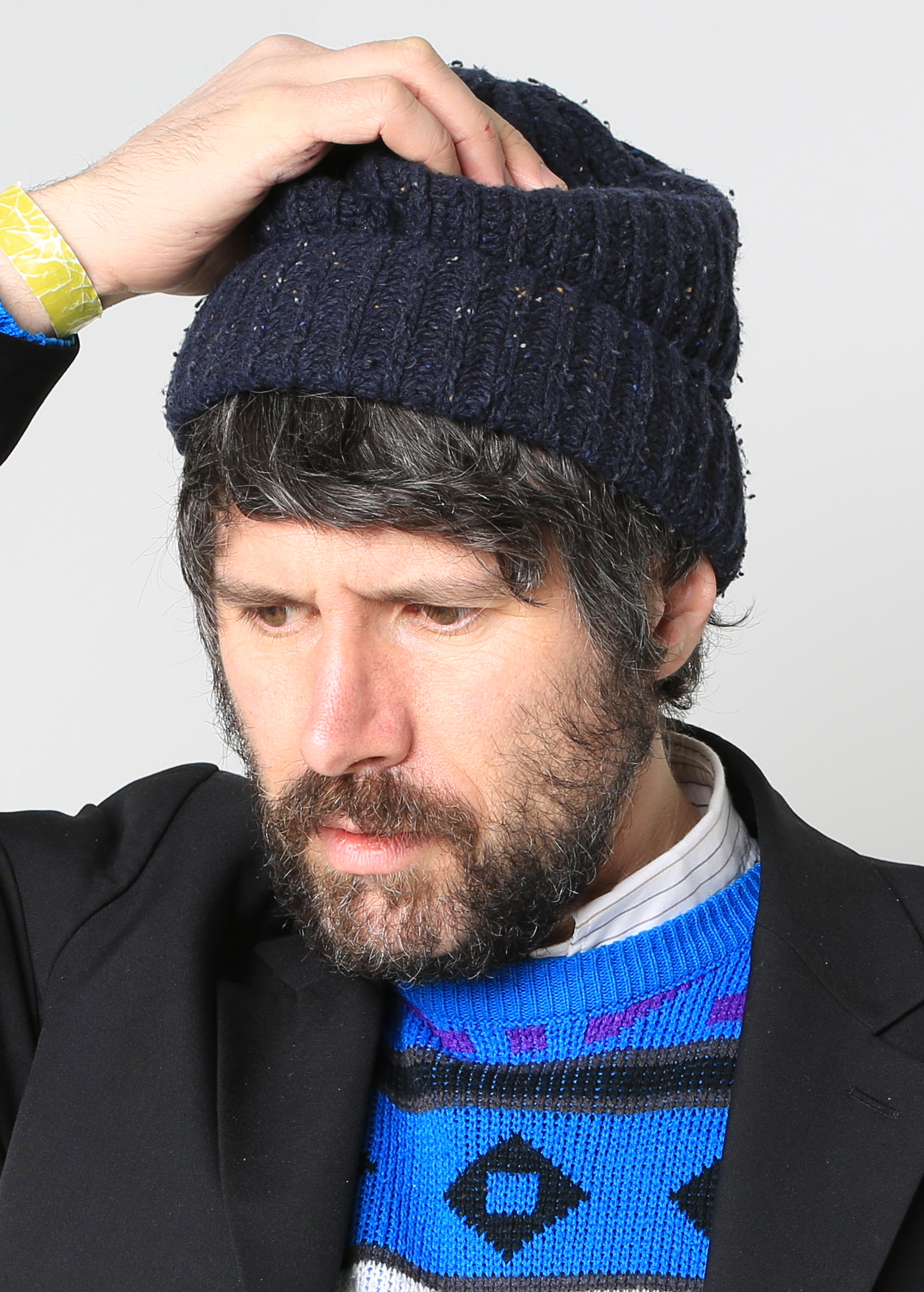
- Rhys in 2015

Background information
- Born: Gruffudd Maredudd Bowen Rhys; 18 July 1970 (age 56); Haverfordwest, Pembrokeshire, Wales
- Origin: Bethesda, Wales
- Occupations: Musician, songwriter, filmmaker, author, producer
- Instruments: Guitar, vocals, keyboard, saz, harmonica, drums, bass
- Years active: 1988–present
- Labels: Turnstile, Rough Trade, Team Love
- Member of: Super Furry Animals; Neon Neon
- Formerly of: Ffa Coffi Pawb
- Website: gruffrhys.com
- Education: Ysgol Dyffryn Ogwen
- Alma mater: Manchester Metropolitan University
- Father: Ioan Bowen Rees

Gruffudd Maredudd Bowen Rhys (Welsh pronunciation: [ˈɡrɨ̞fɨ̞ð maˈrɛdɨ̞ð ˈbowɛn ˈr̥ɨːs]; born 18 July 1970) is a Welsh musician, composer, producer, filmmaker and author. He performs solo and with several bands, including Super Furry Animals, which obtained mainstream success in the 1990s. He formed the electro-pop outfit Neon Neon with Boom Bip. Their album Stainless Style was nominated for the 2008 Nationwide Mercury Prize. He won the 2011 Welsh Music Prize for his album Hotel Shampoo, which was followed up by American Interior in 2014, accompanied by a film, a book and a mobile app. His most recent album, Dim Probs, was released in 2025. He is considered a figurehead of the era known as Cool Cymru.

== Early life ==
Rhys was born 18 July 1970 in Haverfordwest, Wales. He has a brother and a sister; his father was Ioan Bowen Rees (13 January 1929 – 4 May 1999), a "poet, essayist, polemicist, mountaineer, internationalist ... and a White Robe Druid of the Gorsedd of Bards". Bowen Rees "campaigned all his life for Welsh rights, language and culture" although he did not believe in the narrow view of nationalism, glorifying one country over another, rather that the "battle for Wales is the battle for all small nations, all small communities, all individuals in the age of genocide". Rhys's mother, Margaret Wynn Meredith, shared his father's love of writing and was a poet.

Rhys was educated at Ysgol Dyffryn Ogwen, Bethesda, Gwynedd, North Wales and was awarded a degree in art at Manchester Metropolitan University.

== Musical career ==
=== Ffa Coffi Pawb ===
As a teenager in 1985, Gruff Rhys played drums for the North Wales band, Machlud, appearing at the Pesda Roc festival in Bethesda. After playing drums for the band Emily, Rhys found fame in Wales as the front man of Ffa Coffi Pawb. Translated, the name means 'everyone's coffee beans', though if said quickly in Welsh, it can sound like 'fuck off everyone' in English and Welsh combined.

On signing to Ankstmusik, Ffa Coffi Pawb became one of the leading bands on the Welsh music scene during the Cool Cymru movement, and released three albums – Clymhalio, Dalec Peilon and Hei Vidal!.

Rhys plays the guitar in an unusual style. Although he is right-handed, he learned to play left-handed on his brother's left-handed guitar. Once his brother left home, Rhys only had access to a right-handed guitar. As he had already learned to play left-handed, and rather than invert the nut and re-string it, he taught himself to play the right-handed guitar upside down so the bass strings are on the bottom. Today, Rhys still plays left-handed on an upside down right-handed guitar.

=== Super Furry Animals ===
When Ffa Coffi Pawb disbanded in 1993, Rhys and drummer Dafydd Ieuan, of Rhoscefnhir, Anglesey, who had played for Catatonia, Anhrefn, Hanner Pei and many other Welsh language bands, formed the basis of Super Furry Animals. They soon settled on a line-up consisting of Rhys on vocals and guitar, Ieuan on drums, his brother Cian Ciaran (formerly of WWZZ) on keyboards, Huw Bunford (formerly of U-Thant) on guitar and Guto Pryce on bass. This line-up has remained constant to the present day, although the role of each member has become more flexible, particularly in the studio.

In 1995, following a couple of largely Welsh-language EPs on the Ankst label, they signed to Creation Records. Apparently, when offering them the deal after a gig, Alan McGee, head of Creation, asked that they sing more songs in English. Rhys pointed out that all the songs that night had been in English. Super Furry Animals went on to release their critically acclaimed first album, Fuzzy Logic, in 1996 – the first time Rhys had recorded in English. He later observed that his singing sounded like a random collection of accents – but it was nevertheless very successful.

Follow-up albums included Radiator in 1997, Guerrilla in 1999 and Mwng in 2000. They also became particularly famous for their 40-foot inflatable bears and a blue tank with 'SFA' written upon it which toured summer festivals playing techno music at high volume. Super Furry Animals made a further mark on history in July 2001, when they released their first album for the Sony label, Rings Around the World, on CD and DVD simultaneously. They repeated this for 2003's Phantom Power. Unfortunately 2005's Love Kraft performed poorly commercially and Super Furry Animals agreed to leave Sony. They are presently signed to Rough Trade and released Hey Venus! in 2007 in the UK. In 2009 they released their latest record to date, entitled Dark Days/Light Years.

=== Solo ===
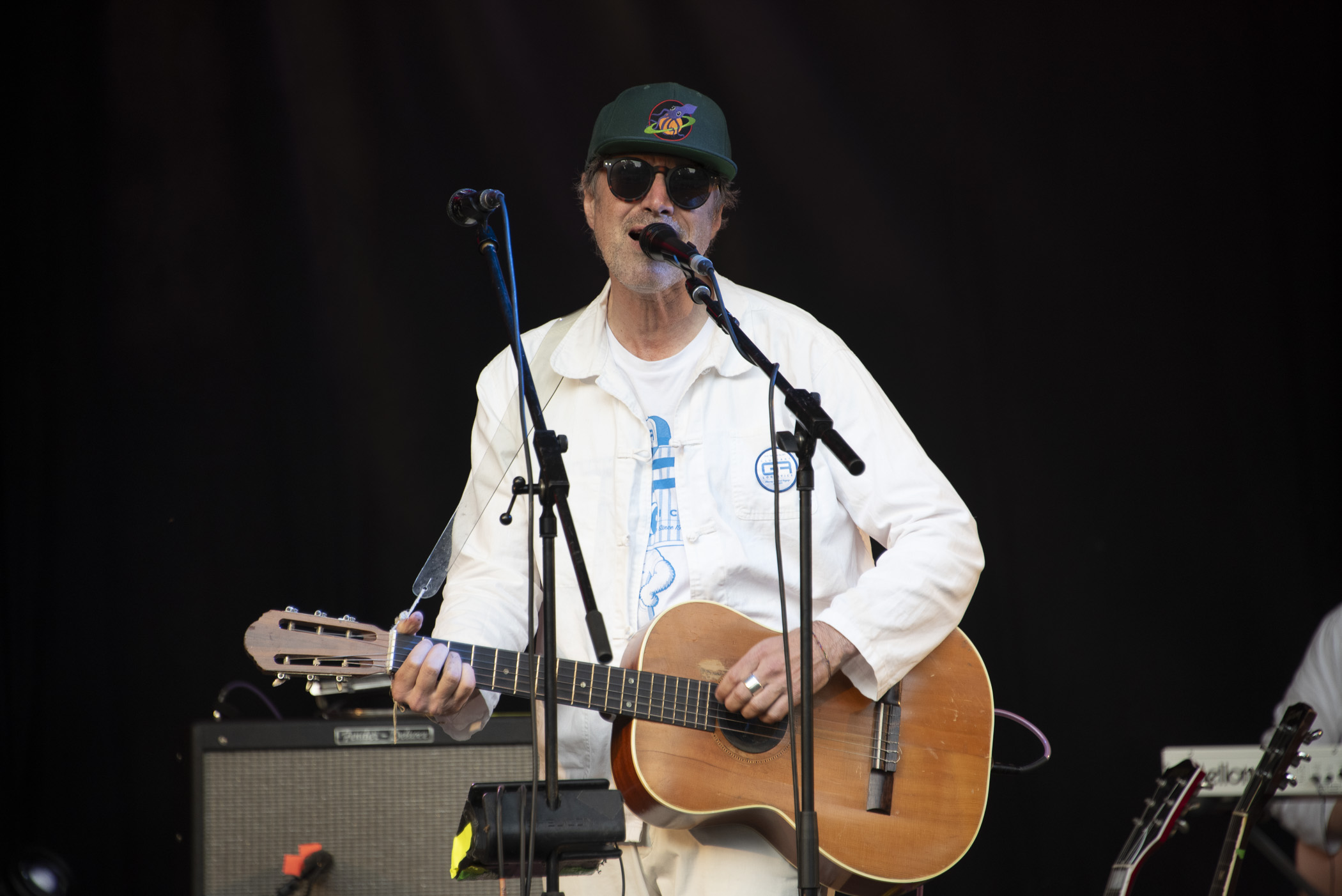
Gruff Rhys performing at End of the Road, Dorset, England on 30th August 2024

On 24 January 2005, Rhys released his first solo album, Yr Atal Genhedlaeth, on the Placid Casual label. It was a loose, sketchy, all-Welsh-language album, with most of the instruments played by Rhys. A tour of Wales and several festival appearances followed. After Super Furry Animals signed to Rough Trade, the new label agreed to take on his solo works as well, and on 8 January 2007 they released Candylion, a batch of acoustic pop songs in English, Spanish and Welsh, which Rhys wrote whilst touring Love Kraft but which did not fit with the direction of the new Super Furry Animals album. A third solo album by Rhys, Hotel Shampoo, was released on 14 February 2011. On 4 March 2011, it was announced that Rhys would be playing at Glastonbury 2011.

In May 2014, Rhys released his new work, American Interior (I Grombil Cyfandir Pell), a combined project of an album, a film, a hardback book and an app for mobile devices. The film was co-directed by Dylan Goch, who also worked with Rhys on his previous film, Separado! (2010).

From December 2015 to January 2016, Rhys fronted a co-production with National Theatre Wales titled "The Insatiable, Inflatable Candylion", featuring songs from Candylion and several new tracks. The music and lyrics were by Gruff Rhys and the play's text, which included audience participation, by Tim Price. The musicians appearing with Rhys were Lisa Jên Brown (who also sang on the original album), Sweet Baboo, Emma Daman Thomas and Kliph Scurlock. The show also included actors Remy Beasley, Matthew Bulgo, Dyfan Dwyfor, Natasha Lewis and Dyfrig Morris.

On 21 April 2016, Rhys released a new song entitled "I Love EU", a song praising the European Union ahead of the EU Referendum on 23 June 2016.

Rhys released his fifth album, entitled Babelsberg, on 8 June 2018. A further album, "Pang!", was released on 13 September 2019, produced by South African DJ Muzi.

=== Neon Neon ===
In 2007 Rhys launched a new electro-pop collaborative project with Boom Bip under the collective moniker Neon Neon. Their album, titled Stainless Style, is a loose concept album based on the tumultuous life of DeLorean Motor Company founder John DeLorean, and was released on 18 March 2008 via Lex Records. The album includes a number of high-profile guest appearances from Fab Moretti of The Strokes, Har Mar Superstar, Yo Majesty, Spank Rock, Cate Le Bon and The Magic Numbers. The first single, "Raquel", was released on 26 November 2007. The follow-up single "I Lust U", featured fellow Welsh artist Cate Le Bon on vocals. The album was nominated for the 2008 Mercury Prize.

On 29 April 2013, Neon Neon released their second studio album, Praxis Makes Perfect, followed by a limited run of live performances featuring actors from National Theatre Wales. The album and live show are based on the life of Giangiacomo Feltrinelli.

=== Collaborations with other artists ===
Rhys has occasionally collaborated with other artists, providing vocals for the track "Dial: Revenge" on the Mogwai album Rock Action as well as guesting on the songs "Fear of Guitars" (from the album Machine Says Yes by FC Kahuna) and "Do's and Don'ts" (by Boom Bip) as well as "Just War" from Danger Mouse and Sparklehorse's album Dark Night of the Soul. He has also featured on the Myspace remix track "I'm Not Lying" by Goldie Lookin' Chain. He features on the track "Cream Dream" from the 2009 Simian Mobile Disco album Temporary Pleasure. He also eats carrots on the Misty's Big Adventure album Television's People, continuing the vegetable relay started by Brian Wilson on Smile. Miles Kane has also called for him to produce the next album by his band the Rascals. Rhys also collaborated with influential hip-hop group De La Soul on the Gorillaz track "Superfast Jellyfish" from their third studio album, Plastic Beach. He later provided vocals on the song "Shadowy Light" on Gorillaz 2026 album, The Mountain. In 2011 he provided vocals on the song "We Won't be Broke Forever Baby" on Akira the Don's LP The Life Equation.

In 2010 he released an album with Brazilian artist Tony da Gatorra on Turnstile Music. The album featured both compositions by Tony da Gatorra, who is relatively unknown in his native Brazil, and Gruff Rhys.

On 17 December 2011, Rhys joined Manic Street Preachers on stage during the band's 38 song A Night of National Treasures one-off live event at the O2 Arena in London to provide the lead vocals for the song Let Robeson Sing. Introducing Rhys to the stage, lead singer James Dean Bradfield explained that Rhys had been set to perform the song at the band's 2001 performance in Havana, Cuba but circumstances had prevented this from happening.

=== Documentaries ===
In 2010, Dylan Goch's film Separado! premiered. It is a documentary about Gruff Rhys's trip to Patagonia to try to locate members of his family whose ancestors had emigrated in Victorian times.

In 2014, the pair co-directed a film about the Welsh explorer John Evans, American Interior. It was released in cinemas in the UK on 9 May 2014.

=== Computer game music ===
In 2011 Rhys composed the music for the successful iOS and Android game Whale Trail which has been an iTunes game of the week.

=== Political music ===
In 2016 Rhys composed and sang "I Love EU" to support the Remain campaign in the UK European Membership Referendum.

== Film scores ==
In 2014, Rhys composed the film score for Set Fire to the Stars about Dylan Thomas and starring Celyn Jones and Elijah Wood. The jazz group he formed to record the music features drummer Chris Walmsley, double-bassist Jim Barr (Portishead), Gavin Fitzjohn on trumpet and pianist Osian Gwynedd (formerly of Big Leaves and Sybridion) on piano, with strings arranged by Gruff Ab Arwel (Y Niwl). Additional string music was recorded by the Elysian Quartet. In September 2015, Rhys won the 2015 BAFTA Cymru award for Original Music for the score.

== Opera ==
Rhys wrote the libretto for the 2017 opera 2117/Hedd Wyn, with music by the composer Stephen McNeff. The story is inspired by the life of the Welsh poet Hedd Wyn; set in the year 2117, it imagines a group of schoolchildren in a post-apocalyptic Trawsfynydd learning about the life and work of the poet. It was recorded by Ty Cerdd Records and released in 2022.

== Personal life ==
He supports Bangor City F.C. of the League of Wales.

He formed ieie Productions with his partner Catryn Ramasut in 2006 to produce film and television projects.

In July 2015, Rhys received an Honorary Fellowship from Bangor University. Among those also receiving the honour that day was Rhys's cousin, DJ and music promoter Huw Stephens. Their mutual grandfather was president of the Students' Union at the university. Rhys is also the cousin of musician MC Mabon (Gruff Meredith).

== Discography ==
=== Studio albums ===
List of studio albums, with relevant details
Title	Release details	Peak chart position		
Title	Release details	SCOT	UK	UK Indie
Yr Atal Genhedlaeth	Released: 25 January 2005; Label: Placid Casual	—	—	13
Candylion	Released: 8 January 2007; Label: Rough Trade	51	50	1
Hotel Shampoo	Released: 14 February 2011; Label: Ovni	54	42	6
American Interior	Released: 5 May 2014; Label: Turnstile	32	24	28
Babelsberg	Released: 8 June 2018; Label: Rough Trade	22	23	5
Pang!	Released: 13 September 2019; Label: Rough Trade	32	81	8
Seeking New Gods	Released: 21 May 2021; Label: Rough Trade	8	10	3
Sadness Sets Me Free	Released: 26 January 2024; Label: Rough Trade	7	22	5
Dim Probs	Released: 12 September 2025; Label: Rock Action	44	—	4
"—" denotes releases that did not chart.

=== Soundtrack albums ===
List of soundtrack albums, with relevant details
Title	Release details	Peak chart position		
Title	Release details	SCOT	UK Indie	UK Sound
Set Fire to the Stars	Released: 30 September 2016; Label: Twisted Nerve	—	—	17
The Almond & the Seahorse	Released: 24 February 2023; Label: Rough Trade	69	22	1
"—" denotes releases that did not chart.

=== Singles and extended plays ===
Year	Title	Label
2005	"Gwn Mi Wn" / "Ni Yw Y Byd"	Placid Casual
2006	"Candylion" b/w "Colossal Smile"	Rough Trade Records
2007	"Gyrru Gyrru Gyrru" b/w "Y Creadur"	Rough Trade Records
2010	"Shark Ridden Waters" b/w "I Totally Understand"	Ovni Records
2011	"Sensations in the Dark" b/w "Follow the Sunflower Trail (Theme Tune for a National Strike)"	Ovni Records
2011	"Honey All Over" b/w "Xenodocheionology"	Ovni Records
2011	"Space Dust #2" b/w "Whale Trail"	Ovni Records
2011	Atheist Xmas EP	Ovni Records
2016	"I Love EU"	Ovni Records/Turnstile Music
2018	"Bae Bae Bae"	Eisteddfod
2021	Loan Your Loneliness EP	Rough Trade Records
2022	"People Are Pissed" b/w "Arogldarth"	Rough Trade Records

=== Ffa Coffi Pawb ===
Year	Title	Label
1988	Dalec Peilon	Ankst
1991	Clymhalio	Ankst
1992	Hei Vidal!	Ankst
2004	Am Byth (Compilation)	Placid Casual

=== Super Furry Animals ===
Year	Title	Label
1996	Fuzzy Logic	Creation Records
1997	Radiator	Creation Records
1999	Guerrilla	Creation Records
2000	Mwng	Placid Casual
2001	Rings Around the World	Epic Records
2003	Phantom Power	Epic Records
2005	Love Kraft	Sony BMG
2007	Hey Venus!	Rough Trade Records
2009	Dark Days/Light Years	Rough Trade Records

=== Neon Neon ===
Year	Title	Label
2008	Stainless Style	Lex Records
2013	Praxis Makes Perfect	Lex Records

=== Tony da Gatorra vs Gruff Rhys ===
Year	Title	Label
2010	The Terror of Cosmic Loneliness	Turnstile

== Bibliography ==
- Gruff Rhys (2014) American Interior: The Quixotic Journey of John Evans, His Search for a Lost Tribe and How, Fuelled by Fantasy and (Possibly) Booze, He Accidentally Annexed a Third of North America (Hamish Hamilton, Penguin Books Ltd.) ISBN 9780241146019

== Filmography ==
- Beautiful Mistake (Welsh: Camgymeriad Gwych) (2000) - appearance with Super Furry Animals
- 9 Songs (2004) – appearance with Super Furry Animals
- Separado! (2010)
- American Interior (I Grombil Cyfandir Pell) (2014)
