= 9Bach =

Welsh alternative folk band

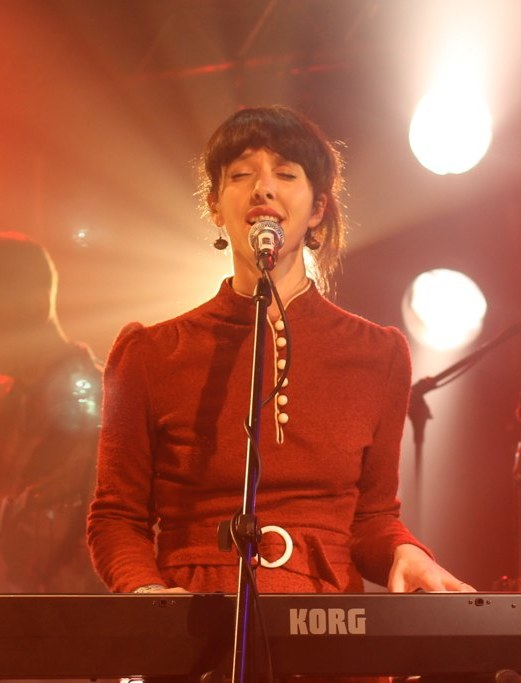
- Lisa Jen Brown performing with 9Bach at Gwyl Hanner Cant, a celebration of 50 years of Cymdeithas yr Iaith Gymraeg

Background information
- Origin: Bethesda, Wales
- Genres: Folk, world music, acid folk
- Years active: 2005–present
- Label: Real World Records
- Members: Lisa Jên; Martin Hoyland; Esyllt Glyn Jones; Mirain Roberts; Dan Swain; Andy Gangadeen
- Past members: Ali Byworth
- Website: www.9bach.com

9Bach is an alternative folk group formed by Welsh singer-songwriter and pianist Lisa Jên and guitarist Martin Hoyland, a veteran of 1990s alt-rock band Pusherman. The group now includes Dan Swain (bass guitar), Esyllt Glyn Jones (harp, vocals), Mirain Roberts (vocals) and Andy Gangadeen (drums). The sextet's name puns on "nain", the word for "grandmother" in north Wales; "bach" means "small" in Welsh.

When the group began in 2005, its repertoire mainly consisted of traditional Welsh-language folk songs. Its self-titled debut album was released in 2009. Lisa Jên sang on Gruff Rhys's 2007 album, Candylion, and toured with Rhys in that period.

In 2015, 9Bach's album Tincian ("resonate") won Best Album at the BBC Radio 2 Folk Awards. The band was joined onstage by Bethesda-based male voice choir Côr Penrhyn for their final song of the evening.

The band's third album, Anian, ("nature") was released 13 May 2016. A companion disc of spoken-word responses to the music includes performances by the actor Rhys Ifans and Real World founder Peter Gabriel. The album incorporates Greek and Middle Eastern musical influences.
