= Candylion =

Studio album by Gruff Rhys
- Released: 8 January 2007
- Recorded: Stiwsio Ofn, Llanfaelog, Wales, Spring 2006; AR 3, Rio De Janeiro; Dairy, Brixton, London
- Genre: Alternative rock
- Length: 44:39
- Labels: Rough Trade Records (UK), Team Love (US)
- Producers: Gruff Rhys, Gorwel Owen, Mario Caldato, Jr.

Gruff Rhys chronology
Yr Atal Genhedlaeth (2005)	Candylion (2007)	Hotel Shampoo (2011)

Singles from Candylion
- 1. "Candylion" b/w "Colossal Smile" Released: 4 December 2006; 2. "Gyrru Gyrru Gyrru" b/w "Y Creadur" Released: 2007 (iTunes only single)

Professional ratings
Aggregate scores
Source	Rating
Metacritic	80/100
Review scores
Source	Rating
The Guardian	4/5 stars
The Independent	2/5 stars
NME	7/10 stars
Pitchfork Media	8/10 stars
The Times	4/5 stars
Twisted Ear	4.5/5 stars
The Wheel's Still In Spin	(not rated)
Uncut	4/5 stars
AllMusic	4/5 stars

Candylion is the second solo album by Welsh musician and Super Furry Animals front-man Gruff Rhys. It was released on 8 January 2007 through Rough Trade Records (in the UK) and Team Love (in the US) and peaked at number fifty on the UK Albums Chart. The album includes the singles "Candylion" and "Gyrru Gyrru Gyrru".

It also features Lisa Jen from the Welsh language band 9Bach on backing vocals and xylophone. On its release, record stores stocking the album were supplied with 96 inch cardboard sheets with patterns for making the cardboard candylion seen on the album cover, to hand out to purchasers.

== Track listing ==
All music and beats by Gruff Rhys.

No.	Title	Length
1.	"This Is Just the Beginning"	0:50
2.	"Candylion"	2:31
3.	"The Court of King Arthur"	3:24
4.	"Lonsome Words"	2:55
5.	"Cycle of Violence"	2:56
6.	"Painting People Blue"	2:53
7.	"Beacon in the Darkness"	3:18
8.	"Con Cariño"	2:18
9.	"Gyrru Gyrru Gyrru" (Translation: "Driving Driving Driving")	3:17
10.	"Now That the Feeling Has Gone"	3:01
11.	"Ffrwydriad yn y Ffurfafen" (Translation: "Explosion in the Sky")	2:40
12.	"Skylon!"	14:36

== Personnel ==
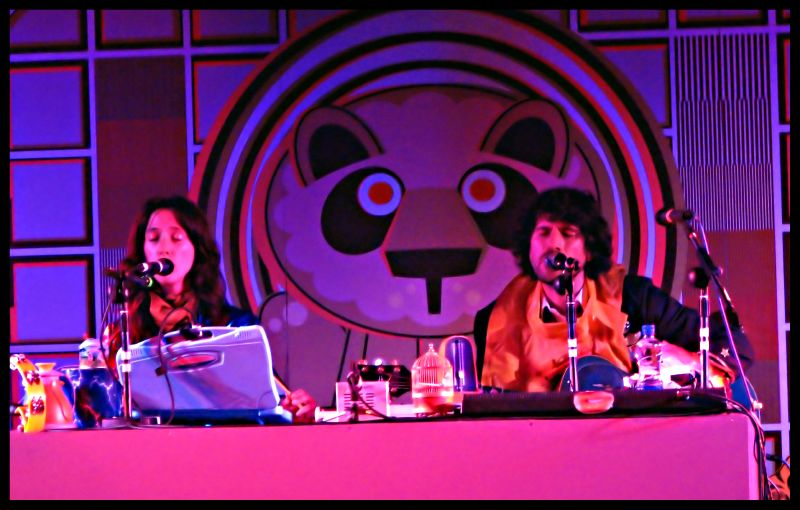
Gruff Rhys and Lisa Jen performing live at Custom House Square, Belfast, Northern Ireland, United Kingdom in 2007 in support of Candylion

Musician credits

- Gruff Rhys – Music and Beats
- Lisa Jên – Extra Vocals (2, 4, 6 to 8, 10, 12)
- Owen Evans – Double Bass (2 to 6, 10, 12)
- Kassin – Gameboy Beats (9)
- Gorwel Owen – Tamboura (7), Stylophone (12)
- Marçal – Extra Special Production (8, 9, 12)
- Tandi Gebara – Birambau (12)
- Felipe Pinaud – Flute (5, 11, 12)
- Jonathan Thomas – Pedal Steel (6)
- Rhodri Puw – Bell (4)
- Siwan Puw – Sleigh Bells (7)
- Samantha Caldato – Intro Vocal (1), Air Steward Vocal (12)

Technical credits

- Gruff Rhys, Gorwel Owen and Mario Caldato, Jr. – Producer
- Gorwel Owen – Recording (at Stiwsio Ofn, Llanfaelog, Wales)
- Mario Caldato, Jr. – Mixing and Extra Special Percussion Recording (at AR Studio 3, Rio de Janeiro, Brasil)
- Igor Ferreira and Cesar Miranda – Mixing Assistant (at AR Studio 3, Rio de Janeiro, Brasil)
- Stewart Hawkes – Mastering (at Metropolis, London)
- Sean O'Hagan and Marcus Haldaway – String Arrangements (at Dairy, Brixton, London)
- Marc Lane – Engineering (at Dairy, Brixton, London)
- Amanda Britton, Sally Herbert, Brian Wright, Jacqueline Norrie, Laura Melhuish – Violin
- Marcus Holdaway – Cello
- Pete Fowler – Artwork
- Pete James – Artwork, Art Direction and Photography

== Charts ==
Chart	Peak
UK Albums Chart	50
