= Hotel Shampoo =

Studio album by Gruff Rhys
- Released: 14 February 2011
- Recorded: Recorded for the most part at OFN, Llanfaelog, Wales 2010
- Genre: Alternative rock
- Length: 40:16
- Label: Ovni Records/Turnstile (UK), Wichita (US), Hostess Entertainment Unlimited (JP)
- Producer: Gorwel Owen, Gruff Rhys, Andy Votel

Gruff Rhys chronology
Candylion (2007)	Hotel Shampoo (2011)	American Interior (2014)

Singles from Hotel Shampoo
- 1. "Shark Ridden Waters" b/w "I Totally Understand" Released: October 2010; 2. "Sensations In The Dark" b/w "Follow The Sunflower Trail (Theme Tune For a National Strike)" Released: February 2011; 3. "Honey All Over" b/w "Xenodocheionology" Released: May 2011; 4. "Space Dust #2" b/w "Whale Trail" Released: October 2011

Professional ratings
Aggregate scores
Source	Rating
Metacritic	74/100
Review scores
Source	Rating
AllMusic	4.5/5 stars
Drowned In Sound	7/10 stars
The Independent	4/5 stars

Hotel Shampoo is the third solo album by Welsh musician and Super Furry Animals front-man Gruff Rhys. It was released on 14 February 2011 through Onvi Records/Turnstile (in the UK) and Wichita (in the US) and peaked at number forty-two on the UK Albums Chart. The album includes the singles "Shark Ridden Waters", "Sensations In The Dark", "Honey All Over" and "Space Dust #2"; the latter of which is collaboration with Sarah Assbring and Miles Kane. The album won the 2011 Welsh Music Prize and the Album of the Year award at the Artrocker Awards 2011.

The title of the record is a reference to Gruff’s habit of hoarding mini shampoo bottles and other complimentary hotel products whilst on tour, and the miniature hotel he built from them in advance of the record's announcement.

== Samples ==
The track "Shark Ridden Waters" is built around a sample of "It Doesn't Matter Anymore", as performed by The Cyrkle.

== Track listing ==
Floor 1
No.	Title	Length
1.	"Shark Ridden Waters"	4:25
2.	"Honey All Over"	3:18
3.	"Sensations in the Dark"	2:42
4.	"Vitamin K"	3:06
5.	"Take a Sentence"	3:05
6.	"Conservation Conversation"	2:40
7.	"Sophie Softly"	2:11

Floor 2
No.	Title	Length
8.	"Christopher Columbus"	3:33
9.	"Space Dust #2"	2:20
10.	"At the Heart of Love"	3:34
11.	"Patterns of Power"	3:37
12.	"If We Were Words (We Would Rhyme)"	3:13
13.	"Rubble Rubble"	2:53

International bonus tracks (Floor 3) 14. "I Totally Understand" – 3:40 (US, Japan and Taiwan) 15. "Follow the Sunflower Trail (Theme Tune for a National Strike)" – 4:12 (US and Japan) 16. "Pengwyn Pengwyn" – 1:34 (Taiwan)

== Personnel ==
Musician credits

- Gruff Rhys – Guitars, Vocals, Vibraphone, Moog, Korg and Solina Synthesizers
- Gorwel Owen – Piano, Moog, Banjo, Jupiter and Stylophone
- Owen Evans – Bass
- Chris Walmsley – Drums
- Sean O'Hagan – String Arrangements (4, 5, 9, 10)
- Marcus Holdaway – Cello (4, 5, 9, 10)
- Elspeth Cowey – Violin (4, 5, 9, 10)
- Morven Bryce – Violin (4, 5, 9, 10)
- Harriet Davies – Violin (4, 5, 9, 10)
- John Thomas – Pedal Steel (12)
- Andrew Kinsman – Saxophone (4, 11)
- Gary Alesbrook – Trumpet (5, 10, 11)
- El Perro del Mar (Sarah Assbring) – Vocals (9)
- Miles Kane – Guitar (9)
- Danny Frankel – Percussion (3)
- David Ralicke – Brass (3)

Technical credits

- Gruff Rhys and Gorwel Owen – Recording (at OFN, Llanfaelog, Wales)
- Craig Silvey – Recording (Drums)
- Mark Allway – Recording Assistant (Drums)
- Joe Watson – Recording (Strings) (at Press Play Studios, London)
- John Thomas – Recording (Brass) (at Buffalo Sound Recorder, Cardiff)
- David Wrench – Recording (Additional Piano) (at Bryn Derwen, Bethesda)
- Andy Votel – Recording (in Manchester) (1, 8)
- Gaz Sironical – Recording Assistant (in Manchester) (1, 8)
- Mario Caldato, Jr. – Mixing, Additional Overdubs (at MCJ, Los Angeles)
- Bernie Grundman – Mastering (at Bernie Grundman Mastering, Los Angeles)
- Pete Fowler – Artwork
- Mark James – Photography

== Charts ==
Chart	Peak
UK Albums Chart	42
