= Lisa Jên =

Welsh actress and singer

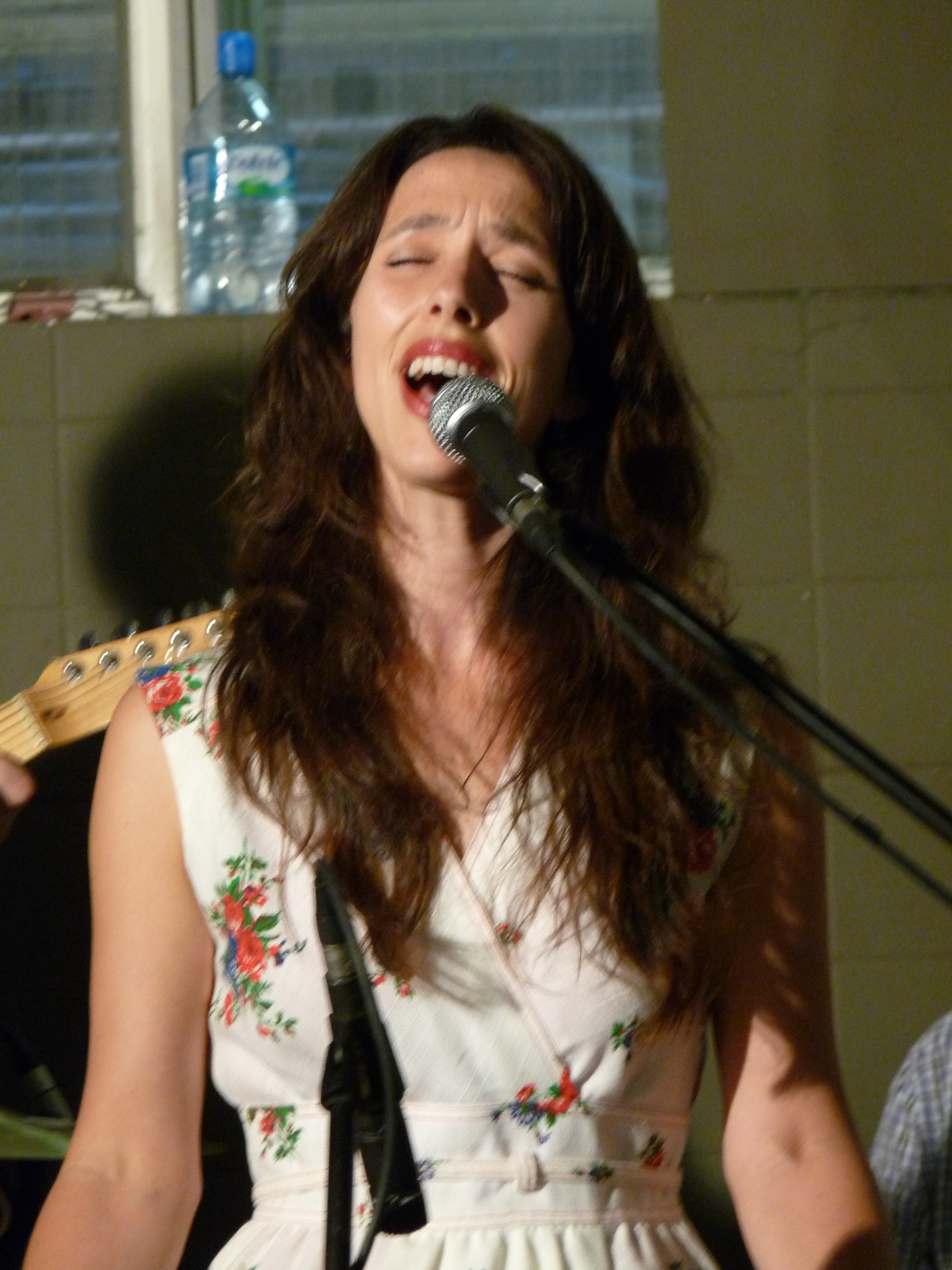
Lisa Jên in 2009

Lisa Jên Brown is a Welsh actress and singer with the Welsh language folk band 9Bach. She is originally from Bethesda, Gwynedd, north Wales and is the daughter of Welsh actress Linda Brown. She attended drama school at Ysgol Glanaethwy, beginning her acting career at 14 years old; she landed her first acting break on the Welsh TV drama Rownd a Rownd on S4C. Brown met her husband, Martin Hoyland, the guitarist for 9Bach, in London. They have two children.

== Career ==
In 2015, Brown's band 9 Bach won the best album award at the BBC Radio 2 Folk Awards. Their album Anian was nominated for the Welsh Language Album of the Year award in 2016. She also has a career in acting, appearing in numerous Welsh drama series, such as Gwaith/Cartref, Cara Fi, Emyn Roc a Rol and Rownd a Rownd.

== Personal life ==
Brown is a supporter of Welsh independence. "The right to govern ourselves in an independent Wales would give us a solid vessel to navigate our future with empathy, knowledge and strength," she said. "We are a country with different attitudes and perspective, tradition and culture – but we've been colonised, forced to always be second class citizens in our own country. Having independence means many things… but what excites me is the value and status our indigenous language will have – as a nation we'd be much more confident speaking our words."
