= Copilot (film) =

2021 German-French drama film

- Directed by: Anne Zohra Berrached
- Screenplay by: Stefanie Misrahi, Anne Zohra Berrached
- Starring: Canan Kir; Roger Azar; Özay Fecht; Jana Julia Roth; Ceci Chuh; Nicolas Chaoui
- Cinematography: Christopher Aoun
- Edited by: Denys Darahan
- Music by: Evgueni Galperine, Sacha Galperine
- Release date: 2021
- Running time: 118 minutes
- Countries: Germany; France

Copilot (German: Die Welt wird eine andere sein) is a 2021 German-French drama film directed by Anne Zohra Berrached. The relationship drama centers on a German-Turkish student (played by Canan Kir) who falls in love with a Lebanese fellow student (Roger Azar) and marries him despite objections from her family. Told from the subjective perspective of the female protagonist, the film follows the couple over five years in five chapters. The man's increasingly intense Islamist radicalization puts their marriage under severe strain and ultimately leads to a catastrophe of global proportions. Director Berrached worked very intuitively and allowed extensive improvisation in order to achieve the greatest possible authenticity from her actors.

The fictional film is loosely based on the biography of terrorist Ziad Jarrah, without referring to him directly. Jarrah was a pilot involved in the September 11 attacks in the United States. In the year of its release, Copilot was selected for the program of the 71st Berlin International Film Festival. It was released theatrically in Germany on 12 August 2021.

== Production ==
=== Screenplay development ===
For Anne Zohra Berrached, Copilot (previous working titles: Geliebt and Die Frau des Piloten) was her third feature film as director. As the daughter of an Algerian father who grew up in the GDR between a Western lifestyle and Muslim culture, she identified with the two main characters. Asli and Saeed would both feel like outsiders while simultaneously feeling at home in Germany. Berrached also understood her film as "a story about the contradictions faced by migrants from the Islamic cultural sphere, how they deal with them and how their feelings are expressed". It was important to her to portray the diversity of Muslims in Germany. At the same time, Berrached struggled with Asli's passivity. She did not want to portray the character as ignorant or naive under any circumstances. "For me, it is a film about a woman who realizes too late that she could have acted in a more emancipated way," Berrached said. "Whether Asli represses things or acts unconsciously, I leave open in my film."

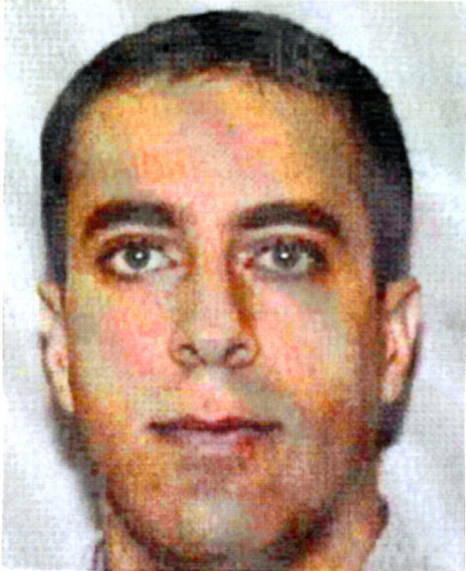
Ziad Jarrah's driver's license photograph (2001)

Berrached wrote the screenplay together with Stefanie Misrahi, with parallels to Ziad Jarrah being recognizable, although the film does not refer to him directly. The Lebanese terrorist, who had studied in Germany, was a pilot involved in the September 11 attacks in the United States. He was aboard United Airlines Flight 93, which crashed in Pennsylvania following a passenger revolt. Berrached and Misrahi observed that families and relationships were increasingly being driven apart by ideology. They therefore wanted to bring a love story "full of political polarization" to the screen. "We portray the time before the big bang of political polarization, the late 1990s. An amour fou against the backdrop of a terrible historical event that, through its violence and symbolic power, has left a lasting emptiness and sense of mystery in all of us," Berrached said. They focused on the female lead. Before production, Berrached conducted extensive research with film producers Roman Paul and Gerhard Meixner into terrorists and their wives. The information they collected served the writers as source material for the screenplay. Berrached emphasized that the film was not merely a "retelling of a historical sequence". Some entire scenes in the screenplay were rewritten in sequence and dialogue during rehearsals with the cast.

=== Casting ===
In her previous films, Berrached had cast non-professional actors in supporting roles. While writing the screenplay, she developed the desire to cast both the leading and supporting roles with talented but relatively unknown actors in order to achieve authentic performances. Together with casting director Susanne Ritter, the filmmaker organized a casting process lasting almost a year, involving more than 500 emerging actors, most of whom she asked to improvise. During this process she discovered the relatively unknown German-Turkish theater actress Canan Kir, whom she cast as Asli because of her authentic performance and expressive eyes. Kir speaks Turkish fluently in addition to German.

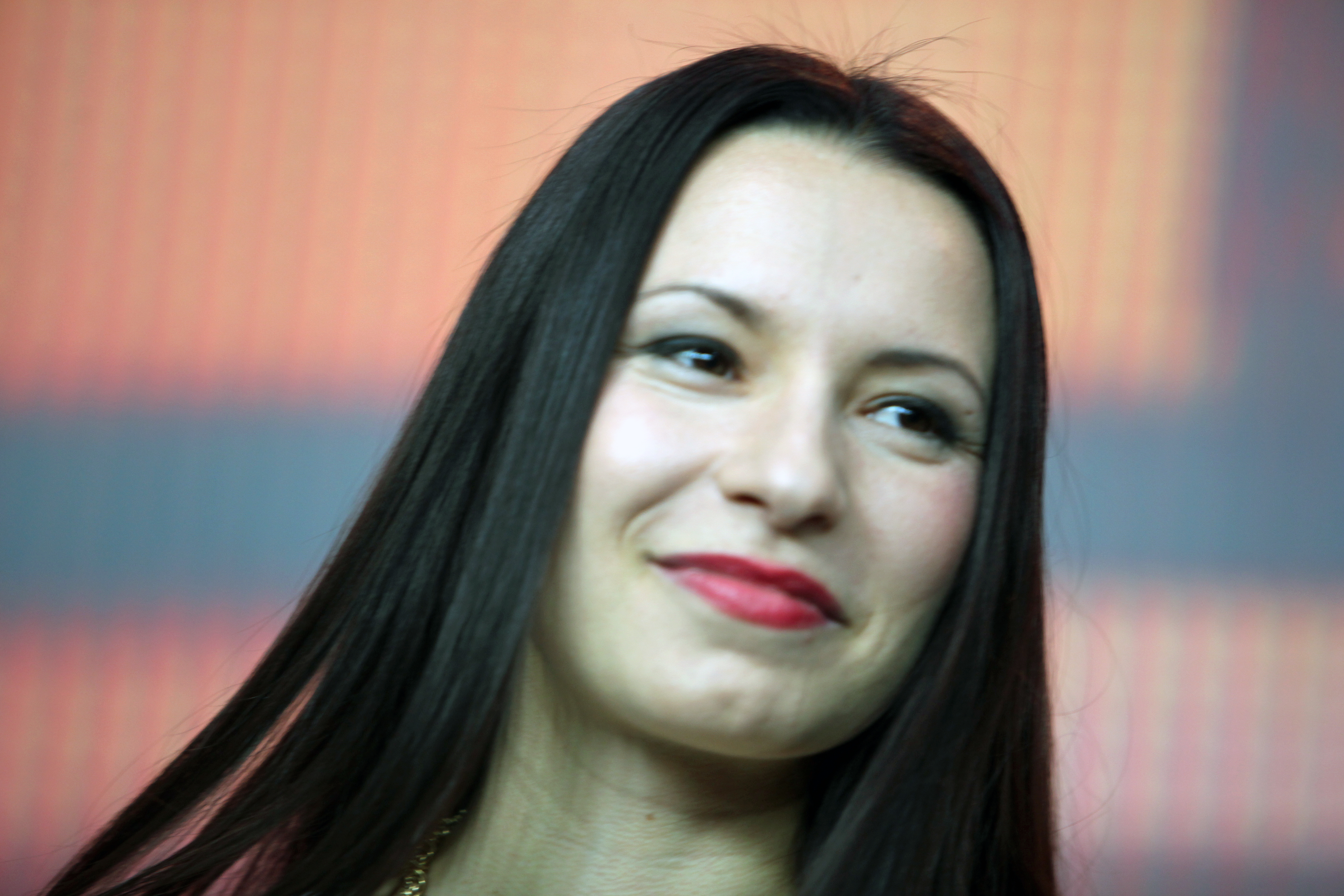
Director Anne Zohra Berrached (2016)

Casting Saeed proved difficult. Berrached did not consider any actor of Lebanese descent living in Germany authentic enough for the role. As a result, a three-week casting process was organized in Beirut in English and French together with producer Paul, co-writer Misrahi and casting director Abla Khoury. 120 people took part. Roger Azar was the penultimate candidate and had learned about the casting only by chance. Berrached was impressed by his sensitive and proud portrayal of Saeed and later described him as an "improvisation artist". In preparation for filming, Azar was provided with an apartment in Berlin and attended German classes at the Goethe-Institut six days a week for almost a year in order to learn the language. The film crew gave Azar particular support during the winter months. "Unconsciously, I went to Berlin to experience what Saeed experienced, to take the same path: moving to another country, learning a new language, forming a new identity," Azar said. He researched the real terrorist Ziad Jarrah extensively, noting that, like him, Jarrah came from a wealthy family and lived nearby with his family. Azar avoided contacting Jarrah's family so as not to reopen old wounds. He also preferred to approach his character from within.

A year before filming began, Berrached started rehearsing with her two leads. She invited Kir and Azar to her home and initially had them improvise as a couple and build trust with one another. In a second stage, she had them improvise situations from the screenplay. She filmed and evaluated the rehearsals together with co-writer Misrahi and editor Denys Darahan, which also resulted in changes to the script. After around six months of purely improvisational work, she gave Kir and Azar the screenplay for the first time. The two leads spent a week analyzing the script in joint sessions with the writers and an acting coach. Berrached wanted to eliminate questions and uncertainties as far as possible before filming. Rehearsals stopped one month before filming. She also kept blocking rehearsals as short as possible.

=== Filming ===
Filming took place over five months from August 2018 to January 2019 in Germany (Berlin, Leipzig, Hamburg, Bochum, Greifswald), Lebanon (Beirut), and the United States (Florida). The production was considered demanding by the film crew. During filming, Berrached and her team in cinematography, production design, costume and makeup sought to put the actors first so that they could feel comfortable and give authentic performances. Cinematographer Christopher Aoun and production designer Janina Schimmelbauer, for example, designed locations and lighting so that the actors could move freely through 360 degrees. The aim was to give them the feeling of being in "real places" rather than on a film set with intrusive set dressing and long intervals between scene changes. Furniture and locations were also made their own by the actors—Kir and Azar spent time in the apartments of their respective characters before filming. Berrached called for spontaneous scene performances during filming and sometimes withheld information from individual actors to encourage spontaneity. She later praised Kir and Azar for their "masterful dedication". The film could not be shot in chronological order, which created considerable additional work for the costume and makeup departments because the two protagonists change physically over the five-year course of their relationship.

=== Cinematography and production design ===
Unlike in her earlier films, Berrached wanted to control the visual appearance of Copilot while still making it seem "unconstructed". She therefore used handheld cinematography and worked closely with Lebanese cinematographer Christopher Aoun, production designer Janina Schimmelbauer and costume designer Melina Scappatura. Together with her creative team, she developed a palette of colors and shapes for the costumes, production design and lighting. This was strictly adhered to and also reinforced the characters' moods. At the beginning of the film, when the couple's love is still carefree, Berrached opted for pastel tones. She ended the film with darker, saturated colors and unsettled visual patterns. She refused to make the production design and costumes conform in detail to the 1990s, as she did not want to make a historical film but a timeless one. Costume designer Scappatura therefore created a subtle 1990s look. Attention was also paid to the material qualities of the locations. The aging of Saeed and Asli was conveyed not only through makeup and costumes but also through the production design.

Christopher Aoun, who had previously worked on the internationally award-winning films Capernaum and The Man Who Sold His Skin, employed intimate, realistic cinematography and avoided the use of long takes. He nevertheless incorporated poetic elements to break with the realism. "To give images to Asli's feelings and inner conflicts, we leave the style of the film and dream together with the protagonist," Aoun said. The film team relied on natural light. Aoun shot with a Sony Venice camera using 1.3× anamorphic Vantage lenses. This was intended to give the film a "poetic distance from reality" without being intrusive or distracting from the characters. The particularly sharp images produced by the camera were digitally processed by Dirk Meier. The aim was to achieve image quality with familiar sharpness while retaining an analog appearance.

=== Post-production ===
Post-production on Copilot was complicated and lengthy. Problems arose from the many filming locations and the different languages during the editing phase. Berrached's improvisational approach resulted in a very large amount of footage. The five-year period covered by the story also presented difficulties for editor Denys Darahan.

With an estimated budget of six million euros, the film was the largest production Berrached had directed. Copilot was produced by German company Razor Film in co-production with Haut et Court, zero one film, NDR and Arte. The project was supported by the German Federal Film Fund (DFFF), the German Federal Film Board (FFA), the Federal Government Commissioner for Culture and the Media (BKM), Eurimages, the Mitteldeutsche Medienförderung (MDM), Medienboard Berlin-Brandenburg (MBB), Film- und Medienstiftung NRW, Filmförderung Hamburg Schleswig-Holstein (FFHSH), and the French CNC & MEDIA. In Germany, distribution was handled by Neue Visionen. Worldwide distribution was handled by The Match Factory.

== Reception ==
Due to the COVID-19 pandemic, the preview of Copilot took place in March 2021 at the "Industry Event" of the Berlin International Film Festival, where the film was selected for the Panorama section. The regular premiere took place on 13 June 2021 at Freiluftkino Friedrichshain as part of the Berlinale audience festival ("Summer Special").

Lena Bopp (Frankfurter Allgemeine Zeitung) saw a major discrepancy between the latent terror and the images created by cinematographer Christopher Aoun. She argued that the film's tension and urgency emerged from this contrast. However, she noted that the film could be interpreted as "glorifying a terrorist" or as conveying the message, "See, this is what Muslims are like, they seem completely harmless, and then they strike!"

Cornelia Geissler (Berliner Zeitung) likewise noted the film's social and political relevance and praised the impressive performance of lead actress Canan Kir. Director Berrached gathered "many experiences of an alienation that cannot be overcome because the protagonists are so little able to approach one another". Because of their different faiths and value systems, the relationship between Asli and Saeed was "toxic". Copilot sharpened "the view of recognizing the social within private circumstances".

Both Geissler and Tim Caspar Boehme (die tageszeitung) suggested that it was best for viewers to know as little as possible about the plot before watching the film. According to Boehme, the film's strength was that it was told entirely from the perspective of the female protagonist, who only gradually recognizes her boyfriend's radicalization.

Martin Schwickert (General-Anzeiger) said he would have liked to see the film in competition for the Golden Bear rather than in the secondary Panorama section. Berrached told the story "uncompromisingly from the woman's perspective" and combined "an intimate relationship drama with a contemporary historical trauma".

Nadine Lange (Der Tagesspiegel) was less positive in her brief review. She found the behavior of the self-confident Asli, who "asks and questions little" about her husband's transformation, "implausible in the long run".

== Accolades ==
The film received the main prize of the Feature Film Competition and the Popular Jury prize at the Italian Lucca Film Festival and Europa Cinema. It was nominated for the Panorama Audience Award at the 2021 Berlin International Film Festival. In addition, Copilot was included in the preliminary selection for the 2021 German Film Award.
