= Christopher Aoun =

Lebanese-German cinematographer

- Born: December 15, 1989 (age 36); Beirut, Lebanon
- Citizenship: Germany
- Occupation: Cinematographer
- Website: christopheraoun.com

Christopher Aoun (born 15 December 1989) is a Lebanese-German cinematographer, best known for his work in CAPERNAUM, a Cannes Grand Prix du Jury winner and Oscar nominee film, The Man Who Sold His Skin, and Copilot. Aoun is also a member of the Academy of Motion Picture Arts and Science.

== Early life and education ==
Aoun was born on 15 December 1989 in Beirut. He later studied cinematography at the Université Saint-Joseph de Beyrouth and the University of Television and Film Munich.

== Career ==
Prior to shooting 'Capernaum,' he worked on Philippe Aractingi's film 'Listen' in Lebanon, the documentary 'Kalveli - Shadows of the Desert' in India, and several other advertisements and music videos globally. He gained public recognition for his work in Nadine Labaki's Academy Award-nominated film 'Capernaum,' which also received the Jury Prize at the 2018 Cannes Film Festival.

Aoun won the German Cinematography Award in 2019 and was selected by Variety as one of the "10 Cinematographers to Watch," as well as a "Rising Star of Cinematography" by American Cinematographer magazine. He also became a member of the Academy of Motion Picture Arts and Sciences in the same year.

Aoun also garnered attention in 2021 for his work in Copilot, directed by Anne Zohra Berrached, which was premiered at the Berlinale Film Festival, and Kaouther Ben Hania's 'The Man who Sold his Skin', starring Monica Bellucci, which was nominated for the Academy Awards.

== Filmography ==
S.No.	Title	Type	Year	Role
1	Die Stille wird lauter	Short Film	2011	Cinematographer
2	Martha & Karl	Short Film	2012	Cinematographer (Director of Photography)
3	Supervision	Documentary (Short)	2012	Cinematographer
4	Rastlos	Short Film	2012	Cinematographer
5	Gegen Die Zeit - Das Portrait eines Freundes	Documentary (Short)	2012	Director, Cinematographer
6	Zuflucht - Refuge	Short Film	2012	Cinematographer
7	After Gaza	Documentary (Short)	2014	Producer, Cinematographer
8	Expire	Short Film	2015	Camera Operator
9	In White	Short Film	2016	Cinematographer
10	Gis	Short Film	2016	Cinematographer
11	Listen	Film	2017	Cinematographer
12	Kalveli: Shadows of the Desert	Documentary	2018	Cinematographer
13	Capernaum	Film	2018	Cinematographer (Director of Photography)
14	Rina Sawayama: STFU!	Short Video	2019	Cinematographer
15	Selena Gomez: Boyfriend	Short Video	2020	Cinematographer
16	The Man Who Sold His Skin	Film	2020	Cinematographer
17	Copilot	Film	2021	Cinematographer
18	Loved	-	2021	Cinematographer
19	All That's Left Of You	Film	2025	Cinematographer

== Awards and recognition ==
- 2017- The Lebanese Movie Award for Ismail
- 2017- Milano International Film Festival Award and Best International Short Film
- 2019- German Camera Award for Capharnaüm
- 2019- The Lebanese Movie Award, Best Cinematography In A Lebanese Motion Picture for Capharnaüm
- 2021- German Camera Award for The Man Who Sold His Skin

== Personal life ==
Aoun is fluent in French, Arabic, German, and English.
