= Some Best Friend You Turned Out to Be =

Studio album by Max Tundra
- Released: 25 April 2000
- Studios: The Electric Smile, London
- Genres: IDM, indie electronic, experimental
- Length: 44:32
- Label: Domino
- Producer: Ben Jacobs

Max Tundra chronology
Some Best Friend You Turned Out to Be (2000)	Mastered by Guy at the Exchange (2002)

Singles from Some Best Friend You Turned Out to Be
- 1. "Cakes" Released: 27 March 2000; 2. "Ink Me" Released: 7 August 2000

Some Best Friend You Turned Out to Be is the debut studio album by Max Tundra, the alias of English producer Ben Jacobs. After releasing his debut single "Children at Play" through Warp Records in 1998, Tundra signed with Domino Records who released the album on 25 April 2000. The tracks "Cakes" and "Ink Me" were issued as singles.

In 2008, the entire album was reworked by several of Max Tundra's musician friends as Best Friends, which was released as a companion to Tundra's third album Parallax Error Beheads You. The record was re-released in 2022.

== Production ==
Jacobs recorded Some Best Friend You Turned Out to Be in an upstairs flat on Streatham Hill, London, where he was living at the time. The album's experimental sound was conceived as a reaction to "all the insipid, samey rubbish that was flooding the shelves at the time of writing", noting that he has "always been far more inspired by stuff I can't stand than music I love." He set out to make an album which invented eleven new types of music. The tracks on the album are all instrumental in nature, with Jacobs playing a wide range of instruments both traditional and electronic, which are then manipulated in unorthodox ways and sequenced using Jacobs' Amiga 500.

== Songs ==
The opening track "Cakes" was chosen as the album's lead single, and was stylistically an attempt at recreating the Mercury Rev album See You on the Other Side, though the song's chords were inspired by "Make Your Stash" by Daddy Cool, and makes prominent use of glitch to imitate a CD skipping. The track also features a trumpet that Jacobs bought for £15 off Loot magazine. "Lamplite on a One Horse Shoe" was created entirely on a rented Nord Lead 2 synthesizer, which Jacobs was inspired to use after reading Autechre used one to record their Cichlisuite EP. The title of "Ah, There's Deek – Let's Ask Him" was inspired by the author Irvine Welsh, "Deek" being the Scottish translation for "Derek". The track's instrumentation consists of a den-den daiko, a guitar pitched down to sound like a bass, and multi-tracked recorders.

"Lausanne" is built around a loop of cellphone interference, and features a steel drum Jacobs rented from Beat About The Bush, a film and television prop hire company. The track's title is derived from a word Jacobs found on the screen of a shortwave radio. "Tuli, A Plain Ride From Canvas" pays tribute to Tuli Kupferberg from The Fugs, and was recorded on an old cassette tape Jacobs had found in the street. It was edited from an hour's worth of improvised piano. The title of "Bill Sholem Quintette" is a homage to the Raymond Scott Quintet, and was named after an eccentric teacher at Jacobs' old synagogue. The track was created by Jacobs cycling through five demo songs on a toy keyboard, which is briefly interrupted by a field recording of a street sweeper, before going "all-out Fred Frith" with a Rhodes piano.

"Ink Me" was chosen as the album's second single, and the first to be accompanied by a music video, depicting Jacobs playing the record to his "bemused" fictional grandparents. "The Balaton" is a "total acid rave" number named after a village in Hungary. Parts of the track "Subsi Kuku" were repurposed by Jacobs for his cover of "Coming Up" by Paul McCartney in 2003. "6161" refers to the call-sign that Jacobs went under during his early job as car courier, which he would later go onto discuss on the songs "Lights" from the follow-up album Mastered by Guy at the Exchange. Jacobs would record a more stripped-back, harmonium-based arrangement of the track entitled "61over" for his next album. The album concludes with "Carbon Cones", which is also the album's longest track at a total of 12 minutes. The track originated on a three-track demo tape Jacobs sent to Domino, which resulting in his signing to the label.

== Release and reception ==
Professional ratings
Review scores
Source	Rating
AllMusic	4/5 stars
Pitchfork	9.2/10

Some Best Friend You Turned Out to Be was well received by critics upon release. Pitchfork writer Matt LeMay was particularly favourable, awarding the album 9.2/10, which resulted in the website becoming Jacobs' "sole reliable champion" over the course of his career. LeMay remarked that the album was

At times explosive, at times meditative, and always putting to use an eclectic series of acoustic and synthetic instruments. Due to its at times overwhelming nature, it would be natural to put something here to the effect of "this record is not for everyone." But to say that would be ridiculous-- this is the kind of dynamic, creative record that should be heard by as many people as possible. Though it occasionally resembles electronic minimalism, Some Best Friend You Turned Out to Be is the first of its kind: a true maximalist record.

AllMusic's Mark Richardson gave the album four out of five stars, stating the album

...manages to cram in about ten albums worth of musical ideas into its 45-minute running time. The staggering variety of the music here is a wonder to behold, from minimalist repetition of single sounds to epic blasts of symphonic pop, and Max Tundra (Londoner Ben Jacobs) reveals himself as a formidable talent." He concluded that "If you are into instrumental music with variety and can endure the occasional harsh passage, Some Best Friend You Turned Out to Be will hold up well under several hundred listens.

Reflecting on the album in 2022, Fergal Kinney of The Quietus summed the album up as "45 minutes where idea piles upon idea, an attention deficit obsession with multiplying sonic spectacle. Whenever the album feels solid, you’re stood on a trapdoor. It dispenses great ideas like confetti – take 'Lausanne’s thrilling games with audio static (a few years before Ghost Box hauntologists were patting themselves on the back for much the same) or the terrific jammed CD-J sound on 'Cakes'".

== Track listing ==
All tracks are written by Ben Jacobs.

No.	Title	Length
1.	"Cakes"	3:28
2.	"Lamplite on a One Horse Shoe"	1:58
3.	"Ah, There's Deek – Let's Ask Him"	2:01
4.	"Lausanne"	3:52
5.	"Tuli, A Plain Ride from Canvas"	2:02
6.	"Bill Sholem Quintette"	4:25
7.	"Ink Me"	2:50
8.	"The Balaton"	4:20
9.	"Subsi Kuku"	5:07
10.	"6161"	2:14
11.	"Carbon Cones"	12:12
