= The House Is Burning =

The House Is Burning may refer to:

- The House Is Burning (film), 2006 drama film directed by Holger Ernst
- The House Is Burning (album), 2021 studio album by rapper Isaiah Rashad
