= Battlefield illumination =

Technology for illuminating a battlefield

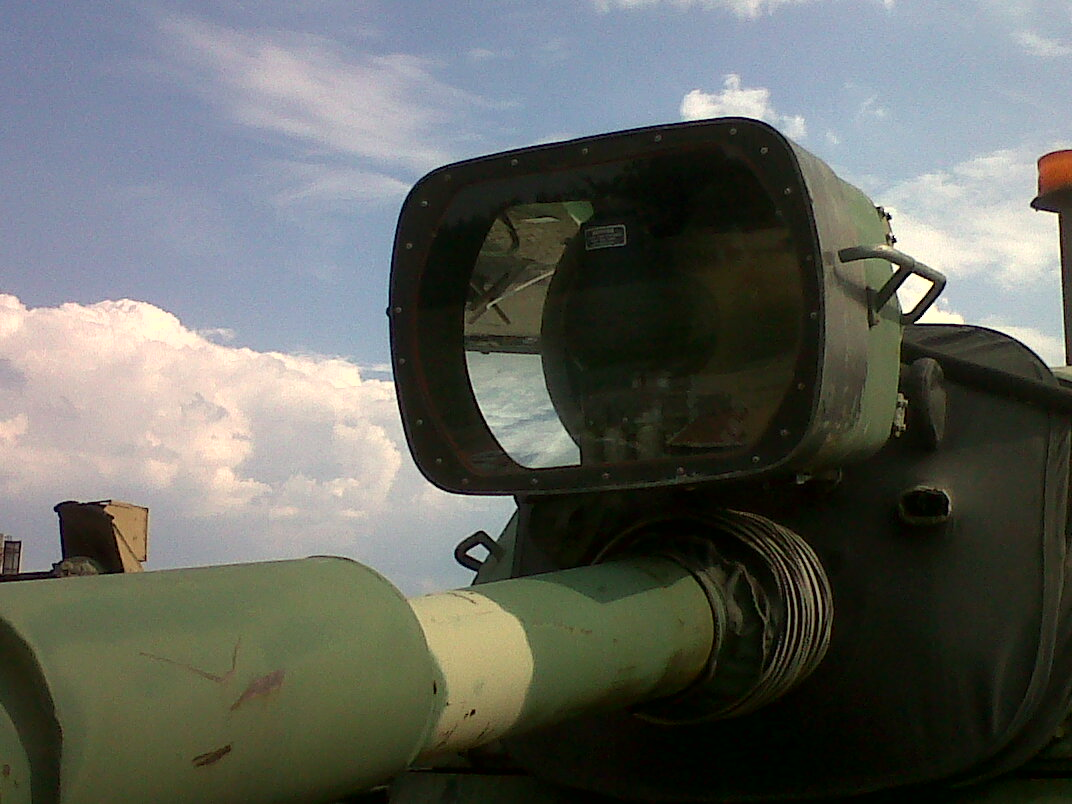
Infrared searchlight of an M60 Patton tank

Battlefield illumination is technology that improves visibility for military forces operating in difficult low-light conditions. The risks and dangers to armies fighting in poor light have been known since Ancient Chinese times. Prior to the advent of the electrical age, fire was used to improve visibility on the battlefield.

Modern armies use a variety of equipment and discharge devices to create artificial light. If natural light is not present searchlights, whether using visible light or infrared, and flares can be used. As light can be detected electronically, modern warfare has accordingly seen increased use of night vision through the use of infrared cameras and image intensifiers.

== Theory ==
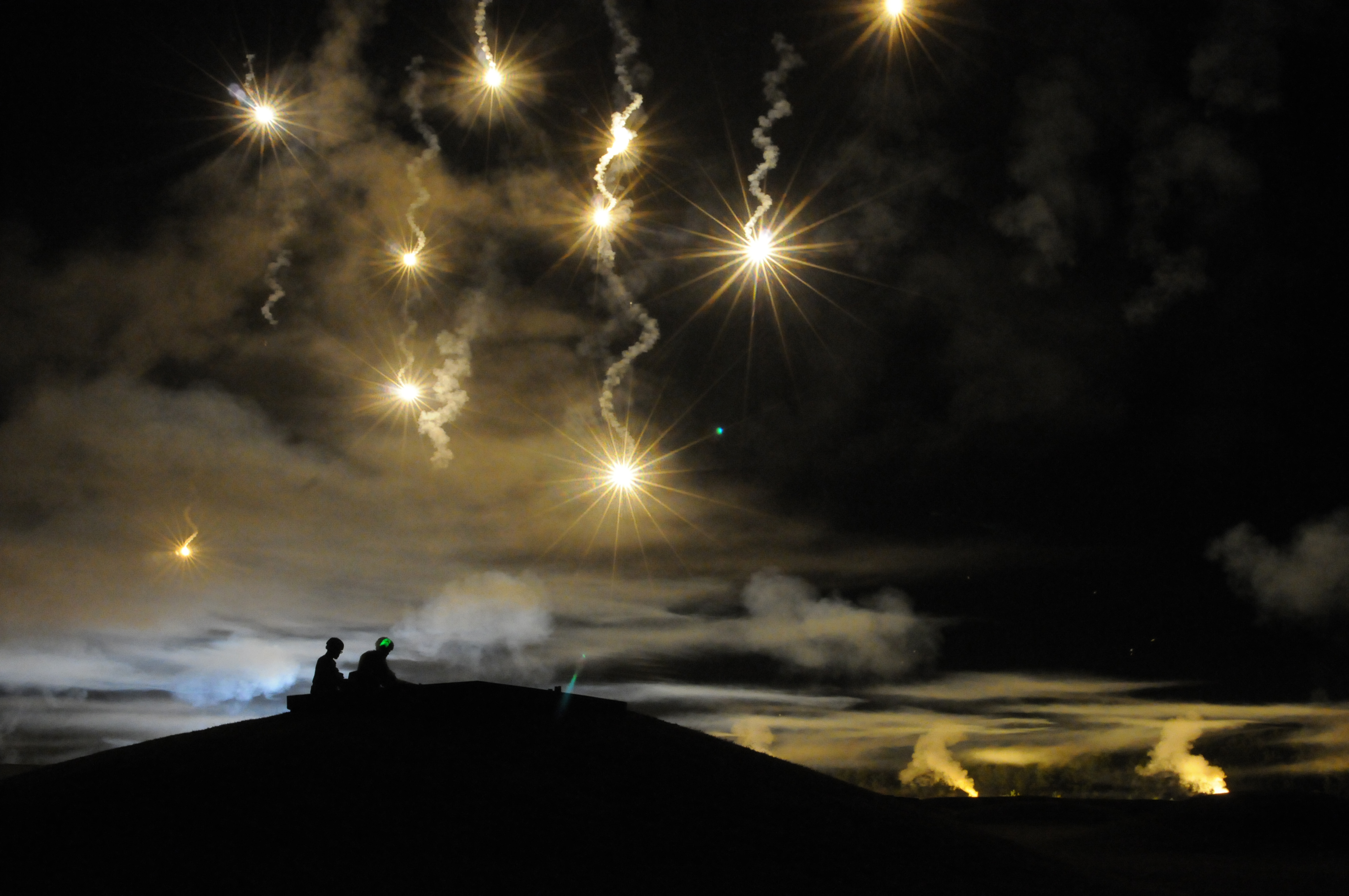
Flares in an exercise

Ancient military strategists knew that natural light created shadows that can hide form while bright areas would expose a military force's size and number. Ancient armies would always prefer to fight with the sun behind them in order to use the visual glare to partially blind an opposing enemy. Backlight would also obscure movement and numbers making it more difficult for an enemy to react quickly to any tactical assault.

Adverse weather such as fog, rain and snow reduce both visibility and the usefulness of illumination. Enemy action in the form of smoke and shellfire, and the dust and smoke created by battle generally, further limit the effectiveness of illumination. Thermal imaging devices (using infrared) can however to some extent penetrate these obstacles.

== History ==
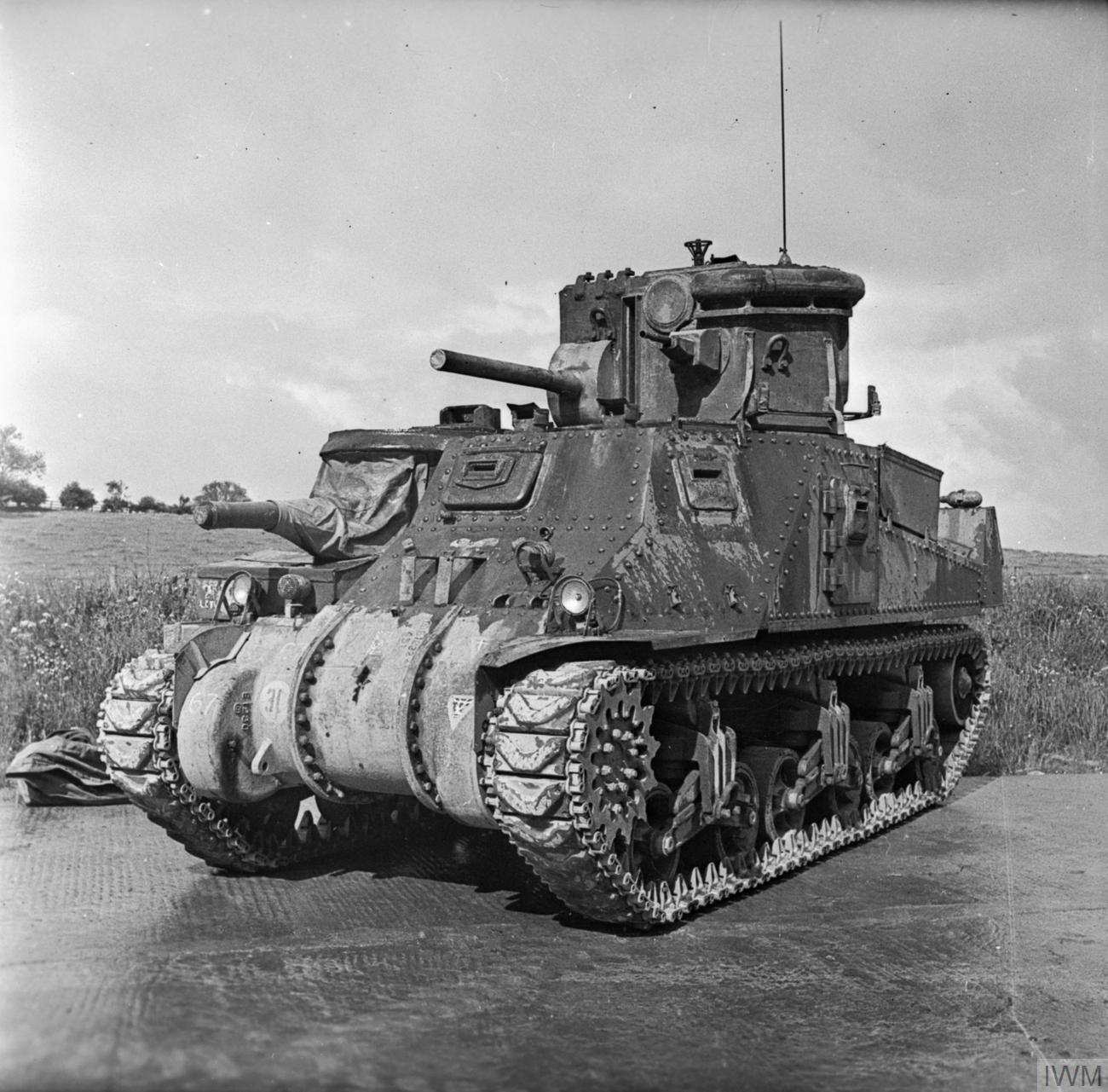
A M3 Grant tank modified with a carbon arc searchlight and dummy turret gun, codenamed Canal Defence Light

In 1583, during the Ottoman–Safavid War (1578–90), the Ottoman Empire used lanterns to defeat a Safavid army in a night time encounter, that became known as the Battle of Torches.

In 1882 the British Royal Navy used searchlights to prevent Egyptian forces from staffing artillery batteries at Alexandria during the Anglo-Egyptian War. Later that same year, the French and British forces landed troops under artificial light created by searchlights.

The Canal Defence Light was a British "secret weapon" of the Second World War. It was a tank fitted with a powerful carbon-arc searchlight to support night-time attacks. The War Office ordered 300 such lamps in 1940. During the latter stages of the war, the British Army created Moonlight Batteries that specialised in providing 'artificial moonlight', otherwise known as 'movement light' or 'Monty's moonlight' for ground operations.

Target indicator flares were widely used by the Royal Air Force during the Second World War; these were dropped by a wave of Pathfinder Force aircraft ahead of the main force of bombers to indicate the aiming point.

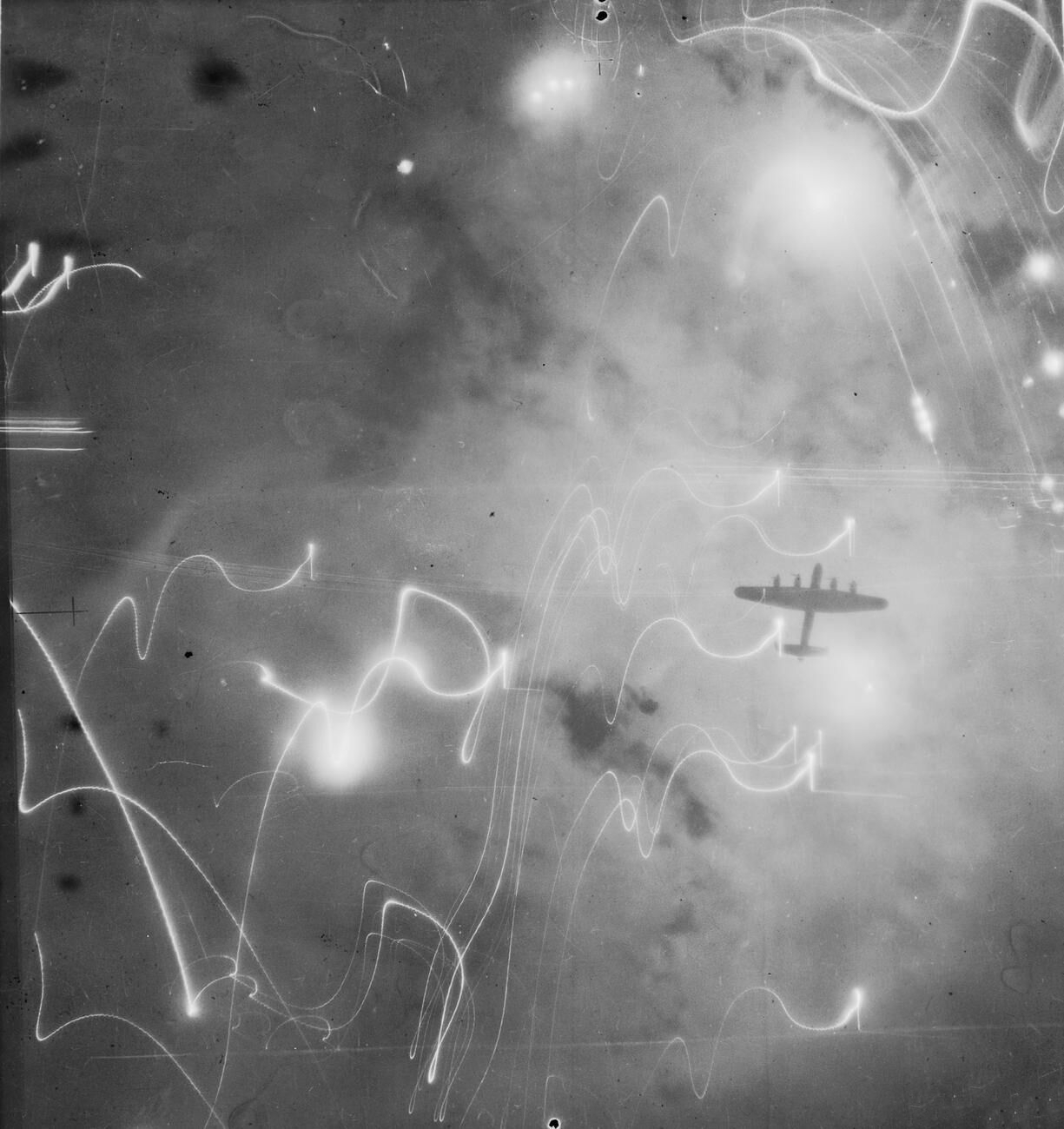
An RAF Avro Lancaster silhouetted against flares, smoke and explosions during the night attack on Hamburg on 30/31 January 1943

A sectional of the typical LUU-2B ground illumination flare

== Types ==
=== Flares ===
Flares can be used to mark positions, usually for targeting, but laser-guided and GPS weapons have reduced this function. GPS-guided bombs, for example, rely only on GPS signals, without any locally-provided target designation. Laser-guided bombs require a laser designator to guide them to the target, in turn requiring an observer (in the aircraft or on the ground) able to see the target and aim the laser designator.

During the Korean War and the Vietnam War, US ground forces used the M127A1 White Star Signal Flare Parachute to illuminate the jungle in forward positions.

A modern LUU-2B flare at 1,000 feet altitude illuminates the ground at 5 lux in a radius of 1500 feet. Burn time is 4–5 minutes. The flare is 36 inches long, 4.9 inches in diameter, and weighs about 30 pounds. A similar design called LUU-19B can provide covert illumination in the near-infrared (IR) spectrum with virtually no visual signature.

=== Searchlights ===
These are usually large portable devices that combine an extremely luminous source (usually a carbon arc lamp) with a mirrored parabolic reflector to project a powerful beam of light of approximately parallel rays in a particular direction. They have been used to create "artificial moonlight" on battlefields.

== Battlefield Illumination Airborne System (BIAS) ==
The Battlefield Illumination Airborne System (BIAS) was an illumination system consisting of a lamp assembly (consisting of a number of Xenon lamps), a power source, a heat exchanger pod and a control console. The system was intended to be installed on modified cargo aircraft, with the lamp assembly positioned on the rear cargo ramp, the other elements were to be installed in the main cargo area and mounted on the aircraft fuselage.

The United States Air Force (USAF) opened Operation Shed Light as a development effort on 7 February 1966. Shed Light explored the deficiencies in attacking targets at night, particularly with visible light illumination. A single BIAS system was developed by LTV electro-Systems and installed on a Fairchild C-123B for the Special Air Warfare Center at Eglin Air Force Base in Florida by April 1966. Initially designated Airborne General Illumination Light (AGIL), the system weighed 7,500 lb (3,400 kg) and had a lamp assembly with 28 Xenon lamps, heat exchanger and cooling system to prevent the lamps from overheating. Replacing the rear cargo ramp entirely, the AGIL created a 50° cone of light, shining vertically down, but able to rotate 50° to the side, illuminating 3.5 sq mi (9.1 km^{2}) at 0.04 Candela from 12,000 ft (3,700 m), or 0.5 sq mi (1.3 km^{2}) at 0.4 Candela from 4,000 ft (1,200 m).

Testing of the BIAS equipped C-123B in support of night strike, search and rescue, and ground operations was carried out eliciting positive feedback from USAF and United States Army (US Army) observers. Ten C-123s were slated to receive the AGIL system under Southeast Asia Operational Requirement (SEAOR) 50, issued on 6 June 1966, the programme was changed to fit the system on 11 Lockheed JC-130A aircraft (re-designated RC-130S), but only two were completed and tested in South-East Asia, where it was found that the aircraft was, understandably, vulnerable to enemy anti-aircraft fire and was generally less effective than the emergent AC-130 gunships. The two BIAS equipped RC-130S, remained in SE Asia for an unknown length of time and were eventually returned to the United States (US) and de-modified by 1974.
