= Daphne and Celeste =

American pop duo

- Origin: New Jersey, United States
- Genres: Teen pop, bubblegum pop, indie pop, electropop
- Years active: 1999–2002; 2015–present
- Labels: MCA, Balatonic
- Past members: Celeste Cruz; Karen DiConcetto
- Website: daphneandceleste.tv

Daphne and Celeste is an American pop duo, consisting of Celeste Cruz and Karen 'Daphne' DiConcetto. Three of their singles reached the top 20 in the UK Singles Chart.

== Success and album reaction ==
They released three singles in the UK: "Ooh Stick You", "U.G.L.Y." and a cover version of Alice Cooper's "School's Out". A full-length album, We Didn't Say That!, was released in June 2000 to generally mixed reviews (Melody Maker awarded it four out of five stars). Another single, "Party", was due in November 2000, but was never released.

During their performance at the Reading and Leeds Festivals in 2000, the crowd's negative reception towards Daphne and Celeste's incongruous music resulted in the duo being bottled by the audience; they left at the end of their second song in a three-song set due to the increasing crowd hostility.

"U.G.L.Y." was criticized by those who felt that it promoted bullying. Daphne and Celeste countered this by saying their lyrics were meant to be tongue-in-cheek. In an interview included on the "U.G.L.Y." single, Daphne stated: "Everyone is indeed ugly in their own special way." Daphne and Celeste made an appearance at Feet First. Daphne and Celeste also had a television and film deal.

Daphne and Celeste were eventually dropped by their label. Their official website closed down in October 2001, and their management company, Perfect Noise Limited, was dissolved in November 2002. After the band broke up Celeste went back to school.

== Later activities ==
In a "Where Are They Now?" interview with Q magazine in 2005, Karen DiConcetto stated that the whole project was "1,000% manufactured", and that the girls auditioned for it in New York in 1998: "I just talked about shoes for an hour." She considered the Reading Festival to be the highlight of the whole experience, and mentioned her work in theatre afterwards, specifically a play called Tourrettaville, written by a boy with Tourette's syndrome. DiConcetto received positive reviews for her portrayal of "CB's Sister" in the FringeNYC award-winning Peanuts spoof Dog Sees God. That production was adapted for an Off-Broadway debut featuring a number of big-name celebrities, including Eliza Dushku and America Ferrera.

In the same interview, Cruz said that she had also worked in theatre and that the duo were planning to break into television. In 2004, Celeste also took the role of "Maria" in the movie Brooklyn Bound. In 2009 she appeared in an Emmy-nominated episode of 30 Rock entitled "Generalissimo". Cruz can also be found on Twitter. In contrast to DiConcetto, she considered the Reading Festival incident the "end of the party for us".

Daphne and Celeste were also interviewed by Bad Horsey towards the end of 2005, with the questions coming from the B3ta web community. The interview was posted on the Estudio Caballito Malo website and featured in the Popbitch newsletter. An edited version was published in the January 2006 edition of the UK publication Fused Magazine.

DiConcetto had a role in Holger Ernst's The House Is Burning, which premiered at the 2006 Cannes Film Festival on 26 May that year. The film was produced by Wim Wenders, and was considered a German production, despite being filmed around New Jersey. In 2005, Daphne and Celeste had a mini reunion tour in the UK with Lolly. Cruz also sang guest vocals on a song for Kent Odessa.

== Reunion and recording ==
In 2011, English music producer Max Tundra contacted Daphne and Celeste through social media to offer his production to make a comeback. On 29 March 2015, the duo had a second reunion and released a single titled "You and I Alone", produced by Max Tundra. The song is the first single from the album Daphne & Celeste Save the World, and was written and produced by Max Tundra.

On 7 February 2018, Daphne and Celeste announced the comeback album with the launch of another song, "BB", produced by Max Tundra. The duo and Tundra performed at London's Boston Music Room to promote the release.

== Discography ==
=== Studio albums ===
List of studio albums, with selected details and chart positions
Title	Details	Peak chart positions	
Title	Details	NZ	UK
We Didn't Say That!	Release date: June 26, 2000; Label: MCA; Formats: CD	4	140
Daphne & Celeste Save the World	Release date: March 30, 2018; Formats: CD, DL, CS, LP	—	—

=== Singles ===
List of singles, with selected chart positions
Year	Single	Peak chart positions				Album
Year	Single	AUS	CAN	NZ	UK	Album
1999	"Ooh Stick You"	54	—	5	8	We Didn't Say That!
2000	"U.G.L.Y."	40	18	7	18	We Didn't Say That!
2000	"School's Out"	96	—	—	12	We Didn't Say That!
2015	"You and I Alone"	—	—	—	—	Daphne & Celeste Save the World
2018	"BB"	—	—	—	—	Daphne & Celeste Save the World
"—" denotes releases that did not chart
