= 24 Weeks =

2016 film

- Film poster
- Directed by: Anne Zohra Berrached
- Written by: Anne Zohra Berrached
- Produced by: Thomas Kufus
- Starring: Julia Jentsch
- Release dates: 14 February 2016 (Berlin); 22 September 2016 (Germany)
- Running time: 103 minutes
- Country: Germany
- Language: German

24 Weeks (German: 24 Wochen) is a 2016 German drama film directed by Anne Zohra Berrached. It was selected to compete for the Golden Bear at the 66th Berlin International Film Festival.

== Cast ==
- Julia Jentsch as Astrid
- Bjarne Mädel as Markus
- Johanna Gastdorf as Beate
- Emilia Pieske as Nele
- Maria-Victoria Dragus as Kati
