= Trombone Champ =

2022 video game

- Developer: Holy Wow Studios
- Publisher: Holy Wow Studios
- Director: Dan Vecchitto
- Engine: Unity
- Platforms: Windows macOS; Nintendo Switch; Meta Quest; PlayStation 5
- Release: Windows; September 15, 2022 macOS; January 24, 2023; Nintendo Switch; September 14, 2023; Unflattened; Meta Quest, PlayStation 5 November 26, 2024
- Genres: Music, rhythm
- Modes: Single-player, multiplayer

Trombone Champ is a 2022 rhythm video game developed and published by American studio Holy Wow Studios. Similar in gameplay to rhythm game titles Guitar Hero and Wii Music, players are tasked with timing their input to music note prompts as they appear on screen, with greater accuracy yielding more points and a higher score. The debut indie title reached widespread popularity on Steam after becoming an Internet meme. It was nominated for the British Academy Games Award for Debut Game, as well as Family Game of the Year during the 26th Annual D.I.C.E. Awards.

A standalone virtual reality version, Trombone Champ: Unflattened, was released in November 2024.

== Gameplay ==
Trombone Champ is a rhythm game in which players use a virtual trombone to play along to various songs, ranging from classical and public domain songs to original tracks and remixes. Players move the mouse to change the pitch of the trombone and use either the mouse button or keyboard keys to play. Players earn points by successfully hitting notes as they slide across the screen, with more points earned by maintaining successive combos and filling a meter that activates Champ Fever when filled, earning even more points. Missing notes, however, will cause the player to lose their combo multiplier and Champ Fever, as well as potentially lose points. Players will also momentarily run out of breath if they hold a note for too long.

At the end of each song, players receive a rank from F to S based on their score, as well as an in-game currency known as Toots. Toots can be spent on in-game trading cards known as Tromboner Cards, which contain humorous and sometimes fictional trivia about musicians, trombones, and game lore. Unwanted or duplicate cards can be transformed into Turds, which can then be spent to create new cards. Hidden throughout the game are non-playable characters who assist the player in becoming the eponymous Trombone Champ. By fulfilling requests such as offering a certain amount of Toots or Turds or trading specific Tromboner Cards, players can unlock additional playable characters, trombone colors, and sound sets. There is also a secret boss level that requires certain conditions to fully defeat and claim the title of Trombone Champ.

== Development ==
Creator Dan Vecchitto had long thought of an arcade video game based on moving a trombone-like slide controller, but the idea was always a joke. He later got the idea of using the mouse cursor to act as the trombone slide, and realized that there was a game concept behind that. His studio, Holy Wow Studios, was a group of part-time developers and while Vecchitto had thought it would take only about six months to realize the game, it ended up taking four years. Two features of the game forced the longer development time: the introduction of the Tromboner Cards, which was to parody loot box systems in other games, and a loose story involving baboons, which Vecchitto created in parody of the Dark Souls series' narratives.

The studio ran a small open playtesting of the game a month ahead of its planned release, from which they received a far greater amount of feedback than expected. When the game was first fully released in September 2022, the reaction to the game went viral, drawing in more players and feedback. Due to this, Vecchitto said they were considering more features as well as potential console ports of the game.

Initially released only for Windows, Trombone Champ became available for macOS users in January 2023. A port for the Nintendo Switch was announced during a Nintendo Direct on September 14, 2023, and released on the same day. The Switch version features alternative control schemes that use the gyroscopic and infrared sensors of the Joy-Con to play the game, as well as local multiplayer support for up to four players.

Localization was added to the game on March 14, 2024, with support for ten languages.

Trombone Champ: Unflattened, a VR adaptation by Flat2VR Studios supporting Meta Quest, Steam VR, and PlayStation VR2, was released on November 26, 2024.

A patch released on March 13, 2025 for Windows and macOS added native support for custom tracks, and an in-game level editor. Support for browsing and subscribing to custom tracks via Steam Workshop was added in a patch released on June 18, 2025.

On December 18, 2025, the first three official DLC packs were released for the game, providing a total of 34 song tracks from the games Undertale, Deltarune, Celeste, and Pizza Tower.

== Track listing ==
As of October 1, 2025, the Trombone Champ base game has a total of 76 playable tracks: 63 arrangements of public domain music, 10 original compositions, and 3 contributed compositions by third-party artists. Developer Holy Wow Studios has expanded the number of playable tracks through free updates, and expressed interest in using future downloadable content to expand the tracklist as well. In addition to the first-party included tracks listed below, there are unofficial mods that allow custom tracks such as "Through the Fire and Flames" and "One-Winged Angel" to be loaded into the game. (In-game support for custom tracks was added in a patch released on March 13, 2025.)

On December 18, 2025, three song packs were released as DLC, providing 34 additional tracks. Seven additional tracks were added to the DLC on March 19, 2026.

Public domain Original Contributed

Title	Composer	Added in
"Also sprach Zarathustra"	Richard Strauss	v1.00 (original release)
"Auld Lang Syne" (Champ Mix)	Robert Burns, Holy Wow Studios	v1.00 (original release)
"Baboons!"	Holy Wow Studios	v1.00 (original release)
"Beethoven's Fifth Symphony"	Ludwig van Beethoven	v1.00 (original release)
"The Blue Danube"	Johann Strauss II	v1.00 (original release)
"Dance of the Sugar Plum Fairy"	Pyotr Ilyich Tchaikovsky	v1.00 (original release)
"Eine kleine" (Champ Mix)	Wolfgang Amadeus Mozart, Holy Wow Studios	v1.00 (original release)
"Eine kleine Nachtmusik" (Trap Mix)	Wolfgang Amadeus Mozart, Holy Wow Studios	v1.00 (original release)
"The Entertainer"	Scott Joplin	v1.00 (original release)
"Entry of the Gladiators"	Julius Fučík	v1.00 (original release)
"God Save the King"	Unknown	v1.00 (original release)
"Hava Nagila"	Abraham Zevi Idelsohn	v1.00 (original release)
"Long-Tail Limbo"	Max Tundra	v1.00 (original release)
"O Canada"	Calixa Lavallée	v1.00 (original release)
"Old Gray Mare"	Thomas Francis McNulty	v1.00 (original release)
"SkaBIRD"	Holy Wow Studios	v1.00 (original release)
"Skip to My Lou"	Unknown	v1.00 (original release)
"Stars and Stripes Forever"	John Philip Sousa	v1.00 (original release)
"The Star-Spangled Banner"	Francis Scott Key, John Stafford Smith	v1.00 (original release)
"Take Me Out to the Ball Game"	Albert Von Tilzer, Jack Norworth	v1.00 (original release)
"Trombone Fuerte"	Holy Wow Studios	v1.00 (original release)
"Trombone Skyze"	Holy Wow Studios	v1.00 (original release)
"Warm-Up"	Holy Wow Studios	v1.00 (original release)
"William Tell Overture"	Gioachino Rossini	v1.00 (original release)
"Rosamunde" (Beer Barrel Polka)	Jaromír Vejvoda	v1.03 (September 21, 2022)
"Jarabe Tapatío"	Jesús González Rubio	v1.05 (September 29, 2022)
"ARE U READY 4 THIZ?"	Holy Wow Studios	v1.07 (October 15, 2022)
"Happy Birthday to You" (Ska Mix)	Patty Hill, Mildred J. Hill, Holy Wow Studios	v1.07 (October 15, 2022)
"Ode to Joy"	Ludwig van Beethoven	v1.07 (October 15, 2022)
"Martian Killbots!!!"	Holy Wow Studios	v1.08 (October 30, 2022)
"The Celebrated Chop Waltz"	Euphemia Allen	v1.085 (November 14, 2022)
"Sakura Sakura"	Unknown	v1.087 (November 30, 2022)
"Taps"	Daniel Butterfield, Oliver Wilcox Norton	v1.088 (December 7, 2022)
"La Marseillaise"	Claude Joseph Rouget de Lisle	v1.088 (December 7, 2022)
"Jingle Bells (Jazz Mix)"	James Lord Pierpont, Holy Wow Studios	v1.089 (December 15, 2022)
"Max Tundra's Silent Night"	Franz Xaver Gruber, Max Tundra	v1.089 (December 15, 2022)
"Mars, the Bringer of War"	Gustav Holst	v1.0897 (January 3, 2023)
"Funiculi, Funicula!"	Luigi Denza, Peppino Turco	v1.091 (January 16, 2023)
"Gymnopédie No. 1"	Erik Satie	v1.093 (January 31, 2023)
"Old MacDonald"	Unknown	v1.095 (February 10, 2023)
"Commander Tokyo, The Dancing Robot"	CV	v1.096 (February 24, 2023)
"The Sailor's Hornpipe"	Unknown, Max Tundra	v1.096 (February 24, 2023)
"St. James Trombonery Blues"	Unknown, Holy Wow Studios	v1.098 (March 17, 2023)
"Danny Boy"	Unknown, Frederic Weatherly	v1.099 (April 1, 2023)
"In the Hall of the Mountain King"	Edvard Grieg	v1.099 (April 1, 2023)
"Flight of the Bumblebee"	Nikolai Rimsky-Korsakov	v1.10 (April 25, 2023)
"Washington Post March"	John Philip Sousa	v1.11 (June 2, 2023)
"When the Saints Go Marching In"	Unknown	v1.11 (June 2, 2023)
"The Barber of Seville"	Gioachino Rossini	v1.13 (August 11, 2023)
"Down by the Riverside"	Unknown	v1.14 (September 13, 2023)
"House of the Rising Sun"	Unknown	v1.15 (October 11, 2023)
"Hino Nacional Brasileiro"	Francisco Manuel da Silva	v1.15 (October 11, 2023)
"She'll Be Coming 'Round the Mountain"	Unknown	v1.16 (October 27, 2023)
"Jasmine Flower (Mo Li Hua)"	Unknown	v1.16 (October 27, 2023)
"Night on Bald Mountain"	Modest Mussorgsky	v1.17 (November 17, 2023)
"Arirang"	Unknown	v1.17 (November 17, 2023)
"O Christmas Tree"	Ernst Anschütz, Melchior Franck	v1.18 (December 12, 2023)
"God Rest Ye Merry, Gentlemen"	Unknown	v1.18 (December 12, 2023)
"Habanera (from Carmen)"	Georges Bizet	v1.19 (January 25, 2024)
"Trombone Skyze (Nasty Mix)"	Holy Wow Studios	v1.19 (January 25, 2024)
"Hello! Ma Baby"	Joseph E. Howard and Ida Emerson	v1.21 (April 16, 2024)
"Korobeiniki"	Unknown	v1.21 (April 16, 2024)
"Toccata and Fugue"	Johann Sebastian Bach	v1.22d (June 4, 2024)
"The Four Seasons (Summer)"	Antonio Vivaldi	v1.22d (June 4, 2024)
"Trombone Champ Medley"	Holy Wow Studios	v1.22d (June 4, 2024)
"The Can-Can"	Jacques Offenbach	v1.23E (September 9, 2024)
"Hungarian Rhapsody No. 2"	Franz Liszt	v1.23E (September 9, 2024)
"Carol of the Bells"	Mykola Leontovych	v1.24B (December 16, 2024)
"Hanukkah Oh Hanukkah!"	Unknown	v1.24B (December 16, 2024)
"Puttin' On the Ritz"	Irving Berlin	v1.24B (December 16, 2024)
"Rhapsody in Blue"	George Gershwin	v1.25E (March 13, 2025)
"Vogons"	Max Tundra	v1.26 (June 18, 2025)
"Item Shopping"	Holy Wow Studios	v1.26 (June 18, 2025)
"Danse Macabre"	Camille Saint-Saëns	v1.28 (October 1, 2025)
"The Skeleton Rag"	The American Quartet	v1.28 (October 1, 2025)
"Hungarian Dance No. 5"	Johannes Brahms	v1.28 (October 1, 2025)
