= U.G.L.Y. =

2000 single by Daphne and Celeste

Single by Daphne & Celeste

from the album We Didn't Say That!
- Released: June 5, 2000
- Genre: Pop
- Length: 3:46
- Label: Universal
- Songwriters: S. Burkes; Michele Chiavarini; Tracy Kilrow; Michael Marz
- Producer: Michele Chiavarini

Daphne & Celeste singles chronology
"Ooh Stick You" (1999)	"U.G.L.Y." (2000)	"School's Out" (2000)

"U.G.L.Y." is a song by American recording duo Daphne & Celeste. It was released on June 5, 2000, as the second single from their studio album, We Didn't Say That!. The song was written and composed by Michele Chiavarini, Tracy Kilrow, Michael Marz and S. Burkes, while its producer was Chiavarini. "U.G.L.Y." is a pop song with a cheerleading style, making it similar in this respect to Toni Basil's song "Mickey". Lyrically, the song consists of insults towards people Daphne & Celeste think are ugly.

Commercially, the song entered the top 10 in New Zealand, where it peaked at number seven. It also reached the top 20 in the UK and the top 40 in Australia and Ireland. The song would later be used in the American box office hit film Bring It On (released August 2000) and its accompanying soundtrack.

== Background ==
After the release of their first single, "Ooh Stick You", the duo decided to release "U.G.L.Y." as the second single from their debut album, We Didn't Say That! (2000). The song was written and composed by Michele Chiavarini, Tracy Kilrow, Michael Marz and S. Burkes, and was produced by Chiavarini. The chorus is taken from the 1985 Fishbone song "Ugly".

== Critical reception ==
Dean Carlson from AllMusic reviewed the album, but did not at that point intend to review the track itself. However, he did go on to review "U.G.L.Y." individually, giving it two and a half out of five stars when so doing. Andy Capper from NME said: "'UGLY' continues the playground putdown vibes of Daphne & Celeste's first single, 'Ooh Stick You'. It's a cool little tune, bolstered by a complete lack of irony or sickly kitsch vibes. Daphne & Celeste are queens in the making." Capper's review of the song was overall positive, but acknowledged nonetheless that it is "a bit ruder" than their previous single.

Retrospective comments came from Alex Denney of Dazed, who called the song one "of the era's most demented pop songs" and "pitched-up playground taunts torn from the pages of Malcolm McLaren's wrong-pop rulebook" along with "Ooh Stick You", while Pete Cashmore of The Guardian described it as "tartrazine-addled trash-pop" and Tim Jonze of the same publication labeled it "chipmunk pop".

== Chart performance ==
The single was a big success in New Zealand, where it peaked at number seven on the New Zealand Singles Chart and was certified platinum. However, it did not do as well in any other country. The song debuted at number forty-seven on the Australian Singles Chart, but only managed to peak at number forty. The song entered the charts at number eighteen in the United Kingdom, where it only managed to go that far.

== Music video ==
The music video was directed by Phil Griffin and filmed on April 16, 2000.

== Track listings ==
UK CD1

1. "U.G.L.Y." (radio edit)
2. "U.G.L.Y." (Tomboy Mix)
3. "U.G.L.Y." (T-Total "Make Over" Mix)
4. "U.G.L.Y." (video)

UK CD2 and Canadian CD single

1. "U.G.L.Y." (radio edit)
2. "U.G.L.Y." (Uglier Mix)
3. Exclusive Daphne & Celeste interview

UK cassette single

1. "U.G.L.Y." (radio edit)
2. "U.G.L.Y." (Uglier Mix)

== Charts ==
Weekly chart performance for "U.G.L.Y."
Chart (2000)	Peak position
Australia (ARIA)	40
Canada (Nielsen SoundScan)	18
Europe (Eurochart Hot 100)	69
Ireland (IRMA)	40
New Zealand (Recorded Music NZ)	7
Scotland Singles (Official Charts)	14
UK Singles (Official Charts)	18

== Other uses ==
The song was featured in the 2000 film Bring It On.

The song has been used for Quaker Oats advertisements, with the tagline "Quaker Oats. Deliciously Ugly".
