= Lucca Film Festival =

Film festival in Lucca, Italy, held yearly

- Formation: 2005
- Founder: Nicola Borrelli, Stefano Giorgi, Andrea Bernardini, Alessandro De Francesco, Andrea Monti, Luca Peretti, Andrea Puccini, Philippe Dijon De Monteton
- Headquarters: Lucca
- Location: Italy
- Fields: Cinema
- President: Nicola Borrelli
- Website: https://www.luccafilmfestival.it/

The Lucca Film Festival, or LFF, is an annual event that has been held in Lucca, Italy, since 2005. The festival offers screenings, exhibitions, conferences, and performances, ranging from mainstream to art-house cinema.

Guests have included international film directors, actors, critics, and artists, such as David Lynch, Oliver Stone, Terry Gilliam, William Friedkin, George Romero, Paul Schrader, Ethan Hawke, Susan Sarandon, Isabelle Huppert, Ruben Östlund, Stefania Sandrelli, Valeria Golino, Laura Morante, Joe Dante, Gaspar Noé, Matthew Modine, Jeremy Irons, Martin Freeman, Giuseppe Tornatore, Marco Bellocchio, Paolo Sorrentino, Gabriele Salvatores, Paolo Virzì, Willem Dafoe, Rutger Hauer, Philip Gröning, Michel Ocelot, Alfonso Cuarón, Matt Dillon, Elio Germano, Thomas Vinterberg, Sandra Milo, Aubrey Plaza, Aleksandr Sokurov, Alba Rohrwacher, Silvio Orlando, Kenneth Anger, Jonas Mekas, Tsai Ming-liang, Michael Snow, Paolo e Vittorio Taviani, Robert Cahen, Lou Castel, Abel Ferrara, Philippe Garrel, György Pálfi, Antoni Padrós, Benedek Fliegauf, Peter Greenaway, John Boorman.

== History and guests ==
The Lucca Film Festival was created in 2005 by Nicola Borrelli, a 21-year-old student of the Faculty of Literature and Philosophy at the University of Bologna. Borrelli, with the help of his parents, friends, volunteers and others, established the VI(S)TA NOVA, a cultural association that organizes and oversees the festival's administration and artistic direction.

Early financial support for the festival came from Banca Toscana, the Municipality of Lucca, the Province of Lucca, Fondazione Cassa di Risparmio, Fondazione Banca del Monte di Lucca and the Region of Tuscany. Today the festival is supported by numerous local and international institutions and private financiers.

In addition to screening new films in competition, the festival includes a selection of out-of-competition screenings, exhibitions and multidisciplinary events, with a particular focus on pioneers of experimental cinema.

=== 2005–2010 ===
The first Lucca Film Festival took place 14–17 September 2005, at the Cinema Centrale and the Teatro San Girolamo. It featured 25 screenings, debates and conferences, including works by emerging directors Hernan Belon, Corinna Schnitt, Corneliu Porumboiu, Jeffrey St. Jules, Lorenzo Recio, Holger Ernst, Pablo Benedetti and Massimo Coglitore. Film critic and writer Enrico Ghezzi introduced the first screening, the Lumière brothers' 1895 short film Workers Leaving the Lumière Factory. The second screening was the 1952 film Roma ore 11:00 directed by Giuseppe De Santis, specially chosen as the favorite film of the late Marco Melani. Other events included an interview with Tonino De Bernardi, an experimental underground film director from Turin. The inaugural festival laid the foundation for what would become signatures of the festival's programming: notable guests such as Spanish director Adolfo Arrieta; a focus on debate and research; the promotion and investigation of contemporary film; and retrospectives focusing on a particular theme or genre, or a director or actor.

The 2007 festival included an exhibition dedicated to the paintings, poems and short films of Aldo Tambellini. Tambellini, who was from Lucca, left Italy for the United States after World War II and became one of the masters of artistic experimentation during the 60s, 70s and 80s. Tambellini came back to Lucca for the first time since childhood to attend the festival.

Other festival guests during this period included experimental directors and artists such as Kenneth Anger (2006), Michael Snow (2007), Jonas Mekas (2008), Christian Lebrat (2008) and Robert Cahen (2009). Snow, Mekas and Cahen appeared in group exhibitions co-produced by the festival at the Fondazione Ragghianti of Lucca. An exhibition with Christian Lebrat, honored in 2008, included a series of installations and screenings inside the Ex Manifattura Tabacchi in Lucca.

=== 2011–2015 ===
Filmmaker and writer Peter Greenaway created a 35-minute original film for the 2013 festival in collaboration with the Fondazione Cassa di Risparmio. The film, titled The Towers | Lucca Hubris, was shot in Lucca and featured Italian actors and dancers from Lucca's Aldes of Porcari. It was screened over two nights in front of the newly-restored Church of San Francesco. The experience inspired Greenaway's 2022 film Lucca Mortis, starring Morgan Freeman, about a writer who takes a sabbatical to visit the city of Lucca.

Also in 2013, the festival debuted a new, multidisciplinary event called Lucca Effetto Cinema. Stefano Giuntini and Cristina Puccinelli, inspired by Beniamino Placido’s book of the same name, created this new event in collaboration with Confcommercio of Lucca and Massa Carrara and with Centro Commerciale Naturale. The event paid homage to nine great films through theater and dance theater performances, scenery, costumes and activities that featured audience participation.

In 2014, Mostre del Festival ("Festival Exhibitions") was created, launching with two exhibitions: (1) the photographic and lithographic works of David Lynch, premiering in Italy, and (2) projects related to the theme "Cinema and Music," which included the "Lost Songs" concert, a selection of music from David Lynch's films written by Angelo Badalamenti. The music was performed by a 60-piece orchestra from the Conservatory Luigi Boccherini conducted by Maestro GianPaolo Mazzoli in the Church of San Francesco. The concert was held inside the Church of San Francesco, attended by David Lynch. Since 2014, "Cinema and Music" has been a recurring part of the festival's program.

The 2014 festival also marked a new partnership with the Fondazione Giacomo Puccini of Lucca. Fondazione Puccini Award was created to honor one or individuals each year who stand out for promoting the legacy of the Lucca-born composer around the world. Director David Lynch received the inaugural Fondazione Puccini Award in 2014.

In 2015, the festival began a partnership with Europa Cinema, organizer of the historic Viareggio film festival founded by Felice Laudadio and Federico Fellini in 1984. On 28 January 2015, a first memorandum of understanding was signed with the Municipality of Viareggio, allowing VI(S)TA NOVA to organize Europa Cinema for three years. The festival accordingly changed its name to the Lucca Film Festival e Europa Cinema and began a tradition of holding events in both Lucca and Viareggio. Guests of the 2015 festival included David Cronenberg, Jeremy Irons, Terry Gilliam, Alfonso Cuarón and Matteo Garrone. The Comitato Nuovi Eventi per Lucca (New Events for Lucca Committee) became a producer and organizer for some of these events. The same year, "Main Performances" and the "Main Event" were added to the program. The 2015 Main Event, "Terry Gilliam’s Movie Circus," was created in collaboration with director Terry Gilliam and involved all the venues located in the square and more than 150 local performers. The "Cinema and Music" event featured a symphony orchestra concert with music by Howard Shore written for David Cronenberg. This year also marked the launch of the M.A.I. Master (Music Applied to Image), a master's degree program at the Conservatory Luigi Boccherini in Lucca that was created in partnership with the festival.

=== 2016–2020 ===
The 2016 festival saw the participation of artists such as George Romero (who had a "zombie citadel" dedicated to him), William Friedkin, Marco Bellocchio and Paolo Sorrentino. The festival expanded beyond Lucca to the city of Barga, which hosted an exhibition dedicated to Barga-born writer and director Gualtiero Jacopetti, director of the 1962 documentary Mondo Cane. The "Cinema and Music" program hosted a special project titled "Cinemagic," which involved several students from the M.A.I. master's program, including composer Stefano Teani who created the original score for the documentary, Puccini by William Friedkin.

The 2016 festival also welcomed the creation of the Feature Film Competition, with 12 films in Italian or European premiere coming from all around the world, Another new category was the Out of Competition Italian premieres, inaugurated with three movies presented both in Lucca and Viareggio, including the world premiere of the new film by Ruggero Deodato. Viareggio hosted a cinema-themed opening party at a renowned club in the passeggiata, one of the most popular streets of the city. A new festival track was dedicated to content that used 360-degree video technology.

Starting in 2016, the festival became more involved in producing films. The festival's interest in 360° filmmaking led to a collaboration with the Festival della Didattica Digitale (Digital Education Festival) and a joint production of the first short documentary about Lucca shot in 360°. The festival, together with the Fondazione Giacomo Puccini, co-produced the 2017 documentary Puccini by William Friedkin, starring the Oscar-winning American director. The festival subsequently co-produced a documentary about Sylvester Zeffirino Poli, a native of the Lucca region who emigrated to the U.S. to become one of the pioneers of cinema and the American independent film industry. The documentary, Mister Wonderland, was supported and co-produced by the Region of Tuscany, Fondazione Cassa di Risparmio of Lucca, Associazione Lucchesi nel mondo and Fondazione Paolo Cresci. It had its world premiere at the 2019 Festival dei Popoli competition in Florence, Italy, where it won the "Il Cinemino" Award.

The 2017 festival included a red carpet in Piazza del Giglio with guests such as Oliver Stone, Willem Dafoe, Sergio Castellitto and Valeria Golino. The festival organized a live concert for the screening of Yasujiro Ozu’s 1934 masterpiece A Story of Floating Weeds in collaboration with Istituto Luigi Boccherini of Lucca and Maxxi Museum of Rome. The execution of the original score, co-written by Maestro Fulvio Pietramala and Maestro GianPaolo Mazzoli, called for a chamber orchestra and was performed using some of the original instruments. The film was shown on the first day of the festival in front of Teatro del Giglio, and an orchestra ensemble played for the occasion. Seven out-of-competition films were presented as Italian or European premieres, including The Headhunter's Calling directed by Mark Williams, with an introduction by Willem Dafoe; The Other Side of Hope by Aki Kaurismäki; and Personal Shopper by Olivier Assays, who was in attendance. The same year, the festival began collaborating with Sky Atlantic to feature a selection of television content. David Lynch presented the Italian premier of the first two episodes of Twin Peaks (season 3) after those of Los Angeles and Cannes. Also in 2017, the festival began a two-year collaboration with Centro Sperimentale di Cinematografia (Experimental Film Center), organizing the first exhibition to honor Federico Fellini and his unproduced film, Il Viaggio di Mastorna, with 50 displays inspired by Fellini's writings.

The 2018 and 2019 festivals included guests such as Rupert Everett, Martin Freeman, Joe Dante, Mick Garris, Michel Ocelot and Rutger Hauer. The 2018 festival featured the world premier of a documentary that the festival co-produced, Storie di Altromare – Omaggio ad Antonio Possenti, about Lucca painter Antonio Possenti. The Lucca Effetto Cinema program established two new awards, one for Best Production Design and one for Best Performance. In 2018, the festival joined the international Film for Our Future Network, dedicated to promoting themes from the 17 sustainable development goals defined by the 2030 United Nations Agenda. The festival organized screenings and master classes tackling these topics and participated in activities planned by the other members of the Film for Our Future Network.

In 2019, the festival partnered with Fondazione Robert F. Kennedy Italia to plan a human rights-focused program dedicated to Europa Cinema and Viareggio. The same year, the festival partnered with ICTF/UNESCO to award the prestigious Fellini Medal to Maestro Paolo Taviani. With funding from the region and the Ministry of Cultural Heritage and Activities and Tourism (MIBACT), the festival expanded activities into the city of Pisa. It organized master classes and film screenings with international authors, collaborating with Manifattura Digitale di Pisa and the Arsenale Cinema.

The festival was largely held online in 2020 due to the COVID-19 pandemic. On-demand and live-streamed film screenings and events were made possible by Più Compagnia, the virtual movie theater for La Compagnia di Fondazione Sistema Toscana. Guests included Matt Dillon, Thomas Vinterberg and Lech Majewski, who each received a lifetime achievement award and were celebrated with wide retrospective events.

=== 2021–present ===
The 2021 festival, which included a mix of in-person and online events, continued its focus on contemporary Italian film production, while also paying homage to films that celebrated the history of cinema. The festival included a reunion of the cast of Mediterraneo by Gabriele Salvatores, 30 years after the film's release, and a celebration of Nino Manfredi on the 100th anniversary of his birth. Other highlights included a master class and lifetime achievement award dedicated to Russian director Aleksandr Sokurov, appearances by actors Silvio Orlando and Alba Rohrwacher, meetings with musician and actor Lodo Guenzi (at his film debut) and filmmaker Michelangelo Frammartino (who presented his film Il Buco), an homage to Ezio Bosso and an event with comedian and actor Lillo in collaboration with ANEC.

In 2021, the festival launched a new collaboration with the Film School Network, a coalition of international film institutions and schools. The festival hosted professors and students from European schools enrolled in the Film School Network and established a new award for student short films. The same year, the festival also registered with the EURASF Network European Academy of Science Film, which brings together festivals devoted to scientific subject matter.

In 2022, the festival returned to its original name, the Lucca Film Festival. The Europa Cinema and TV brand went back to the exclusive management of the Municipality of Viareggio.

The 2023 festival featured lifetime achievement awards for actress Stefania Sandrelli, director Mario Martone, Isabelle Huppert, actress Susan Sarandon, director Gabriele Salvatores and actor Kim Rossi Stuart. For the 10th anniversary of the Lucca Effetto Cinema, the festival held a retrospective of the films, genres, actors and directors of Italian cinema of the 1980s.

== Short-film competition ==
Short films from all over the world are judged by three juries: a jury of international film experts, a popular jury and a university jury.

Short Film Competition Winners
| Year | Title | Director | Origin |
|---|---|---|---|
| 2007 | De Sortie | Thomas Salvador | France |
| 2008 | Vertigo Rush | Johann Lurf | Austria |
| 2009 | Cada Cuatro Fotogramas | Alberto Cabrera Bernal | Spain |
| 2010 | Licht | André Schreuders | Netherlands |
| 2011 | Song | Eponine Momenceau | France |
| 2012 | Go Burning Atacama Go | Alberto Gemmi | Italy |
| 2013 | Studio per Interno con Figure e Suoni (tie) | Rick Niebe | Italy |
| 2013 | Mirror by Mirror (tie) | Sergei Sviatchenko and Noriko Okaku | Denmark/UK |
| 2014 | Red Mill | Esther Urlus | Netherlands |
| 2015 | Jazz for a Massacre | Leonardo Carrano and Giuseppe Spina | Italy/Poland |
| 2016 | Black Code | Louis Henderson | USA |
| 2017 | Death in a Day | Lin Wang | China |
| 2018 | Hoissuru | Armand Rovira | Spain |
| 2019 | Les Enfants du Rivage | Amelia Nanni | Belgium |
| 2020 | Anche gli Uomini Hanno Fame | Francesco Lorusso, Gabriele Licchelli and Andrea Settembrini | Italy |
| 2021 | Monachopsis | Liesbet Van Loon | Belgium |
| 2022 | K-Saram | Alisa Berger | Ukraine |
| 2023 | The Lost Ox | Lei Jiawen | China |

== Feature film competition ==
Founded in 2016, the feature film competition selects films from all over the world for their Italian premiere. Selections are judged by three juries: a jury of international film professionals, a popular jury and a university jury.

Feature Film Competition Winners
| Year | Title | Director | Origin |
|---|---|---|---|
| 2016 | Paradise | Sina Ataeian Dena | Iran, Germany |
| 2017 | By the Time It Gets Dark | Anocha Suwichakornpong | Thailand, Netherlands, France, Qatar |
| 2018 | The Cannibal Club | Guto Parente | Brazil |
| 2019 | Dollhouse: The Eradication of Female Subjectivity from American Popular Culture | Nicole Brending | USA, Canada |
| 2020 | Murmur | Heather Young | Canada |
| 2021 | Copilot | Anne Zohra Berrached | Germany, France |
| 2022 | Yamabuki | Juichiro Yamasaki | Japan, France |
| 2023 | The Cage Is Looking for a Bird | Malika Musaeva | France, Russia |

== Festival venues ==
Projections and meetings

- Teatro-Auditorium San Girolamo – Lucca
- Vincenzo da Massa Carrara Auditorium
- Fondazione Banca del Monte Auditorium
- Cinema Centrale – Lucca
- Cinema Astra – Lucca
- Cinema Moderno – Lucca
- Cinema Centrale – Viareggio
- Cinema Eden – Viareggio
- Teatro del Giglio

Exhibitions

- Fondazione Carlo Ludovico Ragghianti – Complesso di S. Micheletto
- Ex Convento di San Francesco – Piazza San Francesco
- Archivio di Stato di Lucca
- Lu.CCA – Lucca Center of Contemporary Art
- Centro Culturale Agorà – Piazza dei Servi
- Galleria Olio su Tavola
- GAMC

== Related items ==
- Lucca film festival retrospectives
