= We Didn't Say That! =

Studio album by Daphne and Celeste
- Released: June 26, 2000
- Recorded: 1999
- Genre: Pop
- Label: MCA

Daphne and Celeste chronology
We Didn't Say That! (2000)	Daphne & Celeste Save the World (2018)

Singles from We Didn't Say That!
- 1. "Ooh Stick You" Released: January 24, 2000; 2. "U.G.L.Y." Released: June 5, 2000; 3. "School's Out" Released: August 21, 2000

We Didn't Say That! is the debut album by American teen pop duo Daphne and Celeste, released on June 26, 2000. It received mixed reviews from the press, with Dean Carlson of AllMusic and Melody Maker giving it four out of five stars, and NME giving it five out of ten stars.

Besides its three singles, tracks on the album include "Peek-a-Boo" (a song describing a party for otherworldly creatures at Amityville that the girls crash), "Hey Boy" (a ballad that has the girls take it in turns to sing about their feelings and reservations regarding a boy), the somewhat oriental-sounding "I Love Your Sushi" (in which Daphne and Celeste are praised by a man rapping in Japanese) and a disco song called "Star Club".

Daphne revealed that the inspiration for the album was "fun".

It reached number 4 in New Zealand and 140 in the UK.

== Track listing ==
1. "Roll Call" – 3:41
2. "Ooh Stick You" – 3:31
3. "I Love Your Sushi" – 3:59
4. "Peek-a-Boo" – 4:22
5. "Spy Girl" – 3:24
6. "Never Been to Memphis" – 3:13
7. "School's Out" – 3:23
8. "Star Club" – 3:27
9. "U.G.L.Y." – 3:46
10. "Hey Boy" – 4:47

Japan bonus tracks

11. "Ooh Stick You" (Twelve Inch Stick) – 4:24
12. "U.G.L.Y." (Uglier Mix) – 4:52
13. "U.G.L.Y." (Tom Boy Mix) – 6:30

== Charts ==
Chart performance for We Didn't Say That!
Chart (2000)	Peak position
New Zealand Albums (RMNZ)	4
UK Albums (OCC)	140
