= Mad Love =

Mad Love may refer to:

== Books ==
- Mad Love (French L'amour fou), collection of poems by André Breton
- The Batman Adventures: Mad Love, an Eisner and Harvey award-winning comic by Paul Dini and Bruce Timm
- Mad Love (publisher), a short-lived comic book publisher, best known for publishing Alan Moore's Big Numbers

== Film and television ==
- Mad Love (1920 film), starring Lina Cavalieri
- Mad Love, the U.S. distribution title for the 1921 German film Sappho starring Pola Negri
- Mad Love (1935 film), a 1935 American film starring Peter Lorre
- L'Amour fou, a 1969 French film
- L'Amour braque, a 1985 French film
- Mad Love (1995 film), a 1995 American film starring Drew Barrymore
- Mad Love (2001 film), a 2001 Spanish film
- Mad Love (TV series), a 2011 television series
- Mad Love (2015 film), a 2015 French film
- "Mad Love" (The New Batman Adventures), a 1999 episode of the animated series The New Batman Adventures, based on the comic.

== Music ==
=== Albums ===
- Mad Love (Linda Ronstadt album), a 1980 album by Linda Ronstadt
- Mad Love (Robi Draco Rosa album), a concept album by Robi Dräco Rosa
- Mad Love (EP), a 1990 extended play album by Lush
- Mad Love. (JoJo album), a 2016 album by JoJo

=== Songs ===
- "Mad Love" (Sean Paul and David Guetta song), by Sean Paul and David Guetta
- ”Mad Love.” (JoJo song), a 2016 song by JoJo
- "Mad Love" (Mabel song), a 2019 song by Mabel
- "Mad Love", a song by Bush from Black and White Rainbows
- "Mad Love", a song by Dido from the album Still on My Mind
- "Mad Love", a song by Linda Ronstadt from the album Mad Love
- "Mad Love", a song by Neon Trees from the album Picture Show
- "Mad Love", a song by The Pretty Reckless from the album Who You Selling For
- "Mad Love", a song by The Veronicas from the self-titled album The Veronicas

== See also ==
- Amour fou (disambiguation)
