= Ooh Stick You =

2000 single by Daphne and Celeste

Single by Daphne and Celeste

from the album We Didn't Say That!
- Released: January 24, 2000 (UK)
- Length: 3:24
- Label: Universal, Perfect Noize
- Songwriters: Michael Marz, Michele Chiavarini, S. Burkes
- Producer: Michele Chiavarini

Daphne and Celeste singles chronology
"Ooh Stick You" (2000)	"U.G.L.Y." (2000)

"Ooh Stick You" is a song by American pop duo Daphne and Celeste, released as their debut single. It was issued on January 24, 2000, as the lead single from their debut album, We Didn't Say That!. It reached number eight in the United Kingdom, number 40 in Ireland, number 54 in Australia, and number five in New Zealand, where it went platinum for sales of over 10,000.

== Track listings ==
Australian CD single

1. "Ooh Stick You..." (radio edit)
2. "Ooh Stick You..." (Def Master dub)
3. "Ooh Stick You..." (Amen club mix)
4. "Ooh Stick You..." (Twelve Inch Stick)
5. "Ooh Stick You..." (Amen alternative club)
6. "Ooh Stick You..." (Mint Royale vocal dub)

UK CD single

1. "Ooh Stick You" (radio edit) – 3:27
2. "Ooh Stick You" (Twelve Inch Stick) – 4:25
3. "Ooh Stick You" (Mint Royale vocal dub) – 5:20
4. "Ooh Stick You" (video)

UK cassette single

1. "Ooh Stick You" (radio edit) – 3:28
2. "Ooh Stick You" (Twelve Inch Stick) – 4:22

== Charts ==
=== Weekly charts ===
Chart (1999–2000)	Peak position
Australia (ARIA)	54
Europe (Eurochart Hot 100)	42
Ireland (IRMA)	40
New Zealand (Recorded Music NZ)	5
Scottish Singles Sales (Official Charts)	9
UK Singles (Official Charts)	8

=== Year-end charts ===
Chart (2000)	Position
UK Singles (OCC)	92

== Certifications ==
Region	Certification	Certified units/sales
New Zealand (RMNZ)	Platinum	10,000^{*}
^{*} Sales figures based on certification alone.

== Release history ==
Region	Date	Format(s)	Label(s)	Ref.
Australia	1999	CD	Universal; Perfect Noize	
United Kingdom	January 24, 2000	CD; cassette	Universal; Perfect Noize	
New Zealand	March 6, 2000	CD; cassette	Universal; Perfect Noize	
