= Mastered by Guy at The Exchange =

Studio album by Max Tundra
- Released: 2 September 2002
- Studio: The Electric Smile, Bristol; Battenburg; Notre Catford
- Genre: Indie electronic; glitch pop; IDM; progressive; polystylism
- Length: 40:59
- Label: Domino
- Producer: Ben Jacobs

Max Tundra chronology
Some Best Friend You Turned Out to Be (2000)	Mastered by Guy at The Exchange (2002)	Parallax Error Beheads You (2008)

Singles from Mastered by Guy at The Exchange
- 1. "Lysine" Released: 5 August 2002; 2. "Cabasa" Released: 21 April 2003

Mastered by Guy at The Exchange is the second studio album by Ben Jacobs under his stage name of Max Tundra. Released on 2 September 2002 through Domino Records in the United Kingdom and by Tigerbeat6 Records in North America, making it his first album to be distributed in North America. The album was also Max Tundra's first to be released with vocals on nearly all the tracks.

Two singles were released from the album: "Lysine" and "Cabasa". The album failed to chart in both the United Kingdom and the United States, but received high critical acclaim with the music website Pitchfork referring to the album as a "A massive achievement" and placed it on their list of Top 50 albums of 2002.

== Production ==
Mastered by Guy at The Exchange was the first Max Tundra album to incorporate vocals with lyrics. In an interview with Pitchfork, Jacobs explained that the album's songs "are extremely different from those on the first record. When I was writing Some Best Friend You Turned Out to Be, I thought of all sorts of weird and wonderful machines and instruments I could use to make noises, but singing never occurred to me." Jacobs had previously sung in a "Will Oldham pastiche" cover version of Taylor Dayne's "Tell it to My Heart", released as a B-side to the "Ink Me" single.

Jacobs found it difficult to write lyrics as well, saying "I'm getting to grips with writing lyrics, but it is somewhat more difficult than anything I've done before... The lyrics themselves are taking ages to write-- it's something I'm not used to." The other vocalist on the album is Becky Jacobs who is his sister. The album's title is literal; it was mastered by Guy Davie at a studio named The Exchange.

== Music ==
=== Lyrics ===
Mastered by Guy at The Exchange was Jacobs' first album with vocals, and all but one of the tracks have vocals; the lyrics of the songs on the album have been described as being stream of consciousness and are often not rich with subtext, instead being literal or didactic. Max Tundra refers to this on "Labial" with "I only sing about things that happen to me / I never learned to fill my songs with allegory". However, Jacobs also stated that not everything he wrote about actually happened; "half the lyrics on that album are true and half are false, but I'm not gonna tell you which half." The BBC noted themes including "unaffected tales of Food Chemistry, bands splitting up, employment history," while Pitchfork noted themes of "girls he's loved or loves, complaints about his day jobs", and various musical references.

In "Merman", Jacobs wrote about his living situation in a flat where an upstairs neighbor regularly performed DJ sets: "Downstairs they're playing trance again / that awful bendy guitar / up through the floor again / It's 9am till I cry / And Time and a Word, my friend / inspires me more than guitars". The lyrics to "MBGATE" are derived from a passage taken from The Third Policeman by Flann O'Brien. Stylus Magazine described the album's first single, "Lysine", as comically resembling a nutrition manual; "many foods are rich in arginine, concentrate on the ones with more lysine". "Gondry" was written as a lighthearted plea to the French music video director Michel Gondry to direct a music video for Jacobs, with lyrics referencing his music videos for "Let Forever Be" and "Around the World". Gondry himself included the song at the end of his Work of Director retrospective on DVD.

=== Style ===
Max Tundra's vocals were described as "high, mellifluous", resembling Scritti Politti's Green Gartside and Prince. The album's music style was described by AllMusic as a "jumpy collision of found sounds, Squarepusher-type beat thrashes, and jaunty wrestling with "real" instrumentation." A review from the BBC noted that the album's songs "shift gears regularly, ending up in places their openings barely hint at", pointing out "Cabasa" which "starts life as lopsided techno and ends up as a slice of piano driven barrelhouse boogie", and "Hilted" which "mutates from Commodore 64 game soundtrack to sunkissed acoustic guitar pop". The BBC's view was reflected in Stylus Magazine's review the album which stated that "You may have heard the pounding house anthem that "Labial" sounds vaguely like, but the prog flourishes will catch you off guard".

== Release and reception ==
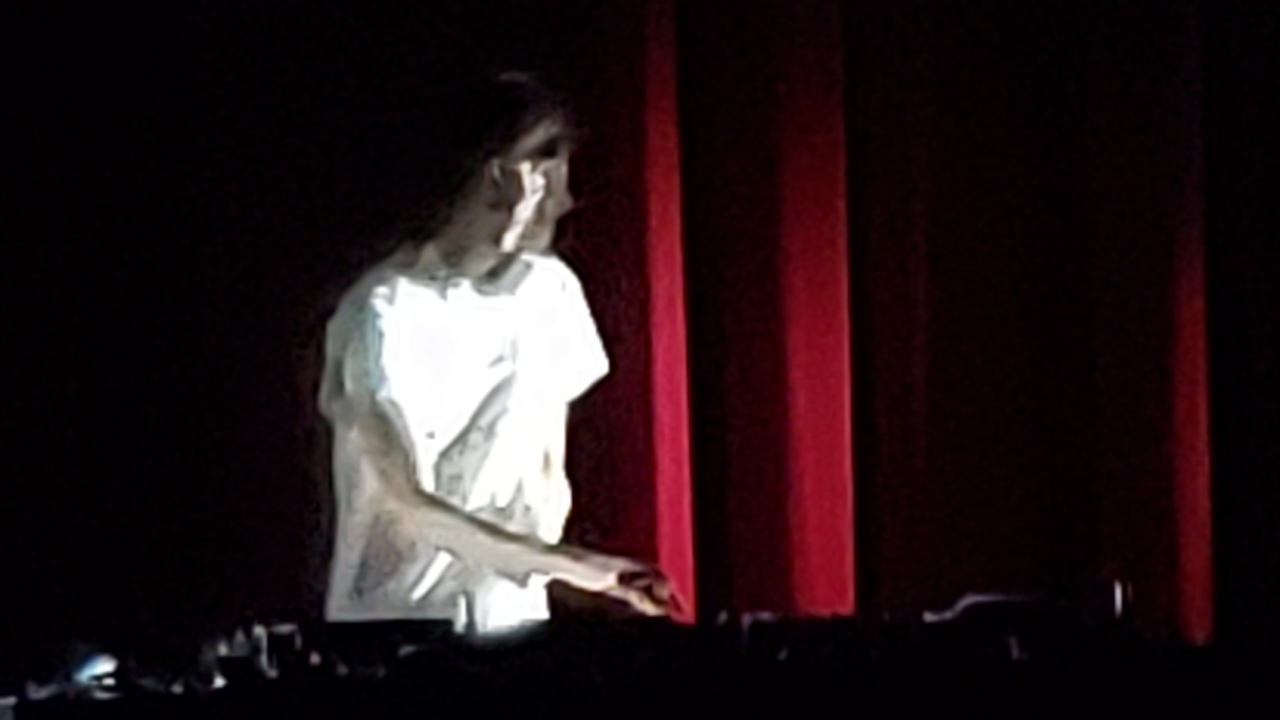
Music producer and PC Music founder A.G. Cook, pictured here in 2022, championed the album.

Professional ratings
Review scores
Source	Rating
AllMusic	4/5 stars
Muzik	4/5 stars
Pitchfork	9.3/10
Playlouder	3.5/5
Stylus Magazine	A
Tiny Mix Tapes	4/5

Mastered by Guy at The Exchange was released in 2002 by Tigerbeat6 in North America and Domino in the United Kingdom. The album failed to chart in the United States and was not reviewed by many critics but was received positively by those who did. Kingsley Marshall of the online music database AllMusic gave the album four out of five star rating, comparing the album's style to Prince and Squarepusher. The BBC's Peter Marsh wrote positively that Max Tundra has "come up with an album which has more ideas per minute than most of his contemporaries can manage over the course of a career." Chris Dahlen of Pitchfork gave the album a very positive review, referring to the album as "A massive achievement" and claiming that there was "so many synths, beeps, beats, glitches, horns, hooks, voices. It shouldn't work. But it does. Perfectly." Pitchfork also listed the album as the 12th best album on their list of top 50 albums of 2002, and 52nd on their list of the top 100 albums released between 2000 and 2004. Pitchfork also placed the album at number 182 on their list of top 200 albums of the 2000s.

In 2022, electronic musician and PC Music founder A.G. Cook praised the album: "Mastered by Guy at the Exchange is a true cult album—a playful monolith that sounds both nothing and everything like the 2000s. Stumbling across it as a teenager, it reinforced a hunch I had: that music is a place where anything could happen, and total chaos could be held together by the lightest of pop hooks. There’s an oddly British quality to Max Tundra’s work, a soft and polite maximalism – pioneering, eccentric and infinitely remixable."

== Track listing ==
All tracks are written by Ben Jacobs.

No.	Title	Length
1.	"Merman"	1:56
2.	"MBGATE"	2:27
3.	"Lysine"	4:02
4.	"Fuerte"	2:07
5.	"Pocket"	0:59
6.	"Cabasa"	7:12
7.	"61over"	1:08
8.	"Lights"	1:39
9.	"Hilted"	2:50
10.	"Acorns"	3:26
11.	"Gondry"	3:26
12.	"Labial"	6:09

== Personnel ==
- Max Tundra – vocals, various instruments, programming
- Becky Jacobs – vocals
- Ben Payne – voice
- Guy Davie – mastering
- Alom Shaha – voice
- Lucy Kendra – voice

== Release history ==
Region	Date	Label	Format	Catalog
United Kingdom	2 September 2002	Domino	LP	WIGLP112
United Kingdom	2 September 2002	Domino	CD	WIGCD112
United States	4 November 2002	Tigerbeat6	CD	MEOW062
