= Daphne & Celeste Save the World =

Studio album by Daphne and Celeste
- Released: March 30, 2018
- Genre: Pop
- Label: Balatonic
- Producer: Max Tundra

Daphne and Celeste chronology
We Didn't Say That! (2000)	Daphne & Celeste Save the World (2018)

Singles from Daphne & Celeste Save the World
- 1. "You and I Alone" Released: March 29, 2015; 2. "BB" Released: February 7, 2018; 3. "Alarms" Released: March 16, 2018

Daphne & Celeste Save the World is the second album by the American pop duo Daphne and Celeste. The album was produced by Max Tundra and released on March 30, 2018, almost 18 years after their debut LP We Didn't Say That!.

== Background and release ==
After releasing three albums of "maximalist" electronic music throughout the 2000s, British producer Max Tundra (real name Ben Jacobs) announced in 2010 that he would be stepping away from his own music to write and produce for other artists. On February 13, 2011, he approached Celeste Cruz of the pop duo Daphne and Celeste on Twitter, proposing the idea of writing a comeback single for them. Cruz replied back on May 20, calling it "a rad idea".

Jacobs stated that he had long admired the duo's previous work: "They were so brash and multicoloured – and they were very different to what I was into at the time, they were a bit of a shock to the system. I wasn't ready for it then, but as the years have evolved, you hear those songs from time and time and think, that’s very much a part of my life. For a while I've thought they were the perfect pop band. They touched a nerve. I remembered them and thought, bloody hell, wouldn't that be a great collaboration."

Jacobs learnt that Cruz and Daphne (real name Karen DiConcetto) had remained in touch long after their original breakup in 2001, and they were equally complimentary towards his own music, as Cruz recounted: "It just sounded cool. He sounded cool. The whole situation sounded weird and cool. His music is weird but it’s appealing, and has a pop sensibility". Together they recorded the song "You & I Alone", with Cruz and DiConcetto recording their vocals from Bushwick, Brooklyn and Jacobs completing the track at his home studio in England. "You and I Alone" was released in March 2015 through Jacobs' own Balatonic label to much critical acclaim.

In February 2017, six years after their initial collaboration, Tundra traveled to a desert retreat near Joshua Tree National Park on a "working holiday" to record the rest of the album with Cruz and DiConcetto. The album was recorded in a makeshift garage studio using Renoise, a track-based digital audio workstation Jacobs began using after selling his Amiga 500. After almost three years of inactivity, the group announced the album was complete in early 2018 and released a second single, "BB," in February.

== Tracklist ==
All songs written by Max Tundra, except track 13 written by Don Van Vliet and Herb Bermann

No.	Title	Length
1.	"Save the World"	1:12
2.	"Sunny Day"	3:35
3.	"B.B."	4:06
4.	"A.L.T.O."	3:39
5.	"16 Stars"	3:35
6.	"Paint Can"	3:33
7.	"You and I Alone"	4:02
8.	"Alarms"	3:36
9.	"Taking Notes"	3:46
10.	"Golden Doldrum"	1:57
11.	"Song to a Succulent"	2:44
12.	"Whatever Happened to Yazz?"	2:52
13.	"Kandy Korn"	4:22

== Personnel ==
- Celeste Cruz - vocals
- Karen DiConcetto - vocals
- Ben Jacobs - keyboards, synthesizer, programming, guitar, vocals on "B.B.", production
