= Max Tundra =

English multi-instrumentalist and producer (b. 1974)

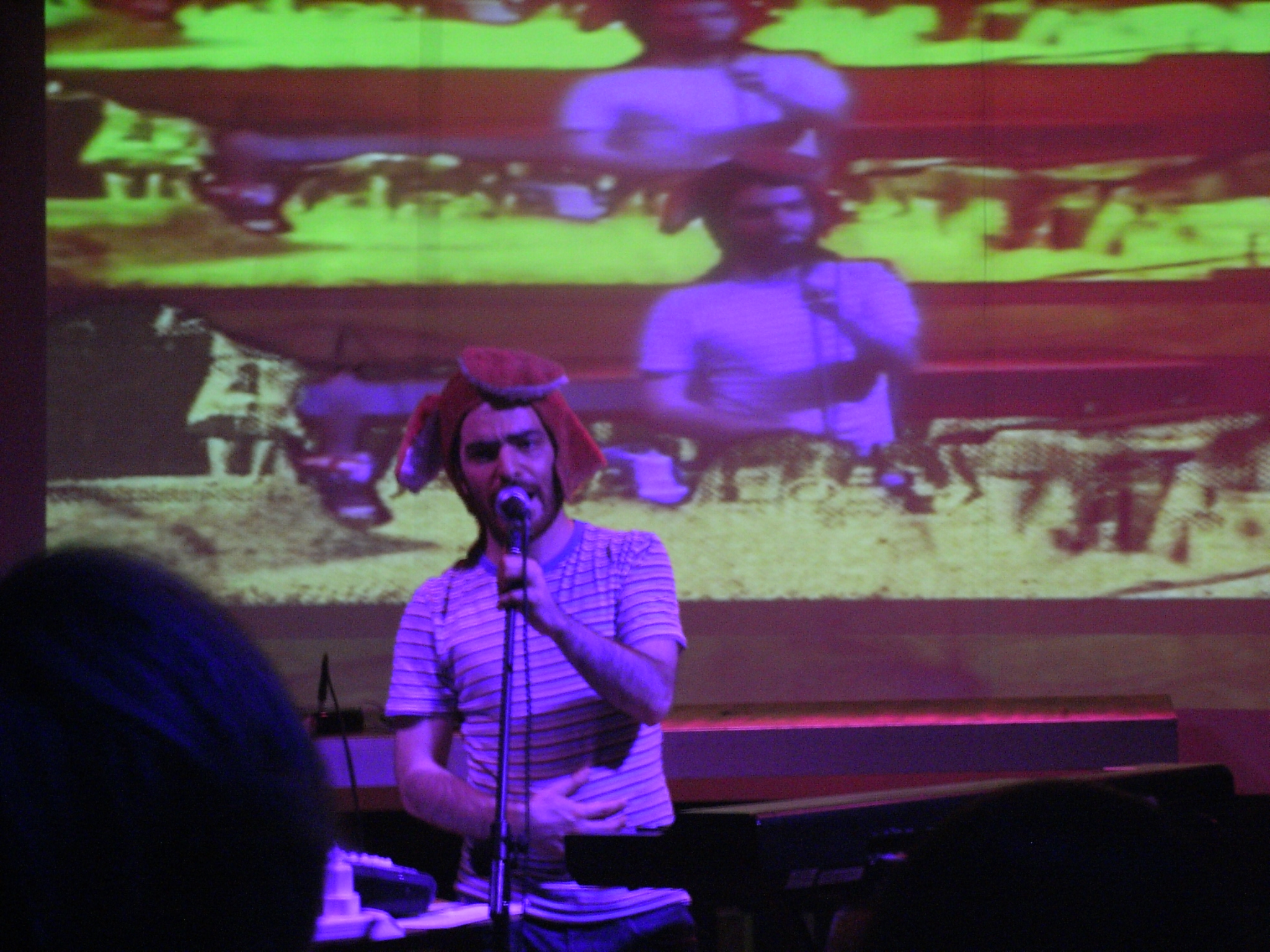
- Max Tundra in 2007

Background information
- Born: Benjamin Thomas Jacobs; June 7, 1974 (age 51)
- Genres: Electronic
- Occupations: Musician, vocalist
- Years active: 1998–present
- Labels: Domino Recording Company
- Website: maxtundra.com

Benjamin Thomas Jacobs (born 7 June 1974), more commonly known by the stage name Max Tundra, is an English multi-instrumental musician, singer and music producer. His work is noted for its maximalist approach, which is predominantly electronic music but incorporates non-electronic styles and instruments. Jacobs' production style has been noted as an influence on the hyperpop style which became prevalent in the 2010s onwards.

Other than his full-length albums, he has also done remix work for bands of varying genres including Franz Ferdinand, Architecture in Helsinki, Kid606 and the Pet Shop Boys. In 2018, Tundra wrote and produced the comeback album by Daphne and Celeste, entitled Daphne & Celeste Save the World.

== Biography ==
Ben Jacobs was born in Camberwell, London. Jacobs grew up taking piano lessons, but mostly enjoyed playing television theme songs and music from adverts. As a teenager, he bought a Commodore Amiga 500 with his bar mitzvah money and began exploring electronic music with it. Jacobs began sending demos out to labels. Warp Records received one song he recorded titled "Children at Play" and released it as a single in 1998. Following this single his debut album Some Best Friend You Turned Out to Be was released by Domino Records in the UK in 2000.

The instrumental record was followed up with Mastered by Guy at the Exchange, his first to use vocals. Max Tundra explained "When I was writing Some Best Friend, I thought of all sorts of weird and wonderful machines and instruments I could use to make noises, but singing never occurred to me. I had never considered using my voice on any Max Tundra record ever, but hey, I like to keep things varied, so this time round I figured what the hell!" Mastered By Guy at the Exchange received positive reviews, including being named the 12th top album of the year on Pitchfork Media's list of top 50 albums of 2002.

In 2006, Max Tundra released a new single as part of Tomlab records "Alphabet Series" for the Letter M. The single included a cover of The KLF's "What Time Is Love?", made with his Amiga in 1989. In 2008, Max Tundra toured the UK with Hot Chip and released the album Parallax Error Beheads You which he had worked on for six years. The first single from the album was "Will Get Fooled Again" and was released on 29 September 2008.

On 5 June 2010, Max Tundra effectively announced on Twitter that Parallax Error Beheads You would be the final Max Tundra album. However, in a radio interview from May 2011, he mentioned that he was only taking a break in order to focus on his remix and production work. On 30 March 2012, he claimed on Twitter that he had begun working on a new Max Tundra album.

In 2011, Max Tundra contacted pop duo Daphne and Celeste through social media to offer his production to make a comeback. A single for their song "You and I Alone" was released in 2015, written and produced by Max Tundra. Three years later, Max Tundra announced a full-length studio album he had produced for Daphne and Celeste set for release as Daphne & Celeste Save the World on 30 March through Max Tundra's Balatonic label.

In July 2022, Max Tundra resurfaced with Remixtape, an EP composed of remixes and cover versions contributed by artists such as A.G. Cook, Kero Kero Bonito, Katie Dey, Julia Holter and Tundra himself, released to coinicide with all three Max Tundra albums being remastered on coloured vinyl. Tundra also contributed an original track, "Long-Tail Limbo", for the video game Trombone Champ.

== Musical style ==
Max Tundra has been noted for his maximalist approach to composition and music production, often incorporating complex chord structures, experimental recording techniques, and a diverse range of instrumentation, many of which he has taught himself how to play. Whilst primilarly noted as an electronic artist, Tundra's music draws influence from a wide range of musical styles, including jazz, progressive rock, folk, indie rock, classical, R&B, UK garage, house, show tunes, chiptune, glitch, and musique concrete, often criss-crossing within songs. The density of his work has been considered a predecessor to the hyperpop scene, though Jacobs claims that he never set out to make a "proto-hyperpop LP", and that his music reflects more of an "eclectic sprawl of genre-free pop". Jacobs has cited Todd Rundgren, Frank Zappa, Yes, Art of Noise, Cardiacs, XTC, Scritti Politti, Kate Bush and Autechre as amongst his main influences.

In 2021, Jacobs stated that "At the start of my career I decided I wanted to invent a new style of music with each song. I'm not sure I always achieved that, but I'm proud of how stylistically varied the three Max Tundra albums are. On the first LP (Some Best Friend You Turned Out To Be) it really was an everything-but-the-kitchen-sink multi-instrumental approach, trying to create music that didn't sound like anything else out of mbires, melodicas and mallets. As the albums progressed, this approach transformed into a kind of "mutated pop" aesthetic, where I would take at least the raw materials of existing genres and remould them into new shapes. Each LP is more electronic than its predecessor, as I dropped traditional instruments in favour of more purely synthetic sounds".

== Discography ==
=== Albums ===
Year	Title
2000	Some Best Friend You Turned Out to Be: Released: 25 April 2000; Label: Domino; Formats: CD, LP
2002	Mastered by Guy at the Exchange: Released: 2 September 2002; Label: Domino / Tigerbeat6; Formats: CD, LP
2008	Parallax Error Beheads You: Released: 20 October 2008; Label: Domino; Formats: CD, LP

=== Singles ===
Year	Title	Album	Label
1998	"Children at Play"	non-album single.	Warp
2000	"Cakes"	Some Best Friend You Turned Out to Be	Domino
2000	"Ink Me"	Some Best Friend You Turned Out to Be	Domino
2001	"QY20 Songs"	non-album single	Domino
2002	"Lysine"	Mastered By Guy at the Exchange	Domino
2003	"Cabasa"	Mastered By Guy at the Exchange	Domino
2006	"Alphabet Series: M"	non-album single	Tomlab
2008	"Will Get Fooled Again"	Parallax Error Beheads You	Domino
2020	"Pets" (featuring David Liebe Hart)	non-album single	David Liebe Hart Ministries

=== Remixes ===
Year	Remixed track	Released on	Artist(s)
1998	"Helicon 2"	Kicking a Dead Pig: Mogwai Songs Remixed	Mogwai
2000	"Dandy"	Kid 606 and Friends Volume 1	Kid606
2000	"Wow"	"Wow"	Janek Schaefer
2001	"Lilypad"	Altered and Proud	Ruby
2002	"Long Distance"	"Long Distance"	Turin Brakes
2002	"Whindie"	Whindie	Ambulance
2004	"Alone, Together"	"All Hail The Black Emperor"	The Strokes
2004	"The Owls Go"	A Commemorative Keepsake	Architecture in Helsinki
2004	"Mein Nehi Jana"	"Mein Nehi Jana"	Future Pilot AKA
2005	"Decent Days and Nights"	"Decent Days and Nights"	The Futureheads
2005	"The Effect on Me"	"The Effect on Me"	Mint Royale
2006	"Do You Want To"	"The Fallen"	Franz Ferdinand
2006	"I'm with Stupid"	"I'm with Stupid"	Pet Shop Boys
2007	"Fledermaus Can't Get It"	"Fledermaus Can't Get It"	Von Südenfed
2007	"Hold Music"	Like It or Not	Architecture in Helsinki
2007	"Bullets"	"Bullets"	Tunng
2008	"Enough About Human Rights"	(forthcoming)	Moondog
2021	"Soft Landing"	Apple vs. 7G	A. G. Cook

=== Other appearances ===
Year	Title	Appears on	Label
2000	"Commando (Defghi Otto)" (The Monsoon Bassoon cover)	Wall of Suss #2 (split 7-inch with The Monsoon Bassoon)	Weird Neighbourhood
2000	"Coppice Lament"	No Division	Mind Horizon
2000	"Five Minutes, Five Seconds" (Kid606 vs. Max Tundra)	Kid606 and Friends Vol. 1	Tigerbeat6
2001	"Runaround"	Fresh Fruit	Lo Recordings
2001	"Typify Dialup Toll Amateurishness (Fuck Coldplay)"	Freakbitchlickfly	Violent Turd
2001	"The Bill" (cover of "Overkill" by Andy Pask and Charlie Morgan)	Tigerbeat6 Inc.	Tigerbeat6
2002	"Theme From "My Place In the Universe""	TARPOP1	Tar100mg
2002	"Life In a Lift Shaft"	House of Stairs Vol 1: Useless In Bed	House of Stairs
2007	"A Truce"	David Shrigley's Worried Noodles	Tomlab
2009	"Playboy" (Hot Chip cover)	Blood on the Tracks	Domino
2010	"Will Bleed Amen" (featuring Sarah Measures) (Cardiacs cover)	Leader of the Starry Skies: A Tribute to Tim Smith, Songbook 1	Believers Roast
2013	"Fold 11"	The Exquisite Corpse Game	Believers Roast
2021	"Rubberneck" (featuring Arca)	Kick III	XL
2022	"Long-Tail Limbo"	Wow I Might Refer To This As Tooting: The Trombone Champ Soundtrack Collection Vol. 1	Holy Wow
