= The House Is Burning (film) =

2006 film

- Film poster
- Directed by: Holger Ernst
- Written by: Holger Ernst
- Produced by: Alex Gibney; Peter Schwartzkopff; Wim Wenders
- Starring: John Diehl
- Cinematography: Stefan Grandinetti
- Edited by: Silke Botsch
- Release date: 26 May 2006
- Running time: 97 minutes
- Country: Germany/United States
- Language: English
- Box office: None recorded

The House Is Burning is a 2006 German, English-language independent drama film, filmed in the United States and directed by Holger Ernst and starring John Diehl. The film did not secure a commercial theatrical release in the U.S., and failed to generate any recorded box office revenue.

== Plot ==
Set over the course of a single sweltering day in a bleak New Jersey suburb, the film follows the lives of four disillusioned suburban youth struggling to find purpose. As the summer heat intensifies, their parallel struggles collide, leading to a series of volatile confrontations.

== Cast ==
- John Diehl as Mr. Garson
- Melissa Leo as Mrs. Miller
- Julianne Michelle as Terry
- Robin Lord Taylor as Phil
- Erik Jensen as Carl
- Harley Adams as Steve Garson
- Nicole Vicius as Valerie
- Joe Petrilla as Mike Miller
- Carson Grant as The Preacher
- David Tennent as Jason
- Emily Meade as Anne
- Robert Scorrano as Army Recruiter
- Jeff Green as Army Officer
- Samantha Ressler as Stella Miller
- Karen DiConcetto as Sharon
- Polly Chung as Bank Officer

== Production and budget ==
The House Is Burning was produced as an independent film, and filmed in the United States. The drama was produced on a small scale, with the production team noting that the film could only be financed because every single member of the cast agreed to reduce their fee in favor of a backend financial stake.

== Release and box office ==
It was screened out of competition at the 2006 Cannes Film Festival.

The film did not secure a commercial theatrical release in the U.S., and failed to generate any recorded box office revenue. Because it relied on a backend financing model where the cast agreed to deferred salaries tied to profit margins, the film's lack of commercial marketplace distribution meant the film did not yield any financial returns for its investors or cast members.
