= Anne Zohra Berrached =

German film director and screenwriter

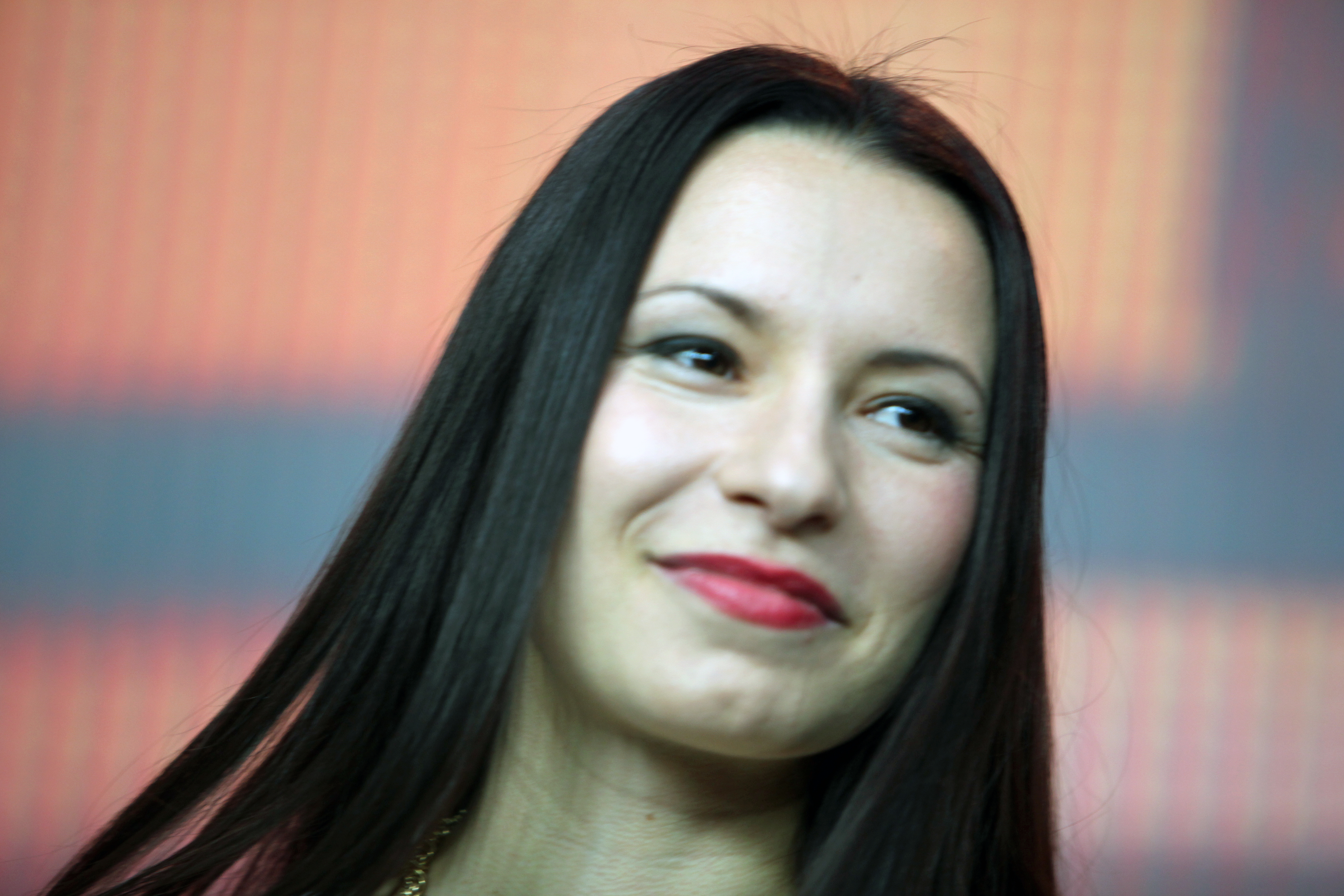
Portrait of Anne Zohra Berrached in 2016

Anne Zohra Berrached (born 31 July 1982 in Erfurt) is a German film director and screenwriter.

== Early life and education ==
The daughter of an Algerian father, Anne Zohra Berrached was born and raised in the German Democratic Republic (also known as East Germany). Following specialized secondary school in art, she earned a university degree in social pedagogy. She worked for two years in London as a drama teacher before spending one year abroad in Cameroon and Spain.

== Career ==
In 2009, Berrached directed her debut short film Der Pausenclown (The Class Clown) about a Lebanese comedian and neighbor of hers from Neukölln, Berlin. Later, the movie was broadcast on the German television network WDR. In the same year, after an unsuccessful attempt to enroll in Film University Potsdam, she enrolled in Filmacademy Baden-Wurttemberg in Ludwigsburg, a noted film school in Germany.

Her first feature-length film Zwei Mütter (Two Mothers) is about a lesbian couple who audition men to collect their sperm for having a child. In 2013, the film received the FGYO-Prize Dialogue en perspective at the 63rd Berlin Film Festival.

In February 2016, Berrached presented her second film, 24 Wochen (24 Weeks), at the 66th Berlin Film Festival. 24 Weeks was her final degree project before she graduated from film school. The movie is about a pregnant comedian (Julia Jentsch) and her husband (Bjarne Mädel) deciding over a legal abortion for their unborn child diagnosed with down syndrome. This was the first film to address the topic of legal late-term abortion and was considered taboo for over 90% of women in Germany facing a similar situation. The film received the Guild German Filmartist (Gilde Deutscher Filmkunsttheater) award for best picture and the Silver Lola for Best German Film at the 2017 German Film Awards.

In 2018, she was appointed to the international jury of the 53rd Chicago Film Festival. In 2021, alongside M. Night Shyamalan and Connie Nielson, she was appointed to the international jury of the main competition at the Berlin International Film Festival.

Her third feature film, Die Welt wird eine andere sein (international title: Copilot), was funded in part by the Arte Grand Accord grant. Filmed in Florida and Lebanon, the relationship drama is based on the biography of Lebanese terrorist Ziad Jarrah. With an estimated budget of six million euros, the film was the largest feature Berrached has directed to date. The film was selected for the Panorama section of the 2021 Berlin International Film Festival. It won the first prize in both the Feature Film Competition and the Popular Jury Competition at the 2021 Lucca Film Festival.

She directed three episodes of the ARD television crime series Tatort. Tatort: Der Fall Holdt reached an audience of 10.22 million viewers when it was first broadcast in 2017. Tatort Dresden episode "Das kalte Haus" received the German Television Academy Award in the category of Best Director in 2022.

Berrached has taught workshops on directing for the Goethe-Institut in Cairo, the Festival International de Cine de Guadalajara in Mexico and the Filmakademie Baden-Württemberg in Germany.

In 2025, her mini series with eight-episodes A Better Place were seen in primetime on ARD, Germany and Canal Plus, France. It poses the question: What would a world without prisons be like?

For the Spanish, Polish, Swiss, German coproduction Each of Us she shared the directors title with three female directors. Diane Krüger is starring as one of the four main characters. The film is in post production.

Anne Zohra Berrached lives and works in Berlin.

== Filmography ==
- 2011: E. + U. (Shortfilm) – Director
- 2012: Saint&Whore (Documentary) – Director, Screenplay
- 2012: Hunde wie wir (medium length movie) – Director
- 2013: Die rechte Hand (medium length movie) – Director
- 2013: Two Mothers – Director, Screenplay
- 2016: 24 Weeks – Director, Screenplay
- 2017: Millennials – Actress
- 2017: Tatort: Der Fall Holdt - Director
- 2021: Die Welt wird eine andere sein / Copilot – Regie, Drehbuch
- 2021: Tatort: Das kalte Haus – Director, Screenplay
- 2022: Tatort: Liebeswut – Director

== Awards ==
- 2012: ProSiebenSat1 Prime Time Prize, Screenplay Award - Mars Venus Venus Mars
- 2013: 63rd Berlinale, Directing Award of the section "Dialogue en Perspective" of the Berlinale Perspektive Deutsches Kino - Two Mothers
- 2013: Best Documentary Film, Fetish Film Festival - Holy and Whore
- 2013: First Steps No Fear Award - Two Mothers
- 2013: Studio Hamburg Young Talent Award: Nomination - Two Mothers
- 2014: Caligari Promotional Award - 24 Weeks
- 2016: Best Film in Competition, 66th Berlinale, GUILDE Film Award - 24 Weeks
- 2016: Best Screenplay, Filmkunstfest Mecklenburg-Vorpommern - 24 weeks
- 2016: Best Production Design, Neisse Film Festival - 24 weeks
- 2016: Audience Award, Filmkunstfest Mecklenburg-Vorpommern - 24 weeks
- 2016: Best Director, Filmkunstfest Mecklenburg-Vorpommern - 24 weeks
- 2016: Best Director, 27th Filmfest Emden Norderney - 24 weeks
- 2016: Studio Hamburg Young Talent Award, Best Director and Best Production - 24 weeks[5]
- 2016: Saarland Medien GmbH Award of the Günter Rohrbach Film Prize for 24 Weeks.
- 2017: German Film Award 2017 Lola in Silver for 24 Weeks
- 2017: DEFA Foundation Award for Young Cinema for Anne Zohra Berrached
- 2020: Grand Prize, Feature Film Competition Lucca Film Festival - Die Welt wird eine andere sein (international title: Copilot)
- 2020: Main Award, Popular Jury of Lucca Film Festival - Die Welt wird eine andere sein (international title: Copilot)
- 2020: Best Director, Student Jury, Lucca Film Festival - Die Welt wird eine andere sein (international title: Copilot)
- 2022: Nomination, Best Director, DafFNE 2022
