= Amour fou =

L'Amour fou (French for "crazy love") may refer to:

== Books ==
- L'amour fou (Mad Love), poetry collection by André Breton, 1937
- L'Amour fou, a 2012 novel by Françoise Hardy

== Films and television ==
- L'Amour fou (1969 film)
- Amour Fou (1993 film)
- L'Amour fou (2010 film)
- Amour Fou (2014 film)
- Amour Fou (The Sopranos)

== Music ==
- Amour Fou, a 1984 album by Kanda Bongo Man
- L'Amour fou (album), a 2012 album by Françoise Hardy, or the title song
- "L'Amour Fou, a 2011 song by Jenifer

== See also ==
- Mad Love (disambiguation)
- Folie à deux
