= Parallax Error Beheads You =

Studio album by Max Tundra
- Released: 20 October 2008
- Studio: The Electric Smile, Securisound, and Voltone Studios
- Genre: IDM, indie electronic, glitch, progressive pop
- Label: Domino
- Producer: Ben Jacobs

Max Tundra chronology
Mastered by Guy at The Exchange (2002)	Parallax Error Beheads You (2008)

Singles from Parallax Error Beheads You
- 1. "Will Get Fooled Again" Released: 29 September 2008

Parallax Error Beheads You is the third studio album by Max Tundra, the stage name of electronic musician Ben Jacobs. The album was released on 20 October 2008 through Domino Records.

== Writing and recording ==
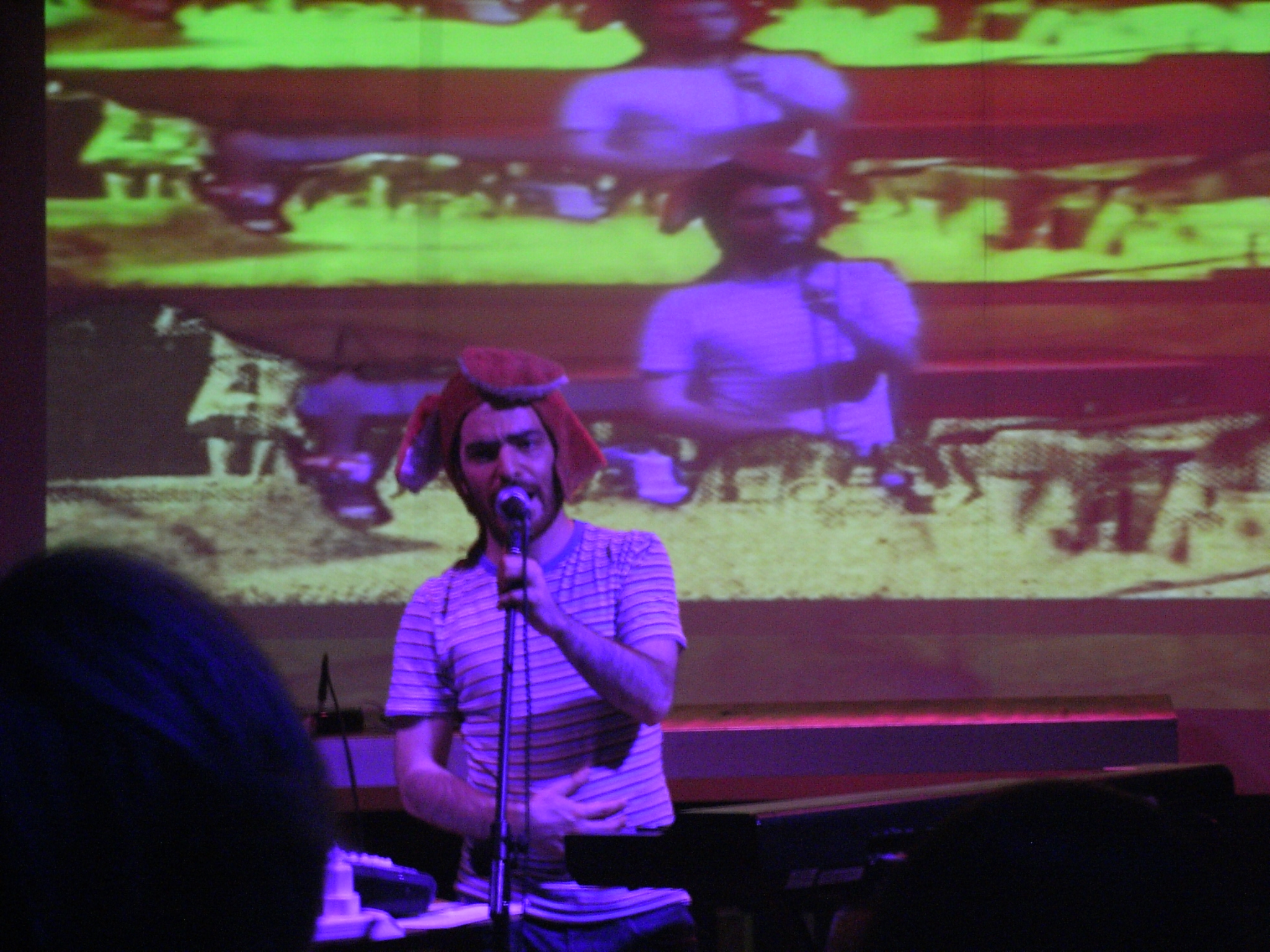
Max Tundra, real name Ben Jacobs, spent six years working on the album.

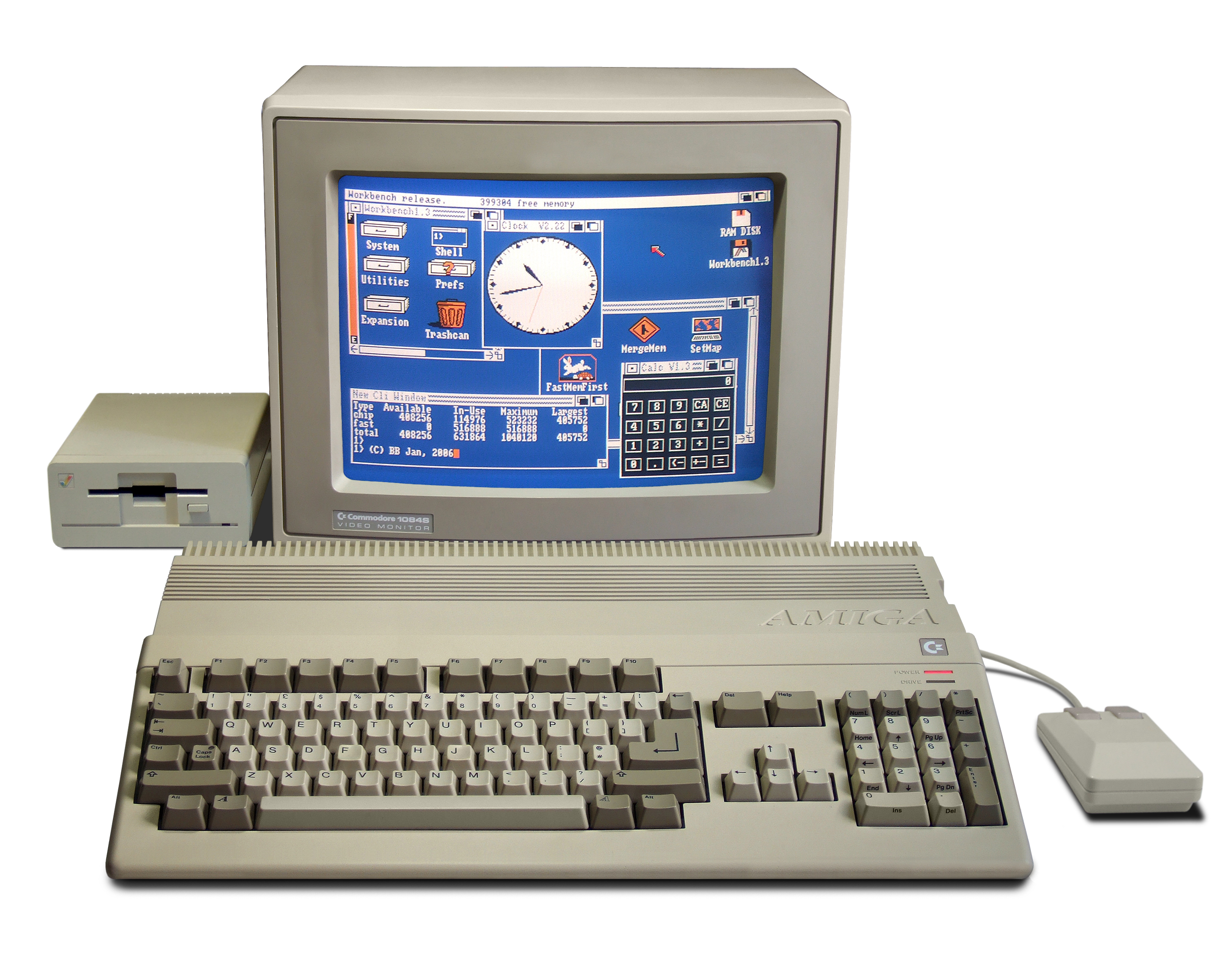
An Amiga 500 was used to record the album.

Jacobs worked on Parallax Error Beheads You for six years. It was recorded and programmed at Jacobs' home studio in Bristol at the time, The Electric Smile, using his Amiga 500, though he also recorded piano and drum parts at Securisound and Voltone Studios, respectively. The album's title refers to the 'parallax error' phenomenon often found in cheap cameras, in which the viewfinder and the lens are aligned differently, resulting in images that are slightly lower in frame than what the photographer perceives.

Jacobs noted that the album makes less use of traditional musical instruments than his previous releases, and aimed for a purely synthetic sound, "though you'll hear the odd cello on this LP". Jacobs stated that he was going through a "gut-wrenching" breakup at the time of writing, which provided inspiration for the album's lyrical content. Unlike his previous vocal-based album Mastered by Guy at the Exchange, Jacobs handled all the vocals on the album himself. He attributed his newfound confidence as a singer down to attending weekly karaoke nights at his local bar.

=== Songs ===
The opening track "Gum Chimes" is a baroque pop-inspired song built around a "bouncy" harpsichord sequence, featuring a trumpet Jacobs had bought for £15 during the recording of his debut album. "Will Get Fooled Again" was picked as the album's lead single, and deals lyrically with Jacobs' experiences with online dating, making reference to social networking sites MySpace and Friendster. Second single "Which Song" took inspiration from Scritti Politti, with Jacobs stating he "really went all-out on the clean yet complex Arif Mardin's production vibes", and that he was "stupendously proud" of the song's imminent chord progression. The track references the musician Kevin Blechdom, also known as "Kevy B", with Jacobs suggesting "you could say this is a song about whether a hypothetical song is about her".

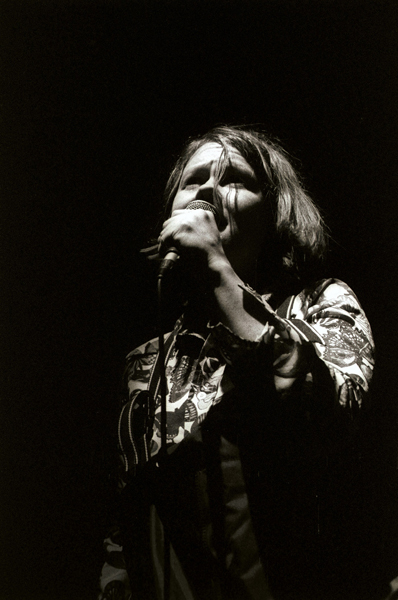
Musician Kevin Blechdom is the main subject of the track "Which Song".

With "My Night Out", Jacobs stated that he wanted to create a track comprised entirely of chords he had rarely heard "in the most ludicrous order imaginable. It was fun to play". The track "Orphaned" was constructed out of short snippets of hundreds of vinyl records, painstakingly carefully to G♯ or D♯, creating a dense collage to fit the track's melody. The samples were chopped in an Akai S3000 before being brought into the Amiga for sequencing. Jacobs claims the process took roughly six months to complete. "Nord Lead Three" is a tribute to the synthesizer of the same name. Jacobs was influenced by Stereolab's album Margerine Eclipse to record the track in dual mono, a recording technique whereby the left and right channels have entirely different signals. The track's "clatty" drums were recorded using a dictaphone, before being panned hard left and right in the studio.

Jacobs singled out the track "The Entertainment" as a "good example of my obsession with trying to make unpredictable music", and was an attempt at creating a mini-LP in one song, stating that he "would probably have said 'no, that's not done yet' several times" during its creation. "Number Our Days" is a "weird" XTC-inspired song about a person who loses his faith after an unpleasant incident, with Jacobs describing it as a "perfect" pop song that culminates in a "satanic" coda that is "in every key and no key at all". "Glycaemic Index Blues" was recorded "off the grid", in which all the sounds were played by hand rather than sequenced, "hence the queasy BPM and slippery rhythms". Jacobs made extensive use of a hardware autotune module on the album's vocals, which were taken up "to the max" for this particular track.

For the closing track "Until We Die", Jacobs attempted to create a vibe based on the song "Our Song" by Yes, stating that he "always loved songs where the singing surprises you by starting late" and that he enjoyed writing the "ridiculous, overblown" lyrics for it. The track is also the album's longest, running just over eleven minutes. The song took nine months to record, and its extensive production proved too much for the Amiga's memory drive, so Jacobs had to save it on two floppy disks and stitch both parts together manually.

== Release ==
On 29 September 2008, the first single from the album titled "Will Get Fooled Again" was released on 7″ vinyl, featuring a cover version of "So Long, Farewell" as its B-side, and as a digital download. A music video for the single was directed by Joji Koyama, and was first uploaded to Tundra's MySpace on 17 September 2008.

Parallax Error Beheads You was released in the United Kingdom on 20 October 2008 and in the United States on 18 November 2008 on LP and compact disc. A special edition was released as a can of Max Tundra's Kosher Chicken Soup that includes a special link to download a copy of his album plus a bonus download album of covers called Best Friends. Best Friends is a reinterpretation of Max Tundra's first album Some Best Friend You Turned Out To Be by his friends.

On 5 June 2010 Jacobs effectively announced on Twitter that Parallax Error Beheads You would be the final Max Tundra album, but on 30 March 2012 he tweeted that he had "started work on the new Max Tundra album".

== Reception ==
Professional ratings
Review scores
Source	Rating
AllMusic	4/5 stars
The Guardian	4/5 stars
The Independent	Favourable
Mojo	3/5 stars
Now	3/5 stars
Pitchfork	8.5/10
PopMatters	8/10
Tiny Mix Tapes	3/5 stars
URB	4/5 stars

Initial critical response to Parallax Error Beheads You was positive. At Metacritic, which assigns a normalised rating out of 100 to reviews from mainstream critics, the album has received a score of 76, based on 18 reviews.

Jude Rogers of The Guardian gave the album four stars, calling it "an experimental albums on paper, running cellos, guitars and trumpets through a Commodore Amiga, but to the ears, it's a pop tour de force, bursting with bright, bouncy hooks, warped lyrics about love, and Jacobs' high, tender vocals".

Simon Price of The Independent was equally enthusiastic, stating that "Parallax Error Beheads You sounds like a previously unimaginable hybrid of Steely Dan and Scritti Politti, or a compendium of 1970s kids' TV themes gone berserk, except with a modern vocabulary of eBay, iPods and Myspace. It's so hyper-melodic that it almost flips over into being dissonant and tuneless... but not quite. Mr and Mrs Tundra can be very proud of their boy."

K. Ross Hoffmann of AllMusic awarded the album four stars out of five, opining that it "emerges as easily the most infectious, engaging, and approachable of Tundra's albums so far, generally shoehorning his manic creativity into reasonable approximations of conventional pop song structures, framed around abundant, quirky hooks and appealingly restrained pop-soul vocals".

== Track listing ==
All songs by Ben Jacobs

1. "Gum Chimes" – 3:26
2. "Will Get Fooled Again" – 3:20
3. "Which Song" – 5:21
4. "My Night Out" – 1:56
5. "Orphaned" – 4:25
6. "Nord Lead Three" – 2:41
7. "The Entertainment" – 2:58
8. "Number Our Days" – 3:32
9. "Glycaemic Index Blues" – 3:05
10. "Until We Die" – 11:03

== Personnel ==
- Ben Jacobs – performer, design
- Matthew Cooper – design
- Nilesh "Nilz" Patel – mastering
- Eleni Tsaligopoulou – design

== Release history ==
Region	Date	Label	Format	Catalog	Ref.
United Kingdom	20 October 2008	Domino	LP	WIGLP168	
United Kingdom	20 October 2008	Domino	CD	WIGCD168	
United Kingdom	20 October 2008	Domino	DD	WIG168D	
United States	18 November 2008	Domino	CD		
United States	18 November 2008	Domino	LP		
