= Natural light =

Natural light may refer to:

- Daylight
- Sunlight
- Moonlight
- Natural Light, a brand of beer
- Natural Light (film), a 2021 Hungarian-French-German drama

== See also ==
- Daylighting (architecture), the use of daylight to illuminate interior spaces
