= Holger Ernst =

German film director (born 1972)

Holger Ernst / HOLGERSON (born 1972) is a German script writer and film maker based in Berlin. He also lives in New York City and Los Angeles.

== Career ==
He graduated from the Department of Film at the Academy of Arts in Kassel, specializing in writing and directing. He directed several short films and commercials which screened at the Film Festivals of Venice, Cannes, Berlin, Montreal, Paris, Valladolid among many others over the past five years, including the much praised Kleine Fische (Little Fish). His critically acclaimed Rain Is Falling showed at the Film Festivals of Berlin and Venice (over 200 Festivals since its premiere, winning more than 40 Awards). It won the renowned Max-Ophuels-Award of the Saarbruecken Film Festival, the UIP Valladolid, the BAFTA/LA Award for Excellence and was nominated for the European Filmprize.

His short/commercial FACES [:phases] for Volkswagen earned him critical acclaim and prizes again among commercial- and film-festivals, winning the German Wirtschaftsfilmpreis, the Grand Prix in Bourges, in San Roque and the prestigious Friedrich-Wilhelm-Murnau Prize 2008. Planned on this short is a feature-length visual essay now in preparation.

Holger Ernst / HOLGERSON was awarded for his scripts on feature film projects: Das Leben geht weiter (Life Goes On), Familie–Demontage einer Seele (How to kill a soul), and Wir sind die Groessten.

His feature film The House is Burning (starring John Diehl and Academy Award winner Melissa Leo), produced by acclaimed director Wim Wenders, Peter Schwarzkopff (Reverse Angle International) and Academy Award winner Alex Gibney (Enron: The Smartest Guys in the Room, Taxi to the Dark Side) premiered at the 2006 Cannes Film Festival and marks his debut as feature film director.

== Filmography ==
- 1997–Argus
- 1998–Der blaue Engel oder die Angst der Martha S. / the blue angel or the fear of Martha S.
- 1999–Kleistronik
- 2000–Kleine Fische / Little Fish
- 2001–Liebst du mich? / Do you love me?
- 2003–Natur Pur
- 2004–Rain Is Falling
- 2006–The House is Burning
- 2007–Faces [:phases]

== Screenplays (Feature) ==
- Life goes on
- Family - How to kill a soul
- Wir sind die Groessten
- The house is burning
- Cold War
- D.O.P.E.

== Awards ==
- 1998 Talent-Stipe Young German Cinema
- 2000 Hesse Filmprize 2000 (Life goes on) - Best Screenplay
- 2001 Selected by EXPORT UNION OF GERMAN CINEMA for their Program “Next Generation 2001” (Little Fish)
- 2001 Winner Best Short Film Award WFF Montreal (KLEINE FISCHE/Little Fish) (1/2)
- 2001 Golden Herkules 2001 (KLEINE FISCHE)
- 2001 Hesse Filmprize 2001 (KLEINE FISCHE)
- 2003 nominated for the German Filmprize 2003 (best unfilmed Screenplay): WIR SIND DIE GRÖSSTEN
- 2003 Winner of the Commercial Competition GOOD FILM FOOD (NATUR PUR)
- 2004 nominated for the German Filmprize 2004 (best unfilmed Screenplay): FAMILY - How to kill a soul
- 2004 Official Competition 61. Mostra Intern. Filmfestival Venice (RAIN IS FALLING)
- 2004 Winner "A l'Affiche du Monde", Paris (RAIN IS FALLING)
- 2004 Winner UIP-Prize Valladolid, Spain (RAIN IS FALLING) (nominated for European Filmprize 2005)
- 2004 Winner TSR-Prize, Geneva, Switzerland (RAIN IS FALLING)
- 2004 Winner "Opere Nuove" Prize, Bozen, Italy (RAIN IS FALLING)
- 2005 Winner “Max-Ophüls-Preis” Saarbrücken, Germany (RAIN IS FALLING)
- 2005 Special Mention AlpeAdriaCinema Trieste, Italy (RAIN IS FALLING)
- 2005 Winner Friedrich-Wilhelm-Murnau-Prize (RAIN IS FALLING)
- 2005 Winner Palmares San Roque (RAIN IS FALLING)
- 2005 Winner „Best Cinematography“ Aspen (RAIN IS FALLING)
- 2005 BAFTA/LA „Award for Excellence“ Aspen (RAIN IS FALLING)
- 2005 Winner Remi Bronze Award Worldfilmfest Houston (RAIN IS FALLING)
- 2005 Winner Argenkino Buenos Aires (RAIN IS FALLING)
- 2005 Special Mention Festroia Setubal (RAIN IS FALLING)
- 2005 Winner Award Francisco García de Paso, Huesca (RAIN IS FALLING)
- 2005 Special Mention of the Jury of the Youth, Huesca (RAIN IS FALLING)
- 2005 Winner One-World-Filmprize Cologne, Germany (RAIN IS FALLING)
- 2005 Winner Grand Prix Crested Butte Reel Filmfestival, USA (RAIN IS FALLING)
- 2006 Winner International Filmfestival Teheran, Iran (RAIN IS FALLING)
- 2006 Winner International Filmfestival FAJR, Iran (RAIN IS FALLING)
- 2006 Winner International Filmfestival EcoVision Palermo, Italy (RAIN IS FALLING)
- 2006 Winner MedWet Award International Filmfestival Athens, Greece (RAIN IS FALLING)
- 2006 Worldpremiere THE HOUSE IS BURNING in the Official Selection CANNES Intern. Filmfestival
- 2006 Winner Jury Award Intern. Filmfestival Seoul, South Korea (THE HOUSE IS BURNING)
- 2006 Winner Grand Prix YoungFilmFestival, Poland (THE HOUSE IS BURNING)
- 2007 Winner WetWest Filmfestival, New Zealand (RAIN IS FALLING)
- 2007 Winner Best Film International Cinemountain Cervino, Italy (RAIN IS FALLING)
- 2007 Winner Best Film International Filmfestival Hoboken, USA (THE HOUSE IS BURNING)
- 2007 Winner Best Film International Festival du Film Ecologique Bourges, France (FACES)
- 2007 Deutscher Wirtschaftsfilmpreis (FACES)
- 2008 Friedrich-Wilhelm-Murnau Preis (FACES)
- 2008 Grand Prix San Roque (FACES)
- 2008 Czech Radio Award One World Intern. Filmfestival (FACES)
