= Rings Around the World =

Album by Super Furry Animals

Studio album by Super Furry Animals
- Released: 23 July 2001
- Recorded: April–September 2000
- Studios: Monnow Valley (Rockfield, Monmouthshire); Bearsville (Woodstock, New York)
- Genres: Progressive rock; progressive pop; art rock; alternative rock; electronic
- Length: 52:47
- Label: Epic
- Producers: Chris Shaw and Super Furry Animals

Super Furry Animals chronology
Mwng (2000)	Rings Around the World (2001)	Phantom Power (2003)

Singles from Rings Around the World
- 1. "Juxtapozed with U" Released: 9 July 2001; 2. "(Drawing) Rings Around the World" Released: 8 October 2001; 3. "It's Not the End of the World?" Released: 14 January 2002

Rings Around the World is the fifth studio album and major label debut by Super Furry Animals. Released on 23 July 2001 by Epic Records in the United Kingdom, it was the first album by any artist to be simultaneously released on both audio CD and DVD. The record reached number 3 in the UK Albums Chart and includes the singles "Juxtapozed with U", "(Drawing) Rings Around the World" and "It's Not the End of the World?".

The album, which singer Gruff Rhys describes as "a very ambitious project", was recorded between April and September 2000 at Monnow Valley Studios in Rockfield, Monmouthshire, Wales and Bearsville Studios, New York with the band acting as co-producers alongside Chris Shaw. The majority of the songs on Rings Around the World were written by Rhys on guitar and piano with keyboardist Cian Ciaran contributing "[A] Touch Sensitive" and "Miniature" as well as collaborating with other members of the band on "Run! Christian, Run!", "Alternate Route to Vulcan Street" and "No Sympathy". Ex-Beatle Paul McCartney and former Velvet Underground member John Cale make cameo appearances on the album.

Musically Rings Around the World is an eclectic record incorporating pop, prog, punk, jungle, electronica, techno and death metal. Rhys has offered several explanations of the album's lyrical content, claiming the record is "about Earth, and the pollution of space" and also that it addresses the human condition. Critics meanwhile have referred to the record as "thematically eccentric" and lacking an "overarching theme". Critical reception was generally positive, with the album being nominated for 2001's Mercury Music Prize and placing at #1 in Mojo's "best albums of 2001" feature. Some reviews claimed it to be the best record of the band's career although the NME described it as the band's worst album.

== Origins and recording ==
Rings Around the World was the Super Furry Animals' first album for Epic Records following the demise, in 1999, of their previous label Creation and the success of 2000's Mwng, which was issued on the band's own label, Placid Casual. Singer Gruff Rhys has stated that the band aimed to make a "laid back and sort of wiped clean" record with Rings.... In a 2008 interview with Uncut Rhys described the album as "a very ambitious project" stating that "We were trying to make a blockbuster album that was going to be like The Eagles ... We were trying to make utopian pop music that had pretensions of being progressive and exciting." Rings... was originally going to be called Text Messaging is Destroying the Pub Quiz as We Know It (Note: Although many publications have suggested that Rings... was originally going to be called Text Messaging is Destroying the Pub Quiz as We Know It this may not have been the case. According to the BBC the phrase was written on an "ideas wall" in the studio during recording sessions and was spotted by an NME journalist who simply assumed it was going to be the album's title.) and released as a double album containing 75–90 minutes of material with Rhys stating that he was "into the excess of it, that was the whole point". The group eventually decided against the idea but, drawn by the technical capabilities of the format and the desire to do something that had never been done before, produced a DVD version of Rings..., making it the first album to be simultaneously released on CD and DVD. The DVD features a surround sound mix alongside music videos and remixes and was made possible only by the financial backing of Epic.

Recording sessions began in April 2000 at Monnow Valley Studios in Rockfield, Monmouthshire, Wales with co-producer Chris Shaw and engineer Eric Tew. The band moved to Bearsville Studios, New York before returning to Monnow Valley some months later where recording was completed in September 2000. Bearsville was chosen because of its drum and live rooms, which the band felt were desirable as they were using more microphones to capture audio for the surround sound mix included on the DVD version of the album than they would normally when simply recording in stereo. The group was mindful of the capabilities of surround sound and recorded sub-bass on tracks such as "[A] Touch Sensitive" and "Juxtapozed with U", which could only be heard through a low-frequency subwoofer channel in the surround mix. The band recorded onto two-inch analogue tape until they had a take they were happy with, then transferred the results to Pro Tools where individual songs were edited and overdubs were added. According to Keyboardist Cian Ciaran this meant the band could "edit some beats very precisely ... like the gated kicks at the end of the track "Sidewalk Serfer Girl"". Once they were happy with a song the group then transferred it back to tape before mixing took place as they liked the "tape sound".

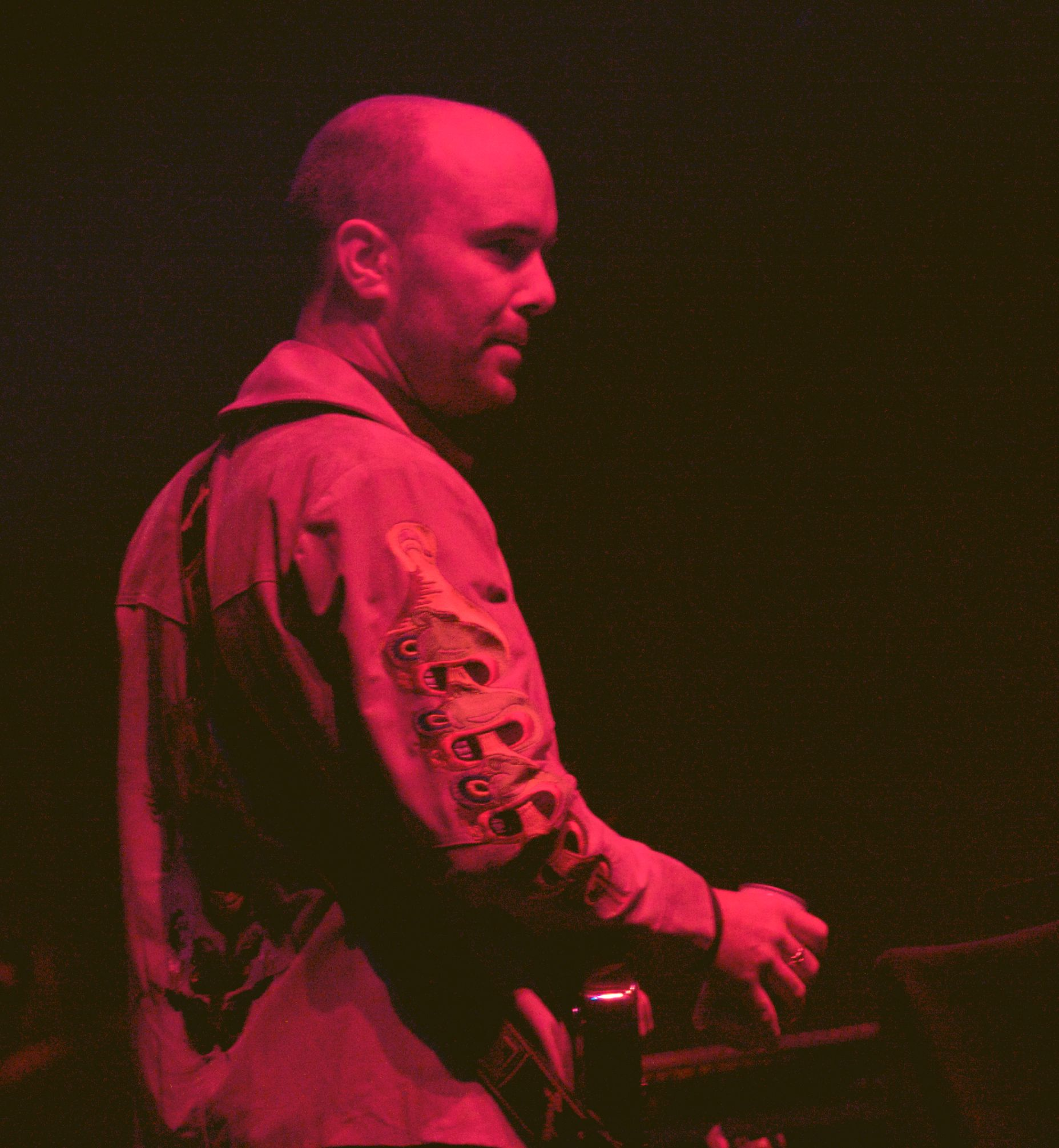
Keyboardist Cian Ciaran contributed two tracks to Rings Around the World and collaborated with other members of the band on several more.

Rhys wrote many of the tracks on the album on acoustic guitar and piano and brought them to the band either as fully formed songs or as ideas which the group would then jam out. Ciaran wrote the songs "[A] Touch Sensitive" and "Miniature" and the intro and outro of "Run! Christian, Run!". A jam between Cian and guitarist Huw Bunford resulted in Rings Around the World's opening track "Alternate Route to Vulcan Street". The pair looped a sample of drummer Dafydd Ieuan playing the bass drum and snare and recorded themselves playing along on piano and guitar into a sampler. They then "chopped the playing up a bit" and filtered the drums and guitar to "give them more movement". Finally Rhys wrote lyrics and a string arrangement was added by Sean O'Hagan. Cian also contributed to the second part of the song "No Sympathy", sampling the "mellow acoustic guitars" from the first half to create a techno "climactic ending".

Sessions for Rings Around the World saw the band concentrating on arrangements, particularly their vocal harmonies. On previous albums individual members of the group would "keep singing until [they] came up with harmonies that worked" but, encouraged by co-producer Chris Shaw, for Rings... the band took the time to work out harmonies in advance. The group used piano, keyboards or "whatever was available" to give themselves a starting note before the five band members and staff at the recording studio began trying ideas out. Occasionally Auto-Tune was used to "re-pitch existing lines to see if different versions of them would counterpoint correctly", with the band then learning the new vocal lines and recording them as they did not want to use Auto-Tune on the finished album.

Paul McCartney is credited as providing "celery and carrot" on the track "Receptacle for the Respectable". McCartney is alleged to have performed a similar role over thirty years earlier, chewing celery to form the percussion track of The Beach Boys song "Vegetables" from the album Smiley Smile. The Super Furry Animals had met the ex-Beatle at the NME Awards when a drunk Ciaran persuaded him to let them remix some Beatles material, resulting in 2000's Liverpool Sound Collage album. The band asked him to "return the favour" and appear on Rings Around the World, recording his part over the phone. Huw Bunford has said of McCartney's contribution: "He took it with good nature. You kind of see how far you can go sometimes ... we figured we already had a bass and singers so we really didn't need any more musicians. So we figured he could crunch vegetables". Former Velvet Underground member John Cale, a "sort of childhood hero" of Rhys's, also makes an appearance on the album, playing piano on the song "Presidential Suite". The Super Furry Animals had met Cale in Cardiff when they acted as his backing band for a song which appeared on the film Beautiful Mistake. They originally asked him to arrange strings for "Presidential Suite" but Cale turned them down reasoning that he would simply do what the band do: hum a melody to someone who could write the music down for him.

== Musical style ==
Super Furry Animals "Receptacle For the Respectable" (2001)
"Receptacle For the Respectable" is the one time the Super Furry Animals went with their "silly streak" on Rings Around the World. This clip shows the transition to the fourth and last section of the song, performed in a "pantomime death metal" style.

Super Furry Animals "No Sympathy" (2001)
Short clip from "No Sympathy", which merges Crosby, Stills, Nash & Young style harmonies with jungle hi-hats and techno.

Rings Around the World is "very cinematic" and falls somewhere between the Super Furry Animals' 1999 album, the "instantaneous, easy to grasp, and almost disposable" Guerrilla, and its "exact opposite", 2000's Mwng. The band combined the technology they used for the former with the simplicity of the latter, which featured "just the band playing in the studio". Singer Gruff Rhys has described the album as the band's "cosmic rock record".

The album is a "kaleidoscopic blend of pop, prog, punk, psych, and electronica". Drowned in Sound describes it as similar to Guerrilla with "Beach Boys-esque psychedelic pop ... put to techno undertones" while the NME has called Rings Around the World an "expensive, glossy production ... lush and widescreen" and suggested that it "reaches for an effect so modern that at times it sounds like it could've been made in the '80s". The first single, "Juxtapozed with U", is reminiscent of both the Philadelphia soul music of the 1970s, and the "plastic" approximation of that music on David Bowie's 1975 album Young Americans, while "No Sympathy" has been described as the "missing link between Crosby, Stills, Nash & Young-scatted harmonies, jungle hi-hats and berserk sampler techno". The Dallas Observer compared "It's Not the End of the World?" to tunes such as The Kinks' "Waterloo Sunset", Dennis Wilson's "Forever" and Jack Bruce's "Theme for an Imaginary Western" while The Big Issue called "Sidewalk Serfer Girl" "surf-punk electro pop". Elsewhere on the album the eclectic range of sounds continues from the trip hop of "[A] Touch Sensitive" to the Status Quo-esque "(Drawing) Rings Around the World" and the "electro country rock" of "Run! Christian, Run!".

The track "Receptacle For the Respectable" reflects the eclecticism of the album as it "undergoes a complete personality change" over the course of its four-minute thirty-two-second duration, veering from prog rock to death metal. The song begins as an acoustic guitar-driven pop song and then shifts into a slower bridge section which leads to an even slower coda which has been compared to the music of Burt Bacharach and The Beach Boys' Smiley Smile album and features Paul McCartney chewing carrots and celery to the beat. The track ends with a "pantomime death metal" section with Rhys's "distorted, bellowed vocals" screaming the title phrase. According to Cian Ciaran, the song initially comprised just the first two parts when recorded at Monnow Valley Studios but, by the time the group relocated to Bearsville Studios, Rhys had written and added the third section. While there the band added the fourth section by "pissing about with Pro Tools", looping the bass from the end of the third section "by accident" to create the musical backing. A fifth, hip hop, section was discussed but the band decided against it, reasoning that "if you're going to do a fifth bit, you'd probably do a sixth, and before you know where you are, you're doing a concept album made up of nothing but bits!". According to the band, the track is the only time on the album where they tried to achieve comedy and "completely went with [their] silly streak".

== Lyrical themes ==
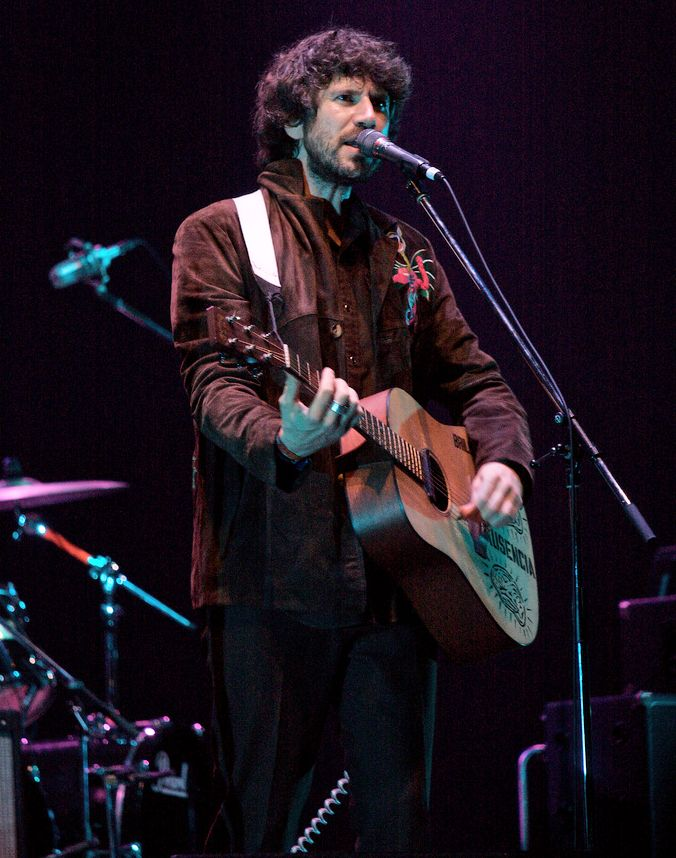
Chief lyricist Gruff Rhys has described the songs on Rings Around the World as "broodier and more revealing" than those on 1999's Guerrilla.

Singer and chief lyric writer Gruff Rhys has given several explanations of the lyrical themes present on the album. He has claimed that the record is "about Earth, and the pollution of space: it's about debris" and that it was originally going to be a "state of the planet concept album" before the band decided against it. Rhys has also stated that the album is about the human condition, citing tracks such as "Fragile Happiness" and "Receptacle For The Respectable" as examples. Critics have referred to the album as "thematically eccentric" and lacking an "overarching theme" with The Independent claiming it leaps "from religious fundamentalists to modern telecommunications and the old Hollywood star system with disorienting glee".

In contrast with 1999's Guerrilla, which featured songs with "self-consciously disposable, happy" lyrics, the tracks on Rings Around the World are, according to Rhys, "broodier and more revealing". The track "No Sympathy" was originally written for a film entitled Plop, which followed three unsympathetic characters who lived for a week as though it were their last. Rhys has described the song as quite a departure for him as a lyric writer and claimed that out of context it could appear bleak and scary. "Presidential Suite", about former United States and Russian presidents Bill Clinton and Boris Yeltsin, is "a reflective look back at the decadent nineties" during the Lewinsky scandal and asks if "we need to know if he really came inside her mouth?". "Juxtapozed with U" addresses social injustice and is about "house prices going up, and people being left behind by the super rich" and has been described by Rhys as "grotesque in its upness and lift". "Sidewalk Serfer Girl" was initially written about Patti White Bull, a girl who fell into a coma for 15 years, awaking in 1999, but became an amalgamation of the lyrics of several different songs, including one section in which Rhys describes his disdain for extreme sports. "Receptacle for the Respectable" is about simultaneously being in awe of, and being hurt by, a "girl around town" while "It's Not the End of the World?" is "a romantic song about growing old". "Run! Christian, Run!" was influenced by guitarist Huw Bunford's interest in "doomsday cult websites". Bunford printed out several essays from these websites and gave them to Rhys who used them as inspiration for his lyrics along with his own recollections of watching Christian television shows during the band's American tours. The album's title track, "(Drawing) Rings Around the World", is based on an idea put forward by Rhys' girlfriend's father and is about "all the rings of communication around the world. All the rings of pollution, and all the radioactivity that goes around". "Shoot Doris Day" refers to shooting American singer and actress Doris Day with film—"a very cinematic reference" for a song which Rhys claims is "over-the-top lyrically". The track is about "how people change" and also references Labour Party 'spin doctor' Peter Mandelson, in the guise of 'Victor Panache'.

== DVD ==
Rings Around the World

Video by Super Furry Animals
- Released: 23 July 2001
- Genres: Progressive rock; progressive pop; art rock; alternative rock; electronic
- Label: Epic

Super Furry Animals chronology
Rings Around the World (2001)	Phantom Power (2003)

The DVD of Rings Around the World contains the 13 songs featured on the album, along with 5 bonus tracks. These 18 songs are presented in surround sound and are accompanied by "low budget" music videos. The release also includes 16 remixes and interactive menus featuring ambient music created by the band. According to keyboard player Cian Ciaran the group were worried that "doing a DVD might seem elitist, because only certain people have DVD players and systems, even now" but reasoned that "most people will have DVD playback systems at home within five years. Even if it doesn't take off, the stereo version of the album will always be there". The DVD release received a '15' certificate from the British Board of Film Classification, meaning that no-one under the age of 15 could buy or rent it in the United Kingdom.

Ciaran has stated that the Super Furry Animals were "very hands-on" during the making of the DVD. Initially the band were mainly concerned with the sound quality, describing the presentation of the album's tracks in surround sound as "radical, like the change from mono to stereo". The group directed the surround sound mix themselves, instructing audio engineers to move instruments and vocal parts between speakers: "We want that one bit of sound to travel from the centre, over our heads and finish on my right shoulder ... Let's have the main vocal in the middle, then each harmony in its own speaker." They soon became equally as interested in the remixes, visuals and interactive elements however. Ciaran has described this process as "not always a nice position to be in" when, for example, they had to reject music videos they weren't happy with. The band asked different directors to make music videos for each song having tried unsuccessfully to make a film to accompany their 1999 album Guerrilla themselves. According to singer Gruff Rhys the band "tended to go for illustrators who could [make videos] cheaply using Flash ... and artists who like to work". The directors were asked to make the visuals as "extreme as possible" in an effort to avoid making videos that looked like just "another pop promo ... like MTV" and, according to Ciaran, had to "work even harder at creating something interesting" due to the limited budget available. Many of those who made videos for the DVD release had no previous experience of making films resulting in a "really fresh ... kind of scruffy" end product. According to Rhys the band made separate music videos for Rings Around the World's three singles as they saw the videos included on the DVD release of the album as "pure art" whereas they needed promotional videos that were more like adverts for the songs. Rhys has stated that the Super Furry Animals felt that fans placed too much emphasis on the videos on Rings Around the World rather than concentrating on the music, as a result of which the band used "really bland images" on the DVD release of their next album Phantom Power.

Although he enjoyed having so much control over the project Ciaran has claimed that it "sometimes felt like it would never end" and he was glad to get back to "the music side of things" upon the DVD's completion. Singer Gruff Rhys has stated that he found being involved with all aspects of the DVD release "really exciting" and particularly enjoyed working with "so many people".

== Release ==
Rings Around the World was released on CD, vinyl, MiniDisc and DVD on 23 July 2001 in the United Kingdom on Sony's Epic imprint and was the world's first simultaneous album/DVD release. The record reached number 3 in the UK Albums Chart. In America Rings Around the World was released on 19 March 2002 by XL Recordings with a bonus CD featuring seven tracks which appear on the DVD version of the album. Rings Around the World was released on 25 September 2001 in Japan with two additional tracks, "Tradewinds" and "Happiness Is a Worn Pun", added after "Fragile Happiness" at the end of the album. "Juxtapozed with U" was released as the first single from the album, reaching number 14 in the UK Singles Chart, followed by "(Drawing) Rings Around the World" in October 2001 which peaked at number 28. The third and final single to be taken from the album, "It's Not the End of the World?", was released in January 2002 and reached number 30 in the UK Singles Chart. The album has been certified gold in the United Kingdom, denoting sales of more than 100,000 copies.

Region	Date	Label	Format	Catalogue
Japan	25 September 2001	Epic Japan	Compact disc	ESCA-8341
United Kingdom	23 July 2001	Epic	Compact disc	5024132
United Kingdom	23 July 2001	Epic	Minidisc	5024130
United Kingdom	23 July 2001	Epic	DVD	201457 9
United Kingdom	23 July 2001	Epic	Vinyl record	5024139
United States	19 March 2002	XL Recordings/Beggars Banquet US	Compact disc	BXL 026 CD

== Critical reception ==
Professional ratings
Aggregate scores
Source	Rating
Metacritic	86/100
Review scores
Source	Rating
AllMusic	4/5 stars
Entertainment Weekly	A−
The Guardian	4/5 stars
Los Angeles Times	3.5/4 stars
NME	6/10
Pitchfork	8.9/10
Q	3/5 stars
Rolling Stone	4/5 stars
The Rolling Stone Album Guide	5/5 stars
Spin	9/10

Rings Around the World received praise from critics with a score of 86 on Metacritic, denoting "universal acclaim". Brent DiCrescenzo of Pitchfork stated that the album's combination of "paisley, sun-heated, and layered" music with Gruff Rhys's "satirical and heartfelt lyrics" makes it "timeless" and the band's best record. Adrian Begrand of PopMatters called the record "near-perfect" and wrote that "we should be thankful there are bands out there willing to throw everything they've got into a record just to see what happens". Uncut praised its "accessible and adventurous" nature, while The Independent opined that Rings Around the World "represents a quantum jump beyond the Furries' previous work" and described it as "one of the year's most engrossing – and, crucially, most entertaining – albums". Mojo stated that Rings Around the World was the band's "first truly flawless album" and later named it the best album of 2001. Tiny Mix Tapes called Rings Around the World "one of the, if not the, best releases of 2002", describing it as a "mixture of sugar pop of yesteryear and modern Britpop" resulting in a "near perfect" album. Rings Around the World was later nominated for 2001's Mercury Music Prize.

In a review for Stylus Magazine, Scott Plagenhoef wrote that on Rings Around the World, the band are "gleefully working outside of a scene or prototype" and "dabbling in a world of musical influences and Western hegemony, playing the merry prankster to Radiohead's gloom – and all with a smile, and in three-part harmony". Writing for AllMusic, Stephen Thomas Erlewine praised the record, claiming that it "shines brightly" compared to the "dead world of mainstream and indie rock in 2001" but expressed disappointment that it is "the first SFA album not to progress from its predecessor". Rob Brunner of Entertainment Weekly claimed that at its best, the album "recalls a lost Brian Wilson-style psychedelic marvel", but went on to state that it is "at times marred by forced eccentricity", citing the "heavy metal gorgon voice booming through 'Receptacle for the Respectable'" and the "awful lite-rock homage" "Juxtapozed with U" as examples. Q stated that, although songs such as "(Drawing) Rings Around the World", "Shoot Doris Day" and "Presidential Suite" are "excellent", the album features "nothing to change anyone's world", while the NME claimed that, despite containing some great songs, it is the band's worst album. Robert Christgau of The Village Voice singled out "Tradewinds" as a "choice cut", indicating a "good song on an album that isn't worth your time or money."

Accolades

Publication	Country	Accolade	Rank	Year
Eye Weekly	Canada	Albums of the year 2001	10	2001
Les Inrockuptibles	France	2001 Critics Albums	37	2001
Iguana Music	Spain	Best albums 2001	6	2001
Mondo Sonoro	Spain	Best records 2001	9	2001
Rock De Luxe	Spain	Best records 2001	22	2001
Mercury Music Prize	United Kingdom	2001 shortlist	*	2001
Mojo	United Kingdom	Mojo albums of 2001	1	2001
NME	United Kingdom	Albums of 2001	11	2001
NME	United Kingdom	100 Greatest Albums of the Decade	29	2009
Q	United Kingdom	End of year lists	*	2001
Record Collector	United Kingdom	Best of 2001: New albums	*	2001
1001 Albums You Must Hear Before You Die	United States	1001 Albums You Must Hear Before You Die	*	2006
Spin	United States	The 40 Best Albums of 2002	38	2002
The Village Voice	United States	Pazz & Jop Albums of 2001	126	2001
The Village Voice	United States	Pazz & Jop Albums of 2002	29	2002

* denotes an unordered list

== Track listing ==
=== Original 2001 Editions ===
All tracks are written by Super Furry Animals, except "[A] Touch Sensitive" which contains a sample of "Ann" by Dave Alexander, Ron Asheton, Scott Asheton and Iggy Pop.

Standard edition
No.	Title	Length
1.	"Alternate Route to Vulcan Street"	4:31
2.	"Sidewalk Serfer Girl"	4:01
3.	"(Drawing) Rings Around the World"	3:29
4.	"It's Not the End of the World?"	3:25
5.	"Receptacle for the Respectable"	4:32
6.	"[A] Touch Sensitive"	3:07
7.	"Shoot Doris Day"	3:38
8.	"Miniature"	0:40
9.	"No Sympathy"	6:57
10.	"Juxtapozed with U"	3:08
11.	"Presidential Suite"	5:24
12.	"Run! Christian, Run!"	7:20
13.	"Fragile Happiness"	2:35
Total length:		52:47

UK first edition vinyl bonus 7"
No.	Title	Length
1.	"All the Shit U Do" (instrumental locked groove)	approx. 0:04
Total length:		approx. 0:04

US bonus disc
No.	Title	Length
1.	"Tradewinds"	5:13
2.	"The Roman Road"	5:18
3.	"Patience"	4:04
4.	"Happiness Is a Worn Pun"	3:16
5.	"Gýpsy Space Muffin"	3:30
6.	"Edam Anchorman"	3:22
7.	"All the Shit U Do"	2:32
Total length:		27:15

DVD video tracklisting
No.	Title	Length
1.	"Alternate Route to Vulcan Street"	4:31
2.	"Sidewalk Serfer Girl"	4:01
3.	"(Drawing) Rings Around the World"	3:29
4.	"It's Not the End of the World?"	3:25
5.	"Receptacle for the Respectable"	4:32
6.	"[A] Touch Sensitive"	3:07
7.	"Shoot Doris Day"	3:38
8.	"Miniature"	0:40
9.	"No Sympathy"	6:57
10.	"Juxtapozed with U"	3:08
11.	"Presidential Suite"	5:24
12.	"Run! Christian, Run!"	7:20
13.	"Fragile Happiness"	2:35
14.	"The Roman Road"	5:18
15.	"Tradewinds"	5:13
16.	"Happiness Is a Worn Pun"	6:14
17.	"Patience"	4:03
18.	"All the Shit U Do"	2:29
Total length:		76:14

DVD audio tracklisting
No.	Title	Length
1.	"Alternate Route to Vulcan Street (Bench Remix)"	7:05
2.	"(Drawing) Rings Around the World (Llwybr Llaethog Remix)"	3:33
3.	"It's Not the End of the World? (Force Unknown Remix)"	3:52
4.	"[A] Touch Sensitive (Force Unknown Remix 1)"	6:23
5.	"Shoot Doris Day (Wauvenfold Remix)"	4:06
6.	"Miniature (Goem Remix)"	0:43
7.	"No Sympathy (Kid606 Remix)"	4:47
8.	"Juxtapozed with U (Super Furry Animals Remix)"	3:23
9.	"Presidential Suite (The High Llamas Remix)"	4:18
10.	"Run! Christian, Run! (Massimo Remix)"	7:18
11.	"Fragile Happiness (Brave Captain Remix)"	4:01
12.	"Alternate Route to Vulcan Street (Atmos Remix)"	4:42
13.	"Presidential Suite (Phat Eric Remix)"	5:16
14.	"Fragile Happiness (Pieweighter Remix)"	4:06
15.	"Juxtapozed with U (Lesser Remix)"	3:22
16.	"[A] Touch Sensitive (Force Unknown Remix 2)"	7:54
Total length:		74:34

=== Deluxe 20th Anniversary Editions ===
CD, Disc 1
No.	Title	Length
1.	"Alternate Route to Vulcan Street"	4:31
2.	"Sidewalk Serfer Girl"	4:01
3.	"(Drawing) Rings Around the World"	3:29
4.	"It's Not the End of the World?"	3:25
5.	"Receptacle for the Respectable"	4:32
6.	"[A] Touch Sensitive"	3:07
7.	"Shoot Doris Day"	3:38
8.	"Miniature"	0:40
9.	"No Sympathy"	6:57
10.	"Juxtapozed with U"	3:08
11.	"Presidential Suite"	5:24
12.	"Run! Christian, Run!"	7:20
13.	"Fragile Happiness" (ends with hidden track "Receptacle For The Respectable (Maccapella Celery)")	3:35
14.	"Tradewinds"	5:13
15.	"The Roman Road"	5:18
16.	"Happiness Is a Worn Pun"	3:21
17.	"Patience"	4:04
18.	"Edam Anchorman"	3:22
19.	"All the Shit U Do"	2:30
Total length:		77:35

CD, Disc 2: A Little Pit Stop On The Road To Rome
No.	Title	Length
1.	"Gýpsy Space Muffin"	3:30
2.	"John Spex (Outtake)"	5:13
3.	"Miami Vice (Outtake)"	10:00
4.	"Sanitised (Rough Mix)"	2:58
5.	"Chihuahua (Unfinished, Rough Mix)" (ends with hidden track "(Drawing) Rings Around The World (Acapella Phones)")	6:48
6.	"(Drawing) Rings Around The World #1 (Demo)"	0:34
7.	"(Drawing) Rings Around The World #2 (Demo)"	1:49
8.	"(Drawing) Rings Around The World #3 (Demo)"	1:59
9.	"No Sympathy (Demo)"	4:01
10.	"Tradewinds (Demo)"	3:44
11.	"Receptacle For The Respectable #1 (Demo)"	2:17
12.	"Receptacle For The Respectable #2 (Demo)"	2:20
13.	"Happiness Is A Worn Pun (Demo)"	2:39
14.	"Sidewalk Serfer Girl (Demo)"	0:23
15.	"Presidential Suite (Demo)"	2:53
16.	"The Roman Road (Demo)"	4:24
17.	"Patience #2 (Demo)"	4:23
18.	"Shoot Doris Day (Demo)"	3:45
19.	"Edam Anchorman (Demo)"	2:55
20.	"Sanitised (Demo)"	2:13
21.	"Fragile Happiness (Demo)" (ends with hidden track "Tape Rewind")	3:47
22.	"Tradewinds (Acoustic Mix) / Sidewalk Serfer Girl (Unused ’70s Rock Edit Section) / Shoot Doris Day (Excised Third Chorus) / Sidewalk Serfer Girl (Alternate Second Verse)" (unlisted hidden track)	6:33
Total length:		79:08

CD, Disc 3: Every Building Has Been Built
No.	Title	Length
1.	"Alternate Route to Vulcan Street (Bench Remix)"	6:56
2.	"Sidewalk Serfer Girl (Catatonia Remix)"	1:54
3.	"(Drawing) Rings Around The World (Happy Chapel Remix)"	3:31
4.	"It's Not the End Of The World? (Force Unknown Remix)"	3:50
5.	"Receptacle For The Respectable (Destructable Mix)"	2:09
6.	"[A] Touch Sensitive (Force Unknown Remix)"	7:47
7.	"Shoot Doris Day (Wauvenfold Remix)"	4:06
8.	"Miniature (Goem Remix)"	0:43
9.	"No Sympathy (Kid606 Remix)"	4:47
10.	"Juxtapozed with U (Super Furry Animals Remix)"	3:23
11.	"Presidential Suite (The High Llamas Remix)"	4:18
12.	"Run! Christian, Run! (Massimo Remix)"	7:18
13.	"Fragile Happiness (Brave Captain Remix)"	4:01
14.	"DVD Menu Music Medley" (unlisted hidden track)	25:12
Total length:		79:55

Web Part 1, Disc 1
No.	Title	Length
1.	"Alternate Route to Vulcan Street"	4:31
2.	"Sidewalk Serfer Girl"	4:01
3.	"(Drawing) Rings Around the World"	3:29
4.	"It's Not the End of the World?"	3:25
5.	"Receptacle for the Respectable"	4:32
6.	"[A] Touch Sensitive"	3:07
7.	"Shoot Doris Day"	3:38
8.	"Miniature"	0:40
9.	"No Sympathy"	6:57
10.	"Juxtapozed with U"	3:08
11.	"Presidential Suite"	5:24
12.	"Run! Christian, Run!"	7:20
13.	"Fragile Happiness"	2:35
Total length:		52:47

Web Part 1, Disc 2
No.	Title	Length
1.	"Tradewinds"	5:13
2.	"The Roman Road"	5:18
3.	"Patience"	4:04
4.	"Edam Anchorman"	3:22
5.	"All the Shit U Do"	2:30
6.	"Gýpsy Space Muffin"	3:30
7.	"Happiness Is a Worn Pun"	3:21
8.	"John Spex (Outtake)"	5:13
9.	"Miami Vice (Outtake)"	10:00
10.	"Sanitised (Rough Mix)"	2:58
11.	"Chihuahua (Unfinished, Rough Mix)"	4:51
Total length:		49:50

Web Part 1, Disc 3
No.	Title	Length
1.	"Alternate Route to Vulcan Street (Bench Remix)"	7:05
2.	"Alternate Route to Vulcan Street (Atmos Remix)"	4:43
3.	"Alternate Route to Vulcan Street (Will Wells Remix)"	4:24
4.	"Sidewalk Serfer Girl (Catatonia Remix)"	4:02
5.	"Sidewalk Serfer Girl (Catatonia Remix 2)"	6:33
6.	"(Drawing) Rings Around The World (Happy Chapel Remix)"	3:35
7.	"(Drawing) Rings Around The World (Hunan Laddiad Remix)"	3:42
8.	"(Drawing) Rings Around the World (Llwybr Llaethog Remix)"	3:33
9.	"It's Not the End of the World? (Force Unknown Remix)"	3:56
10.	"It's Not the End of the World? (Force Unknown D&B Remix)"	4:46
11.	"Receptacle For The Respectable (Llwybr Llaethog Remix)"	3:02
12.	"Receptacle For The Respectable (Destructable Mix)"	3:28
13.	"[A] Touch Sensitive (Force Unknown Remix)"	7:54
14.	"[A] Touch Sensitive (Force Unknown Remake)"	6:23
15.	"Shoot Doris Day (Wauvenfold Remix)"	4:06
16.	"Miniature (Goem Remix)"	0:43
17.	"No Sympathy (Kid606 Remix)"	4:47
18.	"Juxtapozed with U (Super Furry Animals Remix)"	3:25
19.	"Juxtapozed with U (Lesser Remix)"	3:23
20.	"Juxtapozed with U (Walt Liquor Mystic Remix)"	4:11
21.	"Presidential Suite (The High Llamas Remix)"	4:18
22.	"Presidential Suite (Phat Eric Remix)"	5:16
23.	"Run! Christian, Run! (Massimo Remix)"	7:18
24.	"Fragile Happiness (Pieweighter Remix)"	4:07
25.	"Fragile Happiness (Brave Captain Remix)"	4:05
26.	"Tradewinds (Bench Remix)"	3:31
Total length:		116:16

Web Part 2, Disc 1
No.	Title	Length
1.	"(Drawing) Rings Around The World #1 (Demo)"	2:05
2.	"(Drawing) Rings Around The World #2 (Demo)"	1:53
3.	"(Drawing) Rings Around The World #3 (Demo)"	2:03
4.	"No Sympathy (Demo)"	4:03
5.	"Tradewinds (Demo)"	3:44
6.	"Receptacle For The Respectable #1 (Demo)"	2:16
7.	"Receptacle For The Respectable #2 (Demo)"	2:20
8.	"Happiness Is A Worn Pun (Demo)"	2:39
9.	"Sidewalk Serfer Girl (Demo)"	0:23
10.	"Run! Christian, Run! (Demo)"	4:08
11.	"Presidential Suite (Demo)"	2:53
12.	"The Roman Road (Demo)"	4:24
13.	"Patience #1 (Demo)"	4:21
14.	"Patience #2 (Demo)"	4:23
15.	"Shoot Doris Day (Demo)"	3:44
16.	"Edam Anchorman (Demo)"	2:55
17.	"Sanitised (Demo)"	2:13
18.	"Fragile Happiness (Demo)"	2:34
Total length:		53:01

Web Part 2, Disc 2
No.	Title	Length
1.	"DVD Menu Music Medley"	25:12
2.	"(Drawing) Rings Around The World (Acapella Phones)"	2:00
3.	"Receptacle For The Respectable (Maccapella Celery)"	1:00
4.	"Tradewinds (Acoustic Mix)"	4:15
5.	"Sidewalk Serfer Girl (Alternate Second Verse)"	0:42
6.	"Shoot Doris Day (Excised Third Chorus)"	0:53
7.	"Sidewalk Serfer Girl (Unused '70s Rock Edit Section)"
22.	Untitled	0:40
Total length:		34:42

Web Part 2, Disc 3
No.	Title	Length
1.	"Alternate Route to Vulcan Street (Instrumental)"	4:42
2.	"Sidewalk Serfer Girl (Instrumental)"	4:06
3.	"(Drawing) Rings Around the World (Instrumental)"	3:35
4.	"It's Not the End of the World? (Instrumental)"	3:30
5.	"Receptacle for the Respectable (Instrumental)"	4:34
6.	"[A] Touch Sensitive (Alternate Mix)"	2:44
7.	"Shoot Doris Day (Instrumental)"	4:06
8.	"No Sympathy (Instrumental)"	5:06
9.	"No Sympathy, Part 2 (Alternate Mix)"	2:32
10.	"Juxtapozed with U (Instrumental)"	3:10
11.	"Presidential Suite (Instrumental)"	5:24
12.	"Run! Christian, Run! (Instrumental)"	7:17
13.	"Fragile Happiness"	2:35
14.	"Tradewinds (Instrumental)"	5:16
15.	"The Roman Road (Instrumental)"	6:03
16.	"Patience (Instrumental)"	4:05
17.	"Edam Anchorman (Instrumental)"	3:31
18.	"All the Shit U Do (Instrumental)"	2:31
19.	"Gýpsy Space Muffin (Instrumental)"	3:40
20.	"Happiness Is a Worn Pun (Instrumental)"	6:11
Total length:		84:38

== Personnel ==
All track numbers refer to the CD version of Rings Around the World unless otherwise stated.

Band

- Gruff Rhys – lead vocals, rhythm guitar, keyboards, harmonica
- Huw Bunford – lead guitar, keyboards, backing vocals, pedal steel
- Guto Pryce – bass guitar
- Cian Ciaran – keyboards, backing vocals
- Dafydd Ieuan – drums, backing vocals, co-lead vocals on "Receptacle for the Respectable"

Additional musicians

- Howard Gott – violin on tracks 1, 6, 11
- Harriet Harris – violin on tracks 4, 7, 10
- Sally Herbert – violin on tracks 4, 7, 10
- Steven Hussey – violin on track 6
- Jackie Norrie – violin on tracks 1, 4, 7, 10, 11
- Sonia Slany – violin on tracks 4, 7, 10
- Lucy Theo – violin on track 6
- Brian Wright – violin on tracks 1, 6, 11
- Nick Barr – viola on tracks 4, 7, 10
- Sophia Sirota – viola on tracks 1, 11
- Clare Smith – viola on tracks 4, 7, 10
- Nick Cooper – cello on tracks 4, 7, 10
- Sophie Harris – cello on tracks 4, 7, 10
- Matt Sibley – saxophone on tracks 5, 7, 11
- Gary Alesbrook – trumpet on tracks 5, 7, 11
- Tony Robinson – trumpet, flugel horn and trombone on tracks 5, 7, 11
- Beti Rhys – harp on tracks 10, 11
- John Telfer – flute on track 10
- John Cale – additional piano on track 11
- Osian Gwynedd – additional piano on track 1
- Kris Jenkins – percussion on tracks 9, 10, 11
- Anna Smith – backing vocals on track 1
- Paul McCartney – carrot and celery on track 5

Music video directors (DVD)

- 4k – track 11
- Spencer Bewley – track 17
- Co-Lab – track 2
- Concerko – track 2
- D.O.N.A. – track 10
- Pete Fowler – track 5
- Armand Geddyn – track 12
- Barbie Geddyn – track 12
- Peter Gray – track 7
- Johnny Hardstaff – track 14
- Sean Hillen – track 3
- Jake & Jim – track 16
- Mark James – track 15
- Dylan Jones – tracks 4, 8
- Mike "Spike" Jonez – track 20
- Lazy Eye – track 17
- Martin McCartney – track 13
- Neil McFarland – track 6
- Simon Pike – tracks 2, 5
- John Shahnazarian – track 9
- Darren Watkins – track 1

Remixers (DVD)

- Atmos – track 32
- Bench – track 21
- bravecaptain – track 31
- Force Unknown – tracks 23, 24, 36
- Goem – track 26
- The High Llamas – track 29
- Kid606 – track 27
- Lesser – track 35
- Llwybr Llaethog – track 22
- Massimo – track 30
- Pieweighter – track 34
- Phat Eric – track 34
- Super Furry Animals – track 28
- Wauvenfold – track 25

Recording personnel

- Super Furry Animals – production, string arrangements on tracks 1, 4, 7, 10, 11
- Sean O'Hagan – string arrangements on tracks 1, 11
- Marcus Holdaway – string arrangements on track 1, 11
- Sonia Slany – string arrangements on tracks 4, 7, 10
- Chris Shaw – production and engineering
- Eric Tew – engineering
- Damian Shannon – engineering assistant (Bearsville Studios)
- Richard Wilkinson – engineering assistant (Metropolis)
- Stuart Hawkes – mastering
- Julian Lowe – mastering

DVD production

- Mike Gillespie – production
- Super Furry Animals – executive production, DVD sound effects and music
- Anthony I.P. Owen – DVD authoring
- Coffeecup New Media – DVD interface design
- No Brake Visual Engineering – DVD interface design
- John Mark James – DVD interface icon design
- Robert Burnett – video encoding
- Crispin Murray – audio encoding
- Mike Jones – film compilation

Artwork

- Pete Fowler – illustration
- Simon Pike – illustration
- John Mark James – logos and fonts

== Album chart positions ==
Chart	Peak position
UK Albums Chart	3
U.S. Independent Albums	32
