= Juxtapozed with U =

2001 single by Super Furry Animals

Single by Super Furry Animals

from the album Rings Around the World
- Released: 9 July 2001
- Recorded: Monnow Valley Studio, Rockfield, Monmouthshire, 2000
- Genre: Alternative rock, soul
- Length: 3:08
- Label: Epic
- Songwriter: Super Furry Animals
- Producers: Super Furry Animals and Chris Shaw

Super Furry Animals singles chronology
"Ysbeidiau Heulog" (2000)	"Juxtapozed with U" (2001)	"(Drawing) Rings Around the World" (2001)

"Juxtapozed with U" is the thirteenth single by Super Furry Animals. It was the first single to be taken from the Rings Around the World album and reached number 14 on the UK Singles Chart on its release in July 2001. The song was initially conceived as a duet but, after both Brian Harvey and Bobby Brown turned the band down, lead singer Gruff Rhys sang the entire track, using a vocoder on the verses to imitate another person. Musically "Juxtapozed with U" has echoes of Philadelphia soul and the "plastic soul" of David Bowie's album Young Americans and was inspired by the Paul McCartney and Stevie Wonder track "Ebony and Ivory". Rhys has claimed that he sees "Juxtapozed with U" as "fairly subversive" because its polished pop style was in stark contrast to the "macho" guitar music the band felt was prevalent in 2001.

Critical reaction to the track was generally positive with some reviewers describing it as the band's best single to date. A promotional music video was produced to accompany "Juxtapozed with U"'s release as a single. Directed by Dawn of the New Assembly/H5 the video features a computer generated woman and man seen as thermal images. The couple drive around New York City and attend a party on the top floor of a skyscraper which is enveloped in flames towards the end of the track. An alternative video, directed by Fukme 99, was included on the DVD version of Rings Around the World. This video features three people walking through the streets of Hammersmith, dressed in cardboard costumes as a camcorder, clapperboard and microphone. The characters meet up with a fourth person wearing a large cardboard head and arms and then dance with several other people dressed in cardboard outside a group of warehouse. The DVD version of Rings Around the World also includes two remixes of "(Drawing) Rings Around the World" by Lesser and the Super Furry Animals themselves.

== Themes and recording ==
"Juxtapozed with U" was inspired by the Paul McCartney and Stevie Wonder track "Ebony and Ivory" as well as the work of Marvin Gaye and Caetano Veloso. The track was originally conceived as a duet, with the band approaching both Brian Harvey from East 17, and Bobby Brown to sing alongside Gruff Rhys. Both turned the band down so Rhys sang the verses through a vocoder to imitate another person, something which he has described as a "very schizophrenic thing to do". Rhys has claimed his lyrics address social injustice and are about "house prices going up, and people being left behind by the super rich". The song has echoes of the Philadelphia soul music of the 1970s as well as David Bowie's "plastic" approximation of the sound on his 1975 album Young Americans. The group tried to make the song as "plastic" as possible: "if we'd tried to make it sound authentic, it would have been awful." According to Rhys the band were keen to challenge people's opinions of them with the track which is a "shocking song, because you can't shock with loud guitars any more" and, as a polished uplifting pop song, is "fairly subversive" when contrasted with the macho guitar music which the band felt was prevalent in 2001. The track was recorded in 2000 at Monnow Valley Studio, Rockfield, Monmouthshire and was produced by the Super Furry Animals and Chris Shaw.

== Musical structure ==
Super Furry Animals "Juxtapozed with U" (2001)
Short sample from "Juxtapozed with U" featuring the track's outro. The clip illustrates Gruff Rhys's use of a vocoder on the verse and the orchestration which plays during the track's chorus.

"Juxtapozed with U" is 3 minutes 8 seconds long and is in the key of A major. The track begins with a drum fill, featuring flanging, before a harp, strings, acoustic guitar and bass join at 2 seconds. An electric guitar joins at 13 seconds playing a melody line. The song breaks down at 25 seconds for the first verse with just bass, drums, acoustic guitar and occasional synthesizer accompanying Gruff Rhys's vocals which are fed through a vocoder. The first chorus begins at 47 seconds with the strings and harp re-entering while Rhys sings the words "You've got to tolerate all those people that you hate, I'm not in love with you but I won't hold that against you" twice without the use of a vocoder. The song breaks down again for the second verse after which the second chorus enters at 1 minute 33 seconds. The outro begins at 1 minute 58 seconds with Rhys singing "Let's get juxtaposed, juxtaposed, just suppose I'm juxtaposed with you" supported by harmony backing vocals. The rest of the band continue singing these words while Rhys begins singing the chorus lyrics, starting at 2 minutes 43 seconds. The track ends with Rhys singing the words "Let's get juxtaposed" backed only by harmony vocals.

=== Alternative versions ===
Two remixes of "Juxtapozed with U" are included on the DVD version of Rings Around the World. The first, by the Super Furry Animals themselves, is 3 minutes 23 seconds in length and largely follows the arrangement of the original with lengthy instrumental passages between each verse and chorus. Electronic drums and keyboards play alongside Gruff Rhys's vocals with barely any recognisable instrumentation from the version of the track which appears on Rings Around the World. The second remix by Lesser is 3 minutes 22 seconds long and begins with a short sample of Rhys singing the words "All the people that you hate" before breaking down to finger clicking and clapping. Rhys's vocals enter again, singing the title phrase, before samples of the original's string section and drums enter at 1 minute 11 seconds. The rest of the track continues with Rhys's vocals backed by disjointed drum and string samples, breaking down towards the end to just the lead vocals and a harp. The remix ends with Rhys singing the line "Til someone stole my name" a cappella.

== Critical response ==
"Juxtapozed with U" received a generally positive response from critics. Drowned in Sound described the track as the Super Furry Animals' best single to date and stated that "its one of those songs which you will undoubtedly find yourself singing along to it as if you've heard it a million times before, its that catchy" while Allmusic saw the track as an example of the band's "exceptional songwriting". The NME gave the song their "Single of the week" award on its release, calling it "a total surprise and an absolute delight", going on to claim that "Juxtapozed with U" is "genius" and shows the band "going pop with grace, style and total conviction." Both Pitchfork Media and the Dallas Observer likened the song to Philadelphia soul music and The Guardian described it as a "string-laden soul ballad with the sort of treated robot vocal Daft Punk are fond of". Uncut described the track as a "delirious soul pastiche" and suggested Rhys's lyrics make a "wry plea for understanding between races and classes" while PopMatters claimed the song is about gentrification. Entertainment Weekly was critical of "Juxtapozed with U", describing it as an "awful lite-rock homage" which resembles the theme tune to The Love Boat.

=== Accolades ===
Publication	Country	Accolade	Year	Rank
NME	United Kingdom	Singles of 2001	2001	14
Pitchfork Media	United States	The Top 500 Tracks of the 2000s	2009	346

== Music videos ==
=== Fukme 99 video ===
Three people dressed in cardboard costumes as a camcorder, microphone and clapperboard respectively, meet a fourth person with a large cardboard head and arms (seen here in the centre exiting the house) in the Fukme 99 video.

A Fukme 99 directed video was included on the DVD version of Rings Around the World on its release in July 2001.

The video begins with the phrase "Get real!" in pink letters and features three people, dressed in cardboard costumes as a camcorder, clapperboard and microphone respectively, wandering around the streets of Hammersmith. The camcorder is refused entry into a shop and is taunted by schoolchildren while the clapperboard is told to leave the scene of a film by one of the crew. The microphone is shown attempting to hand out flyers alongside a man dressed in a banana costume who is much more successful at getting people to take the leaflets from him. The camcorder, microphone and clapperboard then meet up in a car park before going to the house of a man with a large cardboard head and arms. The four walk towards some warehouses where they dance with several other people dressed in cardboard, including a mobile phone and camera, as well as the man dressed as a banana who appeared earlier in the video. Rhys has described this sequence as a "big dance routine with ... cardboard outsiders".

Keyboard player Cian Ciaran has stated that the band deliberately tried to avoid making videos that looked like just "another pop promo ... like MTV" for the DVD version of Rings Around the World and asked the directors to make the visuals as "extreme as possible". Ciaran claims the directors had to "work even harder at creating something interesting" due to the limited budget available.

=== Dawn of the New Assembly/H5 video ===
The promotional video for "Juxtapozed with U" features a woman and a man seen as thermal images. This screenshot shows the pair visiting a nightclub with mathematical symbols and currency signs on the walls.

A promotional video, directed by Dawn of the New Assembly/H5, was produced to accompany the release of "Juxtapozed with U" as a single. According to Gruff Rhys the band made separate videos for Rings Around the World's three singles as they saw the videos included on the DVD release of the album as "pure art" whereas they needed promotional music videos that were more like adverts for the songs.

The video is computer generated and begins with stylised shots of traffic moving across the Brooklyn Bridge, New York. The camera zooms in to show a man and women, who appear as thermal images, driving one of the cars. The man checks his watch and puts a CD in the car's stereo before the video switches to an outside shot of the vehicle driving through a tunnel and a busy street. Another street is shown with many neon signs, including one which says "Broadway" and another with features the legend "Juxtapozed with U, Super Furry Animals". The couple continue driving until they reach the Guggenheim Art Museum where they park beside a valet who opens the car's passenger door. The next shot shows the museum's interior exhibit which consists of a black and neon blue grids with various mathematical symbols and currency signs on the walls. The couple talk to one of the crowd in the club before leaving the building and walking past the valet to a lift which takes them to a party on the roof of a skyscraper. Shots of a swimming pool on the skyscraper's roof and the couple kissing are intercut with images of fire engines driving through the streets past the Chrysler Building. These fire engines arrive below the skyscraper where the party is taking place and several people, including the couple, look down on them from above. Firemen are shown fighting a blaze on several floors of the skyscraper and a helicopter is seen flying to rescue the partygoers. In the last few seconds of the video the skyscraper explodes and the helicopter crashes into the roof of the building. The Dawn of the New Assembly/H5 video appears on the DVD release of the band's greatest hits album Songbook: The Singles, Vol. 1 and the Enhanced CD version of the "Juxtapozed with U" single.

== Track listing ==
All songs by Super Furry Animals.

- Digipak Enhanced CD (6712242)
1. "Juxtapozed with U" – 3:10
2. "Tradewinds" – 5:41
3. "Happiness is a Worn Pun" – 3:21

"Juxtapozed with U (Video)" – 3:10

- 12" (6712246), MC (6712244)
1. "Juxtapozed with U" – 3:10
2. "Tradewinds" – 5:41
3. "Happiness is a Worn Pun" – 3:21

== Personnel ==
- Gruff Rhys – vocals
- Huw Bunford – guitar
- Guto Pryce – bass guitar
- Cian Ciaran – keyboards
- Dafydd Ieuan – drums
- Beti Rhys – harp
- John Telfer – flute
- Harriet Harris – violin
- S. Herbert – violin
- Jackie Norrie – violin
- Sonia Slany – violin, string arrangements
- Nick Barr – viola
- Clare Smith – viola
- Nick Cooper – cello
- Sophie Harris – cello
- Kris Jenkins – percussion

== Chart positions ==
Chart	Peak position
UK Singles Chart	14
