= Do You Party? =

Studio album by The Soft Pink Truth
- Released: February 17, 2003
- Genres: Electronic music Experimental techno Microhouse
- Label: Soundslike Records

The Soft Pink Truth chronology
Do You Party? (2003)	Do You Want New Wave or Do You Want the Soft Pink Truth? (2004)

Professional ratings
Review scores
Source	Rating
AllMusic	4.5/5 stars
Cokemachineglow	80%
Pitchfork	8.4/10
Stylus	C+
Tiny Mix Tapes	3.5/5 stars

Do You Party? is an album and single by The Soft Pink Truth, a side-project of Drew Daniel of Matmos. Both the album and single were released on Matthew Herbert's label Soundslike Records in 2003.

There is a quasi-duet between Blevin Blectum of Blectum from Blechdom and Drew Daniel on the song "Gender Studies".

The song "Make Up" is a cover of a Vanity 6 song. It is written by Prince.

== Track listing ==
All songs written by Drew Daniel except “Make Up” written by Prince.

1. "Everybody's Soft" – 4:25
2. "Gender Studies" – 5:10
3. "Promo Funk" – 4:22
4. "Make Up" – 3:23
5. "Coat Check" – 4:19
6. "Soft on Crime" – 4:59
7. "Satie (Grey Corduroy Suit)" – 5:05
8. "Soft Pink Missy" – 4:31
9. "Big Booty Bitches" – 4:31
10. "Over You (No Love)" – 7:55
11. "I Want to Thank You" – 2:21

== Personnel ==
Artist

- Drew Daniel

Vocals

- Blevin Blectum ("Make Up")

Extra Musicians

- Rex Ray - Desaccordee
- Martin C. Schmidt - Synthesizer

Technical staff

- Xopher Davidson - Mastering
