= Why Do the Heathen Rage? (album) =

2014 album

Studio album by The Soft Pink Truth
- Released: June 17, 2014
- Recorded: 2013
- Studio: Baltimore
- Genre: Intelligent dance music
- Length: 39:39
- Label: Thrill Jockey

The Soft Pink Truth chronology
| Do You Want New Wave or Do You Want the Soft Pink Truth? (2004) | Why Do the Heathen Rage? (2014) | Why Pay More? (2015) |

Why Do the Heathen Rage? is a 2014 album by The Soft Pink Truth of house and techno renditions of black metal songs.

== Track listing ==
Track listing adapted from AllMusic.

| No. | Title | Original artist | Length |
|---|---|---|---|
| 1. | "Invocation for Strength" | Moonrose Shaundel Angeles | 2:02 |
| 2. | "Black Metal" | Venom | 3:13 |
| 3. | "Sadomatic Rites" | Beherit | 4:01 |
| 4. | "Ready to Fuck" | Sarcófago | 4:52 |
| 5. | "Satanic Black Devotion" | Sargeist | 4:11 |
| 6. | "Beholding the Throne of Might" | Darkthrone | 4:48 |
| 7. | "Let There Be Ebola Frost" | AN | 5:17 |
| 8. | "Buried by Time and Dust" | Mayhem | 5:22 |
| 9. | "Maniac" | Hellhammer | 4:49 |
| 10. | "Grim and Frostbitten Gay Bar" | Impaled Northern Moonforest | 1:04 |
| Total length: | | | 39:39 |

== Reception ==
Professional ratings
Aggregate scores
| Source | Rating |
|---|---|
| Metacritic | 82/100 |
Review scores
| Source | Rating |
| AllMusic | 4/5 stars |
| Exclaim! | 9/10 |
| Fact | 4/5 stars |
| The Line of Best Fit | 8.5/10 |
| Paste | 8.9/10 |
| Pitchfork | 8.2/10 |
| PopMatters | 8/10 |
| Q | 4/5 stars |
| Resident Advisor | 4/5 |
| Tiny Mix Tapes | 4/5 stars |

The album received "universal acclaim", according to review score aggregator Metacritic.
