= (Drawing) Rings Around the World =

Single by Super Furry Animals

Single by Super Furry Animals

from the album Rings Around the World
- Released: 8 October 2001
- Recorded: Monnow Valley Studio, Rockfield, Monmouthshire, 2000
- Genre: Alternative rock; glam rock
- Length: 3:29
- Label: Epic
- Songwriter: Super Furry Animals
- Producers: Super Furry Animals and Chris Shaw

Super Furry Animals singles chronology
"Juxtapozed with U" (2000)	"(Drawing) Rings Around the World" (2001)	"It's Not the End of the World?" (2002)

"(Drawing) Rings Around the World" is a song by Super Furry Animals and was the second single taken from the band's fifth album, Rings Around the World. The track reached number 28 on the UK Singles Chart on release in October 2001. Singer Gruff Rhys has described the song as being about "rings of communication around the world. All the rings of pollution".

Critical reaction to the track was generally positive with many reviewers comparing the song to the work of other groups such as Status Quo, ELO and The Beach Boys. A promotional music video was produced to accompany "(Drawing) Rings Around the World"'s release as a single. Directed by Pedro Romhanyi the video features images of fictional television stations including "SFA TV", which shows the band playing along with the track. An alternative video, directed by Sean Hillen, was included on the DVD version of Rings Around the World on its release in July 2001. This video features the lyrics to the track scrolling slowly from the bottom of the screen upwards in front of an image of a globe. The DVD version of Rings Around the World also includes a Llwybr Llaethog remix of "(Drawing) Rings Around the World".

== Themes and recording ==
According to lead vocalist Gruff Rhys, "(Drawing) Rings Around the World" is about "all the rings of communication around the world. All the rings of pollution, and all the radioactivity that goes around. If you could visualize all the things we don't see, Earth could look like some kind of fucked-up Saturn. And that's the idea I have in my head – surrounded by communication lines and traffic and debris thrown out of spaceships." Rhys has claimed that the theory was initially his girlfriend's father's. The track was recorded in 2000 at Monnow Valley Studio, Rockfield, Monmouthshire and was produced by the Super Furry Animals and Chris Shaw.

== Musical structure ==
Super Furry Animals "(Drawing) Rings Around the World" (2001)
Short sample from "(Drawing) Rings Around the World" featuring the track's outro. The clip illustrates the track's guitar counter-melody, the harmony backing vocals which accompany main singer Gruff Rhys and clips of phonecalls the band made to random people which accompany the main vocals.

"(Drawing) Rings Around the World" is 3 minutes 29 seconds long and is in the key of B major. The track begins with feedback which plays while drums and a guitar, playing a riff based around a B chord, fade in. The first verse begins on 25 seconds with Gruff Rhys singing the lines "You expose the film in me, we're drawing rings around the world" backed by harmony vocals on the title phrase. A short bridge plays, during which the guitar chords change from B, E and F♯ to just E, F♯, E, F♯. Another verse, bridge and verse play before the last bridge which begins at 1 minute 23 seconds. The outro starts at 1 minute 32 seconds with Rhys singing "Ring ring, ring ring, rings around the world" over the chords B, D and F♯ backed by harmony vocals. A guitar counter-melody begins at 2 minutes 2 seconds and excerpts from phone calls the band made to random people around the world, including calls to the United States embassies in Madagascar and Moscow, a record shop in Osaka and a record company in Australia, play as the track fades out.

=== Alternative version ===
A Llwybr Llaethog remix of "(Drawing) Rings Around the World" is included on the DVD version of Rings Around The World. The track is 3 minutes 33 seconds in length and begins with a reed organ playing a riff in the key of B major. The remix largely follows the arrangement of the original but, for the majority of its duration, dispenses with the instrumental backing, featuring just Gruff Rhys's main vocals, the band's backing vocals and excerpts from the random phonecalls the group made alongside occasional organ and cymbals. Towards the end of the track the original version's guitar, drums and bass appear briefly before the song ends with the same reed organ riff that appeared at the start.

== Critical response ==
Critical reaction to "(Drawing) Rings Around the World" was generally positive with many journalists comparing the song to the work of other groups. Writing for the NME, Ted Kessler described the track as "Status Quo for Generation X-ers with a Manhattan Portage full of millennial tension" and went on to ask "who said there was anything wrong with that?" in his review of the song on its release as a single, despite his earlier review of Rings Around the World claiming that the album would benefit from the removal of the "Status Quo-ish title track". Q described the track as "excellent" while PopMatters claimed the song "sounds so much like ELO that it blows away everything on last year's ELO reunion album" and the Dallas Observer stated that "(Drawing) Rings Around the World" is a "Beach Boys/Beatles/ELO homage as fine as the '70s heyday of Roy Wood's Wizzard or very early Cheap Trick". Pitchfork Media stated that the song "takes the upbeat Britpop of their debut album and layers on spectral details" while Uncut described the track as "tooled up rock 'n' roll modelled on "Surfin' USA". The Guardian claimed the song's lyrics tackle environmental issues with a "sharp wit" while Drowned in Sound saw them as evidence that chief songwriter Gruff Rhys was "taking his lyrics a little bit more seriously". The song was placed at number 21 in the 2001 Festive Fifty on John Peel's BBC Radio 1 show. "(Drawing) Rings Around the World" appeared on the soundtrack to the 2001 film Me Without You.

=== Accolades ===
Publication	Country	Accolade	Year	Rank
John Peel show, BBC Radio 1	United Kingdom	John Peel's Festive 50	2001	21
The Village Voice	United States	Pazz & Jop Singles of 2002	2002	139

== Music videos ==
=== Sean Hillen video ===
A Sean Hillen-directed music video was included on the DVD version of Rings Around the World released July 2001.

The video begins with a static shot of the 1994 collage The Great Pyramids of Carlingford Lough, Irelantis by Hillen, which shows a man in a red jumper sat in a wooded area overlooking a river and three pyramids (this image was used for the front cover of all three formats of the single). The camera moves up to reveal a rotating globe in a stary sky. As "(Drawing) Rings Around the World" begins to play, the text "In the beginning... No! Long before that..." scrolls slowly from the bottom of the screen upwards. The song's lyrics are displayed in the same manner throughout the remainder of the video as several objects circle the globe including a flying saucer, metal cube and fireworks. Occasionally the camera switches to a close up view of the globe showing models of huge missile firing electricity pylons. As the song comes to an end the text "Every building has been built" appears in the middle of the screen and the camera pans down to show a black-and-white version of the Hillen collage used in the opening shot.

Keyboard player Cian Ciaran has stated that the band deliberately tried to avoid making videos that looked like just "another pop promo ... like MTV" for the DVD version of Rings Around the World and asked the directors to make the visuals as "extreme as possible". Ciaran claims the directors had to "work even harder at creating something interesting" due to the limited budget available.

=== Pedro Romhanyi video ===
The promotional video for "(Drawing) Rings Around the World" features the band performing on "SFA television".

A promotional music video, directed by Pedro Romhanyi, was produced to accompany the release of "(Drawing) Rings Around the World" as a single. According to Gruff Rhys the band made separate videos for Rings Around the World's three singles as they saw the videos included on the DVD release of the album as "pure art" whereas they needed promotional music videos that were more like adverts for the songs.

The video begins with a shot of the band in an all white room playing along to the track. A station identification logo for "SFA television" is seen in the top left and a green graphic appears, showing the volume level being turned up. The camera pans back to reveal a TV which switches channel from "SFA" to a station showing golf. The rest of the video continues this pattern, continually flicking between the band and a variety of other stations, which generally feature similar logos to real life channels but with slightly different names e.g. "Cartoon Animals" (Cartoon Network), "CVQ" (QVC), "Animal Channel" (Discovery Channel) Actors, news presenters, puppets, a golfer, an astronaut and weatherman sing along with the track as the television stops on the channel each appears on. At one point, the band are shown in silhouette in homage to the cover of Hot Rocks 1964-1971 by The Rolling Stones. As the video ends, the camera pans back to show a television in a room with a man having a telephone conversation. The camera continues to pan back showing this image on a television on a shelf in a small room. The camera pans back through three more televisions, each showing an image of the last shot, ending with a TV in a wallpapered room next to an electric fire. A few seconds before the video ends the screen turns to static. The Pedro Romhanyi video appears on the DVD release of the band's greatest hits album Songbook: The Singles, Vol. 1 and the Enhanced CD version of the "(Drawing) Rings Around the World" single.

== Track listing ==
All songs by Super Furry Animals.

- Digipak Enhanced CD (6719082)
1. "(Drawing) Rings Around the World" – 3:30
2. "Edam Anchorman" – 3:22
3. "All the Shit U Do" – 2:30

"(Drawing) Rings Around the World (Video)" – 3:30

- 12" (6719086), MC (6719084)
1. "(Drawing) Rings Around the World" – 3:30
2. "Edam Anchorman" – 3:22
3. "All the Shit U Do" – 2:30

== Personnel ==
- Gruff Rhys – vocals
- Huw Bunford – guitar
- Guto Pryce – bass guitar
- Cian Ciaran – keyboards
- Dafydd Ieuan – drums

== Singles chart positions ==
Chart	Peak position
UK Singles Chart	28
