= H5 (French company) =

French design and animation studio

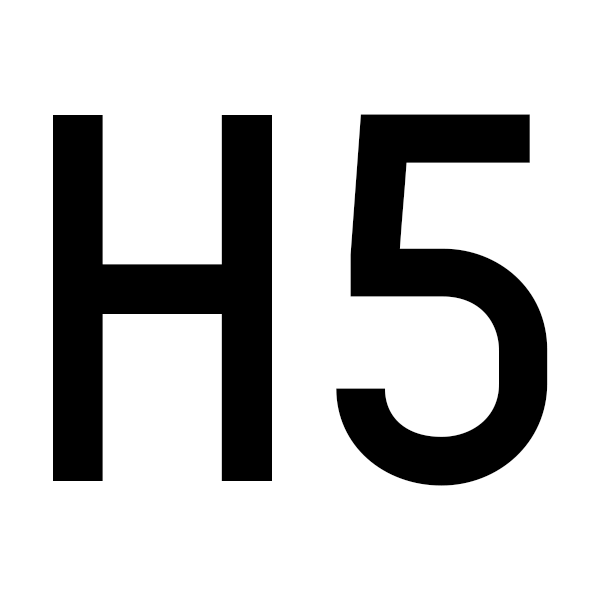
- Type: Private
- Industry: Graphic design, animation
- Founded: 1994; 32 years ago
- Founder: Ludovic Houplain; Antoine Bardou-Jacquet
- Headquarters: Paris, France
- Key people: Ludovic Houplain; Antoine Bardou-Jacquet; François Alaux; Hervé de Crécy
- Products: Animated films
- Website: https://www.h5.fr

H5 is a French design and animation studio founded by Ludovic Houplain and Antoine Bardou-Jacquet in 1994. Under Houplain's art direction, H5's work can mostly be found in the fields of music videos (visuals for Air, Super Discount, Etienne de Crécy, Röyksopp, Le Tone, Alex Gopher, Darkel, Cosmo Vitelli and Demon) and luxury advertising (Dior, Cartier, Hugo Boss, Hermès and Lancôme). Since 1999, H5 has also worked as a collective of directors. They also made their first animated clips, such as animated typography for Alex Gopher, a cartoon for Zebda, digital animations for Super Furry Animals and Playgroup.

H5 made the clips for Röyksopp's "Remind Me" (which won the MTV Europe Award for Best Video in 2002), Massive Attack's "Special Cases", Goldfrapp's "Twist" and a series of advertising campaigns for France and worldwide: Areva, Audi, Citroën, Volkswagen's "Train Fantôme" (1st award Film Cinema, Club of the DA on 2006). H5 is at present represented in France by Addict.

Their first animated short film, Logorama, was selected at the Week of Criticism at the Cannes Film Festival 2009 and at CineVegas in 2009. The film won the Kodak Prix at Cannes and won the Academy Award for Best Animated Short Film at the 82nd Academy Awards.

In parallel, H5's work was presented in numerous exhibitions and festivals, in Paris (National Center of Art and Culture Georges-Pompidou, Paris sleepless night 2007, French National Library, Gallery Anatome), London (Institute of Contemporary Arts, National Museum of Photography, British Film Institute), Tokyo (Sendai Mediatheque), Rotterdam (NAI), New York (MoMA) and Los Angeles (Egyptian Theater).

== History ==
The H5 design studio was founded in 1993. He specialized at the beginning in the realization of graphic projects then the artistic direction of labels in the field of electronic music (in particular for artists and labels of the French Touch). This collective designs its first animated clips from 1999, in particular that of The Child by Alex Gopher based on 3D animated typography which makes them known and launches the activity of H5 in advertising.

Their 2002 music video for Remind Me Röyksopp, which depicts the day of an average office worker solely using animated infographics footage, is also noted, notably winning Best Music Video at the MTV Europe Music Awards 2002.

== Filmography ==
=== Music videos ===
- Chloé – "The Dawn". Production H5 Paris 2018.
- Black Strobe – "For Those Who Came To Earth Thru The Devil’s Asshole". Laurent Chanez & H5, Production H5 Paris 2014.
- Alex Gopher ft. Saint Michel – "Hello Inc.". Production Stink 2012.
- Darkel – "At the End of the Sky". Production Addict 2006.
- Étienne Daho – "Retour à Toi". Production Addict 2003.
- Goldfrapp – "Twist". Production John Payne pour Black Dog Films 2003.
- Audio Bullys – "The Things". Production Philip Tidy pour Black Dog Films 2003.
- Massive Attack – "Special Cases". Production Pete Shuttleworth pour Black Dog Films 2003.
- Röyksopp – "Remind Me". Production John Payne pour Black Dog Films 2002.
- Sinema – "In My Eyes". Production H5 2002.
- Wuz (Alex Gopher & Demon) – "Use Me". Production H5 2002.
- Air – "How Does It Make You Feel". Production Partizan Midi Minuit 2001.
- Playgroup – "Number One". Production Partizan Midi Minuit 2001.
- Super Furry Animals – "Juxtapozed with U". Production Partizan Midi Minuit 2001.
- Alain Souchon – "Rive Gauche". Production Partizan Midi Minuit 2000.
- Zebda – "Oualalaradime". Production Partizan Midi-Minuit 2000.
- Alex Gopher – "The Child". Production Le Village 1999.

=== Advertising ===
- Ecologic – Le recyclage, ça marche. Production H5 2011
- Areva – Energy. One powerful story. Production Addict 2010.
- Smart – Cinéma. Production Addict 2010.
- Celsius – Papillon Tourbillon Mobile Phone. Production H5 2010.
- Gatorade – G2. Production Addict 2009.
- Areva – Athlenergy. Production Addict 2009.
- Total – Les Mots. Production Addict 2008.
- Toyota – Breath. Production Addict 2008.
- Volkswagen Touran – Train Fantôme. Production Addict 2007.
- Cartier – Ballon Bleu. Production H5 2007.
- Citroën C4 – Ice Skater. Production H5 2006.
- Toyota Yaris – 1000. Production Addict 2006.
- Areva – Experts en Energie. Production Addict 2004.
- Audi A4 S-line – Un Peu Plus Qu'Une A4. Production Addict 2003.
- Vuitton – Bellaix. Production H5 2003.

=== Short films ===
- Logorama – Production Autour de Minuit / H5 2009.

== Exhibitions ==
- Moving Types – Gutenberg-Museum. Mayence 2011
- Collector – Tripostal. Lille 2011
- Graphisme et Création Contemporaine – BNF. Paris 2011
- Type in Motion – Museum Für Gestaltung. Zürich 2011
- L.I.P. (Logo in Peace) – Festival International de l'Affiche et du Graphisme. Chaumont 2010
- New Directors/New Films Festival – Logorama. MoMA. New York 2010
- Hors Piste – H5: d'Alex Gopher à Logorama. Centre Georges-Pompidou. Paris 2010
- One Dot Zero – H5 Retrospective. British Film Institute. Londres 2009
- Design Parade – Villa Noailles. Hyères 2009
- 2036 – Biennale Internationale du Design. Saint-Etienne 2008
- La pub s'anime – Musée de la Publicité. Paris 2008
- La Force de l'art – Grand Palais. Paris 2006
- Multiples H5 – Galerie Anatome. Paris 2006
- D.DAY, le design aujourd’hui – Centre Georges-Pompidou. Paris 2005
- Premieres – MoMA. New York 2004
- Clip city – The Netherlands Architecture institute. Rotterdam 2002
- Graphisme(s) – BNF. Paris 2001
- Movement – Sendai Mediatheque. Tokyo 2001

== Awards ==
- Logorama
  - 2011 – César Award for Best Short Film
  - 2010 – Academy Award for Animated Short Film
  - 2009 – Best Short Film – Stockholm International Film Festival
  - 2009 – Kodak Award at la Semaine de la Critique du Festival de Cannes 2009
  - 2009 – Public Award – Festival international de Curtas Metragans
  - 2009 – Public Award – Lille International Short Film Festival
  - 2009 – Special Jury Award, Public Award, Fuji Award for Best Director – Cinanima International Animated Film Festival
  - 2009 – Best Direction Award, Public Award – Vendome Film Festival
  - 2009 – Gold medal of animation – Zinebi, Bilbao International Film Festival
- Röyksopp – Remind Me
  - 2002 – MTV Award Best European Music Video. Barcelona
  - 2002 – Club des DA. 1st Vidéo Clip Award. Paris
- Alex Gopher – The Child
  - 2000 – Club des DA. 1st Vidéo Clip Award. Paris

== Bibliography ==
- This Is the End – Cover art by H5. Editions B42 2009
- Gas Book 18 – H5. Éditions BNN 2005
