= The Soft Pink Truth =

Band

- Genres: Electronic, microhouse, techno
- Occupation: DJ
- Years active: 2003–present
- Labels: Soundslike; Tigerbeat6
- Members: Drew Daniel
- Website: Official website

The Soft Pink Truth is an experimental house music side-project from Drew Daniel, one-half of experimental electronic music duo Matmos. Daniel started the project on a dare from Matthew Herbert that he could not produce a house record. Do You Party?, the first album from the Soft Pink Truth, was released in 2003, and featured, among other original songs, a cover of Vanity 6's "Make Up".

In 2004, Daniel followed up with the Soft Pink Truth's second album, entitled Do You Want New Wave (Or Do You Want the Soft Pink Truth?) (irreverently abbreviated to DYWNWODYWTSPT), a reference to a song by Minutemen. The album consisted entirely of house covers of classic hardcore and punk songs including "Do They Owe Us a Living?" by Crass, 'Homosexual' by the Angry Samoans and "Real Shocks" by the Swell Maps.

The Soft Pink Truth also has recorded a number of remixes, including one for Björk's single "It's in Our Hands". Matmos had also collaborated with Björk on her 2001 album Vespertine.

In October 2007, Daniel announced on his site that he was creating new music under the guise of the Soft Pink Tube. The album, Why Pay More?, was released in 2015, but under the regular Soft Pink Truth alias.

In 2014, the Soft Pink Truth released an album of black metal covers entitled Why Do the Heathen Rage?, with the subtitle "Electronic Profanations of Black Metal Classics". The album featured guest appearances from Anohni (listed on the album as Antony Hegarty), Terence Hannum of Locrian, Jenn Wasner of Wye Oak, M.C. Schmidt (Daniel's partner in Matmos), and Owen Gardner of Horse Lords. A video for the cover of Venom's song "Black Metal" was released on Vimeo.

In 2020, the musical act released two albums: Shall We Go on Sinning So That Grace May Increase?, made up of original compositions on Thrill Jockey and Am I Free to Go?, a collection of crust punk covers that raised money for the International Anti-Fascist Defence Fund.

== Discography ==
=== Albums ===
- Do You Party? (2003), Soundslike
- Do You Want New Wave or Do You Want the Soft Pink Truth? (2004), Tigerbeat6
- Why Do the Heathen Rage? (2014), Thrill Jockey
- Why Pay More? (2015), self-published
- Shall We Go on Sinning So That Grace May Increase? (2020), Thrill Jockey
- Am I Free to Go? (2020), self-published
- Is It Going to Get Any Deeper Than This? (2022), Thrill Jockey
- Can Such Delightful Times Go On Forever? (2026), Thrill Jockey

=== Singles & EP ===
- "Do It Quite Sloppily" 12" (2001)
- "Soft Pink Missy" 12" (2001)
- "PromoFunk" 12" (2002)
- "Acting Crazy" 12" (2003)
- "Do You Party?" 2x12" (2003)
- Was It Ever Real? EP (2022)
