= Kelley Polar =

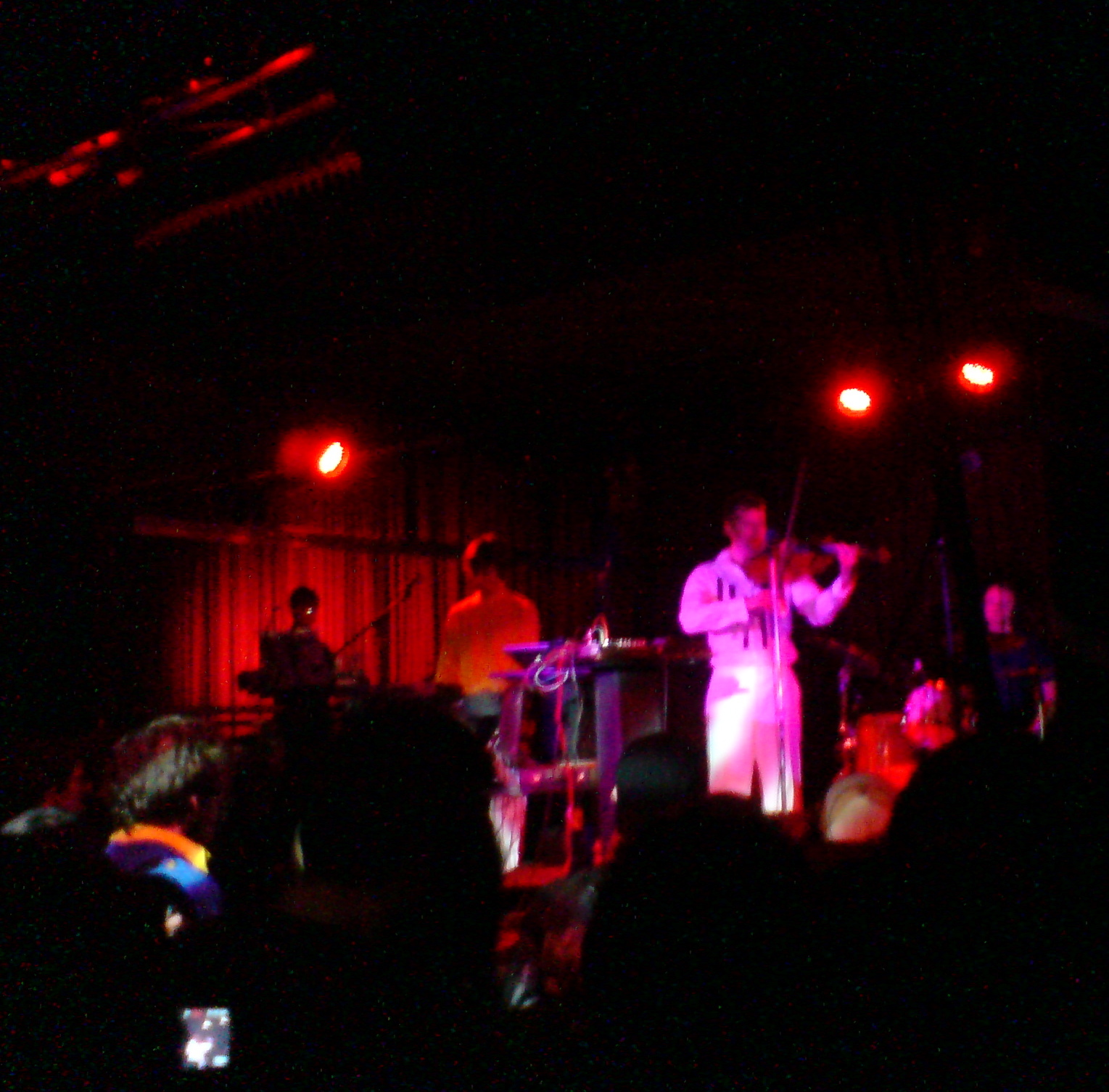
- Kelley Polar
- Born: Michael Kelley
- Relatives: Blevin Blectum (sister)
- Musical career
- Origin: Sullivan, New Hampshire
- Genres: Alternative dance vocalist; producer

Kelley Polar, born Michael Kelley, is an American musician, alternative dance vocalist and music producer. He is based in Harrisville, New Hampshire.

== Career ==
Originally a classical violist from Providence, Rhode Island, he studied at the Oberlin Conservatory and then at Juilliard, where he collaborated with Metro Area's Darshan Jesrani and Morgan Geist on tracks like "Miura", "The Art of Hot" and "Caught Up". He released a number of solo EPs under the alias of the Kelley Polar Quartet on Environ Records. His first album as Kelley Polar, Love Songs of the Hanging Gardens, was released in 2005 and contains elements of house, disco and pop. His follow-up I Need You To Hold On While The Sky Is Falling was released in March 2008 in the US and most of Europe. In 2012, Madonna sampled Polar's "Ashamed of Myself" in a medley, mixing it up with her own songs "Candy Shop" and "Erotica" in one of the most talked about sections of the MDNA Tour, giving Kelley Polar worldwide exposure.

He is the younger brother of Blevin Blectum.

As Mike Kelley, he is the violist for the Apple Hill Chamber Players.

== Discography ==
Year	Title	Artist(s)	Label	Type	Notes
2002	Audition EP	Kelley Polar Quartet	Environ, New York City, New York	Single/EP	
2003	Recital EP	Kelley Polar Quartet	Environ, New York City, New York	Single/EP	
2004	Rococo EP	Kelley Polar Quartet	Environ, New York City, New York	Single/EP	
2005	Love Songs of the Hanging Gardens	Kelley Polar	Environ, New York City, New York	Album	
2007	Chrysanthemum	Kelley Polar	Environ, New York City, New York	Single/EP	
2008	I Need You To Hold On While The Sky Is Falling	Kelley Polar	Environ, New York City, New York	Album	
2011	I'm Not What You Want	Kelley Polar	Environ, New York City, New York	Single/EP	
2022	Control	Kelley Polar, Morgan Geist (Au Suisse)	City Slang, Berlin, Germany	Single/EP	
2022	Au Suisse	Kelley Polar, Morgan Geist (Au Suisse)	City Slang, Berlin, Germany	Album	
