= Do You Want New Wave or Do You Want the Soft Pink Truth? =

Studio album by The Soft Pink Truth
- Released: October 25, 2004
- Genre: Electronic, microhouse, experimental techno
- Label: Soundslike; Tigerbeat6 MEOW110

The Soft Pink Truth chronology
Do You Party? (2003)	Do You Want New Wave or Do You Want the Soft Pink Truth? (2004)

Professional ratings
Aggregate scores
Source	Rating
Metacritic	71/100
Review scores
Source	Rating
AllMusic	4/5 stars
Alternative Press	0.5/5 stars
The Guardian	3/5 stars
Pitchfork	8.5/10
PlayLouder	3/5 stars
Q	4/5 stars
Spin	A−
Stylus	B
Uncut	3/5 stars
URB	4.5/5 stars

Do You Want New Wave or Do You Want the Soft Pink Truth? is the second album by the Soft Pink Truth, a side-project of Drew Daniel of the electronic music duo Matmos.

This album consists of covers of various punk rock and hardcore bands from the 1970s and '80s. The album title itself is an allusion to the song title "Do You Want New Wave or Do You Want the Truth?" by the Minutemen from their Double Nickels on the Dime album. Only the last song is not a punk cover.

== Track listing ==
1. "Kitchen" (L. Voag) – 3:05
2. "Do They Owe Us a Living?" (Crass) – 4:43
3. "In School" (Die Kreuzen) – 1:07
4. "Media Friend/V.S.B." (Rudimentary Peni) – 4:57
5. "I Owe It to the Girls" (Teddy & the Frat Girls) – 3:13
6. "Out of Step" (Minor Threat) – 3:01
7. "Real Shocks" (Swell Maps) – 3:39
8. "Confession" (Nervous Gender) – 4:36
9. "Homo-sexual" (Angry Samoans) – 3:08
10. "Lookin' Back" (Carol Channing) – 0:48

== Personnel ==
- Drew Daniel – synthesizer, turntables, vocals, sampling, sequencers, CD players

Extra musicians

- Vicki Bennett – vocals
- Blevin Blectum – vocals
- Martin C. Schmidt – synthesizer, Dumbek, vocals
- Jeremy Scott – vocals
- Dani Siciliano – vocals

Technical staff

- Drew Daniel – editing, mixing
- Xopher Davidson – mastering
- Rex Ray – design
