= It's Not the End of the World? =

Single by Super Furry Animals

from the album Rings Around the World
- Released: 14 January 2002
- Recorded: Bearsville Studios, Woodstock, 2000
- Genre: Alternative rock
- Length: 3:25
- Label: Epic
- Songwriter: Super Furry Animals
- Producers: Super Furry Animals and Chris Shaw

Super Furry Animals singles chronology
| "(Drawing) Rings Around the World" (2001) | "It's Not the End of the World?" (2002) | "Golden Retriever" (2003) |

"It's Not the End of the World?" is a song by Welsh band Super Furry Animals. It was the last single to be released from the Rings Around the World album and reached number 30 on the UK Singles Chart on its release in January 2002. Singer Gruff Rhys has variously described the track as being about the extinction of mankind and as "a romantic song about growing old".

Critical reaction to the track was generally mixed with some reviewers claiming the track compares unfavourably with the band's previous work while others were enthusiastic in their praise. A computer generated promotional music video was produced to accompany "It's Not the End of the World?"'s release as a single. Directed by Numero 6 the video won the special jury prize at the 2002 Imagina Festival. An alternative video, directed by Dylan Jones, was included on the DVD release of Rings Around the World featuring archive footage of nuclear explosions.

== Themes and recording ==
"It's Not the End of the World?" is "a romantic song about growing old" according to singer Gruff Rhys. In an interview with British newspaper The Daily Telegraph Rhys discussed the song in the context of parent record Rings Around the World. The band abandoned the idea of making a "save the world" concept album as they reasoned that "when people talk about saving the world they're really talking about saving humans. The reality is that humans are the problem". "It's Not the End of the World?" expands on this idea with Rhys stating that the song is about human extinction: "maybe we'll all die but the world'll still be here, even if it's a dark, singed piece of rock flying around the sun". The track was recorded in 2000 at Bearsville Studios, Woodstock and was produced by the Super Furry Animals and Chris Shaw.

== Musical structure ==
Super Furry Animals "It's Not the End of the World?" (2001)
Short sample from "It's Not the End of the World?" featuring the track's second chorus and bridge. The clip illustrates Huw Bunford's guitar counter-melody, played during the chorus, Gruff Rhys's falsetto vocals on the bridge and the string arrangement by Sonia Slay and the group which plays during the bridge.

"It's Not the End of the World?" is 3 minutes 25 seconds long and is in the key of C major. The track begins with just a guitar, featuring an echo effect, playing the descending notes C, B, A, G, F, E, D and G before the band join on 13 seconds with the bridge during which Gruff Rhys sings the word "why" several times in a falsetto voice, accompanied by strings arranged by Sonia Slay and the group. The first verse follows on 38 seconds with Rhys accompanied by a basic 4/4 beat provided by drummer Dafydd Ieuan, sparse bass guitar and a melody line played by Huw Bunford on guitar. The first chorus enters at 1 minute 4 seconds with Rhys singing the words "as our hair turns white, all the stars still shine so bright above, at least it's not the end of the world" while Bunford plays a guitar counter-melody. Another bridge and verse follow before the second chorus appears at 2 minutes 2 seconds with Rhys this time singing "as our hair turns grey everything is far from A-A-A-ok". The outro begins at 2 minute 23 seconds, with the chorus repeating before the bridge plays through several times, ending on a C chord.

=== Alternative version ===
A Force Unknown remix of "It's Not the End of the World?" is included on the DVD version of Rings Around The World. The track is 3 minutes 52 seconds in length and begins with just cymbals then drums before the bridge. The remix follows the arrangement of the original with Gruff Rhys's vocals and all instruments heavily affected by echo. Instrumentation is sparse with only occasional guitar.

== Critical response ==
Critical reaction to "It's Not the End of the World?" was generally mixed. Website Drowned in Sound described the song as "sweet and charming" but stated that, although it is a good album track it isn't strong enough to stand up on its own as a single and is rather "bland" compared to some of the band's other songs such as "Demons" and "Fire in My Heart". The NME called the song "a bit rubbish" by the Super Furries' "usual high standards" and went as far as to claim that "John Lennon was shot for less". The Dallas Observer claimed the track is "guaranteed to induce the same type of melancholic, goose-bumpy splendor that tunes like The Kinks' 'Waterloo Sunset', Dennis Wilson's 'Forever' and Jack Bruce's 'Theme for an Imaginary Western' still do", Entertainment Weekly described it as one of the best songs on parent album Rings Around the World, comparing it to the work of The Beatles while The Daily Telegraph called it a "honey-dripping pop classic". Adrien Begrand of PopMatters claimed the track "sounds like any of Blur's best ballads".

== Music videos ==
=== Dylan Jones video ===
A Dylan Jones directed video was included on the DVD version of Rings Around the World on its release in July 2001.

The video consists entirely of archive footage of nuclear explosions and nuclear technicians. Keyboard player Cian Ciaran has stated that the band deliberately tried to avoid making videos that looked like just "another pop promo ... like MTV" for the DVD version of Rings Around the World and asked the directors to make the visuals as "extreme as possible". Ciaran claims the directors had to "work even harder at creating something interesting" due to the limited budget available.

=== Numero 6 video ===
The promotional video for "It's Not the End of the World?" features war imagery. In this screenshot a baby sits between two nuclear missiles.

A promotional music video, directed by animator Numero 6 (also known as David Nicolas), was produced to accompany the release of "It's Not the End of the World?" as a single. According to Gruff Rhys the band made separate videos for Rings Around the World's three singles as they saw the videos included on the DVD release of the album as "pure art" whereas they needed promotional music videos that were more like adverts for the songs. The video won the special jury prize at the 2002 Imagina Festival and took silver at the D&AD awards in the same year.

The video begins with a shot of a computer generated man with a guitar and sunglasses walking down a set of spiral stairs singing along with "It's Not the End of the World?'s" chorus. A baby is then shown playing with a toy tank before a man seen receiving his call up papers, having his head shaved by a barber then leaving on a steam train as people outside wave goodbye. The next shot features a battleship—the video then cuts to a small boy playing with a toy ship in the bath before joints of meat on hooks are seen moving from right to left through a tiled room spattered with blood. A shot of a military commander on horseback addressing his troops appears before the second chorus which again features a guitarist singing along as he walks down spiral stairs. After brief footage of a tank driving across a desert landscape a baby is shown playing with a paper aeroplane. A hat is placed on the baby's head and the head is then removed and fitted onto the body of a bomber pilot. The next scene shows a fleet of bombers bombing a city while an anti-aircraft gunner fires at them and troops parachute down. A soldier is seen running across a bombed out city before two opposing troops are shown repeatably stabbing each other with bayonets on a battlefield landscape filled with human skulls. This scene is intercut with footage of two military leaders playing chess. The third chorus features similar footage to the first two—a singer walking down a set of stairs. The two military leaders are then seen appearing on a game show, each pressing a buzzer which makes an image of a skull behind them light up. The video cuts to a shot of a baby sitting between two nuclear missiles before a zoomed out model of the Earth shows multiple mushroom clouds as the planet explodes (this image was used as the front cover for Digipak CD version of the single). The final shot sees the two opposing commanders holding hands and kissing on a tiny piece of the earth as it floats through space while a red heart lights up behind them. The Numero 6 video appears on the DVD release of the band's greatest hits album Songbook: The Singles, Vol. 1 and the DVD version of the "It's Not the End of the World?" single.

David Nicolas also directed the Supermen Lovers' Starlight music video in 2001.

== Track listing ==
All songs by Super Furry Animals.

- Digipak CD (6121752), 12" (6121756)
1. "It's Not the End of the World?" – 3:30
2. "The Roman Road" – 5:18
3. "Gypsy Space Muffin" – 3:32
- DVD (6721759)
1. "It's Not the End of the World? (Video)" – 3:30
2. "The Roman Road" – 5:18
3. "Gypsy Space Muffin" – 3:32

== Personnel ==
- Gruff Rhys – vocals, string arrangements
- Huw Bunford – guitar, string arrangements
- Guto Pryce – bass guitar, string arrangements
- Cian Ciaran – keyboards, string arrangements
- Dafydd Ieuan – drums, string arrangements
- Harriet Harris – violin
- S. Herbert – violin
- Jackie Norrie – violin
- Sonia Slany – violin, string arrangements
- Nick Barr – viola
- Clare Smith – viola
- Nick Cooper – cello
- Sophie Harris – cello

== Chart positions ==
| Chart | Peak position |
|---|---|
| UK Singles Chart | 30 |
