= Logorama =

- Theatrical release poster
- Directed by: François Alaux; Hervé de Crécy; Ludovic Houplain
- Written by: François Alaux; Hervé de Crécy; Ludovic Houplain; Gregory J. Pruss
- Produced by: Autour de Minuit
- Starring: Bob Stephenson; David Fincher; Aja Evans; Sherman Augustus; Joel Michaely; Matt Winston
- Edited by: Samuel Danési
- Music by: Bryan Ray Turcotte; Dayna Turcotte
- Production companies: H5; Autour de Minuit Productions; Little Minx Films; Mikros Image
- Distributed by: Cinema Public Films (France)
- Release date: 20 May 2009 (Cannes)
- Running time: 16 minutes
- Country: France
- Languages: English; French

Logorama is a 2009 French adult animated satirical short film produced by the French graphic design and animation studio H5 as their first and only cinematic project. Co-written and directed by François Alaux, Hervé de Crécy and Ludovic Houplain, the film is set in a stylized version of Los Angeles and portrays various events as being told entirely through the extensive use of more than 2,000 contemporary and historical company logos and mascots. The short's voice cast consists of Bob Stephenson, David Fincher, Aja Evans, Sherman Augustus, Joel Michaely, Matt Winston, Gregory J. Pruss, Josh Eichenbaum, Jaime Ray Newman and Andrew Kevin Walker.

Upon its premiere on 20 May 2009 in Cannes, Logorama has received numerous awards, including winning both the Kodak Discovery Award for Best Short Film (the Kodak Prix) at the 2009 Cannes Film Festival and the Academy Award for Best Animated Short Film at the 82nd Academy Awards the following year.

== Plot ==
In Los Angeles, the city and neighborhoods are constructed from corporate emblems: Bentley and Aston Martin logos soar overhead like birds in flight, while MSN's butterflies flutter nearby; the AOL Man appears as pedestrians strolling along the streets; and highway signs display logos from Atlantic Records among others. The original Pringles mascot drives through Malibu, eventually parking in a diner's lot and approaching a break-time Esso waitress smoking an Air France cigarette, trying to flirt, but she declines, tossing her cigarette aside as she walks off.

Meanwhile, by from the Santa Monica Pier, two police officers as Michelin Men named Mitch and Mike are parked in the police cruiser discussing zoo animal captivity. Their conversation ends when Mike is sent to pick up lunch from KFC for both. As he leaves with a soft drink bearing a Dunkin' Donuts logo and a bucket of fried chicken, a criminal called Ronald McDonald is seen smuggling weapons in a red delivery van at a nearby gas station selling diesel. Mitch receives a message on the radio, revealing that the criminal is now on the loose.

Spotting Ronald in shock from afar, Mike rushes outside KFC, accidentally bumping into Fido Dido and knocking him over. Once in the car, the police pursue Ronald; during the chase, innocent bystanders and motorists suffer accidental injuries and crash their vehicles. Across town, BiC Boy students, along with Big Boy and Haribo Boy, are on a guided tour of the Los Angeles Zoo led by a flamboyant Mr. Clean; tired of the tour, Big Boy and Haribo Boy leave the train and run to the lion exhibit. There, they disturb the MGM lion while he sleeps: Haribo moons him, and Big Boy throws an empty Coke bottle at him while insulting him, prompting the zoo's owner, the Jolly Green Giant, to reprimand them.

Meanwhile, the chase starts on the highway, endangering more motorists, pedestrians, and drivers as Ronald and the police speed along an off-ramp leading in a Street in town. The tour group quickly boards their school bus, leaving the zoo en route to the Pizza Hut where the chase is broadcast live on a television set, while Esso Girl serves coffee to the original Pringles mascot and the Hot & Spicy mascot, assisted by the Pillsbury Doughboy. When Esso Girl approaches, she is groped by the Hot & Spicy mascot, causing her to drop the mug which shatters on the tile, leaving a coffee spill. The chase starts again. risking a lot of motorists, pedestrians, and drivers as Ronald and the police race along an off-ramp, where Red and Yellow are hit and killed at the crosswalk by the cruiser (a piece of M&M candy belonging to Yellow hits the windshield but slides off), despite narrowly avoiding the van. The pursuit ends when Ronald brakes and swerves to avoid the school bus but crashes into a car and a semi-truck, causing his van to slide onto the sidewalk and grass, stopping in front of the Pizza Hut, striking its sign, and crashing the pole, shocking the customers and the Esso Girl inside.

Several guns and biological weapons spill from the wrecked van onto the sidewalk and curb as police arrive. The officers prepare to arrest Ronald and secure the scene, while Big Boy and Haribo Boy, who have exited the school bus, sneak away from the teacher to steal some of the van's disturbed contents for black market sale. Ronald exits his wrecked vehicle, frightening the children, then kicks Haribo Boy unconscious and uses a Heckler & Koch MP5 to take Big Boy hostage. He runs into the Pizza Hut with Big Boy, but Big Boy bites his arm to escape and crawls to the counter where Esso Girl is hiding, as Ronald attempts to shoot him. Police are authorized to open fire, but Ronald retaliates by kicking the glass wall to shoot at them (even denting police cars and shooting a neon sign at a Hard Rock Cafe), after Mitch disobeys orders to hold fire—accidentally hitting Mr. Peanut in the head with a sniper bullet, shattering his shell and causing the nut inside him to fall onto the floor.

The sheriff then calls in SWAT reinforcements, which are delivered to a nearby rooftop to snipe Ronald's head.

As gunfire erupts, a distant tremor shakes Los Angeles, causing a Michelin Man to miss Ronald's head—his intended sniper target—which results in the bullet hitting the diner's roof, ricocheting off the sign's dome, and striking a helicopter's tail rotor, causing it to lose altitude and crash into a Pizza Hut. Thankfully, no one is injured except the Airplane pilot, who loses consciousness, triggering an earthquake. The animals escape, with an elephant running into the Jolly Green Giant and carrying him off after he tries to stop them.

Big Boy and Esso Girl manage to escape the collapsing Pizza Hut with the Pillsbury Doughboy, while the original Pringles mascot and the Hot & Spicy mascot are crushed inside after hiding under a booth. The two hijack Mitch and Mike's police cruiser to flee the scene as the earthquake creates a fissure in the street resembling the Microsoft Gaming Xbox logo that engulfs it. Meanwhile, Mitch attempts to shoot Ronald, but he shoots Mitch in the forehead after he approaches him. Ronald then sneaks away, noticing a row of Grease 2 motorcycles, and rides off on one of them, doing a donut maneuver first as he departs.

While on the move, as zoo animals rampage through the city, he dodges wrecked vehicles, debris, and falling signs, including those for Enron, Freddie Mac, and Kmart, using a fallen Nabisco sign as a ramp. Just as he is about to escape, he crashes into a fallen Weight Watchers sign blocking his way, flying onto the road and sliding into a crevasse resembling the Zenith Electronics logo. When attempting to climb out, he is run over by Esso Girl and Big Boy, but they narrowly escape the city and head toward the hills via Route 66, traveling along a curved highway shaped like the Vaio logo.

The earthquake still continues spreading through the desert and into Marlboro Country, where it forms a canyon amongst an oil field. Approaching the Hollywood Sign, it disintegrates and slides down the hill onto the highway. While avoiding one of the fallen letters, the duo veers off the highway, crashes through a guardrail, and tumbles down a hill, ending in a collision with an apple tree resembling the American Century Investments logo that nearly kills them (they did not have time to put on seat belts) and causes one of the cruiser's front wheels to come off and roll away, scattering its apples violently (some roll away) and stopping the earthquake.

Petroleum erupts from the newly formed desert canyon, flooding Los Angeles and sweeping everything away, prompting some to climb onto the highest points of remaining structures, which serve as islands amid the flooded city and floating debris that stay afloat, all while avoiding hungry crocodiles and trying to find help.

The hill supporting the cruiser, with Esso Girl and Big Boy inside, splits open, revealing a massive The North Face logo, as the surrounding land disintegrates. The remaining land sinks into the sea, leaving behind a tiny island where the duo is stranded. Esso Girl picks up a nearby colored apple and bites into it while lying next to Big Boy on the newly formed island, now part of Southern California and the Baja California peninsula, separated from the mainland and shaped like Nike's swoosh logo, with the Earth depicted as the Universal Pictures logo, featuring the Moon and the Sun.

Finally, it is revealed that outer space, including the planets, are composed of countless logos: Mars representing Red Planet, Orion Pictures as a constellation, the Milky Way Galaxy with its stars, and Pioneer replacing Pioneer 11, etc. Additionally, it is shown that Ronald survived being run over, suffering only severe baldness, a black eye, unfocused eyes, and some missing teeth.

== Voice cast ==
- Bob Stephenson as:
  - Ronald McDonald, a criminal
  - Michelin Man Mike, a serious law enforcement officer the relaxed police officer
  - Michelin Man Sheriff
- David Fincher as Original Pringles Mascot, the initial face of the snack brand
- Andrew Kevin Walker as Pringles Hot & Spicy, known for being argumentative and fiery.
- Aja Evans as the Esso Drop Girl, a waitress who is also taken hostage.
- Sherman Augustus as Michelin Man Mitch the relaxed police officer
- Joel Michaely as:
  - Big Boy, a juvenile delinquent and hostage
  - Jolly Green Giant, a zoo manager
  - Mr. Clean, a campy tour guide.
- Matt Winston as Haribo Boy, Big Boy's second banana and a victim of the hostage crisis.
- Gregory J. Pruss as:
  - Pillsbury Doughboy, a chef at the diner
  - a Chopper Pilot.
- Josh Eichenbaum as Yellow, an innocent bystander caught in the chaos.
- Jaime Ray Newman as the Dispatch Girl on the radio, coordinating communications during the events.

== Themes ==
Logorama explores the extent that logos are embedded in Earth's daily existence. H5 members explained: "Logorama presents us with an over-marketed world built only from logos and real trademarks that are destroyed by a series of natural disasters (including an earthquake and a tidal wave of oil). Logotypes are used to describe an alarming universe (similar to the one that we are living in) with all the graphic signs that accompany us everyday [sic] in our lives. This over-organized universe is violently transformed by the cataclysm becoming fantastic and absurd. It shows the victory of the creative against the rational, where nature and human fantasy triumph".

=== Brands, mascots and logos ===
The entirety of Logorama features numerous brand images, mascots and logos as the characters, props, locations, vehicles and other content. Notable uses include McDonald's mascot Ronald McDonald being depicted as a criminal reminiscent of the Joker, Michelin Men being depicted as the police, and the Esso Oil Drop Girl being depicted as a waitress in a diner. However, some of the logos are also derived from fictional brands, such as Slurm from Futurama, the Ghostbusters logo, and the Buy-N-Large (BnL) logo from WALL-E.

Logos for well-known media such as The Wall, South Park, Sesame Street, COPS, Batman, James Bond, Grease 2, Street Fighter II, The Empire Strikes Back, and Left 4 Dead are included, along with several logos representing musical artists like Gorillaz, Green Day, The Clash, Daft Punk, Public Enemy, Sex Pistols, AC/DC, Run-D.M.C., Fatboy Slim, and Iron Maiden.

== Accolades ==
Logorama has received the following awards and nominations:

- Kodak Discovery Award for Best Short Film (the Kodak Prix) – Critics' Week, 62nd Cannes Film Festival (2009) – Won
- Audience Award – Festival International de Curtas Metragans (2009) – Won
- Audience Award – Lille International Short Film Festival (2009) – Won
- Jury's Special Prize, Audience Prize, Fuji Prize for Best Directors – Cinanima International Animated Film Festival (2009) – Won
- Best Short Film – Stockholm International Film Festival (2009) – Won
- Best Direction, Audience Award – Vendôme Film Festival (2009) – Won
- Gold Medal for Animation – Zinebi, Bilbao International Film Festival (2009) – Won
- Oscar for Best Animated Short – 82nd Academy Awards (2010) – Won
- Best Short Film – Césars 2011 – Won
- Best Animated Film – Césars 2011 – Nominated

== In other media ==
The Simpsons episode "A Tree Grows in Springfield" (season 24, episode 6) ends with a vignette inspired by Logorama, called Logomania.

A catalog inspired by the short, titled Logobook and written by the film's co-director Ludovic Houplain, was published by Taschen in 2013.

== See also ==
- Foodfight! - A 2012 animated film that also features product mascots as characters; seen as one of the worst animated films of all time.
- Criticism of capitalism
- Product placement
