= Disc (band) =

- Origin: San Francisco, California
- Genres: Experimental electronic music, noise
- Years active: 1997–1999
- Labels: Vinyl Communications, Deluxe
- Past members: Drew Daniel; Jason Doerck; Martin Schmidt; Miguel Depedro

Disc is an experimental group formed by Miguel Depedro (Kid606), Jason Doerck (J Lesser), M. C. Schmidt and Drew Daniel (Matmos). The group was most active between 1997 and 1999.

To produce their sound, digital media (DATs, CDs) were etched and painted, or used in broken players to produce new sounds. In Gaijincd4, a "bonus" nonfunctional CD was included to suggest a multimedia disc. The double LP Transfer consisted entirely of locked grooves.

== Discography ==
=== Albums ===
- Gaijincd4 – CD album with bonus nonfunctional CD (December 1997, Vinyl Communications)
- 2xCD – 2×CD album (May 12, 1998, Vinyl Communications)
- Nullsonic – CD collaboration album with KK Null(August 11, 1998, Vinyl Communications)
- Brave2ep – CD album, (October 27, 1998, Vinyl Communications)
- Transfer – 2x12", 10 songs and 105 locked grooves (1999, Delux Recordings)
