= Shall We Go on Sinning So That Grace May Increase? =

Studio album by The Soft Pink Truth
- Released: May 1, 2020
- Length: 43:27
- Label: Thrill Jockey

The Soft Pink Truth chronology
Why Pay More? (2015)	Shall We Go on Sinning So That Grace May Increase? (2020)	Am I Free to Go? (2020)

Professional ratings
Aggregate scores
Source	Rating
Metacritic	87/100
Review scores
Source	Rating
AllMusic	4.5/5 stars
The Arts Desk	5/5 stars
Beats Per Minute	80%
Exclaim!	8/10
musicOMH	5/5 stars
Pitchfork	8.3/10
PopMatters	9/10
Tom Hull	B+
Uncut	8/10

Shall We Go on Sinning So That Grace May Increase? is a studio album by American musician Drew Daniel, under his experimental side project The Soft Pink Truth. It was released on May 1, 2020 under Thrill Jockey.

== Critical reception ==
Shall We Go on Sinning So That Grace May Increase? was met with universal acclaim reviews from critics. At Metacritic, which assigns a weighted average rating out of 100 to reviews from mainstream publications, this release received an average score of 87 based on eight reviews.

Concluding the review for AllMusic, Heather Phares wrote "While it's just as thought-provoking as the Soft Pink Truth's other albums, there's something magical in how the emotional dimensions and deep beauty of Shall We Go on Sinning So That Grace May Increase? reaffirm that positivity and creativity are the most powerful weapons against hate and darkness."

=== Accolades ===
Accolades for Shall We Go on Sinning So That Grace May Increase?
Issuer	Listing	Rank
Metacritic	Best Albums of 2020	27
Pitchfork	The 50 Best Albums of 2020	31

== Track listing ==
Shall We Go on Sinning So That Grace May Increase? track listing
No.	Title	Length
1.	"Shall"	3:10
2.	"We"	5:29
3.	"Go"	2:33
4.	"On"	4:42
5.	"Sinning"	6:17
6.	"So"	5:34
7.	"That"	5:07
8.	"Grace"	6:18
9.	"May Increase"	4:17
