= Kevin Blechdom =

American musician and performance artist

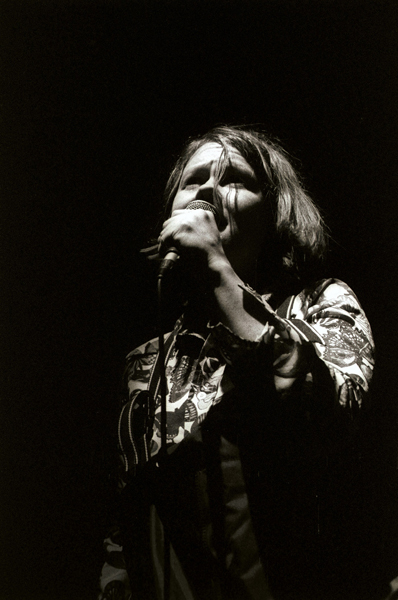

Background information
- Born: Kristin Grace Erickson; 1978 (age 46–47); Florida, United States
- Origin: San Francisco, California
- Genres: Electronica; Electro
- Instruments: Vocals, Piano, Computer, Banjo
- Labels: Sonig, Tigerbeat6, Chicks on Speed Records, Shimmy Disc
- Website: www.kevyb.com

Kevin Blechdom (born Kristin Grace Erickson; 1978 in Florida) is an American experimental electronic musician and performance artist. She is based in Santa Cruz, California.

== Early life and education ==
Kristin Grace Erickson was born in 1978 in Florida and raised in Stuart, Florida. She studied piano and classical music at Florida State University however she was unhappy with the nature of her studies and transferred to Mills College in 1997 to study experimental music. She has a BA degree and MFA degree in electronic music from Mills College.

While she attended Mills College in Oakland, California, she co-founded Blectum from Blechdom with Blevin Blectum (born Bevin Kelley), an experimental electronic group. The two performed together as Blectum from Blechdom for four years, ending in 2002 when Blechdom moved to Berlin, Germany. Blechdom's work changed when she started creating music solo, becoming more personal and about heartbreak.

In 2013, Blectum received a Doctorate of Musical Arts degree in the Performer-Composer Program from the California Institute of the Arts (CalArts).

== Career ==
Blechdom played in an art-rock band, Adult Rodeo, with her brother lumberob, a.k.a. Rob Erickson, and his wife mephany stankins. They released records on Shimmy Disc and Four States Fair.

Kevin Blechdom's solo release Eat My Heart Out features a 13-minute "musical movie" called Countdown to Nothing, a collaboration with Lucile Desamory.

Blechdom produced two albums for New York City anti-folk/cabaret group Ching Chong Song; their debut album, Little Naked Gay Adventure, and their second album, Everything is for Babies.

Blechdom recorded, toured, and performed with Eugene Chadbourne in 2007.

Blechdom also performs with Christopher Fleeger as the computer-country band Barnwave.

She collaborated with Chicks on Speed on the song "Wordy Rappinghood" from their album 99 Cents in 2003 along with other female musicians such as Miss Kittin, Le Tigre, Adult.'s Nicola Kuperus, and Tina Weymouth of the Tom Tom Club. "Wordy Rappinghood" became a moderate dance hit in Europe, peaking at number five on the Belgian Dance Chart, and at number sixty-six on the UK Singles Chart.

== Honors and awards ==
In 2011 she was artist in residence at WORM, a Rotterdam-based institute for avant garde music and art.

In 2001, Blectum From Blechdom won an Award of Distinction for digital music at the Prix Ars Electronica.

== Discography ==
- 2001 – I Heart Presets - CD EP on Tigerbeat6
- 2001 – The Inside Story - 3" CD on Tigerbeat6
- 2002 – Jelly Donuts - 7" vinyl on Four States Fair Records
- 2002 – And The Tempo Of Doom - 7" vinyl on Unbearable Recordings
- 2003 – Your Butt - on Dudini
- 2003 – Bitches Without Britches - CD album on Chicks on Speed Records
- 2005 – Eat My Heart Out - CD album on Chicks on Speed Records
- 2006 - Kevin Blechdom Live At PBS - CD on Dual Plover
- 2008 – The Children's Suite, with Ad Hawk - 7" vinyl on Dual Plover
- 2009 – Gentlemania - CD album on Sonig
