= Joel Michaely =

American actor and film producer

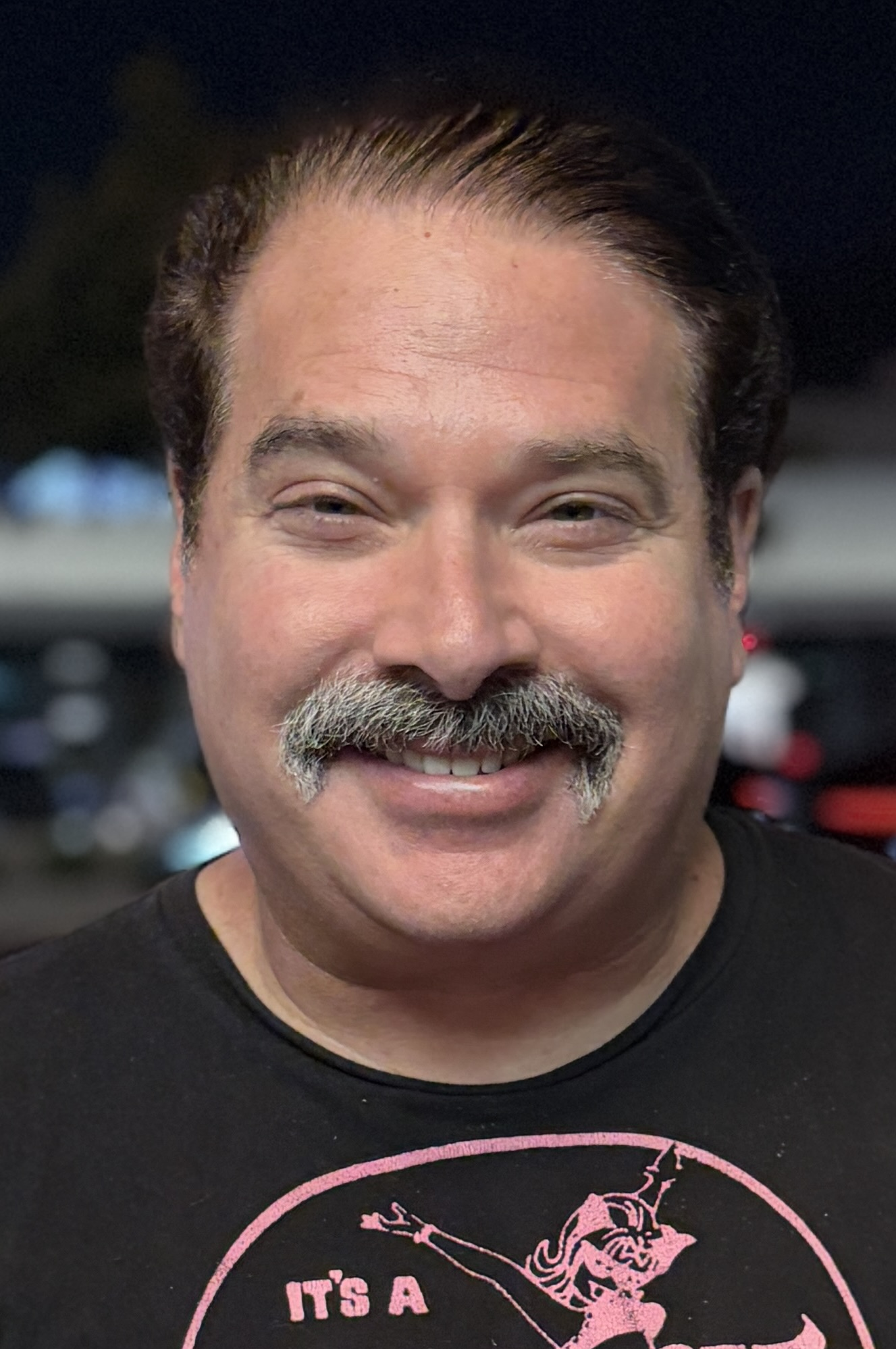
- Michaely in 2026
- Occupations: Actor; Film producer
- Years active: 1989-present
- Notable work: The Rules of Attraction; But I'm a Cheerleader

Joel Michaely is an American actor and film producer.

He has appeared in such films as Can't Hardly Wait, But I'm a Cheerleader, Ghost World, The Rules of Attraction, Kiss Kiss Bang Bang,Cruel World, Factory Girl, Itty Bitty Titty Committee, Logorama, The Comeback Trail, Vanquish, and Lansky. On television, Michaely has appeared in Unhappily Ever After, Sabrina the Teenage Witch and Popular. He produced the 2005 film The Quiet, is the executive producer of Farewell Amor and executive producer of Wild Indian which premiered at the 2021 Sundance Film Festival.

== Selected filmography ==
- Can't Hardly Wait (1998) as Geoff, X-Phile No. 1
- But I'm a Cheerleader (1999) as Joel Goldberg
- Ghost World (2001) as Porno Cashier
- The Rules of Attraction (2002) as Raymond
- Wonderland (2003) as Bruce (scenes deleted)
- Kiss Kiss Bang Bang (2005) as Eugene
- Cruel World (2005) as Jack
- Factory Girl (2006) as Joey
- The Still Life (2006) as Robert
- Itty Bitty Titty Committee (2007) as Peter
- Logorama (2009) as Big Boy, Jolly Green Giant, Mr. Clean (voice)
- I Am Michael (2015) as co-producer
- Carrie Pilby (2016) as George
- Farewell Amor (2020) as Aubrey
- Run Hide Fight (2020) as Mr. Yates
- The Comeback Trail (2020) as Andre
- You Are My Home (2020) as Charlie
- Love-40 (2020) as Anthony
- Wild Indian (2021) as Jonathan
- Me You Madness (2021) as Pat
- Vanquish (2021) as Rayo
- Lansky (2021) as Jimmy the Bookie
- The Card Counter (2021) as Ronnie
- Bittersweet (2021) as Spinoza
- Mutt (2023) as producer
- The Re-Education of Molly Singer (2023) as Scott Perkins
- Saint Clare (2024) as producer
- Saurus City (2025) as producer
