= Why Pay More? =

2015 studio album by The Soft Pink Truth

Studio album by The Soft Pink Truth
- Released: 2015

The Soft Pink Truth chronology
Why Do the Heathen Rage? (2014)	Why Pay More? (2015)	Shall We Go on Sinning So That Grace May Increase? (2020)

Why Pay More? is a studio album from American electronic music act The Soft Pink Truth, released in 2015. The album was released on a pay-what-you-want model with a Creative Commons license allowing the music to be shared without restriction for non-commercial purposes. The work is based on found sound audio from YouTube uploads and has received positive critical reception.

== Critical reception ==
In Now, Benjamin Boles wrote that this album is "less conceptually heavy but also more overtly joyful and danceable" than previous releases from The Soft Pink Truth, summing up that "it’s refreshing to hear experimental dance music maintain such a strong sense of humour and fun". Randall Roberts of The Los Angeles Times wrote that this album "harnesses [Daniels'] skill in service of house music" and calls the work "awesome". Zoe Camp of Pitchfork Media gave Why Pay More? a seven out of 10, noting that the experimental nature of the music can be "more overwhelming than engaging" but adding that sensory overload is part of the album's purpose.

== Track listing ==
1. "Are You Looking?" – 5:16
2. "Acapella" – 5:08
3. "Awesome" – 2:55
4. "Party Pills" – 5:45
5. "Why Pay More?" – 4:20
6. "What's a Computer?" – 5:10
7. "I Love Your Ass" – 5:09
8. "Fire Island of the Mind" – 6:41

== Personnel ==
- Drew Daniel – sampling, sequencing, editing, processing, mixing
- Jeff Carey – mastering
- M. C. Schmidt – bass guitar on “Fire Island of the Mind”
