= Blectum from Blechdom =

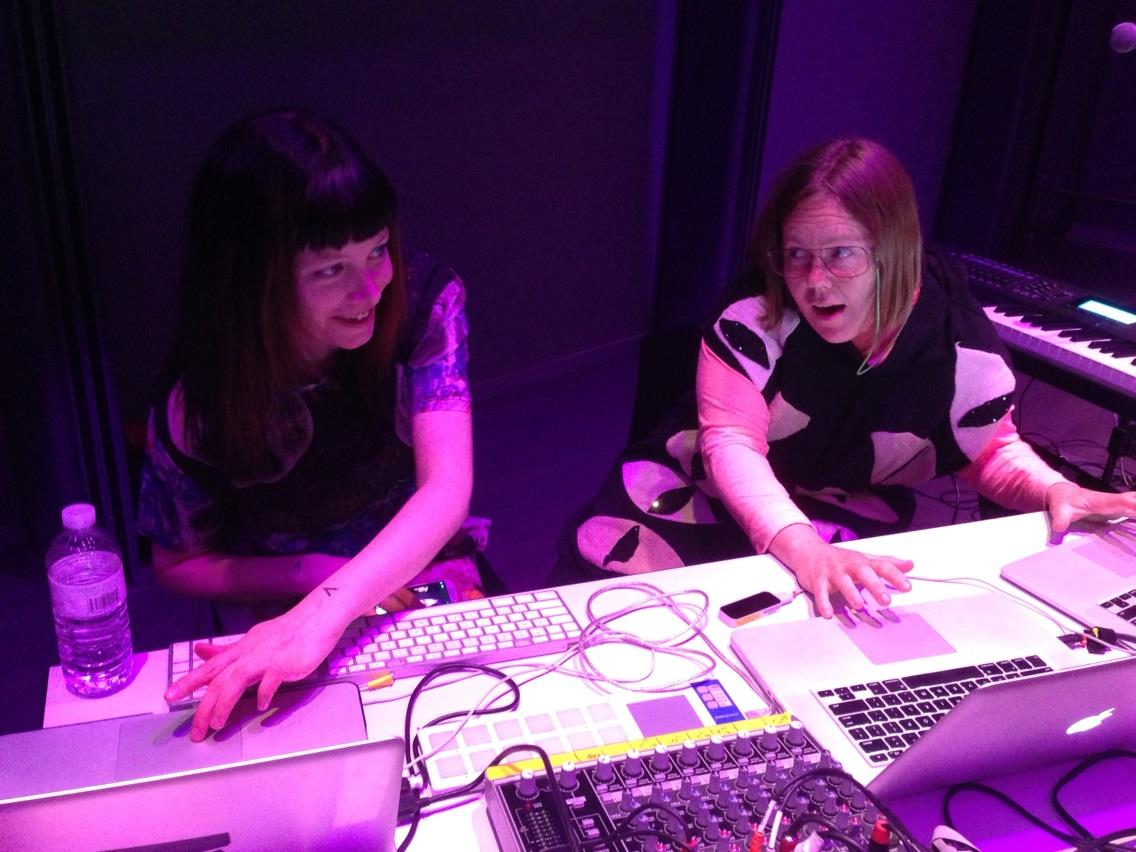
- BFB live in Providence RI

Background information
- Origin: Oakland, California
- Years active: 1998–2001, 2007-present
- Labels: Orthlorng Musork, Deluxe Records, Dial(), Tigerbeat6

Blectum from Blechdom is an electronic music duo, formed in 1998 by Kristin Erickson (Kevin Blechdom) and Bevin Kelley (Blevin Blectum). Erickson and Kelley met at Mills College in Oakland, California. They initially performed locally, in the San Francisco Bay Area and recorded their first EP, titled Snauses and Mallards, in March 2000, followed by their first full-length album The Messy Jesse Fiesta (that won second prize for Digital Musics at Ars Electronica in 2001) later that year. Both artists retain their pen names when working on solo projects.

Their music has been described as exceptionally irreverent and humorous and though experimental in nature, with heavy glitch influences, never pretentious and always rhythmic.

== Discography ==
- Snauses and Mallards (2000)
- The Messy Jesse Fiesta (2000)
- Bad Music and Buttprints (2000)
- De Snaunted Haus (2000)
- Haus de Snaus (2001)
- Fishin' In Front Of People: The Early Years 1998-2000 (2002)
- DeepBone (2021)
