= Seán Hillen =

Irish artist (born 1961)

Seán Hillen born 1961, in Ireland, is an artist whose work includes collages, photography and the creative use of photographs.

== Early life ==
Seán Hillen was born in Newry, a border town on the Republic of Ireland–United Kingdom border in County Down, Northern Ireland in 1961. Hillen grew up during the Troubles, which he described as "utter chaos". When he was a teenager his parents bought him his first camera to encourage his interest in photography and prevent him from being drawn into the conflict. Hillen studied at the Belfast College of Art. In 1982, he travelled to London to continue his studies at the London College of Printing, and then at the Slade School of Fine Art.

== Troubles era works ==
Hillen traveled back and forth between Northern Ireland and England over the course of several years and began using his camera to document the conflict in Northern Ireland. Realising that print media was already saturated with images of The Troubles he began to incorporate his own photographs into photomontage work, juxtaposing his monochrome photos with collected imagery from religious pamphlets, London tourist postcards and toy packaging. Collage works from this era include Four Ideas for a New Town, #1 and Trouble in Paradise #1. Many of these photomontages have lengthy, wry titles such as Sr. Faustina Appears In LondonNewry, Miraculously Preventing The Illegal Photography Of Members Of The Security Forces...

Throughout the 1990s Hillen found it increasingly difficult to get his works into exhibitions and galleries, which he suspects was due to anxieties surrounding the Northern Ireland peace process. However, they are now considered to be valuable commentaries on the war in Northern Ireland and several have been acquired for the collections of the Imperial War Museum in London. One of Hillen's collages features as a frontispiece in Art from Contemporary Conflict by Sara Bevan published by the Imperial War Museum in 2015.

Hillen's Troubles era photographs have also been evaluated in their own right as important social documentation of the conflict, and of Northern Irish society as a whole. Frank Miller, writing for The Irish Times, noted that his photos captured events and even more importantly, non events, and that Hillen's unique approach was that of "an insider and also an outsider". In 2011 the National Library of Ireland Photographic Archive acquired negatives and scans of 530 of Hillen's Troubles era 35mm photographs, which are now held permanently as The Seán Hillen Collection. A selection of these were exhibited at the National Photographic Archive's exhibition space in Dublin as part of PhotoIreland Festival 2012.

In 2013 a collection of these photographs were published as a book, Melancholy Witness. The title comes from a quote by poet Seamus Heaney on Hillen's work; "The photographs are like black and white time machines that bring back the desolation and danger of the Troubles. The images have a documentary accuracy, but it is the aura of melancholy witness that marks them as the work of Sean Hillen."

== Irelantis ==
In 1993 Hillen returned to Ireland from London, and settled in Dublin. Between 1994 and 1997, he created a new body of work entitled Irelantis, which became his best known photomontage series. The Irelantis series is a collection of scalpel-and-glue collages. In them Hillen creates surreal hybrid images combining ancient monuments like the Giza pyramid complex with nostalgic idealistic scenes of Ireland from tourist postcards by John Hinde. Hillen illustrates places such as the Cliffs of Moher, Newgrange, Trinity College and O'Connell Street.

== Other works ==
Hillen has worked in other media and art forms, including sculpture, video, illustration, performance, stage and graphic design. His later activities include photo series such as the ongoing Untitled Broken Umbrella Project, which consists of hundreds of photos of broken umbrellas around Dublin.

In 2007 Hillen won, with landscape architect Desmond Fitzgerald, the design competition for an Omagh bomb Memorial. He lives and works in Dublin.

His works are held in many public and private collections including the Irish State Collection, the Imperial War Museum, the European Central Bank, the Irish Central Bank, Citigroup, the BBC and Microsoft.
