= Blevin Blectum =

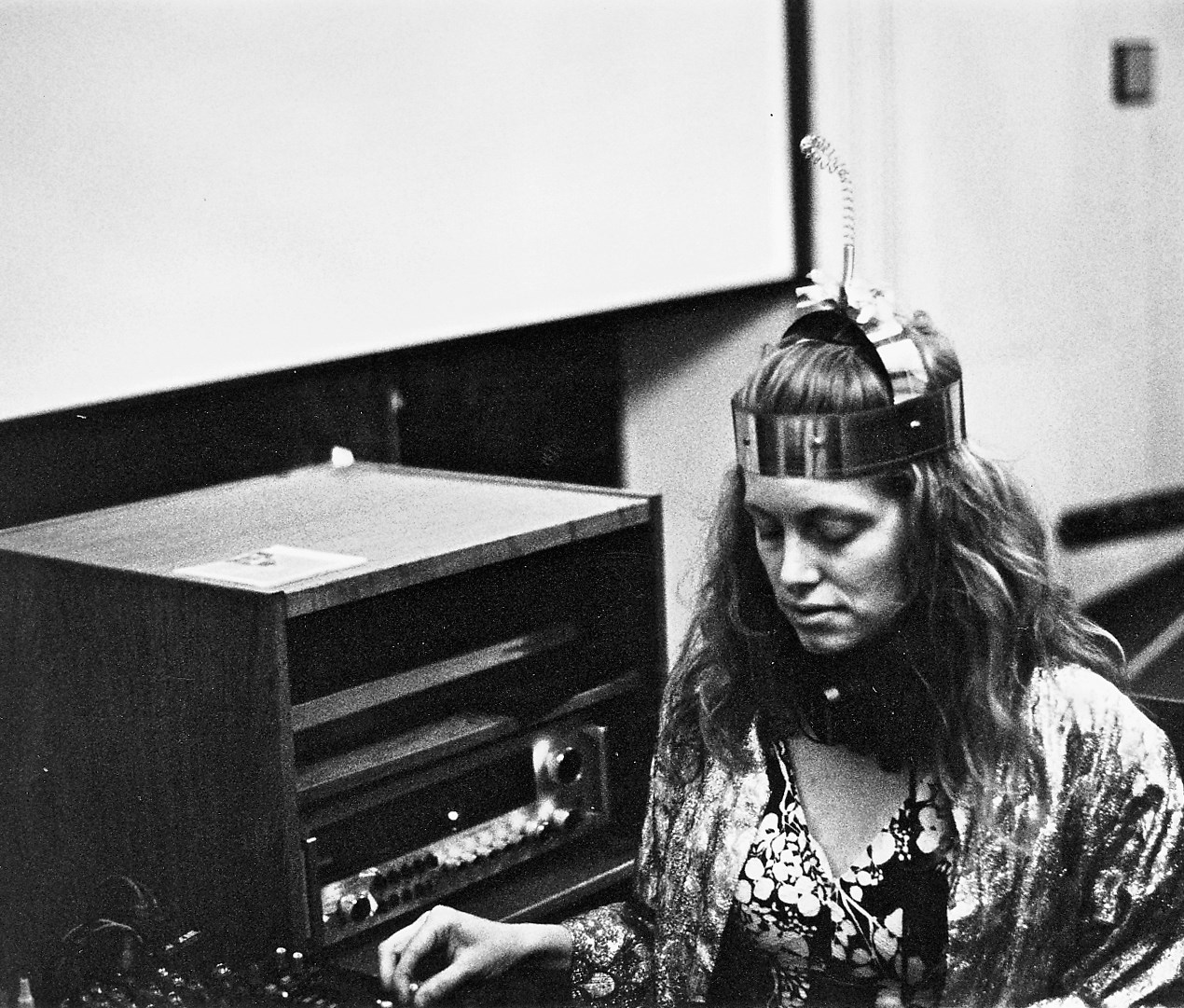
- Blevin Blectum at the Mills College concert in 1999.

Background information
- Also known as: D84, Synopterus
- Born: Bevin Kelley; 1971 (age 54–55)
- Genres: Electronic
- Years active: 1998 – present
- Labels: Deluxe; Bleakhouse; Aagoo Records; Estuary Ltd.; Deathbomb Arc
- Member of: Blectum from Blechdom
- Formerly of: Sagan (band)
- Website: http://www.blevinblectum.com/

Blevin Blectum (born Bevin Kelley) is an American electronic musician and multimedia composer. She is celebrated as an "icon of deviant and cerebral electronic music". Otherwise known as Bevin Kelley, she has been active in the US electronic avant garde since the 1990s. She's best known as one half of irreverent rhythmic glitch duo Blectum From Blechdom and multimedia band Sagan with J Lesser, Ryan Junell and Wobbly.

== Early life and education ==
She was born Bevin Kelley in 1971. Her younger brother is musician Kelley Polar and her cousin is musician Rayna Russom. Blectum studied the violin during her youth.

At Oberlin College she began making electronic music at the WOBC-FM studios. At Mills College, she partnered with Kevin Blechdom to form Blectum from Blechdom, an electronica and performance art duo. In 2001, Blectum from Blechdom won an Award of Distinction for digital music at the Prix Ars Electronica.

In May 2014, she graduated with a PhD in Computer Music and Multimedia from Brown University's Multimedia and Electronic Music Experiments (MEME) department. Her dissertation committee included writer Brian Evenson and playwright Erik Ehn. While at Brown University she created sound and music for several of playwright Theo Goodell's works.

== Career ==
Blectum has released many solo albums, and released a CD/DVD Unseen Forces on Matmos's Vague Terrain label as part of multimedia band Sagan with J Lesser, video producer Ryan Junell, and Wobbly. In 1998 she worked at Orban testing radio processing units, in 1999 worked at Thomas Dolby's Headspace and Beatnik Inc. as a beta-tester, and in 2000 to 2004 worked as a sound designer at LeapFrog Enterprises and several smaller sound design companies in the San Francisco Bay Area.

She has commonly worked with the software Ableton Live, Pro Tools, Max/MSP/Jitter, Apogee Duet.

An avid bird enthusiast, Blectum quit music for several years and worked as a registered veterinary technician at the Medical Center for Birds in Northern California, before moving to Providence, Rhode Island in 2007.

In 2013, she co-founded theatrical-electro-acoustic-chamber-ensemble The Traveling Bubble Ensemble with Michael Kelley, Elise Kuder, and Marjorie Gere.

In 2011 she was artist-in-residence at WORM, a Rotterdam-based institute for avant-garde music and art.

Her fifth solo LP/CD, Emblem Album, was released on Aagoo records on December 5, 2013.

In November 2017 she released All Day I Dream About Singularity (vinyl and download) under the name Synopterus, on Darling Dada (Paris).

Late 2020 saw the release of a remix track + video, for composer Kirsten Volness's album 'River Rising'. Music by Blevin Blectum, video by Alex P Dupuis.

In 2021 she resides in Seattle, working by day as Senior UX Sound Designer for Echo Alexa Devices, and continues to perform and release music. A new solo record as well as Blectum from Blechdom ('Deep Bone') and Sagan ('Anti-Ark' on the Hausu label) albums will be released later this year.

On 2023's OMNII, "Kelley has tempered her zanier inclinations and focused on the most sonorous and wonder-filled tones and otherworldly atmospheres of her career. It's a shame that Cosmos went off the air, as these tracks would make for an ideal soundtrack."

Multitudes Of Venom is Kelley's sixth album released under her Blevin Blectum alias, the second to drop on equally eccentric Los Angeles label Deathbomb Arc. Multitudes Of Venom "features a live recording of a performance on Stanford’s KZSU radio, billed as a presentation of music from 2023’s Omnii, but you wouldn’t know from listening to it. Instead, Multitudes Of Venom features a heady collision of samples, signals and loops that speed and scramble across a universe of sonic possibility."

== Personal life ==
Blectum is a science fiction enthusiast.

== Discography ==
=== Blevin Blectum ===
- Talon Slalom (album) (2002)
- Magic Maple (album) (2004)
- The Rapid Cooling EP (EP) (2007)
- Gular Flutter (album) (2008)
- Emblem Album (album) (2013)
- Irradiance (2014 Blevin Blectum album) (2014)
- OMNII (album) (2023)
- Multitudes of Venom (album) (2024)

=== with Blectum from Blechdom ===
- The Messy Jesse Fiesta (album) (2000)
- Snauses And Mallards (EP) (2000)
- Bad Music And Buttprints (EP) (2000)
- De Snaunted Haus (EP) (2000)
- Haus De Snaus (album) (2001)
- Fishin' In Front Of People: The Early Years 1998-2000 (album) (2002)
- Deep Bone (album) (2021)

=== with Sagan ===
- Unseen Forces (album) (2004)
- Resting Pleasures (7") (2006)
- Anti-Ark (album) (2021)

=== as D84 ===
- Pirate Planets (1998)

=== as Synopterus ===
- All Day I Dream About Singularity (2017)
