= J Lesser =

- Also known as: Lesser
- Born: Jason Doerck; December 19, 1970 (age 55); California, USA
- Genres: Electronica; Glitch; Drum and bass IDM
- Occupation: Producer
- Years active: 1990–October 2015
- Labels: Matador Records; Tigerbeat6; Vinyl Communications
- Website: Official website

Jason Doerck (born December 19, 1970), known by the stage name J Lesser, is an American electronic music producer. Between 2003 and 2006, he was a member of the laptop group Sagan, alongside Blevin Blectum, Wobbly, and video artist Ryan Junell.

== Early life ==
Doerck was born and raised in various parts of California, including Willits and San Diego. He began his music career playing bass guitar in black metal and punk groups, including a Metallica cover band. In 1997, he helped form the group Disc with Kid606, M.C. Schmidt and Drew Daniel (of Matmos).

== Electronic music career ==
His interest in electronic music led him to work with record label Vinyl Communications in 1992. Doerck settled in the San Francisco Bay Area in 1994, where he participated in the drum & bass scene. He toured with A Minor Forest, and later collaborated with Kid606, publishing a number of records on the label Tigerbeat6. Doerck also played with members of Crash Worship. His early electronic music influences included Luke Vibert's work released under the alias Plug, which Doerck has admitted he was trying to imitate.

In 2001, Doerck became a live touring member of Matmos when they toured as the opening act for Björk on the Vespertine tour, in addition to playing as supporting musicians in her band. During the same year, his album Gearhound won an Honorable Mention for Digital Musics in the Prix Ars Electronica.

In 2004, Doerck remixed "Who Is It" from Björk's Medúlla album.

== Discography ==
- I Hate Me (Cassette, 1990)
- Split 7" with bigblackMariah (Hate Posse Records, 1991)
- VC-39 (Vinyl Communications, 1992)
- I Hate Me (Endless Records, 1993)
- The 1995 Lesser / Rob Crow Split CD (Vinyl Communications, 1995)
- Excommunicate The Cult Of The Live Band (Vinyl Communications, 1996)
- Welcome To The American Experience (Vinyl Communications, 1997)
- Gigolo Cop (Vinyl Communications, 1997)
- Elements of Pessimism, vol.1 (Box Theory Records, 1998)
- Lesser / Kid606 Split CD (Vinyl Communications, 1998)
- Gearhound (Matador Europe, 2001)
- MENSA Dance Squad (Tigerbeat6, 2001)
- LS-MP3CD-R (Tigerbeat6, 2002)
- Suppressive Acts: I-X (Matador Europe, 2003)
