= Plastic soul =

Pejorative term for inauthentic soul music

Plastic soul is a stylized form of soul music produced largely by white pop artists in the 1970s and 1980s, marked by deliberate imitation and an openly synthetic character.

== Usages ==
Paul McCartney referenced the phrase as the name of the Beatles 1965 album Rubber Soul, which was inspired by the term "plastic soul". In a studio conversation taped in June 1965 after recording the first take of "I'm Down", McCartney says "Plastic soul, man. Plastic soul".

== Popularity ==
David Bowie also described his own funky, soulful songs released in the early to mid-1970s as "plastic soul". These singles sold well, and Bowie became one of the few white music artists to be invited to perform on Soul Train. In a 1976 Playboy interview, Bowie described his recent album Young Americans as "the definitive plastic soul record. It's the squashed remains of ethnic music as it survives in the age of Muzak, written and sung by a white limey." Bowie's most commercially successful album, Let's Dance, released in 1983, has also been described as "plastic soul".

== See also ==
- Selling out
- Commercialism
- Artistic integrity
- Landfill indie
