= Acetone (band) =

American alternative rock band

- Origin: Los Angeles, California
- Genre: Alternative rock
- Years active: 1992–2001
- Labels: Vernon Yard; Virgin; Vapor
- Past members: Richie Lee; Mark Lightcap; Steve Hadley

Acetone were an American alternative rock band formed in 1992 in Los Angeles from the three core members of the group Spinout, formed in 1987. The group consisted of Mark Lightcap on guitar, Richie Lee on bass and Steve Hadley on drums. It disbanded after Lee's suicide on July 23, 2001, aged 34. While the group didn't receive much commercial success, they received strong critical attention and developed a loyal cult following throughout the years.

The group's influences included the Beach Boys, Gram Parsons and the Velvet Underground. Establishing themselves as an alternative rock group, they incorporated genres ranging from neo-psychedelia to roots rock and country into their music. Acetone has performed on few occasions since Lee's death, most notably with Mazzy Star's lead singer Hope Sandoval in 2017.

In 2023, New West Records released a comprehensive 11 LP box set that contains the band's entire discography, making some of the out-of-print recordings available again for the first time in years. In the accompanying book, Drew Daniel of Matmos retraces Acetone's trajectory and British musician J Spaceman (Spaceman 3, Spiritualized) describes his relation to the musicians, further emphasizing Acetone's status as a band highly esteemed by their peers. The re-release rekindled the interest in Acetone, both in their own right as "clearly underappreciated talent (...) enshrined in the history of alternative music" as well as a case example for "one of many swept up in the post-Nirvana gold rush and signed for a huge advance, only for them to later fade into a distant memory, a spectre of unfulfilled potential."

== Members activity outside of Acetone ==
Hadley and Lightcap formed The Ecstasy of Gold in 2012, releasing their first album Vol. 1 October 6, 2022.

One of Lightcap's endeavors was the Dick Slessig Combo, with himself on guitar, bassist Carl Bronson, and drummer Steve Goodfriend, formerly of the band Radar Brothers. Lightcap's credits include electronic duo Matmos' albums The West (1999), A Chance to Cut Is a Chance to Cure (2001), The Civil War (2003), and The Rose Has Teeth in the Mouth of a Beast (2006), performing electric, slide and acoustic guitar, ukulele, banjo, tuba, trumpet, bass trumpet, plastic tube, and peck horn.

== Band members ==
- Richie Lee – bass guitar, vocals
- Mark Lightcap – guitar, vocals
- Steve Hadley – drums

== Discography ==
Studio albums

- Cindy (Vernon Yard, 1993)
- If You Only Knew (Vernon Yard, 1996)
- Acetone (Vapor, 1997)
- York Blvd. (Vapor, 2001)

Compilations

- Acetone 1992–2001 (Light in the Attic, 2017)
- I'm Still Waiting (New West, 2023)

EPs

- Acetone (Vernon Yard, 1993)
- I Guess I Would (Vernon Yard, 1995)
