= S.T.H. =

American gay pornography magazine

- S.T.H. #68 (2017), featuring Johnny Hazzard
- Editor: Boyd McDonald (1973–1980s); Victor Weaver (1980s–1989); Billy Miller (1989–present)
- Categories: Gay pornography, erotic non-fiction
- Frequency: Irregular
- Founder: Boyd McDonald
- Founded: c. 1973
- Country: United States
- Based in: New York City
- Website: www.straight-to-hell.com
- ISSN: 2473-4608

S.T.H. (an acronym for Straight to Hell), also known as The Manhattan Review of Unnatural Acts, is an American gay pornography and erotic non-fiction zine founded by Boyd McDonald. It publishes autobiographical stories of male-male sexual encounters, as submitted by the magazine's readership. First published in the early 1970s, S.T.H. became an influential publication in New York City's arts and culture spheres, and counted notable literary figures such as William S. Burroughs, Allen Ginsberg, and Gore Vidal among its readership.

== History ==
The precise date of S.T.H.'s founding is unknown; the earliest known issue is #2, dated 1973. Publication is irregular, and early issues were not always dated nor copyrighted. (Note: Scholars have inferred approximate dates of undated issues from advertisements or news items mentioned; for example, issue 53 contains an advertisement for the S.T.H. anthology Cum: True Homosexual Experiences from S.T.H. Writers, making its publication date roughly 1983.) The magazine was founded by Boyd McDonald, who edited the magazine from the early seventies through the mid-eighties. McDonald created S.T.H. as a magazine of reader-submitted male-male sex stories following his experience creating Skinheads, a zine about foreskin fetishism. He claimed to have been inspired to create the magazine after being visited by Gore Vidal's character Myra Breckenridge in a dream.

McDonald edited, typeset, mimeographed, and hand-assembled early issues of S.T.H. from a series of transient furnished rooms on the Upper West Side in Manhattan. Printing costs were paid with McDonald's welfare checks, and McDonald once joked that S.T.H. "was the only gay-sex magazine funded by the US government." At its peak, the magazine had a circulation of twenty thousand, which provided McDonald a modest income that he spent on male escorts.

McDonald turned over editorship of S.T.H. to Victor Weaver in the mid-1980s, and began focusing on publishing a series of anthologies that collected stories from the magazine (see Anthologies below); Meat, the first volume in the series, sold over 50,000 copies. Weaver was more readily accepting of S.T.H.'s popularity in New York's arts and culture scene, and threw parties for the magazine at venues such as Danceteria and the Pyramid Club. Billy Miller became editor of S.T.H. in 1989, and in 2007 began a project to digitize back issues of the magazine. S.T.H. #68, the most recent issue of the magazine, was published in 2017 and edited by Miller.

== Content ==
S.T.H. consists primarily of readers' submissions of stories of their sexual experiences. Submissions are edited only for length, with spelling and grammar errors intentionally left uncorrected; McDonald stated that "I find men who don't use punctuation are more fun in bed than those who do." McDonald encouraged contributors to read Ernest Hemingway and William S. Burroughs, and emulate their direct and unadorned writing style. He would often correspond with contributors, asking them detailed questions about their sexual habits and printing their answers. (Note: Sample questions include "Do you smell your clothes when you undress?" "Do you smell your asshole on your fingers?" "Did you make full use of the sexual allure of your boyhood?" "When you cum, how many squirts does it take?" "Did you [a stripper] toss your underpants to the men watching?" "Did any of them become so inspired by your act that they had sex [in the bar]?") Stories were printed under titles that parodied tabloid newspaper headlines and TV listings guides, such as "10 Hawaiian Dongs Unload on Tourist" and "Mechanic’s Asshole Is Clean; Has Fragrance of Gasoline".

The magazine also published pornographic images, both reader-contributed and sourced from studios such as Old Reliable and the Athletic Model Guild. Issues published under McDonald's editorship also contained his commentary on sex, culture, and politics, particularly what he perceived as the hypocrisies of individuals and celebrities who were not fully accepting of their own desires.

=== Subtitles ===
Though S.T.H. is most commonly subtitled as The Manhattan Review of Unnatural Acts, the magazine is published under an ever-changing variety of subtitles, several of which parody the titles of other publications or reference other works:

- New York Review of Unnatural Acts
- U.S. Chronicle of Crimes Against Nature
- The American Journal of Dick Licking
- New York Review of Cocksucking (New York Review of Books)
- The Manhattan Review of Cocksucking
- American Journal of Cocksucking and Current Affairs
- Archives of the American Academy of Homosexual Research
- The North American Horndog Reader
- New Amsterdam Journal of Trade
- The Manatus Raunch Gazette
- The Urania Spurting Times
- Feeled and Creemed
- Splorch Illustrated (Sports Illustrated)
- The Official Organ of The Great East Ball Lickers Union – Local 6942
- W.H.O.R.E. International
- The Society for the Preservation of Quality Blow Jobs (Society for the Preservation of New England Antiquities)
- American Journal of Debauchery: Revenge Therapy
- Sperm Wars (Star Wars)
- The Rimmer's Digest (Reader's Digest)
- The Saturday Evening Ass-Licker (Saturday Evening Post)

== Legacy and impact ==
Through the sheer abundance of true stories, McDonald presents a picture of homosexual sex as a nearly universal male experience, in pointed contrast to the contemporary ideology of homosexuality as special identity. In the world of the S.T.H. book, every barracks shower is an orgy room; every Boy Scout jamboree is a festival of sexual initiation; every conservative politician and clergyman pays male hustlers for sex. Everything men do to bond or compete in sports, war and politics is a sublimation of, if not a substitute for, homosexual desire.

— Bernard Welt, Mythomania: Fantasies, Fables and Sheer Lies in Contemporary American Popular Culture

McDonald described S.T.H. as both an artistic endeavor and a work of research, and spoke of its importance in documenting the lives of gay men in a period from the 1940s to the 1980s that he described as the "Golden Age of American Cocksucking". He described the magazine as being "not for the upward striving middle class but for guys who like to go down"; Bernard Welt argues that the S.T.H. represented McDonald's desire to replace pornography with smut, which McDonald saw as "sex that is truthful, idiosyncratic, and honest even about its own reason for being." Christopher Castiglia and Christopher Reed of Pennsylvania State University identify S.T.H., along with the journals Fag Rag and Heresies, as pioneering "a 'zine culture produced by and for queers."

S.T.H. counted multiple luminaries in arts and literature among its readership, consequently earning the nickname "the cumrag of the stars" from its editors. Notable readers include William S. Burroughs, Allen Ginsberg, Christopher Isherwood, Tennessee Williams, Robert Mapplethorpe, Larry Mitchell, David Sedaris, John Mitzel, and Gore Vidal, with Vidal once describing the magazine as "one of the best radical papers in the country." Parties organized by S.T.H. were attended by John Waters, Fran Lebowitz, Kenneth Anger, Quentin Crisp, Taylor Mead, Cookie Mueller and Jackie Curtis. Felice Picano cited S.T.H. as a prominent gay publication in the 1970s and 80s. Conversely, John Preston was a critic of S.T.H., calling its readership "dirty", "filthy", "sick", "kinky", and "twisted".

In 2008, the Berlin-based art gallery Exile hosted "Straight To Hell presents: In Cock We Trust", an exhibition of S.T.H. material. In 2010, the White Cubicle Toilet Gallery in London hosted "Straight to Hell at White Cubicle: An Installation by Jan Wandrag".

== Anthologies ==
- Meat: How Men Look, Act, Walk, Talk, Dress, Undress, Taste & Smell – True Homosexual Experiences from Straight To Hell. Gay Sunshine Press. 1980. ISBN 9780917342783.
- Flesh: True Homosexual Experiences from S.T.H. Vol. 2. Gay Sunshine Press. 1982. ISBN 0917342917.
- Sex: True Homosexual Experiences from S.T.H. Writers. Vol. 3. Gay Sunshine Press. 1983. ISBN 0917342984.
- Cum: True Homosexual Experiences from S.T.H. Writers. Vol. 4. Gay Sunshine Press. 1984. ISBN 0917342356.
- Juice: True Homosexual Experiences from S.T.H. Writers. Vol. 5. Gay Sunshine Press. 1984. ISBN 0917342364.
- Smut: An S.T.H. Chap-Book – True Homosexual Experiences from S.T.H. Writers. Vol. 5 (sic). Gay Presses of New York. 1985. ISBN 0960472487.
- Wads: True Homosexual Experiences from S.T.H. Writers. Vol. 6. Gay Sunshine Press. 1985. ISBN 0917342119.
- Cream: True Homosexual Experiences from S.T.H. Writers. Vol. 7 (1 ed.). Gay Sunshine Press. 1986. ISBN 0917342194.
  - Cream: True Homosexual Experiences from S.T.H. Writers. Vol. 7 (2 ed.). Leyland Publications. 1996. ISBN 094359555X.
- Filth: An S.T.H. Chap-Book – True Homosexual Experiences from S.T.H. Writers. Gay Presses of New York. 1987. ISBN 0914017098.
- Skin: Homosexual Experiences in the Classical Period, 1940–1980. Bright Tyger Press. 1988. ISBN 0944378005.
- Raunch, True Homosexual Experiences – An S.T.H. Chapbook. Vol. 11. Fidelity Publishing. 1990. ISBN 0962555800.
- Lewd: True Homosexual Experiences – An S.T.H. Chapbook. Vol. 12. Fidelity Publishing. 1992. ISBN 0962555819.
- Scum: True Homosexual Experiences– An S.T.H. Chapbook. Vol. 13. Fidelity Publishing. 1993. ISBN 0962555827.

Note: There are 13 volumes in this series of anthologies. When originally published, the first in the sequence of publication had no volume number. The sixth in sequence of publication was erroneously marked volume 5 duplicating that volume number. The next two were marked volume 6 and volume 7, but were actually 7th and 8th in sequence of publication and the next two after that had no volume designation but were 9th and 10th in publication sequence. The final three volumes were marked volume 11, volume 12, and volume 13 matching publication sequence.

== Bibliography ==
- Jones, William E. (2016). True Homosexual Experiences: Boyd McDonald and Straight to Hell. We Heard You Like Books. ISBN 978-0996421812.
- McDonald, Boyd; Leyland, Winston, eds. (1994). Meat: True Homosexual Experiences from S.T.H. Gay Sunshine Press. ISBN 9780917342783.
- Welt, Bernard (1996). Mythomania: Fantasies, Fables and Sheer Lies in Contemporary American Popular Culture. Art Issues Press. pp. 58–62. ISBN 9780963726438.
- Woodhouse, Reed (1998). Unlimited Embrace: A Canon of Gay Fiction, 1945–1995. University of Massachusetts Press. ISBN 1558491325.
