= Boyd McDonald =

Boyd McDonald may refer to:

- Boyd McDonald (composer) (born 1932), Canadian pianist and composer
- Boyd McDonald (pornographer) (1925–1993), editor and publisher of the homosexual zine Straight to Hell
