= Bogusław Schaeffer =

Polish composer, musicologist, and graphic artist (1929–2019)

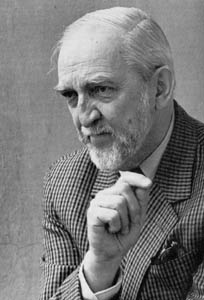
Bogusław Schaeffer

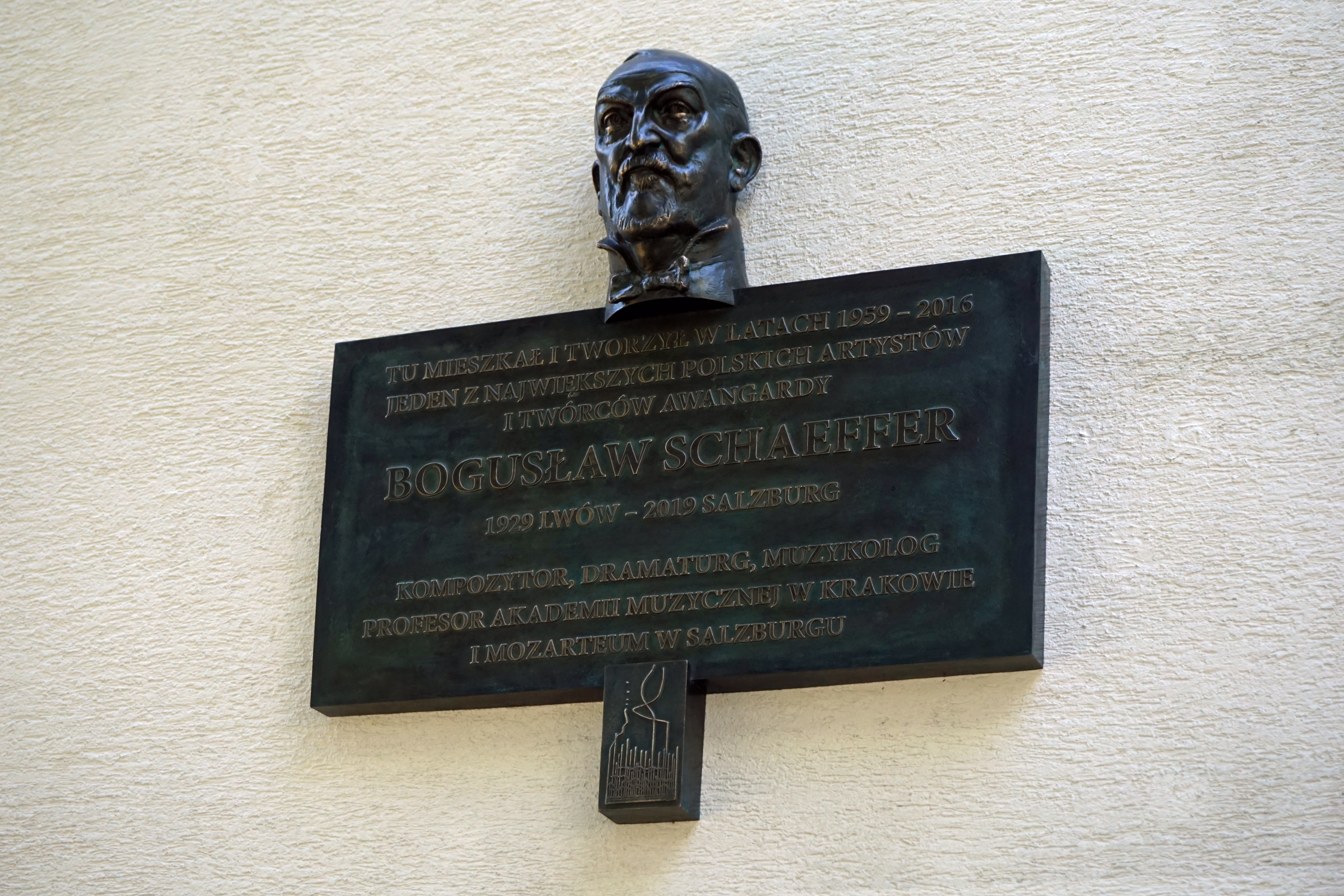
Commemorative plaque on the apartment block Osiedle Kolorowe 4, where the artist lived and worked. Unveiled in 2025.

Bogusław Julian Schaeffer (also Schäffer) (6 June 1929 – 1 July 2019) was a Polish composer, musicologist, and graphic artist, a member of the avant-garde "Cracow Group" of Polish composers alongside Krzysztof Penderecki and others.

Schaeffer was born in Lwów (now Lviv, Ukraine). After studying violin in Opole and graduating with a degree in musical composition under Zdzisław Jachimecki in 1953 at the Academy of Music in Kraków, he became an active composer and musical theoretician. From 1963, he was a lecturer on composition at the Kraków Academy, and he was a professor at the Hochschule für Musik in Salzburg from the mid-1980s to 2000.

Konstancja Kochaniec and Adam Walaciński were among his students.

Schaeffer's 'Klavierkonzert' was used on the soundtrack of David Lynch's 2006 film Inland Empire. "Solo", a documentary about Schaeffer was released in 2008.

In 2022, American electronic music duo Matmos released an album dedicated to the composer.

== Awards ==
- 1959 - 2nd Prize at the Grzegorz Fitelberg Competition in Katowice for Monosonata for 24 solos string instruments
- 1962 - Prize at the Artur Malawski Competition in Kraków for Musica ipsa
- 1964 - 2nd Prize at the Fitelberg Competition for Little Symphony
- 2007 - Grand cultural award of the province of Salzburg

== Most significant works ==
=== Books ===
- New Music. Problems in Contemporary Composing techniques (Nowa Muzyka) - 1958
- Introduction to Composition (1974)

=== Musical works ===
==== Orchestral works ====
- Quattro Movimenti for piano and orchestra - 1957
- Topofonica for 40 different instruments - 1960
- Musica ipsa for orchestra - 1962
- Music for MI for vibraphone and orchestra - 1963
- Collage and Form for 8 jazz musician and orchestra - 1963
- Collage for orchestra - 1964
- Text for orchestra - 1971
- Warsaw Overture for orchestra - 1975
- Stabat Mater for sopran, alt, string orchestra and orgeln - 1983
- Missa Sinfonica for orchestra - 1986

==== Concertante ====
- 4 Movimenti for piano and chamber orchestra - 1957
- Concerto Breve for cello and orchestra - 1959
- Concerto for flute, flute trio and orchestra - 1963
- Violin Concerto - 1963
- Piano Concerto II for piano and orchestra - 1967
- Jazz Concerto for 12 musicians and orchestra - 1969
- Concerto for 3 pianos - 1972
- Concerto for guitar and orchestra - 1984
- Concerto for 2 piano 4 hands and orchestra - 1988
- Violin Concerto II - 1989
- Piano Concerto III for piano, orchestra and electronic media - 1990
- Concerto for Viola and Orchestra - 1997
- Piano Concerto IV for piano, orchestra and electronic media - 1999
- Violin Concerto III for violin and orchestra - 1999
- Violin Concerto IV for violinist with 3 violins and chamber orchestra - 2003
- Piano Concerto V for piano and 15 vocalists - 2004
- Piano Concerto VI for piano and 11 instruments (including accordion) - 2004
- Concerto for Viola and Chamber Orchestra - 2004
- Piano Concerto VII for piano and chamber orchestra - 2005
- Violin Concerto V for violin and female chorus - 2006

==== Chamber music ====
- Music for string quartet - 1954
- Permutations for 10 instruments - 1956
- String Quartet No.1 - 1957
- Extremes for 10 instruments - 1957
- Monosonate for 6 string quartets - 1946
- Lineare Construction for piano - 1959
- Kodes for chamber orchestra - 1961
- String Quartet No.2 - 1964
- Composition for harp and piano - 1966
- Estratto for string trio - 1971
- String Quartet No.3 - 1971
- Mare for piano and 9 instruments - 1971
- Negative Music for chosen instrument - 1972
- Free Form I for 5 instruments - 1972
- Iranian Set for flute, piano, 3 actors & ensemble of performers - 1976
- Minimal Art for tuba and piano - 1977
- Gravesono for wind instrument - 1977
- Self-expression for violoncello - 1978
- Kesukann for 13 string instruments - 1978
- Esatto e libero for violin and piano - 1983
- Mouhadatsa for viola and violoncello - 1985
- Kwaiwa for violin and computer - 1986
- Summer Music for accordion and piano - 1987
- Missa brevis for choir - 1988
- Spring Music for viola and piano - 1988
- Winter Music for horn and piano - 1988
- Love Moments - 1990
- Monophonie II for 13 violas - 1997
- Kreuzweg 11 for saxophone, accordion, percussion and viola - 2003
- Salzburg Spectres for 4 violas - 2005
- Quartet for 4 violas - 2006
- String Quartet No.17 - 2006

==== Solo works ====
- Sonate for violin solo - 1955
- Negative for flute solo - 1960
- Construction for vibraphone solo - 1962
- Project for tuba and tape - 1980
- Euterpe for oboe solo - 1984
- Sonata for viola solo - 1991
- Espedozione for trombone solo - 2000
- Per Violino Solo - 2002
- Raccontino for marimba solo - 2005

==== Keyboard works ====
- Sonatine - 1952
- Composition - 1954
- Model I-XXXIV - 1956-2006
- Described Emotions - 1966
- Sonate II for organ - 1985
- Sonate III-IV for organ - 1986
- Megasonata for piano - 1994
- Fantasia (24 movements) for organ - 2003
- Fantasie Impromptu for piano - 2004
- Grand Sonata for piano solo and electronic media - 2006

==== Opera ====
- Monodram, opera radiowa, 65' - 1968
- Liebesbliecke opera, 150' - 1990

== See also ==
- Regards/Ukłony dla Bogusław Schaeffer, 2022 experimental electronic album by Matmos sampled from Schaeffer's complete works
