= Boyd McDonald (pornographer) =

American writer and magazine publisher

Boyd MacDonald
- Born: 1925; South Dakota, U.S.
- Died: September 1993 (aged 67–68); Manhattan, New York City, New York, U.S.
- Resting place: Lake Preston Cemetery, Lake Preston, Kingsbury County, South Dakota, U.S.
- Education: B.A., Harvard University
- Occupations: Publisher of pornography and erotica
- Known for: S.T.H. (Straight to Hell)

Boyd McDonald (1925 – September 1993) was an American writer, editor, and publisher of the long-running gay pornography and erotic literature zine S.T.H., or Straight to Hell. He sometimes prefixed his name with the title of "Reverend," from a mail-order divinity degree he purchased.

== Life ==
=== Early life ===
McDonald was born in South Dakota in 1925. He attended Lake Preston, South Dakota High School, but did not graduate. Despite his lack of a high school diploma, he was admitted to Harvard University and given a small scholarship. He was soon drafted into the Army. After discharge from the Army he returned to Harvard (Eliot House) and earned a degree in American history and literature.

He said that "of all the benefits I got from Harvard, I am most grateful for the opportunity it gave me, albeit unwittingly, to come out fast and thoroughly." He frequently attended gay parties "that quickly turned into orgies;" his "first serious lover" was a straight football player he met at one such party.

Late in his life, McDonald stated "I feel homosexuality is a gift, an advantage." He explained that the main advantage of homosexuality was the opportunities it provided for sexual encounters with many men, which promiscuity he endorsed and celebrated. He believed all men wanted these sexual encounters, even if they would not admit it to themselves. He was as contemptuous of monogamous gay couples as of straight ones, and opposed so-called Castro clones who were "determined to take homosexuality out of the toilet" and "introduce their lovers to Mom and Dad." He had his greatest contempt for hypocrites, those engaging in gay sex while publicly defending heterosexual monogamy.

Homosexuality "was for McDonald an obsession, as he often said." He never spoke of sex as "fun" or "playful"; "he wanted to return to sex its raw, unpretty power.... As a lover of facts about sex, Boyd was necessarily a hater of respectability.... To him, in fact, 'there was no such thing as an open homosexual. There are people who are openly gay, which is something else again.'"

=== Writing career ===
After graduation, he worked as a writer for Time, Forbes, IBM, and for several Wall Street firms. He found the jobs to be "irredeemably corrupt," and the stress caused him to begin drinking. He credits abandoning his traditional career with "saving his life." He subsequently began to live as a transient, keeping personal possessions to a minimum.

In 1973, while living on welfare in an Upper West Side SRO (for years before his death he was living in "Riverside Studios" at 342 West 71st St.), he founded his long-running zine S.T.H. or Straight to Hell, which consisted primarily of readers' submissions of their sexual experiences, together with Boyd's sexual or political commentary and single male pictures, reader-sent or from studios such as Old Reliable or Athletic Model Guild (always credited). He also published a number of anthologies of reader-contributed true sex histories.

McDonald was friends with a number of other gay pornographers and pro-sexual figures, such as David Hurles and Kenneth Anger.

=== Later life and death ===
In later years, McDonald was diagnosed with a severe anxiety disorder, agoraphobia, and obsessive–compulsive disorder, and rarely left his home. In 1992, he wrote in Lewd that "as the years have gone by and it has become more difficult than it was in childhood to find men to molest me and perpetrate crimes against nature, I have come to love abusing myself more and more." In a 1981 interview with The Advocate, he boasted that "recently I jacked off almost continuously for five days—except for when I went out for food."

McDonald died in September 1993 as a result of a pneumococcal infection complicated by emphysema, two months after completing his final book, Scum. Much of his correspondence and papers were discarded by his relatives.

== Works ==
=== Cruising the Movies ===
McDonald reviewed films broadcast on commercial television for gay publications, primarily Christopher Street magazine as well as New York Native, Connection, and Philadelphia Gay News. His reviews typically focused on the physique and clothing (or lack thereof) of the male actors in each film, arguing that all other elements of film are "but a distraction from the main point of movies, the exhibition of beautiful and exceptional people." In 1985, his reviews were collected into the book Cruising the Movies: A Sexual Guide to 'Oldies' on TV, published by Gay Presses of New York.

Like S.T.H, Cruising "is not strictly about movies; it frequently uses them as an excuse for political, social, sexual, psychological, and autobiographical comments." Material deleted from an unspecified book at the request of Winston Leyland, owner of Gay Sunshine Press ("Cole Porter a cocksucker, Brooke Shields's and Tyrone Powers's [ sic ] shit-holes"), was restored in Cruising the Movies.

=== Other works ===
A variety of McDonald stories were reprinted in the "Sex Histories" section of Guidemag Magazine.

== Political positions ==
McDonald was opposed to the politics of Ronald and Nancy Reagan, stating that "beneath their misleading smiles, have hearts of pig iron, which finds expression these days in bullying the minorities, the poor, the sick, the hungry, the old, and, for all I know, the lame, the halt, and the blind."

McDonald celebrated and encouraged promiscuity, which he claimed was men's nature, stating that "all too often — in reading and in life — we look for sex and only find love; all too often we want a nice piece of meat or a nice hot suck hole and only find a wonderful human being."

== Legacy ==
Although primarily marketed and sold as pornography, McDonald saw his work as a kind of history of the homosexual experience. A Harvard graduate, McDonald compared his work favorably to the work of the great sex researchers, saying "Compared to Meat, Kinsey is just spam."

— Daniel Hendrickson

McDonald was mentioned as a prominent figure in the golden age of gay literature by Felice Picano, John Waters has also expressed his enthusiasm, and his picture (with Billy Miller) appears in issue 53. He is discussed at length by Reed Woodhouse in Unlimited Embrace: A Canon of Gay Fiction, 1945-1995. McDonald is the only non-fiction author Woodhouse deals with. Woodhouse describes S.T.H. as a "formative influence," noting that "Boyd McDonald was for me one of the keys to a grown-up, unashamed gay life, one who not only disentangled me from my own hypocritical knots, but showed me the hypocrisies in the world's mendacity about sex".

Gore Vidal once described S.T.H. as "one of the best radical papers in the country." William Burroughs read Straight to Hell with eagerness and admiration. Allen Ginsberg, Tennessee Williams, and Christopher Isherwood were all fans. Pictured holding copies of STH were Cookie Mueller and Jackie Curtis; Fran Lebowitz appears with an STH shirt. In contrast, gay author John Preston, who openly admitted writing pornography, called STH and its writers "dirty", "filthy", "sick", "kinky", and "twisted".

Charles Shively said:

Boyd had a voice unique and inimitable. He neither overstated nor understated the joys of gay sex. ... Sham and fraud of any kind appalled him. He ridiculed the hypocrisy of police, clerics, politicians, therapists, teachers, and others of the so-called "helping professions". He likewise disdained gay/lesbian spokespersons and leaders dedicated to cleaning up the filthy in us all.

=== Exhibitions and tributes ===
An exhibition of Straight to Hell material, curated by Billy Miller, was held at the Berlin gallery Exile, October 19 – November 16, 2008, where Jan Wandrag created the "installation" "Straight To Hell: In Cock We Trust". "An installation" by Jan Wandrag was held July 25, 2010, at the White Cubicle Toilet Gallery in London.

The San Francisco gay bookstore A Different Light held "Straight to Hell: A Night of Readings from the Cum-Drenched Pages of S.T.H." The poster announcing the reading, on Saturday, November 26, has been preserved.

A song about McDonald was included on the 2006 Matmos album The Rose Has Teeth in the Mouth of a Beast, each of whose tracks is about an important but controversial character. McDonald thus found himself in the company of Ludwig Wittgenstein, William Burroughs, Valerie Solanas, and King Ludwig II of Bavaria. McDonald's track includes clandestine recordings of sex acts at the San Francisco oral sex club Blow Buddies.

=== Archival material ===
The Cornell University Library holds a collection of McDonald's papers, photographs, correspondence, and computer files produced from 1988 to 2003.
