= MØN =

Group of seven French musicians

MØN or MØN - Rock Orchestra is a group of seven French musicians, created in 2004, whose music spans rock, pop and classical. The music draws on the post-rock styles of Silver Mt. Zion and Mogwai, integrating artists such as Rachel's, Tindersticks, Blonde Redhead, Steve Reich and Mercury Rev.

Since September 2006, MØN has given concerts in various parts of France as well as in Switzerland and Luxembourg. In June 2007, it won the Paris Jeunes Talents award.

The name of the band is inspired by the island of Møn, which is one of the smaller Danish islands in the Baltic Sea.
