= Regicide (disambiguation) =

A regicide is the purposeful killing of a monarch or sovereign of a polity, or the person who does such.

Regicide may also refer to:

- "Regicide", a playing card game devised by Badgers From Mars
- "Regicide", a song by Matmos from the 2003 album The Civil War
- Warhammer 40,000: Regicide, a turn-based strategy chess-like video game developed by Hammerfall Publishing
