= War Machine (2017 soundtrack) =

2017 film soundtrack album

War Machine (Original Score from the Netflix Original Film)

Film score by Nick Cave and Warren Ellis
- Released: May 26, 2017
- Recorded: 2017
- Studio: Retreat Recording Studios, Brighton
- Genre: Film score
- Length: 51:54
- Label: Lakeshore; Invada
- Producer: David Michôd; Jake Jackson; Nick Cave; Warren Ellis

Nick Cave and Warren Ellis chronology
Mars (2017)	War Machine (2017)	Wind River (2017)

War Machine (Original Score from the Netflix Original Film) is the film score to the 2017 film War Machine directed by David Michôd starring Brad Pitt, Anthony Michael Hall, Anthony Hayes, Topher Grace, Will Poulter, Tilda Swinton, and Ben Kingsley. The original score is composed by Nick Cave and Warren Ellis, and the album featured their score along with compositions of Hans-Joachim Roedelius and a song performed the chamber music group Rachel's. The album was released through Lakeshore Records and Invada Records on May 26, 2017 to positive reviews from critics.

== Background ==
Nick Cave and Warren Ellis composed the musical score for War Machine. Regarding the working experience, Ellis stated that it was a "geniune pleasure" to curate the score as Michôd was supervising the musical process on the very first day the duo worked one and considered it to be a learning experience, as Michôd provided several inputs and had a great attention to detail. Ellis further added that Michôd wanted to do something different from their usual scores, hence the inclusion of Hans-Joachim Roedelius' musical pieces were his idea and had a specific idea on what he wanted the score to underpin.

The duo further stepped away from using the traditional instruments and did out of their musical experiences. Ellis considered the score to be both light and dark, as well as propulsive and meditative at the same time. The composer also admitted the use of spiritual electronics which captured "both the melancholy and the terrible absurdity of the Afghan war". Cave and Ellis used ambient instrumentation along with analog synthesizers to produce the sounds of the 1970s, and vocal harmonies in some of the cues. Michôd further produced the score with recording and mixing engineer Jake Jackson.

== Release ==
The title track was released as a single on May 22, 2017. The album was released digitally on May 26, 2017 through Lakeshore Records and Invada Records, as well as in physical CDs on June 30, and in LPs on August 4.

== Reception ==
Nick Roseblade of Drowned in Sound rated 8 out of 10 and wrote: "War Machine doesn’t sound like a typical Cave and Ellis score. It feels like they’ve fallen back in love with not only music, but scoring films. Every track feels epic, but understated at the same time. When listening to it at work, on the bus, or at home the music never dominates you 100%, as a John Williams or Alexandre Desplat score can do, instead it sits just behind the scene, or your life, and accompanies it perfectly [...] This is the work of musicians who not only understand how to craft incredible pieces of music, but totally understand the genre they are working with. Whatever happens with Nick Cave and the Bad Seeds going forward, let’s hope that Cave and Ellis continue to create exquisite scores like this."

Brendan Telford of The Quietus wrote "The underlying notion behind a Cave-Ellis score is the implicit lyricism evoked within the sounds and spaces they create. While much has been said about Cave’s esoteric linguistics, he has surrounded himself for years with those who speak volumes through the caressing of their beloved instrument. Ellis is a rare beast in that he has taken the violin and given it a voice well beyond what would be deemed possible or even acceptable in his Dirty Three guise. And with War Machine they have created a cyclical journey – one that starts light and familiar, before taking the listener down a river of minimalist self-discovery that is always in twilight, always in purgatory, always without end." Simon Tucker of Louder Than War wrote "War Machine is not only one of Cave and Ellis’ finest scores but one of the best things the duo have ever created in all of their myriad of projects. It is a beautiful, twisted listen that has a real sense of perpetual motion. A sensational score made by two people who are at the top of their game. In time it will rank highly on fans’ and critics “best of” lists when discussing the work of the duo."

== Track listing ==
No.	Title	Artist(s)	Length
1.	"Ah America"	Nick Cave; Warren Ellis	1:14
2.	"Humble Man"	Cave; Ellis	3:22
3.	"The Bubble"	Cave; Ellis	3:20
4.	"The Civilian Executive"	Cave; Ellis	1:58
5.	"In Liebe Dein"	Hans-Joachim Roedelius	3:44
6.	"Badi Basim"	Cave; Ellis	1:24
7.	"Kamee"	Roedelius	3:41
8.	"The Moon Landing"	Cave; Ellis	0:43
9.	"Our Noise"	Cave; Ellis	0:58
10.	"Fabelwein"	Roedelius	5:05
11.	"Jeanie"	Cave; Ellis	1:28
12.	"NY Snow Globe"	Rachel's	2:28
13.	"Thousands of Parades, All Over America"	Cave; Ellis	5:04
14.	"Marjah"	Cave; Ellis	3:18
15.	"Staunen Im Fjord"	Roedelius	3:36
16.	"The Hand of Helping"	Cave; Ellis	1:57
17.	"Be Lovely"	Cave; Ellis	2:55
18.	"A Page in the History Books"	Cave; Ellis	2:36
19.	"War Machine"	Cave; Ellis	3:03
Total length:			51:54

== Personnel ==
Credits adapted from liner notes:

- Music composer – Nick Cave, Warren Ellis
- Producer – David Michôd, Jake Jackson, Nick Cave, Warren Ellis
- Piano, vibraphone, synthesizer – Nick Cave
- Violin, clarinet, viola, synthesizer, loops, alto flute – Warren Ellis
- Recording – Jake Jackson, Jon Bailey
- Assistant recording – Chris Blakey
- Mixing – Jake Jackson
- Mastering – Rob Kleiner
- Executive producer – Brian McNelis, Skip Williamson
- Art direction – John Bergin
- A&R – Eric Craig
