= Handwriting (disambiguation) =

Handwriting may refer to a person's particular style of writing by hand.

Handwriting may also refer to:

- Penmanship, the technique of writing with the hand and a writing instrument
- Hand (handwriting), a distinct style of calligraphy in palaeography
- Manuscript, any written document that is put down by hand
- Handwriting (album), a 1995 album by Rachel's
- Cursive, commonly called "handwriting" in the United States, Canada, Australia and New Zealand

Handwritten may refer to:

- Handwritten (The Gaslight Anthem album), 2012, or the title track
- Handwritten (Shawn Mendes album), 2015

== See also ==
- Handwriting exemplar, a piece of writing that can be examined forensically
