= Shannon Wright =

American singer and songwriter

- Wright at the Primavera Sound Festival, Barcelona 2007

Background information
- Born: Jacksonville, Florida, U.S.
- Genres: Indie rock, experimental, lo-fi
- Occupations: Singer-songwriter, musician
- Instruments: Vocals, guitar, piano
- Years active: 1999–present
- Labels: Touch and Go, Quarterstick, Vicious Circle Records

Shannon Wright is an American singer-songwriter. She was born in Jacksonville, Florida, United States, where she spent her childhood.

Former member of the band Crowsdell, Shannon Wright moved from New York to Chapel Hill, North Carolina in 1998, and while in Chapel Hill, Wright started writing songs and playing them for friends. With their encouragement she sent a 4-track cassette tape to a friend of a friend who started Overcoat Records. They released her first 7" A Tin Crown for the Social Bash. Later that year, Wright signed with Touch and Go Records in 1999 from Chicago, releasing six albums. Wright signed with Vicious Circle (France) in 2003 and continues to release records with them. In 2012, Wright signed with Ernest Jennings and released Secret Blood and In Film Sound in the States.

== Recording career ==
FlightSafety Wright's first record received critical acclaim for her lyrics and songwriting abilities. FlightSafety consists of simple guitar and piano chord progressions with vocal melodies. Wright plays almost all the instruments on this release and all other releases following FlightSafety.

Shannon Wright

Maps of Tacit Recorded with Andy Baker and Steve Albini. "Overall, Maps of Tacit finds Wright growing more adventurous both as a composer and performer; it's a dark and challenging work, yet it isn't off-putting or overly harrowing, and its bracing experimentalism and originality suggest even greater things to come." – AllMusic review by Steve Huey.

Perishable Goods was a limited mini-album compiled of appearances by: Alan Sparhawk of Low, Crooked Fingers, and Rachel Grimes and Christian Fredrickson from Rachel's.

Dyed in the Wool, recorded with Andy Baker and Steve Albini. Appearances on the album include label-mates Shipping News, Rachel's and Heather Macintosh.

Shannon Wright

Over the Sun recorded with Steve Albini; although Wright had recorded with Albini before on several occasions (Maps of Tacit & Dyed in the Wool), this was the first time Wright and Albini completed a full-length record together. This album comes closest to capturing her raw live-performances.

Yann Tiersen and Shannon Wright; Sharing 50–50 songwriting credits with French musician and composer Yann Tiersen.

Let in the Light recorded with Andy Baker. Wright moves back to her slightly simpler instrumentation and recording styles, exploring experimental and unorthodox piano melodies with a bit of classical influence. "Shannon Wright is an example of that shocking, spooky thing: a natural." – The New York Times

Honeybee Girls Piano, organ, guitars, violin, cello with indistinct tones.

Secret Blood

In Film Sound was recorded in 2013 with Kevin Ratterman in Louisville, Kentucky. Recorded mostly live as a three-piece with Todd Cook on bass and Kyle Crabtree on drums. "It's emblematic of the tense, discomforting oeuvre Wright favors from terse noisy bursts of guitar to moody minor key elegies." – Creative Loafing

Division – 2017 album recorded in Paris and Rome at KML Studios with David Chalmin. "Wright's songwriting reaches a new perfection in the most tenuous murmurs, where it is still a tear that works, an evil that clings, a fermenting poison. The nuances are all here: less guitar and more piano give the impression of chamber music – but flooded – or aquarium – but overturned. This frightened indecision, this trouble of the eyes too wide open, is the very art of Shannon Wright, very pure singer, too rare." – Les Inrocks Paris, France

== Filmscores ==
- Original score for the film Les Confins du Monde – "To the Ends of the World". Directed by: Guillaume Nicloux. Starring Gaspard Ulliel. Screened at the 2018 Cannes Film Festival in the Directors' Fortnight section.
- Original score by Shannon Wright for the documentary Homemade.

== Other works ==
- Wright provided songs for The Key (French: La Clef), a 2007 French thriller film directed by Guillaume Nicloux and starring Guillaume Canet.
- Wright provided vocals for "Last Things Last" on Systems/Layers for the band Rachel's.
- Wright covered the Bee Gees song "I Started a Joke" on Perishable Goods E.P.
- Wright covers The Smiths song "Asleep" on both A Junior Hymn / Asleep and Honeybee Girls
- Wright played All Tomorrow's Parties in 2002 UK curated by Shellac, 2003 ATP/PACIFIC curated by Matt Groening, 2007 UK curated by Dirty Three and the 2012 UK ATP curated again by Shellac
- "Hinterland" from Wright's Dyed in the Wool was used in Julien Levy's movie The Shape of Art to Come (2011).

== Album discography ==
- Flightsafety (1999)
- Maps of Tacit (2000)
- Perishable Goods (2001)
- Dyed in the Wool (2002)
- Over the Sun (2004)
- Let in the Light (2007)
- Yann Tiersen & Shannon Wright (2007)
- Honeybee Girls (2009)
- Secret Blood (2010)
- In Film Sound (2013)
- Division (2017)
- Providence (2019)
- Reservoir of Love (2025)
