= If You Only Knew =

If You Only Knew may refer to:

- "If You Only Knew" (song), 2008
- "If You Only Knew", a 2009 song by Savannah Outen
- If You Only Knew (Acetone album), 1996
- If You Only Knew (Gina Thompson album), 1999
- If You Only Knew, a 1956 album by Jimmy Scott
- If You Only Knew, a song on the 1987 album Piledriver: The Wrestling Album II

== See also ==
- "If Only You Knew", a song on Patti LaBelle's 1983 album I'm in Love Again
