= Spondee (disambiguation) =

Spondee is a metrical foot consisting of two stressed syllables.

Spondee may also refer to:

- "Spondee" (song), an electronica song composed by Matmos
- Libation, ritual offering of wine poured out to the gods before drinking
