= Full On Night =

Studio album by Rachel's and Matmos
- Released: May 9, 2000
- Genre: Instrumental, post-rock
- Length: 30:31
- Label: Quarterstick

Professional ratings
Review scores
Source	Rating
AllMusic	3/5 stars

Full On Night is a collaborative EP between Rachel's and Matmos. It was released on Quarterstick Records in May 2000 and contains two tracks. Matmos remarks that:

"The Precise Temperature of Darkness" is a reconstruction of "Full On Night," using the original studio masters and a live version as source. The original version of "Full On Night" appeared on Rachel's album Handwriting.

== Track listing ==
1. "Full on Night" (Recension mix) – 12:31
2. "The Precise Temperature of Darkness" – 18:00

== Personnel ==
Contributors to Full On Night include:

- Christian Frederickson – viola
- Edward Grimes – drums
- Rachel Grimes – piano, organ
- Dominic Johnson – viola
- Jason Noble – guitar, tape
- Eve Miller – cello
- Drew Daniel – sampling, sequencing, digital editing
- M.C. Schmidt – bowed acoustic guitar, mixing
- Gregory King – photography
