= Metallic Life Review =

2025 album by Matmos

Studio album by Matmos
- Released: June 20, 2025
- Length: 41:11
- Label: Thrill Jockey

Matmos chronology
Return to Archive (2023)	Metallic Life Review (2025)

Metallic Life Review is the fifteenth studio album by electronic duo Matmos composed of sounds from metal objects such as pots and pans, cemetery gates, and aluminum cans. It was released by Thrill Jockey on June 20, 2025. It was announced with a single, "Changing States", in April 2025.

Professional ratings
Aggregate scores
Source	Rating
Metacritic	79/100
Review scores
Source	Rating
AllMusic	4/5 stars
Mojo	4/5 stars
musicOMH	4/5 stars
Pitchfork	7.2/10
PopMatters	7/10
Uncut	7/10

== Track listing ==
Metallic Life Review track listing
No.	Title	Length
1.	"Norway Doorway"	4:14
2.	"The Rust Belt"	5:06
3.	"Changing States"	4:14
4.	"Steel Tongues"	3:58
5.	"The Chrome Reflects Our Image"	2:57
6.	"Metallic Life Review"	20:42
Total length:		41:11
