= Regards/Ukłony dla Bogusław Schaeffer =

Studio album by Matmos
- Released: May 20, 2022
- Length: 42:23
- Label: Thrill Jockey

Matmos chronology
The Consuming Flame (2020)	Regards/Ukłony dla Bogusław Schaeffer (2022)	Return to Archive (2023)

Professional ratings
Aggregate scores
Source	Rating
Metacritic	81/100
Review scores
Source	Rating
AllMusic	4/5 stars
Exclaim!	8/10
musicOMH	3.5/5 stars
Pitchfork	7.2/10
PopMatters	8/10

Regards/Ukłony dla Bogusław Schaeffer is the thirteenth studio album by electronic duo Matmos, released through Thrill Jockey on May 20, 2022. It was assembled from a sample pack the duo created of electroacoustic works by Bogusław Schaeffer.

== Track listing ==
Regards/Ukłony dla Bogusław Schaeffer track listing
No.	Title	Length
1.	"Resemblage / Parasamblaż"	5:32
2.	"Cobra Wages Shuffle / Off! Schable w gurę!"	5:28
3.	"Few, Far Chaos Bugles / Uff... Bosch gra Wałęsę"	3:40
4.	"Flashcube Fog Wares / Głucha Affera Słów"	3:06
5.	"Flight to Sodom / Lot do Salo"	4:09
6.	"Tonight There Is Something Special About the Moon / Jaki księżyc dziś wieczór..."	7:37
7.	"If All Things Were Turned to Smoke / Gdyby wszystko stało się dymem"	6:34
8.	"Anti-Antiphon (Absolute Decomposition) / Anty-Antyfona (Dekonstrukcja na całego)"	6:17
Total length:		42:23
