= Supreme Balloon =

Studio album by Matmos
- Released: May 6, 2008
- Genre: Electronic
- Length: 49:16
- Label: Matador

Matmos chronology
The Rose Has Teeth in the Mouth of a Beast (2006)	Supreme Balloon (2008)	Treasure State (2010)

Professional ratings
Aggregate scores
Source	Rating
Metacritic	78/100
Review scores
Source	Rating
AllMusic	4/5 stars
The A.V. Club	C+
The Boston Phoenix	4/4 stars
Mojo	4/5 stars
musicOMH	4/5 stars
Pitchfork	7.5/10
PopMatters	8/10
The Skinny	4/5 stars
Tiny Mix Tapes	4.5/5 stars
Under the Radar	8/10

Supreme Balloon is a 2008 studio album by American electronic music duo Matmos, released via Matador Records.

On the album, Matmos skipped sampling antics in favor of a lighthearted "cosmic pop" record made entirely out of synthesizers. The exotic and antiquated synths used here heavily spotlight the classic 1960s/1970s/1980s consumer electronic rigs of Arp, Korg, Roland, Waldorf, and Moog.

== Critical reception ==
At Metacritic, which assigns a weighted average score out of 100 to reviews from mainstream critics, Supreme Balloon received an average score of 78% based on 20 reviews, indicating "generally favorable reviews".

Mark Pytlik of Pitchfork gave the album a 7.5 out of 10, calling it "a woozily beautiful-sounding record, as crystalline, gleaming, and full-bodied as vintage Terry Riley."

== Track listing ==
CD edition
No.	Title	Length
1.	"Rainbow Flag"	3:50
2.	"Polychords"	3:31
3.	"Mister Mouth"	3:48
4.	"Exciter Lamp and the Variable Band"	3:21
5.	"Les Folies Francaises"	2:24
6.	"Supreme Balloon"	24:08
7.	"Cloudhoppers"	2:58
8.	"Orban" (preceded by 10 minutes of silence)	5:15
9.	Untitled (silence)	0:08

Vinyl edition
No.	Title	Length
1.	"Rainbow Flag"	3:50
2.	"Polychords"	3:31
3.	"Mister Mouth"	3:48
4.	"Exciter Lamp and the Variable Band"	3:21
5.	"Zemoi"	3:51
6.	"Orban"	5:12
7.	"Les Folies Francaises"	2:24
8.	"Cloudhoppers"	2:58
9.	"Hashish Master"	7:50
10.	"Staircase"	4:25
11.	"Supreme Balloon"	24:08

== Charts ==
Chart	Peak position
US Top Dance Albums (Billboard)	20
