= The Marriage of True Minds =

Studio album by Matmos
- Released: February 19, 2013
- Genre: Electronic
- Length: 49:50
- Label: Thrill Jockey

Matmos chronology
Treasure State (2010)	The Marriage of True Minds (2013)	Ultimate Care II (2016)

The Marriage of True Minds is the ninth studio album by electronic music group Matmos.

== Production ==
Drew Daniel and Martin Schmidt, the members of Matmos, spent four years conducting parapsychological experiments based on the ganzfeld experiment. After subjects were put into a state of sensory deprivation, Daniel attempted to "transmit the concept of the new Matmos record” into their minds. Subjects were asked to describe aloud any images that entered their minds. The Marriage of True Minds was constructed using both the subjects' verbal descriptions and the band members' reenactments of these "psychic" visions.

In advance of the full-length album, Matmos released the Ganzfeld EP on October 16, 2012, via Thrill Jockey. Baltimore producer Schwarz later released a club mix of "Very Large Green Triangles" with proceeds benefiting the Maryland Food Bank.

The album was recorded and mixed at Daniel and Schmidt's Baltimore home and Snow Ghost Studio in Montana, and mastered in San Francisco by Thomas DiMuzio. The album's final track is a "polyglot reconstruction" of Buzzcocks' song "E.S.P.", from their 1978 album Love Bites.

== Reception ==
Professional ratings
Aggregate scores
Source	Rating
Metacritic	79/100
Review scores
Source	Rating
AllMusic	4.5/5 stars
Alternative Press	4/5 stars
Blurt	4/5 stars
Consequence of Sound	4/5 stars
DIY	3.5/5 stars
Exclaim!	8/10
Pitchfork	7.5/10
Q	4/5 stars
Resident Advisor	4.0/5
Tiny Mix Tapes	4/5 stars

Pitchfork's Jayson Greene noted that Matmos' music "has always had an antic, morbid cast to it, like a Grimm's fairy tale with all the ghoulish aspects slightly accentuated, and The Marriage of True Minds is maybe the most confident they've ever been at balancing the two sides of this equation." Heather Phares, reviewing the album for AllMusic, wrote that it "effortlessly [balances] the duo's freewheeling, meticulous, ominous, and playful sides" and "delivers some of the most abstract, and most visceral, music" in Matmos' discography.

== Track listing ==
No.	Title	Length
1.	"You"	7:02
2.	"Very Large Green Triangles"	4:44
3.	"Mental Radio"	3:40
4.	"Ross Transcript"	2:36
5.	"Teen Paranormal Romance"	4:46
6.	"Tunnel"	5:40
7.	"In Search of a Lost Faculty"	6:10
8.	"Aetheric Vehicle"	7:14
9.	"ESP"	8:04

== Personnel ==
Matmos

- Drew Daniel – Arp 2600, autoharp, banjo, bells, editing, sampling, sequencing, sleigh bells, triangle, vocals, wood block
- M.C. (Martin) Schmidt – bells, bongos, cymbals, mixing, percussion, photography, piano, processing, shaker, timpani, treated piano, triangle, tuning forks, vocals

Additional musicians and production staff

- Bret Allen – mixing
- John Berndt – sax (alto)
- Andrew Bernstein – cowbell, roto toms, tambourine
- Rose Hammer Burt – sax (baritone)
- Dan Deacon – vocals
- Tiffany DeFoe - sax (tenor)
- Angel Deradoorian – vocals
- Thomas Dimuzio – mastering
- Max Eisenberg – vocals
- Carl Ewing – drums, tuning forks
- Owen Gardner – cello, guitar, piri
- Sam Haberman – drums, percussion, triangle
- Ayman Harper – stones, tap dancing, wood
- Connor Kizer – trumpet
- Jon Leidecker – mixing, processing
- Dominique Leone – vocals
- Jay Lesser – guitar
- Gerry Mak – vocals
- Duncan Moore – bagpipes
- Edward Phillips – vocals
- Carly Ptak – vocals
- Ashot Sarkissjan – violin
- Ed Schrader – vocals
- Pete Shelley – composer, lyricist
- Clodagh Simonds – vocals
- Jenn Wasner – vocals
- John Wiese – noise
- Leslie Winer – composer, lyricist
