= Music for Egon Schiele =

1995 music album

Studio album by Rachel's
- Released: February 20, 1996 (U.S.)
- Recorded: July 20–24, 1995
- Genre: Chamber music, post-rock
- Length: 47:03
- Label: Quarterstick

Rachel's chronology
Handwriting (1995)	Music for Egon Schiele (1996)	The Sea and the Bells (1996)

Music for Egon Schiele is the second album by the instrumental group Rachel's, released in 1996.

The album was composed as the score to a theatrical production, Egon Schiele, about the life of the painter Egon Schiele. It was staged by the Itinerant Theater Guild, in 1995.

== Critical reception ==
Professional ratings
Review scores
Source	Rating
AllMusic	4/5 stars
Alternative Press	4/5 stars
Sputnikmusic	4.5/5

The Village Voice called the album "a haunting array of compositions that attempt to narrate the elements of Schiele's life through cello, piano, viola, and bass." Rolling Stone noted that "the music is as stark and loving as Schiele's art, the sound of a noble, lonely agony rendered in elegant monochrome."

AllMusic wrote that "it is to pianist Rachel Grimes' credit that her pieces convey a stirring sense of drama and vivid imagery that perfectly match her subject."

== Track listing ==
All songs composed by Rachel Grimes

1. "Family Portrait" – 5:41
2. "Egon & Gertie" – 3:02
3. "First Self-Portrait Series" – 3:47
4. "Mime Van Osen" – 3:05
5. "Second Self-Portrait Series" – 2:30
6. "Wally, Egon & Models in the Studio" – 4:41
7. "Promenade" – 8:24
8. "Third Self-Portrait Series" – 2:23
9. "Egon, Edith & Wally Meet" – 2:41
10. "Egon & Wally Embrace and Say Farewell" – 3:09
11. "Egon & Edith" – 2:55
12. "Second Family Portrait" – 4:45

== Personnel ==
Musicians

- Rachel Grimes – piano, mixing, design & photography
- Christian Frederickson – viola
- Wendy Doyle – cello

Technical

- Jason Noble – producer, mixing, design & photography
- Bob Weston – engineer, mixing
- John Loder – mastering
- Egon Schiele – artwork
- Aaron Frisbee, Chip Dumstorf – Graphic Technologies
- Gregory King – booklet printing
