= Selenography (album) =

Studio album by Rachel's
- Released: June 8, 1999
- Recorded: July 26, 1997 – January 24, 1999
- Studios: Chicago Recording Company (Chicago, Illinois); Pachyderm (Cannon Falls, Minnesota); Lucky Anchor (Louisville, Kentucky); MAJA AudioGroup (Philadelphia, Pennsylvania)
- Genre: Post-rock
- Length: 59:35
- Label: Quarterstick

Rachel's chronology
The Sea and the Bells (1996)	Selenography (1999)	Systems/Layers (2003)

Professional ratings
Review scores
Source	Rating
AllMusic	4.5/5 stars
NME	5/10
Pitchfork	8.0/10

Selenography is the fourth studio album by American post-rock band Rachel's. It was released on June 8, 1999 by Quarterstick Records.

Selenography is the scientific study of the Moon's topography.

== Track listing ==
No.	Title	Writer(s)	Length
1.	"A French Galleasse"	Christian Frederickson; Rachel Grimes; Jason Noble	6:13
2.	"On Demeter"	Frederickson; Grimes; Noble	7:04
3.	"The Last Light"	Frederickson	3:26
4.	"Kentucky Nocturne"	Frederickson; Grimes; Noble	5:46
5.	"Honeysuckle Suite (Sugar Maple – Elm – Sweetgum)"	Grimes	5:41
6.	"Artemisia"	Noble	3:13
7.	"Old Road 60"	Grimes	5:08
8.	"An Evening of Long Goodbyes"	Noble	5:32
9.	"Cuts the Metal Cold"	Grimes	2:29
10.	"The Mysterious Disappearance of Louis LePrince"	Frederickson	4:45
11.	"Forgiveness"	Frederickson; Grimes; Noble	6:38
12.	"Hearts and Drums"	Noble	4:00

== Personnel ==
According to the album liner notes:

Rachel's

- Christian Frederickson – viola (1–4, 7–12), sampler (2), coins (3), sympathetic vibrations (3), gutter rattle (3) keyboards (6), bowed gutter (8), accordion (10), fake instruments (10), sound effects (10)
- Edward Grimes – drums (1, 2, 4, 10, 12), cymbal (7), vibraphone (8)
- Rachel Grimes – piano (1–4, 7, 9), harpsichord (5), organ (7, 11), zither (7), percussion (7), synthicord (10), voice (10)
- Gregory King – percussion (8)
- Eve Miller – cello (1, 3, 7, 9–12)
- Jason Noble – guitar (1, 2, 4, 8, 9, 11), sampler (2), gaff (3), keyboards (6, 8, 12), drum machine (6, 10, 12), percussion (6, 12), cymbal (7), bass (8, 10), bottles (8), snare drum (10), vibraphone (11), Wurlitzer electric piano (12)

Additional musicians

- Dominic Johnson – viola (1–4, 7, 9)
- Giovana Cacciola – vocals (6, 12)
- Kyle Crabtree – percussion (8, 11)
- Steve Buttleman – trumpet (9)

Technical

- Robert Weston – engineering, mixing
- John Golden – mastering
- Adriel Heisey – aerial photographs
- Gregory King – centerfold painting
