= Crowsdell =

American indie pop band

Crowsdell was an indie-pop band from Jacksonville, Florida. The members included Shannon Wright (guitar and vocals), Paul Howell (bass), and Laurie Anne Wall (drums). They released singles on two different labels before signing with Big Cat in 1994. They recorded their first full-length CD, Dreamette, with Stephen Malkmus of Pavement. After Big Cat merged with a larger record label, their second full-length CD was dropped before ever hitting the shelves. The band subsequently broke up and Shannon Wright went on to produce numerous solo albums.

== Discography ==
- Meany (single)
- Lickety Split (single)
- Darren (single)
- Down/Bubbles (single)
- Sugar-Coated/Trunk (single)
- Dreamette (1995)
- The End of Summer (EP) (1995)
- Within the Curve of an Arm (1997)

== Sources and External Links ==
- Quilt of Demand
- MSN Music: Crowsdell
