= Systems/Layers =

Systems / Layers

Studio album by Rachel's
- Released: October 7, 2003 (U.S.)
- Recorded: July 2001 – June 2003
- Genre: Chamber music, post-rock
- Length: 1:02:21
- Label: Quarterstick 75

Rachel's chronology
Selenography (1999)	Systems / Layers (2003)

Professional ratings
Review scores
Source	Rating
AllMusic	4/5 stars
The Encyclopedia of Popular Music	3/5 stars

Systems/Layers is the final LP by the instrumental group Rachel's. It was released on October 7, 2003, on Quarterstick Records. The album is a collaborative dance/theater piece with the New York ensemble SITI Company.

The album peaked at No. 16 on the Billboard Classical Albums chart.

== Reception ==
Initial critical response to Systems/Layers was positive. At Metacritic, which assigns a normalized rating out of 100 to reviews from mainstream critics, the album has received an average score of 81, based on 14 reviews. PopMatters called the album "one of the year's finest releases," writing that "its greatest gift ... is its sheer compatibility -- you can take Systems/Layers anywhere and it will speak to you." Exclaim! called it "at once touching and haunted, intimate and disturbingly uncomfortable." The Times deemed it the band's worst album. The East Bay Express labeled it "the soundtrack to your most brilliant, reflective life."

== Track listing ==
1. "Moscow Is in the Telephone" – 3:59
2. "Water from the Same Source" – 6:18
3. "Systems/Layers" – 3:11
4. "Expect Delays" – 3:57
5. "Arterial" – 1:45
6. "Even/Odd" – 3:14
7. "Wouldn't Live Anywhere Else" – 2:47
8. "Esperanza" – 5:32
9. "Packet Switching" – 1:09
10. "Where_Have_All_My_Files_Gone?" – 2:49
11. "Reflective Surfaces" – 2:00
12. "Unclear Channel" – 2:47
13. "Last Things Last" – 3:33
14. "Anytime Soon" – 2:18
15. "Air Conditioning / A Closed Feeling" – 3:39
16. "Singing Bridge" – 2:13
17. "And Keep Smiling" – 2:38
18. "4 or 5 Trees" – 6:04
19. "NY Snow Globe" – 2:28

== Personnel ==
Rachel's

- Kyle Crabtree – drums (17)
- Christian Frederickson – viola, keyboards (1, 2, 4–6, 8–10, 14, 15, 17, 18)
- Edward Grimes – drums, keyboards (2, 16, 18)
- Rachel Grimes – piano, keyboards (1–5, 12–14, 18, 19)
- Greg King – films
- Eve Miller – cello (1, 2, 4, 5, 6–8, 10, 13–15)
- Jason Noble – bass, guitar, drums, toolbelt, keyboards (1, 2, 4, 10, 11, 13, 16, 18, 19)

Additional players

- Matthew Annin – French horn (1, 2, 8, 10)
- Wendy Doyle – cello (18)
- Doug Elmore – stand-up bass (17)
- Jane Halliday – violin (18)
- Sarah Hill – violin (18)
- Jamie Holman – viola (1, 4, 6, 10, 15)
- Karl Olsen – contrabass (1, 4, 6, 8, 10, 15)
- Marcus Ratzenboeck – violin (1, 4, 6, 8, 10, 15)
- Jennifer Shackleton – viola (8)
- Frederick Speck – conductor (8)
- Scott Staidle – violin (1, 4, 6, 8, 10, 15)
- Shannon Wright – vocals (13)
- Tim Zavadil – clarinet (2, 4, 8)
- SITI Company and their students at Utah State University and Skidmore College – live performances

Voices

- Hibba Abdul-Jabbar (7)
- Dino Bektasevic (7)
- Akiko Aizawa (1, 12)
- Jem Cohen (5, 7, 15, 17)
- Susan Hightower (1, 5)
- Libby King (5, 7, 11)
- Arianna Perez-Rivas (1, 7)
- Barney O'Hanlon (1, 5)
- Tara Schoch (5)
- Stephen Webber (1, 5, 7); spoken word (18)
