= Return to Archive =

Studio album by Matmos
- Released: November 3, 2023
- Length: 41:18
- Label: Smithsonian Folkways
- Producer: Drew Daniel; Martin Schmidt

Matmos chronology
Regards/Ukłony dla Bogusław Schaeffer (2022)	Return to Archive (2023)	Metallic Life Review (2025)

Return to Archive is the fourteenth studio album by electronic duo Matmos, released on November 3, 2023. It uses non-music material sourced from the Smithsonian Folkways collection in its composition; the album itself was commissioned to commemorate Folkways' 75th anniversary.

== Background ==
September 18, 2023, Matmos announced the release of their fourteenth studio album, along with the first single "Mud-Dauber Wasp".

== Critical reception ==
Professional ratings
Aggregate scores
Source	Rating
Metacritic	78/100
Review scores
Source	Rating
AllMusic	4/5 stars
Pitchfork	7.4/10
Mojo	4/5 stars
Uncut	7/10
Under the Radar	6/10

Return to Archive was met with "generally favorable" reviews from critics. At Metacritic, which assigns a weighted average rating out of 100 to reviews from mainstream publications, this release received an average score of 78, based on 7 reviews.

== Track listing ==
All tracks are written by Drew Daniel and M. C. Schmidt.

Return to Archive track listing
No.	Title	Length
1.	"Good Morning Electronics"	1:05
2.	"Injection Basic Sound"	2:55
3.	"Mud-Dauber Wasp"	3:35
4.	"Music or Noise?"	4:12
5.	"Why?" (featuring Evicshen)	4:03
6.	"Lend Me Your Ears"	3:46
7.	"Return to Archive" (featuring Aaron Dilloway)	13:28
8.	"The Way Japanese Beetles Sound to a Rose"	1:28
9.	"Going to Sleep" (featuring Aaron Dilloway)	6:44
Total length:		41:18

== Personnel ==
Matmos

- Drew Daniel – production, programming (all tracks); DJ (track 4)
- M. C. Schmidt – production (all tracks), programming (2–7, 9)
