= York Blvd. =

Studio album by Acetone
- Released: January 16, 2001
- Genre: Indie rock
- Length: 51:33
- Label: Vapor
- Producers: Eric Sarafin; Acetone

Acetone chronology
Acetone (1997)	York Blvd. (2001)	Acetone 1992–2001 (2017)

York Blvd. is an album by the American band Acetone, released on January 16, 2001. The band supported the album with a North American tour. It was Acetone's final studio album, as bassist and vocalist Richie Lee died in July 2001.

== Production ==
The album was produced by Eric Sarafin and the band. Vapor Records urged the band to use a producer who could help them find a tauter, more commercial sound. Lee employed pitch correction on some of his vocals. Acetone's guitarist, Mark Lightcap, primarily played a Yamaha SG 2000 from the 1970s; he also played trumpet on parts of the album. Acetone used a Hammond organ on a few tracks. The album title refers to York Boulevard, a street in Highland Park, Los Angeles. "Wonderful World" is about indie rock music scene mindsets.

== Critical reception ==
Professional ratings
Review scores
Source	Rating
AllMusic	4/5 stars
The Austin Chronicle	3.5/5 stars
Knoxville News Sentinel	2/5
Orange County Register	A−
The Philadelphia Inquirer	3.5/5 stars
Pitchfork	8.2/10

The Philadelphia Inquirer noted the "mangled, urban/country noir" and "vibrant new dusty psychedelic-blues", stating that "York is alive with densely arranged, tensely told stories of ruin, false accusations and ... brotherhood". Billboard said that "Acetone continues to mine a deliriously beautiful yet disparate aural soundscape... By not subscribing to any one musical genre, Acetone is free to do away with conventions and limitations." The Knoxville News Sentinel opined that "this one-gimmick album is lulling in small doses, before the uncompromising feebleness of Lee's vocals sinks in and the pointlessness of it all hits home."

Guitar Player stated that Lightcap "weaves stark textures with simple, bone-dry tones—employing subtle attack, clanging intervals, and feedback in place of multiple parts or effects." The Nashville Scene called the band a "bottom-heavy amalgam of VU whisper-drone, Young-ian twang, and Jeffersonian head trips". The Orange County Register considered York Blvd. "organic chill music, a calmative with no synthetic aftertaste." The Austin Chronicle advised: "Call it post-surf: warm, pastoral music so laid back it creeps up on you with its Gram Parsons twang and sends the reverb-soaked warm 'n' fuzzies creeping through your bloodstream."

In 2018, the Los Angeles Times, reporting on the release of Acetone 1992–2001, labeled York Blvd. the band's best album and "a poignant epitaph", writing that Acetone specialized "in a languid blend of spacious psychedelic rock and Americana". In 2023, Pitchfork deemed it one "of indie rock’s most exquisite albums".

== Track listing ==
No.	Title	Length
1.	"Things Are Gonna Be Alright"	3:50
2.	"Wonderful World"	5:00
3.	"19"	4:10
4.	"Vibrato"	4:21
5.	"Like I Told You"	4:36
6.	"It's a Lie"	4:44
7.	"Bonds"	5:56
8.	"One Drop"	5:55
9.	"Vaccination"	6:36
10.	"Stray"	6:25
Total length:		51:33

== Personnel ==
- Richie Lee – bass, lead vocals, backing vocals
- Mark Lightcap – guitar, lead vocals ("Like I Told You"), backing vocals, trumpet
- Steve Hadley – drums
