= Plastic Anniversary =

Studio album by Matmos
- Released: March 15, 2019
- Studio: Snowghost Studios (Whitefish, Montana)
- Length: 40:20
- Label: Thrill Jockey

Matmos chronology
Ultimate Care II (2016)	Plastic Anniversary (2019)	The Consuming Flame (2020)

Plastic Anniversary is the eleventh studio album by experimental electronic duo Matmos. It was released on March 15, 2019.

== Production ==
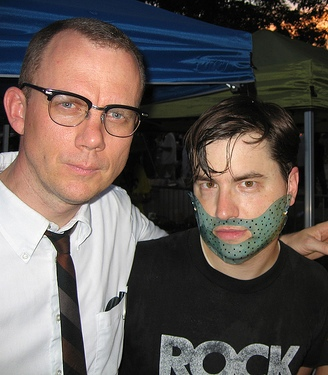
M. C. Schmidt and Drew Daniel of Matmos, pictured in 2006

All of the album's sounds originate from plastic objects. Matmos intended the album to explore our relationship to plastic and how its qualities of "durability, portability, and longevity" are both useful for humans and harmful to the environment. The album also celebrates the couple's 25th anniversary. It was released through Thrill Jockey on March 15, 2019. The label offered a pink and green recycled vinyl edition available exclusively through mail order. A deluxe box set, signed by the artists, contains a limited edition color vinyl release of the record, a bonus track, a t-shirt, and an unplayable/sculptural record made with plastic bottles (with a display stand). Proceeds from the box set go to The Ocean Cleanup, a Dutch engineering nonprofit that develops technology to remove ocean plastic pollution.

The album's first single, "Silicone Gel Implant", features a silicone breast implant, plastic flutes, and a PVC pan flute. Deerhoof's Greg Saunier plays percussion on plastic objects.

== Critical reception ==
Professional ratings
Aggregate scores
Source	Rating
Metacritic	76/100
Review scores
Source	Rating
AllMusic	4.5/5 stars
Exclaim!	8/10
The Line of Best Fit	6/10
musicOMH	4.5/5 stars
Pitchfork	7.6/10
PopMatters	8/10
Q	4/5 stars
Resident Advisor	3.6/5
Tiny Mix Tapes	4/5 stars
Under the Radar	8/10

Plastic Anniversary received generally positive reviews from critics. At Metacritic, which assigns a normalized rating out of 100 to reviews from mainstream publications, the album received an average score of 76, based on 16 reviews. In the review for AllMusic, Heather Phares claimed, "At once vibrantly creative and deeply disturbing, Plastic Anniversary is filled with nearly as many dualities as Matmos themselves. Over the years, they've turned what could be a gimmicky approach into an enduring and frequently profound form of expression, and Plastic Anniversary is both relevant to its time and another well-conceived, thought-provoking chapter in their long-running career."

Reviewing the album for Exclaim, Daniel Sylvester stated "Sometimes it's the pure novelty of a Matmos album that makes it so enjoyable. Sometimes it's that same novelty that makes it hard to separate the medium from the message. On Plastic Anniversary, the Baltimore duo aren't afraid to triumphantly straddle the line between these two truths." Spyros Stasis reviewed the album for PopMatters, concluding that "Plastic Anniversary showcases how it is possible for an artist to find inspiration even in the most mundane. And from those everyday, ordinary (and some not so ordinary) sources, they can elevate their artistic intentions to a higher level."

== Track listing ==
No.	Title	Length
1.	"Breaking Bread"	2:28
2.	"The Crying Pill"	4:24
3.	"Interior with Billiard Balls & Synthetic Fat"	4:12
4.	"Extending the Plastisphere to GJ237b"	0:10
5.	"Silicone Gel Implant"	4:31
6.	"Plastic Anniversary"	4:06
7.	"Thermoplastic Riot Shield"	4:05
8.	"Fanfare for Polyethylene Waste Containers"	4:00
9.	"The Singing Tube"	3:00
10.	"Collapse of the Fourth Kingdom"	5:02
11.	"Plastisphere"	4:20
Total length:		40:20

== Charts ==
Chart (2019)	Peak position
US Dance/Electronic Album Sales (Billboard)	6
