= Matmos (album) =

Studio album by Matmos
- Released: 1997
- Genre: Electronic
- Length: 73:01
- Label: Vague Terrain

Matmos chronology
Matmos (1997)	Quasi-Objects (1998)

Professional ratings
Review scores
Source	Rating
Allmusic	3/5 stars

Matmos is the 1997 debut album of American electronic music duo Matmos. The album features field recordings of everyday activities as well as more unusual things, such as nerve activity of a crayfish, on "Verber: amplified synapse".

The album is of an experimental nature and has elements of different genres of electronic music such as drum and bass, minimal techno and glitch.

== Track listing ==
1. "It Seems"
2. "Plastic Minor"
3. "...And Silver Light Popped in His Eyes"
4. "Lunaire"
5. "This is..."
6. "Three Guitar Lessons"
7. "Office Furniture (After Evidence)"
8. "Electric Things"
9. "Verber: amplified synapse"
10. "Nugent Sand"
11. "Schluss"
