= The Consuming Flame =

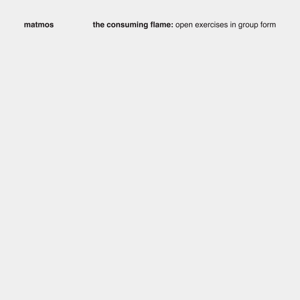

Studio album by Matmos
- Released: August 21, 2020
- Length: 177:53
- Label: Thrill Jockey

Matmos chronology
Plastic Anniversary (2019)	The Consuming Flame (2020)	Regards/Ukłony dla Bogusław Schaeffer (2022)

The Consuming Flame: Open Exercises in Group Form is the twelfth studio album by experimental electronic music duo Matmos, released on August 21, 2020 through Thrill Jockey.

== Critical reception ==
Professional ratings
Aggregate scores
Source	Rating
Metacritic	82/100
Review scores
Source	Rating
AllMusic	4/5 stars
Exclaim!	9/10
Mojo	4/5 stars
MusicOMH	4/5 stars
Pitchfork	6.9/10

The Consuming Flame received "universal acclaim" according to album review aggregator Metacritic.

== Track listing ==
The individual track titles are not listed on the physical edition or on streaming platforms, but are taken from Thrill Jockey's website.

A Doughnut in the Sky
No.	Title	Length
1.	"Cold Open"	3:37
2.	"I, Voxelman"	2:33
3.	"Moteswarm"	2:57
4.	"Adam's Apple"	4:30
5.	"Athens New Guinea Gas Can Japan"	5:43
6.	"Thyrsus"	4:56
7.	"Circle of Swords"	6:57
8.	"Virgin Unspotted"	2:22
9.	"No Concept"	3:21
10.	"In the Shape of Beasts"	3:56
11.	"Revelatory Mint Clot"	4:38
12.	"Western Clot Rider"	5:30
13.	"Cocktail Party How Glad Am I"	5:00
14.	"I'm Fine I'm Fine"	1:02
Total length:		57:01

On the Team
No.	Title	Length
1.	"Adepts"	5:59
2.	"Maybeism"	2:06
3.	"Garden of Tall Boys"	2:35
4.	"Dancing Your Animal"	2:26
5.	"Nice Men in Stable Relationships"	3:47
6.	"Let Us In"	1:56
7.	"Friendsylum"	3:24
8.	"Io! Lavendar River Karez"	6:58
9.	"The Void at the Center"	5:10
10.	"I Know What I Saw"	3:22
11.	"Sarabande"	6:06
12.	"The Dead City of Telphar"	3:41
13.	"Platformalism"	2:59
14.	"Verminiatures"	1:59
15.	"Reciprocal Realms"	3:24
16.	"Unmastering"	1:01
17.	"I'm on the Team"	2:50
Total length:		59:43

Extraterrestrial Masters
No.	Title	Length
1.	"Blessed Order Of"	7:07
2.	"Floaters"	3:19
3.	"Goodnight Loving Bose Ikard"	4:19
4.	"Tworivers Run"	3:36
5.	"Boomchicka"	13:08
6.	"Extraterrestrial"	5:42
7.	"Circle of Shivers"	3:50
8.	"Out of the Serpent's Mouth"	6:11
9.	"Warm Opening"	2:58
10.	"Decalcomaenads"	1:02
11.	"It Isn't Necessarily the Case"	2:18
12.	"Elsewards"	1:53
13.	"All of the Powers Lie Quiet"	5:47
Total length:		61:10
