= Quasi-Objects =

Studio album by Matmos
- Released: June 16, 1998
- Genre: Electronic
- Length: 39:49
- Label: Vague Terrain

Matmos chronology
Matmos (1997)	Quasi-Objects (1998)	The West (1999)

Professional ratings
Review scores
Source	Rating
AllMusic	3/5 stars

Quasi-Objects is a 1998 electronic music album by Matmos, which followed their self-titled debut. Matmos created the album's music by incorporating ordinary sounds recorded around their home.

== Track listing ==
No.	Title	Length
1.	"Stupid Fambaloo"	4:55
2.	"Cloth Mother/Wire Mother"	5:08
3.	"Schwitt/Urs" (retitled to "Lift Up Your Hat!" on rereleases)	5:05
4.	"Always Three Words"	5:14
5.	"The Banjo's Categorical Gut"	6:07
6.	"The Purple Island"	6:59
7.	"Latex"	7:39

== Reception ==
Quasi-Objects has received mixed reviews from music critics. AllMusic's Sean Cooper called the album "both an improvement [on Matmos' self-titled debut] and a disappointment", with the musicians letting "the schtick of let's-make-tracks-entirely-out-of-weird-noises get the better of their aesthetic judgement." Pitchfork Media's Mark Richard-San similarly described the album as "too reliant on novelty", and thought that its central gimmick "smothered the music."

== Personnel ==
- Design – Rex Ray
- Cover illustration – M.C. Schmidt
- Sequenced by, sampler, synthesizer [W-30, Sh-101, Mono/poly], edited by [digital editing], mixed by, banjo, electric guitar, effects [latex clothing, balloons, whoopee cushion, body sounds, field recording, quasi-objects] – Drew Daniel, M.C. Schmidt
- Written by – Matmos
- Guitar [phone guitar] on track 2 – Tim Furnish
- Slide guitar on track 2 – M.C. Schmidt
