= California Rhinoplasty =

EP by Matmos
- Released: 2001
- Genre: Electronic
- Label: Matador

Professional ratings
Review scores
| Source | Rating |
|---|---|
| AllMusic | 3/5 stars |

"California Rhinoplasty" is a song and an EP by Matmos. The song is originally found on their 2001 album A Chance to Cut Is a Chance to Cure. The recording is composed entirely from samples of plastic surgery performed in California (rhinoplasty, endoscopic forehead lift, chin implants), augmented by a nose flute.

== California Rhinoplasty EP ==
Matmos subsequently released an EP by the same title, featuring their cover of Coil's "Disco Hospital", as well as two contributed remixes of "California Rhinoplasty".

== Track listing ==
1. "California Rhinoplasty" (Drew Daniel, Martin C. Schmidt) – 10:06
2. "Disco Hospital" (John Balance, Peter Christopherson) – 2:28
3. "California Rhinoplasty (Doctor Rockit's Surgery with Complications)" (Daniel, Schmidt) – 7:58
4. "California Rhinoplasty (Surgeon's Second Opinion)" (Daniel, Schmidt) – 6:43

== See also ==
- Musique concrète
