= The Sea and the Bells =

Studio album by Rachel's
- Released: October 22, 1996
- Recorded: July 1995 – April 1996
- Studios: University of Louisville North Recital Hall (Louisville, Kentucky); Chicago Recording Company (Chicago, Illinois); Steve's House of Billiards (Chicago, Illinois); The Juilliard School (New York, New York)
- Genre: Post-rock
- Length: 59:15
- Label: Quarterstick

Rachel's chronology
Music for Egon Schiele (1996)	The Sea and the Bells (1996)	Selenography (1999)

Professional ratings
Review scores
Source	Rating
AllMusic	4.5/5 stars
Spin	7/10

The Sea and the Bells is the third studio album by American post-rock band Rachel's. It was released on October 22, 1996 by Quarterstick Records.

The album was named after and inspired by Pablo Neruda's poetry collection of the same name.

In 2016, The Sea and the Bells was ranked at number 14 on Paste's list of the best post-rock albums, while also placing at number 16 on a similar list by Fact.

== Track listing ==
No.	Title	Writer(s)	Length
1.	"Rhine & Courtesan"	Christian Frederickson; Rachel Grimes; Jason Noble	6:43
2.	"The Voyage of Camille"	Grimes	4:24
3.	"Tea Merchants"	Grimes; Noble	4:56
4.	"Lloyd's Register"	Frederickson; Grimes; Noble	9:49
5.	"With More Air Than Words"	Noble	2:15
6.	"All Is Calm"	Noble	3:20
7.	"Cypress Branches"	Noble	7:44
8.	"The Sirens"	Frederickson	2:21
9.	"Night at Sea"	Noble	3:45
10.	"Letters Home"	Grimes; Noble	3:30
11.	"To Rest Near to You"	Noble	2:49
12.	"The Blue-Skinned Waltz"	Frederickson; Noble	3:15
13.	"His Eyes"	Frederickson; Grimes; Noble	4:24

== Personnel ==
According to the album liner notes:

Rachel's

- Christian Frederickson – viola (1, 2, 4, 6–8, 10, 12, 13), bells (1)
- Rachel Grimes – piano (1, 3, 4, 10, 13), linen sheet (1), conductor (2, 7), vibraphone (6)
- Eve Miller – cello (1, 6), violincello (4, 10, 13)
- Jason Noble – bass (1, 4, 9, 13), vibes (1, 3), linen sheet (1), organ (3), guitars (5, 8, 9, 13), recorders (5), piano (6), tape sounds (7), bells (10), fireworks (11)
- Edward Grimes – drum kit (4, 13)
- Greg King – boatswain

Additional musicians

- Kevin Coultas – drum set (1), timpani (1)
- John Upchurch – clarinet (1, 4, 13), bass clarinet (1, 4, 13), bells (10)
- Robert Weston – bass (1, 4, 13), trumpet (4, 13)
- Thomas Harte – contrabass (2, 7)
- Sarah Hong – cello (2, 7, 12)
- Ann Kim – violin (2, 7, 12)
- Matthew McBride – viola (2, 7, 12)
- Reynard Rott – cello (2, 7, 12)
- Tim Summers – violin (2, 7, 12)
- Jim Maciukenas – musical saw (9)
- John Baker – bells (10)

Technical

- Bob Weston – engineer
- John Loder – mastering
- Greg King – photography and design
- John Noble – photography and design
