= Acetone (album) =

Studio album by Acetone
- Released: 1997
- Length: 56:58
- Label: Vapor
- Producers: Acetone, Scott Campbell

Acetone chronology
If You Only Knew (1996)	Acetone (1997)	York Blvd. (2000)

Acetone is an album by the American band Acetone, released in 1997. It was the band's first album for Neil Young's Vapor Records; Acetone's previous label, Vernon Yard, had declared bankruptcy.

The band supported the album by opening for Spiritualized on its North American tour.

== Production ==
The album was produced by Scott Campbell and Acetone. The band already had songs worked out prior to the recordings sessions, concluding that trying to write songs in the studio had been a mistake during the sessions for their previous album, If You Only Knew. The band was chiefly influenced by jazz and country, and realized that the album's songs would be performed at a faster tempo in a live setting; they also rejected "sadcore" and "slowcore" labels.

== Critical reception ==
Professional ratings
Review scores
Source	Rating
AllMusic	2/5 stars
The Encyclopedia of Popular Music	3/5 stars
The Guardian	3/5 stars
MusicHound Rock: The Essential Album Guide	4/5 stars
Pitchfork	9.2/10
The Times	8/10

Stuart Berman of Pitchfork wrote that "[Richie] Lee's lyric sheet may have been filled with dejection ... but he always sang as if he was looking you in the eyes." A later review by the website's Grayson Haver Currin called the album "focused and intentional in a way the band had never been, sorting through the suffering of survival with tenderness and intensity." The Times declared that "Mark Lightcap's country-tinged guitars are simply gorgeous." The Manchester Evening News dubbed the band "so laid-back they make JJ Cale seem uptight by comparison."

Noting that Acetone "belong somewhere in the slowcore/sadcore area," The Sunday Times thought that "their music isn't just unhurried, it's completely indifferent to the passing of time." The Guardian praised the "homespun, half-speed ballads." The San Antonio Express-News deemed the album "atmospheric pop with a hint of guitar twang and the feeling of a slow-motion undertow".

AllMusic thought that the album "finds the trio sinking deeper into a well of despair, with nothing but sparse guitar pickings, cracked vocals, and shambling rock figures to help." MusicHound Rock: The Essential Album Guide wrote: "Alternately draining and invigorating, the sheer listlessness of songs such as 'Might as Well' and 'Good Life' is resuscitated by the drunk and confident stare of jazz-bar reflection."

== Track listing ==
Acetone track listing
No.	Title	Length
1.	"Every Kiss"	3:58
2.	"All the Time"	3:46
3.	"Germs"	4:44
4.	"Might as Well"	4:14
5.	"Shobud"	6:46
6.	"All You Know"	5:37
7.	"Good Life"	3:52
8.	"Dee"	4:30
9.	"Waltz"	5:37
10.	"Another Minute"	3:55
11.	"So Slow"	3:45
12.	"Chew"	6:14
Total length:		56:58

== Personnel ==
- Steve Hadley – drums
- Richie Lee – lead vocals, backing vocals, bass
- Mark Lightcap – guitar, lead vocals ("Might as Well", "Good Life"), backing vocals
