= Ultimate Care II =

Studio album by Matmos
- Released: February 19, 2016
- Genre: Electroacoustic; musique concrète; sound collage
- Length: 38:06
- Label: Thrill Jockey

Matmos chronology
The Marriage of True Minds (2013)	Ultimate Care II (2016)	Plastic Anniversary (2019)

Professional ratings
Aggregate scores
Source	Rating
Metacritic	76/100
Review scores
Source	Rating
AllMusic	4/5 stars
Exclaim!	8/10
Mixmag	8/10
musicOMH	4/5 stars
Paste	8.5/10
Pitchfork	7.8/10
Record Collector	4/5 stars
Resident Advisor	4.2/5
Spin	8/10
Tiny Mix Tapes	4.5/5 stars

Ultimate Care II is the tenth studio album by experimental electronic music duo Matmos, released on February 19, 2016, on Thrill Jockey.

== Production ==
Ultimate Care II consists entirely of sounds produced by the musicians' Whirlpool Ultimate Care II washing machine, recorded in their basement. It features guest contributors Dan Deacon, Jason Willett from Half Japanese, Max Eilbacher and Sam Haberman from Horse Lords, and Duncan Moore from Needle Gun. The album consists of one 38-minute-long track, described in a press release as depicting "an exploded view of the machine, hearing it in normal operation, but also as an object being rubbed and stroked and drummed upon and prodded and sampled and sequenced and processed by the duo”.

== Reception ==
Upon release, "Ultimate Care II" received "Generally Favourable Reviews" from mainstream music critics. It was given a score of 76 by Metacritic.

== Accolades ==
Publication	Accolade	Year	Rank	Ref.
Pitchfork	The 20 Best Experimental Albums of 2016	2016	—N/a	
The Quietus	Albums of the Year 2016	2016	13	

== Track listing ==
No.	Title	Length
1.	"Ultimate Care II"	38:06
