= Treasure State (album) =

Studio album by Matmos/So Percussion
- Released: July 13, 2010
- Genre: Electronic
- Length: 49:03
- Label: Cantaloupe Music

Matmos chronology
Supreme Balloon (2008)	Treasure State (2010)	The Marriage of True Minds (2013)

So Percussion chronology
Five (and-a-half) Gardens (2007)	Treasure State (2010)	Bad Mango (2011)

Treasure State is a 2010 electronic music album, a collaboration by Matmos and So Percussion.

== Critical reception ==
Professional ratings
Review scores
Source	Rating
Consequence of Sound	C+
Pitchfork Media	7.6/10

Jayson Greene, reviewing the album for Pitchfork Media, wrote that "Matmos have toned down their more outré side for this project" but "they have found marvelous partners in So Percussion, who add unprecedented levels of warmth and dimension to Matmos' busily crawling textures." Adam Kivel of Consequence of Sound gave a mixed review, concluding "if the two halves of the album could be better unified, there’d be a much greater album, but this isn’t bad for a first time collaboration."

== Track listing ==
No.	Title	Length
1.	"Treasure"	4:04
2.	"Water"	7:00
3.	"Needles"	6:01
4.	"Cross"	6:27
5.	"Shard"	6:57
6.	"Swamp"	6:59
7.	"Aluminum"	7:03
8.	"Flame"	4:35
