= The West (album) =

Studio album by Matmos
- Released: 1999
- Genre: Electronic
- Length: 48:55
- Label: Deluxe

Matmos chronology
Quasi-Objects (1998)	The West (1999)	A Chance to Cut Is a Chance to Cure (2001)

Professional ratings
Review scores
Source	Rating
AllMusic	4/5 stars

The West is a 1999 electronic music album by Matmos.

== Track listing ==
No.	Title	Length
1.	"Last Delicious Cigarette"	8:35
2.	"Action At A Distance"	2:46
3.	"Sun On 5 At 152"	10:15
4.	"The West"	21:23
5.	"Tonight, The End"	5:56

== Reception ==
The West received positive reviews from music critics. John Bush, reviewing the album for AllMusic, described it as "seriously done but really playful, groovy even while it's slightly academic sounding, and experimental but undeniably entertaining." Pitchfork's Mark Richardson wrote in 2003 that The West was then considered by many fans to be the duo's masterpiece. He also writes: "The West contains guitar and other stringed instruments that, in places, evoke the Sergio Leone "big sky" of the Western landscape, but it also has a fair amount of abstract electronic noise without any particular association."
