= Blow Buddies =

Gay sex club in San Francisco, California

Coordinates: 37°46′42″N 122°24′9″W

- Interactive map of Blow Buddies
- Address: 933 Harrison Street, San Francisco, California, U.S.

Construction
- Opened: August 8, 1988; 38 years ago
- Closed: March 15, 2020; 6 years ago

Blow Buddies (1988–2020) was the largest gay sex club in San Francisco, California.

== History ==
The club opened in 1988 at 933 Harrison Street and was 6,000 square feet. In 1993, the building was bought by its current owners for US $500,000. In 2019, its building went on the market at US $3.25 million, potentially jeopardizing the club's existence. Its building was constructed in 1953. It is zoned Service/Arts/Light Industrial (SALI) with a 30 ft height limit, so neither housing nor a hotel can be built here, but affordable housing may be constructed.

The following announcement was posted on the Blow Buddies website on July 19, 2020: "Sadly, Blow Buddies will not be reopening after the pandemic. We tried many ways to figure out a path to return and were unsuccessful. We appreciate the willingness of the Leather and LGBTQ Cultural District and our landlord to explore options with us. It was a good run, August 8, 1988 – March 15, 2020. We are sad to see this chapter close. We thank our many members for their support over all those years. The club was created in response to one virus and done in by another."
