= David Hurles =

American pornographer (1944–2023)

- Hurles in 1972
- Born: David Randolph Hurles; September 12, 1944; Cincinnati, Ohio, U.S.
- Died: April 12, 2023 (aged 78); East Hollywood, California, U.S.
- Occupations: Pornographer; photographer
- Years active: 1960s–2008
- Known for: Old Reliable Tape and Picture Company

David Randolph Hurles (September 12, 1944 – April 12, 2023) was an American gay pornographer, whose one-man company, run from a private mailbox, was called Old Reliable Tape and Picture Company. His work, produced primarily in the 1970s and 1980s, falls into three categories: photographs, audio tapes, and videotapes. Hurles' models were typically ex-convicts, hustlers, drifters, and ne'er-do-wells. Hurles died on April 12, 2023, at the age of 78.

== Early years ==
Hurles was born on September 12, 1944, in Cincinnati, Ohio.

In the 1960s, Hurles modeled for films and publications with Guild Press in Washington, D.C., where he also worked as a photographer.

In 1975, already filming in Super-8 format used by his mentor and long-time friend Bob Mizer of Athletic Model Guild, he met and became a great friend of Jack Fritscher, editor of Drummer magazine, who described David as "my longtime pal and housemate". The character Solly Blue in Fritscher's novel Some Dance to Remember has much in common with Hurles, but while they share "archetypal coincidental adventures", Fritscher has denied that Blue is based on Hurles.

Hurles wrote of San Francisco at the time: "Perhaps you had to be there...the 70's, San Francisco, the blossoming and peak of the gay sexual culture. It was a rare time; everything, it seemed, was perfect. So perfect, in fact, that those of us there could not have possibly imagined it might ever be otherwise!" Jim Stewart describes his encounter with Hurles, the neighborhood they both lived in, and the birth of the name Old Reliable in the first chapter of his Folsom Street Blues.

His first published pictures appeared in Drummer, 21 (January 1978); no other magazine would touch them. He also shot many covers and centerfolds for Fritscher's zine Man2Man Quarterly (1980–1982), whose mailing address was Hurles' San Francisco apartment. Subsequently, Hurles' photos appeared in dozens of gay magazines. He moved to Los Angeles shortly thereafter.

== Old Reliable ==
In 1990, Hurles issued a catalogue of his Old Reliable material, a guide to nearly five hundred men and the hundreds of original Old Reliable Video Tapes, as well as the audio cassettes and photos in which the men appear (56 pp.). In 1995, a second volume was published, taking up where the first one left off, also "a guide to nearly 500 men" (64 pp.).

Models were recruited among ex-convicts and drug addicts. As put by admirer John Waters, "David likes psychos. Nude ones. Money-hungry drug addicts with big dicks. Rage-filled robbers without rubbers. And of course, convicts." Many of them were dangerous—he wanted them to be, that was a key part of their attractiveness for him—but part of David's skill, which no one since has duplicated, was being able to manage them so that they would perform as instructed and not attack him. However, Hurles also said: "There have been several thousand models. When they are not in prison, or very married, it has been my practice to stay in touch with many of them, often over decades. They are my friends." On another occasion he said that one of the hardest parts of his job was not getting caught up in the miserable lives of his models.

Although he did not publicize it, sometimes Hurles' models were more mainstream gay pornographic actors. Scott O'Hara made a tape for him, as did Peter O'Brien.

=== Photographs ===
In his photography, Hurles prioritized raw emotion over technical polish. His models, picked up on the street or sent to him by referral, would come to his apartment, get naked, and masturbate. Usually they were shot solo, and with an erection; the amount paid depended on "the size of your dick and whether you could get it up in front of the camera." They were distinguished by "attitude": straight, in your face, angry, contemptuous of fags, dangerous, smoking cigars, giving the finger, flexing their biceps. "Rough trade is too tame a word", wrote John Calendo. Getting robbed by his models, or having his equipment stolen, he viewed as part of the cost of doing business.

Hurles printed his pictures in his own darkroom and filled all orders single-handedly.

Hurles' pictures have been reproduced repeatedly without his permission or compensation. They are used, with permission, as illustrations in two collections of Boyd McDonald's Straight to Hell: The New York Review of Cocksucking material: Meat and Skin. Hurles described McDonald as "the kindest person," who "gave me such encouragement."

His photographs may most easily be consulted in two collections: Speeding, in black and white, then in color Outcast, and to a lesser extent in The Big Penis Book.

=== Audio tapes (cassettes) ===
Besides paying for modeling, Hurles paid many of his models to talk, while alone in a room with the door closed, into an ordinary cassette recorder, typically about how they would like to mistreat gay men. In many cases, he would go on to record a second audio tape in which he sexually serviced the models. Behind the bravado and aggression of the models, there sometimes come through haunting overtones of their failure in life and their awareness of it. There also comes through, at times, their bewildered, demasculinized admiration of Hurles' enthusiasm for sex, for being the bottom, paying to fellate them, paying them to masturbate, buying their orgasms, which feel disturbingly good, although they see themselves as straight. Other models, however, are not threatened at all; they find it enjoyable to exploit Hurles for cash and sex, and "a hole's a hole". Some of the models were openly bisexual or gay, but David preferred straight models.

He released over four hundred of these tapes of verbal sexual abuse. He has "always felt his audiotapes were his finest achievement." Five CDs of selected recordings have been released by Bijou Video.

=== Videotapes ===
With the arrival of home video recording equipment around 1980, David began creating videotapes, eventually releasing over 300. Most were solos, but some were boxing or wrestling among two of his models. Four volumes of "The Best of Old Reliable," plus Tape 43 (Five Days with Phil) and 51 (I, Rick), are available from Ray Dragon Video. The same two, plus four additional D.V.D.s transferred from Old Reliable tapes, are available from Bijou Video: 32 (Hairy Guys), 38 (Arkansas Luggage), 56 (Basic Black #5), and 82 (Boxing 1). Others are available as video-on-demand from Bijou Video; besides the ones just mentioned, these are 25 (Perfect Me), 47 (Men Worth Watching), 49 (Sizzling Solos), 154 (Innocence Explains Nothing), 211 (Ace Is The Place), 269 (Just As They Are), and 277 (Some Old Friends). The first page of a Bijou catalog from 2004, listing 326 no-longer-available V.H.S. tapes and cassette tapes, has been archived. Another former catalog has been archived on the Wayback Machine.

== Writing ==
Hurles and Fritscher co-authored an interview with "Scott Smith", an ex-convict from Soledad Prison.

Hurles wrote an introduction: "A Thousand Light Years Ago: Drummer", to "Gay San Francisco: Eyewitness Drummer", Volume 1. A Memoir of the Sex, Art, Salon, Pop Culture War, and Gay History of Drummer Magazine.

Hurles' memoirs, drafted in 1992 as No Title Necessary: A Few Notes, Comments, and Observations, have not been published.

== Later years ==
An accident in 1990 led to the gradual loss of eyesight in one eye. Shortly thereafter, the arrival of pornography on the Internet destroyed most of the market for Hurles' material, at the same time that AIDS (and drugs) killed many models and potential models. "I know where a great many of them [my models] are. Six feet under". His company folded, and he lived on welfare and food stamps. In 2008 he had a massive stroke, and more recently "is the most popular resident of a state-funded nursing home in East Hollywood".

== Influence ==
John Waters declared himself influenced by Hurles and dedicated a part of a chapter in his Role Models to him, stating that "The wonderful, beautiful, scary life of David Hurles has been an inspiration to my inner filth for years". According to him, "David Hurles's photographs forever scarred some gay men's ability to be attracted to another average gay men. Without these pioneering Old Reliable photographs, homoeroticism in the art world couldn't have existed. Robert Mapplethorpe was a pussy. Mr. Hurles is the real thing." (Note: According to Fritscher, Mapplethorpe collected Old Reliable photos.) With Dian Hanson, John Waters curated an exhibition of David Hurles' photos, "Outsider Porn: The Photos of David Hurles," at the Marianne Boesky gallery in New York, June 4–25, 2010. Another exhibit, "Straight to Hell Presents: In Cock We Trust", was presented in 2008 at the Berlin art gallery Exile.

Sex-positive feminist Susie Bright has also declared herself a fan of Hurles.

His friend Dian Hanson, who manages his financial affairs and the Old Reliable archive, described him as an "intelligent, funny, mild mannered guy who studied his models the way I'd studied my readers all the years I worked making men's magazines. David is a true intellectual, a psychological hobbyist, and even more interesting as a person than he is as a photographer. He says we're "simpatico", and that seems the best description for the way we clicked immediately, sharing a taste in men and in exploring the intricacies of human psychology and sexual attraction."

== Archival material ==
ONE National Gay & Lesbian Archives, USC Libraries, University of Southern California, has VHS videotapes of a nine-part interview conducted from August 18 to December 29, 1998, and 6 compact audiocassette tapes of what appears to be a four-part interview conducted on January 12, 1999. The collection also contains two compilation CD-ROMs, copyright 1998, of Old Reliable photographs: "As Seen from the Rear ... the Butt CD!" and "Sometimes a Cigar is Just a Cigar!" The interviews were conducted by Pat Allen, with the assistance of Bill Wyman.

== See also ==
- Boyd McDonald (pornographer)
