= Christopher Castiglia =

American literary scholar

Christopher Castiglia (born May 14, 1960) is an American literary scholar and Distinguished Professor of English and Women's, Gender, and Sexuality Studies at the Pennsylvania State University.
