= The Rose Has Teeth in the Mouth of a Beast =

Studio album by Matmos
- Released: May 9, 2006
- Genres: Electronic; musique concrète
- Length: 61:28
- Label: Matador Records
- Producers: Drew Daniel, Martin Schmidt

Matmos chronology
The Civil War (2003)	The Rose Has Teeth in the Mouth of a Beast (2006)	Supreme Balloon (2008)

Professional ratings
Aggregate scores
Source	Rating
Metacritic	81/100
Review scores
Source	Rating
AllMusic	4.5/5 stars
Alternative Press	5/5 stars
The A.V. Club	A
Drowned in Sound	8/10
Mojo	4/5 stars
Pitchfork	8.0/10
PopMatters	7/10
Slant Magazine	2.5/5 stars
Stylus	B+
Uncut	8/10

The Rose Has Teeth in the Mouth of a Beast is the sixth studio album by Matmos. Each of the album's songs is dedicated to a notable gay or lesbian person who has influenced the duo, and this influence is reflected in the songs themselves. For examples, "Rag for William S. Burroughs" features the clatter of a type writer and a gunshot, representing the William Tell incident, and "Tract for Valerie Solanas" contains excerpts from the SCUM Manifesto.

As with earlier releases, the duo make use of field recordings in the music, recordings that range from ordinary things to more absurd sounds, such as a recording of a bovine uterus. The album's title is taken from a line in Ludwig Wittgenstein's Philosophical Investigations.

== Critical reception ==
The Rose Has Teeth in the Mouth of a Beast received positive reviews from music critics. Review aggregator website Metacritic gives it a score of 81 out of 100 based on 22 critics, indicating "universal acclaim". Brandon Stosuy, writing for Pitchfork, wrote in a positive review that "there are a few moments when the concept's cooler than the result, but in general The Rose Has Teeth's experiments result in frenetic dance tracks doubling as reading lists."

Jonathan Keefe, writing for Slant Magazine, called the album "endlessly fascinating" but concluded that "even armed with a cheat sheet from Wikipedia and a desire to figure out the significance of every last hair clipper and gunshot, the album never engages as anything more than an academic exercise."

Pitchfork placed it at number 47 on the "Top 50 Albums of 2006" list.

== Track listing ==
No.	Title	Notes	Length
1.	"Roses and Teeth for Ludwig Wittgenstein"	Credits: Guitar [twang guitar], Performer [electronics] – Jay Lesser; Performer [cow recordings, goose call], Mixed By – M.C. Schmidt; Performer [roses, teeth, manure, sampling, sequencing, digital editing] – Drew Daniel; Voice [excerpts from Ludwig Wittgenstein's Philosophical Investigations read aloud by] – Björk Guðmundsdóttir, Laetitia Sonami, Marcus Schmickler, Rose McKereghan, Werner Phillip Schmidt, Zum Zoom	3:24
2.	"Steam and Sequins for Larry Levan"	Credits: Drums – Steve Goodfriend; Guitar [electric guitar], Horns [peck horn], Trumpet – Mark Lightcap; Performer [electronics] – John Talaga; Performer [steam, sewing machine, sequins, Arp 2600, sampling, sequencing, digital editing] – Drew Daniel; Performer [V-synth, tambourine, shaker, saucepan], Mixed By – M.C. Schmidt; Synthesizer [Arp 2600] – Matthew Curry; Voice – Kalonica McQuesten	5:20
3.	"Tract for Valerie Solanas"	Credits: Performer [cow uterus, reproductive tract, vagina, vacuum cleaner, plastic gloves], Mixed By – M.C. Schmidt; Performer [sampling, sequencing, digital editing, machete, scissors, knives, paper, Personal alarms (rape alarms)] – Drew Daniel; Voice [excerpts from Valerie Solanas' The SCUM Manifesto read by] – Barbara Golden, Yalie Kumara	5:07
4.	"Public Sex for Boyd McDonald"	Credits: Drums – Steve Goodfriend; Guitar [electric guitar], Trumpet – Mark Lightcap; Performer [pen, paper, typewriter, videotape, sampling, sequencing, digital editing, Arp 2600] – Drew Daniel; Saxophone – Stephen Thrower; Synthesizer [Arp 2600, Sh 101, V-synth, Juno 6], Performer [Videotape], Mixed By – M.C. Schmidt	5:52
5.	"Semen Song for James Bidgood"	Credits: Arranged By [String Arrangement] – Jefferson Friedman; Cello – Clarice Jensen; Harp – Zeena Parkins; Keyboards [V-synth, piano], Performer [sampling, sequencing], Mixed By – M.C. Schmidt; Performer [file transfers, effects] – Jon Leidecker; Performer [sampling, sequencing, digital editing, toilet paper roll panflute, paper, semen] – Drew Daniel; Piano – Matthew Fuerst; Strings – American Contemporary Music Ensemble; Viola – Bridget Fitzgerald; Violin – Erik Carlson, Miranda Cuckson; Voice – Anohni Hegarty	5:02
6.	"Snails and Lasers for Patricia Highsmith"	Credits: Double bass – Brian O'Reilly; Drums – Steve Goodfriend; French horn – Amy Vaillancourt; Performer [sampling, sequencing, digital editing] – Drew Daniel; Performer [sequencing, V-synth, Ms2000, books, brushes, live garden snails, glass cylinder, Light-sensitive theremin], Mixed By – M.C. Schmidt	5:52
7.	"Germs Burn for Darby Crash"	Credits: Performer [Arp 2600, Wahl hair clipper, hair] – M.C. Schmidt; Performer [lighter, cigarette] – Don Bolles; Performer [sampling, sequencing, digital editing, burnt flesh, cry of pain] – Drew Daniel	4:10
8.	"Solo Buttons for Joe Meek"	Credits: Arranged By [String Arrangement] – Lev "Ljova" Zhurbin; Bass – Jay Lesser; Cello – Jeffrey Zeigler; Drums – Steve Goodfriend; Guitar – Mark Lightcap; Performer [tapes, synths, sampling, sequencing, digital editing] – Drew Daniel; Performer [whinging] – M.C. Schmidt; Strings – Kronos Quartet; Viola – Hank Dutt; Violin – David Harrington, John Sherba	3:33
9.	"Rag for William S. Burroughs"	Credits: Goblet Drum [darbuka] – Darcy Bartoletti; Performer [amateur piano, sampling, V-synth, sequencing, tape recorder, typewriter, vacuum cleaner tube, horn] – M.C. Schmidt; Performer [Burroughs adding machines, film projectors] – Michael Brown; Performer [electronics] – Jay Lesser; Performer [Heidelberg windmill, Chandler And Price printing presses] – Leif Fairfield; Performer [sampling, sequencing, digital editing, bombard, tape recorder, shortwave radio, marbles, keys, Efx] – Drew Daniel; Trumpet – Mark Lightcap; Violin – Blevin Blectum	13:52
10.	"Banquet for King Ludwig II of Bavaria"	Credits: Drums, Percussion [sleighbells] – Steve Goodfriend; French horn – Amy Vaillancourt; Performer [glassware, dishes, coconuts, sampling, sequencing, V-synth] – M.C. Schmidt; Performer [glassware, dishes, sampling, sequencing, digital editing] – Drew Daniel; Tuba, Horns [peck horn], Performer [plastic tube] – Mark Lightcap; Voice – Maja S. K. Ratkje	3:23

Japanese edition bonus track
No.	Title	Length
11.	"Kendo for Yukio Mishima"	5:54

== Charts ==
Chart	Peak position
US Top Dance Albums (Billboard)	21
