= If You Only Knew (Acetone album) =

Studio album by Acetone
- Released: 1996
- Genre: Rock
- Label: Vernon Yard

Acetone chronology
I Guess I Would (1995)	If You Only Knew (1996)	Acetone (1997)

If You Only Knew is an album by the American band Acetone, released in 1996. It was their final album for Vernon Yard Recordings. The band supported the album with a North American tour.

== Production ==
The album was recorded partly in Nashville, along with the 1995 covers EP, I Guess I Would. Acetone composed its songs in the studio, a process they decided not to repeat on their next album, Acetone. The band's songwriting was influenced by Memphis soul and country music; guitarist Mark Lightcap later said that the slower tempos were in part the result of some bandmembers' drug abuse. Many of the songs are about problematic romantic relationships.

== Critical reception ==
Professional ratings
Review scores
Source	Rating
AllMusic	4/5 stars
Edmonton Journal	4.5/5 stars
The Great Alternative & Indie Discography	5/10
MusicHound Rock: The Essential Album Guide	3.5/5 stars
Pitchfork	8.5/10
The Virgin Encyclopedia of Nineties Music	3/5 stars

The Edmonton Journal opined that "Acetone comes off like Chris Isaak on downers, or a more cohesive Velvet Underground ... Steve Hadley shuffles subtly on drums, rarely breaking that beat-per-second limit, while guitarist Mark Lightcap noodles along dreamily"; the paper later listed If You Only Knew as one of the best albums of 1996. The Gazette said that the band "takes the long and winding road through an atmospheric set of the Snooze Blues, the Coma Country." The Record concluded that "the druggy tempos and lethargic vocals, with the barest hint of Southern rock rhythms, make for an absolutely perfect Big Star Third clone on the title track".

The Province stated that "lilting, soft melodies are mixed with breathy lo-fi vocals to great success". The Rocket noted that "the slow motion, psych wander that Acetone have mastered shows off ropy trails of guitars, simple but effective drumming, and lost in the desert, deadpan vocals." CMJ New Music Monthly called the album "blurry-eyed rock [that] blends lethargic rhythms and lithe melodies". In 2023, Uncut said that "while some of [Richie] Lee's vocals sometimes feel a little lost and distant on the album, the band are capable of creating swirling atmospherics and hypnotic grooves".

== Track listing ==
No.	Title	Length
1.	"If You Only Knew"
2.	"I Don't Really Care"
3.	"In the Light"
4.	"I've Enjoyed as Much of This as I Can Stand"
5.	"The Final Say"
6.	"When You're Gone"
7.	"Hound Dog"
8.	"99"
9.	"What I See"
10.	"Nothing at All"
11.	"Esque"
12.	"Always Late"

== Personnel ==
- Richie Lee – bass, lead vocals
- Mark Lightcap – guitar, backing vocals
- Steve Hadley – drums
