= The Civil War (album) =

Studio album by Matmos
- Released: September 23, 2003
- Genre: Electronica
- Length: 45:52
- Label: Matador
- Producer: Matmos

Matmos chronology
A Chance to Cut Is a Chance to Cure (2001)	The Civil War (2003)	The Rose Has Teeth in the Mouth of a Beast (2006)

Professional ratings
Aggregate scores
Source	Rating
Metacritic	77/100
Review scores
Source	Rating
AllMusic	4.5/5 stars
Alternative Press	5/5 stars
The Guardian	3/5 stars
Pitchfork	7.3/10
Playlouder	3.5/5 stars
Q	3.5/5 stars
Rolling Stone	3/5 stars
Stylus	8.2/10
Tiny Mix Tapes	4.5/5 stars
Uncut	5/5 stars

The Civil War is the fifth studio album by experimental duo Matmos, released via Matador Records. It explores the boundaries between Americana, Medieval folk music and electronica. It features many live instruments such as drums, brass and guitars. A hurdy-gurdy is also sampled. There is also a satirical take on "Stars and Stripes Forever".

== Critical reception ==
Review aggregator website Metacritic gives The Civil War a score of 77 out of 100 based on 22 critics, indicating "generally favorable reviews".

Heather Phares of AllMusic gave the album 4.5 stars out of 5, calling it "an album whose subtly oxymoronic title suggests the inherent contradictions of its sound." Mark Richardson of Pitchfork gave the album a 7.3 out of 10, saying, "As a technical achievement and as a piece of pure sound, The Civil War is inarguably Matmos' best record."

== Track listing ==
No.	Title	Length
1.	"Regicide"	2:47
2.	"Zealous Order of Candied Knights"	4:36
3.	"Reconstruction"	9:31
4.	"Y.T.T.E. (Yield to Total Elation)"	9:08
5.	"For the Trees"	3:31
6.	"The Stars and Stripes Forever"	2:07
7.	"Pelt and Holler"	4:17
8.	"The Struggle Against Unreality Begins"	5:34
9.	"For the Trees (Return)"	4:15

Japanese edition bonus track
No.	Title	Length
10.	"Cabin in the Sky"	9:03
