= Handwriting (album) =

Studio album by Rachel's
- Released: May 23, 1995 (U.S.)
- Recorded: Spring 1991 – October 1994
- Genre: Chamber music, post-rock
- Length: 43:50
- Label: Quarterstick

Rachel's chronology
Handwriting (1995)	Music for Egon Schiele (1996)

Professional ratings
Review scores
Source	Rating
AllMusic	4/5 stars
The Encyclopedia of Popular Music	4/5 stars
Tiny Mix Tapes	4.5/5 stars

Handwriting is the debut album by the instrumental group Rachel's. It was released in May 1995 on Quarterstick Records.

== Critical reception ==
Trouser Press wrote: "Using vibes, winds and traps, 'M. Daguerre' is the closest to jazz the ensemble gets, but the song’s main theme gives way to effective, unsettling improv, as well as delicate passages led by [Rachel] Grimes’ piano and a string section."

== Track listing ==
1. "Southbound to Marion" – 3:11
2. "M. Daguerre" – 11:28
3. "Saccharin" – 7:04
4. "Frida Kahlo" – 1:53
5. "Seratonin" – 3:34
6. "Full on Night" – 14:32
7. "Handwriting" – 1:48

== Personnel ==
- Richard Barber – contra bass
- Nat Barrett – cello
- Marnie Christensen – violin
- Kevin Coultas – drum kit
- Christian Frederickson – viola
- Mark Greenberg – vibraphone
- Rachel Grimes – piano
- Gregory King – hand drums
- Michael Kurth – double bass
- Eve Miller – cello
- Jeff Mueller – orator
- Jason B. Noble – electric bass, guitars, tapes
- Barry Phipps – upright bass
- Jacob Pine – violin
- John Upchurch – clarinet, bass clarinet
- Bob Weston – double bass, electric bass
