= A Chance to Cut Is a Chance to Cure =

Studio album by Matmos
- Released: March 13, 2001
- Genre: IDM
- Length: 46:17
- Label: Matador

Matmos chronology
The West (1999)	A Chance to Cut Is a Chance to Cure (2001)	The Civil War (2003)

A Chance to Cut Is a Chance to Cure is the fourth studio album by American electronic music duo Matmos, released in 2001. The album consists primarily of samples of medical procedures, including plastic surgeries, liposuctions, hearing tests and bonesaws. The album maintains a sense of humour in contrast with the serious nature of the audio being sampled. The exception to the medical samples is the song "For Felix (And All the Rats)", a piece dedicated to their deceased pet rat Felix, performed entirely on his cage.

The two members of Matmos, Drew Daniel and Martin Schmidt, both had doctors as parents, a fact that likely influenced them in the album's creation. The album is sometimes considered a concept album within the glitch or musique concrète genre.

== Critical reception ==
Professional ratings
Aggregate scores
Source	Rating
Metacritic	80/100
Review scores
Source	Rating
AllMusic	4.5/5 stars
Alternative Press	4/5 stars
The Guardian	3/5 stars
Mojo	3.5/5 stars
Muzik	4/5
NME	8/10
Pitchfork	8.8/10
Q	3/5 stars
Spin	8/10
Stylus	A−

At Metacritic, which assigns a weighted average score out of 100 to reviews from mainstream critics, A Chance to Cut Is a Chance to Cure received an average score of 80 based on 13 reviews, indicating "generally favorable reviews". Heather Phares of AllMusic described the album as "seven remarkably accessible, melodic pieces of experimental techno." Simon Reynolds of Spin said, "Matmos have captured with discomforting vividness the sheer surrealism of the modern vanity industry, the medieval tortures people gladly endure in pursuit of physical perfection."

In 2017, Pitchfork placed A Chance to Cut Is a Chance to Cure at number 19 on its list of "The 50 Best IDM Albums of All Time".

== Track listing ==
No.	Title	Length
1.	"Lipostudio...And So On"	5:35
2.	"L.A.S.I.K."	3:57
3.	"Spondee"	6:15
4.	"Ur Tchun Tan Tse Qi"	5:05
5.	"For Felix (And All the Rats)"	7:52
6.	"Memento Mori"	7:32
7.	"California Rhinoplasty"	10:00

Japanese edition bonus track
No.	Title	Length
8.	"Cymbals & Aspirin (A Breakthrough in Pain Relief)"	9:02

== Personnel ==
Credits adapted from liner notes.

Matmos

- M. C. Schmidt – straw and water (1), acoustic guitar (1), electric guitar (1, 3), voice (1, 3), test tones (3), synthesizer (3), acupuncture point detector (4), skin (4), plucked and bowed rat cage (5), sequencing (5, 7), human skull (6), goat spine (6), teeth (6), flute (7), computer (7), mixing
- Drew Daniel – voice (1), electric guitar (1, 3), sound effects (3), digital editing, sequencing, sampling, editing, mixing, recording

Additional musicians

- Katie Williams – voice (1)
- J Lesser – voice (1)
- Blevin Blectum – voice (1)
- Felix Kubin – voice (1)
- Hrvatski – voice (1)
- Miguel De Pedro – voice (1)
- Stefanie Ressin – voice (1)
- Richard Von Der Schulenburg – voice (1)
- Katerina Von Ledersteger-Goodfriend – voice (1)
- Kevin Ambrosini – voice (1)
- Ethel Chang – voice (1)
- Joanne Feinstein – voice (1)
- Quang Hong – voice (1)
- David Hornung – voice (1)
- Emily Hsu – voice (1)
- Matt Kaufman – voice (1)
- Daisy Kent – voice (1)
- Blake Linney – voice (1)
- Junn-Francis Masongsong – voice (1)
- Lee Medoff – voice (1)
- Jerome Narvaez – voice (1)
- Ryan Petersen – voice (1)
- Brian Schultz – voice (1)
- Cody Shedd – voice (1)
- Robert Sproul – voice (1)
- Jennifer Tom – voice (1)
- Nicole Williamson – voice (1)
- Stephen Thrower – clarinet (1)
- Steve Goodfriend – drums (1)
- Mark Lightcap – electric guitar (1), ukulele (3)
- Rebecca Highlander – voice (3)
