= Matmos =

American electronic music duo

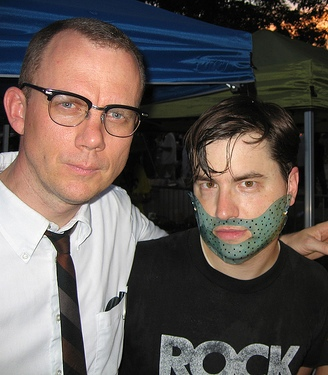
- M. C. Schmidt (left) and Drew Daniel at the 2006 Pitchfork Music Festival in Chicago

Background information
- Origin: San Francisco, U.S.
- Genres: Electronic; experimental; glitch; ambient techno; IDM; post-industrial
- Years active: 1995–present
- Labels: Matador; Thrill Jockey; Smithsonian Folkways
- Spinoffs: The Soft Pink Truth; Disc
- Members: M.C. Schmidt; Drew Daniel
- Website: Official Site

Matmos is an experimental electronic music duo formed in San Francisco and based in Baltimore. M. C. (Martin) Schmidt and Drew Daniel are the core members, but they frequently include other artists on their records and in their performances notably including J Lesser. Apart from releasing twelve full-length studio albums and numerous collaborative works, Matmos is also well known for their collaboration with Icelandic singer and musician Björk, both on studio recordings and live tours. After being signed to Matador Records for nine years, Matmos signed with Thrill Jockey in 2012. The name Matmos refers to the seething lake of evil slime beneath the city Sogo in the 1968 film Barbarella.

== Notable work ==
In 1998, Matmos remixed the Björk single "Alarm Call". Then the duo worked with Björk on her albums Vespertine (2001) and Medúlla (2004), as well as the Vespertine and Greatest Hits tours. In November 2004, Matmos spent 97 hours in the Yerba Buena Center for the Arts as artists-in-residence, performing music with friends, musical guests and onlookers. The live album Work, Work, Work, essentially a "best of" collection of the session, was released as a free download on their website.

Matmos gained notoriety for their use of unconventional samples including "freshly cut hair" and "the amplified neural activity of crayfish" on their first album and "recorded the snips, clicks, snaps, and squelches of various surgical procedures, then nipped and tucked them into seven remarkably accessible, melodic pieces of experimental techno" for their album A Chance to Cut Is a Chance to Cure. In 2011, Matmos participated in a programmed evening of events with the visual arts organisation Auto Italia South East. The event was produced in collaboration with record label Upset The Rhythm and included contributions from experimental electronic musicians John Wiese and Birds of Delay. Matmos have since collaborated with a large number of visual artists and arts organisations, including Cafe Oto and Metal.

In 2015, Matmos appeared in Soundhunters, a documentary directed by Beryl Koltz and broadcast on the Franco-German channel arte as well as on many channels abroad. In September 2023, the duo announced their album Return to Archive would be released marking the seventy-fifth anniversary of the Smithsonian Folkways label, with a three-hour free concert at the Hirshhorn Museum in Washington, D.C. in which they remixed field recordings from the label's catalogue in octophonic sound.

=== Hit em ===
Drew Daniel
(@DDDrewDaniel)
tweeted:

had a dream I was at a rave talking to a girl and she told me about a genre called “hit em” that is in 5/4 time at 212 bpm with super crunched out sounds thank you dream girl

Jul 29, 2024

In 2024, Daniel tweeted about a new musical genre called 'Hit Em' which he claims to have learned about during a dream while he was asleep; in the tweet he described the genre to be fixed at 212 BPM and 5/4 time signature. The post went viral, with electronic music producers attempting to create examples of the fictional genre.

== Personal lives ==
Schmidt and Daniel are a couple. Daniel received a Ph.D. in English from the University of California, Berkeley with a dissertation on the literary cult of melancholy directed by Janet Adelman. He is an associate professor in the English department at Johns Hopkins University in Baltimore. That had the band moving from San Francisco to Baltimore in August 2007. Daniel also has a personal dance music project, the Soft Pink Truth. He is a contributing writer to Pitchfork, an online magazine, and he wrote the 33 1/3 book about Throbbing Gristle's 1979 album 20 Jazz Funk Greats in addition to two books of literary criticism.

Schmidt formerly worked as a teacher in the New Genres Department at the San Francisco Art Institute, and is a professor of music technology at Johns Hopkins University's Peabody Institute and the president of the High Zero Foundation, which organizes Baltimore's annual High Zero festival of improvised music. Both Schmidt and Daniel appeared in the Carl Sagan music short Unseen Forces by Ryan Junell.

== Discography ==
=== Albums ===
Matmos albums
Year	Album details
1997	Matmos: Released: 1997; Label: Vague Terrain
1998	Quasi-Objects: Released: June 16, 1998; Label: Vague Terrain
1999	The West: Released: 1999; Label: Deluxe
2001	A Chance to Cut Is a Chance to Cure: Released: March 13, 2001; Label: Matador
2003	The Civil War: Released: September 23, 2003; Label: Matador
2006	The Rose Has Teeth in the Mouth of a Beast: Released: May 9, 2006; Label: Matador
2008	Supreme Balloon: Released: May 6, 2008; Label: Matador
2010	Treasure State (with So Percussion): Released: July 13, 2010; Label: Cantaloupe Music
2013	The Marriage of True Minds: Released: February 19, 2013; Label: Thrill Jockey
2016	Ultimate Care II: Released: February 19, 2016; Label: Thrill Jockey
2019	Plastic Anniversary: Released: March 15, 2019; Label: Thrill Jockey
2020	The Consuming Flame: Open Exercises in Group Form: Released: August 21, 2020; Label: Thrill Jockey
2022	Regards/Ukłony dla Bogusław Schaeffer: Released: May 20, 2022; Label: Thrill Jockey
2023	Return to Archive: Released: November 3, 2023; Label: Smithsonian Folkways
2025	Metallic Life Review: Released: June 20, 2025; Label: Thrill Jockey

=== EPs ===
- Full On Night Split Disc with Rachel's (2000, Quarterstick)
- California Rhinoplasty (2001 Feb 12, OLE-501)
- Rat Relocation Program (2004)
- For Alan Turing (2006)
- The Ganzfeld EP (2012, on Thrill Jockey 315)

=== Limited edition ===
- Matmos Live with J Lesser (2002)
- A Viable Alternative to Actual Sexual Contact, as Vague Terrain Recordings (2002, Piehead Records)
- "A Paradise of Dainty Devices: interludes, micromedia & sound edits" (limited edition of 100, for their "Wet Hot EuroAmerican Summer Tour", 2007)
- Polychords : Promo Single released on Matador
- I Want Snowden/Sheremetyevo Breakdown Blues, split single with the Disco Yahtzee Empire (2013)
