= Rachel's =

American chamber music group (1991–2012)

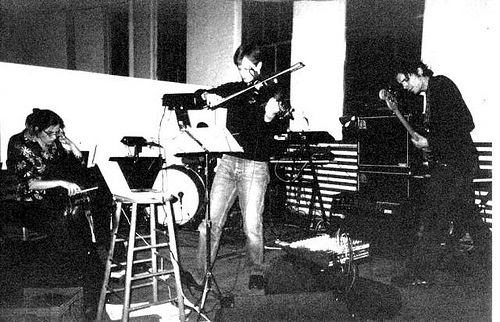

Background information
- Origin: Louisville, Kentucky, U.S.
- Genres: Instrumental, post-rock, minimalism, chamber music
- Years active: 1991–2012
- Label: Quarterstick
- Past members: Christian Frederickson; Rachel Grimes; Greg King; Eve Miller; Jason Noble (Deceased); Edward Grimes (Deceased)
- Website: Official site

Rachel's was an American musical group that formed in Louisville, Kentucky, in 1991. The group was founded and led by guitarist Jason Noble and parallel to membership in Rodan. Their style was largely instrumental, and often classified as a fusion of chamber music, post rock and minimalism.

Noble initially played music individually under the monicker Rachel's, but later began collaborating with core members violist Christian Frederickson and pianist Rachel Grimes. While the trio formed the core part of the band, the group's recordings and performances featured a varying ensemble of musicians, who played a range of string instruments (including viola and cello) in combination with piano, guitars, electric bass guitar, and a drum set that included a large orchestral bass drum.

The group's work was strongly influenced by classical music, particularly inspired by the minimalist music of the late 20th century, particularly English composer Michael Nyman.

A profile of the band is included in the book Second-Hand Stories: 15 Portraits of Louisville by Michael L. Jones.

Noble died of cancer on August 4, 2012, and Edward Grimes (the band's longtime drummer) died on March 25, 2017.

== Discography ==
- Handwriting (1995, Quarterstick Records)
- Music for Egon Schiele (1996, Quarterstick)
- The Sea and the Bells (1996, Quarterstick)
- Selenography (1999, Quarterstick)
- Full On Night Split disc with Matmos (2000, Quarterstick)
- Significant Others (2002, Tour-only CD available at ATP)
- Systems/Layers (2003, Quarterstick)
- Technology Is Killing Music EP (2005, Three Lobed Recordings)

== Band members ==
- Christian Frederickson – viola
- Edward Grimes – percussion, vibraphone (deceased)
- Rachel Grimes – piano, organ
- Greg King – vibraphone, djembe, film projections
- Eve Miller – cello
- Jason Noble – guitar, bass (deceased)

== Name ==
The name "Rachel's" followed on an earlier project some of the band members had created, a tape called Rachel's Halo. "Rachel" was a reference to Sean Young's character in the film Blade Runner.

== Contemporary usage ==
The Rachel's song "Water from the Same Source" was featured in the movie Hancock, although it did not appear on the official soundtrack, and in the Italian film The Great Beauty. Furthermore, "Water from the Same Source" was featured in Kirby Ferguson's fourth installment of his Everything is a Remix series. Their song "Even/odd" was used in Reha Erdem's film Kosmos. "Lloyd's Register", from the album The Sea and the Bells, made it into the French movie Une liaison pornographique. Their song "An Evening Of Long Goodbyes" provided the inspiration for the title of Paul Murray's novel of that name. The 2017 satirical war film War Machine features "NY Snow Globe".

== See also ==
- List of post-rock bands
