= Kill Sound Before Sound Kills You =

Studio album by Kid 606
- Released: 2003
- Recorded: 1998–2003
- Length: 51:58
- Label: Ipecac
- Producer: Miguel Depedro

Kid 606 chronology
The Action Packed Mentallist Brings You the Fucking Jams (2002)	Kill Sound Before Sound Kills You (2003)	Who Still Kill Sound? (2004)

Kill Sound Before Sound Kills You is a 2003 studio album by American electronic musician Miguel Depedro under his alias of Kid 606. The album was released by Ipecac Records on compact disc and on vinyl by Tigerbeat6. The album was recorded between 1998 and 2003 and features guest vocalist Wayne Lonesome. To promote the album, the EP The Illness was released in July 2003 as well as a music video for "The Illness" made by Joel Trussell.

On its release, the album received both positive and negative reception. The more positive reviews referred to the album as the best Kid 606 album released to date while Allmusic, CMJ and Stylus Magazine referred to it as one of the best releases of 2003. Criticism came from Spin and The A.V. Club who had mixed feelings on how the album adapted the older style of electronic music.

== Production ==
The music on Kill Sound Before Sound Kills You was recorded between 1998 and 2003. The majority of the songs from the album were created by organizing the ideas for the song in Logic and then taken to Depedro's desktop where he ran separate outs of the MOTU 2408 and ran individual channels through external filters and delays. The album features vocals from Wayne Lonesome on the track "Buckle Up". Lonesome was introduced to Depedro by British musician Kevin Martin. Depedro stated that he "really liked the tracks The Bug did with Wayne Lonesome, but I don’t get along with Wayne and didn't like working with him."

== Style ==
Kill Sound Before Sound Kills You has a different sound than the previous Kid 606 albums such as the Mille Plateaux ambient style of P.S. I Love You and the mashup style of The Action Packed Mentallist Brings You the Fucking Jams. The A.V. Club described the album as a "working history of spastic club music, from rave-era hardcore to jungle to gabba" The majority of Kill Sound... was described by PopMatters as "chaotic mix of cartoon samples, glitched-out grooves, and sputtering synthesizers" Stylus Magazine described the album as having a "giddy sense of humour" and that "Depredo has always been a bit of a prankster when it comes to his music".

The album also contains more mellow tracks, such as "If I Had A Happy Place This Would Be It". "Andy Warhol Is Dead But We Still Have Hope" has string segments over glitch music. Another track that includes the more relaxed style include "Parenthood".

== Release ==
Kill Sound Before Sound Kills You was released in 2003. Sources disagree on the exact date, ranging from October 27, November 3, and November 4, 2003. To promote the album, an EP titled The Illness was released in July 2003. The Illness was originally meant to be a teaser single, but was expanded into an EP format. The album was issued on a double vinyl record by Tigerbeat6 Records. A music video was made for the track "The Illness" directed by Joel Trussell. Trussell created the video with Flash, Photoshop and Adobe Premiere Pro.

== Reception ==
Professional ratings
Review scores
Source	Rating
Allmusic	4.5/5 stars
The A.V. Club	(Negative)
BBC	(Negative)
CMJ	(Positive)
Entertainment Weekly	B
PopMatters	(Positive)
Q	3/5 stars
Spin	B+
Stylus	A−
Uncut	3/5 stars

Allmusic gave the album a four and a half star rating out of five, referring to it as "one of the most energized dance records of the year" and "his best record yet and a work that makes it clear Kid606 has no boundaries to contain his creativity." The review went on to praise it as "as imaginative and active as similarly great nü-hardcore sets from DJ /rupture and Todd Osborne's Soundmurderer, but more organized and efficient as well" Stylus gave the album an A− rating, calling it Depedro's "best work and one of the best electronic albums all year" PopMatters also gave the album a positive review, noting "what makes this album continually exciting, versatile, and will ultimately make you reach for it time and time again is that Kid 606 never once rehashes ideas or sounds stale." Entertainment Weekly stated that listening to previous Kid606 albums "was like jamming a screwdriver into your cortex" while Kill Sound album "which favors songwriting over pretension -- is a revelation [...] It's intelligent dance music without the footnotes". The College Music Journal praised the album, citing a "massive amount of substance to each track" and that "Depedro has made one of 2003's finest albums." PlayLouder gave the album a four out of five rating, stating that Kid606 "is still worth your time. He still sounds fresh."

Some critics had a negative reception to the older styled sound on the album. Spin gave the album a B+ rating, questioning how much genuine affection Depedro had for the style of music he was making, but stated that "his piss-take rocks". The A.V. Club noted that "For tracks so hyperactive, they hold together well: The grafted samples sound more like complements than disparate shards, and the beats follow an internal logic even when they spin out of time. But Kill Sound doesn't work as much more than a framing device–it derives too much of its effect from old thrills." The BBC stated that "the more upbeat tracks at least create some worthwhile and fun DJ fodder, the slower tracks sadly fail to impress" finding that "Andy Warhol Is Dead But We Can Still Have Hope" was too similar to Depedro's work on P.S. You Love Me and that "as a whole ultimately becomes just another disposable product for the ADD generation"

Later reception of the album was mentioned on Depedro's's follow-up album Who Still Kill Sound?. In 2004, The A.V. Club referred to the album as "merely serviceable." PopMatters referred to the album as one of the most enjoyable records to come down the pike in quite some time."

== Track listing ==
All music is composed by Miguel Depedro except where noted.

No.	Title	Lyrics	Length
1.	"The Illness [Album Mix]"		5:19
2.	"Who Wah Kill Sound?"		6:29
3.	"Andy Warhol Is Dead But We Still Have Hope"		1:17
4.	"Ecstasy Motherfucker"		8:37
5.	"Total Recovery Is Possible"		6:00
6.	"Buckle Up"	Wayne Lonesome	5:13
7.	"If I Had a Happy Place This Would Be It"		3:19
8.	"Site Specific Sound Installation"		0:41
9.	"Powerbookfiend"		4:07
10.	"I Think I'm Alone Now"		1:02
11.	"Woofer Wrecker"		5:06
12.	"Parenthood"		4:48
Total length:			51:58

== Personnel ==
Credits adapted from Kill Sound Before Sound Kills You booklet.

- Miguel Depedro – producer
- Wayne Lonesome – vocals on "Buckle Up"
- Slanginternational.org – design, inside collage
- Joel Trussell – illustrations, inside painting, video for "The Illness"
- Xopher Anitmatter – mastering
