= Minesweeper Suite =

Studio album (DJ mix) by DJ /rupture
- Released: 2002
- Genres: Electronic music Experimental techno Turntablism; Ragga
- Label: Tigerbeat6 meow045

DJ /rupture chronology
Gold Teeth Thief (2002)	Minesweeper Suite (2002)	Special Gunpowder (2004)

Professional ratings
Review scores
Source	Rating
Allmusic	link
Stylus Magazine	B− link

Minesweeper Suite is the second mixtape by breakcore DJ and producer DJ /rupture released in 2002 on the Tigerbeat6 record label.

== Track listing ==
1. "Jibal Al Nuba/Gemini Dub" (J Boogie, MahmoudFadi) – 4:37
2. "High Resolution/Tectonic" (DJ /rupture, Heat Sensor) – 3:14
3. "Rumbo Babylon/Limb by Limb (Acappella)/Latoya: Version/Tables Will Turn" (Baby Cham, DJ /rupture, Foxy Brown, General Degree, Cutty Ranks) – 4:16
4. "Untitled A1 {From Nubus}/Ruff Enuff [Instrumenta]/Tables Will Turn [Mega Mix]" (Akrobatic, Baby Cham, Foxy Brown, So Takahashi) – 2:22
5. "Serranito/Froggy/Maffe Rhythm" (Kazamix, Rober Kimou, Nettle) – 4:03
6. "62 Ouf" (Mad Killah, Mister Faycal) – 2:28
7. "Bad Man Lighter [Jump Up Mix]/Drums Conductor/Angels: A cappella" (DJ Rush Puppy, Elastic Horizons, Wax Poetic) – 2:37
8. "In Front of You" (DJ /rupture) – 4:18
9. "Fallen Angels/Same Time: A cappella/3.37/I Remember Nothing More [DJ /rupture's needlepoint mix]" (Cul de Sac, DAT Politics, Mentol Nomad, Missing Linx) – 3:31
10. "Ballad of Jimmy Hollin [Disco Mix]/Dub Warming/Untitled B2 {From Docile #4}/I Don't Invite" (D. Wulle & A. Garcia, DJ 007, Fish & Goat at the Controls, Nettle) – 2:40
11. "Ziggurat/Plain Gold Ring" (Gregory Whitehead, Nina Simone) – 5:02
12. "Police State (Acappella)/Babomb/Crossing Kingston Bridge/Tanzila/Untitled b1 from "Nubus"" (Dead Prez, DJ Mutamassik, Joshua Abrams, Music of The Pearl Divers, So Takahashi) – 3:27
13. "Igbal Jobi and Party" (Sorath) – 3:05
14. "Ruled By The Mob/Apna Sangheet Sings Apna Sangheet (Speedy Gonzalez Mix)" (Bodysnatcher, Sardara Gill) – 3:02
15. "Up from the Underground (Instrumental)" (The Temple Of Hiphop Culture) – 1:08
16. "Enemy/Up from the Underground" (Rotator, The Temple of Hiphop Culture) – 2:46
17. "Discipline of D.E./Trasn 'n Ready" (DJ Scud, Rotator) – 2:27
18. "From Alright Reverse Vol.2,/Untitled from "L'Atlas des Galaxies Etranges"/Show 2 Show (DJ /rupture Remix) /Associations Libres" (BlackJewishGays, Borbetomagus, DJ Mutamassik, Gilles Gobeil) – 1:49
19. "Bloody Nora/Rough & Rugged" (Aphasic, Shinehead) – 1:55
20. "Masturbator/Killing Me Softly" (Eiterherd, Roberta Flack) – 2:50
21. "Are You That Somebody? (Instrumental)/Brother Hunter/Dandy/Degradmentation/Other Voices 1" (Aaliyah, Djivan Gasparyan, Kid 606, Nettle, Rik Rue) – 4:48
22. "MHh04" (The Kat Cosm) – 1:15
23. "I Am Soundboy/Big Work/We Started This (Acappella)/Everlasting Life" (Cex, Donna Summer, Eightball & M.J.G., Jingles) – 2:23
