= Warsaw Village Band =

Polish band

Warsaw Village Band (Kapela ze wsi Warszawa)
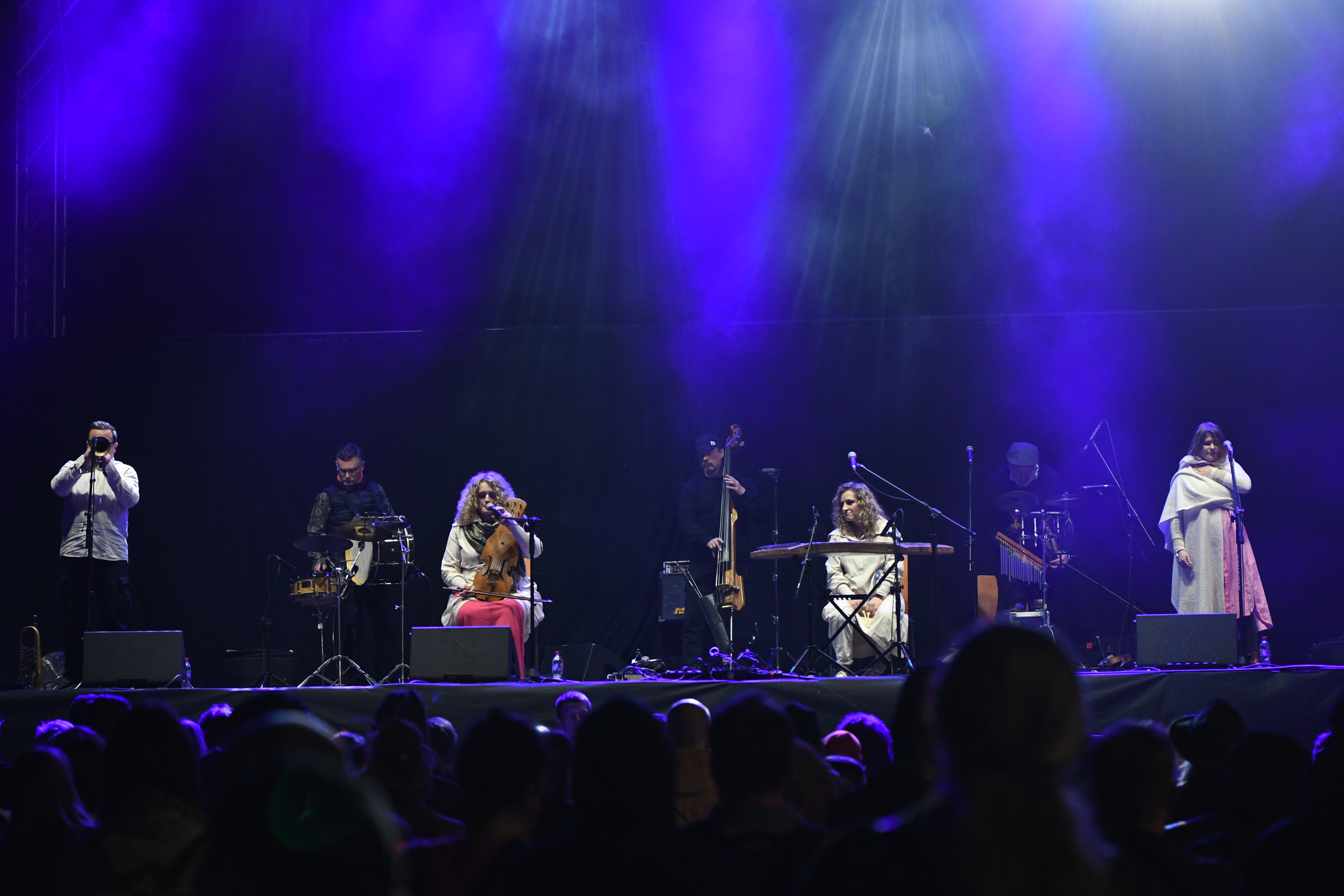
- The band at a concert in Wrocław in 2023

Background information
- Origin: Warsaw, Poland
- Genre: Polish folk music with modern elements
- Years active: 1998–present
- Label: Jaro
- Members: Magdalena Sobczak - dulcimer (hackbrett), vocals Sylwia Świątkowska - violin, suka, vocals Ewa Wałecka - violin, hurdy gurdy, vocals Piotr Gliński - big drums, percussions Paweł Mazurczak - double bass Maciej Szajkowski - frame drum, percussions Mariusz Dziurawiec - live dub mix Miłosz Gawryłkiewicz - trumpet, flugelhorn
- Past members: Maja Kleszcz; Robert Jaworski; Wojciech Krzak; Małgorzata Krej
- Website: www.warsawvillageband.net

Warsaw Village Band (Polish: Kapela ze wsi Warszawa) is a band from Warsaw, Poland, that plays traditional Polish folk music tunes combined with modern elements.

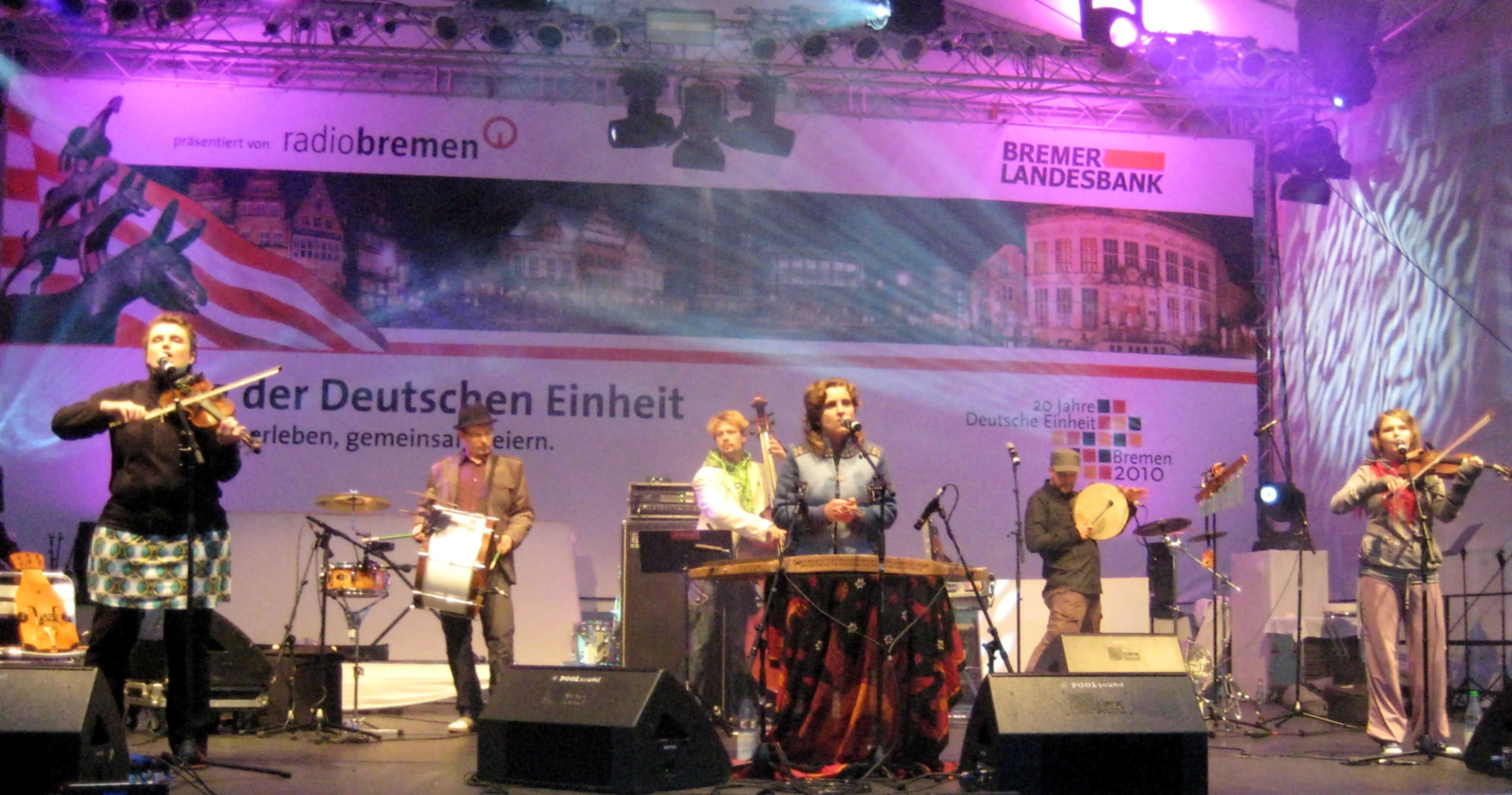
The band in 2010

== About the band ==
According to the band's manifesto, it was formed as a response to mass culture and narrow-mindedness, "which in fact leads to [the] destruction of human dignity." After the fall of the Berlin Wall and the expansion of the European Union to most of the former Warsaw Pact countries, Poland's economy has grown dramatically, as has investment by multinational corporations, raising concerns about the loss of Poland's cultural identity under globalism.

Warsaw Village Band was conceived as a response to this trend that would explore Poland's musical traditions and make them relevant to its new capitalist economy. Member Wojciech Krzak has stated that "after the nightmare of Communism, we still have to fight for our identity, and we know that beauty and identity are still in our roots." Krzak has further stated that the band are "trying to create a new cultural proposition for the youth in an alternative way to contemporary show-biz." The band's very name appears to evoke what troubles Krzak about Poland's new capitalism: many large Polish cities do not have suburbs in the traditional sense, leading to unsettling transitions directly from city to field. To this end, in Wykorzenienie (Uprooting), the band traveled throughout Poland to find and record older musicians who still played almost-forgotten styles of music, thereafter incorporating those melodies into new songs and expounding upon them.

The band also incorporate socially conscious folk lyrics in their songs. The song "Kto się żeni" ("Who is Getting Married") on their second album, Wiosna Ludu (People's Spring), discusses a young country girl who refuses to be married off, opting instead to "sing, dance, and be free rather than being dependent on someone."

Warsaw Village Band have appeared at several international music festivals, including the 2005 Roskilde Festival in Denmark, the 2004 Masala Festival in Hanover, Germany, and the 2000 International Ethnic Music Fest in Germany.

== Instrumentation ==
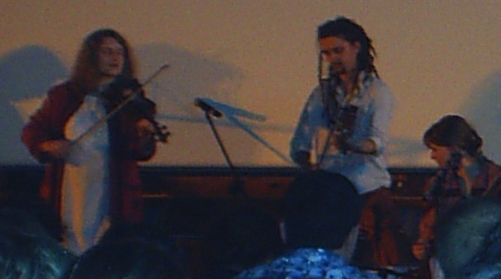
Members of the band in concert

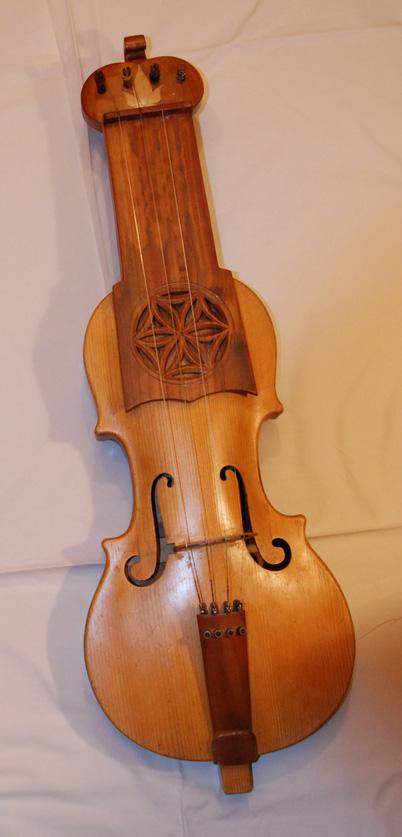
Suka, a Polish folk fiddle from the 17th century used by the band.

Notably, Warsaw Village Band have revived several musical traditions that were all but lost in Poland. The band use instruments rarely heard in modern music: frame drums, the hurdy-gurdy and the suka, a Polish folk fiddle from the 17th century stopped with the fingernails rather than the fingers, similar to the Bulgarian gadulka, the sarangi, or the rebec. The suka was practically unknown to the Polish people until member Sylwia Świątkowska began to play it in the band's concerts, and, later, on their albums. Additionally, many of the band's vocals are sung in a loud and powerful style remarkably like the "open-throated" singing styles in Bulgarian music, called biały głos (white voice). This style of singing was used by shepherds in the Polish mountains to be heard for long distances.

Warsaw Village Band have also used modern elements in their music. Wykorzenienie contains scratching by the Polish hip hop artist DJ Feel-X, most likely as a nod to the phenomenal popularity of hip hop in Poland. The same album also includes electronic siren sound effects by the band's sound engineer, Mario "Activator" Dziurex, leading to a peculiar juxtaposition of new sounds upon old melodies.

== Albums ==
- Hop Sa Sa (released in US and UK as Kapela ze wsi Warszawa) - 1998
- Wiosna Ludu (People's Spring) - 2002
- Wykorzenienie (Uprooting) - 2004
- Wymiksowanie (Upmixing) - 2008
- Infinity - 2008
- Nord - 2012
- Święto Słońca - 2015
- Re:akcja mazowiecka - 2017
- Uwodzenie - 2020
- Sploty - 2024

== Awards ==
Warsaw Village Band were nominated for the "Newcomer" award in the BBC Radio 3 World Music Awards in 2003, and won it in 2004. The band also won the Polish musical competition "New Traditions" in 1998.

2005 - "Fryderyk" - the best Polish Folk album of the year ("Uprooting").
2009 - "Fryderyk" - four nominees ("Upmixing" won the award in the best Polish folk / world music album).
2010 - "Fryderyk" - two nominees ("Infinity" won the award in the best Polish folk / world music album).
2016 - "Fryderyk" - the best Polish roots music ("Święto Słońca").
2018 - "Fryderyk" - the best Polish roots music ("Re:akcja mazowiecka").
