= Gold Teeth Thief =

- Cassette cover art

Mixtape by DJ /rupture
- Released: 2001 (Spain), rereleased in August 2002 (New Zealand)
- Recorded: 2001
- Venue: Madrid
- Genres: Jungle, experimental, breakcore, hip hop, dancehall
- Length: 1:07:08 (Total); 31:39 (Part A); 35:29 (Part B)
- Labels: Soot Records, rereleased on Violent Turd

Professional ratings
Review scores
Source	Rating
Allmusic	link

Gold Teeth Thief is a live-recorded DJ mix by DJ and producer DJ /rupture, which he self-released in 2001 as a CD-R and internet download. It was rereleased by Violent Turd, (a sublabel of Tigerbeat6) in August 2002 and named one of the "50 Records of the Year" by The Wire in 2001. The mixtape consists of forty-three tracks in sixty-eight minutes, including breakcore, ragga and Arabic folk music, as well as popular music.

== Track listing ==
=== Part A (31:39) ===
1. Missy Elliott Get Ur Freak On (Elektra),
  Nas Oochie Wally (instrumental) (Columbia),
  Ricky Dog aka Bling Dog Risen to the Top (Massive Sounds)
2. DJ Scud Badman Time (Ambush)
3. Barrington Levy Here I Come - Jungle (Greensleeves),
  Nettle Duende (Soot)
4. Dead Prez Cop Shot (Raptivism),
  Monie Muss Crew Thugz Riddim (Greensleeves),
  Spragga Benz Certain Bwoy (Greensleeves)
5. Bounty Killer Corrupt System (Greensleeves),
  Snares Man Breakbeat Malaria (History of the Future),
  Tommy Zwedberg Hanging (Fylkingen),
  Kid606 Get Yr Kicks On Route 606 (Vinyl Communications),
  Luciano Berio Visage (Turnabout),
  Venetian Snares Boarded Up Swan Entrance (Planet Mu),
  Larbi Lamtougi Salhine Assalihate (Casaphone)
6. Nettle Duende (DJ Scud's In Chains Remix) (Soot),
  Shabba Ranks Peanie Peanie (Digital B)
7. Quincy Bruce Lee MC (Ninja Tune)
8. DJ /rupture Descarriada (Broklyn Beats)

=== Part B (35:29) ===
1. Dahlena Dabka (DJ Dance Records)
2. Non Phixion Four W's Instrumental (Serchlite),
  Djivan Gasparyan Dle Yaman (Opal),
  Wu-Tang Clan Reunited (Funkstörung's Mix) (K7!),
  Nettle Untitled (white label)
3. Cannibal Ox Vein (Def Jux),
  Sub Dub Dawa Zango (theAgriculture)"
4. DJ /rupture Rumbo Babylon (Broklyn Beats)
5. Missing Links No Lodge (Primeight),
  DJ /rupture Taqsim Distorsionada (Soot)"
6. Rude Ass Tinker U Can't Touch This (Planet Mu),
  DJ /rupture feat. Mercedes Ferrer (white label),
  John Wall Track 1 (Utterpsalm),
  Moosaka w/ Splice Airbrushing (Street Forest)
7. Welmo Romero & Splice Si A Plomo Vives (DJ /rupture's Lead Poisoning Remix) (Broklyn Beats)
8. Project Pat Chickenhead (Loud),
  Nettle Duppy (Soot)
9. Ilhan Mimaroglu Agony (Turnabout),
  Nettle Ensamblaje (Soot),
  Oval Shop In Store (Thrill Jockey)
10. Muslimgauze The Taliban (Jara),
  Paul Simon w/ Ladysmith Black Mambazo Homeless (Warner Bros.)
  Miriam Makeba Djiguinira (Syliphone)
