= Resilience (Kid606 album) =

Studio album by Kid606
- Released: July 25, 2005
- Genre: Electronic pop
- Length: 57:31
- Label: Tigerbeat6
- Producer: Miguel Depedro

Kid606 chronology
Who Still Kill Sound? (2004)	Resilience (2005)	Pretty Girls Make Raves (2006)

Resilience is an album by Miguel Depedro under his alias of Kid 606. It was released by Tigerbeat6 on July 25, 2005.

== Style ==
AllMusic described Resilence as "a simple record" and unlike anything Depedro had recorded prior to its release while Exclaim! noted it was an album that was "bound to confuse long-time fans". Pitchfork described it as "not really ambient at all" but rather a stab at an electronic pop album, with chords, melodies and band-like arrangements".

== Release ==
Resilence was released by on Tigerbeat6 on compact disc and vinyl on July 25, 2005.

== Reception ==
Professional ratings
Review scores
Source	Rating
Allmusic	4/5 stars
Pitchfork Media	(6.0/10)
PopMatters	4/10 stars

At Metacritic, the album received a metascore 72 out of 100 based on six reviews, indicating "generally favorable reviews". The album received positive reviews from Mojo, Uncut and AllMusic.

PopMatters gave the album a negative review, noting that the beat rarely changes on the songs and not all of them are maintain interest, specifically "Sugarcoated" and"King of Harm".

== Track listing ==
All tracks are written by Miguel Depedro.

1. "Done With the Scene" – 5:03
2. "Spanish Song" – 5:08
3. "Phoenix Riddim" – 4:39
4. "Xmas Funk" – 5:12
5. "Sugarcoated" – 7:11
6. "I Miss You" – 4:24
7. "Banana Peel" – 4:18
8. "King of Harm" – 4:05
9. "Cascadia" – 4:14
10. "Hold It Together" – 2:32
11. "Short Road Down" – 4:28
12. "Audition" – 6:17

== Personnel ==
Credits adapted from Resilience booklet.

- Miguel Depedro – writer, performer, producer
- Multifresh – sleeve design
