= Uprooting =

Uprooting may refer to:

- in the context of agriculture, the removing of a plant (tree uprooting)
- In the context of French wine production, the destroying of less desirable vineyards: see Vine pull schemes
- in the context of human migration, a possible synonym for exile

== See also ==
- Uproot (disambiguation)
- Wykorzenienie (Uprooting in Polish)
