= Who Still Kill Sound? =

Studio album by Kid606
- Released: June 29, 2004
- Genre: IDM, glitch
- Label: Tigerbeat6 (meow102); Very Friendly (UK); Valve Records (AUS); ROMZ (JPN)
- Producer: Miguel Depedro

Kid606 chronology
Kill Sound Before Sound Kills You (2003)	Who Still Kill Sound? (2004)	Resilience (2005)

Professional ratings
Review scores
Source	Rating
AllMusic	3/5 stars
The A.V. Club	favorable
Cleveland Scene	favorable
Drowned In Sound	7/10 stars
PopMatters	favorable

Who Still Kill Sound? is a studio album by American electronic music artist Kid606. It was released in 2004 through his own Tigerbeat6 imprint. The compact disc edition of the album included an extra set of bonus tracks, and Japanese and Australian editions of the disc (released through ROMZ and Valve Records, respectively) included two extra tracks on top of the standard CD track listing.

== Critical reception ==
Now wrote that Kid606 "irreverently rips through rec-room raves and pounding ragga riots, moves on to booty-bumpin' cheerleader jams and detours briefly into goofy acid house before getting busy with some boomin' Dirty South crunkness."

== Track listing ==
All tracks are written by Miguel Depedro, except where noted.

No.	Title	Writer(s)	Length
1.	"Yr Inside the Smallest Rave on Earth"		6:42
2.	"Slammin' Ragga Bootleg Track"		5:41
3.	"Phat with a PhD"		4:31
4.	"Cex Remix I Forgot to Finish"	Cex, Miguel Depedro	1:24
5.	"Live Acid Jam"		6:18
6.	"All I Wanted for Christmas Was My Braces Off"		1:20
7.	"Ladies"		2:02
8.	"Another Slammin' Ragga Bootleg Track (OK, Last One, I Promise!)"		5:37
9.	"Pregnant Cheerleader Theme Song"		4:30
10.	"Roll With It"		3:38
11.	"Rudestyleindiejunglistmassive"		4:05
12.	"I Wanna Rock (You Just Left the Smallest Rave on Earth)"		5:43
Total length:			51:31

CD bonus tracks
No.	Title	Writer(s)	Length
13.	"Dramatic Pause Of Silence To Signify The End Of The Album And Beginning Of Additional Songs Included On The CD To Make People Feel Better About Buying The CD Instead Of The Vinyl Version"		0:30
14.	"Robitussin Motherfucker (DJ Screw RIP)"		4:51
15.	"Ass Scratch Beaver"	Com.A, Miguel Depedro	4:00
16.	"Wickid Megamix"		5:49
Total length:			66:41

Japanese and Australian CD bonus tracks
No.	Title	Length
17.	"Ecstasy Motherfucker Remix" (DJ Culprit remix)	5:49
18.	"Powerbookfriend Remix" (Toecutter remix)	4:32
Total length:		77:02

== Samples used ==
- "Yr Inside the Smallest Rave On Earth" samples Boogie Nights and "Trip II The Moon (Part 2)" by Acen.
- "Slammin' Ragga Bootleg Track" samples "Bongo Bong/Je Ne T'Aime Plus" by Manu Chao, "Amen, Brother" by The Winstons, and "Life Could" by Rotary Connection.
- "Rudestyleindiejunglistmassive" samples South Park: Bigger, Longer, and Uncut
- "Cex Remix I Forgot To Finish" samples "Texas Menstrates" by Cex.
- "Ass Scratch Beaver" samples "Air Scratch Battle" by Com.A

== Credits ==
Adapted from the Who Still Kill Sound? liner notes.

- Miguel Depedro - production, music
- Sue Cie - vocals ("Ladies" and "Roll With It")
- Joel Trussel - artwork
- Christopher Davidson - mastering (credited as Antimatter)
