= The Soccergirl =

EP by kid606
- Released: April 2000
- Genre: Ambient techno
- Length: 18:37
- Label: Carpark
- Producer: Miguel Pedro

Kid606 chronology
Dubplatestyle (1999)	The Soccergirl (2000)	Down with the Scene (2000)

The Soccergirl is an EP by electronic music artist Kid606, released in April 2000 through Carpark Records. It is the second release in Carpark's "sports-FAN" series following Jake Mandell's The Placekick. Its packaging included a compact disc designed to look like a soccerball, and soccer-field surface inspired traycard.

According to Kid606, the recording was produced entirely with synthesizers in his mother's garage, and he tracked it using either a TR-909, TR-808, or a TR-606 drum machine.

== Reception ==
Professional ratings
Review scores
Source	Rating
AllMusic	3/5 stars
NME	(favorable)
Pitchfork Media	6.7/10

The NME gave the album a positive review, stating that the album gave "the sense of the new prodigy on the block stretching himself, reinventing old tricks, discovering grace can be every bit as radical as destruction. A real beauty."

== Track listing ==
All tracks are written by Miguel Pedro.

No.	Title	Length
1.	"Start"	3:15
2.	"Defective Boy"	2:32
3.	"Call Me"	0:50
4.	"If My Heart Ever Ran Away It Would be Looking for the Day When Right Beside You it Could Stay Forever"	4:31
6.	"Thank You for Being My Angel (Rev 1)"	6:10
7.	"Over"	1:19
