= Songs About Fucking Steve Albini =

Studio album by Kid606
- Released: March 23, 2010
- Genres: Ambient techno, experimental techno, drone music
- Length: 71:10
- Label: Important Records
- Producer: Miguel De Pedro

Kid606 chronology
Dance with the Chorizo (2009)	Songs About Fucking Steve Albini (2010)	Lost in the Game (2012)

Professional ratings
Review scores
Source	Rating
AllMusic	3/5 stars
The Big Takeover	favorable
Brainwashed	mixed
PopMatters	8/10 stars
Tiny Mix Tapes	3.5/5 stars

Songs About Fucking Steve Albini is the eleventh studio album by electronic music artist Kid606. It was released on compact disc by Important Records. All of the samples used on the album are from analog sources, according to the Important Records press release. The album cover and title are both a reference to Big Black's album Songs About Fucking, of which Steve Albini was lead singer and guitarist. All of the track titles are anagrams of "Miguel De Pedro", Kid606's real name.

== Track listing ==
All songs written by Miguel De Pedro.

No.	Title	Length
1.	"Dim Ego Prelude"	5:15
2.	"Odd Ripe Legume"	9:22
3.	"Mild Pureed Ego"	7:20
4.	"Purge Deem Idol"	2:14
5.	"Lou Reed Gimped"	10:16
6.	"Periled Emu God"	15:34
7.	"Deep Lid Morgue"	8:27
8.	"Eerie Gold Dump"	3:27
9.	"Die Rumpled Ego"	9:15
Total length:		71:10

== See also ==
- Songs About Fucking, Big Black album
- Steve Albini
