= Smoke (White Williams album) =

Studio album by White Williams
- Released: November 6, 2007
- Recorded: 2006–2007
- Genre: Electropop
- Length: 39:11
- Language: English
- Label: Tigerbeat6

Smoke is an album by White Williams, released on November 6, 2007 by Tigerbeat6. The album was independently recorded in multiple living spaces over two years in Cleveland, Cincinnati, New York, and San Francisco.

== Critical reception ==
Professional ratings
Aggregate scores
Source	Rating
Metacritic	70/100
Review scores
Source	Rating
AllMusic	4/5 stars
The A.V. Club	B+
Blender	3/5 stars
Cokemachineglow	62%
The Phoenix	3/5 stars
Pitchfork	(8.3/10)
PopMatters	(6/10)

Smoke was met with "generally favorable" reviews from critics. At Metacritic, which assigns a weighted average rating out of 100 to reviews from mainstream publications, this release received an average score of 70, based on 19 reviews.

== Track listing ==
No.	Title	Length
1.	"Headlines"	3:43
2.	"In the Club"	3:24
3.	"New Violence"	2:50
4.	"Going Down"	4:28
5.	"Smoke"	2:57
6.	"The Shadow"	4:56
7.	"Danger"	2:44
8.	"I Want Candy"	4:31
9.	"Fleetwood Crack"	2:24
10.	"Route to Palm"	3:45
11.	"Lice in the Rainbow"	3:29
Total length:		39:11

Release history for Smoke
Region	Date	Label	Format(s)
United States	November 6, 2007	Tigerbeat6	CD; LP; digital download
United Kingdom	April 20, 2008	Domino Recording Company	CD; LP; digital download
