= Numero =

Numero may refer to:

- Number
- Numero sign (№)
- Numéro, a French fashion magazine
- Numéro#, an electro-pop duo from Montréal
- The Numero Group, an American reissue record label
