= Snuka =

Snuka is a surname. Notable people with the surname include:

- Snuka Boy (born 1974), Japanese professional wrestler, known as Gentaro
- Jimmy Snuka, Jr. (born 1971), American professional wrestler
- Jimmy Snuka (1943–2017), Fijian professional wrestler and actor
- Tamina Snuka (born 1978), American professional wrestler and actress
- Terry Snuka (born 1964), American professional wrestler, known as Sabu

== See also ==
- Soonuka
- Suka (disambiguation)
