= Pretty Girls Make Raves =

Studio album by Kid 606
- Released: May 11, 2006
- Genres: Electronic music IDM; Acid house Techno
- Label: Tigerbeat6 meow132
- Producer: Miguel Depedro

Kid 606 chronology
| Resilience (2005) | Pretty Girls Make Raves (2006) |

Professional ratings
Review scores
| Source | Rating |
|---|---|
| Pitchfork Media | 6.9/10 |
| PopMatters | 1.5/5 stars |
| Textura | favorable |
| Tiny Mix Tapes | 3.5/5 marks |

Pretty Girls Make Raves is a studio album by American electronic music artist Kid 606. It was released on May 11, 2006, on Tigerbeat6. The album title is a parody of both a song by The Smiths and the band named after it.

== Track listing ==
1. "Let It Rock" (Miguel Depedro) – 4:52
2. "Chicken Fight" (Depedro) – 8:33
3. "Boomin'" (Depedro) – 5:49
4. "Meet Me at the Bottom" (Depedro) – 4:40
5. "Comeuppance" (Depedro) – 5:23
6. "T.Y.T.R." (Depedro) – 4:09
7. "Get Down Low" (Depedro) – 5:13
8. "Oakland Highsiding" (Depedro) – 4:41
