= Jace Clayton =

DJ /rupture
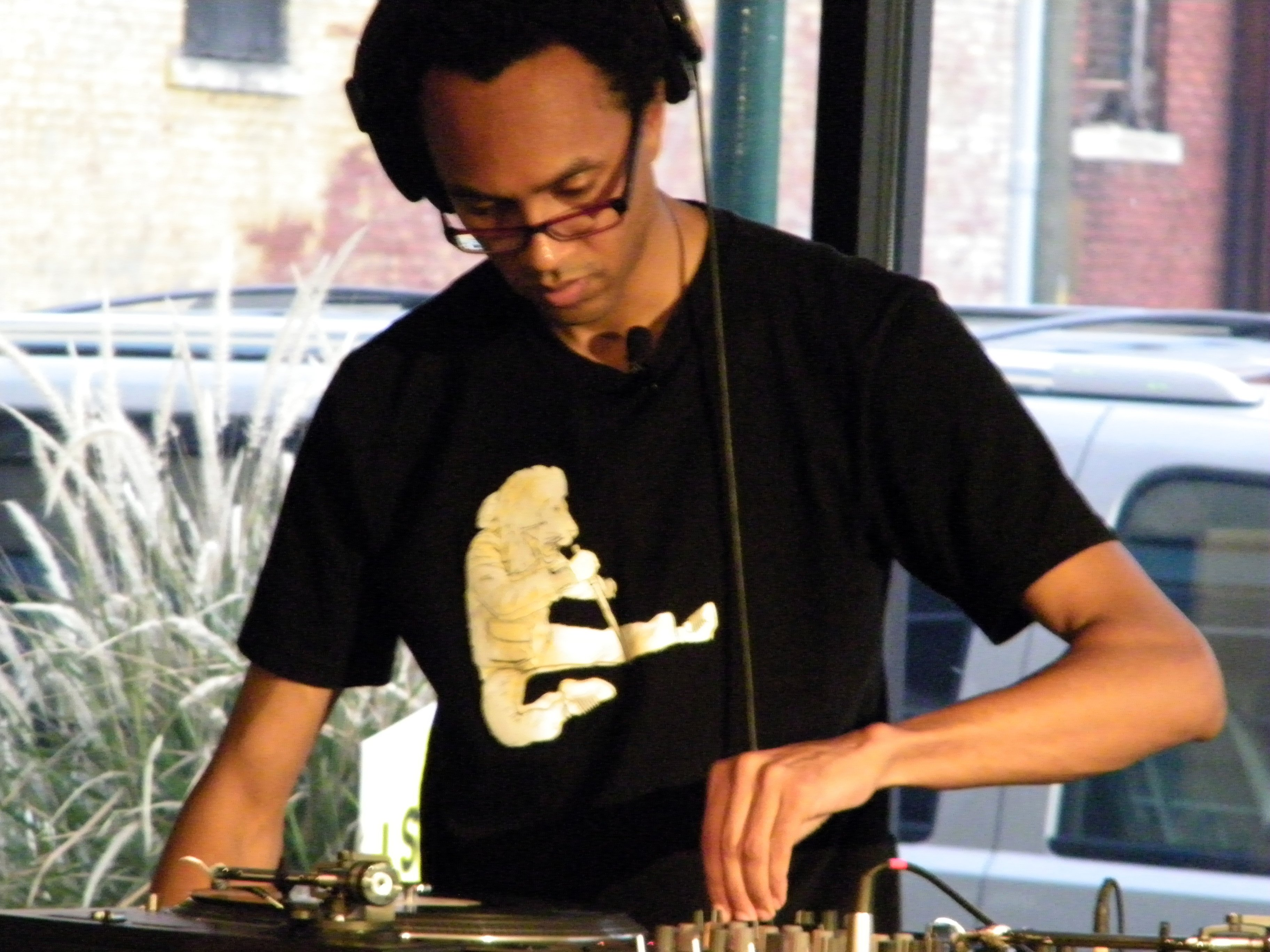
- DJ /rupture in September 2008

Background information
- Born: Jace Clayton; August 18, 1975 (age 50)
- Origin: Boston, U.S.
- Genres: Breakcore; dubstep; electronic; hip-hop; jungle; turntablism
- Occupations: DJ, writer, interdisciplinary artist
- Instrument: Turntables
- Years active: Late 1990s–present
- Labels: Tigerbeat6; New Amsterdam Records
- Website: negrophonic.com (Mudd Up!) jaceclayton.com

Jace Clayton, also known as DJ /rupture, is a New York–based American DJ, writer and interdisciplinary artist. In addition to his music, Clayton has established a blog identity with musical and non-musical posts on his website, "mudd up!". His book Uproot: Travels in 21st-Century Music and Digital Culture was published in 2016.

== Life and career ==
Clayton spent his teenage years in North Andover, Massachusetts. In the mid-1990s, Clayton was a member of Toneburst, described as "Boston's most active and visible experimental electronic art/music/DJ collective", pursuing "a steadfastly DIY aesthetic". Clayton graduated from Harvard University with a B.A. in English.

In 2001, Clayton (under the name DJ /rupture) released Gold Teeth Thief, initially as an internet download. The mixtape consists of 43 tracks in 68 minutes, including breakcore, ragga and Arabic folk music. It was named as one of the "50 Records of the Year" by The Wire in 2001. The track was released by the Violent Turd label in 2002. Reviewing Gold Teeth Thief on AllMusic, Joshua Glazer wrote: "Gold Teeth Thief is an impossibly noisy and aggressive set, yet the earthy Jamaican vocals and blunted hip-hop beats counteract the sonic devastation, making it palatable, even at its most dissident."

In 2005, Clayton was asked to write about "the 10 artists that impacted my view of electronic music" and he mentioned: Edgard Varèse, the Hanatarashi, King Tubby, Pere Ubu, Steely & Clevie, Gregory Whitehead, Timbaland, Mannie Fresh, DJ Scud and Wiley.

Between June 6, 2007, and February 27, 2013, DJ /rupture hosted a 1-hour weekly radio program "Mudd Up!" on WFMU.

In 2010, Clayton was a resident at Eyebeam, an arts research organization specialising in the interface between art and technology.

In 2012, Clayton received a Foundation for Contemporary Arts Grants to Artists Award. This grant enabled Clayton to develop Sufi Plug Ins, which he described as "a free suite of music software-as-art based on non-western conceptions of sound and alternative interfaces". In Spin, Philip Sherburne described Sufi Plug Ins as "one of the few digital tools I've seen that I would also consider art".

In 2013, Clayton received a Creative Capital award for the development of his project Gbadu and the Moirai Index, which Clayton described as "a performance piece for four vocalists and the stock market". Clayton joined the Music/Sound faculty of the MFA program at Bard College in 2013.

On March 26, 2013, New Amsterdam Records released an album by Clayton, The Julius Eastman Memory Depot. The album includes performances of works by composer Julius Eastman, "Evil Nigger" and "Gay Guerilla" by David Friend and Emily Manzo that have been manipulated and re-arranged by Clayton. The album's final track is a tribute to Eastman titled "Callback from the American Society of Eastman Supporters", which conjures up "a world where supporters of Eastman are so legion that they are turned away via robo-call". In Pitchfork, Jayson Greene described the track as "a supremely Julius-Eastman moment, a short sharp bark of wry laughter fading into dead seriousness, and it caps Clayton's searingly immediate communion with Eastman's vital, contrary spirit."

In 2016, Clayton published Uproot: Travels in 21st-Century Music and Digital Culture, described by the author as "a user manual for the world created by Mr MP3 and Ms Internet". Reviewing the book in The Guardian, Sukhdev Sandhu described it as "a travelogue of sorts", which covers the music of Monterrey, north-east Mexico, capturing "emo kids and reggaeton fans on his way to hear thundering tribal guarachero played by a DJ behind whom is projected a Harry Potter movie". Clayton looks at the music culture of the Berbers in Morocco, who make showy use of Auto-Tune and "ponders the popularity of Whitney Houston-style melisma across the Maghreb." Sandhu writes, "When Clayton talks about techniques such as transcoding and compressing – the art of squeezing recorded music into easily exportable and copyable packets of data – he could almost be talking about the journeys of refugees and migrants. Clayton, like many club goers, embraces the idea of music as a zone of mutation and adaptation, of new rhythms as thrillingly contagious, of the dancefloor as a place of both affirming and redefining community."

== Personal life ==
Clayton is married to fashion designer Rocio Salceda. They have lived in Madrid and Barcelona before settling in New York City in 2006.

== Discography ==
=== Albums ===
- Special Gunpowder (Tigerbeat6, 2004)
- Patches (with Andy Moor) (Unsuitable Records, 2008)
- The Julius Eastman Memory Depot (as Jace Clayton) (New Amsterdam Records, 2013)

=== Singles & EPs ===
- "Rummage About" (split 12-inch with Config.sys) (Soot Records, 1999)
- "$ Vol. 7-inch (split 7-inch with Kid606) (Tigerbeat6, 2001)
- "Rude Descending a Staircase" (7-inch) (Tigerbeat6, 2002)
- Split EP (split 12-inch EP with The Bug vs. The Rootsman) (Tigerbeat6, 2003)
- Special Gunpowder EP 1 (12-inch EP) (Tigerbeat6, 2004)
- Special Gunpowder EP 2 (12-inch EP) (Tigerbeat6, 2004)
- "No Heathen" (split 12-inch with Com.a and Wicked Act) (Shockout, 2004)
- "Dem Nuh Know Me" (split 12-inch with Team Shadetek and Wayne Lonesome) (Shockout, 2004)
- Little More Oil (12-inch EP with Kid606 and Sister Nancy) (Soul Jazz Records, 2005)
- Redux (12-inch EP) (Brooklyn Beats, 2005)
- "Miss Nemesis" (7-inch) (Ek-ke, 2006)
- "Quémalo Ya" (split 12-inch with Filastine) (Shockout, 2007)
- Shallows EP (12-inch EP with Matt Shadetek) (theAgriculture, 2009)

=== DJ mixes ===
- 1 + 1 = 3 (cassette) (self-released, 1999)
- Gold Teeth Thief (self-released/Tigerbeat6, 2001)
- Minesweeper Suite (Tigerbeat6, 2002)
- 58.46 Radio Mix (self-released, 2003)
- Post Election Mix (radio broadcast on Resonance FM, 2004)
- Shotgun Wedding Vol. 1: The Bidoun Sessions (with Mutamassik) (Tigerbeat6, 2004)
- Low Income Tomorrowland (Applecore Records, 2005)
- Soot Fall Tour 06 (with Filastine) (self-released, 2006)
- Improvisation for Guitar + Turntables (with Andy Moor) (Soot Records, 2006)
- Shotgun Wedding Vol. 6 (with Filastine) (Tigerbeat6, 2007)
- Live in France (with Andy Moor) (Soot Records, 2007)
- Porque Soy Sonidero Y Voy a Muchos Lugares (self-released, 2008)
- Uproot (theAgriculture, 2008)
- New York Tropical Vol. 1 (with Geko Jones) (self-released, 2009)
- K-K-Kumbia (self-released, 2009)
- Solar Life Raft (with Matt Shadetek) (theAgriculture, 2009)
- Curiosity Slowdown (self-released, 2010)
- Harlem Is Nowhere (with Sharifa Rhodes-Pitts) (self-released, 2011)
- Dreamachine / Beyond Digital (cassette with Palm Wine & Maga Bo) (Palm Wine, 2011)
- Change the Mood (self-released, 2012)
- Sunset Park Rent Strike Mix (self-released, 2012)
- 1100 vs. 2200 (with Sonido Martines) (self-released, 2013)

=== Appearances ===
- "RKK13" – Natti Tone Scat (2000)
- VA – Paws Across the World 2003 Tour (2004)
- VA – Open Up and Say...@<%_|^[!] (2004)
- The Wire Tapper 12
