= Uproot =

Uproot may refer to:

- Uproot, Vine pull schemes
- Uproot, movement in Wing Chun martial art
- Uproot (album), by DJ /rupture

== See also ==
- Uprooting (disambiguation)
