= GQ on the EQ++ =

Compilation album by Kid 606
- Released: June 19, 2001
- Recorded: 1997–1999
- Genres: IDM, glitch
- Length: 49:25
- Label: Tigerbeat6

Kid 606 chronology
PS You Love Me (2001)	GQ on the EQ++ (2001)	The Action Packed Mentallist Brings You the Fucking Jams (2002)

GQ on the EQ++ is a 2001 compilation album by kid606. It was released by Tigerbeat6 on June 19, 2001. The album is an expanded version of his previous extended play release GQ on the EQ that included all tracks from the album, unreleased songs from the recording sessions and other recordings from tour shows, various artist compilation albums and split singles.

== Production ==
All songs on the album were created between 1997 and 1999. The first six tracks were taken from the original 10" vinyl release of the extended play GQ on the EQ that was released by 555 of Leeds records. Tracks 7 through 12 were parts of various artists based compilation albums or releases previously available from a tour. The tracks "The Ten and the Zero" and "Staying Home from School" were unreleased tracks recording originally during the GQ on the EQ sessions.

== Style ==
Ned Raggett of Allmusic described the album as an example of de Pedro's "extreme loop/sample treatments and glitch rhythms".

== Release ==
GQ on the EQ++ was released on June 19, 2001 on compact disc through the Tigerbeat6 label.

== Reception ==
The AllMusic review by Ned Raggett awarded the album 4 stars stating "a nice overview of his work between 1997 and 1999".

Reviewing the original EP, the Chicago Reader referred to it as "more restrained and unified" than his live shows of the era, as well as that "the giddiness remains palpable."

== Track listing ==
All songs recorded and written by kid606.

1. "Dodgy" – 7:33
2. "My Kitten Went to London" – 2:41
3. "Ginza" – 2:32
4. "Dandy" – 5:06
5. "Take It from Me"– 2:51
6. "I Am Leo Hear Me Roar" – 2:25
7. "...Just Another Kool Kat" – 5:46
8. "Nobody Wants to Be a Star Anymore (Toss It)" – 3:47
9. "When I Want a Gun, Yeah" – 4:40
10. "Start Over" – 1:18
11. "Attn: Vat!" – 2:07
12. "Relive Yr Unhappy Childhood" – 1:25
13. "The Ten and the Zero" – 5:56
14. "Staying Home from School" – 3:21

== Personnel ==
- Kid606 – composer, recording

== See also ==
- 2001 in music
