= Catstep =

Catstep or cat step may refer to:

- Terracette, a type of landform, colloquially known as catstep
- Cat step (Indonesian and Malay: langkah kucing), a stance in silat
- "Catstep/My Kitten/Catnap Vatstep DSP", a track on the Kid606 album Down with the Scene

== See also ==
- Cat § Ambulation, for how cats take steps when walking
