= Uproot (album) =

Compilation album (Mix album) by DJ /rupture
- Released: 2008
- Recorded: September 2007
- Genre: Dubstep, ragga, hip hop
- Length: 56:18
- Label: The Agriculture
- Producer: DJ /rupture

Uproot is a DJ mix album by American music producer DJ /rupture, released in 2008 by the record label The Agriculture. A related compilation album, Uproot: The Ingredients, was co-released, which features the original recordings used in the mix.

== Reception ==
Professional ratings
Aggregate scores
Source	Rating
Metacritic	83/100
Review scores
Source	Rating
AllMusic	4/5 stars
MSN Music (Consumer Guide)	A−
Pitchfork	8.8/10
PopMatters	8/10
Resident Advisor	4.5/5
URB	4/5 stars

Pitchfork placed Uproot at number 163 on its list of the top 200 albums of the 2000s.

== Track listing ==
=== Uproot ===
1. "Reef" – Baby Kites and Nokea – 2:03
2. "Elders" – Clouds – 2:44
3. "Bang Soundboy" – Istari Lasterfahrer – 2:10
4. "Cassava" – Nokea – 2:27
5. "Winter Buds" – Atki2 – 1:31
6. "Homeboys" feat. Max Normal – Maga Bo – 3:46
7. "Too Much" – Clouds – 1:49
8. "Mass Dampers" – Ekstrak – 2:45
9. "Afghanistan" – Frescoe – 1:08
10. "I Gave You All My Love" – Iron Shirt – 1:47
  (Matt Shadetek's I Gave You All My Dub remix)
11. "Capilano Bridge" – Jenny Jones – 2:41
12. "Plays John Cassavettes pt. 2" – Ekkehard Ehlers – 2:13
13. "Radios et announceurs" – Stalker – 2:48
14. "Ignadjossi" feat. Jhonel – Ghislain Poirier – 2:10
15. "Hungry Ghosts (instrumental)" – Filastine – 2:02
16. "Braille Diving" – Scuba – 1:27
17. "Mirage" – Quest
  "Brooklyn Anthem (a cappella)" – Team Shadetek – 4:51
18. "Naked" – Shackleton
  "Erhu Solo" – Brent Arnold – 2:29
19. "Strategy Decay" – Timeblind
  "3akel (a cappella)" – Maga Bo – 2:50
20. "Uranium" – Moving Ninja – 1:49
21. "Drunken Money (Ambient Remix)" – Professor Shehab + Lloop – 2:46
22. "Save from the Flames All That Yet Remains" – Dead Leaf – 3:15
23. "Second-Hand Science" – We™ – 2:35

=== Uproot: The Ingredients ===
1. "Reef" – Baby Kites – 2:31
2. "Elders" – The Clouds – 6:10
3. "Bang Soundboy" – Istari Lasterfahrer – 4:38
4. "Cassava" – Nokea – 5:29
5. "Winter Buds" – Atki2 – 4:00
6. "Homeboys" feat. Max Normal – Maga Bo – 4:07
7. "Too Much" – The Clouds – 4:41
8. "Mass Dampers" – Ekstrak – 5:27
9. "Afghanistan" – Frescoe – 5:17
10. "I Gave You All My Love (Matt Shadetek's I Gave You All My Dub remix)" – Iron Shirt – 3:19
11. "Capilano Bridge" – Jenny Jones – 3:03
12. "Plays John Cassavetes pt. 2" – Ekkehard Ehlers – 9:57
13. "Radios Et Announceurs" – Stalker – 3:04
14. "Ignadjossi" feat. Jhonel – Ghislain Poirier – 5:01
15. "Hungry Ghosts (instrumental)" – Filastine – 2:26
16. "Braille Diving" – Scuba – 5:31
17. "Mirage" – Quest – 4:33
18. "Brooklyn Anthem" feat. 77Klash and Jah Dan (a cappella) – Team Shadetek – 2:59
19. "Strategy Decay" – Timeblind – 3:48
20. "3akel" feat. Bigg (a cappella)" – Maga Bo – 3:02
21. "Drunken Monkey (Ambient Remix)" – Professor Shehab – 5:59
22. "Save From The Flames All That Yet Remains" – Dead Leaf – 5:22
23. "Second-Hand Science" – We™ – 6:04
