= Don't Sweat the Technics =

Studio album by Kid606
- Released: May 26, 1998
- Recorded: 1996–1997
- Genre: Glitch; breakcore; digital hardcore
- Length: 68:18
- Label: Vinyl Communications
- Producer: Kid606

Kid606 chronology
Don't Sweat the Technics (1998)	Down with the Scene (2000)

Professional ratings
Review scores
Source	Rating
AllMusic	2.5/5 stars
The Rolling Stone Album Guide	4.5/5 stars

Don't Sweat the Technics is the debut studio album by American electronic music artist Kid606. Recorded by Kid606 between the ages 17 to 18, the album was issued on CD format through the independent San Diego-based label Vinyl Communications in 1998. The album would later catch the attention of Mike Patton, operator of Ipecac Recordings, who subsequently signed Kid606 to Ipecac.

The album is noted for its noisy sound, mostly rooting itself in glitch and breakcore music. Influences for the album range from Atari Teenage Riot to The Locust. The album was reissued as a double CD set in 2011; the second disc comprised material released in the form of split albums.

== Track listing ==
All tracks are written by Kid606 and Tigerboy.

No.	Title	Length
1.	Untitled	2:22
2.	"Dropkick-Tomgirl's Gonna Stick with It"	2:22
3.	"I Want to Join a Gang"	2:56
4.	"She's=Defectiv"	1:44
5.	"Now I'm Completely Fucked"	5:04
6.	"Good Timing"	2:13
7.	"-Silveregg-"	2:22
8.	Untitled	1:25
9.	"Don't Sweat the Technics-Dubplatestyle"	8:35
10.	"Kid 606's Badassss Underwater Dub Track"	2:32
11.	"Damn I'm Hard"	2:39
12.	"Ghettoblaster (Two 909's and a Microphone)"	5:04
13.	"You Mean This Much < Right Now"	5:51
14.	"(Throw)"	5:56
15.	"///Tag Your It Sarah///"	3:07
16.	"Matmos Are the A-Team of Electronica"	1:55
17.	"Rescute"	2:22
18.	"Scsi-Bear-Theme Song for the Riot GRRL Attacks on the Hardcore Junglist Massive"	4:33
19.	"Lionoil:I'm Forming New Skill"	2:39
20.	"This Is How I Want It to End"	2:37
Total length:		68:18
