= Shout at the Döner =

Studio album by Kid606
- Released: 2009
- Recorded: 2009
- Genre: Electronic music
- Length: 79:02
- Label: Tigerbeat6

Kid606 chronology
Kill Soundboy Kill (2009)	Shout at the Döner (2009)	Dance With The Chorizo (2009)

Shout at the Döner is the tenth studio album by American electronic musician Kid606. The cover art of Shout At The Döner is based on the cover art of Shout at the Devil by Mötley Crüe. The record sleeve was designed by Sandra Boeckmann. The album is separated into four movements. Remixes of the songs "Be Monophobic With Me", "Samhain California", and "Baltimorrow's Parties" appear on the Be Monophobic With Me EP. Many of the songs also appear remixed on his Dance With The Chorizo.

== Track listing ==
Movement One

1. "Intro" – 1:34
2. "Be Monophobic With Me" – 6:32
3. "Mr. Wobble's Nightmare" – 6:14
4. "Samhain California" – 5:02
5. "Hello Serotonin, My Old Friend" – 5:10

Movement Two

1. "The Church Of 606 Is Now Open For Business" – 1:39
2. "Getränke Nasty" – 5:34
3. "Dancehall Of The Dead" – 6:30
4. "America's Next Top Modwheel" – 2:12
5. "Boy Die Dead" – 3:10

Movement Three

1. "You All Break My Heart" – 5:47
2. "Baltimorrow's Parties" – 4:20
3. "Cerebrate Yourself" – 0:58
4. "Monsters" – 6:12

Movement Four

1. "Malcontinental" – 3:54
2. "Great Lakes" – 5:38
3. "Underwear Everywhere" – 7:08
4. "Good Times" – 4:38
