= Omnikrom =

Canadian rap, crunk and electro group

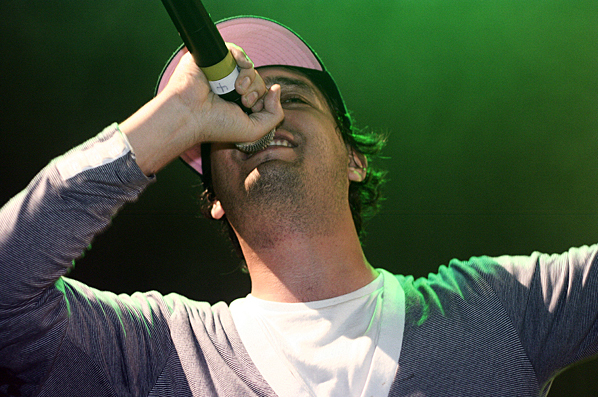
- Omnikrom performing live in Thetford Mines

Background information
- Origin: Montréal, Québec, Canada
- Genres: rap-electro
- Labels: Saboteur
- Members: Jeanbart; Linso Gabbo; Figure8

Omnikrom is a Canadian rap, crunk, and electro group formed in Montréal. Omnikrom is composed of two MCs, Jeanbart and Linso Gabbo, and their producer Figure8. They are also produced by Tepr, Kid Rolex and Ghislain Poirier.

== History ==
The group took part in collaborations with the MCs of the French group TTC on the track "Pour te réchauffer", (appearing on a street-tape by Cuizinier (member of TTC) and on Omnikrom's second EP, Future Millionnaire Vol.2) and "Danse la poutine", as well as with numéro# on the original version of "Chewing-Gum Fraise".

After having signed on to the Saboteur label, Omnikrom launched an album entitled Trop Banane! in May 2007.

At the ADISQ Gala, on the 23 October 2007, this album won the Félix in the "Hip-hop album of the year" category, and Trop banane won Hip-Hop album of the year at Le Gamiq in 2007.

In 2009, the band released the album Comme À La Télévision.

== Discography ==
=== EPs ===
- Futurs Millionnaires vol.1 (2005)
- Futurs Millionnaires vol.2 : 24 Pouces Glacés (2006)

=== Studio albums ===
- Trop Banane! (2007)
- Comme À La Télévision (2009)
