= The Action Packed Mentallist Brings You the Fucking Jams =

Studio album by Kid606
- Released: 2002
- Genres: Mashup; glitch
- Length: 62:09
- Label: Violent Turd
- Producer: Kid606

Kid606 chronology
| GQ on the EQ++ (2001) | The Action Packed Mentallist Brings You the Fucking Jams (2002) | Kill Sound Before Sound Kills You (2003) |

The Action Packed Mentallist Brings You the Fucking Jams is the fourth studio album by American electronic music artist Kid606. It was released in 2002 through Violent Turd as a compact disc and a double LP set. Kid606 composed the album by splicing together songs he had downloaded from P2P devices. Artists sampled include Missy Elliott, Jay-Z, Eminem, Yello, Ozzy Osbourne, Radiohead, The Bangles, The Buggles, The Prodigy, and Kylie Minogue.

The double LP edition omits the track "Sometimes I Thank God I Can't Sing Because Then No One Can Blame Me for Anything".

== Reception ==
Professional ratings
Review scores
| Source | Rating |
|---|---|
| AllMusic | 4/5 stars |
| Pitchfork | 7.0/10 |
| The Rolling Stone Album Guide | 4/5 stars |

Cam Lindsay of Exclaim! described The Action Packed Mentallist Brings You the Fucking Jams as "a record that is so extreme and blatantly illicit that you have to wonder how enormous this guy's nads really are". David M. Pecoraro of Pitchfork wrote that the album "offers a gimmick that just can't be beat" and praised tracks such as "MP3 Killed the Radio Star" and "Never Underestimate the Value of a Holler (Vipee-Pee Mix)", but felt that others such as "Kiddy Needs a New Pair of Laptops" and "Smack My Glitch Up" did not offer significant variations on their source material. AllMusic critic Tim DiGravina opined that it was "a fun album, though it seems rushed, perhaps because Kid606 wanted to stake his claim in the genre."

== Track listing ==
| No. | Title | Samples used | Length |
|---|---|---|---|
| 1. | "Sometimes I Thank God I Can't Sing Because Then No One Can Blame Me for Anything" | | 3:24 |
| 2. | "MP3 Killed the CD Star" | "Video Killed the Radio Star" by The Buggles; "Number One" by Ninja Man; "Purple Pills" by D12; "Numbers" by Kraftwerk; "What's My Name?" by DMX; "Shake That Ass B****" by Splack Pack | 11:25 |
| 3. | "Kiddy Needs a New Pair of Laptops" | "Back to Life (However Do You Want Me)" by Soul II Soul; "Walk Like an Egyptian" by The Bangles | 9:47 |
| 4. | "Never Underestimate the Value of a Holler (Vipee-Pee Mix)" | "Tic Toc" by Lords of the Underground; "Number One" by Ninja Man; "Take On Me" by A-ha; "Get Ur Freak On" by Missy Elliott; "Sweet Leaf" by Black Sabbath; "Oh Yeah" by Oh Yeah (Yello song) | 14:19 |
| 5. | "Rebel Girl" | "Rebel Girl by Bikini Kill | 3:41 |
| 6. | "Smack My Glitch Up" | "Can't Get You Out of My Head by Kylie Minogue | 6:30 |
| 7. | "This Is Not My Statement" | "Creep" by Radiohead | 13:03 |
