= Ghislain Poirier =

Canadian DJ/producer

Poirier
- Born: Ghislain Poirier; 1976 (age 49–50)
- Origin: Montreal, Quebec, Canada
- Genres: Electronic, Canadian hip-hop
- Occupations: DJ, record producer
- Years active: 2001–present
- Label: Ninja Tune
- Website: http://www.poiriersound.com/

Ghislain Poirier, often known simply as Poirier, is a Canadian DJ/producer from Montreal who is signed to the Ninja Tune record label. He has, however, also worked with other labels such as Chocolate Industries, Rebondir, Shockout, Musique Large, Intr_version and 12k. His work mainly consists of original instrumental mixes and mixes featuring Montreal hip-hop MCs including Omnikrom, Face-T and Séba. He also has collaborated with Beans, TTC, Lotek HiFi and Nik Myo. He is noted for popular remixes of tracks of rock and hip-hop artists such as Les Georges Leningrad, Clipse, Editors, Bonde do Rolê, Kid Sister, Pierre Lapointe, DJ Champion and Lady Sovereign. Though he has worked in many different genres of electronic music, he is known for his eclectic taste in music and appreciation of tropical bass sounds.

== Career ==
=== Early work ===
From 1995 until 2000, Poirier was involved in campus community radio at CISM-FM (Université de Montréal). During this time he had a radio show entitled "Branché: Monde". He began his career performing and recording under his full name with his debut album, Il N'y A Pas de Sud being released in 2001. It has been described as "an uncompromising minimal electronics record that fit part and parcel with the laptop zeitgeist". Along with Deadbeat, Tim Hecker and Mitchell Akiyama, Poirier was part of "what became known as the Montreal minimal techno movement". Sous le manguier features cover art by Poirier himself.

The middle few albums were more hip-hop in genre. Conflits and Beats As Politics were all mostly instrumental, though Conflits features two songs with Poirier doing spoken word (he also was responsible for the cover art). Other hip-hop vocalists who collaborated on these records are Québécois rappers Séba and Diverse. Poirier's fifth album, Breakupdown, was more a combination of hip-hop and techno sounds, described as "big synth sounds ripped from angrily forgotten techno, gooey basslines, and choice samples". Soon after the album's release, Porier was remixing Buck 65, Lady Sovereign, Pole, Bassnectar, Cadence Weapon, and others. He then founded Rebondir, his own imprint and released an EP.

As well, during this time, Poirier was also involved in collaborations with contemporary choreographer and dancer Dana Michel.

=== Ninja Tune ===
Poirier's first Ninja Tune full-length release was 2007's No Ground Under. Though rappers Omnikrom appear on the album, the record deviated from his previous work, focusing instead on dancehall, including vocalists Face-T and MC Zulu. In 2008, he was invited to perform at the New Yorker Festival.

In 2009 Poirier began the release of three EPs to be completed over the course of a full year, the first of which was Soca Sound System (April 2009) which included guest appearances by MC Zulu as well as soca performer Mr. Slaughter. Where Soca Sound System experimented with soca, the second Run The Riddim experimented with dancehall and the third, Low Ceiling, which came out in early 2010, focused on dance music with no vocals, "said to be inspired in part by his early years in the underground rave scene" Run The Riddim was the first release under the shortened name Poirier. All of the three EPs featured cover art by Montreal-based photographer Guillaume Simoneau.

Also in 2009, he was featured on a Truckback Records remix project for dancehall artist Erup's hit "Click My Finger" alongside Grahmzilla of Thunderheist, Nick Catchdubs and Lunice.

In January 2010, Poirier's music was used alongside Flying Lotus and Roberto Carlos Lange, among others, as the soundtrack to New York artist Brian Alfred's It’s Already the End of the World, "a solo exhibition of new work by Brooklyn artist Brian Alfred...featur[ing] 14 new paintings, collage works, and a major new video work". In March, Poirier released Running High, an album that brought together tracks from the previous three EPs as well as additional new material and remixes by "Wildlife!, Mungo, Uproot, Marflix, Maga Bo, Stereotyp, and Poirier himself".

== Bounce Le Gros and other performances ==
Poirier is well known in Montreal for a series of successful club nights entitled Bounce Le Gros (roughly translated as "Bounce Dude"). At these events Poirier experimented with "grime, crunk, hip-hop, ragga, reggae, booty house, Baltimore breaks...original urban music from all over the world". Bounce Le Gros began in 2005 at small local club Zoobizarre and then moved to larger venues as Poirier experienced increasing success. The last edition was held in the summer of 2007. During the same summer, Poirier, alongside Megasoid and DJ Khiasma held a large illegal outdoor party on St-Jean Baptiste Day, 24 June. The party was so well received that it recurred in August 2008 and again, alongside Pop Montreal on St-Jean Baptiste in 2009. As Megasoid's Speakerbruiser Rob describes: "Bridge Burner has really become an amazing event, mostly because it has received support from a good diverse group of people...with great promoters getting on deck, Pop Montreal, RedBull, Mike D, Khiasma, Ghislain and a lot of heavyweight local volunteers. [2009] was the biggest, and most visible, and most successful, but truthfully, the first one will always hold the space in my heart." In October 2009, Poirier introduced a new event called Karnival. Paul Devro (Mad Decent), Dub Boy (Ruffneck Diskotek, Bristol) and Face-T were featured. The second edition was held in February 2010 and included performances by Bonjay, Ghostbeard, Boogat and Face-T as performers and was filmed for a video for the new single "Arena" by Crookers featuring Poirier and Face-T.

== Discography ==
=== Albums ===
- 2001 Il n'y a pas de sud
- 2002 Sous le manguier
- 2003 Conflits
- 2003 Beats As Politics
- 2005 Breakupdown
- 2007 No Ground Under
- 2010 Running High
- 2016 Migration
- 2020 Soft Power
- 2024 Quiet Revolution

=== EPs ===
- 2006 Chocolate Swim
- 2006 Rebondir
- 2007 La Ronde
- 2009 Soca Sound System
- 2009 Run the Riddim
- 2010 Low Ceiling
- 2010 Las Americas

=== Singles ===
- 2004 Tribute To Tiger feat. Wayne Lonesome
- 2004 Be Strong feat. Daddy Screw
- 2004 Cold as Hell feat. Beans
- 2006 Mic Diplomat feat. DJ Collage
- 2006 Dem Nah Like Me feat. Mr Lee G
- 2007 Blazin' feat. Face-T + Running High
- 2008 No More Blood feat. Face-T
- 2008 Go Ballistic feat. MC Zulu

=== Remixes ===
- 2004 Diverse – Big Game (Poirier rmx)
- 2005 Lady Sovereign – Fiddle with the Volume (Poirier rmx)
- 2005 Les Georges Leningrad – Supa Doopa (Poirier rmx)
- 2005 Pulseprogramming – Off To Do Showery Snapshots (Poirier rmx)
- 2006 Cadence Weapon – Sharks (Poirier rmx)
- 2006 Champion – No Heaven (Poirier rmx)
- 2006 Millimetrik – Contempler l’auto-destruction (Poirier rmx)
- 2006 The Editors – Munich (Poirier rmx)
- 2007 Bassnectar – Bomb Tha Blocks feat. MC Persia (Poirier rmx)
- 2007 Buck 65 – Way Back When (Poirier rmx)
- 2007 Pierre Lapointe – Deux par deux rassemblés (Poirier rmx)
- 2007 Pole – Winkelstreben (Poirier rmx)
- 2007 TTC – Téléphone (Poirier rmx)
- 2007 Thunderheist – Bubblegum (Poirier rmx)
- 2007 We Are Wolves – Fight & Kiss (Poirier rmx)
- 2008 An-Ten-Nae – Citoyen du Monde (Poirier w/ Face-T rmx)
- 2008 Boogat – Le Jour où rien n’a changé (Poirier rmx)
- 2008 DJ C – Darling feat. Zulu (Poirier rmx)
- 2008 Yoav – Club Thing (Poirier rmx)
- 2009 Bassnectar – Art of Revolution (Poirier rmx)
- 2009 Fauna – Gauchito Gil (Poirier rmx)
- 2009 Fedaden - Verdad (Poirier rmx)
- 2010 Gotan Project – La Gloria (Poirier rmx)
- 2010 Mr. Fogg – Keep Your Teeth Sharp (Poirier rmx)
