= Motion Graphics (album) =

Studio album by Motion Graphics
- Released: August 26, 2016
- Studios: 101 Recording and 101 Mastering in Beverly Hills, California; Lindbergh Palace in Brooklyn, New York; The Magic Shop in New York City, New York
- Genres: Ambient; art pop; electronica; experimental; synth-pop; vaporwave
- Length: 29:02
- Label: Domino
- Producers: Drew Brown; Joe Williams

Singles from Motion Graphics
- 1. "Lenses" Released: July 13, 2016; 2. "Anyware" Released: August 5, 2016; 3. "Houzzfunction" Released: August 24, 2016

Motion Graphics is the self-titled debut studio album by American musician Joe Williams' project Motion Graphics. Williams initially planned it to be "a synth pop record without any nostalgia," and this plan turned into an ambient album about the feeling of being able to go to limitless places due to technology. In achieving this feel, Williams used the visual programming language Max for Live to create a virtual instrument that scrolled through 100 patches at random; when a note was input, the instrument froze at a patch. The record's overall sound palette is a combination of organic and non-organic elements; when using software instruments that replicated real-life instruments, such as clarinets and marimbas, Williams wanted to take advantage of the “quirks and glitches within them" that lead to the instruments making sounds that they could not possibly make if performed acoustically.

Motion Graphics was released by the Domino Recording Company on August 26, 2016. Three singles and music videos were released from Motion Graphics: "Lenses", "Anyware", and "Houzzfunction". Culture Sport, a digital visual artist, was responsible for creating the album artwork and videos. Motion Graphics garnered generally favorable reviews from music journalists, with common praises including the album's unique sound design.

== Concept ==
"What I like about that software is that it raises the question, 'Where is this coming from?' The origin gets blurred, because on one hand the timbre of the instrument definitely sounds like a person is playing it, but the speed of the patterning—that's where it gets tricky."

— Joes Williams on Motion Graphics' virtual instrument concept

According to Joe Williams, the final concept of Motion Graphics was realized rather than first planned out. His initial plan was "to make a synth pop record without any nostalgia" influenced by the works of Japanese technopop acts such as Yellow Magic Orchestra. In fact, Motion Graphics is similar to Yellow Magic Orchestra's music, as well as the works of Ryuichi Sakamoto or Kraftwerk, in that it is a response to modern commercial technology by "turning it into pop music" as Angus Finlayson described. It wasn't until Williams made "Anyware" while riding on an Amtrak to Grand Central Terminal that he figured out the overall concept of Motion Graphics, where he made a marimba MIDI sequence for the song that sounded like a ringtone. The more experimental songs on the album are instrumental, while cuts with vocals from Williams are more on the pop music side.

Described by Max Pearl as "both eerily familiar and totally otherworldly," Motion Graphics regards the free feeling of accessing unlimited places due to technology, which is symbolized by the record's use of virtual instruments. Finlayson called Motion Graphics a happier version of the works he co-produced with producer Matthew Papich, known by his stage name as Co La, which was also a response to modern internet culture; the album's happy mood is showcased in the Sakamoto-inspired chord structures of tracks like "Lense", "Houzzfunction" and "Mezzotint Gliss" as well as the calm tenor vocals sung by Williams.

== Styles ==
Pitchfork reviewer Phillip Sherburne categorized Motion Graphics as a vaporwave release due to its commercial topic, but Williams disagreed with this description and felt it was more of an ambient LP since he didn't use samples of corporate music or muzak on the album. In labeling the overall style of Motion Graphics, Joe Muggs of Bandcamp Daily wrote that it has hi-hat sounds similar to modern hip-hop music, a "smash-and-grab attitude to sound-sources" common in grime, the tension of most movie soundtracks, and indie rock vocals, as well as elements of the works of Timbaland.

Reviewer Chris Ingalls compared the album's combination of organic and non-human elements into the overall sound structure to the works of Icelandic artist Björk and the use of the sounds to that of the Fairlight CMI music of Peter Gabriel. Journalist Paul Simpson called it a more pop-influenced version of the works of James Ferraro and Oneohtrix Point Never, acts which have also used virtual MIDI instruments to create post-modern recordings. He also compared the album to the works of CFCF, dubstep producer Slava and R&B artist Autre Ne Veut.

Sherburne characterized the sounds on Motion Graphics as "often an avatar for something else." Examples include hi-hats that signify modern hip-hop music andclarinets and Claude Debussy-influenced MIDI riffs that remind the listener of classical music. Its combination of minimalist classical music and hip-hop elements serve as a symbol for the album's notion of going through limitless internet places. Sherburne compared “Anyware” to the album Music for 18 Musicians (1978) by Steve Reich, while he compared “Forecast” to the works of Astor Piazzolla. Elements of footwork and jazz music are also present.

== Sound design ==
Similar to the works of John Cage, algorithms were used to create sped-up MIDI arpeggios as "random data" on Motion Graphics. The rhythmic structures of each song borrow from popular music genres; "Anyware" consists of rhythms influenced by juke music, and "City Links" features elements of 1980s synthpop works. However, as journalist Colin Joyce wrote, "the movements are fast and flickering—a shuttering collision of sounds and styles that feels like it was generated from the disembodied guts of a rogue central processing unit." Motion Graphics was produced with the digital audio workstation Ableton Live. In the application, Williams programmed a plug-in in the visual programming language Max for Live that went through 100 instrument sounds at random, and when a note is played, the plug-in freezes at an instrument it is choosing at that time the note is being pushed; this leads to very different sounds being played at a rapid rate that represent the speed of garnering articles and data most news aggregators have. As Williams explained the random aspect of the record's structure:

We live comfortably with this train of thought that gets divided so finely by however you designed your twitter feed. Everything is abbreviated. You can hear it in pop-ups, or the advertisements that precede any YouTube video. It's really common, that's why I like it. It's a shared experience. But interruptions are nothing new really, I grew up with a TV pretty close by from a young age and I sort of also see it as extension of that. There's a personal connection there. It's fun to think about how attention span affects listening, and I see this area as a frontier to work out my ideas.

One way of inputting MIDI data into the Max for Live plug-in was through actual recorded audio. For example, the closing track of Motion Graphics, "SoftBank Arcade (Swiftcode Version)", plays MIDI notes that are inputted by hits from a free jazz drum recording.

Categorized by Pearl as an "uncanny pop hybrid of human and computer music," Motion Graphics has a sound that is very clear and high-quality. Driven by wild drum rhythms, all of the songs have lead melodies that are performed by hyperreal computer program replications of acoustic sounds such as clarinets, choirs, accordions, tympanis, harps and marimbas; crystal-like synthesizer sounds similar to alert messaging sounds, sound effects of birds singing and water, and Williams' downplayed vocals are also present. A sound module was also used to create guitar strumming sounds similar to error message sound effects. In using hyper-real computer programs that try to reproduce real-life instruments, he noticed "quirks and glitches within them," such as samples that go out of the range an actual instrument can handle, and Williams took advantage of those quirks in order to make the instrument sounds more unique to listen to. In "Airdrop", vox, saxophone and kantele sounds are played together and sped-up to create a pitch wheel'd sound similar to dolphin noises.

== Vocals and lyrics ==
In regards to vocals, Williams explained, "I'll start a track and it will get to a point where there's a heavy implication that some kind of vocal would complete the track." Journalist Aurora Mitchell wrote that Motion Graphics was unique from most synthpop records in that it had calm singing that actually complimented otherwise very loud sounds. As Sherburne described the lyrical content Williams sings on Motion Graphics, they "weave sticky semantic webs that join the natural world with its digital analog." The lyrics are about how someone provides new electric wiring in order to connect together real-life objects and visioning such as leaves, windows and bird vision screens. On "Minecraft Mosaic", he sings "Heaven sent the GUI", while on "City Links", he sings "Links accelerate/Rendering a time zone/Moving in a mobile home." As Sherburne analyzed, "it seems likely those arenn't double-wides he’s talking about, but rather our own peripatetic second homes, as we scuttle about like hyperconnected hermit crabs living out of our phones."

== Singles and music videos ==
On July 13, 2016, it was announced Motion Graphics was to be released on August 26, 2016 by British indie label Domino Recording Company, and the record's lead single "Lense" / "Mezzotint Gliss" (Instrumental) was issued. "Lenses" was reviewed as part of Fact magazine's "Singles Club" column where four critics, Daniel Montesinos-Donaghy, Chris Kelly, Tayyab Amin and Son Raw, reviewed the song upon its initial release. The single received an overall score of a seven out of ten. Three critics, Ingalls, Pryor Stroud and Chad Miller, reviewed the song for a similar column by PopMatters titled "Singles Going Steady", the song receiving an overall score of a 7.66 out of ten. It was also featured in Idolator's column "Silent Shout", which covers non-accessible singles that "might" be pop music. Also on July 13, the music video for "Lenses" was released, and is an animated version of Motion Graphics' cover art illustrated by Culture Sport and designed by Rob Carmichael.

On August 5, 2016 The Fader premiered "Anyware", the album's second single, and its music video, which was also by Culture Sport and involves the character from the artwork jogging in "a dancing bear DNA sequence." Like "Lenses", "Anyware" also garnered a "Singles Going Steady" review from Popmatters, but this time it garnered mixed opinions from the critics and received an overall score of a 5.22 of out ten. The third single, "Houzzfunction", was issued on August 24. Its music video by Culture Sport was released on September 1, and is a 360-degree video taking place in an "unfinished" landscape of neon-colored 3D polygon objects that surround the viewer.

== Critical reception ==
Professional ratings
Aggregate scores
Source	Rating
Metacritic	81/100
Review scores
Source	Rating
AllMusic	3.5/5 stars
Medium	6/10
Mixmag	7/10
Mojo	4/5 stars
The Music	3.5/5 stars
Pitchfork	8/10
PopMatters	8/10 stars
Renowned for Sound	4.5/5 stars
Resident Advisor	4.2/5

Motion Graphics garnered very favorable reviews from music journalists upon its release. John Lynch reviewed the album for Business Insider as one of the seven "best albums you probably missed" for the month of August 2016, highlighting its "innovative, mind-bending array of digital sounds." An AllMusic review labeled Motion Graphics as "a highly intriguing album of warped bitstream pop." The Wire called the record a "mesmerising debut", honoring its mixture of human and alien sound elements and Williams' vocal performance. A reviewer for Renowned for Sound honored it as "a surprisingly easy listen for what is, at the heart of it, a difficult album." He also spotlighted the "excellent use of layered sounds" on the album. The reviewer's only criticism was Williams' vocals, calling them a "little too flat". The Music praised Motion Graphics for properly balancing odd sound elements with "delicately layered instrumentation and semi-opaque lyricism."

In a PopMatters review, Chris Ingalls recommend listeners to hear the LP on a very loud volume for its sound design, where the album is "abrasive yet lush, with a new sonic nugget to be discovered with each listen." He also honored its "unique" atmosphere and "intense creative playfulness." Sherburne wrote that the complex composition of the album is what made it "so vividly and so lovingly" from most vaporwave records. He called it a "breath of fresh air" for the vaporwave scene mainly due to its oxymoronic vibe, which was "simultaneously placid and disorienting, warm and chintzy" and "intimate and distant", that made "it a seductively unusual listening experience as warm as the surface of your laptop." Motion Graphics landed on his year-end list for Pitchfork of the best electronic albums of the year. It also ranked number 13 on Resident Adivsor's list of the best albums of 2016 and number 86 on another year-end list by Bandcamp Daily. In a more mixed review, Ryo Miyauchi of Medium wrote, "While nothing of his self-titled album quite gives way to sticky enough songs, how Motion Graphics carefully handles his materials is still something to praise."

== Track listing ==
The following information adapted from the liner notes of Motion Graphics:

Motion Graphics – Standard version
No.	Title	Length
1.	"Lense"	3:47
2.	"Airdrop"	0:39
3.	"Houzzfunction"	3:20
4.	"Anyware"	3:50
5.	"Minecraft Mosaic"	3:13
6.	"Vistabrick"	3:02
7.	"City Links"	3:08
8.	"Forecast"	1:31
9.	"Mezzotint Gliss"	3:35
10.	"SoftBank Arcade" (Swiftcode Version)	2:57
Total length:		29:02

Motion Graphics – Digital download bonus tracks
No.	Title	Length
11.	"Mezzotint Gliss" (Instrumental)	3:12
12.	"Softbank Arcade"	2:47
Total length:		35:01

== Personnel ==
Adapted from the liner notes of Motion Graphics

- Written by Joe Williams
- Recorded and produced by Drew Brown and Williams at 101 Recording in Beverly Hills, California, Lindbergh Palace in Brooklyn, New York and The Magic Shop in New York City, New York
- Mixed and engineered by Brown with additional engineering from Williams and Kabir Hermon
- Mastered by David Ives at 101 Mastering in Beverly Hills, California
- Cover art by Culture Sport and design by Rob Carmichael at SEEN in Brooklyn, New York

== Release history ==
Region	Date	Format(s)	Label
Worldwide	August 26, 2016	CD; digital download; vinyl	Domino
