= White voice =

Eastern European singing style

Sample from a 2015 Bulgarian white voice performance

White voice (Polish: biały głos, Russian: белый голос, romanized: bielyi golos, Ukrainian: білий голос, romanized: bilyi holos) or white singing (Polish: biały śpiew, Russian: белое пение, romanized: bieloye peniye, Ukrainian: білий спів, romanized: bilyi spiv) is a contemporary name, used usually in Eastern Europe, for a traditional singing style. Alternative names for the traditional folk technique of singing are: open voice, full voice, natural voice.

== Technique ==
The technique is based on an open throat and free volume with a bright color. It spans all vocal registers. Sometimes it is close to a controlled screaming or calling. Air escapes through the fully open throat. The upper and medium resonators, laryngeal cartilage, bones and air cavities in the head and throat are used. A characteristic feature of this kind of voice is its brightness, clarity (not in the meaning of voice color) or intensity. Although breathing can be taken at random moments of a song, it is a very important underlying expression. Nowadays, a "revival" of folk singing made this style universal, equal and de facto flat. Field work shows that the style is more complex than just singing "on nose" and loud. It depends mainly on the country/region, speech, voice color, sound, solo or polyphonic singing and individual expression of a singer.

== Occasions ==
It had been practiced since ancient times among the rural population in Central and Eastern Europe. Loud and clear singing originates from practicing in the open air while working in the field. Loud singing also depends on singing with instrumental accompaniment. The singer's voice has to "strike" the music to be heard. Eastern researchers are also of the opinion that a long unison and loud, strong voice was believed to have magical powers in traditional cultures.

The white voice has been used during such rites of passage as baptism, weddings, burials and annual rituals bound to rural year, khorovodes, in large gatherings and in small spaces.

Best known contemporary bands that continue that style of singing (but are not based in villages and comprise rather typical modern city singers) are: Go_A, Drevo, and DakhaBrakha from Ukraine; The Bulgarian Voices Angelite; Svetlana Spajić from Serbia; Trys Keturiose from Lithuania that sing sutartinės; Warsaw Village Band, Południce, and Tulia from Poland; Narodnyj Prazdnik (Народний Праздник) from Russia; and Guda from Belarus.

== Geography ==
In Belarus, Bulgaria, Croatia, Latvia, Lithuania, North Macedonia, Poland, Russia, Serbia, Slovakia, the Czech Republic and Ukraine, white voice takes part mostly in polyphonic and some monophonic singing.
