= Nudge (band) =

American rock and electronic band

- Origin: Portland, Oregon
- Genres: Rock; Electronic
- Years active: 2002–present
- Members: Brian Foote; Paul Dickow

Nudge is an American band from Portland, Oregon.

Nudge was formed in Portland by Brian Foote and Paul Dickow, both formerly of Fontanelle, and Honey Owens, a member of Jackie-O Motherfucker. The band's first release was on Foote's own Outward label in 2002, followed by a full-length on Tigerbeat6 the following year. In 2005, the band released its third album, Cached, on Kranky. Following the release of Cached, the members concentrated on other projects, with Owens releasing material under the name Valet, and Dickow under the name Strategy. Foote went on to do production work for Kranky, including for the bands Atlas Sound and Lotus Plaza. Nudge regrouped in 2008 for the Infinity Padlock EP and in 2009 released a fourth full-length, its second on Kranky, entitled As Good As Gone.

== Discography ==
- Trick Doubt (Outward Music, 2002)
- Elaborate Devices for Filtering Crisis (Tigerbeat6, 2003)
- Cached (Kranky, 2005)
- Infinity Padlock EP (Audraglint, 2008)
- As Good As Gone (Kranky, 2009)
