= Numbers (American band) =

American indie rock band

Numbers are an American indie rock band from San Francisco, California.

Not to be confused with the New York pop band 'Numbers', who recorded in 1979 and 1980. Three of their songs are included on the Sandy McKnight box set How I Changed the World, released in 2010.

== History ==
The group was formed in 2000 by Indra Dunis (vocals, drums) and two former members of the band Xerobot, Dave Broekema (guitar) and Eric (Rat Tar) Landmark (keyboards). They issued their debut full-length album in 2002 on Tigerbeat6, and followed with a flurry of small-issue releases, including a split with Erase Errata. After a second album, they signed to Kill Rock Stars, who have released their last two albums. Indra Dunis is now half of the husband/wife duo, Peaking Lights.

== Discography ==
- Life (Tigerbeat6, 2002)
- Death (Tigerbeat6, 2003)
- Death Remixes, Vol. 1 EP (Tigerbeat6, 2003)
- Death Remixes, Vol. 2 EP (Tigerbeat6, 2003)
- Ee-Uh! EP (Troubleman Unlimited, 2003)
- Numbers/Erase Errata split (Tigerbeat6, 2003)
- In My Mind All the Time (Tigerbeat6, 2004)
- We're Animals (Kill Rock Stars, 2005)
- Now You Are This (Kill Rock Stars, 2007)
