= White Williams =

American music project

White Williams / Motion Graphics
- Genres: Synth-pop, electronic
- Years active: 2005–present
- Labels: Tigerbeat6, Domino Records
- Members: Joseph Williams; Hayes Shanesy; Tyler; Cale Parks; Andriu Strasser; Matthew Papich

White Williams is the music project of Cleveland/New York-based musician Joe Williams. He released one album and EP under this name before using the Motion Graphics moniker. In August 2016 the self-titled album was released through Domino Records.

== Background ==
Williams was born in Cleveland, Ohio. Williams's started playing music as a fifteen-year-old drummer for Ohio area bands Oblongata (Cleveland), Machete (Cincinnati), Mr Mad Man (Cincinnati) and USA Crypt (Cincinnati).

Williams spent the next two years recording Smoke while traveling between Cincinnati, New York City, Cleveland, and San Francisco. Exclaim! noted "the effortless way he channels the ghosts of T. Rex and Pretty in Pink cool onto a bed of disaffected electro pop that hints equally at Roxy Music and OMD."

In 2013, he soundtracked the film 12 O'Clock Boys. Williams' debut album under the Motion Graphics alias, Motion Graphics (2016), features melodies resembling instruments like marimbas and clarinets created with symphonic software mixed with crystal synths, drum patterns and understated vocals, resulting in what Max Pearl of Resident Advisor described as an "uncanny pop hybrid of human and computer music". The release was Williams' first for Domino Records. Thump described the album as a reflection of how "we use technology and communicate in a digital era."

== Members ==
- Joseph Williams - vocals, melodica, synth, laptop
- Hayes Shanesy - guitar, vocals
- Tyler - bass guitar
- Cale Parks - drums
- Andriu Strasser - art
- Matthew Papich- guitar

== Discography ==
As White Williams:

- New Violence EP (September 25, 2007)
- Smoke (November 6, 2007)

As Motion Graphics:

- Motion Graphics (2016)
