= Wykorzenienie =

Uprooting (Wykorzenienie)

Studio album by Warsaw Village Band (Kapela ze Wsi Warszawa)
- Released: September 21, 2004
- Recorded: Studio m1 – Polish Radio; 2004
- Genre: Polish folk music
- Length: 43:05
- Producer: Uli Blass

Warsaw Village Band (Kapela ze Wsi Warszawa) chronology
Wiosna Ludu (2002)	Uprooting (Wykorzenienie) (2004)	Wymiksowanie (2008)

Uprooting is the third studio album from Warsaw Village Band.

== Track listing ==
1. Roots: Józef Lipiński (Korzenie: Józef Lipiński) 0:19
2. In the Forest (W boru kalinka) 3:31
3. Woman In Hell (Baba w piekle) 2:48
4. At the Front of the Gates (A przed wroty) 3:31
5. Polka From the Sieradz Region (Polka z Sieradzkiego) 2:17
6. Matthew (Mateusz) 2:34
7. Roots:Janina Zdrzalik (Korzenie: Janina Zdrzalik) 0:35
8. Let's Play, Musicians! (Hej, zagrajcie, muzykanty) 4:14
9. The Owl (Sowa) 4:43
10. Grey Horse (Siwy koń) 3:41
11. Roots: Kapela Mariana Pełki (Korzenie: Kapela Mariana Pełki) 0:37
12. When Johnny Went to Fight in the War (A jak pojechał Jaś na wojenkę) 2:47
13. Lament (Lament) 2:32
14. I Slayed the Rye (Powałem) 4:14
15. Roots: Kazimierz Zdrzalik (Korzenie: Kazimierz Zdrzalik) 0:46
16. Fishie (Rybicka) 3:56

Production: Uli Blass

Recorded: Studio M1 – Polskie Radio 2004
