= PS I Love You (album) =

Studio album by Kid606
- Released: October 17, 2000
- Recorded: 1999–2000
- Genre: Glitch
- Length: 54:04
- Label: Mille Plateaux

Kid606 chronology
Down with the Scene (2000)	PS I Love You (2000)	PS You Love Me (2001)

PS I Love You is the third studio album by American electronic music artist Kid606. Recorded between 1999 and 2000, the album was released on October 17, 2000, on vinyl record and compact disc by Mille Plateaux.

PS I Love You has been described by critics as a step away from the breakbeat and noise styles of previous Kid606 albums and more in line with the ambient and glitch styles that Mille Plateaux was known for in the early 2000s. It was followed up with a remix album in 2001 titled PS You Love Me.

== Composition ==
Pitchfork described PS I Love You as "an entry into the ambient glitch world of Mille Plateaux." AllMusic noted that it was a "significant departure from the manic breakbeats and blatant noise barrages of Kid606's preceding Down with the Scene" and also compared it to the "clicks + cuts sound of Mille Plateaux circa 2000".

== Reception ==
Professional ratings
Review scores
Source	Rating
AllMusic	4/5 stars
Muzik	4/5
The Rolling Stone Album Guide	4.5/5 stars

Cam Lindsay of Exclaim! noted PS I Love You's shift in musical style, describing it as "almost too mellow at times to be one of [Kid606's] records", but concluded that Kid606 "deserves the utmost respect for pulling something this simple off so wonderfully". Jason Birchmeier of AllMusic described the album as "a refreshing change" from Kid606's previous works.

In a review of the remix album PS You Love Me, Pitchfork's Mark Richardson stated that with PS I Love You, "Kid proved to the world that he had processing and compositional skills to rank him amongst the heavy hitters of the genre. Either that, or he proved that glitch music was easy to make."

== Track listing ==
All tracks are written by Kid606.

No.	Title	Length
1.	"Sing It"	1:57
2.	"Where We Left Off"	5:27
3.	"Together"	4:44
4.	"Twirl"	6:07
5.	"Sometimes"	6:17
6.	"Now I Wanna Be a Cowboy"	7:08
7.	"Song Quizz Over"	7:14
8.	"Strum"	8:55
9.	"Fuck Up Everything You Can Before You Plan on Slowing Down"	6:17

== Personnel ==
Credits adapted from album liner notes.

- Kid606 – music
- Alorenz – artwork
