= PS You Love Me =

Remix album by Kid606
- Released: June 12, 2001
- Recorded: 1999–2001
- Length: 70:48
- Label: Mille Plateaux

Kid606 chronology
PS I Love You (2000)	PS You Love Me (2001)	GQ on the EQ++ (2001)

PS You Love Me is a remix album of songs by Kid 606 based primarily on material from his previous full-length album PS I Love You. Released on June 12, 2001 on compact disc and vinyl record, PS You Love Me is Kid 606's second full-length album on Mille Plateaux and contains five original tracks along with the remixes and was compiled partially from two previously released EPs.

== Reception ==
Professional ratings
Review scores
Source	Rating
Allmusic	3/5 stars
NME	(7/10)
Pitchfork Media	6.8/10

Pitchfork Media gave the album a 6.8 out of 10 rating, referring to it as "a solid collection, but ultimately suffers a bit because the remixers come from a similar aesthetic background and don't seem to be challenging themselves or the original track." The review compared the album to Microstoria's album Reprovisors noting that "you can see the opportunity lost."

== Track listing ==
1. "Act Yr Age" – 7:33
2. "Twirl: Photoshoot Rmx" – 4:43
3. "Whereweleftoff: Fortune Cookie Rmx" – 4:43
4. "Sometimes: The Kabuki-Rock-Mix" – 6:14
5. "Unleft" – 8:22
6. "PS I Love You Autobahn Remix" – 7:10
7. "Together: The Discreet Charm of Kid606 Rmx" – 4:31
8. "Whereweleftoff: Drool_String_Ukelele Rmx" – 5:36
9. "Sonqizzon" – 7:08
10. "Horseback" – 3:23
11. "PS I Dub Ya" – 6:49
12. "Goodbye" – 4:36

== Credits ==
Adapted from the PS You Love Me liner notes.

- Matmos – remix on track 2
- Atom™ – remix on track 3
- Farben – remix on track 4
- Pan•American – remix on track 5
- Rechenzentrum – remix on track 6
- Electric Company – remix on track 7
- Twerk – remix on track 8
- Posterboys Of The Apocalypse – remix on track 11
- Kid606 – everything else

== See also ==
- 2001 in music
