= Numéro (band) =

Canadian electropop duo

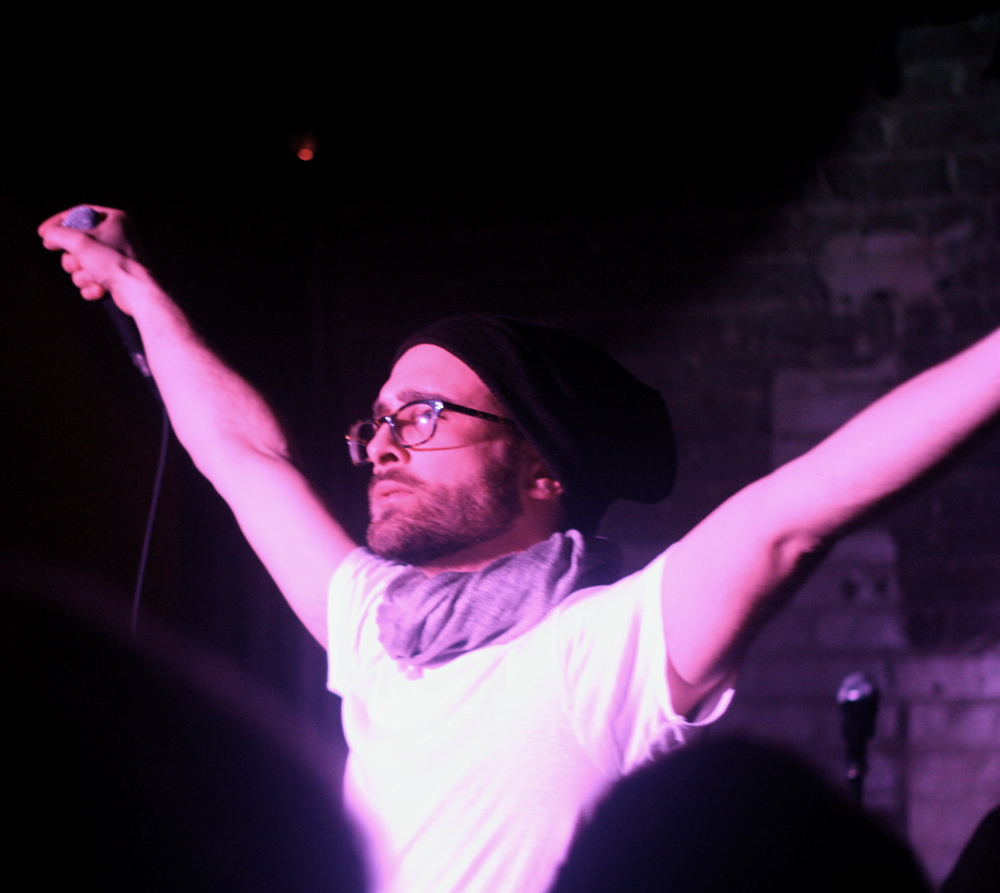
Jérôme Rocipon in Toronto, Canada

Numéro# is a French Canadian electropop duo consisting of Jérôme Rocipon and Pierre Crube.

== Background ==
Jérôme Rocipon is a native of Bordeaux, France, and played as a guitarist in various rock groups in the country with additional interests in hip hop. He started to correspond with Pierre Crube, a composer of experimental electronic music from Montreal in the primarily Francophone province of Quebec in Canada. The two exchanged their compositions on the Internet. From this exchange, the project Numéro# was born, and their compositions were put online on MySpace.

Their debut album, L'Idéologie des stars, was released in 2006 on the Montreal-based independent label Saboteur Musique. The duo performed heavily, including notably opening up for TTC. A single, "Hit pop", started to receive play on commercial top 40 radio, which is unusual for an independent group.

The band's second single, "Chewing-Gum Fraise", is their biggest hit in Canada, mostly Quebec. The song's video was the #2 video of the year on MusiquePlus.

The duo's second album, Sport De Combat, was reviewed by Romina Wendell of Exclaim!, who noted, "Keeping to the album's combative theme, Numéro's straight-up, self-aware and slightly gritty electro pop brand is lushed-up with a lot of fuzzy bass and pads."

== Collaborations ==
The rap group Omnikrom appeared on the album L'Idéologie des stars in one of the versions of their single "Chewing-gum fraise". In the spring of 2007, Numéro# returned the favour and collaborated with Omnikrom on their first album, Trop Banane!, appearing on the tracks "Ghetto Hype" and "Bouger Bouger".

== Discography ==
=== Albums ===
- L'Idéologie des stars (Saboteur Musique, 2006)
- Sport de combat (2009)

=== Singles ===
- "Hit-pop" (2007)
- "Chewing-gum fraise" (featuring Omnikrom) (2007)
- "J'aime la bourgeoisie" (2008)
- "Tout est parfait" (2009)
- "Juste pour le flirt" (featuring Teki Latex) (2010)
