= Suka =

Suka may refer to:

- Suka (film), 2023 Australian film
- Suka (string instrument)
- Sukaa, the Nepalese currency unit
- Shuka (Shukadeva), the Hindu sage
- Suka Station
- suka, a Polish profanity
- Сука, a Russian profanity
- Aferdita Suka (born 1980), German politician

== See also ==
- Sukkah, Jewish ceremonial hut
- Mangalorean Chicken Sukka, Indian chicken dish from Mangalore
