= Down with the Scene =

Studio album by Kid606
- Released: June 20, 2000
- Recorded: 1998–2000
- Genre: IDM; glitch
- Length: 53:55
- Label: Ipecac
- Producer: Kid606

Kid606 chronology
| Don't Sweat the Technics (1998) | Down with the Scene (2000) | PS I Love You (2000) |

Down with the Scene is the second studio album by American electronic music artist Kid606. It was released on compact disc on June 20, 2000, as his first full-length album for Ipecac Recordings.

== Reception ==
Professional ratings
Review scores
| Source | Rating |
|---|---|
| AllMusic | 4/5 stars |
| Muzik | 4/5 |
| NME | 8/10 |
| Q | 3/5 stars |
| The Rolling Stone Album Guide | 4/5 stars |
| Spin | 7/10 |

From contemporary reviews, John Bush of AllMusic noted that Kid606 "injects a much-needed sense of humor into the experimental/hardcore scene" which "may not be enough to warrant any more than two or three listens, but there's at least a 50–50 balance between senseless distortion and well-programmed tracks with a semblance of a groove."

In The New Rolling Stone Album Guide, critic Jon Caramanica referred to Down with the Scene as being "as ironic an electronic album as there is." Pitchfork placed the album at number 49 on its list of "The 50 Best IDM Albums of All Time", with Ned Raggett opining that Kid606 "helped upend IDM’s stereotype of bloodless astringency" and that the album was "a kaleidoscopic effort and a half. There's smooth swagger on “GQ on the EQ” and gentle sweetness with “For When Yr Just Happy to Be Alive” slamming up against frenetic compositions like “Punkshit” and “Two Fingers in the Air Anarchy Style.”"

== Track listing ==
All tracks are written by Miguel Depedro, except where noted.

| No. | Title | Writer(s) | Length |
|---|---|---|---|
| 1. | "Chart Topping Radio Hit" | | 0:18 |
| 2. | "Luke Vibert Can Kiss My Indie-Punk Whiteboy Ass" | | 2:25 |
| 3. | "Buffalo606 – The Morning After" | | 3:17 |
| 4. | "Kidrush" | | 3:51 |
| 5. | "GQ on the EQ" | | 6:04 |
| 6. | "Punkshit" | | 0:13 |
| 7. | "Secrets 4 Sale" | Depedro; Mike Patton | 3:45 |
| 8. | "Juvenile Hall Rollcall" | | 2:28 |
| 9. | "Ruin It, Ruin Them, Ruin Yrself Than Ruin Me" | | 5:25 |
| 10. | "Two Fingers in the Air Anarchy Style" | | 1:45 |
| 11. | "For When Yr Just Happy to Be Alive" | | 3:42 |
| 12. | "It'll Take Millions in Plastic Surgery to Make Me Black" | | 0:44 |
| 13. | "Dame Nature" | | 5:34 |
| 14. | "Hardcore" | | 0:23 |
| 15. | "My Kitten" | | 5:44 |
| 16. | "In Love with All You Are and Forever Maybe as If My Soul Depended on It to Survive" | | 2:17 |
| 17. | "Catstep/My Kitten/Catnap Vatstep DSP" | Depedro; Keith Fullerton Whitman | 6:00 |

== Personnel ==
- Cex – sampling
- Steve Ferrari – sampling
- George Horn – mastering
- Hrvåtski – remixing
- Seldon Hunt – cover art
- Kid606 – production
- Mike Patton – vocals on "Secrets 4 Sale"
- Kevin Martin – saxophone
- WWJD Orchestra – sounds
