= Suka (string instrument) =

Polish folk instrument

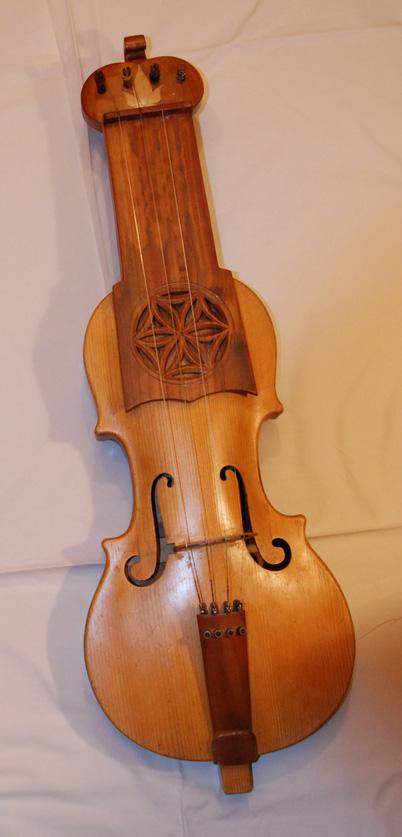
- Classification: String instrument (bowed)

Related instruments
- Violin family (viola, cello); Viol family (includes double bass)

More articles or information
- Violin family of instruments

The Suka, a traditional Polish instrument, was a fiddle that is believed to have been played vertically, on the knee or hanging from a strap, with the strings stopped at the side with the fingernails, similar to the Gadulka. The body of the instrument was very similar to the modern violin, but the neck was very wide, and the pegbox was crude. This was thought to be the "missing link" between the upside-down or "knee chordophone" instruments, and the modern violin. It died out, and was known only from drawings of a single specimen displayed at an exhibition in 1888.

In the 1990s, Polish musician Maria Pomianowska had a modernized version of the suka made: It had an extended mensur and a modified bridge to improve its acoustic qualities. Another Polish musician, Zbigniew Butryn, also made an interpretation of the suka, which he and his son Krzysztof learned to play.

Pomianowska has since taught suka classes at the Music Academy in Krakow, and numerous 21st century folk music bands have included sukas.

Marta Solek plays a suka in the Toronto, Canada bands Polky and Medusa.
