= Maga Bo =

- Birth name: Bo Anderson
- Born: Seattle, Washington, United States
- Genres: World Music, MPB, Hip hop, Funk carioca
- Occupation(s): Disc jockey, music producer, remixer, percussionist
- Years active: 1999–present
- Labels: Post World Industries, Tru Thoughts, Soot Records
- Website: www.magabo.com

Maga Bo (born Bo Anderson in Seattle, Washington) is an American Brazilian DJ, producer, sound engineer and ethnomusicologist. Though he currently resides in Rio de Janeiro, he is constantly traveling around the World to research local rhythms. He's been to over 40 countries with this purpose. His music is a fusion of many styles such as hip-hop, ragga, grime, bhangra, raï, batucada, coco, samba, dubstep, maculelê, jongo, capoeira, dub and kuduro.

== Career ==
Maga Bo moved to Rio de Janeiro in 1999. His first contact with Brazilian music was back in his hometown Seattle, through Brazilian musician and professor Jovino Santos Neto and Jeff Busch, who invited him for a batucada. At that time, Bo had no knowledge on Brazilian music, but Neto taught him a couple of things, starting his relationship with the genres from that country. He then started to make musical trips around the World - one of them saw him going from Cairo to Cape Town in a 20-country tour, hence the strong African influences in his works. The first movement which caught his attention was the Senegalese hip hop. Such trips to Africa resulted in his first full-length solo album, Archipelagoes, recorded entirely in that content and released in 2008.

His earliest releases were collaborative albums with Filastine: the first came in 2001 and consisted of Indian, Bangladeshi and Sri Lankan music works recorded between 1997 and 1999. In 2005 came Lost & Stolen Goods (2005), a live mix by the same duo, but then known as Sonar Calibrado.

His first solo work was the EP Tudo Bem, released in 2003 via Tru Thoughts. In 2007, he released another EP and a mix album, both called Confusion of Tongues, via his current Soot Records. In 2012, he released his second full-length album, Quilombo do Futuro, featuring many guest performances.

In 2014, his song "No Balanço da Canoa" was featured at the soundtrack of the next-generation version of Grand Theft Auto V, more precisely at radio WorldWide FM.

In 2022, he released his third studio album, Amor (É Revolução) (which translates as "Love (Is Revolution)").

== Discography ==
=== Solo ===
==== EPs and mix albums ====
- Tudo Bem (EP, 2003)
- Confusion of Tonges (EP, 2007)
- Confusion of Tonges (mix album, 2007)

==== Studio albums ====
- Archipelagoes (2008)
- Quilombo do Futuro (2012)
- Amor (É Revolução) (2022)

=== Collaborations ===
with AudioFile Collective

- Do Not Spit Here or There: A Noise Primer on the Indian Subcontinent (2001)

with Sonar Calibrado

- Lost & Stolen Goods (2005)
