= Kid606 =

American electronic musician

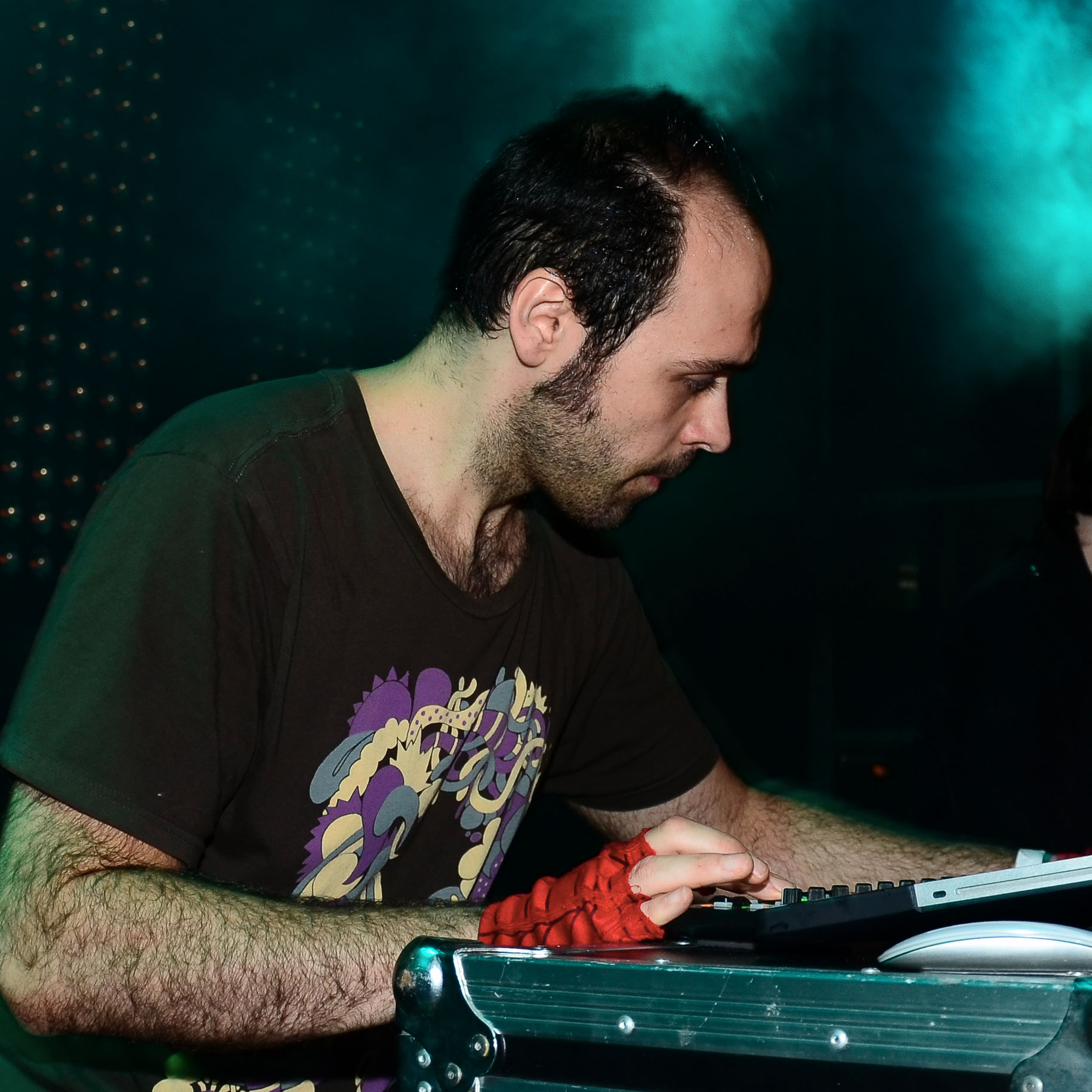
- Performing in 2011

Background information
- Also known as: The Action Packed Mentallist
- Born: Miguel Trost De Pedro; July 27, 1979 (age 46)
- Origin: Caracas, Venezuela
- Genres: Electronic; glitch; IDM; ambient techno; techno; breakcore; experimental; noise
- Occupations: DJ; producer
- Years active: 1998–2015
- Labels: Tigerbeat6; Ipecac; Mille Plateaux; Wichita Recordings

Miguel Trost De Pedro (born July 27, 1979), better known by his stage name Kid606, is an electronic musician who was raised in San Diego and later moved to San Francisco. He is most closely associated with the glitch, IDM, hardcore techno and breakcore scenes.

== Biography ==
Kid606's music is similar to the work of his friend and colleague Lesser, as well as hardcore and IDM acts such as Atari Teenage Riot, Autechre, Mr. Oizo, and Matmos. He is primarily inspired not by his electronic contemporaries, but by his love of the industrial music, death metal, and industrial metal of the 1980s and 1990s, particularly bands like Godflesh and Napalm Death. His music is known for its high tempo breakbeats and liberal use of noise and sampling, as well as its punk aesthetic, uninhibited genre-mixing, and irreverent sense of humor. However, he is equally adept at creating more serious tracks that often reside in the realm of ambient and glitch ("Parenthood" from Kill Sound Before Sound Kills You and the entirety of P.S. I Love You being good examples).

Notable releases by Kid606 include Don't Sweat the Technics (VC140: 1998), Down with the Scene (IPC-7:2000), P.S. I Love You (MP93: 2000), and Kill Sound Before Sound Kills You (IPC-46: 2003). He collaborated or participated in the groups Flossin, Spacewurm, Ariel and Disc.

In 2005, he put together a band with a drummer and guitarist called Kid606 and Friends.

== Discography ==
=== Studio albums ===
- Don't Sweat the Technics (Vinyl Communications, 1998)
- Down with the Scene (555 Recordings, 2000)
- GQ on the EQ++ (Tigerbeat6, 2000)
- PS I Love You (Mille Plateaux, 2000)
- PS You Love Me (Mille Plateaux, 2001)
- The Action Packed Mentallist Brings You the Fucking Jams (Violent Turd, 2002)
- Kill Sound Before Sound Kills You (Ipecac Recordings, 2003)
- Who Still Kill Sound? (Tigerbeat6, 2004)
- Resilience (Tigerbeat6, 2005)
- Pretty Girls Make Raves (Tigerbeat6, 2006)
- Shout at the Döner (Tigerbeat6, 2009)
- Songs About Fucking Steve Albini (Important Records, March 2010)
- Lost in the Game (Tigerbeat6, October 2012)
- Happiness (Tigerbeat6, 2013)
- Recollected Ambient Works Vol. 1: Bored of Excitement (Tigerbeat6, 2015)
- Recollected Ambient Works Vol. 2: Escape to Los Angeles (Tigerbeat6, 2015)

=== EPs ===
- Dubplatestyle (remixes) (Vinyl Communications, 1999)
- GQ on the EQ (555 Recordings, 2000)
- The Soccergirl (Carpark, 2000)
- PS I Dub Ya (Force Lab, 2001)
- Why I Love Life (Tigerbeat6, 2002)
- The Illness (Tigerbeat6, 2003)
- Die Soundboy Die (Tigerbeat6, 2008)
- Dance with the Chorizo (Tigerbeat6, 2009)
- Happier (2014)

=== Split albums/EPs ===
- Split Compact Disc (with Lesser; 1998)
- Unamerican Activity EP (with Omni Bot; 1998)
- Boy on Boy (with Pisstank; 1999)
- DISC - Kid606 Cares (with Matmos and Jay Lesser; Vinyl Communications, 1999)
- Kid606 and Friends, Vol. 1 (Tigerbeat6, 2001)

=== Remixes ===
- The Rapture - "In Love with the Underground (Kid606 Mix)"
- Peaches – "Fuck the Pain Away (Kid606 Going Back to Bali Remix)"
- Ruby – "Lilypad (Take Me to the Hospital I Am Not a Fucking Frog Remix by Kid606)"
