= Tigerbeat6 =

Record label

- Founded: 2000
- Founder: Miguel Trost De Pedro
- Distributor: Revolver USA
- Genre: Electronic, experimental, IDM, glitch/glitch hop, hip hop
- Country of origin: U.S.
- Location: San Francisco, California; Berlin

Tigerbeat6 is a San Francisco and Berlin based independent and (mostly) electronic record label run by Kid606 (Miguel De Pedro). The label is run as a DIY operation and releases a variety of electronic music styles, including noisecore, intelligent dance music, bedroom pop, folktronica, and electronica-driven hip hop. The name reflects De Pedro's obsession with cats, which also comes to light in the catalogue numbers, all of which start with MEOW. It is also a loose reference to the top-selling teen magazine Tiger Beat. The label's first release was in 2000; it has over two hundred releases in total. A 2001 compilation of the label's output was described as "stripping intelligent dance music of its intelligence[,] often resorting to outright silliness, and sometimes parody." The A.V. Club described the same compilation as satirizing glitch through "gestures borrowed from punk, indie-rock, and hip-hop."

Tigerbeat6 has four sublabels: Shockout, Tigerbass, Violent Turd, and Nibbana.

== Artists ==
- Black Dice
- Kevin Blechdom
- The Bug
- Cex
- DAT Politics
- DJ /rupture
- Drop the Lime
- Electric Company
- Genders
- Kid606
- Goodiepal
- Knifehandchop
- J Lesser
- Max Tundra
- Nudge
- Numbers
- Sickboy
- Stars as Eyes
- The Soft Pink Truth
- Pimmon
- Quintron
- White Williams
