= Mwng =

Studio album by Super Furry Animals
- Released: 15 May 2000
- Recorded: 1999 at Ofn Studios, Llanfaelog, Anglesey, Famous Studios, Cardiff and Real World Studios, Box, Wiltshire
- Genre: Alternative rock; neo-psychedelia; psychedelic folk; lo-fi
- Length: 40:30
- Label: Placid Casual; Domino (2015 re-issue)
- Producer: Gorwel Owen and Super Furry Animals

Super Furry Animals chronology
Guerrilla (1999)	Mwng (2000)	Rings Around the World (2001)

Singles from Mwng
- 1. "Ysbeidiau Heulog" Released: 1 May 2000

Mwng (pronounced [ˈmʊŋ]; English: Mane) is the fourth studio album by Welsh rock band the Super Furry Animals, and the first by the group to have lyrics written entirely in the Welsh language. Mwng was released on 15 May 2000 on the band's own record label, Placid Casual, following the demise of their former label, Creation. The album includes the single "Ysbeidiau Heulog", and reached number 11 on the UK Albums Chart following its release—the first Welsh-language album to reach the top 20. This success led to Mwng being mentioned in the House of Commons of the United Kingdom by Elfyn Llwyd, who described the record as a celebration of a "new wave of confidence in the Welsh nation".

The Super Furry Animals had attempted to make a hit record with a commercial sound with their previous release, 1999's Guerrilla. The record's singles failed to hit the top 10 of the UK Singles Chart, so the band decided to go on "pop strike". The group had written several Welsh-language songs during sessions for Guerrilla, and opted to release them as a coherent album rather than issue "token Welsh songs" as b-sides—reasoning that, if their English pop songs were not going to be played on the radio they may as well release Welsh pop songs that would not get played on the radio. Singer Gruff Rhys stated that, although the decision to release a Welsh language album was not an explicitly political statement, he does feel the record is a "stand against globalisation". Recording largely took place at Ofn Studios, Llanfaelog, Anglesey in 1999, with the band sharing production duties with Gorwel Owen. The "lo-fi" album cost just £6,000 to make, in contrast with the "excessive expense" of Guerrilla, and was recorded almost entirely live.

Mwng is an understated rock record inspired by the band's love of "Anglo-American pop culture of the 60s, 70s and 80s." The album has a "wintery persona" that is best summed up by the track "Ymaelodi Â'r Ymylon". Rhys feels that the record marks the first time the band managed to escape their influences and clearly establish their own sound. The album's lyrics deal with a diverse set of subjects, such as the death of rural communities, old school teachers, and Sarn Helen (a Roman road built in Wales). Rhys has stated that many of Mwng's songs are highly personal reflections on what were difficult years for him. Rhys has also expressed the belief that the album is accessible to non-Welsh speakers, as they can pick up on the mood of the songs even if they cannot understand the lyrics. Critical reception was generally positive, although some reviewers criticised the album for its "bare-boned production". Mwng was included in both the Melody Maker and NME "Best album of 2000" lists, with the latter calling the record the band's best release. The band were surprised by album's commercial success, entering number 11 in the UK charts, and going on to become the biggest-selling Welsh language album.

== Origins and recording ==
"As a band we speak a language that is virtually an invisible language. Welsh doesn't feature in the Webster's list of world languages, because there are fewer than a million people who speak it. Therefore it doesn't exist in the corporate world. When they build new roads through Wales, the government sells the contract to multi-national oil companies so they can open garages. The last thing on their mind is to make concessions to a local language. That's happening on a global scale to all small cultures. So, when we record a Welsh language album, it is a stand against globalisation, even if indirectly."

— Gruff Rhys, on the plight of the Welsh language

The Super Furry Animals made a conscious decision to make a commercial-sounding "pop jukebox" record with 1999's Guerrilla. The band had written the album's intended singles with the hope that they would become "radio hits", and were disappointed with the limited success they received: the first single, "Northern Lites", charted just outside the Top 10 of the UK Singles Chart at number 11, while subsequent releases "Fire in My Heart" and "Do or Die" reached numbers 25 and 20, respectively. The band blamed their record label, Creation, for the relative failure of the singles—particularly "Northern Lites", which they felt "could have been bigger" if the label had produced a better music video and conducted a more successful marketing campaign. As a result, the group became tired of playing "chart games" and went on "pop strike", deciding to release music just "for the joy of it", with no agenda.

The Super Furry Animals had written several Welsh language songs while they were working on Guerrilla and decided that, rather than releasing "token Welsh songs" as b-sides and album tracks, they would issue them together as a coherent record. These tracks would be augmented by "Dacw Hi", a song written by Rhys in 1987 that he had never "had a chance to do before", and a cover of the track "Y Teimlad", which the group wanted to record because of their admiration for Welsh language band Datblygu (who originally wrote and recorded the song in 1984). According to Rhys, the Super Furry Animals reasoned that, if their English language pop songs were not getting played on the radio, they may as well make a Welsh language album featuring songs that would not be played on the radio. Rhys has said that, although the decision to release a Welsh language album was not "an explicitly political statement", he does see Mwng as a "stand against globalisation", railing against "advanced capitalism" and the lack of interest shown in minority cultures by large companies who "just want to make money". Rhys has also stated that his boredom with writing songs in English inspired him to write Mwng, and that it is a very personal album, rather than a celebration of Welsh culture.

The "lo-fi" Mwng was recorded over two weeks in late 1999, and—in contrast with the "excessive expense" of Guerrilla—cost just £6,000 to make. The band chose Gorwel Owen as co-producer, having previously worked with him on their first two albums, 1996's Fuzzy Logic and 1997's Radiator. The majority of Mwng was recorded with Owen at Ofn Studios in Llanfaelog, Wales. According to Rhys, the band had to play in separate rooms to avoid the sound of one instrument bleeding onto the track of another during recording due to Ofn's small size. "Y Gwyneb Iau" and "Ysbeidiau Heulog" were recorded at Famous Studios in Cardiff, and were engineered by Greg Haver, while "Y Teimlad" was recorded at Real World Studios, Box, Wiltshire, and was engineered by Michael Brennan Jr. "Sarn Helen" was recorded and engineered by keyboardist Cian Ciaran in his living room. Overdubs for all songs were added at Ofn with Owen, who also mixed the album at the studio along with the Super Furry Animals. Songs were recorded almost entirely live, with the band wanting to make a "really immediate record" as a reaction against the drawn out recording sessions for Guerilla and 1997's Radiator, which had taken several months and proved frustrating for the group. The version of "Nythod Cacwn" that appears on the album is the original demo, with Rhys on drums. The band felt that, although the demo did not sound very professional, there was a warmth to it that would be impossible to recreate were the group to record the song again. The album's title translates into English as "Mane". According to Rhys, the band did not have the mane of a particular animal in mind, but felt it could be "an extension of a Super Furry Animal".

== Musical style ==
Super Furry Animals "Ymaelodi Â'r Ymylon" (2000)
"Ymaelodi Â'r Ymylon" best sums up Mwng and exemplifies its "wintery persona". This clip shows the transition from the second verse to second chorus and illustrates the track's harmony vocals.

Super Furry Animals "Y Gwyneb Iau" (2000)
"Y Gwyneb Iau" has been compared to the music of Herb Alpert, The Doors, The Velvet Underground, Nick Drake and Gladys Knight. This clip features the end of the song's intro and the beginning of the first verse, illustrating the track's "maudlin horns and military beats".

Mwng is a "lo-fi", raw, and understated record of rock songs, "stripped of the bleeps and squelches" that appear on the Super Furry Animals' other releases. Although the album's lyrics are in Welsh, singer Rhys has said that "musically there's nothing Welsh about it at all", going on to state that the record's only real Welsh influences are Datblygu (the writers of "Y Teimlad") and Meic Stevens. Instead, the record is a tribute to the band's obsession with "Anglo-American pop culture of the 60s, 70s and 80s", and is an album that "can be understood on a musical level anywhere in the Westernised world" regardless of whether or not the listener can understand the lyrics.

Bassist Guto Pryce said that he feels Mwng "sounds like an album" rather than a collection of individual songs, due to the fact it was recorded live and over a short period of time. According to Rhys, Mwng marks a refining of the group's sound, with the band having "sieved off" their influences to truly sound like the Super Furry Animals for the first time. Rhys has said that, although keyboardist Cian Ciaran did not explore "digital frontiers" on the album, he was still able to "deconstruct songs", even when playing the harmonium. The band had previously thought of the saxophone as "the instrument of Satan", but actually used one on this record for the first time, reasoning that it was appropriate as Mwng is a "darkish album". Rhys described the album as the band's "monochrome" record, stating that it is "less dressed up" than their other releases, and that it is a "good introduction to [the group's] songwriting."

Rhys said that "if there's a song that sums up the album in terms of mood", perhaps it is "Ymaelodi Â'r Ymylon", typifying its "wintery persona". The track has been described by Rhys as a celebration of the band's love of The Beach Boys, Love, and Ennio Morricone, featuring layered vocal harmonies. "Pan Ddaw'r Wawr" features a "wheezing harmonium" and "perishing trumpet swirl", and has been compared to the music of XTC, Ennio Morricone, and "psychedelic-era" Rolling Stones. According to Rhys, the music of "Sarn Helen" was written to provide the soundtrack to a fictional journey, "cruising down the A5 to Rome in a two-door chariot". The song has been called "evil personified" and dark, and has been likened to the sound of "an approaching Roman army". The "folky", eerily melancholic "Nythod Cacwn" has been compared to the Tori Amos single "Cornflake Girl". "Y Gwyneb Iau" has been described as a "brass-soaked" cross between the music of Herb Alpert and The Doors, featuring "maudlin horns and military beats", while Rhys has said that the song is a combination of Nick Drake, Gladys Knight, and The Velvet Underground's third album. "Ysbeidiau Heulog" and the album's opening track, "Drygioni", have been singled out as the only songs on Mwng that are "distinctly cheery". Both display glam rock influences and have been compared to Roxy Music, with Rhys describing "Ysbeidiau Heulog" as "old time pop music" with vocal harmonies that are a tribute to late 1960s groups such as the West Coast Pop Art Experimental Band and Os Mutantes.

== Lyrical themes ==
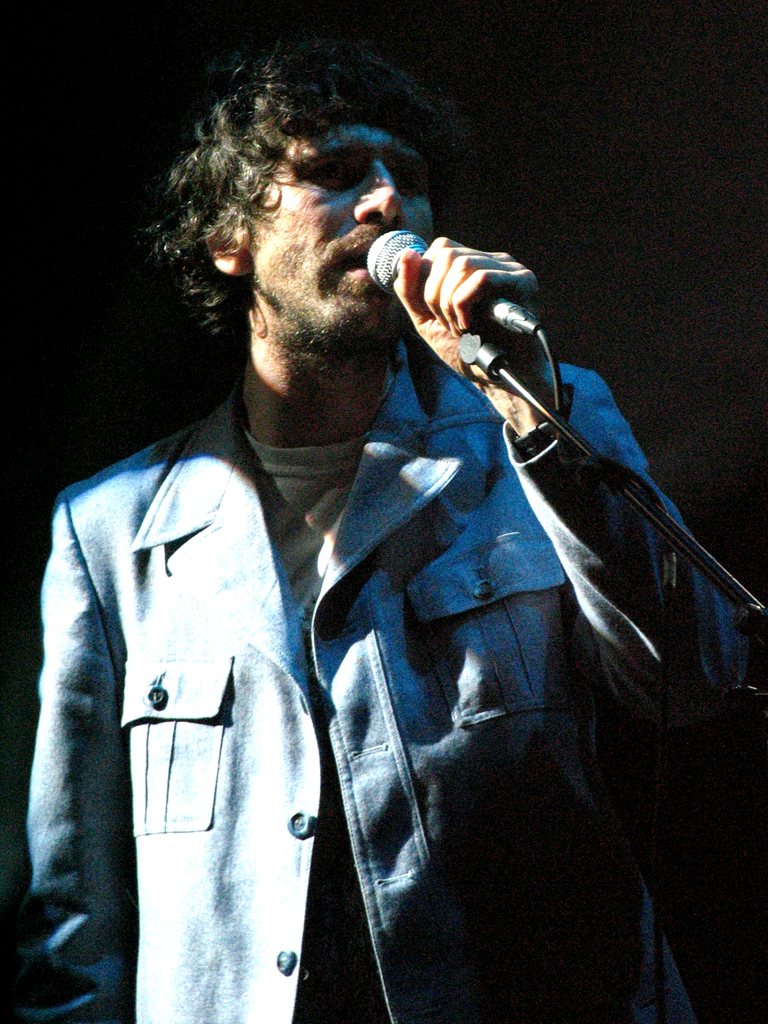
Singer Gruff Rhys has described Mwng's lyrics as some of the best he has written

Lyrically, the album deals with subjects as diverse as "isolated communities, old school teachers and Roman roads", but maintains a "warped coherency". According to Rhys, Mwng's lyrics—which he considers to be some of his best—were written "very simply" and convey simple messages. The singer made an effort to be economical with his words, not communicating a lot of information with them. Rhys feels that the album is accessible to non-Welsh speakers, citing his own experience of listening to Nirvana: "If I listen to a Nirvana record I don't understand most of their lyrics cos he's just screaming away, but I just understand the frustration and the passion in his voice. I think equally people can get off on this record by just hitting on the mood of the song, or connecting to the mood of the song."

Several of the songs on Mwng feature quite solemn, personal lyrics, which reflect on a difficult few years for Rhys. The single, "Ysbeidiau Heulog", is about "looking back at a bad time which had the odd good moment", while "Pan Ddaw'r Wawr" deals with the death of rural communities. The singer claims to have wept—rather than sung—the album's last track, "Gwreiddiau Dwfn" / "Mawrth Oer Ar y Blaned Neifion", which features lyrics "so bleak it's almost comic" about "being rooted to a sad piece of land [...] being doomed to live somewhere and that's all you have and that's what you're stuck with". Rhys has described Datblygu's "Y Teimlad" as being about "not knowing what love is or what love means." "Drygioni" is a song about "sleaze [...] about good versus evil, and a person's need for both", and "Y Gwyneb Iau" is a "moody song about war" whose title is a Welsh insult that translates into English as "Liverface". In contrast, "Nythod Cacwn" is a comedic song, based on an incident involving drummer Dafydd Ieuan being chased by bees after he disturbed a beehive while attempting to build a bonfire on a beach. It features lyrics that were "made up on the spot" by Rhys. "Dacw Hi" is inspired by one of Rhys's former teachers who claimed she had eyes in the back of her head. "Sarn Helen" is about the decline of the Roman road of the same name that was built between North and South Wales. "Ymaelodi Â'r Ymylon" is partly inspired by the ostracisation the band felt from some areas of the Welsh musical community due to their decision to sing in English on earlier albums. The track's lyrics feature the old Welsh idiom "y cythraul canu", which means "the demon in music" and refers to the friction this can create between people.

== Release and legacy ==
The Super Furry Animals had originally intended to issue Mwng in March 2000, but the release was delayed due to the demise of the band's UK record label, Creation. The group have variously stated that Creation originally planned to issue Mwng, but allowed the group to buy the rights from them for around £6,000, and that the company "didn't want to take" the record in the first place. The band decided to put the album out on their own label, Placid Casual, as they were worried that a label that did not understand the group might do something "horrific", such as putting a Welsh flag on the cover. The "Mwng" logo on the cover is based on the logo for Mixmag.

Mwng was eventually released on 15 May 2000 in the United Kingdom on CD, cassette, and vinyl, and reached number 11 in the UK Albums Chart. In the United States, Mwng was released on 20 June 2000 by Flydaddy, with a bonus CD entitled Mwng Bach (pronounced [ˈmʊŋ ˈbɑːχ]; English: Little Mane) featuring five Welsh language tracks: "Sali Mali", from the 1995 EP Moog Droog, and four songs which had originally been released in the UK as B-sides. This two-disc version of Mwng was reissued in the US in 2005 by XL Recordings/Beggars Banquet US. "Ysbeidiau Heulog" was released as the only single from the album, and failed to chart inside the UK Singles Top 75. Although the Super Furry Animals had "no commercial expectations" for the album, Mwng became the first Welsh-language record to reach the Top 20 of the UK album charts, and has frequently been called the biggest-selling Welsh language album of all time. As a result of the record's success, Mwng was mentioned in the House of Commons of the United Kingdom by Plaid Cymru's Elfyn Llwyd, who called on his fellow politicians to congratulate the band on their "chart topping new album" and recognise Mwng as a celebration of a "new wave of confidence in the Welsh nation". Rhys dismissed Llwyd's statement, saying that the record is very personal and has "bugger all to do with a celebration".

In 2015, fifteen years after its release, Domino Records re-issued Mwng. Deluxe vinyl, CD and download versions included content from the bonus Mwng Bach disc, originally included with Mwng's American release, along with live recordings and radio sessions.

Region	Date	Label	Format	Catalogue
United Kingdom	15 May 2000	Placid Casual	Compact disc	PLC03CD
United Kingdom	15 May 2000	Placid Casual	Cassette	PLC03MC
United Kingdom	15 May 2000	Placid Casual	Vinyl record	PLC03LP
United States	20 June 2000	Flydaddy	Compact disc	FLY 040–2
United Kingdom	7 May 2015	Domino	Compact disc	REWIGCD98
United Kingdom	7 May 2015	Domino	Vinyl record	REWIGLP98

== Critical reception ==
Professional ratings
Aggregate scores
Source	Rating
Metacritic	84/100
Review scores
Source	Rating
AllMusic	4.5/5 stars
Alternative Press	4/5
The Guardian	3/5 stars
Melody Maker	3.5/5 stars
NME	8/10
Pitchfork	7.9/10 (2000); 8.2/10 (2005)
Q	4/5 stars
Rolling Stone	3.5/5 stars
The Rolling Stone Album Guide	4/5 stars
Select	4/5

Mwng received generally positive reviews from critics, with a score of 84 on Metacritic denoting "universal acclaim". AllMusic called the album "terrific", and stated that the band's decision to release an all-Welsh record was courageous and proof that they are "the great eccentric band of [their] time". Drowned in Sound called the album "a poignant, dark, curling, bundle of songs", but expressed sadness that the band's usual "skewed play on words" are missed by all but Welsh speakers. In contrast, Rolling Stone said that the album's "tight arrangements of melodic bliss" manage to cross the "Welsh-language barrier." Yahoo! Music stated that Mwng cemented the Super Furry Animals' position as "figureheads of futuristic rock." The review went on to state that Mwng is "a theoretically disorientating and complex, but triumphantly audacious, experience", and said that initial reservations about not being able to understand the lyrics were lost when it became clear that Rhys was always "unintelligible [...] on record anyway".

Matt LeMay, reviewing Mwng on its initial release for Pitchfork, described the album as being not as "fully realised or inventive" as 1999's Guerrilla and said that, although the record highlights Rhys's talents for songwriting, the lack of any "electronic wizardry" from keyboard player Ciaran is disappointing. LeMay went on to state, however, that Mwng is "still [...] a damned enjoyable listen", and said that the record "couples cultural pride with unforgettable melodies in a way few bands have ever attempted". On the album's re-release in 2005, Pitchfork writer Marc Hogan stated that Mwng's "sinuous pop melodies and organic arrangements" make for an "exciting discovery", despite the lack of the band's "usual studio wizardry". Q said that, while tracks such as "Ymaelodi Â'r Ymylon" and "Y Gwyneb Iau" are "strangely charming, chiming pop music with a twist", Mwng is hampered by its "bare-boned production". Mojo, however, described the album as a "sensuous sonic journey" with an "organic, woody, mystical atmosphere" that compares favourably with the overly-produced sounds of the band's previous records. The magazine went on to suggest the album's only flaw is that it "manages to lose its way for a while [...] in the middle", thanks to the poor sequencing of its tracks.

Nude as the News stated that, although the record is "more reserved" than the band's previous releases, it "conjures up images of the Welsh winter in which the songs were recorded" and fits in with the group's "unique vision." Melody Maker described the album as a "sad, beautiful record", but expressed concern that the Super Furry Animals had moved away from the pop of Guerilla and called on them to deliver another release in the vein of the band's 1996 single "The Man Don't Give a Fuck". Nevertheless, Mwng was ranked number 24 in the magazine's "Albums of the year 2000" feature. Website SonicNet described the record as a slightly retro album that sees the Super Furry Animals "refashion the past into the present". Art Sperl, writing for Rock's Backpages in December 2000, stated that although the album "[gathers] from the past", the band's influences are channelled "into a truly organic maverick pop". NME described Mwng as an antidote to the "preservative pumped-junk" music that they felt was prevalent at the time of the album's release, and placed it at number nine in their album of the year list for 2000, calling it the group's best record. The magazine also described the album as the most accessible Super Furry Animals release, despite its Welsh-language lyrics. Rhys has stated that he considers Mwng to be a "really pure record".

Accolades

Publication	Country	Accolade	Rank	Year
Melody Maker	United Kingdom	Albums of the year 2000	24	2000
NME	United Kingdom	Albums of the year 2000	9	2000

== Track listing ==
All tracks are written by Super Furry Animals except where noted.

No.	Title	English Title	Length
1.	"Drygioni"	Badness	1:23
2.	"Ymaelodi â'r Ymylon"	Joining the Periphery	2:57
3.	"Y Gwyneb Iau"	Liverface	3:54
4.	"Dacw Hi" (written by Ffa Coffi Pawb)	There She Is	4:18
5.	"Nythod Cacwn"	Wasps' Nests	3:46
6.	"Pan Ddaw'r Wawr"	When the Dawn Breaks	4:29
7.	"Ysbeidiau Heulog"	Sunny Intervals	2:51
8.	"Y Teimlad" (cover of song by Datblygu, written by David R. Edwards)	The Feeling	4:40
9.	"Sarn Helen"	Named after the Roman road	4:18
10.	"Gwreiddiau Dwfn/Mawrth Oer ar y Blaned Neifion"	Deep Roots/Cold March on Neptune	7:55

Mwng Bach (Little Mane) American bonus CD
No.	Title	English Title	Length
1.	"Cryndod yn Dy Lais"	Trembling in Your Voice	3:13
2.	"Trons Mr Urdd"	Mr Urdd's Pants	4:37
3.	"Calimero"	Named after the Italian cartoon character	2:23
4.	"Sali Mali"	Named after the Welsh children's book and television character	4:35
5.	"(Nid) Hon Yw'r Gân Sy'n Mynd i Achub yr Iaith"	This (Isn't) the Song That's Going to Save the Language	3:49

== Personnel ==
Band

- Gruff Rhys – lead vocals, rhythm guitar, drums on "Nythod Cacwn"
- Huw Bunford – lead guitar, backing vocals
- Guto Pryce – bass guitar
- Cian Ciaran – keyboards, harmonium, backing vocals
- Dafydd Ieuan – drums, backing vocals

Additional musicians

- Gary Alesbrook – trumpet
- Matt Sibley – saxophone
- Can Pierce – claps
- Llyr Pierce – claps
- Gorwel Owen – Stylophone

Recording personnel

- Super Furry Animals – production, mixing, mastering
- Gorwel Owen – production, engineering, mixing (Ofn Studios)
- Greg Haver – engineering (Famous Studios)
- Michael Brennan Jnr. – engineering (Real World Studios)
- Stuart Hawkes – mastering (Metropolis)

Artwork

- Pete Fowler – illustration
- John Mark James – design

== Album chart position ==
Chart	Peak position
Scottish Albums (Official Charts)	16
UK Albums Chart	11
UK Independent Albums (Official Charts)	4
