= Ysbeidiau Heulog =

Single by Super Furry Animals

from the album Mwng
- Released: 1 May 2000
- Recorded: Famous Studios, Cardiff
- Genre: Alternative rock
- Length: 2:51
- Label: Placid Casual
- Songwriter: Super Furry Animals
- Producers: Gorwel Owen, Super Furry Animals; Engineered by Greg Haver

Super Furry Animals singles chronology
| "Do or Die" (2000) | "Ysbeidiau Heulog" (2000) | "Juxtapozed with U" (2001) |

"Ysbeidiau Heulog" (pronounced [əsˈbəidia(ɨ) ˈhəɨlɔɡ]; English: "Sunny Intervals") is the twelfth single by Super Furry Animals. It was the only single to be taken from the album Mwng and was released as a limited edition 7" vinyl on the band's own Placid Casual label on 1 May 2000. It was the band's first single to chart outside the UK Singles Top 75 peaking at number 89. The Welsh language song has been described by singer Gruff Rhys as "throwaway pop" and likened to the music of ELO, The West Coast Pop Art Experimental Band and Os Mutantes.

Critical reaction to the track was generally positive with some reviewers comparing the song to the work of Roxy Music. The track appears on 2004's singles compilation album Songbook: The Singles, Vol. 1 but is not included on the DVD release as no music video was made.

== Themes and recording ==
Singer Gruff Rhys has described "Ysbeidiau Heulog" as "throwaway pop ... old time pop music", likening the song to the work of ELO and going on to claim that it is a tribute to late 1960s pop bands such as The West Coast Pop Art Experimental Band and Os Mutantes. Rhys has stated that his lyrics are about "looking back at a bad time which had the odd good moment" and that "If there's any song that doesn't sum up [Mwng] it's ['Ysbeidiau Heulog']!" The track was recorded in 1999 at Famous Studios, Cardiff and was engineered by Greg Haver. Overdubs were added at Ofn studios, Llanfaelog, Wales with the help of Gorwel Owen who also mixed the song at the studio along with the Super Furry Animals. B-side "Charge" was recorded for an episode of BBC Radio 1's The John Peel Show, which aired on 1 March 2000. The track was produced for the BBC by Simon Askew and engineered by Nick Fountain.

== Musical structure ==
Super Furry Animals "Ysbeidiau Heulog" (2000)
Short sample from "Ysbeidiau Heulog" featuring the track's third chorus and outro. The clip illustrates the harmony backing vocals which accompany singer Gruff Rhys during the chorus and the lead guitar melody, and the saxophone and wah-wah guitar which play alongside it, during the outro.

"Ysbeidiau Heulog" is 2 minutes 51 seconds long and is in the key of B major. The track begins with an intro with a lead guitar melody, which plays twice, accompanied by drums, bass, distorted rhythm guitar and saxophone. The first verse begins on 14 seconds with Gruff Rhys singing the lines "Fe gawsom ni, ysbeidiau heulog, ysbeidiau heulog" with a vocoder being used on the second "ysbeidiau heulog". This entire phrase is then repeated, with Rhys accompanied by harmony backing vocals. Throughout this first part of the verse the only instrumentation is a distorted bass guitar and drums. The second half of the verse begins at 28 seconds with rhythm guitar, playing the chords B, B, A and E twice with little sustain, joining the drums and bass, which is no longer distorted. The track breaks down for the first chorus with Rhys singing "ysbeidiau heulog" four times backed by harmony vocals and occasional keyboard noises with the band rejoining on the last "heulog", the rhythm guitar playing an A chord on each of the word's two syllables which are emphasised by cymbal crashes. After a drum fill an instrumental passage begins at 53 seconds. This follows the same arrangement as the intro although the lead guitar plays a melody line just once during the second half of the section, simply feedingback for the first half. The second verse starts at 1 minute 8 seconds leading into the second chorus which this time features drums fills and rhythm guitar alongside Rhys' vocals. A short bridge plays at the end of the chorus with Rhys singing "Oedd ein cariad ni, heulog tan ddaeth glaw yn llif". Instrumentation is sparse with a guitar, featuring flanging, playing several licks alongside bass and drums, which are heavily affected by flanging. The bridge leads into the third and last chorus, which follows the arrangement of the second chorus although this time the drums feature flanging. The track ends with an instrumental outro similar to the intro. The outro begins at 2 minutes 16 seconds and features a second lead guitar with a wah-wah effect playing licks alongside the main lead guitar and saxophone. After the guitar melody has played twice the main lead guitar stops playing and the track begins to fade out.

== Release and critical response ==
"Ysbeidiau Heulog" was released as a limited edition 7" vinyl single on the Super Furry Animal's own Placid Casual label on 1 May 2000. It was the band's first single to chart outside the UK Singles Top 75 peaking at number 89. It received a generally positive response from critics. The track was awarded 'Single of the Week' in the May 10–16, 2000 issue of the Melody Maker by guest reviewers the Dum Dums who gave the song a perfect five-star rating and claimed that it is a "summery, karaoke-pop hit". Pitchfork Media called "Ysbeidiau Heulog" the best track on parent album Mwng and described it as a "decidedly retro number that combines the swingin' sounds of the '60s with some high-tech vocal effects". In a 2006 feature on the Super Furry Animals' back catalogue Incendiary Magazine called the track a "clever slice of pop". In a play on words on the track's meaning in English, Drowned in Sound stated that "Ysbeidiau Heulog" was Mwng's "sunny interval" and wouldn't feel out of place on 1999's Guerrilla. Both the NME and Rolling Stone likened the track to the work of Roxy Music with the former calling it "happily woozy" and the latter claiming it is a "spunky, sax-spiked bop". The NME also placed the track at number 33 in their single of the year list for 2000. Yahoo! Music described the track as a "playground free-for-all ... frazzled and psychedelic". Art Sperl, writing for Rock's Backpages in December 2000, was critical of the track, calling it "flimsy". The track appears on vinyl and CD copies of the band's singles compilation album Songbook: The Singles, Vol. 1 but is not included on the DVD release as no music video was made.

=== Accolades ===
| Publication | Country | Accolade | Year | Rank |
|---|---|---|---|---|
| Melody Maker | United Kingdom | Single of the week May 10–16 | 2000 | —N/a |
| NME | United Kingdom | Singles of 2000 | 2000 | 33 |

== Track listing ==
All songs by Super Furry Animals.

- 7" (PLC02)
1. "Ysbeidiau Heulog" – 2:52
2. "Charge" – 3:19

== Personnel ==
- Gruff Rhys – vocals
- Huw Bunford – guitar
- Guto Pryce – bass guitar
- Cian Ciaran – keyboards
- Dafydd Ieuan – drums
- Gary Alesbrook – trumpet
- Matt Sibley – saxophone

== Charts ==
| Chart (2000) | Peak position |
|---|---|
| United Kingdom (Official Charts Company) | 89 |
