= Specific Ocean =

Specific Ocean is a mispronunciation or mishearing of Pacific Ocean. It may also refer to:

- Specific Ocean, an area in Nick Arcade
- The Specific Ocean, a book by Kyo Maclear
- "A Specific Ocean", a song by Super Furry Animals in Guerrilla
