= Do or Die (Super Furry Animals song) =

2000 song by Super Furry Animals

Single by Super Furry Animals

from the album Guerrilla
- Released: 17 January 2000
- Recorded: Real World Studios, Box, Wiltshire
- Genre: Alternative rock
- Length: 1:59
- Label: Creation Records
- Songwriter(s): Super Furry Animals
- Producer(s): Super Furry Animals

Super Furry Animals singles chronology
"Fire in My Heart" (1999)	"Do or Die" (2000)	"Ysbeidiau Heulog" (2000)

"Do or Die" is the eleventh single by Super Furry Animals. It was the third and final single to be taken from the Guerrilla album and was the band's last release for Creation Records. The track reached number 20 in the UK Singles Chart after its release on 17 January 2000. The group had originally wanted to release "Wherever I Lay My Phone (That's My Home)" as the final single from Guerilla but Creation instead chose "Do or Die", a decision which the band claimed not to understand.

Although "Do or Die" features "daft lyrics", its name was inspired by Mahatma Gandhi's Quit India speech which called for Indians to "Do or Die" to end British Imperial rule in the country. Critical reaction was largely positive with the song being named 'Single of the Week' by the Melody Maker and appearing at number 55 in the NME's single of the year list for 2000 despite an earlier claim by the magazine that there was "no need whatsoever" to release the track as a single. The music video for "Do or Die" was directed by Jake & Jim and features live action footage of the group's heads on brightly coloured cartoon bodies.

== Themes and recording ==
According to Gruff Rhys "Do or Die" has a "ridiculously positive outlook" and was written in an attempt to "kickstart [the band] back into gear" after a bad period in the singer's life. The track is a "driving song" and features sampled car noises so that "even if you're not in a car it feels like you are". Although Rhys has called the track a "dumb pop song" with "really daft" lyrics, he has also claimed that the title was inspired by the Quit India speech made by Mahatma Gandhi on 8 August 1942 at the Gowalia Tank in Bombay in which Gandhi called for his countrymen to "Do or Die" and use non-violent resistance to end British Imperial rule in India. Rhys has stated that he feels the fact that "five-year-olds" can jump up and down to the song, singing "Gandhi lyrics", is important, as it contrasts with the "self-important ... pompous" lyrics of singers such as Jim Morrison and Robert Plant. The track was recorded in the middle of 1998 at Real World Studios, Box, Wiltshire, along with the rest of Guerrilla, and was produced by Super Furry Animals.

== Composition ==
"Do or Die" (1999)
Short sample from "Do or Die" featuring the track's instrumental passage and chorus. The clip illustrates the melody played by the lead guitar and keyboard, which also features in the track's intro, and the high harmony backing vocals which accompany chief vocalist Gruff Rhys during the chorus.

"Do or Die" is 1 minute and 59 seconds long and is in the key of A major. The instruments used on the track are tuned slightly sharper than standard. The song begins with an intro featuring a lead guitar and keyboard melody, which plays twice, accompanied by a rhythm guitar riff alternating between A and D chords, drums and bass. The track breaks down to just rhythm guitar, drums and bass for the first verse which begins after 13 seconds. The first chorus begins after 23 seconds with a distorted guitar playing the chord sequence D5, C5, B♭5 and A5 twice while Rhys sings "If we do or die we should try, if we don't try I say bye-bye, and if I say bye-bye, I'll wonder why we didn't try to do or die" backed by high harmony backing vocals and occasional keyboard noises. The song breaks down again for a second verse before the second chorus enters at 46 seconds. An instrumental passage follows with the lead guitar and keyboard reprising the melody which plays during the intro. The instrumental leads into a double chorus. At the end of the final chorus the track crescendos, with Rhys singing "yeah, yeah, yeah" and all instruments with the exception of the keyboard coming to an abrupt silence after 1 minute and 43 seconds. Keyboard noises continue and gradually fade out until the track ends.

== Release and critical reception ==
The Super Furry Animals had originally intended to issue the song "Wherever I Lay My Phone (That's My Home)" as the third single from Guerrilla but, on returning from an American tour in 1999, found that their record company, Creation, had not done any work regarding the release. Returning from a tour of Europe later the same year the band discovered that both their record label and record plugging company had folded and that Creation made the decision, first to release "Night Vision" instead of "Wherever I Lay My Phone (That's My Home)", and then to replace "Night Vision" with "Do or Die" as the last single from Guerrilla. Singer Gruff Rhys has expressed dissatisfaction with this choice, claiming that he is not sure how the decision was made and that he wanted "Wherever I Lay My Phone (That's My Home)" to be released as he "quite fancied the idea of a novelty hit". However, the group ultimately felt "Wherever I Lay My Phone (That's My Home)" could not be issued in any case following the December 1999 release of "I Wanna 1-2-1 With You" by Jimmy Cauty's Solid Gold Chartbusters, which was "based on the same Nokia ringtone".

"Do or Die" was issued on CD, cassette and 7" on 17 January 2000, the band's last release for Creation, and reached number 20 in the UK Singles Chart. The track became the shortest song ever to be performed on the BBC's Top Of The Pops programme when the group appeared on the show to promote the single's release. The track was included on the band's 'greatest hits' compilation album Songbook: The Singles, Vol. 1, issued in 2004.

"Do or Die" was awarded 'Single of the Week' in the January 19–25, 2000 issue of the Melody Maker by guest reviewers Pär Wiksten and Christina Bergmark from The Wannadies who gave the track "all the points we can afford" and claimed that it ends perfectly. The NME described the song as "not the best track from ... Guerrilla, but then not the worst either" and claimed that it was mostly of note because it was the second single by Super Furry Animals to be less than two minutes long following 1996's "God! Show Me Magic". Despite stating that there was "no need whatsoever" for the release, the NME ranked "Do or Die" at number 55 in their single of the year list for 2000. In a 2005 review of the reissued Guerrilla, Pitchfork described the track as "near-perfect sunny pop" while, in an earlier review of Songbook: The Singles, Vol. 1, the website called "Do or Die" "proggy quasi-Britpop" and likened its guitar part to "Jessica" by The Allman Brothers Band. Also reviewing Songbook..., the BBC described "Do or Die" as one of several "great hairy rock outs" on the record, The Washington Post called it "straightforward pop-punk" and Drowned in Sound labelled it a "guitar-laden sugar rush". Website Cokemachineglow likened the track to the work of The Stooges. Pitchfork claimed that the single's b-sides, the "inescapably sha-la-la-ing 'Colorblind'" and the "piano-accented bounder" "Missunderstanding (sic)", pale beside "Do or Die" and the other tracks on Guerilla although they "do manage to scratch the itch for more SFA".

=== Accolades ===
Publication	Country	Accolade	Year	Rank
Melody Maker	United Kingdom	Single of the week January 19–25	2000	–
NME	United Kingdom	Singles of 2000	2000	55
Q	United Kingdom	1010 Songs You Must Own!: Q50 – #4: Short & to the Point	2004	*

* denotes an unordered list

== Music video ==
The video for "Do or Die" features Super Furry Animals playing along to the track in a room in a cartoon house. Brightly coloured animations of the group's bodies and surroundings are mixed with live action footage of their heads and instruments. This screenshot shows, from left to right, singer Gruff Rhys, drummer Dafydd Ieuan and guitarist Huw Bunford.

A promotional music video was produced to accompany the release of "Do or Die" as a single. The video was directed by Jake & Jim who also directed the video for the group's previous single, "Fire in My Heart".

The video begins with the camera zooming in through the door of a cartoon house in the desert to reveal Super Furry Animals playing along to the track in a room. The band's heads and instruments are live action footage, filmed in London, while their bodies and surroundings are brightly coloured animations. During the first verse, shots of the group playing the track in the room are intercut with images of band members on cartoon surfboards superimposed onto real life footage of giant waves. This process is repeated during the second chorus, with the video cutting between shots of the band playing in the room and images of the band superimposed onto live footage of tornados. After 1 minute and 4 seconds images of the group's heads being swept along in a lava flow are intercut with the band playing along with the track in the now red room with lava visible through the windows. Snow then begins to fall in the room and the video cuts to shots of the group escaping an avalanche in a bobsled. As the track ends the lightbulb in the room begins to swing frantically and Super Furry Animals are bathed in a green "radioactive or alien glow". A shot of the house in front of a nuclear explosion cuts to footage of the band frozen mid-word, with the camera moving through 360 degrees to reveal them as two dimensional cutouts. The "Do or Die" music video was named as 'Video of the week' in the 12–18 January issue of Melody Maker and was included on the DVD release of the band's greatest hits album, Songbook: The Singles, Vol. 1.

== Track listing ==
All songs by Super Furry Animals.

- CD with fold-out poster (CRESCD329), MC (CRES329), 7" (CRE329)
1. "Do or Die" – 2:04
2. "Missunderstanding (sic)" – 3:22
3. "Colorblind" – 3:34

== Personnel ==
- Gruff Rhys – vocals
- Huw Bunford – guitar
- Guto Pryce – bass guitar
- Cian Ciaran – keyboards
- Dafydd Ieuan – drums

== Singles chart position ==
Chart	Peak position
UK Singles Chart	20
