= Fire in My Heart =

Single by Super Furry Animals

from the album Guerrilla
- Released: 9 August 1999
- Recorded: Real World Studios, Box, Wiltshire
- Genre: Alternative rock, psychedelic folk, gospel
- Length: 2:45
- Label: Creation Records
- Songwriter(s): Super Furry Animals
- Producer(s): Super Furry Animals

Super Furry Animals singles chronology
"Northern Lites" (1999)	"Fire in My Heart" (1999)	"Do or Die" (2000)

"Fire in My Heart" is the tenth single by Welsh rock band Super Furry Animals. It was the second single to be taken from the group's 1999 album Guerrilla, and reached number 25 in the UK Singles Chart after its release on 9 August 1999. The track, originally titled "Heartburn", has been described by the band's singer Gruff Rhys as a country and western song with lyrics that offer "soul advice".

Critical reaction to "Fire in My Heart" was generally positive with the NME stating that it confirmed the band's position as the best British singles band in "ages and ages" and placing the track at number 25 in their singles of the year chart for 1999. The music video for the song was directed by Jake & Jim and shows Super Furry Animals waiting to leave the planet Mars, having played a concert there.

== Themes and recording ==
"Fire in My Heart" was originally called "Heartburn", a name which the group's singer Gruff Rhys felt was more poignant and gave the song "a twist", but other members of the band were not happy with the title so the name was changed. Rhys has described the track as a country and western song which was written with absolute sincerity despite featuring clichéd lyrics. The song is "soul advice" and is about "all kinds of people in your life". The track was recorded in the middle of 1998 at Real World Studios, Box, Wiltshire, along with the rest of Guerrilla, and was produced by the Super Furry Animals. B-side "The Matter of Time" was considered for inclusion on Guerrilla, but the band felt the album would be too self-indulgent if the song were added to the record's track listing. The group instead opted to include the "stupid" song "The Teacher", a decision which Rhys has called a decisive moment in the creation of the record.

== Composition ==
"Fire in My Heart" (1999)
Short sample from "Fire in My Heart" featuring the track's third verse. The clip illustrates the harmony backing vocals which accompany main vocalist Gruff Rhys and the organ and drums which form much of the instrumental backing.

"Fire in My Heart" is 2 minutes and 45 seconds long and is in the key of E major. The song begins with Gruff Rhys singing the first verse backed only by finger picked acoustic guitar. Rhys's vocals are joined by sparse drums, a synthesizer, organ and harmony backing vocals in the second verse which immediately follows the first at 31 seconds. The drums become louder during the third and final verse which leads into a bridge that begins after 1 minute and 31 seconds. During the bridge Rhys sings the lines "Oh the monkey puzzle tree has some questions for the watchdogs of the profane, and I ask, is it sad that I'm driving myself mad as this fire in my heart turns blue". A key change to F♯ major follows for the final verse, with Rhys repeating the line "I've got a fire in my heart for you" backed by multiple harmony vocals. The song ends with a coda during which Rhys elongates the word "you" over the chords A♯ minor, A, G♯ minor and F♯.

== Release and critical reception ==
"Fire in My Heart" was released on CD, cassette and 7" on 9 August 1999, and reached number 25 in the UK Singles Chart. The track was included on the band's 'greatest hits' compilation album Songbook: The Singles, Vol. 1, issued in 2004.

The Melody Maker called the track a "lovely song, a real scarf-waver", although the magazine expressed disappointment that "Fire in My Heart" did not see the band "howling at the moon in their more deep-throated manner". American model Caprice–in the role of guest reviewer for the Melody Maker–likened the song to the music of Carole King and Rickie Lee Jones and said that the track is "just about the words" and is an example of the sort of music that "never goes out of fashion". The NME described the song as a "bizarre psychedelic-folk-gospel record" and said that it confirmed the band's position as the best British singles band "in ages and ages". The magazine later placed the track at number 35 in their singles of the year chart for 1999. Yahoo! Music called the track a heartbreaking song of "staggering genius". Mojo described "Fire in My Heart" as "trad-sounding" four chord folk, while Pitchfork stated that the track was a song of "country endearments". The BBC called "Fire in My Heart" an "idiosyncratic love song". The song was placed at number 17 in the 1999 Festive Fifty on John Peel's BBC Radio 1 show.

=== Accolades ===
Publication	Country	Accoladej	Year	Rank
John Peel show, BBC Radio 1	United Kingdom	John Peel's Festive 50	1999	17
NME	United Kingdom	Singles of 1999	1999	35

== Music video ==
The aliens in the music video, seen here behind singer Gruff Rhys, were designed by regular Super Furry Animals collaborator Pete Fowler

A promotional music video was produced to accompany the release of "Fire in My Heart" as a single. The video was directed by Jake & Jim, who also directed the video for the group's subsequent single "Do or Die", and shows the Super Furry Animals waiting to leave Mars having played a concert on the planet.

The video begins with Gruff Rhys standing alone on the Martian soil, singing along to the song. A silver, computer generated, spaceship is seen landing behind Rhys. Around one minute into the track the camera pans back to reveal the rest of the Super Furry Animals sitting down to the left of Rhys. Guitarist Huw Bunford is sat on the floor playing an acoustic guitar while the rest of the group are sat on three metal seats which are connected together. Two aliens are seen walking from the spacecraft towards the band while drummer Dafydd Ieuan pours some of the Martian sand through his hands. When the aliens arrive, one of them, with a bald head, sunglasses and pointy ears, places his left hand on Rhys's right shoulder. Rhys turns around and looks at the other alien who has one eye in the centre of a large round face and is wearing a blue hoodie. The alien smiles at Rhys who then turns around and looks up to see the Earth in the sky above. Ieuan and keyboardist Cian Ciaran are also shown looking at the Earth before the camera moves behind them to reveal hundreds of aliens stood in front of several minaret-like towers, waving at the group. The band are shown picking up a suitcase and guitar before walking towards the spaceship as the song finishes. The aliens were designed by regular Super Furry Animals collaborator Pete Fowler, who acted as "creative advisor" for the video. According to Rhys the aliens were animated by the same special effects team that worked on Star Wars: Episode I – The Phantom Menace. Rhys has stated that he considers his performance in the video to be "wooden" as he was forced to take painkillers during the shoot due to a "stiff neck".

== Track listing ==
All songs by Super Furry Animals.

- CD (CRESCD323), MC (CRECS323), 7" (CRE323)
1. "Fire in My Heart" – 2:45
2. "The Matter of Time" – 5:46
3. "Mrs. Spector" – 3:02

== Personnel ==
The following people contributed to "Fire in my Heart":

- Gruff Rhys – vocals
- Huw Bunford – guitar
- Guto Pryce – bass guitar
- Cian Ciaran – keyboards
- Dafydd Ieuan – drums

== Singles chart positions ==
Chart	Peak position
UK Singles Chart	25
