= Northern Lites =

Single by Super Furry Animals

from the album Guerrilla
- Released: 10 May 1999
- Recorded: Real World Studios, Box, Wiltshire
- Genre: Alternative rock; calypso
- Length: 3:31
- Label: Creation Records
- Songwriter(s): Super Furry Animals
- Producer(s): Super Furry Animals

Super Furry Animals singles chronology
"Demons" (1997)	"Northern Lites" (1999)	"Fire in My Heart" (1999)

"Northern Lites" is the ninth single by Super Furry Animals. It was the first single to be taken from the Guerrilla album and reached number 11 in the UK Singles Chart after its release on 10 May 1999. The song was written by singer Gruff Rhys and was inspired by the El Niño phenomenon. The track's title refers to the Aurora Borealis, a natural light display which the band were convinced they had seen prior to the song being written. Rhys wrote the melody for "Northern Lites" several years before it was completed but only decided on a calypso style after he wrote the lyrics. The steel drums on the track are played by keyboardist Cian Ciaran and were added on the spur of the moment after the group saw them "lying around" Real World Studios during recording.

Critical reaction was largely positive with the song being named "Single of the Week" in both the Melody Maker and NME, with the latter also listing the song at number 3 in their single of the year list for 1999. The music video for "Northern Lites" was directed by Super Furry Animals and Martin McCarthy and consists of stock footage of curling and Irish road bowling although Rhys has blamed the song's failure to chart higher on the fact that it "didn't have a video".

== Themes and recording ==
"Northern Lites" was written by singer Gruff Rhys about "the weather", and was particularly inspired by coverage of the "terrifying, worldwide, seven-year phenomenon" of the west Pacific El Niño climate pattern on "weather channels" in 1998. The song's title refers to the Aurora Borealis, a natural light display which can be observed particularly in the polar regions, and usually at night. The band were convinced that they had seen the lights before the track was written but, as no one else was present, they could not get confirmation that what they had witnessed was not simply a "Furry fantasy". Rhys has claimed that he would have called the song "Aurora Borealis" but "Latin song titles are out of the question". Although Rhys has said that the song is "about asking Jesus if he decides to seek his revenge on us, to get it over with as soon as possible and blow us away to the Northern Lights" he has also stated that, although some critics have interpreted the track as being about "questioning one's faith", it is really "just a song about the weather".

The melody of "Northern Lites" was written by Rhys several years before the track was released. The band experimented with reggae and "dirgy rock" styles before Rhys wrote the lyrics and, because they were inspired by adverse weather conditions affecting Latin America, tried playing along to a preset calypso rhythm track which was on his keyboard. (Note: Although 'Latin America' can sometimes be used to refer to only the territories in the Americas where Spanish and Portuguese languages prevail, the term can also refer to all of the Americas south of the United States. In interviews regarding "Northern Lites" Rhys uses the term in the latter sense.) The singer has stated that, although he does not think the band have "any right to make Latin-influenced" songs, they did not choose a calypso style for the track in a cynical attempt to "crack South America". The group are not "purists" and feel that Latin music is "part of [a] cultural esperanto".

The track was recorded in the middle of 1998 at Real World Studios, Box, Wiltshire, along with the rest of Guerrilla, and was produced by Super Furry Animals. The band allowed "the music to dictate itself" during recording sessions, choosing to add steel drums on the spur of the moment after seeing the instruments "lying around" Real World during recording. The steel drum parts were performed by keyboardist Cian Ciaran, despite the fact he did not know how to play them.

== Composition ==
"Northern Lites" (1999)
Short sample from "Northern Lites" featuring the track's "play out". The clip illustrates the breakdown which occurs in the section, the harmony backing vocals which accompany main vocalist Gruff Rhys and the melody lines played by both the brass section and lead guitar.

"Northern Lites" is 3 minute and 31 seconds long and is in the key of E major. The song begins with an intro with steel drums, featuring a flanging effect, before a brass section enters after 6 seconds playing a melody line accompanied by a güiro, sparse drums and an acoustic guitar playing the chords F#m^{7} and B. The melody line plays twice after which Gruff Rhys begins singing the first verse alongside the güiro, guitar and steel drums which no longer have a flange effect. Towards the end of the verse a distorted guitar melody line plays alongside Rhys's vocal and harmony backing vocals enter. The song's first chorus begins at 48 seconds with Rhys singing "There's a distant light, a forest fire burning everything in sight". During the second verse the brass section rejoins, playing the same melody line from the intro. After another chorus the song's extended "play-out" section begins at 2 minutes and 13 seconds with Rhys repeating the lines "Don't worry me, or hurry me, blow me far away to the Northern Lites" accompanied by harmony backing vocals. The track breaks down to just drums and vocals at 2 minutes and 40 seconds after which the band and brass section rejoin. A prominent lead guitar melody begins after 2 minutes and 47 seconds and plays alongside the vocals, acoustic guitar, brass and drums until the track fades out and ends at 3 minutes and 31 seconds.

== Release and critical reception ==
"Northern Lites" was released on CD, cassette and 7" on 10 May 1999 and reached number 11 on the UK Singles Chart. The cover features a model of a "three-eyed, four-armed, squid-headed Eskimo warrior" designed by artist Pete Fowler. The warrior is shown holding "two portable poles of latitude and longitude" and has "the heating regulator of the world" around his neck. The track was included on the band's greatest hits compilation album Songbook: The Singles, Vol. 1, issued in 2004.

"Northern Lites" received mostly positive reviews. The NME listed the song as the "Single of the Week" on its release, with reviewer Johnny Cigarettes stating that the track was "head and shoulders above anything released this or most other weeks". Cigarettes saw "Northern Lites" as indicative of the Super Furry Animals' "genius idiosyncrasy and elegantly eccentric class" and described the song as "somewhere between a Mexican cocktail bar, a '60s surf party, a Vegas lounge show and a really good acid trip". Cigarettes compared the vocal harmonies on the track to those of The Beach Boys and stated that the song has a "classic, Bacharach" quality" although he did criticise the indecipherable lyrics which he felt could prevent the record from "its deserved 23-week residence at Number One". In a later review of Guerrilla, the NME described the song as a "seamless fusion of tumbling xylophones and Caribbean brass". The magazine listed the track at number 3 in their single of the year list for 1999. "Northern Lites" was also awarded "Single of the Week" in the 15 May 1999 issue of the Melody Maker by guest reviewers Gay Dad, who described the song as "twisted and psychedelic". Echoing the views of Johnny Cigarettes, Gay Dad likened the song to the work of Bacharach and Hal David and complained that they could not fully understand Rhys's lyrics, as his vocals were too low in the mix.

Writing for Mojo, James McNair described "Northern Lites" as a mix of "Tijuana brass, steel drums, and itch-scratching Latin percussion" and claimed that the "great" song was "one of the most frothily inventive pop confections" since Super Furry Animals' 1998 track, "Ice Hockey Hair". In Q, reviewer Peter Kane stated that the song's combination of "cheesy calypso sway" and "Tijuana brass" were wonderful. Dave Simpson, writing in The Guardian, claimed that the song was "possibly the first hit to be massively influenced by Tito Puente." In The Independent, Tim Perry stated that the "undeniably brilliant" "Northern Lites" was one of the highlights of the Guerrilla album. In a 2005 review of the reissued Guerrilla, Pitchfork's Marc Hogan described the track as "horn-laden tropicalia"; in an earlier review of Songbook: The Singles, Vol. 1, he had called "Northern Lites" "'Deadweight'-era Beck tropicalia". Reviewing Songbook... for PopMatters, Zeth Lundy described "Northern Lites" as "Brazilian-infected", while Ian Wade, reviewing the album for the BBC, called the song an "indie/calypso crossover" and Alan Woodhouse, reviewing Songbook... for the NME labelled the track an "irresistible Caribbean-flavoured tune." Marc Hogan of Pitchfork claimed that the single's b-sides, including the "shiny, distorted mid-tempo number" "This, That and the Other", pale beside "Northern Lites" and the other tracks on Guerilla although they "do manage to scratch the itch for more SFA".

=== Accolades ===
Publication	Country	Accolade	Year	Rank
Iguana Music	Spain	Songs '99	1999	7
John Peel show, BBC Radio 1	United Kingdom	John Peel's Festive 50	1999	24
Melody Maker	United Kingdom	Single of the Week 15 May 1999	1999	–
NME	United Kingdom	Single of the Week 8 May 1999	1999	–
NME	United Kingdom	Singles of 1999	1999	3
Select	United Kingdom	Singles of 1999	1999	22

== Music video ==
A promotional music video, directed by Super Furry Animals and Martin McCarthy, was produced to accompany the release of "Northern Lites" as a single.

The video begins with a shot of Super Furry Animals' 'SFA' logo, which appears on the cover of "Northern Lites", displayed above the words "Public information service". This shot fades to show a full-screen translucent, fluorescent blue, image of the "warrior", also from the single's cover, which moves from the centre to the bottom right before shrinking and remaining stationary in the top right for the duration of the video. The SFA logo from the introduction is shown in the top left, opposite the "warrior" image, and also remains throughout the video. The island Ailsa Craig is briefly shown, the island where in 2004 when the single was released, 60 to 70% of all curling stones in use were made from granite from the island and is one of only two sources for all stones in the sport, the other being the Trefor Granite Quarry in Wales. Next, images of the sea and birds in flight are shown before footage of a bearded man, sitting on rocks beside the sea and singing along to the first verse is shown. This footage is intercut with shots of a man using a hammer and chisel on some boulders before walking away with a large rock. The rock is shown being spun and polished into a curling stone. A yellow handle is added to the stone and it is placed into a wooden box alongside another stone with a red handle. The box is closed and the word Nagano is seen printed on the lid. The video then cuts to shots of a Boeing 747 before wintery scenes of Nagano are shown, including a shot of people with umbrellas stood in the snow in front of a sign that reads "Nagano Olympics". Footage from curling events are then shown until 2 minutes and 40 seconds when the video cuts to show a man in a grey suit dropping a handful of grass on a road. The video then ends with shots of Irish road bowling–several men are shown throwing a bowl down a road surrounded by spectators alongside scenes of men with measuring sticks and men exchanging banknotes. In a 2008 interview with Uncut, Gruff Rhys stated that "Northern Lites" "didn't have a video" and suggested this as the reason the track was not a bigger hit than it was. The director who was originally scheduled to work on the video took up an offer of a Red Stripe commercial in Jamaica, leaving the band to collaborate with McCarthy. According to Rhys the group met the original director later and told him "We understand, we'd have done the same." Despite this, bassist Guto Pryce has described the "Northern Lites" music video as one of only a handful of the group's videos that he actually likes.

== Track listing ==
All songs by Super Furry Animals.

- CD (CRESCD314), MC (CRES314), 7" (CRE314)
1. "Northern Lites" – 3:30
2. "Rabid Dog" – 3:47
3. "This, That and the Other " – 5:59

== Personnel ==
- Gruff Rhys – vocals
- Huw Bunford – guitar
- Guto Pryce – bass guitar
- Cian Ciaran – keyboards, steel drums
- Dafydd Ieuan – drums
- Steve Waterman - trumpet
- A D Gibson - trumpet
- Andrew Robinson - trombone
- Euros Wyn - flute
- Kris Jenkins - percussion

== Singles chart position ==
Chart	Peak position
UK Singles Chart	11
