= Placid Casual =

Cardiff-based record label

Placid Casual logo

Placid Casual is the Cardiff based record label set up in 1998 by Super Furry Animals. It is named after the track "The Placid Casual" on their album Radiator.

According to the label's website "Placid Casual retains an amateur status and an a&r policy of blatant nepotism. We exist to expose to the world (when we can be bothered), songs that come our way that may be ignored otherwise." The Independent has described the label as an "enterprise run by passion not for profit".

After founding the label in 1998 in order to release Psycho VII's "Just Another Fun Love Song", Super Furry Animals released their Welsh language album Mwng on the label in 2000. They later left to sign with Epic Records.

Gruff Rhys also released his debut solo album, Yr Atal Genhedlaeth, on the label in 2005.

== See also ==
- List of record labels
