= NME Album of the Year =

Annual list in British music magazine NME

Every December, British music magazine NME compiles a list of what it considers the best albums of the year. It was started in 1974. The list is usually published in one of the issues sold before Christmas – in 2006 it was published in the issue for December the 9th. The companion list is NME single of the year.

The NME Album of the Year list is compiled by the music reviewers and independent journalists who work for the magazine and for NME.com. Each picks his or her top 20 albums of the year and hands them in to the editor. An album marked at Number One gets 20 points, Number Two gets 19 points and so on until the 20th, which gets one point. All of the points from the various top 20s are then gathered together and the overall favourites are worked out and ranked for publication in the official list. The album with the most points overall is Number One in the list, the one with the second most points is Number Two and so on.

Sometimes, winners may change in the NME Awards. For example, the NME Album of the Year for 2000 was Rated R by Queens of the Stone Age, with XTRMNTR by Primal Scream in 2nd place, XTRMNTR was later voted the best album of 2000 however in the NME Carling Awards 2001.

== Albums of the Year ==
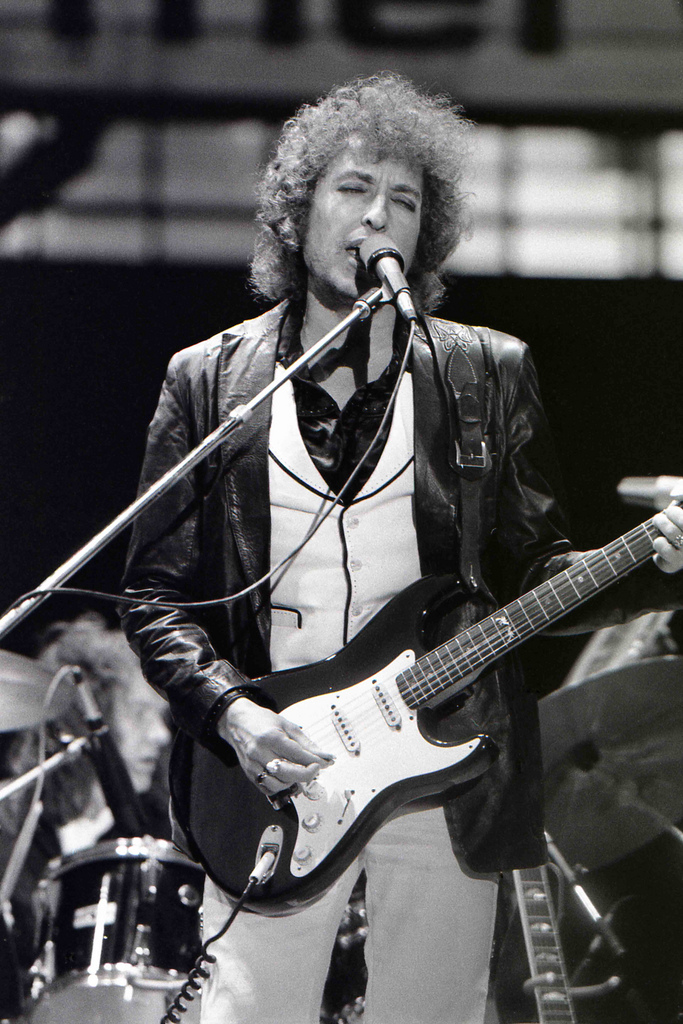
Bob Dylan was the first artist to top NME's albums list more than once, in 1975 and 1976.

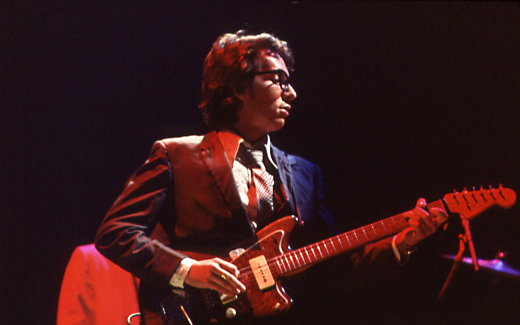
NME named Punch the Clock by Elvis Costello as the greatest album of 1983.

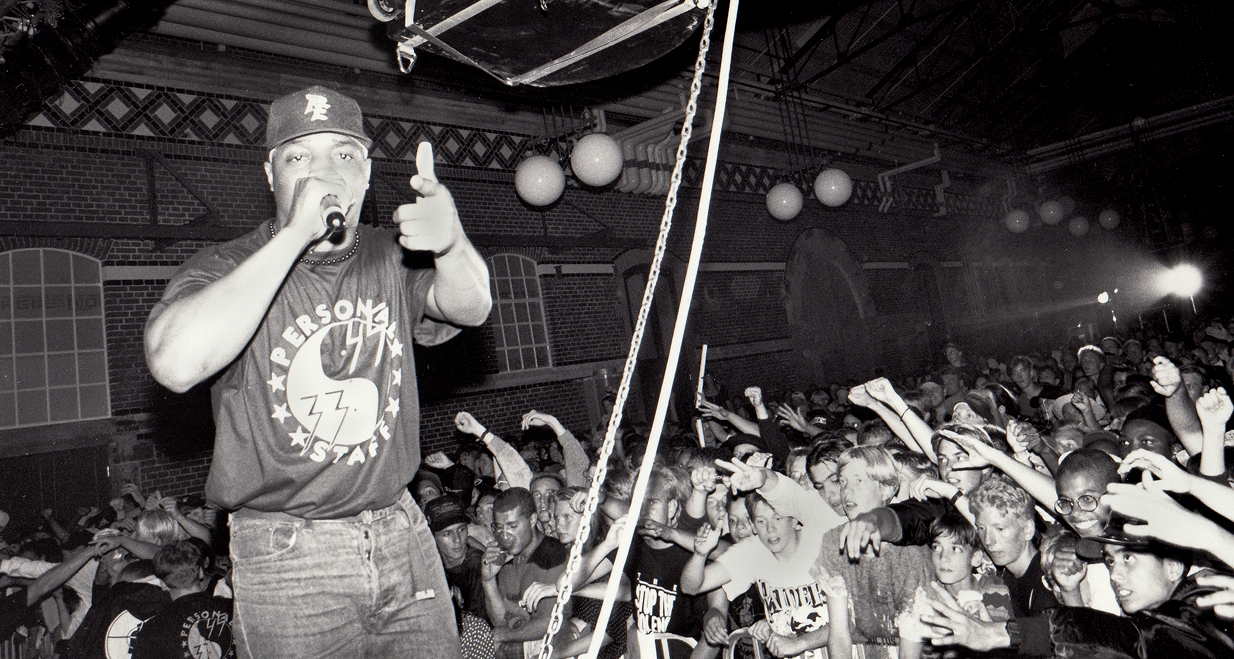
Hip-hop group Public Enemy topped NME's albums lists in consecutive years, 1987 and 1988.

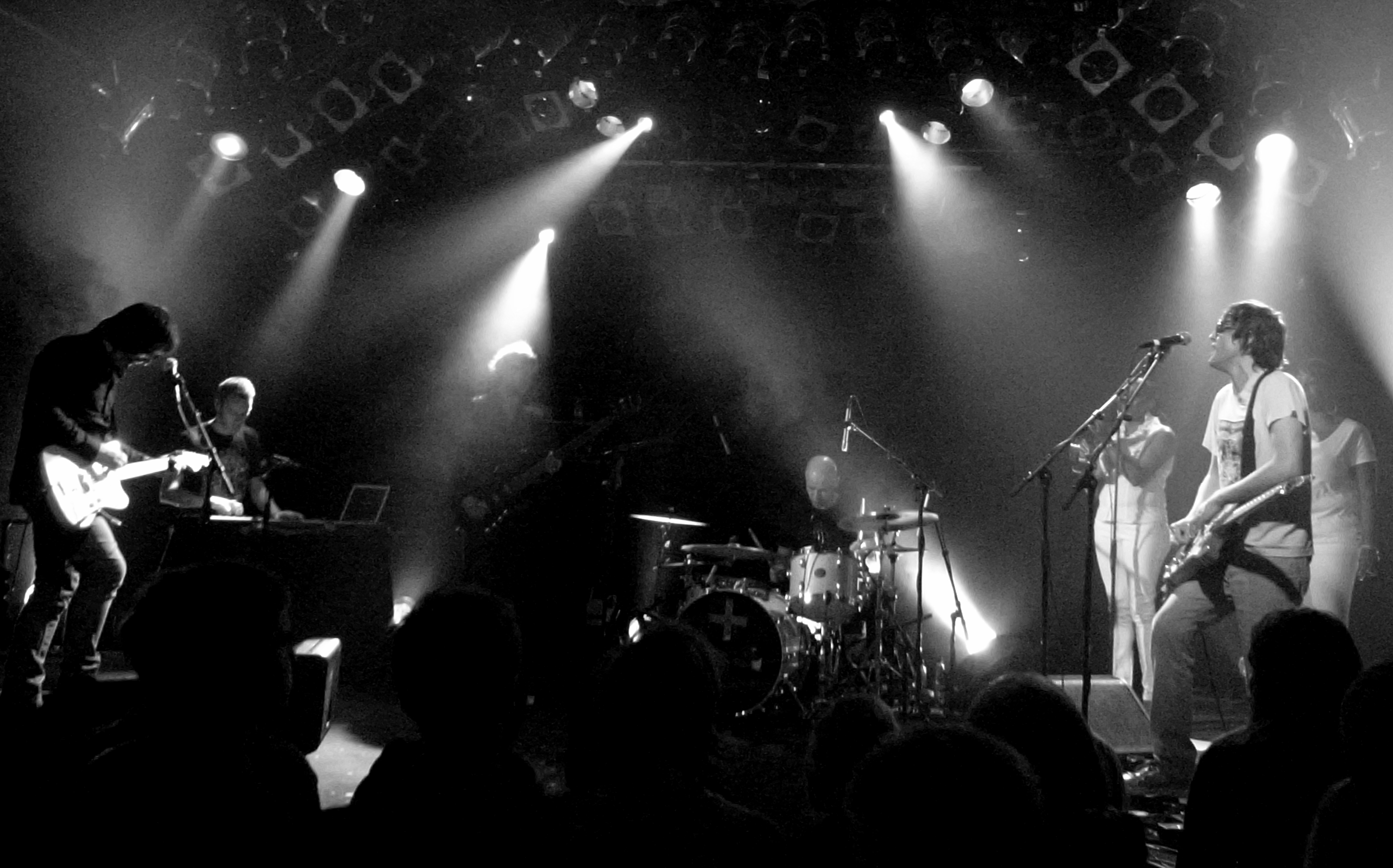
Spiritualized's album Ladies and Gentlemen We Are Floating in Space was named the best album of 1997.

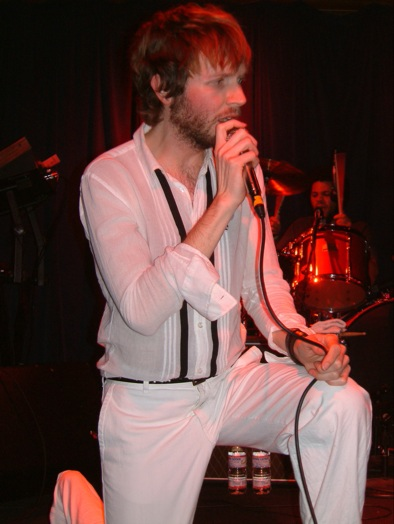
Odelay by Beck was NME's number-one album of 1996.

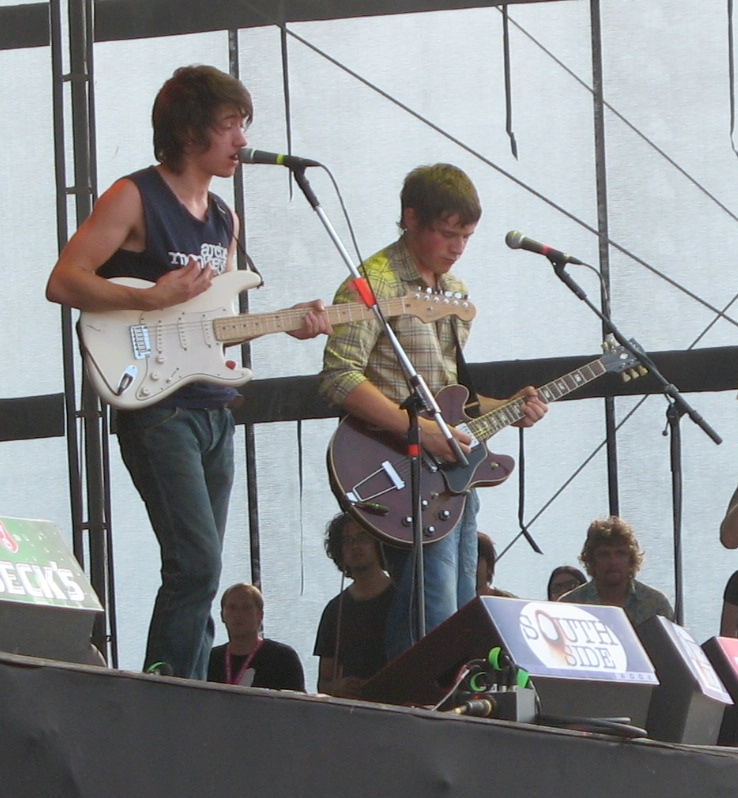
Arctic Monkeys are one of three acts to have topped the listing more than once.

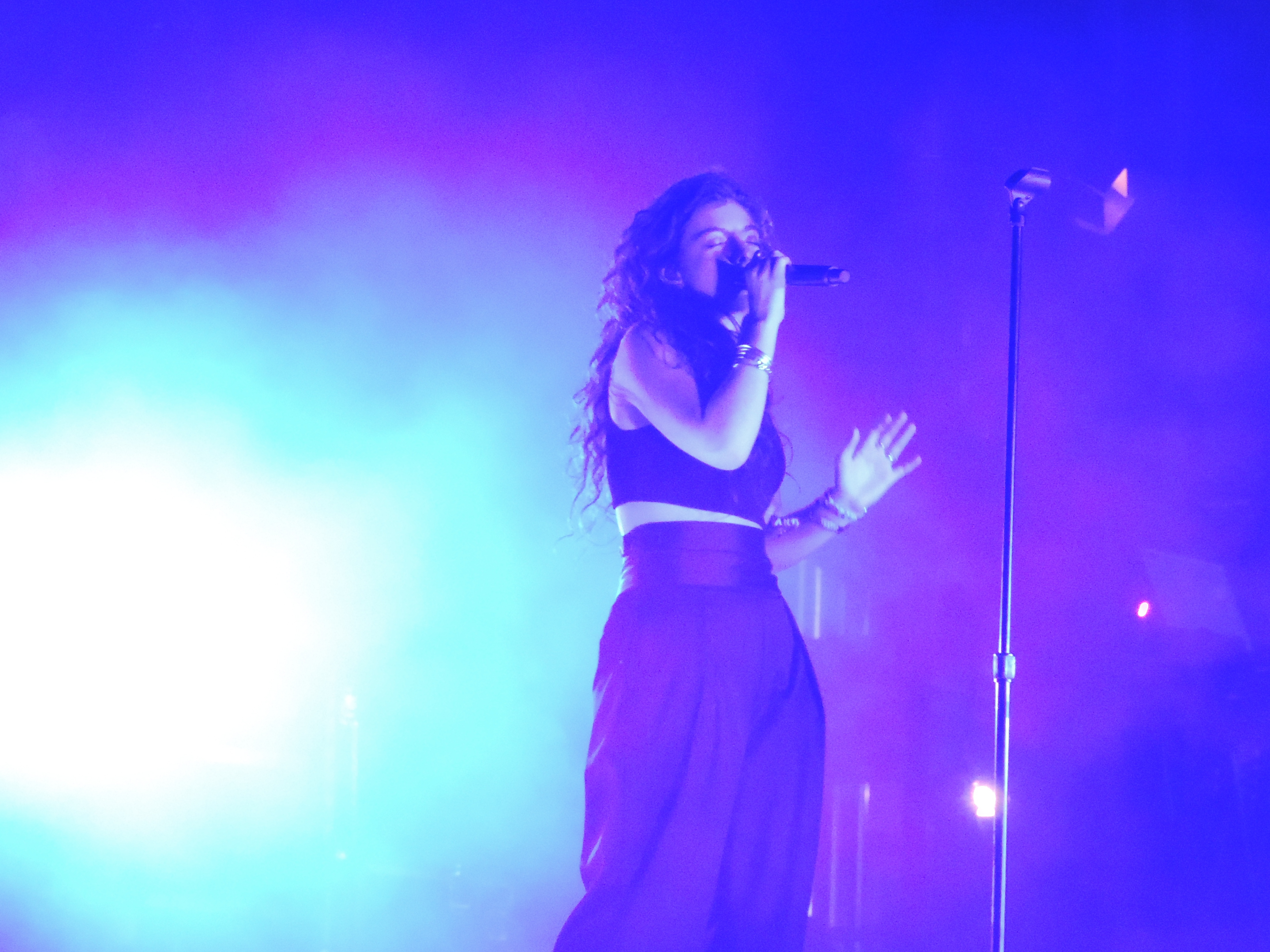
Lorde won the 2017 Album of the Year award for her album Melodrama

Year	Artist	Album	Top five
1974	Steely Dan	Pretzel Logic	2nd: The Rolling Stones – It's Only Rock 'n' Roll; 3rd: Bob Dylan – Before the Flood; 4th: Eric Clapton – 461 Ocean Boulevard; 5th: Todd Rundgren – Todd
1975	Bob Dylan	Blood on the Tracks	2nd: Bob Marley & The Wailers – Natty Dread; 3rd: Bob Marley & The Wailers – Live; 4th: Little Feat – The Last Record Album; 5th: Nils Lofgren – Nils Lofgren
1976	Bob Dylan	Desire	2nd: David Bowie – Station to Station; 3rd: Dr. Feelgood – Stupidity; 4th: Graham Parker – Heat Treatment; 5th: The Ramones – The Ramones
1977	David Bowie	"Heroes"	2nd: Ian Dury – New Boots and Panties!!; 3rd: Elvis Costello – My Aim is True; 4th: Sex Pistols – Never Mind the Bollocks, Here's the Sex Pistols; 5th: Television – Marquee Moon
1978	Bruce Springsteen	Darkness on the Edge of Town	2nd: The Jam – All Mod Cons; 3rd: Elvis Costello – This Year's Model; 4th: Talking Heads – More Songs About Buildings & Food; 5th: Culture – Africa Stand Alone
1979	Talking Heads	Fear of Music	2nd: Public Image Ltd. – Metal Box; 3rd: Joy Division – Unknown Pleasures; 4th: The Jam – Setting Sons; 5th: Gang of Four – Entertainment!
1980	Joy Division	Closer	2nd: Elvis Costello – Get Happy!!; 3rd: The Beat – I Just Can't Stop It; 4th: Black Uhuru – Sinsemilla; 5th: Holger Czukay – Movies
1981	Grace Jones	Nightclubbing	2nd: Kraftwerk – Computer World; 3rd: Black Uhuru – Red; 4th: The Beat – Wha'ppen?; 5th: Heaven 17 – Penthouse and Pavement
1982	Marvin Gaye	Midnight Love	2nd: Elvis Costello – Imperial Bedroom; 3rd: ABC – The Lexicon of Love; 4th: The Clash – Combat Rock; 5th: Dexy's Midnight Runners – Too-Rye-Ay
1983	Elvis Costello	Punch the Clock	2nd: Tom Waits – Swordfishtrombone; 3rd: Billy Bragg – Life's a Riot with Spy vs Spy; 4th: Soft Cell – The Art of Falling Apart; 5th: Michael Jackson – Thriller
1984	Bobby Womack	The Poet II	2nd: Bruce Springsteen – Born in the USA; 3rd: The Special AKA – In the Studio; 4th: Womack and Womack – Love Wars; 5th: Scott Walker – Climate of Hunter
1985	Tom Waits	Rain Dogs	2nd: The Jesus & Mary Chain – Psychocandy; 3rd: The Velvet Underground – VU; 4th: Prefab Sprout – Steve McQueen; 5th: Madness – Mad Not Mad
1986	Prince & The Revolution	Parade	2nd: Anita Baker – Rapture; 3rd: Janet Jackson – Control; 4th: Sonic Youth – Evol; 5th: Cameo – Word Up!
1987	Public Enemy	Yo! Bum Rush the Show	2nd: Prince – Sign o' the Times; 3rd: The Smiths – Strangeways Here We Come; 4th: Sonic Youth – Sister; 5th: Tom Waits – Frank's Wild Years
1988	Public Enemy	It Takes a Nation of Millions to Hold Us Back	2nd: Van Morrison and the Chieftains – Irish Heartbeat; 3rd: R.E.M. – Green; 4th: Morrissey – Viva Hate; 5th: The Todd Terry Project – To the Batmobile Let's Go
1989	De La Soul	3 Feet and Rising	2nd: The Stone Roses – The Stone Roses; 3rd: Lou Reed – New York; 4th: Pixies – Doolittle; 5th: New Order – Technique
1990	Happy Mondays	Pills 'n' Thrills and Bellyaches	2nd: Sinéad O'Connor – I Do Not Want What I Haven't Got; 3rd: Public Enemy – Fear of a Black Planet; 4th: Neil Young & Crazy Horse – Ragged Glory; 5th: James – Gold Mother
1991	Nirvana	Nevermind	2nd: Teenage Fanclub – Bandwagonesque; 3rd: Primal Scream – Screamadelica; 4th: Neil Young & Crazy Horse – Weld; 5th: R.E.M. – Out of Time
1992	Sugar	Copper Blue	2nd: R.E.M. – Automatic for the People; 3rd: Spiritualized – Lazer Guided Melodies; 4th: The Lemonheads – It's a Shame About Ray; 5th: Nick Cave and the Bad Seeds – Henry's Dream
1993	Björk	Debut	2nd: The Boo Radleys – Giant Steps; 3rd: Suede – Suede; 4th: The Lemonheads – Come on Feel the Lemonheads; 5th: Belly – Star
1994	Oasis	Definitely Maybe	2nd: Blur – Parklife; 3rd: Beastie Boys – Ill Communication; 4th: Nirvana – Unplugged in New York; 5th: Manic Street Preachers – The Holy Bible
1995	Tricky	Maxinquaye	2nd: Oasis – (What's the Story) Morning Glory; 3rd: Black Grape – It's Great When You're Straight...Yeah; 4th: Radiohead – The Bends; 5th: Teenage Fanclub – Grand Prix
1996	Beck	Odelay	2nd: Manic Street Preachers – Everything Must Go; 3rd: Orbital – In Sides; 4th: Super Furry Animals – Fuzzy Logic; 5th: DJ Shadow – Endtroducing.....
1997	Spiritualized	Ladies and Gentlemen We Are Floating in Space	2nd: Radiohead – OK Computer; 3rd: The Verve – Urban Hymns; 4th: Primal Scream – Vanishing Point; 5th: Super Furry Animals – Radiator
1998	Mercury Rev	Deserter's Songs	2nd: Beastie Boys – Hello Nasty; 3rd: Beck – Mutations; 4th: Air – Moon Safari; 5th: Massive Attack – Mezzanine
1999	The Flaming Lips	The Soft Bulletin	2nd: Shack – HMS Fable; 3rd: Super Furry Animals – Guerrilla; 4th: Death in Vegas – The Contino Sessions; 5th: Beck – Midnite Vultures
2000	Queens of the Stone Age	Rated R	2nd: Primal Scream – XTRMNTR; 3rd: PJ Harvey – Stories from the City, Stories from the Sea; 4th: Badly Drawn Boy – The Hour of Bewilderbeast; 5th: At the Drive-In – Relationship of Command
2001	The Strokes	Is This It	2nd: Spiritualized – Let It Come Down; 3rd: The White Stripes – White Blood Cells; 4th: Jay-Z – The Blueprint; 5th: Starsailor – Love Is Here
2002	Coldplay	A Rush of Blood to the Head	2nd: The Vines – Highly Evolved; 3rd: The Streets – Original Pirate Material; 4th: The Coral – The Coral; 5th: Black Rebel Motorcycle Club – BRMC
2003	The White Stripes	Elephant	2nd: The Rapture – Echoes; 3rd: The Strokes – Room on Fire; 4th: Elbow – Cast of Thousands; 5th: Yeah Yeah Yeahs – Fever to Tell
2004	Franz Ferdinand	Franz Ferdinand	2nd: The Libertines – The Libertines; 3rd: The Streets – A Grand Don't Come for Free; 4th: Scissor Sisters – Scissor Sisters; 5th: The Futureheads – The Futureheads
2005	Bloc Party	Silent Alarm	2nd: Arcade Fire – Funeral; 3rd: Franz Ferdinand – You Could Have It So Much Better; 4th: Antony & the Johnsons – I Am a Bird Now; 5th: Kaiser Chiefs – Employment
2006	Arctic Monkeys	Whatever People Say I Am, That's What I'm Not	2nd: Yeah Yeah Yeahs – Show Your Bones; 3rd: Muse – Black Holes and Revelations; 4th: Hot Chip – The Warning; 5th: CSS – Cansei de Ser Sexy
2007	Klaxons	Myths of the Near Future	2nd: Arctic Monkeys – Favourite Worst Nightmare; 3rd: Radiohead – In Rainbows; 4th: Arcade Fire – Neon Bible; 5th: Les Savy Fav – Let's Stay Friends
2008	MGMT	Oracular Spectacular	2nd: TV on the Radio – Dear Science; 3rd: Glasvegas – Glasvegas; 4th: Vampire Weekend – Vampire Weekend; 5th: Foals – Antidotes
2009	The Horrors	Primary Colours	2nd: The xx – xx; 3rd: Yeah Yeah Yeahs – It's Blitz; 4th: Wild Beasts – Two Dancers; 5th: Animal Collective – Merriweather Post Pavilion
2010	These New Puritans	Hidden	2nd: Arcade Fire – The Suburbs; 3rd: Beach House – Teen Dream; 4th: LCD Soundsystem – This Is Happening; 5th: Laura Marling – I Speak Because I Can
2011	PJ Harvey	Let England Shake	2nd: Metronomy – The English Riviera; 3rd: The Horrors – Skying; 4th: Wild Beasts – Smother; 5th: Kurt Vile – Smoke Ring for My Halo
2012	Tame Impala	Lonerism	2nd: Grimes – Visions; 3rd: Frank Ocean – Channel Orange; 4th: Crystal Castles – III; 5th: Alt-J – An Awesome Wave
2013	Arctic Monkeys	AM	2nd: Kanye West – Yeezus; 3rd: Queens of the Stone Age – ...Like Clockwork; 4th: Foals – Holy Fire; 5th: Savages – Silence Yourself
2014	St. Vincent	St. Vincent	2nd: Mac Demarco – Salad Days; 3rd: The War on Drugs – Lost in the Dream; 4th: Aphex Twin – Syro; 5th: Caribou – Our Love
2015	Grimes	Art Angels	2nd: Kendrick Lamar – To Pimp a Butterfly; 3rd: Jamie XX – In Colour; 4th: Wolf Alice – My Love Is Cool; 5th: Tame Impala – Currents
2016	The 1975	I Like It When You Sleep, for You Are So Beautiful yet So Unaware of It	2nd: Kanye West – The Life of Pablo; 3rd: Christine and the Queens – Chaleur Humaine; 4th: Skepta – Konnichiwa; 5th: Kaytranada – 99.9%
2017	Lorde	Melodrama	2nd: Wolf Alice – Visions of a Life; 3rd: Kendrick Lamar – Damn; 4th: Father John Misty – Pure Comedy; 5th: LCD Soundsystem – American Dream
2018	The 1975	A Brief Inquiry Into Online Relationships	2nd: Arctic Monkeys – Tranquility Base Hotel & Casino; 3rd: IDLES – Joy as an Act of Resistance; 4th: Sunflower Bean – Twentytwo in Blue; 5th: Pusha T – Daytona
2019	Billie Eilish	When We All Fall Asleep, Where Do We Go	2nd: Tyler, the Creator – Igor; 3rd: Lana Del Rey – Norman Fucking Rockwell!; 4th: Slowthai – Nothing Great About Britain; 5th: Little Simz – Grey Area
2020	Run the Jewels	RTJ4	2nd: Taylor Swift – folklore; 3rd: Dua Lipa – Future Nostalgia; 4th: The Strokes – The New Abnormal; 5th: Phoebe Bridgers – Punisher
2021	Sam Fender	Seventeen Going Under	2nd: Little Simz – Sometimes I Might Be Introvert; 3rd: Wolf Alice – Blue Weekend; 4th: Self Esteem – Prioritise Pleasure; 5th: Tyler, the Creator – Call Me If You Get Lost
2022	Arctic Monkeys	The Car	2nd: Wet Leg – Wet Leg; 3rd: Beyoncé – Renaissance; 4th: Fontaines D.C. – Skinty Fia; 5th: Kendrick Lamar – Mr. Morale & the Big Steppers
2023	Boygenius	The Record	2nd: Olivia Rodrigo – Guts; 3rd: Young Fathers – Heavy Heavy; 4th: Troye Sivan – Something to Give Each Other; 5th: Paramore – This Is Why
2024	Charli XCX	Brat	2nd: Fontaines D.C. – Romance; 3rd: English Teacher – This Could Be Texas; 4th: Nia Archives – Silence Is Loud; 5th: Magdalena Bay – Imaginal Disk
2025	Geese	Getting Killed	2nd: Addison Rae – Addison; 3rd: FKA Twigs – Eusexua; 4th: Nia Archives – Euro-Country; 5th: Bad Bunny – Debí Tirar Más Fotos

== See also ==
- NME Single of the Year
