= Guerrilla (album) =

Studio album by Super Furry Animals
- Released: 14 June 1999
- Recorded: Mid-1998
- Studio: Real World (Box, England)
- Genre: Alternative rock; indie rock; neo-psychedelia; indie electronic
- Length: 51:47
- Label: Creation
- Producer: Super Furry Animals

Super Furry Animals chronology
Out Spaced (1998)	Guerrilla (1999)	Mwng (2000)

Singles from Guerrilla
- 1. "Northern Lites" Released: 10 May 1999; 2. "Fire in My Heart" Released: 9 August 1999; 3. "Do or Die" Released: 17 January 2000

Guerrilla is the third studio album by Welsh rock band Super Furry Animals. The record was released on 14 June 1999 by Creation Records and peaked at number 10 in the UK Albums Chart. Guerrilla was conceived as a commercial 'pop' album and was produced by the band themselves, as regular producer Gorwel Owen felt exhausted after a busy schedule working for other bands. Recording took place at Real World Studios, Box, Wiltshire in mid-1998 with the group experimenting with a sampler for the first time and writing a number of songs in the studio. The band tried to create a 45-minute long, immediate sounding record, and therefore chose the upbeat songs from the 25 tracks which were recorded during sessions for the album. Guerrilla was chosen as the album's title as a pun on the group's name.

The album features a mix of musical styles and was described as exemplifying the 'nu-psychedelia' musical genre by British music magazine the NME. Singer Gruff Rhys has stated that his lyrics on the album, which address the growing impact of telecommunications, were optimistic and deliberately disposable. Critical reception was generally positive with the record appearing in the "Best album of 1999" lists issued by several magazines. It was subsequently ranked at number 311 on the NME's list of "The 500 Greatest Albums of All Time". It was the band's final album on Creation which folded the following year. The band were disappointed with the relative lack of success of the album's singles and went on "pop strike" as a result, issuing the 'lo-fi', all-Welsh language Mwng as the follow-up to Guerrilla in May 2000.

== Origins and recording ==
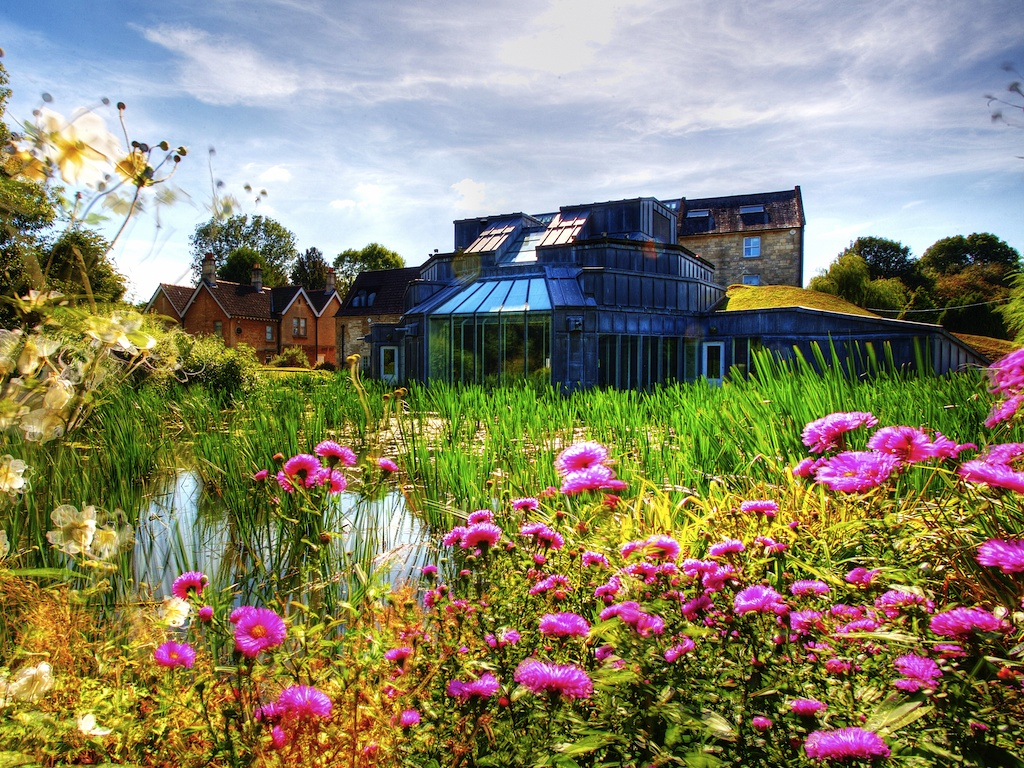
The sessions for Guerrilla took place at Real World Studios in Wiltshire.

Guerrilla was deliberately conceived as a commercial-sounding 'pop' album; a "jukebox sort of album, where you listen to it and every song is different," according to singer Gruff Rhys. Rhys has said that the band felt they were waging a "sonic war" against average music and "the mainstream" with the record.

The Super Furry Animals had originally intended to work on the album with Gorwel Owen, who co-produced 1996's Fuzzy Logic and 1997's Radiator with the band. According to Rhys, however, Owen felt "burned out" after producing other bands solidly for a year and a half and asked the group to wait until he had chance to rest. The Super Furry Animals were so keen to record that they decided to produce the album themselves. Guerrilla was recorded at Peter Gabriel's Real World Studios in Box, Wiltshire during the middle of 1998. Although Rhys has stated that the group met Gabriel several times during recording, and that they thought he was "a good old guy", Real World was chosen because it was near to the band's homes in Wales rather than because of its association with the former Genesis frontman. Sessions were "much less volatile than usual" according to Rhys, as the five members of the band felt they had to reach consensus over everything because they were producing the record themselves—while recording their previous albums the band would often fall out and shout at each other safe in the knowledge that Owen would act as a mediator and take the final decisions. Bassist Guto Pryce has stated that the band also felt happier during recording sessions for Guerrilla because they had their pets with them at Real World, and were able to relax and enjoy the 1998 FIFA World Cup and the British summer.

During recording, the band used a sampler for the first time and hired many different musical instruments. The group experimented with electronic sounds and wrote several of the album's tracks in the studio, allowing "the music to dictate itself". The song "Wherever I Lay My Phone (That's My Home)" was written around the ringtone of a mobile phone with the rhythm track being based on a sample of bassist Guto Pryce tripping over a lead while Huw Bunford played a note on his guitar. "Some Things Come from Nothing" came from an acid house tune written by keyboardist Cian Ciaran. Samples of Rhys playing an out-of-tune acoustic guitar and Ciaran playing drums were mixed together and the song was "written and recorded simultaneously" by the group. "The Sound of Life Today" is a 22-second sample of "Some Things Come From Nothing" played backwards – an accident that occurred when mixing engineer Chris Shaw rewound the mix and forgot to mute the tape machine. According to Rhys the band gave the track a "really pompous title" so that listeners would expect to hear the meaning of life and instead get just a "collection of noises". "Do or Die", "Fire in My Heart" and "Keep the Cosmic Trigger Happy" were written by Rhys while "The Door to This House Remains Open" developed from a band jam of the Rod Stewart song "Da Ya Think I'm Sexy?" which completely changed over the 30 minutes the group played for. The melody for "Northern Lites" was written by Gruff Rhys several years before the track was released. Reggae and rock styles were tried by the band before they settled on calypso after Rhys wrote lyrics for the song and tried playing along to a preset calypso rhythm track which was on his keyboard. The band added steel drums to the track on the spur of the moment after seeing the instruments "lying around" Real World during recording. The steel drums parts were performed by keyboard player Ciaran, despite the fact he did not know how to play them.

Around 25 tracks were recorded for Guerrilla, with all members of the band agreeing to trim this number down for the final track listing of the record in order to make a 45-minute-long album which was immediate. The group chose the 'up' songs, the "digital songs with more of a constant rhythm", that they had recorded and left off the 'down' tracks to create a positive "brash and light-weight" record—a "disposable pop album that's too good to throw away". According to Bunford, some of the more guitar-orientated songs the group recorded were included on initial track listings and were only left off the record at the last minute in favour of more electronic sounding tracks. Rhys has said that the decision to include "The Teacher" on the album was a decisive moment, as the track is "the most stupid thing on the record"—if a more downbeat song, such as eventual B-side "The Matter of Time", had been included in its place, Guerrilla would have been a much more self-indulgent album. The singer has also stated that the group's "healthy ego problems" would often result in individuals fighting to have some of their own songs removed from the final track listing of the record in favour of songs written by other members. The band chose to sequence the album like a hip hop record, with "Check It Out" as an introduction and "A Specific Ocean" and "The Sound of Life Today" as interludes.

The album's title is pun on the band's name but was also chosen by the group as they felt it had added resonance in the wake of the 1999 NATO bombing of Yugoslavia. Rhys has also stated that the band sometimes flatter themselves that they "take a guerrilla stance outside things, make things that aren't pop, popular in the future". The band added the subtitle "Non violent direct action" to the album's packaging to ensure that no-one could read any "crass, militaristic statements" into the name of the record. The band thought about making a film to accompany the album but ultimately decided that the idea was "too ambitious". They returned to this idea with 2001's Rings Around the World, making music videos for each of the tracks on the record and including them on the album's DVD release.

== Musical style ==
Super Furry Animals 'Check It Out' (1998)
Album opener "Check It Out" transitions from "jazz funk" to dub after its first minute, and has been described by the Melody Maker as the track which best sums up the "defacement of symmetry" present throughout Guerrilla.

Super Furry Animals "Night Vision" (1998)
"Night Vision" has been described as the "most aggressive-sounding" song on the album by singer Gruff Rhys. Critics have labelled the track punk and garage rock, with Yahoo! Music comparing the song to "She's Lost Control" by Joy Division.

Super Furry Animals "Some Things Come From Nothing" (1998)
Reviewers have called "Some Things Come From Nothing" a post-punk dub song, with the NME claiming that it is the nearest a rock band will get to the work of Aphex Twin.

Guerrilla features an eclectic mix of musical styles and has been described by Pitchfork as a combination of the group's techno roots and their more recent "sunny guitar-pop". The NME featured an interview with the Super Furry Animals, several weeks before the release of the album in the United Kingdom, as the lead article in an issue which discussed the "nu-psychedelia" musical genre, which they saw Guerrilla as exemplifying. Gruff Rhys has stated, however, that he sees the album as a quite conventional pop album, and that he associates psychedelia with improvisation whereas Guerrilla was "almost entirely preconceived". The singer has also said that the album is not a radical departure for the group musically, although it is "more groovy and uptempo [...] more textured and punchy" than the band's previous releases, partly due to the mix which creates a "more American sound". Spin stated that the record combines "prog, glam, techno, and garage" and is the "gleeful missing link in the psych-prog continuum". Select stated that the album juxtaposes pop songs with "rambling odities" and is dominated by the "electronic throbs and pulses" of keyboard player Cian Ciaran at the expense of guitarist Huw Bunford. The magazine went on to say that Gruff Rhys's voice anchors the record and gives life to songs which otherwise might seem to be works-in-progress, citing "Chewing Chewing Gum" as an example.

The Melody Maker has described opening track "Check It Out" as a "jazz funk" song which turns into dub after its first minute. The magazine went on to state that the song sums up the album due to its "defacement of symmetry" and disorder, which is also evident on "Do or Die", "The Turning Tide" and "The Teacher", all of which start as pop before ending up "skew-whiff under a wealth of hooligan noise". "The Turning Tide" features a string arrangement by High Llamas frontman Sean O'Hagan. According to Rhys the band were happy with O'Hagan's "interesting" arrangement—the track is more serious than many of the other songs on the album and the group found writing a string part for it themselves problematic. "Do or Die" has been described as a "dumb pop song" by Rhys and called "surf pop" by the Melody Maker. Rhys has called "Wherever I Lay My Phone (That's My Home)" "metronomical", and stated that it was inspired by mobile phone ringtones. Critics have described the song as a techno track, with Pitchfork calling it "floor-slapping LSD-infused electronica" and Spin stating that it is "a psycho ward of tweaked noises", reminiscent of the music of Daft Punk.

"The Door to This House Remains Open" is a drum and bass song that has been likened to the music of Boards of Canada by Yahoo! Music, while "Some Things Come From Nothing" is a post-punk dub track that was called "the closest a rock band will come to the cracked ambience of Aphex Twin" by the NME. "Fire in My Heart" has been described by Rhys as a country and western song, while Mojo has called it "trad-sounding" folk music. The Melody Maker called the album's closer "Keep the Cosmic Trigger Happy" "psych pop" and likened "Chewing Chewing Gum" to the second side of Roxy Music's debut album. "Night Vision" is the "most aggressive-sounding" song on the album according to Rhys. The track has been called garage rock by the Melody Maker and punk rock by both Allmusic and Yahoo! Music, with the latter comparing the song to "She's Lost Control" by Joy Division. First single "Northern Lites" is a calypso-inspired track. Critics have commented on the song's use of "Tijuana brass", reminiscent of the work of Herb Alpert, and likened the track to the music of Burt Bacharach and Hal David and the Beck single "Deadweight".

== Lyrical themes ==
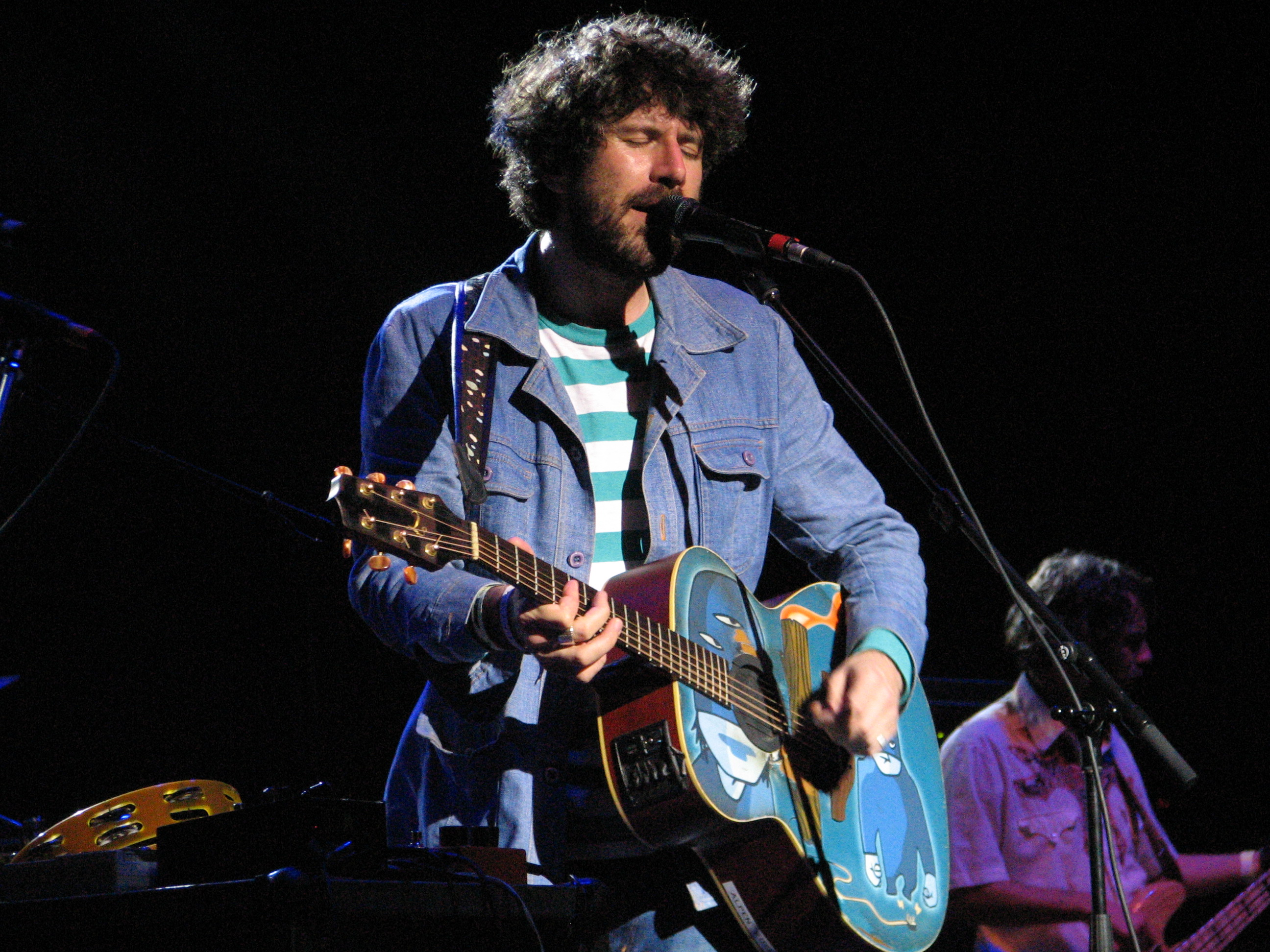
Singer Gruff Rhys has described Guerrilla's lyrics as "self-consciously disposable, happy"

According to Gruff Rhys, Guerrilla's lyrics are largely "self-consciously disposable, happy". "The Door to This House Remains Open" is about "starting a new chapter of your life". Rhys has said that his lyrics, which suggest that people should leave their doors open to others and that international borders should be open to allow immigration, are so optimistic that he is almost embarrassed by them. In contrast "Some Things Come From Nothing" features pessimistic lyrics inspired by the idea that "nothing seems to have any substance any more". "The Teacher" was written by Rhys from a teacher's perspective and was inspired by guitarist Huw Bunford, who was an art teacher before the Super Furry Animals became successful. Although Rhys has stated that "Fire in My Heart" features the most clichéd lyrics he has ever written, he has also said that he wrote it with complete sincerity. The track is "soul advice" and is about the many different people in our lives.

"Northern Lites" was named after the Aurora Borealis, a natural light display which can be observed particularly in the polar regions, and usually at night. The song's lyrics were written by Rhys about "the weather", and were inspired by coverage of the "terrifying, worldwide, seven-year phenomenon" of the west Pacific El Niño climate pattern the singer saw on "weather channels" in 1998. Rhys has said that he views "The Turning Tide" as more serious than the other tracks on Guerrilla. The song's lyrics are about living in a time of change and embracing change. Although "Do or Die" has "really daft lyrics" its title was taken from the Quit India speech made by Mahatma Gandhi on 8 August 1942 at the Gowalia Tank in Bombay in which Gandhi called for his countrymen to "Do or Die" and use non-violent resistance to end British Imperial rule in India. Rhys has stated that he feels quite pleased that young children can jump up and down to the song, singing "Gandhi lyrics". "Wherever I Lay My Phone (That's My Home)" is a comic, but also quite sinister, song about the possible effects of mobile phone radiation on people's health. Both "Night Vision" and "Keep the Cosmic Trigger Happy" have lyrics inspired by the band's nights out in Cardiff. The former addresses bouncers who caused problems for the group by throwing them out of nightclubs, and the aggression that the band frequently witnessed on Saturday nights in the city. The latter is a very happy song about "being in love and going out to the Hippo Club in Cardiff and feeling bulletproof and unstoppable".

== Release ==
Guerrilla was released on 14 June 1999 in the United Kingdom on CD, cassette, Minidisc and vinyl by Creation Records and peaked at number 10 in the UK Albums Chart. The record was released on 27 July 1999 in the United States. "Northern Lites" was released as the first single from the album, reaching number 11 in the UK Singles Chart, followed by "Fire in My Heart" which peaked at number 25 after its release on 9 August 1999. The third and final single to be taken from the album, "Do or Die", was released on 17 January 2000 and reached number 20 in the UK Singles Chart. Guerrilla was reissued in 2005 by XL Recordings, with a bonus CD featuring the six B-sides which appeared on the album's singles. The band had also planned on releasing "Wherever I Lay My Phone (That's My Home)" as a single, but this was ultimately dropped when Jimmy Cauty, formerly of The KLF, and Guy Pratt released the mobile telephone-themed novelty-pop record "I Wanna 1-2-1 With You" under the name Solid Gold Chartbusters which heavily samples the Nokia theme.

Pete Fowler, who had designed the sleeve of every Super Furry Animals release since the 1997 single "Hermann ♥'s Pauline", again provided the artwork for Guerrilla. In a departure from the illustrations he had provided for the Radiator campaign, Fowler worked in 3D, creating a model of a yellow creature inspired by Hindu deities dubbed the "God of Communications", smoking a pipe and wearing a "mobile phone and bandolier belt". The monster is shown operating "the control panel of the universe" for the cover of the record.

The album features the hidden tracks "Citizen's Band" and "Chewing Chewing Gum (Reprise)". The former appears only on the Compact Disc version of the record—it is stored in the pregap and can be heard by rewinding back from the start of the first song, "Check It Out". The latter appears at the very end of the album following several minutes of silence after the end of last song "Keep the Cosmic Trigger Happy". The lyrics for "Citizen's Band" are hidden inside the card outer-sleeve included with original CD copies of the album. According to Rhys the band decided to hide "Citizen's Band" as it didn't fit with the rest of the Guerrilla and they wanted to make the album like a computer game which can be played for several months before a new level is discovered. Guitarist Huw Bunford has stated that the band originally intended to hide the track in the album cover itself, by way of a special vinyl sleeve design, but the group's record label, Creation, refused to allow this due to the cost.

Region	Date	Label	Format	Catalogue
United Kingdom	14 June 1999	Creation Records	Compact disc	CRECD242
United Kingdom	14 June 1999	Creation Records	Cassette	CCRE242
United Kingdom	14 June 1999	Creation Records	Minidisc	CREMD242
United Kingdom	14 June 1999	Creation Records	Vinyl record	CRELP242
United States	27 July 1999	Flydaddy	Compact disc	FLY 036

== Critical reception ==
Professional ratings
Review scores
Source	Rating
AllMusic	4/5 stars
The Guardian	4/5 stars
The Independent	3/5 stars
Melody Maker	4.5/5 stars
NME	9/10
Pitchfork	9.5/10
Q	3/5 stars
The Rolling Stone Album Guide	2.5/5 stars
Select	4/5
Spin	8/10

Guerrilla received generally positive reviews from critics. Mojo called the album "magical stuff" and commended the band for their ability to mix musical styles, being particularly impressed with the juxtaposition of the esoteric "Wherever I Lay My Phone (That's My Home)" and the "trad-sounding" "Fire in My Heart". The magazine suggested that Guerrilla's melodies were good enough to provide the band with number one singles and praised "Northern Lites" in particular, stating that it was "one of the most frothily inventive pop confections" since the band's own "Ice Hockey Hair", released in 1998. Pitchfork were similarly impressed with the eclecticism of the album, stating that the group seemingly try every musical genre possible and succeed in their efforts. The website claimed that the album sees the band take their "long-standing whimsicality to its logic-warping extreme". Cokemachineglow also commented on the band's musical versatility, stating that, although the record features a mix of styles, it is a cohesive whole; a "perfectly flowing album", that showcases some of the Super Furry Animals' best songs. AllMusic agreed calling Guerrilla arguably the band's "most cohesive" album and a "pleasingly and consistently unpredictable" record. Yahoo! Music called Guerrilla a "strange bag of mixed fruits" and stated that, as the record is so difficult to pigeonhole, it "takes some getting into". The website felt that this was a good thing however, and again praised the album for its shifting musical styles. CMJ New Music Report stated that the record sees the band capturing "an enviously gentle interplay between electronic and organic instruments".

The NME called the album "an acid fried quadrophonic vision of rock 'n' roll" and suggested that it was a masterpiece which could define the era in which it was released, in the same way that Primal Scream's Screamadelica did in 1991 and (What's the Story) Morning Glory? by Oasis did in 1995. The magazine also stated that, despite the very different musical genres evident on the album, it succeeds in being a coherent, startlingly beautiful record, which showcases the band's "thunderous imagination and three-dimensional vision" and could be described as "experimental music with a beating heart". The NME ranked the album at number three in their Albums of the year 1999 feature, praising the record for its "superabundance of creativity". The Melody Maker also claimed that the album accurately reflected the era in which it was released and called it the group's best release. The magazine went on to compare Guerrilla to the "romance" of drug taking, calling it a "beautifully suggestive and inspiring testament" to illegal substances. Select placed Guerrilla at number nine in their albums of the year award for 1999 and called "Somethings Come From Nothing" the record's highlight, stating that the track "oozes an epic, sonourous electronic sadness around Gruff's muted mumbling of a single sentence". Despite dismissing "Wherever I Lay My Phone (That's My Home)" as a throwaway novelty song, the magazine stated that Guerrilla "makes experiment engaging" and concluded that it was a "brilliantly subversive" attack on the charts. The record appeared in the "Best New Albums of 1999" feature in the January 2000 issue of Record Collector, with the magazine calling it "upbeat and mischievous, with as many touching moments as there are puzzling".

Spin claimed that the album was "more-hit-than-miss" and shows that "prog can be fun". The magazine was critical of "The Turning Tide" and "Northern Lites" however, calling the former "cosmically ridiculous" and the latter "overipe fruit". British newspaper The Independent stated that, although the record includes a number of exceptional tracks, it also features a "lot of noodling" and claimed that it does not compare favourably with the work of The Flaming Lips. Q called Guerrilla a "great big bouncing ball of confusion" and stated that the record "explodes all over the place with almost cartoon glee". The magazine did, however, feel that the record's disparate influences were too often "left hanging like loose wires" and that there was an air of forced eccentricity about the release, despite praising lead single "Northern Lites".

Accolades

Publication	Country	Accolade	Rank	Year
Iguana Music	Spain	Best albums 1999	44	1999
Melody Maker	United Kingdom	Albums of the year 1999	3	1999
NME	United Kingdom	Albums of the year 1999	3	1999
Record Collector	United Kingdom	The Best New Albums of 1999	*	1999
Select	United Kingdom	Albums of the year 1999	9	1999
Uncut	United Kingdom	Albums of the year 1999	*	1999
The Village Voice	United States	Albums 1999	131	1999
NME	United Kingdom	"The 500 Greatest Albums of All Time".	311	2013

* denotes an unordered list

== Promotion and legacy ==
Super Furry Animals embarked on a brief, five-date, tour of the United Kingdom, in support of first single "Northern Lites", beginning at Tenby De Valance Pavilion on 27 April 1999 and ending at the Cambridge Corn Exchange on 2 May. The group then played that year's Glastonbury and V festivals. The band undertook a tour of the United States and Canada, beginning at Maxwell's, Hoboken, New Jersey on 14 September and ending at the Coachella Festival on 9 October. Singer Gruff Rhys wrote a tour diary, covering the first nine dates from 14–26 September, which appeared in the 9 October 1999 issue of the Melody Maker under the title "Guerrillas in the Midwest". The group played a fifteen date tour of the United Kingdom, starting on 15 October at the Royal Court Theatre, Liverpool and ending at the Brixton Academy, London on 3 November. After concerts in Scandinavia, Germany, the Netherlands and France, promotion ended with a headline date at the Cardiff International Arena on 20 December which was webcast on the band's official website, and a support slot with the Manic Street Preachers at the Millennium Stadium, Cardiff on New Year's Eve 1999.

Singer Gruff Rhys has described Guerrilla as "flippant, exciting, with an instant pop rush" and "one of [the band's] most ambitious" records, going on to state that "if any of our records could've sold a lot, this is the one. I don't think the others have been proper pop albums, but I think Guerrilla could have been". The band were disappointed with the relative lack of success of the album and its singles—none of which managed to chart inside the Top Ten of the UK Singles Chart—and went on "pop strike" as a result. Because of this the group's next record was the all-Welsh language, lo-fi, Mwng, which the group recorded simply for the joy of making music. The album was recorded in two weeks for just £6,000, in contrast with the "excessive expense" of Guerrilla.

== Track listing ==
All tracks are written by Super Furry Animals.

Disc 1: 2019 Remaster
No.	Title	Length
0.	"Citizen's Band" (hidden in the pregap)	4:43
1.	"Check It Out" (intro)	1:27
2.	"Do or Die"	1:59
3.	"The Turning Tide"	2:50
4.	"Northern Lites"	3:30
5.	"Night Vision"	4:41
6.	"Wherever I Lay My Phone (That's My Home)"	5:25
7.	"A Specific Ocean" (instrumental)	0:52
8.	"Some Things Come from Nothing"	5:54
9.	"The Door To This House Remains Open"	4:17
10.	"The Teacher"	2:31
11.	"Fire in My Heart"	2:46
12.	"The Sound of Life Today" (instrumental)	0:22
13.	"Chewing Chewing Gum"	4:49
14.	"Keep the Cosmic Trigger Happy" (includes hidden track "Chewing Chewing Gum (reprise)")	8:49

Disc 2: B-Sides & Such
No.	Title	Length
1.	"Rabid Dog"	3:46
2.	"The Matter of Time"	5:47
3.	"Mrs. Spector"	3:02
4.	"Missunderstanding (sic)"	3:22
5.	"Colorblind"	3:34
6.	"This, That and the Other"	5:53

== Personnel ==
Adapted from the liner notes.

=== Super Furry Animals ===
- Gruff Rhys – lead vocals, rhythm guitar, keyboards
- Huw Bunford – lead guitar, backing vocals, samplers
- Guto Pryce – bass guitar
- Cian Ciaran – keyboards, electronics, steel drums, drums, guitar, backing vocals, co-lead vocals on "Chewing Chewing Gum"
- Dafydd Ieuan – drums, percussion, backing vocals

=== Additional musicians ===
- Marcus Holdaway – cello on "The Turning Tide"
- Katie Wilkinson – viola on "The Turning Tide"
- Jaqueline Norrie – violin on "The Turning Tide"
- Julia Singleton – violin on "The Turning Tide"
- Steve Waterman – trumpet on "Northern Lites"
- A D Gibson – trumpet on "Northern Lites"
- Andrew Robinson – trombone on "Northern Lites"
- Euros Wyn – flute on "Northern Lites"
- Kris Jenkins – percussion on "Northern Lites"

=== Production ===
- Super Furry Animals – production, mixing
- Michael Brennan Jnr. – engineering, assistant mixing (Rockfield Studios), mixing on "Check It Out"
- Nick Addison – engineering
- Claire Lewis – assistant engineering
- Chris Shaw – mixing
- Patrick McGovern – assistant mixing (Strongroom Studios)
- Jon Collyer – assistant mixing (Orinoco Studios)
- Ray Mascarenes – assistant mixing (Orinoco Studios)
- Paul Reed – assistant mixing (Rockfield Studios)
- Ceri Collier – technical help
- Howie Weinberg – mastering

=== Artwork ===
- Pete Fowler – sleeve models and paintings
- Artificial Environments – other imagery and graphics
- Simon Corkin – design
- Matthew Donaldson – model photography

== Charts ==
Chart	Peak position
UK Albums Chart	10
