= NME Single of the Year =

Annual listing compiled by NME

Every December, British music magazine NME compiles a list of what it considers the best singles or tracks of the year. It was started in 1975. The list is usually published in one of the issues sold before Christmas – in 2006 it was published in the issue for 9 December. The companion list is NME album of the year

The NME Single of the Year list is compiled by the music reviewers and independent journalists who work for the magazine and for NME.com. Each picks his or her top 20 singles of the year and hands them in to the editor. An album marked at Number One gets 20 points, Number Two gets 19 points and so on until the 20th, which gets one point. All of the points from the various top 20s are then gathered together and the overall favourites are worked out and ranked for publication in the official list. The single or track with the most points overall is Number One in the list, the one with the second most points is Number Two and so on. There have been, to date, four artists who have won Album and Single of the Year in the same year: Joy Division in 1980, Klaxons in 2007, MGMT in 2008 and Lorde in 2017. Cecil Womack and Bobby Womack also won Single & Album of the Year respectively in 1984.

== Singles of the Year ==
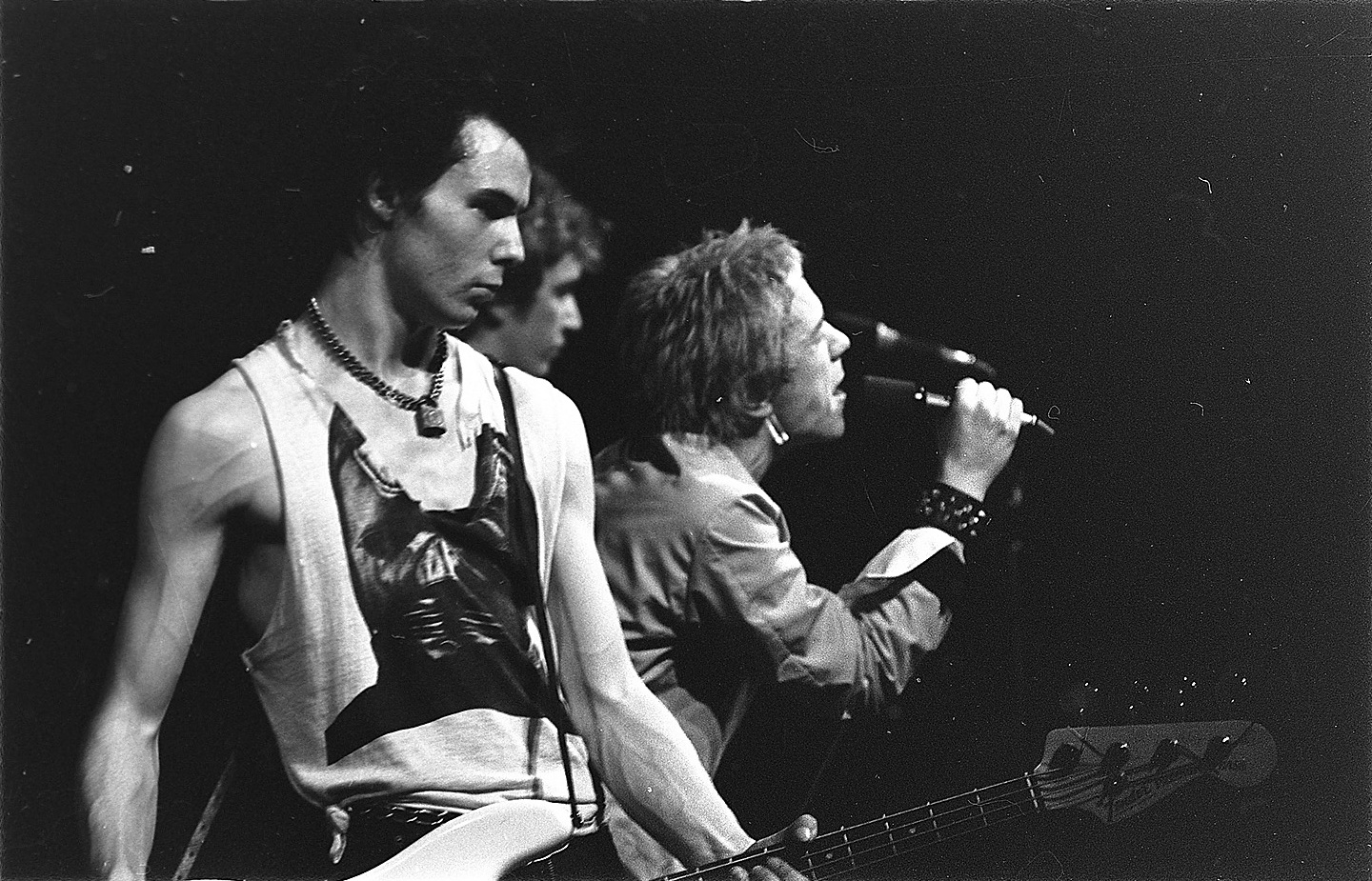
"Pretty Vacant" by the Sex Pistols topped the listing in 1977.

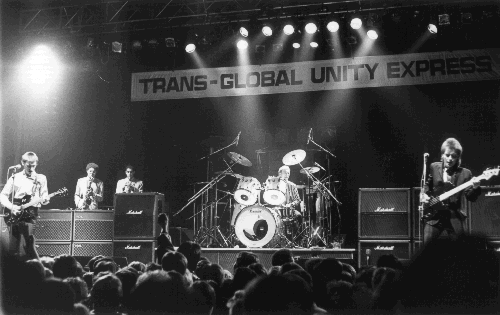
NME named "Eton Rifles" by The Jam as the best single of 1979.

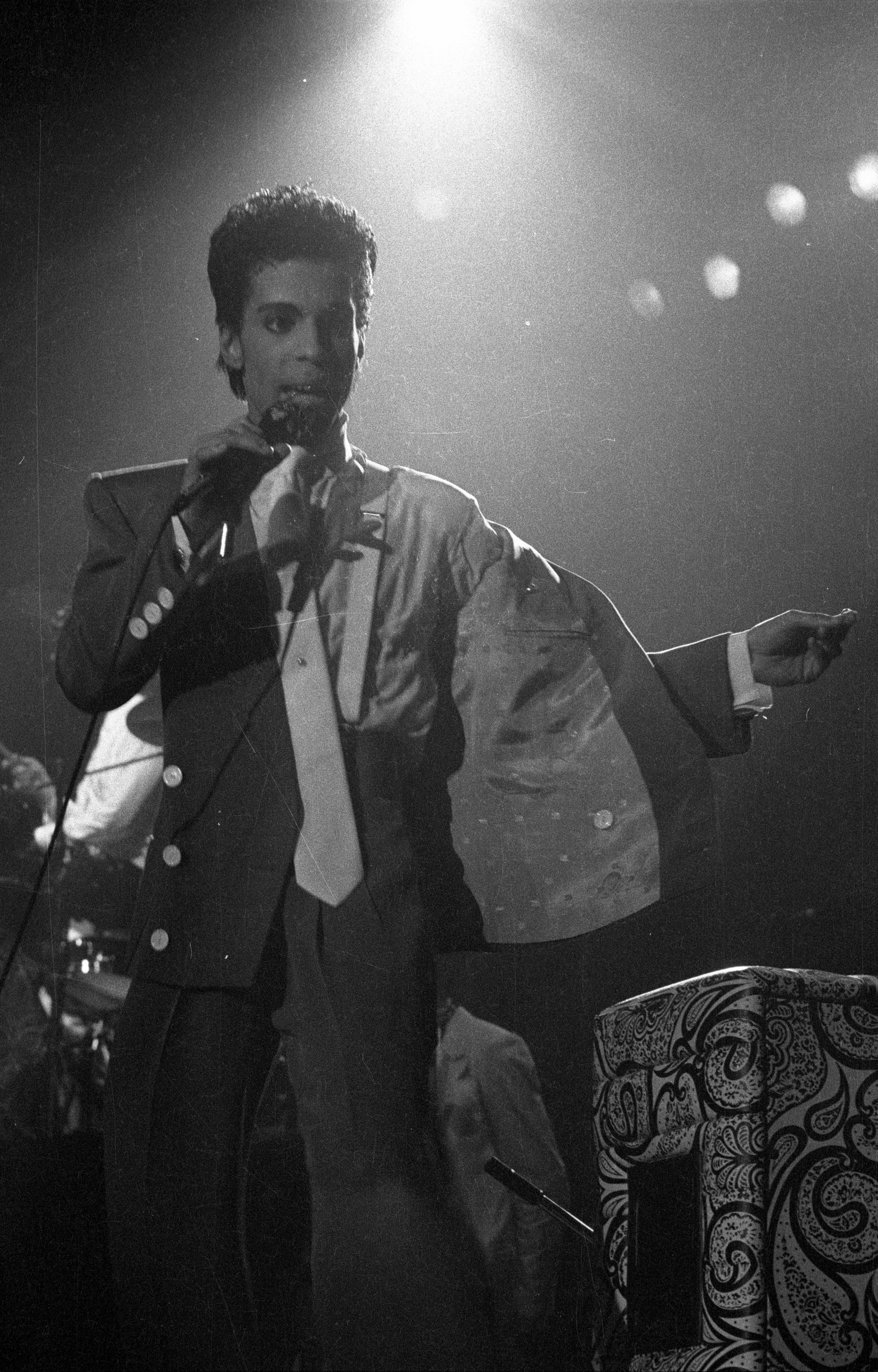
Prince was the only artist to top the list more than once, until 2022.

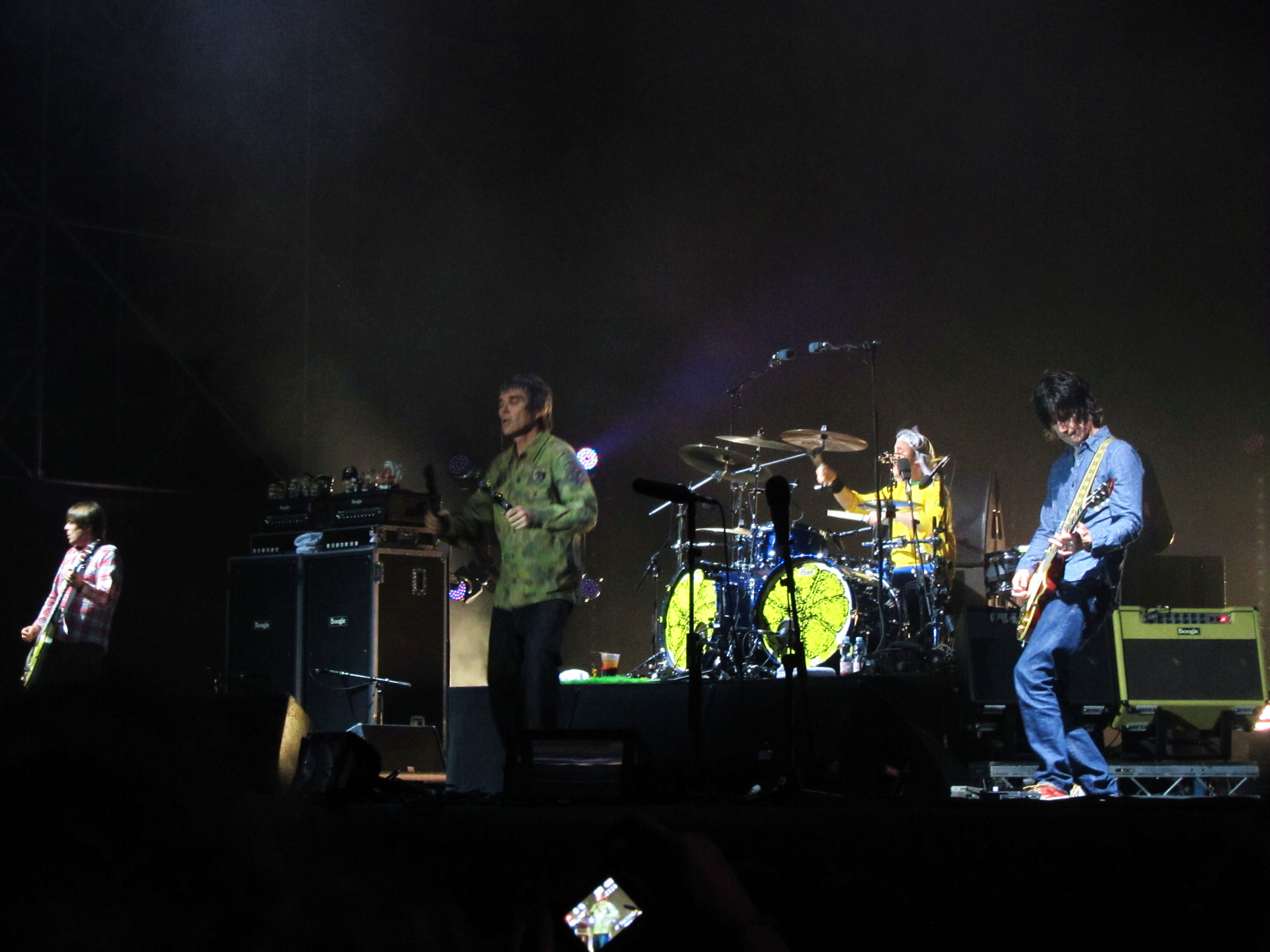
The Stone Roses' "She Bangs the Drum" was named the single of the year in 1989.

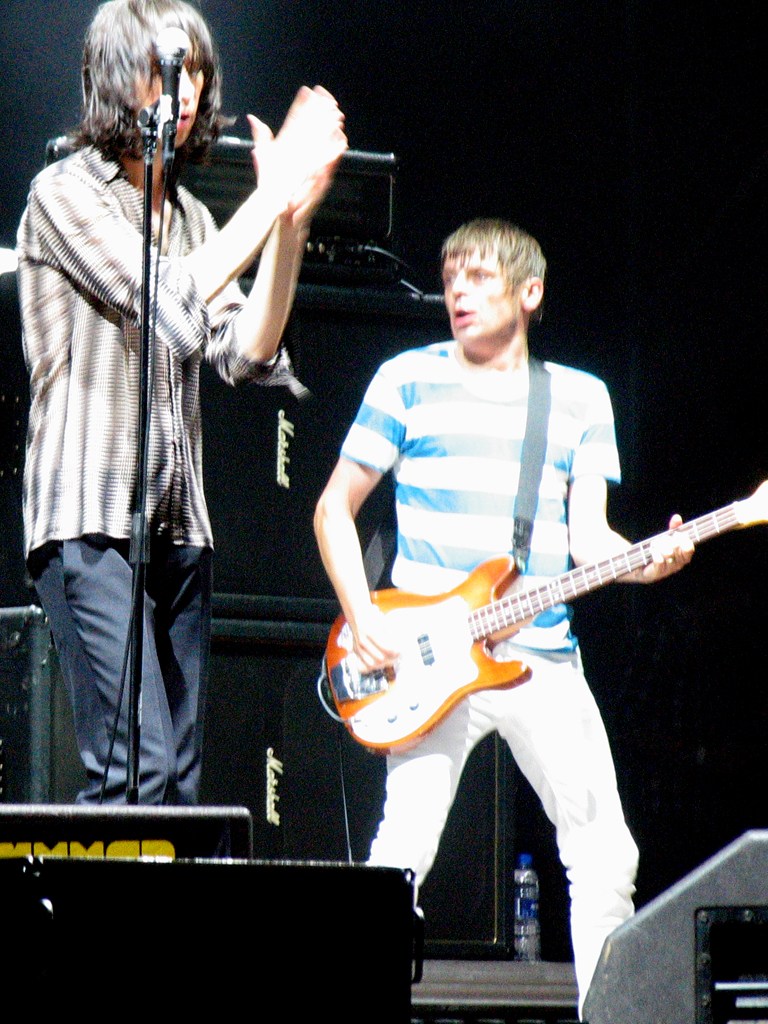
"Higher than the Sun" by Primal Scream was voted the greatest single of 1991.

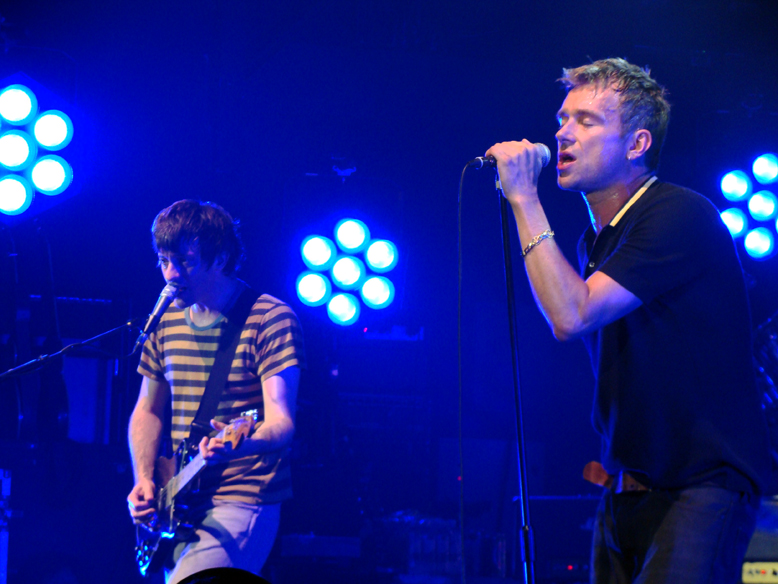
NME voted "Girls & Boys" by Blur as the number-one song of 1994.

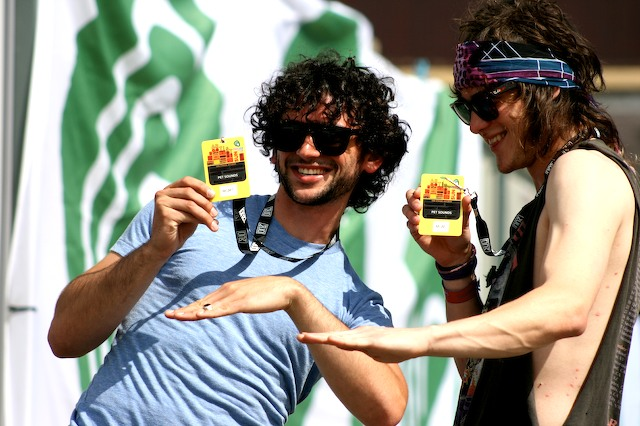
MGMT had three songs in NME's top five singles of 2008.

Year	Artist	Single	Top five
1975	Bob Marley & the Wailers	"No Woman No Cry"	2nd: 10cc – "I'm Not in Love"; 3rd: Shirley & Company – "Shame Shame Shame"; 4th: Queen – "Bohemian Rhapsody"; 5th: Amazing Rhythm Aces – "Third Rate Romance"
1976	Thin Lizzy	"The Boys Are Back in Town"	2nd: Eddie & the Hot Rods – Live at the Marquee; 3rd: Sex Pistols – "Anarchy in the UK"; 4th: Blue Öyster Cult – "Don't Fear the Reaper"; 5th: Nick Lowe – "So It Goes"
1977	Sex Pistols	"Pretty Vacant"	2nd: Elvis Costello – "Watching the Detectives"; 3rd: Ian Dury – "Sex & Drugs & Rock & Roll"; 4th: Sex Pistols – "God Save the Queen"; 5th: The Ramones – "Sheena Is a Punk Rocker"
1978	Buzzcocks	"Ever Fallen in Love (With Someone You Shouldn't've)"	2nd: Public Image Ltd – "Public Image"; 3rd: Ian Dury – "What a Waste"; 4th: The Rolling Stones – "Miss You"; 5th: Elvis Costello – "Radio Radio"
1979	The Jam	"Eton Rifles"	2nd: The Specials – "Gangsters"; 3rd: The Clash – "London Calling"; 4th: Gloria Gaynor – "I Will Survive"; 5th: The Jam – "Strange Town"
1980	Joy Division	"Love Will Tear Us Apart"	2nd: The Jam – "Going Underground"; 3rd: The Beat – "Mirror in the Bathroom"; 4th: Joy Division – "Atmosphere"; 5th: David Bowie – "Ashes to Ashes"
1981	The Specials	"Ghost Town"	2nd: Grandmaster Flash – "The Adventures of Grandmaster Flash on the Wheels of Steel"; 3rd: Coati Mundi – "Me No Pop I"; 4th: Heaven 17 – "Fascist Groove Thang"; 5th: The Human League – "Love Action"
1982	Grandmaster Flash	"The Message"	2nd: Marvin Gaye – "Sexual Healing"; 3rd: Robert Wyatt – "Shipbuilding"; 4th: The Jam – "Town Called Malice"; 5th: ABC – "The Look of Love"
1983	Michael Jackson	"Billie Jean"	2nd: James Brown – "Bring It On, Bring It On"; 3rd: The Imposter – "Pills and Soap"; 4th: The Birthday Party – The Bad Seed; 5th: New Order – "Blue Monday"
1984	Womack and Womack	"Love Wars"	2nd: Elvis Costello – "I Wanna Be Loved"; 3rd: The Special AKA – "Free Nelson Mandela"; 4th: Dennis Edwards – "Don't Look Any Further"; 5th: Staple Singers – "Slippery People"
1985	The Jesus & Mary Chain	"Never Understand"	2nd: The Jesus & Mary Chain – "Just Like Honey"; 3rd: Kate Bush – "Running Up That Hill"; 4th: The Smiths – "How Soon Is Now?; 5th: Nick Cave – "Tupelo"
1986	Prince	"Kiss"	2nd: Cameo – "Word Up"; 3rd: Ciccone Youth – "Into the Groove(y)"; 4th: Run D.M.C. – "Walk This Way"; 5th: The Real Roxanne – "Bang Zoom (Let's Go-Go)"
1987	Prince	"Sign o' the Times"	2nd: Eric B & Rakim – "Paid in Full"; 3rd: That Petrol Emotion – "Big Decision"; 4th: Public Enemy – "Rebel Without a Pause"; 5th: M/A/R/R/S – "Pump Up the Volume"
1988	Nick Cave	"The Mercy Seat"	2nd: Morrissey – "Every Day Is Like Sunday"; 3rd: Prince – "Alphabet Street"; 4th: Morrissey – "Suedehead"; 5th: The House of Love – "Destroy the Heart"
1989	The Stone Roses	"She Bangs the Drums"	2nd: The Stone Roses – "Fools Gold"; 3rd: The Sundays – "Can't Be Sure"; 4th: The Stone Roses – "Made of Stone"; 5th: 808 State – "Pacific State"
1990	Deee-Lite	"Groove Is in the Heart"	2nd: Happy Mondays – "Step On"; 3rd: Sinéad O'Connor – "Nothing Compares 2 U"; 4th: Betty Boo – "Where Are You Baby"; 5th: Primal Scream – "Loaded"
1991	Primal Scream	"Higher than the Sun"	2nd: The KLF – "Justified & Ancient"; 3rd: R.E.M. – "Losing My Religion"; 4th: Teenage Fanclub – "Star Sign"; 5th: Teenage Fanclub – "The Concept"
1992	Suede	"The Drowners"	2nd: PJ Harvey – "Sheela-Na-Gig"; 3rd: Manic Street Preachers – "Motorcycle Emptiness"; 4th: Radiohead – "Creep"; 5th: R.E.M. – "Drive"
1993	The Breeders	"Cannonball"	2nd: Credit to the Nation – "Call It What You Want"; 3rd: Leftfield – "Open Up"; 4th: Suede – "Animal Nitrate"; 5th: Rage Against the Machine – "Killing in the Name"
1994	Blur	"Girls & Boys"	2nd: Oasis – "Cigarettes & Alcohol"; 3rd: Oasis – "Live Forever"; 4th: Elastica – "Connection"; 5th: Sabres of Paradise – "The Theme"
1995	Black Grape	"Reverend Black Grape"	2nd: Supergrass – "Alright"; 3rd: Pulp – "Sorted for E's & Wizz"; 4th: Oasis – "Some Might Say"; 5th: Foo Fighters – "This Is a Call"
1996	Underworld	"Born Slippy"	2nd: Manic Street Preachers – "A Design for Life"; 3rd: Beck – "Where It's At"; 4th: The Prodigy – "Firestarter"; 5th: Orbital – "The Box"
1997	The Verve	"Bitter Sweet Symphony"	2nd: Blur – "Song 2"; 3rd: The Verve – "The Drugs Don't Work"; 4th: Embrace – "All You Good Good People"; 5th: Primal Scream – "Kowalski"
1998	Beastie Boys	"Intergalactic"	2nd: Super Furry Animals – Ice Hockey Hair; 3rd: Stardust – "Music Sounds Better with You"; 4th: Mercury Rev – "Goddess on a Hiway"; 5th: Manic Street Preachers – "If You Tolerate This Your Children Will Be Next"
1999	Aphex Twin	"Windowlicker"	2nd: TLC – "No Scrubs"; 3rd: Super Furry Animals – "Northern Lites"; 4th: The Flaming Lips – "Race for the Prize"; 5th: Eminem – "My Name Is"
2000	Eminem	"The Real Slim Shady"	2nd: Coldplay – "Yellow"; 3rd: Kelis – "Caught Out There"; 4th: Queens of the Stone Age – "The Lost Art of Keeping a Secret"; 5th: Lambchop – "Up with People"
2001	Missy Elliott	"Get Ur Freak On"	2nd: Kylie Minogue – "Can't Get You Out of My Head"; 3rd: The Strokes – The Modern Age; 4th: Andrew W.K. – "Party Hard"; 5th: The White Stripes – "Hotel Yorba"
2002	Doves	"There Goes the Fear"	2nd: Yeah Yeah Yeahs – Yeah Yeah Yeahs; 3rd: The Hives – "Hate to Say I Told You So"; 4th: The Coral – "Dreaming of You"; 5th: Queens of the Stone Age – "No One Knows"
2003	Beyoncé	"Crazy in Love"	2nd: The White Stripes – "Seven Nation Army"; 3rd: Outkast – "Hey Ya!"; 4th: The Libertines – "Don't Look Back into the Sun"; 5th: Franz Ferdinand – "Darts of Pleasure"
2004	The Libertines	"Can't Stand Me Now"	2nd: Franz Ferdinand – "Take Me Out"; 3rd: The Streets – "Dry Your Eyes"; 4th: Jay-Z – "99 Problems"; 5th: The Killers – "Mr Brightside"
2005	The Futureheads	"Hounds of Love"	2nd: Arcade Fire – "Rebellion (Lies)"; 3rd: Arctic Monkeys – "I Bet You Look Good on the Dancefloor"; 4th: Kanye West – "Gold Digger"; 5th: The White Stripes – "My Doorbell"
2006	Hot Chip	"Over and Over"	2nd: Peter Bjorn and John – "Young Folks"; 3rd: The Gossip – "Standing in the Way of Control"; 4th: Muse – "Supermassive Black Hole"; 5th: Gnarls Barkley – "Crazy"
2007	Klaxons	"Golden Skans"	2nd: Glasvegas – "Daddy's Gone"; 3rd: The Cribs – "Men's Needs"; 4th: The Teenagers – "Homecoming"; 5th: Rihanna – "Umbrella"
2008	MGMT	"Kids"	2nd: Glasvegas – "Geraldine"; 3rd: Mystery Jets – "Two Doors Down"; 4th: MGMT – "Time to Pretend"; 5th: MGMT – "Electric Feel"
2009	Yeah Yeah Yeahs	"Zero"	2nd: The Horrors – "Sea Within a Sea"; 3rd: The Big Pink – "Dominos"; 4th: Dizzee Rascal – "Bonkers"; 5th: Animal Collective – "My Girls"
2010	Foals	"Spanish Sahara"	2nd: M.I.A. – "XXXO"; 3rd: Janelle Monáe – "Tightrope"; 4th: Kanye West – "Power"; 5th: Arcade Fire – "We Used to Wait"
2011	Lana Del Rey	"Video Games"	2nd: Tyler, the Creator – "Yonkers"; 3rd: The Horrors – "Still Life"; 4th: PJ Harvey – "The Words That Maketh Murder"; 5th: Wild Beasts – "Bed of Nails"
2012	Palma Violets	"Best of Friends"	2nd: M.I.A. – "Bad Girls"; 3rd: Blur – "Under the Westway"; 4th: Haim – "Forever"; 5th: Plan B – "Ill Manors"
2013	Daft Punk	"Get Lucky"	2nd: Arcade Fire – "Reflektor"; 3rd: Arctic Monkeys – "Do I Wanna Know?"; 4th: Disclosure – "White Noise"; 5th: Yeah Yeah Yeahs – "Sacrilege"
2014	Future Islands	"Seasons (Waiting on You)"	2nd: Caribou – "Can't Do Without You"; 3rd: Fat White Family – "Touch the Leather"; 4th: The War on Drugs – "Red Eyes"; 5th: Run the Jewels – "Blockbuster Night, Pt. 1"
2015	Skepta	"Shutdown"	2nd: The Weeknd – "Can't Feel My Face"; 3rd: Justin Bieber – "What Do You Mean"; 4th: Foals – "What Went Down"; 5th: The 1975 – "Love Me"
2016	Rihanna	"Work"	2nd: The 1975 – "Somebody Else"; 3rd: Chance the Rapper – "All Night"; 4th: Iggy Pop – "Gardenia"; 5th: Christine & the Queens – "Tilted"
2017	Lorde	"Green Light"	2nd: Charli XCX - "Boys"; 3rd: Paramore - "Hard Times"; 4th: Kendrick Lamar - "Humble"; 5th: Stormzy - "Big For Your Boots"
2018	Ariana Grande	"No Tears Left to Cry"	2nd: The 1975 - "Love It If We Made It"; 3rd: Parquet Courts - "Wide Awake!"; 4th: Arctic Monkeys - "Four Out of Five"; 5th: Childish Gambino - "This Is America"
2019	Mura Masa featuring Slowthai	"Deal Wiv It"	2nd: Billie Eilish – "Bad Guy"; 3rd: Georgia – "About Work the Dancefloor"; 4th: Lil Nas X – "Old Town Road"; 5th: Fontaines D.C. – "Big"
2020	Cardi B featuring Megan Thee Stallion	"WAP"	2nd: Dua Lipa – "Physical"; 3rd: IDLES – "Grounds"; 4th: Arlo Parks – "Black Dog"; 5th: Romy – "Lifetime"
2021	Olivia Rodrigo	"Good 4 U"	2nd: Self Esteem – "I Do This All The Time"; 3rd: Wet Leg – "Chaise Longue"; 4th: Sam Fender – "Seventeen Going Under"; 5th: Lil Nas X – "Montero (Call Me by Your Name)"
2022	Beyoncé	"Cuff It"	2nd: Paramore – "This Is Why"; 3rd: Harry Styles – "As It Was"; 4th: Eliza Rose & Interplanetary Criminal – "B.O.T.A. (Baddest of Them All)"; 5th: Arctic Monkeys – "There'd Better Be a Mirrorball"
2023	Lana Del Rey	"A&W"	2nd: NewJeans – "Super Shy"; 3rd: Kylie Minogue – "Padam Padam"; 4th: Olivia Rodrigo – "Vampire"; 5th: The Last Dinner Party – "Nothing Matters"
2024	Chappell Roan	"Good Luck, Babe!"	2nd: Kendrick Lamar – "Not Like Us"; 3rd: Fontaines D.C. – "Starburster"; 4th: Charli XCX & Lorde – "Girl, So Confusing featuring Lorde"; 5th: Jade – "Angel of My Dreams"
2025	PinkPantheress	"Illegal"	2nd: Geese – "Taxes"; 3rd: CMAT – "Take a Sexy Picture of Me"; 4th: Amaarae – "S.M.O."; 5th: Katseye – "Gnarly"

== See also ==
- NME Album of the Year
- NME Awards
