= Out Spaced =

Compilation album by Super Furry Animals
- Released: 1998
- Recorded: 1993–1998
- Genre: Indie rock Britpop; Psychedelic rock
- Label: Creation
- Producer: Gorwel Owen and Super Furry Animals

Super Furry Animals chronology
Ice Hockey Hair EP (1998)	Out Spaced (1998)	Guerrilla (1999)

Alternative cover
- Special edition rubber nipple cover

Professional ratings
Review scores
Source	Rating
Allmusic	4/5 stars
NME	(7/10)
Pitchfork Media	(8.0/10)

Out Spaced is a 1998 B-sides and early releases album by the Super Furry Animals. First editions of the album were in rubber case shaped like a nipple.

The first track is notable for containing a sweary sample and still being released as a single; BBC Radio's attempt at censoring the track resulted in the last minute or two of the song being almost one long silence. The last track, "Blerwytirhwng" (Welsh for "Where are You Between?") is also notable in that it contains a more than five-minute-long outro of looped sci-fi noises.

According to Gruff Rhys the band "had to painfully omit some songs to compile Out Spaced as an album in its own right".

== Track listing ==
All songs by Super Furry Animals.

1. "The Man Don't Give a Fuck"
  - Previously released on The Man Don't Give a Fuck single (1996)
2. "Dim Brys dim Chwys"
  - Previously released on the Ankst compilation album Triskedekaphilia (1995)
3. "Smokin'"
  - Previously released on the Ice Hockey Hair E.P. (1998)
4. "Dim Bendith"
  - Previously released on the God! Show Me Magic single (1996)
5. "Arnofio/Glô in the dark"
  - Previously released on the Something 4 the Weekend single (1996)
6. "Guacamole"
  - Previously released on the If You Don't Want Me to Destroy You single (1996)
7. "Don't Be a Fool Billy"
  - Previously released on the Hometown Unicorn single (1996)
8. "Focus Pocus/Debiel"
  - Previously released on the Moog Droog E.P. (1995)
9. "Fix Idris"
  - Previously released on the Llanfairpwllgwyngyllgogerychwyrndrobwllllantysiliogogogoch (In Space) E.P. (1995)
10. "Pam V"
  - Previously released on the Moog Droog E.P. (1995)
11. "Pass the Time"
  - Previously released on the Play It Cool single (1997)
12. "Carry the Can"
  - Previously released on the Demons single (1997)
13. "Blerwytirhwng"
  - Previously released on the Llanfairpwllgwyngyllgogerychwyrndrobwllllantysiliogogogoch (In Space) E.P. (1995)

The CD release contains an instrumental song which was known for many years as "Spaced Out" in the pregap before "The Man Don't Give a Fuck". This song was finally named as "Bulletproof" on the 2026 compilation album Precreation Percolation.
