= Precreation Percolation =

Compilation album by Super Furry Animals
- Released: 1 May 2026
- Studio: Ofn (Llanfaelog, Wales); Grassroots (Cardiff, Wales)
- Length: 28:11 (Vinyl); 78:54 (CD); 112:52 (digital)
- Language: English; Welsh
- Label: Strangetown
- Producer: Super Furry Animals

Super Furry Animals chronology
Zoom! The Best of 1995–2016 (2016)	Precreation Percolation (2026)

Singles from Precreation Percolation
- 1. "Pocket Sam" Released: 12 February 2026

Precreation Percolation is a compilation album by the Welsh rock band Super Furry Animals, released on 1 May 2026 via Strangetown Records. It contains material of the band before their signing to Creation Records in 1995, including their debut extended plays Llanfair... (In Space) (1995) and Moog Droog (1995) for Ankst Records in full, four songs recorded with original lead singer Rhys Ifans, and a variety of rarities, demos, and 2026 redux versions.

The album was preceded by the single "Pocket Sam"—one of the Ifans tracks—earlier that year, and upon release it peaked at no. 10 and no. 23 on the UK Independent and Scottish Albums Charts, respectively.

== Content ==
The albums consists entirely of material prior to the band's signing to Creation Records in the summer of 1995. It begins with the band's first extended plays for Welsh label Ankst: Llanfair... (In Space) (1995) and Moog Droog (1995). The CD version adds several bonus tracks, starting with "Don't Be a Fool, Billy", as seen on the 1995 Fierce Panda Records compilation EP Mortal Wombat. The four following tracks, "Choking on Your Lust", "Pocket Sam", "Of No Fixed Identity", and demo "AK Serenade" are sung by the band's original lead vocalist, Rhys Ifans, all recorded in 1993. Each Ifans-sung track had been previously unreleased, except for "Of No Fixed Identity", which was released in 2022 as a limited-time Bandcamp-exclusive song to provide benefit for the Severn Estuary. A re-worked version of the song appeared on the single "Hometown Unicorn" as "Lazy Life". Also included are "Dim Brys, Dim Chwys" (Welsh for "No Hurry, No Sweat"), originally aired on BBC Radio Cymru and released on the 1995 Anskt compilation Triskedekaphilia, and a 1993 demo of "The Man Don't Give a Fuck".

The digital version, in addition to the tracks from the CD, includes primarily instrumental demos. Several would be later fleshed out for their debut album Fuzzy Logic (1996), and "Something Came from Nothing" is an early version of "Some Things Come from Nothing" from Guerilla (1999).

== Single and release ==
The compilation was led with the Ifans-sung single "Pocket Sam" on 12 February 2026. Precreation Percolation was released the following 1 May via Strangetown Records, subsequently placing on the UK Independent and Scottish Albums Charts at no. 10 and no. 23, respectively. The vinyl consists of just the band's 1995 EPs for Ankst Records but is packaged with the 22-track CD version within a "slim card wallet".

== Critical reception ==
Professional ratings
Aggregate scores
Source	Rating
Metacritic	81/100
Review scores
Source	Rating
AllMusic	4/5 stars
Buzz	4/5 stars
Classic Pop	3.5/5 stars
Mojo	4/5 stars
Record Collector	3/5 stars
Shindig!	4/5 stars
Spectrum Culture	70%
Uncut	4/5 stars
Under the Radar	7/10

According to the review aggregator Metacritic, Precreation Percolation received "universal acclaim" based on a weighted average score of 81 out of 100 from six critic scores. Reviewing for AllMusic, Tim Sendra noted that while much of the Ankst EPs already appear on the compilation Out Spaced, they said that "it's nice to have them in their compete [sic] form", and that, together with its "treasure trove of rarities," the compilation is a "fascinating" view into the group's early years. Spectrum Culture's Holly Hazelwood thought that much of the compilation shows a time where the band's "wild, wandering spirit hadn’t quite gelled yet", though by Moog Droog, that had changed. They highlighted the trio of synthesizer instrumentals on the digital edition as some of the "more interesting" tracks on the record. In Uncut, despite the overall rating of eight out of ten, Sam Richards gave a separate rating of six out of ten for the digital bonus tracks, stating they "are largely for completists only". Other critics also argued that Precreation and Percolation's appeal lies mostly with devotees of the band, especially for the two Ankst EPs and the Ifans-led recordings.

Commenting on the Ifans tracks, Simon Price of The Quietus said that while he "lack[s] the warmth, depth and texture of Gruff [Rhys]", he would have nonetheless sufficed as "a decent indie rock frontman", given his specific delivery and good sense of pitch. Classic Pop's Jon O'Brien singled out "Pocket Sam" as the "hidden treasure" among the Ifans tracks, but thought that "AK Serenade" and "Choking on Your Lust" were too "unpolished" and "derivative", respectively. O'Brien used those two songs to argue that Gruff Rhys' later role in the group ultimately led to the better outcome. Will Steen of Buzz was also mixed in their assessment of the Ifans tracks, describing the Ifans period as "fascinating but doomed", but the compilation otherwise "satisfies with its slew of unreleased and early Super Furry Animals material".

== Track listing ==
All tracks are written by Super Furry Animals.

Vinyl track listing – Llanfair... (In Space) and Moog Droog
No.	Title	Length
1.	"Organ yn Dy Geg"	3:03
2.	"Fix Idris"	3:10
3.	"Crys Ti"	2:03
4.	"Blerwytirhwng?"	4:59
5.	"Pam V?"	4:01
6.	"God! Show Me Magic"	1:55
7.	"Sali Mali"	4:37
8.	"Focus Pocus / Debiel"	4:23
Total length:		28:11

CD bonus tracks
No.	Title	Length
9.	"Don't Be a Fool, Billy" (Mortal Wombat version)	4:12
10.	"Choking on Your Lust"	4:15
11.	"Pocket Sam"	2:53
12.	"Of No Fixed Identity"	4:14
13.	"AK Serenade" (4-track demo)	2:39
14.	"Bulletproof" (4-track demo)	4:24
15.	"Dim Brys, Dim Chwys"	5:33
16.	"Trk05b" (cassette demo)	5:54
17.	"The Man Don't Give a Fuck" (1993 demo)	2:00
18.	"AK Serenade" (2026 redux)	2:19
19.	"Bulletproof" (2026 redux)	4:10
20.	"Fine Time" (2026 redux)	3:00
21.	"Quest" (2026 redux)	2:25
22.	"Rise 'n' Shine" (2026 redux)	2:45
Total length:		78:54

Digital bonus tracks
No.	Title	Length
23.	"God! Show Me Magic" (demo – 2026 redux)	2:45
24.	"Frisbee" (demo – 2026 redux)	2:48
25.	"Don't Be a Fool, Billy" (demo – 2026 redux)	3:03
26.	"Hangin' with Howard Marks" (demo – 2026 redux)	4:46
27.	"Fuzzy Birds" (4-track demo)	2:45
28.	"Rise 'n' Shione" (4-track demo)	2:42
29.	"Something Came from Nothing" (cassette demo)	3:22
30.	"Trk05a" (cassette demo)	5:41
31.	"Tetrachromancy" (cassette demo)	6:35
Total length:		112:52

== Personnel ==
Credits for tracks 1 through 22 are adapted from the vinyl liner notes.

=== Super Furry Animals ===
- Huw Bunford – production
- Cian Ciarán – production, sketch at Gold Street, Cardiff (track 16), redux at Strangetown, Cardiff (17)
- Dafydd Ieuan – lead vocals (18, 19); production; recording and mixing at Column Road, Cardiff (13, 14); mixing at Strangetown, Cardiff (18–22)
- Guto Pryce – production
- Gruff Rhys – lead vocals (except 10–13, 18, 19), production

=== Additional personnel ===
- Rhys Ifans – lead vocals (10–13)
- Gorwel Owen – recording at Stiwdio Ofn, Llanfaelog (1–8, 10, 15, 17–22), mixing at Stiwdio Ofn, Llanfaelog (1–8, 10, 15)
- Paul Bowen – recording and mixing at Palace Road, Cardiff (9)
- Quinton Quammie – recording and mixing at Grassroots, Cardiff (11, 12)
- Donal Whelon – mastering at Hafod Mastering
- Jason Mitchell – vinyl cut at Loud Mastering
- Mark James Works – artwork
- Kliph Scurlock – SFA archive

== Charts ==
Chart performance for Precreation Percolation
Chart (2026)	Peak position
Scottish Albums (OCC)	23
UK Albums Sales (OCC)	20
UK Independent Albums (OCC)	10
