= Frances Lincoln =

British publisher (1945–2001)

- Born: Frances Elisabeth Rosemary Lincoln; 20 March 1945; London, England
- Died: 26 February 2001 (aged 55); Kendal, Cumbria, England
- Occupation: Book publisher
- Known for: Frances Lincoln Publishers; Woman of the Year for Services to Multicultural Publishing (1995)

Frances Elisabeth Rosemary Lincoln (20 March 1945 – 26 February 2001) was an English independent publisher of illustrated books. She published under her own name and the company went on to become Frances Lincoln Publishers. In 1995, Lincoln won the Woman of the Year for Services to Multicultural Publishing award.

== Education ==
Frances Lincoln went "unhappily" to school in Bedford, moving after a year to St George's School, Harpenden, where she became Head Girl. Her university education was at Somerville College, Oxford (Somerville at that time was a women's college, known in Oxford as "the bluestocking college"). There she read Greats (the Oxford term for traditional courses in the humanities, with emphasis on the ancient classics of Greece and Rome, including philosophy). A fellow-student, the drug smuggler Howard Marks, described her as "vivacious" in his 1996 autobiography Mr. Nice.

== Career ==
In 1970, Lincoln started work as an Assistant Editor at the London-based publishing firm of Studio Vista. She went on to become its managing director. From Studio Vista, she moved to a job with the publisher Marshall Cavendish, and from there to Weidenfeld and Nicolson, where she was given her own imprint.

A story that followed her throughout her career, often passed on from employees to new recruits, was of the staff-walkout and demonstration she headed while at Studio Vista in 1975. This was a protest against redundancies proposed by Collier Macmillan, the firm that had come to own Studio Vista. The protest went on for some days, and was described as a strike; it achieved concessions from Collier Macmillan.

== Frances Lincoln Publishers ==
In 1977, Frances went out on her own as an independent publisher/packager, publishing both under her own name and in co-editions. The firm she founded continued as Frances Lincoln Publishers, based in London, until 2018. In August 2011, The Quarto Group acquired Frances Lincoln Publishers for £4.5 million, making it the Frances Lincoln Children's Book imprint. The firm was known for the list of illustrated gardening books it published, and for its illustrated children's books. Among these were David Litchfield's The Bear and the Piano, which won the 2016 Waterstones Children's Book Prize for Illustrated Books, Sarah Garland's Azzi In Between, which won Little Rebels Book Award in 2013, and Lizzy Stewart's There's a Tiger in the Garden, which won the same prize in 2017.

== Family ==
Frances Lincoln married John Nicoll, the author of the first book she had commissioned. Nicoll later headed Yale University Press in the United Kingdom. The couple had a son and two daughters. Lincoln died from pneumonia aged 55 in 2001.
