= Mr Nice (book) =

1996 autobiography by Howard Marks

- First edition
- Author: Howard Marks
- Language: English
- Subject: Autobiography
- Genre: Non-fiction
- Publisher: Secker & Warburg
- Publication date: 1996
- Publication place: United Kingdom
- Media type: Print (hardback and paperback)
- Pages: 466 pp
- ISBN: 0-436-20305-7

Mr Nice is the autobiography of former drug dealer Howard Marks. Published in 1996, it became an international bestseller due in large part to the humour and unabashed bravado the author uses to describe his life and the sheer scale of his drug deals involving, among others, the CIA, MI6, the IRA and the Mafia. The book received mostly positive reviews, though some critics were initially sceptical of some of the more outlandish details portrayed. It was adapted for film in 2010 as Mr Nice.

== Overview ==
Welsh born Marks began small scale dealing of hashish in the late 1960s while at Oxford University studying nuclear physics and, later, a postgraduate degree course in philosophy.

His activities rapidly expanded after a chance meeting with a Pakistani supplier made him realise how lucrative drug smuggling could be. After teaming up with Jim McCann, a senior member of the IRA, his business was soon bringing in huge amounts of cash and he began setting up various legitimate businesses as a front, to launder the proceeds of his hashish smuggling. At one time he claims to have had 25 such companies, 89 phone lines and 43 aliases, including the name used for the title of this book, Mr Nice, an alias he adopted after buying a passport from a convicted murderer of that name.

Following his arrest in 1980 in a combined operation by British and Spanish police, Marks managed to avoid a lengthy sentence by claiming to be a spy for the British intelligence agency MI6. He was eventually caught again, this time by the American DEA, and sentenced to life in prison at Terre Haute federal penitentiary in Indiana. He was released after seven years and allowed to return to the UK.

== Film adaptation ==
The book was adapted into a film Mr Nice in 2010, directed by Bernard Rose and starring Rhys Ifans and Chloë Sevigny.
