= Paolo Hewitt =

British music journalist

- Born: 11 July 1958 (age 67); Redhill, England
- Occupations: Writer; music journalist
- Notable work: Steve Marriot: All Too Beautiful..., The Looked After Kid, The Jam: A Beat Concerto, But We All Shine On
- Website: paolohewitt.blogspot.co.uk

Paolo Hewitt (born 1958) is an English music journalist and writer from Woking in Surrey.

== Biography ==
Hewitt was placed in care at a very early age, and went to live with a foster family. Following years of abuse he was sent to Burbank children's home in Woking at the age of ten. He has written about this period of his life in But We All Shine On. As part of research for her 2006 novel Wicked! author Jilly Cooper read The Looked After Kid.

=== Early career and journalism ===
Hewitt's first published work was a biography of The Jam entitled The Jam: A Beat Concerto which was published following their split in 1983. He has written on various subjects for The Guardian.

== Books ==
=== Titles ===
Title	Date Published
Colour Me Father An Open Letter To My Son...	19 November 2019
Steve Marriott: All Too Beautiful...	3 December 2009
But We All Shine On	21 October 2014
The Looked After Kid	22 May 2003
The Jam: A Beat Concerto	16 September 1983
Paul Weller - The Changing Man	16 June 2008
David Bowie Album By Album	12 September 2013
The Greatest Footballer You Never Saw: The Robin Friday Story (Mainstream Sport)	14 September 1998
The Soul Stylists: Six Decades of Modernism - From Mods to Casuals	25 September 2003
Getting High: The Adventures of Oasis	1 January 1997
The Sharper Word: A Mod Anthology	7 May 2009
Heaven's Promise: A Novel	2 February 2015
A to Z of Mod	3 December 2009
Scuse Me While I Kiss the Sky: 50 Moments that Changed Music	29 September 2011
OASIS Forever The People	5 August 2000
