= Welsh Comedy Festival =

2007 comedy festival in Cardiff, Wales

The Welsh Comedy Festival was held in 2007. It was held in partnership with the Welsh hospice charity Tŷ Hafan.

It hosted a wide range of comedy performances and acts during the period 6–15 July 2007. The inaugural festival opened at Gio's and moved to locations such as The Point at Cardiff Bay, The Social (Cardiff) and the Cardiff University Student's Union and included a visit to Swansea's famous Grand Theatre during the festivities organised by local stand-up comic and promoter Jeff Baker of Cracker Ass Comedy fame.

Acts included Howard Marks, Dirty Sanchez, Rhod Gilbert, Wes Packer, Kevin Coleman, Tiff Stevenson, Lloyd Langford, and many others.

The BBC filmed events throughout the duration of the festival as part of their Funny Business series, screened in Autumn 2007. This series highlighted the burgeoning comic scene in Cardiff and also followed the ups and downs of hundreds of comedians all hoping to secure a £30,000 contract.
