= Mr Nice =

2010 film by Bernard Rose

- Directed by: Bernard Rose
- Screenplay by: Bernard Rose
- Based on: Mr Nice by Howard Marks
- Produced by: Luc Roeg
- Starring: Rhys Ifans; Chloë Sevigny; Omid Djalili; Crispin Glover; David Thewlis
- Cinematography: Bernard Rose
- Edited by: Teresa Font; Bernard Rose
- Music by: Philip Glass
- Production companies: Independent Film Productions; Kanzaman
- Distributed by: Contender Entertainment (UK)
- Release dates: 14 March 2010 (SXSW); 8 October 2010 (United Kingdom); 20 July 2012 (Spain)
- Running time: 121 minutes
- Countries: United Kingdom; Spain
- Language: English

Mr Nice (US title Mr. Nice) is a 2010 crime drama film written and directed by Bernard Rose, Mr Nice is in part a biopic, a loose film adaptation of Mr Nice, the cult 1997 autobiography by Howard Marks. The film features an ensemble cast starring Rhys Ifans as Howard Marks, along with David Thewlis, Omid Djalili, Jack Huston, Crispin Glover and Chloë Sevigny.

Ifans portrays Marks, a Welsh marijuana smuggler who ran one of the biggest global cannabis smuggling operations from the late 1960s to the early 1980s, mostly while on the run. Marks associated with some of the more colourful characters of the era, allegedly even cutting deals with the FBI, the Mafia, the IRA and MI6. After serving time in Terre Haute, one of the "toughest" prisons in the United States, Marks stopped smuggling and dealing in cannabis (although he still openly used the drug himself) and gained wider fame as a pro-cannabis campaigner, stand-up comedian, actor (at least in cameos), lads' mag columnist, television show panelist, music producer, motivational speaker, and even prospective Member of Parliament.

Like Marks's autobiography on which it is based, the film has polarised critics.

== Plot ==
The film begins in 2010, with 65-year-old Howard Marks going onto a stage in front of a packed theatre to great applause. Marks asks if there are any plainclothes policemen in the audience, to which the reply is negative. Then, while lighting up a joint, Marks asks, "Who here is a dope (marijuana) smoker?", to even greater applause. The film then diverts to Marks's internal monologue as he recounts his life.

Born in the Welsh valleys in 1945, young Howard Marks (Rhys Ifans), later nicknamed Mr Nice, excels academically beyond the national standard of the United Kingdom. This remarkable aptitude earns him a scholarship to Oxford University at age nineteen, where he reads philosophy and physics. But Marks's destiny changes one night while he is dutifully studying alone in his dorm. A beautiful, rebellious and hedonistic foreign exchange student from Latvia, Ilze Kadegis (Elsa Pataky), breaks into Marks's room, looking for a secret passageway within. Marks follows Kadegis through the secret passageway and into a forgotten storage space used by one of the school's top marijuana dealers, Graham Plinson (Jack Huston). Kadegis seduces Marks and introduces him to cannabis for the first time. For the next few years, Marks becomes an enthusiastic customer of Plinson's, and continues his love affairs with both Kadegis and cannabis. The group enjoy a series of wilder and wilder nights, with their academic lives suffering as a result.

Circumstances change for the worse when Plinson introduces the group to LSD. When rich heir Joshua Macmillan, a friend of Marks's, dies of an overdose and Marks impales his foot on a spike, Marks vows to never touch drugs again - or at least the harder variety of drugs. The trio of Marks, Kadegis and Plinson promise each other to turn over a new leaf, and they pass their scholarships through some intense last-minute revision and a little cheating. They then all move on to teacher training courses at the University of London in 1967, where Marks hastily marries Kadegis. Fractures begin appearing early in their marriage, with Marks becoming despondent, apathetic and suspecting Kadegis of having an affair. Marks also gets into trouble at the university for "having long hair and flashy suits".

When plans to bring a large cache of hashish into England via Germany go wrong and Plinson is arrested, Marks steps in to help, figuring that he has nothing left to lose anyway. Marks goes to Germany and drives a car holding the stash of drugs across the borders himself, simply driving through customs. The customs officers are on the lookout for Plinson's crew, but do not know Marks, who sails through without incident. Marks says that the thrill of getting away with it was like a "religious flash and an asexual orgasm". After Marks sells the hashish back in London to an Arab oil sheik named Saleem Malik (Omid Djalili), he makes a fortune and swiftly becomes addicted to this new but dangerous lifestyle as a big league marijuana trafficker, eventually running a large percentage of the world's cannabis trade.

== Cast ==
- Rhys Ifans as Howard Marks
- Chloë Sevigny as Judy Marks
- Jack Huston as Graham Plinson
- Crispin Glover as Ernie Combs
- David Thewlis as James 'Jim' McCann
- Omid Djalili as Saleem Malik
- Elsa Pataky as Ilze Kadegis
- Andrew Tiernan as Alan Marcuson
- Jamie Harris as Patrick Lane
- Christian McKay as Hamilton McMillan
- Ken Russell as Russell Miegs

== Production ==
Following the success of Marks's 1997 autobiography Mr Nice, which became a best-seller (ranked #1 book regarding drugs on Amazon), Marks began to make a name for himself in a number of different media, and a film adaptation of the book was petitioned. In development hell for over a decade, the production of the film ended up as a collaboration between a number of smaller studios that included Independent Productions, Kanzaman Productions S.L., Séville Pictures, Prescience, Lipsync Productions LLP and the Wales Creative IP Fund. Marks was the main consultant for the film and for Ifans. The DVD includes a commentary by Howard Marks and a featurette in which Ifans impersonates Marks while both get intoxicated during a stand-up show, much to the delight of the crowd. Mr Nice was filmed in 2009 in Benidorm, Spain. The film features a 1960s pop-inspired soundtrack by Philip Glass, with original songs reflective of the era such as the works of Deep Purple, Pink Floyd, Fraternity of Man and John Lennon.

== Reception ==
=== Box office ===
Mr Nice made its world premiere at the South by Southwest Film Festival in Texas, United States, in March 2010 and was first shown in the UK at the Edinburgh Film Festival in June 2010. On 8 October 2010, it was released in the UK on 107 screens, taking in a first weekend gross of £528,534. In June 2011, it was released in the United States.

=== Awards ===
Mr Nice won the Award for Best Cinematography at the 2010 Kodak Awards.

=== Critical reception ===
Mr Nice polarized critics. As of June 2020, the film holds a 53% approval rating on Rotten Tomatoes, based on 45 reviews with an average rating of 5.53 out of 10.

Dan Jolin of the film magazine Empire gave Mr Nice three out of five stars, writing "A solid, often entertaining life-of-crimer which benefits from some stylistic touches and a faithful, convincing central performance."

Kevin Thomas of Los Angeles Times gave the film 3.5 out of 5 stars, calling the Philip Glass soundtrack "pulsating" and writing: "Though the film takes a while to cast its spell, writer-director-cinematographer Bernard Rose's close observation of Marks and those around him becomes increasingly involving and allows Rose to comment on the widespread failure of the war on drugs."

Time Out London gave the film four out of five stars, although it noted that the film was not without flaws: "The film adaptation of Howard Marks' autobiography – a student staple throughout the land – struggles to capture the sheer breadth of Marks' life." "Rather than riotous picaresque, the result is more like a meandering shaggy dog story."

Benjamin Mercer of The Village Voice also gave a polarized review, awarding the film 3.5 out of 5 stars, yet also claiming that the film gave him the impression of glorifying cannabis use, or at the very least, being a vehicle for the advocation of legalizing cannabis - "Though told here with appealing drollness, Marks' story makes an odd vessel for the filmmakers' casually advanced legalization arguments, what with its mischief making on the grandest scale possible."
