= Amber Marks =

British barrister and author

Amber Mary Marks (born October 1977) is a British barrister and author. After working as a lawyer in private practice and in the UK government legal service, she took up research on the increasing use of sniffer dogs and other olfactory surveillance methods. She has written an account of her research for the popular market, Headspace (published 2008); in connection with this publication, articles by or about her were published by some of the major English newspapers. She also works in forensic science and criminal justice technologies. She is a trustee of Release.

Marks has taught at the London School of Economics, Queen Mary, University of London and King's College London. She co-directs the Criminal Justice Centre at QMUL.

Marks' father was former teacher, convicted drug smuggler, and author Howard Marks and her mother is author Judy Marks.

== Works ==
- Marks, A. (2006). Drug detection dogs and the growth of olfactory surveillance: Beyond the rule of law? Surveillance & Society, 4, 257–271.
- Marks, A. (2008). Headspace. London: Virgin Books. ISBN 978-0-7535-1364-4.
- Marks, A. et al. (2008). Crime Control Technologies: Towards an Analytical Framework and Research Agenda. Regulating Technologies, ed. R. Brownsword, K. Yeung. Oxford: Hart. ISBN 978-1-84113-788-9.
- "Bladerunner and biometrics: Heathrow T5 unveiled". The Register. 26 March 2008.
- Smells Suspicious. The Guardian, 31 March 2008.
- Don't Kill Me: Can we trust new weapons that are supposed to be non-lethal?. Prospect, 4 July 2009.
