= Robin Friday =

English footballer (1952–1990)

- Friday in 1974

Personal information
- Date of birth: 27 July 1952
- Place of birth: Acton, London, England
- Date of death: 22 December 1990 (aged 38)
- Place of death: Acton, London, England
- Height: 5 ft 11 in (1.80 m)
- Position: Forward

Youth career
- 1965–1966: Queens Park Rangers
- 1966–1967: Chelsea
- 1968–1969: Reading

Senior career*
Years	Team	Apps	(Gls)
1971	Walthamstow Avenue	8	(2)
1971–1973	Hayes	67	(39)
1973	Enfield	3	(1)
1973–1974	Hayes	18	(7)
1974–1976	Reading	121	(46)
1976–1977	Cardiff City	21	(6)
Total		238	(101)
- * Club domestic league appearances and goals

Robin Friday (27 July 1952 – 22 December 1990) was an English footballer who played professionally as a forward for Reading and Cardiff City during a career that lasted four years in the mid-1970s. (Note: 27 January 1974 (first Football League game) or 6 February 1974 (signed professionally) to 20 December 1977 (retired)) earning the nickname "lower league George Best". His on-field performances were regarded as excellent, and he won Reading's player of the year award in both of his full seasons there, as well as being the leading goal scorer. However, his habit of unsettling opponents through physical intimidation contributed to a heavily tarnished disciplinary record, and his personal life was one of heavy smoking, drinking, womanising and drug abuse. Despite his short career, he remains prominent in the memory of Reading and Cardiff supporters, both as a player and a personality. He has been voted Reading's best ever player three times and was inducted into the club's Hall of Fame in 2022.

Born and raised in Acton, West London, Friday was scouted, but not retained, by four professional clubs during his teenage years. He appeared for local semi-professional sides in the Isthmian League until he joined Charlie Hurley's Fourth Division Reading team in 1974; quickly becoming a key player, he helped Reading to win promotion to the Third Division during the 1975–76 season. As his drug habit intensified, Friday's form began to dip in the first half of the 1976–77 season, leading Reading to sell him to Second Division side Cardiff City around the New Year. Friday travelled to join his new team by train without a valid ticket and had to be bailed by the Cardiff manager Jimmy Andrews before he signed for the club. He performed strongly on his debut, but afterwards his form declined and his personal life caused him to repeatedly miss matches altogether. Following a number of incidents, on and off the field—including kicking Mark Lawrenson in the face mid-game (Note: According to some recent sources, Friday defecated in Lawrenson's kit bag after being sent off. Contemporary reports from the South Wales Echo and London Daily Mirror, a 1987 profile included in The Bluebirds and interviews included in The Greatest Footballer You Never Saw: The Robin Friday Story, published in 1997, do not mention this, merely describing Friday's being sent off for kicking Lawrenson in the face and then leaving the ground. Sources reporting the story as true include Channel 4, the Halifax Courier and Football365, in August 2007, May 2009 and October 2010 respectively. A Guardian article from October 2010 mentions it as something Friday was "rumoured to have done". Roger Titford's December 2010 work, The Legend of Robin Friday, categorically denies that it happened and gives the story's original source as "some punk football T-shirt website".)—Friday retired from football in December 1977, aged 25. He died in Acton in 1990, aged 38, after suffering a heart attack.

The strongest aspects of Friday's game were his ball skills, footballing intelligence and physical and mental strength. Andrews labelled Friday "the complete centre-forward", and, along with numerous contemporaries, retrospectively rated Friday as good enough for the England national team. In a 2004 BBC poll, Friday was voted the top "all-time cult hero" for both Reading and Cardiff City. The Cardiff-based band Super Furry Animals dedicated their 1996 single "The Man Don't Give a Fuck" to his memory.

== Early life and non-league career ==
=== Childhood ===
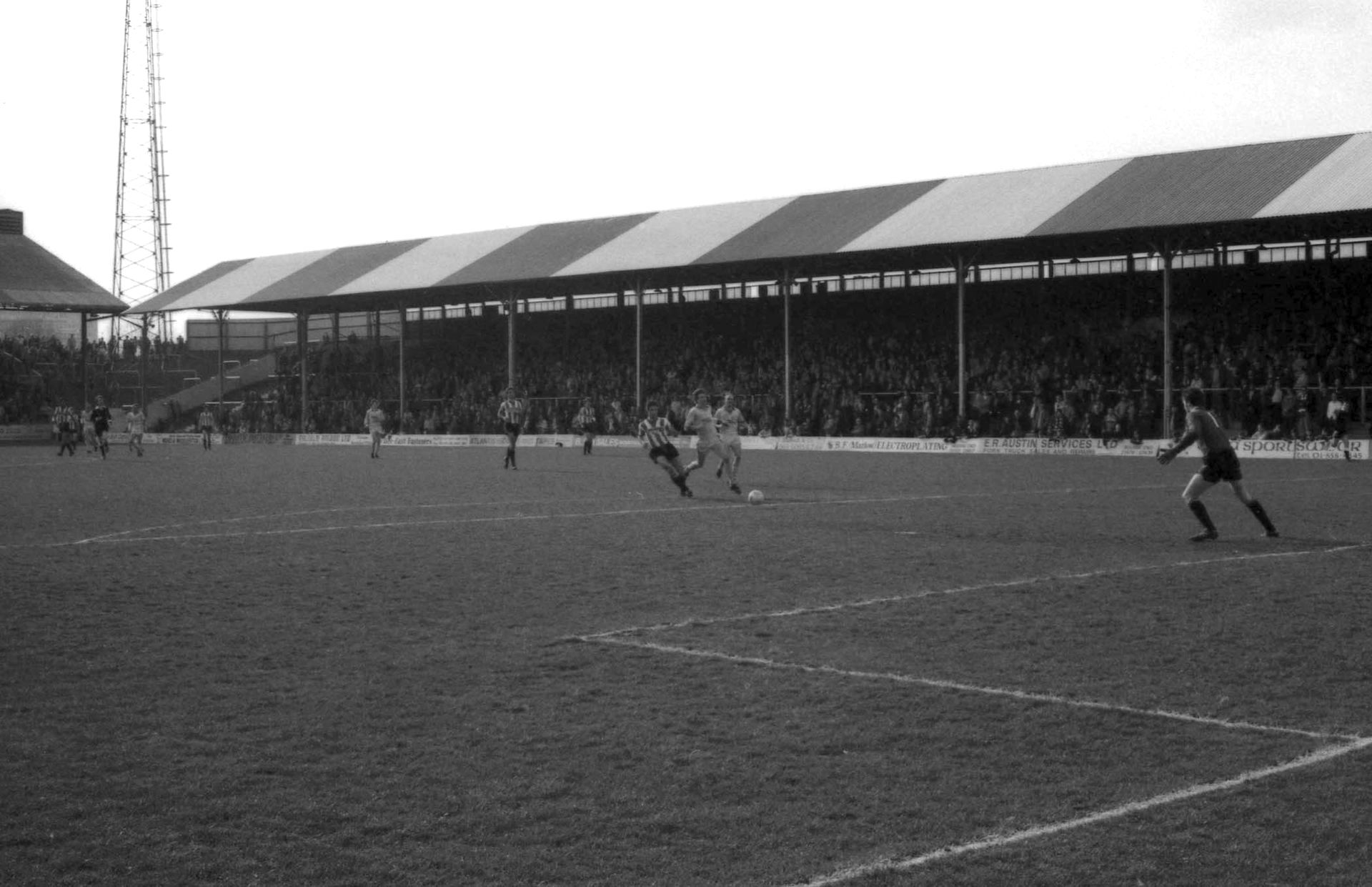
The Friday brothers saw their first professional match at the age of two, at Brentford's Griffin Park ground, pictured in 1982.

Robin Friday and his twin brother, Tony, were born on 27 July 1952 in Acton, west London. Their parents, Alf Friday, a driver for a laundry firm, and his wife Sheila, were both born in Acton and had married a year before, both aged 20, having met three years earlier. Sheila's father, Frederick Riding, had played professional football for Brentford before the Second World War. The Fridays lived with Sheila's family until moving into a prefab of their own in Acton Green when Robin and Tony were aged two; they moved to a maisonette in South Acton in 1962 when it was found that the prefab was sinking. Robin and Tony were later described by their mother as having been remarkably close, rarely arguing or fighting. A noticeable difference in personality was that Robin was shy, whereas Tony was more confident. The twins attended their first professional match at the age of two, when their father took them to a Brentford match at Griffin Park. From the age of four Alf took both boys to play football at a local park every afternoon.

Around the age of ten, Friday possessed notable ball-skills, and according to his father could flick an orange up onto his neck, balance it and then let it roll it back down his body and catch it on his foot. As well as football, Robin played cricket to a high standard, boxed and played tennis. Despite their many similarities and common interest in sports and football in particular, the twins were wildly different in academic terms: while Tony did well at school, Friday was uninterested and according to his brother "was always bunking off, having birds around the park".

Friday was scouted by numerous London sides during his teenage years, joining Crystal Palace's school of excellence at 12 or 13, then moving on to Queens Park Rangers aged 13 and then to Chelsea, with whom he attended the 1967 FA Cup final; as one of the club's youth players, he was part of the team's official party. However, Friday's individual style of play and refusal to change his game resulted in each of these clubs losing patience with him. The twin brothers joined a men's team, the Acton British Legion Reserves, aged 14, and in some matches would play alongside their father. Tony played in midfield, and Robin up front, but according to Tony his brother was better as a goalkeeper than a forward: "He was a brilliant goalkeeper. He had no fear ... But he obviously preferred banging them in at the other end". Around this time Robin became interested in music, dancing and attending concerts; he also had a talent for drawing, but suddenly abandoned this interest at 15. Robin became more outgoing than his brother and started taking drugs in his mid-teens. He left school at 15, a year before Tony, and began training as a plasterer.

=== Borstal, first marriage and the Isthmian League ===
Friday lasted two months as a plasterer before moving on to become first a van driver for a grocery firm, then a window cleaner. His laid-back attitude and indifference was already clear: in his father's words, "he didn't care". Friday regularly stole by this time, but despite numerous convictions, did not go to a detention centre until he was 16. Having been caught stealing what Tony recalled to be "a car radio or something", he was released almost immediately because he suffered from asthma. However, after he re-offended three months later he was sent to Feltham Borstal where he served 14 months. During his time there, Friday became stronger and fitter and also starred for the Borstal football team. He was selected for the prison league's all-star men's team, still aged 16, and allowed out of Borstal to train and play with Reading's youth team, for which he appeared three times in the South East Counties League during the 1968–69 season.

After his release, Friday returned to Acton, where he had a girlfriend called Maxine Doughan, who was of mixed race. The local controversy surrounding the interracial relationship caused the couple and their circle of friends to be socially isolated, and led to a physical attack on the group one night in an Acton public house. Despite this, and the opposition by both sets of parents—Alf refused to even attend the wedding—they married, both aged 17 and had a daughter named Nicola. Friday did not take his marital commitments seriously and continued to womanise, drink heavily and take narcotics. A friend who played for Walthamstow Avenue, a semi-professional Isthmian League club from north-east London, took Friday along to training one day in early 1971. Friday played well enough for Walthamstow to sign him the same day on wages of £10 per week. Many of his new teammates were asphalters from east London, and Friday soon joined them in that trade.

Locations of Friday's non-League clubs in relation to his home in Acton, shown within Greater London

Friday made his debut for Walthamstow on 27 March 1971, against Bromley, coming off the bench to set up Walthamstow's equaliser. His first goal came on 17 April, when playing against Tooting & Mitcham he once again appeared as a substitute and scored a header late in the game. He joined west London club Hayes in December 1971 after scoring twice against them in an Isthmian League match. Hayes offered £30 per week, and were also based closer to his home in Acton. A near-fatal accident at work in July 1972 caused Friday to undergo extensive surgery; while working on a roof in Lambeth, a hoist rope became stuck on the scaffold he was working on. The Hayes forward attempted to free the rope but fell and landed on a large spike: the spike went up through one of his buttocks, through his stomach and narrowly avoided a lung. Not only was Friday strong enough to pull himself off the spike, he recovered from his injuries within three months and returned to the Hayes team in October 1972.

Friday was known at Hayes for his excessive drinking, and on one occasion the team started a match a player short because Friday had not turned up. When he finally arrived, eighty minutes after kick-off, his intoxication was obvious, but he was still sent onto the pitch with the match still goalless. The opposition paid him little attention and Friday scored a late winning goal. Hayes were drawn to play Football League Fourth Division club Reading in the FA Cup's second round on 9 December 1972; the team managed to draw 0–0 at Reading and earn the right to a replay at home, which they lost 1–0 three days later. Although Hayes had lost, the interest of Reading manager Charlie Hurley was piqued. Hurley travelled to Hayes more than once to watch Friday. Having researched the player's background, he was cautious about signing him, but was impressed all the same by his on-field performances.

The 1972–73 season was Friday's most prolific non-League year in terms of goals. He briefly joined Enfield early in the 1973–74 season and scored against Hayes in an FA Cup tie before returning to west London in December 1973. Having also been approached by Third Division side Watford, Friday signed for Hurley's Reading side in January 1974 for £750. He had scored 46 goals in 67 appearances for Hayes over his two spells there, but during his three Isthmian League seasons had been sent off seven times. Friday signed as an amateur, meaning that although he would be contracted to Reading he would be able to continue appearing for Hayes and working as an asphalter in London; he would train part-time with Reading and play for their reserve team.

== Professional career ==
=== Reading ===
==== 1973–74 ====
In his very first training session they were playing a six-a-side game and Robin went around trying to kick as many of the established Reading players as he could. He must have put two or three out of the game. Hurley had to call him off ...

— Reading F.C. historian David Downs recounts Friday's first training session with Reading

In Hurley's words, Friday "trained like he played"; "he had no other way of playing". His new manager had to take him out of training on occasion because of the injuries he would inflict on his own teammates in his effort to win. By late January 1974, Reading were on a run of 14 games with only two victories, while Friday had performed strongly in three reserve matches. Hurley registered the amateur forward to play in the Football League on 23 January 1974 and gave him his first-team debut four days later. Friday turned in a performance away at Northampton Town that the Reading Evening Post called "outstanding" as Reading drew 3–3. The team then travelled to Barnsley on 3 February, having not won away from home in four months. After Barnsley led 2–0 at half-time, Friday scored his first League goal with a header just after the break to make the score 2–1. Reading immediately offered a professional contract, which Friday signed on 6 February 1974. His new salary was half what he had earned as an asphalter.

Friday's technical ability made him very popular among Reading supporters and pressmen alike. The Reading Evening Post report of Reading's 4–1 victory over Exeter City on 10 February 1974, Friday's first match as a professional, described his performance as "sheer magic" as he scored twice. The report also called Friday's first goal of the day "glorious": he collected the ball wide on the left wing, took it past four Exeter defenders and then fired the ball low and hard into the opposite corner from the edge of the penalty area. Friday was conspicuous in the professional ranks for never wearing shin pads, and for his resistance to physical harm; no matter how badly he was hurt he would always get up and continue.

After sustaining a calf injury against Exeter, he returned for the team's next game, away at Lincoln City on 17 February. Friday was repeatedly and cynically fouled by the opposing players and sustained injuries necessitating five minutes on the sideline late in the first half. However, he recovered, returned to the game and set up both Reading goals as his side prevailed by a score of two goals to nil. The team's next game, on 24 February 1974, was at home against Doncaster Rovers, and with Friday playing a key role Reading won 5–0. In particular, Friday scored a goal after 17 minutes described by the Evening Post reporter as "magical": with the score 1–0 to Reading, Friday received the ball near the edge of the penalty area, at a tight angle, and coolly kicked the ball with the outside of his boot low across goal, towards the far post. Although it appeared to be heading yards wide of the net, the ball suddenly curved in at the last possible moment—"right around the goalie", in the phrase of Reading F.C. historian David Downs—and clipped the goalpost before nestling in the back of the net. "The team that has been transformed by Robin Friday has now scored a remarkable 16 goals in five games," reported the Evening Post, "and the highlight of this joyous afternoon was a goal by Friday that was worth anyone's admission money on its own."

Despite his immediate impact on the pitch and the upturn in Reading's form, Friday's off-the-field activities unsettled some of his teammates. Most tolerated his lifestyle because of his importance to the team, but some, particularly defender Tommy Youlden, were sceptical. He drank extremely heavily, favouring American Colt 45 malt liquor, and his antics during his drinking sessions caused many landlords to lose patience with him. For example, Friday was barred from Caversham's Crown public house after he ended a night there leaping between the tables and dancing on the bar. The Boar's Head in Reading banned him on ten separate occasions. One night, after the pubs closed, Friday and a friend, Rod Lewington, went to an all-night club called Churchill's where they could continue drinking. When they entered, Friday, wearing a long overcoat and hobnail boots, walked onto the dancefloor and removed the coat to reveal that he was wearing nothing underneath. He then began to dance, completely naked apart from the boots.

Although Churchill's, described by Lewington as "the worst club that has ever been in Reading", tolerated such behaviour, the town's fashionable Sindlesham Mill nightclub did not, regularly barring Friday for his bizarre activities, including a dance he invented called "the elephant" which consisted of turning the pockets of his jeans inside out and undoing his flies to expose himself. He and his friends would regularly drink all day, though he was able to exert some self-control; according to his friend Syd Simmonds, Friday would obey Hurley's instruction not to drink for 48 hours before each game. However, he would play his prized heavy metal records very loudly at any time of the day or night and take LSD with casual indifference. Hurley attempted to calm Friday down by moving him into an apartment above the football club's elderly ex-groundsman, but to no avail: "Even if it was three in the morning, the first thing would be to get the music playing", Simmonds later said. "We had an old boy living below us ... the ex-groundsman at Reading. He was coming up to 80 and he had a dog's life in the flat. Pounding music, people knocking on the door, girls throwing stones at the windows. Poor old sod."

==== 1974–75 ====
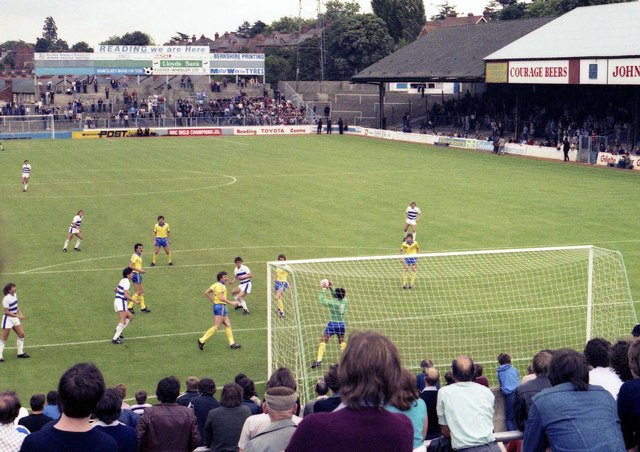
Friday played home matches for Reading at Elm Park, pictured in 1981.

Reading finished the 1973–74 season in sixth position, one place higher than the previous year. Friday underwent an operation to have tattoos removed from his fingers during the summer break, and afterwards joined a hippie commune in Cornwall, neglecting to inform Reading of this latter decision. He was absent without explanation when training started for the 1974–75 season in July 1974, arriving only on the day of a closed-doors friendly against Watford. Despite his lack of training, he far out-performed the rest of the team. He continued to play well when the League programme began the following month. By September 1974 he was attracting the interest of First Division sides Sheffield United and Arsenal. The former had been following him since the game at Barnsley back in February, when he had still been an amateur. Arsenal manager Bertie Mee personally attended Reading's 4–2 home win over Rotherham United on 12 September, but neither his team nor Sheffield United attempted to sign Friday.

After Reading despatched Newport County 3–0 on 14 September 1974, Friday and his forward partner Dick Habbin had scored six goals each and topped the Football League goalscoring charts. However, at the same time Friday's disciplinary record was becoming so bad that even the Evening Post, usually favourable to him, criticised him on 30 September 1974, just after he had scored his first hat-trick for Reading in a 4–1 victory over Southport. He was the Football League's joint top scorer by this time with nine goals, but he had also already been booked three times that season and the Post argued that by constantly risking suspension he was letting the team down. Under the system then used, the three bookings gave him an automatic two-match suspension. The article argued that missing games because of "completely unnecessary" and "stupid" infractions amounted to selling the club short.

Friday's behaviour on Reading away trips was unpredictable and erratic: in the words of teammate John Murray, "Some of the things he did were funny but other times they were just mad". On the way back from one away match, the team bus pulled over and Friday noticed that they were beside a cemetery. Friday jumped over the wall and stole some stone angels from a grave, intending to place them beside the club chairman Frank Waller, who was sleeping on the coach. When he returned, Hurley sternly told him that "you must never ever desecrate a graveyard"—Friday dutifully returned the statues. On another occasion, Friday reacted to the news that a teammate had smuggled a girl into his hotel room by kicking the door in. Later on the same night he walked into the bar carrying a swan that he had found in the hotel grounds.

During an FA Cup tie away against Swindon Town on 23 November, Friday began to have trouble breathing and despite leaving the game for five minutes to recuperate with an inhaler was eventually forced to come off for good, coughing violently. After recovering from what was reported to be a chest infection, he returned to the team on 28 December, having missed four matches, and marked his return with his side's only goal in a 3–1 home defeat to Stockport County. Reading dropped to 12th place on 6 January 1975, and were only three points above the re-election places; however, by the time they took on Workington at home on 3 February they had risen to 10th. Reading won 3–0, with Friday scoring the third goal with a spectacular header: "Diving full length barely a foot off the ground, Friday risked life and limb to head home a truly memorable goal", wrote the Evening Post match reporter. "True to form, he had to spoil things for himself by getting booked three minutes later".

This victory marked the beginning of a run of six wins out of seven games, after which the side was once again challenging for promotion to the third tier, hovering between sixth and eighth place for the rest of the season. By 11 April promotion looked improbable, but Friday was still overjoyed after scoring the last-minute winner in Reading's 2–1 victory over Rochdale. In celebration he ran behind the net and kissed a policeman. "The policeman looked so cold and fed up standing there", explained the Reading forward, publicly, "that I decided to cheer him up a bit." In the dressing room after the game he said, privately, that he wished he hadn't done it "because I hate coppers so much". Reading eventually finished the 1974–75 season in seventh place, five points behind the promoted teams. Friday was the club's top scorer for the season, with 18 league goals and 20 overall, and was voted its player of the year.

==== 1975–76 ====
Friday's fine form continued into the 1975–76 season; after their 4–2 victory over Hartlepool United on 23 September 1975, Reading were top of the Fourth Division having just won four games in a row. Friday, meanwhile, was the club's top scorer. The next game was against AFC Bournemouth on the 27th, and although Reading won 2–1 Friday was sent off after 79 minutes. By this time the forward was overwhelmingly popular among Reading's fans, to whom he endeared himself by performing a lap of honour after each goal he scored. A month later, after two wins, two defeats and a draw during October, the team was fourth in the table.

His [Friday's] face looks as though it had been trampled on by a rugby squad and that was before the game. Friday's explanation: 'Me missus hit me with a can of beans'.

— Extract from Reading Evening Post match report, 13 September 1975

Friday was arrested after the evening match away at Newport County on 20 October, accused of using obscene language outside a Newport nightclub. At his appearance before magistrates in Newport on 17 November, he pleaded not guilty, representing himself, and was acquitted. Performing strongly for Reading and scoring regularly, he began to attract serious interest from other clubs. "Friday is, of course, much more than Reading's top scorer and best striker", wrote the Evening Post on 3 November 1975. "He is the most vital cog in the team, and last week I understand Reading turned down a £60,000 bid from Cardiff City involving Welsh international Derek Showers". By the new year, Reading were third in the table, on course for promotion and two points behind league leaders Lincoln City.

After Reading went four games without a win starting on 24 January 1976, a late goal from Friday ended this run on 25 February, in a home match against Hartlepool United; twelve minutes from time, he collected a pass from Stewart Henderson and neatly placed the ball past the goalkeeper from the edge of the penalty area. "One is increasingly under the impression", the Evening Post reported, "that if Friday was out for some time through injury the Reading team would fall to pieces". Led by the free-scoring Friday, the side continued its push for promotion; fourth or higher would be enough to go up. A vital fixture on 31 March 1976 pitted fourth-placed Reading at home against Tranmere Rovers, who occupied third spot; internationally experienced referee Clive Thomas took charge of the game. Friday, who had already scored 18 goals that season, rose to the occasion with an effort that has been described by many sources as one of the greatest ever scored.

With the score 2–0 to Reading, the goalkeeper Steve Death threw the ball to the right back Gary Peters, who spotted Friday standing near the left-hand corner of the opposing penalty area. Peters passed high and diagonally across the pitch towards his forward, who jumped into the air and used his chest to cushion the ball and knock it into the air with his back to goal, about 25–30 yards away from the net. As Friday landed, he ferociously powered the ball towards goal, kicking over his shoulder and turning after the ball had gone. The shot flew straight into the top-right-hand corner of the net, stunning the crowd, players and Thomas, the referee, who put his hands over his head in disbelief. "I'll never forget it", Thomas recalled. "It was the sheer ferocity of the shot on the volley ... over his shoulder. ... If it hadn't gone into the top corner of the net it would have broken the goalpost. Even up against the likes of Pelé and Cruyff, that rates as the best goal I have ever seen." Reading went on to win the game 5–0. (Note: No video footage of the goal exists. The description and account of the goal is based on contemporary newspaper match reports from the Reading Evening Post and London Daily Mirror, as well as on accounts by the referee Clive Thomas and three spectators of the match: Reading F.C. historian David Downs, Alf Friday and Syd Simmonds.) When Thomas told Friday after the game that he had never seen a better goal, the Londoner replied, "Really? You should come down here more often, I do that every week."

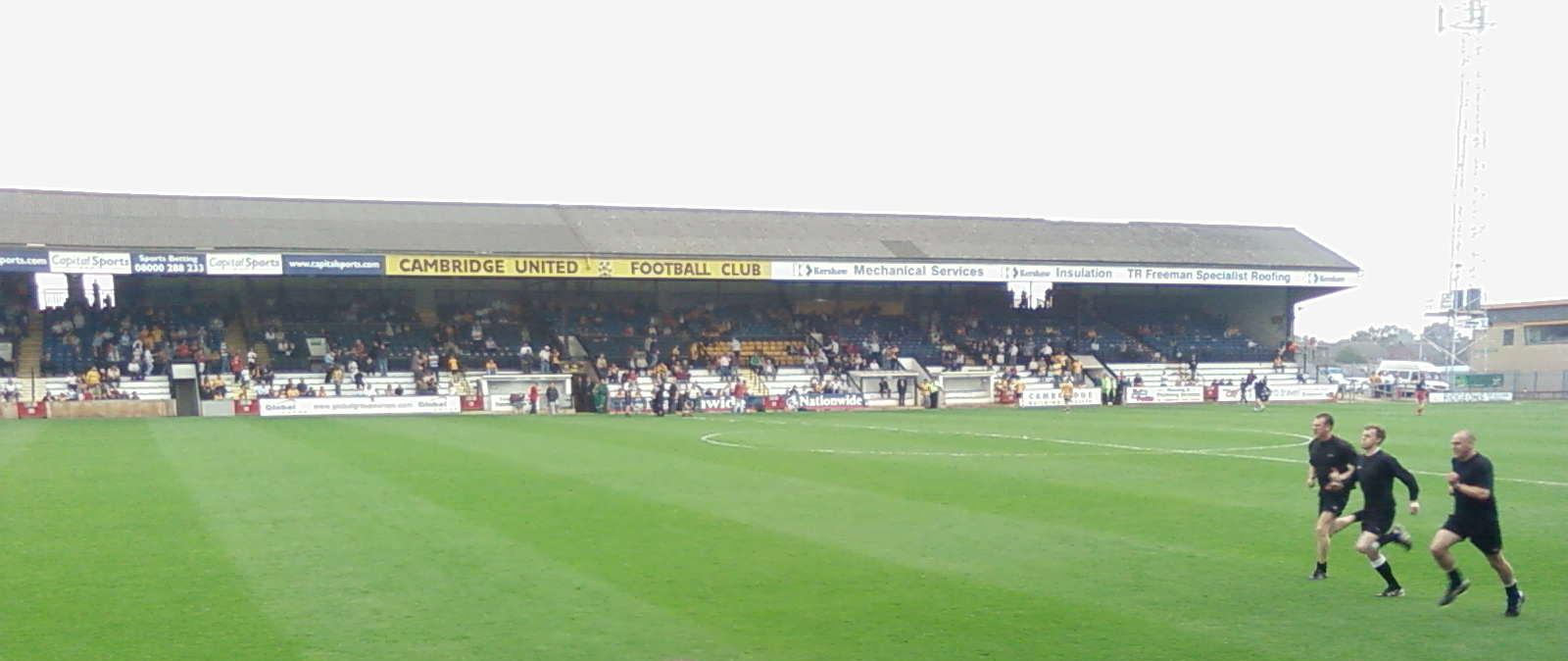
Reading secured promotion at Cambridge United's Abbey Stadium (pictured in 2007) on 21 April 1976.

Reading moved to within one point of promotion on 19 April 1976 with a 1–0 home victory over Brentford. Friday set up the game's only goal, beating three players before hitting the post with his shot; Ray Hiron scored from the rebound. Friday scored a powerful left-footed volley during the first half of a 2–2 draw away against Cambridge United two days later. The result secured Third Division football for Reading. At the celebratory dinner after the game, the Reading captain Gordon Cumming saw some fluted wine glasses, and voiced his admiration: "I wouldn't mind a few of them for home", he said. "Give us a few minutes and I'll get them for you", replied Friday. Going around the dining room and picking them off the tables, he stole a whole boxful of the glasses, which he managed to sneak out of the hotel and onto the team coach, but much to Cumming's annoyance he then decided to keep them for himself. With 22 goals for the year, 21 in the league, Friday was once more Reading's top goalscorer and for the second consecutive season the team's player of the year.

After Reading were promoted, Waller met with the players on 4 June 1976 to discuss their contracts for the 1976–77 season. The wages offered to the Reading players were far lower than they had been expecting, causing the team's morale to fall drastically. "We got screwed by the club", midfielder Eamon Dunphy later claimed. "We didn't get what we had been promised." Friday was so offended by the low salary offered that he handed in a transfer request, telling the Evening Post that the club's directors clearly did not share his ambition. "They would be happy to stroll along in the bottom half of the Third Division forever", he said. The row over the new contracts continued throughout the off-season, while Friday planned his second wedding; he had been formally divorced from Maxine after years of separation, and subsequently engaged to Liza Deimel, a Reading-born university graduate. After the pay dispute was settled on 5 August, the couple were married in Reading three days later. The wedding was filmed by Southern Television, before whose cameras Friday, wearing an open-necked tiger-skin-pattern shirt, brown velvet suit and snakeskin boots, sat on the steps of the church and rolled a joint. Friday had invited about two hundred people, mostly friends and relatives from London, who joined in the drinking and drug-taking and ending up fighting each other and stealing the couple's wedding presents, one of which was a large quantity of cannabis. Liza later called the wedding "the most hilarious thing ever". "I have been to a few weddings", recalled Rod Lewington, "but never one like that."

==== Later 1976 ====
"He lost his way when we got promotion", Hurley later reflected. "He really must have celebrated all through the summer". Friday reported back for pre-season training in bad condition, and although Hurley claimed that Friday was trying hard to regain fitness, the forward was having trouble with his asthma, had lost some of his pace and was obviously unfit. Although his performances during August quickly improved, they were still not up to his previous standard and the Evening Post revealed on the 30th that Reading were preparing to sell him "to a First Division club". After scoring in two successive Reading home wins on 4 and 7 September, against Walsall and Wrexham respectively, Friday took part in a third consecutive victory on the 13th, away against Northampton Town. After this he missed two matches, according to the Post because he was suffering from flu, and when he returned to the team was far from his best; "Suddenly he had lost a yard and his control of the ball was not as good", Hurley recalled.

Hurley was by now aware that his forward was using drugs, and attempted to keep his player's habit a secret while he patiently worked to bring him back around. However, Friday began to regularly miss training and Hurley's subtlety was misinterpreted as inaction by the other Reading players, who became unsettled and complained about Friday's conduct. The club became increasingly minded to sell him, but although top-flight clubs Queens Park Rangers and West Ham United were interested, they were reluctant to buy because of Friday's temperament; in Downs's words, "They weren't sure they could handle him". By the end of October 1976, Hurley had given up on attempting to rehabilitate his player, believing that the only solution was to sell him to a bigger team. "The squad needs you but I owe it to the club because I can't have you using drugs," Hurley told Friday. "If I know you're using drugs it won't take them [the major clubs] long to find out. You have got to get your act together." Friday was made available for transfer, at his own request, on 28 October.

Friday was watched by other clubs throughout November and December 1976, but although he performed well in some games, including a 1–1 draw away at Crystal Palace on 6 November in which he scored his team's only goal, he was poor in others. After being marked out of the game during Reading's 4–0 loss away against Mansfield Town on 8 November, he was substituted. "Coincidence or not", wrote the Evening Post, "when Friday left, so did half a dozen managers and scouts". Friday was so angry at his team's performance that he broke into the Mansfield dressing room and defecated in the team bath. Reading's asking price stood at £50,000, and the first transfer offer came from Second Division side Cardiff City around mid-December. Cardiff boss Jimmy Andrews bid £28,000, half of his offer a year before, which Reading's directors accepted, wanting the troublesome player off their hands as quickly as possible. Friday was reluctant to go to the Welsh club, saying that it was too far from home, that he wanted to go to a First Division team and that he wanted more money than was being offered; however, when Hurley told him that unless he went to Cardiff he would be released, he agreed and travelled to Wales on 30 December 1976.

=== Cardiff City ===
==== 1977 ====
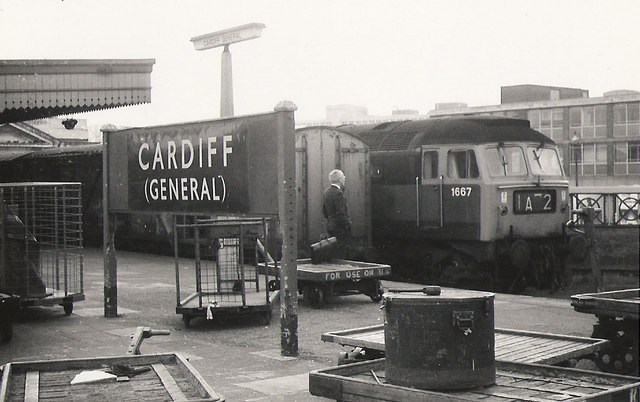
While on his way to sign for Cardiff City, Friday arrived at Cardiff Central railway station (pictured in 1970) without a valid ticket and was arrested.

On arrival at Cardiff Central railway station, Friday was arrested by the British Transport Police for having travelled from Reading with only a platform ticket. Andrews bailed his new player out of police custody and took him to Ninian Park to sign the contract. Despite the manner of Friday's arrival, and although he knew there "had to be something wrong with him", the Cardiff manager was still happy with his purchase, describing the £28,000 transfer as "an absolute steal". After a long night of drinking the night before his Cardiff debut, Friday lined up against Fulham on 1 January 1977. The Fulham defence included former England captain Bobby Moore, but Friday marked his first match for the Welsh club with two goals; he also squeezed Moore's testicle during the game as Cardiff won 3–0. Andrews was so happy with Friday's performance that he phoned Hurley two days later, on Monday morning. "Oh, Charlie", Andrews gushed, "he was magnificent. He tore them inside out. ... Moore was chasing him all over the place". The Cardiff manager continued to heap praise on his new acquisition until Hurley finally stopped him. "Jimmy, you've only had him four days", he warned, sombrely: "Give it a few months"...

Friday's form declined after his strong debut and his personal life remained troubled and chaotic, leading him to vanish regularly and miss Cardiff matches. He was supposed to be living in Bristol, but his manager would often find on visiting his house that he had been elsewhere for weeks. Leslie Hamilton, the Cardiff club doctor, later said that he had believed at the time that Andrews was being far too soft on Friday; indeed, according to teammate Paul Went, the forward would simply leave after each match and not be heard of until he returned for the next game. "He wouldn't even bother to have a shower", Went later said, in an interview. "He'd just get dressed, take his carrier-bag with his dry martini and he'd go—no explanation".

While Hurley had been able to command Friday's respect, it soon became clear that Andrews was unable to control him and that the Londoner disliked his new manager. Indeed, soon after moving to Cardiff, Friday appeared one day in Hurley's office at Elm Park asking to come back to Reading. "He still called me boss", Hurley recalled. "I can't play for that little bastard", Friday told Hurley, referring to Andrews. "You're the one who seems to be able to get me right. Can I come back to you?" Hurley replied that although he would be happy to have Friday back on the team, the club could not afford to repay the £28,000 transfer fee to Cardiff, so he would have to go back and continue playing there. Unhappy living so far from home, Friday began to travel back to London at weekends; he avoided paying rail fares by knocking on locked toilet doors and shouting, "Tickets, please!", pretending to be the ticket inspector. When the occupant passed his ticket under the door to be checked, Friday would pick it up, walk off and use it for himself. Paul Went also recalled an incident during training when he had thrown a ball out from goal and accidentally hit Friday on the back of the head. Steve Grapes, who was standing near the forward, started laughing, leading Friday to conclude that he had thrown the ball. Friday viciously punched Grapes in the jaw, striking him with such force that he wore a neck brace for two weeks afterwards.

Late in Friday's first season in Wales, Cardiff took on Luton Town on 16 April 1977. Cardiff were in the relegation zone and had not won in seven games, while Luton were fifth in the table and challenging for promotion. After clashing repeatedly early in the match with Luton goalkeeper Milija Aleksic, Friday was lectured by the referee for a high tackle on the goalkeeper in the 36th minute. Friday held out a hand to apologise, but Aleksic reacted angrily. When the free kick was taken, Friday ran back, stole the ball from Luton defender John Faulkner, broke away, rounded Aleksic and slotted the ball past him into the net. In celebration, Friday jogged back past the goalkeeper while giving him the V-sign. Cardiff won the match 4–2 and at the end of the season avoided relegation to the third tier only on goal difference. Meanwhile, without Friday, Reading were relegated back to the Fourth Division by one point. Friday's actions became even stranger during his time at Cardiff; after they lost the second leg of the Welsh Cup final 3–0 to Shrewsbury Town on 18 May 1977, (Note: Shrewsbury won 4–2 on aggregate; Cardiff had won the first leg 2–1 on 16 May 1977 at Ninian Park with Friday scoring their second goal.) the players and staff were awoken in the middle of the night by loud bangs coming from below their rooms. The cause was found to be Friday, standing on the hotel's snooker table in his underpants and throwing the balls around the room in fury.

==== 1977–78 ====
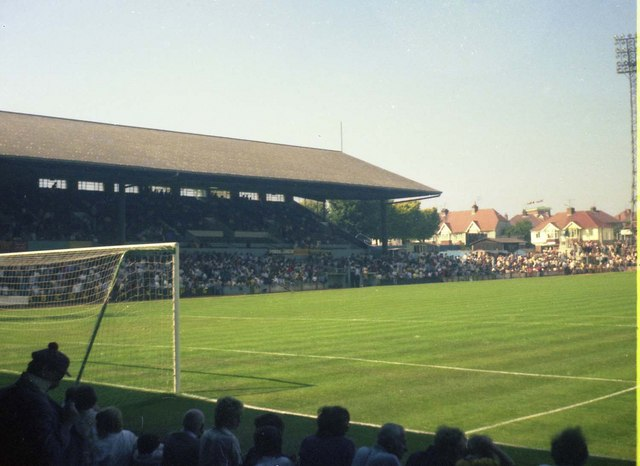
Friday's penultimate professional match was played at Brighton & Hove Albion's Goldstone Ground, pictured here in 1976.

After failing to turn up for pre-season training with Cardiff before the 1977–78 season, Friday was reported to be in a London hospital suffering from an unknown virus which had caused him to lose 2 stone (13 kg; 28 lb) in weight. When he suddenly appeared in Cardiff for training in October, two months into the season, he claimed to have been suffering from hepatitis, but medical tests disproved this. However, it has since been discovered by author Stuart Kane that Friday had actually been arrested for impersonating a police officer and had been convicted at Bow Street Magistrates' Court on 22 September 1977, where he was sent to HM Prison Pentonville, but was bailed out shortly after before returning to Cardiff. Andrews told the local press that on arrival Friday had looked "like the fittest player in the world", and hoping to avoid further disappearances persuaded a reluctant Friday to move from Bristol to Cardiff. The Londoner returned to the team for the away match at Brighton & Hove Albion on 29 October 1977, with Cardiff once again in the relegation zone, in 20th place on goal difference.

Friday was marked during the game by Mark Lawrenson, who so frustrated the Cardiff forward with his close attention that Friday waited for Lawrenson to attempt a slide tackle and then kicked him in the face. After receiving a red card, Friday left the ground with the game still going on; according to legend, before leaving he broke into the Brighton dressing room and defecated in Lawrenson's kit bag. Cardiff eventually lost 4–0. "I am sick and tired of it", Andrews told the South Wales Echo on 1 November. "To be sent off in his first game back is as much as a man can stand". Friday was transfer-listed and served a three-match suspension before making his final appearance on 10 December in Cardiff's 6–3 away defeat against Bolton. Liza was by now the mother of Friday's second daughter, Arabella, but around this time began divorce proceedings. Friday claimed that he had had enough of people telling him what to do, and walked into Andrews's office on 20 December 1977 to announce that he was retiring from professional football. The club promptly released him and cancelled his contract.

== Post-retirement ==
After retiring, Friday moved back to London and returned to work as an asphalter and decorator. Soon after Friday left Cardiff, Reading manager Maurice Evans was presented with a petition, signed by 3,000 supporters, requesting that he attempt to re-sign Friday. Evans contacted Friday and told him: "If you would just settle down for three or four years, you could play for England". Friday replied with the question "How old are you?", and after Evans answered, continued: "I'm half your age and I've lived twice your life". Evans reflected, "You may well be right". Friday trained with Brentford during the 1978–79 pre-season, but after regaining his fitness suddenly changed his mind and stopped coming to training. He married for a third time in 1980, but was divorced again within three years. After a short time living back with his parents in Acton, Friday's family secured him a housing association flat in the area. He served a prison sentence during the 1980s for impersonating a police officer and confiscating people's drugs.

== Death ==
At the funeral I have never seen so many people ... When we got to the flat, the stairs and corridors leading to his mum's front door were packed with people.

— Liza Friday, second wife

Friday was found dead in his Acton flat on 22 December 1990, at the age of 38, having suffered a fatal heart attack.

Biographer Paolo Hewitt claimed that Friday's heart attack was the result of "a suspected heroin overdose".

== Style of play and legacy ==
Friday's 1977 altercation with Milija Aleksic, depicted on the cover of Super Furry Animals' 1996 single "The Man Don't Give a Fuck", a song dedicated to his memory.

Friday is often cited as an unsung talent. His nickname while a player was "Man Friday", which was used as the title of two-fact based novels about him of the same name by author Stuart Kane. A latterly applied nickname, "the greatest footballer you never saw", was used as the title of his 1997 biography, co-written by Oasis bass player Paul McGuigan and Hewitt. Both as a player and a personality, Friday remains a major figure for both of his professional clubs. BBC Radio Berkshire Sports Editor Tim Dellor, speaking in 2010, emphasised the importance of Friday's charisma to his contemporary and retrospective appeal, a point which was also highlighted by his second wife, Liza (and have one daughter together), who likened his personal charm to that of "a pied piper". In terms of significance to Reading F.C., Dellor stated that Friday was the team's "very own George Best". Cardiff-based band Super Furry Animals used a photograph of him giving the V-sign to Aleksic in 1977 for the artwork of their 1996 single "The Man Don't Give a Fuck", which was dedicated to his memory "and his stand against 'the Man'".

After winning the title of "Player of the Millennium" from Reading in 1999, he was voted the top "all-time cult hero" for both Reading and Cardiff in a 2004 BBC poll; with similar polls taking place at each Premier League and Football League club, he was the only player to appear in the top three for two different sides. In 2007, a poll of fans run by Reading resulted in his once more being named the club's best ever. Later that year, when the Professional Footballers' Association (PFA) canvassed Reading supporters for their all-time favourite, Friday won again. In a parallel PFA survey, Cardiff fans chose one of Friday's former teammates, Wales international defender Phil Dwyer. Friday was ranked first in Channel 4's list of football "bad boys" in August 2007, while Football365 placed him at eighth place in a 2010 list of "wasted talents".

Friday's style of play was based around his exceptional ball skills, described by Cardiff doctor Leslie Hamilton as "absolutely fabulous", and his instinctive footballing vision, which enabled him both to execute flamboyant individual moves and to create attacks for his teammates. Jimmy Andrews, his manager at Cardiff, later called Friday "the complete centre-forward" and placed him on a par with Alan Shearer, while Maurice Evans claimed that he could have played for England, and was at least on a level with international strikers he had worked with such as John Aldridge and Dean Saunders. This opinion was shared by Hamilton and Friday's Reading teammate John Murray, both of whom firmly declared in separate interviews that Friday would have been good enough for the England team had he "sorted his head out", in Hamilton's words.

Friday was unselfish and would take just as much pleasure out of setting up a goal scored by a teammate as netting one himself. He possessed fine ball control and dribbling skills, and could also shoot with both great power and sharp accuracy. The strong physical aspect of his game and exceptionally competitive, combative spirit combined with all of this to create a formidable forward player: such was his ability that his arrival transformed Reading into one of the division's best sides in a matter of weeks. Writing in 2010, Roger Titford stressed Friday's immediate and profound impact on the Reading team as a key factor in his lasting popularity: "It was like the comic-book stories that kids from Robin's era would have read", he wrote. "He was a ready-made star".

On top of his technical talent, Friday was physically very strong and able to withstand sustained blows or injuries. According to Hamilton, he was also uncommonly fit despite his lifestyle. He boasted an exceptional work-rate, which Dwyer recalled gave any side including him a strong boost: "When he was in the line-up you'd have a centre-forward and a centre-half; not only would he be up there running them ragged, but when it broke down he'd be the first person to start tackling back". He was assisted in this by a smooth and effective sliding tackle which despite all of Friday's attacking skills Hurley considered one of the strongest parts of his game. Reading F.C. historian David Downs described Friday's style of play as "really quite bizarre. It was more or less Robin standing in the middle and saying 'Give me the ball and I'll see what I can do with it'". On receiving the ball, he would then turn and either take on the opposing defence single-handed or run with it to the wing to cross for a teammate. "We didn't need anyone else up front", Hurley later said. "They couldn't get the ball off him. He was one of those guys who could beat five players easily". Andrews agreed: "once he'd got the ball it was almost impossible to get it off him".

Friday was known for giving his all in any game in which he played, no matter the circumstances. Hurley later said that Friday would often become furious at his teammates for not trying their best, even in training. This strong drive to always win even extended to the use of physical intimidation to unsettle opposing players, leading contemporary critics to label him a "villain". Friday also employed the use of psychological tactics; aiming to spook opposing players, Friday would kiss them or fondle their testicles. Cardiff teammate Paul Went recalled that these tricks would "completely throw" defenders and affect their concentration. Although he was often criticised for the number of bookings and sendings-off he received, Friday believed he was justified to chase victory by any means, explaining his attitude in a 1977 interview: "On the pitch I hate all opponents. I don't give a damn about anyone. People think I'm mad, a lunatic. I am a winner".

== Career statistics ==
Detailed season-by-season statistics for non-League teams are not available for this period.

Appearances and goals by club, season and competition
Club	Season	League			FA Cup		League Cup		Welsh Cup (Note: The Welsh Cup is contested only by teams based in (or near) Wales.)		Total	
Club	Season	Division	Apps	Goals	Apps	Goals	Apps	Goals	Apps	Goals	Apps	Goals
Reading	1973–74	Fourth Division	19	4	0	0	0	0	—		19	4
Reading	1974–75	Fourth Division	42	18	1	0	6	2	—		49	20
Reading	1975–76	Fourth Division	44	21	0	0	2	1	—		46	22
Reading	1976–77 (Note: Transferred from Reading to Cardiff City on 30 December 1976)	Third Division	16	3	2	2	3	2	—		21	7
Reading	Total		121	46	3	2	11	5	—		135	53
Cardiff City	1976–77	Second Division	19	6	—		—		4	1	23	7
Cardiff City	1977–78	Second Division	2	0	0	0	0	0	0	0	2	0
Cardiff City	Total		21	6	0	0	0	0	4	1	25	7
Career total			142	52	3	2	11	5	4	1	160	60

== Honours ==
Hayes

- Middlesex Senior Charity Cup: 1972–73

Reading

- Football League Fourth Division: 3rd place, 1975–76; promotion to Football League Third Division

Cardiff City

- Welsh Cup: runner-up, 1976–77

Individual

- Reading F.C. player of the season: 1974–75, 1975–76
- Reading F.C. top goalscorer: 1974–75, 1975–76
- Reading F.C. Hall of Fame: 2022

== Bibliography ==
- Brown, Paul (2004). Balls: Tales From Football's Nether Regions. Edinburgh: Mainstream Publishing. ISBN 1-84018-930-4.
- Crooks, John (December 1987). The Bluebirds: A Who's Who of Cardiff City Football League Players. Pontypool: J. Crooks. ISBN 0-9511984-1-6.
- Kane, Stuart (2020). Man Friday: The First Half (The Life and Times of Robin Friday). Birmingham: Helpston Fuller. ISBN 978-1-8380269-0-5.
- Kane, Stuart (2020). Man Friday: The Second Half (The Life and Times of Robin Friday). Birmingham: Helpston Fuller. ISBN 978-1-8380269-7-4.
- McGuigan, Paul; Hewitt, Paolo (1997). The Greatest Footballer You Never Saw: The Robin Friday Story. Edinburgh: Mainstream Publishing. ISBN 1-85158-909-0.
- Sedunary, Alan (5 November 2001). Royals Remembered; The Official Who's Who of Reading F.C. 1920–2001. Harefield: Yore Publications. ISBN 978-1-874427-04-9.
- Kane, Stuart (19 April 2020). Man Friday: The First Half. Helpston Fuller. ISBN 978-1838026912.
- Kane, Stuart (22 November 2020). Man Friday: The Second Half. Helpston Fuller. ISBN 978-1838026936.
- Owens, David (27 July 2021). "The Robin Friday story that has never been revealed - until now". Nation Cymru. Cardiff.
- Hewitt, Paolo (20 May 2009). "Robin Friday goes on a career-long bender". The Guardian. London.
- Minard, Jenny (24 December 2010). "Reading Football legend Robin Friday remembered". BBC Radio Berkshire. Reading: BBC.
- Roughley, Gregg (1 October 2010). "Football quiz: Robin Friday". The Guardian. London.
- Titford, Roger (December 2010). "The Legend of Robin Friday". When Saturday Comes. London.
