= Ice Hockey Hair =

EP by Super Furry Animals
- Released: 25 May 1998
- Recorded: 1997–1998
- Studio: Grassroots, Cardiff; Orinoco, London
- Genre: Alternative rock, psychedelic rock
- Length: 17:05
- Label: Creation
- Producer: Gorwel Owen, Super Furry Animals

Super Furry Animals chronology
Radiator (1997)	Ice Hockey Hair (1998)	Out Spaced (1998)

Ice Hockey Hair is an EP by the Welsh alternative rock band Super Furry Animals, released in 1998. The record contains four songs which the band felt did not fit in with either their previous album, 1997's Radiator, or its follow-up Guerrilla. The title track refers to an alternative name for the mullet hairstyle. The EP's opening song, "Smokin'", was commissioned by British television station Channel 4 for a programme about sloth presented by Howard Marks. "Ice Hockey Hair" was later included on 'greatest hits' compilation Songbook: The Singles, Vol. 1, issued in 2004, while "Smokin'" appeared on 1998's B-side and rarities compilation Out Spaced.

The EP received mostly positive reviews, being awarded 'single of the week' by the NME, and appearing at number two in the magazine's Single of the Year list for 1998. The record also appeared in the 1998 single of the year lists issued by both the Melody Maker and Select. Promotional music videos were issued for both "Ice Hockey Hair" and "Smokin'" and are included on the DVD version of Songbook.... The former was directed by Daf Palfrey while the latter was directed by Peter Gray.

== Recording and themes ==
Super Furry Animals "Ice Hockey Hair" (1998)
Short clip of "Ice Hockey Hair", featuring the song's first verse, bridge, and chorus. Singer Gruff Rhys has called the track a slightly naff "Badfinger-style power ballad" while reviewers have described it as a combination of Queen, ELO, and techno music.

Super Furry Animals "Smokin'" (1998)
Clip of the first verse and chorus of "Smokin'". Reviewers have claimed that the track, which Rhys has called "really light and up", exhibits disco and funk influences.

The first track on the EP, "Smokin'", was commissioned by British television station Channel 4 for a programme about sloth presented by Howard Marks as part of a series on the seven deadly sins. The band went into Grassroots, a community recording studio in Cardiff, in June 1997 and looped a sample of the Black Uhuru track "I Love King Selassie", playing along and writing "Smokin'" "completely spontaneously". According to singer Gruff Rhys the song is "really light and up" as a result of being recorded in the summer. The track's lyrics refer to smoking cannabis, with Rhys stating that it "seems ridiculous that you can't do what you want with a plant that grows naturally" in reference to the drug's illegal status in many countries. Rhys has claimed that he does not consider the track to be subversive, however — it is about the band's own drug use and he doesn't "expect everyone who buys the record to do the same. They'd be quite sad if they did".

Chief lyric writer Rhys has stated that, whereas he might "empty parts of [his] emotional state" into some songs, Ice Hockey Hair's title track was written in the "instant pop music" tradition. The track was originally called "Naff Gan" (a.k.a. "The Naff Song") as the band felt it "had so many naff, cheesy things about it" before being renamed "Ice Hockey Hair" following a conversation with a Swedish football player who said that having 'ice hockey hair', an alternative name for the mullet hairstyle, was a really naff thing to do in his home country. Rhys has described the song as a "Badfinger-style power ballad" and claimed that it is about "someone who's sunk so low they're asking advice off a woman with ice hockey hair". The track was recorded at Orinonco Studios, London.

The band felt that "Ice Hockey Hair" and "Smokin'" were "light relief" and needed to be released so that they could concentrate on their next album, Guerrilla, with Rhys stating that the "EP was a good chance to do something in isolation, because the tracks on it won't fit in with the new album, and they didn't fit in with the old one". The EP is completed by "Let's Quit Smoking", a remix of "Smokin'", and "Mu-Tron", a largely instrumental track named after the Mu-Tron guitar effects pedal and written by keyboardist Cian Ciaran.

== Release and reception ==
Professional ratings
Review scores
Source	Rating
AllMusic	3/5 stars
Melody Maker	(favourable)
NME	(very favourable)
Vox	(very favourable)

Ice Hockey Hair was released on CD, 7" and cassette on 25 May 1998 and reached number 12 on the UK Singles Chart. The CD version of the EP has four tracks while the 7" and cassette feature only "Ice Hockey Hair" and "Smokin'". A 12" vinyl release of Ice Hockey Hair was issued in June 1998 and includes all four songs from the CD version albeit in a different track order. The proverb "Decadence may not be seen as a wholly negative process neither should it be viewed as a terminal state. It's a stage in the process of regeneration and renewal" was to have been featured on Ice Hockey Hair's sleeve but the band eventually decided against the idea as they felt the phrase was too long. "Ice Hockey Hair" was included on the band's 'greatest hits' compilation Songbook: The Singles, Vol. 1, issued in 2004, while "Smokin'" was included on 1998's B-side and rarities compilation Out Spaced. The Wildhearts recorded a cover of "Ice Hockey Hair" for their 2008 album Stop Us If You've Heard This One Before, Vol 1.

The Melody Maker called the Ice Hockey Hair EP "brilliant, predictably freakish weirdness" and described it as a cross between The Beach Boys and techno while guest reviewers Therapy? claimed to like "Smokin'" better than "Ice Hockey Hair" which they thought was "full-on smoker music". Vox stated that Ice Hockey Hair proved the band's "placid casual grasp of the concept of genius", describing the title track as a "gooey, melted mix of Queen, ELO, Pavement and [...] Techno Animal" and "Smokin'", which they felt was the EP's stand-out song, as "deranged disco delirium". The NME felt that the EP showed the Super Furry Animals had fulfilled their early promise and was the result of the band having "ideas like most people have cups of tea", awarding Ice Hockey Hair 'single of the week' in their 23 May 1998 issue. The magazine called "Smokin'" "compact disco" and stated that "Mu-Tron" was an "ugly name for a beautiful song". "Ice Hockey Hair" was described as a combination of Queen, ELO, Wings, and "mad techno squalling" which sounds like "Elton John's glitter-coated grand piano" falling from the sky. AllMusic described the Ice Hockey Hair EP as "another fun, cool group of songs from a band that can seemingly do no wrong" which bridges the gap between the "spaced-out rock" of 1997's Radiator and the "pop/rock electronic experimentation" of 1999's Guerrilla. The website did take issue with the short length of the record however, suggesting that the Super Furry Animals' music works best "in large doses of pop/rock gem upon pop/rock gem".

In their review of Songbook: The Singles, Vol. 1, Drowned in Sound claimed that "Ice Hockey Hair" "could be the most perfect thing you'll ever set ears upon" while the BBC viewed the "sublime" track as one of the record's highlights. Also reviewing Songbook..., Pitchfork Media called the song a "non-album gem", The Washington Post called it "gorgeous" and AllMusic referred to it as a masterpiece. Reviewing Outspaced, the Melody Maker described the "filthily funky" "Smokin'" as brilliant and Select called it one of the "joyous pinnacles" of the album, suggesting that the track was inspired by P-Funk. The NME however, called "Smokin'" "sludgy" and suggested that it was Outspaced's "fairly naff nadir".

Stylus Magazine named Ice Hockey Hair in a list of "Ten essential singles/EPs" released by Creation Records in a 2003 article about the label. "Ice Hockey Hair" was included in The Pitchfork 500, a list of the greatest songs released from 1977 to 2006, published by Pitchfork Media in 2008.

=== Accolades ===
Publication	Country	Accolade	Year	Rank
John Peel show, BBC Radio 1	United Kingdom	John Peel's Festive 50	1998	29
Melody Maker	United Kingdom	Singles of the year 1998	1998	10
NME	United Kingdom	Single of the week 23 May	1998	–
NME	United Kingdom	Singles of the Year 1998	1998	2
NME	United Kingdom	NME readers singles of the year 1998	1999	4
Select	United Kingdom	Singles of the year 1998	1998	7
Pitchfork Media	United States	The Pitchfork 500	2008	*

* denotes an unordered list

== Music videos ==
=== "Ice Hockey Hair" ===
The music video for "Ice Hockey Hair" features the Super Furry Animals playing along to the track on a rotating dancefloor surrounded by photo booths.

The promotional music video for "Ice Hockey Hair" was directed by Daf Palfrey and appears on the DVD version of the band's 'greatest hits' album Songbook: The Singles, Vol. 1.

The video begins with silent footage of five characters, who appear in a small white rectangle in the centre of the screen against a black background. The text "I am like a film strip ... and like a child ... in a thousand lunar parks ... someone is always ... cranking the handle" appears as the video cuts between shots of each person. "Ice Hockey Hair" begins playing approximately 17 seconds into the video. Each character is again seen in a white rectangle in the centre of the screen followed by a shot of a pair of hands holding a strip of photos of that particular person during which red text is displayed showing the character's name. A woman with short blonde hair and a red top, seen holding her head in her hands is introduced as "The wife"; a bald man with blood on his head is "The husband"; a woman in a white jacket with a blonde mullet hairstyle is "The mistress"; a man with thick-rimmed glasses, a white jacket, and red polo neck sweater is "The voyeur"; and a man in a red and black tracksuit top with a large scar running from his left eye to right cheek is "The stalker". The five characters are all seen singing along to the track individually, again framed in a white rectangle in the centre of the screen. "The wife" is twice shown ripping a photograph of her and "The husband", while "The mistress" is seen sitting on the lap of "The husband" in two shots. After 1 minute and 6 seconds the Super Furry Animals are shown playing along to the track on a rotating dancefloor surrounded by photo booths and several dancers in dark clothes. During an instrumental break in the song, at 1 minute 38 seconds, two masked men are shown playing table tennis on another rotating dancefloor with two large fluorescent purple circles in the background. The five characters are then seen walking around the band and stepping into the photo booths that surround them. The text "Act 1: The kiss" is shown, after which footage of the Super Furry Animals playing along to the track is intercut with shots of the characters. "The husband" and "The mistress" kiss while a strip of photos is seen being passed through a pair of hands and "The voyeur" is shown using a video camera. The characters move to different photo booths and the title "Act 2: The stalking" is displayed. Shots of "The stalker" and "The wife" are then intercut with shots of the band. The characters again change booths and the title "Act 3: The murder" is shown. After quick jump cuts between shots of the band, the masked men playing table tennis and the five characters, "The voyeur" is shown pointing his video camera at the motionless body of "The mistress" which is laid in a bathtub covered in film stock. More footage of the band follows before "The husband" is shown motionless of the floor, surrounded by a white tape outline. The video ends with more jump cuts between the band, the masked table tennis players and the five named characters.

=== "Smokin'" ===
The music video for "Smokin'" features a woman dressed in black with a blonde bob haircut watching over a group of people wearing berets while they make origami animals. In this screenshot the woman piles up the origami creatures while the beret wearers, shown in the foreground, bow their heads.

The music video for "Smokin'" was directed by Peter Gray and also appears on the DVD version of Songbook: The Singles, Vol. 1.

The video begins with a shot of the Super Furry Animals' 'SFA' logo which appears on the cover of the Ice Hockey Hair EP. The logo fades out and the camera pans through a crowd of dark figures wearing berets towards a woman standing behind a long, black table. The woman is wearing a short sleeved black dress and has a blonde bob haircut. Her arms and face are illuminated in the otherwise dark room and she is shown walking backwards down the table, giving coloured cards to each of the figures wearing berets. The woman walks up and down the table observing the crowd as they each use the piece of card they were given to make an origami animal. As each person completes a model animal the woman gives them a new piece of coloured card. Approximately two minutes into the video the woman returns to a central position behind the table and looks down at one of the beret wearers. The camera cuts to show him screwing up a piece of green card into a ball which turns into an origami crane and flies away as he opens his hands. The rest of the figures in berets are shown from behind, bowing their heads before the camera cuts to a close up view of several origami animals on the table. These animals also begin to move, and interact with each other until a large red animal arrives. The camera cuts to a close-up of the red animal's head with smoke shown coming from its nose. The next shot shows the origami animals stationary on the table as the camera pans up to the beret wearers who are looking straight ahead while smoke moves across from the right. The woman walks up and down the table giving the beret wearers new pieces of card as they complete more and more origami animals. As the video draws to an end she rapidly piles up the origami animals into a heap in the middle of the table. When all the animals have been collected into the pile the beret wearers bow their heads and the woman puts her arms around the pile and smiles at the camera. In the final shot the woman places her hands on the table and stares at the camera as the video fades out to show the same Super Furry Animals' 'SFA' logo which appeared at the very beginning.

== Track listing ==
All songs by Super Furry Animals unless otherwise stated.

- CD (CRESCD 288)
1. "Smokin'" (Michael Rose/Derrick Simpson) – 5:05
2. "Ice Hockey Hair" – 6:57
3. "Mu-Tron" – 3:15
4. "Let's Quit Smoking" – 1:48
- 12" (CRE 288 T)
1. "Smokin'" (Rose/Simpson) – 5:05
2. "Mu-Tron" – 3:15
3. "Let's Quit Smoking" – 1:48
4. "Ice Hockey Hair" – 6:57

- 7" (CRE 288), MC (CRECS 288)
1. "Ice Hockey Hair" – 6:57
2. "Smokin'" (Rose/Simpson) – 5:05

== Personnel ==
Band

- Gruff Rhys – vocals
- Huw Bunford – guitar, backing vocals
- Guto Pryce – bass guitar
- Cian Ciaran – keyboards, backing vocals
- Dafydd Ieuan – drums, backing vocals

Artwork

- Pete Fowler – illustration
- Simon Corkin – design

== Singles chart position ==
Chart	Peak position
UK Singles Chart	12
