= Fuzzy Logic (Super Furry Animals album) =

Studio album by Super Furry Animals
- Released: 20 May 1996
- Recorded: 1996
- Studios: Rockfield (Rockfield, Wales)
- Genres: Art rock; Britpop; glam rock; psychedelia; punk rock
- Length: 41:47
- Label: Creation
- Producers: Gorwel Owen; Super Furry Animals

Super Furry Animals chronology
Moog Droog (1995)	Fuzzy Logic (1996)	Radiator (1997)

Singles from Fuzzy Logic
- 1. "Hometown Unicorn" Released: 26 February 1996; 2. "God! Show Me Magic" Released: 29 April 1996; 3. "Something 4 the Weekend" Released: 1 July 1996; 4. "If You Don't Want Me to Destroy You" Released: 30 September 1996

Fuzzy Logic is the debut studio album by the Welsh rock band Super Furry Animals. Recorded at Rockfield Studios in Wales, and released on the Creation label in May 1996, it was positively received by critics, who felt it was an eclectic if inconsistent mix of psychedelic music and glam rock, and was included in Q Magazine's list of recordings of the year. It has retained a modest respect among some critics; it was listed in Q's "Best British Albums Ever" in July 2004, and is included in the book 1001 Albums You Must Hear Before You Die. It contains two top 20 hits in "If You Don't Want Me to Destroy You" and "Something 4 the Weekend"; it also contains the singles "God! Show Me Magic" and "Hometown Unicorn". It reached number 23 in the UK Albums Chart on release. In 2013, NME ranked it at number 245 in its list of the 500 Greatest Albums of All Time.

== Recording ==
In a 2008 interview with Uncut Gruff Rhys described the process of making the album:

We'd signed a deal and we were sort of blagging a bit ... We'd heard about Rockfield Studios and we wanted to record there because they had jacuzzis and you got three meals a day, all the wrong reasons for going to a studio.

Although the album was conceived as a reaction to Britpop which the band felt represented a "conservative backwards movement in music" they soon realised that they were in an "old 70's studio making [a] 70's rock album". Former members Rhys Ifans and Dic Ben contributed to the track "Long Gone" by leaving an answerphone message which plays as the song comes to a close.

The album cover is a montage of photos of Welsh drug smuggler Howard Marks, the subject of the song "Hangin' with Howard Marks". Marks visited Rockfield during the making of the album at the band's request.

== Reception ==
Professional ratings
Review scores
Source	Rating
AllMusic	4.5/5 stars
Alternative Press	5/5
The Guardian	3/5 stars
Mojo	4/5 stars
NME	8/10
Pitchfork	8.4/10
Q	4/5 stars
Rolling Stone	4/5 stars
The Rolling Stone Album Guide	3/5 stars
Uncut	9/10

Reviewing Fuzzy Logic in 1996 for NME, Simon Williams commented that debut albums "rarely come as multi-layered, as lovingly-manipulated as this". A rave review in Alternative Press praised the album as "the stuff of which fearless dreams are forged". Jon Wiederhorn of Rolling Stone felt it was "rich in hallucinogenic spirit and shimmering guitars" and invoked the spirit of early 1970s pop music. James Delingpole in a January 1997 review in The Daily Telegraph wrote the band had produced a "strange mix of Bowie-esque glam rock, school-of-Syd-Barrett psychedelia and DIY kitsch", which resulted in a "delightfully skewed" album. Stephen Thomas Erlewine of AllMusic later commented that on Fuzzy Logic, the band combined psychedelia and art rock with pop melodies in an "intoxicating" manner, and that despite not being fully cohesive as an album, "the individual pleasures of each song become more apparent with each listen". Fuzzy Logic was named the third best album of 1996 by Melody Maker and fourth best by NME. The album was also included in Q magazine's list of recordings of the year.

Fuzzy Logic reached number 23 in the UK Albums Chart on release.

== Legacy ==
In a June 2005 Pitchfork review of the 2005 reissue, Marc Hogan felt the album was a good introduction to the band's "candy-factory chameleon act" with music styles including "synth-laced punk-pop", "slanted pop" and "Pipers-era Floyd", despite its inconsistency. Rod Stanley in the 2005 book 1001 Albums You Must Hear Before You Die felt that the band would go on to record better albums, but that the inventiveness of the album's blend of "Sixties pop, punk rock, and psychedelia, with an underlying Nineties dance sensibility", made it both joyful and exciting. Reviewing the album in 2016, Uncut's John Lewis wrote that its "quizzical" lyrics and influences from "1970s guilty pleasures" set Super Furry Animals apart from their contemporaries in the 1990s Britpop scene.

In 1999, critic Ned Raggett ranked Fuzzy Logic at number 74 on his list of "The Top 136 or So Albums of the Nineties" for Freaky Trigger. Fuzzy Logic was listed at number 42 in Q's 2004 list of the "50 Best British Albums Ever". In 2017, Pitchfork ranked the album at number 27 on its list of the 50 best Britpop albums. In 2013, NME ranked it at number 245 in its list of the 500 Greatest Albums of All Time.

== Track listing ==
All tracks are written by Super Furry Animals.

Disc 1: 2016 Remaster
No.	Title	Length
1.	"God! Show Me Magic"	1:50
2.	"Fuzzy Birds"	2:28
3.	"Something 4 the Weekend" (On the original 1996 UK album, the faster paced "Something for the Weekend" was here)	2:53
4.	"Frisbee"	2:22
5.	"Hometown Unicorn"	3:33
6.	"Gathering Moss"	3:22
7.	"If You Don't Want Me to Destroy You"	3:17
8.	"Bad Behaviour"	4:26
9.	"Mario Man"	4:08
10.	"Hangin' with Howard Marks"	4:20
11.	"Long Gone"	5:20
12.	"For Now and Ever"	3:33

Disc 2: B-Sides & Such
No.	Title	Length
13.	"Lazy Life (of No Fixed Identity)"
14.	"Don't Be a Fool, Billy!"
15.	"Death by Melody"
16.	"Something for the Weekend" (original UK album version)
17.	"Dim Bendith"
18.	"Waiting to Happen"
19.	"Arnofio/Glô in the Dark"
20.	"Guacamole"
21.	"The Man Don't Give a Fuck"
22.	"(Nid) Hon Yw'r Gân Sy'n Mynd I Achub Yr Iaith"

Disc 3: Lost on the Bypass Road (Demo Sessions)
No.	Title	Length
1.	"Frisbee" (demo)
2.	"Something for the Weekend" (demo)
3.	"Hangin' with Howard Marks" (demo)
4.	"Sali Mali" (demo)
5.	"Bad Behaviour" (demo)
6.	"Lazy Life (of No Fixed Identity)" (demo)
7.	"Mario Man" (demo)
8.	"Death By Melody" (demo)
9.	"Hometown Unicorn" (demo)
10.	"Waiting to Happen" (demo)
11.	"If You Don't Want Me to Destroy You" (demo)
12.	"Gathering Moss" (demo)
13.	"The Man Don't Give a Fuck" (demo)
14.	"Fuzzy Birds" (demo)
15.	"For Now and Ever" (demo)
16.	"Frisbee" (live at Phoenix Festival)
17.	"Organ Yn Dy Geg" (live at Phoenix Festival)
18.	"Fix Idris" (live at Phoenix Festival)
19.	"Something 4 the Weekend" (live at Phoenix Festival)
20.	"Hometown Unicorn" (live at Phoenix Festival)
21.	"If You Don't Want Me to Destroy You" (live at Phoenix Festival)
22.	"Focus Pocus/Debiel" (live at Phoenix Festival)
23.	"Bad Behaviour" (live at Phoenix Festival)
24.	"Mario Man" (live at Phoenix Festival)
25.	"God! Show Me Magic" (live at Phoenix Festival)

- The 1996 US release replaced "Something for the Weekend" with the slower paced single version known as "Something 4 the Weekend".

== Personnel ==
Super Furry Animals

- Gruff Rhys – vocals, guitars, analogues, claps
- Dafydd Ieuan – drums, percussion, vocals, piano, claps
- Cian Ciaran – keyboards, analogues, vocals, claps
- Guto Pryce – bass, Hammond, vocals, claps, analogues
- Huw Bunford – guitars, vocals, e-bow, cello, claps

Additional musicians

- Gorwel Owen – piano, Hammond, Rhodes
- Jez Francis – piano on "God! Show Me Magic"
- Matthew Everett – violin
- Chris Williams – violin
- Helen Spargo – viola
- Catherine Tanner – cello
- Martin Smith – trumpet, tenor horn
- Simon James – saxophone, flute
- Andrew Frizell – saxophone, recorder, trombone
- Lindsay Higgs – balalaika
- Rhys Ifans & Dic Ben – answering machine message on "Long Gone"

Technical personnel

- SFA – songs, production
- Gorwel Owen – production
- Andy Wilkinson – engineering
- Nick Brine – assistance
- Brian Cannon @ Microdot – design, art direction
- Toby Egelnick – inside design, layout
