= Howard Marks =

Welsh author and drug smuggler (1945–2016)

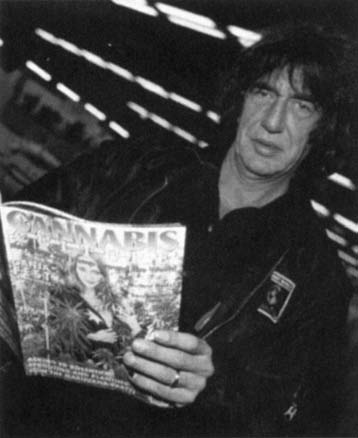
- Marks in Germany in 2000
- Born: Dennis Howard Marks; 13 August 1945; Kenfig Hill, Glamorgan, Wales
- Died: 10 April 2016 (aged 70); Leeds, West Yorkshire, England
- Other names: Mr Nice, Narco Polo, Dennis Howard Marks (D. H. Marks), Hooward Marks, Albi, Mr Tetley, Not, Mr McCarhy and 41526-004 all
- Occupation: Writer
- Spouse(s): Ilze Kadegis (1967–??) Judy Lane (m. 1980–2005)
- Children: 4, including Amber
- Convictions: Racketeering (drug trafficking)
- Penalty: Imprisoned for 7 years

Dennis Howard Marks (13 August 1945 – 10 April 2016) was a Welsh drug smuggler and author who achieved notoriety as an international cannabis smuggler through high-profile court cases.

At his peak he claimed to have been smuggling consignments of the drug as large as 30 tons, and was connected with groups as diverse as the CIA, the IRA, MI6, and the Mafia. He was eventually charged by the US Drug Enforcement Administration, convicted and given a 25-year prison sentence; he was released in April 1995 after serving seven years. Though he had up to 43 aliases, he became known as "Mr Nice" after he bought a passport from convicted murderer Donald Nice. After his release from prison, he published a best-selling autobiography, Mr Nice (1996), and campaigned publicly for changes in drugs legislation.

== Early life and education ==
Marks was born in Kenfig Hill, near Bridgend, Wales, the son of Dennis Marks, a captain in the Merchant Navy, and Edna, a teacher. Brought up as a Baptist, he later turned to Buddhism, though he did not become a devout follower. He attended Garw Grammar School in Pontycymer. He was a fluent Welsh speaker.

He gained a place at Balliol College, Oxford, after he impressed Russell Meiggs in his interview, and read physics there from 1964 to 1967. At the university he was first introduced to cannabis by Denys Irving. After his friend Joshua Macmillan (son of Maurice Macmillan) died, Marks swore off ever getting involved with hard drugs. Among his other friends at Oxford were the epidemiologist Julian Peto and the journalist Lynn Barber. Through a mixture of cheating and last minute cramming, he passed his finals; this was despite months of taking drugs rather than attending classes and a serious infection he developed a few weeks before the exams.

In 1967 he began teacher training, and married Ilze Kadegis, a Latvian student at St. Anne's College, Oxford, who was also training to become a teacher. He gave up teacher training to continue his education at the University of London (1967–68; Grad. Inst P.), then back to Balliol College, Oxford (1968–69; Dip HPh Sc), and then on to the University of Sussex (1969–70) to study philosophy of science.

Marks's daughter, Amber Marks, is a barrister and pharmacology expert.

== Drug empire ==
Though involved with drugs at university, he sold cannabis only to his friends or acquaintances until 1970, when he was persuaded to assist Graham Plinston, who had been arrested in Germany on drug trafficking charges. Through Plinston he met Mohammed Durrani, a Pakistani hashish exporter who was a descendant of the Durranis who had run Afghanistan in the 19th century. With Plinston behind bars, Durrani offered Marks the opportunity to sell the drug on a large scale in London, and he agreed to the proposition. He formed a four-way partnership with Charlie Radcliffe, Charlie Weatherly and a dealer named Jarvis. Durrani never contacted them, and so the group acquired smaller quantities of hashish from various sources and began selling the drug in Oxford, Brighton and London. After six months he returned to Germany to help bail Plinston out of jail. Marks was a useful means of transferring money as he did not have a criminal record.

Now a free man, Plinston gave Marks a job transporting hashish in Frankfurt; Marks in turn hired a New Zealand smuggler named Lang as his driver. After paying Marks £5,000 for his work in Frankfurt, Plinston then sold hashish to Marks and his three friends (Radcliffe, Weatherly and Jarvis) in London; in selling 650 kg (1,430 lb) within a week, the four men made a profit of £20,000. Durrani then arranged for hashish to be smuggled in the furniture of Pakistani diplomats who were moving to London; Marks would then intercept the furniture to find the drugs – this arrangement netted him a profit of £7,500. Marks expanded his enterprise, employing two friends from Wales, Mike Bell and David Thomas, to stash the drugs and help with transportation. The gang became dissatisfied with the way the profits were being split (80% of the money they made went to Durrani) and contacted James McCann, a gunrunner for the Provisional Irish Republican Army (IRA). Marks and Plinston persuaded McCann to smuggle hashish into Ireland from Kabul, which the pair would then ferry over to Wales and into England; McCann would get the drugs into Ireland through the freeport at Shannon Airport using his IRA connections. Marks avoided the attention of HM Revenue and Customs by creating a paper trail that indicated he made his money from selling stamps and dresses.

By 1972, he was making £50,000 with each shipment. By the end of the year he was approached by Hamilton McMillan of the Secret Intelligence Service (MI6), a friend from Oxford University, who recruited Marks to work for MI6 because of his connections in the hashish-producing countries of Lebanon, Pakistan and Afghanistan, for his ability to seduce women, and for his contacts with the IRA. The next year, Marks began exporting cannabis to the United States to The Brotherhood of Eternal Love, hiding the drugs in the music equipment of fictional British pop groups that were supposed to be touring the country; he further expanded his operations with other smugglers and other methods of trafficking, often using his Oxford connections. As McCann was in danger of being executed by the IRA should MI6 tip them off about his involvement in drugs, Marks then gave up the smuggling operation at Shannon airport.

Following the Littlejohn affair, MI6 ceased their relationship with Marks, while his American operation came to an end after police opened a speaker full of cannabis and arrested gang member James Gater, leading to other arrests in Europe. Marks was arrested by Dutch police in 1973, but skipped bail in April 1974; the British press then made him a nationally known figure, reporting that he was feared abducted by the IRA for his connections with MI6. With most of his fortune confiscated by the authorities, he made his way to Italy, where he lived in a Winnebago for three months before returning to England in secret in October 1974. At this point he began a relationship with Judy Lane; the couple married in 1980 and had three children together. He had previously been in a five-year relationship with Rosie Lewis, with whom he had a daughter.

Marks then connected Ernie Combs, member of The Brotherhood of Eternal Love, with John Denbigh, a man with connections in the hashish-producing nation of Nepal. With the help of the yakuza, large quantities of the drug would be exported to John F. Kennedy International Airport in the guise of air conditioning equipment, where Don Brown's mob (headed by Carmine Galante) would then take possession of the drugs. A 500 kg (1,100 lb) deal was set up and executed on 4 July 1975, leaving Marks a wealthy man. Other deals up to 750 kg (1,650 lb) followed, and Marks continued to live under assumed names in the United Kingdom. In 1976 he travelled to America, and set up a 1,000 kg (2,200 lb) deal between Combs and 'Lebanese Sam' – making himself £300,000 in the process; he continued to regularly set up deals between his various American and Far East connections. In need of a new identity after his alias of Anthony Tunnicliffe was compromised in a police sting, in 1978 he bought Donald Nice's passport.

Between 1975 and 1978, twenty-four loads totalling 25 tonnes (55,000 pounds) of marijuana and hashish had been successfully imported through John F. Kennedy Airport, New York. They had involved the Mafia, the yakuza, the Brotherhood of Eternal Love, the Thai army, the Palestine Liberation Organization, the Pakistani Armed Forces, Nepalese monks, and other individuals from all walks of life. The total profit made by all concerned was $48,000,000. They'd had a good run.

— Marks concluding the JFK episode of drug trafficking in his Mr Nice autobiography; the run had ended after the Drug Enforcement Administration (DEA) began intercepting the drugs and arresting Mafia associates in New York.

In the late 1970s, the Trafficante crime family, under the leadership of Santo Trafficante, Jr., were importing Colombian cannabis into the US on freighter ships, thus driving down the price of the drug on the streets in America. In December 1979, Trafficante exported 50 tons of cannabis direct from Colombia to Marks and his contacts in the UK, enough to supply the entire British market for the drug for almost a year. In 1980, Marks was arrested by customs officers for his part in importing £15 million of cannabis; police had followed associates of the Trafficante family to a large stash of cannabis. When arrested, he was in possession of numerous pieces of incriminating evidence, as well as £30,000 in cash. Defended by Lord Hutchinson, Marks pleaded "not guilty", concocting a story that he was an agent for MI6 (concealing the fact that his relation with MI6 ended in 1973) and the Mexican Secret Service that had set up an identity as a drug smuggler in order to close the net on James McCann (wanted in Britain for his IRA activities). The jury found him not guilty of drug smuggling but guilty of using false passports, and Marks was sentenced to two years imprisonment, but was released after five days having already served most of this time before sentence was passed. HM Customs then arrested him for his part of a 1973 smuggling operation but following a plea bargain and time off for remission he served just three months of a three-year sentence.

Released in May 1982, though with most of his employees still in prison for the crime of which Marks had been acquitted, he spent the next year running a legitimate wine importing business but he continued to spend more money than he was making and the savings he made from drug smuggling in the 1970s began to dwindle. In 1983, McCann was still at large and his smuggling enterprise was flourishing; he offered Marks the chance to sell 250 kg (550 lb) of cannabis and Marks accepted. Dutch police confiscated the full shipment and arrested Mickey Williams, a member of the London underworld who had agreed to help Marks on the deal. Marks then travelled to the Far East to set up cannabis deals with Salim Malik, a Pakistani hashish exporter who he had met through Durrani (Durrani had since suffered a fatal heart attack) and Phil Sparrowhawk, an exporter from Bangkok; they would smuggle their product over to Ernie Combs in America. He also arranged a 500 kg (1,100 lb) deal with Mickey Williams, who had travelled to Bangkok after his release from prison in Amsterdam. Marks laundered his money through various fronts: a travel agency, a paper mill, a wine importers, a bulk water transportation company and a secretarial service.

In 1984, he was approached to sell $300,000 worth of cannabis to a Central Intelligence Agency (CIA) agent looking to fund and arm the Mujahideen in their war against the Soviet occupation (Operation Cyclone). The agent's contact on the APL ship suffered a heart attack and died on the journey to the US, leaving the drugs in the hands of US officials; the agent subsequently fled to Brazil to avoid prosecution. Though under surveillance, Marks continued to expand his underworld operations and set up a massage parlour in a Bangkok hotel with the help of Phil Sparrowhawk and Lord Moynihan. In 1986, he settled in Mallorca, and continued to make vast sums smuggling Salim Malik's hashish into America. The DEA were meanwhile tapping Marks's phones and keeping him under surveillance and having arrested Ernie Combs they came close to busting a large shipment of cannabis, when Marks was tipped off; the ship was redirected to Mauritius and the operation aborted. As he continued to avoid DEA stings he continued to make millions and continued to add to his underworld contacts, finding that he could use Chinese triads to launder his drug money more effectively.

A Philippine-brothel-owning member of the House of Lords [Moynihan] was staying at the house of a Spanish Chief Inspector of Police [Rafael Llofriu]. The Lord was being watched by an American CIA operative who was staying at the house of an English convicted sex offender [Jim Hobbs]. The CIA operative was sharing accommodation with an IRA terrorist [McCann]. The IRA terrorist was discussing a Moroccan hashish deal with a Georgian pilot of Colombia's Medellín Cartel. Organising these scenarios was an ex-MI6 agent [Marks], currently supervising the sale of thirty tons of Thai cannabis in Canada and at whose house could be found Pakistan's major supplier of hashish [Malik]. Attempting to understand the scenarios was a solitary DEA agent. The stage was set for something.

— The DEA's efforts to apprehend Marks were made extremely difficult thanks to the many wide-ranging contacts Marks had; in September 1987 many of these contacts were with Marks in Palma.

When friends of his were busted by the Royal Canadian Mounted Police, Marks decided to retire from drug smuggling to concentrate on his legitimate businesses; citing the fate of his friends and contacts, who were either in jail, informing the DEA, or smuggling heavier drugs. In 1988, DEA agent Craig Lovato arrested both Howard and Judy Marks and extradited the couple to the United States. Arrests of those involved in Marks's various criminal activities were made in Britain, Spain, the Philippines, Thailand, the Netherlands, Pakistan, Switzerland, the United States and Canada. This was the work of 'Operation Eclectic', set up in 1986 by both the DEA and Scotland Yard and aided by numerous other law enforcement organisations around the world.

== Trial and imprisonment ==
Marks was taken from Palma to Modelo Prison in Barcelona, and then to Alcalá Meco Prison in Madrid. There he was handed a 40-page document which detailed the allegations of his drug smuggling activities between 1970 and 1987, charging him with operating a racket as described in the RICO act. In his autobiography, Marks stated that "although the charge against Judy and some others were absurd, the formal accusations against me, in general terms, were true." The recently passed Sentencing Reform Act meant that he was facing a minimum of ten years to a maximum life sentence without the possibility for parole. The Audiencia Nacional ordered his extradition to Florida.

After being shown the prosecution evidence against him, Marks attempted to construct the defence that his smuggling operations were directed to Australia and that he never exported to the United States, and therefore never broke US law. He again cultivated the myth that he was a spy for MI6, and claimed that he was set up by the CIA because he had discovered that CIA agents were smuggling drugs into Australia. He and his lawyers spent hours reviewing the phone tapping evidence to make the coded conversations about smuggling into America seem to suggest that the drugs were actually being smuggled into Australia; research was done into weather patterns to prove tentative links between what was said by Marks and his associates and what was happening at the time in Australia. Marks and his wife were extradited in 1989, and he was given the Miranda rights on the flight from Spain to the US.

In Florida, Judy pleaded guilty to her small part in the racket and was released, having already served some months in prison in Spain. The money Marks made from his smuggling operations was spent on legal fees. He refused to plea-bargain or to inform on his associates, gambling that he could again convince a jury that the authorities had got the wrong man. As the trial began in July 1990, Patrick Lane, his brother-in-law and fellow smuggler, wrote to Marks to inform him that he was going to testify against Marks in court to get a more lenient sentence himself. Marks still was confident of beating the DEA in court, but Ernie Combs also agreed to testify for the prosecution so as to secure the release of his wife, and Marks had little choice but to change his plea to guilty to racketeering charges. He was sentenced to 25 years in jail and given a $50,000 fine; though he had originally been sentenced to 15 years he was taken back into court after the judge realised he had misspoken and said that his 10 and 15-year sentences were to run consecutively and not, as he had originally stated, concurrently.

He spent seven years imprisoned in the Federal Correctional Complex, Terre Haute, Indiana, a rough prison. He had originally been sentenced to Butner, but agent Lovato insisted that he instead serve time at Terre Haute. One of the six most secure prisons in the country, Terre Haute had the worst reputation of the six for gang rape and violence. Despite this, Marks remained on good terms with the many violent inmates housed there as he was "British and a famous non-rat" and avoided conflict "by being nice, charming, and eccentric". During his time there he befriended many notorious criminals and members of four of the reputed Five Families, including: Gennaro "Gerry Lang" Langella (Colombo crime family); James "Jimmy C" Coonan, John "Johnny Carnegs" Carneglia, and Frank "Frankie Loc" LoCascio (Gambino crime family); Anthony "Bruno" Indelicato (Bonanno crime family); and Vittorio "Little Vic" Amuso, and Joey Testa (Lucchese crime family). He also made friends with Veronza Bowers, Jr. (Black Panther Party) and James "Big Jim" Nolan of the Outlaws Motorcycle Club.

Owing to his status as an Oxford University graduate with alleged connections to the British Secret Intelligence Service he was treated as a potential escapee and spent many weeks in solitary confinement, though he never attempted to escape or threatened other prisoners or prison staff. During his time in prison he found success as a jailhouse lawyer for the other inmates, securing one overturned conviction. He gave up cigarettes for the last three years of his sentence. In January 1995, Marks was granted parole after a prison officer testified that he was a model prisoner who spent much of his time helping his fellow prisoners pass their GED exams. He was released in April 1995.

== Life after release ==
=== Acting ===
He acted in the gangster film Killer Bitch (2010), starred in the film I Know You Know (2009), appeared as Satan in the 2006 movie adaptation of the Dirty Sanchez television series, and had a cameo appearance in the film Human Traffic (1999). He appeared as himself in AmStarDam (aka "Stoner Express") (2016).

=== Advocacy and politics ===
Marks stood for election to the UK Parliament in 1997, on the single issue of the legalisation of cannabis. He contested four seats at once—Norwich South (against future Home Secretary Charles Clarke), Norwich North, Neath and Southampton Test—and picked up around 1% of the vote. This led to the formation of the Legalise Cannabis Alliance (LCA) by Alun Buffry in 1999; the party reformed as Cannabis Law Reform in 2011.

He also argued for the legalisation of cannabis in numerous television programmes in the United Kingdom. On 1 October 2010, he was interviewed on Ireland's The Late Late Show. The Dutch Cannabis Seedbank Sensi Seeds dedicated their strain Mr Nice G13 x Hash Plant to Marks for his advocacy work.

His close links to the likes of Gruff Rhys led to Marks being associated with the radical changes of the Cool Cymru movement and the changing face of modern Wales.

=== Books ===
Following his release from prison, Marks published an autobiography, Mr Nice (1996), which has been translated into several languages. He also compiled an anthology called The Howard Marks Book of Dope Stories (2001) and a follow-on from his autobiography: Señor Nice: Straight Life From Wales to South America (2006). Señor Nice differs from his previous book as drugs are not central to the story and, while autobiographical, the book is more Marks's own exploration of his claimed ancestor, the pirate Sir Henry Morgan. In 2011, he penned the thriller Sympathy for the Devil. His final book "Mr Smiley, My Last Pill and Testament" ISBN 978-1-5098-0968-4 was published in 2015 by Pan Macmillan.

Marks held a series of book-readings into 2014. In these live events he regaled his audiences with tales of his smuggling days and his time in prison, as well as offered insight into drug production and the arguments for legalisation of cannabis.

=== Comedy ===
He was booked to perform at the Welsh Comedy Festival in July 2007.

=== Comics and videogame ===
Marks and comic writer Pat Mills collaborated on comic strips which tied in with Sony's inFamous 2 video game.

=== Music ===
In the music world, he appeared as a guest on the BBC music quiz show Never Mind the Buzzcocks. He also collaborated with Welsh group Super Furry Animals on their album Fuzzy Logic (released May 1996), which features a track entitled "Hangin' With Howard Marks". The cover for the album featured a montage of photos of Marks. He also worked on their singles "The Man Don't Give a Fuck" and "Ice Hockey Hair". He featured on the album Angel Headed Hip Hop (2009) with Lee Harris and River Styx. He also worked with former Happy Mondays guitarist Kav Sandhu, and appeared at numerous British music festivals, including: (Glastonbury 2009 and 2011), Beautiful Days, RockNess, Camp Bestival, Kendal Calling, and the Sonisphere Festival. He was featured on the Reverend & The Makers track "MDMAzing" on their third album @Reverend Makers (2012).

== Works about Marks ==
Marks was the subject of the biography High Time (1984) written by David Leigh.

Marks was also the subject of the film Mr Nice (2010), named after his 1997 autobiography. The film featured Rhys Ifans as Marks and Chloë Sevigny as his wife Judy.

In 2013, Marks recounted his story in an episode of the television series Banged Up Abroad.

In November 2024, the BBC released a two part two hour documentary about Marks titled Hunting Mr Nice: The Cannabis Kingpin.

== Death ==
On 25 January 2015, it was announced that Marks had inoperable colorectal cancer. He died of the disease on 10 April 2016, at the age of 70.

== Bibliography ==
- Mr Nice. Secker and Warburg 1996 ISBN 0-436-20305-7
- Howard Marks' Book of Dope Stories. Vintage. 2001. ISBN 0-09-942855-5.
- Señor Nice: Straight Life from Wales to South America. Harvill Secker. 2006. ISBN 0-436-21015-0.
- Two Dragons. Lolfa. 2010. ISBN 978-1847712905.
- Sympathy for the Devil. Harvill Secker. 2011. ISBN 978-0-09-953273-6.
- Mr Smiley my last pill and testament. Pan Macmillan. 2015. ISBN 978-1-5098-0968-4.
