= Moog Droog =

EP by Super Furry Animals
- Released: October 1995
- Recorded: 1995
- Genre: Neo-psychedelia
- Length: 15:08
- Label: Ankst
- Producer: Gorwel Owen, Super Furry Animals

Super Furry Animals chronology
Llanfair... (In Space) (1995)	Moog Droog (1995)	Fuzzy Logic (1996)

Professional ratings
Review scores
Source	Rating
AllMusic	3/5 stars

Moog Droog is the second EP by the Super Furry Animals. It was originally released in October 1995 by the Welsh label Ankst Records, and reissued in May 1997. The two releases have different covers: the original version depicts a faceless humanoid brushing dust under a carpet, while the "export" version simply has a red/orange bear drawn on a blue background.

== Title and meanings ==
"Moog Droog" is an ironic anglicised spelling of the Welsh phrase mwg drwg ("bad smoke"), slang for marijuana, making a pun on the Moog synthesizer (and/or its inventor) and the slang word "droog" (based on the Russian for "friend") from A Clockwork Orange. The letter w can be a vowel in Welsh, and in the phrase mwg drwg it is pronounced approximately like the English oo in "zoo" or "too" (although the name "Moog" is more correctly pronounced /moʊɡ/, rhyming with "vogue").

Likewise, the track "pamV" is an anglicised spelling of the Welsh pam fi ("why me"), with the word fi ("me") pronounced like the letter v in English (IPA: [viː]).

"Sali Mali" is the name of a popular Welsh children's character who appears in books and has a series on Welsh television. She runs a cafe in the fictional village Pentre Bach ("small village"). Many Welsh-speaking children (and one assumes members of SFA) learnt to read by reading Sali Mali books.

== Availability ==
Due to their rarity, Moog Droog and the previous EP Llanfair... (In Space) are two of the most sought-after Super Furry Animals releases.

The first and fourth tracks have since been released on the compilation album Out Spaced, and the third track on re-issues of the album Mwng. The second track was later re-recorded for the album Fuzzy Logic and released as a single.

== Track listing ==
No.	Title	Length
1.	"pamV?"	3:57
2.	"God! Show Me Magic"	1:51
3.	"Sali Mali"	4:33
4.	"Focus Pocus/Debiel"	4:46

== Personnel ==
- Gorwel Owen and SFA - cynhyrchu/production
- Placid Casuals - cynllun/design
- David Hann - typographic Design
