= James McCann (drugs trafficker) =

Irish drug & arms trafficker (born 1939)

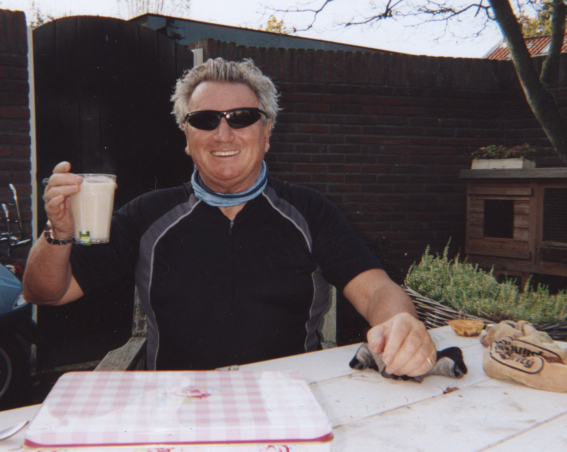
McCann in 2010

James Joseph McCann (born 25 March 1939) is a figure who has been linked with Irish republicanism, drug trafficking and the smuggling of arms to the Provisional IRA in the 1970s.

== Background ==
McCann has dual British and Irish citizenship, and uses an Irish passport. In 1971 he escaped from Belfast's Crumlin Road Prison, where he was awaiting trial for a petrol-bombing at Queen's University.

Prominent drugs trafficker Howard Marks was involved with McCann for several years in smuggling hashish from Afghanistan through Irish ports, specifically Shannon Airport, to the UK via Milford Haven in Wales. He was imprisoned at various times in Germany, France, Canada, Northern Ireland and the Republic of Ireland on drug- or political violence-related matters.

He was described as "possibly the most effective arms supplier" for the IRA in the 1970s. He was arrested in the Republic of Ireland in 1979 on a drugs trafficking charge and held in Portlaoise Prison, but was not convicted.

On 2 March 1991, McCann was arrested in a hotel in Düsseldorf, Germany, under the name of Robert Gustave Baehr. Identified by his fingerprints as James McCann, he was charged with being a member of a criminal gang, with smuggling 1,528 kilograms of hashish from Morocco to England in March 1988, and with possession of two false passports and small quantities of cannabis and cocaine. In December 1992, after 21 months on remand, McCann was found guilty of participating in "a criminal gang whose purpose was to traffic in considerable amounts of narcotics" and of possession of false passports and quantities of cocaine and cannabis. McCann was sentenced to three years for the drugs trafficking charge and six months each on the other charges, six of which were concurrent. As he had already served almost half the 42-month sentence in detention, he was released shortly afterwards and travelled to the Netherlands.

== Cultural depictions ==
McCann was a major character in the 2010 Howard Marks biopic Mr. Nice, where he was played by David Thewlis.
