= If You Don't Want Me to Destroy You =

Single by Super Furry Animals

from the album Fuzzy Logic
- Released: 30 September 1996
- Genre: Alternative rock
- Length: 3:18
- Label: Creation Records
- Songwriter: Super Furry Animals
- Producers: Gorwel Owen, Super Furry Animals

Super Furry Animals singles chronology
| "Something 4 the Weekend" (1996) | "If You Don't Want Me to Destroy You" (1996) | "The Man Don't Give a Fuck" (1996) |

"If You Don't Want Me to Destroy You" is the fourth single, and the last to be taken from the album Fuzzy Logic, by Super Furry Animals. It reached #18 on the UK Singles Chart on its release in September 1996.

The band spent their promotional budget for this single on a tank. The band had the tank painted bright blue and used it to arrive at music festivals. A photograph of the tank is featured on the cover of this single, with the title painted on the tank gun barrel. The tank was later sold to Don Henley.

The packaging of the single features a quote in Welsh, 'Bydded Mae sawl ffordd i gael Wil i'w wely', which roughly translates into English as 'There's more than one way to get Will to bed'.

B-side "(Nid) Hon Yw'r Gân Sy'n Mynd I Achub Yr Iaith" translates in English as "This Is (Not) The Song That Will Save The Welsh Language"

"The Man Don't Give a Fuck" was originally intended to be released as a B-side on the "If You Don't Want Me to Destroy You" single, however Steely Dan frontman Donald Fagen refused to clear a sample of the track "Show Biz Kids" which features prominently on the track and it was replaced by "Guacamole".

== Critical response ==
=== Accolades ===
| Publication | Country | Accolade | Year | Rank |
|---|---|---|---|---|
| NME | United Kingdom | Singles of 1996 | 1996 | 37 |

== Track listing ==
All songs by Super Furry Animals.

- CD (CRESCD243)
  1. "If You Don't Want Me to Destroy You" – 3:18
  2. "Guacamole" – 4:04
  3. "(Nid) Hon Yw'r Gân Sy'n Mynd I Achub Yr Iaith" – 3:54
- Promo CD (CRESCD243P)
  1. "If You Don't Want Me to Destroy You" – 3:18
  2. "The Man Don't Give a Fuck" – 4:46
  3. "(Nid) Hon Yw'r Gân Sy'n Mynd I Achub Yr Iaith" – 3:54

== Personnel ==
- Gruff Rhys – vocals, guitar
- Huw Bunford – guitar, backing vocals
- Guto Pryce – bass guitar
- Cian Ciaran – keyboards, backing vocals
- Dafydd Ieuan – drums
- Matthew Everett – violin
- Chris Williams – violin
- Helen Spargo – viola
- Catherine Tanner – cello

== Singles chart positions ==
| Chart | Peak position |
|---|---|
| UK Singles Chart | 18 |
