= Something 4 the Weekend =

Single by Super Furry Animals

from the album Fuzzy Logic
- Released: 1 July 1996
- Genre: Britpop; pop-punk
- Length: 2:52
- Label: Creation Records
- Songwriter: Super Furry Animals
- Producers: Gorwel Owen, Super Furry Animals

Super Furry Animals singles chronology
"God! Show Me Magic" (1996)	"Something 4 the Weekend" (1996)	"If You Don't Want Me to Destroy You" (1996)

"Something 4 the Weekend" is the third single by Super Furry Animals. The title track is a slower paced, more mellow reworking of the song "Something for the Weekend" from the band's debut album Fuzzy Logic. The original faster paced version is included as the last track on the CD single. It reached #18 on the UK Singles Chart on its release in July 1996. "Something 4 The Weekend" replaces the original album version of the song on the American release of Fuzzy Logic.

The packaging of the single features a quote in Welsh, 'Bydded Ara deg mae dal iâr', which roughly translates into English as 'Slowly is the way to catch a chicken'.

== Track listing ==
All songs by Super Furry Animals.

- CD (CRESCD235)
  1. "Something 4 the Weekend" – 2:52
  2. "Waiting to Happen" – 2:15
  3. "Arnofio/Glô in the Dark" – 3:57
  4. "Something for the Weekend" – 2:32
- Cassette
  1. "Something 4 the Weekend" – 2:52
  2. "Waiting to Happen" – 2:15

== Personnel ==
- Gruff Rhys – vocals, guitar
- Huw Bunford – guitar, backing vocals
- Guto Pryce – bass guitar
- Cian Ciaran – keyboards, backing vocals
- Dafydd Ieuan – drums

== Singles chart positions ==
Chart	Peak position
UK Singles Chart	18
