= The Man Don't Give a Fuck =

1996 single by Super Furry Animals

Single by Super Furry Animals
- Released: 2 December 1996
- Genre: Alternative rock; acid techno
- Length: 4:46
- Label: Creation Records
- Songwriters: Super Furry Animals, Walter Becker, Donald Fagen
- Producer: Gorwel Owen

Super Furry Animals singles chronology
"If You Don't Want Me to Destroy You" (1996)	"The Man Don't Give a Fuck" (1996)	"Hermann ♥'s Pauline" (1997)

"The Man Don't Give a Fuck" is a song by Super Furry Animals, twice released as a single by the group.

It is based around a sample from the Steely Dan song "Show Biz Kids" - "You know they don't give a fuck about anybody else". The sample is repeated more than 50 times, which was claimed to set a record for most appearances of the word "fuck" in a song. In 1999 Insane Clown Posse's "Fuck the World" beat the record with 93 instances, but the 2004 live version of "The Man Don't Give a Fuck" reclaimed it.

The song was originally intended as a B-side for their previous single "If You Don't Want Me to Destroy You" but the group had not been able to clear the sample in time. However, they persevered and when they were able to clear the sample, released the song as a single in its own right. This arguably sealed the song's cult status among SFA fans, and it became the group's standard set-closer when playing live: the outro would often extend to ten or twenty minutes, with keyboard player Cian Ciaran in particular taking the opportunity to improvise wildly around the basic sample. A live version was released in 2004.

In October 2011, NME placed it at number 66 on its list "150 Best Tracks of the Past 15 Years".

== Themes ==
"The Man Don't Give a Fuck" was written by Super Furry Animals as a "multi-compass protest anthem" according to the band's singer and chief lyricist Gruff Rhys. Rhys has claimed that the track does not refer to a particular issue but is about the "mistreatment that we've had at the hands of politicians for years". Rhys has described "The Man Don't Give a Fuck" as a "protest song for our time" which can be used against "any organisation which you feel is terrorising you as an individual, anyone who's cramping your style". On the song's initial single release in 1996, Rhys stated that the track "could be used now to bring down the Government, but in five years time the world could be run by some pilots from Venus, and they will be The Man".

== First release ==
"The Man Don't Give a Fuck" was issued as a single in December 1996, having originally been set for release as a B-side on Super Furry Animals' previous single "If You Don't Want Me to Destroy You". Steely Dan frontman Donald Fagen was upset that a sample of his band's track "Show Biz Kids" featured so prominently on "The Man Don't Give a Fuck", and refused Super Furry Animals' request to use it at the time. Eventually Fagen relented but demanded 95% of the track's proceeds, a situation which Rhys was happy with as he felt the song would never get played due to its frequent use of the swear word 'fuck'.

Asked about the "perverse" decision to release a single containing the word 'fuck' 50 times by a journalist for X-Ray magazine in 2003, Rhys claimed that the band allowed themselves to be manipulated by former label Creation Records who came up with the idea. The group felt that by issuing the track as a single they could "remind people how ridiculous censorship is", with Rhys stating that he didn't think people found 'fuck' to be offensive anymore "unless you're in the church where it's beaten into you that ... swearing is bad".

The single's packaging features a photograph of the footballer Robin Friday showing a V sign to Luton Town goalkeeper Milija Aleksic while playing for Cardiff City. The artwork also features a dedication to the memory of Friday "and his stand against the 'Man'" alongside the Welsh proverb "Stwffiwch y dolig ddim y twrci" which roughly translates into English as "Stuff Christmas not a turkey". The song was recorded and produced by Gorwel Owen at his home studio in Llanfaelog, Anglesey, Wales.

== Second release ==
"The Man Don't Give a Fuck"

Single by Super Furry Animals
- Released: 27 September 2004
- Recorded: Hammersmith Apollo, London
- Genre: Alternative rock
- Length: 23:30
- Label: Sony Records
- Songwriters: Super Furry Animals, Walter Becker, Donald Fagen
- Producer: Super Furry Animals

Super Furry Animals singles chronology
"Hello Sunshine" (2003)	"The Man Don't Give a Fuck" (2004)	"Lazer Beam" (2005)

A live, 23 minute version was released in 2004 as a single with the word 'fuck' mentioned approximately 100 times. It was recorded in London's Hammersmith Apollo. It was printed in a limited edition with an identification number on the back cover.

== Track listing ==
=== First release ===
All songs by (Super Furry Animals/Donald Fagen/Walter Becker)

- CD (CRESCD247), 7" (CRE247)
  1. "The Man Don't Give a Fuck" – 4:46
  2. "The Man Don't Give a Fuck (Howard Marks Mix)" – 6:20
  3. "The Man Don't Give a Fuck (Wishmountain Mix)" – 6:58
- 12" (CRE247T)
  1. "The Man Don't Give a Fuck" – 4:46
  2. "The Man Don't Give a Fuck (Howard Marks Mix)" – 6:20
  3. "The Man Don't Give a Fuck (Wishmountain Mix)" – 6:58
  4. "The Man Don't Give a Fuck (Darren Price Mix)" – 6:02

=== Second release ===
  1. "The Man Don't Give a Fuck (Live)" (Super Furry Animals/Donald Fagen/Walter Becker) – 23:30

== Personnel ==
- Gruff Rhys – vocals, guitar
- Huw Bunford – guitar, backing vocals
- Guto Pryce – bass guitar
- Cian Ciaran – keyboards, backing vocals
- Dafydd Ieuan – drums, percussion, backing vocals
