= Hometown Unicorn =

Single by Super Furry Animals

from the album Fuzzy Logic
- Released: 26 February 1996
- Genre: Noise pop; psychedelia
- Length: 3:33
- Label: Creation Records
- Songwriter: Super Furry Animals
- Producers: Gorwel Owen, Super Furry Animals

Super Furry Animals singles chronology
"Hometown Unicorn" (1996)	"God! Show Me Magic" (1996)

"Hometown Unicorn" is the debut single by Super Furry Animals, released on Alan McGee's Creation Records label on 26 February 1996. It reached #47 in the UK Singles Chart and was voted as "Single of the Week" in NME.

The packaging of the single features a quote in Welsh, 'Bydded goleuni!', which means 'Let there be light!'. This practice of including Welsh quotes was followed by every subsequent SFA single up to, and including, "Demons" in 1997.

"It's about this French teenager called Franck Fontaine who disappeared in 1979, then turned up a week later, claiming he had been abducted by aliens," observed Tim Wheeler of Ash. "Of course, there's always the chance that he went on holiday." A photograph of Fontaine appears on the CD single and on the sleeve of Fuzzy Logic.

== Critical response ==
The track appears in Garry Mulholland's book This Is Uncool, a list of the "500 greatest singles since punk and disco".

== Track listing ==
All songs by Super Furry Animals.

1. "Hometown Unicorn" – 3:35
2. "Lazy Life (Of No Fixed Identity)" – 2:15
3. "Don't Be A Fool, Billy!" – 4:07

== Personnel ==
- Gruff Rhys – vocals, guitar
- Huw Bunford – guitar, backing vocals, cello
- Guto Pryce – bass guitar
- Cian Ciaran – keyboards, backing vocals
- Dafydd Ieuan – drums, backing vocals
