= God! Show Me Magic =

Single by Super Furry Animals

from the album Fuzzy Logic
- Released: 29 April 1996
- Genre: Pop-punk
- Length: 1:49
- Label: Creation Records
- Songwriter: Super Furry Animals
- Producers: Gorwel Owen, Super Furry Animals

Super Furry Animals singles chronology
| "Hometown Unicorn" (1996) | "God! Show Me Magic" (1996) | "Something 4 the Weekend" (1996) |

"God! Show Me Magic" is the second single by Super Furry Animals. It reached No. 33 on the UK Singles Chart on its release in April 1996, the first single by the band to reach the Top 40.

The packaging of the single features a quote in Welsh, 'Gorau chwarae, cyd chwarae', which roughly translates into English as 'It is better to play together', the motto of the Football Association of Wales.

The first version of "God! Show Me Magic" appears on the Moog Droog E.P., released on the Ankst label.

== Critical response ==
=== Accolades ===
| Publication | Country | Accolade | Year | Rank |
|---|---|---|---|---|
| Iguana Music | Spain | Singles of '96 | 1996 | 38 |
| John Peel show, BBC Radio 1 | United Kingdom | John Peel's Festive 50 | 1996 | 49 |
| Vox | United Kingdom | 1996 Singles | 1996 | 15 |

== Track listing ==
All songs by Super Furry Animals.

1. "God! Show Me Magic" – 1:49
2. "Death by Melody" – 2:32
3. "Dim Bendith" – 4:56

== Personnel ==
- Gruff Rhys – vocals, guitar
- Huw Bunford – guitar
- Guto Pryce – bass guitar
- Cian Ciaran – keyboards
- Dafydd Ieuan – drums
- Jez Francis- piano

== Singles chart positions ==
| Chart | Peak position |
|---|---|
| UK Singles Chart | 33 |
