= Glasvegas discography =

- Glasvegas (left to right): Rab Allan, James Allan, Jonna Lofgren and Paul Donoghue
- Studio albums: 4
- Extended plays: 1
- Singles: 20
- Music videos: 7
- Other charted songs: 6

The discography of Glasvegas, a Scottish Indie rock band, consists of four studio albums and eighteen singles. James Allan (vocals and guitar), Rab Allan (guitar), Paul Donoghue (bass) and Jonna Lofgren (drums) formed the band in Glasgow, Scotland in 2003. The band's debut single was the limited edition double A-side single, "I'm Gonna Get Stabbed"/"Ina Lvs Rab", which was released in May 2004. Three further independent singles were released through WaKS and Sane Man, all of which failed to chart. Despite this, "Daddy's Gone", released on Sane Man Recordings, was voted the No.2 single of the year by the NME.

The band signed with Columbia Records in early 2008 and released two further singles – "Geraldine" and "Daddy's Gone" (a re-release of their third single) – which reached numbers sixteen and twelve on the UK Singles Chart respectively. The band's debut album, Glasvegas, was released in September 2008 and reached number 1 on the UK Albums Chart. A mini-Christmas album, A Snowflake Fell (And It Felt Like a Kiss), followed in December 2008, which failed to chart in the UK although it reached number fifty-nine on the Swedish Albums Chart. Euphoric Heartbreak was released on 4 April 2011 and reached No.10 in the UK charts and No.1 in Sweden. The third studio album was released on 2 September 2013. The band's fourth album Godspeed is due to be released in April 2021, with the lead single "Keep Me a Space" released in August 2020.

== Studio albums ==
Title	Details	Peak chart positions										Certifications (sales thresholds)
Title	Details	UK	AUT	BEL	DEN	FRA	IRL	NOR	SWE	SWI	US	Certifications (sales thresholds)
Glasvegas	Released: 8 September 2008; Label: Columbia; Formats: LP, CD, download	2	50	62	25	106	2	23	5	52	126	BPI: Platinum; GLF: Gold
Euphoric Heartbreak	Released: 4 April 2011; Label: Columbia; Formats: LP, CD, download	10	—	98	—	—	46	26	1	41	—	
Later...When the TV Turns to Static	Released: 2 September 2013; Label: BMG; Formats: LP, CD, download, deluxe almanac	41	—	—	—	—	—	—	30	—	—	
Godspeed	Released: 2 April 2021; Label: Go Wow; Formats: LP, CD, download	— (Note: "Godspeed" did not enter the UK Albums Chart, but peaked at number 62 on the UK Albums Sales Chart.)	—	—	—	—	—	—	—	—	—	

== Extended plays ==
Year	Details	Peak chart positions	
Year	Details	UK	SWE
A Snowflake Fell (And It Felt Like a Kiss)	Released: 1 December 2008; Label: Columbia; Formats: CD, download	95	59
Secret Truth	Released: 30 June 2014; Label: BMG; Formats: download	—	—

== Singles ==
Single	Year	Peak chart positions						Album
Single	Year	UK	UK Phys	BEL (FL)	DEN	SCO	SWE	Album
"I'm Gonna Get Stabbed"/"Ina Lvs Rab"	2004	—	—	—	—	—	—	Non-album singles
"Go Square Go!"	2006	—	—	—	—	—	—	Non-album singles
"Daddy's Gone"	2007	—	—	—	—	—	—	Non-album singles
"It's My Own Cheating Heart That Makes Me Cry"	2008	— (Note: "It's My Own Cheating Heart That Makes Me Cry" did not enter the UK Singles Chart, but peaked at number 31 on the UK Independent Singles Chart.)	—	—	—	—	—	Non-album singles
"Geraldine"	2008	16	2	—	36	1	25	Glasvegas
"Daddy's Gone"	2008	12	3	— (Note: "Daddy's Gone" did not enter the Flanders Ultratop 50, but peaked at number 12 on the Ultratip chart.)	—	2	—	Glasvegas
"Please Come Back Home"^{[I]}	2008	76	—	—	—	—	29	A Snowflake Fell (And It Felt Like A Kiss)
"Flowers & Football Tops"	2009	98	4	—	—	1	—	Glasvegas
"Euphoria, Take My Hand"	2011	126	3	—	—	—	—	Euphoric Heartbreak
"Shine Like Stars"^{[II]}	2011	—	—	—	—	—	—	Euphoric Heartbreak
"I'd Rather Be Dead (Than Be with You)"	2013	—	64	—	—	—	—	Later...When the TV Turns to Static
"If"	2013	—	—	—	—	—	—	Later...When the TV Turns to Static
"Later...When the TV Turns to Static"	2013	—	—	—	—	—	—	Later...When the TV Turns to Static
"Keep Me a Space"	2020	—	—	—	—	—	—	Godspeed
"My Body Is a Glasshouse (A Thousand Stones Ago)"	2020	—	—	—	—	—	—	Godspeed
"Dying to Live"	2021	—	—	—	—	—	—	Godspeed
"Shake the Cage (Für Theo)"	2021	—	—	—	—	—	—	Godspeed
"Holiday & Travel Brochure"	2022	—	—	—	—	—	—	Non-album singles
"Beat City" (with The Raveonettes)	2023	—	—	—	—	—	—	The Raveonettes presents: Rip It Off
"Degüello"	2026	—	—	—	—	—	—	Airy Fairy
"—" denotes releases that did not chart.

I The song "Please Come Back Home" was released as a promotional single from the EP "A Snowflake Fell (And It Felt Like A Kiss)".
II The song "Shine Like Stars" was released as a promotional single from the Album "Euphoric Heartbreak".

== Music videos ==
Year	Video	Director
2007	"Daddy's Gone"	
2008	"Geraldine"	Paul Minor
2008	"Daddy's Gone" (Version 2)	Jamie Thraves
2008	"Please Come Back Home"	Goodtimes (James Slater & Kate Sellers)
2009	"Flowers & Football Tops"	Martin de Thurah
2009	"It's My Own Cheating Heart That Makes Me Cry"	Lex Halaby
2011	"Euphoria, Take My Hand"	Jamie Roberts
2013	"I'd Rather Be Dead (Than Be with You)"	James Allan/Robert Hackett
2013	"If"	James Allan/Alex Hardy

== Other charted songs ==
With the A Snowflake Fell (And It Felt Like a Kiss) mini-album being released solely as a bonus CD for the special edition re-release of Glasvegas in the UK, fans who had already bought the album prior to this release had the option to download the EP, resulting in each track charting on the UK Singles Chart.

Year	Title	UK	SWE	Album
2008	"Please Come Back Home"	76	29	A Snowflake Fell (And It Felt Like a Kiss)
2008	"A Snowflake Fell (And It Felt Like a Kiss)"	95	17	A Snowflake Fell (And It Felt Like a Kiss)
2008	"Fuck You It's Over"	106	38	A Snowflake Fell (And It Felt Like a Kiss)
2008	"Silent Night/Noapte de Vis"	109	42	A Snowflake Fell (And It Felt Like a Kiss)
2008	"Cruel Moon"	115	40	A Snowflake Fell (And It Felt Like a Kiss)
2008	"Careful What You Wish For"	121	43	A Snowflake Fell (And It Felt Like a Kiss)
