= 2009 UK Music Video Awards =

- Date: 13 October 2009
- Location: Leicester Square, London
- Hosted by: Adam Buxton
- Website: www.ukmva.com

The 2009 UK Music Video Awards were held on 13 October 2009 at the Odeon West End in Leicester Square, London to recognise the best in music videos and music film making from United Kingdom and worldwide. The nominations were announced on 28 September 2009. British rock band Coldplay won Video of the Year for "Strawberry Swing", directed by Shynola.

== Video of the Year ==
Video of the Year
- Coldplay - "Strawberry Swing"
  (Director: Shynola)

== Special awards ==
The Icon Award	Outstanding Achievement Award
Dawn Shadforth	Carole Burton-Fairbrother

== Video Genre Categories ==
Best Pop Video	Best Rock Video
Will Young – "Changes" (Director: Martin de Thurah): Alesha Dixon — "The Boy Does Nothing"; Beyoncé – "Single Ladies (Put a Ring on It)"; Florence and The Machine – "Drumming Song"; Paolo Nutini – "Candy"; Will Young – "Let It Go"	Coldplay – "Strawberry Swing" (Director: Shynola): Coldplay – "Life in Technicolour II"; Depeche Mode – "Wrong"; Glasvegas – "Flowers & Football Tops"; Oasis – "Falling Down"; The Dead Weather – "Treat Me Like Your Mother"
Best Indie/Alternative Video	Best Dance Video
Department of Eagles – "No One Does It Like You" (Directors: Patrick Daughters, Marcel Dzama): Fever Ray – "When I Grow Up"; Fever Ray – "If I Had a Heart"; Franz Ferdinand – "Ulysses"; Grizzly Bear – "Two Weeks"; Jack Peñate – "Tonight Today"	The Presets – "If I Know You" (Director: Eva Husson): Dizzee Rascal – "Bonkers"; Metronomy – "A Thing For Me"; Rex the Dog – "Bubblicious"; The Prodigy – "Warrior's Dance"; Tiga – "Shoes"
Best Urban Video	Best International Video
Wiley – "Cash in My Pocket" (Director: Kim Gehrig): Kid British – "Our House Is Dadless"; Kid Cudi – "Day 'n' Nite"; Kid Cudi – "Make Her Say"; N-Dubz – "Wouldn't You"; Professor Green – "Upper Clapton Dance"	Lady Gaga – "Paparazzi" (Director: Jonas Åkerlund): Beyoncé – "Diva"; Eminem – "We Made You"; Matt and Kim – "Lessons Learned"; MGMT – "Kids"; Peter, Bjorn & John – "Nothing to Worry About"
Best Budget/Independent Video – Rock, Indie, Alternative	Best Budget/Independent Video – Pop, Dance, Urban
Moray McLaren – "We Got Time" (Director: David Wilson): Archangel – "Do It Again"; Jamie T – "Fire Fire"; Ruarri Joseph – "More Than Most"; Truckers Of Husk – "Person For The Person"; We Have Band – "You Came Out"	Speech Debelle – "The Key" (Director: Anthony Dickenson): Bashy featuring Wretch 32 and Scorcher – "Ransom"; Example – "Hooligans"; Man Like Me – "London Town"; The Candle Thieves – "The Sunshine Song"; Wax Stag – "And How"

== Craft and Technical Categories ==
Best Animation in a Video	Best Art Direction in a Video
Coldplay – "Strawberry Swing" (Animator: Shynola): Birdy Nam Nam – "The Parachute Ending"; Hauschka – "Morgenrot"; Röyksopp – "Happy Up Here"; The Prodigy – "Warrior's Dance"; Tom Fun Orchestra – "Bottom Of The River"	The Kooks – "Sway" (Art Director: Tom Gander): Coldplay – "Life in Technicolor II"; Glasvegas – "Flowers and Football Tops"; Lily Allen – "The Fear"; Mika – "We Are Golden"; Take That – "Up All Night"
Best Cinematography in a Video	Best Editing in a Video
Glasvegas – "Flowers and Football Tops" (DOP: Lasse Frank): Delphic – "This Momentary"; Doves – "Kingdom of Rust"; Oasis – "Falling Down"; Paolo Nutini – "Candy"; Will Young – "Let It Go"	Oasis – "Falling Down" (Editor: Tom Lindsay): Delphic – "This Momentary"; Franz Ferdinand – "No You Girls"; The Prodigy – "Omen"; Tommy Sparks – "I'm A Rope"; We Have Band – "We Came Out"
Best Styling in a Video	Best Telecine in a Video
Florence and The Machine – "Drumming Song" (Stylist: Aldene Johnson): Alesha Dixon — "The Boy Does Nothing"; Florence and The Machine – "Rabbit Heart (Raise It Up)"; Franz Ferdinand – "No You Girls"; La Roux – "Quicksand"; Peaches – "Talk to Me"	Paolo Nutini – "Candy" (TK: Paul Harrison): Delphic – "This Momentary"; Golden Silvers – "Arrows Of Eros"; Just Jack – "The Day I Died"; Kid Cudi – "Make Her Say"; Lily Allen – "22"
Best Visual Effects in a Video	Best Live Music Coverage
Glasvegas – "Flowers and Football Tops" (VFX: Johan Drehn, Martin de Thurah): Coldplay – "Life in Technicolor II"; Depeche Mode – "Wrong"; Miike Snow – "Animal"; Monkey – "Monkey Bee"; The xx – "Basic Space"	McFly – "Radio:Active Live at Wembley" (Director: Paul Caslin): Foo Fighters – "Foo Fighters Live at Wembley Stadium"; Kasabian – "Live T4 Special"; Linkin Park – "Road to Revolution: Live at Milton Keynes"; Madonna – "Sticky & Sweet Tour"; The Prodigy – "Invaders Must Die"
Innovation Award
Oasis – "Dig Out Your Soul" (Director: The Malloys): AC/DC Rocks The Office; Deadmau5 & Kaskade – "I Remember"; Frankmusik – "Live And Lost"; Julian Perretta – "Ride My Star"; Keane – "Live in 3D From Abbey Road"

== Individual and Company Categories ==
Best Director	Best New Director
Martin de Thurah: AlexandLiane; Richard Ayoade; Douglas Hart; Jake Nava; WIZ	David Wilson: Anthony Dickenson; Dave Ma; Emil Nava; Adam Powell; Russell Weekes
Best Producer	Best Commissioner
Malachy McAnenny: Francesca Barnes; Lucy Booth; Tamsin Glasson; Liz Kessler; Phil Tidy	Tim Nash: Ross Anderson; James Hackett; Phil Lee; New Selecta; Mike O’Keefe
