= Earthworm Heart =

Studio album by Tom Fun Orchestra
- Released: November 13, 2012
- Recorded: 2010–2012, Soundpark Studios
- Genre: Indie rock
- Label: Company House Records
- Producers: Jamie Foulds, Tom Fun Orchestra

Tom Fun Orchestra chronology
You Will Land with a Thud (2008)	Earthworm Heart (2012)

Earthworm Heart is the second full-length album recorded by Cape Breton indie rock band Tom Fun Orchestra It was recorded over a period of a few years at Soundpark Studios in Sydney, Nova Scotia. It was produced by Jamie Foulds and the band, engineered by Foulds and Bert Lionais, and mixed and mastered by Foulds.

== Track listing ==
1.Merry Christmas Jim - 5:08
2.Rowing Away - 3:31
3.I Am Bleeding Hallelujah - 3:58
4.Dear Eleanor - 2:59
5.Lungs - 3:43
6.Concussional - 0:53
7.Anchors Aweigh - 4:27
8.Earthworm Heart - 2:36
9.Animal Mask - 4:17
10.Winter Spring - 2:04
11.Boxcar Lullaby - 3:59
12.Sunshine on my Bones - 4:26
13.Ulysses - 3:11
14.Sympathetic Wolf - 6:48

== Personnel ==
=== Tom Fun Orchestra ===
Albert Lionais - Trumpet, Coronet, Vocals
Breagh Potter - Vocals, Acoustic Guitar
Dave Mahalik - Accordion
Ian MacDougall - Lead Vocals, Electric & Acoustic Guitar
Shane O'Handley - Bass guitar, Electric Autoharp, Vocals
Steve Wilton - Drums
Victor Tomiczek - Banjo, Electric Guitar, Vocals

=== Featuring ===
Colin Grant - Violin, String Arrangements
Carmen Townsend - Vocals
Nathan Richards - Electric, Acoustic, and Slide Guitars
Thomas Allen - Drums, Percussion
Zachary MacLean - Electric Guitar, Piano
Jamie Foulds - Synths, Electric Guitar

=== The Flying Horse Singers ===
Alyce MacLean, Alex Abbass, Alex Sheppard,
AJ Fraser, Andrew Grieg, Andrew Lionais, Ashley MacIntyre,
Corey MacMullin, Dinao MacCormick, Harry Doyle, James Walsh
Jenni Welsh, John Gill, Katie Boutllier, Katie LeBlanc, Maria Nemis,
Mike LeLievre, Redmond MacDougall, Stephen MacDougall,
Steven Fifield, Thomas Allen, Tori MacKinnon

=== Production ===
Jamie Foulds - Producer, Engineering, Mixing, Mastering
Albert Lionais - Engineering
Tom Fun Orchestra - Producer
