= The Art of Getting By =

2011 film by Gavin Wiesen

- Theatrical release poster
- Directed by: Gavin Wiesen
- Written by: Gavin Wiesen
- Produced by: P. Jennifer Dana; Gia Walsh; Kara Baker; Darren Goldberg
- Starring: Freddie Highmore; Emma Roberts; Michael Angarano; Elizabeth Reaser; Sam Robards; Rita Wilson; Blair Underwood
- Cinematography: Ben Kutchins
- Edited by: Mollie Goldstein
- Music by: Alec Puro
- Production companies: Mint Pictures; Atlantic Pictures; Gigi Films; Goldcrest Films; Island Bound Productions
- Distributed by: Fox Searchlight Pictures
- Release dates: January 23, 2011 (Sundance); June 17, 2011 (United States)
- Running time: 84 minutes
- Country: United States
- Language: English
- Budget: $4 million
- Box office: $2 million

The Art of Getting By is a 2011 American romantic comedy-drama film written and directed by Gavin Wiesen in his feature directorial debut, and starring Freddie Highmore, Emma Roberts, Michael Angarano, Elizabeth Reaser, Sam Robards, Rita Wilson, and Blair Underwood. The film follows George (Highmore), a lonely high school senior who forms an unlikely bond with a popular classmate, Sally (Roberts).

The film premiered under the title Homework at the Sundance Film Festival on January 23, 2011. It was given a limited theatrical release in the United States on June 17, 2011, by Fox Searchlight Pictures. The film was a box-office flop, grossing $2 million on a $4 million budget, and received unfavorable reviews from critics, who criticized the writing, but Highmore and Roberts were praised for their performances.

== Plot ==
George Zinavoy is a lonely senior at a Manhattan preparatory school with a penchant for drawing and a nihilistic worldview. Obsessed with the inevitability of death, he never does homework and skips school frequently; as a result, he is placed on academic probation. One day while on the school roof, George encounters classmate Sally Howe smoking. When a teacher appears, he pulls out a cigarette and takes the fall for her. They become friends.

On Career Day at school, George meets young artist Dustin Heath, who becomes a mentor of sorts to George. He brings Sally with him to visit Dustin at his studio in Brooklyn and it becomes apparent that Dustin finds her attractive. She invites George to a New Year's Eve party, where she dances with an ex-boyfriend while George gets drunk, goes outside, throws up, and falls asleep on the street. Finding him there, Sally takes him to her place, putting him to bed on a pull-out next to her bed. They grow closer and George becomes more involved in school.

On Valentine's Day, George and Sally go out to dinner, and she starts asking questions about what he thinks of her. He is evasive, and she asks him if he will have sex with her. When George freezes, Sally backtracks and claims she was joking, as she considers him her only real friend. He becomes withdrawn and leaves early. As George continually avoids Sally and ignores her calls, she meets with Dustin at a bar one evening and flirts with him. Though Dustin initially resists Sally's advances out of respect for George, they soon begin a relationship.

After failing to write his English term paper, George is again sent to the principal's office. He is given two choices: be expelled, or make up all of the homework he has not done all year. Confronted by his mother and stepfather at home, he responds by telling his mother that his stepfather has been pretending to go to work for weeks. The stepfather attacks him and George knocks him down before taking off. He goes to Sally's and, in the hallway, kisses her. Sally kisses him back but pulls away, revealing Dustin in her apartment. Devastated, George leaves.

The next morning, George finds his mother in the park and she tells him she is divorcing his stepfather. Consoling her, he begins to rethink his life. He decides to make the effort to do his assignments. His art teacher gives him only one project, which must be honest and fearless. George completes the assignments and takes his final exams. Meanwhile, Sally continues seeing Dustin.

One day, George receives a text message from Sally. They meet and she tells him she is going backpacking with Dustin through Europe and skipping graduation. He tells her he is in love with her and they go back to her apartment, where they kiss. Sally tells him she loves him too and promises they will be together one day.

George turns in all his assignments and the principal tells him he will know he has passed if his name is called at graduation. George's art teacher commends him for his project. While Sally is at the airport with Dustin, George's name is called at graduation as his mother proudly watches from the audience. Afterwards, George is in the art classroom looking at his art project, a portrait of Sally. Having chosen not to go to Europe with Dustin, Sally walks in, and the two look at the painting together.

== Cast ==
- Freddie Highmore as George Zinavoy
- Emma Roberts as Sally Howe
- Michael Angarano as Dustin Heath
- Elizabeth Reaser as Charlotte Howe, Sally's mother
- Sam Robards as Jack Sargent, George's stepfather
- Jarlath Conroy as Harris McElroy
- Ann Dowd as Mrs. Grimes
- Marcus Carl Franklin as Will Sharpe
- Sasha Spielberg as Zoe Rubenstein
- Rita Wilson as Vivian Sargent, George's mother
- Blair Underwood as Principal Bill Martinson
- Alicia Silverstone as Ms. Herman

== Production ==
The film's story is inspired by Gavin Wiesen's childhood growing up in New York and spending summers in East Hampton. Wiesen finished writing the script in 2006 and secured a producer in 2008, with financing for the film taking another year to come together.

The film was shot in New York City in the spring of 2010, wrapping up that April.

== Soundtrack ==
The soundtrack to the film was released on CD on June 14, 2011, by Rhino Records.

Track listing

1. "We Will Become Silhouettes" – The Shins
2. "We Drink on the Job" – Earlimart
3. "Sally's Theme" – Alec Puro
4. "Sleep The Clock Around" – Mates of State
5. "This Momentary" – Delphic
6. "Christmas Break" – Alec Puro
7. "Winter Lady" – Leonard Cohen
8. "The Skin of My Yellow Country Teeth" – Clap Your Hands Say Yeah
9. "Sally's Bedroom" – Alec Puro
10. "Spitting Fire" – The Boxer Rebellion
11. "Here" – Pavement
12. "The Trial of the Century" – French Kicks

== Release ==
The film had its world premiere under the title Homework at the Sundance Film Festival on January 23, 2011. It was given a limited theatrical release in the United States on June 17, 2011, by Fox Searchlight Pictures, followed by a wider release in July. The film was released on Blu-ray on November 29, 2011.

== Reception ==
=== Box office ===
The Art of Getting By grossed $1.4 million in the United States and Canada, and $0.6 million in other territories, for a worldwide total of $2 million, against a production budget of $4 million.

=== Critical response ===
On the review aggregator website Rotten Tomatoes, the film holds an approval rating of 20% based on 110 reviews, with an average rating of 4.3/10. The website's critics consensus reads, "A sitcom-level twee mess that bakes in the typical manic pixie dream girl and boring, withdrawn boy hero." Metacritic, which uses a weighted average, assigned the film a score of 36 out of 100, based on 28 critics, indicating "generally unfavorable" reviews.

The film was criticized as being "a typical coming of age drama". Criticism also centered on the writing, though actor Freddie Highmore and his co-star Emma Roberts were both praised for their performances. Edward Douglas of ComingSoon.net noted, "A New York City boy-meets-girl story may be something we've seen many times before and often better, but Wiesen brings something unique to the mix."

=== Accolades ===
Year	Award	Category	Nominee(s)	Result
2011	Sundance Film Festival	U.S. Dramatic	The Art of Getting By	Nominated
2011	Teen Choice Awards	Choice Movie Actress: Romantic Comedy	Emma Roberts	Nominated
