= Later...When the TV Turns to Static =

Studio album by Glasvegas
- Released: 2 September 2013
- Studios: Gorbals Studio, Glasgow, Scotland
- Genre: Indie rock
- Length: 44:46
- Label: BMG
- Producer: James Allan

Glasvegas chronology
| Euphoric Heartbreak (2011) | Later...When the TV Turns to Static (2013) | Godspeed (2021) |

Singles from Later...When the TV Turns to Static
- 1. "I'd Rather Be Dead (Than Be with You)" Released: 25 March 2013; 2. "If" Released: 8 July 2013; 3. "Later...When the TV Turns to Static" Released: 21 November 2013

Later...When the TV Turns to Static is the third studio album by Scottish rock band Glasvegas. It was released on 2 September 2013 through BMG. The album was produced by lead singer James Allan. It received generally favourable reviews from critics but stalled at number 41 on the UK Albums Charts. It is the first of the group's studio albums not to reach the Top 10.

Later...When the TV Turns to Static was released in three formats: standard CD, heavyweight white-coloured vinyl LP, and deluxe almanac edition containing the CD, extensive booklet, and a bonus DVD featuring a full-length 'stripped' version of the album and exclusive live performances. Part of the footage contained within the deluxe almanac DVD is still broadcast by Sky Arts.

== Background and recording ==
During their 2011 autumn tour, the band debuted "If" live. They continued to perform and develop songs from the album throughout 2012 with "Later...When the TV Turns to Static", "I'd Rather Be Dead (Than Be with You)" and "All I Want Is My Baby" being among the first to be premiered. During the summer and autumn of 2012, the band went into Gorbals Studio in Glasgow to record the album. A tour was announced in late 2012 called "The Crying Onion" tour, which would see the band continuing to perform new material.

In an interview with Louder Than War prior to the album's release, bass player Paul Donoghue told journalist Katie Clare how "[lead singer] James [Allan] really has a full idea how this album should be, he even co-directed the first video, it was his vision from start to finish, he worked really hard and it gave everything a real continuity. Even the artwork was planned and the deluxe edition will come with a 40 page booklet that was all part of the idea." The album was also produced by lead singer James Allan; guitarist Rab Allan insisted to The Daily Record that, "[the band] knew exactly what we wanted so there was no point in having anyone else but James working on it." James added, "It's really hard to get to that point where you have a record out that you can sit and listen to that you totally adore."

=== Writing ===
Talking about the songs on the album, James Allan said in an interview with The Quietus, "...the songs were about my experiences... and if they weren't about my experiences, they were about my thoughts on things." Allan explained in another interview with The Daily Record that the song "If" is "quite a sympathetic song. It seems a shame the hardest, toughest things seem to define people. It's not the times you hold the medal or wins that do it. The song is a spiritual view on things – without something evil, the kind-hearted man would walk on by, invisible." He went on to explain the inspiration behind the song: "My idea for the song came about during a phone call a while back with my good friend Alan McGee. He was talking to me about something quite difficult that was going on at the time and I said to him, 'Alan, if we didn't go through the bad stuff, we wouldn't recognize the good stuff; it would be invisible to you." Talking about the album's closing track "Finished Sympathy", Allan told The Guardian that "it's about the speed with which we're expected to shed naivety, how people's expectations can be overwhelming. It's like when an infant trips and falls – people rush to pick them up and crowd around them going, 'Are you OK? Are you all right?' But as soon as you're out of that infant stage, when you trip and fall, everybody laughs at you. As you get older, it seems like sympathy is nowhere to be found." Explaining the meaning behind the title track, Allan said, "I guess it's a song that I was writing, kind of about the place between what has just happened, a chapter that has just passed, and moving into the next chapter, the new dawn, that in-between place, where the unknown lies ahead, the mystery lies ahead, and that can be quite scary."

== Reception ==
=== Critical response ===
Professional ratings
Aggregate scores
| Source | Rating |
|---|---|
| Metacritic | 61/100 |
Review scores
| Source | Rating |
| AllMusic | 3.5/5 stars |
| Clash | 3.5/5 stars |
| Drowned in Sound | (5/10) |
| The Independent | 4/5 stars |
| MusicOMH | 3.5/5 stars |
| NME | (6/10) |
| PopMatters | (5/10) |
| The Scotsman | 4/5 stars |
| The Skinny | 2/5 stars |

Later...When the TV Turns to Static received generally favourable reviews from critics. At Metacritic, which assigns a weighted average rating out of 100 to reviews from mainstream critics, the album received an average score of 61 based on 11 reviews. Fiona Shepard at The Scotsman praised Allan's songwriting and singled out the songs "Choices" and "I'd Rather Be Dead (Than Be with You)" as "most impressive". Paul Mardles at The Observer also praised "Choices" and the title track as highlights.

=== Commercial performance ===
Later...When the TV Turns to Static charted at number 41 on the UK Albums Chart on 8 September 2013, selling less than 3,000 copies during its first week of release. This marked a decline in fortunes for the band, whose first two albums charted in the top 10. It had sold only 6,248 copies in the UK as of July 2014. The album debuted at number 30 on the Swedish Album Charts.

== Singles ==
"I'd Rather Be Dead (Than Be with You)" was released as the lead single from the album on 25 March 2013 as a digital download, which featured an acoustic version of "All I Want Is My Baby". The song was later released as a limited edition 7" vinyl single on 22 April 2013 for Record Store Day, which included the album track "Later...When the TV Turns to Static" as a special teaser for the album. "If" was released as the second single from the album on 8 July 2013. Title track "Later...When the TV Turns to Static" was released as the album's third single in November 2013, and "Secret Truth" was released as the fourth and final single in July 2014 as a digital download only.

== Track listing ==
All tracks are written by James Allan.

Later...When the TV Turns to Static track listing
| No. | Title | Length |
|---|---|---|
| 1. | "Later...When the TV Turns to Static" | 5:23 |
| 2. | "Youngblood" | 4:42 |
| 3. | "Choices" | 3:56 |
| 4. | "All I Want Is My Baby" | 2:51 |
| 5. | "Secret Truth" | 3:56 |
| 6. | "I'd Rather Be Dead (Than Be with You)" | 3:11 |
| 7. | "Magazine" | 3:46 |
| 8. | "If" | 4:28 |
| 9. | "Neon Bedroom" | 4:11 |
| 10. | "Finished Sympathy" | 8:22 |
| Total length: | | 44:46 |

Deluxe edition bonus disc
| No. | Title | Length |
|---|---|---|
| 1. | "Neon Bedroom Blues" | 4:08 |
| 2. | "All I Want Is My Baby" (Boden Sessions) | 2:51 |
| 3. | "Secret Truth" (Boden Sessions) | 3:38 |
| 4. | "Youngblood" (Boden Sessions) | 4:21 |
| 5. | "If" (Boden Sessions) | 5:24 |
| 6. | "Magazine" (Boden Sessions) | 3:48 |
| 7. | "No Her, No Hymn" | 2:48 |
| 8. | "Vem Kan Segla Förutan Vind" | 2:50 |

== Personnel ==
Glasvegas

- James Allan - lead vocals
- Rab Allan - guitar
- Paul Donoghue - bass guitar
- Jonna Löfgren – drums

Technical

- Production – James Allan
- Mixing – Andrea Gobbi, Glasvegas
- Engineering – Andrea Gobbi
- Studio assistant – Cameron Malcolm
- Mastering – Guy Davie

== Charts ==
Chart performance for Later...When the TV Turns to Static
| Chart (2013) | Peak position |
|---|---|
| German Albums (Offizielle Top 100) | 96 |
| Swedish Albums (Sverigetopplistan) | 30 |
| UK Albums (Official Charts) | 41 |
