= I'd Rather Be Dead (Than Be with You) =

Single by Glasvegas

from the album Later...When The TV Turns To Static
- B-side: "Later...When The TV Turns To Static"
- Released: 25 March 2013
- Genre: Indie rock
- Length: 3:11 (single version)
- Label: Go Wow Records
- Songwriter: James Allan
- Producer: James Allan

Glasvegas singles chronology
"Shine Like Stars" (2011)	"I'd Rather Be Dead (Than Be with You)" (2013)	"If" (2013)

"I'd Rather Be Dead (Than Be with You)" is a 2013 single by Scottish Indie rock band Glasvegas. It was released on 25 March 2013. It is the first single from their third studio album 'Later...When The TV Turns To Static'. It was written and produced by lead singer James Allan.

== Vinyl ==
The single was released as a limited edition 7" white vinyl on 22 April 2013 for World Record Store Day. The 7" vinyl contained exclusive artwork created by James Allan. The release was also supported by two exclusive in-store performances, one in Edinburgh's Avalanche and the other in Glasgow's Love Music. Guitarist Rab Allan said: "We always like to do something special for our fans whenever we can, and to release a limited edition coloured vinyl for RSD seemed like a great way to celebrate the first release from our new album. James spent weeks creating the 7" record sleeve, and we're all really proud of it."

== Critical reception ==
The single received mixed reviews. Rick Fulton of the Daily Record described the new single as "gorgeous, simple, devastating. An incredible return to form from one of Scotland's truly great storytellers." However, NME writer Nick Levine wrote: "here's a break-up song that makes 'We Are Never Ever Getting Back Together' sound soft. It's basically just piano and hate, and the way James Allan sings 'I'd rather be dead than be with you' could curdle custard."

== Track listing ==
All songs written by James Allan, except where noted.

Download

1. "I'd Rather Be Dead (Than Be With You)" - 3:11
2. "All I Want Is My Baby" (Acoustic) - 2:42

7" Vinyl

1. "I'd Rather Be Dead (Than Be With You)" - 3:11
2. "Later...When The TV Turns To Static" - 5:23

== Release history ==
Region	Date	Format	Label
United Kingdom	25 March 2013	Digital download	Go Wow Records
United Kingdom	22 April 2013	7" Vinyl	Go Wow Records
