= Please Come Back Home =

Single by Glasvegas

from the album A Snowflake Fell (And It Felt Like a Kiss)
- Released: 1 December 2008
- Recorded: Transylvania
- Genre: Indie rock
- Length: 3:29
- Label: Columbia
- Songwriter(s): James Allan
- Producer(s): James Allan

Glasvegas singles chronology
"Daddy's Gone" (2008)	"Please Come Back Home" (2008)	"Flowers & Football Tops" (2009)

"Please Come Back Home" is a 2008 single by Scottish Indie rock band Glasvegas. It was released on 1 December 2008 as a download single. It charted at number 76 on the UK Singles Chart and it also reached number 29 in Sweden.

Prefix Mag awarded "Please Come Back Home" an 8.5 out of 10 rating, and said of the song: "You'll find a sense of longing on just about any Glasvegas track, but it's particularly pronounced, on "Please Come Back Home", a desperate Scottish reversal of the "I'll Be Home for Christmas" motif. The video was filmed in Brașov in Romania while the band recorded their E.P. Anyone who's been dumped around the Holidays will find this devastating."

== Track listing ==
Promo CD (GOWOW015)

1. "Please Come Back Home" – 3:29
2. "Cruel Moon" – 4:36
3. "Silent Night/Noapte de Vis" – 3:01

== Charts ==
Chart (2008)	Peak position
UK Singles Chart	76
Swedish Singles Chart	29
