= Euphoric Heartbreak =

Studio album by Glasvegas
- Released: 4 April 2011
- Recorded: 2010–11; Santa Monica, California, US
- Genre: Indie rock
- Length: 49:44
- Label: Columbia
- Producers: Flood, James Allan

Glasvegas chronology
A Snowflake Fell (and It Felt Like a Kiss) (2008)	Euphoric Heartbreak (2011)	Later...When the TV Turns to Static (2013)

Singles from Euphoric Heartbreak
- 1. "Euphoria, Take My Hand" Released: 28 March 2011; 2. "Shine Like Stars" Released: 27 June 2011 (promo only)

Professional ratings
Aggregate scores
Source	Rating
Metacritic	58/100
Review scores
Source	Rating
AllMusic	3/5 stars
BBC Music	(positive)
Clash	9/10
The Daily Telegraph	4/5 stars
Drowned in Sound	7/10
The Evening Standard	4/5 stars
The Guardian	3/5 stars
NME	9/10
Pitchfork	4.1/10
The Scotsman	3/5 stars

Euphoric Heartbreak (stylised as EUPHORIC /// HEARTBREAK \\\) is the second studio album by Scottish rock group Glasvegas, which was released on 4 April 2011 by Columbia Records. It reached No. 10 in the UK and No. 1 in Sweden. The album was written, demoed and tracked by James Allan in a luxury beach house in Santa Monica, California before full production and final recording took place in London and Glasgow. The album was produced by Flood and mixed by Claudius Mittendorfer. The song "The World is Yours" features on EA Sports' FIFA 12. As of July 2014, the album had sold 30,400 units in the UK, which is ten per cent of the sales of their platinum-selling debut album.

== Pre-release ==
After recording was finished Glasvegas opened 2011 with an 8 date tour of Scotland which took the band to places in Scotland that are normally missed out by touring bands. The tour took in Kirkwall, Wick, Forres, Oban, Dunoon, Troon, Hawick and Dunfermline. The band announced these intimate dates to ensure that Scotland would be the first to hear the new music. The tour received positive critical reviews with Simon Price of The Independent on Sunday quoting that "Glasvegas are still – and we desperately need this right now – a band to believe in". The band also announced a showcase tour planned around smaller venues in March 2011 with several dates selling out within hours of going on sale followed by an academy size tour planned for April/May 2011 to promote the new album.

Columbia Records were extremely pleased with the quality of songs delivered by the band and the fact it was a marked departure from the debut album. The marketing campaign kicked off alongside the tour in January 2011 with a free track giveaway and the track chosen was the second track on the album "The World Is Yours". However the band wanted something more substantial than just a free giveaway and the label eventually agreed to creating an "Album Trailer Movie" as well.

== Release and reception ==
Glasvegas's second album Euphoric Heartbreak was released on 4 April 2011 reaching No.10 in the UK and No.1 in Sweden. The album polarised opinion, some reviews criticised the band for being too bold and that the album was too big a departure from their debut whilst others praised this move forward and the high quality songwriting the album contained. Initial reviews of the album were generally positive with the Daily Record declaring it "the album of the year!" NME gave the album 9/10, and wrote that; "Turning pain into joy is the stuff that dreams are made of for an album as thrillingly ambitious as it is enigmatic". Clash magazine praised the band for delivering a more accomplished sound by reassuringly admitting "pioneers they remain". The BBC declared the album "a triumph" despite all the upheaval with the band in 2010.

However, the album garnered negative opinions such as Pitchfork, who felt the album was "too bombastic and that it simply numbs you with 50 minutes of novocaine for the soul." While PopMatters gave the album 5/10 and said that the "album smears together into one gigantic well-produced stadium anthem, shining like the night sky while remaining just as inert". The Guardian awarded the album 3/5 but felt "they were still waiting on an undeniable triumph from Glasvegas" Furthermore, The Independent gave the album 2/5, saying it was "insubstantial" and that "as with bad acting, it's not persuasive enough to make one care."

On 16 September 2011 it was announced that the band's song "The World Is Yours" (the second listed track) from Euphoric Heartbreak would be featured on the soundtrack in EA Sports football game, FIFA 12.

A free download of "The World Is Yours" was made available on Glasvegas' official website on 16 January 2011. It was also revealed that the opening track "Pain Pain, Never Again" is a spoken word piece, and likewise the final track "Change" features James Allan's mother performing a small spoken word piece. According to James Allan, the forward and backward slashes contained in the album title represent "the ascent, the crest of a wave, and then the crash." I Feel Wrong (Homosexuality Pt:1) and Stronger Than Dirt (Homosexuality Pt:2) were also key tracks on the album.

== Singles ==
The band released their first official single from the album, "Euphoria, Take My Hand" on 28 March 2011. The single included two exclusive b-sides: "Georgia, Walk With Me" and "7 AM Eternally".

== Artwork ==
The US release of the album features a photo of Allan's mother on the cover instead of Marilyn Monroe.

== Track listing ==
All tracks are written by James Allan.

Euphoric Heartbreak track listing
No.	Title	Length
1.	"Pain Pain, Never Again"	2:59
2.	"The World Is Yours"	4:53
3.	"You"	4:29
4.	"Shine Like Stars"	3:36
5.	"Whatever Hurts You Through the Night"	4:38
6.	"Stronger Than Dirt (Homosexuality Pt. 2)"	3:46
7.	"Dream Dream Dreaming"	5:17
8.	"I Feel Wrong (Homosexuality Pt. 1)"	5:08
9.	"Euphoria, Take My Hand"	4:33
10.	"Lots Sometimes"	7:11
11.	"Change"	3:13

iTunes edition bonus track
No.	Title	Length
12.	"Euphoria, Take My Hand" (Santa Monica demo)	5:51

== Personnel ==
- James Allan – vocals, drums
- Rab Allan – guitars
- Paul Donaghue – bass

Note: While drummer Jonna Löfgren is listed as a member of the band, Glasvegas recorded the album as a trio prior to her joining with drums credited to Echo, which was a pseudonym for James Allan.

== Charts ==
Chart performance for Euphoric Heartbreak
Chart (2011)	Peak position
Belgian Albums (Ultratop Flanders)	98
Finnish Albums (Suomen virallinen lista)	48
German Albums (Offizielle Top 100)	69
Irish Albums (IRMA)	46
Norwegian Albums (VG-lista)	26
Spanish Albums (Promusicae)	100
Swedish Albums (Sverigetopplistan)	1
Swiss Albums (Schweizer Hitparade)	41
UK Albums (Official Charts)	10
