= Acolyte (album) =

Studio album by Delphic
- Released: 11 January 2010
- Recorded: Berlin, Germany
- Genre: Alternative dance, dream pop, electronic rock, indie rock
- Length: 51:42
- Label: Polydor, Dangerbird, Modular
- Producer: Ewan Pearson

Delphic chronology
Acolyte (2010)	Collections (2013)

Singles from Acolyte
- 1. "Counterpoint" Released: 13 April 2009; 2. "This Momentary" Released: 31 August 2009; 3. "Doubt" Released: 4 January 2010; 4. "Halcyon" Released: 15 March 2010; 5. "Counterpoint (re-release)" Released: 31 May 2010

Professional ratings
Review scores
Source	Rating
AllMusic	3.5/5 stars
Clash	(7/10)
Drowned in Sound	(8/10)
The Guardian	4/5 stars
NME	(8/10)
Pitchfork	(5.0/10)
Q	4/5 stars
Rock Sound	(7/10)
The Times	5/5 stars

Acolyte is the debut studio album by the English alternative dance band Delphic, released by Polydor Records on 11 January 2010. It was recorded mostly in Ewan Pearson's Berlin studio. The album was released in Australia and New Zealand on 22 January via Modular and in the United States on 29 June 2010 by Dangerbird Records.

== Track listing ==
No.	Title	Length
1.	"Clarion Call"	2:56
2.	"Doubt"	4:06
3.	"This Momentary"	4:35
4.	"Red Lights"	6:11
5.	"Acolyte"	8:51
6.	"Halcyon"	4:43
7.	"Submission"	5:33
8.	"Counterpoint"	6:18
9.	"Ephemera"	1:56
10.	"Remain"	6:33
Total length:		51:42

Japan edition bonus tracks
No.	Title	Length
11.	"Sanctuary"	4:42
12.	"Alterstate"	4:10
Total length:		60:42

== Singles ==
The band released the tracks Counterpoint and This Momentary on 13 April 2009 and 31 August 2009 respectively prior to the completion of the album. This Momentary later became available as a free digital download on iTunes to help promote the album.

The first single to be released from the album was "Doubt" and was released on 4 January 2010, a week prior to the release of the album. The single entered the UK Singles Chart at number 79, the most successful song from the band yet. Its B-Side was Sanctuary.

"Halcyon" is the second single from the album, released on 15 March 2010. The single reached a peak of number 143 on the UK Singles Chart marking the band's second most successful single to date. Its B-Side was "Wake". The song was featured nationwide on the new 2010 advert for the Samsung Monte mobile phone. The music video that accompanies the single features the band dressed in hooded black robes, standing on top of a mound of slates. A woman dances in the wind, whilst the drummer plays on branches and stones. Shots of wool also feature heavily throughout the video.

The third single to be released from the album was Counterpoint and acted as a re-release of the single. It was released on 31 May 2010, although it was the Tim Goldsworthy Remix that received the radio airplay. The single failed to make an impact on the UK Singles Chart.

== Charts ==
=== Weekly charts ===
Chart (2010)	Peak position
Australian Albums (ARIA Charts)	66
Belgian Albums (Ultratop Wallonia)	90
French Albums (SNEP)	151
Irish Albums (IRMA)	64
Scottish Albums (OCC)	17
UK Albums (OCC)	8

=== Year-end charts ===
Chart (2010)	Position
UK Albums (OCC)	192

== Personnel ==
- All Tracks Written By – Delphic
- Drums By – Dan Hadley
- Published By – Universal Music Publishing, Ltd.
- Produced By – Delphic and Ewan Pearson
- Mixed By – Ewan Pearson and Bruno Ellingham
- Photo Images By – Non-Format and Jake Walters
- Art Direction and Design By – Non-Format
- Dangerbird A+R – Jeff Castelaz and Peter Walker
