= Godspeed (Glasvegas album) =

Studio album by Glasvegas
- Released: 2 April 2021
- Studios: Glasgow, Scotland
- Length: 38:07
- Label: Go Wow
- Producer: James Allan

Glasvegas chronology
| Later...When the TV Turns to Static (2013) | Godspeed (2021) | Airy Fairy (2027) |

Singles from Godspeed
- 1. "Keep Me a Space" Released: 14 August 2020; 2. "My Body Is a Glasshouse (A Thousand Stones Ago)" Released: 4 December 2020; 3. "Dying to Live" Released: 29 January 2021; 4. "Shake the Cage (für Theo)" Released: 19 March 2021

Professional ratings
Review scores
| Source | Rating |
|---|---|
| The Arts Desk | 3/5 stars |
| The Scotsman | 4/5 stars |

Godspeed is the fourth studio album by Scottish rock band Glasvegas. The album was released across all digital platforms on 2 April 2021 through Go Wow Records, with the CD version of the album released on 20 August 2021 and the vinyl LP version to follow in January 2022. Godspeed is the band's first new studio album in eight years, following 2013's Later...When the TV Turns to Static and the departure of drummer Jonna Löfgren. The album was written, recorded, engineered and produced by lead singer James Allan.

The album cover is from a photo taken on the Lower East Side of Manhattan in New York City by James Allan's friend, Angela McCluskey. The boy in the photo is blind and is being healed by the man in the wheelchair with his father behind him. The musical theme of the album "takes place" across the course of one evening.

== Singles ==
"Keep Me a Space" was released as the lead single from the album on 14 August 2020 as a digital download and across all digital platforms. This marked the band's first new release in seven years.

"My Body Is a Glasshouse (A Thousand Stones Ago)" was released across all digital platforms on 4 December 2020 as the second single from the album.

"Dying to Live" was released across all digital platforms on 29 January 2021 as the third single from the album.

"Shake the Cage (für Theo)" was released across all digital platforms on 19 March 2021 as the fourth single from the album. The song was featured at the end of the Alan McGee biopic Creation Stories and was the only new contemporary music featured on the movie soundtrack.

== Track listing ==
All tracks are written by James Allan except "Parked Car (Interior)" written by Bernard Hermann.

Godspeed track listing
| No. | Title | Length |
|---|---|---|
| 1. | "Parked Car (Exterior)" | 0:41 |
| 2. | "Dive" | 3:43 |
| 3. | "Dying to Live" | 3:44 |
| 4. | "Shake the Cage (für Theo)" | 4:56 |
| 5. | "Keep Me a Space" | 4:17 |
| 6. | "Parked Car (Interior)" | 0:33 |
| 7. | "Cupid's Dark Disco" | 3:26 |
| 8. | "My Body Is a Glasshouse (A Thousand Stones Ago)" | 4:13 |
| 9. | "In My Mirror" | 4:22 |
| 10. | "Stay Lit" | 3:42 |
| 11. | "Godspeed" | 4:30 |
| Total length: | | 38:07 |

== Charts ==
Chart performance for Godspeed
| Chart (2021–2022) | Peak position |
|---|---|
| Scottish Albums (Official Charts) | 14 |
| UK Independent Albums (Official Charts) | 30 |
