= If (Glasvegas song) =

Single by Glasvegas

from the album Later...When The TV Turns To Static
- Released: 8 July 2013
- Genre: Indie rock
- Length: 4:29 (single version)
- Label: BMG
- Songwriter(s): James Allan
- Producer(s): James Allan

Glasvegas singles chronology
"I'd Rather Be Dead (Than Be With You)" (2013)	"If" (2013)

"If" is a 2013 single by Scottish Indie rock band Glasvegas. It was released on 8 July 2013. It is the second single from their third studio album Later...When The TV Turns To Static. It was written and produced by lead singer James Allan.

== Critical reception ==
On release, the single was met with good reviews. Nick Levine of NME says that "'If' is grand, ragged round the edges, and wiser than you’ll ever be." He goes on to say "Welcome back to ‘brilliant’." Mickey McMonagle of the Daily Record says "this song has grown into a phenomenal piece of music." He then goes on to say "it’s destined to be a huge favourite live and MUST be a single." He concluded "Unmistakably Glasvegas at their very best."

== Music video ==
A music video to accompany the release of "If" was first released onto YouTube on 8 July 2013. The video features William Shatner and is Glasvegas’ take on The Old Grey Whistle Test. "We played on the Late Show with Craig Ferguson in LA a couple of years ago and William Shatner introduced us as he is a fan of the band," Allan said. "We thought it would be a cool thing to add in for the new video since it also has a ‘late show’ theme.

"It’s a simple live performance by the band with an abstract part in the middle where it looks like the video has been taped over with random visuals. The video has a filter that we wanted to put on it just to make it look even more like you were watching a recording on VCR. Old school!"

== Songs ==
- "If" was premiered live in 2011 and has been played since in following tours. Allan explains "Quite a sympathetic song. It seems a shame the hardest, toughest things seem to define people. It’s not the times you hold the medal or wins that do it. The song is a spiritual view on things – without something evil, the kind-hearted man would walk on by, invisible." James Allan states, "My idea for the song came about during a phone call a while back with my good friend Alan McGee. He was talking to me about something quite difficult that was going on at the time and I said to him, 'Alan, if we didn't go through the bad stuff, we wouldn't recognize the good stuff; it would be invisible to you."
- "Press <PLAY>" is a brand new song written especially for the EP by James Allan. "A lot of thought went into the 'If EP' from the decision about the cover track right down to the wee <> symbols in the ‘Press title, which I wanted to make look like a button on a VCR. I sometimes mess around with letters and symbols and stuff."
- "The Words That Maketh Murder" – "The reason for choosing ‘The Words That Maketh Murder' was that some of the covers we have done in the past have been older songs, so we wanted to go for something newer. The PJ Harvey album ‘Let England Shake’ is a record we had been listening to and it seemed an obvious choice to pick a song from this record."
- "Finished Sympathy" – "the demo of 'Finished Sympathy', well it’s a bloody good song from the album that we are really proud of, based on my opinion that “sympathy” is something that's finished at too young an age. You can expect heavy fireworks from the album version."

== Track listing ==
All songs written by James Allan, except where noted.

Download

1. "If" – 3:41
2. "Press <PLAY>" - 4:54
3. "The Words That Maketh Murder" (PJ Harvey cover, written by Polly Jean Harvey) - 3:41
4. "Finished Sympathy" (Demo) - 4:58

== Release history ==
Region	Date	Format	Label
United Kingdom	8 July 2013	Digital download	BMG
