= A Snowflake Fell (and It Felt Like a Kiss) =

EP by Glasvegas
- Released: 1 December 2008
- Recorded: New York; Braşov, Transylvania
- Genres: Indie rock, Christmas music
- Length: 22:02
- Label: Columbia
- Producers: James Allan, Rich Costey

Glasvegas chronology
Glasvegas (2008)	A Snowflake Fell (and It Felt Like a Kiss) (2008)	EUPHORIC /// HEARTBREAK \\\ (2011)

Professional ratings
Aggregate scores
Source	Rating
Metacritic	77/100 link
Review scores
Source	Rating
Drowned in Sound	(6/10) link
The Guardian	link
NME	(8/10) link
The Times	link
Uncut	link

A Snowflake Fell (and It Felt Like a Kiss) is a Christmas-themed EP by the Scottish indie rock band Glasvegas, released on 1 December 2008 via Columbia Records.

== Recording, mixing & mastering ==
The album was recorded in the United States and Romania over twelve days in October 2008. The band spent one week recording with Rich Costey, who they had previously worked with earlier in the year on their eponymous debut studio album, Glasvegas. The band then flew to Transylvania where they spent a further week recording in a Citadel which they converted into a small recording studio. The Concentus Choir, featured on the track "Silent Night/Noapte de Vis," was recorded at St. Nicholas Church in Braşov.

== Release and reception ==
A Snowflake Fell (and It Felt Like a Kiss) was released as a limited edition standalone CD and as part of a special edition double CD with the band's debut album Glasvegas, featured in a small box with fold-out poster, and separately as a digital download. The album has reached number 59 on the Swedish Albums Chart. The song "A Snowflake Fell (and It Felt Like a Kiss)" has reached number 17 on the Swedish Singles Chart and number 95 on the UK Singles Chart. "Please Come Back Home" has also reached number 76 on the UK Singles Chart.

== Track listing ==
All tracks are written by James Allan (except "Silent Night" written by Josef Mohr and Franz Gruber).

No.	Title	Length
1.	"Careful What You Wish For"	1:49
2.	"Fuck You, It's Over"	4:44
3.	"Cruel Moon"	4:36
4.	"Please Come Back Home"	3:29
5.	"A Snowflake Fell (and It Felt Like a Kiss)"	4:23
6.	"Silent Night/Noapte de Vis"	3:01
