= Doubt (Delphic song) =

- CD Cover

Single by Delphic

from the album Acolyte
- B-side: "Sanctuary"
- Released: 18 January 2010
- Genre: Electronic rock, indie rock
- Label: Polydor
- Songwriter(s): Richard Boardman, Matt Cocksedge, James Cook
- Producer(s): Ewan Pearson

Delphic singles chronology
"This Momentary" (2009)	"Doubt" (2010)	"Halcyon" (2010)

7" Cover
- 7" Picture Disc Cover

12" Cover
- Limited Edition Blue 12" Cover

"Doubt" is the second single from alternative dance band, Delphic to be released from their debut album Acolyte. The single was released in the United Kingdom on 18 January 2010, where it debuted at number 79 on the UK Singles Chart.

== Release ==
The single "Doubt" was released in multiple formats, including a CD, a digital download, a 7" vinyl and a 12" vinyl. Both the cover of the 7" and 12" differ from that of the original. The 12" was also a Blue Remix Vinyl and was limited to only 300 copies.

"Doubt" was selected as Single of the Week on Australia's iTunes, which ran from 26 January until 2 February.

Doubt was also issued as a promo cd single by Chimeric Records under exclusive license to Polydor Ltd (UK) in 2009.

== Music video ==
The music video for Doubt is very heavily computer generated. It features topless people sitting down in a plain room, whilst several computer-generated images move across their bodies.

== Track listing ==
CD Single + 7" Vinyl
No.	Title	Length
1.	"Doubt"	4:07
2.	"Sanctuary"	4:40

12" Vinyl
No.	Title	Length
1.	"Doubt" (Riton Rerub)
2.	"Doubt" (Riton Rerub Instrumental)

Digital download
No.	Title	Length
1.	"Doubt"	4:07
2.	"Sanctuary"	4:40
3.	"Doubt" (Riton Rerub)	4:44

Promo CD
No.	Title	Length
1.	"Doubt (Original)"	4:08
2.	"Doubt (Riton Vox)"	4:52
3.	"Doubt (Riton Instrumental)"	4:51
4.	"Doubt (Doc Daneeka Remix)"	4:58
5.	"Doubt (Ramadanman Remix)"	5:06
6.	"Doubt (Kyle Hall Remix)"	6:10

== Chart performance ==
Chart (2009)	Peak position
UK Singles (The Official Charts Company)	79
