= Glasvegas (album) =

Studio album by Glasvegas
- Released: 8 September 2008
- Recorded: Brooklyn Recording Studios, New York, United States; Glasgow, Scotland
- Genres: Indie rock, noise pop
- Length: 41:47
- Label: Columbia
- Producers: James Allan, Rich Costey

Glasvegas chronology
Glasvegas (2008)	A Snowflake Fell (and It Felt Like a Kiss) (2008)

Singles from Glasvegas
- 1. "Geraldine" Released: 23 June 2008; 2. "Daddy's Gone" Released: 25 August 2008; 3. "Flowers & Football Tops" Released: 23 February 2009

Glasvegas is the debut studio album by the Scottish indie rock band Glasvegas, first released in the UK on 8 September 2008 by Columbia Records. The album was produced by lead singer James Allan and Rich Costey (Muse, Franz Ferdinand). The album sold 56,000 copies in its first week of release and reached number 2 on the UK Albums Chart. The album was nominated for Best International Album at the 2008 Swedish Rockbjörnen awards, Best Album at the 2009 NME Awards and the 2009 Mercury Prize. On 25 September 2009 the album was certified Platinum by the BPI, and it has sold over 300,000 copies in the UK.

== Reception ==
Professional ratings
Aggregate scores
Source	Rating
Metacritic	74/100
Review scores
Source	Rating
AllMusic	3.5/5 stars
The A.V. Club	C+
The Guardian	4/5 stars
Mojo	4/5 stars
MSN Music (Consumer Guide)	A
NME	9/10
Pitchfork	6.0/10
Q	4/5 stars
Rolling Stone	3.5/5 stars
Spin	4/5 stars

The album was released to generally favourable reviews, garnering an average score of 74 out of 100 at aggregator website Metacritic. Observer Music Monthly says that "these hard-nosed softies are unique and this, make no mistake, is their Definitely Maybe, the quintessential noise-pop set of the modern age." Dot Music gave the album a glowing review, calling it "a gut punch of a debut, and one that makes you believe Glasvegas are one of those rare, rare bands who might just have that perfect record in them." Likewise, the NME exclaimed, "So believe it: this is the real thing, no-one's crying wolf, not even Alan McGee." Rolling Stone found that on the album "Glasvegas create wall-of-distortion melodrama that draws on The Jesus and Mary Chain, Sixties girl groups and The Velvet Underground's rain-dance pulse. It makes for a compelling blend of grays--lit by singer James Allan's high, bright hurrahs." Spin proclaimed: "Glasgow quartet Glasvegas are a product of this world--frontman James Allan is even a former professional footballer--and their remarkable debut gives voice to its fears, frustrations, and heartaches without succumbing to its clichés." Music critic Robert Christgau gave the album an A grade in his February 2009 MSN Consumer Guide column, describing the band as "too good to be true."

In a mixed review, The New York Times remarked that "Glasvegas is determinedly provincial, insisting there is grandeur in everyday lives. But what sounds rousing in Britain can sound sodden and overwrought to American ears." The Guardian concluded that "there are definitely failings and shortcomings on display here, but they're substantially outweighed by moments when Glasvegas hit their target with a force that makes you believe they might well survive the more outrageous claims being made on their behalf."

== Track listing ==
All tracks written by James Allan, except where noted. ("Flowers & Football Tops" contains elements from the song "You Are My Sunshine" by Mitchell/Davis, and "Stabbed" uses the music of Ludwig van Beethoven's "Moonlight" Sonata as a backdrop to spoken word)

1. "Flowers & Football Tops" – 6:56
2. "Geraldine" – 3:45
3. "It's My Own Cheating Heart That Makes Me Cry" – 4:25
4. "Lonesome Swan" – 2:43
5. "Go Square Go" – 3:22
6. "Polmont on My Mind" – 3:50
7. "Daddy's Gone" – 4:22
8. "Stabbed" – 2:20
9. "S.A.D. Light" – 3:59
10. "Ice Cream Van" – 5:56

US bonus tracks

11. "The Prettiest Thing on Saltcoats Beach" – 6:24
12. "Everybody's Got to Learn Sometime" (written by James Warren; originally by The Korgis) – 4:53

Japan bonus tracks

11. "The Prettiest Thing on Saltcoats Beach" – 6:24
12. "A Little Thing Called 'Fear'" – 3:43

=== Limited edition ===
The album was also released in the UK as a limited edition CD/DVD set. The DVD features the band performing live at The ABC in Glasgow on 20 June 2008, as well as a solo acoustic performance of "Flowers & Football Tops," two music videos, and a hidden interview.

1. "Flowers & Football Tops" (live in Glasgow) – 5:55
2. "It's My Own Cheating Heart That Makes Me Cry" (live in Glasgow) – 4:11
3. "Geraldine" (live in Glasgow) – 3:24
4. "Go Square Go" (live in Glasgow) – 3:17
5. "Daddy's Gone" (live in Glasgow) – 4:27
6. "Flowers & Football Tops" (live acoustic) – 3:51
7. "Geraldine" (video) – 4:06
8. "Daddy's Gone" (video) – 4:25
9. (Hidden interview with James and Caroline) – 6:38

== Song use in other media ==
The song "Daddy's Gone" featured in the episode "Chuck Versus the Dream Job" from the television show Chuck. The instrumental version of "Geraldine" has been used extensively worldwide (and predominately) for sports programmes. In 2008, the instrumental of "Geraldine" was also used in the UK trailer for The Damned United which was a fictionalised version of Brian Clough's tenure as manager of Leeds United. The full version of the song was featured in the documentary One Night in Turin, which chronicled England's run in the 1990 FIFA World Cup. "It's My Own Cheating Heart That Makes Me Cry" is heard at the end of "Emily and Katie", an episode in the third series of Skins.

== Accolades ==
Publication	Country	Accolade	Year	Rank
The Guardian	UK	Best Albums of the Year	2008	#8
Q	UK	Best Albums of the Year	2008	#5
The Observer Music Monthly	UK	Best Albums of the Year	2008	#4
NME	UK	Best Albums of the Year	2008	#3
MOJO	UK	Best Albums of the Year	2008	#7
The Fly	UK	Best Albums of the Year	2008	#9

== Artwork ==
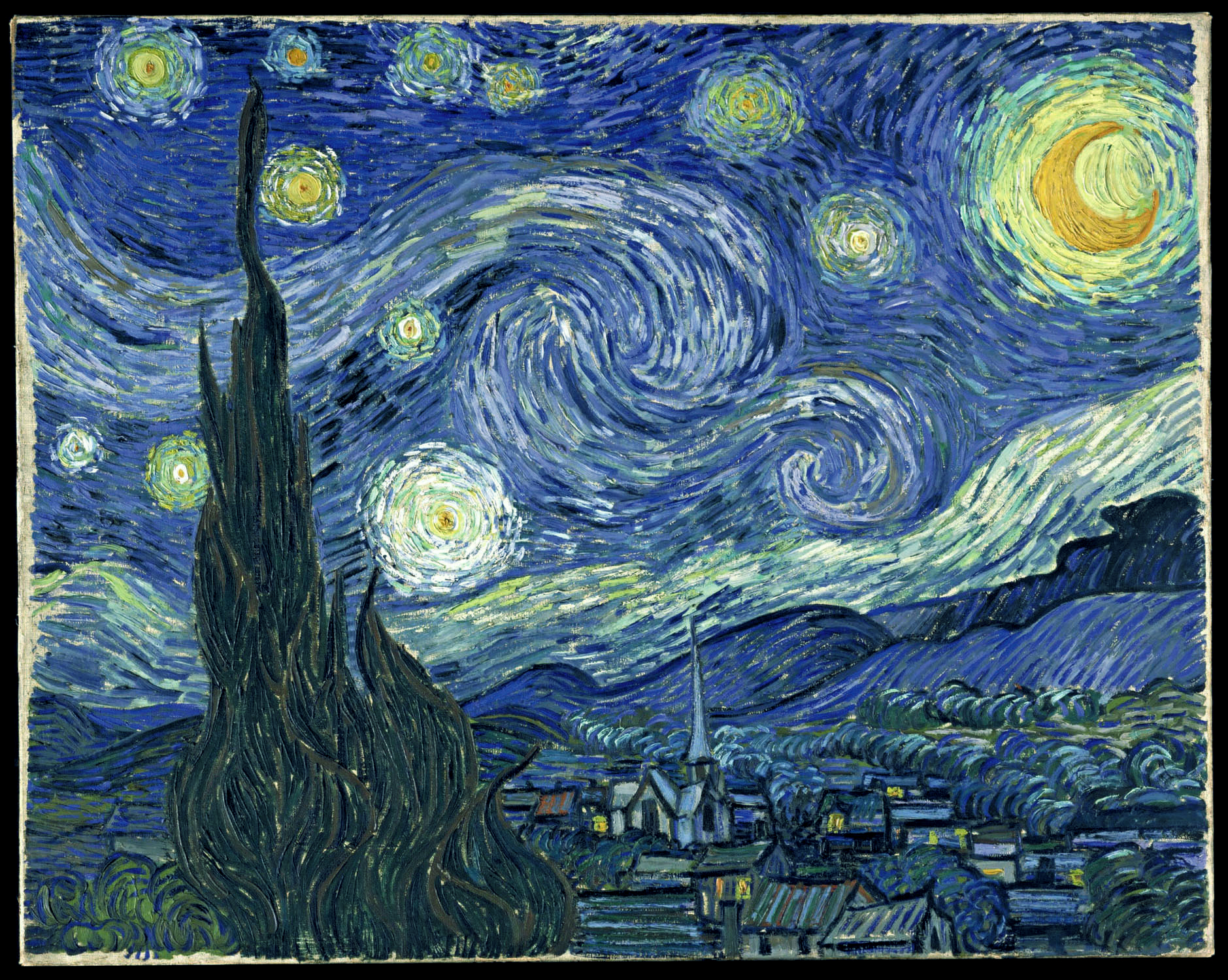
Vincent van Gogh's The Starry Night inspired the artwork for the album cover.

The album's cover artwork was illustrated by Village Green based on ideas and concepts conceived by James Allan. The design is inspired by Vincent van Gogh's 1889 painting The Starry Night. James Allan favoured the comparison between the painting and the band's sound, for their "tranquility, but fury as well."

== Charts ==
=== Weekly charts ===
Chart (2008–2009)	Peak position
Austrian Albums (Ö3 Austria)	50
Belgian Albums (Ultratop Flanders)	62
Danish Albums (Hitlisten)	25
French Albums (SNEP)	106
German Albums (Offizielle Top 100)	33
Irish Albums (IRMA)	2
Italian Albums (FIMI)	44
Norwegian Albums (VG-lista)	17
Scottish Albums (Official Charts)	1
Swedish Albums (Sverigetopplistan)	5
Swiss Albums (Schweizer Hitparade)	52
UK Albums (Official Charts)	2
US Billboard 200	126

=== Year-end charts ===
Chart (2008)	Position
Swedish Albums (Sverigetopplistan)	63
UK Albums (OCC)	105

== Certifications ==
Region	Certification	Certified units/sales
Sweden (GLF)	Gold	20,000^{^}
United Kingdom (BPI)	Platinum	300,000^{^}
^{^} Shipments figures based on certification alone.

== Release history ==
Country	Date	Label	Format	Catalogue #
United Kingdom	8 September 2008	Columbia	CD, download	886973273920 (GOWOW010)
United Kingdom	8 September 2008	Columbia	Limited edition CD/DVD	886973738924 (GOWOW011)
United Kingdom	8 September 2008	Columbia	LP	886973273913 (GOWOW012)
Japan	12 November 2008	Sony Music	CD	SICP-2070
United States	6 January 2009	Columbia	CD	886974356523
