= Collections (Delphic album) =

Studio album by Delphic
- Released: 28 January 2013
- Recorded: 2010–2012, Manchester; Unit 3 in Bristol; Monnow Valley in Wales; Maze Studios in Atlanta
- Genre: Alternative dance
- Length: 42:56
- Label: Polydor
- Producer: Ben Allen and Tim Goldsworthy

Delphic chronology
| Acolyte (2010) | Collections (2013) |

Singles from Collections
- 1. "Baiya" Released: January 2013

Collections is the second studio album by the English alternative dance band Delphic, released by Polydor Records on 28 January 2013.

== Background and recording ==
The band worked on the album between late 2010 and Autumn 2012, first in their own studio in Manchester, followed by production work from Tim Goldsworthy at Monnow Valley Studio in Wales, the Unit 3 studio in Bristol and Ben Allen in his studio in Atlanta. The cover art was created by Vhils. A video trailer for the album was released in November 2012. The album will be preceded by the single "Baiya".

Keyboardist Rick Boardman explained the delay since the band's first album: "We'd been touring for two years. We were just creatively burnt out." In an interview with NME, he went into further detail: "We didn't want to release something that we would mean we could just go back on tour and have fun. We just want to make a really great record."

== Reception ==
Professional ratings
Aggregate scores
| Source | Rating |
|---|---|
| Metacritic | 59/100 |
Review scores
| Source | Rating |
| Clash | 8/10 |
| DIY | 6/10 |
| Drowned in Sound | 5/10 |
| The Guardian | 3/5 stars |
| Impact | 4/5 stars |
| musicOMH | 3/5 stars |
| NME | 5/10 |

Collections received mixed reviews from critics. At Metacritic, the album received an average score of 59, based on 12 reviews, which indicates "mixed or average reviews".NME writer David Renshaw called it "confident and professional" but said that it would be unlikely to appeal to fans of either dance music or guitar bands. In reviewing it for the BBC, Ben Hewitt summarised the album as "on the whole, Collections is a misfire and proof that, sometimes, re-inventing the wheel doesn’t always reap rewards – especially if you were already journeying more gracefully from A-to-B than most of your contemporaries."

== Track listing ==
Collections
| No. | Title | Length |
|---|---|---|
| 1. | "Of the Young" | 3:54 |
| 2. | "Baiya" | 4:22 |
| 3. | "Changes" | 4:29 |
| 4. | "Freedom Found" | 4:20 |
| 5. | "Atlas" | 6:10 |
| 6. | "Tears Before Bedtime" | 2:50 |
| 7. | "The Sun Also Rises" | 3:37 |
| 8. | "Memeo" | 3:38 |
| 9. | "Don't Let the Dreamers Take You Away" | 5:05 |
| 10. | "Exotic" | 4:31 |
| Total length: | | 42:56 |

== Personnel ==
- Written and Performed by – Delphic
- Drums by – Dan Hadley
- Published by – Universal Music Publishing Limited
- Produced by – Tim Goldsworthy with Bruno Ellingham (Tracks 1, 4, 5, 6, 9, 10); Ben H. Allen for MakeRecordsNotBombs (Tracks 2, 3, 7, 8)
- Additional Production by – Ben H. Allen for MakeRecordsNotBombs (Tracks 1, 4, 5, 6, 9, 10)
- Pre-Production by – Hugh Worskett (Tracks 3, 4, 5, 7, 9)
- Engineered by – Jason Kingsland
- Additional Engineering by – Rob Skipworth, Joe D'Agostino, Sumner Jones & Alex Tumay
- Mixed by – Ben H. Allen & Jason Kingsland
- Recorded at – Unit 3, Bristol & Monnow Valley, Wales (Tracks 1, 4, 5, 6, 9, 10); Maze Studios, Atlanta (Tracks 2, 3, 7, 8)
- Mixed at Maze Studios, Atlanta
- Mastered by – John Davis at Metropolis Mastering, London
- Art by – Vhils & Lazarides Limited (2012)
- Artworks Photography by – Neil Blake
- Design and Art Direction by – GiveUpArt
- Trumpet (Tracks 1, 6, 9) – Pete Judge
- Trombone (Tracks 1, 9) – Elizabeth Purnell & Savio Pacini
- French Horn (Tracks 1, 9) – Vicki Reynolds & Alice Kingham
- Bass (Tracks 2, 8) – Robbie Handley
- Bass (Track 9) – Stuart Coleman
- Backing Vocals (Tracks 2, 5, 8, 9, 10) – Rebecca Lovell
- Backing Vocals (Track 1) – Dan Hadley
- Vocal Sample (Track 2) – Sarah Boardman
- Rap (Track 10) – Greg B (2morrows Victory)
- Beatboxing (Track 10) – Alyusha Chagrin
