= Flowers & Football Tops =

Single by Glasvegas

from the album Glasvegas
- Released: 23 February 2009
- Genre: Indie rock
- Length: 3:36 (radio edit); 4:50 (video edit); 6:57 (album version)
- Label: Columbia
- Songwriter(s): James Allan
- Producer(s): James Allan, Rich Costey

Glasvegas singles chronology
| "Please Come Back Home" (2008) | "Flowers & Football Tops" (2009) | "Euphoria, Take My Hand" (2011) |

"Flowers & Football Tops" is a song by Scottish Indie rock band Glasvegas, taken from their self-titled debut album. The song first appeared in a different recording as the B-side to the band's second single release "Daddy's Gone" in November 2007 on Sane Man Records, and was rerecorded and released as a single in the UK on 23 February 2009. The song was written and composed by the band's singer and guitarist James Allan, who explained that the song is about the murder of Kriss Donald to The Daily Record: "Sometimes when you read things or see things on TV, you can't help but put yourself in the position of people's misfortune. That was on my mind when I heard about the murder of Kriss Donald. It's about a kid who never made it home." The title is a reference to the practice common in Britain of laying shirts of the deceased's preferred football team alongside wreaths of flowers. The flowers and footballs tops may be laid at the graveside, or – as is often the case with a violent death – at the place where they died.

"Flowers & Football Tops" contains a reconfigured segment of the song "You Are My Sunshine", written by Charles Mitchell and Jimmie Davis. The green-coloured 7" single for "Flowers & Football Tops" includes live tracks recorded on 16 December 2008 at Glasgow's Barrowlands, while the black vinyl single features tracks recorded on 18 December 2008 at Her Majesty's Young Offenders Institution Polmont, a prison located in Reddingmuirhead in the Falkirk region of central Scotland.

A music video for "Flowers & Football Tops" premiered on The Guardian's website on 19 January 2009, and won two awards at the 2009 UK Music Video Awards for best cinematography and best visual effects. The single entered the top 100 on the UK Singles Chart at number 98, but was a number-one hit in Scotland, becoming Glasvegas's second number one on the Scottish Singles Chart after "Geraldine". The Scottish singles chart at this point only included physical sales so did not register most sales in Scotland which counted towards the UK charts.

== Track listings ==
All songs written by James Allan.

Promo CD (GOWOW017)

1. "Flowers & Football Tops" (radio edit)^{†} – 3:36
2. "Flowers & Football Tops" (album version) – 6:57
3. "Flowers & Football Tops" (radio edit instrumental) – 3:36

^{†}: The 'radio edit' of the song features a slightly different mix by Rich Costey, and omits the "You Are My Sunshine" outro.

CD (GOWOW018)

1. "Flowers & Football Tops" – 6:57
2. "Cruel Moon" (Live on KEXP Seattle) – 4:48

7" #1, Barrowlands (GOWOW019)

- Limited numbered edition green-colored vinyl.
1. "Flowers & Football Tops" (Live at Barrowlands) – 6:22
2. "Stabbed" (Live at Barrowlands) – 2:24

7" #2, Polmont (GOWOW020)

1. "Flowers & Football Tops" (Live at Polmont Prison) – 5:38
2. "Polmont on My Mind" (Live at Polmont Prison) – 4:47

Download

1. "Flowers & Football Tops" (Live Acoustic Version) – 3:44

Download EP

1. "Flowers & Football Tops" (Radio Edit) – 3:36
2. "Please Come Back Home" (Live on KCRW's Morning Becomes Eclectic, 16 January 2009) – 4:18
3. "Flowers & Football Tops" (Live at Barrowlands) – 6:22
4. "Polmont on My Mind" (Live at Polmont Prison) [Cropped^{††}] – 3:43

^{††}: The digital release of the song removes over a minute of banter between James and the audience.

== Credits and personnel ==
- James Allan – electric guitar, vocals, producer
- Rab Allan – electric guitar
- Paul Donoghue – bass guitar
- Caroline McKay – drum kit
- Rich Costey – producer, mixing

== Charts ==
Chart performance for "Flowers & Football Tops"
| Chart (2009) | Peak position |
|---|---|
| Scotland (OCC) | 1 |
| UK Singles (OCC) | 98 |
