= Geraldine (song) =

2008 single by Glasvegas

Single by Glasvegas

from the album Glasvegas
- Released: 23 June 2008
- Genre: Indie rock
- Length: 3:24 (radio edit); 4:06 (single version); 3:45 (album version)
- Label: Columbia
- Songwriter: James Allan
- Producers: James Allan, Rich Costey

Glasvegas singles chronology
"It's My Own Cheating Heart That Makes Me Cry" (2007)	"Geraldine" (2008)	"Daddy's Gone" (2008)

"Geraldine" is a 2008 single by Scottish indie rock band Glasvegas. It was released on 23 June 2008 and reached number 16 on the UK Singles Chart. It also reached number one on the Scottish Singles Chart.

According to The Guardian:

The song was inspired by the work being done with Glasgow social services by Allan's sister and a colleague, Geraldine Lennon. The woman the song is named for says that , when it comes to the reality of social care work, Allan "just got it". Lennon says: "Unfortunately, all the stories in the papers are about the things that go wrong - not the thousands of things that go right. [Allan] writes about things that interest him, and I think from hearing so much about [our] work, he captured the empathy that workers have with the people they work with."

— https://www.theguardian.com/society/2009/mar/11/social-work-glasvegas-geraldine

On the album, the 20 second intro to "Geraldine" is tacked onto the end of preceding song "Flowers & Football Tops," giving "Geraldine" a 3:45 run time. The single version of "Geraldine" includes this intro, making it 4:06. The song was nominated for Best International Song at the 2008 Swedish Rockbjörnen awards.

== Track listing ==
All songs written by James Allan, except where noted.

Promo CD (GOWOW001)

1. "Geraldine" (Radio Edit) – 3:24
2. "Geraldine" (Album Version) – 4:06
3. "Geraldine" (Instrumental) – 4:06

CD (GOWOW002)

1. "Geraldine" – 4:06
2. "The Prettiest Thing on Saltcoats Beach" – 6:19

7" #1 (GOWOW003)

- Limited numbered edition blue-colored vinyl.
1. "Geraldine" – 4:06
2. "The Prettiest Thing on Saltcoats Beach" – 6:19

7" #2 (GOWOW004)

1. "Geraldine" – 4:06
2. "Everybody's Got to Learn Sometime" (The Korgis cover, written by James Warren) – 4:54

Download

1. "Geraldine" (Live Acoustic Version) – 3:41

== Charts ==
Chart (2008)	Peak position
Denmark (Tracklisten)	36
Scotland Singles (Official Charts)	1
Sweden (Sverigetopplistan)	25
UK Singles (Official Charts)	16
