= Tom Fun Orchestra =

Canadian indie rock band

The Tom Fun Orchestra
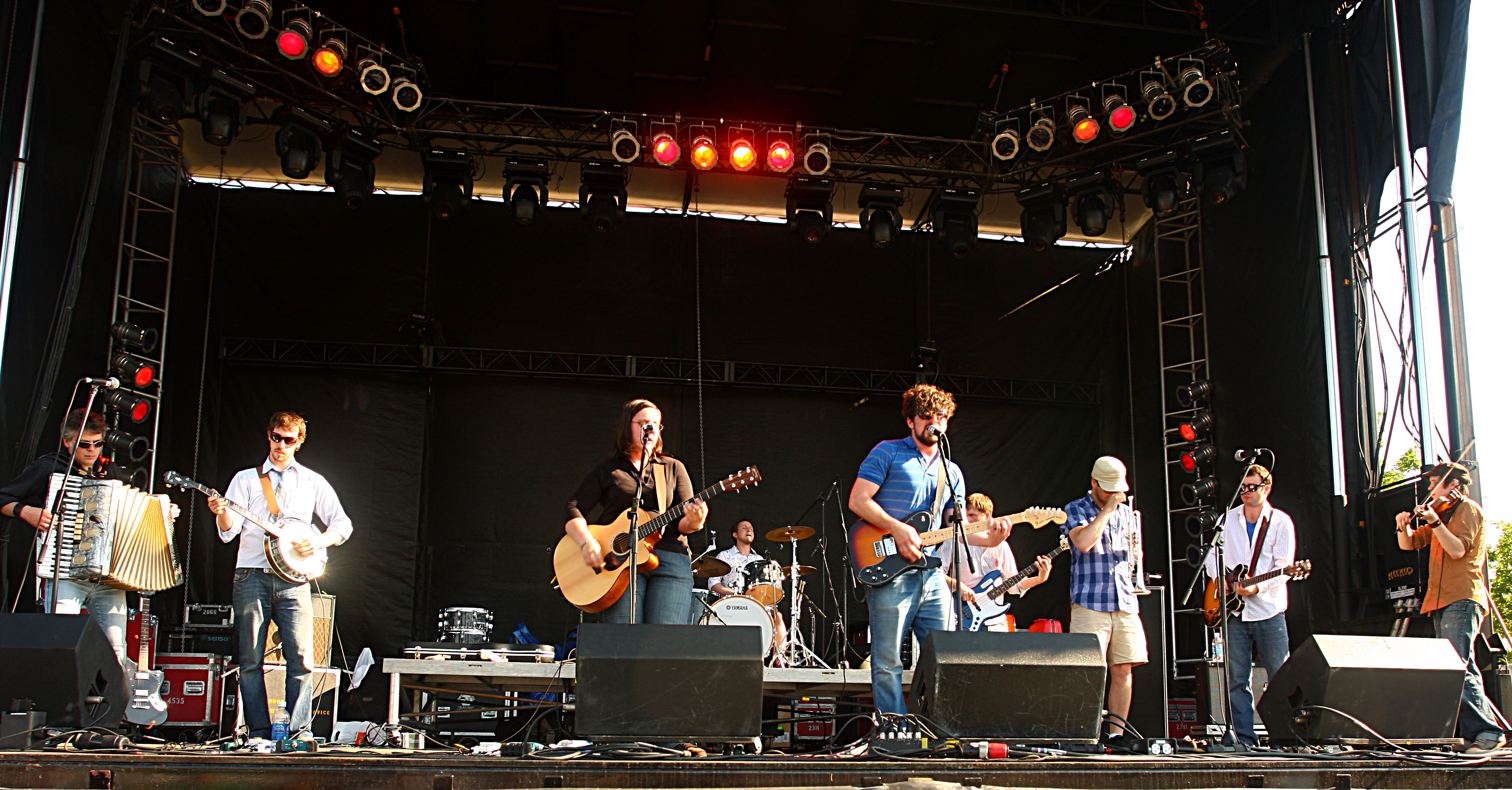
- The band at a Canada Day concert in Charlottetown

Background information
- Origin: Cape Breton, Canada
- Genres: Indie rock
- Years active: 2005–present
- Label: Company House Records
- Members: Ian MacDougall; Albert Lionais; Dave Mahalik; Victor Tomiczek; Breagh Potter; Shane O'Handley; Steven Wilton
- Past members: Alicia Penney; Donnie Calabrese; Merlin Clarke; Morgan Currie; Zach MacLean; Devon Strang; Lachie MacDonald; Glenn Barrington; Nathan Richards; Thomas Allen; Carmen Townsend; Colin Grant
- Website: tomfun.ca

The Tom Fun Orchestra is a Canadian indie rock ensemble from Cape Breton, Canada. The band features an unconventional mix of electric and acoustic instruments, including violin, banjo, accordion, trumpet, double bass, electric guitars and drums, and have elicited comparisons to acts ranging from The Clash, Tom Waits and The Pogues to The Arcade Fire and Broken Social Scene.

== History ==
Press photo taken by Nathan Boone

=== Formation and You Will Land with a Thud ===
The Tom Fun Orchestra was formed in Sydney, Nova Scotia, in 2005 by singer-songwriter Ian MacDougall. The group has since performed throughout Central and Eastern Canada as well as in Ireland, Australia and the UK. The band recorded their debut album, You Will Land With a Thud, with producers Gordon Gano (singer-guitarist with the Violent Femmes) and Warren Bruleigh. It was mixed by Phil Palazzola and mastered by Howie Weinberg and released January 29, 2008, on Company House Records (EMI Music Canada). At the 2008 Music Nova Scotia Awards, The Tom Fun Orchestra won awards for Entertainer of the Year and Galaxy Rising Star. In March 2009, the band received its first East Coast Music Award with the ECMA Galaxy Rising Star Award. At the 2010 edition of the awards, Tom Fun received the Video of the Year award for their song "Throw Me To The Rats".

=== Earthworm Heart ===
In early 2010, The Tom Fun Orchestra began recording their second full-length album, Earthworm Heart. MacDougall had been writing for the new album since shortly after the release of their first album, but the tracking process was very gradual. On July 16, they made a new song entitled "Miles Davis" available for free download from their website. In late July, they embarked on their second cross-Canada tour, which included a show supporting Primus in Toronto.

In September 2012, Tom Fun announced their second full-length album, titled Earthworm Heart, via a cryptic message on their website. The album would feature 14 new tracks recorded at Soundpark Studios, and will be released on November 13, 2012. However, on October 15, the entire album was made available to stream on Exclaim's website. Produced and mixed by Jamie Foulds with Albert Lionais, the 14 tracks signalled a departure from the Celtic sound of You Will Land With a Thud, and saw the band take a much more stripped down, rock-oriented approach. Although still featured, the banjos and fiddles stepped back and made room for more guitars. What violin there was seemed to take on a more orchestral feel.

On October 18, Tom Fun embarked on another cross-Canada tour in support of Earthworm Heart.

The album was named "alternative recording of the year" at the 2013 Nova Scotia Music Week.

== Discography ==
- 2005: Tragicfoxtankliftoff (three-song demo)
- 2008: You Will Land with a Thud
- 2012: Earthworm Heart
- 2021: I'm Your Man (single)
