= This Momentary =

Single by Delphic

from the album Acolyte
- Released: 25 June 2009
- Genre: Electronic rock
- Length: 4:35
- Label: Polydor
- Songwriter(s): Richard Boardman, Matt Cocksedge, James Cook, Dan Hadley
- Producer(s): Ewan Pearson

Delphic singles chronology
"Counterpoint" (2009)	"This Momentary" (2009)	"Doubt" (2010)

Alternative cover

"This Momentary" is the second single by British alternative dance band Delphic, and is the third track on their debut album Acolyte. After all remixes went on the song CD or download when it was released only one didn't make it on which was a Skream remix. The song was featured in The Art of Getting By.

== Music video ==
The video for This Momentary was directed by Dave Ma and produced by Pulse Films. It was shot by Ross McLennan on RED cameras. The video was filmed in the Chernobyl Zone of Exclusion. Instead of cliche shots of a place stripped of all life and nature, it shows the people still living in and around Chernobyl. Director Dave Ma said "The aim for this video was to focus on the people still living in and around the Chernobyl area...It was about showing the humanity of the people and about capturing little moments in their lives in a composed and photographic way."

=== Awards ===
The music video for "This Momentary" has been nominated for three UK Music Video Awards, including Best Cinematography, Best Editing and Best Telecine.

== Track listing ==
- 12"
1. "This Momentary (Original)"
2. "This Momentary (Parallels Remix)"
3. "This Momentary (Golden Bug Remix)"
4. "This Momentary (Radioproof Remix)"
5. "This Momentary (Le Matos Remix)"
- Download
1. "This Momentary (Original)"
2. "This Momentary (Parallels Remix)"
3. "This Momentary (Golden Bug Remix)"
4. "This Momentary (Radioproof Remix)"
5. "This Momentary (Le Matos Remix)"
