= It's My Own Cheating Heart That Makes Me Cry =

Single by Glasvegas

from the album Glasvegas
- B-side: "Be My Baby"
- Released: 7 February 2008
- Studio: Central Sound (Glasgow, Scotland)
- Genre: Indie rock
- Length: 4:45; 4:25 (album version)
- Label: Sane Man
- Songwriter: James Allan
- Producer: James Allan

Glasvegas singles chronology
"Daddy's Gone" (2007)	"It's My Own Cheating Heart That Makes Me Cry" (2008)	"Geraldine" (2008)

"It's My Own Cheating Heart That Makes Me Cry" is a song by Scottish Indie rock band Glasvegas. The song was written and composed by the band's singer and guitarist James Allan.

The lyrics explore the concepts of self-loathing, inevitable guilt and regret resulting from infidelity within an interpersonal relationship. The genre employed in the song is heavily guitar-based, making use of delay and reverb effects; and produced using the Wall of Sound technique.

"It's My Own Cheating Heart That Makes Me Cry" was originally released as a download single through Sane Man on 7 February 2008, and a limited edition 7" one week later. The song received mostly positive reception from music journalists, with single reviews praising its lyrical content and production and likening it to the work of The Jesus and Mary Chain.

== Origins and recording ==
James Allan wrote and composed the song prior to the album recording sessions at Central Sound Studios in Glasgow, Scotland, where the band recorded their previous two singles, "Go Square Go!" and "Daddy's Gone". Kevin Burleigh, who co-produced "Go Square Go!" with James Allan and engineered "Daddy's Gone", also engineered "It's My Own Cheating Heart That Makes Me Cry". James Allan handled production duties while recording the song, as well as on the B-side to the single—a cover version of The Ronettes' "Be My Baby".

In an interview, James Allan said he wrote the album to convey a sincere feeling during a time when he was unemployed and often spent time daydreaming. "It's My Own Cheating Heart That Makes Me Cry" wasn't meant to be confessional, but it held many observations he had at the time.

== Critical reception ==
"It's My Own Cheating Heart That Makes Me Cry" received a positive reception in the music press. Mark Beaumont of NME named it Track of the Week, and praised the song, stating that it "stirs more emotion than a million candle-lit meals" and compares it to previous single, "Daddy's Gone", as well as the work of fellow Glasgow band The Jesus and Mary Chain, stating it "shimmers in the kind of elegiac-yet-filthy Wall of Sound thrum [reminiscent of Psychocandy] [...] only this time even more dark, dolorous and redolent." David Peisner called the track the "emotional centerpiece" of the album Glasvegas, a "jaw-dropping 'crescendo of desmise'... which examines the demons infidelity unleashes."

John Murphy of musicOMH praised the song's composition, stating "[broad] Scottish brogues, lashings of feedback and multi-layered guitars and a massive dosage of self-loathing all combine here to produce one of the most compelling singles in months." Murphy hailed Glasvegas the "sound of young Scotland" and also compared the song to The Jesus and Mary Chain, stating "at times [it] sounds like a throwback to the days of The Jesus and Mary Chain." In February 2008, Q magazine listed the single at number 10 in their list of the 50 essential tracks you need to download.

After the 10th Anniversary of the Album, NME described the song (among many in the first album) as an anthem that "wrapped the deepest sorrows and degradations of neoliberal Britain in the heroic textures of the Wall Of Sound and sepia Americana".

== Formats ==
The song was first released as a digital download through Sane Man on 7 February 2008, and received a physical release one week later as a 7" single, limited to 2000 copies. A promo CD was also released. The artwork featured on the sleeve of the 7" is by Rob Biddulph, and was designed in the style of singles from the 1960s. Biddulph also designed the artwork for the previous single, "Daddy's Gone", in the same style.

== Track listings ==
All songs written by James Allan, except where noted.

7" single (SAN002); digital download

1. "It's My Own Cheating Heart That Makes Me Cry" – 4:45
2. "Be My Baby" (Barry/Greenwich/Spector) – 4:12

Promo CD

1. "It's My Own Cheating Heart That Makes Me Cry" – 4:45
2. "Be My Baby" (Barry/Greenwich/Spector) – 4:12
3. "It's My Own Cheating Heart That Makes Me Cry" (clean version) – 4:41

== Personnel and credits ==
Glasvegas

- James Allan – vocals, guitar
- Rab Allan – guitar
- Paul Donoghue – bass
- Caroline McKay – drum

Production

- James Allan – Producer
- Kevin Burleigh – Engineer
