= You Will Land with a Thud =

Studio album by Tom Fun Orchestra
- Released: January 29, 2008
- Recorded: Carriage House Studios, Stamford, CT
- Genre: Indie rock
- Length: 48:30
- Label: Company House Records
- Producers: Warren Bruleigh, Gordan Gano

You Will Land with a Thud is the debut album by Canadian indie rock band Tom Fun Orchestra, released on January 29, 2008, on Company House Records. The album was released to positive reviews amongst Internet reviewers but gained little mainstream attention outside of Nova Scotia.

== Background ==
You Will Land With A Thud was recorded in April 2007 at Carriage House Studios in Stamford, Connecticut. The band worked with Warren Bruleigh and Violent Femmes frontman Gordon Gano on the record. The album was mixed by Phil Palazzola and mastered by Howie Weinberg. Additional recording was done in Cape Breton, Nova Scotia at Soundpark Studios

== Lyrics and songwriting ==
Singer Ian MacDougall's would usually use stories in his lyrics to get across strong themes of adolescence, loss of innocence, and the questioning of evolving morals and aspirations. Banjo player Victor Tomiczek said in a promo video that MacDougall would “bring in a skeleton of a song, and the rest of the band would give it a heart, skin, and vital organs”

== Reception ==
Reviews for You Will Land With A Thud were generally good amongst blog reviewers, with one review saying it “bridges generation gaps and defies musical clichés”. However, the album received little attention from high-profile music critics

== Awards ==
On the strength of You Will Land With A Thud, The Tom Fun Orchestra was named Entertainer Of The Year and Galaxy Rising Star at the 2008 Music Nova Scotia Awards, and Galaxy Rising Star at the 2009 East Coast Music Awards. Videos for the songs "Throw Me To The Rats" and "Bottom Of The River" were nominated for ECMA Video Of The Year and UK Music Video Award's Animated Video of the Year respectively, with "Throw Me To The Rats" coming out victorious.

== Track listing ==
1. When You Were Mine
2. Rum & Tequila
3. Throw Me to The Rats
4. Watchmaker
5. Marshall Applewhite
6. Last of the Curious Thieves
7. Highway Siren Song Breakdown
8. Heart Attack in an Old Motel
9. Tar Pond Tango
10. Behind the Fence
11. Bottom of the River
12. You Will Land with a Thud
