= Daddy's Gone =

2007 single by Glasvegas

Single by Glasvegas

from the album Glasvegas
- Released: 5 November 2007 (original); 25 August 2008 (re-release)
- Recorded: Central Sound Studios, Glasgow, Scotland
- Genre: Indie rock
- Length: 4:25
- Label: Sane Man (original); Columbia Records (re-release)
- Songwriter: James Allan
- Producer: James Allan

Glasvegas singles chronology
"Go Square Go!" (2006)	"Daddy's Gone" (2007)	"It's My Own Cheating Heart That Makes Me Cry" (2008)

Continued singles chronology
"Geraldine" (2008)	"Daddy's Gone" (2008)	"Please Come Back Home" (2008)

Alternative cover
- 2008 re-release

"Daddy's Gone" is a song by Scottish indie rock band Glasvegas. The song was written and composed by the band's singer and guitarist James Allan.

"Daddy's Gone" was originally released as a limited edition 7" and a download single through Sane Man on 5 November 2007. The song received mostly positive reception from music journalists, with single reviews praising its lyrical content and production.

The single was re-released as part of the promotion for Glasvegas. The newer version has a slower tempo and slightly rougher sound. It was released on 25 August 2008 as a CD, a download EP, and two different 7" singles. It entered the UK Singles Chart at number 12 and the Scottish Singles Chart at number two on the chart dated 31 August 2008. It also found minor popularity in Flemish Belgium, appearing on the Ultratip chart at number 12.

The song featured in the hit American TV Series 'Chuck', Season 2 Episode 19.

== Origins and recording ==
James Allan wrote and composed the song prior to the recording sessions at Central Sound Studios in Glasgow, Scotland, where the band recorded their previous single, "Go Square Go!." James Allan handled all production duties as well as its B-side, "Flowers & Football Tops."

== Musical content ==
"Daddy's Gone" is in A major and in 4/4 time. The song is based around I-VI-IV-V and I-III-VI-V chord progressions for the verses and the choruses, respectively.

== Formats and B-sides ==
The song was first released as a 7" single, limited to 1000 copies, and a download through Sane Man on 5 November 2007. A promo CD was also released. The artwork featured on the sleeve of the 7" is by Rob Biddulph, and was designed in the style of singles from the 1960s. Biddulph also designed the artwork for the band's following single, "It's My Own Cheating Heart That Makes Me Cry," in the same style.

The 2008 re-release CD and one of the 7" singles has a new song called "A Little Thing Called 'Fear'" as the b-side, while the alternate 7" single has a cover version of Nirvana's "Come as You Are." All three formats feature the album version of "Daddy's Gone."

== Critical reception ==
During professional reviews, "Daddy's Gone" received positive reception. James McMahon of NME named the song Track of the Week and praised the song's subject matter, stating "the love between a young man and his absent dad is rarely visited [...] which makes this second single from Glasvegas [...] all the more touching." McMahon also referred to the band's genre, stating "they sound like an amalgamation of every great single Creation Records released pre-Oasis (The Jesus and Mary Chain, The Pastels and Saint Etienne), while at the same time managing to tap into the disparate brilliance of the likes of Elvis Presley, early-Beatles, The Stone Roses, Orange Juice, Roy Orbison, The Velvet Underground and The Proclaimers." NME later awarded the song number two in a list of Best Tracks of 2007.

Andrew Farley of Drowned in Sound praised the song; hailing it as "fantastic," noting the song's individuality, saying, "it's not every day you come across a song of this stature," and referred to the production, stating "Phil Spector would be proud." Farley also describes it as "one of the breakthrough tracks of 2007."

The Daily Telegraph rock critic Neil McCormick was extremely impressed with the song, going as far as placing it at number 18 in his list of the 100 Greatest Songs of All Time in 2009. He described the track as an "epic, emotional, boldly prosaic rock and roll ballad of paternal abandonment.".

In October 2011, NME placed it at number 123 on its list "150 Best Tracks of the Past 15 Years".

== Track listings ==
All songs written by James Allan, except where noted.

=== 2007 version ===
7" vinyl (SAN001); download; CDR promo

1. "Daddy's Gone" – 4:08
2. "Flowers & Football Tops" – 5:38

=== 2008 version ===
Promo CD (GOWOW006)

1. "Daddy's Gone" (Clean Radio Edit) – 3:41
2. "Daddy's Gone" (Radio Edit) – 3:41
3. "Daddy's Gone" (Album Version) – 4:25
4. "Daddy's Gone" (Instrumental) – 4:25

CD (GOWOW007)

1. "Daddy's Gone" – 4:25
2. "A Little Thing Called 'Fear'" – 3:43

7" No. 1 (GOWOW008)

- Limited numbered edition red-colored vinyl.
1. "Daddy's Gone" – 4:25
2. "A Little Thing Called 'Fear'" – 3:43

7" No. 2 (GOWOW009)

1. "Daddy's Gone" – 4:25
2. "Come as You Are" (written by Kurt Cobain) – 3:22

Download EP

1. "Daddy's Gone" – 4:25
2. "A Little Thing Called 'Fear'" – 3:43
3. "Come as You Are" – 3:22
4. "Daddy's Gone" (Live Acoustic Version) – 4:17

== Credits and personnel ==
Glasvegas

- James Allan – guitar, vocals,
- Rab Allan – electric guitar
- Paul Donoghue – bass
- Caroline McKay – drum

Production

- James Allan – Producer
- Kevin Burleigh – Engineer

== Charts ==
Chart (2008)	Peak position
Belgium (Ultratip Bubbling Under Flanders)	12
Scotland Singles (OCC)	2
UK Singles (OCC)	12
