= Delphic (band) =

English alternative dance band

Background information
- Origin: Manchester, England
- Genres: Alternative dance; electronic rock; indie rock
- Years active: 2007–2014; 2025–present
- Labels: Polydor; Modular; Kitsuné; Dangerbird; MapleMusic (Canada)
- Spinoff of: Snowfight in the City Centre
- Past members: Richard Boardman; Matt Cocksedge; James Cook; Dan Hadley

Delphic are an alternative dance band from Manchester, England. They are signed to Polydor but released their first single "Counterpoint", produced by Ewan Pearson, in April 2009 through R&S Records.

In 2009, the band toured the UK music festival circuit, playing at T in the Park, Reading and Leeds Festivals, and Creamfields, among others.

The EP for "This Momentary" was released on 31 August 2009 through Kitsuné. The music video was nominated for three UK Music Video Awards, including Best Cinematography, Best Editing and Best Telecine. In November 2009, they made their first TV appearance appearing on Later... with Jools Holland playing "Doubt" and "Halcyon".

Delphic were one of the 15 shortlisted music acts for the BBC Sound of 2010 as announced on 7 December 2009. When the winners were announced in early 2010, it was revealed that the band had placed third on BBC Sound of 2010, after Ellie Goulding and Marina and the Diamonds.

Acolyte was released in Australia and New Zealand on 22 January 2010 via Modular and in the United States on 29 June 2010 via Dangerbird Records. Collections, the band's second album, was released on 28 January 2013.

Delphic collaborated with Manchester International Festival in July 2013, performing a three night exclusive residency at the festival, re-working their entire album Collections with an array of instruments from around the world, played by musicians from the UK. The event series was entitled 'Our Worldly Collections'.

Richard Boardman has now gone on to start a Manchester-based songwriting collective known as The Six who have most recently written on the Louis Tomlinson and Bebe Rexha single "Back to You".

== History ==
=== Acolyte (2010) ===
Announced on Delphic's website on 2 November 2009, their debut album was called Acolyte and released on Polydor on the band's own imprint Chimeric Records on 11 January 2010. Reviewing for BBC Music, writer Lou Thomas commented that it "might just be the first great album of 2010". Acolyte was also described as "on kissing terms with magnificence" by Simon Price of the Independent. The singles released from Acolyte were "Doubt", "Halcyon", and "Counterpoint", the latter of which was re-released later on Chimeric.

"Counterpoint" was used as one of the theme songs for Sky Sports' coverage of the Premier League in the 2010–11 season, and also is one of the songs included in the playlist of Pro Evolution Soccer 2010.

The song "Red Lights" has been featured on the new E4 advert for 90210.

The song "Halcyon" has been featured nationwide on the new advert for the Samsung Monte mobile phone.

The first song from the album, "Clarion Call", features in the F1 2010 video game by Codemasters, the video game Saint's Row: The Third, and is used by Sky Sports as theme music for International Cricket highlights programmes.

After a sold out UK tour in early January 2010 with pop noir band Mirrors, the band set tour dates for a second and third run of the UK in March and May.

The band were also nominated for the "Best UK & Ireland New Act" in the 2010 MTV EMAs in Madrid.

Bruce Dessau of The Arts Desk observed a "fair share of catchy melodies" and a talent for "blending a lot of old things together into a tasty package". He said that if OMD were "the children" of Kraftwerk, then Delphic "must be the grandchildren".

=== Collections (2013) ===
In an April 2012 interview with NME, Boardman said the band had been working on material for their second album over the course of 18 months and had been working with producers Ben Allen (Bombay Bicycle Club) and DFA Records co-founder Tim Goldsworthy. In the article, he noted their and Goldsworthy's shared affinity for contemporary R&B, which suggests a possible shift in direction on the new album.

In an interview on the unofficial Delphic Fansite, Boardman confirmed the release dates for the first single and the follow-up to 2010's Acolyte would be "soon". The album's title and song titles remain unknown, though Boardman revealed there was a song with a working title of "Bhangra" that has since been renamed.

BBC News reported on 28 June 2012 that Delphic, alongside Muse, Elton John vs. Pnau, Dizzee Rascal, and The Chemical Brothers, would be releasing one of the five official songs of the 2012 Summer Olympics taking place in London, United Kingdom. In line with a previous report by international news agency Reuters, Delphic's single was released on 23 July 2012 on Polydor.

"Good Life," Delphic's London 2012 Olympics single, premiered as the "Hottest Record in the World" feature of Zane Lowe's evening Radio 1 programme on 18 July 2012. In an interview with Lowe directly following the song's worldwide premiere, guitarist Matt Cocksedge explained their management had submitted a demo of "Good Life" without the band's knowledge, until it was revealed to them later that it had been chosen as one of the official singles of the 2012 Summer Olympics. Rick Boardman went on to say that the album has a planned early 2013 release.

When asked by UK music blog There Goes the Fear whether "Good Life" was a good example of their yet to be released material, singer/bassist James Cook stated that the new single was "...closer to the Acolyte material than any of the other new tunes. It is representative more of [the] mood [of the new material], not [its] musical direction.".

On 15 August 2012, Delphic announced they would be previewing the new album material on a UK tour taking place October and November 2012. The band performed 3 new songs live for the first time at Free Form Festival 2012 in Warsaw, Poland – "Baiya", "Memeo" and "Atlas". On the UK Tour they debuted another new song named "Changes".

The first details of the new album, Collections, surfaced on 1 November 2012 on Delphic's website which coincide with the final day of Delphic tour in autumn 2012. The band posted Introducing 'Collections', a sample of the new album on VEVO on 31 October 2012, in which new songs "Baiya", "Memeo" and "Atlas" were featured.

Delphic unveiled the first single taken from their new album – titled "Baiya" – in November. The track is currently streaming online.

=== Get Familiar (mixtape) (2014) ===
On 22 April 2014, the band posted a seven track mixtape called 'Get Familiar' on their SoundCloud page.

=== The Six (2014) ===
Also in 2014, Rick Boardman started a Manchester-based songwriting collective known as The Six. Later that year, The Six were featured on the Gorgon City track "Take It All" and then supported them on a UK tour. He has 31 registered songs to his name, and has also worked on the 2014 single "Real Love" by Clean Bandit and Jess Glynne, which peaked at 2 in the UK singles chart and number 2 in Germany. Boardman continues to lead The Six who have more recently written on the Louis Tomlinson and Bebe Rexha single "Back to You” and Galantis single "Love on Me”.

== Discography ==
=== Studio albums ===
Year	Details	Peak chart positions				
Year	Details	UK	AUS	IRL	FRA	BEL
2010	Acolyte: Released: 11 January 2010; Label: Polydor, Dangerbird; Formats: CD, Vinyl, digital download	8	66	64	151	90
2013	Collections: Released: 28 January 2013; Label: Polydor; Formats: CD, Vinyl, digital download	77	—	—	—	—

=== Mixtapes ===
List of mixtapes, with selected details
Title	Mixtape details
Get Familiar	Released: 22 April 2014; Label: Chimeric Records; Format: Digital download, streaming

=== Singles ===
Year	Single	Chart Positions		Album
Year	Single	UK	UK DAN	Album
2009	"Counterpoint"	—	—	Acolyte
2010	"Doubt"	79	—	Acolyte
2010	"Halcyon"	143	16	Acolyte
2010	"Counterpoint" (re-release)	—	—	Acolyte
2012	"Good Life" (official Olympics single)	—	—	—
2013	"Baiya"	—	—	Collections
2026	"Between Forms"	—	—	—
2026	"Everything Will Find You"			
2026	"Carpentered World"			
2026	In the Quietness			

=== Promotional singles ===
Year	Single	Album
2009	"This Momentary" ^{[A]}	Acolyte
2009	"Sanctuary" ^{[B]}	

Notes:

- ^{A} – The single was released alongside the album Acolyte as iTunes Single of the Week.
- ^{B} – The single was released as a 'Buzz' single during November 2009, although it did not appear on Acolyte. Delphic's members were previously part of a band called "Snowfight in the City Centre," supporting Ghosts (Atlantic) in 2007.
