= Glasvegas =

Scottish indie rock band

- Glasvegas Line Up - November 2026 - L to R: Rab Allan, Paul Donoghue, James Allan and Chris Dickie

Background information
- Origin: Dalmarnock, Glasgow, Scotland
- Genre: Indie rock
- Years active: 2003–present
- Labels: Modern Sky UK (2025 - Present); Go Wow Records (2013 - Present); BMG (2013–2014); Columbia (2008–2011)
- Members: James Allan; Rab Allan; Paul Donoghue; Chris Dickie
- Past members: Ryan Ross; Caroline McKay; Jonna Löfgren
- Website: www.glasvegas.net

Glasvegas are a Scottish indie rock band from Glasgow. The band consists of James Allan (vocals), Rab Allan (lead guitar) and Paul Donoghue (bass guitar), with Swedish drummer Jonna Löfgren joining the group in 2010 until her departure in 2020. Their platinum-selling debut album, Glasvegas, released in September 2008, was well received by critics and reached No. 2 in the UK Albums Chart. It was nominated for the Mercury Music Prize in September 2009. The album went on to enjoy further critical and commercial success in North America and in Sweden (where it went Gold). On 1 December 2008, less than three months after the release of their debut album, the band released the mini-album A Snowflake Fell (And It Felt Like a Kiss), a 6-track Christmas EP, which was recorded in Transylvania.

On 4 April 2011 the band released their second album, Euphoric Heartbreak, which was recorded in a beach house in Santa Monica. The album reached No. 10 in the UK and No. 1 in Sweden. The album received polarised opinion and was not as commercially successful as the band's debut album. Several months later the band and their major label, Sony parted company. In June 2013, the band announced that they had signed a major record deal with BMG. The band released their third album Later...When the TV Turns to Static in September 2013. It received generally favourable reviews from critics but failed to match the commercial success of previous albums.

In 2018, the band announced a UK tour celebrating the ten-year anniversary of their self titled platinum-selling debut album. The album was also reissued with new artwork in gold. On 14 August 2020, Glasvegas released their first single in seven years, "Keep Me a Space". The single is taken from their fourth album, Godspeed, which was released in April 2021 by the band's own label Go Wow Records.

On October 27th 2026 Glasvegas released their first new single in over six years called "Degüello" coupled with news of the band's fifth studio album "Airy Fairy", which will be released April 2nd 2027.

== History ==
=== Formation and early years (2003–2007) ===
The band was formed by cousins James Allan and Rab Allan in the summer of 2003 with Paul Donoghue and Ryan Ross on drums completing the line-up soon after. Local gigs in and around Glasgow were frequent and in May 2004 the band released a self-financed limited edition double A-side single, "I'm Gonna Get Stabbed"/"Ina Lvs Rab" on CD. The single gained an early and positive review for Glasvegas from Rick Fulton of the Daily Record on 24 December 2004. The single (along with some early demos) gained (their first) radio airplay and favourable feedback from Jim Gellatly on his radio show 'Beatbreakers' in January 2005, which was broadcast on the now defunct Beat106FM. Although many make the obvious observation that the band name is a mix of Glasgow (where they are from) and Las Vegas (the world capital of entertainment), the band have made it clear many times that this was never the reason why the band called themselves Glasvegas. According to James Allan he liked the name Glasvegas as it rolled sweetly off the tongue. It is a possibility that it is the combination of the Gaelic 'Glas' (grey) with the Spanish 'vegas' (meadow). Splitting the name into two words as "Glas Vegas" is incorrect.

When Ryan Ross left in late 2004, the band went on a very brief hiatus until Caroline McKay was asked to join the group in early 2005. Although having never played drums before James asked her to be the drummer because she looked "cool". The band played most of their gigs in and around Scotland through 2005 and 2006 with Caroline performing basic drumming while the more intricate drum parts were taken care of by a drum sample machine on stage operated by Rab. As they played more and more gigs Caroline's skill level increased and the band became increasingly less reliant on the sample machine. It was 3 Feb 2006 when the band first came to the attention of Alan McGee who saw them play third on the bill at the iconic Glasgow venue King Tuts Wah Wah Hut. McGee was also accompanied that night by ex-Libertine Carl Barât who, on the strength of their performance, offered Glasvegas several support slots with his band Dirty Pretty Things throughout 2006.

In October 2006, the band released a self-financed limited edition 7" vinyl single, "Go Square Go!/Legs'n' Show", on a small independent record label called WaKS Records followed by a digital release two weeks later. This limited edition vinyl single of 500 pressings sold out within days and has since become a collector's item with the single exchanging hands for a three-figure sum on eBay. On 4 November 2006, the band their launch night gig for "Go Square Go!/Legs'n' Show" held at the Glasgow Art School. In mid-December 2006, the band played a special gig in Polmont Young Offenders Institute which was also a pivotal moment for the band musically, as it was during this gig that they made the decision to move away from their reliance on drum samples. The close of 2006 saw the band play their first European gig at La Flèche d'Or in Paris on 28 December 2006. The band then rounded off 2006 with a gig at the Proud Galleries in Camden on New Year's Eve.

=== Indie sensations and Sane Man Recordings (2007–2008) ===
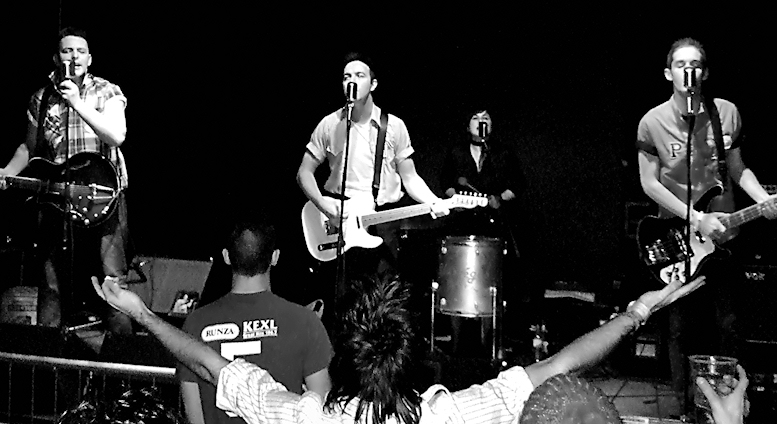
Glasvegas performing at the Dundee Doghouse, 2007

The band opened 2007 with a headline show at King Tuts Wah Wah Hut. In early February 2007 (with assistance from Alan McGee), the band made a video for one of their demos, "Daddy's Gone", which was shot in London and in Glasgow's East End. This early video helped pave the way for the song's popularity. In late February 2007, James Allan made the decision to post up all the band's demos on MySpace for free download. These free downloads helped foster recognition about Glasvegas and soon their gigs were selling out. On 8 March 2007, the band took time out to play a low key acoustic gig in Barlinnie Prison in Glasgow. At the beginning of April 2007, Alan McGee invited the band down to London to play three consecutive club nights that he was involved in; Death Disco @ Notting Hill Arts Club, Kill Surf City @ Punk and Queen is Dead @ Borderline. Over these three days the band also produced their first black and white 'press' shots at Bloomsbury Bowling Lanes, London on 6 April. On 25 May, the band played their first festival date at the (now defunct) Isle of Skye music festival before playing their third prison gig at Saughton Prison, Edinburgh on 7 June. On 14 July, the band supported Dirty Pretty Things for the last time at the Hackney Empire in London which saw Glasvegas join the headliners for an encore and on 23 July 2007 another notable first was the band's TV appearance on Death Disco TV in London at The Cuckoo Club alongside Carl Barât and Milburn.

Constant gigging throughout the summer saw the band's fan base grow and during the summer of 2007 the band's demo's started to pick up radio airplay in the United States via a St. Louis-based Internet Radio Station called IChannel. On 22 August 2007, the band travelled once again down to London for some more gigs and while in London the band commissioned their first professional press shots. These photographs were taken by professional photographer Peter Mallet and are still widely used by the press today even though they show the old band line-up. They were taken at Vauxhall Cross and the train station at the Elephant and Castle. That same night the band played at Death Disco in London. In the crowd was Tim Jonze, who came along to the gig. He was so impressed by the band's performance that he offered to release their next record despite never having released one before. The band also offered to help in this venture and within a few days Sane Man Recordings was born; the aim was to release 1000 copies of "Daddy's Gone" on 7" vinyl by November 2007.

Prior to the release of the single, Tim Jonze attended the In the City Music Festival in October 2007 and brought several copies of the forthcoming single along with a view to previewing it. According to Tim, he played the single after a keynote speech at a very well attended convention at the festival. The impact of the song was immediate with several label heads making enquiries about the song (and the artist) there and then. One of the most immediate consequences of the buzz generated at "In The City" was Ian Brown asking Glasvegas to support him on several dates in late October 2007. Prior to these support dates Glasvegas announced their intention to play two live shows in Glasgow on consecutive nights (Saturday and Sunday; 13 and 14 October 2007 at the now defunct Barfly, Glasgow). NME chose to review Glasvegas for the very first time in their Radar section and review the forthcoming single "Daddy's Gone/Flowers & Football Tops" which was chosen as the single of the week.

"Daddy's Gone" sold out and was voted the number two single of the year by NME even though the band had only produced 1000 copies.

=== Glasvegas and A Snowflake Fell (And It Felt Like a Kiss) (2008–2010) ===
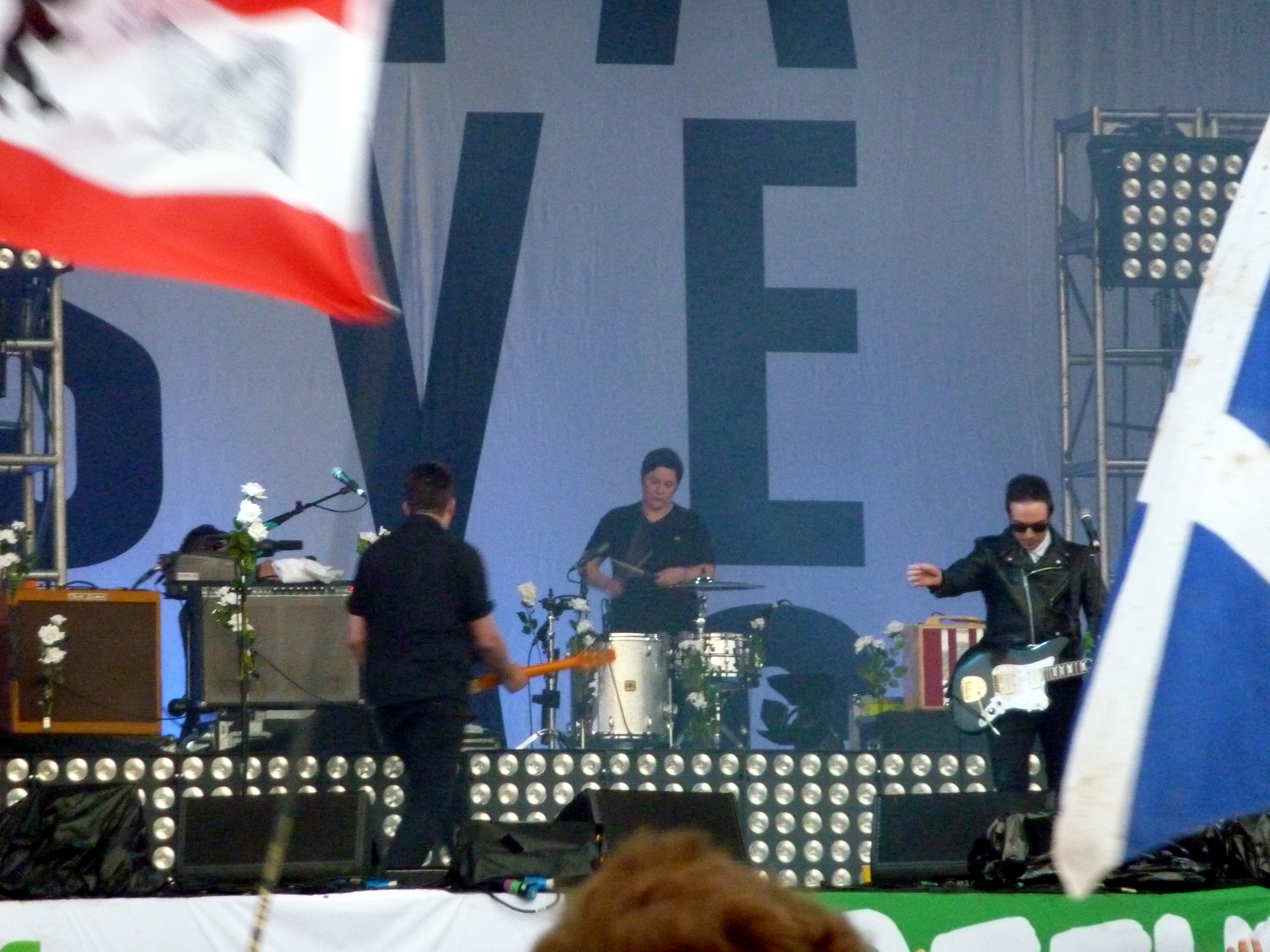
Glasvegas performing at the 2009 Glastonbury Festival

After releasing their second limited edition 7" single, "It's My Own Cheating Heart That Makes Me Cry", on 14 February 2008 via Sane Man Recordings, the band opted to sign to Columbia Records part of Sony. On 28 February 2008, Glasvegas won the Philip Hall Radar Award at the NME Awards. On 10 March 2008, Glasvegas travelled to the United States, where they recorded their eponymous debut album, Glasvegas, at Brooklyn Recording Studios, Brooklyn, New York. The album was co-produced by James Allan and Rich Costey. Glasvegas also filmed the video for their first single "Geraldine" in Brooklyn on 30 April 2008. On return to the UK at the beginning of May 2008, the band embarked on a touring schedule that would continue for over 16 months. On 23 June 2008, Glasvegas released their first Columbia single "Geraldine" which debuted at No. 16 on the UK singles chart. The summer of 2008 also saw the band make their debut at Glastonbury Festival playing the John Peel Stage on 27 June 2008. On 12 July 2008, Glasvegas played at T in the Park in the Futures Tent.

Further debut festival appearances in the summer of 2008 took place at Oxegen in Ireland and on consecutive days on 18 and 19 July 2008 at the Benicassim Music Festival in Barcelona and Madrid in Spain. On 20 July 2008, the band played Latitude Festival. On 13 August 2008, Glasvegas were invited as opening support to Muse at Marlay Park on the outskirts of Dublin, and the following day saw the band play their first support with Kings of Leon at the Brixton Academy. On 25 August, Glasvegas released their second Columbia single "Daddy's Gone" which debuted at No. 12 on the UK Singles Chart. On 30 August 2008, the band played the last ever Hydro Connect Festival near Inveraray in Scotland.

The band's self-titled debut album, Glasvegas, was released on 8 September 2008 and debuted at No.2 on the UK Album Chart. Even though their debut album sold almost 60,000 copies in the first week they were denied a No.1 by Metallica. The NME declared, "If The Libertines defined the start of the decade and Arctic Monkeys its middle, then Glasvegas are almost certainly going to define its end and beyond." Their debut album went on to enjoy success in the UK (where it went Platinum) and in Sweden (where it went Gold). The impact of the band in the UK and success of their debut album did not go unnoticed in North America, where the band toured six times between October 2008 and September 2009. The band have mentioned on many occasions during interviews of their commitment to making the breakthrough in the US and Canada. On 6 October 2008, the band started recording a Christmas-themed second album, A Snowflake Fell (And It Felt Like a Kiss), with a view to releasing it in time for Christmas 2008. Initial recording began at the Electric Lady Studios before the band moved to a Transylvanian Castle in Brasov, Romania. It was the band's intention to release a full album containing ten brand new tracks but due to their tight schedule they could only complete six tracks and the album instead became an EP. It was released on 1 December 2008 as a limited edition standalone CD and was also released as a Special Edition CD Box Set alongside their debut album, Glasvegas. Throughout 2008 and 2009 the band embarked on a world tour, appearing at various festivals, including support slots for Oasis, U2 and Kings of Leon. Glasvegas were nominated for the 2009 Mercury Music Prize, however lead singer James Allan disappeared just days before the Awards Ceremony on 8 September 2009. He went missing for a total of five days before eventually turning up safe and well in New York.

=== Euphoric Heartbreak (2010–2012) ===
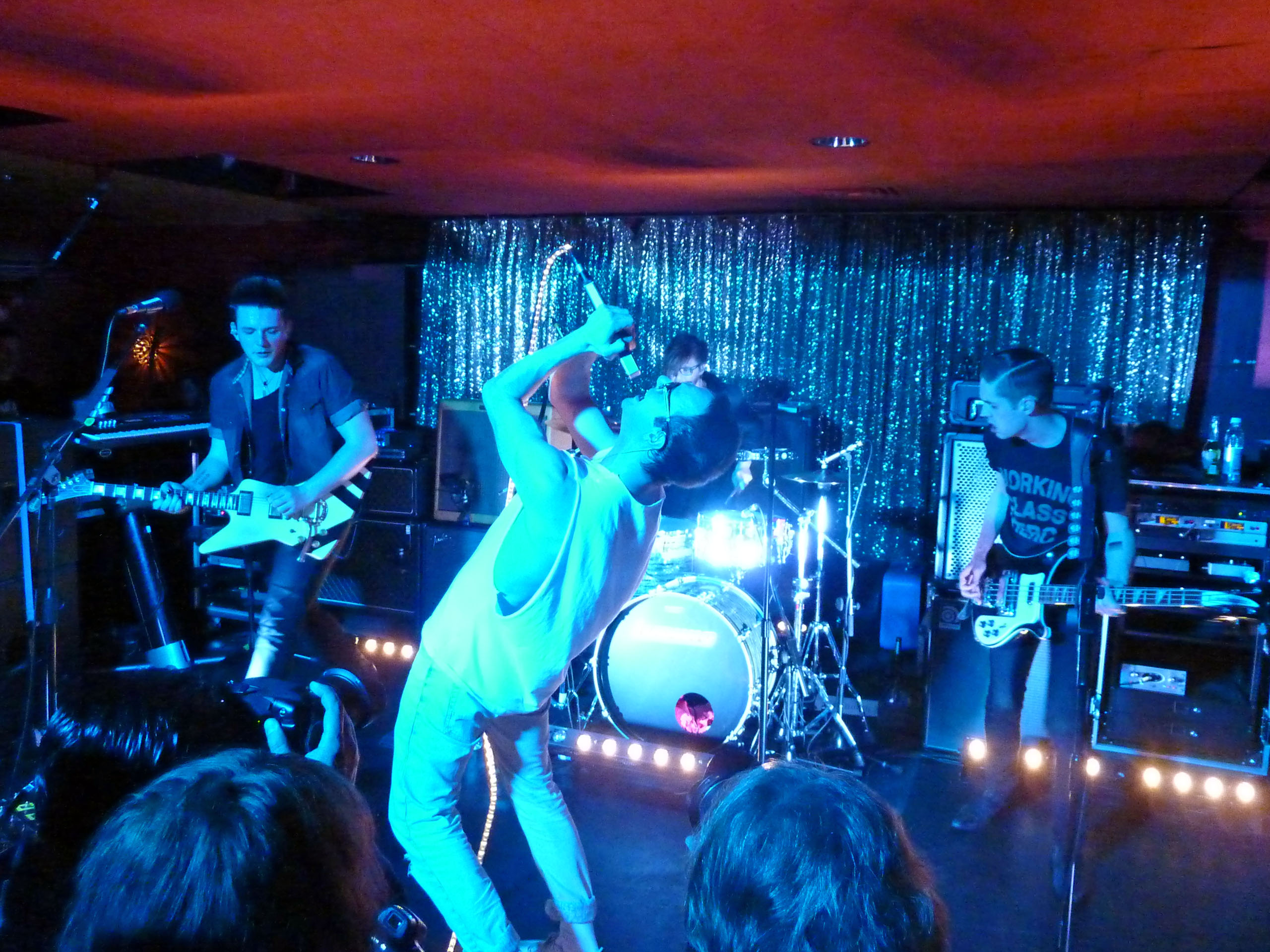
Glasvegas performing in Germany, 2011

In January 2010, Glasvegas moved to California and set up a studio in a beach house in Santa Monica where for over five months they demoed, tracked and recorded most of their second album, Euphoric Heartbreak. Santa Monica and its location on Southern California's West Coast had a massive influence on the sound and feel of the new songs. During this period in Santa Monica, Caroline McKay chose to leave the band before demoing and any recording began, officially leaving on 25 March 2010 citing personal reasons. The remaining band members stayed in Santa Monica until early May 2010 before returning to Scotland with an album's worth of new material. After a break over the summer, the band headed south to the Assault & Battery 2, a tracking and mix studio in London, with producer Flood through September, October and November 2010. Further post-production took place at the Castle of Doom studios in Glasgow through December 2010 and January 2011. On 14 December 2010, the band announced the appointment of a new drummer, Jonna Löfgren from Boden in Sweden.

The album was finished a year to the day that the band arrived at the Santa Monica Beach House. Glasvegas opened 2011 with an intimate 8 date tour of Scotland which took the band to places in Scotland that are normally missed out by touring bands. The tour took in Kirkwall, Wick, Forres, Oban, Dunoon, Troon, Hawick and Dunfermline. The band announced the tour to ensure that Scotland would be the first to hear the new music. The tour received positive critical reviews with Simon Price of The Independent on Sunday quoting that "Glasvegas are still – and we desperately need this right now – a band to believe in".

The songs delivered by Glasvegas were a marked departure from the debut album. The marketing campaign kicked off in January 2011 with a free track giveaway and the track chosen was the second track on the album "The World Is Yours". To give the fans more than just a free giveaway the band also created an "Album Trailer Movie" as well. On 4 April 2011 the band released their second album, Euphoric Heartbreak. The album reached No.10 in the UK and No.1 in Sweden. The album received mixed reviews from critics. It was not as commercially successful as the band's debut album, selling about ten percent of that album's sales. Several months later the band and their record label officially parted company on 4 August 2011.

After the release of Euphoric Heartbreak, the band embarked on their biggest headline European tour to date in April/May 2011. After the band's academy tour of Europe and the UK, the band left for their seventh tour of the United States in June 2011 playing to venues in New York City, Toronto and Los Angeles. On return to the UK the band played at Rockness in Scotland followed by a headline appearance on the John Peel Stage. Several more festival appearances including a slot at Where The Action Is in Gothenburg, Sweden saw the band round off June 2011. In July 2011, the band toured Australia for the first time playing three shows at The Rosemount Hotel in Perth, The Metro in Sydney and The Hi-Fi in Melbourne before making a festival appearance at Splendour in the Grass held at Woodford 45 miles north west of Brisbane. The band were also invited to the set of Neighbours by the TV producers which was located just outside Melbourne and spent the day there meeting the cast and crew and were thrilled to be served by Tom Oliver (Lou Carpenter) at Harold's. The band also made their second trip to Japan to play the Fuji Rock Festival and then rounded off the summer by headlining the first ever Famous Grouse Music Festival and playing the V Festival for the first time. In October 2011 Glasvegas embarked on a successful tour of the UK and Ireland starting in Cork, then London and then working their way north via Manchester, Sheffield and York eventually ending with a homecoming gig at the ABC Glasgow on Halloween.

=== Later...When the TV Turns to Static (2012–2014) ===
Glasvegas chose Sweden to showcase brand new demos from their (as yet untitled) third album and they announced a small run of dates in Sweden and the UK at the end of March 2012, and beginning of April. The band played to over 4,500 fans over four days in Sweden with visits to Malmö, Stockholm, Uppsala and Umeå. They also played three sell-out shows in London, Liverpool and Glasgow. In May they played the Camden Crawl festival at Koko in London as special guests of XFM. The band also announced on their official website that they had been invited to play in China with two dates, one in Shanghai and another in Beijing in May 2012. The band also played several major European festivals across the summer of 2012. During the summer of 2012 the band started the tracking and recording of all their demos at the Gorbals Sound Studios in Glasgow and the album was completed at the end of 2012. The band rounded off the year with a small intimate sell-out tour of the UK in December called "The Crying Onion Tour" where they showcased several new tracks from their forthcoming album Later...When the TV Turns to Static.

On 24 November 2012, the band announced that they would release their third album Later...When the TV Turns to Static in early autumn 2013. The band played a one-off gig date in Kilmarnock on 2 February 2013 where they headlined the Kilmarnock Edition Festival. The video for the band's first single "I'd Rather Be Dead (Than Be With You)" was posted on their official website on 18 March. The new single was released on 22 April 2013 as a digital download and as a limited edition 7" white vinyl. The limited edition vinyl became ever more collectible as it was the band's first release on their own label Go Wow Records and after the band's new record deal with BMG it would be the last Glasvegas release for quite some time. Rick Fulton (who gave the band their first ever review in 2004) described the new single as "gorgeous, simple, devastating. An incredible return to form from one of Scotland's truly great storytellers." On 27 March 2013, the band returned to play a one-off charity gig at the iconic King Tut's Wah Wah Hut.

In June 2013 the band announced that for the second time in their careers they had signed a worldwide major record deal with one of the world's biggest music companies; BMG. The first release via BMG was the single "If". The track was released on 8 July 2013. A music video to accompany the release of "If" was first released onto YouTube on the same day. The video features William Shatner and is Glasvegas' take on The Old Grey Whistle Test. "We played on the Late Show with Craig Ferguson in LA a couple of years ago and William Shatner introduced us as he is a fan of the band," Allan said. "We thought it would be a cool thing to add in for the new video since it also has a 'late show' theme. It's a simple live performance by the band with an abstract part in the middle where it looks like the video has been taped over with random visuals. The video has a filter that we wanted to put on it just to make it look even more like you were watching a recording on VCR. Old school!" The band released their third album Later...When the TV Turns to Static in September 2013. It received generally favourable reviews from critics stalling at No.41 in the UK Charts. Later...When The TV Turns To Static was released in three formats. Standard CD, Heavyweight White Vinyl and Deluxe Almanac. The Deluxe Almanac is presented with the iconic chevron foil embossed on a hardback almanac bound in linen with 40 stitched-in pages and ribboned page keeper. The Deluxe Almanac was conceived by James Allan in its entirety. The band released a third single; the title track "Later...When the TV Turns to Static" to promote the fact that 30 min of footage contained within the Deluxe Almanac DVD was broadcast by Sky Arts.

In 2014 the band undertook another tour of Europe with four dates in Germany where the album has been well received. The band also performed in Poland for the first time since 2009 and also performed for the very first time in the cities of Prague and Vilnius. In February & March 2014 the band embarked on their eight tour of North America taking in 13 cities across 19 days. The band also appeared on The Late Late Show on 4 March for the second time in their careers, performing the album track "All I Want Is My Baby".

=== Godspeed (2020–present) ===
On 25 June 2020, Glasvegas announced that drummer Jonna Löfgren had amicably parted ways with the band. She had missed several recent Glasvegas shows due to other commitments, and the band acknowledged that she would continue to be in high demand for her talents. The group will search for a new drummer to replace her.

On 14 August 2020, Glasvegas released their first single in seven years called "Keep Me a Space". The single is taken from their fourth studio album, Godspeed, which was released on 2 April 2021 by the band's own label Go Wow Records. In March 2021, they issued the single "Shake the Cage (für Theo)".

== Band members ==
Current members

- James Allan – vocals, rhythm guitar (2003–present)
- Rab Allan – lead guitar, backing vocals (2003–present)
- Paul Donoghue – bass guitar (2003–present)

Touring members

- Chris Dickie – drums (2019–present)

Past members

- Jonna Löfgren – drums (2010–2020)
- Caroline McKay – drums (2005–2010)
- Ryan Ross – drums (2003–2004)

== Discography ==
Studio albums

- Glasvegas (2008)
- Euphoric Heartbreak (2011)
- Later...When the TV Turns to Static (2013)
- Godspeed (2021)
- Airy Fairy (2027)

== Awards ==
Glasvegas received three nominations for the 2008 Swedish Rockbjornen awards: Best International Act, Best International Album for Glasvegas and Best International Song for "Geraldine". In Q magazine's list of the Top 50 Albums of 2008, Glasvegas was voted the fifth best album of the year.
