= James Allan (musician) =

Scottish singer-songwriter (born 1979)

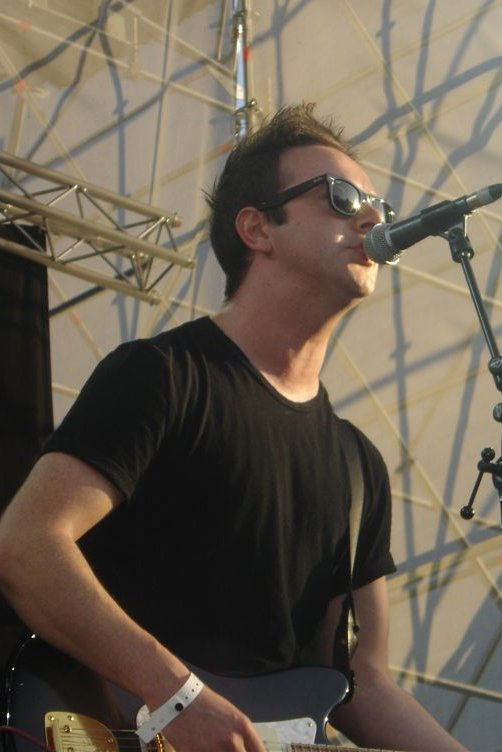

Background information
- Born: James Allan; 21 September 1979 (age 47)
- Origin: Dalmarnock, Glasgow, Scotland
- Genre: Indie rock
- Occupation: Singer-songwriter
- Instruments: Vocals, guitar
- Years active: 2003 – present
- Label: Columbia
- Member of: Glasvegas
Association football career
- Position: Winger
Youth career
- Abronhill United
Senior career*
Years	Team	Apps	(Gls)
1997–1999	Falkirk	2	(0)
1999–2001	Cowdenbeath	24	(3)
2001–2002	East Fife	33	(2)
2002–2003	Queen's Park	26	(4)
2003–2004	Gretna	6	(0)
2004–2005	Stirling Albion	9	(0)
2004–2006	Dumbarton	16	(0)
Total		116	(9)
- * Club domestic league appearances and goals

James Allan (born 21 September 1979) is a Scottish musician and former professional footballer who played as a winger. He is the lead singer and guitarist of the rock band Glasvegas.

== Early and personal life ==
Born in Dalmarnock, Glasgow, he attended the city's St Mungo's Academy. His sister Denise is the band's co-manager. Their cousin is Glasvegas bandmate/guitarist Rab Allan.

== Football career ==
Allan played as a winger for Falkirk, Cowdenbeath, East Fife, Queen's Park, Gretna, Stirling Albion and Dumbarton, making 116 appearances in the Scottish Football League. He was part of the Cowdenbeath squad that won promotion as runners up in the 2000–01 Scottish Third Division.

== Music career ==
During his football career, Allan decided to write songs and form a band. After touring Scotland for several years Glasvegas released four singles, before eventually being signed to Columbia. His songs deal with social issues such as psychopathic fathers ("Daddy's Gone"), murder ("Flowers & Football Tops") and the challenges of social work ("Geraldine"). He also wrote about homosexuality ("I Feel Wrong").

On 8 September 2009, a Tuesday, bandmates Rab Allan and Paul Donoghue announced that James Allan had been missing since the previous Friday, which resulted in a no-show at the Mercury Prize awards ceremony. However, he made a call to the band's manager on 9 September 2009 that he was safe and well in New York, where Glasvegas were about to embark upon a US tour supporting Kings of Leon. It is thought that the lack of communication sourced from Allan being without a mobile phone for six months, according to bandmates.

Allan cites Elvis Presley and Phil Spector as his main influences. He also says that Ian McCulloch of Echo and the Bunnymen is one of his inspirations.
