= Manic Street Preachers discography =

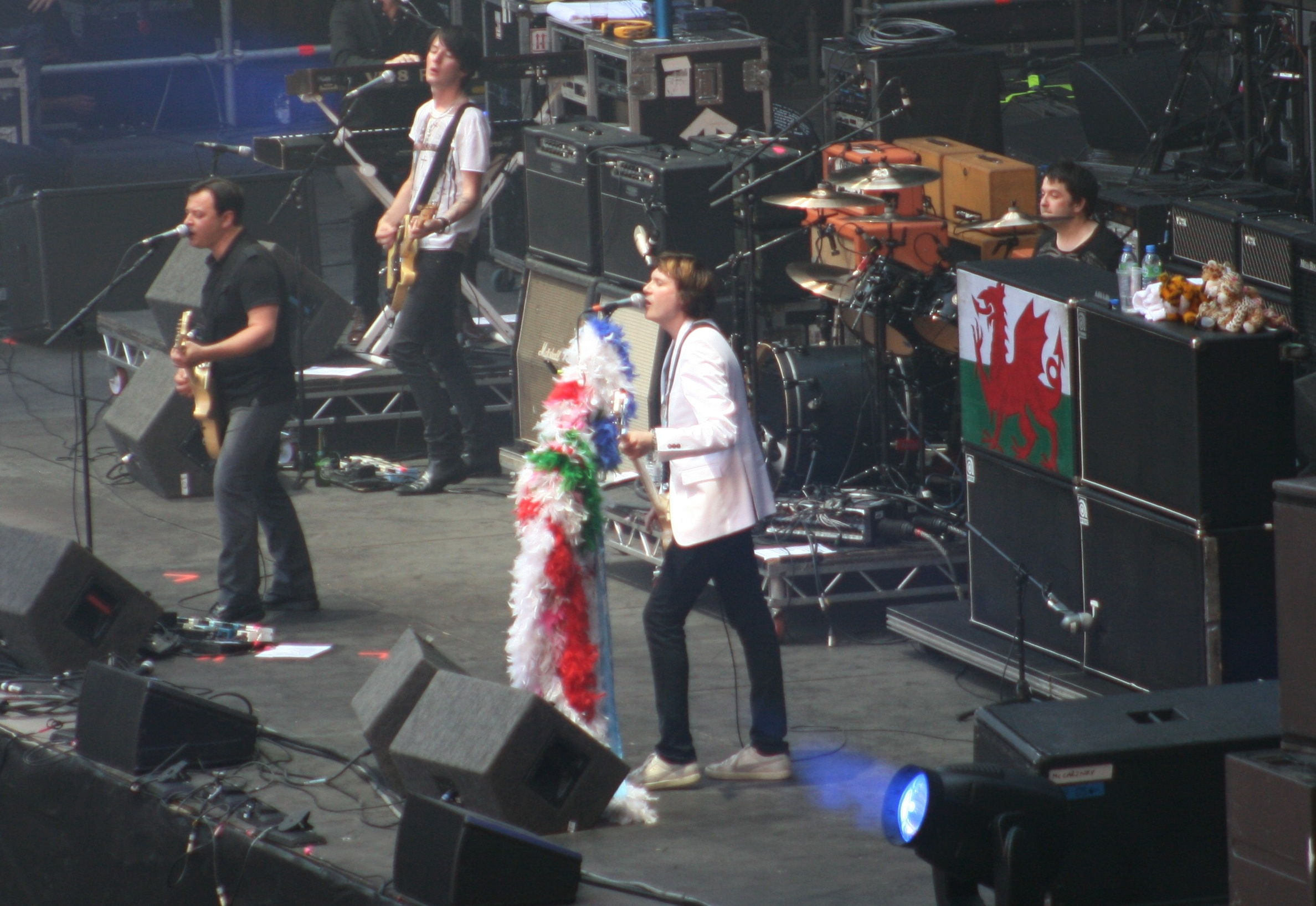
- Manic Street Preachers performing live in Cardiff in June 2010
- Studio albums: 15
- Extended plays: 9
- Live albums: 1
- Compilation albums: 4
- Singles: 66
- B-sides: 203
- Video albums: 5
- Music videos: 78
- Box sets: 1
- Deluxe reissues: 10
- Other appearances: 21

Manic Street Preachers are an alternative rock band formed in 1986 in Blackwood, Wales, UK. Their discography consists of 15 studio albums, one live album, four compilation albums, one box set, 10 deluxe reissues, two UK chart-eligible EPs, seven other EPs, 59 UK chart-eligible singles, seven other singles, 203 B-sides, five video albums, and 78 music videos, plus appearances on various artist compilations.

For singles, the band has a record 34 consecutive UK Top 40 hits, including two number ones with 1998's "If You Tolerate This Your Children Will Be Next" and 2000's "The Masses Against the Classes", with a total of 97 weeks in the Top 40. This run started with 1991's "Stay Beautiful", which peaked at number 40, and ended with 2010's "(It's Not War) Just the End of Love", which peaked at number 28. In addition, all 19 singles from 1996's "A Design for Life" to 2007's "Indian Summer" made the Top 20 in the UK. Overall, the band has spent 179 weeks in the UK Singles Chart, with the longest unbroken chart run being 17 weeks for "If You Tolerate This Your Children Will Be Next".

For albums, the most successful is Everything Must Go (1996), which spent 104 weeks on the UK Albums Chart, with 102 of those in the Top 75. This Is My Truth Tell Me Yours (1998) was the band's first number one album, enjoying 74 weeks in the chart. All 15 of the band's studio albums have charted within the Top 15, with the lowest being Generation Terrorists (1992) and Lifeblood (2004), both of which peaked at number 13. All of the Manic Street Preachers' studio albums from Send Away the Tigers (2007) onwards have gone Top 5 in the UK, with The Ultra Vivid Lament (2021) becoming their first number one album in 23 years. The band has a record of 240 weeks in the UK Albums Chart, 145 of those spent in the Top 40. Outside the UK, the band has been most successful in Ireland and Finland, reaching number one in those countries, as well as in Sweden.

== Albums ==
=== Studio albums ===
List of studio albums, with selected chart positions
Title	Details	Peak chart positions										Certifications
Title	Details	UK	BEL	FIN	GER	IRL	JPN	NLD	NZL	SCO	SWI	Certifications
Generation Terrorists	Released: 10 February 1992; Label: Columbia	13	—	—	—	—	60	—	—	13	—	BPI: Gold
Gold Against the Soul	Released: 21 June 1993; Label: Columbia	8	—	—	95	—	32	—	—	5	—	BPI: Gold
The Holy Bible	Released: 29 August 1994; Label: Epic	6	—	—	—	—	48	—	—	9	—	BPI: Gold
Everything Must Go	Released: 20 May 1996; Label: Epic	2	—	29	—	12	50	63	29	2	—	BPI: 3× Platinum
This Is My Truth Tell Me Yours	Released: 14 September 1998; Label: Epic/Virgin	1	32	1	27	1	27	24	11	1	47	BPI: 3× Platinum; GLF: Gold; IFPI FIN: Gold; IFPI NOR: Gold; NVPI: Gold
Know Your Enemy	Released: 19 March 2001; Label: Epic	2	19	3	13	5	26	39	21	2	40	BPI: Gold
Lifeblood	Released: 1 November 2004; Label: Epic	13	72	15	56	15	47	65	—	8	81	BPI: Silver
Send Away the Tigers	Released: 7 May 2007; Label: Columbia	2	57	10	50	4	39	35	33	2	43	BPI: Gold; IRMA: Gold
Journal for Plague Lovers	Released: 18 May 2009; Label: Columbia	3	69	23	49	6	24	88	35	3	30	BPI: Silver
Postcards from a Young Man	Released: 20 September 2010; Label: Columbia	3	55	20	65	13	36	62	—	2	87	BPI: Gold
Rewind the Film	Released: 16 September 2013; Label: Columbia	4	74	27	31	5	77	62	—	4	51	BPI: Silver
Futurology	Released: 7 July 2014; Label: Columbia	2	57	17	33	8	36	42	—	5	51	
Resistance Is Futile	Released: 13 April 2018; Label: Columbia	2	45	—	20	5	39	73	— (Note: Resistance Is Futile did not enter the NZ Top 40 Albums Chart, but peaked at number one on the NZ Heatseeker Albums Chart.)	1	18	BPI: Silver
The Ultra Vivid Lament	Released: 10 September 2021; Label: Columbia	1	62	39	12	9	58	—	—	1	46	
Critical Thinking	Released: 14 February 2025; Label: Columbia	2	80	41	27	25	37	—	—	1	18	
"—" denotes a recording that did not chart or was not released in that territory.

=== Live albums ===
List of live albums, with selected chart positions
Title	Details	Peak chart positions
Title	Details	UK
The Holy Bible Live	Released: 23 October 2026; Label: Columbia	10

=== Compilation albums ===
List of compilation albums, with selected chart positions
Title	Details	Peak chart positions										Certifications
Title	Details	UK	DEN	FIN	BEL	IRL	JPN	NLD	NOR	SCO	SPN	Certifications
Forever Delayed	Released: 28 October 2002; Label: Sony; Available as a 1-CD standard edition and a 2-CD special edition	4	14	7	36	7	68	67	32	4	—	BPI: 2× Platinum
Lipstick Traces (A Secret History of Manic Street Preachers)	Released: 14 July 2003; Label: Sony	11	—	28	—	21	—	—	—	6	—	
National Treasures – The Complete Singles	Released: 31 October 2011; Label: Columbia	10	—	—	—	30	125	—	—	7	70	BPI: Gold
Sleep Next to Plastic	Released: 5 July 2022; Label: Sony	—	—	—	—	—	—	—	—	—	—	
"—" denotes a recording that did not chart or was not released in that territory.

=== Box sets ===
List of box sets
Title	Details
Six Singles from Generation Terrorists	Released: 13 September 1997; Label: Epic

=== Deluxe reissues ===
List of deluxe reissues
Title	Details
The Holy Bible (10th Anniversary Edition)	Released: 6 December 2004; Label: Epic
Everything Must Go (10th Anniversary Edition)	Released: 6 November 2006; Label: Sony
Generation Terrorists (20th Anniversary Edition)	Released: 5 November 2012; Label: Sony
The Holy Bible (20th Anniversary Edition)	Released: 8 December 2014; Label: Sony
Everything Must Go (20th Anniversary Edition)	Released: 20 May 2016; Label: Sony
Send Away the Tigers (10th Anniversary Edition)	Released: 12 May 2017; Label: Sony
This Is My Truth Tell Me Yours (20th Anniversary Edition)	Released: 7 December 2018; Label: Sony
Gold Against the Soul (Special Edition)	Released: 12 June 2020; Label: Sony
Know Your Enemy (Special Edition)	Released: 9 September 2022; Label: Sony
Lifeblood (20th Anniversary Edition)	Released: 12 April 2024; Label: Sony

== UK chart-eligible singles and EPs ==
List of singles and EPs, with selected chart positions
Title	Year	Peak chart positions										Certifications	Album
Title	Year	UK	AUS	FIN	BEL	IRE	NLD	NOR	NZL	SCO	SWE	Certifications	Album
"Suicide Alley"	1988	—	—	—	—	—	—	—	—	—	—		Underground Rockers Volume 2 (Various artists)
New Art Riot E.P.	1990	—	—	—	—	—	—	—	—	—	—		Non-album tracks
"Motown Junk"	1991	94	—	—	—	—	—	—	—	—	—		Non-album tracks
"You Love Us" (Heavenly version)	1991	62	—	—	—	—	—	—	—	—	—		Non-album track, re-recorded for Generation Terrorists
"Stay Beautiful"	1991	40	186	—	—	—	—	—	—	51	—		Generation Terrorists
"Love's Sweet Exile" / "Repeat" (double A-side)	1991	26	—	—	—	—	—	—	—	56	—		Generation Terrorists
"You Love Us" (Sony version)	1992	16	—	—	—	—	—	—	—	47	—		Generation Terrorists
"Slash 'n' Burn"	1992	20	158	—	—	—	—	—	—	52	—		Generation Terrorists
"Motorcycle Emptiness"	1992	17	151	—	35	—	21	—	35	39	—	BPI: Gold	Generation Terrorists
"Theme From M.A.S.H. (Suicide Is Painless)"	1992	7	139	—	—	12	—	—	40	—	21		Ruby Trax (Various artists)
"Little Baby Nothing"	1992	29	—	—	—	—	—	—	—	49	—		Generation Terrorists
"From Despair to Where"	1993	25	—	—	—	—	—	—	—	—	—		Gold Against the Soul
"La Tristesse Durera (Scream to a Sigh)"	1993	22	—	—	—	—	—	—	—	—	—		Gold Against the Soul
"Roses in the Hospital"	1993	15	—	—	—	—	—	—	—	—	—		Gold Against the Soul
Life Becoming a Landslide E.P.	1994	36	—	—	—	—	—	—	—	—	—		Gold Against the Soul
"Faster" / "P.C.P." (double A-side)	1994	16	—	—	—	—	—	—	—	81	—		The Holy Bible
"Revol"	1994	22	—	—	—	—	—	—	—	25	—		The Holy Bible
"She Is Suffering"	1994	25	—	—	—	—	—	—	—	33	—		The Holy Bible
"A Design for Life"	1996	2	50	—	—	17	—	—	48	2	—	BPI: Platinum	Everything Must Go
"Everything Must Go"	1996	5	—	18	—	—	—	—	—	5	—		Everything Must Go
"Kevin Carter"	1996	9	—	—	—	—	—	—	—	8	—		Everything Must Go
"Australia"	1996	7	150	—	—	—	—	—	—	5	—		Everything Must Go
"Stay Beautiful" (reissue)^{[A]}	1997	52	—	—	—	—	—	—	—	—	—		Six Singles from Generation Terrorists
"Love's Sweet Exile" / "Repeat" (double A-side, reissue)^{[A]}	1997	55	—	—	—	—	—	—	—	—	—		Six Singles from Generation Terrorists
"You Love Us" (Sony version, reissue)^{[A]}	1997	49	—	—	—	—	—	—	—	—	—		Six Singles from Generation Terrorists
"Slash 'n' Burn" (reissue)^{[A]}	1997	54	—	—	—	—	—	—	—	—	—		Six Singles from Generation Terrorists
"Motorcycle Emptiness" (reissue)^{[A]}	1997	41	—	—	—	—	—	—	—	—	—		Six Singles from Generation Terrorists
"Little Baby Nothing" (reissue)^{[A]}	1997	50	—	—	—	—	—	—	—	—	—		Six Singles from Generation Terrorists
"If You Tolerate This Your Children Will Be Next"	1998	1	49	—	63	3	62	19	44	3	21	BPI: Platinum; RMNZ: Gold	This Is My Truth Tell Me Yours
"The Everlasting"	1998	11	160	—	—	22	47	—	—	9	—		This Is My Truth Tell Me Yours
"You Stole the Sun from My Heart"	1999	5	97	—	—	20	94	—	—	5	—	BPI: Silver	This Is My Truth Tell Me Yours
"Tsunami"	1999	11	—	13	—	24	—	—	—	12	—		This Is My Truth Tell Me Yours
"The Masses Against the Classes"	2000	1	—	4	—	7	—	12	—	1	—		Non-album track
"So Why So Sad" ^{[B]}	2001	8	113	4	—	16	88	—	—	7	26		Know Your Enemy
"Found That Soul" ^{[B]}	2001	9	—	—	—	17	—	—	—	9	—		Know Your Enemy
"Ocean Spray"	2001	15	—	—	—	28	—	—	—	15	—		Know Your Enemy
"Let Robeson Sing"	2001	19	—	—	—	—	—	—	—	22	—		Know Your Enemy
"There by the Grace of God"	2002	6	—	9	—	16	—	—	—	7	—		Forever Delayed
"The Love of Richard Nixon"	2004	2	—	—	—	17	—	—	—	4	—		Lifeblood
"Empty Souls"	2005	2	—	—	—	18	—	—	—	5	—		Lifeblood
"Your Love Alone Is Not Enough"	2007	2	—	—	57	7	78	5	20	1	48	BPI: Silver	Send Away the Tigers
"Autumnsong"	2007	10	—	—	—	43	—	—	—	3	—		Send Away the Tigers
"Indian Summer"	2007	22	—	—	—	—	—	—	—	6	—		Send Away the Tigers
"Umbrella" (unofficial release)	2008	47	—	—	—	—	—	—	—	—	—		NME Awards 2008 (Various artists)
"(It's Not War) Just the End of Love"	2010	28	—	—	88	—	—	—	—	27	—		Postcards from a Young Man
"Some Kind of Nothingness"	2010	44	—	—	—	—	—	—	—	42	—		Postcards from a Young Man
"Postcards from a Young Man"	2011	54	—	—	—	—	—	—	—	58	—		Postcards from a Young Man
"This Is the Day"	2011	144	—	—	—	—	—	—	—	—	—		National Treasures – The Complete Singles
"Show Me the Wonder"	2013	77	—	—	132	—	—	—	—	79	—		Rewind the Film
"Anthem for a Lost Cause"	2013	200	—	—	—	—	—	—	—	—	—		Rewind the Film
"Walk Me to the Bridge"	2014	—	—	—	—	—	—	—	—	—	—		Futurology
"Futurology"	2014	—	—	—	—	—	—	—	—	—	—		Futurology
"Together Stronger (C'mon Wales)"	2016	—	—	—	—	—	—	—	—	—	—		Non-album track
"International Blue"	2017	—	—	—	91	—	—	—	—	78	—		Resistance Is Futile
"Distant Colours"	2018	—	—	—	—	—	—	—	—	93	—		Resistance Is Futile
"Dylan & Caitlin"	2018	—	—	—	—	—	—	—	—	—	—		Resistance Is Futile
"Liverpool Revisited"	2018	—	—	—	—	—	—	—	—	—	—		Resistance Is Futile
"Hold Me Like a Heaven"	2018	—	—	—	—	—	—	—	—	—	—		Resistance Is Futile
"People Give In"	2018	—	—	—	—	—	—	—	—	91	—		Resistance Is Futile
"Orwellian"	2021	—	—	—	—	—	—	—	—	—	—		The Ultra Vivid Lament
"The Secret He Had Missed"	2021	83	—	—	—	—	—	—	—	—	—		The Ultra Vivid Lament
"Rosebud"	2022	—	—	—	—	—	—	—	—	—	—		Know Your Enemy (2022 Reissue)
"Studies in Paralysis"	2022	—	—	—	—	—	—	—	—	—	—		Know Your Enemy (2022 Reissue)
"Decline & Fall"	2024	—	—	—	—	—	—	—	—	—	—		Critical Thinking
"Hiding in Plain Sight"	2024	—	—	—	—	—	—	—	—	—	—		Critical Thinking
"People Ruin Paintings"	2025	—	—	—	—	—	—	—	—	—	—		Critical Thinking
"Brushstrokes of Reunion"	2025	—	—	—	—	—	—	—	—	—	—		Critical Thinking
"—" denotes a recording that did not chart or was not released in that territory.

- A All six singles from Generation Terrorists (1991–1992) were reissued on 13 September 1997.
- B "So Why So Sad" and "Found That Soul" were two separate singles released on the same day (26 February 2001).

== Other singles and EPs ==
List of singles and EPs, with selected chart positions
Title	Year	Notes	Peak chart positions	Album
Title	Year	Notes	JPN	Album
"UK Channel Boredom"	1990	Free record with the March 1990 issues of Hopelessly Devoted and Goldmining fanzines	—	Non-album tracks
Feminine Is Beautiful	1991	Mail-order only	—	Non-album tracks
Stars and Stripes - Generation Terrorists US Mix	1992	Japan-only release	—	Generation Terrorists (US mix)
Done & Dusted	1994	Promo-only	—	The Holy Bible (remixes)
"Further Away"	1996	Japan-only releases	—	Everything Must Go
"Nobody Loved You"	1998	Japan-only releases	—	This Is My Truth Tell Me Yours
Know Our B-Sides	2001	Japan-only releases	—	Non-album tracks
Forever Delayed E.P.	2002	Japan-only releases	—	Forever Delayed
"Motorcycle Emptiness"	2003	Reissued in Finland and Germany with newly-recorded B-sides	—	Forever Delayed
God Save the Manics	2005	Given away free at the last show of the Lifeblood tour at Hammersmith Odeon on 19 April 2005	—	Non-album tracks
"Underdogs"	2007	Limited edition of 1000 copies	—	Send Away the Tigers
"The Ghosts of Christmas"	2007	Free download from the band's website	—	Non-album track
Journal for Plague Lovers Remixes	2009	iTunes-exclusive download	46	Journal for Plague Lovers (remixes)
"Let the Light Return"	2025	Sold exclusively on the band's website	—	Non-album track
"—" denotes a recording that did not chart or was not released in that territory.

== B-sides ==
Title	A-side
"1404"	"Autumnsong"
"4 Ever Delayed"	"Motorcycle Emptiness" (2003 Germany reissue)
"A Vision of Dead Desire"	"You Love Us" (Sony Version)
"A Design for Life" (Live)	"Australia"
"A Design for Life" (Stealth Sonic Orchestra Instrumental)	"A Design for Life"
"A Design for Life" (Stealth Sonic Orchestra Vocal)	"A Design for Life"
"Ain't Going Down"	"Slash 'n' Burn"
"All Alone Here"	"Empty Souls"
"Anorexic Rodin"	"Indian Summer"
"Anti Social Manifesto"	"Futurology"
"Are Mothers Saints"	"Life Becoming a Landslide"
"Askew Road"	"The Love of Richard Nixon"
"Australia" (Lionrock Remix)	"Australia"
"Automatik Teknicolour"	"There by the Grace of God"
"Autumnsong" (Acoustic)	"Autumnsong"
"Autumnsong" (Live)	"Autumnsong"
"Ballad of the Bangkok Novotel"	"Found That Soul"
"Black Garden"	"Everything Must Go"
"Black Holes for the Young" (ft. Sophie Ellis-Bextor)	"The Everlasting"
"Bored Out of My Mind"	"Motorcycle Emptiness"
"Boxes & Lists"	"Your Love Alone Is Not Enough"
"Bright Eyes" (orig. by Art Garfunkel)	"A Design for Life"
"Broken Up Again"	"Some Kind of Nothingness"
"Buildings for Dead People"	"Tsunami"
"Caldey"	"Walk Me to the Bridge"
"Can't Take My Eyes Off You" (orig. by Frankie Valli)	"Australia"
"Charles Windsor" (orig. by McCarthy)	"Life Becoming a Landslide"
"Close My Eyes"	"The Masses Against the Classes"
"Comfort Comes"	"Life Becoming a Landslide"
"Crucifix Kiss" (Live)	"Motorcycle Emptiness"
"Dead Passive"	"A Design for Life"
"Dead Trees and Traffic Islands"	"A Design for Life"
"Dead Yankee Drawl"	"Little Baby Nothing"
"Death of a Digital Ghost"	"Anthem for a Lost Cause"
"Democracy Coma"	"Love's Sweet Exile"/"Repeat"
"Didn't My Lord Deliver Daniel" (Traditional)	"Let Robeson Sing"
"Distractions"	"(It's Not War) Just the End of Love"
"Donkeys"	"Roses in the Hospital"
"Drug Drug Druggy" (Live)	"Revol"
"Dying Breeds"	"Empty Souls"
"Engage with Your Shadow"	"Postcards from a Young Man"
"Europa Geht Durch Mich" (Erol Alkan's Mesmerise Eins Rework)	"Walk Me to the Bridge"
"Europa Geht Durch Mich" (Erol Alkan's Mesmerise Zwei Rework)	"Walk Me to the Bridge"
"Everything Must Go" (Acoustic Version)	"Kevin Carter"
"Everything Must Go" (The Chemical Brothers Remix)	"Everything Must Go"
"Everything Must Go" (Stealth Sonic Orchestra Remix)	"Everything Must Go"
"Everything Must Go" (Stealth Sonic Orchestra Soundtrack)	"Everything Must Go"
"Everything Will Be"	"The Love of Richard Nixon"
"Everyone Knows/Nobody Cares"	"The Love of Richard Nixon"
"Evidence Against Myself"	"Some Kind of Nothingness"
"Failure Bound"	"Empty Souls"
"Faster" (Acoustic)	"Motorcycle Emptiness" (2003 Finland reissue)
"Faster" (The Chemical Brothers Dub Mix)	"She Is Suffering"; Done & Dusted
"Faster" (The Chemical Brothers Vocal Mix)	Done & Dusted "A Design for Life"
"Fear of Motion"	"Let Robeson Sing"
"Fearless Punk Ballad"	"Your Love Alone Is Not Enough"
"First Republic"	"Kevin Carter"
"Foggy Eyes" (orig. by Beat Happening)	"Indian Summer"
"Futurology" (R Seiliog Remix)	"Futurology"
"Groundhog Days"	"Ocean Spray"
"Hanging On"	"Everything Must Go"
"Happy Ending"	"There by the Grace of God"
"Heyday of the Blood"	"Indian Summer"
"Hibernation"	"From Despair to Where"
"Holding Patterns"	"International Blue"
"Hold Me Like A Heaven" (Public Broadcasting Remix)	"Hold Me Like A Heaven"
"Hold Me Like A Heaven" (Warm Digits Remix)	"Hold Me Like A Heaven"
"Horses Under Starlight"	"Kevin Carter"
"I Know the Numbers"	"(It's Not War) Just the End of Love"
"I'm Leaving You for Solitude"	"(It's Not War) Just the End of Love"
"If You Tolerate This Your Children Will Be Next" (David Holmes Remix)	"If You Tolerate This Your Children Will Be Next"
"If You Tolerate This Your Children Will Be Next" (Live)	"You Stole the Sun from My Heart"
"If You Tolerate This Your Children Will Be Next" (Massive Attack Remix)	"If You Tolerate This Your Children Will Be Next"
"Indian Summer" (Demo Version)	"Indian Summer"
"Inky Fingers"	"Postcards from a Young Man"
"International Blue" (Bluer Skies Version)	"International Blue"
"It's All Gone"	"There by the Grace of God"
"It's So Easy" (Live) (orig. by Guns N' Roses)	"You Love Us" (Sony Version)
"Johatsu"	"Let the Light Return"
"Just a Kid"	"Ocean Spray"
"Kevin Carter" (Busts Loose)	"Kevin Carter"
"Kevin Carter" (Live)	"If You Tolerate This Your Children Will Be Next"
"Kevin Carter" (Stealth Sonic Orchestra Remix)	"Kevin Carter"
"Kevin Carter" (Stealth Sonic Orchestra Soundtrack)	"Kevin Carter"
"Kiss My Eyes for Eternity"	"Postcards from a Young Man"
"Kodawari"	"Futurology"
"La Tristesse Durera (Scream to a Sigh)" (The Chemical Brothers Vocal Mix)	"She Is Suffering"
"La Tristesse Durera (Scream to a Sigh)" (The Chemical Brothers Dub Mix)	"She Is Suffering"
"La Tristesse Durera (Scream to a Sigh)" (Sunday Social Mix)	Done & Dusted
"Lady Lazarus"	"Indian Summer"
"Last Exit on Yesterday"	"New Art Riot"
"Let Robeson Sing" (Felix da Housecat Mix)	"Let Robeson Sing"
"Let Robeson Sing" (Ian Brown Mix)	"Let Robeson Sing"
"Let Robeson Sing" (Live)	"Let Robeson Sing"
"Life Becoming a Landslide" (Live)	"Revol"
"Litany"	"Empty Souls"
"Little Baby Nothing" (Acoustic)	"Motorcycle Emptiness" (2003 Finland and Germany reissue)
"Little Girl Lost"	"Your Love Alone Is Not Enough"
"Little Trolls"	"Ocean Spray"
"Locust Valley"	"Found That Soul"
"Lost Voices"	"(It's Not War) Just the End of Love"
"Love Letter to the Future"	"Your Love Alone Is Not Enough"
"Love Torn Us Under"	"She Is Suffering"
"Love's Sweet Exile" (Live)	"Revol"
"Masking Tape"	"Let Robeson Sing"
"Melancholyme"	"Show Me the Wonder"
"Midnight Sun"	"Postcards from a Young Man"
"Montana/Autumn/78"	"If You Tolerate This Your Children Will Be Next"
"Morning Comrades"	"Autumnsong"
"Motorcycle Emptiness" (Stealth Sonic Orchestra Remix)	"Australia"
"Motorcycle Emptiness" (Stealth Sonic Orchestra Soundtrack)	"Australia"
"Motown Junk" (Live Medley)	"Tsunami"
"Mr Carbohydrate"	"A Design for Life"
"Never Want Again"	"Little Baby Nothing"
"New Art Riot (In E Minor)" (Live)	"Faster"/"P.C.P."
"No Jubilees"	"Empty Souls"
"No One Knows What It's Like to Be Me"	"Everything Must Go"
"Ocean Spray" (Ellis Island Sound Remix)	"Ocean Spray"
"Ocean Spray" (Kinobe Remix)	"Ocean Spray"
"Ocean Spray" (Live)	"Ocean Spray"
"Ocean Spray" (Medicine Remix)	"Ocean Spray"
"Orwellian" (Gwenno Remix)	"Orwellian"
"Ostpolitik"	"(It's Not War) Just the End of Love"
"Patrick Bateman"	"La Tristesse Durera (Scream to a Sigh)"
"Pedestal"	"So Why So Sad"
"Prologue to History"	"If You Tolerate This Your Children Will Be Next"
"Quarantine (In My Place Of)"	"The Love of Richard Nixon"
"R.P. McMurphy"	"Stay Beautiful"
"R.P. McMurphy" (Live)	"Little Baby Nothing"
"Raindrops Keep Falling on My Head" (orig. by Burt Bacharach)	"Everything Must Go"
"Red Rubber"	"Some Kind of Nothingness"
"Red Sleeping Beauty" (orig. by McCarthy)	"Autumnsong"
"Repeat" (Live)	"La Tristesse Durera (Scream to a Sigh)"
"Rock and Roll Music" (orig. by Chuck Berry)	"The Masses Against the Classes"
"Roses in the Hospital" (51 Funk Salute mix)	"Roses in the Hospital"
"Roses in the Hospital" (ECG mix)	"Roses in the Hospital"
"Roses in the Hospital" (Filet-o-Gang mix)	"Roses in the Hospital"
"Roses in the Hospital" (Live)	"Revol"
"Roses in the Hospital" (O G Psychomental mix)	"Roses in the Hospital"
"Roses in the Hospital" (O G Psychovocal mix)	"Roses in the Hospital"
"Sculpture of Man"	"Faster"/"P.C.P."
"See It Like Sutherland"	"Anthem for a Lost Cause"
"Sepia"	"Kevin Carter"
"She Is Suffering" (Live at the O2)	"Anthem for a Lost Cause"
"Slash 'n' Burn" (Live)	"La Tristesse Durera (Scream to a Sigh)"
"Sleeping with the NME"	"Theme from M*A*S*H (Suicide Is Painless)"
"Slow Reflections/Strange Delays"	"Some Kind of Nothingness"
"Small Black Flowers That Grow in the Sky" (Live)	"The Everlasting"
"So Why So Sad" (The Avalanches remix)	"So Why So Sad"
"Socialist Serenade"	"You Stole the Sun from My Heart"
"Sorrow 16"	"Motown Junk" "Slash 'n' Burn"
"Soul Contamination"	"Stay Beautiful"
"Spectators of Suicide" (Heavenly Version)	"You Love Us" (Heavenly Version) "From Despair to Where"
"Star Lover"	"You Love Us" (Heavenly Version)
"Stay Beautiful" (Live)	"Love's Sweet Exile"/"Repeat"
"Stay with Me" (Live ft. Bernard Butler) (orig. by Faces)	"She Is Suffering"
"Strip It Down"	"New Art Riot"
"Strip It Down" (Live)	"You Love Us" (Heavenly Version)
"Take the Skinheads Bowling" (orig. by Camper van Beethoven)	"Australia"
"T.E. Lawrence on a Bike"	"Show Me the Wonder"
"Teenage 20/20"	"New Art Riot"
"Tennessee (I Get Low)"	"Suicide Alley"
"Tennessee" (Live)	"Little Baby Nothing"
"The Drowners" (Live ft. Bernard Butler) (orig. by Suede)	"She Is Suffering"
"The Everlasting" (Deadly Avenger Mix)	"The Everlasting"
"The Everlasting" (Stealth Sonic Orchestra Remix)	"The Everlasting"
"The Long Goodbye"	"Autumnsong"
"The Masses Against the Classes" (Live)	"Found That Soul"
"The Passing Show"	"Postcards from a Young Man"
"The Secret He Had Missed" (Piano Acoustic)	"The Secret He Had Missed"
"The Sound of Detachment"	"Walk Me to the Bridge"
"The Vorticists"	"Autumnsong"
"There by the Grace of God" (Saint Etienne Mix)	"There by the Grace of God"
"There by the Grace of God" (Starecase Mix)	"There by the Grace of God"
"Time Ain't Nothing" (orig. by Green on Red)	"Some Kind of Nothingness"
"Too Cold Here"	"Revol"
"Train in Vain" (Live) (orig. by The Clash)	"You Stole the Sun from My Heart"
"Tsunami" (Cornelius Remix)	"Tsunami"
"Tsunami" (Stereolab's Electron Ray Tube Mix)	"Tsunami"
"Tsunami" (Live at the O2)	"Show Me the Wonder"
"Under My Wheels" (Live) (orig. by Alice Cooper)	"Motorcycle Emptiness"
"Umbrella" (Acoustic)	"Umbrella"
"Umbrella" (Grand Slam Mix)	"Umbrella"
"Unstoppable Salvation"	"There by the Grace of God"
"Us Against You"	"Roses in the Hospital"
"Valley Boy"	"The Everlasting"
"Velocity Girl" (orig. by Primal Scream)	"Australia"
"Voodoo Polaroids"	"The Love of Richard Nixon"
"Walk Me to the Bridge" (Live from Ancienne Belgique, Brussels)	"Walk Me to the Bridge"
"We Her Majesty's Prisoners"	"Motown Junk" "You Love Us" (Sony Version)
"We Were Never Told"	"This Is the Day"
"Welcome to the Dead Zone"	"Your Love Alone Is Not Enough"
What Happened to the Blue Generation	"Show Me the Wonder"
"What's My Name" (Live) (orig. by The Clash)	"La Tristesse Durera (Scream to a Sigh)"
"Wrote for Luck" (orig. by Happy Mondays)	"Roses in the Hospital"
"You Know It's Going to Hurt"	"Indian Summer"
"You Love Us" (Live 1994)	"Revol"
"You Love Us" (Live 1992)	"Little Baby Nothing"
"You Stole the Sun from My Heart" (David Holmes Remix)	"You Stole the Sun from My Heart"
"You Stole the Sun from My Heart" (Live)	"So Why So Sad"
"You Stole the Sun from My Heart" (Mogwai Remix)	"You Stole the Sun from My Heart"
"Your Love Alone Is Not Enough" (James Solo Acoustic)	"Your Love Alone Is Not Enough"
"Your Love Alone Is Not Enough" (Nina Solo Acoustic)	"Your Love Alone Is Not Enough"

== Video albums ==
Year	Title	Venue	Format	Certifications (sales thresholds)
1997	Everything Live	NYNEX Arena, Manchester, England	VHS	BPI: Gold
2000	Leaving the 20th Century	Millennium Stadium, Cardiff, Wales	VHS and DVD	BPI: Gold
2001	Louder Than War	Karl Marx Theatre, Havana, Cuba	DVD	
2002	Forever Delayed	—	DVD	BPI: Gold
2015	No Manifesto	documentary	DVD and Blu-ray	

== Music videos ==
Year	Title	Director	Album/EP
1990	Strip It Down	unknown	New Art Riot E.P.
1991	Motown Junk (footage from Snub TV used as official music video)	Snub TV	Non-album single
1991	You Love Us (Heavenly version)	Tony van den Ende	Non-album single, re-recorded for Generation Terrorists
1991	Stay Beautiful	Walter Stern	Generation Terrorists
1991	Love's Sweet Exile	W.I.Z	Generation Terrorists
1991	You Love Us (Sony version)	W.I.Z	Generation Terrorists
1992	Slash n' Burn	Tony van den Ende	Generation Terrorists
1992	Motorcycle Emptiness	Martin Hall	Generation Terrorists
1992	Theme from M.A.S.H. (Suicide Is Painless)	Matthew Amos	Ruby Trax (Various Artists)
1992	Little Baby Nothing	Small & B Swells	Generation Terrorists
1993	From Despair to Where	Peter Scammel	Gold Against the Soul
1993	La Tristesse Durera (Scream to a Sigh)	Josh Taft	Gold Against the Soul
1993	Roses in the Hospital	Erik Zimmerman	Gold Against the Soul
1993	Life Becoming a Landslide	Martin Hall	Gold Against the Soul
1994	Faster	Tony van den Ende	The Holy Bible
1994	Revol	Chris D'Adda	The Holy Bible
1994	She Is Suffering	Adolfo Doring	The Holy Bible
1994	Faster (US version)	Tony van den Ende	The Holy Bible
1996	A Design for Life	Pedro Romhanyi	Everything Must Go
1996	Everything Must Go	W.I.Z.	Everything Must Go
1996	Kevin Carter	John Hillcoat	Everything Must Go
1996	Australia	John Hillcoat	Everything Must Go
1998	If You Tolerate This Your Children Will Be Next	W.I.Z	This Is My Truth Tell Me Yours
1998	The Everlasting	Mike Lipscombe	This Is My Truth Tell Me Yours
1999	You Stole the Sun from My Heart	Sophie Muller	This Is My Truth Tell Me Yours
1999	Tsunami	Pedro Romhanyi	This Is My Truth Tell Me Yours
2000	The Masses Against the Classes	Chris D'Adda	Non-album single
2001	So Why So Sad	Jamie Thraves	Know Your Enemy
2001	Found That Soul	Jeremy Deller & Nick Abrahams	Know Your Enemy
2001	Ocean Spray	James Frost & Alex Smith	Know Your Enemy
2001	Let Robeson Sing	Andrew Dosunmu	Know Your Enemy
2002	There by the Grace of God	John Hillcoat	Forever Delayed
2004	The Love of Richard Nixon	Type2error	Lifeblood
2004	Quarantine (In My Place of)	Patrick Jones	B-side of "The Love of Richard Nixon"
2004	Yes	Patrick Jones	The Holy Bible (10th Anniversary Edition)
2004	Judge Yr'self	Patrick Jones	The Holy Bible (10th Anniversary Edition)
2005	Empty Souls	Alex Smith	Lifeblood
2005	Dying Breeds	Patrick Jones	B-side of "Empty Souls"
2005	1985	Patrick Jones	Lifeblood
2005	A Song for Departure	Patrick Jones	Lifeblood
2005	Cardiff Afterlife	Patrick Jones	Lifeblood
2005	Emily	Patrick Jones	Lifeblood
2005	Fragments	Patrick Jones	Lifeblood
2005	Solitude Sometimes Is	Patrick Jones	Lifeblood
2005	Firefight	Patrick Jones	God Save the Manics E.P.
2006	Further Away	Patrick Jones	Everything Must Go (10th Anniversary Edition)
2007	Your Love Alone Is Not Enough	John Hardwick	Send Away the Tigers
2007	Autumnsong (TV version)	Indica/PTE	Send Away the Tigers
2007	Autumnsong (Alternative version)	Valerie Philips	Send Away the Tigers
2007	Indian Summer	Patrick Jones	Send Away the Tigers
2007	Send Away the Tigers	Patrick Jones	Send Away the Tigers
2008	Umbrella	Dave Eringa	NME Awards 2008 (Various Artists)
2009	Jackie Collins Existential Question Time	Douglas Hart	Journal for Plague Lovers
2010	(It's Not War) Just the End of Love	Alex Smith	Postcards from a Young Man
2010	Some Kind of Nothingness (TV version)	Doulas Hart	Postcards from a Young Man
2010	Some Kind of Nothingness (Alternative version)	Nicky Wire & Patrick Jones	Postcards from a Young Man
2011	Postcards from a Young Man	James Russell	Postcards from a Young Man
2011	This Is the Day	Jamie Roberts	National Treasures – The Complete Singles
2012	Repeat	Nicky Wire & Patrick Jones	Generation Terrorists (20th Anniversary Edition)
2012	Nat West-Barclays-Midlands-Lloyds	Nicky Wire & Patrick Jones	Generation Terrorists (20th Anniversary Edition)
2013	Rewind the Film	Kieran Evans	Rewind the Film
2013	Show Me the Wonder	Kieran Evans	Rewind the Film
2013	Anthem for a Lost Cause	Kieran Evans	Rewind the Film
2013	Manorbier	Kieran Evans	Rewind the Film
2014	Walk Me to the Bridge	Kieran Evans	Futurology
2014	Futurology	Kieran Evans	Futurology
2016	Together Stronger (C'mon Wales)	Kieran Evans	Non-album single
2017	International Blue	Kieran Evans	Resistance Is Futile
2018	Distant Colours	Kieran Evans	Resistance Is Futile
2018	Dylan & Caitlin	Evan Jones	Resistance Is Futile
2018	Liverpool Revisited	Kieran Evans	Resistance Is Futile
2018	Hold Me Like A Heaven	Kieran Evans	Resistance Is Futile
2018	People Give In	Kieran Evans	Resistance Is Futile
2021	Orwellian	Kieran Evans	The Ultra Vivid Lament
2021	The Secret He Had Missed	Kieran Evans	The Ultra Vivid Lament
2022	Rosebud	Kieran Evans	Know Your Enemy (2022 Reissue)
2024	Hiding in Plain Sight	Kieran Evans	Critical Thinking
2025	Brushstrokes of Reunion	Kieran Evans	Critical Thinking

== Official books ==
Year	Title	Format
2002	Forever Delayed	Official photo book by Mitch Ikeda, with an introduction by Jon Savage.
2025	168 Songs of Hatred and Failure	Biography, written by Keith Cameron.

== Other appearances ==
Year	Title	Album
1994	"P.C.P." (Live)	Volume Eleven; Various artists
1995	"Raindrops Keep Falling On My Head" (orig. by B. J. Thomas)	The Help Album; Various artists; charity album
1996	"You Love Us" (Live)	Radio One Sound City Leeds 1996; Various artists; compilation of BBC Radio 1 sessions
1996	"Small Black Flowers That Grow in the Sky" (Live)	Later Volume One: Brit Beat; Various artists
1996	"Pennyroyal Tea" (orig. by Nirvana)	Evening Session: Priority Tunes; Various artists; compilation of BBC Radio 1 sessions
1998	"This Is Yesterday" (Live Cardiff International Arena 20.12.1998)	NME Annual Probe; Various artists; NME freebie
2002	"Out of Time" (orig. by The Rolling Stones)	NME In Association With War Child Presents 1 Love; Various artists; charity album
2005	"Leviathan"	Help!: A Day In the Life; Various artists; charity album
2006	"The Instrumental" (orig. by The June Brides)	Still Unravished: A Tribute to the June Brides; Various artists
2007	"Motorcycle Emptiness" (Live)	The Saturday Sessions: The Dermot O'Leary Show; Various artists
2008	"Umbrella" (orig. by Rihanna)	NME Awards 2008; Various artists; free CD with NME magazine Also available as an individual download with an Acoustic version and the Grand Slam mix.
2009	"Jackie Collins Existential Question Time" (Live)	Later... with Jools Holland Live 2 Various artists
2009	"Vision Blurred" (orig. by The Horrors)	NME Download; NME blog
2011	"The Masses Against the Classes" (Live)	Dermot O'Leary Presents The Saturday Sessions 2011; Various artists
2012	"Wake Up Alone" (orig. by Amy Winehouse)	Back to Back to Black; Various artists; free CD with Q magazine, August 2012
2012	"If You Tolerate This Your Children Will Be Next" (Live)	This Is BBC Radio 6 Music Live; Various artists
2013	"Your Love Alone Is Not Enough" (Live)	Dermot O'Leary Presents The Saturday Sessions 2013; Various artists
2014	"Let Robeson Sing" (Live)	The Saturday Sessions From The Dermot O'Leary Show; Various artists
2014	"Start Me Up" (orig. by The Rolling Stones)	BBC Radio 2's Sounds of the 80s Various artists
2016	"(Feels Like) Heaven" (orig. by Fiction Factory)	BBC Radio 2's Sounds of the 80s, Vol. 2 Various artists
2020	"Spectators of Suicide" (feat. Gwenno) "Spectators of Suicide" (Welsh Version)	Spectators of Suicide; Various artists Charity release via Bandcamp.
