= National Treasures – The Complete Singles =

Compilation album by Manic Street Preachers
- Released: 31 October 2011
- Recorded: 1990–2011
- Genres: Alternative rock; hard rock; punk rock
- Length: 152:47
- Labels: Columbia; Sony
- Producer: Various

Manic Street Preachers chronology
Postcards from a Young Man (2010)	National Treasures – The Complete Singles (2011)	Rewind the Film (2013)

Singles from National Treasures – The Complete Singles
- 1. "This Is the Day" Released: 18 September 2011

National Treasures – The Complete Singles is a compilation album by the Welsh alternative rock band Manic Street Preachers, released on 31 October 2011 by Columbia Records/Sony Music. It is the band's third compilation album, after the greatest hits collection Forever Delayed (2002), and the B-sides/rarities collection Lipstick Traces (A Secret History of Manic Street Preachers) (2003). The compilation features one new recording, a cover of The The's "This Is the Day", which was issued as a single on 18 September 2011. The compilation reached number 10 on the UK Album Chart in November 2011.

== Background ==
National Treasures includes most of the band's singles from 1991's "Motown Junk", their first charting single, to 2011's "This Is the Day", which was recorded especially for this collection. Despite the "complete singles" title, National Treasures does not contain every Manic Street Preachers single. Missing are the band's debut single "Suicide Alley" (1988) and any tracks from the New Art Riot EP (1990), neither of which charted. The 1992 version of "You Love Us" is included, but the original 1991 single version is not. For the band's two double-A sided singles, "Love's Sweet Exile/Repeat" (1992) and "Faster/P.C.P." (1994), only one song from each is included, "Love's Sweet Exile" and "Faster". Although it made the UK singles chart, the band's 2008 cover of "Umbrella" by Rihanna is not included as it was download-only, and not considered an official single by the band themselves. The band's ninth studio album, Journal for Plague Lovers (2009), is not represented as no singles were officially released from the album.

The collection also excludes singles that were not chart-eligible (1990's "UK Channel Boredom", 2007's "Underdogs" and "The Ghosts of Christmas", and any tracks from 1991's Feminine Is Beautiful EP or 2005's God Save the Manics EP). Non-UK singles, such as the Japanese-only "Further Away" (1996) and "Nobody Loved You" (1998), are also not included.

For a feature article in the 4 October 2011 issue of the NME, to promote National Treasures, Manic Street Preachers - James Dean Bradfield, Nicky Wire, and Sean Moore - were asked to rank a list of 40 of their singles: the 38 tracks from National Treasures plus "Suicide Alley" and "Strip It Down" (from the New Art Riot EP).

== Release ==
National Treasures was released in three formats: a standard 2CD edition, a deluxe 2CD/1DVD edition, and a Super Deluxe edition. The DVD of the deluxe 2CD/1DVD edition features the music videos to the tracks featured on the album as well as the video for the original 1991 single version of "You Love Us", an alternate video for "Autumnsong", and the video for "Jackie Collins Existential Question Time" from Journal for Plague Lovers. The Super Deluxe edition contains the 38 CD singles with their original B-sides in mini-vinyl replica sleeves, as well as 7" vinyls of "Suicide Alley", the New Art Riot EP, and "Jackie Collins Existential Question Time", plus the DVD. A 14 track National Treasures – Selected Singles sampler was also released as a vinyl with Q Magazine containing an exclusive track, a cover of John Cale's "The Endless Plain of Fortune".

The album is certified Gold in the UK, it also charted in Ireland, Spain and in Japan. The album was promoted with a show at the O_{2} Arena.

== Reception ==
Professional ratings
Aggregate scores
Source	Rating
Metacritic	95/100
Review scores
Source	Rating
AllMusic	4.5/5 stars
Uncut	5/5 stars
Q	5/5 stars
Digital Spy	5/5 stars
musicOMH	4.5/5 stars
The Guardian	4/5 stars
BBC Music	favourable
Sputnikmusic	favourable
Drowned in Sound	7/10

The album received a highly favourable response from critics and it was seen as a unique opportunity to hear all the band's singles and see their history. On Metacritic, the album has a score of 95 out of 100, based on 8 critics, which indicates "universal acclaim".

AllMusic awarded the album with a rating of 4.5 out of 5, saying that: "Arriving roughly ten years after their first hits compilation, 2002's Forever Delayed, 2011's National Treasures: The Complete Singles has another decade to cover so it's perfectly sensible that the collection spans two discs as it diligently marches through almost every single Manic Street Preachers released during their first 20 years." (...) "but it's the first disc, containing the songs they recorded with Richey Edwards and the music they made immediately after his disappearance, that makes the strongest case for their legacy." Q and Uncut gave the album a rating of 5 out of 5. Digital Spy also gave the album a perfect score and said that: "Against all odds, Manic Street Preachers are British pop's ultimate survivors. Proof that in the long run it's far better to be ridiculed by some than meekly accepted by all. They've been laughed at, battered, bruised, indulged, celebrated, diminished, reborn, accepted, mocked, hated and loved all over again. Iconoclasts become pop superstars. Misfits turned national treasures."

=== Recognition ===
The album was voted by NME magazine as the best re-issue of 2011, beating Nirvana's deluxe and super deluxe edition of Nevermind to the top spot.

== Live ==
On 17 December 2011, the group performed 'A Night of National Treasures' at O_{2} Arena in London to celebrate the bands 25 years to date, and enter into a period of hiatus where the eleventh album was written. The band performed all the 38 singles in one show, with around 20.000 people attending the show. It featured guests, like Nina Persson from the Cardigans who sings with the band on the single Your Love Alone Is Not Enough and Gruff Rhys from Super Furry Animals who sang with the band that night on the track Let Robeson Sing. The Guardian reviewed the show, giving it a score of five out of five, and stated that: "the Manics can sell out an arena gig at which they perform all 38 of their singles (as compiled on the recent album National Treasures) proves they were right about one thing all along: they really are a stadium band."

== Track listing ==
Disc one
No.	Title	Length
1.	"Motown Junk" (non-album single, 1991)	3:58
2.	"Stay Beautiful" (from Generation Terrorists, 1992)	3:10
3.	"Love's Sweet Exile" (from Generation Terrorists, 1992)	3:05
4.	"You Love Us" (from Generation Terrorists, 1992)	4:17
5.	"Slash 'n' Burn" (from Generation Terrorists, 1992)	3:58
6.	"Motorcycle Emptiness" (from Generation Terrorists, 1992)	6:06
7.	"Theme from M.A.S.H. (Suicide Is Painless)" (non-album single, 1992)	3:42
8.	"Little Baby Nothing" (from Generation Terrorists, 1992)	4:40
9.	"From Despair to Where" (from Gold Against the Soul, 1993)	3:37
10.	"La Tristesse Durera (Scream to a Sigh)" (from Gold Against the Soul, 1993)	4:14
11.	"Roses in the Hospital" (from Gold Against the Soul, 1993)	5:02
12.	"Life Becoming a Landslide" (from Gold Against the Soul, 1993)	4:14
13.	"Faster" (from The Holy Bible, 1994)	3:55
14.	"Revol" (from The Holy Bible, 1994)	3:04
15.	"She Is Suffering" (from The Holy Bible, 1994)	4:44
16.	"A Design for Life" (from Everything Must Go, 1996)	4:20
17.	"Everything Must Go" (from Everything Must Go, 1996)	3:41
18.	"Kevin Carter" (from Everything Must Go, 1996)	3:25
19.	"Australia" (from Everything Must Go, 1996)	4:04

Disc two
No.	Title	Length
1.	"If You Tolerate This Your Children Will Be Next" (from This Is My Truth Tell Me Yours, 1998)	4:51
2.	"The Everlasting" (from This Is My Truth Tell Me Yours, 1998)	6:07
3.	"You Stole the Sun from My Heart" (from This Is My Truth Tell Me Yours, 1998)	4:22
4.	"Tsunami" (from This Is My Truth Tell Me Yours, 1998)	3:49
5.	"The Masses Against the Classes" (non-album single, 2000)	3:23
6.	"So Why So Sad" (from Know Your Enemy, 2001)	4:02
7.	"Found That Soul" (from Know Your Enemy, 2001)	3:07
8.	"Ocean Spray" (from Know Your Enemy, 2001)	4:13
9.	"Let Robeson Sing" (from Know Your Enemy, 2001)	3:46
10.	"There by the Grace of God" (from Forever Delayed, 2002)	3:48
11.	"The Love of Richard Nixon" (from Lifeblood, 2004)	3:39
12.	"Empty Souls" (from Lifeblood, 2004)	4:05
13.	"Your Love Alone Is Not Enough" (from Send Away the Tigers, 2007)	3:55
14.	"Autumnsong" (from Send Away the Tigers, 2007)	3:41
15.	"Indian Summer" (from Send Away the Tigers, 2007)	3:55
16.	"(It's Not War) Just the End of Love" (from Postcards from a Young Man, 2010)	3:28
17.	"Some Kind of Nothingness" (from Postcards from a Young Man, 2010)	3:48
18.	"Postcards from a Young Man" (from Postcards from a Young Man, 2010)	3:35
19.	"This Is the Day" (new cover song, 2011)	3:38

Japanese bonus track
No.	Title	Length
20.	"Rock 'n' Roll Genius" (new song, 2011)	2:40

== Charts and certifications ==
=== Weekly charts ===
Weekly chart performance for National Treasures – The Complete Singles
Chart (2011)	Peak position
Irish Albums (IRMA)	30
Scottish Albums (Official Charts)	7
Spanish Albums (Promusicae)	70
UK Albums (Official Charts)	10

=== Year-end charts ===
Year-end chart performance for National Treasures – The Complete Singles
Chart (2011)	Position
UK Albums (OCC)	163

=== Certifications ===
Certifications for National Treasures – The Complete Singles
Region	Certification	Certified units/sales
United Kingdom (BPI)	Gold	100,000^{‡}
^{‡} Sales+streaming figures based on certification alone.
