= Lipstick Traces (A Secret History of Manic Street Preachers) =

Compilation album by Manic Street Preachers
- Released: 14 July 2003
- Recorded: 1989–2002
- Genre: Alternative rock; hard rock; punk rock
- Length: 118:18
- Label: Sony
- Producer: Various

Manic Street Preachers chronology
Forever Delayed (2002)	Lipstick Traces (A Secret History of Manic Street Preachers) (2003)	Lifeblood (2004)

Lipstick Traces (A Secret History of Manic Street Preachers) is a compilation album by Welsh alternative rock band Manic Street Preachers, released on 14 July 2003 by Sony Music Entertainment. It consists of various B-sides, rarities and cover versions and reached number 11 on the UK Album Chart.

== Content ==
=== Title ===
It is named after the Greil Marcus book Lipstick Traces: A Secret History of the 20th Century and shares its title with a bootleg album of Manics rarities (more simply titled Lipstick Traces).

=== Album cover ===
The sleeve was designed principally by Nicky Wire and contrasted greatly from the simple, graphically precise covers designed by Farrow Design who have done the majority of design work for the band since 1996. Initial copies came in a gatefold sleeve with a basic inlay; further inserts could be downloaded and printed off from the band's official website.

== Promotion ==
As part of the promotion for the album, the band did a signing tour around the UK. At the final signing session in London they also played a short set of tracks from the album. A video for "Judge Yr'self" featuring early self-recorded clips of the band playing live also played on UK music television channels.

== Release ==
Lipstick Traces was released on 14 July 2003. It reached number 11 in the UK Albums Chart and spent a total of three weeks in the Top 100. The compilation also charted within the top 40 in Finland and Ireland.

== Reception ==
Professional ratings
Review scores
Source	Rating
AllMusic	3/5 stars
entertainment.ie	4/5 stars
Hot Press	favourable
Pitchfork	6.3/10
Sputnikmusic	3/5 stars
Uncut	3/5 stars
Yahoo! Music UK	5/10 stars

The compilation album received favourable reviews from critics. Sputnikmusic stated that: "But still, if you are willing to go and wade through a B-Side history of the Manic's- which I doubt many do- there's a genuine albums worth of classics to be found, with the second disc a redundant retread of covers that could have been used to make the collection more expansive and valuable. It's a shame the band couldn't be more convenient in delivering their secret history to you."

AllMusic rated the album with a 3 out of 5, saying that: "Some of the Manics' peers did deliver consistently on their B-sides -- Suede and Oasis have B-sides collections every bit as good as their proper albums -- but they themselves didn't. And that's fine -- this collection was put out for the sake of completeness, and for completists, it's a good buy. But less dedicated fans can pass it by." Pitchfork also reviewed the album with a 6.3/10, and said that: "Manic Street Preachers never conquered the world like they wanted to, but it's been a good enough ride that I don't begrudge them for trying, and this compilation, flawed though it is, is sure to please those who'd always hoped they would succeed."

=== From fans ===
The album received a far more positive reception from fans than the Forever Delayed greatest hits album, which was heavily criticised for favouring the band's more commercially successful singles. The only recurring criticism of Lipstick Traces was the exclusion of the infamous fan favourite "Patrick Bateman" from the "La Tristesse Durera (Scream to a Sigh)" single. The band explained that it was excluded mainly because it was almost seven minutes long and simply would not fit on the album. Bradfield has also been very critical of the song in the past, saying that it had great lyrics but the music was "dreadful". Fans also missed "Too Cold Here" from the "Revol" single. The song was very successful in fans' voting on the official site.

== Track listing ==
Disc one: B-sides and rarities
No.	Title	Length
1.	"Prologue to History" (from "If You Tolerate This Your Children Will Be Next")	4:47
2.	"4 Ever Delayed" (previously unreleased)	3:38
3.	"Sorrow 16" (from "Motown Junk")	3:46
4.	"Judge Yr'self" (previously unreleased)	3:03
5.	"Socialist Serenade" (from "You Stole the Sun from My Heart")	4:15
6.	"Donkeys" (from "Roses in the Hospital")	3:13
7.	"Comfort Comes" (from "Life Becoming a Landslide")	3:29
8.	"Mr Carbohydrate" (from "A Design for Life")	4:16
9.	"Dead Trees and Traffic Islands" (from "A Design for Life")	3:45
10.	"Horses Under Starlight" (from "Kevin Carter")	3:10
11.	"Sepia" (from "Kevin Carter")	3:56
12.	"Sculpture of Man" (from "Faster/P.C.P.")	1:55
13.	"Spectators of Suicide" (Heavenly Records version; from "You Love Us" [Heavenly version])	5:06
14.	"Democracy Coma" (from "Love's Sweet Exile/Repeat")	3:45
15.	"Strip It Down" (live; from "You Love Us" [Heavenly])	2:42
16.	"Bored Out of My Mind" (from "Motorcycle Emptiness")	2:57
17.	"Just a Kid" (from "Ocean Spray")	3:36
18.	"Close My Eyes" (from "The Masses Against the Classes")	4:29
19.	"Valley Boy" (from "The Everlasting")	5:10
20.	"We Her Majesty's Prisoners" (from "Motown Junk")	5:22

Disc two: cover versions
No.	Title	Length
1.	"We Are All Bourgeois Now" (originally by McCarthy; from Know Your Enemy)	4:35
2.	"Rock 'n' Roll Music" (originally by Chuck Berry; from "The Masses Against the Classes")	2:55
3.	"It's So Easy" (live; originally by Guns N' Roses; from "You Love Us")	2:54
4.	"Take the Skinheads Bowling" (originally by Camper Van Beethoven; from "Australia")	2:30
5.	"Been a Son" (originally by Nirvana)	2:28
6.	"Out of Time" (originally by the Rolling Stones; from NME in Association with War Child Presents 1 Love)	3:34
7.	"Raindrops Keep Fallin' on My Head" (originally by B. J. Thomas; from The Help Album)	2:58
8.	"Bright Eyes" (live; originally by Art Garfunkel; from "A Design for Life")	3:14
9.	"Train in Vain" (live; originally by the Clash; from "You Stole the Sun from My Heart")	3:16
10.	"Wrote for Luck" (originally by Happy Mondays; from "Roses in the Hospital")	2:43
11.	"What's My Name" (live; originally by the Clash; from "La Tristesse Durera (Scream to a Sigh)")	1:45
12.	"Velocity Girl" (originally by Primal Scream; from "Australia")	1:41
13.	"Can't Take My Eyes Off You" (originally by Frankie Valli; from "Australia")	3:13
14.	"Didn't My Lord Deliver Daniel" (traditional; famously recorded by Paul Robeson; from "Let Robeson Sing")	2:07
15.	"Last Christmas" (live 20/12/96 TFI Friday Performance; originally by Wham!)	2:05

Japanese bonus tracks
No.	Title	Length
16.	"A Secret Society" (from God Save the Manics)	2:53
17.	"Firefight" (from God Save the Manics)	3:43
18.	"Picturesque" (from God Save the Manics)	3:53
19.	"Everything Must Go"	3:09

== Missing tracks ==
- "Suicide Alley" (from "Suicide Alley" and "Little Baby Nothing")
- "UK Channel Boredom" (from "UK Channel Boredom")
- "Tennessee (I Get Low)" (from "Suicide Alley" and "La Tristesse Durera (Scream to a Sigh)")
- "New Art Riot" (from New Art Riot)
- "Last Exit on Yesterday" (from New Art Riot)
- "Teenage 20/20" (from New Art Riot)
- "You Love Us (Heavenly Recording)" (from "You Love Us (Heavenly Version)")
- "Starlover" (from "You Love Us (Heavenly Version)" and "From Despair to Where")
- "R.P. McMurphy" (from "Stay Beautiful")
- "Soul Contamination" (from "Stay Beautiful")
- "A Vision of Dead Desire" (from "You Love Us")
- "Ain't Going Down" (from "Slash 'n' Burn")
- "Under My Wheels" (originally by Alice Cooper) (from "Motorcycle Emptiness")
- "Sleeping with the NME" (from "Theme from M.A.S.H. (Suicide Is Painless)")
- "Never Want Again" (from "Little Baby Nothing")
- "Dead Yankee Drawl" (from "Little Baby Nothing")
- "Hibernation" (from "From Despair to Where")
- "Patrick Bateman" (from "La Tristesse Durera (Scream to a Sigh)")
- "Roses in the Hospital" (Single Version) (from "Roses in the Hospital")
- "Us Against You" (from "Roses in the Hospital")
- "Slash N' Burn (live at Club Citta, Kawasaki, Japan)" (from Gold Against the Soul (Japanese version))
- "Crucifix Kiss (live at Club Citta, Kawasaki, Japan)" (from Gold Against the Soul (Japanese version))
- "Motown Junk (live at Club Citta, Kawasaki, Japan)" (from Gold Against the Soul (Japanese version))
- "Tennessee (live at Club Citta, Kawasaki, Japan)" (from Gold Against the Soul (Japanese version))
- "You Love Us (live at Club Citta, Kawasaki, Japan)" (from Gold Against the Soul (Japanese version))
- "Are Mothers Saints" (from Life Becoming a Landslide EP)
- "Charles Windsor" (originally by McCarthy) (from Life Becoming a Landslide EP)
- "The Drowners" (originally by Suede) (from "She Is Suffering")
- "Stay with Me" (originally by Faces) (from "She Is Suffering")
- "Too Cold Here" (from "Revol")
- "Love Torn Us Under" (from "She Is Suffering")
- "Dead Passive" (from "A Design for Life")
- "Black Garden" (from "Everything Must Go")
- "Hanging On" (from "Everything Must Go")
- "No One Knows What It's Like to Be Me" (from "Everything Must Go")
- "First Republic" (from "Kevin Carter")
- "Montana/Autumn/78" (from "If You Tolerate This Your Children Will Be Next")
- "Black Holes for the Young" (featuring Sophie Ellis-Bextor) (from "The Everlasting")
- "Buildings for Dead People" (from "Tsunami")
- "Locust Valley" (from "Found That Soul")
- "Ballad of the Bangkok Novotel" (from "Found That Soul")
- "Pedestal" (from "So Why So Sad")
- "Groundhog Days" (from "Ocean Spray")
- "Little Trolls" (from "Ocean Spray")
- "Masking Tape" (from "Let Robeson Sing")
- "Fear of Motion" (from "Let Robeson Sing")
- "Automatik Teknicolour" (from "There by the Grace of God")
- "It's All Gone" (from "There by the Grace of God")
- "Unstoppable Salvation" (from "There by the Grace of God")
- "Happy Ending" (from "There by the Grace of God")

== Charts ==
Chart performance for Lipstick Traces
Chart (2003)	Peak position
Finnish Albums (Suomen virallinen lista)	28
Irish Albums (IRMA)	21
Scottish Albums (Official Charts)	6
UK Albums (Official Charts)	11
