= Forever Delayed =

Manic Street Preachers album

Greatest hits album by Manic Street Preachers
- Released: 28 October 2002
- Recorded: 1991–2002
- Genre: Alternative rock; hard rock; punk rock
- Length: 155:56
- Label: Epic
- Producer: Various (see track listing)

Manic Street Preachers chronology
Know Your Enemy (2001)	Forever Delayed (2002)	Lipstick Traces (2003)

Singles from Forever Delayed
- 1. "There by the Grace of God" Released: 14 October 2002

Forever Delayed

Video by Manic Street Preachers
- Released: 18 November 2002
- Recorded: 1991–2002
- Genre: Alternative rock, hard rock, punk rock
- Label: Epic

Manic Street Preachers video album chronology
Louder Than War (2001)	Forever Delayed (2002)

Forever Delayed is a greatest hits album and DVD by Welsh alternative rock band Manic Street Preachers, released on 28 October 2002 by Epic Records. The album included three non-album singles ("Motown Junk", "Suicide Is Painless" and the number one hit "The Masses Against the Classes"), as well as two new songs, the single "There by the Grace of God" and "Door to the River". The album was available as a one-CD standard edition as well as a two-CD special edition with the second CD composed of remixes.

The album peaked and debuted on the UK Albums Chart at number four.

== Content ==
The album featured two new songs: the single "There by the Grace of God" and "Door to the River". "Door to the River" was originally recorded in the sessions for the Know Your Enemy album, but the band deemed the song too unfitting to the album's general style. "There by the Grace of God" could be seen as a foreshadowing of what followed the hits compilation, as it features a more electronic/keyboard-heavy style that would eventually be the main style of the band's next studio album, Lifeblood.

Several songs were edited for length ("Motorcycle Emptiness", "La Tristesse Durera (Scream to a Sigh)", "You Love Us", "Australia", "From Despair to Where", "Everything Must Go", "Little Baby Nothing" and "The Everlasting") so that more tracks could fit onto one CD (though not listed as edits in the liner notes).

The title of Forever Delayed is lifted from the lyrics of their song "Roses in the Hospital" (which does not feature on the album). A song called "4 Ever Delayed" was recorded for inclusion but ended up not being included. Plans of releasing it as part of a new 2-CD edition of the compilation and as CD single were then toyed with but never surfaced. It eventually wound up on the band's following B-sides and rarities compilation Lipstick Traces (A Secret History of Manic Street Preachers) in 2003. The title of the greatest hits package had also been planned for several years previous; band member Nicky Wire first mentioned it in Simon Price's biography Everything – A Book About Manic Street Preachers, published in 1998.

== Release ==
The compilation album reached number 4 in the UK Albums Chart, and spent a total of 19 weeks in the Top 100. To date it has gone Double Platinum (600,000 copies) in the UK. It reached number 7 in Ireland and in Finland, and it also charted within the Top 20 in Denmark. The album has sold more than one million copies since its release in 2002.

The album was promoted by the single "There by the Grace of God", which debuted and peaked at number six in the UK singles chart.

The Forever Delayed DVD was released in 2002 together with the greatest hits CD, and features all the band's promo videos to that point. Along with the promo videos there is a selection of 14 remix videos, where the visual material is taken from clips of the promo videos as well as backdrop visuals from the band's live concerts.

An official Manic Street Preachers book, also titled Forever Delayed, was released at the same time as the album and DVD. The book comprised photos taken by Mitch Ikeda spanning the band's history to that point.

== Reception ==
Professional ratings
Review scores
Source	Rating
AllMusic	4/5 stars
BBC Music	unfavourable
Blender	4/5 stars
Entertainment.ie	3/5 stars
NME	unfavourable
Rolling Stone	4/5 stars
Sputnikmusic	3.5/5
Stylus	B−
Uncut	5/5 stars
Yahoo! Music UK	8/10 stars

Forever Delayed is the first compilation album by the Manic Street Preachers, and it was not well received by NME that stated: "So here it is, The Album That Should Not Exist. To the slogan-smothered, soul-bruised, scarred-for-the-cause skunkpunk heroes of 1991 - the scary/beautiful freaks claiming they'll self-destruct after one six million-selling album - this greatest hits would be musical treachery."

AllMusic rated the album with a 4 out of 5, saying: "Manic Street Preachers have always been a band of very specific charms, something that has not translated outside of the U.K. particularly well. Although it boasts a generous 20 tracks, the 2002 compilation Forever Delayed isn't likely to change that situation, even if it has the lion's share of their big singles, since a band devoted to sloganeering doesn't play outside of their province, or era, without some knowledge of their context."

Sputnikmusic made a track-by-track review, finishing with: "Overall I'd say this is a great introduction to the Manics, but it's nowhere near definitive. It's missing too many good songs (Slash N Burn especially), and it's far too biased towards This Is My Truth Tell Me Yours."

== Track listing ==
=== Album ===
==== Standard edition and CD 1 of special edition ====
#	Song title	Length	From album	Single released	Producer
1	"A Design for Life"	4:20	Everything Must Go	15 April 1996 (No. 2)	Mike Hedges
2	"Motorcycle Emptiness" (Edit)	5:06	Generation Terrorists	1 June 1992 (No. 17)	Steve Brown
3	"If You Tolerate This Your Children Will Be Next"	4:51	This Is My Truth Tell Me Yours	24 August 1998 (No. 1)	Dave Eringa
4	"La Tristesse Durera (Scream to a Sigh)" (Edit)	4:06	Gold Against the Soul	26 July 1993 (No. 22)	Eringa
5	"There by the Grace of God"	3:47	New track	14 October 2002 (No. 6)	Hedges
6	"You Love Us" (Edit)	3:14	Generation Terrorists	16 January 1992 (No. 16)	Brown
7	"Australia" (Edit)	3:42	Everything Must Go	2 December 1996 (No. 7)	Hedges
8	"You Stole the Sun from My Heart"	4:21	This Is My Truth Tell Me Yours	8 March 1999 (No. 5)	Hedges
9	"Kevin Carter"	3:24	Everything Must Go	30 September 1996 (No. 9)	Hedges
10	"Tsunami"	3:49	This Is My Truth Tell Me Yours	5 July 1999 (No. 11)	Hedges
11	"The Masses Against the Classes"	3:23	Non-album single	10 January 2000 (No. 1)	Eringa
12	"From Despair to Where" (Edit)	3:21	Gold Against the Soul	7 June 1993 (No. 25)	Eringa
13	"Door to the River"	4:41	New track	Not a single	Hedges
14	"Everything Must Go" (Edit)	3:07	Everything Must Go	22 July 1996 (No. 5)	Hedges
15	"Faster"	3:53	The Holy Bible	6 June 1994 (No. 16)	Manic Street Preachers, Brown
16	"Little Baby Nothing" (feat. Traci Lords) (7" version)	4:12	Generation Terrorists	16 November 1992 (No. 29)	Brown
17	"Suicide Is Painless (Theme from MASH)" (edit)	3:28	Non-album single	7 September 1992 (No. 7)	Manic Street Preachers, Brown
18	"So Why So Sad"	3:45	Know Your Enemy	26 February 2001 (No. 8)	Eringa
19	"The Everlasting" (Edit)	4:07	This Is My Truth Tell Me Yours	30 November 1998 (No. 11)	Hedges
20	"Motown Junk"	3:59	Non-album single	21 January 1991 (No. 94)	Robin Wynn Evans

==== CD 2 of special edition ====
The Remixes
No.	Title	Length
1.	"La Tristesse Durera (Scream to a Sigh)" (The Chemical Brothers Remix)	6:32
2.	"If You Tolerate This Your Children Will Be Next" (David Holmes Remix)	9:59
3.	"Tsunami" (Cornelius Remix)	4:07
4.	"So Why So Sad" (The Avalanches Remix)	4:59
5.	"Faster" (The Chemical Brothers Remix)	5:46
6.	"If You Tolerate This Your Children Will Be Next" (Massive Attack Remix)	4:55
7.	"Kevin Carter" (Jon Carter Remix)	7:43
8.	"You Stole the Sun from My Heart" (David Holmes Remix)	5:11
9.	"Tsunami" (Stereolab Remix)	6:45
10.	"Let Robeson Sing" (Ian Brown Remix)	5:01
11.	"The Everlasting" (Stealth Sonic Orchestra Vocal Remix)	5:14
12.	"You Stole the Sun from My Heart" (Mogwai Remix)	6:14
13.	"A Design for Life" (Stealth Sonic Orchestra Remix)	4:50

=== DVD ===
==== Videos ====
#	Song title	From album	Director
1	"Motown Junk"	Non-album single	Snub TV
2	"You Love Us" (Heavenly Recordings Version)	Non-album single	Tony Van Den Ende
3	"You Love Us" (Sony Music Version)	Generation Terrorists	W.I.Z.
4	"Stay Beautiful"	Generation Terrorists	Walter Stern
5	"Love's Sweet Exile"	Generation Terrorists	W.I.Z.
6	"Slash 'n' Burn"	Generation Terrorists	Van Den Ende
7	"Motorcycle Emptiness"	Generation Terrorists	Martin Hall
8	"Little Baby Nothing"	Generation Terrorists	Small and B Swells
9	"Theme from MASH (Suicide Is Painless)"	Non-album single	Matthew Amos
10	"From Despair to Where"	Gold Against the Soul	Peter Scammell
11	"La Tristesse Durera (Scream to a Sigh)"	Gold Against the Soul	Josh Taft
12	"Roses in the Hospital"	Gold Against the Soul	Erik Zimmerman
13	"Life Becoming a Landslide"	Gold Against the Soul	Martin Hall
14	"Faster"	The Holy Bible	Chris D'Adda
15	"Revol"	The Holy Bible	D'Adda
16	"She Is Suffering"	The Holy Bible	Adolfo Doring
17	"A Design for Life"	Everything Must Go	Pedro Romhanyi
18	"Everything Must Go"	Everything Must Go	W.I.Z.
19	"Kevin Carter"	Everything Must Go	John Hillcoat
20	"Australia"	Everything Must Go	John Hillcoat
21	"If You Tolerate This Your Children Will Be Next"	This Is My Truth Tell Me Yours	W.I.Z.
22	"The Everlasting"	This Is My Truth Tell Me Yours	Mike Lipscombe
23	"You Stole the Sun from My Heart"	This Is My Truth Tell Me Yours	Sophie Muller
24	"Tsunami"	This Is My Truth Tell Me Yours	Romhanyi
25	"The Masses Against the Classes" (live performance taken from Leaving the 20th Century)	Non-album single	
26	"Found That Soul"	Know Your Enemy	Jeremy Deller and Nick Abrahams
27	"So Why So Sad"	Know Your Enemy	Jamie Thraves
28	"Ocean Spray"	Know Your Enemy	James Frost and Alex Smith
29	"Let Robeson Sing"	Know Your Enemy	Andrew Dosunmu
30	"There by the Grace of God"	Non-album single	Hillcoat

==== Remix videos ====
- "La Tristesse Durera (Scream to a Sigh)" (The Chemical Brothers remix)
- "If You Tolerate This Your Children Will Be Next" (David Holmes remix)
- "Tsunami" (Cornelius remix)
- "So Why So Sad" (Avalanches remix)
- "Faster" (The Chemical Brothers remix)
- "If You Tolerate This Your Children Will Be Next" (Massive Attack remix)
- "Kevin Carter" (Jon Carter remix)
- "You Stole the Sun from My Heart" (David Holmes remix)
- "Tsunami" (Stereolab remix)
- "Let Robeson Sing" (Ian Brown remix)
- "The Everlasting" (Stealth Sonic Orchestra remix)
- "You Stole the Sun from My Heart" (Mogwai remix)
- "A Design for Life" (Stealth Sonic Orchestra remix)
- "Ocean Spray" (Kinobe remix)

=== Credits ===
- Tracks 1, 3, 5, 7, 8, 10, 11, 13, 14, 18 and 19:
  - Lyrics by Nicky Wire
  - Music by James Dean Bradfield and Sean Moore
- Tracks 2, 4, 6, 12, 15, 16 and 20:
  - Lyrics by Nicky Wire and Richey James Edwards
  - Music by James Dean Bradfield and Sean Moore
- Track 9:
  - Lyrics by Richey James Edwards
  - Music by James Dean Bradfield, Nicky Wire and Sean Moore
- Track 17:
  - Written by Mike Altman and Johnny Mandel

== Charts and certifications ==
=== Weekly charts ===
Chart (2002)	Peak position
Australian Albums (ARIA)	83
Danish Albums (Hitlisten)	14
Finnish Albums (Suomen virallinen lista)	7
Belgian Albums (Ultratop Flanders)	36
German Albums (Offizielle Top 100)	65
Irish Albums (IRMA)	7
Norwegian Albums (VG-lista)	32
Dutch Albums (Album Top 100)	67
Japanese Albums (Oricon)	68
Swedish Albums (Sverigetopplistan)	43
UK Albums (OCC)	4

=== Year-end charts ===
Chart (2002)	Position
UK Albums (OCC)	55

=== Certifications ===
Region	Certification	Certified units/sales
United Kingdom (BPI)	2× Platinum	600,000^{^}
^{^} Shipments figures based on certification alone.
