= Caff Records =

British independent record label

- Founded: 1989
- Founder: Bob Stanley
- Defunct: 1992
- Genre: Alternative rock Indiepop; Shoegazing; Britpop
- Country of origin: United Kingdom
- Location: Croydon, England

Caff Records was a short lived British independent record label run by Bob Stanley of the band Saint Etienne. The label grew out of a fanzine Stanley put out with fellow band member Pete Wiggs, with the label going by the name Caff, Caff Records and Caff Corporation. Established in 1989, it is most noted for single releases by Pulp and the Manic Street Preachers. The Caff logo is a line drawing of a duck. After closing the label, Stanley together with Wiggs ran Icerink Records (1992–1994), Royal Mint (1995) and EMIdisc (1996). They currently have a CD imprint called Eclipse via Universal.

== Discography ==
Caff only released one-off singles of each group. Singles, EPs and split singles were solely released on the seven inch (7") format.

| Catalogue number | Date | Artist | Title |
|---|---|---|---|
| CAFF 1 | 1989 | East Village / Cath Coughlan | Freeze Out / Im' long Me Measaim (Split flexi-disc) |
| CAFF 2 | 1989 | The Field Mice | I Can See Myself Alone Forever / Everything About You |
| CAFF 3 | 1989 | Phil Wilson | Better Days / The Written Word |
| CAFF 4 | 1989 | Close Lobsters | Just Too Bloody Stupid |
| CAFF 5 | 1989 | Television Personalities | I Still Believe in Magic / Respectable |
| CAFF 6 | 1989 | Buffalo Tom | Enemy / Deep in the Ground |
| CAFF 7 | 1990 | Another Sunny Day | Genetic Engineering / Kilburn Towers |
| CAFF 8 | 1990 | The Claim | Birth of a Teenager / Mike The Bike |
| CAFF 9 | 1990 | Galaxie 500 | Rain / Don't Let Our Youth Go To Waste |
| CAFF 10 | 1990 | Razorcuts | Sometimes I Worry About You (4 track EP) |
| CAFF 11 | 1990 | The Orchids | An Ill Wind That Blows / All Those Things |
| CAFF 12 | 1990 | The Lilac Time | Madresfield / Bird on a Wire |
| CAFF 13 | 1990 | Biff Bang Pow/ The Times | Sleep / Extase (Split single, usually known as The Mods Are Back!) |
| CAFF 14 | 1991 | Bitch Magnet | Sadie / Ducks And Drakes |
| CAFF 15 | 1991 | Manic Street Preachers | New Art Riot / Repeat After Me (Known as Feminine Is Beautiful) |
| CAFF 16 | 1991 | World of Twist | The Sausage / Skidding into Love / Space Rockit |
| CAFF 17 | 1992 | Pulp | My Legendary Girlfriend (live) / Sickly Grin / Back in LA |

== See also ==
- Shampoo - a pop duo who released a number of records on Icerink
- List of record labels
