= Ruby Trax =

Compilation album by various artists
- Released: 23 November 1992
- Genre: Alternative rock
- Length: 156:04
- Label: New Musical Express
- Producer: Various

Singles from Ruby Trax
- 1. "Theme from MASH" / "(Everything I Do) I Do It for You" Released: 7 September 1992

Professional ratings
Review scores
Source	Rating
AllMusic	4/5 stars

Ruby Trax: The NME's Roaring Forty is a compilation album released by New Musical Express (NME) magazine in 1992 to commemorate 40 years of publication.

== Overview ==
The album features 40 cover versions of classic Number 1 songs by popular bands of the era, though as the NME based it on their own chart, some songs (such as Ultravox's "Vienna" recorded by Vic Reeves) did not reach number one on the British Market Research Bureau/Gallup chart (now branded as the Official Singles Chart). It was released in the following formats: three LPs (NME40LP), three CDs (NME40CD) or two cassettes (NME40MC), all having a total of 40 songs.

The album spawned a double A-side single featuring Manic Street Preachers' version of "Suicide Is Painless", which was listed as "Theme from M.A.S.H.", and the Fatima Mansions' take on Bryan Adams' "(Everything I Do) I Do It for You" . The 12" and CD versions of the single included an interview with Steve Lamacq about an incident in which Richey Edwards had carved '4 Real' into his arm with a razor blade. This was entitled "Sleeping with the NME" and credited to the Manic Street Preachers. The single peaked at No. 7 on the UK Singles Chart.

All proceeds from the album went to the charity The Spastics Society.

== Track listing ==
=== 3-CD version ===
Disc one
No.	Title	Writer(s)	Artist	Length
1.	"Coz I Luv You"	Noddy Holder, Jim Lea	The Wonder Stuff	3:26
2.	"When Will I See You Again?"	Gamble and Huff	Billy Bragg	2:59
3.	"Little Red Rooster"	Willie Dixon	The Jesus and Mary Chain	3:24
4.	"Atomic"	Debbie Harry, Jimmy Destri	The Mission	5:11
5.	"(Everything I Do) I Do It for You"	Bryan Adams, Michael Kamen, Robert John "Mutt" Lange	The Fatima Mansions	6:26
6.	"Stranger in Paradise"	Alexander Borodin, Robert Wright, George Forrest	Saint Etienne	3:25
7.	"Cumberland Gap"	traditional	The Wedding Present	1:30
8.	"(If Paradise Is) Half as Nice"	Lucio Battisti, Jack Fishman	Aztec Camera / Andy Fairweather-Low	5:22
9.	"Show You the Way to Go"	Gamble and Huff	Dannii Minogue	4:40
10.	"Where Do You Go To My Lovely?"	Peter Sarstedt	Welfare Heroine	5:20
11.	"Bad Moon Rising"	John Fogerty	The Blue Aeroplanes	5:21
12.	"Apache"	Jerry Lordan	Senseless Things	2:41
13.	"Mr. Tambourine Man"	Bob Dylan	Teenage Fanclub	2:11

Disc two
No.	Title	Writer(s)	Artist	Length
1.	"Another Brick in the Wall"	Roger Waters	Carter USM	3:49
2.	"Maggie May"	Rod Stewart, Martin Quittenton	Blur	4:08
3.	"Ashes to Ashes"	David Bowie	Tears for Fears	4:32
4.	"Rock Your Baby"	Harry Wayne Casey, Richard Finch	The House of Love	2:31
5.	"I'm a Believer"	Neil Diamond	The Frank and Walters	2:42
6.	"Shaddap You Face"	Joe Dolce	EMF	1:56
7.	"Brass in Pocket"	Chrissie Hynde, James Honeyman-Scott	Suede	3:42
8.	"Ring My Bell"	Frederick Knight	Tori Amos	4:35
9.	"Lady Madonna"	Lennon–McCartney	Kingmaker	2:04
10.	"Like a Prayer"	Madonna, Patrick Leonard	Marc Almond	6:10
11.	"Don't You Want Me?"	Philip Oakey, Jo Callis, Philip Adrian Wright	The Farm	4:09
12.	"I've Never Been to Me"	Ron Miller, Kenneth Hirsch	Ned's Atomic Dustbin	5:28
13.	"My Sweet Lord"	George Harrison	Boy George	3:27

Disc three
No.	Title	Writer(s)	Artist	Length
1.	"Voodoo Chile"	Jimi Hendrix	Jesus Jones	5:15
2.	"Sunny Afternoon"	Ray Davies	Bob Geldof	3:49
3.	"The Good, the Bad and the Ugly"	Ennio Morricone	Johnny Marr & Billy Duffy	4:50
4.	"Down Down"	Francis Rossi, Bob Young	Cud	3:20
5.	"The Legend of Xanadu"	Ken Howard, Alan Blaikley	The Fall	3:28
6.	"Secret Love"	Sammy Fain, Paul Francis Webster	Sinéad O'Connor	2:53
7.	"World Without Love"	Lennon–McCartney	World Party	3:10
8.	"Tainted Love"	Ed Cobb	Inspiral Carpets	4:24
9.	"Baby Come Back"	Eddy Grant	Elektric Music	4:01
10.	"The Model"	Ralf Hütter, Karl Bartos, Emil Schult	Ride	3:49
11.	"Vienna"	Midge Ure, Chris Cross, Warren Cann, Billy Currie	Vic Reeves	3:21
12.	"Go Now"	Larry Banks, Milton Bennett	Tin Machine	4:30
13.	"I Feel Love"	Donna Summer, Giorgio Moroder, Pete Bellotte	Curve	4:25
14.	"Suicide Is Painless"	Johnny Mandel, Mike Altman	Manic Street Preachers	3:40

== See also ==
- Sgt. Pepper Knew My Father – the NME charity album featuring the number one double A-side "With a Little Help from My Friends" by Wet Wet Wet / "She's Leaving Home" by Billy Bragg with Cara Tivey
- List of NME number-one singles of the 1980s – from the NME's rival to charts broadcast by BBC Radio One and Independent Local Radio (Network Chart)
