= She Is Suffering =

1994 single by Manic Street Preachers

Single by Manic Street Preachers

from the album The Holy Bible
- Released: 3 October 1994
- Genre: Post-punk
- Length: 4:44 (album version); 4:07 (single version)
- Label: Epic
- Songwriters: James Dean Bradfield; Sean Moore; Nicky Wire; Richey Edwards
- Producer: Steve Brown

Manic Street Preachers singles chronology
"Revol" (1994)	"She Is Suffering" (1994)	"A Design for Life" (1996)

Music video
- "She Is Suffering" on YouTube

"She Is Suffering" is a song by Welsh alternative rock band Manic Street Preachers. It was released in October 1994 by record label Epic as the third and final single from the band's third studio album, The Holy Bible (1994). It was their last single to feature Richey Edwards before his disappearance on 1 February 1995. The single reached number 25 on the UK Singles Chart on 15 October 1994.

== Content ==
According to its lyricist, Richey Edwards, the song's title refers to "Desire. In other bibles and holy books, no truth is possible until you empty yourself of desire. All commitment otherwise is fake/lies/economic convenience". Nicky Wire also noted, "It's quite a simple song, both musically and lyrically. It's kind of like the Buddhist thing where you can only reach eternal peace by shedding every desire in your body."

== Critical reception ==
Pan-European magazine Music & Media wrote, "You should suffer too if you don't jump on this passionate rock song, their best since 1992's 'Motorcycle Emptiness'. Softies can play "MTV's Most Wanted" acoustic version." Martin Aston from Music Week gave it a score of four out of five, noting that the song "is slower than most of the Manics' predecessors but will still score".

== Promotion ==
Promotion for the single included James Dean Bradfield performing an acoustic version of the song on RTÉ's Sunday afternoon TV/radio simulcast The Beatbox

=== Music video ===
A promo video for the song was directed by Alfonso Doring, which featured performance clips interspersed with shots of art mannequins. In the music magazine Melody Maker, Wire described the music video to "She Is Suffering" as "absolute shite beyond belief". It was released on the band's Forever Delayed video compilation DVD (2002).

== Track listings ==
All lyrics are written by Richey Edwards and Nicky Wire, except as noted; all music is composed by James Dean Bradfield and Sean Moore.

CD single 1
No.	Title	Writer(s)	Length
1.	"She Is Suffering" (7-inch radio edit)		4:07
2.	"Love Torn Us Under"		3:42
3.	"The Drowners" (live) (featuring Bernard Butler)	Brett Anderson, Butler	3:17
4.	"Stay with Me"	Rod Stewart, Ron Wood	3:37

CD single 2
No.	Title	Length
1.	"She Is Suffering" (7-inch radio edit)
2.	"La Tristesse Durera (Scream to a Sigh)" (Vocal Mix) (remixed by the Dust Brothers)
3.	"La Tristesse Durera (Scream to a Sigh)" (Dub Mix) (remixed by the Dust Brothers)
4.	"Faster" (Dub Mix) (remixed by the Dust Brothers)

10-inch vinyl single
No.	Title	Writer(s)	Length
1.	"She Is Suffering" (7-inch radio edit)		4:07
2.	"The Drowners" (live) (featuring Bernard Butler)	Anderson, Butler	3:17
3.	"Stay with Me" (live)	Stewart, Wood	3:37

Cassette single
No.	Title	Length
1.	"She Is Suffering" (7-inch radio edit)
2.	"Love Torn Us Under"

European Maxi-CD single
No.	Title	Writer(s)	Length
1.	"She Is Suffering" (7-inch radio edit)
2.	"The Drowners" (live) (featuring Bernard Butler)	Anderson, Butler	3:17
3.	"Stay with Me" (live)	Stewart, Wood	3:37
4.	"She Is Suffering" (acoustic version) (live on MTV's Most Wanted)		4:01

- All live tracks (excluding the European release) were recorded at the Clapham Grand, Battersea, London, England, on 2 March 1994 in aid of the Philip Hall Memorial Fund for Cancer Research.

== Charts ==
Chart (1994)	Peak position
UK Singles (OCC)	25
