= Revol (song) =

1994 single by Manic Street Preachers

Single by Manic Street Preachers

from the album The Holy BIble
- Released: 1 August 1994
- Genre: Hard rock; noise pop; punk rock; post-punk
- Length: 3:04
- Label: Epic
- Composer(s): James Dean Bradfield, Sean Moore
- Lyricist(s): Nicky Wire, Richey Edwards
- Producer(s): Manic Street Preachers

Manic Street Preachers singles chronology
"Faster" (1994)	"Revol" (1994)	"She Is Suffering" (1994)

"Revol" is a song by the Welsh alternative rock band Manic Street Preachers. It was released in August 1994 by the Epic record label as the second single from their third studio album, The Holy Bible, which was released later in the month. The song reached number 22 in the UK Singles Chart on 13 August 1994.

== Music and lyrics ==
"Revol" has been categorized under the genres hard rock, noise pop, punk rock and post-punk. The song's lyrics were written by the rhythm guitarist Richey Edwards and the bass guitarist Nicky Wire. The verses list famous and controversial names in history, each being dismissed one-by-one in short and often insulting staccato lines (such as "Chamberlain, you see God in you", "Pol Pot, withdrawn traces, bye-bye", "Che Guevara, you're all target now" and "Gorbachev, celibate self-importance").

The track may be considered an autobiographical account of Edwards' attempts to hold down any meaningful relationships. "Revol" is "lover" spelt backwards. The lyric also places the names of famous political figures next to images of failure in sexual and emotional relationships. Wire, however, has said not even he knows exactly what the song is about.

James Dean Bradfield has previously been critical of the song, saying that he hates the UK version. He is, however, a fan of the "US Mix" by Tom Lord-Alge, which can be found on the 10th anniversary re-issue edition of The Holy Bible.

== Release ==
"Revol" was released on 1 August 1994 by Epic as the second single from the band's third studio album, The Holy Bible. It reached number 22 in the UK Singles Chart.

== Track listings ==
CD single 1

1. "Revol" – 3:07
2. "Too Cold Here" – 3:35
3. "You Love Us" (original Heavenly version) – 4:27
4. "Love's Sweet Exile" (Bangkok live) – 3:05

CD single 2

1. "Revol" – 3:07
2. "Drug Drug Druggy" (live) – 3:27
3. "Roses in the Hospital" (live) – 4:46
4. "You Love Us" (live) – 3:04

Cassette

1. "Revol" – 3:07
2. "Too Cold Here" – 3:35

10-inch vinyl

1. "Revol" – 3:07
2. "Too Cold Here" – 3:35
3. "You Love Us" (original Heavenly version) – 4:27
4. "Life Becoming a Landslide" (Bangkok live) – 4:04

== Personnel ==
- James Dean Bradfield – lead vocals, lead guitar
- Richey James – rhythm guitar
- Sean Moore – drums
- Nicky Wire – bass guitar

== Charts ==
Chart (1994)	Peak position
UK Singles (OCC)	22
