= New Art Riot =

EP by Manic Street Preachers
- Released: 25 June 1990
- Recorded: March 1990
- Studios: Workshop Studios, Redditch, Worcestershire, England
- Genre: Punk rock
- Label: Damaged Goods
- Producer: Robin Wynn Evans

Manic Street Preachers chronology
| Suicide Alley (1988) | New Art Riot (1990) | Motown Junk (1991) |

New Art Riot E.P. is an EP by Welsh alternative rock band Manic Street Preachers, released on 25 June 1990 by Damaged Goods. It was the band's first release to feature the four-piece line-up of James Dean Bradfield, Nicky Wire, Richey Edwards and Sean Moore.

Featuring short, fast-paced hard rock songs and influenced by favourites of the group such as The Clash, the EP provided the musical template for the band of what was to come.

== Background ==
On the synthesis behind the record's creation, lyricist and rhythm guitarist Richey Edwards stated: "We've just got pissed off with seeing so much ugliness about. Everybody knows life is ugly, but it seems to me all bands around today want to do is reflect it".

== Recording ==
New Art Riot was recorded in March 1990 at Workshop Studios in Redditch, Worcestershire, England. It was produced by Robin Wynn Evans of The View, Sam Brown and Dodgy fame. When Edwards asked for the sound of a guitar smashing to be added to one of the tracks, Evans replied "smash your guitar then!" The dismembered neck of the guitar was then signed by the band and Evans, and was used as a doorstop at his Perthshire T Pot studio.

== Release and reception ==
New Art Riot was released on 25 June 1990 as a limited edition 12" vinyl of 3,000 copies by record label Damaged Goods. The release led to a reasonable amount of media coverage on the band. Melody Maker qualified the EP as Single of the Week.

The promotional video for the song "Strip It Down" features the band wearing spray-stencil slogans on their shirts, Bradfield sporting bleached blonde hair, performing in front of a psychedelic fractal backdrop.

New Art Riot has since been repressed and reissued on CD and vinyl, as well as being made available digitally.

A live version of "New Art Riot" (titled "New Art Riot in E Minor") featured as a B-side on the band's later single "Faster".

== Track listing ==
All lyrics are written by Nicky Wire and Richey Edwards; all music is composed by James Dean Bradfield and Sean Moore.

Side A: Here
| No. | Title | Length |
|---|---|---|
| 1. | "New Art Riot" | 3:10 |
| 2. | "Strip It Down" | 2:26 |

Side B: There
| No. | Title | Length |
|---|---|---|
| 1. | "Last Exit on Yesterday" | 2:41 |
| 2. | "Teenage 20/20" | 3:01 |

== Personnel ==
Manic Street Preachers

- James Dean Bradfield – vocals, guitar
- Richey Edwards – guitar
- Sean Moore – drums
- Nicky Wire (as Nickey Wire) – bass guitar

Technical personnel

- Mark Tempest – production, engineering
