= Roses in the Hospital =

1993 single by Manic Street Preachers

Single by Manic Street Preachers

from the album Gold Against the Soul
- Released: 20 September 1993
- Genre: Funk; funk rock; Baggy
- Length: 5:02
- Label: Epic
- Songwriters: Richey Edwards; Nicky Wire; James Dean Bradfield; Sean Moore
- Producer: Dave Eringa

Manic Street Preachers singles chronology
"La Tristesse Durera (Scream to a Sigh)" (1993)	"Roses in the Hospital" (1993)	"Life Becoming a Landslide" (1994)

Music video
- "Roses in the Hospital" on YouTube

"Roses in the Hospital" is a song by Welsh alternative rock band Manic Street Preachers. It was released in September 1993 by record label Epic as the third single from their second album, Gold Against the Soul (1993). The song was written by Richey Edwards, Nicky Wire, James Dean Bradfield and Sean Moore, and produced by Dave Eringa. It peaked at number 15 on the UK Singles Chart.

== Content ==
Allison Clarke of LouderSound proclaimed the song's style as "irrepressible funk". Ben Scott of XSNoise detailed the songs styling as "stadium funk-rock with a twist of Bowie's ‘Sound And Vision’".

At the end of the song James Dean Bradfield can be heard singing the line "Rudi gonna fail", a reference to "Rudie Can't Fail", a song by The Clash from their seminal album London Calling. The Manics have cited The Clash as one of the key influences on their sound.

== Release ==
"Roses in the Hospital" was released on 20 September 1993 by record label Epic Records as the third single from the band's second album, Gold Against the Soul. Reaching number 15 on the UK Singles Chart, it would prove to be the highest-charting single from any of the group's first three albums (their cover of "Suicide Is Painless (Theme from M*A*S*H)" had reached number 7 the previous year, but it was not featured on any album). Sales of the single were aided by the band's appearance supporting Bon Jovi at the Milton Keynes Bowl on 18 and 19 September 1993.

The line "we don't want your fucking love" was excised from the radio edit of the song, being replaced by a reiteration of the title. The song's closing refrain of "Forever, ever delayed" would eventually provide the title for the band's greatest hits compilation (Forever Delayed), an album on which "Roses in the Hospital" itself would not make an appearance.

== Track listings ==
- CD
1. "Roses in the Hospital" (7-inch version) – 4:15
2. "Us Against You" – 3:19
3. "Donkeys" – 3:10
4. "Wrote for Luck" (Happy Mondays cover) – 2:42
- 12-inch
1. "Roses in the Hospital" (O G Psychovocal mix) (remixed by Ashley Beedle)
2. "Roses in the Hospital" (O G Psychomental mix) (remixed by Ashley Beedle)
3. "Roses in the Hospital" (51 Funk Salute mix) (remixed by Ashley Beedle)
4. "Roses in the Hospital" (Filet-o-Gang mix) (remixed by Charlie Smith and John Davis)
5. "Roses in the Hospital" (ECG mix) (remixed by Charlie Smith and John Davis)
6. "Roses in the Hospital" (album version)
- 7-inch and cassette
1. "Roses in the Hospital" (7-inch version) – 4:15
2. "Us Against You" – 3:19
3. "Donkeys" – 3:10

== Charts ==
Chart (1993)	Peak position
Europe (Eurochart Hot 100)	50
Israel (Israeli Singles Chart)	24
UK Singles (OCC)	15
UK Airplay (ERA)	43
