= The Everlasting (song) =

Song by Manic Street Preachers

Single by Manic Street Preachers

from the album This Is My Truth Tell Me Yours
- B-side: "Black Holes for the Young"; "Valley Boy"
- Released: 30 November 1998
- Length: 6:11 (album version); 4:07 (edit)
- Label: Epic
- Composers: James Dean Bradfield; Sean Moore
- Lyricist: Nicky Wire
- Producer: Mike Hedges

Manic Street Preachers singles chronology
"If You Tolerate This Your Children Will Be Next" (1998)	"The Everlasting" (1998)	"You Stole the Sun from My Heart" (1999)

"The Everlasting" is the second single to be lifted from the Manic Street Preachers's fifth studio album This Is My Truth Tell Me Yours. It was released on 30 November 1998 through Epic, it peaked on number 11 on the UK Singles Chart, breaking their run of consecutive top-ten hits. All three members of the band—James Dean Bradfield, Sean Moore and Nicky Wire—share the writing credits.

== Background ==
The title, "The Everlasting", was borrowed from a poem by Nicky Wire's brother Patrick Jones, after Wire had spent some time trying to think of a title similar to Blur's "The Universal" or Joy Division's "The Eternal". "The Everlasting" has been described as grand, elegiac and in some ways quite profoundly sad. The lyric hints at life's diminishing returns as one ages and lose one's idealism.

The song features a combination of live and synthetic instrumentation, including acoustic guitar, electric guitar with a tremolo effect, drum loops and real and simulated strings.

A shortened edit of the song is also featured on the 2002 compilation Forever Delayed.

== Release ==
The single was released on 30 November 1998, peaking at number 11 on the UK Singles Chart. It broke their run of five consecutive top-10 hits but stayed on the chart for 12 weeks. Outside the UK the single reached number 47 in the Netherlands, remaining in the chart for five weeks and in Germany it peaked at number 88, remaining on the country's chart for seven weeks. In Iceland, it peaked at number three.

The first of two CD singles included "Black Holes for the Young" - a duet with Sophie Ellis-Bextor which is a criticism of London culture - and "Valley Boy". The second CD single featured remixes of "The Everlasting" - "Deadly Avenger Mix" and "Stealth Sonic Orchestra Mix".

=== Promotional video ===
The promotional video that accompanied the song was censored because it included shots of people on fire. The original version was considered insensitive as the release of the single coincided with the well-publicised inquest into the death of Michael Menson, who had been set on fire by three men in a street attack. Two versions of the video were therefore produced - one with computer generated flames, one without. The video was filmed at Euston railway station in London.

== Track listings ==
All music was written by James Dean Bradfield and Sean Moore except where indicated. All were lyrics written by Nick Jones except where indicated.

CD single 1 (UK) Epic 666593 2

1. "The Everlasting" – 6:11
2. "Black Holes for the Young" (featuring Sophie Ellis-Bextor) – 4:11
3. "Valley Boy" – 5:10

CD single 2 (UK) Epic 666686 5

1. "The Everlasting" – 6:11
2. "The Everlasting" (Deadly Avenger Psalm 315) – 5:42
3. "The Everlasting" (Stealth Sonic Orchestra Remix) – 5:11

CD single (EU) Epic EPC 666593 1

1. "The Everlasting" – 6:11
2. "Black Holes for the Young" (featuring Sophie Ellis-Bextor) – 4:11

CD single (Australia) Epic 6668542

1. "The Everlasting" – 6:11
2. "Black Holes for the Young" (featuring Sophie Ellis-Bextor) – 4:11
3. "Valley Boy" – 5:10
4. "The Everlasting" (Deadly Avenger's Psalm 315) – 5:42
5. "The Everlasting" (Stealth Sonic Orchestra Remix) – 5:11

Cassette single (UK) EPC 666686 4

1. "The Everlasting" – 6:09
2. "Small Black Flowers That Grow in the Sky (Live At Manchester Nynex)" (lyrics: Richey James) – 3:34

12-inch vinyl single (UK) Sony XPR3297

A1. "The Everlasting" (Deadly Avenger's Psalm 315) – 5:40
A2. "The Everlasting" (Deadly Avenger's Psalm 315 Instrumental) – 5:40
B1. "The Everlasting" (Deadly Avenger's 69th St. Mix) – 4:46
B2. "The Everlasting" (Deadly Avenger's 69th St. Instrumental) – 4:51

== Charts ==
=== Weekly charts ===
Chart (1998–1999)	Peak position
Europe (Eurochart Hot 100)	55
Germany (GfK)	88
Iceland (Íslenski Listinn Topp 40)	3
Ireland (IRMA)	22
Italy Airplay (Music & Media)	4
Netherlands (Dutch Top 40 Tipparade)	7
Netherlands (Single Top 100)	47
Scottish Singles Sales (Official Charts)	9
UK Singles (Official Charts)	11

=== Year-end charts ===
Chart (1998)	Position
UK Singles (OCC)	186
