= La Tristesse Durera (Scream to a Sigh) =

1993 single by Manic Street Preachers

Single by Manic Street Preachers

from the album Gold Against the Soul
- Released: 19 July 1993
- Genre: Soft rock
- Length: 4:13 (album version); 4:07 (Forever Delayed edit); 3:57 (7-inch version)
- Label: Columbia
- Songwriters: Richey Edwards; Nicky Wire; James Dean Bradfield; Sean Moore
- Producer: Dave Eringa

Manic Street Preachers singles chronology
| "From Despair to Where" (1993) | "La Tristesse Durera (Scream to a Sigh)" (1993) | "Roses in the Hospital" (1993) |

Music video
- "La Tristesse Durera (Scream to a Sigh)" on YouTube

"La Tristesse Durera (Scream to a Sigh)" is a song by Welsh rock band Manic Street Preachers. It was released in July 1993 by record label Columbia as the second single from their second studio album, Gold Against the Soul (1993). It reached number 22 on the UK Singles Chart.

== Content and composition ==
The song's title is taken from the reported last words of Vincent van Gogh, "La tristesse durera toujours", quoted in a letter from his younger brother Theo to their sister Elisabeth, using her nickname Lies. The letter was translated by Robert Harrison, who states that the phrase means "The sadness will last forever".

The song lyrics are written from the perspective of a war veteran, containing the line "wheeled out once a year, a cenotaph souvenir" and tracking the bathetic progress of the former soldier's war medal: "It sells at market stalls/Parades Milan catwalks". Richey Edwards told Melody Maker newspaper, "It's a beautiful image when the war veterans turn out at the Cenotaph, [...] and everyone pretends to care ... but then they're shuffled off again and forgotten." According to Nicky Wire, he wrote much of the song and came up with its title, whilst Edwards contributed the "scream to a sigh" refrain. Wire has stated that his objective in writing the song was "to write about war heroes in a sympathetic way", an aim which he described as "non-trendy".

According to Martin Power in his book Manic Street Preachers, the band "sounded at sixes and sevens" in the rest of the album, "Yet, as with Generation Terrorists, they had again produced one genuine classic in the form of 'La Tristessa Durera (Scream to a Sigh)'." According to Sean Moore the track's drum part was the result of an attempt to copy a song by hip-hop group Arrested Development. James Dean Bradfield also cited the Clash's song "Car Jamming" as an influence.

Edwards, unusually, played rhythm guitar on the track. Edwards was credited for rhythm guitar on all of the tracks released during his tenure with the band, but almost never actually performed the parts he was credited for due to his self-acknowledged lack of talent with the instrument. This would be only one of two tracks he would perform on, the other being a partial recording on Everything Must Go's "No Surface All Feeling".

The B-side, "Patrick Bateman", is a "tribute" to the American Psycho character.

== Release ==
"La Tristesse Durera (Scream to a Sigh)" was released as a single on 19 July 1993 by record label Columbia. It reached number 22 in the UK Singles Chart on 31 July. In the US, a promotional version was released as "Scream to a Sigh (La Tristesse Durera)". The song made an appearance in edited form on Forever Delayed (28 October 2002), the Manics' greatest hits album. The remastered album version appeared on the National Treasures – The Complete Singles, compilation.

== Accolades ==
"La Tristesse Durera (Scream to a Sigh)" was included in Robert Dimery's 1001 Songs You Must Hear Before You Die.

== Track listings ==
CD

| No. | Title | Length |
|---|---|---|
| 1. | "La Tristesse Durera (Scream to a Sigh)" (7-inch version) | 3:57 |
| 2. | "Patrick Bateman" | 6:32 |
| 3. | "What's My Name" (live the Clash cover at Cambridge Junction, 20 October 1992) | 1:42 |
| 4. | "Slash 'n' Burn" (live at Norwich UEA, 21 October 1992) | 3:45 |

12-inch

Side A
| No. | Title | Length |
|---|---|---|
| 1. | "La Tristesse Durera (Scream to a Sigh)" (full album version) | 4:13 |
| 2. | "Patrick Bateman" | 6:32 |

Side B
| No. | Title | Length |
|---|---|---|
| 1. | "Repeat" (live in Norwich, 21 October 1992) | 3:06 |
| 2. | "Tennessee (I Get Low)" | 3:28 |

Cassette

Side A
| No. | Title | Length |
|---|---|---|
| 1. | "La Tristesse Durera (Scream to a Sigh)" (7-inch version) | 3:57 |

Side B
| No. | Title | Length |
|---|---|---|
| 1. | "Patrick Bateman" | 6:32 |

== Charts ==
| Chart (1993) | Peak position |
|---|---|
| UK Singles (Official Charts) | 22 |
| UK Airplay (Music Week) | 29 |
