= If You Tolerate This Your Children Will Be Next =

1998 single by Manic Street Preachers

Single by Manic Street Preachers

from the album This Is My Truth Tell Me Yours
- Released: 24 August 1998
- Studio: Rockfield (Wales)
- Genre: Alternative rock; Britpop
- Length: 4:51
- Label: Epic
- Composers: James Dean Bradfield; Sean Moore
- Lyricist: Nick Jones
- Producer: Dave Eringa

Manic Street Preachers singles chronology
"Australia" (1996)	"If You Tolerate This Your Children Will Be Next" (1998)	"The Everlasting" (1998)

Music video
- "If You Tolerate This Your Children Will Be Next" on YouTube

"If You Tolerate This Your Children Will Be Next" is a song by Welsh alternative rock band Manic Street Preachers. It was released on 24 August 1998, through Epic Records as the first single from their fifth studio album, This Is My Truth Tell Me Yours (1998). The track sold 156,000 copies in its first week and reached number one on the UK Singles Chart in August 1998. Outside the United Kingdom, the song reached number one in Iceland and the top 20 in Norway and Sweden. It became the band's only song to chart in North America, peaking at number 19 on the Canadian RPM Alternative 30 chart.

== Background ==
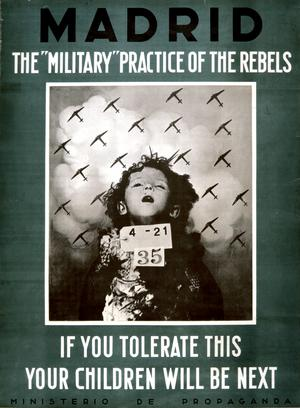
The 1930s poster that inspired the song's title

The song's theme is inspired by the Spanish Civil War, and the idealism of Welsh volunteers who joined the left-wing International Brigades against the military insurrection led by Francisco Franco. The song takes its name from a Republican propaganda poster of the time written in English and displaying a photograph of a child killed by the Nationalists, under a sky filled with bomber aircraft, with the song's titular warning written at the bottom.

Nicky Wire wrote the song's lyrics in Barcelona. He felt especially proud of coming up with the opening line: "The future teaches you to be alone, the present to be afraid and cold." Various real-life events from the Spanish Civil War provided inspiration. For example, the line "If I can shoot rabbits/then I can shoot fascists" is attributed to a remark made by John ("Tom") Thomas, a Welsh miner who fought on the Republican side. This was originally quoted in the book Miners Against Fascism by Hywel Francis. Another line, "I've walked Las Ramblas/but not with real intent", references La Rambla, an area in Barcelona which experienced much fighting during the war. Wire has acknowledged that he was inspired by a song by the Clash, "Spanish Bombs", which features a similar subject.

The song was not originally intended for inclusion on This Is My Truth Tell Me Yours. It was recorded in a separate session from the rest of the album and was seen as a potential B-side; its original demo was described by bassist Nicky Wire as "crap."

== Release ==
The song was released in the United Kingdom on 24 August 1998 as two CD singles. The first disc includes versions of "Prologue to History" and "Montana/Autumn/78", and the second features a remix by Massive Attack and a mix by David Holmes. Six days later, the single secured the number-one spot on the UK Singles Chart despite competition from "One for Sorrow" by Steps, which was released the same day. It has sold more than 600,000 copies in the UK and has been certified platinum by the British Phonographic Industry (BPI). It became the group's biggest success on the Irish Singles Chart, reaching number three, and is the only Manic Street Preachers track to be released as a single in the United States and Canada. Although it did not appear on any US Billboard chart, it became a moderate rock hit in Canada, peaking at number 19 on the RPM Alternative 30 chart for two weeks in August 1999.

The single was a success in Sweden, where it reached number 21 and stayed in the chart for a total of 10 weeks. In Germany it reached number 79 and in the Netherlands, number 62; in both countries it remained on the charts for nine weeks. In Norway the song only charted for two weeks despite reaching number 19. It reached number 49 in Australia and number 44 in New Zealand. In Japan, the single was released on 26 August 1998. "If You Tolerate This Your Children Will Be Next" was nominated in the category of Best British Single at the 1999 BRIT Awards, losing to "Angels" by Robbie Williams.

In March 2009, it was discovered that the song was used on the website of the British National Party as the soundtrack of an article describing "the violence, hatred, fragmentation and despair" wrought on London by the "great multicultural experiment". The choice of this song was considered ironic by many, considering the song contains lyrics such as "So if I can shoot rabbits/Then I can shoot fascists". Record company Sony successfully had the song removed from the site on the grounds of unauthorised use. The BNP later released a press statement claiming that "the song had mistakenly been automatically streamed on to its site and had nothing to do with the official party", and that "you can interpret the lyrics any way you want".

== Music video ==
The melody of the socialist anthem, "The Internationale" can be heard at the start and end of the video, played on a musical box. This was a popular song on the Republican side during the Spanish Civil War.

Wire praised the single's video, directed by W.I.Z. It features a typical nuclear family but with their eyes, mouths and ears sealed over with a flesh toned applicant with James Dean Bradfield also having his eyes sealed over by the same applicant in the last few seconds of the video. The family seem to exist in a futuristic show room, fashioned into a highly clinical 'home' of sorts. Nicky Wire described the video as "surreal, mildly disturbing ... with a suffocating feel to it despite its brightness." It was the fourth and final video directed by W.I.Z. for the band.

== Legacy ==
The song is in the Guinness World Records as the number one single with the longest title without brackets. The song was voted number 20 on Channel 4's "100 Greatest Number One Singles" list. The song was performed at the Concert for Ukraine by the band on 29 March 2022.

== Track listings ==
All music was written by James Dean Bradfield and Sean Moore except where indicated. All lyrics were written by Nick Jones except where indicated.

UK CD1
No.	Title	Length
1.	"If You Tolerate This Your Children Will Be Next"	4:50
2.	"Prologue to History"	4:43
3.	"Montana/Autumn/78"	3:12

UK CD2
No.	Title	Length
1.	"If You Tolerate This Your Children Will Be Next"	4:50
2.	"If You Tolerate This Your Children Will Be Next" (Massive Attack remix)	4:54
3.	"If You Tolerate This Your Children Will Be Next" (David Holmes remix/The Class Reunion of the Sunset Marquis mix)	10:02

UK cassette single
No.	Title	Length
1.	"If You Tolerate This Your Children Will Be Next"	4:50
2.	"Kevin Carter" (live at Manchester NYNEX, 24 May 1997) (lyrics: Richey James)	3:22

== Credits and personnel ==
Credits are lifted from the This Is My Truth Tell Me Yours album booklet.

Studios

- Recorded at Rockfield Studios (Wales)
- Mixed at AIR Studios (London, England)

Personnel

- James Dean Bradfield – music, vocals, acoustic guitar, 12-string guitar
- Sean Moore – music, drums
- Nicky Wire – lyrics (as Nick Jones), bass
- Nick Nasmyth – Wurlitzer, Hammond, Mellotron
- Andy Duncan – percussion
- Dave Eringa – production, engineering, mixing
- Lee Butler – production and engineering assistance
- Jon Bailey – mixing assistance

== Charts ==
=== Weekly charts ===
Weekly chart performance for "If You Tolerate This Your Children Will Be Next"
Chart (1998–1999)	Peak position
Australia (ARIA)	49
Belgium (Ultratip Bubbling Under Flanders)	13
Canada Rock/Alternative (RPM)	19
Europe (Eurochart Hot 100)	9
Germany (GfK)	79
Iceland (Íslenski Listinn Topp 40)	1
Ireland (IRMA)	3
Netherlands (Dutch Top 40 Tipparade)	7
Netherlands (Single Top 100)	62
New Zealand (Recorded Music NZ)	44
Norway (VG-lista)	19
Scottish Singles Sales (Official Charts)	3
Sweden (Sverigetopplistan)	21
UK Singles (Official Charts)	1

=== Year-end charts ===
Year-end chart performance for "If You Tolerate This Your Children Will Be Next"
Chart (1998)	Position
Iceland (Íslenski Listinn Topp 40)	3
UK Singles (OCC)	46

== Certifications ==
Certifications for "If You Tolerate This Your Children Will Be Next"
Region	Certification	Certified units/sales
New Zealand (RMNZ)	Gold	15,000^{‡}
United Kingdom (BPI)	Platinum	600,000^{‡}
^{‡} Sales+streaming figures based on certification alone.

== Covers ==
The song was covered by David Usher on his 2003 album Hallucinations. DJ Eric Chase recorded a cover of the song in December 2009. Radiohead frontman Thom Yorke occasionally sang portions of the song during live performances of "Everything in Its Right Place" during Radiohead's 2001 tour.
