= Little Baby Nothing =

Song by Manic Street Preachers

Single by Manic Street Preachers

from the album Generation Terrorists
- B-side: "Dead Yankee Drawl"; "Suicide Alley"; "Never Want Again"
- Released: 9 November 1992
- Studio: Black Barn (London, England)
- Genre: Glam metal; soft rock
- Length: 5:00
- Label: Columbia
- Composers: James Dean Bradfield; Sean Moore
- Lyricists: Nicky Wire; Richey Edwards
- Producer: Steve Brown

Manic Street Preachers singles chronology
"Theme from M.A.S.H. (Suicide Is Painless)" (1992)	"Little Baby Nothing" (1992)	"From Despair to Where" (1993)

"Little Baby Nothing" is a song recorded by Welsh rock band Manic Street Preachers for their debut studio album, Generation Terrorists (1992). It was released on 9 November 1992 by Columbia Records as the sixth and final single from the album. The song features guest vocals by American actress and singer Traci Lords.

== Content ==
"Little Baby Nothing" features vocals by former pornographic actress Traci Lords. The song is about the sexual exploitation of a woman, and Lords agreed to a duet with the band's singer-lead guitarist James Dean Bradfield. Bradfield said: "we needed somebody, a symbol, a person that could actually symbolize the lyrics and justify them to a certain degree. Traci was more than happy to do it. She saw the lyrics, and she had an immediate affinity with them. It was definitely easy to incorporate her personality into the lyrics. We just wanted a symbol for it, and I think she was a great symbol. She sounds like a female Joey Ramone to me." Lords said that "I listened to the tape and really identified with the character in the song... this young girl who's been exploited and abused by men all her life." In an interview some years later, she said that she was distressed at the news of the disappearance and presumed suicide of the band's guitarist-lyricist Richey Edwards.

Originally, the band wanted the duet to feature vocals by Australian singer Kylie Minogue, but she could not be released from her PWL contracts. She later performed the song live with the group. She also collaborated with them on her 1997 album Impossible Princess.

The B-side "Suicide Alley" had previously been released as the Manics' debut single. It was included on all formats (except CD2) as copies of the original 7-inch release were already fetching £250–300 at auction. The inclusion of the song on CD also upset Glen Powell's plans to reissue the single. Powell had produced the original version and still owned the master tapes.

== Music video ==
The promotional video for the song was directed by GobTV (music journalist Steven Wells and Nick Small) and featured the first appearance on screen by pop duo Shampoo.

== Track listings ==
All music was composed by James Dean Bradfield and Sean Moore. All lyrics were written by Nicky Wire and Richey Edwards.

CD1

No.	Title	Length
1.	"Little Baby Nothing" (7-inch version)	4:13
2.	"Never Want Again"	3:37
3.	"Dead Yankee Drawl"	3:45
4.	"Suicide Alley"	2:27

CD2

No.	Title	Length
1.	"Little Baby Nothing" (7-inch version)	4:13
2.	"R.P. McMurphy" (live at Club Citta, Kawasaki, 13 May 1992)	4:44
3.	"Tennessee" (live at Club Citta, Kawasaki, 13 May 1992)	2:29
4.	"You Love Us" (live at Club Citta, Kawasaki, 13 May 1992)	4:30

7-inch

Side A
No.	Title	Length
1.	"Little Baby Nothing" (7-inch version)	4:13

Side B
No.	Title	Length
1.	"Never Want Again"	3:37
2.	"Suicide Alley"	2:27

Cassette

No.	Title	Length
1.	"Little Baby Nothing" (7-inch version)	4:13
2.	"Never Want Again"	3:37
3.	"Suicide Alley"	2:27

1997 CD re-release

No.	Title	Length
1.	"Little Baby Nothing" (7-inch version)	4:13
2.	"Dead Yankee Drawl"	3:45
3.	"Suicide Alley"	2:27
4.	"Never Want Again"	3:37

== Charts ==
Chart (1992)	Peak position
UK Singles (Official Charts)	29
UK Airplay (Music Week)	29
