= Suicide Is Painless =

Theme song of M*A*S*H film & TV series

- European picture sleeve

Single by The Mash

from the album M*A*S*H (Original Soundtrack Recording)
- B-side: "The M*A*S*H March"
- Released: 1970
- Recorded: 1969
- Length: 2:53
- Label: Columbia/CBS
- Composer: Johnny Mandel
- Lyricist: Mike Altman
- Producer: Thomas Z. Shepard

Music video
- "Suicide Is Painless" (audio) on YouTube

"Suicide Is Painless" (also known as "Theme from M*A*S*H" or "Song from M*A*S*H") is a song written by Johnny Mandel (music) and Michael Altman (lyrics) for the 1970 film M*A*S*H. In addition to being performed by characters in the film, it plays during the title sequence as sung by The Ron Hicklin Singers. An instrumental version was used as the theme music for the TV series based on the film, playing over the opening and closing credits.

== Background ==
The song was written for Ken Prymus, the actor playing Private Seidman, to sing during the faux-suicide of Walter "Painless Pole" Waldowski (John Schuck) in the film's "Last Supper" scene. Director Robert Altman had two stipulations about the song for composer Johnny Mandel: it had to be called "Suicide Is Painless" and it had to be the "stupidest song ever written". Altman attempted to write the lyrics himself, but, upon finding it too difficult for his "45-year-old brain" to write something "stupid" enough, he gave the task to his 15-year-old-son Michael, who reportedly wrote the lyrics in five minutes.

Altman later decided that the song worked so well he would use it as the film's main theme. This more choral version was sung by uncredited session singers John Bahler, Tom Bahler, Ron Hicklin, and Ian Freebairn-Smith, and was released as a single attributed to "The Mash". Altman said that, while he made only $70,000 for directing the movie, his son had earned more than $1 million for co-writing the song.

Several instrumental versions of the song were used as the theme for the TV series, but the lyrics were never used in the show. The vocal version from the film's opening credits became a number-one hit in the UK Singles Chart in May 1980. The song was ranked No. 66 on AFI's 100 Years...100 Songs.

== Track listing ==
7″ vinyl

- West Germany: CBS / 5009
- UK: CBS / S CBS 8536
- US: Columbia / 4M-45130 [mono promo only]
- US: Columbia / 4S-45130 [original stereo stock release]

A-side
No.	Title	Writer(s)	Artist	Length
1.	"Theme from M*A*S*H Suicide Is Painless"	Johnny Mandel, Mike Altman	The Mash	2:53

B-side
No.	Title	Writer(s)	Artist	Length
1.	"The M*A*S*H March"	Mandel	Johnny Mandel	1:19

== Charts ==
Chart (1970)	Peak position
Dutch GfK chart	3
Dutch Top 40	4
Chart (1980)	Peak position
Australia (Kent Music Report)	52
UK Singles Chart	1
Irish Singles Chart	1

== Manic Street Preachers version ==
"Theme from M.A.S.H. (Suicide Is Painless)"

Single by Manic Street Preachers

from the album Ruby Trax
- A-side: "(Everything I Do) I Do It for You" (by the Fatima Mansions)
- B-side: "Sleeping with the NME"; "Spectators of Suicide"; "Star Lover"; "Never Want Again"; "Dead Yankee Drawl"; "Ain't Goin' Down"
- Released: September 7, 1992
- Genre: Alternative rock; soft rock
- Length: 3:43
- Label: Columbia
- Composer: Johnny Mandel
- Lyricist: Mike Altman
- Producer: Manic Street Preachers

Manic Street Preachers singles chronology
"Motorcycle Emptiness" (1992)	"Theme from M.A.S.H. (Suicide Is Painless)" (1992)	"Little Baby Nothing" (1992)

Welsh alternative rock band Manic Street Preachers released a cover version of "Suicide Is Painless" on September 7, 1992, as "Theme from M.A.S.H. (Suicide Is Painless)". In the UK, it was a double A-side charity single to help The Spastics Society, with the Fatima Mansions' take on Bryan Adams' "(Everything I Do) I Do It for You" as the other A-side. The 12-inch and CD versions of the UK single included "Sleeping with the NME" – an excerpt from a radio documentary recorded in the offices of the NME capturing staff's reaction to photographs of guitarist Richey Edwards' infamous self-mutilation. The single peaked at number seven on the UK Singles Chart spending three weeks in the top 10.

=== Track listings ===
7-inch vinyl

- UK: Columbia / 658382 7

Side A
No.	Title	Writer(s)	Artist	Length
1.	"Theme from M.A.S.H. (Suicide Is Painless)"	Johnny Mandel, Mike Altman	Manic Street Preachers	3:40

Side B
No.	Title	Writer(s)	Artist	Length
1.	"(Everything I Do) I Do It for You"	Bryan Adams, Michael Kamen, Robert John "Mutt" Lange	The Fatima Mansions	6:26

- Netherlands: Columbia / COL 658385 7

Side A
No.	Title	Writer(s)	Length
1.	"Theme from M.A.S.H. (Suicide Is Painless)"	Mandel, Altman

Side B
No.	Title	Writer(s)	Length
1.	"Spectators of Suicide"	James Dean Bradfield, Nicky Wire, Sean Moore, Richey James Edwards

12-inch vinyl

- UK: Columbia / 658382 6

Side A
No.	Title	Writer(s)	Artist	Length
1.	"Theme from M.A.S.H. (Suicide Is Painless)"	Mandel, Altman	Manic Street Preachers

Side B
No.	Title	Writer(s)	Artist	Length
1.	"(Everything I Do) I Do It for You"	Adams, Kamen, Lange	The Fatima Mansions
2.	"Sleeping with the N.M.E."		Manic Street Preachers

CD

- UK: Columbia / 658382 2

No.	Title	Writer(s)	Artist	Length
1.	"Theme from M.A.S.H. (Suicide Is Painless)"	Mandel, Altman	Manic Street Preachers
2.	"(Everything I Do) I Do It for You"	Adams, Kamen, Lange	The Fatima Mansions
3.	"Sleeping with the N.M.E."		Manic Street Preachers

- Europe: Columbia / 658385 2

No.	Title	Writer(s)	Length
1.	"Theme from M.A.S.H. (Suicide Is Painless)"	Mandel, Altman
2.	"Spectators of Suicide"	Bradfield, Wire, Moore, Edwards
3.	"Star Lover"	Bradfield, Wire, Moore, Edwards

- Japan: Epic/Sony / ESCA 5668

No.	Title	Writer(s)	Length
1.	"Theme from M.A.S.H. (Suicide Is Painless)"	Mandel, Altman	3:43
2.	"Never Want Again"		3:39
3.	"Dead Yankee Drawl"		3:46
4.	"Ain't Goin' Down"		3:08

=== Charts ===
==== Weekly charts ====
Chart (1992)	Peak position
Europe (Eurochart Hot 100)	26
Ireland (IRMA)	12
Israel (IBA)	13
New Zealand (Recorded Music NZ)	40
Sweden (Sverigetopplistan)	21
UK Singles (Official Charts)	7
UK Airplay (Music Week)	17

==== Year-end charts ====
Chart (1992)	Position
UK Singles (OCC)	98

=== Release history ===
Region	Version	Date	Format(s)	Label(s)	Ref.
United Kingdom	with "(Everything I Do) I Do It for You"	September 7, 1992	7-inch vinyl; 12-inch vinyl; CD; cassette	Columbia	
Australia	Solo	October 19, 1992	CD; cassette	Columbia	
Japan	Solo	October 21, 1992	CD	Epic	

== Other Cover versions ==
- Swedish group Small Town Singers released a version under the title "Song from M*A*S*H" in 1975. The single peaked at 17th position in Sweden, Top 100 chart in Australia.
