= Faster (Manic Street Preachers song) =

1994 single by Manic Street Preachers

Single by Manic Street Preachers

from the album The Holy Bible
- Released: 31 May 1994
- Recorded: 1994
- Genre: Alternative rock; hard rock; punk rock; post-punk
- Length: 3:55
- Label: Epic
- Songwriters: James Dean Bradfield, Nicky Wire, Sean Moore, Richey Edwards
- Producer: Manic Street Preachers

Manic Street Preachers singles chronology
"Life Becoming a Landslide" (1993)	"Faster" (1994)	"Revol" (1994)

"Faster" is a song by Welsh alternative rock band Manic Street Preachers. It was released in 1994 by record label Epic as the first single from the band's third studio album, The Holy Bible.

The single reached number 16 in the UK Singles Chart. "Faster" is the only song featured on The Holy Bible that was included on their 2002 compilation album Forever Delayed.

== Details ==
=== Influences and writing ===
Drummer Sean Moore has stated that the template for the song was "From Out of Nowhere", a 1989 track by American band Faith No More. James Dean Bradfield has also cited the Sex Pistols' Never Mind the Bollocks as a musical influence on the song, in particular with regard to his vocals: "Sometimes the way Johnny Rotten’s voice goes down the middle of a song and barely changes, it’s about the twists and phrases and the commitment to the words. And that’s exactly what it needed, that straight line through the middle".

=== Music and lyrics ===
"Faster" has been categorised under the genres alternative rock, hard rock, punk rock and post-punk. Rhythm guitarist Richey Edwards and bass guitarist Nicky Wire wrote the lyrics of both "P.C.P." and "Faster". Interviewed around the time of the single's release, Wire described "P.C.P." as being about how "PC followers take up the idea of being liberal, but end up being quite the opposite". He also said that he was "completely confused" by "Faster", although Edwards had told him that it was about self-abuse.

=== Samples ===
The quote "I hate purity. Hate goodness. I don't want virtue to exist anywhere. I want everyone corrupt" played at the start of "Faster" comes from the movie based on George Orwell's novel Nineteen Eighty-Four, featuring the voice of John Hurt.

The quote at the end of "P.C.P.", "227 'Lears' and I can't remember the first line", was spoken by Albert Finney in the 1983 film The Dresser.

== Release ==
"Faster" was released on 31 May 1994 by record label Epic as the first single from the band's third studio album, The Holy Bible. It reached number 16 in the UK Singles Chart.

== Reception ==
"Faster" was ranked as the 80th best alternative rock song of 1994 by Kyle McGovern at Spin, who state "Underproduced vocals aside, "Faster" is one of those songs that holds up way better than you'd ever imagine possible." Emily Mackay named it as the 5th best Manic Street Preachers song at The Guardian. Mackay opined "Its darkly rushing chorus is a perfect example of how Bradfield's music lifted Edwards' lyrics into something that, though harsh, was also full of an almost joyous energy, a mile-a-minute thrill and a sense of limitless audacity." James Forryan of HMV selected the song as one of the band's 5 highlights, who regarded it as among the best examples of Edwards' "peak of his powers as lyricist."

In 2011, NME ranked the song number two on their list of the 10 greatest Manic Street Preachers songs, and in 2022, The Guardian ranked the song number one on their list of the 30 greatest Manic Street Preachers songs. In 2014, NME ranked the song 217th in their 500 Greatest Songs of All Time list. They later placed it at number 1 in their list of 40 Essential Manic Street Preachers Tracks, with James Dean Bradfield saying "It's one of Richey's soothsaying lyrics. There's a lot of prophesy, in terms of the acceleration of everything, joy, pain, death, consumerism."

== Top of the Pops performance ==
The band performed "Faster" on the BBC's Top of the Pops, with lead singer James Dean Bradfield wearing an IRA-style balaclava with his first name scrawled over his forehead and the rest of the band wearing military regalia. Many viewers interpreted this as a show of support for the IRA, and the BBC told the band that a record number of complaints (over 25,000) had been received.

== Track listing ==
CD

1. "Faster" – 3:54
2. "P.C.P." – 3:53
3. "Sculpture of Man" – 1:53
4. "New Art Riot (In E Minor)" – 3:00

10" vinyl

1. "P.C.P." – 3:53
2. "Faster" – 3:54
3. "Sculpture of Man" – 1:53

7" vinyl / Cassette

1. "Faster" – 3:54
2. "P.C.P." – 3:53

== Charts ==
Chart performance for "Faster"
Chart (1994)	Peak position
UK Singles Chart	16
