= Life Becoming a Landslide =

1994 EP by Manic Street Preachers

EP by Manic Street Preachers
- Released: 31 January 1994
- Studio: Outside (Checkendon, Oxfordshire, England)
- Label: Epic
- Producer: Dave Eringa

Manic Street Preachers chronology
Roses in the Hospital (1993)	Life Becoming a Landslide (1994)	Faster (1994)

Life Becoming a Landslide E.P. is an extended play (EP) by Welsh alternative rock band Manic Street Preachers. The title track is taken from their second album, Gold Against the Soul. It was released by Epic on 31 January 1994 and reached number 36 on the UK Singles Chart.

== Background ==
It remains an important insight into the mindset of the band's lyricist/guitarist Richey Edwards, and a poignant exploration of the metamorphosis of child and adult roles. Certain lines in the song, such as "My idea of love comes from a childhood glimpse of pornography", exemplify this. It could also be seen as a precursor to the fully orchestrated, epic sound the band would adopt after Edwards' disappearance, precluded by the aggressive guitar sound of The Holy Bible album.

== Release ==
The EP is noted for its B-side "Comfort Comes": the first Manics track to explore the raw, claustrophobic, cold yet impassioned aesthetic which would be illustrated on The Holy Bible. The release reached number 36 on the UK Singles Chart in February 1994.

== Track listings ==
CD

1. "Life Becoming a Landslide" – 3:58
2. "Comfort Comes" – 3:29
3. "Are Mothers Saints" – 3:20
4. "Charles Windsor" (McCarthy cover) – 1:39

12-inch

1. "Life Becoming a Landslide" – 3:58
2. "Comfort Comes" – 3:29
3. "Are Mothers Saints" – 3:20

7-inch / Cassette

1. "Life Becoming a Landslide" – 3:58
2. "Comfort Comes" – 3:29

== Charts ==
Chart (1994)	Peak position
UK Singles (OCC)	36
