= Sean Moore (musician) =

Welsh musician (born 1968)

Sean Anthony Moore
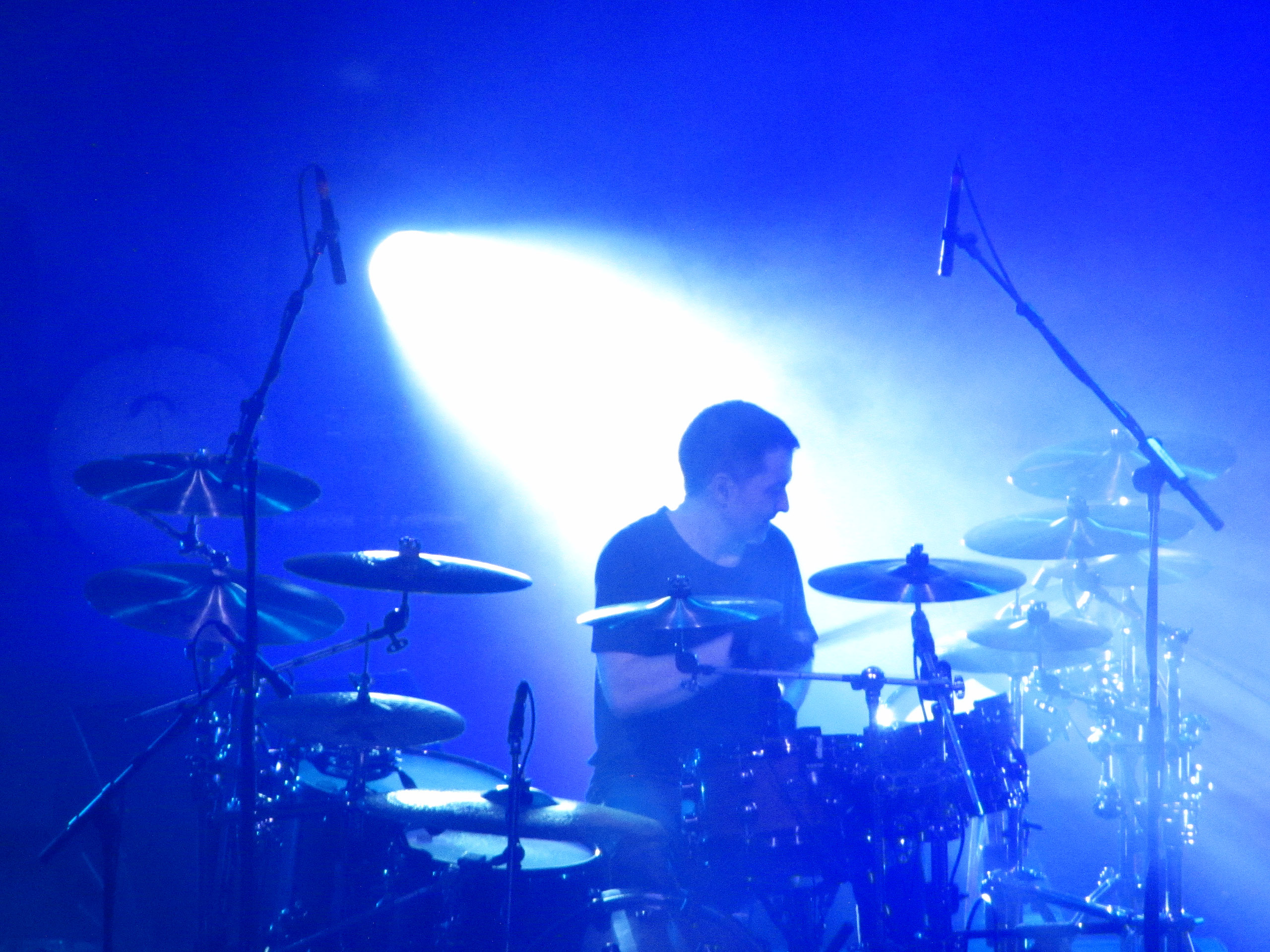
- Moore performing with Manic Street Preachers in 2014

Background information
- Born: Sean Anthony Moore; 30 July 1968 (age 58)
- Origin: Pontypool, Torfaen, Wales
- Genres: Alternative rock; hard rock; post-punk; punk rock; glam punk
- Occupations: Musician; songwriter
- Instruments: Drums; trumpet
- Years active: 1986–present
- Label: Columbia

Sean Anthony Moore (born 30 July 1968) is a Welsh musician and songwriter. He is best known for being the drummer and occasional trumpet-player of the Welsh alternative rock band Manic Street Preachers. He is cousin to bandmate James Dean Bradfield.

== Early years ==
Born on 30 July 1968 in Pontypool, Torfaen, Moore attended Oakdale Comprehensive in Oakdale, Caerphilly, with his cousin James Dean Bradfield, and other future band members Nicky Wire and Richey Edwards. He previously worked at the UK Patent Office and when he resigned when Manics got their recording contract, he was asked was it wise to leave as if he “worked hard, he could eventually become an Administrative Officer”, to which he allegedly replied “No thanks, I think I’ll take my chances”.

== Roles in the band ==
Simon Price wrote in Everything (A Book About Manic Street Preachers) that "Sean Moore is quite possibly the only person in rock who doesn't take the Manics seriously". According to his bandmates, he is the band's "musical driving force". In their early days, he was often mistaken for a woman due to his long hair, naturally effeminate features and small stature. He is the only current member of the Manic Street Preachers who has not released a solo album.

=== Driving and football ===
Moore also has a strong interest in motoring, and set the 22nd-fastest lap time around the Nürburgring, Germany, in an Audi RS 4 in 8 minutes 25 seconds. Manics singer James Dean Bradfield mentioned this before playing "Motown Junk" as part of the annual Rock am Ring festival at the track. Moore is a fan of Michael Schumacher.

Sean supports Liverpool Football Club and was present when Liverpool won the first FA Cup Final to be held at the Millennium Stadium, Cardiff, in May 2001.
