= Louder Than War (video) =

Video by Manic Street Preachers
- Released: 24 September 2001
- Recorded: 17 February 2001
- Venues: Karl Marx Theatre, Havana, Cuba
- Genre: Alternative rock
- Label: Epic

Manic Street Preachers video album chronology
Leaving the 20th Century (2000)	Louder Than War (2001)	Forever Delayed (2002)

Louder Than War is a concert film of the Welsh alternative rock band Manic Street Preachers' performance at the Karl Marx Theatre, Havana, Cuba on 17 February 2001. It was released on DVD on 24 September the same year by Epic Records.

The concert was one of the first times a western rock band had played in Cuba. Fidel Castro was in attendance, and met the band before the concert. The film's title came from a conversation between the band and Castro; after the band warned him that the concert would be very loud, Castro responded (through his translator), "It cannot be louder than war, can it?"

The concert featured performances of several songs from the band's 2001 album Know Your Enemy, some of which have not been performed since.

The bonus live tracks are taken from the same concert – out of sequence – and are presented in lower sound and video quality.

== Track listing ==
1. 'Found That Soul'
2. 'Motorcycle Emptiness'
3. 'Kevin Carter'
4. 'Ocean Spray'
5. 'If You Tolerate This Your Children Will Be Next'
6. 'Let Robeson Sing'
7. 'The Year of Purification'
8. 'Baby Elián'
9. 'Miss Europa Disco Dancer'
10. 'Wattsville Blues'
11. 'You Love Us'
12. 'Motown Junk'
13. 'Australia'
14. 'Rock and Roll Music'

== Bonus live tracks ==
1. 'So Why So Sad'
2. 'A Design for Life'
3. 'The Masses Against the Classes'
4. 'You Stole the Sun from My Heart'
5. 'Raindrops Keep Falling on My Head'
6. 'Freedom of Speech Won't Feed My Children'

== Extras ==
- Cuba documentary
- Tour diary
- Exclusive interviews
- Photo gallery
- Discography
- Hidden easter egg video clips

== Personnel ==
- James Dean Bradfield – guitar, vocals
- Nicky Wire – bass guitar
- Sean Moore – drums
- Nick Nasmyth – keyboards
- Yasek Manzano Silva – trumpet on "Kevin Carter" & "Ocean Spray"
