= There by the Grace of God =

2002 single by Manic Street Preachers

Single by Manic Street Preachers

from the album Forever Delayed
- Released: 14 October 2002
- Recorded: 2002
- Studio: Monnow Valley (Wales)
- Genre: Alternative rock, electronic
- Label: Epic
- Songwriter(s): Nick Jones; James Dean Bradfield; Sean Moore
- Producer(s): Mike Hedges, Greg Haver

Manic Street Preachers singles chronology
"Let Robeson Sing" (2001)	"There by the Grace of God" (2002)	"The Love of Richard Nixon" (2004)

"There by the Grace of God" is a song by Welsh alternative rock band Manic Street Preachers. It was released on 14 October 2002 by record label Epic as a single from the band's greatest hits album Forever Delayed.

== Content ==
The song is noted for the line "And all the drugs in the world can't save us from ourselves", which is an almost word-for-word quote from Marilyn Manson's song "Coma White", which features the line "And all the drugs in this world can't save her from herself". Manson was previously referred to in the song "The Convalescent" from 2001's Know Your Enemy, with the line "[...] and Brian Warner has a tasty little ass".

The CD single includes the B-sides "Automatik Teknicolour", "It's All Gone", "Unstoppable Salvation", "Happy Ending" and the music video for "There by the Grace of God". A DVD was also released, including the music video for the song and two remixes: Saint Etienne Mix and Starecase Mix.

== Release ==
Epic Records released "There by the Grace of God" on 14 October 2002. The song was featured in the band's greatest hits album Forever Delayed, released that year. The single reached number 6 in the UK Singles Chart. In Finland it peaked on number 9.

The single received a favourable review by the NME.

== Critical reception ==
In a positive review, Mark Beaumont of NME hailed the song's "icy disco beats and chiming spider-hair guitars" and compared it to Depeche Mode, saying "'...Grace of God' is basically 'Enjoy the Silence' with the tune hacked off, but as a half-arsed filler whacked off to flog a greatest hits it reveals not the irrelevant spent force of '...Tolerate This' but rejuvenated musical magpies willing to challenge themselves and their audience again." Drowned in Sound reviewer Steph saw the song as an attempt by the band to "go electronic," similarly comparing it to Depeche Mode and New Order. Though she felt the song lacked "some kind of clarity to cut through the cloying wall of sound," she praised the melody, "glorious wash of sweeping guitars and harsh yet soaring vocals."

Kevin Courtney of The Irish Times wrote that the song "towers above" much of the songs on the band's then-latest album Know Your Enemy (2001), whereas Sputnikmusic reviewer Iai felt it "just doesn't stand up to past glories." Jamie Atkins of Record Collector named the song a highlight of National Treasures – The Complete Singles (2011), calling it "deliciously gloomy and undersung." In a review of the same compilation, Sam Shepherd of Music OMH cited it among the band's best work, calling it "an under appreciated Manics classic."

== Track listing ==
All music written and composed by Nick Jones, James Dean Bradfield and Sean Moore.

CD single 1

1. "There by the Grace of God" – 3:48
2. "Automatik Teknicolour" – 3:37
3. "It's All Gone" – 4:05
4. "There by the Grace of God" (video)

CD single 2

1. "There by the Grace of God"
2. "Unstoppable Salvation" – 2:54
3. "Happy Ending" – 3:29

DVD

1. "There by the Grace of God" (video)
2. "There by the Grace of God" (Saint Etienne mix) – 5:07
3. "There by the Grace of God" (Starecase mix) – 4:55
4. Multimedia

== Charts ==
Chart (2002)	Peak position
UK Singles Chart	6
The Official Finnish Charts	9
