= Pillgwenlly Library =

Former library in Newport, Wales

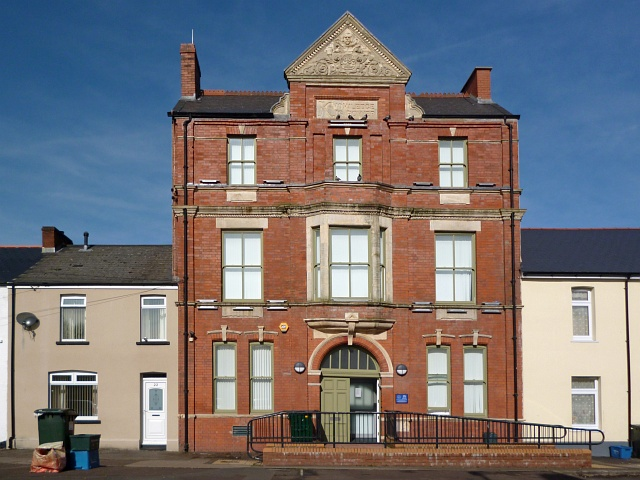
- "KNOWLEDGE IS POWER"

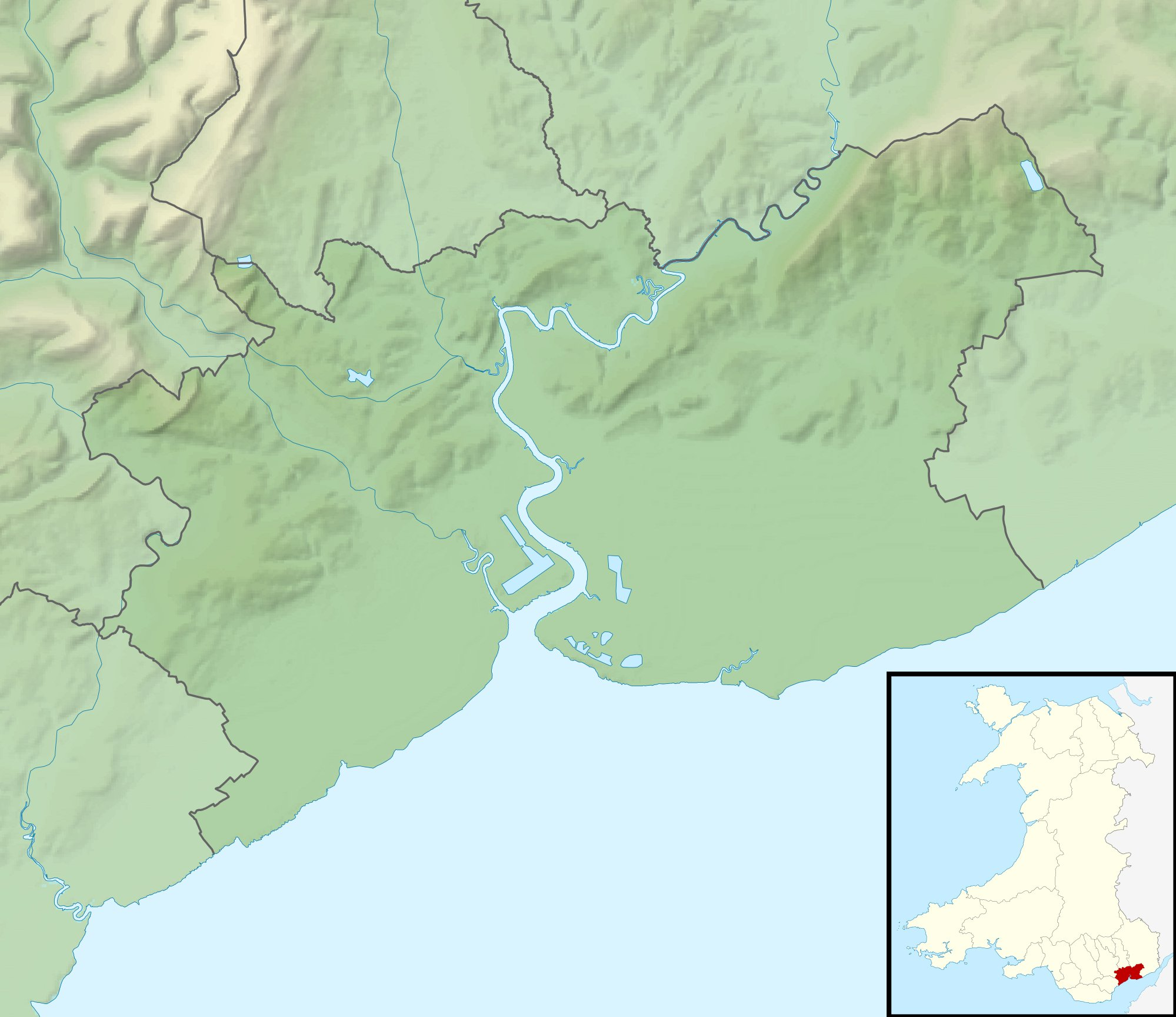
- Location within Newport
- 51.576616°N 2.989622°W
- Type: Library (former)
- Location: Pillgwenlly, Newport, Wales

History
- Built: 1889

Site notes
- Architect: Alfred Swash
- Architectural style: Vernacular

Pillgwenlly Library is a former library in Pillgwenlly, Newport, Wales. Built in 1889, it was designed by a local architect, Alfred Swash. The library was closed in the 21st century. An inscription on the building's tympanum (pediment) reads, "KNOWLEDGE IS POWER". The phrase, originally attributed to Francis Bacon, inspired the opening line of the song A Design for Life by the Manic Street Preachers.

== History and description ==
The Pillgwenlly Library was one of a number of projects established by the town's council to commemorate Queen Victoria's Golden Jubilee, held in 1887. An architectural competition attracted seven entries and a Mr Alfred Swash was declared the winner. Swash, a local architect, had trained with the firm of Habershon and Fawckner before establishing his own practice at Midland Bank Chambers in Newport. (Note: Alfred Swash (1860-1939) was born in Neath, practised for most of his professional life in Newport, latterly in partnership with his son, Frank, and retired to Llandrindod Wells.) The site for the library, on Temple Street, was donated by Lord Tredegar, the major local landowner, and the construction cost was £1,200. The building is frequently misidentified as a Carnegie library but funds did not come from the Carnegie Foundation. The necessary investment came through local taxation, which had been permitted by the passing of the Public Libraries Acts of 1850 and 1855. (Note: Although the Public Libraries Acts gave local authorities of a certain size the power to impose a penny rate for funding the provision of municipal libraries, many, particularly in less prosperous areas, did not do so. Queen Victoria's Golden Jubilee of 1887 provided a major stimulus, as at Newport.)

The library was of three storeys with a basement and the construction material was red brick with Bath stone dressings. Its frontage on Temple Street was 34 feet in length. The building incorporated a reading room, classrooms, a room for the playing of chess, and an office and accommodation for the permanent caretaker. The building's tympanum (pediment) carries an inscription, "KNOWLEDGE IS POWER". (Note: The phrase "Knowledge is power" is generally attributed to Francis Bacon, the Elizabethan philosopher.)

The library's inscription inspired Nicky Wire, lyricist for the Manic Street Preachers, to write their 1996 single, A Design for Life. The track's opening line is "Libraries gave us power". The band members grew up in Blackwood, a town in the South Wales Valleys to the north of Newport, and Wire's wife was employed at Pillgwenlly Library. In 2009 the Preachers were invited to unveil a plaque at the opening of the new central library in Cardiff; the plaque carries the lyric "Libraries gave us power".

The library closed in 2009, and the premises were repurposed as a community centre.

== Sources ==
- Brodie, Antonia (2001). Directory of British Architects, 1834–1914. Vol. 2 (L–Z). London: British Architectural Library. ISBN 978-0-826-45514-7.
- Greenwood, Thomas (1890). Public Libraries: A History of the Movement and a Manual for the Organization and Management of Rate Supported Libraries. OCLC 186931079.
- Prizeman, Oriel (2022). The Carnegie Libraries of Britain: A photographic chronicle. Cardiff: Welsh School of Architecture. ISBN 978-1-899-89545-8.
- Taylor, Simon; Whitfield, Matthew; Barson, Susie (2016). The English Public Library 1850-1939. Swindon: Historic England. ISBN 978-1-848-02454-0.
