= Let Robeson Sing =

2001 single by Manic Street Preachers

Single by Manic Street Preachers

from the album Know Your Enemy
- Released: 10 September 2001
- Recorded: 2000
- Genre: Alternative rock; folk rock
- Length: 3:46
- Label: Epic
- Songwriters: James Dean Bradfield; Sean Moore; Nicky Wire
- Producers: Dave Eringa; Mike Hedges

Manic Street Preachers singles chronology
"Ocean Spray" (2001)	"Let Robeson Sing" (2001)	"There by the Grace of God" (2002)

"Let Robeson Sing" is a song by Welsh alternative rock band Manic Street Preachers. It was released in September 2001 by record label Epic as the fourth and final single from their sixth studio album, Know Your Enemy. It reached number 19 in the UK Singles Chart.

== Content ==
The song is a tribute to the black American actor, singer and civil rights campaigner Paul Robeson. It shares its title with a book by Phil Cope and others, published jointly by the Paul Robeson Cymru Committee and the Bevan Foundation in 2001, with a reprint being published by the National Library of Wales in 2003. All three members of the band – James Dean Bradfield, Sean Moore and Nicky Wire – share the writing credits. "Let Robeson Sing" was the commercial billing used for one of the first remote concerts when Paul Robeson sang live from New York to an audience at the St. Pancras Town Hall in London, held on May 26, 1957 over a newly installed high quality transatlantic telephone cable despite the US government's restrictions on his freedom of movement.

The CD includes the B-sides "Masking Tape", "Didn't My Lord Deliver Daniel" – previously sung by Robeson – and the promotional video. The 12" vinyl edition contained "Fear of Motion" as well as two remixes of the title track, one by Ian Brown and the other by Felix Da Housecat.

== Release ==
"Let Robeson Sing" was released on 10 September 2001 by record label Epic as the fourth and final single from the band's sixth studio album, Know Your Enemy. The single reached number 19 in the UK charts on 22 September 2001, and was their lowest-charting single since "She Is Suffering" reached number 25 in 1994.

On 17 December 2011 "Let Robeson Sing" was the tenth of thirty-eight songs performed at the one-off A Night of National Treasures live performance at The O2 Arena (London). The lead vocals were performed by special guest Gruff Rhys of the Super Furry Animals, with James Dean Bradfield explaining to the audience that Rhys had been set to perform the song at the band's 2001 performance in Havana, Cuba, but circumstances had prevented this from happening.

== Video ==
The video was directed by Andrew Dosunmu and filmed at the Paul Robeson Theatre in Brooklyn.

== Track listing ==
All music written and composed by Nick Jones, James Dean Bradfield and Sean Moore.

CD single 1

1. "Let Robeson Sing" – 3:46
2. "Masking Tape" – 4:11
3. "Didn't My Lord Deliver Daniel" (Traditional) – 2:07
4. "Let Robeson Sing" (video)

CD single 2

1. "Let Robeson Sing" – 3:46
2. "Let Robeson Sing" (Ian Brown Mix) – 5:01
3. "Let Robeson Sing" (Thee Electroretro Club Mix By Felix Da Housecat) – 6:16
4. "Let Robeson Sing" (Live at Teatro Karl Marx, Havana, 17 February 2001)
5. "Let Robeson Sing" (Video from Cuba)

12" vinyl single
Side A

1. "Fear of Motion" – 2:46
2. "Let Robeson Sing" (Ian Brown Mix) – 5:01

Side B

1. "Let Robeson Sing" (Thee Glitz Mix By Felix Da Housecat) – 6:18

== Personnel ==
Manic Street Preachers

- James Dean Bradfield – lead vocals, lead and rhythm guitar
- Sean Moore – drums
- Nicky Wire – bass, backing vocals

Additional personnel

- Nick Nasmyth – keyboards, backing vocals
- Ian Brown – additional vocals on "Let Robeson Sing (Ian Brown Mix)"
- Aziz Ibrahim – additional guitar on "Let Robeson Sing (Ian Brown Mix)"
- Inder Goldfinger - additional percussion on "Let Robeson Sing (Ian Brown Mix)"
- Dan Bierton - additional keyboards & programming on "Let Robeson Sing (Ian Brown Mix)"

== Charts ==
Chart (2001)	Peak position
UK Singles Chart	19

UK chart performance

UK Top 40
Week	01
Position	19
