= Rosebud (song) =

Song by Manic Street Preachers

Single by Manic Street Preachers

from the album Know Your Enemy (2022 Remastered)
- Released: 22 July 2022
- Genre: Rock
- Length: 4:03
- Label: Columbia
- Songwriter(s): Nicky Wire; James Dean Bradfield; Sean Moore
- Producer(s): Dave Eringa

Manic Street Preachers singles chronology
"The Secret He Had Missed" (2021)	"Rosebud" (2022)	"Studies in Paralysis" (2022)

"Rosebud" is a song by Manic Street Preachers, originally planned for their 2001 album, Know Your Enemy, when it was supposed to be a double album. It was released on 22 July 2022, along with a remastered album and music video directed by Kieran Evans, which contains 1970s footage from the BBC archive.

== Critical reception ==
A Louder Than War review reads: "With its ringing guitars and electronic organ in the chorus, the song has a distinct Britpop flavour. Fittingly, the accompanying video induces nostalgia." An XS Noize critic wrote: "Beginning all wiry and cracked, 'Rosebud' soon opens out into a stuttering Hammond organ riff, a pensive rhythm track and a lyric that regrets 'most things I never finished'."

== Personnel ==
- James Dean Bradfield – lead vocals and guitar
- Nicky Wire – bass guitar
- Sean Moore – drums
