= Everything Must Go (song) =

1996 single by Manic Street Preachers

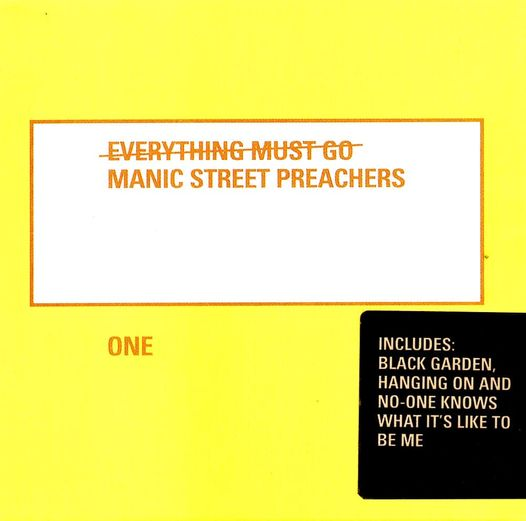

Single by Manic Street Preachers

from the album Everything Must Go
- Released: 22 July 1996
- Length: 3:41 (album version); 3:07 (edit)
- Label: Epic
- Songwriters: Nicky Wire; James Dean Bradfield; Sean Moore
- Producer: Mike Hedges

Manic Street Preachers singles chronology
| "A Design for Life" (1996) | "Everything Must Go" (1996) | "Kevin Carter" (1996) |

"Everything Must Go" is a song by Welsh alternative rock band Manic Street Preachers, released as the second single from their fourth studio album, Everything Must Go (1996), on 22 July 1996. The song reached number five on the UK Singles Chart.

== Background ==
The song is cited by Wire as a message to the fans, saying the music had changed after the loss of Richey Edwards, but the band is still the same. Ushering in a new era for the band, Wire's lyric asks fans to forgive them for changing: "and I just hope that you can forgive us, but everything must go".

James Dean Bradfield has said Sean Moore had a lot of freedom in the drums for his song. By contrast to several previous Manic Street Preachers singles, the drums are not "compressed", but are more open and free, giving a sense of disorder in the song. The song features a prominent string section that commentators such as Q magazine's Tom Doyle have compared to the songs of Phil Spector and his Wall of Sound.

== Release ==
"Everything Must Go" reached number five on the UK Singles Chart on 3 August 1996, making it the second of five consecutive UK top-ten singles. In Finland the song reached number 18. The CD release included "Black Garden", "Hanging On" and "No One Knows What It's Like to Be Me" whereas the cassette featured a live version of "Raindrops Keep Fallin' on My Head". An acoustic version of the song appears on the cassette single of "Kevin Carter". The Chemical Brothers' remix of the song appeared in the intro movie to the American and European versions of the PlayStation game Gran Turismo. The song also made an appearance on Forever Delayed, the band's greatest-hits album released in November 2002.

== Track listings ==
All music was composed by James Dean Bradfield and Sean Moore except where indicated. All lyrics were written by Nicky Wire except where indicated.

UK CD1 and Japanese CD single

1. "Everything Must Go" – 3:43
2. "Black Garden" – 4:28
3. "Hanging On" – 3:07
4. "No-One Knows What It's Like to Be Me" – 3:04

UK CD2

1. "Everything Must Go" – 3:43
2. "Everything Must Go" (The Chemical Brothers remix) – 6:33
3. "Everything Must Go" (Stealth Sonic Orchestra remix) – 3:45
4. "Everything Must Go" (Stealth Sonic Orchestra Soundtrack) – 3:28

UK cassette single

1. "Everything Must Go" (special version) – 3:40
2. "Raindrops Keep Fallin' on My Head" (live acoustic version) (Burt Bacharach, Hal David) – 2:09

Australian CD single

1. "Everything Must Go" – 3:43
2. "Black Garden" – 4:28
3. "Hanging On" – 3:07
4. "No-One Knows What It's Like to Be Me" – 3:04
5. "Everything Must Go" (Stealth Sonic Orchestra remix) – 3:45

== Charts ==
| Chart (1996) | Peak position |
|---|---|
| Europe (Eurochart Hot 100) | 29 |
| Finland (Suomen virallinen lista) | 18 |
| Israel (IBA) | 12 |
| Scottish Singles Sales (Official Charts) | 5 |
| UK Singles (Official Charts) | 5 |

== Release history ==
| Region | Date | Format(s) | Label(s) | Ref. |
|---|---|---|---|---|
| United Kingdom | 22 July 1996 | CD; cassette | Epic | |
| Japan | 31 July 1996 | CD | Epic | |

== Bibliography ==
- Price, Simon (1998). Everything (A Book About Manic Street Preachers). London: Virgin Books. ISBN 0-7535-0139-2.
