= Ocean Spray (Manic Street Preachers song) =

2001 single by Manic Street Preachers

Single by Manic Street Preachers

from the album Know Your Enemy
- B-side: "Groundhog Days"; "Just a Kid"; "Little Trolls"
- Released: 4 June 2001
- Length: 4:11
- Label: Epic
- Songwriters: James Dean Bradfield; Nicky Wire; Sean Moore
- Producer: Dave Eringa

Manic Street Preachers singles chronology
"Found That Soul" (2001)	"Ocean Spray" (2001)	"Let Robeson Sing" (2001)

"Ocean Spray" is a song by Welsh rock band Manic Street Preachers, released as the third single from their sixth studio album, Know Your Enemy (2001), on 4 June 2001. James Dean Bradfield wrote both lyrics and music for the song. It reached number 15 on the UK Singles Chart.

== Background ==
The song's title was inspired by the cranberry juice drink that James would take in to his mother Sue whilst she was in hospital undergoing treatment for cancer, eventually dying from the disease. It also featured the first recorded lyric written by James. Drummer Sean Moore played a trumpet solo on the song. The CD included "Groundhog Days", "Just A Kid", and the "Ocean Spray" video, whereas the cassette included "Little Trolls".

The "Ocean Spray" video clip also represents a high point in the visibility of the Manics photographer Mitch Ikeda, who appears and speaks the opening Japanese dialogue "Me, tottemo utsukushīdesu ne. Totemo utsukushī-me o shitemasu" (Japanese: 目、とっても美しいですね。とても美しい目をしてます), which translates as "you have very beautiful eyes... such beautiful eyes".

== Release ==
The song reached number 15 on the UK Singles Chart on 16 June 2001 and spent eight weeks in the top 100. A performance was recorded for that week's Top of the Pops.

== Track listings ==
All music was written and composed by Nick Jones, James Dean Bradfield and Sean Moore except "Ocean Spray", with music and lyrics by James Dean Bradfield.

UK CD1

1. "Ocean Spray" – 4:11
2. "Groundhog Days" – 3:50
3. "Just a Kid" – 3:30
4. "Ocean Spray" (video)

UK CD2

1. "Ocean Spray" – 4:11
2. "Ocean Spray" (live from Karl Marx Theatre, Havana, Cuba) – 4:06
3. "Ocean Spray" (Medicine remix) – 6:33
4. "Ocean Spray" (Kinobe remix) – 4:16
5. "Ocean Spray" (video—live from Karl Marx Theatre, Havana, Cuba) – 4:08

UK cassette single

1. "Ocean Spray" – 4:11
2. "Little Trolls" – 3:36
3. "Ocean Spray" (Ellis Island Sound remix) – 4:12

European CD1

1. "Ocean Spray" – 4:11
2. "Ballad of the Bangkok Novotel" – 2:37

European CD2

1. "Ocean Spray" – 4:11
2. "Ballad of the Bangkok Novotel" – 2:37
3. "Locust Valley" – 4:08
4. "Ocean Spray" (Kinobe remix) – 4:16

Australian CD single

1. "Ocean Spray" – 4:11
2. "Locust Valley" – 4:08
3. "Ballad of the Bangkok Novotel" – 2:37
4. "So Why So Sad" (acoustic) – 3:47

== Charts ==
Chart (2001)	Peak position
Europe (Eurochart Hot 100)	61
Scottish Singles Sales (Official Charts)	15
UK Singles (Official Charts)	15

== Release history ==
Region	Date	Format(s)	Label(s)	Ref.
United Kingdom	4 June 2001	CD; cassette	Epic	
Australia	9 July 2001	CD	Epic	
