= Kevin Carter (disambiguation) =

Kevin Carter (1960–1994) was a South African photojournalist.

Kevin Carter may also refer to:

- Kevin Carter (American football) (born 1973), American National Football League player
- "Kevin Carter" (song), a 1996 song by the British band Manic Street Preachers about the photojournalist
