= Australia (Manic Street Preachers song) =

1996 single by Manic Street Preachers

Single by Manic Street Preachers

from the album Everything Must Go
- B-side: "Velocity Girl"; "Take the Skinheads Bowling"; "Can't Take My Eyes Off You"
- Released: 2 December 1996
- Length: 4:05 (album version); 3:42 (edit)
- Label: Epic
- Songwriters: James Dean Bradfield; Sean Moore; Nicky Wire
- Producer: Mike Hedges

Manic Street Preachers singles chronology
"Kevin Carter" (1996)	"Australia" (1996)	"If You Tolerate This Your Children Will Be Next" (1998)

"Australia" is a song by Welsh alternative rock band Manic Street Preachers, released on 2 December 1996 through Epic Records as the fourth and final single from the fourth studio album, Everything Must Go (1996). The song peaked at number seven on the UK Singles Chart and was the fourth consecutive top-10 hit for the band.

== Background ==
The sentiment of the song is that Australia is just about the furthest one can go to get away from their home in Wales and is a metaphor for Nicky Wire's desire to escape from the emotional turmoil caused by the disappearance of his close friend and co-lyricist, Richey Edwards.

The music helps the lyrics convey the sense of freedom, featuring heavy guitar sound coupled with a raw emotion, and a crescendo bolstered by Sean Moore's drumming.

== Release ==
On 14 December 1996, "Australia" reached number seven on the UK Singles Chart, giving Manic Street Preachers their fourth consecutive top-10 hit, and charted for nine weeks. With this, all singles from Everything Must Go charted within the top 10 in the UK. It also made an appearance on Forever Delayed, the band's greatest hits album, released in November 2002.

The first CD included "Velocity Girl", "Take the Skinheads Bowling" and "Can't Take My Eyes Off You" (all three being cover versions of songs originally performed by Primal Scream, Camper Van Beethoven and Frankie Valli, respectively) and the cassette featured a live recording of "A Design for Life". All 3 of the CD cover versions would later feature on the Lipstick Traces compilation album in 2003 (although "Take the Skinheads Bowling" was re-recorded). The lack of original Manics material for the single's extra tracks was attributed to Nicky Wire having a case of writer's block as he approached writing material for the band's next album. He attributed this to the fact that it was the first time he had written a whole album without Richey's help.

== Legacy ==
In October 2011, NME placed "Australia" at number 150 on its list of "the 150 Best Tracks of the Past 15 Years". The song was the theme tune to the Nickelodeon UK sitcom Renford Rejects and has also been used in adverts for the Australian Tourist Commission.

== Track listings ==
All music was written by James Dean Bradfield and Sean Moore except where indicated. All lyrics were written by Nicky Wire except where indicated.

UK CD1 and Australian CD single
No.	Title	Writer(s)	Length
1.	"Australia" (radio edit)		3:41
2.	"Velocity Girl" (originally by Primal Scream)	James Beattie, Robert Gillespie	1:41
3.	"Take the Skinheads Bowling" (originally by Camper Van Beethoven)	Chris Molla, David Lowery, Greg Lisher, Victor Krummenacher	2:32
4.	"Can't Take My Eyes Off You" (originally by Frankie Valli)	Bob Crewe, Robert Gaudio	3:12

UK CD2
No.	Title	Writer(s)	Length
1.	"Australia" (radio edit)		3:41
2.	"Australia" (Lionrock remix)		5:57
3.	"Motorcycle Emptiness" (Stealth Sonic Orchestra remix)	Bradfield, Moore (music); Richey James, Wire (lyrics)	6:15
4.	"Motorcycle Emptiness" (Stealth Sonic Orchestra soundtrack)	Bradfield, Moore (music); James, Wire (lyrics)	6:20

UK cassette single
No.	Title	Length
1.	"Australia" (radio edit)
2.	"A Design for Life" (live)

== Charts ==
Chart (1996)	Peak position
Europe (Eurochart Hot 100)	26
Scottish Singles Sales (Official Charts)	5
UK Singles (Official Charts)	7
