= Intimism =

Intimism may refer to:

- Intimism (album), 2023 album by Nicky Wire
- Intimism (art movement), an artistic movement in the late 19th century and early 20th century
- Intimism (poetic movement), a poetic movement that emerged in Slovenia after the end of World War II
