= Found That Soul =

2001 single by Manic Street Preachers

Single by Manic Street Preachers

from the album Know Your Enemy
- Released: 26 February 2001
- Length: 3:05
- Label: Epic
- Songwriters: James Dean Bradfield; Sean Moore; Nicky Wire
- Producer: Dave Eringa

Manic Street Preachers singles chronology
"So Why So Sad" (2001)	"Found That Soul" (2001)	"Ocean Spray" (2001)

"Found That Soul" is a song by Welsh rock band Manic Street Preachers, released on 26 February 2001 from their sixth studio album, Know Your Enemy (2001). Writing credit was shared by all three members of the band: James Dean Bradfield, Sean Moore and Nicky Wire. The song reached number nine on the UK Singles Chart.

== Release ==
Released on the same day as "So Why So Sad", this was the first release by the Manics since the number-one hit "The Masses Against the Classes" 13 months earlier. It peaked at number nine on the UK Singles Chart on 4 March 2001, during the same week that "So Why So Sad" reached number eight. Despite entering the top 10, it was not included on the band's greatest hits album, Forever Delayed, making it the band's only top-10 single at the time of the compilation's release not to appear.

The CD includes versions of "Locust Valley" and "Ballad of the Bangkok Novotel", whereas the 7-inch includes a live version of "The Masses Against the Classes". "Ballad of the Bangkok Novotel" is entirely sung by Nicky Wire. In Benjamin Millar's review of Know Your Enemy for The Blurb, he described "Found That Soul" which "gets us off to a manic and electric start, a sonic attack that makes a huge noise for a three-piece."

== Track listings ==
All tracks were written and composed by Nick Jones, James Dean Bradfield and Sean Moore.

UK CD single

1. "Found That Soul" – 3:05
2. "Locust Valley" – 4:09
3. "Ballad of the Bangkok Novotel" – 2:36

Australian CD single

1. "Found That Soul" – 3:05
2. "So Why So Sad" – 3:55
3. "Locust Valley" – 4:09
4. "Ballad of the Bangkok Novotel" – 2:36

UK 7-inch single

1. "Found That Soul" – 3:05
2. "The Masses Against the Classes" (live at Millennium Stadium, 31 December 1999) – 3:00

== Charts ==
Chart (2001)	Peak position
Europe (Eurochart Hot 100)	37
Scottish Singles Sales (Official Charts)	9
UK Singles (Official Charts)	9

== Release history ==
Region	Date	Format(s)	Label(s)	Ref.
United Kingdom	26 February 2001	7-inch vinyl; CD	Epic	
United States	5 June 2001	Alternative radio	Virgin	
