= Pillgwenlly =

Community area in Newport, Wales

Pillgwenlly: Welsh: Pilgwenlli
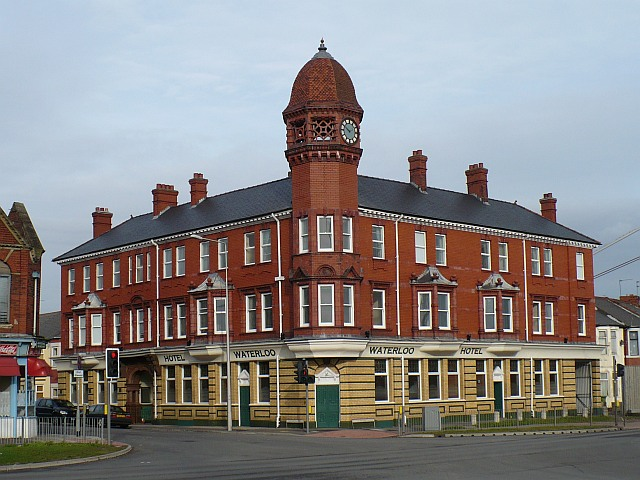
- The Waterloo Hotel

- Location within Newport
- Population: 8,116 (2011 census)
- OS grid reference: ST315875
- Principal area: Newport
- Country: Wales
- Sovereign state: United Kingdom
- Post town: NEWPORT
- Postcode district: NP20 2
- Dialling code: 01633; Savoy exchange
- Police: Gwent
- Fire: South Wales
- Ambulance: Welsh
- UK Parliament: Newport East
- Senedd Cymru – Welsh Parliament: Newport West
- List of places UK Wales Newport 51.58°N 2.99°W Map of the community

Pillgwenlly (Welsh: Pilgwenlli), usually referred to as Pill, is a community and electoral ward in the city of Newport, South Wales. It is the centre of the historic docks industry in south east Wales and contains a number of landmarks that remain from that era. Today it is one of the most diverse wards in Wales, and has seen significant migration dating back to the 19th century.

== Etymology ==
The name is an elision of "Pîl Gwynllyw" (or "Gwynllyw's Pîl" in English). 'Pîl' is a localised topographical element (found across the coast of South Wales, from Pembrokeshire and into Somerset) indicating a tidal inlet from the sea, suitable as a harbour. In local tradition, it is said that this name derives from the early part of Gwynllyw's life when he was an active pirate. The tradition states that Gwynllyw maintained his ships at Pillgwenlly. Gwynllyw's reputation amongst sailors saw him adopted as the patron saint of choice for Welsh pirates and smugglers including Sir Henry Morgan.

== Geography ==
The community is bounded by the River Usk to the east and southeast, the Ebbw River to the southwest, the Great Western Main Line to the west and Cardiff Road (A48) to the north.

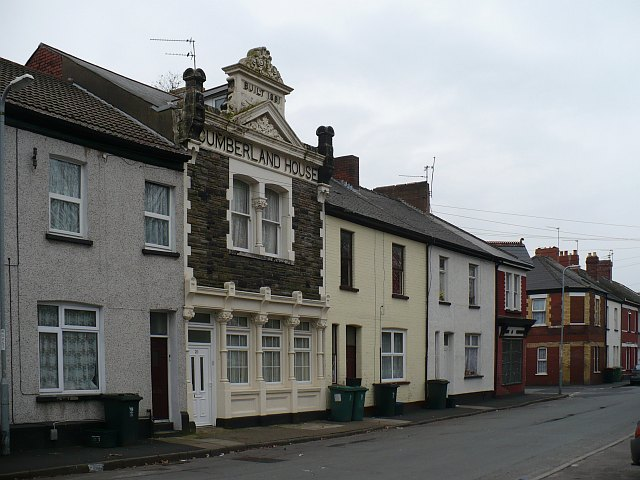
Courtybella Terrace, a typical Pill mixture of small terraces and exuberantly decorated Victorian commercial properties

It is an inner-city district to the south of the city centre and the built-up area is commonly shortened to "Pill". It contains the Newport Docks and the western ends of the Newport Transporter Bridge, City Bridge and George Street Bridge.

== History ==
The town of Newport developed around its Norman motte, and the castle which replaced it in the Middle Ages around the 14th century. However evidence exists of early use of the area around Pillgwenlly by boats, albeit with no other development identified.

By the late 18th century, the Monmouthshire Canal Act brought extension of the canal from the town to the southern mouth of the Usk. This brought commercial interest, with the founding of wharves in the early 19th century but with little residential development.

The Town Dock was opened in 1842, marking a major development in Newport's commercial potential. Newport grew as a port thanks to the significant mineral exports of the five valleys, shipping significant volumes of coal. The area was soon limited by its capacity and the Town Dock was extended in 1858 providing significantly greater commercial opportunities. One building remains of the Town Dock, the Baltic Oil Works.

In 1844, Newport Cattle Market opened on Commercial Street. This formed one of the first major trading sites in the town, serving as a place for farmers to trade cattle and sheep. The site is located on the present day location of an Asda supermarket. The Cattle Market closed in March 2009 after 165 years of operation but remains and is Grade II listed.

The area became a hub for visiting sailors, with the development of seamen's lodgings welcoming visitors from across the world. From this site, early communities developed of ethnic minority groups, including what was then a large community of Somali emigrants.

In the early 19th century, Pillgwenlly saw large-scale emigration of workers seeking work in its thriving docks. This particularly saw the arrival of Irish emigrants to the town. The Irish Club (also known as The Picton and Irish Club) on Commercial Road was a major centre for the emigrant community run by its landlady Sheila Gill.

In the 1960s and 1970s, the suburb saw widespread slum clearances, with large areas previously occupied by roads such as Lewis Street replaced with post-war council housing, which remains today.

== Culture ==
Pill hosts the annual Pill Carnival, on the last weekend of August. The Old Town Dock area is currently undergoing a huge mixed-use regeneration to bring the derelict dock lands back into use. A lively market takes place on a Saturday morning at the Newport Auctions site.

=== Architecture ===
Pillgwenlly retains significant examples of 19th and 20th century architecture, predominantly centred around buildings that served the shipping trade as well as housing for workers and buildings for traders. The area has two conservation areas, Lower Dock Street and the Cattle Market.

The skyline of Pillgwenlly is dominated by the Newport Transporter Bridge built in 1906 to facilitate trade on the River Usk and access between Pill and the east side of the river.

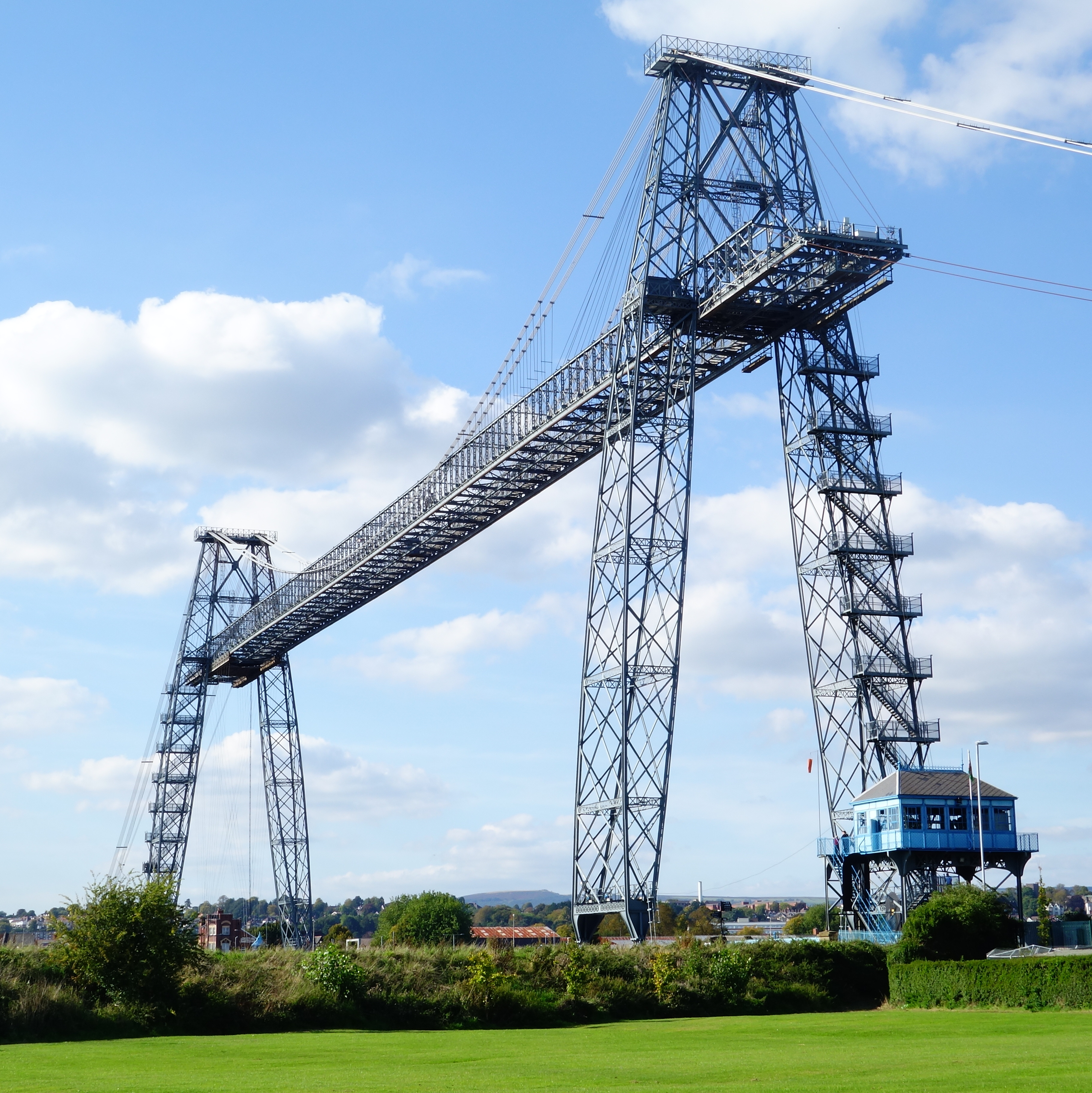
The Newport Transporter Bridge, opened in 1906

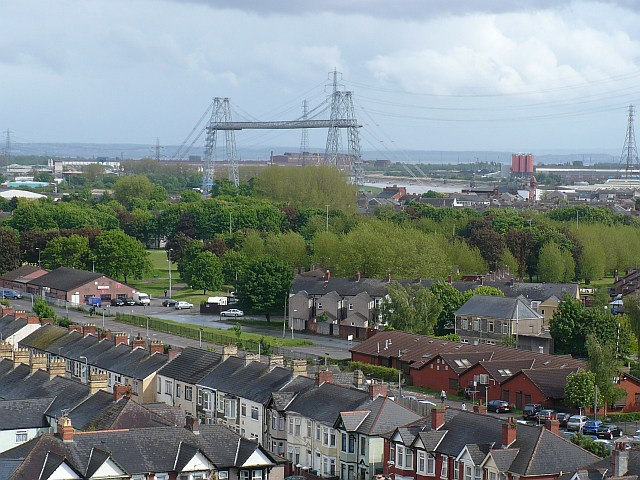
View over Pill, from the Royal Gwent Hospital

The Waterloo Hotel is a Grade II listed building and is a good example of an early-20th-century public house, with a surviving interior of exceptional quality. The corner of the building has a cantilevered octagonal clock tower rising to four stories in height with a pierced terracotta strapwork chamber to the top storey. The whole is set beneath a roof clad in fishscale clay tiling. The clock faces south to the docks.

The catholic church of St Michael is another Grade II listed building. Its foundation stone was laid in September 1886 and construction was completed in October 1887. As well as being a good example of a late 19th century catholic church it is notable for its high quality stained glass and strong character.

=== In the media ===
The lyrics of the Manic Street Preachers hit song A Design for Life were inspired by the inscriptions on the former premises of Pillgwenlly Library. The building inscription refers to a quote by philosopher Sir Francis Bacon, Knowledge is Power. The building, located on Temple Street, is now a community hub named Pillgwenlly Community First. Pillgwenlly Library re-opened in January 2009 on Commercial Road, but closed in 2024.

In 2012 the TV drama series Being Human featured internal and external cafe scenes filmed in Fanny's Cafe on Alexandra Road near the Transporter Bridge.

In 2024 S4C released its crime drama series Ar Y Ffin, which featured sites in Pillgwenlly such as Newport Docks, the Ship and Pilot Inn, and the Transporter Bridge. The series was released internationally as Mudtown.

== Governance ==
The area is governed by the Newport City Council. Pillgwenlly is the name of an electoral ward to the city council, represented by two city councillors since 1995. The ward has consistently elected Labour Party councillors.

In 2013 Pillgwenlly elected Wales' first Somali councillor, Omar Ali, who grew up on Ruperra Street. He was an advisor to Communities First and Displaced People in Action. At the time he was only one of four ethnic minority councillors.

As of the 2022 Welsh local elections Pillgwenlly is represented by Councillors Saeed Adan and Debbie Jenkins, both of the Welsh Labour Party.

== Education ==
Pillgwenlly Primary School is located on Mendaglief Road, at the site of the Royal Victoria Court housing development (formerly Whiteheads Steelworks), where it opened in April 2025.

Pillgwenlly has a Welsh medium school, Ysgol Gymraeg Nant Gwenlli, which was temporarily located in Caerleon until it moved to its permanent site at the old Pill Primary School building on Capel Crescent in spring 2025. The school has 420 primary school places, 10 additional learning needs places, and 48 half-day nursery places.

Pillgwenlly is part of the English medium secondary school catchment area for John Frost School. For Welsh medium secondary education the area is served by Ysgol Gyfun Gwent Is Coed.

== Healthcare ==
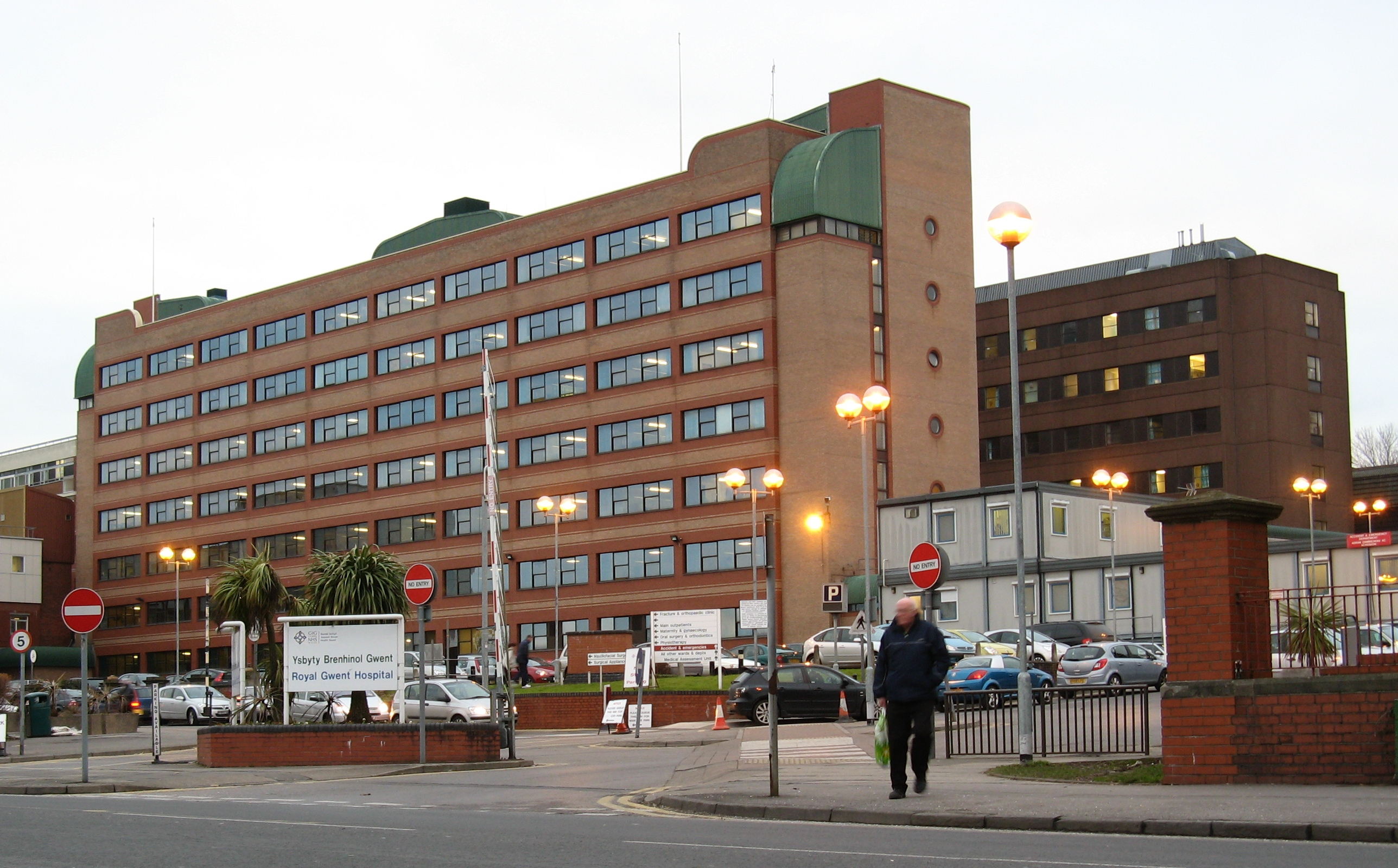
Royal Gwent Hospital, Cardiff Road

Pillgwenlly borders the site of the Royal Gwent Hospital, a major medical facility in the Aneurin Bevan University Health Board area and previously the sole accident and emergency centre in Newport, until the opening of the Grange Hospital in Llanfrechfa.

== Transport ==
Newport Bus operate the following routes in the area. The main routes servicing Pillgwenlly are buses 40 and 41 which run between Newport and Pill along Commercial Road and Mendalgief Road. However Cardiff Road is the route of a number of other local and inter city buses:

- Service 7 operates along George Street from Newport bus station over the George Street Bridge to Maindee.
- Service 31C operates between Newport and Peterstone Wentlooge
- Service 32 operates between Newport and Level of Mendalgief
- Services 33, and 40 operate between the Duffryn on a circular route.
- Service 30 and X30 operate between Newport and Cardiff Central bus station.
- Service X74 operates down Usk Way and the Southern Distributor Road to Newport Retail Park and Lliswerry.
- Stagecoach service 50A operates between Newport and Caerphilly.
- Stagecoach service X15 operates between Newport and Brynmawr.

The area benefits from extensive walking and cycling infrastructure, including the segregated National Cycle Route 4 which goes from the Southern Distributor Road bridge along Usk Way and Docks Way towards Maesglas. The area also includes NCN Route 47 towards the city centre along the River Usk. In 2025 the Welsh Government announced further funding for improvements to paths in Pill Park, the Millennium Centre, and Jeddo Close, to facilitate active travel to the local Pill Primary School and community centre.

== Sporting history ==
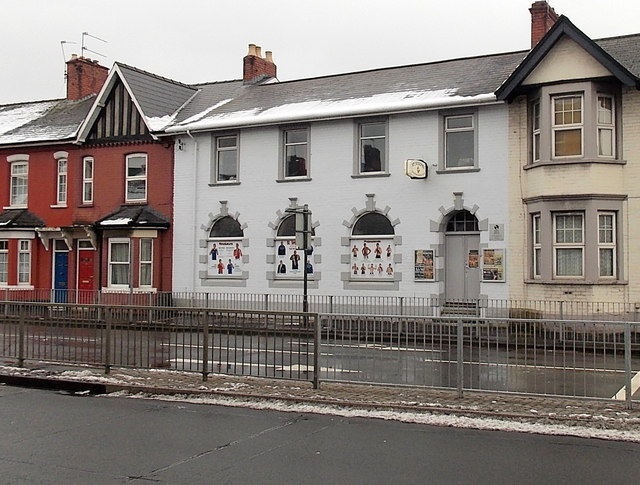
St Josephs Amateur Boxing Club, George Street

Pill Harriers RFC is a successful rugby union team affiliated to the Welsh Rugby Union, whose membership was historically made up from the local dock workers. In its past it supplied many players to both Newport RFC and the Wales national rugby union team.

Pillgwenlly is famous for its boxing history, as the site of St Joseph's Boxing Gym. The Pearce brothers, six of whom were professional boxers, hailed from Pill, including David 'Bomber' Pearce, Walter 'Bimbo' Pearce and Gary Pearce. Boxing coach Tony Borg is part of St Joseph's and has trained major names such as Lee Selby, Gary Buckland and Fred Evans at the gym.

The area has produced a number of footballers, often connected to the city's main club Newport County A.F.C. The football manager Tony Pulis was born in Pill and grew up on Dolphin Street. Former Newport County player and manager Mike Flynn grew up on Baldwin Street in the area.

== Demographics ==
=== Census ===
==== Population and age ====
In the 2021 Census there were 8,116 reported residents, an increase of 798 on the previous 2011 Census. The area saw a growth rate of 9.83%, significantly higher than the 1.4% growth rate seen across Wales. Pillgwenlly is one of the youngest places in Wales and in Newport, with a larger population under 16 years of age than average.

==== Ethnicity ====
50% of the population of Pillgwenlly are from an ethnic minority as of the 2021 Census, an increase of 5.2% compared to the 2011 Census. This was 35.5% higher than the Newport average and 43.8% higher than the Welsh average, leading to broad descriptions of Pillgwenlly as having "the most diverse and cultured high street in Wales".

==== Country of birth ====
33.4% of the population reported having a country of birth outside of the United Kingdom. This was 21.2% higher than the Newport average and 26.5% higher than the Welsh average. 76.3% of the population reported having a British, English, Welsh or other UK identity, which was 15% lower than the Newport average and 18.4% higher than the Welsh average.

==== Religion ====
The most common religion was Christianity (34.3%), followed by Islam (33.3%) and no religion (25.2%). The average share of people reporting no religion in Newport is 43% and 46.5% across Wales, making Pillgwenlly one of the most religious places in Wales (21.3% above average).

==== Language ====
More than 30 languages are spoken in Pillgwenlly. 15% of the population reported having no adults in the household with English as their main language, 11.5% higher than the Newport average and 12.7% higher than the Welsh average. A mural on Temple Street in Pill depicts flags of nationalities represented in the area as well as languages spoken, created by local artist Andy O'Rourke. It is labelled 'United Cultures of Pillgwenlly'.

==== Life expectancy ====
In 2016, women in the Pillgwenlly ward had the fifth-lowest life expectancy at birth of any ward in England and Wales at 74.4 years. For men the life expectancy was 70 years.

==== Poverty ====
Pillgwenlly was one of the top 5% most deprived wards in Wales as measured by the Welsh Index of Multiple Deprivation.

As of 2020, 37% of children in Pillgwenlly live in poverty, 14% higher than the Welsh average. 37% have no qualifications, 17.6% higher than the Welsh average, and only 26% of working age residents are in full-time employment, 10% below the Welsh average. Disability rates are higher, with 28.5% of people having a long-term illness, 5.8% above the Welsh average.

== Economy ==
=== Regeneration ===
In the 1960s and 1970s Pillgwenlly, like much of Newport, saw slum clearances and mass construction of council housing. In the 2010s it received extensive Big Lottery funding for regeneration and community facilities. This led to the opening of the Pillgwenlly Millenium Centre (known as Pill Mill) which today hosts local community groups, charities, and cultural events. In May 2023 Newport City Council launched a "masterplan" for regeneration of the area, including a new community facility on Commercial Road, a heritage and education site at the former Cattle Market, and other proposed but unfunded ideas.

== Social issues ==
In July 2015, Gwent Police proposed a plan to develop a designated area for prostitution within the boundaries of Pill. The proposal follows a similar pilot scheme in the North of England, and a police spokeswoman said enforcement alone was "not an effective solution". Officers stated that no decision would be made until they had looked at evidence from other initiatives and consulted with residents, businesses and the council. Officers commented that similar schemes had increased the reporting of offences against prostitutes, and allowed other agencies to work with women to help them leave the sex industry. Monmouth MP David Davies, who had debated prostitution on the Council of Europe, was cautious about the proposed area, and said that it "should not become like Amsterdam."

In 2022 the area trialled pod accommodation for homeless people on Lower Dock Street, which was opposed by local Labour councillor Saeed Adan and local residents over concerns around sex work and drug use, but the project was extended to continue until 2025.
