= Take the Skinheads Bowling =

Song by Camper Van Beethoven

Song by Camper Van Beethoven

from the album Telephone Free Landslide Victory
- Released: 1985
- Recorded: January–February 1985
- Studio: Sámurai Sound, Davis, California
- Genre: Jangle pop
- Length: 2:32
- Label: I.R.S./Cooking Vinyl
- Songwriter: David Lowery
- Producer: Camper Van Beethoven

"Take the Skinheads Bowling" is a song by the American alternative rock band Camper Van Beethoven, written by the band's frontman David Lowery and released on their album Telephone Free Landslide Victory (1985).

== Background ==
Although never released as a single or appearing on any radio charts, the song's "incredibly catchy singalong chorus" led it to become their signature song. "Take the Skinheads Bowling" received substantial airplay on KROQ and BBC Radio 2 as well as on The Dr. Demento Show.

Lowery admits to being surprised by the success of "Take the Skinheads Bowling", stating on his blog:

We regarded Take The Skinheads Bowling as just a weird non-sensical [sic] song. The lyrics were purposely structured so that it would be devoid of meaning. Each subsequent line would undermine any sort of meaning established by the last line. It was the early 80′s and all our peers were writing songs that were full of meaning. It was our way of rebelling. BTW this is the most important fact about this song. We wanted the words to lack any coherent meaning. There is no story or deeper insight that I can give you about this song. Lassie and Where the Hell is Bill were silly but there was at least a point to the songs. Plus both songs were pretty jokey. Something that seemed popular at the time.

— David Lowery, #74 Hits are Black Swans-Take the Skinheads Bowling, David Lowery - 300 Songs Blog

== Interpretation ==
The lyrics of the song mainly discuss the titular action of "[taking] the skinheads bowling", but there are also some humorous lines relating to bowling alleys ("Some people say that bowling alleys got big lanes"), the song itself ("There's not a line that goes here that rhymes with anything") or surrealistic asides ("I had a dream; I wanted to lick your knees")

== Covers ==
A version of the song performed by Teenage Fanclub was featured in the Michael Moore documentary Bowling for Columbine (2002).

The song was covered by Welsh rock band Manic Street Preachers as a B-side to their single "Australia" (1996) and subsequently included on their B-side compilation album Lipstick Traces (A Secret History of Manic Street Preachers).

The Norwegian pop band Astroburger covered the song on their debut album I used to be mod (1992).

The Australian indie rock band Custard did a cover on their album Respect All Lifeforms (2020).

== Take the Skinheads Bowling EP ==
=== Track listing ===
1. "Take the Skinheads Bowling"
2. "Cowboys From Hollywood"
3. "Epigram"
4. "Atkuda"
5. "Epigram"
6. "Colonel Enrique Adolfo Bermudez"

== Charts ==
Chart (1986)	Peak position
UK Indie Chart	8

== See also ==
- Telephone Free Landslide Victory (1985)
