= The Masses Against the Classes =

2000 single by Manic Street Preachers

Single by Manic Street Preachers
- B-side: "Close My Eyes"; "Rock and Roll Music"
- Released: 10 January 2000
- Studio: Rockfield (Wales); Rak (London)
- Genre: Alternative rock; hard rock; pop punk
- Length: 3:23
- Label: Epic
- Composers: James Dean Bradfield; Sean Moore
- Lyricist: Nicky Wire
- Producer: Dave Eringa

Manic Street Preachers singles chronology
| "Tsunami" (1999) | "The Masses Against the Classes" (2000) | "So Why So Sad" (2001) |

"The Masses Against the Classes" is a song by British rock band Manic Street Preachers, released as a limited-edition single in January 2000. It was a stand-alone single, not featured on any studio album, and was deleted (removed from wholesale supply) on the day of release. Despite being deleted on the day of release, the single peaked at the top of the UK Singles Chart.

== Background ==
The title of the song is derived from a quotation from the 19th-century Liberal Prime Minister William Ewart Gladstone ("All the world over, I will back the masses against the classes"). The single begins with a Noam Chomsky quotation and ends with the quote "The slave begins by demanding justice, and ends by wanting to wear a crown." from Albert Camus. The record sleeve features the Cuban flag albeit without the star, a mark of the band's socialist political ideology. The band later played in Havana, in February 2001, to a sold-out Karl Marx theatre with Fidel Castro in the audience, whom they met when he arrived just thirty minutes before they were due to play.

== Content ==
"The Masses Against the Classes" is considered a return to the alternative rock style of music produced by the band in the early to mid-1990s, while the lyrics reply to criticism of the This Is My Truth Tell Me Yours album, which had featured a softer, more pop-oriented sound. The song was debuted on the festival circuit late in mid-1999.

Martin Power proclaimed "The Masses Against the Classes" a "raucous, guitar-driven slice of pop-punk" that recalled Nirvana's 1991 song "On a Plain". On the style of the song, bassist Nicky Wire commented that an "Iggy and the Stooges vibe" had been sought.

== Release ==
The single sold 76,000 copies in its first week and reached number one on the UK Singles Chart on 16 January 2000, and spent 9 weeks on the chart.

The single also reached number seven in Ireland, while in Finland it was a big success, reaching number four and staying on the chart for 4 weeks. In Norway it peaked at number 12 and charted for 2 weeks, and it is the only Manic Street Preachers single to chart in France, where it reached number 157.

The single was released less than two weeks after the large concert at the Millennium Stadium in Cardiff on 31 December 1999, having been promoted that night; the only video for the single is from the live concert. The concert at the Millennium combined with "The Masses Against the Classes" reaching number one as well as the top 20 in three other countries, and the fact that This Is My Truth Tell Me Yours was a commercial and critical success, is frequently pointed as the peak in the Manic Street Preachers' career.

"The Masses Against the Classes" was released both as a CD single and numbered 10-inch vinyl; each version also featured the songs "Close My Eyes" and a cover of Chuck Berry's "Rock and Roll Music". Its first album appearance was on the greatest hits album Forever Delayed. A live version of the song has also appeared as a B-side on "Found That Soul".

A remastered version, which removed the Albert Camus quotation in the outro, was included on the 2022 reissue of the band's 2001 album Know Your Enemy.

== Track listing ==
All music was written by James Dean Bradfield and Sean Moore except where indicated. All lyrics were written by Nicky Wire except where indicated.

UK CD and 10-inch single

1. "The Masses Against the Classes" – 3:23
2. "Close My Eyes" – 4:27
3. "Rock and Roll Music" (music and lyrics: Chuck Berry) – 2:53

== Charts ==
=== Weekly charts ===
Weekly chart performance for "The Masses Against the Classes"
| Chart (2000) | Peak position |
|---|---|
| Europe (Eurochart Hot 100) | 6 |
| Finland (Suomen virallinen lista) | 4 |
| Ireland (IRMA) | 7 |
| Norway (VG-lista) | 12 |
| Scotland Singles (OCC) | 1 |
| UK Singles (OCC) | 1 |

| Chart (2013) | Peak position |
|---|---|
| France (SNEP) | 157 |

=== Year-end charts ===
Year-end chart performance for "The Masses Against the Classes"
| Chart (2000) | Position |
|---|---|
| UK Singles (OCC) | 110 |
