= I Killed the Zeitgeist =

Studio album by Nicky Wire
- Released: 25 September 2006
- Recorded: 2005
- Studio: Stir Studio, Cardiff, South Wales
- Genre: Alternative rock, indie rock
- Length: 41:57
- Label: Red Ink
- Producer: Greg Haver, Nicky Wire

Nicky Wire chronology
I Killed the Zeitgeist (2006)	Intimism (2023)

Singles from I Killed the Zeitgeist
- 1. "Break My Heart Slowly" Released: 18 September 2006

I Killed the Zeitgeist is the debut solo studio album by Manic Street Preachers bass guitarist and lyricist Nicky Wire. It was released on 25 September 2006 by record label Red Ink.

== Background ==
Many of the album's songs had previously appeared elsewhere in various formats. "I Killed the Zeitgeist" had been released on Christmas Day 2005 on Manic Street Preachers' official site as a free download, while "The Shining Path" was released exclusively on iTunes for download. In addition, a promotional album sampler had been sent out to the press and certain other people which included "I Killed the Zeitgeist", "Goodbye Suicide", "Sehnsucht" and "Everything Fades".

== Release ==
"Break My Heart Slowly" was released as a single on 18 September 2006.

I Killed the Zeitgeist was released on 25 September 2006 by record label Red Ink.

== Reception ==
Professional ratings
Review scores
Source	Rating
AllMusic	3.5/5 stars
The Guardian	3/5 stars

Stephen Thomas Erlewine of AllMusic described the album as "the sound of a slowly aging outsider who is reconnecting to his rebel roots. And that's what's really appealing about I Killed the Zeitgeist: it's rough and unfinished, but it's utterly alive, with its misfires as interesting as its successes, which, naturally, makes it not only a strong solo debut but some of Wire's most compelling music in years."

== Track listing ==
All tracks are written by Nicky Wire.

No.	Title	Length
1.	"I Killed the Zeitgeist"	2:32
2.	"Break My Heart Slowly"	3:36
3.	"Withdraw / Retreat"	2:47
4.	"Goodbye Suicide"	2:28
5.	"The Shining Path"	3:21
6.	"Bobby Untitled"	3:24
7.	"You Will Always Be My Home"	3:37
8.	"So Much for the Future"	2:15
9.	"Stab Yr Heart"	3:43
10.	"Kimino Rock"	2:42
11.	"Sehnsucht (Neu Song)"	1:57
12.	"(Nicky Wire's) Last"	2:57
13.	"Everything Fades"	6:27
14.	"Ocean Rain" (Echo & the Bunnymen cover; limited edition hidden bonus track)	3:59

B Sides: 1) Casual Glam 2) Derek Jarman's Garden 3) Afterbloom 4) Daydreamer Eyes

== Personnel ==
- Nicky Wire – lead vocals, backing vocals, electric guitar, acoustic guitar, production, album design concept, sleeve photography

Additional personnel

- James Dean Bradfield – guitar solos and backing vocals on "Withdraw Retreat" and "Kimono Rock"
- Nick Nasmyth – organ on "So Much for the Future"
- Greg Haver – drums, backing vocals, production

Technical personnel

- Ryan Art – album artwork
- Loz Williams – engineering
- Shawn Joseph – mastering
- Mitch Ikeda – sleeve photography
