= Kevin Carter (song) =

1996 song by Manic Street Preachers

Single by Manic Street Preachers

from the album Everything Must Go
- Released: 30 September 1996
- Length: 3:25 (edit)
- Label: Epic
- Composers: James Dean Bradfield, Nicky Wire, Sean Moore
- Lyricist: Richey Edwards
- Producer: Mike Hedges

Manic Street Preachers singles chronology
"Everything Must Go" (1996)	"Kevin Carter" (1996)	"Australia" (1996)

"Kevin Carter" is a song by Manic Street Preachers, released as the third single from their album Everything Must Go in 1996. The song peaked at number nine on the UK Singles Chart.

== Background and composition ==
The subject of the lyrics was the 1994 Pulitzer Prize-winning professional photographer Kevin Carter who was awarded for his image The Vulture and the Little Girl, taken in what is now South Sudan. Carter was troubled by the balance of his professional responsibilities with moral considerations, leading to his suicide by carbon monoxide poisoning at the age of 33.

Lead singer and guitarist James Dean Bradfield tuned his Fender Jazzmaster to open G tuning, which is commonly used in the playing of slide and bottleneck guitars. The jagged, descending chords of the verses lead into a lush extended middle section, including a trumpet solo played by Sean Moore, which further points to experimental songwriting while also linking back to the spiky music on the band's previous album, The Holy Bible. James Dean Bradfield has said of the song, "It's quite a scratchy sound, but it's kind of complicated in its own humble way."

Along with "Elvis Impersonator: Blackpool Pier", it was one of two new tracks that Bradfield played on an acoustic guitar to the songs' lyricist, Richey Edwards, shortly before he disappeared.

== Release ==
The song reached number nine on the UK Singles Chart on 12 October 1996, giving them a third straight top-ten hit, remaining in the charts for eight weeks. The song's lyrics were written solely by missing band-member Richey Edwards. The trumpet solo has been used as the theme music to the ITV Wales current affairs programme Wales This Week.

The CD includes "Horses Under Starlight", "Sepia" and "First Republic", while the cassette includes an acoustic version of "Everything Must Go".

The second of the three other tracks, "Sepia", is a reference to the final scene of the film, Butch Cassidy and the Sundance Kid, where the two main characters are shown in freeze frame, which then is colourised to sepia tone. The lyrics also appear to reflect some of Nicky Wire's raw emotion following the disappearance of his close friend and bandmate.

The Butch Cassidy connection is also referenced in their song "Australia" (which is where the characters from the film say they will go next, directly before the 'Sepia' sequence), and the decision to record "Raindrops Keep Fallin' on My Head" for the War Child charity compilation The Help Album. This track was replaced by a single release of the track "Further Away" in Japan.

== Track listings ==
All music was written by James Dean Bradfield, Sean Moore, and Nicky Wire except where indicated. All lyrics were written by Richey James except where indicated.

CD one

1. "Kevin Carter" – 3:28
2. "Horses Under Starlight" – 3:09 (Instrumental)
3. "Sepia" (music: Bradfield, Moore. lyrics: Wire) – 3:54
4. "First Republic" (music: Bradfield, Moore. lyrics: Wire) – 3:48

CD two

1. "Kevin Carter" – 3:26
2. "Kevin Carter" (Busts Loose) – 7:45 (Remixed by Jon Carter)
3. "Kevin Carter" (Stealth Sonic Orchestra Remix) – 6:40
4. "Kevin Carter" (Stealth Sonic Orchestra Soundtrack) – 6:37

Cassette

1. "Kevin Carter" – 3:26
2. "Everything Must Go" (acoustic version) (music: Bradfield, Moore. lyrics: Wire) – 3:22

== Charts ==
Chart (1996)	Peak position
Europe (Eurochart Hot 100)	44
Scottish Singles Sales (Official Charts)	8
UK Singles (Official Charts)	9

== Bibliography ==
- Price, Simon (1999). Everything (A Book About Manic Street Preachers). London: Virgin Books. ISBN 0-7535-0139-2.
- Heatley, Michael (1997). Manic Street Preachers in Their Own Words. London: Omnibus Press. ISBN 978-0711969063.
