= Know Your Enemy (Manic Street Preachers album) =

Studio album by Manic Street Preachers
- Released: 19 March 2001
- Recorded: August–December 2000
- Studios: El Cortijo, Andalusia, Spain; Monnow Valley, Rockfield, Wales; Rockfield, Rockfield, Wales; Abbey Road, London, England; Big Noise Recorders, Cardiff, Wales; AIR, London, England; RAK, London, England
- Genre: Alternative rock
- Length: 75:34
- Label: Epic
- Producers: Dave Eringa; David Holmes; Greg Haver; Mike Hedges

Manic Street Preachers chronology
This Is My Truth Tell Me Yours (1998)	Know Your Enemy (2001)	Forever Delayed (2002)

Singles from Know Your Enemy
- 1. "So Why So Sad" Released: 26 February 2001; 2. "Found That Soul" Released: 26 February 2001; 3. "Ocean Spray" Released: 4 June 2001; 4. "Let Robeson Sing" Released: 10 September 2001

Alternative cover
- Cover of the 2022 version

Know Your Enemy is the sixth studio album by Welsh alternative rock band Manic Street Preachers, released on 19 March 2001 by Epic Records. It was supported by four singles, all of which reached the top 20 of the UK singles chart.

The band originally envisioned Know Your Enemy as two separate albums with very different sounds and concepts, with the intention of releasing both on the same day. The record label vetoed the idea and a compromise was made, resulting in a single, lengthy, very diverse record. Whilst the album sold well, it did not match the success of its predecessor, This Is My Truth Tell Me Yours. Critics were somewhat divided in their opinions at first, but its reception since has been more positive.

In 2022, the band released remixed and expanded two- and three-disc editions of Know Your Enemy, rearranging the tracks into the two separate albums as originally intended.

== Background ==
Drummer Sean Moore stated in an interview with a Spanish reporter in 2014 that the songs included on Know Your Enemy were originally intended for two separate albums: Door to the River, which consisted of more reflective and personal material, and the heavier, more politically charged Solidarity, with the intention of releasing both on the same day. The record label was not inclined to put out two albums at the same time (they would feel the same in 2013–2014 with Rewind the Film and Futurology), so most of the material was released as one lengthy, highly varied, 75-minute album instead. Because of this, Moore felt that the finished album was "strange" and "confusing". The only remnant of the original two-album idea was that the first two singles, "So Why So Sad" and "Found That Soul" – reflecting the very different styles at play – were released on the same day as a publicity stunt.

The album departs from the arena rock of the band's previous two albums, featuring a rougher, less polished sound. It also displays influences from a much wider range of styles than before. On the album's diverse sound, Pitchfork Media stated: "Know Your Enemy finds the Manics attempting to write a protest song in just about every genre." They attributed the "riotous" punk sound of the tracks "Found That Soul", "Intravenous Agnostic", and "Dead Martyrs" to the influence of Sonic Youth and Joy Division and the jangle-pop of "The Year of Purification" and "Epicentre" to R.E.M. The tracks "So Why So Sad" and "Miss Europa Disco Dancer" were described as "a Beach Boys homage" and "a disco parody" respectively, while "My Guernica", "His Last Painting" and "The Convalescent" were described as "dark, marching and charging post-punk anthems".

The album features Nicky Wire's debut as a lead vocalist, on the track "Wattsville Blues", and James Dean Bradfield's debut as a lyricist, on "Ocean Spray". Kevin Shields of My Bloody Valentine guested on guitar on two tracks.

The left-wing political convictions of Manic Street Preachers are apparent in many of the album's songs. "Baby Elián" comments on the strained relations between the United States and Cuba as seen in the Elián González affair. The band also pays tribute to singer and civil rights activist Paul Robeson in the song "Let Robeson Sing".

About the political side of the record, Wire told The Scotsman, "Unfortunately it was four years before everyone else got interested in politics. It took everyone else a war. Where have these people been the last four years? Forty years? American foreign policy's never changed. There's a track called 'Freedom of Speech Won't Feed My Children' about forcing freedom on societies that says everything we ever needed to say." Wire also described the album as "a deeply flawed, highly enjoyable folly".

James Dean Bradfield reflected on the album in 2015, placing it as his second-least-favourite album that the band made. "When we came in to do this album we were reacting to the massive success in Europe and other parts of the world. Not America. But with Everything Must Go and This Is My Truth we had sold millions of records around the world, and after This Is My Truth we kind of reacted against our own success. We thought that we had lost some of that original punk spirit that we’d had. It had kind of always been in the lyrics and some of our performances, but we thought we’d become too polished. We thought that perhaps we had fallen onto a treadmill of success, which was stupid. You look back on all this stuff and think, 'What a fucking idiot I was!' You can't help but live in the moment, and basically with Know Your Enemy we tried to be too spontaneous and too organic. We were just laying stuff down quite quickly and not worrying about the production. And we undersold some of the songs on the record. It's not the producer's fault, it's our fault. We backed him into a corner and said, 'No, we want to keep things fresh and do it quickly.' And we didn't give the record a chance to breathe or sound good."

Nicky Wire reflected on the album in 2021: "Musically, I was particularly lazy and destructive. Constantly saying, 'It's too tight - can't we use the demo?' Too many lyrics just weren't finished. The original idea was to have two albums: one called Solidarity, after the Polish trade union movement, and one called Door to the River, which was the softer side. James just looked at me: 'Why are you trying to do this weird shit all the time?' In a nice way."

== Release ==
Know Your Enemy was released on 19 March 2001. The album debuted and peaked at number 2 in the UK Album Chart, spending a total of 17 weeks in the Top 100. In Ireland the album reached number 5. Around the world it was fairly successful, peaking at number 3 in Finland and remaining five weeks in the Finnish charts. It was number 6 in Denmark, number 7 in Sweden, and number 8 in Norway and in Greece. In Germany, Belgium and in Australia it charted within the top 20.

Four singles from the album were released. "So Why So Sad" and "Found That Soul" were released on the same day while "Ocean Spray" and "Let Robeson Sing" were released later. All four singles charted within the top 20 in the UK Singles Chart.

Know Your Enemy reached the top 10 in seven countries. It peaked at number 5 in the European charts. Since its release in March 2001, Know Your Enemy has sold more than 200,000 copies in the UK alone.

In 2021, Nicky Wire reflected on the album's reputation and sales: "To this day, you see Know Your Enemy at service stations for £2.99, because they bought so many thinking it was by one of those commercial bands! In retrospect, it sold half a million copies. Imagine what we'd give for that now."

== Reception ==
Professional ratings
Aggregate scores
Source	Rating
Metacritic	57/100
Review scores
Source	Rating
AllMusic	2.5/5 stars
Alternative Press	6/10
Robert Christgau	(2-star Honorable Mention)
Dotmusic	3.5/5 stars
Mojo	3.5/5 stars
NME	7/10
Pitchfork	7.5/10
PopMatters	unfavourable
Q	3/5 stars
Rolling Stone	unfavourable

Know Your Enemy received generally mixed reviews from critics. At Metacritic the album has a score of 57, which indicates "mixed or average reviews".

Stephen Thomas Erlewine of Allmusic said in a two-and-a-half-star review that "it was time to strike back with a harsh, political record" after the more "lush arena rock" of their previous albums Everything Must Go (1996) and This Is My Truth Tell Me Yours (1998). "The block-type cover art reveals that at a glance, and so does the ferocious opener, 'Found That Soul,' both suggesting their dark high watermark, The Holy Bible." He observed, "This is the album where the Manics tie all their disparate strands together, up the political ante, try new things, all in an attempt to prove they're still vital. When it works, this can be pretty invigorating, but when it doesn't, it's utterly maddening", concluding that the length and inconsistent quality damaged "a record that rocks harder, sounds better, than anything since Richey James disappeared -- but lacks the sense of craft that made Everything Must Go a minor masterpiece."

Robert Christgau gave the album a two-star honorable mention, calling it "punk propaganda poppified" and citing "Ocean Spray" and "Let Robeson Sing" as highlights.

Victoria Segal from the NME gave a positive review to the album and wrote: "Know Your Enemy sees them scrabbling for some of that early freedom, catapulting themselves back to a time when their minds could only just keep pace with their lipsticked mouths and they had all the establishment credentials of a red light district. It's a dangerous mission, returning to the scene of your earliest triumphs is a textbook example of the fool's errand."

Pitchfork Media described the album as "provocative, well-done, but not quite focused enough to take the listener anywhere in particular."

Mojo called the album "such a sprawling, unwieldy beast that the instrumental hooks take time to emerge".

A negative review came from Rolling Stone, which wrote: "Nowhere amidst all the confusion is there even a worthwhile tune to be salvaged", calling it "hideously dull".

== Track listing ==
All lyrics are written by Nicky Wire, except "Ocean Spray", by James Dean Bradfield; all music is composed by Bradfield and Sean Moore, except "We Are All Bourgeois Now", written by Tim Gane, Malcolm Eden, John Williamson and Gary Baker.

No.	Title	Length
1.	"Found That Soul"	3:05
2.	"Ocean Spray"	4:11
3.	"Intravenous Agnostic"	4:02
4.	"So Why So Sad"	4:02
5.	"Let Robeson Sing"	3:46
6.	"The Year of Purification"	3:39
7.	"Wattsville Blues"	4:29
8.	"Miss Europa Disco Dancer"	3:52
9.	"Dead Martyrs"	3:23
10.	"His Last Painting"	3:16
11.	"My Guernica"	4:56
12.	"The Convalescent"	5:54
13.	"Royal Correspondent"	3:31
14.	"Epicentre" (contains excerpt of the B-side "Masking Tape" released on the "Let Robeson Sing" single)	6:26
15.	"Baby Elián"	3:37
16.	"Freedom of Speech Won't Feed My Children" (contains a cover of the McCarthy song "We Are All Bourgeois Now" as a hidden track)	13:12
Total length:		75:34

Japanese edition bonus tracks
No.	Title	Length
17.	"Just a Kid"	3:30
18.	"The Masses Against the Classes"	3:22

Australian limited edition bonus tracks
No.	Title	Length
17.	"The Masses Against the Classes"	3:22
18.	"So Why So Sad" (Sean Penn Mix – Avalanches)	4:57

== 2022 re-release ==
On 9 September 2022, Manic Street Preachers released new 2- and 3-disc editions of Know Your Enemy. In putting together the reissue, Nicky Wire proposed resurrecting the two separate albums that the band had originally envisioned; James Dean Bradfield agreed on the condition that he was allowed to remix the tracks with Dave Eringa. This meant including six additional tracks not featured on the original release: the non-album single "The Masses Against the Classes", "Door to the River" from the compilation album Forever Delayed (but with the orchestra removed), the B-sides "Just a Kid" and "Groundhog Days" and the previously unreleased "Rosebud" and "Studies in Paralysis". The latter two were released as teaser singles in the weeks leading up to the reissue. Two other notable changes were that The Avalanches' remix of "So Why So Sad" replaced the original and that the track "Royal Correspondant" was removed. Furthermore, the "Masking Tape" excerpt ("Happy black days/Here's the summer...") originally included at the end of "Epicentre" was removed and added to the end of the track "Groundhog Days" and the Albert Camus quotation was removed from the outro of "The Masses Against the Classes."

On the standard 2-CD and vinyl editions, Door to the River is a 10-track album and Solidarity is a 12-track album. On the 3-CD digibook edition, three alternative/original mixes and the outtake "Royal Correspondent" are added to disc one, while B-sides are added to disc two. None of these tracks have been remixed. The third disc contains demos.

In a review of the re-release for Gigwise, Jimi Arundell stated that Know Your Enemy had finally been fully realised, commenting "What was once just a promising collection of hurried ideas, sprawling concepts and spiteful outbursts has now been honed into a coherent artistic statement".

== Track listing ==
Standard edition disc one: Door to the River
No.	Title	Length
1.	"The Year of Purification"	3:38
2.	"Ocean Spray"	4:13
3.	"So Why So Sad" (Avalanches Sean Penn Mix)	4:59
4.	"Door to the River"	4:38
5.	"Rosebud"	4:03
6.	"Just a Kid"	3:31
7.	"His Last Painting"	3:18
8.	"Let Robeson Sing"	3:47
9.	"Groundhog Days"	4:58
10.	"Epicentre"	5:13

Standard edition disc two: Solidarity
No.	Title	Length
1.	"Intravenous Agnostic"	4:01
2.	"Found That Soul" (TLA Mix)	3:06
3.	"We Are All Bourgeois Now"	4:31
4.	"Freedom of Speech Won't Feed My Children"	2:53
5.	"The Convalescent"	5:28
6.	"Baby Elián"	3:38
7.	"Masses Against the Classes"	3:22
8.	"My Guernica"	4:55
9.	"Studies in Paralysis"	3:20
10.	"Dead Martyrs"	3:26
11.	"Wattsville Blues"	4:09
12.	"Miss Europa Disco Dancer"	3:56

Digibook edition disc one: Door to the River
No.	Title	Length
1.	"The Year of Purification"	3:38
2.	"Ocean Spray"	4:13
3.	"So Why So Sad" (Avalanches Sean Penn Mix)	4:59
4.	"Door to the River"	4:38
5.	"Rosebud"	4:03
6.	"Just a Kid"	3:31
7.	"His Last Painting"	3:18
8.	"Let Robeson Sing"	3:47
9.	"Groundhog Days"	4:58
10.	"Epicentre"	5:13
11.	"His Last Painting" (TLA Mix)	3:17
12.	"Epicentre" (TLA Mix)	5:13
13.	"So Why So Sad" (KYE Version)	4:04
14.	"Royal Correspondent"	3:31

Digibook edition disc two: Solidarity
No.	Title	Writer(s)	Length
1.	"Intravenous Agnostic"		4:01
2.	"Found That Soul" (TLA Mix)		3:06
3.	"We Are All Bourgeois Now"		4:31
4.	"Freedom of Speech Won't Feed My Children"		2:53
5.	"The Convalescent"		5:28
6.	"Baby Elián"		3:38
7.	"Masses Against the Classes"		3:22
8.	"My Guernica"		4:55
9.	"Studies in Paralysis"		3:20
10.	"Dead Martyrs"		3:26
11.	"Wattsville Blues"		4:09
12.	"Miss Europa Disco Dancer"		3:56
13.	"Fear of Motion"		2:38
14.	"Pedestal"		4:51
15.	"Didn't My Lord Deliver Daniel"	Traditional	2:07
16.	"Locust Valley"		4:06
17.	"Masking Tape"		4:11
18.	"Ballad of the Bangkok Novotel"		2:38
19.	"Little Trolls"		3:43

Digibook edition disc three: Demos
No.	Title	Length
1.	"Ocean Spray" (Studio Demo)	2:55
2.	"So Why So Sad" (Cassette Demo)	3:36
3.	"Door to the River" (Cassette Demo)	4:53
4.	"His Last Painting" (Air Version Home Cassette Demo)	4:05
5.	"Let Robeson Sing" (Home Cassette Demo)	2:37
6.	"Groundhog Days" (Home Cassette Demo)	4:01
7.	"Epicentre" (Cassette Demo)	4:01
8.	"Intravenous Agnostic" (Home Cassette Demo)	2:26
9.	"Freedom of Speech Won't Feed My Children" (Studio Demo)	2:57
10.	"The Convalescent" (Studio Rehearsal Demo)	5:29
11.	"His Last Elián" (Studio Demo)	3:23
12.	"Masses Against the Classes" (Studio Demo)	2:25
13.	"My Guernica No 1" (Home Acoustic Demo)	4:25
14.	"My Guernica" (Studio Demo)	4:10
15.	"Dead Martyrs" (Home Cassette Demo)	3:28
16.	"Wattsville Blues" (Home Cassette Demo)	2:42

== Personnel ==
Manic Street Preachers

- James Dean Bradfield – lead vocals, lead and rhythm guitar, keyboards on "Freedom of Speech Won't Feed My Children"
- Sean Moore – drums, drum programming, trumpet
- Nicky Wire – bass guitar, lead vocals on "Wattsville Blues", acoustic guitar, backing vocals

Additional musicians

- Nick Nasmyth – keyboards, backing vocals
- Kevin Shields – guitar on "Freedom of Speech Won't Feed My Children" and "Dead Martyrs"

Technical personnel

- Dave Eringa – engineering on tracks 1, 2, 4, 7, 8 and 11–14, mixing on tracks 1–4, 6–9 and 11–16, production
- Lee Butler – engineering on tracks 1, 2, 4, 7, 8 and 11–14
- David Holmes – additional production on tracks 9, 12 and 16
- Greg Haver – production and engineering on "Royal Correspondent" and "Freedom of Speech Won't Feed My Children"
- Mike Hedges – production and mixing on "Let Robeson Sing"
- Gerr McDonnel – engineering and mixing on "Let Robeson Sing"
- Guy Massey – engineering on "The Year of Putrification" and "Baby Elián"
- Tom Lord-Alge – mixing on "His Last Painting"
- The Avalanches – remixing on "So Why So Sad (Sean Penn Mix – Avalanches)"
- Bobby Dazzler – production on "So Why So Sad" (Sean Penn Mix – Avalanches)
- Nicky Wire – creative concept
- Farrow Design – design and direction
- Neale Howells – original paintings

== Charts ==
=== Weekly charts ===
Weekly chart performance for Know Your Enemy
Chart (2001)	Peak position
Australian Albums (ARIA)	20
Austrian Albums (Ö3 Austria)	42
Belgian Albums (Ultratop Flanders)	19
Belgian Albums (Ultratop Wallonia)	25
French Albums (SNEP)	147
Finnish Albums (Suomen virallinen lista)	3
Danish Albums (Hitlisten)	6
Dutch Albums (Album Top 100)	39
German Albums (Offizielle Top 100)	13
Greek Albums (IFPI)	8
Irish Albums (IRMA)	5
New Zealand Albums (RMNZ)	21
Norwegian Albums (VG-lista)	8
Scottish Albums (Official Charts)	2
Spanish Albums (Promusicae)	33
Swedish Albums (Sverigetopplistan)	7
Swiss Albums (Schweizer Hitparade)	40
UK Albums (Official Charts)	2

Weekly chart performance for Know Your Enemy (remastered edition)
Chart (2022)	Position
Spanish Albums (PROMUSICAE)	82
UK Albums (OCC)	4

=== Year-end charts ===
Year-end chart performance for Know Your Enemy
Chart (2001)	Position
UK Albums (OCC)	86

== Certifications ==
Certifications for Know Your Enemy
Region	Certification	Certified units/sales
United Kingdom (BPI)	Gold	219,985
