= Everything Must Go (Manic Street Preachers album) =

Studio album by Manic Street Preachers
- Released: 20 May 1996
- Recorded: 1995–1996
- Studios: Chateau de la Rouge Motte, Domfront en Poiraie, France; Big Noise, Cardiff, Wales; Real World, Box, UK
- Genres: Alternative rock; hard rock; Britpop
- Length: 45:24
- Label: Epic
- Producer: Mike Hedges

Manic Street Preachers chronology
| The Holy Bible (1994) | Everything Must Go (1996) | This Is My Truth Tell Me Yours (1998) |

Singles from Everything Must Go
- 1. "A Design for Life" Released: 15 April 1996; 2. "Everything Must Go" Released: 22 July 1996; 3. "Kevin Carter" Released: 30 September 1996; 4. "Further Away" Released: 16 October 1996 (Japan); 5. "Australia" Released: 2 December 1996

Everything Must Go is the fourth studio album by Welsh alternative rock band Manic Street Preachers, released on 20 May 1996 by Epic Records. It was the first record released as a trio, following the disappearance of lyricist and rhythm guitarist Richey Edwards.

Released at the height of Britpop in the mid-1990s, the album was a commercial and critical success, it reached its peak in the UK on separate occasions, debuting and peaking at number 2 in the UK Albums Chart and earned the band accolades in the 1997 Brit Awards. It represented a shift in the group's sound due to Edwards' departure. The album charted in mainland Europe, Asia and Australia, eventually selling over two million copies. Everything Must Go is frequently featured and voted highly in lists for one of the best albums of all time by many music publications such as NME and Q.

== Production and content ==
Singer-songwriter James Dean Bradfield said that the sound of the drums was crucial on the album to set the tone. He was inspired by the works of several bands, "I loved records like Pornography by The Cure and Joy Division records and Wire records and Magazine records and [Siouxsie and the] Banshees records and Wah! records and Associates records where everything starts with the drums". Producer Mike Hedges was the person the group had in mind since The Holy Bible in part for his production role on Siouxsie and the Banshees' single "Swimming Horses" of which Bradfield was a fan. The band stayed in Domfront en Poiraie, France, to work at Hedges' own studio which contained a mixing desk coming from the Abbey Road Studios.

=== Music and lyrics ===
The working title of the album was Sounds in the Grass, named after a series of paintings by Jackson Pollock. Everything Must Go takes its name from a play by Patrick Jones, Nicky Wire's brother.

Everything Must Go represents a change of style for the band. Their previous album, The Holy Bible, had been a stark, disturbing album with a minimal amount of instrumentation, whilst this album embraces synths and strings with an anthemic rock style, has a more commercial feel and fits with the Britpop movement that was prevalent at the time. According to Wire, the concept of the album used as its sonic basis the productions of Phil Spector and his Wall of Sound.

The lyrical focus of the album is also shifted, due in part to Edwards' departure. Instead of introspective and autobiographical tracks such as "4st 7lb", Wire's predilection for historical and political themes dominates; however, five songs feature Edwards' lyrics – the last time his lyrics would feature in a Manics album until 2009's Journal for Plague Lovers. The album's lyrical themes would continue through their next record, This Is My Truth Tell Me Yours.

Subjects tackled on the album include the life of photographer Kevin Carter, in the song of the same name; Willem de Kooning in "Interiors"; and the maltreatment of animals in captivity in "Small Black Flowers That Grow in the Sky" (which is a quote from the film The Best Years of Our Lives). The latter track, with lyrics by Edwards, can also be interpreted as an exploration of his mental state before his disappearance; the line "Here chewing your tail is joy" for instance may be as much about Edwards's self-harm as it is the tormented self-injury of zoo animals.

Part of the rhythm guitar on "No Surface All Feeling" was recorded by Edwards before his disappearance, making it only the second time that Edwards' guitar-work was present on a Manic Street Preachers recorded track (the other instance being "La Tristesse Durera (Scream to a Sigh)" on Gold Against the Soul). Bradfield typically performs all the guitar parts for their recordings.

=== Songs ===
Due to Edwards' departure the tone of the lyrics and the subjects of the songs changed significantly. Wire stated about the aesthetic and the feel of the album, saying that: "With "Everything Must Go", in the way we talked about it, we were the most timid we'd ever been, because we were very nervous. It was strange because it was the most un-Manics we've been about in an album, and then it was the most successful.

==== "Elvis Impersonator: Blackpool Pier" and "Enola/Alone" ====
The opening song of the album, "Elvis Impersonator: Blackpool Pier", has been described by the band as a song that reflects the way that the UK accepts the American culture and worships it. In the 10th anniversary edition, Bradfield stated that the song suited the mood of the album and reminds him of when Wire and Edwards used to write lyrics together. Being Edwards' work, Bradfield denies that this song or any other written by Edwards and featured on the album is a tribute to Edwards; he just thought that the lyrics suited the album well. In the band's own words, "Enola/Alone" is both "uplifting" and "melancholic", and that's why people can "grab on" as Wire says. The lyrics are also inspired to some extent by Camera Lucida, a 1980 book on the philosophy of photography by Frenchman Roland Barthes.

==== "Small Black Flowers That Grow in the Sky" and "The Girl Who Wanted to Be God" ====
"Small Black Flowers That Grow in the Sky" is another lyric written by Edwards, this song is a favourite of the album's producer Mike Hedges, it was also described by Bradfield as the song where he wanted for the first time to sing the lyrics and take a deep breath. It has been made a parallel between the lyrics and Edwards's condition (see music and lyrics section). "The Girl Who Wanted to Be God" has a title which can be traced to a specific quote by American poet Sylvia Plath, it is the most anthemic and opened song in the album, featuring the most hopeful sound of the twelve tracks, according to the band.

==== "Removables" and "Interiors (Song for Willem de Kooning)" ====
Allegedly a one-take live studio recording that had very little time spent on it, "Removables" was another song whose lyrics were written by Edwards, it has once again a reference to his self-harm, like in the line "broken hands never ending". "Interiors" is a tribute to Willem de Kooning, a painter who suffered from Alzheimer's disease. It was inspired by a documentary on De Kooning's experience of suffering the condition, which apparently left him unable to remember what he had painted.

==== "Further Away" and "No Surface All Feeling" ====
"Further Away" was the band's moment of freedom, where Wire stated that this song could never have been written before in the early years, being described as "almost" a love song. It was released as a single only in Japan. The B-side, "Sepia", is a reference to the final scene of Butch Cassidy and the Sundance Kid, where the two main characters are shown in freeze frame, which then is colourised to sepia tone. As for "No Surface All Feeling" part of the guitar was recorded by Edwards, and Wire describes the lyrics as a tender end to the album, as the song reflects the pain of losing a friend.

== Release ==
The album was released on 20 May 1996. It debuted on the UK Albums Chart at number 2 with sales of 60,000 copies. To date the album has achieved Triple Platinum status in the UK, making it their most successful chart album and spending 104 weeks in the Top 100, with the album still in the top five a year after its release. The International Federation of the Phonographic Industry awarded the album with a Platinum certification, for sales above one million copies. The album presented the band with a new generation of fans, charting in Europe, Asia and Australia. Since May 1996 Everything Must Go has shipped more than two million copies. Worldwide sales of their next album, This Is My Truth Tell Me Yours, were to be even higher.

Four singles were released from the album. "A Design for Life" reached number 2 on the UK Singles Chart, spending 3 weeks in the top 10 and a total of 14 weeks in the Top 100 being certified Silver in the UK, for sales above 200.000 copies. The title track was released as the second single, peaking at number 5 and enjoying 10 weeks in the UK Top 100. "Kevin Carter", the third single, peaked at number 9, spending 8 weeks in the UK Top 100, being the single from the album that spent the least weeks in the charts because the last single, "Australia", reached number 7 and despite tumbling to number 31 in the second sales week, managed to stay in the UK Singles Chart Top 100 for 9 weeks. All the singles thus charted in the UK Top 10, between 1996 and 1997. "Further Away" was released in October 1996, but only in Japan, replacing the UK single "Kevin Carter".

After the release of the album, in the following year the band performed a special gig at the Manchester Arena for more than 20,000 people. Bassist Nicky Wire said that was the moment he knew that the band had "made it". The recording was released as a VHS video on 29 September 1997, and has only been reissued on DVD in Japan. Everything Live was directed by Dick Carruthers. The first 12,000 copies came with five postcards featuring photographs of the band by their official photographer Mitch Ikeda.

A 10th anniversary edition of the album was released on 6 November 2006. It included the original album, demos, B-sides, remixes, rehearsals and alternate takes of the album's songs, spread out over two CDs. An additional DVD, featuring music videos, live performances, TV appearances, a 45-minute documentary on the making of the album, and two films by Patrick Jones, completed the three-disc set. In the 10th anniversary edition the band itself claims that they are still fond of the record, and Wire goes further saying: "I think it's our best record, I am not afraid to say that."

The year of 2016 marked another anniversary for the album, being 20 years since its original release thus the band announced a special anniversary edition which was released on 20 May, the exact day that marked the anniversary of the album. It was made available a standard edition, with a double-CD featuring only the remastered album and the concert at the Nynex Arena and the deluxe edition which includes the full album remastered plus the B-sides, a heavyweight vinyl, the 1997 Nynex Arena concert fully restored on DVD, an exclusive new film about the making of the album, the official videos for the all singles and a 40-page booklet. The re-release was accompanied by a UK tour, which ended at the Liberty Stadium, Swansea.

On 18 June 2016 HMV, as part of their Vinyl Record Week, released 1,000 copies on blue vinyl. These were strictly limited to one per customer.

=== Packaging and dedication ===
The album and CD packaging was designed by Mark Farrow. The CD insert bears a quote from Jackson Pollock: "The pictures I contemplate painting would constitute a halfway state and attempt to point out the direction of the future – without arriving there completely". Inspiration for the album is dedicated to Tower Colliery, Cynon Valley, where 239 miners led by Tyrone O'Sullivan had recently bought the mine by each pledged £8,000 from their redundancy pay-outs, amid strong resistance from the UK government.

== Critical reception ==
Professional ratings
Review scores
| Source | Rating |
|---|---|
| AllMusic | 4.5/5 stars |
| Alternative Press | 5/5 |
| Entertainment Weekly | A |
| The Guardian | 4/5 stars |
| Mojo | 5/5 stars |
| NME | 8/10 |
| Q | 4/5 stars |
| Select | 5/5 |
| Uncut | 4/5 stars |
| Vox | 9/10 |

Being the first album since the departure of Edwards, the band at the time was under pressure, but after the release of "A Design for Life", which was well received by critics and fans, Everything Must Go was the album that introduced the band to the mainstream public. All the singles were radio friendly and the album was a critical success.

Writing for Q magazine in June 1996, Tom Doyle felt that Everything Must Go had "little in common" with its predecessor, The Holy Bible, and saw the album as a return to, and improvement upon, the "epic pop-rock" sound of Gold Against the Soul. He noted the band's choice of producer, Mike Hedges, as a possible contributing factor to the overall change in sound, and drew parallels to the lyrics of Kurt Cobain and the "reverb-laden" music of Phil Spector. Nicholas Barber of The Independent described Everything Must Go as "the most immediate, assured and anthemic British hard rock album since Oasis's Definitely Maybe", noting that the record was more accessible when comparing it to the "crushingly heavy-going" sound of The Holy Bible, especially, he noted, for a band "who once would have spat at the breadhead, corporate-sell-out idea of a hummable ditty."

Vox magazine's Mark Sutherland saw Everything Must Go as the group's "most approachable" album, describing it as a "record so superb it might just make intelligence fashionable again", and surmising that the album "proves that, professionally, at least, the Manic Street Preachers don't miss Richey." Rolling Stone critic David Fricke called Everything Must Go the "most underrated album of the year", describing it as "a record of painstaking melodic craft and thundering execution, a proclamation of physical and emotional cleansing – up to a point."

In a retrospective review, Stephen Thomas Erlewine of AllMusic wrote: "Above all, Everything Must Go is a cathartic experience – it is genuinely moving to hear the Manics offering hope without sinking to mawkish sentimentality or collapsing under the weight of their situation." Reviewing the 10th anniversary edition, Dave Simpson of The Guardian said that the album "achieved the zenith of the Welshmen's original ambition: to conquer the mainstream with anger, art and soul." Writing for Sputnikmusic, Nick Butler concluded that "Everything Must Go is a stellar album, stuffed with great, anthemic songs, and it's a rewarding listening experience. It loses ground to The Holy Bible simply because it's not as unique, but if Everything Must Go is inferior, it's only slightly so."

=== Awards ===
The album was shortlisted for the Mercury Prize in 1996 but failed to win it; however, the album won the award for Best British Album and the Manic Street Preachers won Best British Group at the 1997 Brit Awards. In the NME Awards of 1996 Everything Must Go was named Album of the Year, and the Manic Street Preachers also won the award for Best Live Act and Best Single for "A Design for Life".

"A Design For Life"
The single, certified Silver in the UK, is one of the band's best selling singles.

== Legacy ==
The album remains a critical success, an important album in Manic Street Preachers' career, and a classic of the British music in the 1990s, being frequently listed amongst the greatest albums ever by British music publications.

In 1998, Q magazine readers voted it the 11th greatest album of all time, while in 2000 the same magazine placed it at number 39 in its list of the "100 Greatest British Albums Ever". The album also placed at number 16 in its list of the best albums released in the magazine's lifetime. The album is part of NME's collection of classic albums, and the same magazine placed the album in number 182 on their definitive list "500 Greatest Albums of All Time".

Kerrang! placed the album in number 24 on their list of "100 Best British Rock Albums Ever". The same magazine featured the album in number 22 on their list of "100 Albums You Must Hear Before You Die". The album was placed in number 41 on Melody Maker's list of "All Time Top 100 Albums". In 2016 the album was featured in the Absolute Radio's list of greatest albums of all time.

In the end-of-year critics' lists Everything Must Go was placed at number 2 by NME and Kerrang! while Q chose the album as one of the best of 1996. Melody Maker and Vox magazine placed the album at number 1 in their 1996's list.

The album and was featured in Robert Dimery's book 1001 Albums You Must Hear Before You Die.

Website Clash, before the release of the band's twelfth studio album Futurology, said the following about Everything Must Go: "Sympathetically guided by Mike Hedges and with an empathetic but not overbearing application of strings, Everything Must Go managed to combine the more accessible sound of their early years with the vivid imagery of their previous album. Somehow lumped into the latter stages of Britpop at the time, this record remains one of the decade's finest releases and is an essential listen."

In 2015 the band announced that they were going to celebrate the 20th anniversary of the album with their biggest headline show since 1999, at Liberty Stadium, Swansea on 28 May 2016. Special guests would include Super Furry Animals. The album would be performed in full. Before the final show in Swansea the band would tour the album with a series of UK dates: Liverpool, Echo Arena (13 May), Birmingham, Genting Arena (14 May), London, Royal Albert Hall (16–17 May), Leeds, First Direct Arena (20 May) and Glasgow, The SSE Hydro (21 May). In early 2016 the band announced European dates for the tour in Estonia, Finland, Sweden, Denmark, the Netherlands, Belgium and Germany.

== Track listing ==
All lyrics are written by Nicky Wire; all music is composed by James Dean Bradfield and Sean Moore, except where noted.

| No. | Title | Lyrics | Music | Length |
|---|---|---|---|---|
| 1. | "Elvis Impersonator: Blackpool Pier" | Wire, Richey Edwards | | 3:29 |
| 2. | "A Design for Life" | | | 4:16 |
| 3. | "Kevin Carter" | Edwards | Bradfield, Moore, Wire | 3:24 |
| 4. | "Enola/Alone" | | | 4:07 |
| 5. | "Everything Must Go" | | | 3:41 |
| 6. | "Small Black Flowers That Grow in the Sky" | Edwards | Bradfield, Moore, Wire | 3:02 |
| 7. | "The Girl Who Wanted to Be God" | Wire, Edwards | | 3:35 |
| 8. | "Removables" | Edwards | Bradfield, Moore, Wire | 3:31 |
| 9. | "Australia" | | | 4:04 |
| 10. | "Interiors (Song for Willem de Kooning)" | | | 4:17 |
| 11. | "Further Away" | | | 3:38 |
| 12. | "No Surface All Feeling" | | | 4:14 |

*All tracks recorded at Chateau de la Rouge Motte, except 12 (Big Noise Recorders) and 7 (Real World Studios).

Japanese edition
| No. | Title | Lyrics | Music | Length |
|---|---|---|---|---|
| 1. | "Elvis Impersonator: Blackpool Pier" | Wire, Richey Edwards | | 3:29 |
| 2. | "A Design for Life" | | | 4:16 |
| 3. | "Kevin Carter" | Edwards | Bradfield, Moore, Wire | 3:24 |
| 4. | "Enola/Alone" | | | 4:07 |
| 5. | "Everything Must Go" | | | 3:41 |
| 6. | "Small Black Flowers That Grow in the Sky" | Edwards | Bradfield, Moore, Wire | 3:02 |
| 7. | "The Girl Who Wanted to Be God" | Wire, Edwards | | 3:35 |
| 8. | "No-one Knows What It's Like to Be Me" | | | 3:02 |
| 9. | "Removables" | Edwards | Bradfield, Moore, Wire | 3:31 |
| 10. | "Australia" | | | 4:04 |
| 11. | "Interiors (Song for Willem de Kooning)" | | | 4:17 |
| 12. | "Black Garden" | | | 4:23 |
| 13. | "Further Away" | | | 3:38 |
| 14. | "No Surface All Feeling" | | | 4:14 |

10th anniversary edition bonus tracks
| No. | Title | Length |
|---|---|---|
| 13. | "Enola/Alone" (live) | 3:30 |
| 14. | "Kevin Carter" (live) | 3:06 |
| 15. | "Interiors (Song for Willem de Kooning)" (live) | 3:39 |
| 16. | "Elvis Impersonator: Blackpool Pier" (live) | 2:48 |
| 17. | "Everything Must Go" (live) | 3:30 |
| 18. | "A Design for Life" (live) | 4:32 |
| 19. | "A Design for Life" (Stealth Sonic Orchestra remix) | 4:52 |

Japanese 10th anniversary edition additional bonus track
| No. | Title | Length |
|---|---|---|
| 20. | "Everything Must Go" (The Chemical Brothers remix) | 4:52 |

10th anniversary edition bonus disc
| No. | Title | Length |
|---|---|---|
| 1. | "Dixie" | 0:43 |
| 2. | "No Surface All Feeling" (demo) | 3:38 |
| 3. | "Further Away" (demo) | 3:32 |
| 4. | "Small Black Flowers That Grow in the Sky" (demo) | 3:04 |
| 5. | "No One Knows What It's Like to Be Me" (demo) | 2:58 |
| 6. | "Australia" (acoustic demo, Nick's house '96) | 4:15 |
| 7. | "No Surface All Feeling" (acoustic demo, Nick's house '95) | 4:02 |
| 8. | "Interiors (Song for Willem de Kooning)" (acoustic demo, Nick's house '95) | 2:57 |
| 9. | "The Girl Who Wanted to Be God" (acoustic demo, Nick's house '95) | 3:58 |
| 10. | "A Design for Life" (first rehearsal, Cardiff '95) | 3:56 |
| 11. | "Kevin Carter" (first rehearsal, Cardiff '95) | 3:22 |
| 12. | "Mr Carbohydrate" | 4:15 |
| 13. | "Dead Trees and Traffic Islands" | 3:44 |
| 14. | "Dead Passive" | 3:19 |
| 15. | "Black Garden" | 4:02 |
| 16. | "Hanging On" | 3:01 |
| 17. | "No One Knows What It's Like to Be Me" | 3:05 |
| 18. | "Horses Under Starlight" | 3:09 |
| 19. | "Sepia" | 3:54 |
| 20. | "First Republic" | 3:48 |
| 21. | "Australia" (Stephen Hague production) | 3:58 |
| 22. | "The Girl Who Wanted to Be God" (Stephen Hague production) | 3:33 |
| 23. | "Glory, Glory" | 0:35 |

Japanese 2009 reissue bonus disc
| No. | Title | Length |
|---|---|---|
| 1. | "Black Garden" | 4:25 |
| 2. | "No-one Knows What It's Like to Be Me" | 3:04 |
| 3. | "Everything Must Go" (Stealth Sonic Orchestra remix) | 3:43 |
| 4. | "Kevin Carter" (Stealth Sonic Orchestra remix) | 6:38 |
| 5. | "Motorcycle Emptiness" (Stealth Sonic Orchestra remix) | 6:12 |
| 6. | "Australia" (Lionrock remix) | 5:56 |
| 7. | "Everything Must Go" (acoustic) | 3:33 |
| 8. | "Raindrops Keep Fallin' on My Head" (live acoustic version) | 2:08 |
| 9. | "A Design for Life" (live) | 4:17 |
| 10. | "Kevin Carter" (live) | 3:23 |

10th anniversary edition DVD
| No. | Title | Length |
|---|---|---|
| 1. | "Documentary: The Making of Everything Must Go" |
| 2. | "Small Black Flowers That Grow in the Sky" (Later with Jools Holland) |
| 3. | "Australia" (Later with Jools Holland) |
| 4. | "A Design for Life" (TFI Friday performance) |
| 5. | "No Surface All Feeling" (Reading 1997 performance) |
| 6. | "Everything Must Go" (Saturday Live performance) |
| 7. | "A Design for Life" (Brits performance and speech) |
| 8. | "Enola/Alone" (live from Nynex) |
| 9. | "Small Black Flowers That Grow in the Sky" (live from Nynex) |
| 10. | "The Girl Who Wanted to Be God" (live from Nynex) |
| 11. | "Further Away" (new video) |
| 12. | "Home movie" |
| 13. | "A Design for Life" (video) |
| 14. | "Everything Must Go" (video) |
| 15. | "Kevin Carter" (video) |
| 16. | "Australia" (video) |

20th anniversary edition bonus tracks
| No. | Title | Length |
|---|---|---|
| 13. | "Mr Carbohydrate" | 4:15 |
| 14. | "Dead Passive" | 3:19 |
| 15. | "Dead Trees and Traffic Islands" | 3:44 |
| 16. | "A Design for Life" (Stealth Sonic Orchestra remix) | 4:48 |
| 17. | "A Design for Life" (Stealth Sonic Orchestra instrumental version) | 4:35 |
| 18. | "Bright Eyes" (Live) | 3:13 |
| 19. | "A Design for Life" (Live) | 4:16 |
| 20. | "Black Garden" | 4:29 |

20th anniversary edition bonus disc
| No. | Title | Length |
|---|---|---|
| 1. | "Hanging On" | 3:04 |
| 2. | "No One Knows What It's Like to Be Me" | 3:03 |
| 3. | "Everything Must Go" (The Chemical Brothers remix) | 6:30 |
| 4. | "Everything Must Go" (Stealth Sonic Orchestra remix) | 3:43 |
| 5. | "Everything Must Go" (Stealth Sonic Orchestra soundtrack) | 3:27 |
| 6. | "Raindrops Keep Falling on My Head" (live acoustic version) | 2:09 |
| 7. | "Horses Under Starlight" (instrumental) | 3:06 |
| 8. | "Sepia" | 3:52 |
| 9. | "First Republic" | 3:48 |
| 10. | "Kevin Carted" (Busts Loose – Jon Carter remix) | 7:42 |
| 11. | "Kevin Carter" (Stealth Sonic Orchestra remix) | 6:37 |
| 12. | "Kevin Carter" (Stealth Sonic Orchestra soundtrack) | 6:37 |
| 13. | "Everything Must Go" (acoustic version) | 3:22 |
| 14. | "Velocity Girl" | 1:39 |
| 15. | "Take The Skinheads Bowling" | 2:28 |
| 16. | "Can't Take My Eyes Off You" | 3:12 |
| 17. | "Australia" (Lionrock remix) | 5:54 |

=== 20th anniversary edition DVD 1 (Live at the Nynex Arena 1997) ===
- "A Design for Life" (Stealth Sonic Orchestra remix)
- "Everything Must Go"
- "Enola/Alone"
- "Faster"
- "Kevin Carter"
- "La Tristessa (Scream to a Sigh)"
- "Removables"
- "Roses in the Hospital"
- "Elvis Impersonator: Blackpool Pier"
- "The Girl Who Wanted to Be God"
- "Motown Junk"
- "Motorcycle Emptiness"
- "No Surface All Feeling"
- "This Is Yesterday"
- "Small Black Flowers That Grow in the Sky"
- "Raindrops Keep Falling on My Head"
- "Yes"
- "Australia"
- "Stay Beautiful"
- "A Design for Life"
- "You Love Us"

=== 20th anniversary edition DVD 2 ===
- Documentary: Freed From Memories
- "A Design for Life" (official video)
- "Everything Must Go" (official video)
- "Kevin Carter" (official video)
- "Australia" (official video)

== Personnel ==
Manic Street Preachers

- James Dean Bradfield – lead vocals, lead and rhythm guitar and piano
- Sean Moore – drums, percussion, trumpet and backing vocals
- Nicky Wire – bass guitar and backing vocals

Additional musicians

- John Green – Hammond organ and keyboards
- Martin Ditcham – percussion
- Julie Aliss – harp
- Gini Ball – violin
- Sally Herbert – violin
- Anne Stephenson – violin
- Chris Pitsillides – viola
- Clare Orsler – viola
- Martin Greene – string arrangements

Technical personnel

- Mike Hedges – production
- Ian Grimble – engineering, mixing
- Dave Eringa – production on "No Surface All Feeling", mixing on "Australia" and "No Surface All Feeling"
- Stephen Hague – original production on "The Girl That Wanted to be God"
- Spike Drake – engineering on "The Girl That Wanted to be God"
- Guy Massey – mixing assistant on "Australia"
- Chris Blair – mastering (Abbey Road Studios, London)
- Farrow Design – design and direction
- Rankin – photography

== Charts ==
=== Weekly charts ===
Weekly chart performance for Everything Must Go
| Chart (1996) | Peak position |
|---|---|
| Australian Albums (ARIA) | 55 |
| Danish Albums (Hitlisten) | 40 |
| Dutch Albums (Album Top 100) | 63 |
| Irish Albums (IRMA) | 12 |
| Finnish Albums (Suomen virallinen lista) | 29 |
| New Zealand Albums (RMNZ) | 29 |
| Scottish Albums (Official Charts) | 2 |
| Swedish Albums (Sverigetopplistan) | 21 |
| UK Albums (Official Charts) | 2 |

=== Year-end charts ===
Year-end chart performance for Everything Must Go
| Chart (1996) | Position |
|---|---|
| UK Albums (OCC) | 20 |
| Chart (1997) | Position |
| UK Albums (OCC) | 24 |

== Certifications ==
Certifications for Everything Must Go
| Region | Certification | Certified units/sales |
|---|---|---|
| United Kingdom (BPI) | 3× Platinum | 1,083,005 |
Summaries
| Europe (IFPI) | Platinum | 1,000,000^{*} |
^{*} Sales figures based on certification alone.

== Sources ==
- Price, Simon (1999). Everything (A Book About Manic Street Preachers). London: Virgin Books. ISBN 0-7535-0139-2.
- Heatley, Michael (1997). Manic Street Preachers in Their Own Words. London: Omnibus Press. ISBN 978-0711969063.
