= Intimism (album) =

Studio album by Nicky Wire
- Released: July 3, 2023
- Studio: Door to the River, Newport, Wales; Faster, Cardiff, Wales
- Length: 37:13
- Producer: Loz Williams; Nicky Wire

Nicky Wire chronology
I Killed the Zeitgeist (2006)	Intimism (2023)

Singles from Intimism
- 1. "Contact Sheets" Released: 15 April 2023; 2. "Keeper of the Flame" Released: 28 June 2023

Intimism is the second solo studio album by Manic Street Preachers bass guitarist and lyricist Nicky Wire. It was self-released on 3 July 2023.

== Background ==
In 2021, Wire described the album saying: "It's very fucking fragile. It's got some very off-kilter modern jazz and some C-86 indie vibes to it". The Quietus also commented on the album's influences, also noting the jazz influence (specifically on tracks "Migraine No.1" and "Migraine No.2"), and describing the rest of the album as "anthemic FM rock, arena indie and Americana in its songwriting".

== Release ==
The album's release was preceded by two singles, "Contact Sheets" and "Keeper of the Flame", the latter being available as a free download from Bandcamp.

At the time of release, the album was not available on a physical format, this was a conscious decision by Wire, saying it "might have been nice for vanity's sake" but decided against it, to keep the album "as me as me can be. [...] I don't want the rigmarole of pretending this album is something that it's not." Despite this, in February 2026, Record Store Day UK announced that the album would be released on limited edition coloured vinyl, as part of a series of fifteen Record Store Day releases with '£1 from every unit sold to raise money for children affected by conflict', in partnership with War Child. It will be available on the 18th April 2026, in line with Record Store Day.

The album cover, a polaroid selfie, was taken by Wire when he was a second year undergraduate at Swansea University in the late 1980s.

== Reception ==
Professional ratings
Review scores
Source	Rating
Uncut	8/10
Under the Radar	8/10 stars
XS Noize	8/10

The album received higher critical acclaim than Wire's last work, I Killed the Zeitgeist.

== Track listing ==
All tracks are written by Nicky Wire.

Intimism track listing
No.	Title	Length
1.	"Contact Sheets"	3:08
2.	"Ballad for the Baby Blue"	3:16
3.	"You Wear Your Broken Heart Like a Dress"	2:15
4.	"Migraine No.1"	2:42
5.	"A Perfect Place to Grow"	3:15
6.	"White Musk"	2:38
7.	"Under California Skies"	3:55
8.	"Keeper of the Flame"	3:23
9.	"Tactical Retreat"	3:25
10.	"Migraine No.2"	3:06
11.	"Saudade"	2:40
12.	"As the Light Fades Away"	3:30
Total length:		37:13

== Personnel ==
- Nicky Wire – vocals, guitar, bass guitar, lyrics, drums, glockenspiel

Additional Musicians

- Rich Beak – drums
- Loz Williams – keyboards
- James Dean Bradfield – additional guitars, additional backing vocals
- Sean Moore – drums on Migraine No.1
- Gavin Fitzjohn – trumpet on Migraine No.1 and Migraine No.2
- Clara Enola Jones – clarinet on White Musk
