= So Why So Sad =

2001 single by Manic Street Preachers

Single by Manic Street Preachers

from the album Know Your Enemy
- B-side: "Pedestal"
- Released: 26 February 2001
- Genre: Alternative rock; pop
- Length: 4:02 (album version); 3:55 (single version); 3:46 (Forever Delayed edit)
- Label: Epic
- Songwriters: James Dean Bradfield; Sean Moore; Nicky Wire
- Producer: Dave Eringa

Manic Street Preachers singles chronology
"The Masses Against the Classes" (2000)	"So Why So Sad" (2001)	"Found That Soul" (2001)

"So Why So Sad" is a song by Welsh rock band Manic Street Preachers, jointly released in February 2001 as the first single from their sixth studio album, Know Your Enemy (2001), alongside "Found That Soul". All three members of the band—James Dean Bradfield, Sean Moore and Nicky Wire—share the writing credits. The song reached number eight on the UK Singles Chart, one place above "Found That Soul".

== Background ==
The song includes the line "burns an expressway to your skull", a reference to the final track on Sonic Youth's EVOL album and a Buddy Miles song.

== Release ==
The CD version of "So Why So Sad" includes versions of "Pedestal" and a remix of "So Why So Sad" by Australian outfit the Avalanches, whereas the cassette single includes a live version of "You Stole the Sun from My Heart". Issued on 26 February 2001, the same day as "Found That Soul", "So Why So Sad" was the Manic Street Preachers' first hit since "The Masses Against the Classes" thirteen months earlier.

The single version is shorter, with the phrase "So Why, So Why So Sad?" sung only three times instead of four at the end and the drums finish two bars earlier without a fill.

The single reached number eight on the UK Singles Chart on 10 March 2001. Spending sixteen weeks on the chart, it is the second-longest charting Manic Street Preachers single in the UK, after "If You Tolerate This Your Children Will Be Next", which spent seventeen weeks on the chart. In Ireland, it peaked at number 16. In Finland, the single reached number four on the Finnish Singles Chart, spending three weeks on the ranking. In Sweden, it reached number 26, while in the Netherlands, it peaked at number 88. In Germany, it reached number 94.

== Reception ==
Exclaim! Canada called the track "an outstanding pop song" with a production style "scarily similar" to the Beach Boys. It was the only single from Know Your Enemy to be included on the 2002 compilation Forever Delayed, appearing as an edited version.

== Music video ==
The release was accompanied by a music video directed by Jamie Thraves. The video shows adults and children in swimsuits playing and sunbathing on a beach, while soldiers are engaging in combat all around them. The sunbathers are seemingly oblivious to the battle taking place in their midst. The band is shown performing the song in a futuristic house on top of a nearby mountain overlooking the beach. The video ends with a boy playing baseball with an adult who's throwing a hand grenade instead of a ball.

== Track listings ==
All tracks were written and composed by Nick Jones, James Dean Bradfield and Sean Moore.

UK CD single

1. "So Why So Sad" – 3:55
2. "So Why So Sad" (Sean Penn mix—Avalanches) – 4:58
3. "Pedestal" – 4:50

UK cassette single

1. "So Why So Sad" – 4:02
2. "You Stole the Sun from My Heart" (live at Millennium Stadium, 31 December 1999) – 4:25

European CD single

1. "So Why So Sad" – 3:55
2. "So Why So Sad" (Sean Penn mix—Avalanches) – 4:58

Australian CD single

1. "So Why So Sad" – 3:55
2. "So Why So Sad" (Sean Penn mix—Avalanches) – 4:58
3. "Pedestal" – 4:50
4. "You Stole the Sun from My Heart" (live at Millennium Stadium, 31 December 1999) – 4:25

== Charts ==
=== Weekly charts ===
Chart (2001)	Peak position
Australia Alternative (ARIA)	11
Europe (Eurochart Hot 100)	33
Finland (Suomen virallinen lista)	4
Germany (GfK)	94
Ireland (IRMA)	16
Netherlands (Single Top 100)	88
Sweden (Sverigetopplistan)	26
UK Singles (OCC)	8

=== Year-end charts ===
Chart (2001)	Position
UK Singles (OCC)	162

== Release history ==
Region	Date	Format(s)	Label(s)	Ref.
United Kingdom	26 February 2001	CD; cassette	Epic	
Denmark	3 March 2001	CD	Epic	
Australia	12 March 2001	CD	Epic	
