= A Design for Life =

1996 single by Manic Street Preachers

Single by Manic Street Preachers

from the album Everything Must Go
- B-side: "Mr Carbohydrate"; "Dead Passive"; "Dead Trees and Traffic Islands"; "Bright Eyes" (live)
- Released: 15 April 1996
- Genre: Alternative rock; Britpop; orchestral pop
- Length: 4:16
- Label: Epic
- Songwriters: James Dean Bradfield; Sean Moore; Nicky Wire
- Producers: Dave Eringa; Mike Hedges

Manic Street Preachers singles chronology
"She Is Suffering" (1994)	"A Design for Life" (1996)	"Everything Must Go" (1996)

Official video
- "A Design for Life" on YouTube

"A Design for Life" is a single by Welsh band Manic Street Preachers from their fourth studio album, Everything Must Go (1996). It was written by James Dean Bradfield, Sean Moore and Nicky Wire, and produced by Dave Eringa and Mike Hedges. Released on 15 April 1996 by Epic Records, the song debuted and peaked at number two on the UK Singles Chart.

== Composition ==
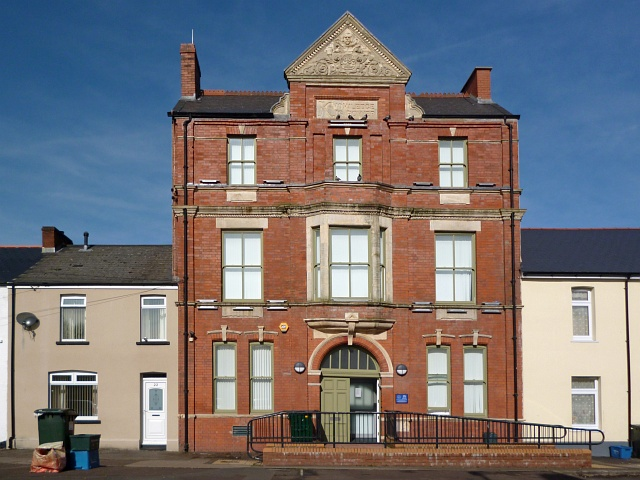
The former Pillgwenlly Library on Temple Street - the inscription below the pediment was the inspiration for the song's opening line

The title was inspired by the debut Joy Division EP, An Ideal for Living. The opening line of the song, 'Libraries gave us power', was inspired by the legend "Knowledge is Power" engraved in stone above the top floor central window of the library in Pillgwenlly, Newport, 15 miles from the band's home town of Blackwood. The next line, 'then work came and made us free', refers to the German slogan Arbeit macht frei that featured above the gates of Nazi concentration camps and which had been used previously by the band in their song "The Intense Humming of Evil" on the album The Holy Bible.

The song explores themes of class conflict and working class identity and solidarity, inspired by the band's strong socialist convictions. Speaking in 2017, Nicky Wire explained that he "was sick to death with the patronisation of the working class. We’re not just Jeremy Kyle – we did build libraries. My dad was a miner". Its video exemplifies this theme further. Various slogans promoting compliance and domesticity clash with scenes of fox hunting, Royal Ascot, a polo match and the Last Night of the Proms representing what the band saw as class privilege. James Dean Bradfield later described the song as "Trojan horse Manics", which utilised radio-friendly rock to deliver a clear political message.

Interviewed in 2014 by NME for their "Song Stories" video series, singer and guitarist James Dean Bradfield recalled that the lyrics had come about as a blending of two sets – "Design for Life" and "Pure Motive" – sent to him by bassist Nicky Wire. The music was written "in about ten minutes" and Bradfield was ecstatic with the result. The band approached Mike Hedges to be involved in producing the song after hearing McAlmont & Butler's string-laden single "Yes", which Hedges had worked on. Wire dedicated the song to Dennis Potter, Dennis Skinner, Arthur Scargill and Antonio Gaudi.

== Release ==
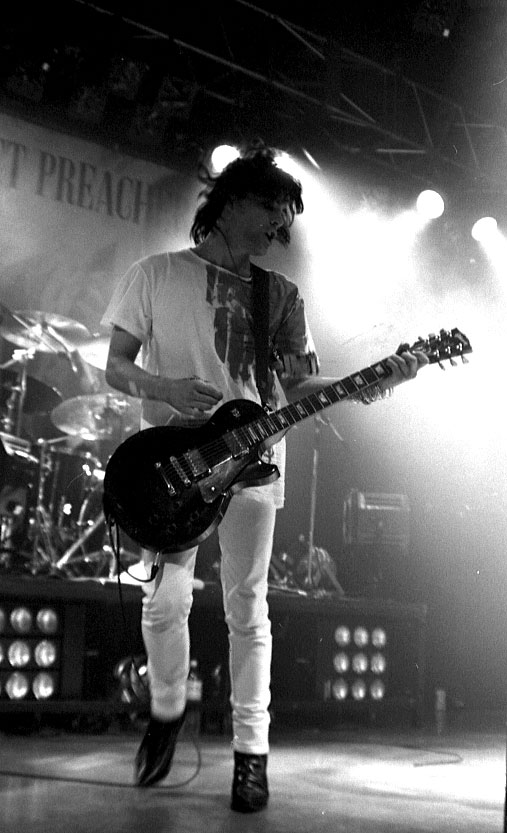
"A Design for Life" was the first release by the band following the disappearance of Richey Edwards

The single was the first Manic Street Preachers release following the disappearance of guitarist and lyricist Richey Edwards the previous year. With James Dean Bradfield later stating that the song kept the trio going during a period of trauma and that it validated them at a time of not knowing whether they could continue as a band. Nicky Wire described it as "a bolt of light from a severely dark place".

Author Rhian E. Jones described the release of "A Design for Life" as "a song which dispenses with reflections on personal memory and the current history of the band, acted as a cathartic release from The Holy Bible. Though less obviously a letting go of the past, this soaring paean to the working classes was actually the most decisive severing of ties to the previous incarnation of the band."

The single reached number two on the UK Singles Chart on 27 April 1996 and was the first in a run of five consecutive releases to be top-10 hits. It spent a total of 14 weeks on the chart, with seven weeks in the UK top 40, being the best performing single by the band, along with "Your Love Alone Is Not Enough". It has achieved platinum status in the UK (600,000 copies). With "A Design for Life" the band also began a run of 11 years where all their singles charted within the top 20 in the UK until 2007, when "Indian Summer" from Send Away the Tigers broke the run by peaking at number 22. The song peaked at number 48 in New Zealand and at number 50 in Australia. In both countries, it only charted for one week. In Ireland, it charted in the top 20, reaching number 17.

The CD single also included the songs "Mr Carbohydrate", "Dead Passive" and "Dead Trees and Traffic Islands", while the cassette included a live version of "Bright Eyes". As part of Record Store Day 2016, 2000 copies were released on 12" vinyl in a copper sleeve.

== Critical reception ==
Professional ratings
Review scores
Source	Rating
Smash Hits	5/5 stars

Taylor Parkes from Melody Maker named "A Design for Life" Single of the Week, writing, "A rock ballad of mammoth scale, shadowed by massive and foreboding storm cloud strings, hinged on a recurring, lurching chord change that suggests only endless and unresolved anguish, it has, inevitably, a gravity beyond their intention. born from newsprint and speculation — but also an ominous, desolate momentum of its own." Music Week rated the song five out of five and also named it Single of the Week, adding, "The Manics' return is a lush but stirring epic and their most commercial single to date. Mike Hedge's production has brought a more radio-friendly sound to the band and this looks like being their biggest hit yet."

=== Legacy ===
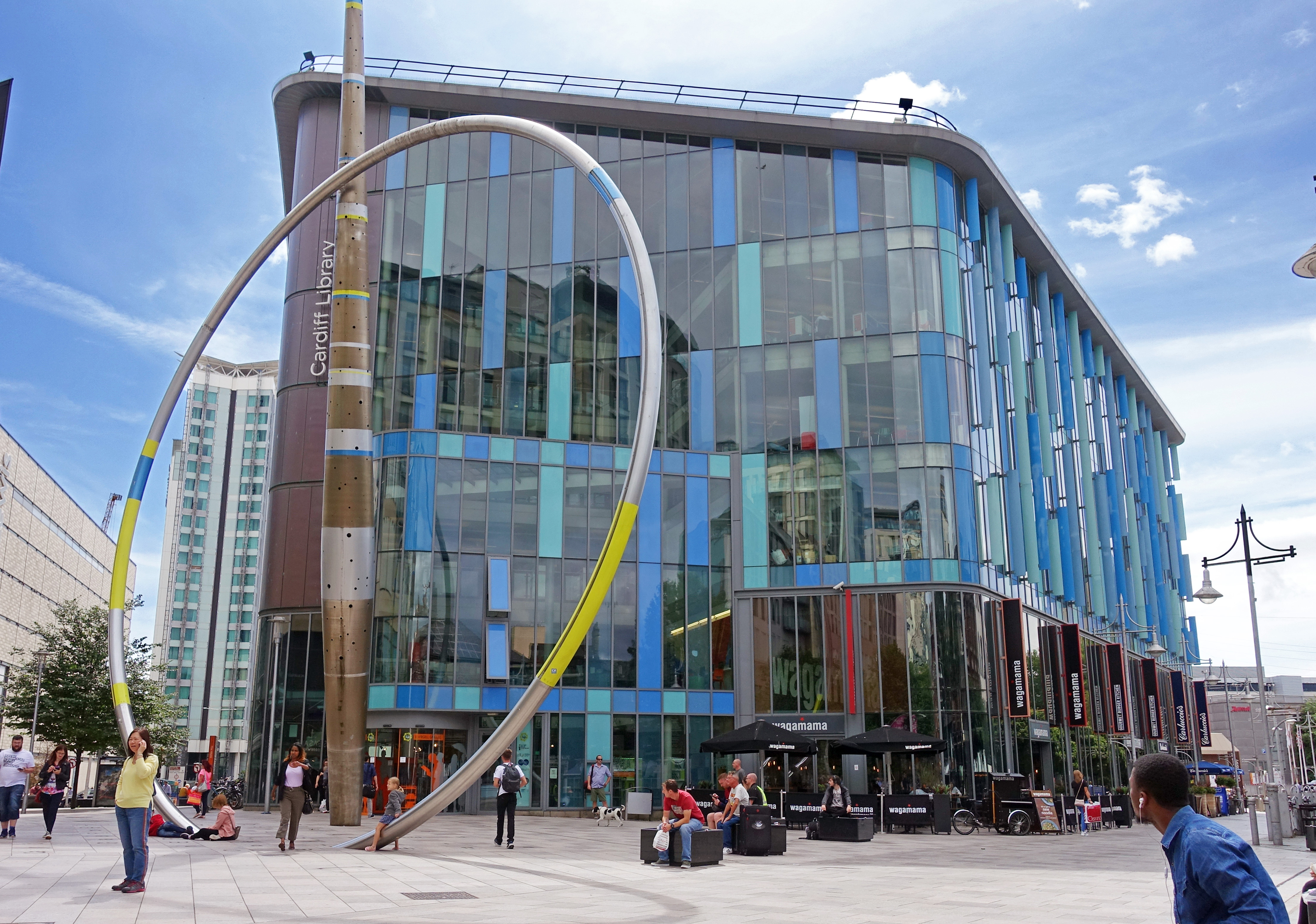
The Manic Street Preachers attended the opening of Cardiff Central Library in 2009, unveiling a plaque inscribed with the song's opening words, "Libraries Gave Us Power"

In May 2007, NME magazine placed "A Design for Life" at number 30 in its list of "50 Greatest Indie Anthems Ever". In October 2011 NME placed it at number 75 on its list of "150 Best Tracks of the Past 15 Years". In August 2016, American music magazine Spin ranked "A Design for Life" at number 31 of the "96 Best Alternative Rock Songs of 1996. The song is also referenced (alongside Beck's "Devils Haircut" and Oasis' "Wonderwall") in the Travis song "Slide Show", from their 1999 album, The Man Who : "'Cause there is no design for life, There's no devil's haircut in my mind, There is not a wonderwall to climb or step around".

On 18 June 2009, the band were invited to officially open the new £15m Cardiff Central Library, unveiling a plaque inscribed with the words to the opening line of the song. At the event, Wire spoke about how his experience with libraries had partly inspired the song. The Cardiff Arms Park Male Voice Choir performed a version of the song, in front of the band, which Wire described as "spine tingling". Wire later said in an interview with The Guardian that the occasion had been a great honour for the band: "For us, it seemed like a chance to give something back to Wales. Seeing one of our lyrics – "Libraries gave us power", from A Design for Life – inscribed on the opening plaque was in its own way as affecting as playing the Millennium Stadium."

== Music video ==
The music video for "A Design for Life", directed by Pedro Romhanyi, reflects the song's themes. It shows the band playing on an indoor stage in an apparently cold industrial location. Vintage advertising slogans, extolling capitalist ideals, are shown, along with archive footage from the 1950s.

== Track listings ==
All music was composed by James Dean Bradfield and Sean Moore; all lyrics were written by Nicky Wire except where noted.

- UK CD1; Australian CD and cassette single
1. "A Design for Life" – 4:20
2. "Mr Carbohydrate" – 4:14
3. "Dead Passive" – 3:20
4. "Dead Trees and Traffic Islands" (music and lyric James Dean Bradfield, Sean Moore, Nicky Wire) – 3:43
- UK CD2 and Japanese CD single
1. "A Design for Life" – 4:20
2. "A Design for Life" (Stealth Sonic Orchestra version) – 4:48
3. "A Design for Life" (Stealth Sonic Orchestra instrumental version) – 4:35
4. "Faster" (vocal mix) (music: James Dean Bradfield, Sean Moore; lyric: Nicky Wire, Richey Edwards) – 5:46
- UK cassette single
1. "A Design for Life" – 4:20
2. "Bright Eyes" (live version) (Mike Batt) – 3:14
- UK, European, and US 12-inch single (2016)

A1. "A Design for Life" – 4:48
A2. "Dead Trees and Traffic Islands" – 3:43
B1. "A Design for Life" (Stealth Sonic Orchestra remix) – 4:20
B2. "Mr Carbohydrate" – 4:14

== Charts ==
=== Weekly charts ===
Chart (1996)	Peak position
Australia (ARIA)	50
Europe (Eurochart Hot 100)	15
Iceland (Íslenski Listinn Topp 40)	11
Ireland (IRMA)	17
Israel (IBA)	7
Netherlands (Single Top 100 Tipparade)	10
New Zealand (Recorded Music NZ)	48
Scottish Singles Sales (Official Charts)	2
UK Singles (Official Charts)	2

=== Year-end charts ===
Chart (1996)	Position
UK Singles (OCC)	50
UK Airplay (Music Week)	26

== Certifications ==
Region	Certification	Certified units/sales
United Kingdom (BPI)	Platinum	600,000^{‡}
^{‡} Sales+streaming figures based on certification alone.

== Release history ==
Region	Date	Format(s)	Label(s)	Ref.
United Kingdom	15 April 1996	CD; cassette	Epic	
Japan	22 May 1996	CD	Epic	
