= Nicky Wire =

Welsh musician and songwriter (born 1969)

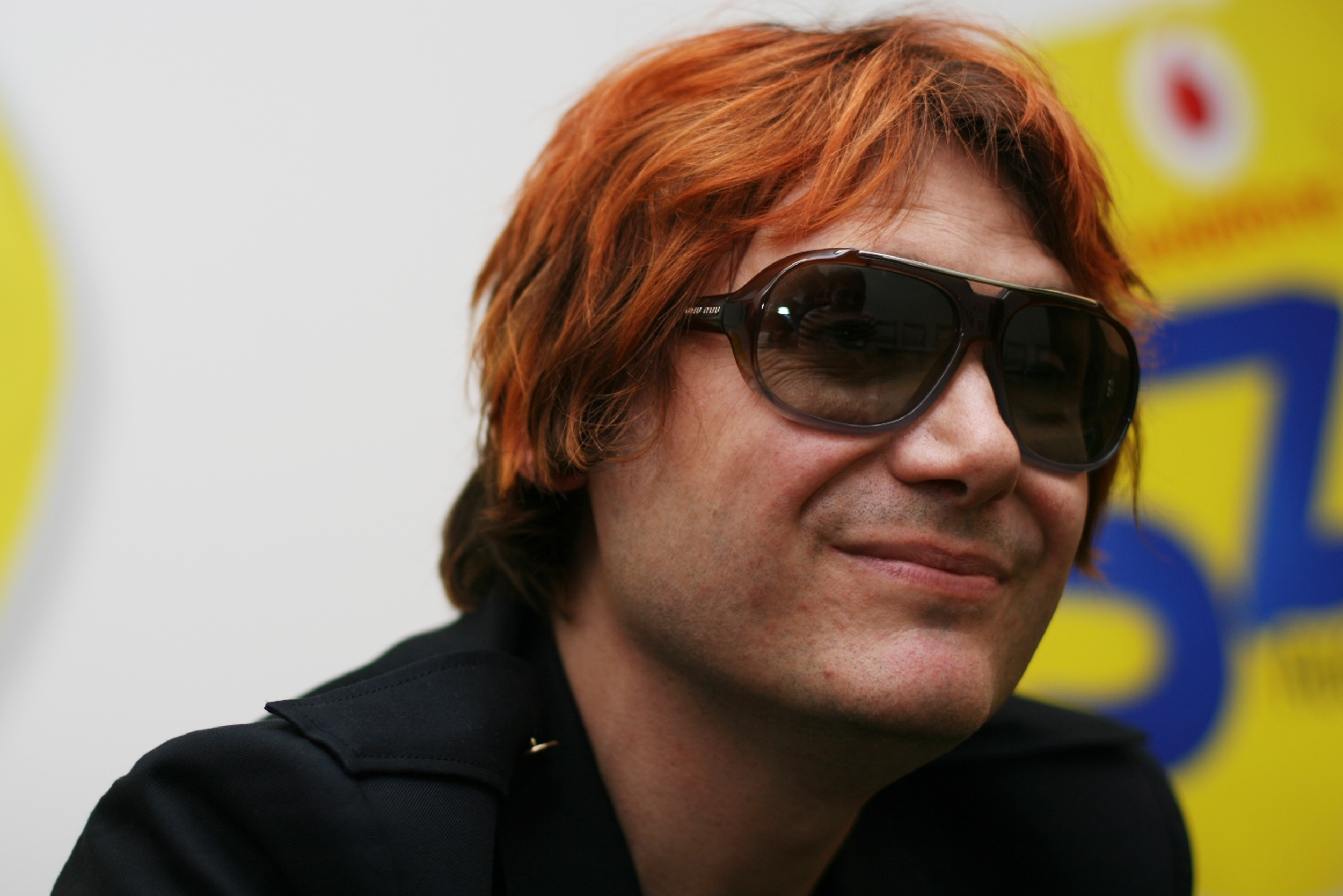
- Wire in 2011

Background information
- Also known as: Nicky Jones
- Born: Nicholas Allen Jones; 20 January 1969 (age 57); Tredegar, Blaenau Gwent, Wales
- Origin: Blackwood, Wales
- Genres: Alternative rock; punk rock; hard rock; post-punk; glam punk; indie rock
- Occupations: Musician; lyricist; songwriter; photographic artist
- Instruments: Bass; vocals; guitar; piano; percussion; omnichord
- Years active: 1986–present
- Label: Columbia
- Member of: Manic Street Preachers

Nicholas Allen Jones (born 20 January 1969), known as Nicky Wire, is a Welsh musician, best known as lyricist, bassist and secondary vocalist of the Welsh alternative rock band Manic Street Preachers.

Prior to the group, Wire studied politics at university: this would later influence his lyrical work. He was co-writer of the band's lyrics (alongside Richey Edwards) from 1989 to 1995, and has been the band's primary lyricist since 1995, following Edwards' disappearance. In addition to his work with Manic Street Preachers, Wire has released two solo albums, I Killed the Zeitgeist in 2006 and Intimism in 2023.

== Biography ==
=== Early life ===
Born Nicholas Allen Jones in Llanbadoc, Monmouthshire, Wales, Wire is the younger brother of poet and author Patrick Jones. He attended Oakdale Comprehensive School with James Dean Bradfield, Sean Moore and Richey Edwards. Wire played competitive schools football and, aged 14, was captain of the Welsh national schoolboys' team. Although he was offered a trial at both Tottenham Hotspur and Arsenal football clubs, back and knee problems brought his football career to an end. Wire took A-levels in politics and law. He later attended Portsmouth Polytechnic, but after several months transferred to the University of Wales Swansea, starting his course a year after Edwards. He graduated with a Lower Second-Class Honours degree in politics, which has led him to comment that he may have pursued a career in the diplomatic service or the Foreign and Commonwealth Office.

=== Career ===
Wire is a founding member of Manic Street Preachers and was originally rhythm guitarist but changed to playing the bass guitar after original bassist Flicker left the band. He co-wrote the band's lyrics with Richey Edwards between 1989 and 1995, taking over sole responsibility following Edwards's disappearance. Some of Edwards' lyrics were used on 1996's Everything Must Go album, making 1998's This Is My Truth Tell Me Yours the first album with lyrics by Wire alone. Wire remains the primary lyricist for Manic Street Preachers, though lead singer James Dean Bradfield has written a handful of songs, and the 2009 album Journal for Plague Lovers contains lyrics by Edwards posthumously used by the rest of the band. Since Know Your Enemy (2001), Wire also has taken lead or shared lead vocals on some songs, with Hiding in Plain Sight being their first single with him on lead. Wire usually plays Gibson Thunderbird, Rickenbacker, Fender Jazz and most recently Italia Maranello basses, one of which is a custom acoustic model made by request for the band's 2007 acoustic sessions.

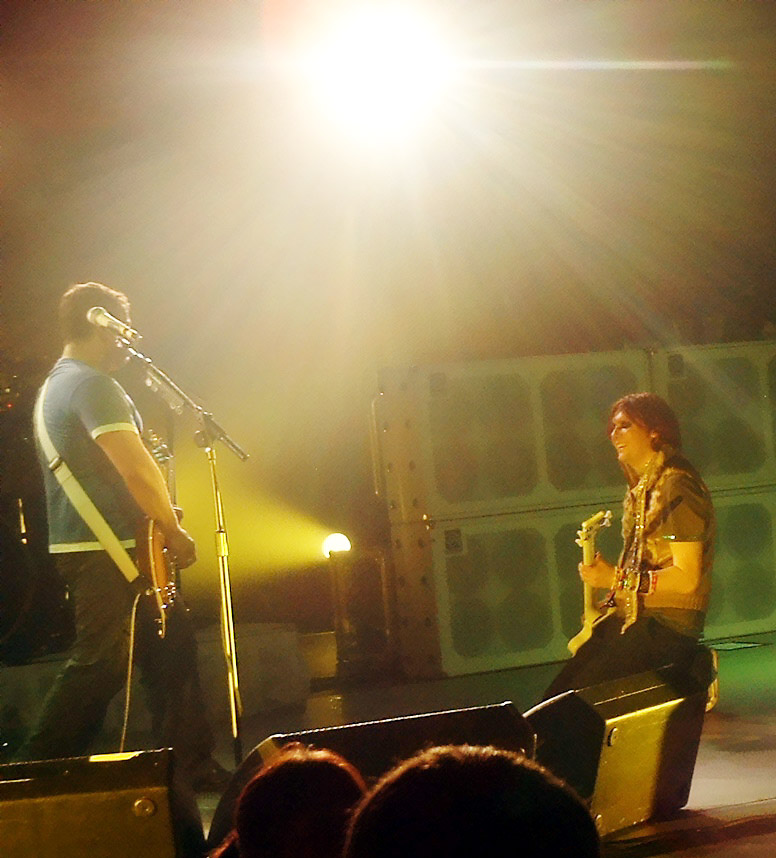
Wire with Manics frontman, James Dean Bradfield in 2005

Nicky chose the pseudonym Wire because of his lanky, "wiry" frame (he is 6'3" or 191 cm). He often dons a dress or a skirt for his group's gigs but has curtailed his flamboyance in recent years. Wire's cross-dressing dates back to his teens, when he would go to local pubs in Blackwood wearing a dress; he has, however, been keen to emphasise that he is not transgender. He partly attributes his attraction to glam and women's clothes to his very close relationship with his mother.

Wire is notorious for his outspoken attitude and has been known to cause controversy in the press. He once stated during a 1992 gig, "In this season of goodwill, let’s pray that Michael Stipe goes the same way as Freddie Mercury pretty soon". However, he has since expressed regret for the remark; stating that it was misinterpreted and "didn't come out the way [he] wanted it to." Wire has noted that his band has taken "inspiration from Queen," Mercury's band, as well as being noted fans of R.E.M.'s earlier albums.

In November 2007, he was recruited as chair of the advisory board for the new commercial Xfm South Wales Radio Station.

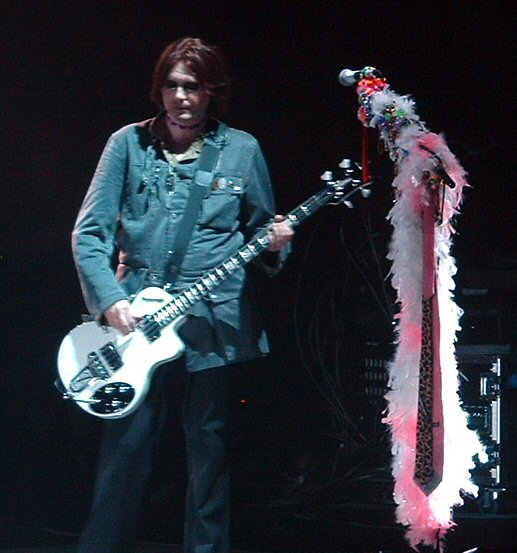
Nicky Wire on the Manics' "Past, Present and Future" tour

=== Solo career ===
On Christmas Day 2005, the Manics posted a solo track by Wire called "I Killed the Zeitgeist", available to download free for one day. In early May, the rumoured first single entitled "Break My Heart Slowly" from his début solo album premièred on BBC Radio 6 Music with Phill Jupitus.

Wire played an intimate solo gig at the Hay Festival on 5 June 2006. The setlist consisted of material from his forthcoming album. Also included was a short acoustic rendition of "Condemned to Rock 'N' Roll" from Manic Street Preachers' debut album Generation Terrorists. Speaking to NME.COM before the gig, Wire confirmed that he was currently working on a solo album and he'd already written 25 songs. On the following day, Wire released the free track "Daydreamer Eyes" on his new website. He released the single "The Shining Path" as an exclusive iTunes only download on 17 July. His solo album, titled I Killed the Zeitgeist was released on 25 September, with the single "Break My Heart Slowly" released on 18 September.

In an interview with NME in March 2020, that also confirmed work on a 2021 Manic Street Preachers album and a solo album by bandmate James Dean Bradfield, Wire announced that he was working on more solo content, joking that he would not have to put in much work to meet fan demand. Bradfield later reconfirmed this, likening their simultaneous solo work to when they did the same in 2006.

== Personal life ==
Wire married his childhood sweetheart, Rachel, on 25 September 1993. He missed the band's appearance on Top of the Pops to promote "Roses in the Hospital" because of the honeymoon and was replaced on the day by a Manic Street Preachers roadie wearing a Minnie Mouse mask. The couple lived in the Newport suburb Allt-yr-yn with their daughter and son.

The family previously lived in a terrace house in the village Wattsville, near Blackwood. Although he was annoyed when the Daily Mirror revealed he lived there, printing a picture of his house with the number clearly visible, he later paid public tribute to his former home in the title of the track "Wattsville Blues" on the Know Your Enemy album.

Wire follows the Welsh rugby union team, Whiteheads RFC and Dragons. He is also a fan of Warrington Wolves rugby league team (nicknamed The Wire), as well as being a supporter of football team Tottenham Hotspur, from whom he turned down an offer of a trial as a teenager.

== Musical equipment ==
Bass guitars

- Fender Precision Bass
- Fender Jazz Bass (with custom third pickup)
- Rickenbacker 4003
- Gibson Thunderbird
- Italia Maranello

Amplification

- Ampeg SV-2
- Ampeg SV-32
- Ampeg 8x10 cabinets

== Solo discography ==
Albums

- I Killed the Zeitgeist (25 September 2006) – No. 130 UK
- Intimism (Bandcamp release, 3 July 2023)

Singles

- "I Killed the Zeitgeist" (Free download from the official Manic Street Preachers website, 25 December 2005)
- "Daydreamer Eyes" (Limited free download from his official solo site, June 2006)
- "The Shining Path" (Exclusive iTunes only download, 17 July 2006)
- "Break My Heart Slowly" (18 September 2006) – No. 74 UK
- "Contact Sheets" (Bandcamp release, 25 April 2023)
- "Keeper of the Flame" (Bandcamp release, 28 June 2023)
