= Futurology (disambiguation) =

Futurology refers to Futures Studies. It might also refer to:

- Futurology (album)
- Futurology (song)
