= International Blue =

Song by Manic Street Preachers

Single by Manic Street Preachers

from the album Resistance Is Futile
- Released: 8 December 2017
- Recorded: November 2017
- Genre: Power pop; rock
- Length: 3:51
- Label: Sony
- Songwriter(s): Nicky Wire; James Dean Bradfield; Sean Moore
- Producer(s): Dave Eringa

Manic Street Preachers singles chronology
"Together Stronger (C'mon Wales)" (2016)	"International Blue" (2017)	"Distant Colours" (2018)

"International Blue" is a song by Manic Street Preachers, released as a single in December 2017. This song is the first single for the album Resistance Is Futile (2018), written by James Dean Bradfield, Nicky Wire and Sean Moore.

An alternative version called "International Blue" (the Bluer Skies version) was released on 9 February 2018.

== Background ==
=== Influences ===
The song is inspired on the artist Yves Klein, with Wire saying that "There was a joy to 'International Blue' that we weren't sure we could convey any more, the feeling of being in love with something like Yves Klein, to pass on the joy of that colour and that vividness – we weren't sure if we still had it in us. It sounds quite young." The band further added that there was a certain naive energy and widescreen melancholia on the song that is reflected through the whole album, comparing it to "Motorcycle Emptiness". Furthermore, the album focused on "(...)things that make your life feel a little bit better. Rather than my internalised misery, I tried to put a sense of optimism into the lyrics by writing about things that we find really inspiring."

=== Music and themes ===
Stephen Dalton of LouderSound commented that "International Blue" was a "lithe and melodic rocker" and simultaneously "muscular" yet "light on its feet". Darren Burke of Doncaster Free Press labelled the single as a "hefty slab of power pop".

Bradfield added that the song "could have been on Futurology but there always comes a cut-off point where we go, 'We've got what we need, let's just improve on what we've got. This lyric is another travelogue-style inspiration. He [Nicky] went to Nice on a break and then he delved a little deeper and discovered new things, artists, and their lives. It's just that whole thing of discovering, moving forward – that's what our process is all about. It's passing the baton, running with it then passing it on again. It's that whole cumulative effect. The fact that it's about a place, it's about a painter, it's about a colour – it's all the things that inspire Nick in his lyric writing that then inspires us to put music to it."

=== Video ===
About the music video, Bradfield outlined that: "Kieran and Nick said that the backdrop just had to be Nice. It had to be another part of that thing where you have an idea of life and what it should be, if you have an aesthetic then if the visual source is already there then just go for it. When Nick gave me the lyric I just sensed that sense of freedom. And when he came back from holiday – he went to Nice for his wedding anniversary – he said he felt completely free when he was there with his wife."

== Release ==
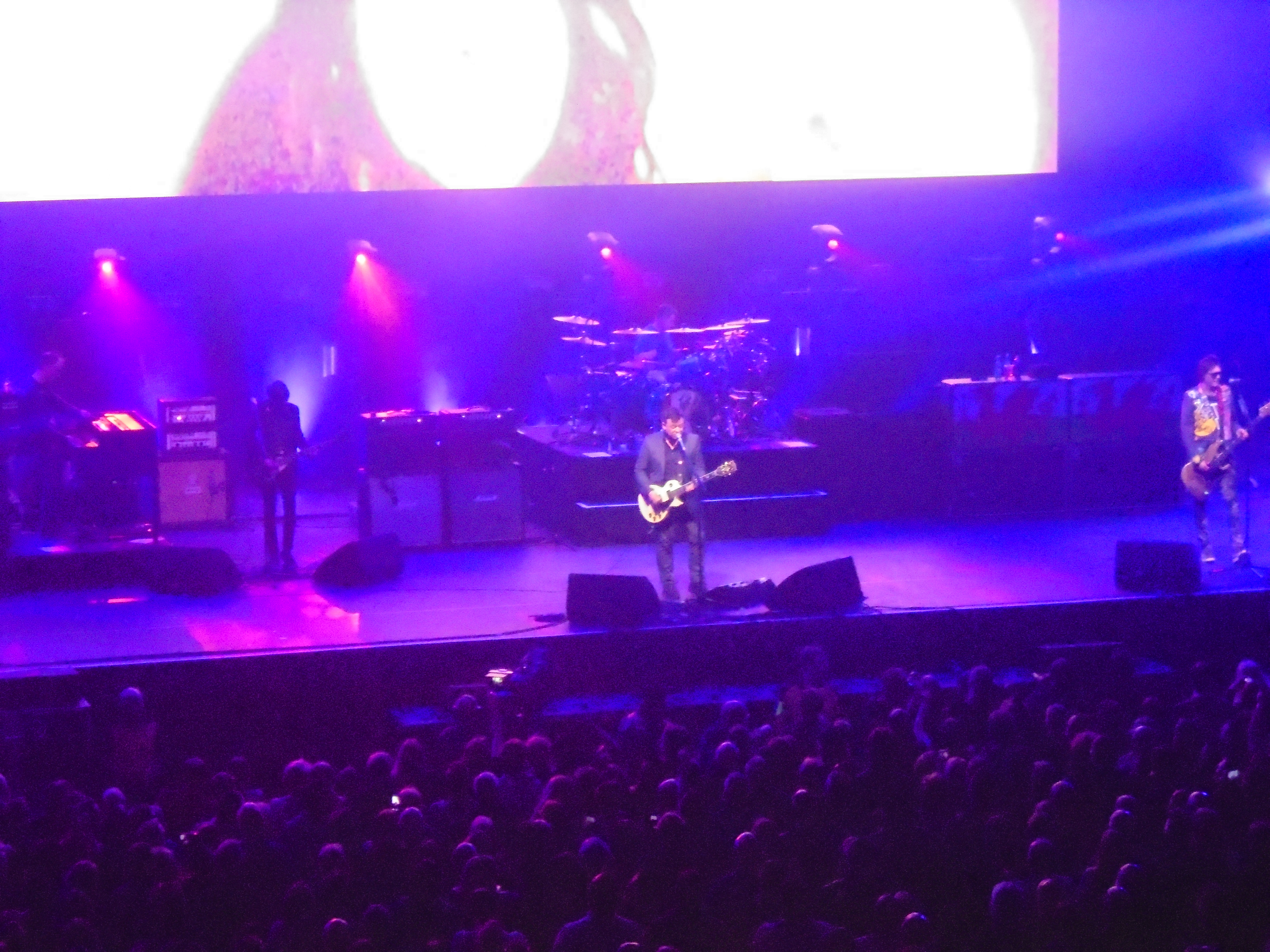
James Dean Bradfield during a performance of "International Blue" at the First Direct Arena in Leeds in May 2018.

The track was released as a digital download on 8 December 2017. It was announced that there would be a limited edition blue 7" vinyl release available exclusively with independent record store pre orders of the album Resistance Is Futile. This was released on the 13 April 2018. The vinyl version of the single topped the official vinyl chart in the same week as the album was released.

=== Critical reception ===
The song received praise from music critics with PopMatters saying that "is the glue that holds the album together", finishing with "It is as if the band are holding a mirror up to their own classic, "Motorcycle Emptiness" as the riff glides in the opposite direction and James Dean Bradfield reflects the same youthful passion for the guitar. In an alternate reality, you could reasonably expect to hear it all over the radio in the same way 'Design For Life' dominated the airwaves in the 1990s."

Meanwhile the NME said that the song "showcases their idiosyncratic knack of writing arena-ready anthems that smuggle in curveball cultural references. This time, it's honouring the vision of French artist Yves Klein, and it's a greatest hit for a band with too many to mention."

== Track listing ==
Digital download
No.	Title	Length
1.	"International Blue"	3:51

Digital download – The Bluer Skies Version
No.	Title	Length
1.	"International Blue" (the Bluer Skies version)	4:32

7" vinyl
No.	Title	Length
1.	"International Blue"	3:51
2.	"Holding Patterns"	2:55

== Personnel ==
Manic Street Preachers

- James Dean Bradfield – lead vocals, guitar
- Nicky Wire – vocals, bass guitar
- Sean Moore – drums

== Charts ==
Chart (2017–18)	Peak position
Belgium (Ultratip Bubbling Under Wallonia)	41
Scotland (OCC)	78
UK Official Chart Singles (Vinyl)	1
