= People Give In =

Song by Manic Street Preachers

Single by Manic Street Preachers

from the album Resistance Is Futile
- Released: 27 July 2018
- Recorded: November 2017
- Length: 3:54
- Label: Sony
- Songwriters: Nicky Wire, James Dean Bradfield, Sean Moore
- Producer: Dave Eringa

Manic Street Preachers singles chronology
"Hold Me Like a Heaven" (2018)	"People Give In" (2018)	"Orwellian" (2021)

"People Give In" is a song by the Manic Street Preachers. It was released in July 2018 as the fourth official single and sixth overall from their thirteenth album Resistance Is Futile.

== Background and reception ==
As for the lyrics of the song Wire stated that: "One of the most open lyrics I’ve ever written. I wouldn’t exactly call it a rallying cry, it’s more about the idea that at least 80% of life is just really mundane so why don’t we all just lower our expectations and try to get to the other side as painlessly as possible. We’re all looking for universal panaceas all the time – if we expected a little less, we’d probably be happier The chorus is 'there is no theory of everything/no immaculate conception, no crime to forgive'. If you can’t do any good, do no harm - that’s my motto!" The single was released after a period where the band completed their tour and were asked to perform in Meltdown by The Cure's Robert Smith.

=== Reception ===
The song was well received with The Quietus saying that it "is an acceptable statement of intent", while the NME said that the song is one where they "mourn for man growing tired, old, forgotten and being sold. But rather than collapsing under the weight of the sorrow of how 'there is no theory of everything', the band gloriously rise from the ashes – driven by their hardened will just to exist and grow stronger."

== Personnel ==
Manic Street Preachers

- James Dean Bradfield – lead vocals, guitar, keyboards
- Nicky Wire – bass guitar
- Sean Moore – drums

== Charts ==
Chart (2018)	Peak position
Scotland Singles (Official Charts)	91
