= (It's Not War) Just the End of Love =

Song by Manic Street Preachers

Single by Manic Street Preachers

from the album Postcards from a Young Man
- Released: 13 September 2010
- Genre: Alternative rock
- Length: 3:27
- Label: Columbia
- Songwriters: James Dean Bradfield, Nicky Wire, Sean Moore
- Producer: Dave Eringa

Manic Street Preachers singles chronology
"The Ghosts of Christmas" (2007)	"(It's Not War) Just the End of Love" (2010)	"Some Kind of Nothingness" (2010)

"(It's Not War) Just the End of Love" is a song by Manic Street Preachers and was released as the lead single from their tenth album Postcards From a Young Man.

The song was made Record of the Week on BBC Radio 2 and added to the BBC Radio 2, BBC 6 Music and XFM playlists.

== Music video ==
The music video, directed by Alex Smith, was premiered on GMTV on 26 August 2010. It is set in a 1970s chess tournament and stars actor Michael Sheen, who portrays an American chess master (although playing with a Welsh flag), opposite a Soviet chess master portrayed by actress Anna Friel. The entire video unfolds in slight slow motion. The match is interrupted when the two mount the chess table and kiss passionately (coinciding with the guitar solo) as the studio audience looks on aghast.

== Reception ==
The single was enthusiastically received by BBC Wales' James McLaren, who stated "Well I like it, I really do. It's got a theatrical pop verve to it. A sweeping string-laden hook, classic Bradders growly verse and a widdly solo in the middle eight. The melody is simple but delivered with classic Manics panache." This Is Fake DIY described it: "It's simple, it's catchy and it's enjoyable, and will have many casual radio listeners rifling through their back catalogue to discover what they've been missing all these years." The NME commented that it had "nostalgia...but also an unmistakable sense of vitality and urgency". In an early review of the album, the NME described the track as "quite literally the daftest, campest, most outlandish stadium pop song the Manics have ever put their minds to. But in a really excellent way, with one of those choruses you only need to hear once to remember forever." The Fly called it a "brilliant start" to the album, saying that it "sets out its grandiose stall from the off as James Dean Bradfield's FM-friendly riff gives way to a warm orchestral flourish".

The single entered the UK Charts at #28, making "(It's Not War) Just the End of Love" their lowest charting single since "Life Becoming a Landslide" (1994). It was the band's last Top 40 hit single.

== Track listing ==
=== CD 1 ===
1. "(It's Not War) Just the End of Love" – 3:29
2. "I'm Leaving You for Solitude" – 3:21
3. "Distractions" – 3:56
4. "Ostpolitik" – 2:58

=== CD 2 ===
1. "(It's Not War) Just the End of Love"
2. "Lost Voices"

(Manics website exclusive format)

=== 7" ===
1. "(It's Not War) Just the End of Love"
2. "I Know the Numbers"

== Chart performance ==
Chart (2010)	Peak position
UK Singles (Official Charts)	28
BEL Singles Chart	38
