= Decline and Fall (song) =

Song by Manic Street Preachers

"Decline & Fall"

Single by Manic Street Preachers

from the album Critical Thinking
- Released: 29 August 2024
- Studio: Door To The River; Rockfield Studios
- Genre: Rock
- Length: 3:42
- Label: Sony Music UK
- Songwriters: Nicky Wire; James Dean Bradfield; Sean Moore; Chris Difford; Glenn Tilbrook
- Producers: Dave Eringa; Loz Williams

Manic Street Preachers singles chronology
"Studies in Paralysis" (2022)	"Decline & Fall" (2024)	"Hiding In Plain Sight" (2024)

"Decline & Fall" is a song by Manic Street Preachers, released as the lead single from their 15th studio album Critical Thinking, on 29 August 2024, with a YouTube lyric video released on 3 September 2024. The song was written by Manics band members Nicky Wire, James Dean Bradfield and Sean Moore, but also gives credit to Chris Difford and Glenn Tilbrook of the band Squeeze as it features a rhythmic sample from the breakdown in the middle of their 1979 hit "Cool for Cats".

== Background and production ==
Regarding the song, Manic Street Preachers bassist and lyricist Nicky Wire stated "It has a lot of energy, even though I don’t feel particularly energised." Manics described the song as an attempt "to create forward motion – a song which harnesses the past to propel it into the future – the lyric is one of realisation and understanding – of celebrating the tiny miracles that still exist whilst accepting and embracing managed decline". The song was recorded at Door To The River and Rockfield Studios, and was produced by Dave Eringa and Loz Williams and mixed by Caesar Edmunds. The song features inspiration from the bands Skids and Simple Minds.

== Critical reception ==
Will Ainsley from The Quietus praises the song for "deal[ing] in galactic heartland rock, all thunderous energy and chiming pianos". Danny Eccleston from Mojo praised the song for utilising "one of [Manics'] strongest tunes since 1996 LP Everything Must Go."

== Personnel ==
Manic Street Preachers

- James Dean Bradfield – lead vocals, guitar, piano
- Nicky Wire – vocals, bass guitar
- Sean Moore – drums
