= Distant Colours =

Song by Manic Street Preachers

Single by Manic Street Preachers

from the album Resistance Is Futile
- Released: 16 February 2018
- Recorded: November 2017
- Length: 3:30
- Label: Sony
- Songwriters: Nicky Wire, James Dean Bradfield, Sean Moore
- Producer: Dave Eringa

Manic Street Preachers singles chronology
| "International Blue" (2017) | "Distant Colours" (2018) | "Dylan & Caitlin" (2018) |

"Distant Colours" is the second single taken from the Manic Street Preachers' thirteenth album Resistance Is Futile (2018). It was released on 16 February 2018.

== Background ==
The lyrics were written by vocalist James Dean Bradfield, rather than Nicky Wire, and inspired by disenchantment and Nye Bevan's old Labour. James said that "Musically, the verse is downcast and melancholic and the chorus is an explosion of disillusionment and tears." The video itself was by their long-standing visual collaborator Kieran Evans and stars actor Sarah Sayuri.

About the political aspect of the song Wire added that "I can't direct my anger at a single thing, politics is so overlapping and everything is so complicated that I think it's really trite to direct it at specific targets" (...) "That's the malaise we find ourselves in. It's the classic case of Tony Benn being the ultimate icon of socialism, and he never wanted to be in the European Union! Everyone keeps using him as a totem on the left, but are desperate to stay in the EU. People don't know their history, they toss things out there."

Talking further about the song Bradfield said that "It was just a song that came together in an amalgam of confusion and dejection at the general election and the American Presidential election," he tells Clash. "I was just trying to kind of trying to figure out how you could define yourself by knowing what your enemy was like you did when you were 16 years old. Which, for me, was 1986, '85, '84. All those years. And I just decided that you couldn't any more because, obviously, the left has fractured, the centre left has fractured, the centre ground was unoccupied..."

== Track listing ==
| No. | Title | Length |
|---|---|---|
| 1. | "Distant Colours" | 3:30 |

== Personnel ==
Manic Street Preachers

- James Dean Bradfield – lead vocals, guitar
- Nicky Wire – vocals, bass guitar
- Sean Moore – drums

== Charts ==
| Chart (2018) | Peak position |
|---|---|
| Scotland Singles (OCC) | 93 |
