= Hold Me Like a Heaven =

Song by Manic Street Preachers

Single by Manic Street Preachers

from the album Resistance Is Futile
- Released: 4 May 2018
- Recorded: December 2017
- Length: 4:18
- Label: Sony
- Songwriters: Nicky Wire, James Dean Bradfield, Sean Moore
- Producer: Dave Eringa

Manic Street Preachers singles chronology
"Liverpool Revisited" (2018)	"Hold Me Like a Heaven" (2018)	"People Give In" (2018)

"Hold Me Like a Heaven" is a song by the Manic Street Preachers. It was the third official single and fifth overall taken from the album Resistance Is Futile. It was released on 4 May 2018.

== Background and reception ==
The song was inspired musically by David Bowie's "Ashes to Ashes" with lyrics informed by the work of Philip Larkin. Nicky Wire explains: "This track sprung from reading Lines on a Young Lady's Photograph Album by Phillip Larkin, and his poem Aubade as well. It was the last lyric written for the record and I knew it had to be special. It's got one of my favourite ever lines, which is 'what is the future of the future/when memory fades and gets boarded up'. We’ve long been obsessed with writing something like Ashes to Ashes; I think this is the closest we'll ever get".

The song also "shows that they still have the power for unabashed pop writing", nevertheless Bradfield at first was not very keen on the chorus, but at the end he decided to give something he usually does not like a try, while it is worth a mention that the drums were produced as a loop.

About the Warm Digits remix, drummer Sean Moore stated that: "Basically, I was a fan of Warm Digits' latest record, and I liked them on Twitter. They contacted me and said 'If we could do a remix for you, we'd gladly do it.' The opportunity came up and it was just easy. I've never even met the lads yet, but with the Internet, it's a relationship I totally enjoy. Maybe in the future, I'll be able to thank them for it. I've thanked them over Twitter and emails and texts, but we haven't actually physically met as human beings. That's the digital world for you."

=== Reception ===
The song has been described by NME as "a true album highlight", and that "the band come as close to hope as the Manics possibly can when they admit: 'I hate the world more than I hate myself'." Furthermore it is said that the single could "plod along and could be grouped together under the heading filler. Sonically it could be cast-offs from 'Rewind The Film'." PopMatters also pointed out that the song is "one of the most beautifully tender songs of the band's career[...]"

== Track listing ==
Digital download – Warm Digits remix
No.	Title	Length
1.	"Hold Me Like a Heaven" (Warm Digits remix)	4:51

Digital download – Public Service Broadcasting remix
No.	Title	Length
1.	"Hold Me Like a Heaven" (Public Service Broadcasting remix)	2:59

== Personnel ==
Manic Street Preachers

- James Dean Bradfield – lead vocals, guitar
- Nicky Wire – vocals, bass guitar
- Sean Moore – drums
