= Dylan & Caitlin =

Song by Manic Street Preachers

Single by Manic Street Preachers

from the album Resistance Is Futile
- Released: 9 March 2018
- Recorded: November 2017
- Length: 3:53
- Label: Sony
- Songwriters: Nicky Wire, James Dean Bradfield, Sean Moore
- Producer: Dave Eringa

Manic Street Preachers singles chronology
"Distant Colours" (2018)	"Dylan & Caitlin" (2018)	"Liverpool Revisited" (2018)

"Dylan & Caitlin" is a song by the Manic Street Preachers, released on 9 March 2018, taken from the album Resistance Is Futile (2018), and written by James Dean Bradfield, Nicky Wire and Sean Moore.

It is a duet between the band and The Anchoress, and it was the third single taken from the album.

== Background ==
About the song Wire said that "James wanted to have something on the album like 'Don't Go Breaking My Heart' by Elton John and Kiki Dee, and I wanted to write something a bit character-based, which isn't really me. The extreme love and extreme hate that can take part in a relationship from both sides. You know us as a band, we've always felt a duty to pass on things that we think are more interesting than we are. From 'Kevin Carter' to 'Let Robeson Sing', it's a part of who we are. 'Interiors' was about Willem de Kooning, Richey had endless reference points. We've always had that desire to pass on. We're always seen as quite a negative, po-faced band, but we're not. It's just been about passing on our love of our inspiration." It stands as one of the few times he wrote a lyric outside of himself.

Bradfield further adds that the song is "conversation between Dylan and Caitlin Thomas at the apex of their alcohol soaked relationship." With Wire finishing with "The story itself rolls through their relationship – drinking, fighting and ended up broken by America. The conversational nature of the lyrics lent themselves to a duet so we asked Catherine to provide the female perspective. She's a hugely talented kindred spirit." The song was released with a video of an acoustic session played live.

== Track listing ==
No.	Title	Length
1.	"Dylan & Caitlin"	3:53

== Personnel ==
Manic Street Preachers

- James Dean Bradfield – lead vocals, guitar
- Nicky Wire – vocals, bass guitar
- Sean Moore – drums
