= Walk Me to the Bridge =

Single by Manic Street Preachers

from the album Futurology
- Released: 28 April 2014; 29 June 2014 (EP)
- Studio: Faster Studios, Cardiff, Wales; Hansa Studios, Berlin, Germany
- Genre: Alternative rock, new wave
- Length: 3:14
- Label: Columbia
- Songwriter(s): James Dean Bradfield, Nicky Wire, Sean Moore
- Producer(s): Loz Williams, Alex Silva

Manic Street Preachers singles chronology
"Anthem for a Lost Cause" (2013)	"Walk Me to the Bridge" (2014)	"Futurology" (2014)

"Walk Me to the Bridge" is the first single released by the Manic Street Preachers from the album Futurology. The single was planned for release on 28 April 2014, but it was leaked earlier in the month.

== Background ==
In an interview about the song's lyrics, bass player Nicky Wire approached the topic of whether the song was about former band member, Richey Edwards or not, (Note: Because it was rumoured Edwards had jumped from the Severn Bridge) Wire stated that:

People might have the idea that this song contains a lot of Richey references but it really isn’t about that, it's about the Øresund Bridge that joins Sweden and Denmark. A long time ago when we were crossing that bridge I was flagging and thinking about leaving the band (the "fatal friend"). It's about the idea of bridges allowing you an out of body experience as you leave and arrive in different places.

The band, especially Wire, have stated that he wrote the song at a critical time, when he was, as described above, tired of being in the band, and he wrote the lyrics thinking of that subject. He later felt differently after a gig in Denmark.

== Release ==
The song was released as a digital download and it was backed by two new songs The Sound of Detachment and Caldey, it also featured a live version of the title song and a reworking of "Futurology", album track, Europa Geht Durch Mich.

== Music video ==
In an interview Nicky Wire said that he wanted Kieran Evans for the music video. The band tried to continue the narrative element that the two previous singles from Rewind the Film had. It was inspired by the film Run Lola Run and the video was released to the public on 27 April.

== Track listing ==
Digital download
No.	Title	Length
1.	"Walk Me to the Bridge"	3:14

Digital download (Walk Me to the Bridge - EP)
No.	Title	Length
1.	"Walk Me to the Bridge" (Live from Ancienne Belgique, Brussels)	3:30
2.	"The Sound of Detachment"	3:31
3.	"Caldey"	3:48
4.	"Europa Geht Durch Mich" (feat. Nina Hoss, Erol Alkan's Mesmerise Eins Rework)	7:27
5.	"Europa Geht Durch Mich" (feat. Nina Hoss, Erol Alkan's Mesmerise Zwei Rework)	7:47

== Personnel ==
Manic Street Preachers

- James Dean Bradfield – lead vocals, guitar
- Nicky Wire – bass guitar
- Sean Moore – drums

Other personnel

- Loz Williams - production
- Alex Silva - production
- Kieran Evans - music video

== Charts ==
Chart (2014)	Peak position
BEL Singles Chart	86
