= Resistance Is Futile (album) =

Studio album by Manic Street Preachers
- Released: 13 April 2018
- Recorded: November – December 2017
- Studio: Door to the River Studios, Newport, Wales; Faster Studios, Cardiff, Wales
- Genre: Alternative rock, pop rock
- Length: 46:09
- Label: Columbia
- Producer: Dave Eringa, Gavin Fitzjohn, Guy Massey

Manic Street Preachers chronology
Futurology (2014)	Resistance Is Futile (2018)	The Ultra Vivid Lament (2021)

Singles from Resistance Is Futile
- 1. "International Blue" Released: 8 December 2017; 2. "Distant Colours" Released: 16 February 2018; 3. "Dylan & Caitlin" Released: 9 March 2018; 4. "Liverpool Revisited" Released: 6 April 2018; 5. "Hold Me Like a Heaven" Released: 4 May 2018; 6. "People Give In" Released: 27 July 2018

Resistance Is Futile is the thirteenth album by Welsh alternative rock band Manic Street Preachers, released on 13 April 2018 by Columbia Records.

Supported by six singles, the most since their debut, the album was received with positive reviews from music critics. It debuted and peaked at number two on the UK Albums Chart.

== Writing and recording ==
Early in 2017, Kieran Evans said that he was not working on the new album with the band, and that he had heard two new songs that sounded "very, very melodious"; the album was expected to be released later in 2017, but then they had to move to a new studio and it got pushed back. Band member Nicky Wire said that this was a very long gap for the group, and if the new songs were not good enough they would not come out. There was much speculation on whether they were releasing a new album at all, with Wire saying that the last two albums might have drained the band in terms of creativity, with the band saying that they were "in a funny place".

Despite this, in November 2017 the band announced the new album, their first to be recorded at their new studio near Newport. Described as "widescreen melancholia" and an attempt to recall the sound of Generation Terrorists and Everything Must Go, the band said that the album came together after some "old school hard work", focusing deep on every song so they could be "as best as possible". The themes behind the album are memory and loss, forgotten history, confused reality, and art as a hiding place and inspiration, with the band releasing further information saying that "It's obsessively melodic – in many ways referencing both the naive energy of Generation Terrorists and the orchestral sweep of Everything Must Go. After delay and difficulties getting started, the record has come together really quickly over the last few months through a surge of creativity and some old school hard work."

It has also been pointed out by Wire that the album is a kind of a mix of styles, with many songs reflecting on past albums: "It was a bit more pick and mix. We wanted to write twelve songs that... not necessarily twelve singles but twelve songs that gave us a bit of vitality." Songs such as "Hold Me Like a Heaven" trace back to "Everything Must Go", and "Broken Algorithms" "has a bit of 'Sleepflower' in it as well." For the first song on the album, "People Give In", the band released a music video in July on YouTube, as for the song itself it "brings listeners through the trials and tribulations life often brings our way and comments on people's responses to it. It's a hopeful reminder of human resilience". Concerning the title of the album, Wire admitted that it's just a bit of "confusion", saying that: "I just can't navigate myself through the digital hysteria and political insanity of the current times. I'd be lying if I said I felt that absolutism of my youth now, because everything overlaps. That's the idea of the samurai warrior being an analogy for us – everyone else has their iPhones and we've still got our guitars."

Bradfield tackled the subject of whether this could be the final album by the band, saying that: "People secretly like to know when things are going to end and for something to have a finite time span, but I instinctively rail against that. I never had the urge to buy a flash car. I never had a drug problem. Instead, I constantly bought guitars. I like to think we push it further than people expect us to. We want to outdo ourselves and people's expectations." On the subject of supporting Guns N' Roses in the summer, Bradfield shared that "I know Duff McKagan and I've played onstage with him before. We keep in touch. He is such a lovely, cool dude. I don't use the word dude much, but for someone like Duff McKagan, it is entirely appropriate. When we were asked to do these dates, we were thrilled to bits."

== Release ==
Resistance Is Futile was released on 13 April 2018 in standard CD format, deluxe CD, cassette and vinyl. The album sold around 24.000 copies in the first week, entering the UK Albums Chart at number 2, despite being number 1 during the week, the record spent a total of 8 weeks in the UK Top 100. However, on physical sales the album peaked at number 1, both on CD and Vinyl.

The album was able to peak at number 5 in the Irish charts, at number 1 in the Scottish Singles and Albums Charts, and at number 1 in the New Zealand Heatseeker Albums. Furthermore, worldwide, the album charted within the Top 40 in Austria, Germany, Portugal, Spain, Switzerland, and Japan. The band also announced a UK tour to promote the album. During April and May 2018 the band played in Newcastle, Glasgow, Birmingham, Manchester, Llandudno, Leeds, London and Cardiff.

On 8 January 2018, the official tracklisting was announced and that the album could be pre-ordered digitally via iTunes, HMV, Google Play and Amazon in standard and deluxe formats from "12.01am local time, Tuesday 9th January".

=== Singles ===
The first single, "International Blue", was released as a download on 8 December 2017. About it the band said that there was a certain naive energy and "widescreen melancholia" on the song that is reflected through the whole album, comparing it to "Motorcycle Emptiness". Furthermore, the album focused on, according to Wire, "[...] things that make your life feel a little bit better. Rather than my internalised misery, I tried to put a sense of optimism into the lyrics by writing about things that we find really inspiring", taking inspiration from David Bowie and seen as almost an escape and a wave of optimism, just like the previous album was described.

The second single, "Distant Colours", was released as a download on 16 February 2018. The lyrics were written by James Dean Bradfield, rather than Nicky Wire, and inspired by disenchantment and Nye Bevan's old Labour. He said: "Musically, the verse is downcast and melancholic and the chorus is an explosion of disillusionment and tears."

The third single, "Dylan & Caitlin", was released as a download on 9 March 2018. It is a duet between the band and The Anchoress, and stands out as one of a few times Nicky Wire wrote a lyric about something outside of himself. Wire said: "[...] I wanted to write something a bit character-based, which isn't really me. The extreme love and extreme hate that can take part in a relationship from both sides. You know us as a band, we've always felt a duty to pass on things that we think are more interesting than we are."

The fourth single, "Liverpool Revisited", was released as a download on 6 April 2018. It is about a day in the city of Liverpool. Nicky added that: "It was on the Everything Must Go (anniversary) tour and I got up really early at sunrise to walk around Liverpool, polaroid camera in hand on a balmy day. It sounds clichéd I know, but Liverpool in the sun does take on a hypnotic quality, with the Mersey and the stone."

The fifth single, "Hold Me Like a Heaven", was released as a download on 4 May 2018. Wire said that the song was inspired musically by David Bowie's Ashes to Ashes, something that the band wanted to write about, and Nicky thinks that this the closest that the band is going to get, sharing also that lyrics were informed by the work of Philip Larkin.

The sixth and last single, "People Give In", was released as a single on 27 July 2018. Wire described the lyrics as "One of the most open lyrics I've ever written. I wouldn't exactly call it a rallying cry, it's more about the idea that at least 80% of life is just really mundane so why don't we all just lower our expectations and try to get to the other side as painlessly as possible."

== Critical reception ==
Professional ratings
Aggregate scores
Source	Rating
Metacritic	73/100
Review scores
Source	Rating
AllMusic	3.5/5 stars
Clash	8/10
Mojo	4/5 stars
musicOMH	4/5 stars
NME	4/5 stars
Rolling Stone	4/5 stars
The Guardian	3/5 stars
The Independent	4/5 stars
The Quietus	positive
Q	4/5 stars

Resistance Is Futile received generally positive reviews from critics. At Metacritic, which assigns a normalised rating out of 100 to reviews from mainstream critics, the album has an average score of 73 based on 19 reviews, indicating "generally favorable reviews".

AllMusic critic Stephen Thomas Erlewine gave the album a positive review stating that: "If the music unabashedly co opts the past, the songs all deal with the present, mixing up the personal and political in equal measure. This seamless blend of aesthetics is also why Resistance Is Futile works musically. First, it comes on strong-all sharp edges and gleam-but once the blare fades, the melodies and their accompanying sweetness lingers, leaving a lasting impression behind." Writing for the NME, Andrew Trendell concluded that: "Still, the Manics are kicking against the pricks just as hard as ever. In their existence alone they continue to fight the good fight – but the sheer scale, pop-pomp and balls on show here render their survival an absolute victory. Resistance may be futile, but the Manics continue to advance", awarding the album with 4 out of 5 stars. As for James Gareth from Clash he said that "the strident jangle of 'Liverpool Revisited' is fittingly evocative of the 'Everything Must Go' era, having been written during a visit to the city for the 20th anniversary tour of that album. It's a lean, melodic beauty, paying tribute to a people Nicky Wire has written of before. 'Sequels of Forgotten Wars' is the closest in sound to the lithe industry of 'Futurology', while 'In Eternity' pays emphatic tribute to Bowie, with an evocative lyric: "Closed the curtains in LA / Opened them up on a Berlin day."

Q said that the band "sound revitalised by the radiance of these songs" and that they are "liberated from the heavy burden of being the Manic Street Preachers". Will Hodgkinson, on the other hand, writing for The Times, said that the band were "confronting their dwindling returns after three decades in the game", but nevertheless they had made their "best album in years". As for Mojo magazine, they gave a positive review of the album, stating that: "Beneath the surface sheen, Resistance Is Futile is a complex, multi-layer work", awarding it 4 out of 5 stars. PopMatters associate music editor Paul Carr said that the album has the most immediate and accessible songs of the band's long career, finishing by saying that "every song on Resistance Is Futile has been polished to its maximum potency without blunting any of the edges. Musically, Bradfield is in fine form throughout as he adds thick layers of guitar and some of the most inspired riffs of his career. Thematically, while it is an often uplifting, celebratory sounding record, there is still a sense of reflective melancholy. As much as the songs celebrate the people that inspire them, there is an obvious doleful resignation at their heart that they have now been confined to history." From musicOMH, John Murphy gave a very positive review of the album, saying that "For those who thought that the life of Manic Street Preachers was winding down to a conclusion, Resistance Is Futile is a fine riposte." He finished by stating that the Manics are "one of the country's most treasured bands".

As of September 2021, the album had sold 56 850 copies in the UK

== Track listing ==
All lyrics are written by Nicky Wire except "Distant Colours" by James Dean Bradfield; all music is composed by Bradfield, Sean Moore and Wire.

No.	Title	Length
1.	"People Give In"	3:54
2.	"International Blue"	3:52
3.	"Distant Colours"	3:29
4.	"Vivian"	4:15
5.	"Dylan & Caitlin" (feat. the Anchoress)	3:53
6.	"Liverpool Revisited"	2:31
7.	"Sequels of Forgotten Wars"	4:21
8.	"Hold Me Like a Heaven"	4:18
9.	"In Eternity"	4:16
10.	"Broken Algorithms"	3:52
11.	"A Song for the Sadness"	4:20
12.	"The Left Behind"	3:08
Total length:		46:09

Japanese bonus tracks
No.	Title	Length
13.	"Holding Patterns"	2:55
14.	"Mirror Gaze"	4:21
15.	"International Blue" (The Bluer Skies version)	4:34
Total length:		58:07

Deluxe edition bonus disc
No.	Title	Length
1.	"People Give In" (demo)	3:54
2.	"International Blue" (demo)	3:55
3.	"Distant Colours" (demo)	3:42
4.	"Vivian" (demo)	4:28
5.	"Dylan & Caitlin" (demo)	3:44
6.	"Liverpool Revisited" (demo)	2:33
7.	"Sequels of Forgotten Wars" (demo)	4:18
8.	"Hold Me Like a Heaven" (demo)	4:18
9.	"In Eternity" (demo)	4:19
10.	"Broken Algorithms" (demo)	4:00
11.	"A Song for the Sadness" (demo)	4:38
12.	"The Left Behind" (demo)	3:00
13.	"Concrete Fields"	3:57
14.	"A Soundtrack to Complete Withdrawal"	4:00
Total length:		54:52

== Personnel ==
Manic Street Preachers

- James Dean Bradfield – lead vocals, lead and acoustic guitar, keyboards, string arrangements
- Sean Moore – drums, soundscapes, machines, sequencers, percussion, keyboards
- Nicky Wire – bass guitar, baritone guitar, vocals

Additional musicians

- The Anchoress – co-lead vocals (5), backing vocals (4)
- Dave Eringa – keyboards (1, 2, 3, 6, 8 & 10)
- Gavin Fitzjohn – keyboards (4, 8 & 11), string arrangement (1), backing vocals (8)
- Nick Nasmyth – keyboards (5 & 7)
- Loz Williams – keyboards (11 & 12)
- Vulcan String Quartet – strings (1, 4 & 5)

Technical personnel

- Dave Eringa – production (all tracks), engineering; mixing (3, 8, 9 & 12)
- Gavin Fitzjohn – production (8), additional production (4 & 7)
- Guy Massey – production, engineering and mixing (11)
- Loz Williams – engineering
- Chris Lord-Alge – mixing (1, 2, 4, 5, 6, 7 & 10)
- Tim Young – mastering
- World History Archive/Alamy – cover photograph
- Alex Lake – band photography
- Kieran Evans – additional images
- Nicky Wire – artwork concept
- Black Finch Design – design

== Charts ==
Chart performance for Resistance Is Futile
Chart (2018)	Peak position
Austrian Albums (Ö3 Austria)	23
Belgian Albums (Ultratop Flanders)	45
Belgian Albums (Ultratop Wallonia)	107
Croatian International Albums (HDU)	11
Czech Albums (ČNS IFPI)	59
Dutch Albums (Album Top 100)	73
German Albums (Offizielle Top 100)	20
Greek Albums (IFPI)	61
Irish Albums (OCC)	5
Japanese Albums (Oricon)	39
New Zealand Heatseeker Albums (RMNZ)	1
Polish Albums (ZPAV)	50
Portuguese Albums (AFP)	15
Scottish Albums (OCC)	1
Spanish Albums (PROMUSICAE)	31
Swiss Albums (Schweizer Hitparade)	18
UK Albums (OCC)	2
UK Album Downloads (OCC)	3
