= Suicide Alley =

Song by Manic Street Preachers

Single by Manic Street Preachers
- Released: 1988
- Recorded: June 1988
- Genre: Punk rock
- Length: 2:28
- Label: Self-released
- Songwriters: James Dean Bradfield, Sean Moore, and Nicky Wire
- Producer: Manic Street Preachers

Manic Street Preachers singles chronology
"Suicide Alley" (1988)	"New Art Riot" (1990)

"Suicide Alley" is the debut single by Welsh alternative rock band Manic Street Preachers. It was self-financed and released in 1988, while they were still an unsigned act.

== Content ==
The sleeve is highly reminiscent of the Clash's eponymous debut album, and was photographed and designed by future guitarist-lyricist Richey Edwards. Around a third of the copies were released in a plain sleeve, and a handful featured handmade covers with glued-on newspaper cuttings, which were assembled by Edwards.

Musically, the influence of the Clash, the Skids and other late-70s punk rock bands is evident – the title track bears a strong resemblance to the Clash's 1978 single "Tommy Gun".

B-side "Tennessee" was later re-recorded and featured on the band's debut album Generation Terrorists. The title was included on all formats of the later single "Little Baby Nothing", partly to curb the demand for the original single which was changing hands for hundreds of pounds.

== Release ==
"Suicide Alley" was self-released in 1988. Only 300 copies were originally pressed. Around 200 came in a picture sleeve. The single has the catalogue number SBS 002. The 'SBS' stands for Sound Bank Studio, the studio in Blackwood where the single was recorded. The numbering 002 was meant to add some credibility by implying SBS was an established record label, but there had never been a release with the catalogue number SBS 001.

Capitalising on the fact the single has never been reissued in its original format, unauthorized bootleg copies of the single started to circulate around 2001. They were produced in the original black 7" vinyl, and also in red vinyl. Aside from the fact the original was never released in red vinyl, the bootleg can be easily distinguished from the original even by a non-expert. The vinyl and its label are reproduced quite well, but the sleeve can clearly be identified as a counterfeit. Most tellingly, the words 'Manic Street Preachers' are underlined on the front, and noticeably inferior pixellated text is in evidence at the rear. This bootleg did not do too much to dent the value of an original copy however, which still commands a high price.

A reproduction 7" single, complete with original B-side "Tennessee (I Get Low)", is available as part of the Super Deluxe Edition of National Treasures – The Complete Singles. "Suicide Alley" does not appear on the main compilation, however, despite the "complete" title.

The band performed the song live for the first time in 22 years at their BBC Radio 2 concert of 27 January 2011.

=== Other appearances ===
Both "Suicide Alley" and "Tennessee (I Get Low)" appear on the 1989 punk compilation LP Underground Rockers Volume 2. The band had sent several copies of the single to record label owner and former bassist with The Business, Mark Brennan who agreed to include both sides on the compilation, which was released by Link Records. All the royalties went to charity. The album was re-released in 1992 on CD, in a limited edition run of 750 copies.

== Reception ==
Several months later, the single was picked up on and praised in music magazine NME, with journalist Steven Wells selecting it as their 'Single of the Week'. Although this endorsement did not provide them with any immediate commercial success, it pre-empted the buzz that would eventually surround the band.

== Track listing ==
All tracks are written by Manic Street Preachers (James Dean Bradfield, Sean Moore, and Nicky Wire).

Side A
No.	Title	Length
1.	"Suicide Alley"	2:30

Side B
No.	Title	Length
1.	"Tennessee (I Get Low)"	3:25
