= Some Kind of Nothingness =

Song by Manic Street Preachers

Single by Manic Street Preachers

from the album Postcards from a Young Man
- Released: 6 December 2010
- Genre: Alternative rock
- Length: 3:52
- Label: Columbia
- Songwriter: Nicky Wire
- Producer: Dave Eringa

Manic Street Preachers singles chronology
"(It's Not War) Just the End of Love" (2010)	"Some Kind of Nothingness" (2010)	"Postcards from a Young Man" (2011)

Some Kind of Nothingness is a song by Manic Street Preachers and the second single from their tenth album Postcards from a Young Man. It features Echo & the Bunnymen frontman Ian McCulloch.

== Release ==
The single entered the UK singles chart at number 44, making it the first ever Manics single to not make the Top 40 since they signed to Sony in 1991. Nicky Wire, in an interview with Absolute Radio, expressed his disappointment, "I was gutted that it missed the top 40", before adding "My excitement always turns into a real dose of fear when I’m waiting for a chart position or to find out whether the radio’s going to play our record,” he said. “It’s like waiting for that envelope to drop through the door and see you’ve got a D in geography.”.

== Music video ==
To promote the single the band performed the song on Strictly Come Dancing. The music video features James Dean Bradfield and Ian McCulloch walking around Cardiff and Liverpool. It makes heavy use of the split screen technique.' An alternate video was posted on the Manics official website on 8 December, which was directed by both Nicky Wire and his brother Patrick Jones.

== Track listing ==
=== CD 1 ===
1. "Some Kind of Nothingness" – 3:49
2. "Broken Up Again" – 3:27
3. "Red Rubber" – 2:57
4. "Evidence Against Myself" – 3:00

=== CD 2 ===
1. "Some Kind of Nothingness" – 3:49
2. "Slow Reflections/Strange Delays" – 2:44

(Manics website exclusive format)

=== 7" ===
1. "Some Kind of Nothingness"
2. "Time Ain't Nothing"

=== Digital download ===
1. "Some Kind of Nothingness" (BBC Live Version) – 3:43
2. "Some Kind of Nothingness" – 3:49
3. "Masses Against the Classes" (Live from Newport Centre) – 3:29
4. "Sleepflower" (Live from Manchester Apollo) – 4:59
5. "Yes" (Live from Manchester Apollo) – 4:45

== Charts ==
Chart (2010)	Peak position
UK Singles Chart	44
