= Postcards from a Young Man (song) =

Song by Manic Street Preachers

Single by Manic Street Preachers

from the album Postcards from a Young Man
- Released: 28 February 2011
- Genre: Alternative rock
- Length: 3:39
- Label: Columbia
- Songwriters: James Dean Bradfield; Nicky Wire; Sean Moore
- Producer: Dave Eringa

Manic Street Preachers singles chronology
"Some Kind of Nothingness" (2010)	"Postcards from a Young Man" (2011)	"This Is the Day" (2011)

"Postcards from a Young Man" is a single by the Welsh alternative rock band Manic Street Preachers. It was the third single released from their tenth studio album, Postcards from a Young Man, on 28 February 2011.

== Release ==
"Postcards from a Young Man" entered the UK Midweek Charts at 36 but dropped to 54 when the official singles chart was announced at the end of the week.

In January 2012, a vinyl version of the single became the tenth best-selling 7" vinyl in the UK during 2011.

== Track listing ==
CD 1
No.	Title	Length
1.	"Postcards from a Young Man"	3:35
2.	"Inky Fingers"	2:41
3.	"Engage with Your Shadow"	3:25
4.	"Kiss My Eyes for Eternity"	2:55

CD 2
No.	Title	Length
1.	"Postcards from a Young Man"	3:35
2.	"Midnight Sun"	3:40

7" vinyl
No.	Title	Length
1.	"Postcards from a Young Man"	3:35
2.	"The Passing Show"	2:30

Digital download
No.	Title	Length
1.	"Postcards from a Young Man"	3:37
2.	"This Joke Sport Severed" (live at Wolverhampton Civic Hall)	3:06
3.	"Peeled Apples" (live at Wolverhampton Civic Hall)	3:30
4.	"Marlon J.D." (live at Belfast Ulster Hall)	2:51

== Charts ==
Chart (2011)	Peak position
UK Singles Chart	54
