= Together Stronger (C'mon Wales) =

Song by Manic Street Preachers

Single by Manic Street Preachers
- Released: 13 May 2016
- Genre: Rock; power pop; arena rock
- Length: 3:50
- Label: Sony

Manic Street Preachers singles chronology
"Futurology" (2014)	"Together Stronger (C'mon Wales)" (2016)	"International Blue" (2017)

"Together Stronger (C'mon Wales)" is a song by Manic Street Preachers, released as a single in May 2016. This song is the official song for the Wales national team ahead of UEFA Euro 2016. All profits from the single sales were given to the Princes Gate Trust and Tenovus Cancer Care. The song began life as a reworking of the Frankie Valli song "Can't Take My Eyes Off You". After the publishers refused permission to use the song, the band went and set the words to an original tune.

During this release week, the single failed to make the UK top 100 through digital downloads yet managed to chart at No.1 through the physical single release.

== Track listing ==
No.	Title	Length
1.	"Together Stronger (C'mon Wales)"	3:50
2.	"A Design for Life" (David Wrench remix)	4:29

== Personnel ==
Manic Street Preachers

- James Dean Bradfield – lead vocals, guitar
- Nicky Wire – vocals, bass guitar
- Sean Moore – drums
