= Postcards from a Young Man =

Studio album by Manic Street Preachers
- Released: 20 September 2010
- Recorded: October 2009 – June 2010
- Studio: Faster Studio in Cardiff, Wales
- Genre: Alternative rock; power pop
- Length: 43:48
- Label: Columbia
- Producer: Dave Eringa; Loz Williams; Manic Street Preachers

Manic Street Preachers chronology
Journal for Plague Lovers (2009)	Postcards from a Young Man (2010)	National Treasures – The Complete Singles (2011)

Singles from Postcards from a Young Man
- 1. "(It's Not War) Just the End of Love" Released: 13 September 2010; 2. "Some Kind of Nothingness" Released: 6 December 2010; 3. "Postcards from a Young Man" Released: 28 February 2011

Postcards from a Young Man is the tenth studio album by the Welsh alternative rock band Manic Street Preachers, released on 20 September 2010 by Columbia Records.

The band described the album to be "one last shot at mass communication". The album achieved commercial and critical success, reaching the number three spot on the UK charts and was supported by the Manics' most extensive tour of the UK to date.

== Background ==
The Manics began recording the album (provisionally titled It's Not War – Just the End of Love) in October 2009 at their Faster Studio in Cardiff and finished in June 2010. In an interview for NME, Bradfield said "We're going for big radio hits on this one [...] It isn't a follow-up to Journal for Plague Lovers." Nicky Wire has said "We've always been about infiltrating the mainstream. It was a conscious decision this time to want to hear ourselves on the radio. Our mantra at the start was 'If you've got something to say, say it to as many people as possible'." In pre-release interviews Wire also compared the album to the Aerosmith album Pump, saying that "it's going to be an amazing album... Send Away the Tigers was Permanent Vacation; this next one is our Pump."

In July 2009 Wire said that the band's forthcoming album would "be heavy metal Tamla Motown. Van Halen playing The Supremes! I know there's a lot of creativity in us and obviously because I didn't write lyrics on the last record I've got tons of words done." Manics biographer Simon Price reacted to Nicky's announcement with amusement: 'Heavy metal Motown? I’ll believe it when I hear it. That Nicky Wire certainly can talk a good game. The thing is with those three lads is they'll sit around before writing any songs and come up with all these wildly juxtaposing ideas and styles, all of which sound great in theory, but when they actually start working towards them it always comes across sounding very much like a Manics record [...] I remember just before the Lifeblood album came out in 2004 Nicky had been telling me it was going to sound like Goldfrapp-meets-late '70s era David Bowie. And I could see what he meant, but when I actually heard it just reminded me of a more subdued version of their other stuff. In a good way though. A lot of the time Nicky goes public with these bold statements and then it comes down to it, it's up to James to try and back them up. That's a lot of pressure to put one person under and sometimes I’m positive James is at home half the time going "Oh no, what have you said this time?". '

Ex-Guns N' Roses bassist Duff McKagan guests on one of the album's songs, "A Billion Balconies Facing the Sun", and four other tracks on the album feature a gospel choir. On their website on 24 June 2010 the Manics posted the message "Magical day in Cardiff: Ian McCulloch singing duet & John Cale playing on a new Manics track in LA." Of the album's lead single, "(It's Not War) Just the End of Love", Nicky Wire claimed "I believe in the tactile nature of rock 'n' roll. There's a generation missing out on what music meant to us... You can only elaborate on the stuff that compels you to. But 'It's Not War' is kind of saying 'Alright, we're not 18, but even at 40 the rage is still there'."

Postcards from a Young Man was recorded with producer and longtime Manics collaborator Dave Eringa and was mixed in America by Chris Lord-Alge. The album cover art uses a black and white photograph of British actor Tim Roth.

Stylistically, the album is regarded as a foray into Seventies-style AOR and power-pop, as well as a pop sound.

== Release ==
The album was released on 20 September 2010, going straight into the UK Album Charts at number 3 and spent 9 weeks in the Top 100. It was released in a standard version, two-disc deluxe version and limited edition box set. In January 2011 the album achieved Gold status (100,000 copies) in the UK. The album reached an astonishing chart position in Greece, entering at number 8, and it also charted within the Top 20 in Czech Republic, Ireland and in Finland.

The album was promoted by the single "(It's Not War) Just the End of Love", which peaked on number 28 in the UK singles chart, their lowest charting single since 1994's "She Is Suffering". The second single of the album, "Some Kind of Nothingness", featured Echo & the Bunnymen frontman Ian McCulloch and entered the UK singles chart at number 44, making it the first ever Manics single to not make the Top 40 since they signed to Sony in 1991. The third and last single was the title track "Postcards from a Young Man".

== Reception ==
Professional ratings
Aggregate scores
Source	Rating
Metacritic	76/100
Review scores
Source	Rating
AllMusic	4.5/5 stars
Clash	8/10
The Daily Telegraph	4/5 stars
Drowned in Sound	6/10
The Guardian	4/5 stars
The Independent	4/5 stars
musicOMH	3.5/5 stars
NME	7/10
Pitchfork	7.5/10
Uncut	4/5 stars

The album was met with positive reviews from critics, holding a score of 76/100 on review aggregator website Metacritic based on sixteen mainstream critics reviews.

AllMusic made a very positive review of the album with a rating of 4.5/5, saying that "everything is bigger than usual", finishing with "All this bustle winds up being the rarest of things for the Manics: it is fun. Granted, it is serious-minded fun with ambition, but with Manic Street Preachers you take fun whenever you can get it, and they've never sounded as ebullient as they do here."

The Guardian rated the album with a 4 out of 5 stating: "This is what the Manic Street Preachers do. As it plays, you're struck by the fact that no one else does anything like it: reason enough for the Manic Street Preachers' continued existence."

NME gave a positive review to the album saying: "Among Postcards from a Young Man's several achievements is that it makes the '90s sound like they weren't an appalling place to be. It was never likely to best Everything Must Go's bravura passion play, but then again, the Manics' 10th offensive is a more playful beast than that - poignant, joyful and above all really, really loud."

Drowned in Sound gave an average score of 6/10 to the album: "It's an album which is self-aware enough to include, late on, a song called "All We Make Is Entertainment", and to end with another called "Don't Be Evil", an acknowledgement, perhaps, that that's all you can ask of a rock'n'roll band: refrain from actively making life worse. For 20 years, Manic Street Preachers have been making life better. They shouldn't worry. But if they didn't worry, what else would they do?"

Pitchfork rated the album with a 7.5/10 and Joe Tangari gave his opinion about the album, saying that: "While I wouldn't say that Postcards from a Young Man is quite the late-career masterstroke Journal for Plague Lovers was, it is still a product of a re-energized band. Whether or not it actually garners them the hits and mass audience they're aiming for (and at least in Britain, it seems inconceivable that it won't), they've managed to make an inviting, populist album that deserves the attention. It's maybe not quite heavy metal Tamla Motown, but it is Manic Street Preachers, and here, that's enough."

== Track listing ==
All lyrics are written by Nicky Wire; all music is composed by James Dean Bradfield and Sean Moore, except where noted.

No.	Title	Lyrics	Music	Length
1.	"(It's Not War) Just the End of Love"			3:28
2.	"Postcards from a Young Man"			3:35
3.	"Some Kind of Nothingness" (featuring Ian McCulloch)		Wire	3:50
4.	"The Descent (Pages 1 & 2)"			3:27
5.	"Hazelton Avenue"			3:23
6.	"Auto-Intoxication" (featuring John Cale)			3:47
7.	"Golden Platitudes"		Wire	4:23
8.	"I Think I Found It"	Bradfield		3:06
9.	"A Billion Balconies Facing the Sun" (featuring Duff McKagan)			3:39
10.	"All We Make Is Entertainment"			4:15
11.	"The Future Has Been Here 4Ever"			3:38
12.	"Don't Be Evil"			3:18
Total length:				43:48

Japan bonus tracks
No.	Title	Length
13.	"Red Rubber"	2:57
14.	"Evidence Against Myself"	3:00
Total length:		49:45

Deluxe Edition bonus disc: Original Demos
No.	Title	Length
1.	"(It's Not War) Just the End of Love" (demo)	3:29
2.	"Postcards from a Young Man" (demo)	3:32
3.	"Some Kind of Nothingness" (demo)	3:56
4.	"The Descent (Pages 1 & 2)" (demo)	3:23
5.	"Hazelton Avenue" (demo)	3:04
6.	"Auto-Intoxication" (demo)	3:48
7.	"Golden Platitudes" (demo)	4:21
8.	"I Think I Found It" (demo)	3:06
9.	"A Billion Balconies Facing the Sun" (demo)	3:31
10.	"All We Make Is Entertainment" (demo)	3:42
11.	"The Future Has Been Here 4 Ever" (demo)	3:46
12.	"Don't Be Evil" (demo)	3:27
Total length:		43:10

Deluxe Box Set Edition bonus cassette: Original Demos
No.	Title	Length
13.	"(It's Not War) Just the End of Love" (Nicky Wire original demo)	3:29

Deluxe Box Set Edition bonus DVD
No.	Title	Length
14.	"Making of Postcards from a Young Man" (documentary)	30:00

== Personnel ==
Manic Street Preachers

- James Dean Bradfield – lead vocals, lead and rhythm guitar, mandola on "I Think I Found It"
- Sean Moore – drums, percussion, trumpet
- Nicky Wire – bass guitar, acoustic guitar, lead vocals on "The Future Has Been Here 4Ever", backing vocals

Additional musicians

- Ian McCulloch – co-lead vocals on "Some Kind of Nothingness"
- John Cale – keyboards and noise on "Auto-Intoxication"
- Duff McKagan – bass guitar on "A Billion Balconies Facing the Sun"
- Loz Williams – piano, Hammond organ, Mellotron
- Nick Naysmith – piano and Hammond organ
- Catrin Wyn Southall – vocal arrangement and backing vocals
- Melissa Henry – backing vocals
- Osian Rowlands – backing vocals
- Gareth Treseder – backing vocals
- Fflur Rowlands – backing vocals
- Roland George – backing vocals
- Aled Powys Williams – backing vocals
- Andy Walters – string arrangement and strings
- Joanna Walters – strings
- Carly Worsford – strings
- Bernard Kane – strings
- Simon Howes – strings
- Nathan Stone – strings
- Richard Phillips – strings
- Claudine Liddington – strings

Technical personnel

- Dave Eringa – production, engineering, mixing on "The Future Has Been Here 4Ever"
- Loz Williams – engineering
- Chris Lord-Alge – mixing
- Tom Elmhirst – mixing on "Golden Pladitudes"
- Howie Weinberg – mastering
- Nicky Wire – artwork
- Steve Stacey – artwork
- Glenn Lutchford – front cover photograph of Tim Roth

== Charts and certifications ==
=== Weekly charts ===
Weekly chart performance for Postcards from a Young Man
Chart (2010)	Peak position
Belgian Albums (Ultratop Flanders)	55
Czech Albums (ČNS IFPI)	10
Dutch Albums (Album Top 100)	62
Finnish Albums (Suomen virallinen lista)	20
German Albums (Offizielle Top 100)	65
Greek Albums (IFPI)	8
Irish Albums (IRMA)	13
Scottish Albums (OCC)	2
Spanish Albums (Promusicae)	61
Swedish Albums (Sverigetopplistan)	45
Swiss Albums (Schweizer Hitparade)	87
UK Albums (OCC)	3
UK Album Downloads (OCC)	2

=== Year-end charts ===
Year-end chart performance for Postcards from a Young Man
Chart (2010)	Position
UK Albums (OCC)	141

=== Certifications ===
Certifications for Postcards from a Young Man
Region	Certification	Certified units/sales
United Kingdom (BPI)	Gold	100,000^{^}
^{^} Shipments figures based on certification alone.
