= Liverpool Revisited =

Song by Manic Street Preachers

Single by Manic Street Preachers

from the album Resistance Is Futile
- Released: 6 April 2018
- Recorded: December 2017
- Length: 2:31
- Label: Sony
- Songwriters: Nicky Wire, James Dean Bradfield, Sean Moore
- Producer: Dave Eringa

Manic Street Preachers singles chronology
"Dylan & Caitlin" (2018)	"Liverpool Revisited" (2018)	"Hold Me Like a Heaven" (2018)

"Liverpool Revisited" is a song by the Manic Street Preachers, it was the fourth single taken from their album Resistance Is Futile. Written by Nicky Wire, it was released on 6 April 2018.

== Writing and context ==
The song is an attempt to eulogise the Merseyside city and give a salute to the defiance and perseverance of those who lost their loved ones in the Hillsborough disaster.

According to Bradfield, Wire wrote all components of the song: "It's about the 'Justice For The Victims Of Hillsborough' campaign. That campaign fought the entire British establishment to get to the truth, and they finally got there with their ruling." (...) "Nick wrote this song in its entirety. I think I'd gone home for tea with the family and by the time I got back, he'd done a guitar solo – which is a bit cheeky. When he gets into the flow of doing a song on his own, it does just flow." He added that: "When the ruling came out of the High Court, we were just about to do a gig at the Liverpool Echo Arena, and Nick had a day down on the waterfront where he just took loads of Polaroids and wrote loads of poetry, as he does."

== Reception ==
About the song musicOMH said that: "Liverpool Revisited acts as an upbeat tribute to the families affected by Hillsborough – a more upbeat, stirring anthem than the bleak SYMM, with talk of "dignity and pride, poetry and life".

As for The Quietus they said that the song is "melodramatic and passionate", stating that: "Wire's lyrics narrating a time he was overcome by tears, wandering around Liverpool with his polaroid camera and musing on the city's physical beauty and its defiant fight for justice following the Hillsborough disaster. Its lyrics are simple and direct (...) it is genuinely touching."

== Music video ==
On the day of release the band shared a lyric video on YouTube.

== Track listing ==
No.	Title	Length
1.	"Liverpool Revisited"	2:31

== Personnel ==
Manic Street Preachers

- James Dean Bradfield – lead vocals, guitar
- Nicky Wire – vocals, bass guitar
- Sean Moore – drums
