= Manic Street Preachers =

Welsh rock band

- Manic Street Preachers in 2024. From left to right: touring member Nick Nasmyth, James Dean Bradfield, touring member Wayne Murray, Sean Moore and Nicky Wire.

Background information
- Also known as: The Manics
- Origin: Blackwood, Caerphilly, Wales
- Genres: Alternative rock; pop rock; punk rock; glam rock; hard rock; post-punk
- Years active: 1986–present
- Labels: Columbia; Epic; Heavenly; Damaged Goods
- Members: James Dean Bradfield; Sean Moore; Nicky Wire
- Past members: Miles Woodward; Richey Edwards
- Website: www.manicstreetpreachers.com

Manic Street Preachers (also informally referred to as the Manics) are a Welsh rock band formed in Blackwood, Caerphilly, in 1986. Since 1995, the band has been a three-piece of Nicky Wire (bass) and cousins James Dean Bradfield (vocals/guitar) and Sean Moore (drums). They form a key part of the 1990s Welsh Cool Cymru cultural movement. The band's early releases were in a punk vein, eventually broadening to a wider alternative rock sound. Their early combination of androgynous glam imagery and lyrics about "culture, alienation, boredom and despair" gained them a loyal following.

As a four-piece with Richey Edwards (guitar), the band's first charting single was "Motown Junk" in 1991, followed by their first two albums, Generation Terrorists in 1992 and Gold Against the Soul in 1993. 1994's The Holy Bible was the last album with Edwards, who disappeared in February 1995 and was legally presumed deceased in 2008. After a six-month hiatus, and with the blessing of Edwards' family, the remaining members chose to continue, achieving commercial success with the first post-Edwards album, 1996's Everything Must Go, which reached No. 2 in the UK Albums Chart. The follow-up album, 1998's This Is My Truth Tell Me Yours, reached No. 1.

The Manics have headlined festivals including Glastonbury, T in the Park, V Festival and Reading, winning eleven NME Awards, eight Q Awards and four BRIT Awards. They were nominated for the Mercury Prize in 1996 and 1999, and have had one nomination for the MTV Europe Music Awards. The band have sold more than ten million albums worldwide. All of their studio albums have made the UK Top 20, with This Is My Truth Tell Me Yours and The Ultra Vivid Lament (2021) both reaching No. 1. From 1991 to 2010, they had 34 consecutive Top 40 singles in the UK, including Top 10 hits with "Theme from M.A.S.H (Suicide Is Painless)" (1992), "A Design for Life", "Everything Must Go", "Kevin Carter", "Australia" (all 1996), their first No. 1 single "If You Tolerate This Your Children Will Be Next" (1998), "You Stole the Sun from My Heart" (1999), their second No. 1 single "The Masses Against the Classes" (2000), "So Why So Sad", "Found That Soul" (both 2001), "There by the Grace of God" (2002), "The Love of Richard Nixon" (2004), "Empty Souls" (2005), "Your Love Alone Is Not Enough" and "Autumnsong" (both 2007).

== History ==
=== Formation and early years (1986–1990) ===
Manic Street Preachers formed in 1986 at Oakdale Comprehensive School, Blackwood, South Wales, which all the band members attended. Their first line-up consisted of singer and guitarist James Dean Bradfield, rhythm guitarist Nicky Wire, bassist Miles "Flicker" Woodward, and drummer Sean Moore. Bradfield and the slightly older Moore are cousins and shared bunk beds in the Bradfield family home after Moore's parents divorced. During the band's early years, Bradfield, alongside the classically trained Moore, primarily wrote the music while Wire focused on the lyrics. Some of their earliest performances were held at the Blackwood Miners Welfare Institute in the town. The band's name came from Bradfield's busking when he was 16:

"I left [comprehensive school], and you've got that summer off to think about what you're gonna do in the future. And that's when I picked up a guitar and I started to go busking everyday. [...] And I had a spot in Cardiff, right next to a tramp, and I made friends with him. I'd come along everyday and I'd wake him up, and he'd say "Oh my God, it's the Manic Street Preacher again". And I just kept the name [...] I thought that's pretty cool, that's better than anything I can come up with."

— James Dean Bradfield, US Interview, February 1995,

Woodward left the band in early 1988, reportedly because he believed that the band were moving away from their punk roots. The band continued as a three-piece, with Wire switching from rhythm guitar to bass, and in 1988 they released their first single, "Suicide Alley". Despite its poor recording quality, this single provides an early insight into both Bradfield's guitar work and Moore's live drumming. NME gave "Suicide Alley" an enthusiastic review, citing a press release by the band's friend Richey James Edwards: "We are as far away from anything in the '80s as possible." In 1989, Edwards, who drove the band to and from gigs, joined the band as rhythm guitarist and co-lyricist alongside Wire. Edwards also designed the record sleeves, artwork and the spray stenciled jumpers the band began wearing, with slogans such as "SUICIDE SOLUTION", "GENERATION TERRORIST", "CULTURE OF DESTRUCTION" and "KILL YOURSELF".

In 1990, Manic Street Preachers signed a deal with label Damaged Goods Records for one EP. The four-track New Art Riot E.P. attracted as much media interest for its attacks on fellow musicians as for the actual music.

=== "Motown Junk" to The Holy Bible (1991–1994) ===
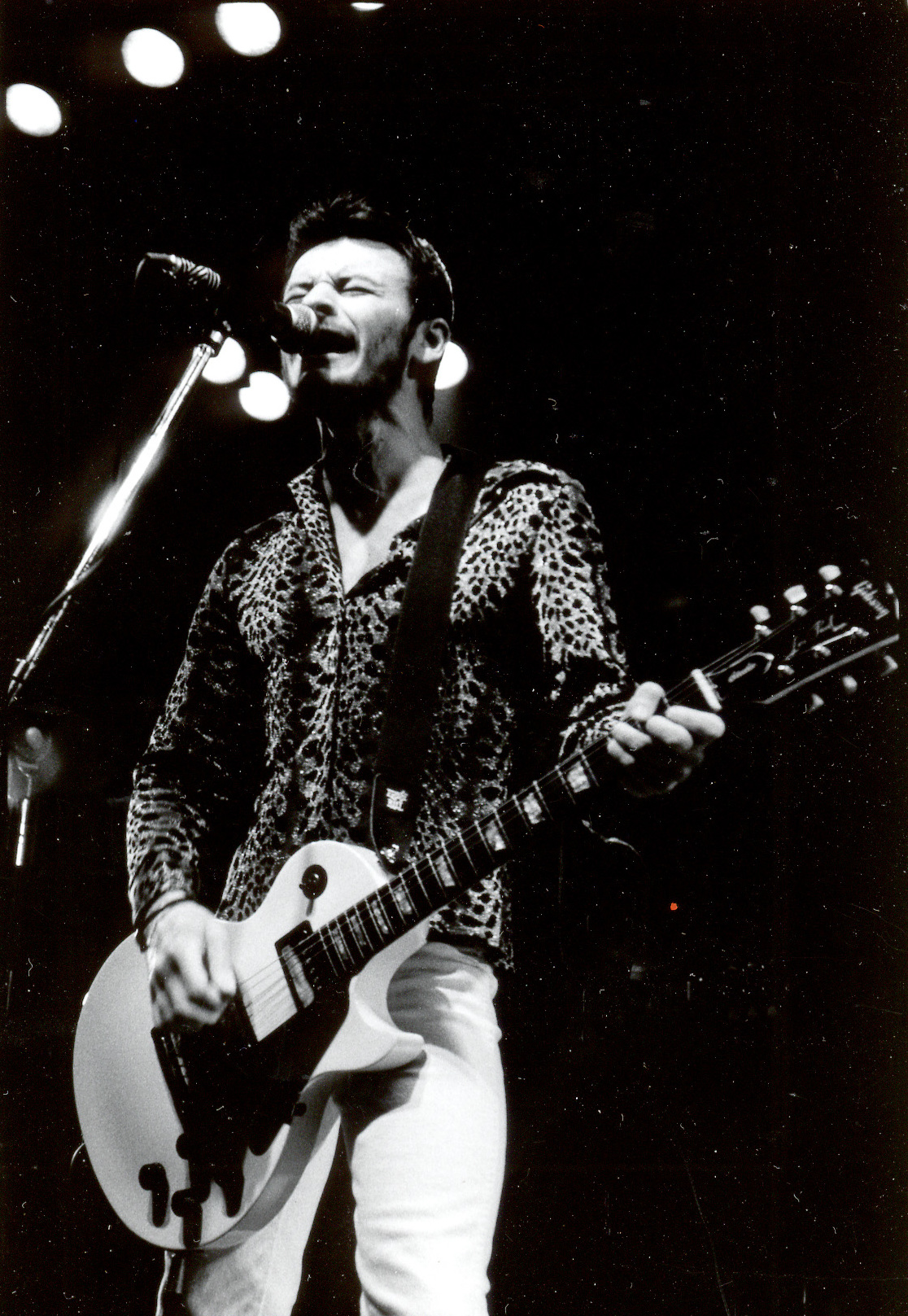
Bradfield performing in Chicago, April 1992

With the help of Hall or Nothing management, the Manics signed to indie label Heavenly Records. The band's first single for the label, "Motown Junk", released in January 1991, gave them their first chart appearance, reaching number 94 on the UK Singles Chart. Their next single, "You Love Us", opened with a sample of Krzysztof Penderecki's "Threnody to the Victims of Hiroshima", and closed with a sample of Iggy Pop's "Lust for Life". It was during this period that the band, particularly Wire and Edwards, began to adopt an androgynous/glam rock visual aesthetic.

On 15 May 1991, during an interview with then-NME journalist Steve Lamacq following a gig at Norwich Arts Centre, Edwards carved the phrase "4REAL" into his arm with a razor blade in a bid to prove the sincerity of the band. He was taken to hospital and received seventeen stitches. NME subsequently ran a full-page story on the incident, including an interview with Edwards on his motivations for doing it. A recording of the editorial meeting discussing whether or not they could publish the photo of Edwards displaying his cutting was included as a B-side on the band's 1992 charity single "Theme from M.A.S.H. (Suicide Is Painless)", under the title "Sleeping with the NME". The recording features Lamacq (the then-editor of NME), Danny Kelly, and James Brown (who went on to edit Loaded and the British version of GQ). As a result of their controversial behaviour, as well as their penchant for giving scathing critiques of other musicians (most infamously Wire's comments on R.E.M. singer Michael Stipe in 1992), the Manics quickly became favourites of the British music press, which helped them build a dedicated following.

In mid-1991, the band signed to Columbia Records/Sony Music UK Their debut album, Generation Terrorists, was released in 1992. The record generated six singles, including a re-recorded version of "You Love Us", and sold 250,000 copies. It reached number 13 in the UK Albums Chart. The liner notes contained a literary quote for each of the album's eighteen songs and the album lasted just over seventy minutes. The album's lyrics are politicised like those of the Clash and Public Enemy, with the songs regularly switching from a critical focus on global capitalism to more personal tales of despair and the struggles of youth. Other tracks combine personal and political themes; "Nat West-Barclays-Midlands-Lloyds" was written as a critique of overseas banking credit policies, but also concerned Edwards' issues involving overdrafts and refused loans. The single "Motorcycle Emptiness" criticises consumerism as a "shallow dream" that makes human life overtly commercialised. "Little Baby Nothing", a duet between Bradfield and former porn actress Traci Lords, was described by Priya Elan of NME as a "perfect snapshot of [female] innocence bodysnatched and twisted".

In an interview with Sylvia Patterson for the early April 1992 issue of Smash Hits, Richey Edwards summed up their "two philosophies of life" as "there must be more to life than this" and "it's all fucking bollocks".

In September 1992, the band released a cover of "Theme from M.A.S.H. (Suicide Is Painless)" as a charity single in aid of the National Spastics Society, now known as Scope. The single became the band's first Top 10 hit, peaking at number 7 in the UK. The group's second album, 1993's Gold Against the Soul, had a more grunge-influenced sound. It was released to mixed reviews but performed well, reaching number 8 in the UK. The album was produced by Dave Eringa, who had already been an associate of the band for several years. In subsequent years, the band have named Gold Against the Soul as their least favourite album, and have described the period surrounding the album as being the most unfocused of their career. Bradfield said: "All we wanted to do was go under the corporate wing. We thought we could ignore it but you do get affected."

By early 1994, Edwards' mental and physical health difficulties, including anorexia, alcohol abuse, depression and self-harm, became worse. In April and May, the band played concerts in Thailand and Portugal and at a benefit concert for the Anti-Nazi League at Brockwell Park, London. Edwards was habitually cutting himself, and appeared onstage in Bangkok with self-inflicted wounds across his chest. Following their appearance at the Glastonbury Festival in June (during which, Wire called Glastonbury a "shithole" and suggested to "build a few more fucking bypasses" over it), Edwards was admitted into The Priory, and the band played a few festivals as a three-piece to pay for his treatment. These appearances included T in the Park in Scotland, the Alte Wartesaal in Cologne, the Parkpop Festival in The Hague and the Reading Festival. During the Reading show, Bradfield played Edwards' black Gibson Les Paul Studio as a mark of respect (although Bradfield later commented that he regretted playing Edwards' guitar).

The band's third album, The Holy Bible, was released in August 1994. It received critical acclaim, but sold poorly. The album displayed yet another musical change for the band, marking a shift from the modern rock sound of their first two albums towards alternative rock. The album also incorporates various elements from other musical genres, such as hard rock, British punk, post-punk, new wave, industrial, art rock and gothic rock. Lyrically the album deals with subjects including prostitution, American consumerism, British imperialism, freedom of speech, the Holocaust, serial killers, the death penalty, political revolution, childhood, fascism and suicide. According to Q: "the tone of the album is by turns bleak, angry and resigned". There was also an element of autobiographic subjects, like in the song "4st 7lb" where the lyrics clearly tackle Richey's own experience with anorexia. The song was named after 4 stones 7 pounds, or 63 pounds (29 kg), because it is the weight below which death is purported to be medically unavoidable.

The title of The Holy Bible was chosen by Edwards to reflect an idea, according to Bradfield, that "everything on there has to be perfection". Interviewed at the end of 1994, Edwards said: "The way religions choose to speak their truth to the public has always been to beat them down [...] I think that if a Holy Bible is true, it should be about the way the world is and that's what I think my lyrics are about. [The album] doesn't pretend things don't exist". Although its initial sales were poor, The Holy Bible eventually sold over 600,000 copies worldwide.

The band changed their visual aesthetic during this period, away from androgynous glam and towards an army/military look. A now infamous appearance on Top of the Pops in June 1994, where the band performed "Faster", the first single from The Holy Bible, featured Bradfield wearing a "terrorist-style" balaclava. The band were told by the BBC that the performance had received the most complaints in the BBC's history to that point.

With Edwards out of hospital, the band spent late 1994 on a headline tour of the UK and Ireland and two tours in mainland Europe with Suede and Therapy?. In December, three nights at the London Astoria ended with the band smashing up their equipment and the venue's lighting rig, causing £26,000 worth of damage.

=== Disappearance of Richey Edwards (1995) ===
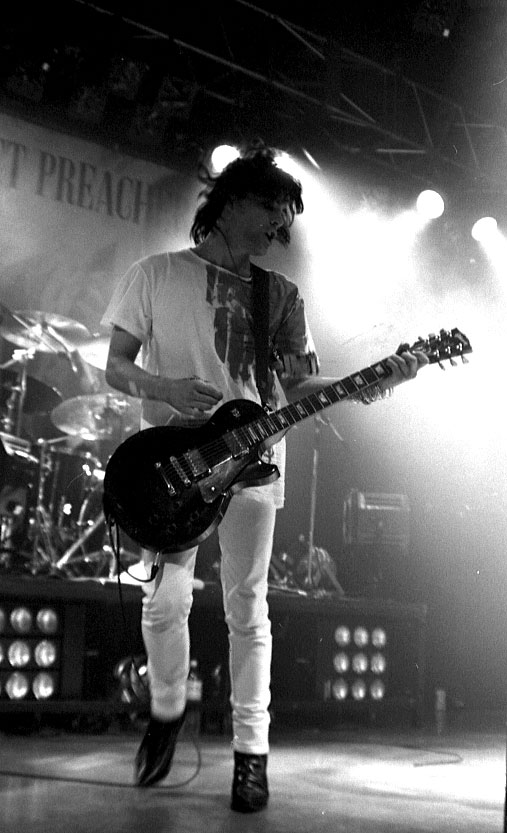
Edwards performing in Japan in May 1992

Edwards disappeared on 1 February 1995, on the day when he and Bradfield were due to fly to the US on a promotional tour. In the two weeks before his disappearance, Edwards withdrew £200 a day from his bank account, which totalled £2,800 by the day of the scheduled flight. He checked out of the Embassy Hotel in Bayswater Road, London, at seven in the morning, and then drove to his apartment in Cardiff, Wales. In the two weeks that followed he was apparently spotted in the Newport passport office, and the Newport bus station. On 7 February, a taxi driver from Newport supposedly picked up Edwards from the King's Hotel in Newport, and drove him around the valleys, including Blackwood (Edwards' home as a child). The passenger got off at the Severn View service station near Aust and paid the £68 fare in cash.

On 14 February, Edwards' Vauxhall Cavalier received a parking ticket at the Severn View service station and on 17 February, the vehicle was reported as abandoned. Police discovered the battery to be flat, with evidence that the car had been lived in. Due to the service station's proximity to the Severn Bridge (which has been a prominent suicide location in the past) it was widely believed that he took his own life by jumping from the bridge.

Manic Street Preachers were put on hold for six months and disbanding the group was seriously considered, but with the blessing of Edwards' family, the other members continued. Edwards was legally "presumed dead" in 2008, to enable his parents to administer his estate. The band continue to set up a microphone for Edwards at every live performance. The band's first release following Edwards' disappearance was a cover of "Raindrops Keep Fallin' on My Head" for the various artists charity album The Help Album, issued in September 1995 in aid of War Child.

=== Everything Must Go to Lifeblood (1996–2006) ===
The first album without Edwards, Everything Must Go, was released on 20 May 1996. The band had chosen to work with new producer Mike Hedges, mainly for his work on Siouxsie and the Banshees' single "Swimming Horses" that Bradfield rated highly. Everything Must Go debuted on the UK Albums Chart at number 2. So far the album has gone Triple Platinum in the UK and is their most successful album to date, spending 103 weeks in the Top 100 with the album still in the top five a year after its release. Featuring five songs either written or co-written by Edwards, the album was released to overwhelmingly positive reviews. The number 2 hit single "A Design for Life" was the first song to be written by the band following Edwards' disappearance. Bradfield later recalled that the lyric had been a fusion of two sets of lyrics - "Design for Life" and "Pure Motive" - sent to him from Wales by Wire, while he was living in Shepherd's Bush. The band later stated that writing the song "rescued" them from the despair they felt in the aftermath of Edwards' disappearance, with Wire describing the song as "a bolt of light from a severely dark place". "A Design for Life" was followed by three more hit singles from the album, "Everything Must Go", "Kevin Carter" (one of the five songs with a writing credit to Edwards) and "Australia".

Everything Must Go was shortlisted for the 1996 Mercury Prize award for best album, and won the band two awards at the 1997 Brit Awards, for Best British Band and Best British Album. The album has sold over two million copies around the world, is still considered one of the finest albums of the 1990s, and frequently voted in polls in the category of best albums of all time by many publications. The success of Everything Must Go at the Brit Awards ensured that sales of their previous albums - Generation Terrorists, Gold Against the Soul and The Holy Bible - enjoyed a late surge (Generation Terrorists sold an extra 110,000 copies).

In 1997, the band performed a special gig at the Manchester Arena for more than 20,000 people. Wire said that was the moment he knew that the band had "made it". The recording was released on VHS on 29 September 1997.

The band's fifth album, 1998's This Is My Truth Tell Me Yours, was their first number 1 in the UK, remaining at the top of the albums chart for three weeks, selling 136,000 copies in the first week and spending a total of 74 weeks in the chart. The title is a quotation taken from a speech given by Aneurin Bevan, a Labour Party politician from Wales. The cover photograph was taken on Black Rock Sands near Porthmadog, Wales. The album also peaked at number 1 in Sweden and Ireland.

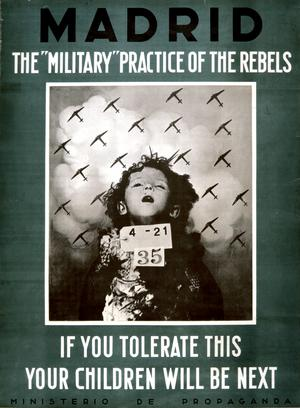
The "If You Tolerate This Your Children Will Be Next" poster

The album spawned the band's first number 1 single, "If You Tolerate This Your Children Will Be Next". The song's theme is taken from the Spanish Civil War, and the idealism of Welsh volunteers who joined the left-wing International Brigades fighting for the Spanish Republic against Francisco Franco's military rebels. The song takes its name from a Republican poster of the time, displaying a photograph of a young child killed by the Nationalists under a sky of bombers with the stark warning "If you tolerate this, your children will be next" written at the bottom. The song is in the Guinness World Records as the number 1 single with the longest title without brackets. The album also included three more hit singles, "The Everlasting", "You Stole the Sun from My Heart" and "Tsunami". As with the 1997 Brit Awards, the Manics won both Best British Band and Album at the 1999 Brit Awards. This Is My Truth Tell Me Yours was also shortlisted for the 1999 Mercury Prize and the band received a further nomination in the category of Best UK & Ireland Act in the 1999 MTV Europe Music Awards, where they performed "If You Tolerate This Your Children Will Be Next". At the NME Awards in 1999, the band won every major award (Best Band, Best Album, Best Live Act, Best Single and Best Video). They also won the Best Band in the World Today award at the 1998 Q Awards.

After headlining Glastonbury Festival, T in the Park and V Festival, the band played the Leaving the 20th Century concert at the Millennium Stadium in Cardiff on 31 December 1999, the first concert to be held there, with 57,000 people attending and the final song being broadcast around the world by satellite as part of 2000 Today. The concert was released on VHS and DVD as Leaving the 20th Century.

In 2000, they released the limited edition single "The Masses Against the Classes". Despite receiving little promotion, the single sold 76,000 copies in its first week and reached number 1 in the UK singles chart on 16 January 2000, beating "U Know What's Up" by Donell Jones to the top. The single was deleted on the day of release, but the song nevertheless spent nine weeks in the UK chart.

In 2001, they became the first popular Western rock band to play in Cuba (at the Karl Marx Theatre) and met with President Fidel Castro. Their concert and trip to Cuba was documented and then released on DVD as Louder Than War. At this concert, they revealed many tracks from their upcoming sixth album, Know Your Enemy, which was released on 19 March 2001. The left-wing political convictions of Manic Street Preachers are apparent in many of the album's songs, such as "Baby Elián" as they comment on the strained relations between the United States and Cuba as seen in the Elián González affair, a hot topic around the album's release. The band also pays tribute to singer and civil rights activist Paul Robeson in the song "Let Robeson Sing", which was issued as the album's fourth and final single. One non-political song on the album is "Ocean Spray", the album's third single, which was written entirely by Bradfield about his mother's battle with cancer. The first two singles from the album, "So Why So Sad" and "Found That Soul", were both released on the same day. The Manics headlined the 2001 Reading and Leeds Festival.

A greatest hits album, Forever Delayed, was released in 2002, featuring two new songs, "Door to the River" and the single "There by the Grace of God". A 2-CD 'Special Edition' was also issued, featuring a bonus CD of remixes. Forever Delayed debuted and peaked on the UK chart at number 4. A DVD collection of the band's promo videos and a photo book, both also titled Forever Delayed, were released at the same time.

Lipstick Traces (A Secret History of Manic Street Preachers), a compilation album of B-sides, rarities, and cover versions was released in 2003, which includes the previously unreleased "Judge Yr'self", the last song the band recorded with Edwards. The album received a far more positive reception from fans than the Forever Delayed greatest hits album, which was heavily criticised for focusing the band's more commercial side. The only recurring criticism of Lipstick Traces was the exclusion of the fan favourite "Patrick Bateman", a B-side of "La Tristesse Durera (Scream to a Sigh)", the second single from 1993's Gold Against the Soul. The band explained that it was excluded mainly because it was almost seven minutes long and simply would not fit on the album.

The band's seventh studio album, Lifeblood, was released on 1 November 2004 and reached number 13 on the UK album chart, becoming their first studio album since their debut, Generation Terrorists, to miss the UK Top 10. Critical response to the album was mixed. The album was more introspective and more focused on the past. Wire talked about the ghosts that haunted this record and stated that the record was a retrospective: "The main themes are death and solitude and ghosts. Being haunted by history and being haunted by your own past. Sleep is beautiful for me. I hate dreaming because it ruins ten hours of bliss. I had a lot of bad dreams when Richey first disappeared. Not ugly dreams, but nagging things. Until we wrote 'Design for Life', it was six months of misery. Lifeblood doesn't seek to exorcise Edwards' ghost, though, just admits that there are no answers". Tony Visconti helped the band produce three songs on the album, which was followed by a UK arena tour in December 2004. "The Love of Richard Nixon" and "Empty Souls" were the two singles released from the album, both reaching number 2 in the UK.

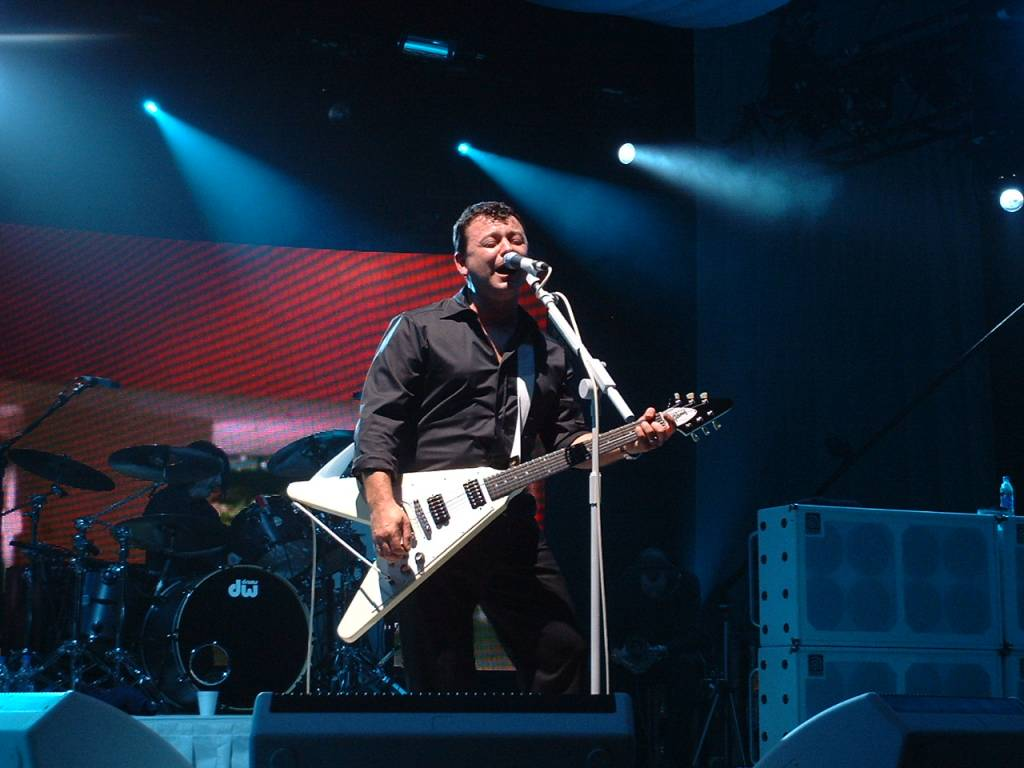
Manic Street Preachers live in Brighton in 2004

A 10th Anniversary Edition of The Holy Bible was released on 6 December 2004, which included a digitally remastered version of the original album, a rare US mix (which the band themselves have admitted to preferring to the original UK mix) and a DVD of live performances and extras including a new band interview.

In April 2005, the band played several shows as the Past-Present-Future tour, announced as their last for at least two years. The band released an EP entitled God Save the Manics with only a limited number of copies available and given out to fans as they arrived at the venue. After all the copies were gone, the band made the EP available as a free download on their website. In September, the band contributed the new track "Leviathan" to the War Child charity album Help!: A Day in the Life. The band received the prize for the Q Merit Award at the 2006 Q Awards.

A 10th Anniversary Edition of Everything Must Go was released on 6 November 2006. It included the original album, demos, B-sides, remixes, rehearsals and alternate takes of the album's songs, spread out over two CDs. An additional DVD, featuring promo videos, live performances, TV appearances, a 45-minute documentary on the making of the album, and two new films by Patrick Jones, completed the three-disc set. In the documentary, the band stated they were still very proud of the album, with Wire going further and saying, "I think it's our best record, I am not afraid to say that."

=== Send Away the Tigers to National Treasures (2007–2012) ===
The band's eighth studio album, Send Away the Tigers, was released on 7 May 2007. It entered the official UK Album Charts at number 2. Critical response to the album was largely positive, with some critics hailing the album as the band's best in a decade. A free download of a song entitled "Underdogs" from the album was made available through the group's website on 19 March 2007. The first official single released from the album was "Your Love Alone Is Not Enough", featuring Cardigans vocalist Nina Persson. According to Bradfield, the title was the last line of a suicide note left by the friend of someone close to the group. The second single, "Autumnsong", and a third, "Indian Summer", were released in August. "Indian Summer" peaked at number 22, making it the first Manics single not to chart in the Top 20 since 1994's "She Is Suffering". The album sleeve features a quotation from Wyndham Lewis: "When a man is young, he is usually a revolutionary of some kind. So here I am, speaking of my revolution".

A Christmas single, "The Ghost of Christmas", was released as a free download on the band's official website throughout December 2007 and January 2008. In February 2008, the band were presented with the God-Like Geniuses Award at the NME Awards ceremony.

The ninth Manics studio album, Journal for Plague Lovers, was released on 18 May 2009 and features lyrics left behind by Edwards. Wire commented in an interview that "there was a sense of responsibility to do his words justice." The album was released to positive critical reviews and reached number 3 on the UK Album Chart. However, the cover of the album generated some controversy, with the top four UK supermarkets stocking the CD in a plain slipcase, as the cover was deemed "inappropriate". Several tracks refer to Edwards' time in a couple of hospitals in 1994. Bradfield commented that Journal for Plague Lovers was an attempt to finally secure the legacy of Edwards and the result was that, during the recording process, it was as close to feeling his presence since his disappearance: "There was a sense of responsibility to do his words justice. That was part of the whole thing of letting enough time lapse. Once we actually got into the studio, it almost felt as if we were a full band; it [was] as close to him being in the room again as possible."

The band's tenth studio album, 2010's Postcards from a Young Man, was recorded with producer Dave Eringa and was mixed in America by Chris Lord-Alge. The album cover art uses a black and white photograph of British actor Tim Roth. The first single from the album, "(It's Not War) Just the End of Love", was released on 13 September 2010. The album was supported by the Manics' most extensive tour of the UK to date, starting in Glasgow on 29 September 2010. British Sea Power were the support act for the band on the tour. Two further singles were released from the album—"Some Kind of Nothingness", featuring Ian McCulloch of Echo & the Bunnymen, and the title track "Postcards from a Young Man". "Some Kind of Nothingness" peaked at number 44 in the UK, making it the first-ever Manics single to not make the Top 40 since they signed to Sony in 1991.

Manic Street Preachers playing live in 2010

The compilation album National Treasures – The Complete Singles was released on 31 October 2011; a cover version of the song "This Is the Day" by the The was released six weeks earlier as a single and was included on the album. The album was chosen by NME magazine as the best reissue of 2011, beating Nirvana's deluxe and super deluxe edition of Nevermind to the top spot. On 17 December 2011, the group performed 'A Night of National Treasures' at O_{2} Arena in London to celebrate the band's 25 years to date, and enter into a period of hiatus where the eleventh studio album was written. The band performed all 38 singles, with around 20,000 people in attendance, as well as guest performers including Nina Persson from the Cardigans on "Your Love Alone Is Not Enough" and Gruff Rhys from Super Furry Animals on "Let Robeson Sing". In April and May 2012, the band embarked on a European greatest hits tour.

A documentary about their album Generation Terrorists was screened on Saturday 20 October 2012 at Chapter Arts Centre as part of the Sŵn Festival, with all profits donated to Young Promoters Network. The film was made available in the 20th Anniversary Edition of Generation Terrorists, issued in November.

=== Rewind the Film and Futurology (2013–2016) ===
In May 2013, the band announced an Australasian tour for June and July, that would see them play their first-ever show in New Zealand. This tour coincided with the British and Irish Lions rugby tour to Australia and the Melbourne concert on the eve of the 2nd Test featured Lions' centre Jamie Roberts as a guest guitarist on "You Love Us".

In May 2013 the Manics released information about their most recent recording sessions, saying that they had enough material for two albums; the first would be almost exclusively without electric guitars. The name of the first album and title track was revealed to be Rewind the Film on 8 July. In a statement, the band announced, "(If) this record has a relation in the Manics back catalogue, it's probably the sedate coming of age that was This Is My Truth Tell Me Yours." The band also stated via Twitter, "MSP were in the great Hansa Studios in January with Alex Silva (who recorded The Holy Bible with us). Berlin was inspirational... Sean been playing a french horn in the studio today—sounding wonderful." The lead single of the album, "Show Me the Wonder", was released on 9 September 2013 to a positive critical reception. The album itself was released on 16 September 2013 and reached number 4 on the UK Albums Chart. The second single from the album, "Anthem for a Lost Cause", was released on 25 November 2013.

The other album, Futurology, the band's twelfth studio album, was released on 7 July 2014 and it received immediate critical acclaim. The lead single from the album, "Walk Me to the Bridge", was released as a digital download on the day of the announcement, on 28 April. The album sold about 20,000 copies in its first week and reached number 2 in the UK. The title track, "Futurology", was the second and final single released from the album on 22 September, with the video debuted on YouTube on 10 August. The video was directed by the British Academy of Film and Television Arts winner Kieran Evans, who worked with the band on videos from Rewind the Film. The band promoted the album with a tour around the UK and Europe from March to May 2014, they also made appearances in festivals like T in the Park in Scotland and Glastonbury Festival in the summer.

In December 2014, the band toured The Holy Bible, playing it in full for the very first time, to coincide with its 20th anniversary reissue. After the tour in the UK, the Manics took The Holy Bible tour to North America, in April 2015, they played in Washington DC, Toronto, New York, Boston, San Francisco, Los Angeles and Chicago. They also played in the Cardiff Castle on 5 June 2015 with 10,000 fans attending the gig, it was broadcast nationwide by BBC Two Wales. At the 2015 NME Awards, the album won "Reissue of the Year".

In November 2015, Manic Street Preachers announced that they were going to celebrate the 20th anniversary of Everything Must Go, with their biggest headline show since 1999, in the Liberty Stadium, in Swansea on 28 May 2016, featuring special guests including Super Furry Animals. The album was performed in full, with Nicky Wire teasing "B-sides, rarities and curios, greatest hits and a few brand-new songs". Before the final show in Swansea the band played: Liverpool, Echo Arena (13 May), Birmingham, Genting Arena (14 May), London, Royal Albert Hall (16–17 May), Leeds, First Direct Arena (20 May) and Glasgow, the SSE Hydro (21 May). In early 2016, the band announced the European tour of Everything Must Go, they played across Europe, in Finland, Denmark, the Netherlands and Germany.

=== Wales national team song and Resistance Is Futile (2016–2019) ===
The band announced in March 2016 that they would be releasing a theme song for the Wales national team ahead of the UEFA Euro 2016 tournament in the summer, entitled "Together Stronger (C'mon Wales)". It was released on 20 May. Featuring a video with the band and the Welsh team, the Manics tweeted: "It's with great pride we can announce the Manics are providing the official Wales Euro 2016 song – 'Together Stronger (C'mon Wales)'". All profits from the song went to the Princes Gate Trust and Tenovus Cancer Care. On 8 July the band was at the Cardiff City Stadium to give a home welcome to the Wales football national team after they were knocked out of the UEFA Euro 2016 by Portugal in the semi-finals, the band played a few songs in the stadium including the official theme song "Together Stronger (C'mon Wales)". On the next night, 9 July, the Manics headlined a night at the Cornwall's Eden Project, and later the band managed to secure a new recording studio near Newport, Wales. The city's council ensured that only the band can use the studio, there would be an increase on-site parking and a series of soundproofing measures to ensure nearby properties aren't disturbed by noise. To end the summer, the Manics went on to headline another two festivals, Wasa Open Air in Finland in mid-August and in late August the Victorious Festival in Portsmouth. The band also received a nomination in the 25th British Academy Cymru Awards for the best live outside broadcast after their 2015 gig in the Cardiff Castle, celebrating the 20th anniversary of The Holy Bible.

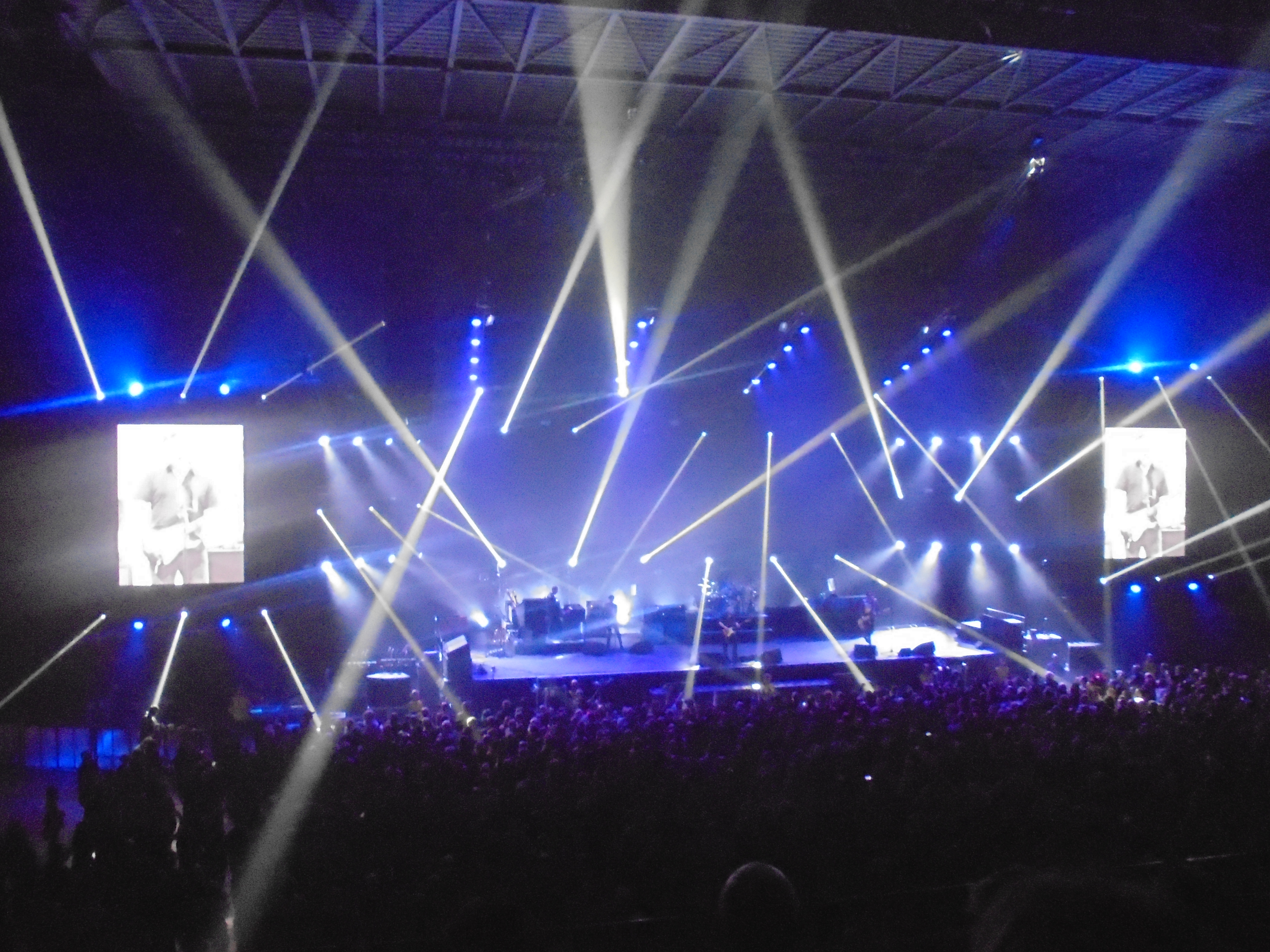
Manic Street Preachers at the First Direct Arena, Leeds in May 2018

In February 2017, the band revealed a teaser trailer for a documentary entitled Escape from History. The documentary aired on Sky Arts on 15 April. The band also stated that they would release an album later in that year.

The band released a 10th Anniversary Edition of Send Away the Tigers on 12 May 2017, with the Manics saying it was "a very important album" in their career. The special edition featured a remastered album as well as B-sides and rarities spread over two discs, plus a DVD which features the band's 2007 Glastonbury performance, rehearsal footage, an album track-by-track, and promo videos.

On 17 November 2017, the band announced that their thirteenth studio album, Resistance Is Futile, would be released on 13 April 2018. After much delay, the band wrote in a statement: "The main themes of Resistance Is Futile are memory and loss; forgotten history; confused reality and art as a hiding place and inspiration [...] It's obsessively melodic—in many ways referencing both the naive energy of Generation Terrorists and the orchestral sweep of Everything Must Go. After delay and difficulties getting started, the record has come together really quickly over the last few months through a surge of creativity and some old school hard work." It is the first album to be recorded at the "Door to the River" studio.

The Manics launched their first single from Resistance Is Futile, "International Blue", as a download on 8 December 2017. The second single "Distant Colours" was released, also as a download, on 16 February 2018. About the first single the band said that there was certain naive energy and widescreen melancholia on the song that is reflected through the whole album, comparing it to "Motorcycle Emptiness". Furthermore, the album focused on "(...)things that make your life feel a little bit better. Rather than my internalised misery, I tried to put a sense of optimism into the lyrics by writing about things that we find really inspiring." Said Wire, taking inspiration from David Bowie and seen as almost an escape and a wave of optimism, just like the previous album was described. On the other hand, "Distant Colours" was written by James Dean Bradfield, rather than Nicky Wire, and inspired by disenchantment and Nye Bevan's old Labour. He said: "Musically, the verse is downcast and melancholic and the chorus is an explosion of disillusionment and tears." The third single "Dylan & Caitlin" was released as a download on 9 March 2018. The fourth single "Liverpool Revisited" is about a magical day in the city, Nicky added that: "It was on the Everything Must Go (anniversary) tour and I got up really early at sunrise to walk around Liverpool, polaroid camera in hand on a balmy day. It sounds clichéd I know, but Liverpool in the sun does take on a hypnotic quality, with the Mersey and the stone." The band also revealed that they were to support Guns N' Roses during their summer tour. The fifth and final single, "Hold Me Like a Heaven", was released as a download on 4 May 2018. Wire said that the song was inspired musically by David Bowie's "Ashes to Ashes", something that the band wanted to write about, and Nicky thinks that this the closest that the band is going to get, sharing also that lyrics were informed by the work of Philip Larkin.

The album sold around 24,000 copies in the first week, entering the UK Albums Chart at number 2, despite being number 1 during the week. It was the highest new entry on the chart, and on physical sales the album peaked at number 1, both on CD and vinyl.

In January 2018, Manic Street Preachers signed a publishing contract with Warner/Chappell Music, leaving their longtime home Sony/ATV Music Publishing. The band announced a 20th Anniversary Edition of This Is My Truth Tell Me Yours in October 2018. It was made available on digital, CD, and vinyl, with the CD edition featuring bonus demos, live rehearsal recordings, remixes, and B-sides. The album was launched on 7 December 2018 and to promote it, the band went on tour in Spring and Summer 2019, performing the album in full alongside other content.

=== The Ultra Vivid Lament and Critical Thinking (2020–present) ===
In March 2020, the Manics announced a deluxe reissue of Gold Against the Soul for release on 12 June 2020. Bonus content included previously unreleased demos, B-sides from the era, remixes, and a live recording, while the CD was released alongside a book of unseen photographs from the era with handwritten annotations and lyrics from the band. The next day, the unnamed follow-up album to Resistance Is Futile was confirmed to NME alongside Bradfield's second solo album. The group's album, including a track called "Orwellian", was described as "expansive" and is due for release in Summer 2021. On 14 May 2021, the Manics announced the title of their fourteenth studio album as The Ultra Vivid Lament. The first single from the album, "Orwellian", was released on the same day. "The Secret He Had Missed", the second single from the album, was released on 16 July 2021. The Ultra Vivid Lament was released on 10 September 2021 and received generally positive reviews from critics: on Metacritic, the album has a weighted average score of 78 out of 100 based on 12 reviews, indicating "generally favorable reviews". The album sold 27,000 copies in the first week, granting the band their second UK number 1 album, as they narrowly beat Steps to the top spot.

In May and June 2022, Manic Street Preachers opened for the Killers in some of their UK tour dates. In September 2022, the Manics announced a co-headlining tour of United States and Canada with Suede for November 2022, which would be the first time the two bands would share the stage since they toured Europe together in 1994.

On 24 June 2023, the band played the Glastonbury Festival. Speaking to the Other Stage crowd, Wire said: "The first time we played was 1994 and it was the four of us, we had the one and only Richard Edwards with us, oh yes, we had a f**king blast. Everything that could go wrong did go wrong, it was f**king fun you know." All four band members were honoured with a mural in their hometown of Blackwood in April 2024, designed by street artist Paul Shepherd.

On 29 August 2024, Manics released "Decline and Fall", the lead single for their fifteenth studio album, Critical Thinking, which was announced in October that year. Critical Thinking was initially announced to be released on 7 February 2025, but was postponed due to production delays. On 31 January 2025, preceding the release of Critical Thinking, an extended play was released, titled Brushstrokes of Reunion, comprising the songs "Brushstrokes of Reunion", "People Ruin Paintings", "Hiding in Plain Sight" and "Decline and Fall" from Critical Thinking. The album was released on 14 February 2025 and reached number 2 on the Official UK album chart. The release coincides with the 30th anniversary of Richey Edwards' disappearance.

In a February 2025 interview with NME, Wire and Bradfield stated they were considering making their sixteenth album European themed.

== Collaborations and covers ==
Manic Street Preachers performing live in Brixton O2 Academy, 2014

The band released a split single in 1992 with the Fatima Mansions, a rock cover of "Suicide Is Painless", which became their first UK Top 10 hit. They have recorded many cover versions of songs by other artists, primarily as B-sides for their own singles. Bands and artists to whom the group have paid tribute in this way include the Clash, Guns N' Roses, Alice Cooper, Happy Mondays, McCarthy, Chuck Berry, Faces and Nirvana.

The band's first musical appearance since Edwards' departure was recording a cover of "Raindrops Keep Fallin' on My Head" for The Help Album, a charity effort in 1995 in support of aid efforts in war-torn Bosnia and Herzegovina.

The Lightning Seeds' song "Waiting for Today to Happen", from their fifth album, Dizzy Heights (1996), was written by Nicky Wire and Ian Broudie. That same year, James Dean Bradfield and Dave Eringa produced Northern Uproar's first single, "Rollercoaster/Rough Boys". The 808 State song "Lopez" (1997) features lyrics by Wire and vocals by Bradfield. It is featured on their greatest hits album, 808:88:98. Kylie Minogue's sixth album, Impossible Princess (1997), features two songs co-written and produced by the Manics: "Some Kind of Bliss" (Bradfield, Minogue and Sean Moore) and "I Don't Need Anyone" (Bradfield, Jones and Minogue) were produced by Bradfield and Dave Eringa. Bradfield provided backing vocals, bass guitar and production for the Massive Attack song "Inertia Creeps" (1998), which features on their successful third album, Mezzanine. Patrick Jones's album of poetry set to music, Commemoration and Amnesia (1999), features two songs with music written by Bradfield: the title track and "The Guerilla Tapestry". Bradfield plays the guitar on both songs. Furthermore, the track "Hiraeth" features a section called "Spoken Word", in which Nicky Wire talks about Welsh identity.

In February 2006, the band contributed a cover version of "The Instrumental" to the album Still Unravished: A Tribute to the June Brides.

In February 2008, the Manics covered Rihanna's hit pop song "Umbrella". Their version appeared on a CD titled NME Awards 2008 given away free with a special souvenir box-set issue of NME magazine, which went on sale 27 February. Additionally, the Manics' version of the song was made available on iTunes from 5 March 2008. Despite being chart-eligible (it reached number 47 in the UK), the release was not intended as an official single. Two further versions (the Acoustic and Grand Slam mixes) were later made available on iTunes.

James Dean Bradfield and Nicky Wire contributed an original song, "The Girl from Tiger Bay", to Shirley Bassey's 2009 studio album, The Performance.

== Musical style and influences ==
Manic Street Preachers' music has been variously described as alternative rock, hard rock, glam rock, pop rock, punk metal, and punk rock. Alluding to the band's early relationship with Britpop, Cam Lindsay of the Canadian music publication Exclaim! wrote that "while Britpop was rising, the Manics were offering the polar opposite: a bleak, uncompromising work (The Holy Bible) that wanted nothing to do with the party".

Though the band's first album, Generation Terrorists, was mostly politically charged glam rock mixed with punk influences, their style shifted towards a more commercial sound on Gold Against the Soul. When The Holy Bible was released, Manic Street Preachers had incorporated post-punk into their musical style, starting many songs on the album with either recordings of interviews or quotes, or guitar feedback and atonal rhythmic guitar parts. After Edwards' disappearance in 1995, the bands sound has become less dissonant and more appealing to a broader mainstream audience. Following albums have been described as string driven and slower-paced than their early work.

The band have stated that the Clash were "probably our biggest influence of all". When they saw them on television, "we thought it was fantastic and got really excited. They were the catalyst for us". Bradfield's guitar hero is John McGeoch of Magazine and Siouxsie and the Banshees: "He taught me, you can have that rock'n'roll swagger, but still build something into it that's really unsettling, and can cut like a razor blade". In addition, they have cited artists including Guns N' Roses, Alice in Chains, the Red Hot Chili Peppers, PiL, Skids, Gang of Four, Big Country, the Sex Pistols, Bruce Springsteen, the New York Dolls, Iggy Pop, Girls Against Boys, Anna Meredith, Wire, Julia Holter, Rush, Felt, and Simple Minds as influences on their music. ABBA, the Associates, Talk Talk, Roxy Music, R.E.M., Echo & the Bunnymen, and David Bowie were influences on the band's fourteenth album The Ultra Vivid Lament.

== Members ==
Current members

- James Dean Bradfield – lead and backing vocals, lead guitar, piano, keyboards (1986–present), rhythm guitar (1988–1989, 1995–present)
- Sean Moore – drums, percussion, trumpet, backing vocals (1986–present)
- Nicky Wire – bass, backing vocals (1986–present), rhythm guitar (1986–1988), keyboards, occasional lead vocals (1997–present)

Former members

- Miles "Flicker" Woodward – bass, backing and occasional lead vocals (1986–1988)
- Richey Edwards – rhythm guitar, backing vocals (1989–1995; disappeared in 1995; declared dead in absentia in 2008)

Current touring musicians

- Nick Nasmyth – keyboards (1995–2005, 2013–present)
- Wayne Murray (Thirteen:13) – lead and rhythm guitar, backing vocals (2006–present)
- Gavin Fitzjohn – rhythm and lead guitar, backing vocals (2018–present)

Former touring musicians

- Dave Eringa – keyboards (1993–1995, 2025)
- Greg Haver – rhythm and lead guitar, percussion, backing vocals (2002–2003)
- Anna Celmore – piano (2002–2003)
- Guy Massey – rhythm guitar (2004–2005)
- Sean Read – piano, keyboards, percussion, saxophone, backing vocals (2006–2012)
- Richard Beak – bass (2018)

== Discography ==
- Generation Terrorists (1992)
- Gold Against the Soul (1993)
- The Holy Bible (1994)
- Everything Must Go (1996)
- This Is My Truth Tell Me Yours (1998)
- Know Your Enemy (2001)
- Lifeblood (2004)
- Send Away the Tigers (2007)
- Journal for Plague Lovers (2009)
- Postcards from a Young Man (2010)
- Rewind the Film (2013)
- Futurology (2014)
- Resistance Is Futile (2018)
- The Ultra Vivid Lament (2021)
- Critical Thinking (2025)

== Awards and nominations ==
Best Art Vinyl Awards

The Best Art Vinyl Awards are yearly awards established in 2005 by Art Vinyl Ltd to celebrate the best album artwork of the past year.

Year	Nominee / work	Award	Result
2007	Send Away the Tigers	Best Vinyl Art	Nominated

BRIT Awards

The BRIT Awards is an annual music award show in the United Kingdom.

Year	Nominee / work	Award	Result
1997	Everything Must Go	British Album of the Year	Won
1997	"A Design for Life"	British Single of the Year	Nominated
1997	"A Design for Life"	British Video of the Year	Nominated
1997	Manic Street Preachers	British Group	Won
1999	This Is My Truth Tell Me Yours	British Album of the Year	Won
1999	"If You Tolerate This Your Children Will Be Next"	British Single of the Year	Nominated
1999	Manic Street Preachers	British Group	Won
2000	"You Stole the Sun from My Heart"	British Single	Nominated

NME Awards

The NME Awards is an annual music award show in the United Kingdom.

Year	Nominee / work	Award	Result
1996	Manic Street Preachers	Best Band	Nominated
1997	Manic Street Preachers	Best Live Act	Won
1997	Everything Must Go	Best LP	Won
1997	"A Design for Life"	Best Track	Won
1998	Manic Street Preachers	Best Band	Nominated
1999	Manic Street Preachers	Best Band	Won
1999	This Is My Truth Tell Me Yours	Best Album	Won
1999	"If You Tolerate This Your Children Will Be Next"	Best Track	Won
1999	"If You Tolerate This Your Children Will Be Next"	Best Music Video	Won
2000	"A Design for Life"	Best Ever Single	Nominated
2000	The Holy Bible	Best Album Ever	Nominated
2000	Manic Street Preachers	Best Band Ever	Nominated
2000	Manic Street Preachers	Best Band	Nominated
2001	Manic Street Preachers	Best Rock Act	Nominated
2008	Manic Street Preachers	Godlike Genius Award	Won
2010	Journal for Plague Lovers	Best Album Artwork	Nominated
2012	National Treasures – The Complete Singles	Reissue of the Year	Nominated
2013	Generation Terrorists	Reissue of the Year	Nominated
2013	Manic Street Preachers	Best Fan Community	Nominated
2015	The Holy Bible	Reissue of the Year	Won

Q Awards

The Q Awards are the UK's annual music awards run by the music magazine Q.

Year	Nominee / work	Award	Result
1996	Everything Must Go	Best Album	Won
1998	Manic Street Preachers	Best Act in the World Today	Won
1999	Manic Street Preachers	Best Act in the World Today	Nominated
2000	Manic Street Preachers	Best Act in the World Today	Nominated
2001	Manic Street Preachers	Best Act in the World Today	Nominated
2001	Manic Street Preachers	Best Live Act	Won
2006	Manic Street Preachers	Merit Award	Won
2007	"Your Love Alone Is Not Enough"	Best Track	Won
2007	Send Away the Tigers	Best Album	Nominated
2011	Manic Street Preachers	Greatest Act of the Last 25 Years	Nominated
2012	Generation Terrorists	Classic Album	Won
2013	"Show Me the Wonder"	Best Video	Won
2014	Futurology	Best Album	Nominated
2017	Manic Street Preachers	Inspiration Award	Won

Žebřík Music Awards

Year	Nominee / work	Award	Result	Ref.
1998	Manic Street Preachers	Best International Group	Nominated	
1998	This Is My Truth Tell Me Yours	Best International Album	Nominated	
1998	"If You Tolerate This Your Children Will Be Next"	Best International Song	Nominated	

- 7th Best Band of All Time – 1999 NME Best Ever Category
- 7th Best Album of All Time (The Holy Bible) – 1999 NME Best Ever Category
- 8th Best Single of All Time (A Design For Life) – 1999 NME Best Ever Category
- The MOJO Maverick Award 2009
