= Self-Portrait. Between the Clock and the Bed. =

Painting by Edvard Munch

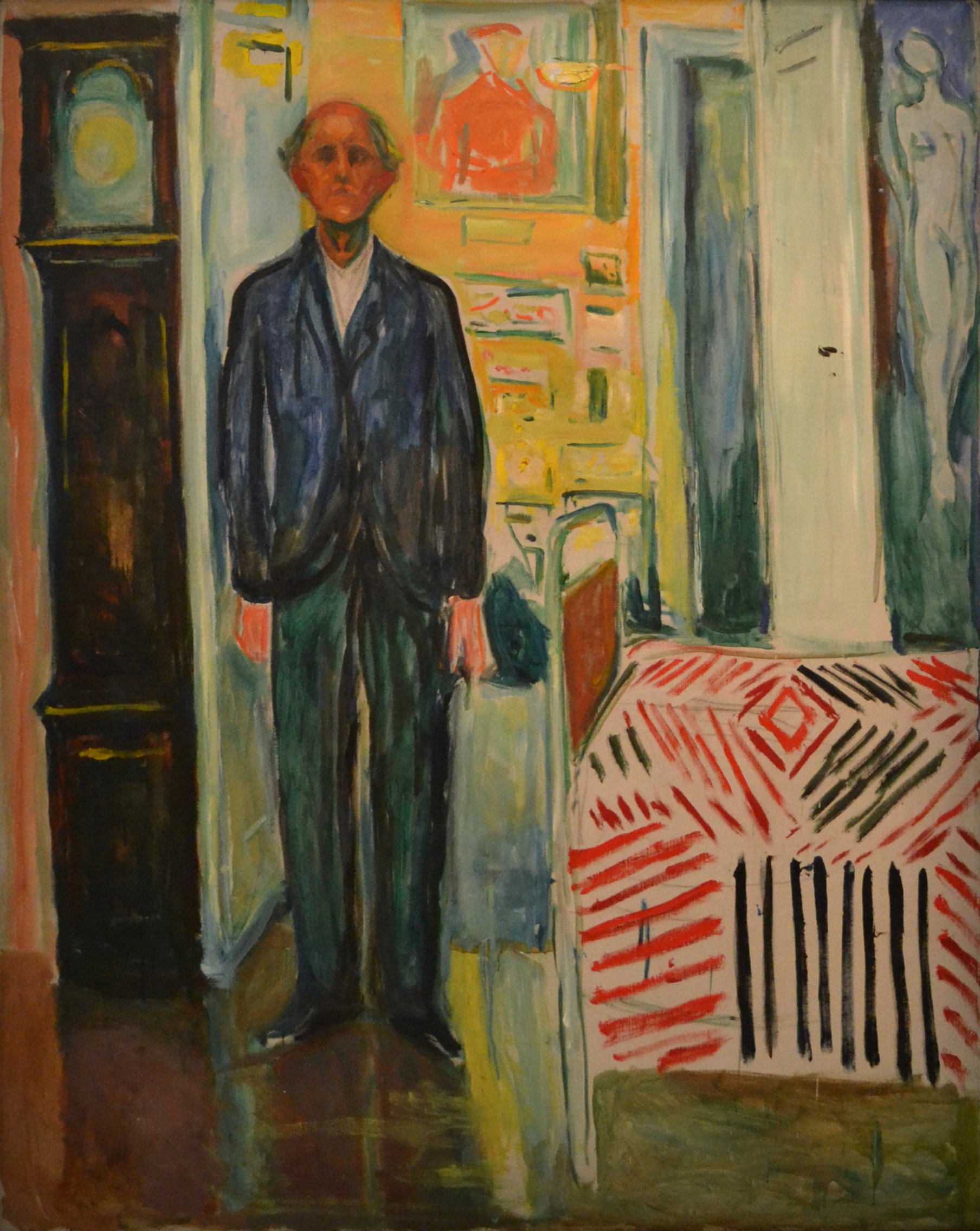
- Artist: Edvard Munch
- Year: 1940–1943
- Medium: oil on canvas
- Dimensions: 149.5 cm × 120.5 cm (58.9 in × 47.4 in)
- Location: Munch Museum, Oslo

Self-Portrait. Between the Clock and the Bed. is an oil on canvas self-portrait painting by Norwegian artist Edvard Munch, from 1940 to 1943. It is one of his last major works. Munch depicts himself as an unhappy, aging man, who appears frozen and flattened. Behind him is a bright yellow room full of light and past paintings, but he has placed his current self between a faceless grandfather clock and a bed, symbolising the inevitable passing of time and where he will eventually lie down for the final time.

== See also ==
- Self-portraiture
- List of paintings by Edvard Munch
