= Futurology (song) =

Song by Manic Street Preachers

Single by Manic Street Preachers

from the album Futurology
- Released: 22 September 2014
- Studio: Faster Studios, Cardiff, Wales; Hansa Studios, Berlin, Germany
- Genre: Alternative rock
- Length: 3:05
- Label: Columbia
- Songwriter(s): James Dean Bradfield, Nicky Wire, Sean Moore
- Producer(s): Loz Williams & Manic Street Preachers

Manic Street Preachers singles chronology
"Walk Me to the Bridge" (2014)	"Futurology" (2014)	"Together Stronger (C'mon Wales)" (2016)

Music video
- "Futurology" on YouTube

"Futurology" is the second single released by the Manic Street Preachers from their twelfth studio album, Futurology. The song features keyboards from Super Furry Animals member Cian Ciaran. The single was released on 22 September 2014. It is a duet between James Dean Bradfield, the main vocalist, and Nicky Wire, the band's bassist.

== Background ==
The song was first revealed at the Manic Street Preachers tour in the First Direct Arena on 28 March 2014, where the band debuted songs from their new album. On a track by track made by Gigwise the song was described as: "Brief bubbling space-age noises introduce the title track before a burst of Everything Must Go guitars kick off. The positive pine of Bradfield's vocal acts as an immediate sign that this is not going to be The Holy Bible pt II – or a continuation of any of their past work at all. While it may be a wonderfully typically Manics slice of arena rock, this track has a spirit to it that you've not heard from the band before."

According to the band, the song and lyrics were both written by Wire, and he said that the song, in a way, reflects the belief in humanity, where Wire has the faith that something positive will happen, thus the chorus: We'll come back one day, we never really went away (...).

The song, according to the band, came really naturally, and it was a critical aspect that pointed the positive vibe that the all record has, being one of the most optimistic records ever that the Manic Street Preachers have produced and released. The song was recorded in Hansa Studios in Berlin, like most of the album.

== Release ==
The song was made available by Digital download on Monday, 22 September, besides the single, it contains two extra songs, Antisocialmanifesto and Kodawari. It also featured a remix of Futurology made by R. Seiliog.

=== Music video ===
The music video directed by Kieran Evans was uploaded to the band's official VEVO account on YouTube on 10 August 2014.

== Track listing ==
Digital download
No.	Title	Length
1.	"Futurology"	3:05
2.	"Antisocialmanifesto"	3:01
3.	"Kodawari"	3:19
4.	"Futurology" (R. Seiliog Remix)	4:15

== Personnel ==
Manic Street Preachers

- James Dean Bradfield – lead vocals, guitar
- Nicky Wire – vocals, bass guitar
- Sean Moore – drums

Other personnel

- Loz Williams – production
- Cian Ciaran – keyboards
- Kieran Evans – music video
