= Futurology (album) =

Studio album by Manic Street Preachers
- Released: 7 July 2014
- Studios: Faster, Cardiff, Wales; Hansa Studios, Berlin, Germany
- Genres: Alternative rock; dance-rock; krautrock; new wave; post-punk
- Length: 47:05
- Label: Columbia
- Producers: Manic Street Preachers; Alex Silva; Loz Williams

Manic Street Preachers chronology
Rewind the Film (2013)	Futurology (2014)	Resistance Is Futile (2018)

Singles from Futurology
- 1. "Walk Me to the Bridge" Released: 28 April 2014; 2. "Futurology" Released: 22 September 2014

Futurology is the twelfth studio album by Welsh alternative rock band Manic Street Preachers, released on 7 July 2014 by Columbia Records. The album features collaborations with Green Gartside, Nina Hoss, Georgia Ruth, Cian Ciaran and Cate Le Bon.

Supported by two singles, "Walk Me to the Bridge" and the title track "Futurology", Futurology received acclaim from music critics, and was their highest-charting album since Send Away the Tigers, peaking and debuting at No. 2 on the UK Album Chart.

== Writing and recording ==
Futurology was the Manics' second new album to be released in the space of a year, having been recorded alongside 2013's Rewind the Film, an album described by the group as being "gentle and delicate" in contrast to the icy, multi-layered and angular Futurology. The album was recorded in Germany with Alex Silva, with whom the band worked on The Holy Bible in 1994, and at Faster Studios, Wales. The album was described to be inspired by modern art and the sense of motion that the band experienced touring the heart of Europe in 2011 in support of National Treasures – The Complete Singles.

About the European inspiration that took over the band in the new record, singer and guitarist James Dean Bradfield stated that: "We started touring mainland Europe in late '91 so obviously we've seen Belfast change in front of our eyes, we've seen Berlin change unbelievably and parts of Belgium... every city in Britain we've seen change. I'd never been abroad before I was in a band, actually, I'd been abroad once, I'd been to Bristol."

Bradfield also tackled the subject of the many guest that have appeared on the last two Manic Street Preachers records, Rewind the Film and Futurology: "I'm 12 albums in - I know my voice can only do certain things, and if I can't take other people singing on the track then I really have got a Napoleon complex. I'm short enough to have one...".

Two songs from Futurology - "Europa Geht Durch Mich" and title track "Futurology" - were debuted on the first night of the 2014 UK Tour, at the First Direct Arena on 28 March 2014. A third one, "Let's Go to War", was first heard at the Brixton Academy, and described by bassist Nicky Wire as a "nice marching song". The track "Walk Me to the Bridge", and its accompanying music video, was released on 28 April 2014. In May 2014, the band released the video for "Europa Geht Durch Mich". The second single from the album, "Futurology", was released 22 September 2014.

The band themselves have stated that this album was very important for celebrating the 20th anniversary of their seminal album The Holy Bible because the band said that after releasing two critically acclaimed albums they now think it was the right time to celebrate the 20th anniversary of the album.

In an interview with Gigwise when asked what influence The Holy Bible had on Futurology, frontman and singer James Dean Bradfield replied: "That we could still trade in a language that is still exclusively ours, that we could still want to write songs that other people are just never going to go near. I just don't think that anyone else would go near that subject matter. We never laid claim to being the most 'original' band, but I think we're unique in that sense."

The Manic Street Preachers have also said that this album is the opposite of last year's Rewind the Film; Futurology, according to the band, is an album full of ideas and one of their most optimistic yet, as Wire said to the NME magazine in an interview: "There's an overriding concept behind Futurology which is to express all the inspiration we get from travel, music and art – all those ideas, do that in a positive way. Rewind the Film was a harrowing 45-year-old looking in the mirror, lyrically. Futurology was very much an album of ideas. It's one of our most optimistic records, the idea that any kind of art can transport you to a different universe."

The songs "Black Square" and "Mayakovsky" refer to Black Square and Vladimir Mayakovsky respectively, and were inspired by the pre-revolution avantgarde / futuristic art community in Imperial Russia. The song "Between the Clock and the Bed" was inspired by the Edvard Munch painting Self-Portrait. Between the Clock and the Bed. The song "Dreaming a City (Hughesovka)" is inspired the history of the Ukrainian city now known as Donetsk, founded in 1869 by Welsh businessman John Hughes, who operated a steel plant and several coal mines at what was then Aleksandrovka. The worker's settlement at the plant merged with Aleksandrovka and the place was named Yuzovo/Yuzove, later Yuzovka/Yuzivka, or "Hughesovka" after Hughes. In its early period, the city received immigrants from Wales, especially from the town of Merthyr Tydfil.

== Release ==
Futurology was released on 7 July 2014; it was released in standard and deluxe versions and also on vinyl.

The standard edition contains all the thirteen tracks of the album, while the deluxe version contains all the demos from thirteen songs from the record, plus three new tracks: "Blistered Mirrors", "Empty Motorcade" and "The Last Time I Saw Paris", which most of the lyrics are in French. In Japan the band released bonus tracks, which includes "Antisocialmanifesto" and "Kodawari", live versions from the O_{2} Arena performance were also available, "Ocean Spray" and "You Love Us" were the two songs featured on the Japanese version.

Futurology entered the Official Record Store Chart at number 1, outselling Ed Sheeran's x, and the official UK Album Chart at number 2, the highest new entry on the chart, selling approximately 20,000 copies in its first week.

The album remained in the Top 100 in the UK for 6 weeks (with 3 of those weeks in the Top 40), something that Rewind the Film didn't manage to do. The album reached number 8 in Ireland and also charted within the Top 40 in Finland, Germany, Greece, Czech Republic, Denmark and Japan. The album peaked and debuted at number 18 on the European Charts, for sales all over Europe, the album sold above 30.000 copies in the European mainland in the first week. Since it has been release the album has sold more than 50.000 copies in the UK.

The band promoted the album with a tour around the UK and Europe from March to May 2014, they also made appearances in festivals like T in the Park in Scotland and Glastonbury Festival in the summer.

"Futurology"
"Futurology" was the second single released from the album.

=== Singles ===
Two singles were released from the album: "Walk Me to the Bridge" was the first released on 28 April, it leaked prior to its release. The subject of the lyrics were questioned whether they were about the former band member Richey or not, but Wire said that he wrote the song at a critical time, when he was tired of being in the band, and he wrote the lyrics thinking of that subject.

The title track, "Futurology", was the second and final single released from the album on 22 September. The video debuted on YouTube on 10 August. The video was directed by the British Academy of Film and Television Arts winner Kieran Evans, who worked with the band on videos from their previous effort Rewind the Film.

== Musical style ==
Futurology has been described under genres such as alternative rock, post-punk, dance-rock, new wave and krautrock. Nicky Wire described the sound of the album as "post-punk disco-rock". Canadian music publication Exclaim! proclaimed Futurology's style a "radical vision", which encompassed a great collection of styles including the "Krautrock banger" "The Next Jet to Leave Moscow" and the "prog odyssey" "Mayakovsky".

== Reception ==
Professional ratings
Aggregate scores
Source	Rating
Metacritic	83/100
Review scores
Source	Rating
AllMusic	4.5/5 stars
Clash	8/10
Gigwise	9/10
The Guardian	4/5 stars
The Independent	4/5 stars
Mojo	4/5 stars
NME	8/10
PopMatters	8/10
Q	4/5 stars
The Telegraph	5/5 stars

Upon its release, Futurology received critical acclaim. At Metacritic, which assigns a normalized rating to reviews from mainstream critics, the album received an average score of 83 out of 100, based on 19 reviews, indicating "universal acclaim".

AllMusic critic Stephen Thomas Erlewine wrote: "They're more infatuated with Neu! and Kraftwerk or Public Image Ltd, but these jagged, difficult sounds are filtered through the trio's now instinctual arena-filling gestures and that tension is what gives Futurology a resonant richness." Gareth James of Clash magazine described the album as "Manics doing what they do best, with added krautrock, Georgia Ruth and Green Gartside."

Andrew Trendell of Gigwise wrote: "As a record that embraces the constant sense of movement and progress throughout Europe, it establishes the band themselves as artists in constant revolution." Alexis Petridis of The Guardian stated: "Futurology never feels like a pastiche, and sounds unmistakably like the Manic Street Preachers while sounding unlike any other album they've made."

The Independent critic Kevin Harley commented that "Elsewhere, the Manics' band identity proves robust enough to withstand the tweaking." Ben Hewitt of NME stated that "the Manics prove they are still the enemies of greed, conformity and corruption." The Telegraph declared: "...the dark pulse of that krautrock influence gives the songs a steely sleekness of purpose (and real cohesion), while the band layer a vigorous variety of sounds and tempos on top to keep things interesting." PopMatters associate music editor John Garratt wrote that the album "can just about stand toe-to-toe with any of their past albums."

Writing for The Quietus, Simon Price described the album as "bona fide, solid-as-granite masterpiece", stating: "Futurology is more than just that version of the Manics, and one of those albums."

Sputnikmusic staff reviewer Joseph Viney stated that the album "wraps up the ideals of what has come before it, mixed it with their present experience and forged ahead with songs that demonstrate a group with a lot more life in them yet."

MusicOMH awarded the album four out of five stars, saying that "[...] Futurology is full of glam-pop hits that demonstrate the Preachers' ability to write good songs with a distinct sense of Britishness", finishing with: "Futurology is a welcome return by Manic Street Preachers to the forefront of pop, featuring no lack of technical prowess or instrumental capabilities. Every track is quite full of life and holds no lack of energy that characterizes good, classic British rock 'n' roll. Despite past hardship, the future continues to be bright for these modern legends."

As of September 2021, the album had sold 52,829 copies in the UK.

=== Accolades ===
Futurology was a critical and commercial success, the album was presented with very positive reviews from music critics around the world and was well received by the fans. In the end of the year lists, the album achieved the following accolades:

- NME magazine stated that Futurology was the 41st best album of 2014.
- NME magazine also choose the title track "Futurology" as one of the best tracks of 2014.
- The Telegraph placed the album in number 38 in their list of 50 best albums of 2014.
- Mojo placed Futurology in number 20 in their 50 best albums of 2014.
- XFM placed the album in number 11 in their end of the year list.
- The Quietus placed Futurology in number 8 on their end of the year list for 2014.
- Q placed the album in number 4 on their list of 50 best albums of 2014.

Reflecting on the album XFM stated that Futurology was very different from their last year's effort: "After the acoustic experimentation of Rewind the Film, here's classic rabble rousing Manics, with massive choruses", while Q said that the album was "Exhilaratingly dense with new sounds" and it had " deas and conflicting emotions..." On the other hand, talking about the title track, NME stated that: "The title track serves as a manifesto for all that follows: a declaration of positivity to tee-up the rest of the LP and a reminder that right can trump wrong in the end. There's a bubbling urgency and vibrancy and vitality here that was lacking from Rewind the Film, and a chorus that's a mantra for belief in a greater good."

== Track listing ==
No.	Title	Length
1.	"Futurology"	3:05
2.	"Walk Me to the Bridge"	3:14
3.	"Let's Go to War"	2:58
4.	"The Next Jet to Leave Moscow" (feat. Cian Ciaran)	3:23
5.	"Europa Geht Durch Mich" (feat. Nina Hoss)	3:24
6.	"Divine Youth" (feat. Georgia Ruth)	3:22
7.	"Sex, Power, Love and Money"	3:13
8.	"Dreaming a City (Hughesovka)"	4:39
9.	"Black Square"	4:07
10.	"Between the Clock and the Bed" (feat. Green Gartside)	3:35
11.	"Misguided Missile"	4:19
12.	"The View from Stow Hill"	4:08
13.	"Mayakovsky"	3:38
Total length:		47:05

Japanese bonus tracks
No.	Title	Length
14.	"Antisocialmanifesto"	3:01
15.	"Kodawari"	3:20
16.	"Ocean Spray" (live at The O2)	4:35
17.	"You Love Us" (live at The O2)	3:31
Total length:		61:35

Deluxe Edition bonus disc
No.	Title	Length
1.	"Futurology" (demo)	3:03
2.	"Walk Me to the Bridge" (demo)	3:16
3.	"Let's Go to War" (demo)	1:51
4.	"The Next Jet to Leave Moscow" (demo)	3:05
5.	"Europa Geht Durch Mich" (demo)	3:22
6.	"Divine Youth" (demo)	3:09
7.	"Sex, Power, Love and Money" (demo)	3:14
8.	"Dreaming a City (Hughesovka)" (demo)	4:20
9.	"Black Square" (demo)	3:42
10.	"Between the Clock and the Bed" (demo)	3:30
11.	"Misguided Missile" (demo)	4:11
12.	"The View from Stow Hill" (demo)	4:08
13.	"Mayakovsky" (demo)	3:04
14.	"Blistered Mirrors"	2:51
15.	"Empty Motorcade"	3:57
16.	"The Last Time I Saw Paris"	4:04

== Personnel ==
Manic Street Preachers

- James Dean Bradfield – lead vocals, lead and acoustic guitar, drums, bass, keyboards, percussion, vision
- Sean Moore – drums, soundscapes, machines, guitar, sequencers, percussion, tympani, technology
- Nicky Wire – bass guitar, baritone guitar, electric & acoustic guitars, omnichord, vocals, drum programming, percussion, noise

Additional musicians

- Nina Hoss – co-lead vocals on "Europa Geht Durch Mich"
- Georgia Ruth – co-lead vocals and harp on "Divine Youth"
- Green Gartside – co-lead vocals on "Between the Clock and the Bed"
- Cate Le Bon – backing vocals on "Let's Go to War"
- Gavin Fitzjohn – backing vocals on "Let's Go to War"
- H. Hawkline – backing vocals on "Let's Go to War"
- Berliner Kneipenchor – choral vocals on "Misguided Missile"
- Cian Ciaran – keyboards on tracks 1 and 4
- Nick Naysmith – keyboards on tracks 4 and 6
- Loz Williams – keyboards on tracks 5, 6, 8, 10 and 11
- Rich Beak – tambourine on track 6

Technical personnel

- Loz Williams – production and engineering, except track 4
- Alex Silva – production and engineering on track 4; co-production on tracks 1, 9 and 11
- Tim Tautorat – engineering assistance on tracks 1, 4, 9 and 11
- Craig Silvey – mixing on tracks 1, 3, 5, 8, 9, 10 and 11
- Eduardo de la Paz Canel – mix assistance on tracks 1, 3, 5, 8, 9, 10 and 11
- Guy Massey – mixing on tracks 2, 4, 6, 7, 12 and 13
- Josh Tyrell – mix assistance on tracks 2, 4, 6, 7, 12 and 13
- Tim Young – mastering
- Catrine Val – cover image
- Alex Lake – photography
- Nicky Wire – art direction
- Farrow – design

== Charts ==
Chart performance for Futurology
Chart (2014)	Peak position
Belgian Albums (Ultratop Flanders)	57
Belgian Albums (Ultratop Wallonia)	112
Danish Albums (Hitlisten)	35
Dutch Albums (Album Top 100)	42
Finnish Albums (Suomen virallinen lista)	17
German Albums (Offizielle Top 100)	33
Greek Albums (IFPI)	30
Irish Albums (IRMA)	8
Italian Albums (FIMI)	96
Scottish Albums (Official Charts)	5
Spanish Albums (Promusicae)	50
Swiss Albums (Schweizer Hitparade)	51
UK Albums (Official Charts)	2
