= Jenny Saville =

British painter (born 1970)

Jenny Saville RA
- Born: Jennifer Anne Saville; 7 May 1970 (age 56); Cambridge, England
- Education: University of Cincinnati, Glasgow School of Art
- Known for: Painting
- Movement: Young British Artists
- Relatives: Liz Saville Roberts (cousin); Boo Saville (sister); Mark Saville (Uncle)
- Awards: Royal Academician (2007)

Jennifer Anne Saville RA (born 7 May 1970) is an English figurative painter and an original member of the Young British Artists (YBAs). Saville lives and works in Oxford, England, and is noted for her large-scale nudes of unconventional female subjects. Some credit her with originating a new method of painting the female nude for contemporary art.

Recurring figures depicted in her work range from mothers, children, transgender people, burn victims, and cosmetic surgery patients. Although her work subverts many beauty standards and is informed by contemporary feminist theory, she also often references art history in her paintings.

As of 2018, she is regarded as the "Most Expensive Living Female Artist" after her work Propped (1992) sold at Sotheby’s for £9.5 million (~US$11.7 million).

== Early life and education ==
Saville was born in Cambridge, England. For secondary school, she went to the Lilley and Stone School (now The Newark Academy) in Newark, Nottinghamshire.

From 1988 to 1992, Saville earned her Bachelor of Fine Arts (BFA) degree at the Glasgow School of Art. While studying there, she was awarded a six-month scholarship to the University of Cincinnati in 1991, where she enrolled in a course in women's studies.

== Career ==
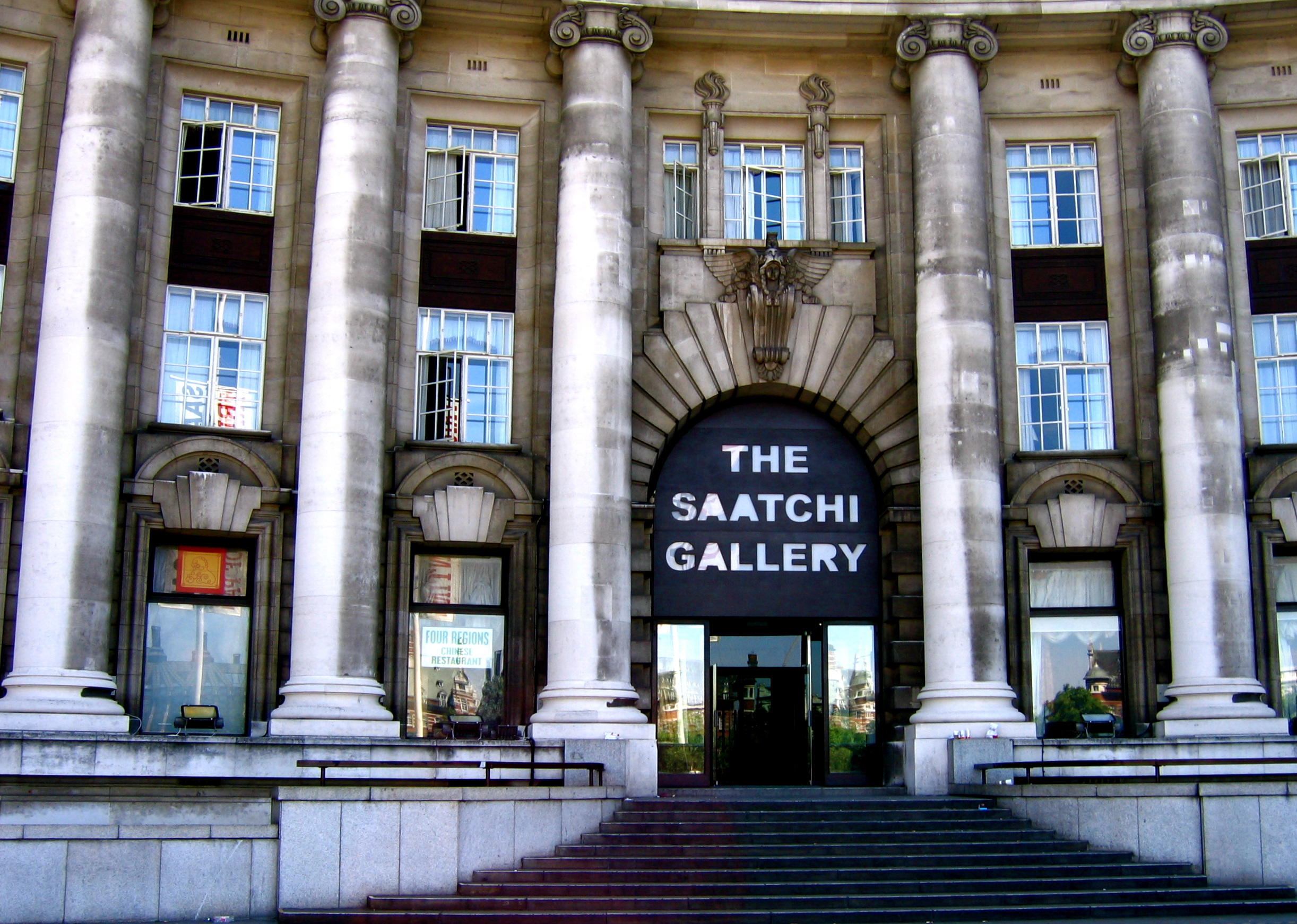
The Saatchi Gallery, London

Saville's early works included large-scale self-portraits and other portraiture. Since her debut in 1992, Saville's focus has remained on the female body, stating she is "drawn to bodies that emanate a sort of state of in-betweenness: hermaphrodite, a transvestite, a carcass, a half-alive/half-dead head."

Charles Saatchi offered Saville an 18-month contract, supporting her while she created new works to be exhibited at the Saatchi Gallery in London.

In 1994, the exhibition Young British Artists III displayed Saville's self-portrait, Plan (1993), as the signature piece. Saville is regarded as being part of the Young British Artists (YBAs).

Also n 1994, Saville observed plastic surgery operations in New York City. Her published sketches and documents include surgical photographs of liposuction, trauma victims, deformity correction, disease, and transgender patients. Much of her work features distorted flesh, while others show the marks of plastic surgery.

Between 1995 and 1996, Saville collaborated with photographer Glen Luchford to produce Closed Contact, a series of large photographic C-prints which depict Saville's nude body pressed up against a clear panel. The photographs were taken from underneath the glass and depict the female figure very distorted. The series explores femininity and the challenges the perception of the female body. The works were shown in 2002 at the Gagosian Gallery in Beverley Hills.

In 2004, Saville explored the idea of floating gender in her work Passage. Saville is quoted saying "With the transvestite I was searching for a body that was between genders. I had explored that idea a little in Matrix. The idea of floating gender is not fixed. The transvestite I worked with has a natural penis and false silicone breasts. Thirty or forty years ago this body couldn't have existed and I was looking for a kind of contemporary architecture of the body. I wanted to paint a visual passage through gender – a sort of gender landscape."

In 2018, Saville's Propped (1992) sold at Sotheby's in London for £9.5 million, well above its £3-£4 million estimate, becoming the most expensive work by a living female artist sold at auction. Saville's work Propped (1992) was described as "one of the undisputed masterpieces of the Young British Artists" by Sotheby's European head of Contemporary Art, Alex Branczik. This piece is said to be masterful because it is "the superlative self-portrait that shatters canonised representations of female beauty."

In 2023, Saville was one of two women (alongside Julie Mehretu) to have made the top 10 auction lots sold in that year.

== Work ==
=== Materials and technique ===
Saville is known for her use of large canvases, usually six by six feet (1.8 by 1.8 m) or more. She usually paints these by placing them on the floor and using brushes and extended tools to apply and manipulate paint, pushing, smearing, and scraping the pigment across the canvases.

Saville's work is also known for her use of strongly pigmented oil paint applied in heavy layers. Kenny Smith of the Scottish Field commented that Saville's layering of colours and techniques "capture a sense of motion and fluidity. These restless images provide no fixed point, but rather suggest the perception of simultaneous realities." Saville's technique creates a look that is visceral and fleshy, with the size of her paintings allowing the viewer to see the details and layering of her aesthetic of movement and abstract realism. Saville's "post-painterly style" has been compared to that of Lucian Freud and Rubens. Her work has also been compared to the gestural painting of Willem de Kooning in his Woman series.

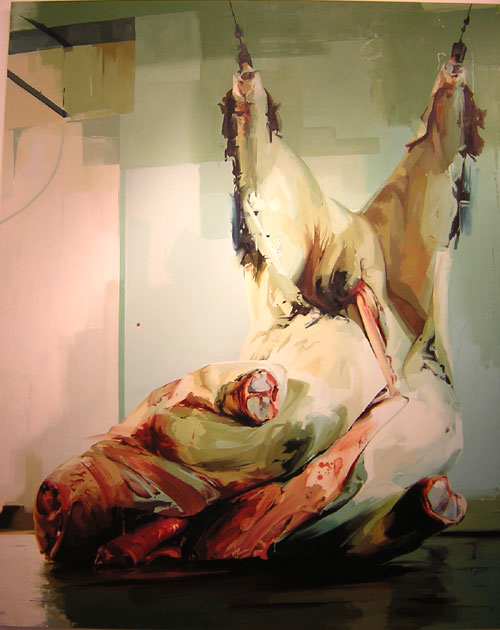
Torso (2004–2005), oil on canvas

Saville often uses small brushstrokes to build up the paint and soften the image. Using this technique, the finish of her paintings are matte without appearing "dry". She frequently uses muted colour combinations for her work to create a soft atmosphere that contrasts with her usually intense subject matter. In an interview for the Saatchi Gallery, Saville commented that she tries to create a balance between abstract and aesthetic effect and realistic depiction of the body in her work.

Saville also sometimes cuts into the layered paint on the canvas. In Plan (1993), which explores themes of plastic surgery, for example, she says "I didn't draw onto the body. I wanted the idea of cutting into the paint. Like you would cut into the body. It evokes the idea of surgery. It has lots of connotations."

In Saville's later works, she has used graphite, charcoal, and pastel to render overlapping figures. These works are reminiscent of traditional underdrawings and illustrate themes of movement, hybridity, and gender ambiguity. Saville states, "If I draw through previous bodily forms in an arbitrary or contradictory way...it gives the work a kind of life force or Eros. Destruction, regeneration, a cyclic rhythm of emerging forms".

=== Subject matter ===
The primary subject of Saville's works are the female nude and figuration, with the majority of all of Saville’s early works being the artist herself, and having almost exclusively painted female subjects since. Her works often "depict distorted, fleshy, and disquieting female bodies" to provoke the viewer. "I paint flesh because I'm human", she has said. "If you work in oil, as I do, it comes naturally. Flesh is just the most beautiful thing to paint."

Saville seeks to break down the social conventions that encourage women to fit into limiting beauty standards, having expressed issues regarding the prevalence of generally accepted standards of beauty: "A lot of women [are] made to fear their own excess, taken in by the cult of exercise, the great quest to be thin. The rhetoric used against obesity makes it sound far worse than alcohol or smoking, yet they can do you far more damage". In this vein she has also looked at plastic surgery in her work, for example, in Plan (1993), which shows the marks made on a body before having liposuction done.

Saville plays upon the "ambiguity of embodiment" and what it means to be "feminine" or "beautiful" through the use of the distortion and "disgust". Gallerist Asana Greenstreet commented that Saville performs "explorations of people that are both intimate and uncomfortable. Through detailed, frank and unapologetic investigations of the human body, dialogues occur between past and present, and are animated by questions of gender, suffering, and ambiguity." This "aesthetic of disgust" frequently pushes viewers to view and confront conceptions of women in Western society, giving some the autonomy to decide their own standard of beauty beyond this. Michelle Meagher writes that Saville sees standards of "beauty and pleasure [as] deeply embedded within Western [culture]", yet, she constantly tries to challenge these assumptions of the body and beauty. Scholars like Loren Erdrich argue there is a direct link between the physical body, identity, and the self presented within Saville's subjects. Suzie Mackenzie of The Guardian described Saville's work as frankly describing the disparity between the way women are perceived and the way that they feel about their bodies."

After having children, Saville's subjects and methods opened up, though still revolve around the depiction of bodies. Her references expanded to include motherhood, art history, and ancient myth. Saville’s work has been read as directed against the fantasy that humans can be the complete authors of their lives.

=== Influences ===
Saville partially credits her artistic interest in big bodies to the works of Pablo Picasso.

From the beginning of her career, Saville has engaged in the exploration of the body and its historical representation. Saville borrows conventions from a long tradition in figure painting, including using poses borrowed from Madonna and Child paintings by Leonardo da Vinci, as well as techniques associated with other male masters to create portraiture from a female point of view, and referencing a wide range of other art historical sources including antique and Hindu sculpture, to Renaissance drawing and painting, to the work of modern artists such as Henri Matisse, Willem de Kooning, and Pablo Picasso. Her views on beauty expand the traditional nude form into a way to comment on the body, gender politics, sexuality, and self-realisation.

Saville has created exhibitions of work directly inspired by historical artists and artworks. In 2016, her solo exhibition Jenny Saville Drawing: A Contemporary Response to Drawing in Venice, at the Ashmolean Museum in Oxford, was the final section of the Titian to Canaletto: Drawing in Venice exhibition, where twenty new works on paper and canvas were produced in response to the Venetian drawings in the exhibition. In the same year, her show Erota at London's Gagosian Gallery showed drawings also inspired by this exhibition.

== Awards ==
Saville has been nominated and awarded several honours and prizes including:

- 1990: John and Mabel Craig Award, Glasgow School of Art
- 1991: Scholarship, University of Cincinnati
- 1992: British Institution Award, Royal Academy of Arts, London
- 1992: The James Cumming Award, Royal Scottish Academy, Edinburgh
- 1992: The Newbery Medal, Glasgow School of Art
- 1993: Elizabeth Greenshields Foundation Award, Montreal, Canada
- 1995: Lord Provost’s Award for Contemporary Art, Glasgow, Scotland
- 1996: Elizabeth Greenshields Foundation Award, Montreal, Canada
- 2000: US Art Critics Association: Best Commercial Gallery Show (Gagosian), New York
- 2007: Elected a Royal Academician, Royal Academy of Arts, London

== Exhibitions ==
=== Solo ===
Year	Title	Venue	Location	Notes	Ref.
1999	Territories	Gagosian Gallery	New York		
2003	Migrants	Gagosian Gallery	New York		
2005	Jenny Saville	Museo d'Arte Contemporanea Roma	Rome		
2010	Jenny Saville: Reproduction Drawings	Gagosian Gallery	London	Works on paper	
2011	Continuum	Gagosian Gallery	New York		
2012	Jenny Saville	Norton Museum of Art	West Palm Beach, Florida	Part of Norton's RAW (Recognition of Art by Women) series	
2012	Jenny Saville	Modern Art Oxford	Oxford		
2014	Oxyrhynchus	Gagosian Gallery	London		
2016	Jenny Saville Drawing: A Contemporary Response to Drawing in Venice	Ashmolean Museum	Oxford	Drawings inspired by Titian to Canaletto: Drawing in Venice exhibition.	
2016	Erota	Gagosian Gallery	London	Drawings inspired by Titian to Canaletto: Drawing in Venice exhibition.	
2018	Ancestors	Gagosian Gallery	New York		
2018	Jenny Saville	George Economou Collection	Athens		
2020	Elpis	Gagosian Gallery	New York		
2021	Jenny Saville	Museo Novecento	Florence		
2021	Jenny Saville	Museo degli Innocenti	Florence		
2021	Jenny Saville	Museo di Casa Buonarroti	Florence		
2021	Jenny Saville	Museo di Palazzo Vecchio	Florence		
2021	Jenny Saville	Museo dell’Opera del Duomo	Florence		
2022	Latent	Gagosian Gallery	Paris		
2023	Ekkyklema	Gagosian Gallery	London		
2025	Jenny Saville: The Anatomy of Painting	National Portrait Gallery	London		
2025	Jenny Saville: The Anatomy of Painting	Modern Art Museum of Fort Worth	Fort Worth, Texas		
2025	Jenny Saville: Gaze	Albertina Museum	Albertina, Vienna		
2026	Jenny Saville a Ca’ Pesaro, 2026 Venice Biennale	International Gallery of Modern Art	Venice		

=== Group ===
Year	Title	Venue	Location	Notes	Ref.
1990	Van Gogh Self Portrait Competition	Burrell Collection	Glasgow		
1990	Contemporary View 90	Royal College of Art	London		
1990	BP Portrait Award Exhibition	National Portrait Gallery	London		
1991	BP Portrait Award Exhibition	National Portrait Gallery	London		
1992	RSA Students’ Exhibition 1992	Royal Scottish Academy	Edinburgh		
1992	New Generation	Compass Gallery	Glasgow		
1992	Critics’ Choice	Cooling Gallery	London		
1994	Young British Artists III	Saatchi Gallery	London		
1994	An American Passion: The Susan Kasen Summer and Robert D. Summer Collection of Contemporary British Painting	McLellan Galleries	Glasgow		
1994	An American Passion: The Susan Kasen Summer and Robert D. Summer Collection of Contemporary British Painting	Royal College of Art	London		
1995	The Continuing Tradition: 75 Years of Painting	Glasgow School of Art	Glasgow		
1996	Bad Blood	Glasgow Print Studio	Glasgow		
1996	Galleri Art-On		Halmstad, Sweden		
1996	Contemporary British Art '96	Kalmar Konstmuseum	Stockholm		
1996	A Collaboration	Pace/McGill Gallery	New York	In collaboration with Glen Luchford	
1997	Sensation	Royal Academy of Art	London		
1997	Sensation	Hamburger Bahnhof	Berlin		
1997	Sensation	Brooklyn Museum of Art	New York		
1997	From the Interior: Female Perspectives on Figuration	Ferens Gallery	Hull		
1997	From the Interior: Female Perspectives on Figuration	Kingston University	London		
1997	From the Interior: Female Perspectives on Figuration	Oldham Art Gallery	Oldham		
1997	From the Interior: Female Perspectives on Figuration	Derby Art Gallery	Derby		
1997	From the Interior: Female Perspectives on Figuration	University of Brighton Gallery	Brighton		
1997	From the Interior: Female Perspectives on Figuration	Hot Bath Gallery	Bath		
1997	British Figurative Art. Part 1: the Human Figure	Flowers East Gallery	London		
1998	Close Echoes—Public Bodies and Artificial Space	City Gallery	Prague		
1998	Close Echoes—Public Bodies and Artificial Space	Kunsthalle Krems	Austria		
1998	Extensions: Aspects of the Figure	Joseloff Gallery, University of Hartford	Connecticut		
1998	The Ugly Show	Leeds Metropolitan University Gallery	Leeds		
1998	The Ugly Show	The Long Gallery, South Hill Park Arts Centre	Bracknell		
1999	The Nude in Contemporary Art	Aldrich Museum of Contemporary Art	Connecticut		
2000	Solutus	Gallery Faurschou	Copenhagen		
2000	Painting the Century: 101 Masterpieces, 1900–2000	National Portrait Gallery	London		
2000	Ant Noises	Saatchi Gallery	London		
2000	Ant Noises 2	Saatchi Gallery	London		
2001	Les volupté	Borusan Gallery	Istanbul		
2001	Narcissus	National Gallery of Scotland	Edinburgh		
2001	Great British Paintings from American Collections: Holbein to Hockne	Yale Center for British Art	New Haven, Connecticut		
2001	Naked since 1950	C&M Arts	New York		
2002	The Nude in 20th Century Art	Kunsthalle Emden	Emden		
2002	Closed Contact	Gagosian Gallery	Beverly Hills	In collaboration with Glen Luchford	
2002	The Physical World: An Exhibition of Painting and Sculpture	Gagosian Gallery	New York		
2002	Women	Eyestorm Gallery	London		
2002	Art, Age and Gender: Women Explore the Issue	Orleans House Gallery	Twickenham		
2002	Art, Age and Gender: Women Explore the Issue	Usher Gallery	Lincoln		
2002	Art, Age and Gender: Women Explore the Issue	New Greenham Arts	Newbury, Berkshire		
2003	Pittura/Painting: From Rauschenberg to Murakami, 1964–2003, 50th Venice Biennale	Museo Correr	Venice		
2003	Witness: Theories of Seduction	Dorsky Gallery	Long Island City, New York		
2004	Drawings	Gagosian Gallery	London		
2004	Galleon and Other Stories	Saatchi Gallery			
2004	Open House: Working in Brooklyn	Brooklyn Museum of Art	New York		
2004	SITE Sante Fe’s Fifth International Biennial: Disparities and Deformations: Our Grotesque	SITE	Santa Fe, New Mexico		
2004	Large Scale Polaroids by Jenny Saville and Glen Luchford	University of Massachusetts Amherst, East Gallery	Massachusetts		
2004	Summer Exhibition	Royal Academy of Arts	London		
2005	The Figure In and Out of Space	Gagosian Gallery	New York		
2005	Il Male. Esercizi di Pittura Crudele	Pallazina di Caccia di Stupinigi	Turin		
2005	London Calling: Y(oung) B(ritish) A(rtists) criss-crossed	Kaare Berntsen Galleri	Oslo		
2005	Self-portraitBritish Art	National Portrait Gallery	London		
2005	Self-portraitBritish Art	Art Gallery of New South Wales	Sidney		
2006	British Art	Thomas Gibson Fine Art	London		
2006	Damien Hirst, David Salle, Jenny Saville: The Bilotti Chapel	Museo Carlo Bilotti	Rome		
2006	ERETICA-L’arte contemporanea dalla trascedenza al profano	Palazzo di Sant’Anna	Palermo		
2006	RADAR: Selections from the Collection of Vicki and Kent Logan	Denver Art Museum	Denver, Colorado		
2007	Berlinde de Bruyckere, Jenny Saville, Dan Flavin	Kunstmuseum Luzern	Lucerne		
2007	Insight?	Gagosian Gallery, Barvikha Luxury Village	Moscow		
2007	Summer Show	Gagosian Gallery	New York		
2009	Paint Made Flesh	Frist Center for the Visual Arts	Nashville		
2009	Paint Made Flesh	The Phillips Collection	Washington DC		
2009	Paint Made Flesh	Memorial Art Gallery, University of Rochester	New York		
2010	Crash: Homage to JG Ballard	Gagosian Gallery	London		
2010	Flesh	Galerie Sophie Scheidecker	Paris		
2011	Gagosian Pop-Up!	Gagosian Gallery	London		
2011	Eroi	Galleria d’Arte Moderna	Turin		
2011	Summer Exhibition	Royal Academy of Arts	London		
2014	Egon Schiele - Jenny Saville	Kunsthaus Zürich	Zürich		
2015	Rubens and His Legacy: Van Dyck to Cézanne	Royal Academy of Arts	London		
2016	Desire	Moore Building	Miami		
2016	Nude: From Modigliani to Currin	Gagosian Gallery	New York		
2016	Her Crowd: New Art by Women from Our Neighbors’ Private Collections	Bruce Museum	Greenwich, Connecticut		
2017	From Life	Royal Academy of Arts	London		
2017	Drawing Together	Courtauld Gallery	London		
2018	Bacon, Freud, and the School of London Painters	Hungarian National Gallery	Budapest		
2018	Now	Scottish National Gallery of Modern Art	Edinburgh	During the Edinburgh Art Festival	
2019	The Aerodrome: An exhibition dedicated to the memory of Michael Stanley	Ikon Gallery	Birmingham		
2019	Visions of the Self: Rembrandt and Now	Gagosian Gallery	London		
2019	An Exhibition for Notre-Dame	Gagosian Gallery	Paris		
2020	Bodyscapes	Israel Museum	Jerusalem		
2020	Butes de Femmes: Busts of Women: Paris 10th Anniversary Exhibition	Gagosian Gallery	Paris		
2020	Person of Interest	Sheldon Museum of Art, University of Nebraska	Lincoln, Nebraska		
2020	Portraying Pregnancy: From Holbein to Social Media	Foundling Museum	London		
2020	Inspiration: Iconic Works	National Museum	Stockholm		
2020	Inspiration: Iconic Works	Ateneum, Finnish National Gallery	Finland		
2021	Hi Woman! La notizia del futuro	Museo di Palazzo Pretorio	Prato		
2021	Hong Kong Exchange	Gagosian Gallery	Hong Kong		
2021	The Human Body	Hill Art Foundation	New York		
2022	Haunted Realism	Gagosian Gallery	London		

2006	Museo Carlo Billoti	Rome

== Collections ==
Saville's work is in several public collections including:

- The Broad, Los Angeles
- The George Economou Collection, Athens
- Metropolitan Museum of Art, New York
- Morgan Library & Museum, New York
- Museum of Contemporary Art, San Diego
- The Museum of Fine Arts, Houston
- National Portrait Gallery, London
- Norton Museum of Art, West Palm Beach, Florida
- San Francisco Museum of Modern Art
- Scottish National Gallery of Modern Art, Edinburgh
- Seattle Art Museum
- Tate, London

== Commercial use of work ==
=== Album covers ===
Saville's paintings have appeared on two album covers:

- 1994 – Strategy (South Face/Front Face/North Face) appeared on the cover of Manic Street Preachers' third album The Holy Bible.
- 2009 – Stare (2005) was used for Manic Street Preacher's 2009 album Journal for Plague Lovers. UK supermarkets stocked the CD in a plain slipcase, after the cover was deemed "inappropriate". The band's James Dean Bradfield said the decision was "utterly bizarre and commented,: "You can have lovely shiny buttocks and guns everywhere in the supermarket on covers of magazines and CDs, but you show a piece of art and people just freak out". The album cover art was placed second in a 2009 poll for Best Art Vinyl.

== Other activities ==
- Gagosian Gallery, Member of the Board of Directors (since 2022)

== Personal ==
Saville lives and works in Oxford, UK.

== Sources ==
- Jenny Saville, Organized by Cheryl Brutvan, Texts by Cheryl Brutvan and Nicholas Cullinan, Norton Museum of Art, West Palm Beach, Florida, 2011.
