= Boo Saville =

British contemporary artist (born 1980)

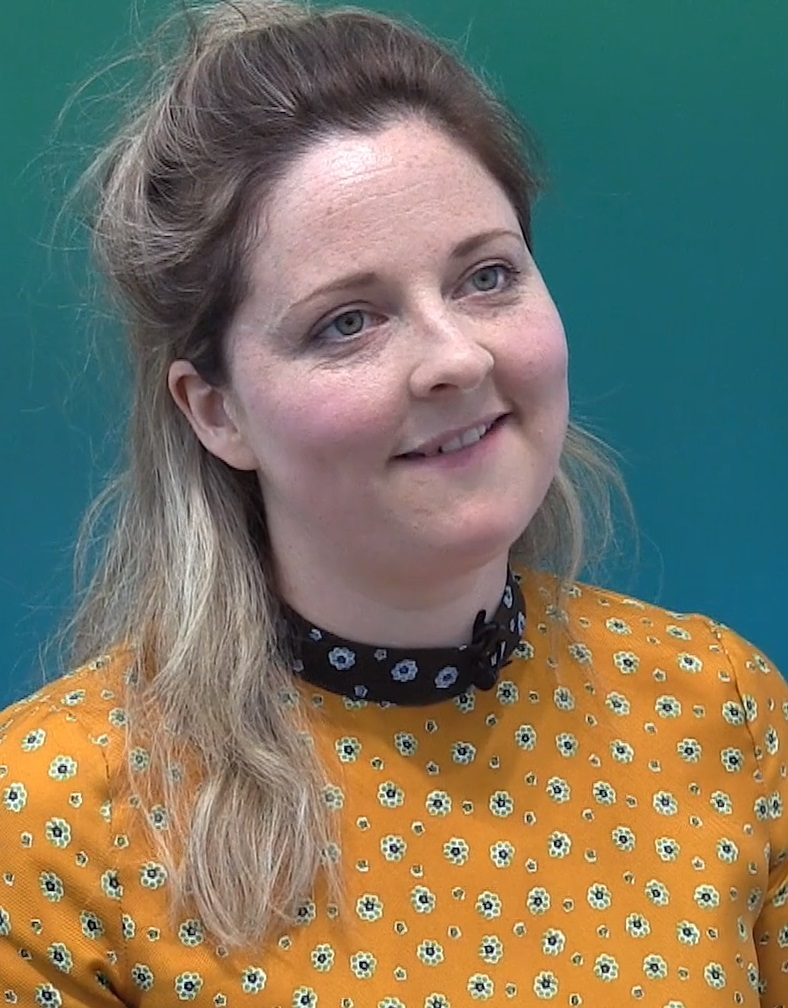
Boo Saville at True Colours, Newport Street Gallery, London, 12 June 2018

Boo Saville (born 15 January 1980) is a contemporary artist.

== Early life ==
Saville was born in Norwich, and has a sister, also an artist Jenny Saville. She graduated with a Bachelor of Arts from Slade School of Fine Art in 2004.

== Career ==
Saville has been known to do detailed drawings using Biros as her main material, her work focusing on the decomposition of the body after death. Her work includes Jericho (2009), Dissected Head (2014), Snakes (2014), Cry (2018), One Thing After Another (Morning, Afternoon, Evening, Night) (2022).

She has exhibited widely in London and Europe. She received attention when her work was selected by Nicholas Forrest as Critics Choice at Saatchi Online. and had work exhibited in Black Dog- Yellow House, a group show curated by Rachel Howard.

Her work has been associated with New Gothic Art. and she runs a blog collecting images and quotes from the internet about death www.bonesanddust.blogspot.com

Boo Saville is represented by Davidson Gallery in New York, and TJ Boulting Gallery in London.

In 2018, she was commissioned by Damien Hirst to produce artworks for his exhibition True Colours.

== Solo exhibitions ==
- 2008: Laid Bare, Martin Summers Fine Art, London
- 2009: Ghost/Ghost Proof, Other Criteria, London
- 2009: Butter Sunk, Trolley Gallery, London
- 2021-2022: The Smoke Detector and the Watchtower Davidson Gallery, New York
- 2022: Ma TJ Boulting gallery, London

== Group exhibitions ==
- 2018: True Colours Damien Hirst’s Newport Street Gallery
