= Journal for Plague Lovers =

2009 studio album by Manic Street Preachers

Studio album by Manic Street Preachers
- Released: 18 May 2009
- Recorded: October 2008 – February 2009
- Studios: Rockfield Studios in Monmouth, Wales
- Genres: Alternative rock; art rock; post-punk
- Length: 42:37
- Label: Columbia
- Producers: Steve Albini; Dave Eringa

Manic Street Preachers chronology
Send Away the Tigers (2007)	Journal for Plague Lovers (2009)	Postcards from a Young Man (2010)

Journal for Plague Lovers is the ninth studio album by Welsh alternative rock band Manic Street Preachers, released on 18 May 2009 by Columbia Records. Recorded between October 2008 and February 2009 and produced by Steve Albini and Dave Eringa, it features exclusively posthumously published lyrics by Richey Edwards, who disappeared on 1 February 1995 and was presumed deceased in 2008. It is the only Manic Street Preachers album in which the lyrics for every song were written solely by Edwards.

The album received critical acclaim upon release and debuted at number three on the UK Albums Chart.

== Music and lyrics ==
The Manics posted the following message on their official website:

All thirteen songs on the new record feature lyrics left to us by Richey. The brilliance and intelligence of the lyrics dictated that we had to finally use them. Topics include The Grande Odalisque by Ingres, Marlon Brando, Giant Haystacks, celebrity, consumerism and dysmorphia; all reiterating the genius and intellect of Richard James Edwards.

Wire, the band's de facto lyricist, had begun contributing musically to the songwriting process on the album, stating "I did write quite a bit of music. [...] I wrote all of 'William's Last Words', I wrote pretty much all of 'Marlon JD', I wrote the chorus for 'Peeled Apples', the verse for 'She Bathed Herself in a Bath of Bleach'". The lyrics are taken from a folder of songs, haikus, collages and drawings Edwards gave to bassist-lyricist Nicky Wire a few weeks before he disappeared. Edwards also gave photocopies of the folder to singer-guitarist James Dean Bradfield and drummer Sean Moore. The band have described the Rymans folder as having a picture of Bugs Bunny drawn on the front emblazoned with the word 'opulence' in capital letters. In promotional interviews for the album, Bradfield and Wire have revealed that the folder contains around twenty-eight songs. Four of these appeared on the 1996 album Everything Must Go: "Elvis Impersonator: Blackpool Pier", "Kevin Carter", "Removables" and "Small Black Flowers that Grow in the Sky". Of the rest of the folder, Wire stated:

There's probably between eight and ten maybe that were too impossible. Some of them are little haikus, four lines. "Dolphin-Friendly Tuna Wars", that's one; "Alien Orders/Invisible Armies", that's one [the band have recorded an instrumental that takes its title from this lyric]; "Young Men", which is quite Joy Division. They just didn't feel right. We'll probably put them all out in a book one day. There's not gonna be a Journal for Plague Lovers Two. The special version of the record does come with the original version of the tracks on there. So you can see the editing process, if there is any.

The album was released with a Deluxe edition that included pages from Richey's journal. The table of contents page for Richey's journal is reproduced within the liner notes. Eighteen of the twenty-eight listings there, however, are removed using black felt-tip. There are only a limited number of pages from the journal that are reproduced in the liner notes.

Several tracks refer to Edwards' time in a couple of hospitals in 1994. Among them is "She Bathed Herself in a Bath of Bleach", of which James Dean Bradfield said to the NME: "There're some people he met when he was in one of the two places having treatment and I think he just digested other people's stories and experiences." The final track, "William's Last Words", has been compared to a suicide note, and although Nicky Wire rejects this suggestion Bradfield observes, "you can draw some pretty obvious conclusions from the lyrics." Wire, who admitted finding the task of editing this song "pretty choking", eventually composed the music and sang lead vocals after Bradfield found himself unsuited to the task. The album features several cultural references, including a passage from the film The Machinist, which features in the song "Peeled Apples" and a passage taken from the film The Virgin Suicides, which features in the song "Doors Closing Slowly".

Bradfield commented that Journal for Plague Lovers was an attempt to finally secure the legacy of their former member Richey Edwards and the result was that, during the recording process, it was as close to feeling his presence since his disappearance: "There was a sense of responsibility to do his words justice. That was part of the whole thing of letting enough time lapse. Once we actually got into the studio, it almost felt as if we were a full band; it [was] as close to him being in the room again as possible."

Stylistically, the album features a post-punk and alternative rock sound reminiscent of The Holy Bible. Cam Lindsay of Exclaim! proclaimed the record to be a "relentlessly exploratory piece of art rock".

The album's opening track "Peeled Apples" was played for the first time on Zane Lowe's BBC Radio 1 show on 25 March 2009. During an interview with Lowe, Wire said there would be no singles released from the album. However, "Jackie Collins Existential Question Time" was distributed to radio stations ahead of the album's release as a promotional 2-track CDR, which included the album version and a censored radio edit. A music video directed by Douglas Hart was also produced, featuring the band performing in their then studio in front of the Jenny Saville painting used on the album cover. The song was later included as a one-sided 7" single in the limited edition National Treasures deluxe singles box set released in 2011. "Jackie Collins Existential Question Time" first aired on XFM and Kerrang! Radio on 30 March. It was also embedded on the band's official website.

== Release ==
The album was released on 18 May 2009 on CD, a two-disc CD edition, download and LP. The album entered the UK Album Chart at number 3 and spending 5 weeks on the Top 100, selling 34,707 copies in the first week. It charted within the Top 20 in Ireland and in Norway. So far the album has been certified Silver in the UK.

A Deluxe Edition CD was released, includes a second disc with demo versions of all thirteen album songs and a hardback 36-page booklet featuring Edwards' original lyrics and artwork. These lyrics, in the process of adaptation to the album, had often been substantially edited and rearranged. This version of the album is missing the hidden track "Bag Lady", whose lyrics are however not included on the single disc edition. The Japanese edition of the album was released on 13 May 2009, and features two exclusive bonus tracks. The download version includes a bonus remix by the NYPC and an acoustic version of the title track.

=== Cover art controversy ===
The album cover art uses an original painting, Stare (2005), by Jenny Saville, who also contributed artwork for The Holy Bible. The top four UK supermarkets stocked the CD in a plain slipcase, after the cover was deemed "inappropriate" due to the belief that the red on the boy's face was blood. Bradfield said the decision was "utterly bizarre", and commented:

You can have lovely shiny buttocks and guns everywhere in the supermarket on covers of magazines and CDs, but you show a piece of art and people just freak out.

The album cover art placed second in a 2009 poll for Best Art Vinyl.

== Reception ==
Professional ratings
Aggregate scores
Source	Rating
AnyDecentMusic?	7.7/10
Metacritic	85/100
Review scores
Source	Rating
AllMusic	4.5/5 stars
The Guardian	4/5 stars
The Irish Times	3/5 stars
Mojo	4/5 stars
NME	8/10
The Observer	4/5 stars
Pitchfork	7.8/10
Q	5/5 stars
Record Collector	4/5 stars
Uncut	4/5 stars

Contrary to worries on the part of Nicky Wire that Journal for Plague Lovers "could seriously damage" the band, and in spite of initial suspicions that the album constituted "a blatant attempt to recapture the glory days of an album [they] released 15 years ago", reviews were ultimately highly favourable. At Metacritic, which assigns a normalized rating out of 100 to reviews from mainstream critics, the album received an average score of 85 out of 100 based on eighteen reviews, which indicates "universal acclaim".

Journal for Plague Lovers scored a rare five-star review in Q magazine, which argued that by "breathing life into Richey Edwards's own last words", the band "crafted not a memorial but a celebration". Retrospectively, the publication named the album the fifth best record of 2009, declaring it one of the band's "finest and most heartfelt moments". John Doran from NME awarded the record an 8/10 grade, arguing that Journal for Plague Lovers should not be burdened with expectations of becoming "The Holy Bible Mark II" but was simply "an outstanding album in its own right". The magazine named the album the 14th best of the year. Uncut, meanwhile, argued that the record brought a "sense of closure" to the legacy of Richey Edwards, describing it as a "brave, compelling record that stands shoulder to shoulder with the Manics' best", and the twenty-third best album of 2009.

Response from news publications was mostly positive, with Caroline Sullivan of The Guardian describing it as "a passionate rock album that honours the past yet is very much of the present", and Simon Price of The Independent declared Journal for Plague Lovers "the album of 2009 – hands down, no contest". David Cheal of The Daily Telegraph was critical, however, accusing them of being "a plodding indie-rock trio whose ambition has consistently outstripped their ability" and giving the record only two stars out of five. Elsewhere, Journal for Plague Lovers earned recognition as a return to form begun on previous album Send Away the Tigers; for example, from Pitchfork's Joe Tangari, who summarized the album thus: "Even if it were the desperate or cynical move some people have claimed it is, there's no denying that purging Edwards' old lyric folder has helped the band create its best album in a decade. Quite simply, they haven't sounded so focused or so purposeful in a long, long time, and they are at their best with a sense of purpose underpinning their music." Likewise, Stephen Thomas Erlewine of AllMusic remarked that "they were making inroads in this direction on 2007's Send Away the Tigers – for tight, clanking, cantankerous guitars" and commended the album for its sense of hope: "Journal for Plague Lovers winds up being The Holy Bible in reverse: every moment of despair is a reason to keep on living instead of an excuse to pack it all in."

=== Accolades ===
Journal for Plague Lovers was placed at number 10 on Metacritic's list of the fifty best-reviewed albums of 2009, and was placed on numerous critics' ranking lists for the year, particularly from British music magazines:

- On 15 December it was chosen as one of AllMusic's favourite albums of 2009.
- UK music website Drowned in Sound placed Journal for Plague Lovers at number 4 in their list of the fifty best albums of 2009.
- The Guardian newspaper selected Journal for Plague Lovers at number 11 in their critics' poll for 2009.
- Mojo placed the album at number 20 in their list of the fifty best albums of 2009.
- Journal for Plague Lovers made number 14 in NME's list of the fifty best albums of 2009.
- Q placed the record at number 5 in their list of the fifty best albums of 2009.
- Another British music website, The Quietus, chose the album as the fifth best of 2009.
- Journal for Plague Lovers placed at 23 in Uncut's list of the fifty best albums of 2009.

== Track listing ==
All lyrics are written by Richey Edwards; all music is composed by Manic Street Preachers (James Dean Bradfield, Sean Moore, Nicky Wire).

Journal for Plague Lovers track listing
No.	Title	Length
1.	"Peeled Apples"	3:33
2.	"Jackie Collins Existential Question Time"	2:24
3.	"Me and Stephen Hawking"	2:46
4.	"This Joke Sport Severed"	3:04
5.	"Journal for Plague Lovers"	3:45
6.	"She Bathed Herself in a Bath of Bleach"	2:18
7.	"Facing Page: Top Left"	2:40
8.	"Marlon J.D."	2:50
9.	"Doors Closing Slowly"	2:52
10.	"All Is Vanity"	3:35
11.	"Pretension/Repulsion"	2:05
12.	"Virginia State Epileptic Colony"	3:25
13.	"William's Last Words" (featuring the hidden track "Bag Lady")	10:48
Total length:		42:37

Digital bonus tracks
No.	Title	Length
14.	"Marlon J.D." (NYPC's 'Wire Up' Mix)	3:33
15.	"Journal for Plague Lovers" (acoustic)	2:24
Total length:		48:34

Japan bonus tracks
No.	Title	Length
13.	"William's Last Words"	4:17
14.	"Alien Orders/Invisible Armies"	2:36
15.	"Primitive Painters" (Felt cover; features the hidden track "Bag Lady")	10:13
Total length:		48:55

Deluxe edition bonus disc: Original Demos
No.	Title	Length
1.	"Peeled Apples" (demo)	2:29
2.	"Jackie Collins Existential Question Time" (demo)	2:18
3.	"Me and Stephen Hawking" (demo)	2:40
4.	"This Joke Sport Severed" (demo)	2:46
5.	"Journal for Plague Lovers" (demo)	3:32
6.	"She Bathed Herself in a Bath of Bleach" (demo)	2:25
7.	"Facing Page: Top Left" (demo)	2:00
8.	"Marlon J.D." (demo)	2:30
9.	"Doors Closing Slowly" (demo)	2:24
10.	"All Is Vanity" (demo)	3:03
11.	"Pretension/Repulsion" (demo)	2:06
12.	"Virginia State Epileptic Colony" (demo)	3:22
13.	"William's Last Words" (demo)	4:14
Total length:		35:55

== Personnel ==
Manic Street Preachers

- James Dean Bradfield – lead vocals, lead and rhythm guitar
- Sean Moore – drums, percussion
- Nicky Wire – bass guitar, backing vocals, lead vocals on "William's Last Words", piano on "Virginia State Epileptic Colony"

Additional musicians

- Andy Walters – string arrangement, strings
- Katherine Thomas – harp
- Joanna Parkhurst – strings
- Bernard Kane – strings
- Nathan Stone – strings

Technical personnel

- Steve Albini – recording (tracks 1–3, 6–7, 9–11 and 13), mixing ("William's Last Words")
- Dave Eringa – mixing (all tracks except "William's Last Words"), recording (tracks 4, 5 and 8), production (tracks 2, 4, 5, 8 and 12)
- Loz Williams – recording (tracks 1, 5, 6 and 11–13), recording and engineering of original demos
- Steve Davis – recording ("Marlon J.D.")
- Greg Norman – engineering
- Ben Cunningham – engineering assistance
- Jenny Saville – front cover artwork
- Mitch Ikeda – sleeve photography
- Nicky Wire – sleeve design
- Steve Stacey – sleeve design

== Charts ==
Chart performance for Journal for Plague Lovers
Chart (2009)	Peak position
Belgian Albums (Ultratop Flanders)	69
Czech Albums (ČNS IFPI)	31
Dutch Albums (Album Top 100)	88
Finnish Albums (Suomen virallinen lista)	23
German Albums (Offizielle Top 100)	49
Irish Albums (IRMA)	6
New Zealand Albums (RMNZ)	35
Norwegian Albums (VG-lista)	16
Scottish Albums (Official Charts)	3
Spanish Albums (Promusicae)	54
Swedish Albums (Sverigetopplistan)	37
Swiss Albums (Schweizer Hitparade)	30
UK Albums (Official Charts)	3
UK Album Downloads (Official Charts)	5

== Certifications ==
Certifications for Journal for Plague Lovers
Region	Certification	Certified units/sales
United Kingdom (BPI)	Silver	60,000^{*}
^{*} Sales figures based on certification alone.

== Remixes ==
Journal for Plague Lovers Remixes

EP by Manic Street Preachers
- Released: 15 June 2009 (EP); 15 September 2009 (album)

Manic Street Preachers chronology
Journal for Plague Lovers (2009)	Journal for Plague Lovers Remixes (2009)	Postcards from a Young Man (2010)

=== Extended play ===
Tracks from Journal for Plague Lovers have been remixed by a number of artists, and the Journal for Plague Lovers Remixes EP was released on 15 June 2009. Andrew Weatherall remixed "Peeled Apples", which he described as "sounding like Charlie Watts playing with PiL"; Martin Noble of the band British Sea Power remixed the song "Me and Stephen Hawking"; Adem remixed "Facing Page: Top Left"; Errors remixed "All Is Vanity" and The Horrors remixed "Doors Closing Slowly".

Extended play track listing
No.	Title	Length
1.	"Peeled Apples" (Andrew Weatherall remix)	7:44
2.	"Me and Stephen Hawking" (British Sea Power remix)	4:28
3.	"Facing Page: Top Left" (Adem remix)	3:40
4.	"All Is Vanity" (Errors remix)	3:09
5.	"Doors Closing Slowly" (The Horrors remix)	3:27

=== Album ===
Three months later, the band's official website announced a full remix album, featuring all five remixes from the Journal for Plague Lovers EP and a new, exclusive remix for the rest of the songs on the album (including for hidden track "Bag Lady").

Four Tet remixed "Pretension/Repulsion"; Patrick Wolf remixed "This Joke Sport Severed”; The Pariahs remixed "She Bathed Herself in a Bath of Bleach"; Optimo remixed "Journal for Plague Lovers"; Saint Etienne remixed "Jackie Collins Existential Question Time"; NYPC remixed "Marlon J.D."; (Note: NYPC's remix of "Marlon J.D." is erroneously listed in the press release for the remix EP's track list, and is only on the remix album release.) Fuck Buttons remixed "Virginia State Epileptic Colony"; Jonathan Krisp remixed "Bag Lady" and Underworld remixed "William’s Last Words". The album release is sometimes listed as Cooking - Cleaning - Flower Arranging: Journal for Plague Lovers Remixes.

Album edition track listing
No.	Title	Length
1.	"Peeled Apples" (Andrew Weatherall remix)	7:38
2.	"Me And Stephen Hawking" (British Sea Power remix)	4:27
3.	"Pretension/Repulsion" (Four Tet remix)	2:43
4.	"This Joke Sport Severed" (Patrick Wolf's Love Letter to Richey remix)	4:19
5.	"She Bathed Herself in a Bath of Bleach" (The Pariahs remix)	2:16
6.	"Journal for Plague Lovers" (Optimo (Espacio) remix)	7:13
7.	"Jackie Collins Existential Question Time" (Saint Etienne remix)	2:24
8.	"Marlon J.D" (NYPC's Wire Up mix)	4:55
9.	"Facing Page: Top Left" (Adem remix)	3:36
10.	"All Is Vanity" (Errors remix)	3:09
11.	"Virginia State Epileptic Colony" (Fuck Buttons remix)	5:28
12.	"Bag Lady" (Jonathan Krisp remix)	5:07
13.	"Doors Closing Slowly" (The Horrors remix)	3:27
14.	"William's Last Words" (Underworld remix)	6:16
