= Peeled Apples =

Song by Manic Street Preachers

from the album Journal for Plague Lovers
- Released: 18 May 2009
- Recorded: October 2008 – February 2009 at Rockfield Studios, Monmouth, Monmouthshire, Wales
- Genre: Alternative rock, post-punk
- Label: Columbia
- Songwriters: Richey Edwards, James Dean Bradfield, Sean Moore, Nicky Wire
- Producer: Steve Albini

"Peeled Apples" is a song by Welsh alternative rock band Manic Street Preachers. It is the opening track of the band's ninth studio album, Journal for Plague Lovers. Produced by Steve Albini, the song, along with the other tracks of the album, features posthumous lyrics by Richey Edwards, who disappeared on 1 February 1995, and was declared legally dead in 2008.

The song debuted on Zane Lowe's BBC Radio 1 program on 25 March 2009.

== Background ==
The lyrics of the song are taken from the notebooks and the artwork which Richey Edwards left to the band members just before his disappearance. The song also features an audio sample from the 2004 movie, The Machinist.

In an interview with NME in 2009, the band's lead vocalist and lead guitarist James Dean Bradfield stated that the band's bassist Nicky Wire wrote the music to half of the song. In a subsequent interview, Wire stated that he wrote the chorus of the song.

== Critical reception ==
The song received generally positive reviews from music critics. Lee White of This Is Fake DIY stated that "the song delivered with confidence and feels more considered than the onrush of fury and emotion that trademarked The Holy Bible." Mike Diver of Clash argued that "the song is among the most aggressive pieces the Manics have penned since the days of ‘Faster’, the thundering drumbeats propelling it to juddering climax, while Wire’s bass work has rarely sounded so pant-wettingly threatening." Dom Gourlay of Drowned in Sound also compared the song to the track "Faster", also describing songs' verses as "simply one of the most compelling vignettes the Manic Street Preachers have ever recorded." David Smith of Popmatters praised Steve Albini's "refreshingly raw" production work on the song. Joe Tangari of Pitchfork stated that the song "opens the album with a colossal kick to the head as a queasy bassline is joined by pounding drums and sandpaper guitar to back Bradfield's righteous shout."

Sam Richards of Uncut stated that the song features "an oil-boring bass rumble, a searing post-punk guitar line and a slew of unmistakable Richey aphorisms." He also described it as a pulsating opener, also inferring that "the band have recaptured that taut urgency, accommodating both their punk instincts and their stadium rock flourishes." In his separate track review, Jonathan Garrett of Pitchfork wrote: "No question that "Apples" is firmly rooted in the past, splitting the difference between the near-pathologically hook-laden Generation Terrorists and the more deliberately caustic The Holy Bible, and there will undoubtedly be some who dismiss it solely on those grounds-- chalking up "Apples" as nothing more than an overly cynical, calculated attempt to cash in on the Edwards era from a band straining not to show its age."

== Remix ==
The song was remixed by English DJ and record producer Andrew Weatherall, who performed on the band's two London Astoria shows, which were Richey Edwards' final live appearances before his disappearance. The remix was included in the Journal For Plague Lovers Remixes EP, which was released on 15 June 2009.

== Personnel ==
Manic Street Preachers

- James Dean Bradfield – lead vocals, lead and rhythm guitar
- Sean Moore – drums, percussion
- Nicky Wire – bass guitar
- Richey Edwards - lyrics

Technical personnel

- Steve Albini – recording, production
- Dave Eringa – mixing
- Loz Williams – recording
- Greg Norman – engineering
- Ben Cunningham – engineering assistance
