= 4st 7lb =

1994 song by Manic Street Preachers

Song by Manic Street Preachers

from the album The Holy Bible
- Released: 29 August 1994
- Studio: Sound Space Studios, Cardiff, Wales
- Genre: Art rock; gothic rock
- Length: 5:05
- Label: Epic
- Composers: James Dean Bradfield, Sean Moore
- Lyricist: Richey Edwards
- Producer: Manic Street Preachers

"4st 7lb" is a song by Welsh alternative rock band Manic Street Preachers, from the band's third album, The Holy Bible (1994).

== Music and lyrics ==
Musically, the song features art rock riffs and the extensive addition of guitar reverb. The verse riff in the first half of the song revolves around an arpeggiated diminished seventh chord, and has been compared to that of "Eton Rifles" by The Jam. Then, the song slows down and becomes a more atmospheric, minimalist base.

Lyrically, the song describes advanced-stage anorexia; it is about a teenage girl who wants "to be so skinny, that she rots from view". It has been widely interpreted as a reflection of the band's guitarist and lyricist Richey Edwards's own personal struggle with the disease, which was confirmed by the band's bass guitarist and co-lyricist Nicky Wire. The spoken intro was sampled from the documentary Caraline's Story, which chronicles the final months of Caraline Neville-Lister, who died of anorexia in 1994 at age 29.

The song was named after 4 stones 7 pounds, or 63 pounds (29 kg), the weight below which death is said to be medically unavoidable for an anorexia sufferer.

== Reception ==
The song received acclaim from music critics. Nick Butler of Sputnikmusic praised the song, referring it as "quite simply, genius". He also commented that the song "contains one of the best lyrics even written by anyone, replete with the awesome chorus", while describing the song's musical structure in detail. Stephen Thomas Erlewine of AllMusic wrote: "the diary of anorexia '4st 7lb' is one of the most chilling songs in rock & roll". Tim O'Neil of PopMatters described the song as "the most specifically evocative track on the album". Mark Edwards of Stylus Magazine stated that the song, along with two other tracks, "Mausoleum" and "Faster", "takes your breath away", while commenting that the song is deeply disturbing. He also inferred that "it comes as close to glamourising anorexia as you can get". In a retrospective review, critic Mike Cormack wrote that "Simply as a literary artefact, “4st 7lb” (the weight at which anorexia becomes fatal) is among the most impressive achievements in rock music. Its music is equally crafted, nauseating waves of guitar in the first half subsiding in a rare diminuendo, gradually declining to nothingness to mirror the anorexic’s final decline... '4st 7lb' is a towering reminder of the potential of rock music. It is utterly harrowing and yet almost majestic in its artistry."

== Personnel ==
Manic Street Preachers

- James Dean Bradfield – vocals, lead and rhythm guitars, production
- Richey Edwards – lyrics, production
- Nicky Wire – bass guitar, production
- Sean Moore – drums, production

Technical

- Alex Silva – engineering
- Mark Freegard – mixing
