= Terence Koh =

Canadian artist (born 1977)

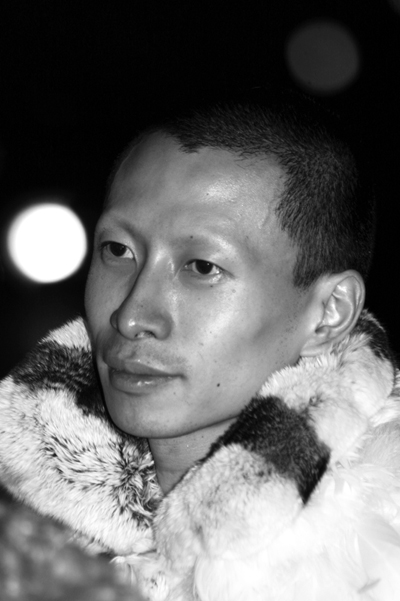
- Koh in 2007
- Born: Terence Koh; 1977 (age 48–49); Beijing, China
- Education: Emily Carr Institute of Art and Design, Vancouver and The University of Waterloo, Ontario
- Known for: Sculptor, performance and installation artist
- Movement: New Gothic Art
- Awards: 2008 Sobey Art Award Short List

Terence Koh (born 1977 in Beijing, China ) is a Canadian artist who has also worked under the alias "asianpunkboy". The artist's work spans a range of media, including drawing, sculpture, video, performance, and the internet. Originally working under the alias asianpunkboy, Koh designed zines and custom-made books. His recent work has expanded to include durational performances, complex installations, and the exploration of natural ecosystems. Much of his diverse work involves queer, punk, and pornographic sensibilities. In 2008, he was listed in Out magazine's "Out 100 People of the Year".

== Early life and education ==
Koh was raised in Mississauga, Ontario, and now lives in Northern California. He is a Chinese-Canadian artist who received degrees from the Emily Carr Institute of Art and Design, Vancouver and The University of Waterloo, Ontario.

== Career ==
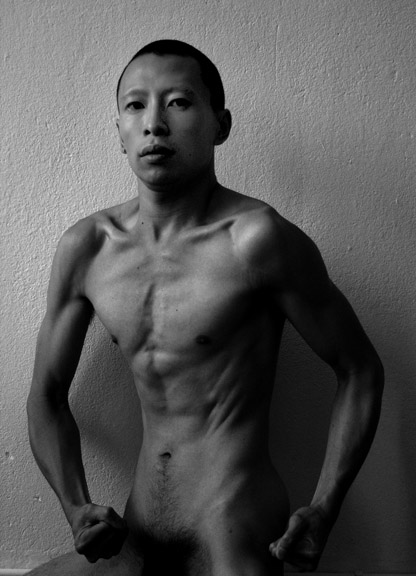
Koh in a self-portrait

Koh's work was included in the Whitney Biennial (2004), and the Yokohama Triennial (2008). In 2008, he was a finalist for the Sobey Award. His work was the subject of solo exhibitions at MUSAC, León, Spain (2008); Schirn Kunsthalle, Frankfurt, Germany (2008); the Whitney Museum of American Art, New York (2007); Kunsthalle Zürich, Switzerland (2006); and the Vienna Secession, Austria (2005). His work is in the permanent collections of institutions such as the Museum of Modern Art, New York; the Whitney Museum of American Art, New York; and the Tate Modern, London, UK.

Koh's work has been associated with New Gothic Art. In nothingtoodoo, his first solo show at the Mary Boone Gallery, Koh, "dressed in white pajamalike clothes, slowly circl[es] a beautiful cone-shaped pile of rocky solar salt — 8 feet high and 24 feet across — on his knees." So Roberta Smith described the work in an appreciative March 2011, review. "This is performance art reduced to a bare and relentless rite in a space that has been stripped down to a kind of temple. (Its regal proportions help.) ... Maybe the work is an extended apology for past bad-boy behavior."

In 2008 he created the Terence Koh Show on YouTube, engaging in interviews in his home - including abstract episodes such as when he plays the video forward but audio backwards. Notable guests have included Marina Abramović, Hans Ulrich Obrist, and most recently, Lady Gaga. In the clip with Lady Gaga titled "88 pearls", Koh counts a bowl of pearls with Lady Gaga, who is wearing a costume inspired by Koh's sculpture from his project Boy By The Sea. Koh's affiliation with the pop star began at the 2010 Grammys, where Lady Gaga performed on a piano designed by Koh specifically for the occasion. In the tradition of Piero Manzoni, Koh has gold-plated and sold his own feces for a total of $500,000.00 to collectors.
