= Christian Jankowski =

German artist (born 1968)

Christian Jankowski (born 1968 in Göttingen, West Germany) is a German contemporary multimedia artist who largely works with video, installation and photography. He lives and works in Berlin and New York.

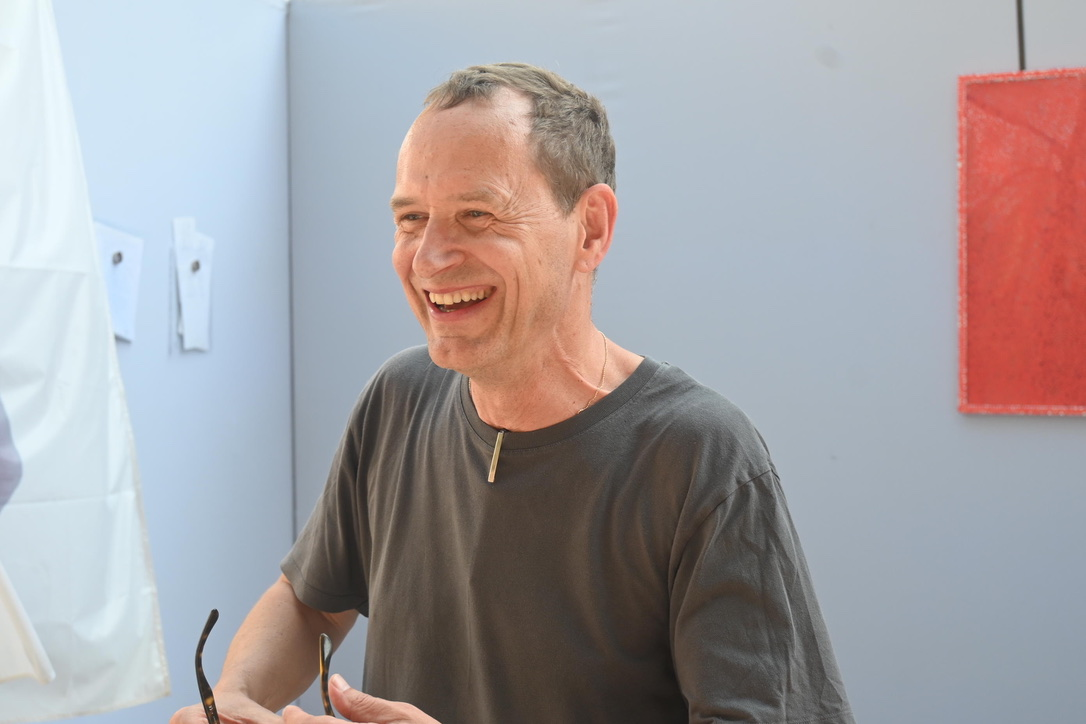
Jankowski in 2025

== Work ==
Jankowski's work has been associated with New Gothic Art and compared with artists like Rirkrit Tiravanija, Gillian Wearing, and Pierre Huyghe. Using various media formats, the collaborative nature of his practice is paramount as each participant unwittingly contributes his or her own texture to the work.

The Hunt (1992), a performance video piece, is one of the artists earliest works. For one week the artist visited supermarkets and rather than select his goods as customary, he‘ hunted down’ his groceries, shooting each item with a children’s bow and arrow, accompanied by a friend with a video camera. For the 23-minute video Lycan Theorized (2006), Jankowski persuaded the cast and crew working in an actual straight-to-DVD werewolf movie (in which he had a bit part) to re-enact some of its most violent scenes while quoting the writings of various film theorists. The film Casting Jesus (2011) focuses on an audition to select an actor that best interprets the role of Jesus, judged by a jury of Vatican members.

Jankowski has also created a number of television interventions. His video installation Telemistica was included in the 1999 Venice Biennale, and shows five Italian television fortune-tellers responding to a phoned-in question about the artist's success or failure at the upcoming Biennale. The Holy Artwork (2001) is a collaboration with a televangelist pastor from Texas. In Discourse News, Senior Business Anchor Annika Pergament reports on Jankowski's definition of art from her newscaster’s desk at NY1.

In 2007, he presented The living sculptures, a project curated by Ferran Barenblit. Barcelona’s popular boulevard Las Ramblas is lined with street performers who mimic bronze sculptures by standing motionless, covered in metallic paint from head to toe, for the amusement – and spare change – of thousands of tourists. From the many, Jankowski selected three: personifications of Che Guevara, Julius Caesar, and the female figure in Salvador Dalí’s Anthropomorphic Chest of Drawers. Then, with the help of a foundry, the artist produced life-size bronze casts of the three figures – along with their soapbox plinths – and placed them at the same spots where he originally encountered them. The sculptures were installed later in London (Regent's Park), New York (Central Park) and other locations around the world.

Jankowski's installation Strip the Auctioneer (2009) consists of sculpture, photographs and a video connected to a live auction that was orchestrated by the artist in May 2009. The action takes place at Christie's auction house in Amsterdam and incorporates the auctioneer, Amo Verkade, as the desired possession. Verkade bids his garment piece by piece down to his hammer. He strips himself of his suit, baring and transforming those parcels of clothing into objects of desire.

== Exhibitions ==
Jankowski's videos, films, and installations have been exhibited internationally in places such as Contemporary Art Museum St. Louis (2015); Sala de Arte Publico Siqueiros, Mexico City, Mexico (2012), Museum of Contemporary Art of Rome (2012), Nassauischer Kunstverein Wiesbaden (2009); Kunstmuseum Stuttgart (2008); Miami Art Museum, Miami (2007); List Visual Arts Center, Massachusetts (2005); Artpace, San Antonio (2001); and Wadsworth Atheneum, Hartford (2000). The artist participated in the 2002 Whitney Biennial, the 48th Venice Biennale, and the XVI Cuenca Biennale, in Ecuador.

== Notable works ==
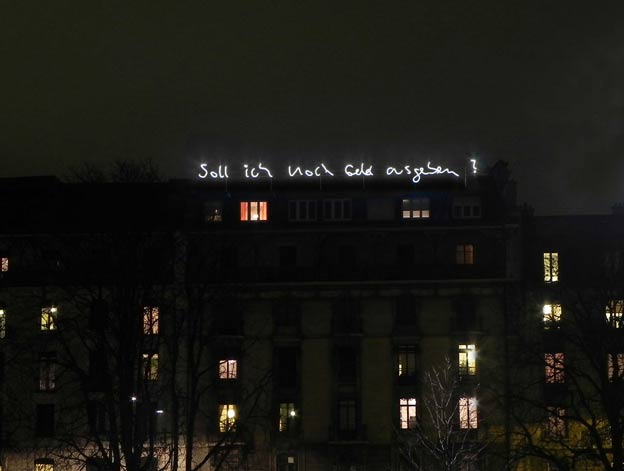
Christian Jankowski, What I Still Have to Take Care of?, Permanent public luminous installation, The Neon Parallax, Geneva

- The Hunt (1992)
- My Life as a Dove (1996)
- Let's get physical/digital (1997–1998)
- Telemistica (1999)
- The Holy Artwork (2001), held in the collection of the Tate Gallery, London.
- Point of Sale (2002), held in the collection of the Institute of Contemporary Art, Boston.
- What I Still Have to Take Care of (2008) permanent neon installation in Geneva, Switzerland.
- Tableaux Vivant TV (2010), produced for the Biennale of Sydney
- The Finest Art on Water (2011), first on show at Frieze Art Fair
- Casting Jesus (2011)
- What I still have to take care of? permanent work, public art collection of Geneva; The Neon Parallax project (2008)

== Quotes ==
In an interview with Phaidon Press ahead of Frieze Art Fair in October 2011 Jankowski said of his new work, 'The Finest Art on Water' "I’m not saying it’s the best investment ever. History will show! If you can afford it and you’ve already spent 65 million then if you spend 75, there’s a chance that this vessel will have a higher value in the future. My artistic career, the next works that I will do, will inform the price of this thing.”
