= Elisabeth Bamberger =

German Jewish businesswoman and art collector (1889–1971)

Elisabeth Bamberger (1889–1971) was a German Jewish women's rights activist and art collector.

== Biography ==
Born in 1889 in Saaz, Bohemia, as the oldest daughter of Joseph and Martha Mendl Elisabeth Bamberger (née Mendl) was involved in the movement for women's rights in Germany, active in the organisations, "Frauenliga fuer Frieden und Freiheit" and the "Weltfriedensbund der Frauen und Muetter." She had four siblings. On March 9, 1912, in Berlin she married Heinrich Bamberger (1871–1934), the son of department store owner Jacob Bamberger and Frieda Strauss. Jacob opened his first clothing store in 1876 in Worms under the name Bamberger & Hertz. The couple had three children. After Jacob's death, his sons successfully expanded the business. Heinrich died in 1934.

== Nazi persecution ==
When the Nazis came to power in Germany in 1933, the entire Bamberger family was persecuted because of their Jewish heritage. Jewish Germans were boycotted and Bamberger was forced to sell the Frankfurt department store Bamberger & Hertz to Peek & Cloppenburg as part of the Aryanization process, which mandated the transfer of property from Jews to non-Jews. She placed her children in a school abroad; her sons Willi later went to Ecuador, Friedel to England and Frank to the USA. She lived in Frankfurt am Main until 1940. Their property was confiscated and they were forced to flee to survive. As a Jew she had to register her assets with the Nazis in 1938.

Before escaping, Bamberger left her belongings for safekeeping at the home of the cantor, Siegfried Würzburger. In 1941, Würzburger and his wife, Gertrude, were deported to the Lódz ghetto, where they perished. The Gestapo seized their property, including Mrs. Bamberger's belongings.

Mrs. Bamberger managed to escape Germany in 1940, traveling from Berlin to Moscow, across Siberia, Manchuria, Korea, and Japan, before arriving in Ecuador. After the war, she began searching for her lost artworks, a mission continued by two generations of Bamberger heirs. Bamberger died in Maryland, USA in November 1971.

Bamberger's sons wrote memoirs which describe the history of the family, including their escape from Nazi Germany. The memoirs are kept at the Leo Baeck Institute.

== Claims for artworks ==
An oil painting from her collection, Bauernhof by Emil Nolde, was found by her children at the Kunsthalle Emden in 1994, and in 2002, the Bamberger family reached a settlement with the Kunsthalle Emden. In the Bamberger collection into the 1930s, its exact itinerary was unknown during the Nazi era when their property was confiscated. After 1964, the painting passed through various galleries, including Aenne Abels and Grosshennig, before being acquired by Henri Nannen in 1979, who later transferred it to his foundation in 1986.

== See also ==
- List of claims for restitution for Nazi-looted art
- The Holocaust
- Nuremberg Laws
