= New Gothic =

Contemporary art movement

New Gothic or Neo-Gothic is a contemporary art movement that emphasizes darkness and horror.

== Manifesto ==
"The Neo Gothic Art Manifesto" was written by Gothic subculture artist Charles Moffat in 2001, who also coined the term in an effort to differentiate it from Gothic architecture. The manifesto was later updated in 2003, but both versions emphasize rebellion against normality.

== Gothic exhibition, Boston 1997 ==
The style may be said to have begun (even if named later) with the "Gothic" exhibition organized by the Institute of Contemporary Art, Boston, curated by Christoph Grunenberg, which took place April 24 – July 6, 1997. This exhibit included work by Jake and Dinos Chapman, Mike Kelley, Gregory Crewdson, Robert Gober, Jim Hodges, Douglas Gordon, Abigail Lane, Tony Oursler, Alexis Rockman, and Cindy Sherman.

== Francesca Gavin's reformulation ==
Gavin's 2008 book Hell Bound: New Gothic Art continued to theorize the existence of the movement. She has also referred to the style as "the art of fear". The term is associated with work by Banks Violette, David Noonan and Gabríela Friðriksdóttir, in particular, as well as Christian Jankowski, Marnie Weber, Boo Saville, Terence Koh, and Matthew Stone. Gavin also includes Olaf Breuning, Tal R, Dr Lakra, Abdul Vas, Joss McKinley, Jonathan Meese, Raymond Pettibon, Sue Webster, and Ricky Swallow. The artists involved often take inspiration from extreme metal, hardcore punk, motorcycle clubs, pornography, slasher films, and other elements of popular culture.

== See also ==
- Body horror
- Drone metal
- Gothic fashion
- Goth subculture
- New French Extremity
- Postmodern art
- Shock art
- Transgressive art
- Young British Artists

== Bibliography ==
- Gavin, Francesca. Hell Bound: New Gothic Art. London: Laurence King Publishing, 2008.
- Grunenberg, Christoph, ed. Gothic: Transmutations of Horror in Late Twentieth Century Art. Cambridge: MIT Press, 1997.
- Steele, Valerie and Jennifer Park, Gothic: Dark Glamour, Yale University Press and the Fashion Institute of Technology New York, 2008.
