= Moore Building =

- U.S. National Register of Historic Places
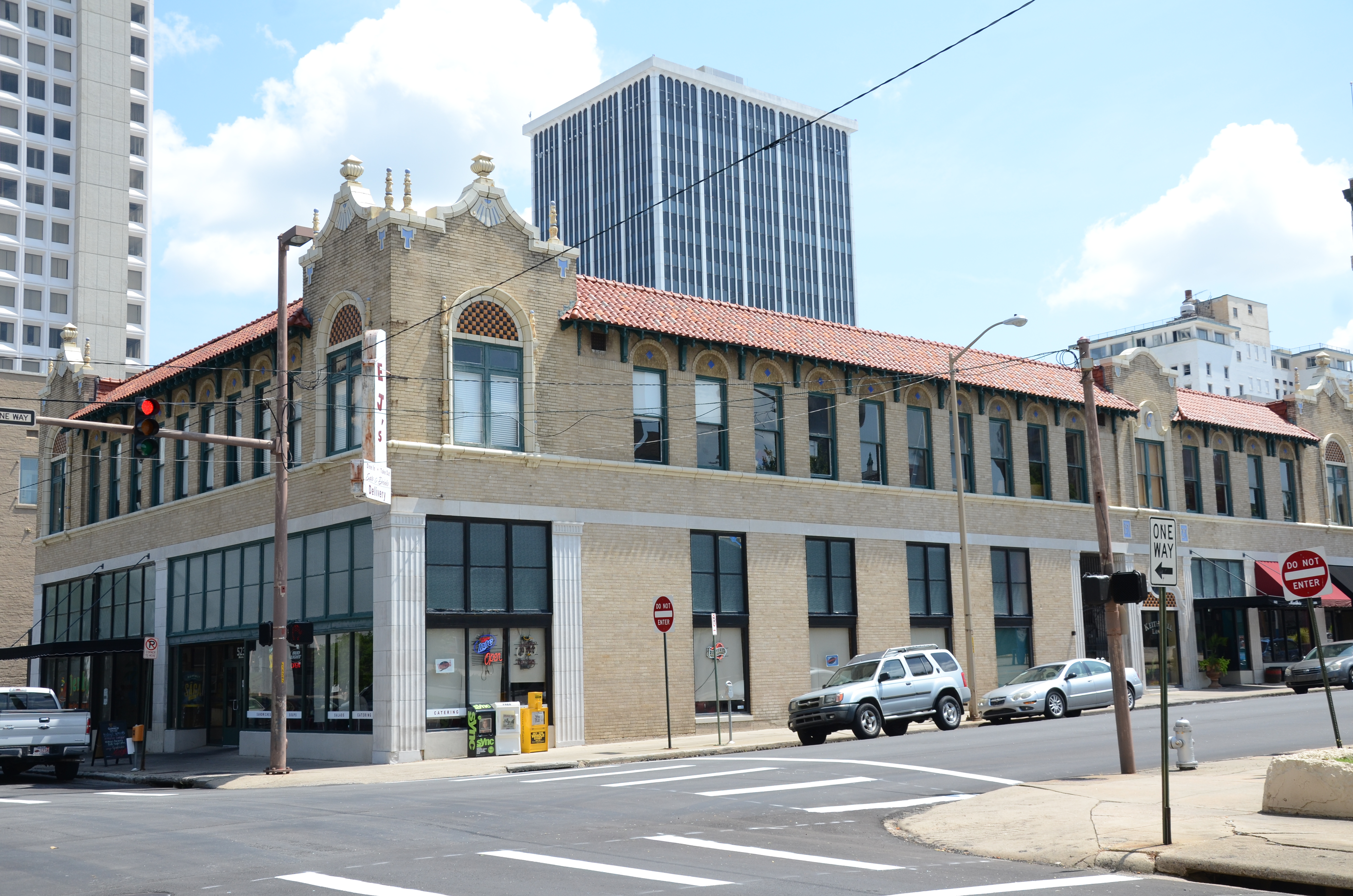

- Location within Arkansas Location within the United States
- Location: 519-523 Center St., Little Rock, Arkansas
- Coordinates: 34°44′37″N 92°16′27″W
- Area: less than one acre
- Built: 1929
- Architect: Thompson, Sanders & Ginocchio
- Architectural style: Mission/Spanish revival
- MPS: Thompson, Charles L., Design Collection TR
- NRHP reference No.: 86002894
- Added to NRHP: October 23, 1986

The Moore Building is a historic commercial building at 519-23 Center Street in Little Rock, Arkansas. It is a two-story brick building with Mission Revival styling, designed by Thompson, Sanders & Ginocchio and built in 1929. It has an orange tile parapet roof, with parapetted corners, and periodic use of decorative tiles and terra cotta panels on its two street-facing facades.

The building was listed on the National Register of Historic Places in 1986.

== See also ==
- National Register of Historic Places listings in Little Rock, Arkansas
