= Kunsthalle Emden =

German art museum

Coordinates: 53°22′11″N 7°12′12″E

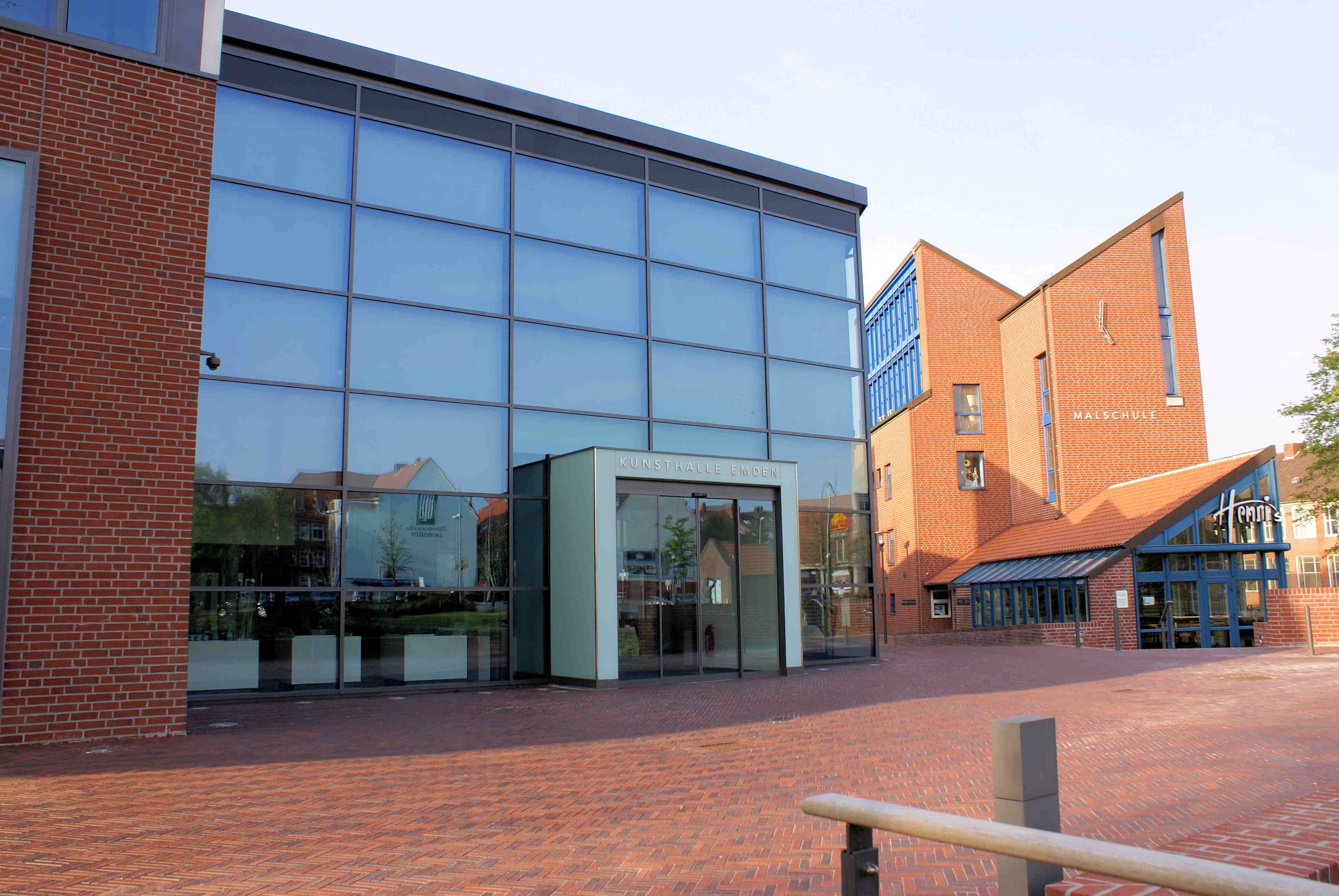

Kunsthalle Emden (Henri and Eske Nannen Foundation, Donation Otto Van de loo) is a German art museum in Emden in East Frisia, Germany.

The museum's collections include more than 1,500 works.

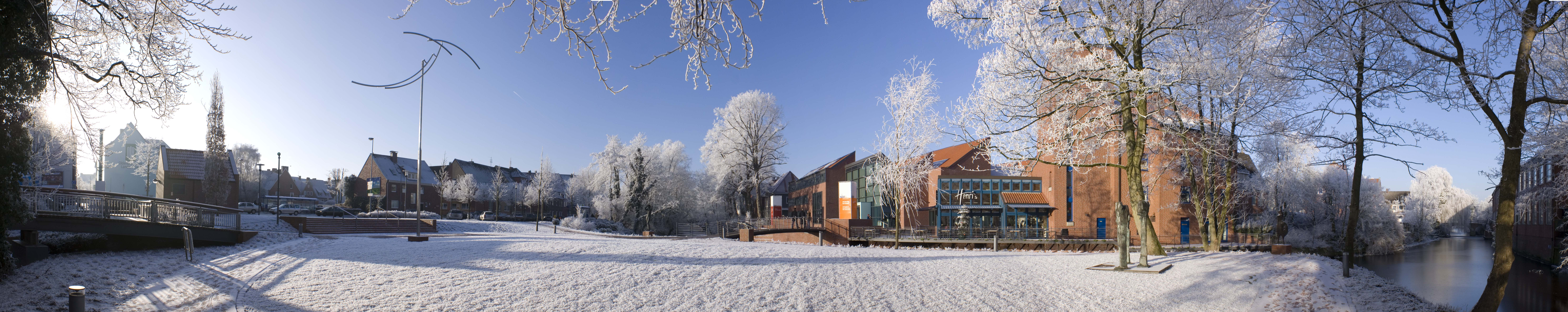
The Kunsthalle in December 2007.

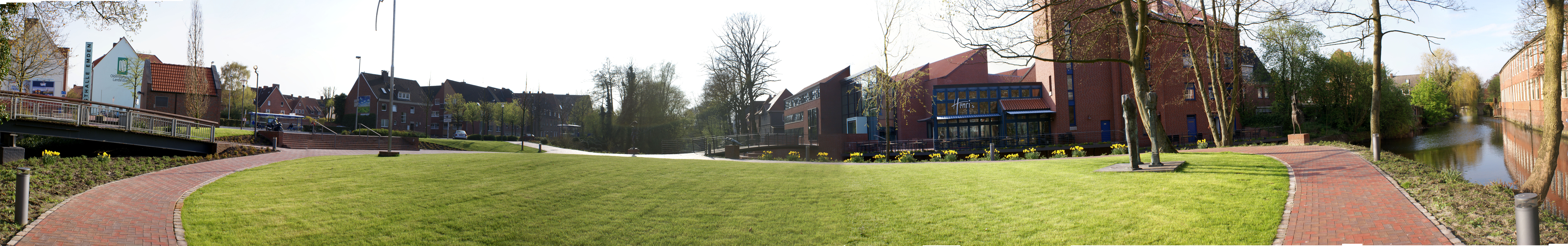
The Kunsthalle in April 2008.

== History ==
In 1986, Henri Nannen (1913–1996) commissioned a building for his collection of 20th-century art in Emden, his home town. The core of the collection includes German Expressionism with works by Nolde, Macke and Kokoschka. In October 2000 the Munich art dealer and collector Otto van de Loo donated his collection to Kunsthalle Emden.

== Provenance research and collection ==
Provenance research into the Nannen donation pointed to some problematic artworks. An artwork from the Ismar Littmann art collection, which had confiscated by the Gestapo, was restituted.

In 2002 a settlement was reached with the heirs of Elisabeth Bamberger concerning the painting Bauernhof by Emil Nolde. In fleeing Nazi Germany, Bamberger had placed her painting for safekeeping with her cantor, Mr. Wurzburger, who, along with his wife, was murdered by Nazis in the Holocaust and their possessions seized by the Gestapo. The reappeared in the Kuntshalle in Emden, where" it arrived as a bequest from the Henri Nannen Foundation".

== See also ==
- Kunsthalle
