= Trolley Gallery =

Coordinates: 51.5245°N 0.0739°W

Trolley Gallery is a contemporary art gallery in Shoreditch, east London, which emerged independently and alongside the already established Trolley Books in 2003. The gallery exhibits the work of new, emerging artists and is often host to first solo shows. The gallery's directors were Hannah Watson and founder Gigi Giannuzzi, who died in 2013.

Trolley Gallery took part in the Zoo Art Fair 2004, 2005, 2006 and 2007.
