= Nicholas Forrest =

Nicholas Forrest (born 1983) is a Sydney/London based antique and art market analyst, consultant and writer. He has earned a BA (Art History and Criticism) degree and has completed post graduate study in the area of art authentication. Forrest is the current editor of the Blouin Artinfo Australia site.

== Biography ==
Forrest is the founder and writer of the Art Market Blog and works as a freelance art and antique market commentator. He has been published in a number of magazines including The Art Investor, Graal Magazine, Art Etc., Australian Art Collector, Fabrik Magazine and Art and Investment magazine. Forrest also writes for many websites including ArteryNYC, Worthpoint UK, Artinfo Australia, and Saatchi Online and has made several radio appearances (both nationally and internationally) as an art market expert and has in turn received press from the likes of The New York Times, Conde Nast Portfolio, and Times of London.
