= The Holy Bible (album) =

Studio album by Manic Street Preachers
- Released: 29 August 1994
- Recorded: January–May 1994
- Studios: Sound Space Studios in Cardiff, Wales
- Genres: Alternative rock; post-punk; hard rock; punk rock; gothic rock; glam punk
- Length: 56:05
- Label: Epic
- Producers: Manic Street Preachers; Steve Brown

Manic Street Preachers chronology
Gold Against the Soul (1993)	The Holy Bible (1994)	Everything Must Go (1996)

Singles from The Holy Bible
- 1. "Faster" Released: 31 May 1994; 2. "Revol" Released: 1 August 1994; 3. "She Is Suffering" Released: 3 October 1994

The Holy Bible is the third studio album by Welsh alternative rock band Manic Street Preachers, released on 29 August 1994 by Epic Records. While the album was being written and recorded, lyricist and rhythm guitarist Richey Edwards was struggling with severe depression, alcohol abuse, self-harm and anorexia nervosa, and its contents are considered by many sources to reflect his mental state. The songs focus on themes relating to politics and human suffering. The Holy Bible was the band's last album released before Edwards' disappearance on 1 February 1995, consequently becoming their last studio album as a four-piece band.

Although it reached number 6 in the UK Albums Chart, initially, global sales were disappointing compared to previous albums and the record did not chart in mainland Europe or North America. It was promoted with tours and festival appearances in the UK, Ireland, Germany, Portugal, the Netherlands and Thailand – in part without Edwards. The Holy Bible received widespread acclaim from critics and has sold over half a million copies worldwide as of 2014. It has frequently been featured and listed highly on lists of the best albums of all time by British music publications such as Melody Maker, NME and Q.

== Recording ==
According to drummer Sean Moore, the band felt they had been "going a bit astray" with their previous album, 1993's Gold Against the Soul, and so the approach to the follow-up was for the band to go back to their "grass roots" and rediscover "a little bit of Britishness that we lacked". Singer and guitarist James Dean Bradfield recalls the band feeling they had become "a bit too rockist [...] we had lost our direction". After the band's first two albums had been dominated by influences such as Guns N' Roses and Alice in Chains, the band decided that the new material should be influenced by the artists that inspired them when they first formed, including Magazine, Wire, Skids, Public Image Ltd, Gang of Four, Joy Division, Siouxsie and the Banshees, and early Simple Minds.

Epic Records had proposed that the album be recorded in Barbados, but the band had wanted to avoid what Bradfield called "all that decadent rockstar rubbish". It was bassist Nicky Wire's idea, says Bradfield, that the band "should not use everything at its disposal" in recording the album. Instead, recording began with sound engineer Alex Silva at the low-rent, "absolutely tiny" Sound Space Studios in Cardiff. The album was mixed by Mark Freegard, who had previously worked with the Breeders. "She Is Suffering" was produced by Steve Brown. The recording took four weeks.

Bradfield has described the recording of the album as preventing him from having a social life and Alex Silva attributes the break-up of his relationship with his girlfriend at the time to the long hours involved in the recording. Guitarist Richey Edwards attended recording sessions but would, according to Wire, "collapse on the settee and have a snooze" while the other band members did all the recording. He was drinking heavily and frequently crying. "Inevitably", says Bradfield, "the day would start with a 'schhht!'; the sound of a can opening."

The album was constructed with "academic discipline", according to Bradfield, with the band working to headings and structures "so each song is like an essay".

== Content ==
=== Lyrics ===
"Faster"
The album's first single, it features a distant, cold voice and a heavy sound.

Whereas lyric-writing on the two previous albums was split fairly evenly between Richey Edwards and Nicky Wire, the lyrics on The Holy Bible were 70–75% written by Edwards, according to James Dean Bradfield. At the time of the album's 10th anniversary reissue Wire claimed to be largely responsible for "Ifwhiteamericatoldthetruthforonedayit'sworldwouldfallapart" (which cites the actor River Phoenix in the lines 'Big Mac / Smack / Phoenix, R. / Please smile, y'all') and "This Is Yesterday", contributing only titles to some of the other songs. However, on later inspection of his notebooks, Wire was surprised to find he had contributed more lyrics than he had previously remembered, having also written portions of "Of Walking Abortion" and "Mausoleum" and some lines from "Faster". He now believed himself responsible for around 30% of the words on the album.

The album's lyrics deal with subjects including prostitution, American consumerism, British imperialism, freedom of speech, the Holocaust, self-starvation, serial killers, the death penalty, political revolution, childhood, fascism and suicide. According to Q: "the tone of the album is by turns bleak, angry and resigned". The same magazine commented in 1994 that "even a cursory glance at the titles will confirm that this is not the new Gloria Estefan album".

Sean Moore has described the content of the lyrics as being "as far as Richey's character could go". According to Bradfield: "Some of the lyrics confused me. Some [...] were voyeuristic and some were coming from personal experience [...] I remember getting the lyrics to 'Yes' and thinking 'You crazy fucker, how do I write music for this?'" Critic Simon Price notes that the potential radio-friendliness of the song is undermined by its focus on the subject of prostitution and the recurrence of sexual swearing in the lyric.

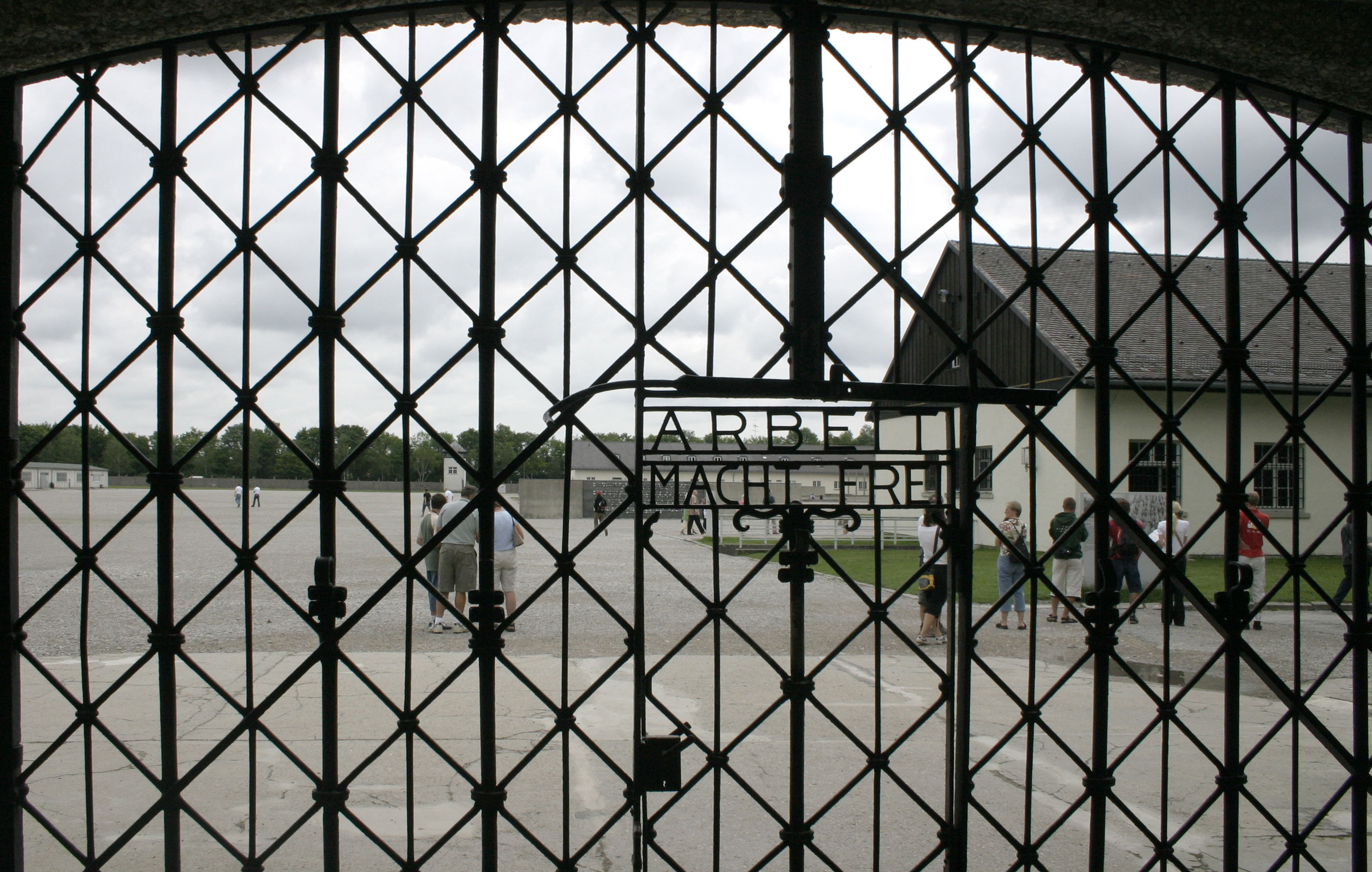
One of the inspirations for the lyrics on the album was a band visit to Dachau concentration camp. A photograph of this gate features in the album's artwork.

Interviewed at the time of the album's release, Nicky Wire said that the track "Ifwhiteamericatoldthetruthforonedayit'sworldwouldfallapart" was "not a completely anti-American song", but instead was about "how the most empty culture in the world can dominate in such a total sense". The title of the song has been repeatedly attributed to Lenny Bruce without any clear source for this claim given. It is possible that an error of attribution has arisen as a result of the band's discussion around Bruce, free speech and 'PCP'.

"Of Walking Abortion" is about right-wing totalitarianism, of which Wire commented: "there's a worm in human nature that makes us want to be dominated". "Archives of Pain", dealing with the glorification of serial killers and seemingly advocating capital punishment, he said "was the song that me and Richey worried about most [...] the song isn't a right-wing statement, it's just against this fascination with people who kill". Later in 1994, Bradfield described the song as "one of the most important things we've done" but said it was also "very right-wing" and "miscalculated".

Wire described "Revol" as being about Edwards' idea that "relationships in politics, and relationships in general, are failures". "P.C.P.", he said, was about how "PC followers take up the idea of being liberal but end up being quite the opposite". He said that he was "completely confused" by "Faster" (some of which he had written), although Edwards had told him that it was about self-abuse.

"Mausoleum" and "The Intense Humming of Evil", Wire said, were both inspired by visits by the band to former concentration camps at Dachau and Belsen. A first draft of the latter song had been considered insufficiently judgemental by Bradfield, who had asked for a re-write ("you can't be ambivalent about the Holocaust").

According to Wire, "Die in the Summertime" and "4st 7lb" were "pretty obviously about Richey's state of mind". However, Edwards attested that the former song is actually about a pensioner wanting to die with memories of childhood in his mind. 4 stone 7 pounds (29 kg) is the weight below which death is reputed to become medically unavoidable for anorexics.

"This Is Yesterday", according to Wire, is "about how people always look back to their youth and look on it as a glorious period".

Wire and Bradfield have both expressed a disliking for the lyrics to the song "She Is Suffering", Wire saying it suffers from "man-coming-to-the-rescue syndrome". According to Edwards, the "she" in the song title is desire: "In other Bibles and Holy Books no truth is possible until you empty yourself of desire".

==== Use of dialogue samples ====
Several tracks on the album are also complemented by samples of dialogue, in keeping with the themes of the songs themselves, as follows:

- "Yes" contains dialogue from the 1993 documentary Hookers, Hustlers, Pimps and their Johns, by Beeban Kidron, about the prostitution trade.
- "Ifwhiteamericatoldthetruthforonedayit'sworldwouldfallapart" begins with a TV trailer for GOP TV's Rising Tide show.
- "Of Walking Abortion" begins with an extract from an interview with Hubert Selby Jr.
- "She is Suffering" on the US mix of the album begins with a sample of British scientist/philosopher John G. Bennett saying "It is impossible to achieve the aim without suffering." This dialogue, previously featured on the title track to the 1979 Robert Fripp album Exposure, is not present on the standard album/single version of the song.
- "Archives of Pain" begins with the words of the mother of one of serial killer Peter Sutcliffe's victims from a TV report on his trial.
- "4st 7lb" begins with dialogue from the 1994 documentary about anorexia, Caraline's Story, by Jeremy Llewelyn-Jones about Caraline Neville-Lister.
- "Mausoleum" features a quotation from an interview with J. G. Ballard explaining his motivation for writing the novel Crash.
- "Faster" begins with dialogue from the 1984 film adaptation of George Orwell's Nineteen Eighty-Four, spoken by John Hurt.
- "The Intense Humming of Evil" begins with an extract from a report on the Nuremberg Trials.
- "P.C.P." ends with dialogue spoken by Albert Finney from Peter Yates' The Dresser.

=== Musical style ===
Musically, The Holy Bible marks a shift from the modern rock sound of their first two albums, Generation Terrorists and Gold Against the Soul. It was described as alternative rock, post-punk, hard rock, punk rock, gothic rock, and glam punk, with influences from British punk, new wave, industrial and art rock. During the recording of the album, the band was mainly influenced by post-punk bands such as Wire, Public Image Ltd, and Joy Division, and their new sound drew comparisons to similar artists such as Magazine, Siouxsie and the Banshees, and Gang of Four.

The Jam was another influence; "This Is Yesterday" was inspired by the songs "In the Crowd" (1978) and "Ghosts" (1982), while the anorexia-themed "4st 7lb" featured a guitar riff influenced by "The Eton Rifles" (1979). "Of Walking Abortion" was described as a "punk metal assault" and was inspired by Magazine's "The Light Pours Out of Me" (1978), while "From Out of Nowhere" (1989) by Faith No More served as the template for "Faster". The latter and "Archives of Pain" have also been compared to the Buzzcocks and even heavy metal trailblazers Black Sabbath in what Louder than War described as "their hook-laden heaviness". The record's heavy style was also compared to that of popular industrial rock act Nine Inch Nails.

=== Aesthetic ===
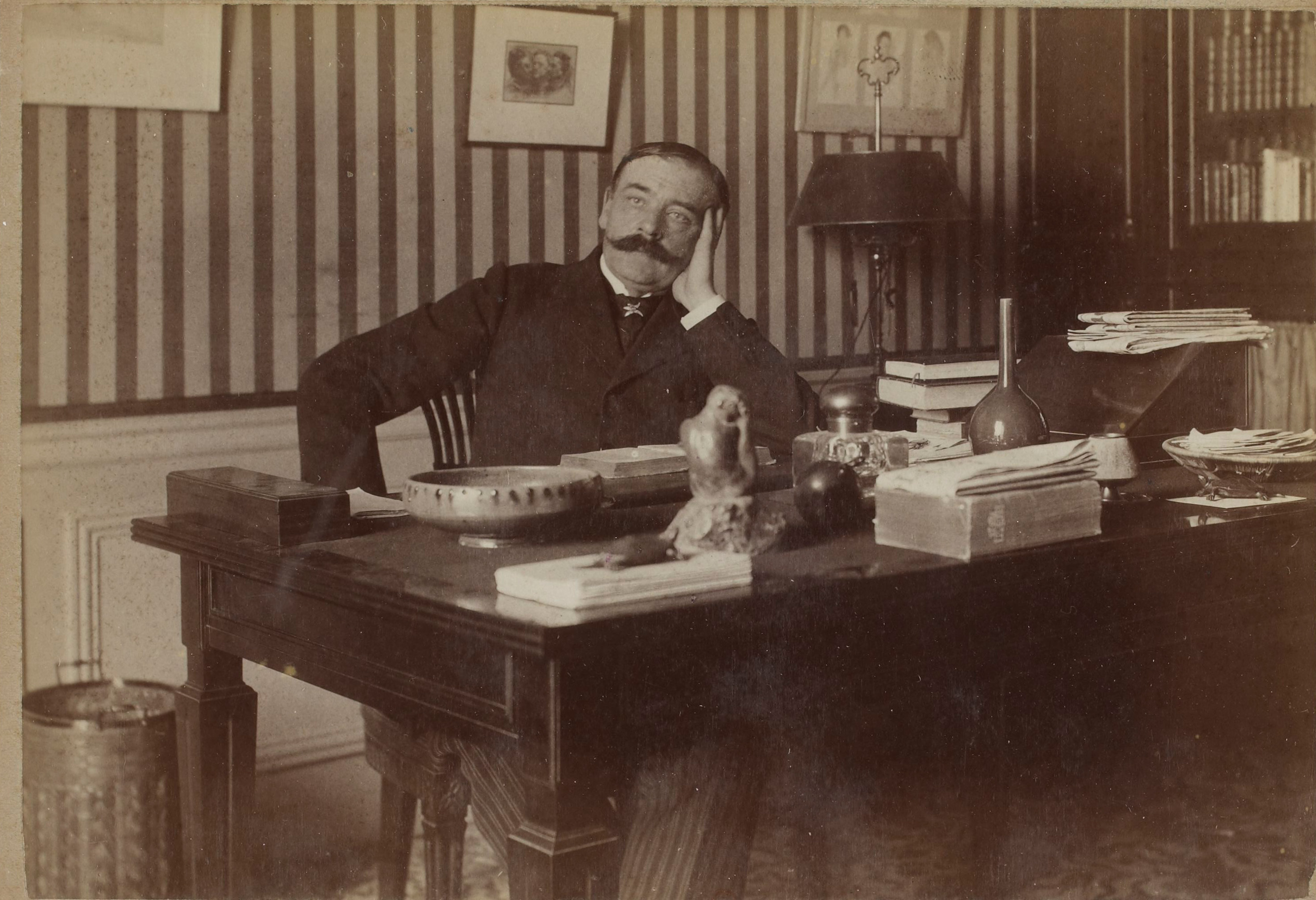
French avant-garde writer Octave Mirbeau, quoted on the sleeve of The Holy Bible

James Dean Bradfield has described the album as representing "the most definitive period for us visually as well as the songs we were writing and the record [...] we've never been scared to admit that".

While touring in early 1994, the band visited army surplus stores and bought clothing to wear on stage, in an homage to The Clash. This military image was used consistently by the band during the promotion of The Holy Bible, including in their videos and television appearances. A performance of "Faster" on the BBC's Top of the Pops in June 1994 resulted in a record number of complaints—over 25,000—due to Bradfield wearing a paramilitary-style balaclava.

The album cover, designed by Richey Edwards while hospitalised, features a triptych by Jenny Saville depicting three perspectives on the body of an obese woman in her underwear, and is titled Strategy (South Face/Front Face/North Face). Saville gave her permission for use of her work for free after a discussion with Edwards in which he described each song on the album. The back cover features a photo of the band in military uniforms and a quote taken from Octave Mirbeau's book The Torture Garden. This album is also the first instance of the Manic Street Preachers using Gill Sans typeface with a reversed "R" in their album art. The typeface would be re-used on later albums and has become an easily recognised motif of the Manics' artwork. The typeface is similar to one used on Empires and Dance by Simple Minds, one of James Dean Bradfield's favourite records.

The lyrics booklet features various images including Christian iconography, photographs of the gate at Dachau concentration camp and a plan of the gas chambers at Belsen concentration camp, a photograph of Lenin's corpse, an engraving depicting an execution by guillotine in Revolutionary France, a picture of an apple, a photograph of a woman with a parasitic twin, photographs of each of the Manic Street Preachers as children and a photograph of a group of British policemen in gas-masks. The booklet also contains a Buddhist saying from the Tripitaka alongside a dedication to the band's publicist, Philip Hall, who had died of cancer in 1993.

The title "The Holy Bible" was chosen by Edwards to reflect an idea, according to Bradfield, that "everything on there has to be perfection". Interviewed at the end of 1994, Edwards said: "The way religions choose to speak their truth to the public has always been to beat them down [...] I think that if a Holy Bible is true, it should be about the way the world is and that's what I think my lyrics are about. [The album] doesn't pretend things don't exist".

== Health of Richey Edwards ==
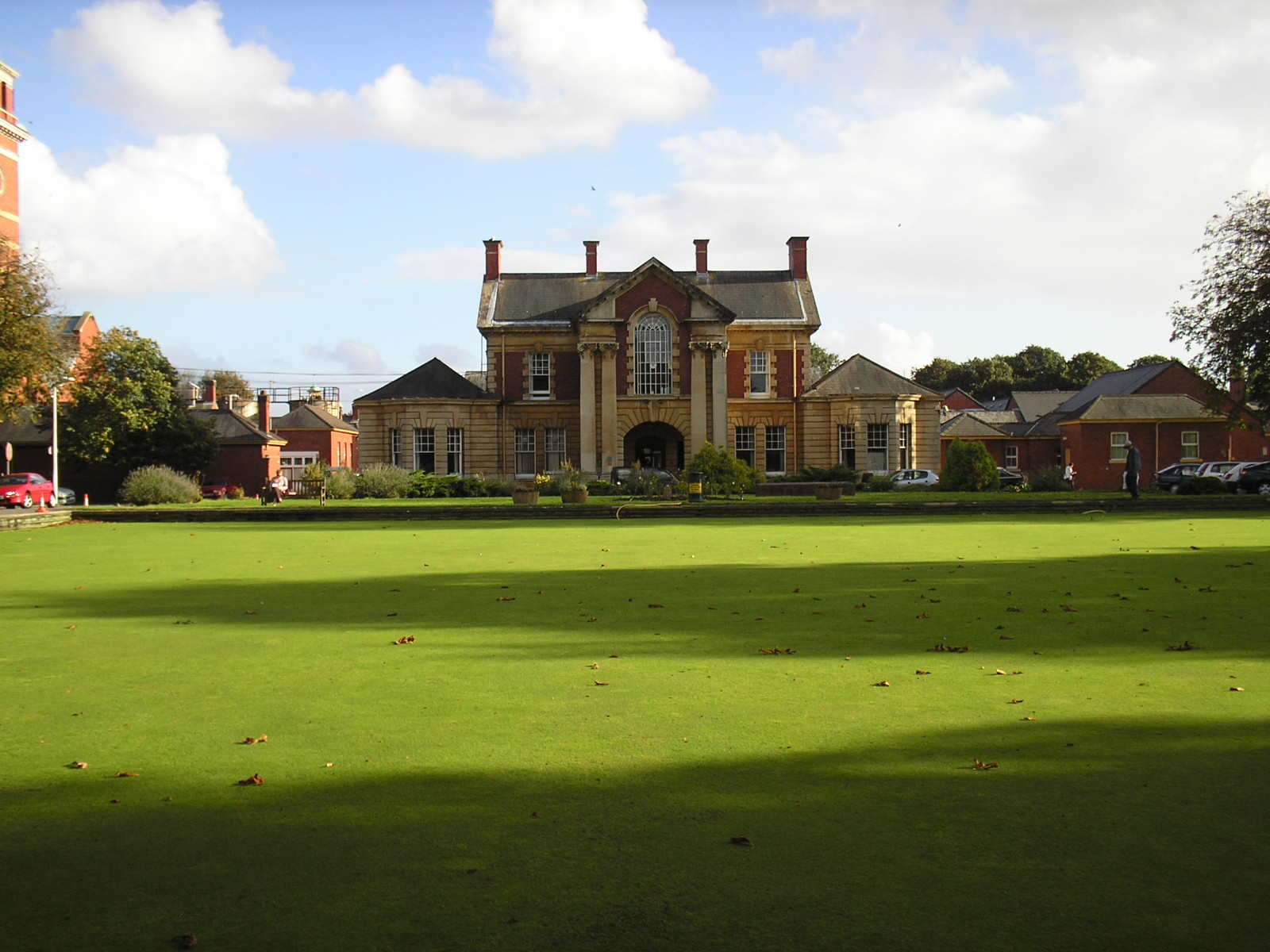
Whitchurch Hospital, Cardiff

"4st 7lb"
Many songs, like this one, reflect Richey's mental state. "4st 7lb" is about one of Richey's conditions, anorexia.

Richey Edwards had long-term problems with alcohol abuse, depression and self-harm. During 1994, these problems had, according to Wire, "escalated to a point where everybody got a bit frightened" and Edwards had also begun to suffer from anorexia nervosa. During April and May, when the band played concerts in Thailand and Portugal, Edwards was habitually cutting himself and appeared onstage in Bangkok with self-inflicted wounds across his chest.

He talked openly in the music press about his problems, telling the NME: "When I cut myself I feel so much better. All the little things that might have been annoying me seem so trivial because I'm concentrating on the pain", and "I'm the sort of person who wakes up in the morning and needs to pour a bottle down my throat".

His problems continued and, during the recording of the album, his mental state deteriorated after learning of the suicide of a close friend from university. In July, he was taken to hospital after severely lacerating himself at home, then transferred to Whitchurch Hospital, an NHS psychiatric facility in Cardiff. His weight had fallen to 6 stone (38 kg).

By the time of the album's release in late August 1994, the band played as a trio at the Reading Festival while Edwards was hospitalised at the private Priory Hospital in Roehampton. He rejoined the band to tour during the autumn of 1994. Other band members felt that his drinking was under control at this point, but his eating continued to be a problem and he continued to self-harm. On 1 February 1995, he disappeared and is presumed to have taken his own life. His car was found close to the Severn Bridge.

The Holy Bible has been described by Q as a "graphic, violent torrent of self-lacerating punk fury which infamously details the horrors in Richey Edwards' head". Tom Ewing of Freaky Trigger once said: "Writing about The Holy Bible without somehow addressing the vanishing of Richey Edwards would be pointless: you would only be tracing his outline as you gradually and gingerly tiptoed around it."

== Release ==
The album was released as a vinyl 12" picture disc, CD and minidisc. It reached No. 6 on the UK Albums Chart, remaining in the Top 100 for 11 weeks. Despite not charting outside the UK and Japan, by mid-2014 The Holy Bible had sold more than 600,000 copies worldwide.

On 6 December 2004 an expanded version of The Holy Bible was released, containing two CDs and a DVD. Disc one comprised a digitally re-mastered version of the original album plus four live tracks. The DVD features an interview with the band, footage of TV and festival appearances and promo videos. The second disc includes a remix of the album by Tom Lord-Alge. The remixed version had been intended for release in the US, but this never happened "for well-documented reasons", according to James Dean Bradfield. The band felt it was superior to the version originally released. As Bradfield puts it: "For once we got something back from the American record company—who we despised—and it was brilliant".

A new special edition entitled The Holy Bible 20 was released in December 2014, commemorating the 20th anniversary of the album. This edition includes the vinyl edition of the full album, plus a four-CD set, the first CD with the full album remastered for the special release, the second with the US mix remastered, the third includes B-sides of the album's singles and a fourth disc including a performance at the Astoria in 1994 and an acoustic session for Radio 4 Mastertapes in 2014. The special edition also contains a 40-page book full of rare photos and handwritten lyrics and notes by Richey and by the band.

As part of Record Store Day 2014 a 12-inch picture disc of the US mix of the album was released. Side A featured a mix of the Revol cover overlaid with the Jesus image from the CD. Side B was a white label image. The album was housed in a clear plastic sleeve. 1,500 copies were pressed.

== Reception ==
Professional ratings
Initial reviews (in 1994)
Review scores
Source	Rating
Music Week	5/5 stars
NME	9/10
Select	4/5
Smash Hits	5/5 stars

Professional ratings
Retrospective reviews (after 1994)
Review scores
Source	Rating
AllMusic	4.5/5 stars
Blender	4/5 stars
Mojo	4/5 stars
Pitchfork	8.4/10
Q	4/5 stars
Rolling Stone	4/5 stars
Stylus Magazine	A
Uncut	4/5 stars

Despite not charting in mainland Europe, and not selling very well initially, The Holy Bible received widespread acclaim from music critics upon release. Simon Williams of NME saw The Holy Bible as primarily the work of James Dean Bradfield, saying "The Holy Bible isn't elegant, but it is bloody effective". Melody Maker, which regarded the album as primarily the work of Richey Edwards, described it as "the sound of a group in extremis [...] hurtling towards a private armageddon". Observed Roy Wilkinson in Select: "Amid all the references to coma, carcasses, 'walking abortions' and dying in the summer sits the spectre of Richey, holed up in a private clinic, having drunk too much, eaten too little and cut himself for reasons varying between dramatic gesture, a surrogate for screaming out loud and something 'sexual' [...] Let's hope that, with a record of such unsettling, morbid resonance as The Holy Bible, no further gestures are required."

In a retrospective review, Stephen Thomas Erlewine of AllMusic gave The Holy Bible four and a half stars out of five and called it "Richey James' last will and testament." He concluded, "Every song has a passage frightening in its imagery. Although the music itself isn't as scarily intense, its tight, terse hard rock and glam hooks accentuate the paranoia behind the songs, making the lyrics cut deeper." Upon its re-release 10 years later, Dan Martin of NME described The Holy Bible as "a work of genuine genius". Joe Tangari of Pitchfork wrote, "In a way, the story of Edwards' spiral into some unknown oblivion is tied to the experience of The Holy Bible, which in retrospect has become a sort of horror-show eulogy for a man who couldn't live with the world around him." David Fricke of Rolling Stone wrote that "even the pall of [Edwards'] absence can't cancel out the life-affirming force that hits you with the very first song".

Mark Edwards of Stylus Magazine opined that "The Holy Bible is easily one of the best albums of the 90s—ignored by many, but loved intensely by the few who've lived with it over the years [...] It puts everything the Manics have done since to shame, not to mention nearly everything else [in music]". Nick Butler of Sputnikmusic dubbed it a "classic" and concluded, "Punk, hard rock, indie, and even metal fans owe it to themselves to hear this. Anyone else may be scared off, but may just find they never look at life the same way again. I certainly haven't."

== Touring ==
In April and May 1994 the band first performed songs from The Holy Bible at concerts in Thailand and Portugal and at a benefit concert for the Anti-Nazi League at Brockwell Park, London. In June, they played the Glastonbury Festival.

In July and August, without Richey Edwards, they played T in the Park in Scotland, the Alte Wartesaal in Cologne, the Parkpop Festival in The Hague and the Reading Festival. During September, October and December there was a headline tour of the UK and Ireland and two tours in mainland Europe with Suede and Therapy? In December, three nights at the London Astoria ended with the band smashing up their equipment and the venue's lighting rig, causing £26,000 worth of damage.

James Dean Bradfield and Richey Edwards were due to fly to the United States for media interviews on 1 February 1995, the day of Edwards' disappearance, and Bradfield ended up doing this alone. Concerts in US cities as well as in Prague and Vienna had been scheduled for March and April 1995, but were cancelled.

In late 2014 the band performed the album in full for the first time, at concerts in Glasgow, Manchester, Dublin and London, marking the 20th anniversary of its release. Following the UK concerts, the Manics took The Holy Bible tour to North America, and in April 2015 the band played in Washington DC, Toronto, New York, Boston, San Francisco, Los Angeles and Chicago. They also played in the Cardiff Castle with 10,000 fans attending the gig, it was broadcast nationwide by BBC Two Wales.

== Legacy ==
The Holy Bible has continued to be acclaimed in the years since its release, with many British music magazines listing it as one of the best albums of the 1990s and one of the greatest ever released.

The writers of Melody Maker ranked it 15th on its list of the top 100 albums of all time in 2000, and Kerrang! placed it 10th in a similar list five years later. It has also remained popular with the British public – in 2005 it topped a BBC Newsnight poll of viewers' favourite albums. Readers of Q voted it as the 10th best album released during the magazine's lifetime in 2001 and as the 18th greatest album ever in 2003.

In 2011 NME ranked it number 1 in their "50 Darkest Albums Ever" list. The same magazine placed the album at number 5 in their end of the year list of the best albums of 1994. In 2003 it was voted on number 37 on NME's poll of best albums of all time and, more recently, number 44 in their list of the 500 greatest albums ever made. The album is also featured in The Guardian's list "1000 Albums You Must Hear Before You Die". At the NME awards 2015, the album won "Reissue of the Year" for its 20th anniversary edition.

Ben Patashnik of Drowned in Sound later said that, at the time of its release, the album "didn't sell very well, but its impact was felt keenly by anyone who'd ever come into contact with the Manics", and that it is now a "masterpiece [...] the sound of one man in a close-knit group of friends slowly disintegrating and using his own anguish to create some of the most brilliant art to be released on a large scale as music in years [...] It's not a suicide note; it's a warning."

The album is also included in the book 1001 Albums You Must Hear Before You Die.

A 2017 collection by Repeater Books, entitled "Triptych", "consider(s) The Holy Bible from three separate, intersecting angles, combining the personal with the political, history with memory, and popular accessibility with intellectual attention to the album’s depth and complexity."

== Track listing ==
All lyrics are written by Richey Edwards (credited as Richey James) and Nicky Wire; all music is composed by James Dean Bradfield and Sean Moore.

No.	Title	Length
1.	"Yes"	4:59
2.	"Ifwhiteamericatoldthetruthforonedayit'sworldwouldfallapart"	3:39
3.	"Of Walking Abortion"	4:00
4.	"She Is Suffering"	4:43
5.	"Archives of Pain"	5:28
6.	"Revol"	3:04
7.	"4st 7lb"	5:04
8.	"Mausoleum"	4:12
9.	"Faster"	3:53
10.	"This Is Yesterday"	3:56
11.	"Die in the Summertime"	3:05
12.	"The Intense Humming of Evil"	6:11
13.	"P.C.P."	3:55

Japanese bonus tracks
No.	Title	Length
14.	"Drug, Drug, Druggy" (live at Glastonbury Festival, June 24, 1994; 1994 edition)	3:27
15.	"Roses in the Hospital" (live at Glastonbury Festival, June 24, 1994; 1994 edition)	4:46
16.	"You Love Us" (live at Glastonbury Festival, June 24, 1994; 1994 edition)	3:05
17.	"New Art Riot" (live at Clapham Grand, March 2, 1994; 1998 edition)	3:00

10th Anniversary Edition bonus tracks
No.	Title	Length
14.	"The Intense Humming of Evil" (live)	4:58
15.	"4st 7lb" (live)	4:44
16.	"Yes" (live)	4:30
17.	"Of Walking Abortion" (live)	3:47

10th Anniversary Edition bonus disc: US album mix plus demos and radio sessions
No.	Title	Length
1.	"Yes"	5:19
2.	"Ifwhiteamericatoldthetruthforonedayit'sworldwouldfallapart"	3:43
3.	"Of Walking Abortion"	4:07
4.	"She Is Suffering"	4:57
5.	"Archives of Pain"	5:30
6.	"Revol"	3:05
7.	"4st 7lb"	5:10
8.	"Mausoleum"	4:13
9.	"Faster"	3:53
10.	"This Is Yesterday"	3:58
11.	"Die in the Summertime"	3:07
12.	"The Intense Humming of Evil"	6:14
13.	"P.C.P"	3:57
14.	"Die in the Summertime" (demo)	2:26
15.	"Mausoleum" (demo)	3:29
16.	"Of Walking Abortion" (Radio 1 Evening Session)	3:39
17.	"She Is Suffering" (Radio 1 Evening Session)	4:25
18.	"Yes" (Radio 1 Evening Session)	4:40

20th Anniversary Limited Edition bonus disc: B Sides and Remixes
No.	Title	Length
1.	"Sculpture of Man"	1:54
2.	"New Art Riot" (in E minor live from Clapham Grand)	3:01
3.	"Too Cold Here"	3:36
4.	"You Love Us" (Heavenly version)	4:28
5.	"Love's Sweet Exile" (live from Bangkok)	3:06
6.	"Drug Drug Druggy" (live at the Glastonbury Festival)	3:28
7.	"Roses in the Hospital" (live at the Glastonbury Festival)	4:47
8.	"You Love Us" (live at the Glastonbury Festival)	3:05
9.	"Love Torn Us Under"	3:43
10.	"The Drowners" (live from Clapham Grand)	3:18
11.	"Stay with Me" (live from Clapham Grand)	3:38
12.	"La Tristesse Durera (Scream to a Sigh)" (vocal mix)	6:05
13.	"La Tristesse Durera (Scream to a Sigh)" (dub mix)	5:50
14.	"Faster" (dub mix)	6:42
15.	"Faster" (vocal mix)	5:47
16.	"Revol" (previously unreleased)	3:14

20th Anniversary Limited Edition bonus disc: BBC: In Concert and Live from Astoria in 1994
No.	Title	Length
1.	"P.C.P"	3:48
2.	"From Despair to Where"	3:22
3.	"Yes"	4:37
4.	"Faster"	3:36
5.	"She Is Suffering"	4:21
6.	"La Tristesse Durera (Scream to a Sigh)"	3:56
7.	"Slash 'n' Burn"	3:32
8.	"Motorcycle Emptiness"	5:59
9.	"New Art Riot"	2:59
10.	"Life Becoming a Landslide"	3:54
11.	"Revol"	2:36
12.	"4st 7lb"	4:53
13.	"This Is Yesterday"	2:59
14.	"4st 7lb" (Radio 4 Mastertapes; excerpt)	1:51
15.	"Faster" (Radio 4 Mastertapes)	3:39
16.	"P.C.P" (Radio 4 Mastertapes)	4:09
17.	"This Is Yesterday" (Radio 4 Mastertapes)	4:12

10th Anniversary Edition DVD

- "Faster" (performed on Top of the Pops)
- "Faster" (performed on Butt Naked)
- "P.C.P." (performed on Butt Naked)
- "She Is Suffering" (performed on Butt Naked)
- "4st 7lb" (performed on MTV Most Wanted)
- "She Is Suffering" (performed on MTV Most Wanted)
- "Faster" (performed at Glastonbury '94)
- "P.C.P." (performed at Glastonbury '94)
- "Yes" (performed at Glastonbury '94)
- "Revol" (performed at Reading '94)
- "Faster" (US video)
- "Judge Yr'self" (video)
- Yes (New Film Made by Patrick Jones)
- Band interview

== Personnel ==
Manic Street Preachers

- James Dean Bradfield – lead vocals, lead and rhythm guitar, production
- Richey Edwards (credited as Richey James) – rhythm guitar (credited but does not perform), sleeve design, production
- Sean Moore – drums, production
- Nicky Wire – bass guitar, production

Technical personnel

- Alex Silva – engineering
- Mark Freegard – mixing
- Tom Lord-Alge – mixing (US mix)
- Steve Brown – production ("She Is Suffering")
- Dave Eringa – keyboard ("She Is Suffering")
- Jenny Saville – front cover painting
- Barry Kamen – back cover painting
- Neil Cooper – sleeve photography
- Octave Mirbeau – author of back cover text (from The Torture Garden)

== Charts and certifications ==
=== Weekly charts ===
Chart (1994)	Peak position
Japanese Albums (Oricon)	48
Scottish Albums (Official Charts)	9
UK Albums (Official Charts)	6

=== Certifications ===
Region	Certification	Certified units/sales
United Kingdom (BPI)	Gold	100,000^{*}
^{*} Sales figures based on certification alone.
