= Greg Haver =

- Born: Gregory Haver
- Occupations: Producer, musician recording and mixing engineer
- Years active: 1980s-present

Greg Haver is a Welsh music producer, based in New Zealand. He is best known for his work with the Manic Street Preachers and Melanie C. He has worked on a number of award-winning singles and albums. With Manic Street Preachers, he was involved in production for numerous gold and platinum accredited albums. This Is My Truth Tell Me Yours, Send Away the Tigers and Know Your Enemy albums received gold accreditations in the UK. He also worked on Melanie C's album Beautiful Intentions.

Haver has also worked with a number of well-known New Zealand artists. He has produced songs for The Feelers, Opshop, Kimbra and Goodnight Nurse.

== Career ==
During Haver's early years as a musician, he worked with the Welsh band, Waterfront, in the late 1980s. He was the band's musical director and drummer, playing on their top 10 US single, Cry. In 1989, he was the drummer on Corey Hart's album, Young Man Running. After recording the album, he also toured with Hart in Canada, Japan and the Philippines. Haver's first notable engineering and writing work, came on the fifth Manic Street Preachers album, released in 1998. The album was titled, This Is My Truth Tell Me Yours. The album debuted at number 1 in the UK Album Chart, selling 136,000 copies, going Gold in the first week.

He teamed up with The Simpsons creator, Matt Groening in 1992 to create a second musical album for the animated series. The Yellow Album is a play on The Beatles' album of a similar name, which was finally released in 1998. Haver was credited for the writing and production of the track, "The Ten Commandments of Bart." Haver also was an engineer for Catatonia's album release in 1998. The Welsh band was hugely successful with the album, receiving a Mercury Award nomination. A year later, he was a session drummer on Tom Jones' Reload album. During this period, he also worked on two Super Furry Animals albums, Mwng and Out Spaced. With Huw Stephens from Radio 1, Haver founded the Cardiff-based record label Boobytrap Records in 2000.

Haver produced songs on the 2001 album by the Manic Street Preachers, which was titled Know Your Enemy. The album was the UK band's sixth release, with their last album coming three years prior in 1998. The album was a huge commercial success in the United Kingdom, reaching number two in March of that year. It remained in the charts for a period of sixteen weeks, selling over 100,000 copies in total throughout 2001. It received a gold certification from the British Phonographic Industry for the number of copies sold. Haver worked on a number of the album's tracks, including Freedom of Speech Won't Feed My Children and Royal Correspondent. He also produced a two-track EP for Bullet for My Valentine in 2002.

In 2002, Haver teamed up with Richard Parfitt, the ex-60 Ft. Dolls front man. The album was titled Highlights in Slow Motion and received positive reviews, albeit struggling to reach the top of the charts in terms of sales. A year later, Haver teamed up with the New Zealand rock band, The Feelers. The album was a big success, securing two number one singles in the country with the hits Larger Than Life and The Fear, from Playground Battle. Haver toured with the Manic Street Preachers in 2003 as a percussionist, following the release of their greatest hits album, Forever Delayed. During the same period, he also helped launch the career of Amy Wadge, now known as a regularly co-writer of Ed Sheeran's music. In 2002, Haver heard Wadge playing in Cardiff and recorded and released her debut album, The Famous Hour.

Haver again worked with on the Manic Street Preachers' seventh studio album in 2004. The album was titled Lifeblood and had two singles which narrowly missed out on becoming number one singles. The album itself peaked at number 13 in the UK Album Chart. Lifeblood was preceded by the single The Love of Richard Nixon. During the mid-week chart the single was in number 1 position, but dropped and charted in the second position on the UK singles chart. The album by the end of 2004 had gone Silver. The second and final single from the album was Empty Souls. It was released on 10 January 2005, reaching number 2 in the charts.

Later that year he worked on the production for 48May's album, The Mad Love. The album was well received in its native New Zealand, where it reached 19th in the official charts. The album continued to sell well after reaching its peak, securing a gold accreditation in New Zealand.

Beautiful Intentions was released in 2005 by the ex-Spice Girl, Melanie C. Haver was the main producer for the album. The album only had one single that charted in her native Britain, which was Next Best Superstar. Despite the limited success in the UK, the album performed well in mainland Europe, securing Melanie C a number of accolades. Beautiful Intentions reached number one on the Portuguese album chart. The last single from the album was First Day of My Life, which was only released in Germany, Austria and Switzerland. The single went platinum in Germany and gold in Switzerland.

In 2006, Haver teamed up with Manic Street Preacher frontman, James Dean Bradfield for his debut solo album. Two singles were released from the album, That's No Way to Tell a Lie and An English Gentleman. In the same year, he also produced the album of a second Manic Street Preacher member, Nick Wire. Wire's album received positive reviews, but didn't make any major impressions in the charts.

Haver co-produced the eighth studio album for the Manic Street Preachers, it was titled Send Away the Tigers. The album peaked at number 2 in the UK Album Chart following its release. The album received nationwide coverage in the UK, as it only missed out on the top spot in the charts by 690 copies, losing out to the Arctic Monkeys. Despite missing out on top spot, the album still received gold accreditations in both Britain and Ireland. The second single from the album, Your Love Alone Is Not Enough, reached number 2 on the UK Singles Chart. Three other singles were released from the album, all of which entered the UK Top 40. He also produced Second Hand Planet in 2007, the second album of New Zealand rock group, Opshop. It was released under Siren Records. The album was certified 3× Platinum in New Zealand on 8 February 2009.

In 2010, Haver returned to work with the New Zealand rock band, Opshop on their latest album. Until the End of Time reached number one in New Zealand. The album had a relatively low level of success when compared to their previous album. A year later he teamed up with Annabel Fay for her album, Show Me the Right Way. It was her best-selling album to date, peaking at 8th position in the New Zealand charts. Haver also worked with Chinaski in 2014 and 2017 on two albums by the Czech band.

Haver worked on Martin Carr's album, New Shapes of Life. He worked on the Snow Bound for The Chills, which was released on 14 September 2018. His recent releases also include the Red album for Devilskin, Horizon for Ekko Park, The Blessed Ghost for Voodoo Bloo and has become a member of the band Gramsci.

== Notable productions ==
- Manic Street Preachers - This Is My Truth Tell Me Yours (1998)
- The Simpsons - The Yellow Album (1998)
- Catatonia - International Velvet (1998)
- Tom Jones - Reload (1999)
- Manic Street Preachers - Know Your Enemy (2001)
- Richard Parfitt - Highlights in Slow Motion (2002)
- The Feelers - Playground Battle (2003)
- Manic Street Preachers - Lifeblood (2004)
- 48May - The Mad Love (2004)
- Melanie C - Beautiful Intentions (2005)
- James Dean Bradfield - The Great Western (2006)
- Nicky Wire - I Killed the Zeitgeist (2006)
- Opshop - Second Hand Planet (2007)
- Manic Street Preachers - Send Away the Tigers (2007)
- Opshop - Until the End of Time (2010)
- Annabel Fay - Show Me the Right Way (2011)
- Martin Carr - New Shapes of Life (2017)
- Devilskin - Red (2020)
- Voodoo Bloo - The Blessed Ghost (2022)
