= Indian Summer (Manic Street Preachers song) =

2007 single by Manic Street Preachers

Single by Manic Street Preachers

from the album Send Away the Tigers
- Released: 1 October 2007
- Genre: Alternative rock
- Length: 3:54
- Label: Columbia
- Songwriters: Nicky Wire, James Dean Bradfield and Sean Moore
- Producers: Dave Eringa, Greg Haver

Manic Street Preachers singles chronology
"Autumnsong" (2007)	"Indian Summer" (2007)	"The Ghosts of Christmas" (2007)

"Indian Summer" is a song by Manic Street Preachers and was the fourth single released from their eighth studio album Send Away the Tigers. It peaked on number 22 in the UK Singles Chart.

== Background ==
Nicky Wire mentioned around the time of Autumnsong's release, that "Indian Summer" was a strong candidate for the third single from the album, but was pushed back in favour of "Autumnsong".

On 1 August 2007 the official Manics' website reported that the band would soon be heading to studio in order to record b-sides for the single's release.

In an interview with Lauren Laverne on 6 August 2007 on BBC Radio 2, Wire said that James Dean Bradfield wasn't sure of "Indian Summer" as it sounded like "A Design for Life", to which Nicky said "well then, let's put it on the album".

== Release ==
It reached number 22 in the UK Singles Chart, breaking a run of 11 years where the band managed to chart all their singles in the Top 20 in the UK, starting with 1996's A Design for Life, and ending with Indian Summer.

== Music video ==
The video for the single shot on Super-8 film was directed by Patrick Jones.

== Track listing ==
=== CD single ===
1. "Indian Summer" - 3:54
2. "Anorexic Rodin" - 3:18

=== Maxi CD single ===
1. "Indian Summer" - 3:57
2. "Heyday of the Blood" - 2:44
3. "Foggy Eyes" (Beat Happening cover) - 2:53
4. "Lady Lazarus" - 4:09 (featuring lead vocals by Nicky Wire)

=== Limited edition 7" single ===
1. "Indian Summer" - 3:54
2. "You Know It's Going to Hurt" - 2:51 (instrumental)

=== Digital download ===
1. "Indian Summer" - 3:54
2. "Indian Summer" (Demo Version) - 3:49
3. "Indian Summer (Acoustic)" 3:58
4. "Indian Summer (Live At Vodafone Live Music Awards 2007)" 3:47

=== Promo CD ===
1. "Indian Summer" - 3:58
2. "Indian Summer" (Instrumental) - 3:56

When purchased as a bundle (CD Single, Maxi CD Single and Limited Edition 7" Single), the single included a set of four postcards featuring artwork by Valerie Phillips, with quotes on the reverse. One postcard per bundle was signed by the band.

== Charts ==
Chart (2007)	Peak position
UK Singles Chart	22
