= Highlights in Slow Motion =

Highlights in Slow Motion is an acoustic rock album by ex-60 Ft. Dolls front man Richard J. Parfitt. It was released in 2002 on Rough Trade Records. The sleeve was designed by Welsh-born musician and artist Jon Langford and embossed with a quote from the poet Roger McGough: "…and Cardiff's a tart with a heart of gold".

The album received favourable reviews in spite of an indifferent reception. "Reflective new direction for one time Britpop hellraiser…the wistful bedsit realism of "Wish I Was With You", and the loveless companionship explored in "I Took That Woman Home Last Night", point the way for a brave and newly impressive writer". The Daily Mirror wrote: "…his songs contain a dreamy charm and tearful romance. A few more sunbursting riffs (the excellent "What We Talk About") and we can call him a boss. "Parfitt’s thing is croaky, tousle headed soul (Chiltern [sic], Westerberg, Springsteen). The vocals are tremendously frayed and some of the steals are impressive. Whatever, this wooziness has a sure value’ Songs like the raw, nakedly emotionally "Downtown" or the superior Van Morrison-style conversational poetry of "Summergliding" display Parfitt's ability to mix adroit fingerpicking with purely pugilistic strumming."

== Track listing ==
1. "Downtown"
2. "Stone Honey"
3. "Summergliding"
4. "Highlights in Slow Motion"
5. "What We Talk About"
6. "Wish I Was With You"
7. "Let Love In"
8. "Morning Star"
9. "Freckles of Gold"
10. "I Took That Woman Home Last Night"

== Personnel ==
=== Performance ===
- Richard J. Parfitt – guitar, vocals, piano, harmonica
- Gary Alesbrook – trumpet
- Carl Bevan – drums
- Richard Glover – bass
- Osian Gwynedd – Fender Rhodes
- Greg Haver – drums
- Richard Jackson – bass, slide guitar
- Rachel Mari Kimber – cello
- Mat Sibley – saxophone
- Emily Travis – violin

=== Production ===
- Greg Haver
- Richard Jackson
