= Empty Souls =

2005 single by Manic Street Preachers

Single by Manic Street Preachers

from the album Lifeblood
- B-side: "All Alone Here"; "No Jubilees"; "Litany"
- Released: 10 January 2005
- Length: 4:09
- Label: Sony Music UK
- Songwriters: Nicky Wire, James Dean Bradfield and Sean Moore
- Producer: Greg Haver

Manic Street Preachers singles chronology
"The Love of Richard Nixon" (2004)	"Empty Souls" (2005)	"Underdogs" (2007)

"Empty Souls" is a song by Welsh alternative rock band Manic Street Preachers. It was released in January 2005 by record label Epic as the second and final single taken from their seventh studio album, Lifeblood. The song debuted and peaked at number two on the UK Singles Chart and reached number 18 in Ireland.

== Content ==
"Empty Souls" is said to be the political response from the band in relation to the September 11 attacks.

The single edit features a lyric that was changed from the album version. The chorus line on the album version runs "collapsing like the Twin Towers", but for the single it was changed to "collapsing like dying flowers". The backing vocals can still be heard to sing the original line, although this may have been kept in by mistake.

== Music video ==
The music video for the song sees the band separated throughout, only to meet up at the end after treks through various parts of Berlin, Germany.

== Release ==
"Empty Souls" was released on 10 January 2005 by record label Epic as the second and final single from the band's seventh studio album, Lifeblood. The single reached number two on the UK Singles Chart, missing out on becoming the 1,000th number one in UK chart history to the latest in a series of Elvis number-one single re-issues making the top of the charts at the time.

The DVD version of the single features two new songs which are both sung entirely by the band's bassist, Nicky Wire. The music for "Dying Breeds" is also entirely written by him, and the music for "Failure Bound" is the track "No Jubilees" played backwards. The video for "Dying Breeds" was directed by Wire's brother Patrick Jones, who made similar short videos for album tracks such as "1985".

== Track listings ==
UK CD1

1. "Empty Souls"
2. "All Alone Here"

UK CD2

1. "Empty Souls"
2. "No Jubilees"
3. "Litany"
4. "Empty Souls" (video)

UK DVD single

1. "Empty Souls" (video)
2. Dying Breeds (short film)
3. "Failure Bound"

== Charts ==
Chart (2005)	Peak position
Europe (Eurochart Hot 100)	4
Ireland (IRMA)	18
Scottish Singles Sales (Official Charts)	5
UK Singles (Official Charts)	2
