= Breathing Space =

Breathing Space may refer to:

- Breathing Space (organisation), a mental health counselling service
- "Breathing Space", a song by Opshop from You Are Here
- "Breathing Space", a song by Pet Shop Boys from Elysium
