= The Great Western =

Studio album by James Dean Bradfield
- Released: 24 July 2006
- Recorded: 2005
- Genres: Rock; power pop
- Length: 37:19
- Label: Columbia
- Producers: Dave Eringa, Guy Massey, Alex Silva, Greg Haver

James Dean Bradfield chronology
The Great Western (2006)	Even in Exile (2020)

Singles from The Great Western
- 1. "That's No Way to Tell a Lie" Released: 10 July 2006; 2. "An English Gentleman" Released: 25 September 2006

The Great Western is the debut solo studio album by the Manic Street Preachers vocalist-guitarist James Dean Bradfield, released on 24 July 2006 by Columbia Records.

== Content ==
The majority of the lyrics are written by Bradfield, who had previously only contributed lyrics to the Manic Street Preachers songs "Ocean Spray" and "Firefight". Bradfield's lyrics feature a theme of looking to the past and are largely personal rather than political. Manics bass guitarist-lyricist Nicky Wire contributes lyrics to the song "Bad Boys and Painkillers", and two songs feature lyrics co-written with writer John Niven. Also included is a cover of Jacques Brel's "To See a Friend in Tears". The album features the drummer Dafydd Ieuan from the fellow Welsh band Super Furry Animals on "Run Romeo Run".

The title refers to the Great Western Railway, which is reflected in the album's artwork. Much of the album was written on the train journey between Cardiff and Paddington. Bradfield uses the train journey as a metaphor for soul-searching while away from home. He refers to his journeys between his home in South Wales to London on the GWR in the song "Émigré".

== Track listing ==
All tracks are written by James Dean Bradfield, except as noted.

No.	Title	Lyrics	Music	Length
1.	"That's No Way to Tell a Lie"			3:05
2.	"An English Gentleman"			3:05
3.	"Bad Boys and Painkillers"	Nicky Wire		3:49
4.	"On Saturday Morning We Will Rule the World"			3:17
5.	"Run Romeo Run"			3:24
6.	"Still a Long Way to Go"	Bradfield, John Niven		3:50
7.	"Émigré"	Bradfield, Niven		3:29
8.	"To See a Friend in Tears"	Jacques Brel	Brel	3:38
9.	"Say Hello to the Pope"			3:24
10.	"The Wrong Beginning"			3:15
11.	"Which Way to Kyffin"			2:57

== Release ==
The album spent two weeks in the UK Album Chart, peaking at #22.

== Reception ==
Professional ratings
Review scores
Source	Rating
AllMusic	4/5 stars
BBC Music	generally favourable
Mojo	4/5 stars
MusicOMH	3/5 stars
NME	8/10
The Observer	4/5 stars
Q	3.5/5 stars
Uncut	4/5 stars

The Great Western was generally well received by critics.

Stephen Thomas Erlewine of AllMusic opined that the album is the sound of "a sensitive, vulnerable Bradfield, something that hasn't been captured on Manics albums even when they strayed toward colorless mature-pop." The website further described, "Sonically, this album isn't far removed from This Is My Truth Tell Me Yours—it's anthemic yet soft, dramatic yet hushed—but unlike on the Manics albums since, it doesn't sound labored." Q magazine echoed similar sentiments, opining that the album is "even stronger than either of the last two Manics albums [Know Your Enemy and Lifeblood]".

== Personnel ==
- James Dean Bradfield – lead and backing vocals, lead and rhythm guitar, bass guitar, drums
- Alex Silva – bass guitar
- Nick Nasmyth – keyboards
- Nick Dewey – drums
- Dafydd Ieuan – drums
- Alistair Hamer (Sweet Billy Pilgrim) – drums
- Greg Haver – drums, keyboards
- Dave Eringa – keyboards
- Padlock McKiernan – tin whistle, kazoo
