= Even in Exile =

Studio album by James Dean Bradfield
- Released: 14 August 2020
- Recorded: 2019
- Studio: Door to the River Studio
- Genre: Progressive rock
- Length: 48:20
- Label: MontyRay

James Dean Bradfield chronology
The Chamber: Official Motion Picture Soundtrack (2016)	Even in Exile (2020)

Singles from Even in Exile
- 1. "The Boy from the Plantation" Released: 1 July 2020

Even in Exile is the second solo studio album by the Manic Street Preachers vocalist and guitarist James Dean Bradfield. The album is a concept album based on the life and death of the Chilean activist, singer and poet Víctor Jara, with lyrics by poet and playwright Patrick Jones (the older brother of Manic Street Preachers bassist, Nicky Wire). It was released on 14 August 2020 by record label MontyRay, and reached number 6 on the UK Albums Chart.

== Release ==
In June 2020, two preview songs were released, "There'll Come a War" and "Seeking the Room with the Three Windows", followed up by the album's first single "The Boy from the Plantation" being premiered by Steve Lamacq on 1 July 2020 on BBC Radio 6. The album was released on 14 August 2020. Bradfield also released an accompanying three-part podcast "Inspired by Jara" discussing Jara's life and enduring cultural influence.

== Music ==
=== Influences ===
A concept album of the poet's life, Even in Exile drew inspiration from the folk music of Víctor Jara. In addition, James Dean Bradfield cited Man and their album The Welsh Connection, Pink Floyd and Meddle, German musician Nico and The Marble Index, as well as Johnny Marr and the band Rush as influences on Even in Exile. Discussing the record's influences with LouderSound, Bradfield stated that "I was actually able to pick up bits of stuff that I was influenced by but wasn't aiming for".

=== Style ===
Patrick Clarke of NME lauded Even in Exile "a personal prog-rock epic". Steve Crabtree opined that the record displayed a "musical range", including Latin music, progressive rock, and soft rock.

== Reception ==
Professional ratings
Review scores
Source	Rating
AllMusic	4/5 stars
DIY	3/5 stars
NME	4/5 stars
The Observer	4/5 stars

Even in Exile was generally well received by critics. Patrick Clarke of NME called it "a deft, heartfelt and above all personal record that pays fitting tribute to Jara's immense legacy, all the while providing a platform for some of Bradfield's finest songwriting in recent years". Stephen Thomas Erlewine from AllMusic praised "how it respectfully salutes Jara while conveying the emotions and ideas stirred within the singer/songwriter".

Nick Harris of DIY complimented parts of the album, but criticised its lack of focus. Damien Morris wrote in The Observer that: "Manic Street Preachers remain such an important band. Their frontman, James Dean Bradfield, that pocket pugilist with a valley chorister’s voice, has made an album–length tribute to Víctor Jara, the Chilean musician and activist murdered by Pinochet’s mob."

== Track listing ==
All lyrics are written by Patrick Jones; all music is composed by James Dean Bradfield, except as noted.

No.	Title	Music	Length
1.	"Recuerda"		3:54
2.	"The Boy from the Plantation"		3:53
3.	"There'll Come a War"		4:38
4.	"Seeking the Room with the Three Windows"	Bradfield, Richard Beak, Loz Williams	4:05
5.	"Thirty Thousand Milk Bottles"		4:34
6.	"Under the Mimosa Tree"	Bradfield, Gavin Fitzjohn	4:34
7.	"From the Hands of Violeta"		5:26
8.	"Without Knowing the End (Joan's Song)"		3:11
9.	"La Partida"	Jara	4:05
10.	"The Last Song"		5:16
11.	"Santiago Sunrise"		4:44
Total length:			48:20

== Charts ==
Chart performance for Even in Exile
Chart (2020)	Peak position
Irish Albums (Official Charts)	46
Scottish Albums (Official Charts)	3
Swiss Albums (Schweizer Hitparade)	35
UK Albums (Official Charts)	6
