= The Ghosts of Christmas =

Song by Manic Street Preachers

"The Ghost of Christmas"

Single by Manic Street Preachers
- Released: 1 December 2007
- Genre: Glam rock
- Length: 3:39

Manic Street Preachers singles chronology
"Indian Summer" (2007)	"The Ghost of Christmas" (2007)	"(It's Not War) Just the End of Love" (2010)

"The Ghost of Christmas" is a song by the Welsh rock band Manic Street Preachers. It was released during Christmas time as a gift to fans of the band.

== Background ==
Manics bassist Nicky Wire announced the release with the following message: "Here we go - a Manics Christmas tour is upon us. A fine and worthy tradition - To celebrate this season of goodwill we will be giving away our Christmas single 'The Ghosts of Christmas' on our website, and newsletter, from 1 December completely free. So to anyone who has bought our records, seen our gigs, read our reviews, joined our website or given us awards Thank You for a special year. The song is old school Christmas, the anti X Factor, for us it's actual fun. Hope you enjoy the song and the tour. Merry Christmas Nicky Wire, James and Sean. 'Nobody knows anything and nobody tells you anything' - Robert Capa"

Having been made available free, the single is non-chart eligible. No artwork accompanies the single, except for an animated picture on the band's official website of snow falling in front of an icy window on which is written "A Merry Christmas gift to all Manics fans everywhere. 'Ghosts of Christmas' free mp3. Enjoy! Nick, James & Sean. XX".

== Content ==
In allusion to the style of "The Ghosts of Christmas", Marc Burrows of Drowned in Sound proclaimed the song "sax-drenched glam rock Christmas song" and characteristic of "for the hell of it behavior of a band enjoying themselves".
