= Autumnsong =

2007 single by Manic Street Preachers

Single by Manic Street Preachers

from the album Send Away the Tigers
- Released: 23 July 2007
- Genre: Alternative rock, hard rock
- Length: 3:40
- Label: Columbia
- Songwriters: Nicky Wire, James Dean Bradfield and Sean Moore
- Producer: Dave Eringa

Manic Street Preachers singles chronology
"Your Love Alone Is Not Enough" (2007)	"Autumnsong" (2007)	"Indian Summer" (2007)

"Autumnsong" is a song by Manic Street Preachers and was the third single taken from the album Send Away the Tigers. It was released on 23 July 2007. It peaked and debuted at number #10 in the UK Singles Chart.

== Background ==
As with all Send Away the Tigers-related promotional material, the cover image is taken from the photography book Monika Monster Future First Woman On Mars by Valerie Philips.

The song "1404" recalls a 'lost chapter' in Welsh history, when Owain Glyndŵr was crowned Prince of Wales in that year having successfully revolted against the English. He was, however, the last native Welsh person to hold the title Prince of Wales.

James Dean Bradfield has mentioned in concert that the song's intro riff is, in part, a tribute to one of his guitar influences, Slash, and bears a passing resemblance to the iconic "Sweet Child O' Mine" riff.

== Release ==
The song peaked at number 10 in the UK Singles Chart, charting for 3 weeks in the top 75.

Two videos were filmed for the song. The version used for promotion on television, commissioned by the record label, features teenagers in various everyday group situations with lyrics from the song occasionally flashing on the screen. The alternative version, commissioned by the band themselves after being disappointed with the label's version and directed by Valerie Philips, is a single, one-camera shot of the girls featured on the Send Away the Tigers cover art miming to the song. The models are a Polish-American college student called Monika Monster and her cousin Kate.

== Track listing ==
=== CD single ===
1. "Autumnsong" - 3:40
2. "Red Sleeping Beauty" (McCarthy cover) - 3:14

=== Maxi CD single ===
1. "Autumnsong" - 3:40
2. "The Long Goodbye" - 2.46 (featuring lead vocals by Nicky Wire)
3. "Morning Comrades" - 3:12
4. "1404" - 2.27

=== Limited edition 7" single ===
1. "Autumnsong" - 3:40
2. "The Vorticists" - 3:18 (instrumental)

=== Digital download ===
1. "Autumnsong" - 3:40
2. "La Tristesse Durera (Scream to a Sigh)" - Live - 3:54
3. "Autumnsong" (Acoustic version) - 3:43
4. "Autumnsong" (Live) - 3:42
5. "Autumnsong" (Video) - 3:38

=== Promo CD ===
1. "Autumnsong" - 3:44
2. "Autumnsong" (Instrumental) - 3:42

== Charts ==
Chart (2007)	Peak position
UK Singles Chart	10

UK Top 40
Week	01
Position	10
