= Your Love Alone Is Not Enough =

2007 single by Manic Street Preachers

- Cover image taken from Monika Monster Future First Woman on Mars by Valerie Philips

Single by Manic Street Preachers featuring Nina Persson

from the album Send Away the Tigers
- Released: 23 April 2007
- Genre: Blues rock; pub rock; pop rock
- Length: 3:55
- Label: Columbia
- Songwriters: James Dean Bradfield; Nicky Wire; Sean Moore
- Producer: Dave Eringa

Manic Street Preachers singles chronology
"Underdogs" (2007)	"Your Love Alone Is Not Enough" (2007)	"Autumnsong" (2007)

Nina Persson singles chronology
"Black Winged Bird" (2006)	"Your Love Alone Is Not Enough" (2007)	"Vänner" (2007)

"Your Love Alone Is Not Enough" is a song by Welsh rock group Manic Street Preachers. It is a duet with Nina Persson, lead singer of Swedish band the Cardigans. Released on 23 April 2007 as the second single from the album Send Away the Tigers, it peaked at number two in the United Kingdom, number one in Scotland, and in the top 10 in Ireland and Norway.

== Background ==
The song is a duet featuring lead singer James Dean Bradfield and Nina Persson of the Cardigans, with additional vocals from bass guitarist Nicky Wire. According to the band they always had a duet in mind, because the lyric has a question/reply format. "Some people think Nina Persson's in the fucking band," Wire noted. "Which is great, because they've homed in on something that's uplifting and glorious. And by the end of the year, they'll be listening to 'Archives of Pain'."

According to Bradfield, the title was the last line of a suicide note left by a friend of someone close to the group. According to Wire, the song is in part concerned with the disappearance of Richey Edwards: "While I was writing those words addressed to him on Your Love Alone… something touched me at my desk when I wrote, 'I could have shown you how to cry.'"

As with all Send Away the Tigers-related material, the cover image is from the photography book Monika Monster Future First Woman on Mars by Valerie Phillips.

In allusion to the song's style, Dave de Sylvia proclaimed "Your Love Alone Is Not Enough" to be a "relatively straightforward call-and-response blues-rock number", while NME described the song as "a sugar-coated call-and-response pop gem with a cynical heart which hints at the shadow still cast over them by Richey Edwards' disappearance."

== Release ==
The digital release was on 23 April, and the song debuted at number 26 on the UK Singles Chart with 5,000 download sales. The following week, on 30 April, the single was released as a physical CD. On 5 May, Music Week reported that the single was due to top the chart; however, the following day, it rose to number two, behind the Beyoncé-Shakira collaboration "Beautiful Liar". In Scotland, the single debuted at number one, keeping "Beautiful Liar" off the top spot for a third week. The single spent a total of seven weeks in the UK top 40, which makes "Your Love Alone Is Not Enough" the longest-staying single by the group in the top 40 alongside "A Design for Life".

Outside the United Kingdom, "Your Love Alone Is Not Enough" reached the top 20 in Ireland, New Zealand, and Norway; in the latter two countries, this song was the band's highest-charting single. In Persson's native Sweden, the song peaked at number 48, becoming her only chart appearance away from the Cardigans. Elsewhere, the song reached number 66 in Switzerland, number 78 in the Netherlands, and number seven on Flanders' Ultratip chart. In Switzerland, it was their only charting single.

The single received a 12-inch vinyl release as part of Record Store Day 2017.

=== Awards ===
The song won "Best Track" at the Q Awards 2007.

== Track listings ==
CD single

1. "Your Love Alone Is Not Enough" – 3:57
2. "Boxes & Lists" – 3:56

Maxi CD single

1. "Your Love Alone Is Not Enough" – 3:57
2. "Love Letter to the Future" – 3:44
3. "Welcome to the Dead Zone" – 3:42
4. "Little Girl Lost" – 2:14

Limited edition 7-inch single

1. "Your Love Alone Is Not Enough" – 3:55
2. "Fearless Punk Ballad" – 3:59

Digital download

1. "Your Love Alone Is Not Enough" – 3:55
2. "Your Love Alone Is Not Enough" (James Solo Acoustic) – 3:59
3. "Your Love Alone Is Not Enough" (Nina Solo Acoustic) – 3:59

== Charts ==
=== Weekly charts ===
Chart (2007)	Peak position
Belgium (Ultratip Bubbling Under Flanders)	7
Europe (Eurochart Hot 100)	10
Ireland (IRMA)	7
Netherlands (Dutch Top 40 Tipparade)	10
Netherlands (Single Top 100)	78
New Zealand (Recorded Music NZ)	20
Norway (VG-lista)	5
Scottish Singles Sales (Official Charts)	1
Sweden (Sverigetopplistan)	48
Switzerland (Schweizer Hitparade)	66
UK Singles (Official Charts)	2

=== Year-end charts ===
Chart (2007)	Position
UK Singles (OCC)	94

== Certifications ==
Region	Certification	Certified units/sales
United Kingdom (BPI)	Silver	200,000^{‡}
^{‡} Sales+streaming figures based on certification alone.
