= The Truth (British band) =

1980s British rock band

- Origin: United Kingdom
- Genres: Rock, AOR, pop rock, new wave
- Years active: 1982–1989, 2012–present
- Labels: IRS Records
- Members: Dennis Greaves; Mick Lister; Tom Monks; Anthony Harty; Sonny Greaves
- Past members: Chris Skornia; Brian Bethell; Ben Willis; Steve Phypers; Russell McKenzie; Richard Parfitt; Gary Wallis; Allan Fielder; Dennis Smith; Billy Alford

The Truth are a British rock band, active from 1982 to 1989. They reformed in 2012 for occasional live performances.

== Biography ==
The group was formed by Dennis Greaves, formerly of Nine Below Zero, and Mick Lister in early 1982. They went through several line-up changes, but Greaves and Lister remained members throughout the group's run. They released several singles before their first album, Playground, was issued in 1985. The 1987 release Weapons of Love marked a stylistic change, and was their most commercially successful release in the United States. The title track was a hit single in the U.S., reaching No. 7 on the rock chart and No. 65 on the Billboard Hot 100. Several songs from the album were also used in the 1987 cult sci-fi film The Hidden. After 1989's Jump, they disbanded.

In 2012, Greaves reformed The Truth and played at London's Borderline on 26 October 2012. The line-up is the original 1983 line-up of Dennis Greaves, Mick Lister, Chris Skornia and Brian Bethell, with Steve Phypers.

== Members ==
=== Current line-up ===
- Dennis Greaves – guitar, vocals
- Mick Lister – guitar, vocals
- Tom Monks – keyboards, vocals
- Anthony Harty – bass, vocals
- Sonny Greaves – drums

=== Former members ===
- Chris Skornia – keyboards, vocals
- Russell McKenzie – bass
- Brian Bethell – bass (later Blow Monkeys member)
- Richard Parfitt – bass (later 60 Ft. Dolls and solo)
- Gary Wallis – drums
- Rowan Jackson – drums
- Allan Fielder – drums
- Dennis Smith – bass
- Steve Phypers – drums

== Discography ==
=== Albums ===
- Playground (Infinity Records, 1985)
- Weapons of Love (I.R.S. Records, 1987) – US No. 115
- Jump (I.R.S., 1989)

=== EP ===
- Five Live (I.R.S. Records, 1984) – UK #97

=== Singles ===
Year	Single	Peak chart positions			Album
Year	Single	UK Singles	Canada RPM 100	US Hot 100	Album
1983	"Confusion (Hits Us Every Time)"	22	—	—	Non-album singles
1983	"A Step in the Right Direction"	32	—	—	Non-album singles
1984	"No Stone Unturned"	66	—	—	Non-album singles
1984	"Playground"	—	—	—	Playground
1984	"Exception of Love"	92	69	—	Playground
1987	"Weapons of Love"	—	61	65	Weapons of Love
1987	"It's Hidden"	—	—	—	From film The Hidden, not included on album
1989	"God Gave Rock 'n Roll to You"	—	—	—	Jump
1989	"Throwing It All Away"	—	—	—	Jump

=== Compilation ===
- A Step in the Right Direction – Singles ● Demos ● BBC Live ● 1983-1984 (Cherry Red Records, 3 × CD, 2016)
