= Underdogs (song) =

Song by Manic Street Preachers

Single by Manic Street Preachers

from the album Send Away the Tigers
- Released: 19 March 2007
- Recorded: 2007
- Genre: Glam metal; punk metal
- Label: Columbia
- Songwriter(s): James Dean Bradfield, Nicky Wire, Sean Moore
- Producer(s): Dave Eringa

Manic Street Preachers singles chronology
"Empty Souls" (2005)	"Underdogs" (2007)	"Your Love Alone Is Not Enough" (2007)

"Underdogs" is a song by Welsh alternative rock band Manic Street Preachers. It was released in 2007 by record label Columbia as the first single taken from their eighth studio album, Send Away the Tigers.

== Fan competition ==
A fan competition was announced at the time of the song's announcement, asking fans to send in photos, videos and other visual media they thought fit the song and its theme. The final video, composed of clips from the band's previous videos and fan-sent material, was released on the band's website on 12 April 2007.

== Release ==
"Underdogs" was released on 19 March 2007 by record label Columbia as the first single taken from their eighth studio album, Send Away the Tigers. It was released on one-sided 7" vinyl – limited to 1,000 copies, and which sold out instantly on pre-order– and also as a digital download. A promo CD version in card sleeve also exists but is considered rare.

== Content ==
"Underdogs" was proclaimed by the NME to be a "glam-metal riot". Bassist Nicky Wire called "Underdogs" an "all out punk metal" song, and likened the track's outro style to that of Alice Cooper and The Stooges.

== Tracklisting ==
1. Underdogs

N.B. The only release of this single was on a 7" vinyl single
