= Send Away the Tigers =

2007 album by Manic Street Preachers

Studio album by Manic Street Preachers
- Released: 7 May 2007
- Recorded: 2007
- Studios: Grouse Lodge in County Westmeath, Ireland; Stir Studios in Cardiff, Wales; Strongroom in London, England
- Genres: Hard rock; glam rock
- Length: 38:12
- Label: Columbia
- Producers: Dave Eringa; Greg Haver; Loz Williams

Manic Street Preachers chronology
Lifeblood (2004)	Send Away the Tigers (2007)	Journal for Plague Lovers (2009)

Singles from Send Away the Tigers
- 1. "Underdogs" Released: 19 March 2007; 2. "Your Love Alone Is Not Enough" Released: 23 April 2007; 3. "Autumnsong" Released: 23 July 2007; 4. "Indian Summer" Released: 1 October 2007

Send Away the Tigers is the eighth studio album by Welsh alternative rock band Manic Street Preachers, released on 7 May 2007 by Columbia Records. It reached number two on the UK Albums Chart.

== Background ==
The album is named after a phrase the English comedian Tony Hancock used to refer to "battling one's inner demons by getting drunk". The album is widely seen as a return to the hard-edged, more guitar-driven sound of their earlier releases, being described as a hard rock album by AllMusic and Sputnikmusic, as well as glam rock by Uncut and Reno Gazette-Journal. The band itself has described it as a mixture of Generation Terrorists and Everything Must Go. The album was mixed by Chris Lord-Alge, whose brother Tom provided the US mix of The Holy Bible.

The album sleeve features a quotation from Wyndham Lewis (there misspelled as "Wyndam Lewis"): "When a man is young, he is usually a revolutionary of some kind. So here I am, speaking of my revolution". "I'm Just a Patsy" is a direct quotation from Lee Harvey Oswald denying the murder of U.S. President John F. Kennedy.

Nina Persson from the Cardigans shares vocals on "Your Love Alone Is Not Enough", the second single from the album. The song "Rendition" concerns the act of extraordinary rendition, which has been described as a global system of human rights violations. The song is partly inspired by the Academy Award-winning 1982 film Missing starring Jack Lemmon.

The photographs used as the album artwork are taken from the book Monika Monster Future First Woman on Mars by Valerie Phillips. The models are a Polish-American college student called Monika Monster and her cousin Kate.

In September 2008 the band embedded three songs on their website, named "Donkeys (Acoustic)", "Untitled Instrumental" and "Motown Junk (The Johnny Boy Anniversary Mix)". They were replaced by songs from their next album in April 2009.

== Release ==
The song "Underdogs" was made available as a free download and limited edition one sided 7" single on 19 March 2007 as a 'thank you' to the fans who have supported the Manics over the years. The song received its premiere on the Phill Jupitus show on BBC 6 Music on Saint David's Day (1 March 2007).

The album was released on 7 May 2007, and it entered and peaked the UK Album Chart at number 2 and spending 14 weeks in the UK Top 100, it sold 38,769 copies in the first week, the album was BPI certified as achieving Gold status (100,000 copies) during week 30 of 2007. In Ireland the album peaked at number 4, being certified Gold in that region as well. It reached the Top 10 in Finland and as for Europe, the album peaked at number 9 in the European charts.

The preceding single of the album "Your Love Alone Is Not Enough" featured Nina Persson from the Cardigans and debuted at No. 26 in the UK Singles Chart, reaching its peak on the second week, where it reached No. 2. "Autumnsong" was the second single and it managed to peak at No. 10, on the other end, the last single from the album, "Indian Summer", peaked at No. 22, making it the first Manics single not to chart in the Top 20 since 1994's "She Is Suffering".

The band released a special edition of the record on 12 May 2017. The special edition featured a remastered album as well as b-sides and rarities spread over two discs, plus a DVD which features the band's 2007 Glastonbury performance, rehearsal footage, an album track-by-track, and promo videos. This edition also replaced the second track, "Underdogs", with the former B-side "Welcome to the Dead Zone".

== Reception ==
Professional ratings
Aggregate scores
Source	Rating
Metacritic	69/100
Review scores
Source	Rating
AllMusic	4/5 stars
Digital Spy	4/5 stars
Dotmusic	7/10
The Guardian	3/5 stars
musicOMH	4.5/5 stars
NME	8/10
The Observer	3/5 stars
PopMatters	8/10
Q	4/5 stars
Sputnikmusic	4/5 stars

Considered a return to form for Manic Street Preachers, Send Away the Tigers was released to generally positive reviews from critics. At Metacritic, which assigns a normalized rating to reviews from mainstream critics, the album has received an average score of 69 out of 100, which indicates "generally favourable reviews," based on 13 reviews.

Q Magazine awarded the album four stars out of five, describing Send Away the Tigers as a "back-to-basics" rock record and calling it "overdue": "Send Away the Tigers refocuses the trio, allowing them to relocate their original plot and make a big rock classic." The publication cited the single "Autumnsong" as its highlight. NME gave the album eight out of ten, calling it the band's best release since 1996's Everything Must Go, and the "cathartic regeneration that the band really needed in order to become relevant again." Talia Kraines, writing for BBC Online, agreed and called Send Away the Tigers a "brilliant pop record."

Among less positive commentaries, The Guardian and The Observer both awarded the album three stars, with the latter describing Send Away the Tigers as a "pedestrian retread of former glories." Alex Denney went further in a negative review for Drowned in Sound, describing the album as a "bloated swansong" that was "embarrassing" in parts, with the band "going through the motions". AllMusic disagreed, with Stephen Thomas Erlewine describing its relatively short and concise length as a "welcome progression from a band that only a couple of albums back seemed stuck in a rut with no way out."

=== Accolades ===
Retrospectively, NME cited the record as when the band "rediscovered their sense of purpose and ushered in their third great phase" with the critically acclaimed Journal for Plague Lovers and Postcards from a Young Man following. Bassist Nicky Wire remains fond of the album, saying of the pre-Send Away the Tigers period: "It didn't feel like we were a band just before that. We were on the verge of nothingness and to dig that out of ourselves made us fall in love with music again."

"Your Love Alone Is Not Enough"
The single features Nina Persson and reached number 2 on the UK Charts.

The album helped earn the band the following accolades from critics:

- NME "Godlike Genius Award" in the 2008 Shockwaves NME Awards.
- The album was placed at No. 16 in Q Magazine's 50 Best Albums of 2007.
- Uncut made Send Away the Tigers the 43rd best album of 2007.

The record was also re-evaluated by Drowned in Sound in 2008, with Ben Patashnik describing Send Away the Tigers as "far better than anyone had any right to hope for, it sees the Manics embracing their stadium status by writing a collection of dynamic, catchy rock songs that seemed tailor-made for summer festivals. It blows the previous two albums out of the water, not simply because they sound like they’re having fun again, but because they’re not trying to ignore their past."

== Track listing ==
All lyrics are written by Nicky Wire; all music is composed by James Dean Bradfield and Sean Moore.

No.	Title	Length
1.	"Send Away the Tigers"	3:37
2.	"Underdogs"	2:49
3.	"Your Love Alone Is Not Enough" (feat. Nina Persson)	3:55
4.	"Indian Summer"	3:54
5.	"The Second Great Depression"	4:09
6.	"Rendition"	2:59
7.	"Autumnsong"	3:40
8.	"I'm Just a Patsy"	3:11
9.	"Imperial Bodybags"	3:30
10.	"Winterlovers" (includes bonus hidden track "Working Class Hero" by John Lennon)	6:43
Total length:		38:13

Japanese edition bonus tracks
No.	Title	Length
11.	"Working Class Hero" (written by John Lennon)	2:47
12.	"Love Letter to the Future"	3:45
13.	"Morning Comrades"	3:12
14.	"Send Away the Tigers" (acoustic version)	2:29
Total length:		50:26

Japanese 2009 re-release bonus CD
No.	Title	Length
1.	"Boxes and Lists"	3:57
2.	"Welcome to the Dead Zone"	3:43
3.	"Little Girl Lost"	2:15
4.	"Fearless Punk Ballad"	4:07
5.	"The Long Goodbye"	2:45
6.	"1404"	2:26
7.	"The Vorticists"	3:17
8.	"Anorexic Rodin"	3:09
9.	"Heyday of the Blood"	2:43
10.	"Lady Lazarus"	4:10
11.	"You Know It's Going to Hurt"	2:50
12.	"Red Sleeping Beauty" (McCarthy cover)	3:13
13.	"Foggy Eyes" (Beat Happening cover)	2:53
14.	"Umbrella" (Rihanna cover)	3:34
15.	"Umbrella" (acoustic)	3:27
16.	"Umbrella" (Grand Slam mix)	5:10
17.	"Your Love Alone Is Not Enough" (Nina & James acoustic)	4:00
18.	"A Design for Life" (live at the O2)	3:48
19.	"Everything Must Go" (live at the O2)	3:30
20.	"Motorcycle Emptiness" (live at the O2)	5:59
21.	"You Stole the Sun from My Heart" (live at the O2)	4:01

10th anniversary CD1 bonus tracks
No.	Title	Length
2.	"Welcome to the Dead Zone"	3:42
12.	"Send Away the Tigers" (demo, Faster Studios)	3:18
13.	"Underdogs" (demo, Faster Studios)	2:51
14.	"Your Love Alone Is Not Enough" (demo - 60's jangle, Faster Studios)	4:01
15.	"Indian Summer" (cassette home acoustic demo)	3:23
16.	"The Second Great Depression" (demo, Faster Studios)	4:38
17.	"Rendition" (cassette home acoustic demo)	2:06
18.	"Autumnsong" (demo, Faster Studios)	3:54
19.	"I'm Just a Patsy" (cassette home acoustic demo)	1:51
20.	"Imperial Bodybags" (demo, Faster Studios)	3:30
21.	"Winterlovers" (demo, Faster Studios)	3:09

10th anniversary CD2
No.	Title	Length
1.	"Leviathan"	2:40
2.	"Umbrella" (Rihanna cover)	3:39
3.	"Ghost of Christmas"	3:42
4.	"Boxes and Lists"	3:58
5.	"Love Letter to the Future"	3:51
6.	"Little Girl Lost"	2:17
7.	"Fearless Punk Ballad"	4:08
8.	"Your Love Alone Is Not Enough" (Nina solo acoustic)	4:00
9.	"Red Sleeping Beauty" (McCarthy cover)	3:18
10.	"The Long Goodbye"	2:46
11.	"Morning Comrades"	3:15
12.	"1404"	2:29
13.	"The Vorticists"	3:22
14.	"Autumnsong" (acoustic version)	3:43
15.	"Anorexic Rodin"	3:12
16.	"Heyday of the Blood"	2:44
17.	"Foggy Eyes" (Beat Happening cover)	2:54
18.	"Lady Lazarus"	4:11
19.	"You Know It's Going to Hurt"	2:49

10th anniversary edition DVD (Live at Glastonbury 2007 and extras)

- "You Love Us"
- "Motorcycle Emptiness"
- "You Stole the Sun from My Heart"
- "Faster"
- "Your Love Alone Is Not Enough"
- "Everything Must Go"
- "From Despair to Where"
- "Autumnsong"
- "Ocean Spray"
- "If You Tolerate This Your Children Will Be Next"
- "La Tristesse Durera (Scream to a Sigh)"
- "Imperial Bodybags"
- "Motown Junk"
- "A Design for Life"
- "Your Love Alone Is Not Enough" video
- Making of "Your Love Alone Is Not Enough"
- "Autumnsong" video
- "Autumnsong" alternative video
- "Indian Summer" video
- Track by Track
- Rehearsals, Cardiff, March 2007
- Practice Sessions

== Personnel ==
Manic Street Preachers

- James Dean Bradfield – lead vocals, lead and rhythm guitar, backing vocals
- Sean Moore – drums, percussion
- Nicky Wire – bass guitar, occasional vocals

Additional musicians

- Nina Persson – co-lead vocals on "Your Love Alone Is Not Enough"
- Sean Read – keyboards on "The Second Great Depression" and "Indian Summer"
- Sally Herbert – violin and string arrangement on "Autumnsong" and "Indian Summer"
- Andrew Waters – first violin and string arrangements on "The Second Great Depression"
- Sonia Slany – violin on "Autumnsong" and "Indian Summer"
- Lucy Morgan – viola on "Autumnsong" and "Indian Summer"
- Howard Scott – violin on "Autumnsong" and "Indian Summer"
- Morgan Goff – viola on "Autumnsong" and "Indian Summer"
- Ian Burdge – cello on "Autumnsong" and "Indian Summer"

Technical personnel

- Dave Eringa – production on tracks 1–4 and 7–10; additional production on tracks 5 and 6
- Greg Haver – production on tracks 5 and 6; additional production on tracks 4 and 9
- Guy Massey – engineering on tracks 1–3, 8 and 10; additional engineering on tracks 6 and 7
- Loz Williams – engineering on tracks 4–7, 9 and 11; production on track 11
- Chris Lord-Alge – mixing
- Valerie Phillips – photography (from her book Monika Monster, Future First Woman on Mars)
- Nicky Wire – artwork concept
- Steve Stacey – design

== Charts ==
Chart performance for Send Away the Tigers
Chart (2007)	Peak position
Austrian Albums (Ö3 Austria)	65
Belgian Albums (Ultratop Flanders)	57
Dutch Albums (Album Top 100)	35
Finnish Albums (Suomen virallinen lista)	10
German Albums (Offizielle Top 100)	50
Irish Albums (IRMA)	4
Italian Albums (FIMI)	78
New Zealand Albums (RMNZ)	33
Norwegian Albums (VG-lista)	38
Scottish Albums (Official Charts)	2
Spanish Albums (Promusicae)	69
Swedish Albums (Sverigetopplistan)	21
Swiss Albums (Schweizer Hitparade)	43
UK Albums (Official Charts)	2

== Certifications ==
Certifications for Send Away the Tigers
Region	Certification	Certified units/sales
Ireland (IRMA)	Gold	7,500^{^}
United Kingdom (BPI)	Gold	100,000^{^}
^{^} Shipments figures based on certification alone.
