= Patrick Jones (poet) =

British poet (born 1965)

- Born: 1965 (age 60–61) Tredegar, Monmouthshire, Wales
- Occupation: Poet, playwright, filmmaker
- Period: 1986–present

Website
- patrick-jones.info

Patrick Jones (born 1965) is a Welsh poet and playwright.

== Biography ==
Born in Tredegar in 1965, Patrick Jones was educated at Oakdale Comprehensive, Crosskeys College (a campus of Coleg Gwent), and then at the University of Wales, Swansea from 1983 to 1987. He was awarded Bsc. (Hons) in Sociology and American Studies. Jones has been employed in youth work, nursing aid, as a Literacy Officer and a Lecturer. He has lived much of his life in Blackwood but has also lived in Herne Bay, Swansea, in Germany, and spent four years in Chicago, Illinois.

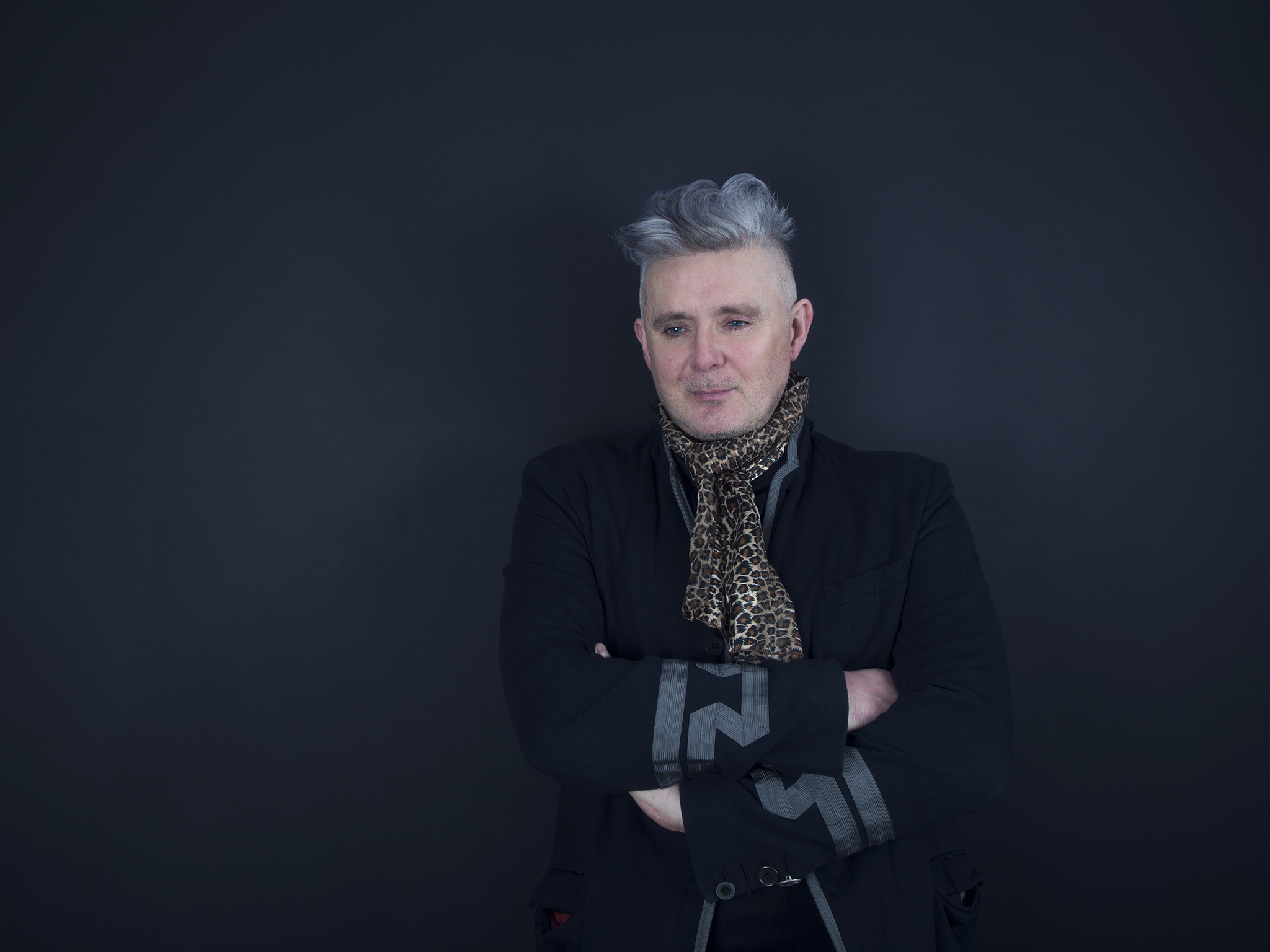

Jones set up the Blackwood Young Writers Group based at the Blackwood Miners Institute in 1993. He taught Adult Literacy at Blackwood Community College and the Ebbw Vale Institute. Jones is also active in setting up various reading and writing workshops throughout Wales from schools to youth centres. He has also served as the Creative Literacy Worker for the Cynon Project and in 1988 was writer in residence at Swansea College. He has worked in collaboration with Hafan Cymru, Ty Hapus, Literature Wales and The Welsh National Opera.

He participated in a week-long intensive writing masterclass with Arnold Wesker at Hay on Wye Literature Festival in 1997. Jones participated in the 1998 Dysfluency Tour. In April 1999, he staged a Kosovo benefit at Blackwood Miner's Institute involving Max Boyce, James Dean Bradfield and other artists. Later that year he read from and discussed sections of his play Everything Must Go at Marxism '99. 1999 also saw Ioan Gruffydd, Matthew Rhys and other Welsh celebrities performing his poem "The Guerrilla Tapestry" at the opening of the Welsh Assembly 'Voices of a Nation' concert. In 2004, he returned to the Hay Festival for a discussion with James Dean Bradfield on music, politics and writing.

Jones has worked with St David's Foundation Hospice Care, The Samaritans, Hope and Aid Direct and Learning through Growth in the Cynon Valley.. Has been involved in many protests including Save St David's Woods, and Justice for Fathers. In 2007 he performed a reading at a fundraising concert for Stop The War, during which he also collaborated with Newport band New State Radio.

Jones' play, Revelation, spoke out on behalf of victims of female domestic violence. Jones spent some time researching the play and it is based on over forty interviews with men who have experienced domestic violence.

It was supported by the Dyn Project Cardiff, Mankind UK, Chapter Arts Centre and the Welsh Arts Council. It was directed by Chris Durnall with Nathan Sussex and Stacey Daly and featured a soundtrack by Jones' friend and collaborator, James Dean Bradfield. It was performed at Chapter Arts Centre in July 2008 before transferring to a three-week run at the Courtyard Theatre in London as well as other, non-theatre venues.

In November 2008, Waterstone's cancelled an appearance from Jones at one of their stores, where he was expected to sign autographs and promote his new work, because of a planned protest by a religious pressure group over alleged blasphemy. In an effort to ensure that he was not gagged, Liberal Democrat Assembly Member Peter Black then asked Jones to read from his book, Darkness Is Where The Stars Are, at the Welsh Assembly, and the reading went ahead on 11 December despite protests.

A CD Tongues for a Stammering Time, with spoken word in collaboration with many musicians including Nicky Wire, James Dean Bradfield, Billy Bragg, Amy Wadge, Martyn Joseph and others, was released on Anhrefn Records in May 2009.

In 2014 The Forgotten, a Chartist musical co written with Drama lecturer Vanessa Dodd was performed at The Riverfront and other venues in the South Wales are to mark the 175th anniversary of The Chartist Rising. In March 2015 it was announced that Jones' play Before I leave would be part of the National Theatre of Wales' 5th Year programme. The play was inspired by The Cwm Taf Choir based in Merthyr Tydfil which is supported by The Alzheimer's Society.

Jones worked with Rhiannon White Co Artistic Director of Common Wealth Theatre Company Summer 2015 in and around Blackwood, researching and developing his first play Everything Must Go which was resurrected for the second Velvet Coalmine festival. 2016 saw the premiere of his new play Before I Leave produced by The National Theatre Wales. Based on research Jones undertook with various Dementia choirs and supported by The Alzheimer's Society Cymru, the play tells the story of a choir made up of members who live with dementia. It is currently being developed into a film.

Rough Trade Books published a new collection of poetry 'My Bright Shadow' in May 2019. Written during his mother's battle with Leukaemia and after her death the work deals with grief, loss, healing and the power of words to bear witness to a life.

A new album, Renegade Psalms was released in 2019. It is a collaboration with Jones and The Membranes singer and bassist John Robb, and featured eleven brand new tracks. A state of the nation address focusing on such issues as Brexit, austerity, the bedroom tax, housing inequality alongside hope, protest and love. In 2020 Jones developed the concept and wrote the lyrics for James Dean Bradfield's solo album Even in Exile composed of songs about the life and tragic death of Chilean activist and songwriter Victor Jara. It reached Number 6 in the UK charts. In 2021 Parthian Books published a 20th anniversary edition of Fuse(2001) with new poems, Fuse/Fracture.

Jones released a spoken word album in January 2025 "A Constellation of Sorrows" on Repeat Records. Reflecting on his time spent in Palestine with The Amos and Let Yourself Trusts in June 2023 and the ongoing Israeli war against the people of Gaza. In aid of Unicef Gaza Appeal. It featured Martyn Joseph, Jilliene Sellner and Wales based Palestinian oud player Salih Hassan.

== Works ==
=== Books ===
- The Guerrilla Tapestry (1995)
- The Protest of Discipline (1996)
- Detritus (1997)
- Mute Communion (1997)
- Fuse (Parthian Books) (2001)
- Against (2003)
- Last wRites (editor) (2006)
- Darkness is where the stars are (2008)
- 'The Aspirations of Poverty' Red Poets (2016)
- "My Bright Shadow" Rough Trade Books (2019)

'Fuse/Fracture' Parthian Books 2021

=== Music videos ===
All music videos are for Manic Street Preachers, using 'Crash Editing' facilities.

Year	Title	Album
2003	Judge Yr'self	Lipstick Traces (A Secret History of Manic Street Preachers)
2004	1985	Lifeblood
2004	A Song For Departure	Lifeblood
2004	Cardiff Afterlife	Lifeblood
2004	Emily	Lifeblood
2004	Fragments	Lifeblood
2004	Solitude Sometimes Is	Lifeblood
2004	Quarantine (In My Place Of) – Short Film	B-side to the single The Love of Richard Nixon
2004	Yes (New Film)	The Holy Bible (Tenth Anniversary Edition)
2005	Firefight	God Save The Manics EP
2006	Further Away	Everything Must Go (Tenth Anniversary Edition)
2006	Home Movie (footage, not music)	Everything Must Go (Tenth Anniversary Edition)
2007	Indian Summer	Send Away The Tigers
2008	Send Away The Tigers	Send Away The Tigers

=== Plays ===
- Everything Must Go (1999)
- Unprotected Sex (1999)
- The War Is Dead Long Live The War (2003)
- Bridges (2006)
- Sing To Me (2006)
- Revelation (2008)
- A Lament for Moths (2009)
- Before I Leave (2016)

=== Short films ===
- Pictures of the Gone World (1999)
- The Absence (2004)
- Nutters (2007)

=== Other publications ===
- Commemoration and Amnesia (Big Noise Productions) (1999) (Poetry performed by bands)
- Tongues for a Stammering Time (Anhrefn Records) (2009) (Poetry performed by bands)

- "Renegade Psalms" (Louder Than War ) in collaboration with John Robb
- Even in Exile (lyricist) James Dean Bradfield (MontyRay) 2020
- A Constellation of Sorrows (Repeat Records) 2025
