= Annabel Fay (album) =

Studio album by Annabel Fay
- Released: 21 August 2007
- Genres: Pop, Soul, R&B
- Length: 52:20
- Label: Siren Records
- Producer: Brady Blade

Annabel Fay chronology
Annabel Fay (2007)	Show Me the Right Way (2011)

Singles from Annabel Fay
- 1. "Lovin' You Baby" Released: 27 November 2006; 2. "Shake It Off" Released: 16 April 2007; 3. "Strong" Released: 18 August 2007

Annabel Fay is the debut studio album by New Zealand recording artist Annabel Fay. The album was released on August 21, 2007 through Siren Records. The album and earned her a Vodafone NZ Music Award nomination for Best Female Artist in 2008.

== Chart performance ==
Annabel Fay entered the New Zealand Top 40 Albums chart at #40 on August 27, 2007, and peaked at #30 on September 3, 2007. The album spent a total of 2 weeks on the chart.

Albums chart	Peak position
New Zealand Top 40 Albums	30

== Track listing ==
No.	Title	Writer(s)	Producer(s)	Length
1.	"Lovin' You Baby"	Annabel Fay, Linn Segolson, Brady Blade, Patrick Andren, Johan Carlberg, Joacim Backman, Jarmo	Brady Blade	4:50
2.	"I've Had"	Annabel Fay, Charles Anthony, Linn Segolson, Bob Durham, Brady Blade	Brady Blade	3:57
3.	"Shake It Off"	Annabel Fay, Boh Runga, Nicholas Manders, Joacim Backman, Johan Carlberg, Brady Blade	Brady Blade	4:22
4.	"Alone"	Annabel Fay, Linn Segolson, Charles Anthony, Brady Blade, Jaocim Backman, Johan Carlberg	Brady Blade	4:06
5.	"Tears Me Up"	Annabel Fay, Brady Blade	Brady Blade	2:26
6.	"Strong"	Jarmo	Brady Blade	3:31
7.	"What Would You Say"	Annabel Fay, Linn Segolson, Bob Durham, Brady Blade	Brady Blade	4:32
8.	"Keep On Moving On"	Annabel Fay, Linn Segolson, Johan Carlberg, Joacim Backman, Charles Anthony, Brady Blade	Brady Blade	3:30
9.	"Take My Hand"	Boh Runga, Annabel Fay, Linn Segolson, Brady Blade, Johan Carlberg, Joacim Backman	Brady Blade	4:10
10.	"Winners"	Sarah Bettens, Gert Bettens	Brady Blade	4:15
11.	"Home"	Linn Segolson, Joacim Backman, Johan Carlberg, Charles Anthony, Brady Blade	Brady Blade	4:15
12.	"Liar"	Patrick Andren, Zana Mesihovic	Brady Blade	4:19
13.	"Sleep Come Free Me"	James Taylor	Brady Blade	4:08
Total length:				52:20

Notes

- Track 13, "Sleep Come Free Me" is a bonus hidden track and a cover of the original 1979 version performed by James Taylor.
