= Second Hand Planet =

Studio album by Opshop
- Released: 19 April 2007; 17 November 2008 Souvenir Edition
- Genre: Pop rock
- Label: Siren Records
- Producer: Greg Haver

Opshop chronology
You Are Here (2004)	Second Hand Planet (2007)	Until the End of Time (2010)

Alternative cover
- Souvenir Edition cover

Professional ratings
Review scores
Source	Rating
Allmusic	3.5/5 stars

Second Hand Planet is the second album of New Zealand rock group Opshop, released in 2007 under Siren Records. A double disk 'Souvenir Edition' was released on 17 November 2008. The album was certified 3× Platinum in New Zealand on February 8, 2009, selling over 45,000 copies.

== Track listing ==
=== Original release ===
1. "Big Energy In Little Spaces"
2. "Helpless"
3. "Waiting Now"
4. "Smoke and Mirrors"
5. "Days To Come"
6. "Maybe"
7. "Cosmonaut’s Boot"
8. "Noah"
9. "One Thing Worth Preserving"
10. "Nothing To Hide"
11. "One Day"

=== Souvenir edition bonus disk ===
- Opshop Video History
1. "Big Energy"
2. "One Day"
3. "Waiting Now"
4. "Maybe"
5. "Oxygen"
6. "Levitate"
7. "Being"
8. "No Ordinary Thing"
9. "Saturated"
10. "Secrets"
11. "Nothing Can Wait"
- Bonus audio tracks from the Big Energy in a Can tour
- Special feature: Opshop at the MTV Snow Jam'08
- Photo Gallery

== Charts ==
Chart	Peak position
New Zealand Album Chart	1

== Certifications ==
Certifications for Second Hand Planet
Region	Certification	Certified units/sales
New Zealand (RMNZ)	4× Platinum	60,000^{‡}
^{‡} Sales+streaming figures based on certification alone.

== Awards ==
Award	Awarded at	Other Contenders in Category
Single of the Year ("One Day")	New Zealand Music Awards 08	Liam Finn ("Gather to the Chapel") Shihad ("One Will Hear The Other") The Phoenix Foundation ("Bright Grey") Tiki Taane ("Always On My Mind")
Highest Selling NZ Album	New Zealand Music Awards 08	n/a
Highest Selling NZ Single ("One Day")	New Zealand Music Awards 08	n/a
