= The Love of Richard Nixon =

2004 single by Manic Street Preachers

Single by Manic Street Preachers

from the album Lifeblood
- B-side: "Everyone Knows/Nobody Cares"; "Everything Will Be"; "Askew Road"
- Released: 18 October 2004
- Length: 3:38
- Label: Sony Music UK
- Songwriters: James Dean Bradfield; Nicky Wire; Sean Moore
- Producer: Greg Haver

Manic Street Preachers singles chronology
"There by the Grace of God" (2002)	"The Love of Richard Nixon" (2004)	"Empty Souls" (2005)

"The Love of Richard Nixon" is a song by Welsh alternative rock band Manic Street Preachers. It was released on 18 October 2004 by Sony Music UK as the first single from their seventh studio album, Lifeblood (2004), and reached number two on the UK Singles Chart.

== Content ==
The song is, according to the band, "a soundtrack to disillusion, hatred, love and never giving up". More specifically, the song is a sympathetic appraisal of former US president Richard Nixon and mentions some of his positive achievements, inevitably overshadowed by the Watergate Scandal. The timing of the single's release, two weeks before George W. Bush's victory at the 2004 US presidential elections, can also be seen as a statement by the band concerning the reputation of the USA's leadership at the time. In an interview with Repeat Fanzine, the band also said it represents how they feel in comparison to Radiohead. Nicky in particular commented that they feel like Richard Nixon compared to Radiohead's John F. Kennedy: "'If Radiohead are Kennedy, then Manic Street Preachers are Nixon: the ugly duckling who had to try 10 times harder than anyone else. Paranoid megalomaniacs.'"

The sound is more electronic than most of their previous hits, indicative of a slight switch in sound on Lifeblood; according to the band the song contains no guitars.

== Release and reception ==
"The Love of Richard Nixon" was released on 18 October 2004 by record label Sony Music UK as the first single from the band's seventh studio album, Lifebood. Unusually, the three formats of the single—two CDs and a DVD—could be bought together for £5 at most record stores, encouraging multiple purchases of the single. The song reached number two on the UK Singles Chart, number 15 on the Spanish Singles Chart, and number 17 on the Irish Singles Chart.

== Track listings ==
UK CD1

1. "The Love of Richard Nixon"
2. "Everyone Knows/Nobody Cares"

UK CD2

1. "The Love of Richard Nixon"
2. "Everything Will Be"
3. "Askew Road"
4. "The Love of Richard Nixon"

UK DVD single

1. "The Love of Richard Nixon"
2. Quarantine (In My Place Of) (short film)
3. "Voodoo Polaroids"

== Credits and personnel ==
Credits are adapted from the UK CD1 liner notes.

- James Dean Bradfield – writing
- Nicky Wire – writing
- Sean Moore – writing
- Nick Nasmyth – keyboards
- Jeremy Shaw – additional keyboards
- Greg Haver – percussion, production
- Tom Elmhirst – additional production, mixing
- Steve Davis – additional engineering, Pro Tools
- Farrow Design – artwork design and direction
- John Ross – portrait

== Charts ==
Chart (2004)	Peak position
Europe (Eurochart Hot 100)	9
Ireland (IRMA)	17
Scottish Singles Sales (Official Charts)	4
Spain (Promusicae)	15
UK Singles (Official Charts)	2
