= Show Me the Right Way =

Studio album by Annabel Fay
- Released: 11 April 2011
- Genre: Pop, Soul, R&B
- Length: 35:20
- Label: Siren Records, EMI
- Producer: Future Cut, Greg Haver

Annabel Fay chronology
Annabel Fay (2007)	Show Me the Right Way (2011)

Singles from Show Me the Right Way
- 1. "River" Released: 25 October 2010; 2. "Show Me the Right Way" Released: 28 March 2011; 3. "Already Home" Released: 18 August 2011

Show Me the Right Way is the second (and final) studio album by New Zealand recording artist Annabel Fay. The album was released on April 11, 2011 through Siren Records.

== Chart performance ==
Show Me the Right Way entered the New Zealand Top 40 Albums chart and peaked at #8 on April 18, 2011. The album spent a total of 5 weeks on the chart and is currently Fay's highest chart-placing album to date.

Albums chart	Peak position
New Zealand Top 40 Albums	8

== Track listing ==
No.	Title	Writer(s)	Producer(s)	Length
1.	"River"	Annabel Fay, D. Lewis, T. Babalola, J. McManus	Future Cut	3:33
2.	"When We Were in Love"	D. Lewis, T. Babalola, Ruth-Anne Cunningham	Future Cut, Greg Haver	3:24
3.	"Show Me the Right Way"	D. Lewis, T. Babalola, J. McManus	Future Cut	3:31
4.	"Already Home"	Shaznay, D. Lewis, T. Babalola	Future Cut	3:29
5.	"Not Enough"	Annabel Fay, D. Lewis, T. Babalola	Future Cut, Greg Haver	3:29
6.	"Love's a Bitch"	D. Lewis, T. Babalola, J. McManus, Makeba	Future Cut, Greg Haver	3:52
7.	"Who You Are"	Annabel Fay, B. Durham, S. Gooding	Future Cut	3:56
8.	"Steal Away"	D. Lewis, T. Babalola, P. "Taj" Jackson	Future Cut	3:17
9.	"Jessica"	Annabel Fay, B. Durham, S. Gooding	Future Cut	3:31
10.	"Spooky"	M. Shapiro, B. Buie, J.R. Cobb, Middlebrooks	Greg Haver	3:15
Total length:				35:20

Notes

- Track 8, "Steal Away" contains a sample of the recording "Steal Away Tonight" as performed by Barbara McNair.
- Track 10, "Spooky" is a cover of the 1967 version performed by Classics IV.
