= Lovin' You Baby =

2006 single by Annabel Fay

Single by Annabel Fay

from the album Annabel Fay
- Released: 27 November 2006
- Genre: Pop
- Length: 3:33
- Label: Siren
- Songwriters: Annabel Fay; Linn Segolson; Brady Blade; Patrick Andren; Johan Carlberg; Joacim Backman; Jarmo
- Producer: Brady Blade

Annabel Fay singles chronology
"Lovin' You Baby" (2006)	"Shake It Off" (2007)

"Lovin' You Baby" is the debut single of New Zealand singer Annabel Fay, released from her debut album, Annabel Fay. It was co-written by Annabel Fay and produced by Brady Blade. The single was officially released in New Zealand via Siren Records on 27 November 2006. It became a top-10 hit in her home country.

== Chart performance ==
"Lovin' You Baby" entered the New Zealand Top 40 Singles chart at number 40 on 11 December 2006. It peaked at number nine on 15 January 2007, where it stayed for a week. The song spent a total of eight weeks on the chart and is Fay's best chart placing as of 2026.

== Music video ==
The music video begins with Annabel Fay arriving at a theatre-like venue with a group of her friends. She is then seen in a black outfit on stage, singing and dancing with an entourage of male dancers and red umbrellas.

== Charts ==
Chart (2007)	Peak position
New Zealand (Recorded Music NZ)	9
