= The Yellow Album =

Studio album by The Simpsons
- Released: November 24, 1998
- Recorded: January 1992 – December 1994
- Genre: Hip hop; R&B; blues; gospel
- Length: 46:35
- Label: Geffen, Gracie
- Producer: Matt Groening; David X. Cohen; Anthony D'Amico; John Pickles; Greg Haver

The Simpsons chronology
Songs in the Key of Springfield (1997)	The Yellow Album (1998)	Go Simpsonic with The Simpsons (1999)

The Yellow Album is The Simpsons' franchise second studio album, released as a follow-up to the 1990 album The Simpsons Sing the Blues. Likewise with the previous album, "The Simpsons" characters sing (with their respective voice actors performing) covers and original songs. Unlike the previous musical album, reception and promotion was poor, and this would possibly be the final pop music album by "The Simpsons", as future music releases were soundtrack, comedy, or musical score albums.

Though it was released in 1998, the album remarkably consists of songs that were not included in Simpsons Sing the Blues, and/or, recorded figuratively around that time as well. Reason being due to conflict with the record label, and essentially several (up to twenty) featured artists such as Elton John, Mariah Carey, and Sting, (which none of the above artists would make the final album), who would later be removed from the album. However the album does feature Prince, Linda Ronstadt, and C+C Music Factory.

The album title is a play on the name of the Beatles' self-titled 1968 album, commonly known as "The White Album", with the skin color of the characters of The Simpsons. In addition, the cover is a parody of the Beatles' 1967 album Sgt. Pepper's Lonely Hearts Club Band.

The parody was also used for a couch gag in Season 8 Simpsons episodes "Bart After Dark" and "The Itchy & Scratchy & Poochie Show" (until it was replaced in reruns of the latter episode with the couch gag from "Kamp Krusty", where the Simpsons find the Flintstones on their couch and Fred invites Homer to sit with him). A similar version of it is on the inside of the United Kingdom version of The Simpsons Season 9 DVD. An outtake named "My Name Is Bart" is a parody of musician Prince's 1992 single "My Name Is Prince". In 1993, it was also reported that Matt Groening had penned a rap song to be performed by Bart.

James L. Brooks, producer of the show, wanted to produce a follow-up album based on the popular reception of the debut, but creator Matt Groening was against it. The cast then recorded The Yellow Album, but it was not released until 1998, at which time it suffered poor reception. Plans were in the works for music videos to accompany The Yellow Album.

== Production ==
Greg Haver cowrote and produced "Ten Commandments of Bart".

== Album artwork ==
The Yellow Album cover artwork, illustrated by Bill Morrison (although signed by Matt Groening as with all Simpsons promotional art), is a parody of the cover art for the Beatles album Sgt. Pepper's Lonely Hearts Club Band, replaced with characters from The Simpsons.

In 2005, the artist and designer Kaws (commissioned by Nigo) created The Kaws Album, a "traced interpretation" of The Yellow Album. In 2019, Sotheby's auction house in Hong Kong sold The Kaws Album for 115.9 million Hong Kong dollars, or about $14.7 million U.S. dollars, a new auction record for the artist at the time. Yellow Album artist Bill Morrison felt "ripped off" by this, re-igniting a conversation about the appropriation of commercial illustrations for fine art (see Roy Lichtenstein).

== Critical reception ==
Professional ratings
Review scores
Source	Rating
AllMusic	2/5 stars

There was some hype leading up to the release of the album. Entertainment Weekly writer David Browne said he "eagerly await[ed]" it in March 1993, a month before it was set to be released.

Nevertheless, the album received mixed to negative reviews. The Star-Telegram compared the album to the South Park album Chef Aid, arguing that "the subversion [included in The Simpsons and South Park] is only skin-deep, especially when both shows thrive on the type of money-grubbing merchandising that results in junk like Chef Aid: The South Park Album and The Simpsons The Yellow Album, both released just in time for Christmas." The Tampa Bay Times said the album "is an uninspired collection whose best feature is a too-tiny takeoff on the cover of Sgt. Pepper's Lonely Hearts Club Band," noting that songs such as "Ten Commandments of Bart" sounded dated, though others like "Sisters Are Doin' It for Themselves" are praiseworthy.

== Track listing ==
Track listing for The Yellow Album
Track number	Title	Performers	Length
1	"Love?"	Bart Simpson	3:50
2	"Sisters Are Doin' It for Themselves" (originally by Eurythmics)	Lisa Simpson, Ann Wilson & Nancy Wilson of Heart, Patty and Selma Bouvier	4:00
3	"Funny How Time Slips Away" (originally by Willie Nelson)	Homer Simpson and Linda Ronstadt	4:06
4	"Twenty-Four Hours a Day"	Apu	4:24
5	"Ten Commandments of Bart"	Bart Simpson	6:08
6	"I Just Can't Help Myself"	Bart Simpson, Lisa Simpson, Homer Simpson	4:58
7	"She's Comin' Out Swingin'"	Lisa Simpson and the P-Funk All-Stars	6:37
8	"Anyone Else"	Bart Simpson and Lisa Simpson	3:56
9	"Every Summer with You"	Marge Simpson and Homer Simpson	3:36
10	"Hail to Thee, Kamp Krusty"	Children's Choir, feat. Otto Mann, Lisa Simpson, Martin Prince, Bart Simpson	5:00
11	"My Name Is Bart"	Bart Simpson	4:56

"My Name Is Bart" is a bonus track only found on promotional copies of the album.

== Cast ==
- Dan Castellaneta - Homer Simpson, Krusty the Clown
- Julie Kavner - Marge Simpson, Patty and Selma Bouvier
- Nancy Cartwright - Bart Simpson
- Yeardley Smith - Lisa Simpson
- Hank Azaria - Apu Nahasapeemapetilon
- Harry Shearer - Otto Mann
- Russi Taylor - Martin Prince
