= Pins and Needles (song) =

Single by Opshop

from the album Until the End of Time
- Released: 9 April 2010
- Genre: Rock
- Length: 4:33
- Label: OPSHOP Music
- Songwriter(s): Jason Kerrison, Bobby Kennedy, Matt Treacy, Clint Harris

Opshop singles chronology
"Big Energy In Little Spaces" (2008)	"Pins and Needles" (2010)

"Pins and Needles" is a single by New Zealand rock band Opshop. It was released in April 2010, and charted on the New Zealand Singles Chart at number 20. The post-apocalyptic themed video was filmed using blue-screen technology.
