= Until the End of Time (Opshop album) =

Studio album by Opshop
- Released: 2 August 2010
- Genre: Rock
- Length: 51:35
- Label: Rhythmethod
- Producer: Greg Haver

Opshop chronology
Second Hand Planet (2007)	Until the End of Time (2010)

Singles from Until the End of Time
- 1. "Pins and Needles" Released: 9 April 2010; 2. "Madness & Other Allergies" Released: September 2010; 3. "Love Will Always Win" Released: January 2011

Until the End of Time is the third and final studio album by New Zealand rock band, Opshop.

== Background and release ==
Jason Kerrison, Opshop's lead singer, said of the title of Until the End of Time "it's more of a romantic notion than a cataclysmic one. Human society has found itself in a time where you've got an unprecedented number of cultures predicting an end time, and you know, is that a sheer fluke."

The album was released on the Rhythmethod label on 2 August 2010.

== Critical reception ==
Russell Baillie from The New Zealand Herald gave the album five-out-of-five stars, saying that "its sonic sheen and sincerity is just going to reinforce their status as the era's band of the people".

== Chart performance ==
Until the End of Time debuted on the New Zealand Albums Chart on 9 August 2010 at number one.

== Track listing ==
1. "Pins and Needles" – 4:33
2. "Love Will Always Win" – 4:00
3. "Through" – 5:26
4. "Paradox" – 3:33
5. "Madness & Other Allergies" – 3:55
6. "Monsters Under the Bed" – 4:25
7. "A Fine Mess We're In" – 4:35
8. "Sunday's Best Clothes" – 4:13
9. "Everything to Someone" – 4:09
10. "Nowhere Fast" – 4:08
11. "All for You" – 4:06
12. "Clarity" – 4:32
13. "Prophecy" - 3:04

Source: iTunes Store

== Personnel ==
- Clint Harris – bass guitar, vocals
- Bobby Kennedy – drums
- Jason Kerrison – vocals, guitars, keyboards
- Matt Treacy – guitars, vocals

Source: Marbecks
