= Wubble-U =

Wubble-U was an English dance music act of the mid-1990s, that was signed to BMG's independent record label, Indolent Records. Members were Laurant Webb, Justin Bailey, Dave Pine, Charlotte Fairman and Dave Coker, and became most famous for the single, "Petal". This was originally a 1994 release, that featured the comedian Stanley Unwin. A 1998 re-release took the track to number 55 in the UK Singles Chart. The band also remixed such artists as Madness, Gabriel, The Cardigans, the 60ft Dolls and Lisa Moorish.

Signed to BMG in 1997, the band's album, Where's Wubble-U, received critical acclaim.

The Czech film Whisper used their song "Petal".
