= Lifeblood (album) =

Studio album by Manic Street Preachers
- Released: 1 November 2004
- Recorded: August 2003 – August 2004
- Studios: Stir Studios in Cardiff, Wales; Grouse Lodge in County Westmeath, Ireland; Looking Glass Studios in New York, United States
- Genres: Pop rock; synthpop; alternative rock
- Length: 45:26
- Label: Sony
- Producers: Greg Haver; Tony Visconti; Tom Elmhirst

Manic Street Preachers chronology
| Lipstick Traces (2003) | Lifeblood (2004) | Send Away the Tigers (2007) |

Singles from Lifeblood
- 1. "The Love of Richard Nixon" Released: 18 October 2004; 2. "Empty Souls" Released: 10 January 2005

Lifeblood is the seventh studio album by Welsh alternative rock band Manic Street Preachers, released on 1 November 2004 by Sony Music UK. Two singles were released from the album: "The Love of Richard Nixon" and "Empty Souls".

While the album was met with generally positive reviews from critics, it is the band's least commercially successful album, peaking at number 13 in the UK Album Charts and has often been derided by the band members themselves, although they have expressed more positive opinions in recent years.

An expanded and remastered edition was released in 2024 to mark its 20th anniversary.

== Writing and recording ==
The working title of Lifeblood was Litany, hinting that the song "Litany", recorded during the Lifeblood sessions, was originally intended for inclusion. The track, however, ultimately only appeared as a B-side on the "Empty Souls" CD single.

Although the album includes songs about disgraced U.S. president Richard Nixon and British suffragette leader Emmeline Pankhurst ("Emily"), the band's earlier political lyrics are largely replaced by personal reflection, such as on their own past ("1985") and missing member Richey Edwards ("Cardiff Afterlife"). Lyricist Nicky Wire talked about the ghosts that haunted this record and stated that the record was a retrospective: "The main themes are death and solitude and ghosts. Being haunted by history and being haunted by your own past. Sleep is beautiful for me. I hate dreaming because it ruins ten hours of bliss. I had a lot of bad dreams when Richey first disappeared. Not ugly dreams, but nagging things. Until we wrote 'Design for Life', it was six months of misery. Lifeblood doesn't seek to exorcise Edwards' ghost, though, just admits that there are no answers".

Work on recording Lifeblood began in New York City with legendary producer Tony Visconti, but these sessions led to only three finished tracks: "Solitude Sometimes Is", "Emily" and "Cardiff Afterlife". The band then decided to continue with frequent collaborator Greg Haver and moved to Grouse Lodge Studio in County Westmeath, Ireland and then Stir Studios in Cardiff, Wales. Additional production and final mixing was completed by Tom Elmhirst.

The album is a departure musically, replacing the band's traditional guitar walls of sound with more subtle and melodic playing, with more emphasis being given to keyboards and synthesizers. This resulted in the album being described as pop rock, synthpop, and synthrock . Nicky Wire described the album as "elegiac pop" throughout the recording process. It is the band's first album not to feature profanity, although the single release for "Empty Souls" featured an edit to remove the mention of the Twin Towers.

Singer and guitarist James Dean Bradfield recalled the writing and recording process in 2015: "I felt like we were suffering from something called paralysis to analysis in the process of writing. Perhaps we'd run out of juice, and there was another version of the band that we needed to find [in] ourselves. So we had this MO before we went into the studio of not trusting our first idea or second idea, and we'd always chase the third idea. We'd write a song and discard our distinctive way of playing that song. Also we didn't really play together on that record — there wasn't much live playing. I would lay down a vocal and a guitar track, and Nick and Sean would come in and put down tracks separately. There is an element to that record where it feels slightly virtual and disconnected, and inorganic. It lacks our true instinct. It lacks the essence of what we are. I think we talked ourselves into a corner. It was an investigation that didn't work."

Nicky Wire reflected on the album in 2021: "Lifeblood is very much a withdrawal album. I was digging deeper holes, to just piss people off - without even trying. There's certain bits of it we do love. But as a man who grew up with the Guinness Book of Hit Records, the fact that the album went in at Number 13 just crushed me: 'Not even in the Top 10?! How has this happened?'"

== Release ==
Lifeblood was preceded by the single "The Love of Richard Nixon", released on 18 October 2004. During the mid-week chart the single was at the No. 1 position, but dropped and ended up peaking at No. 2 on the UK singles chart.

Lifeblood was released on 1 November 2004. It entered the UK Albums Chart at No. 13, selling 23,990 in the first week and spending only 4 weeks in the Top 100 in total (3 of them in the Top 75 including a re-entry at No. 27 in 2024). The album went Silver, but was the least commercially successful album by the band. By 2011 it had only sold around 90,000 copies in the UK.

"Empty Souls", the second and final single from the album, was released on 10 January 2005. Like the previous single, it debuted and peaked at No. 2.

== Reception ==
Professional ratings
Aggregate scores
| Source | Rating |
|---|---|
| Metacritic | 66/100 |
Review scores
| Source | Rating |
| AllMusic | 3/5 stars |
| BBC Music | favourable |
| Drowned in Sound | 9/10 |
| The Guardian | 3/5 stars |
| Mojo | 4/5 stars |
| NME | 6/10 |
| PopMatters | 7/10 |
| Q | 2/5 stars |
| Uncut | 3.5/5 stars |
| Yahoo! Music UK | 6/10 |

Lifeblood received generally positive reviews from critics, which had not happened for the band's previous effort Know Your Enemy. The album has a weighted average score of 66 out of 100 on Metacritic based on 9 reviews, indicating "generally favorable reviews".

AllMusic awarded the album three stars out of five and stated: "Lifeblood is a pleasant listen, but once you peel away the keyboards, sensitively strummed guitars and tasteful harmonies and concentrate on Bradfield's nakedly open voice and Wire's terminally collegiate lyrics, it's hard to escape the unintentional pathos that winds up defining the album and, conceivably, the band's latter-day career."

Barry Nicolson of NME wrote: "Where Know Your Enemy strived vainly for relevance, Lifeblood is seemingly content to exist as a highbrow rock record. Out go song titles that were half-baked political manifestos in themselves ('Freedom of Speech Won't Feed My Children' anyone?), in come elegiac pop anthems ('1985') and the welcome presence of Bowie producer Tony Visconti to add a glacial sheen to the whole affair. Indeed, this is arguably the best Manics album since Everything Must Go."

Colin Weston of Drowned in Sound praised the album, writing: "This is not rock, it is arguably not indie and would fit very comfortably next to the soft nu-wave eighties pop albums that your auntie has on the shelf... and it is quite simply brilliant! [...] 'Generation Terrorists' may well live forever in the hearts of their fans but 'Lifeblood' may well live forever as one of the best commercial albums of the band's career." John Garrett from PopMatters wrote "Richey may be long dead, but there's still warm blood coursing through the Manics' veins. They are for real—although maybe not in the way history had intended."

A negative review came from Q, calling the album "miserable and insipid".

== Legacy ==
In a reappraisal of the album following its 2024 re-issue, Clash argued that "‘Lifeblood’ was the starting point of the more varied textures that would follow in their music of the past two decades. Knowing when to ease off the bombast and how to present soulful, emotive ideas was a process most intently learnt in the writing of this record." Similarly, Louder Than War stated that the album "provided a blueprint for some of the Manics’ more sedate recent albums, including 2021’s The Ultra Vivid Lament" and that it "elicits melancholy in razor-sharp quality."

The band themselves have also begun speaking positively about the album and how they had previously been dismissive of it. Wire explained in 2024: "I think we’ve realised that it’s one of our best records. My problem was just that it was so unsuccessful."

In Under The Radar, Jimi Arundell noted the change in perception by the band's fans. "It may have had a frosty reception initially, but their cold, crystalline record now receives a warm welcome back."

== Track listing ==
All lyrics are written by Nicky Wire; all music is composed by James Dean Bradfield and Sean Moore, with additional lyrics by Patrick Jones on "Fragments".

| No. | Title | Length |
|---|---|---|
| 1. | "1985" | 4:08 |
| 2. | "The Love of Richard Nixon" | 3:38 |
| 3. | "Empty Souls" | 4:05 |
| 4. | "A Song for Departure" | 4:20 |
| 5. | "I Live to Fall Asleep" | 3:57 |
| 6. | "To Repel Ghosts" | 3:58 |
| 7. | "Emily" | 3:34 |
| 8. | "Glasnost" | 3:14 |
| 9. | "Always/Never" | 3:42 |
| 10. | "Solitude Sometimes Is" | 3:21 |
| 11. | "Fragments" | 4:02 |
| 12. | "Cardiff Afterlife" | 3:27 |
| Total length: | | 45:26 |

Japanese bonus tracks
| No. | Title | Length |
|---|---|---|
| 13. | "The Soulmates" | 3:44 |
| 14. | "Antarctic" | 3:04 |
| Total length: | | 52:18 |

=== 2024 Remastered Editions ===
On 12 April 2024 the album was reissued as Lifeblood 20 in single CD, 3CD digibook and 2LP formats to celebrate the 20th anniversary of its original release. It features two new remixes of "1985" by Porcupine Tree's Steven Wilson and the Cornish singer Gwenno.

Lifeblood 20 - Single CD edition
| No. | Title | Length |
|---|---|---|
| 1. | "1985" | 4:08 |
| 2. | "The Love of Richard Nixon" | 3:38 |
| 3. | "Empty Souls" | 4:05 |
| 4. | "A Song for Departure" | 4:20 |
| 5. | "I Live to Fall Asleep" | 3:57 |
| 6. | "To Repel Ghosts" | 3:58 |
| 7. | "Emily" | 3:34 |
| 8. | "Glasnost" | 3:14 |
| 9. | "Always/Never" | 3:42 |
| 10. | "Solitude Sometimes Is" | 3:21 |
| 11. | "Fragments" | 4:02 |
| 12. | "Cardiff Afterlife" | 3:27 |

Bonus tracks
| No. | Title | Length |
|---|---|---|
| 13. | "1985" (Steve Wilson's Extended Eighties Mix) | 8:26 |
| 14. | "1985" (Gwenno Mix) | 4:34 |
| Total length: | | 58:30 |

Lifeblood 20 - Digibook edition disc one: The Original Album
| No. | Title | Length |
|---|---|---|
| 1. | "1985" | 4:08 |
| 2. | "The Love of Richard Nixon" | 3:38 |
| 3. | "Empty Souls" | 4:05 |
| 4. | "A Song for Departure" | 4:20 |
| 5. | "I Live to Fall Asleep" | 3:57 |
| 6. | "To Repel Ghosts" | 3:58 |
| 7. | "Emily" | 3:34 |
| 8. | "Glasnost" | 3:14 |
| 9. | "Always/Never" | 3:42 |
| 10. | "Solitude Sometimes Is" | 3:21 |
| 11. | "Fragments" | 4:02 |
| 12. | "Cardiff Afterlife" | 3:27 |
| Total length: | | 45:26 |

Lifeblood 20 - Digibook edition disc two: B-Sides & Remixes
| No. | Title | Length |
|---|---|---|
| 1. | "Askew Road" |
| 2. | "Everything Will Be" |
| 3. | "Everyone Knows/Nobody Cares" |
| 4. | "Voodoo Polaroids" |
| 5. | "Quarantine (In My Place Of)" |
| 6. | "All Alone Here" |
| 7. | "Dying Breeds" |
| 8. | "Litany" |
| 9. | "Failure Bound" |
| 10. | "No Jubilees" |
| 11. | "Antarctic" |
| 12. | "The Soulmates" |
| 13. | "1985" (Steve Wilson's Extended Eighties Mix) |
| 14. | "1985" (Gwenno Mix) |

Lifeblood 20 - Digibook edition disc three: Demos, Outtakes & Live Versions
| No. | Title | Length |
|---|---|---|
| 1. | "1985" (Alternate Version) |
| 2. | "1985" (Demo) |
| 3. | "The Love Of Richard Nixon" (Drum Machine Demo) |
| 4. | "The Love Of Richard Nixon" (Live Rehearsal Demo) |
| 5. | "A Song For Departure" (Demo) |
| 6. | "I Live To Fall Asleep" (Cassette Demo) |
| 7. | "To Repel Ghosts" (Demo) |
| 8. | "Emily" (Demo) |
| 9. | "Solitude Sometimes Is" (Demo) |
| 10. | "Fragments" (Demo) |
| 11. | "Cardiff Afterlife" (Cassette Demo) |
| 12. | "Cardiff Afterlife" (Demo) |
| 13. | "Solitude Sometimes Is" (Tony Visconti Mix) |
| 14. | "Emily" (Tony Visconti Mix) |
| 15. | "Cardiff Afterlife" (Tony Visconti Mix) |
| 16. | "Empty Souls" (Live At BBC Maida Vale) |
| 17. | "The Love Of Richard Nixon" (Live At BBC Maida Vale) |
| 18. | "I Live To Fall Asleep" (Live At BBC Maida Vale) |
| 19. | "A Song For Departure" (Live At BBC Maida Vale) |
| 20. | "Fragments" (Live At BBC Maida Vale) |

== Personnel ==
Manic Street Preachers

- James Dean Bradfield – lead vocals, lead and rhythm guitar
- Sean Moore – drums, drum programming
- Nicky Wire – bass guitar

Additional musicians

- Nick Nasmyth – keyboards
- Jeremy Shaw – additional keyboards
- Greg Haver – percussion

Technical personnel

- Greg Haver – production on tracks 1–9 and 11
- Tony Visconti – production on tracks 7, 10 and 12
- Tom Elmhirst – additional production on tracks 1, 2, 7, 10 and 12, mixing on tracks 1, 2 and 4–12
- Mark "Spike" Stent – mixing of "Empty Souls"
- Mario J. McNulty – engineering assistance
- Stefano Sofia – engineering assistance
- Steve Davis – engineering assistance
- Loz Williams – engineering assistance on "Empty Souls"
- Farrow Design – design and direction
- John Ross – photography
- Metro Imaging – image manipulation

== Charts ==
Chart performance for Lifeblood
| Chart (2004) | Peak position |
|---|---|
| Belgian Albums (Ultratop Flanders) | 72 |
| Dutch Albums (Album Top 100) | 65 |
| Finnish Albums (Suomen virallinen lista) | 15 |
| German Albums (Offizielle Top 100) | 56 |
| Irish Albums (IRMA) | 15 |
| Scottish Albums (Official Charts) | 8 |
| Swiss Albums (Schweizer Hitparade) | 81 |
| UK Albums (Official Charts) | 13 |

== Certifications ==
Certifications for Lifeblood
| Region | Certification | Certified units/sales |
|---|---|---|
| United Kingdom (BPI) | Silver | 60,000^{*} |
^{*} Sales figures based on certification alone.
