= You Are Here (Opshop album) =

Studio album by Opshop
- Released: 3 May 2004
- Recorded: 2003
- Studio: York Street Studio in Auckland, New Zealand
- Genre: Pop rock
- Length: 47:43
- Label: Siren
- Producer: Brady Blade

Opshop chronology
You Are Here (2004)	Second Hand Planet (2007)

Professional ratings
Review scores
Source	Rating
Allmusic	3/5 stars

You Are Here is the debut album of New Zealand pop rock group, Opshop released on 3 May 2004 under Siren Records. On 12 May 2005, a special edition of the album was released. The album has since gone on to achieve platinum status in sales.

You Are Here peaked at #17 in the New Zealand album charts. "Saturated" reached #39, "No Ordinary Thing" peaked at #22

The album earned engineer Clint Murphy the runner up position for Best Engineer at the 2004 New Zealand Music Awards.

== Track listing ==
1. "Up Behind The Sun"
2. "Nothing Can Wait"
3. "Being"
4. "Saturated"
5. "Nexus"
6. "Thrown"
7. "Secrets"
8. "Low Tide"
9. "Breathing Space"
10. "No Ordinary Thing"
11. "Awaken"
- Special Edition

(released May 12, 2005)

1. "Up Behind The Sun"
2. "Nothing Can Wait"
3. "Being"
4. "Saturated"
5. "Nexus"
6. "Thrown"
7. "Secrets"
8. "Lowtide"
9. "No Ordinary Thing"
10. "Breathing Space"
11. "Awaken"
12. "Levitate"
13. "Oxygen"
14. "Lighter Than Air"
15. "Hey You"
