= Annabel Fay =

- Born: Annabel Charlotte Fay; 23 October 1987 (age 39)
- Origin: Auckland, New Zealand
- Genres: Pop, soul, R&B
- Occupations: Singer, songwriter
- Instrument: Vocals
- Years active: 2007–2013
- Labels: EMI, Siren Records
- Website: www.annabelfay.co.nz

Annabel Charlotte Fay (born 23 October 1987) is a pop recording artist from Auckland, New Zealand; and the daughter of merchant banker Sir Michael Fay. She first appeared on the New Zealand music scene in late 2006 as a nineteen-year-old with her debut single, "Lovin' You Baby". The single peaked at No. 9 and spent 8 weeks on the New Zealand Top 40 Singles Chart.

== Life and career ==
=== 1987–2006: Early Life ===
Annabel Charlotte Fay was born 23 October 1987 in Auckland, New Zealand. She was sent to school in Switzerland and then Virginia by her father, multimillionaire Sir Michael Fay, whose wealth is estimated at NZ$660 million. Having loved music from an early age, Fay planned to study vocal performance and audio engineering at Columbia College Chicago. All that changed when a music promoter heard her sing while performing at a Christmas party in New Zealand. He convinced her to record a demo of cover songs, which was then heard by Tracy Magan of Siren Records. After signing to Siren Records, Fay recorded her debut album in New Zealand and put her plans to attend college on indefinite hold.

=== 2007–08: Annabel Fay ===
Fay's debut single, "Lovin' You Baby", was released to the New Zealand market in late 2006. It peaked at No. 9 and spent 8 weeks on the New Zealand Top 40 Singles chart. Her second single, "Shake It Off", was released in August to coincide with the release of her third single, "Strong". Fay's self-titled debut album, Annabel Fay, was subsequently released through Siren Records on 21 August 2007. It was recorded with producer Brady Blade, formerly Emmylou Harris's drummer, who also produced Brooke Fraser's debut album. Annabel Fay debuted on the Official New Zealand Top 40 Albums Chart on 27 August 2007 and peaked at No. 30. The album signed to Siren Records and distributed through EMI Records and earned her a Vodafone NZ Music Award nomination for Best Female Artist in 2008.

=== 2011–present: Show Me the Right Way and inactivity ===
Her second album, Show Me the Right Way, was released by EMI on 11 April 2011. The album was not as successful as her debut, selling only 1,300 copies in the first month despite the lead single, "River", peaking at No. 10 on the New Zealand Top 40 Singles Chart. The album peaked on the Official New Zealand Top 40 Albums Chart at No. 8 and stayed on the chart for five weeks. The album and music videos were partly funded by New Zealand On Air, a fact that was criticised in the New Zealand press, given the fact that her father was quite wealthy. "Hold On" and "Warrior" were singles preceding Fay's third album Brave the Rain which was announced for 2012, and then early 2013, but was not ultimately released after their underperformance. In 2015, Fay announced she was studying for a psychology degree at Santa Monica College, California and keeping music in her life by joining the college choir.

== Discography ==
=== Albums ===
| Year | Title | Details | Peak chart positions |
| Year | Title | Details | NZ |
|---|---|---|---|
| 2007 | Annabel Fay | Released: 21 August 2007; Label: Siren Records | 30 |
| 2011 | Show Me the Right Way | Released: 11 April 2011; Label: Siren Records | 8 |
"—" denotes a recording that did not chart or was not released in that territory.

=== Singles ===
| Year | Title | Peak chart positions | Album |
| Year | Title | NZ | Album |
|---|---|---|---|
| 2006 | "Lovin You Baby" | 9 | Annabel Fay |
| 2007 | "Shake It Off" | — | Annabel Fay |
| 2007 | "Strong" | 18 | Annabel Fay |
| 2010 | "River" | 10 | Show Me the Right Way |
| 2011 | "Show Me the Right Way" | 16 | Show Me the Right Way |
| 2011 | "Already Home" | — | Show Me the Right Way |
| 2012 | "Hold On" | — | Non-album single |
| 2013 | "Warrior" | — | Non-album single |
"—" denotes a recording that did not chart or was not released in that territory.

== Personal life ==
After working on her third album and promoting the singles Hold On and Warrior in New Zealand, Fay moved from Sydney, Australia to Los Angeles in the fall of 2014, and commenced study at a chef training school.
