= That's No Way to Tell a Lie =

2006 single by James Dean Bradfield

Single by James Dean Bradfield

from the album The Great Western
- Released: 10 July 2006
- Length: 3:08
- Label: Columbia
- Songwriter(s): James Dean Bradfield
- Producer(s): Guy Massey

James Dean Bradfield singles chronology
"That's No Way to Tell a Lie" (2006)	"An English Gentleman" (2006)

"That's No Way to Tell a Lie" is the debut single of Manic Street Preachers vocalist and guitarist James Dean Bradfield, released on 10 July 2006 via Columbia Records. It is from his first solo album, The Great Western (2006). The song premiered on Janice Long's show on BBC Radio 2 in late April.

The song was added to Radio 2's C-List and BBC 6 Music's A-List on 17 June 2006. On 16 June 2006, it became part of Xfm London's upfront list. The song was also the background music to the BBC's Match of the Day's 'Goal of the Month' competition.

"That's No Way to Tell a Lie" spent three weeks on the UK Official Singles Chart, debuting at No. 18.

== Track listings ==
CD1

1. "That's No Way to Tell a Lie"
2. "Kodachrome Ghosts"
3. "I Never Wanted Sunshine"
4. "That's No Way to Tell a Lie" (Video)

CD2

1. "That's No Way to Tell a Lie"
2. "Don't Look Back"

7-inch

1. "That's No Way to Tell a Lie"
2. "Lost Again"
