= Breathing Space (organisation) =

Counselling service in Scotland

Breathing Space is a psychological counselling service in Scotland for people feeling depressed, or with other urgent psychological problems. It has a telephone helpline, a web interface, and a British Sign Language webcam interface, all staffed by trained advisers who offer guidance and referral. The service is funded by the Scottish Government Health Directorate and NHS 24, and is operationally managed by NHS 24.

The group is a Counselling and Psychotherapy in Scotland Recognised Counselling Skills Organisation, and works with partners including Choose Life, Scotland's national suicide-prevention program.

== See also ==
- Mental health in the United Kingdom
