= Opshop =

New Zealand rock band

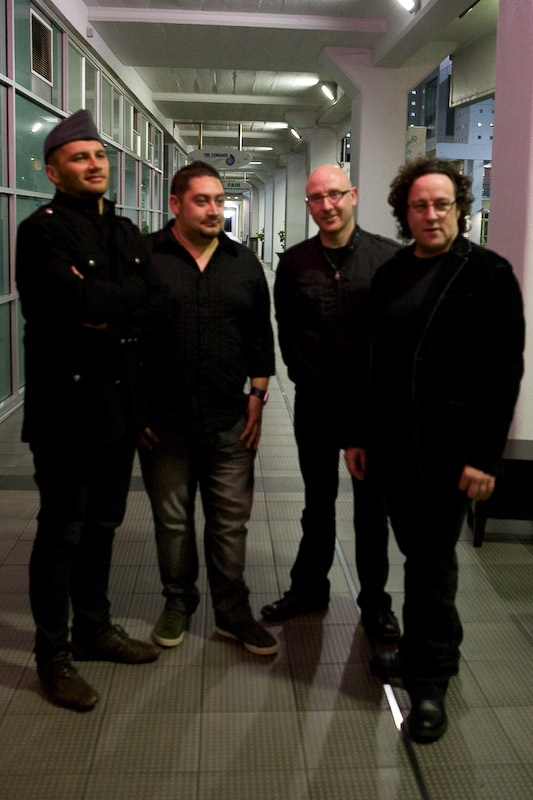
- Opshop at the TechFest, Auckland in 2008

Background information
- Origin: Auckland, New Zealand
- Genre: Alternative rock
- Years active: 2002–2013 (hiatus); 2018
- Label: Siren Records
- Past members: Jason Kerrison; Matt Treacy

Opshop are a New Zealand rock band who formed in 2002. They released their first album, You Are Here in 2004, their second album Second Hand Planet in 2007, and their third album Until The End of Time, which debuted at number one on the New Zealand Album Charts, in 2010.

== About ==
In 2008, the band won the 2008 APRA Silver Scroll for Song of the Year for their song "One Day".

Jason Kerrison, the lead member of the group, appeared on The Masked Singer NZ as a tuatara, winning the first season.

In 2011, Kerrison built a bunker after watching the 2009 film 2012. He said that John Cusack's performance was convincing, causing him to think the end of the world was near.

== Discography ==
=== Albums ===
| Year | Title | Details | Peak chart positions | Certifications |
| Year | Title | Details | NZ | Certifications |
|---|---|---|---|---|
| 2004 | You Are Here | Released: May 2004; Special Edition released: 17 May 2005; Label: Siren Records; Catalogue: 5775732 | 17 | platinum (NZ) |
| 2007 | Second Hand Planet | Released: 16 April 2007; Label: Siren Records; Catalogue: 17476644 | 1 | 3× platinum (NZ) |
| 2010 | Until the End of Time | Released: 31 August 2010; Label: OpshopMusic/Rhythmethod; Catalogue: OP250210002 | 1 | |
"—" denotes a recording that did not chart or was not released in that territory.

=== Singles ===
| Year | Title | Peak chart positions | Certifications | Album |
| Year | Title | NZ | Certifications | Album |
|---|---|---|---|---|
| 2003 | "Nothing Can Wait" | — | | You Are Here |
| 2003 | "Secrets" | — | | You Are Here |
| 2004 | "Saturated" | 39 | | You Are Here |
| 2004 | "No Ordinary Thing" | 22 | | You Are Here |
| 2004 | "Levitate" | — | | You Are Here |
| 2005 | "Being" | — | | You Are Here |
| 2006 | "Oxygen" | — | | You Are Here - Special Edition |
| 2007 | "Maybe" | 3 | | Second Hand Planet |
| 2007 | "Waiting Now" | — | | Second Hand Planet |
| 2007 | "One Day" | 4 | | Second Hand Planet |
| 2008 | "Big Energy in Little Spaces" | — | | Second Hand Planet |
| 2010 | "Pins and Needles" | 20 | | Until the End of Time |
| 2010 | "Madness and Other Allergies" | 29 | | Until the End of Time |
| 2011 | "Love Will Always Win" | 11 | | Until the End of Time |
| 2012 | "Never Leave Me Again" | 21 | | Non-album single |
