= The Chamber (2016 film) =

2016 film by Ben Parker

- Official film poster
- The Chamber
- Directed by: Ben Parker
- Written by: Ben Parker
- Produced by: Jen Handorf; Paul Higgins
- Starring: Johannes Bah Kuhnke; Charlotte Salt; James McArdle; Elliot Levey
- Cinematography: Benjamin Pritchard
- Edited by: Will Gilbey
- Music by: James Dean Bradfield
- Production companies: Chamber Films; Edicis; Ffilm Cymru Wales
- Distributed by: StudioCanal (United Kingdom); Cinedigm (United States)
- Release dates: August 26, 2016 (FrightFest); February 23, 2018
- Running time: 87 minutes
- Countries: United Kingdom; United States
- Language: English

The Chamber is a 2016 survival film about four people trapped in a submersible at the bottom of the ocean. The film is directed by Ben Parker in his directorial debut, and it stars Johannes Bah Kuhnke, Charlotte Salt, James McArdle, and Elliot Levey.

== Cast ==
- Johannes Bah Kuhnke as Mats
- Charlotte Salt as Red
- James McArdle as Parks
- Elliot Levey as Denholm
- Christian Hillborg as Andy
- David Horovitch as the captain

== Drone ==
Director Ben Parker said of the drone's inclusion, "A drone that crashed in the ocean was where the kernel of the story came from. I’ve always been fascinated, or rather terrified, by drones... The disconnect of using unmanned aircraft for attacks is something that scares me. And The Chamber was really about all my darkest fears rolled into one, so I wanted the plot to revolve around the recovery of one of these drones."

== Critical reception ==
Review aggregator website Rotten Tomatoes reported an approval rating of 33% based on 15 reviews. Metacritic gave the film a weighted average score of 40 out of 100, based on 5 critics, indicating "mixed or average reviews".

== See also ==
- Submarine films
- List of films featuring drones
