= Hope and Aid Direct =

Humanitarian aid charity

- Established: 24 August 1999
- Registration no.: 1077146
- Legal status: Registered charity
- Purpose: Humanitarian aid
- Location: Essex CM4 9EE, United Kingdom
- Head of Operations: Charles Storer MBE
- Revenue: £112,056 (2024)
- Staff: 0 (2025)
- Volunteers: 50 (2025)
- Website: www.hopeandaiddirect.org
- Formerly called: Convoy of Hope and Aid Direct

Hope and Aid Direct is a volunteer-led, UK based humanitarian aid non-governmental organization (NGO) founded in 1999 in response to the conflict between to Croatia, Bosnia and Serbia. Their motto is "Taking Hope and Aid not Sides". It operates across mainland Europe and beyond, where it can provide direct tangible support to those in need.

1999 – 2020: Hope and Aid Direct's modus operandi was that volunteers raised their own funds, collected and packed aid into hired lorries and drove these out twice a year in convoys across Europe, In partnership with NGOs volunteers handed aid directly to people who needed it most. Hope and Aid Direct volunteers were also involved in projects such as rebuilding and renovating schools and orphanages, installing sanitation systems into collective centers, setting up income generation projects and delivering aid for third parties who would not be as welcome in some areas. Countries of operation included: Croatia, Bosnia, Kosova, Montenegro, Serbia (1999–2015).

The 2015 European migrant crisis took Hope and Aid Direct volunteers direction of travel and aid distribution to mainland Greece, the Greek Islands and Serbia where urgent support was needed to support the movement of refugees and migrants into Europe, mainly from the Middle East. It also started its support to grassroots organizations in France to provide tents and sleeping bags (this support continues with annual collections and deliveries to Calais and Dunkirk).

2020:During the COVID-19 pandemic, Hope and Aid Direct volunteers used its resources (lorries and personnel) to transport PPE equipment to frontline NHS staff working in hospitals across the UK.

2021 –2023: Overseas operations continued in France, as Hope and Aid Direct responded to the Russo-Ukrainian war . Hope and Aid Direct altered its operational model in order to deal with the sheer volume of aid being required and being offered and acquired free storage facilities in Essex where aid was sorted by local volunteers. Onward transportation was to Poland, Romania, Slovakia and Moldova, neighboring countries around Ukraine where Ukrainians had fled, and for onward transportation into Ukraine by partner NGOs.

2022 – date: Hope and Aid Direct's main focus continues to be Ukraine and uses a backloading cost-effective model to regularly transport essential aid directly into Ukraine (backloading is where a logistics provider, uses the available, otherwise empty space on a Ukrainian truck that has come to the UK, to transport goods during a return journey. This reduces fuel costs and environmental impact while offering lower rates to customers, e.g. in this case, Hope and Aid Direct).

On average the charity has sent and continues to send at least one 40-foot articulated lorry per month to Kyiv for onward distribution by local partners directly into the hands of those in need – community members and service providers - to allow access to essential services and supplies. As of January 2026, 95 shipments of essential aid have been made directly to Ukraine.

Aid continues to be collected by volunteers across the UK and transported to a central Essex store, where a team of core volunteers sort, pack and load humanitarian aid onto the lorries for transportation to Ukraine.

In addition, the charity continues to support refugees and migrants in France with the annual collection of tents and sleeping bags that are salvaged from festivals in the UK and transported to France. In 2025, it also responded to the Gaza war to provide funds for much needed food through trusted NGOs working in the Gaza strip.

In 2025 Hope and Aid Direct launched a new initiative ‘Donate to Divert’ to redirect surplus goods, considered as waste by corporate companies, away from landfill and incineration and into the hands of those who need it the most.

Volunteers consist of a diverse group of people from across the UK. Over the years volunteers have also been involved in responding to other crisis, where for example, in 2004, three volunteers joined an international charity response in Sri Lanka in the aftermath of the Indian Ocean earthquake and tsunami; in 2012 and 2013, Hope and Aid Direct responded to man-made and natural disasters in Syria and the Philippines (Typhoon Haiyan) where goods were sourced in the UK and shipped out to partners to provide essential support to those affected.
