= An English Gentleman =

Single by James Dean Bradfield

from the album The Great Western
- Released: 25 September 2006
- Recorded: 2005
- Genre: Rock
- Length: 3:05
- Label: Columbia
- Songwriter(s): James Dean Bradfield
- Producer(s): Guy Massey

James Dean Bradfield singles chronology
"That's No Way To Tell A Lie" (2006)	"An English Gentleman" (2006)

"An English Gentleman" is the second single from the album The Great Western by Welsh singer-songwriter James Dean Bradfield, released on 25 September 2006 on Columbia Records." The title track pays tribute to the late Manics publicist Philip Hall. Also featured on the CD version of the single is a cover Frank Sinatra's "Summer Wind", Bradfield's favourite song.

The initial pressings of the red 7" single were actually made with black vinyl, some of which were sent out to distributors by mistake."

== Single track listings ==
- All songs written by James Dean Bradfield except when noted otherwise.

=== CD ===
1. "An English Gentleman"
2. "Days Slip Away" (Lyrics by John Niven)
3. "Summer Wind" (Henry Mayer/Johnny Mercer)
4. "An English Gentleman" (Video)

=== 7" (1) ===
1. "An English Gentleman"
2. "Victory and Defeat on the Kendon Hill"

=== 7" (2) ===
1. "An English Gentleman"
2. "Silver Birch Bonfire Blues"
