= Richard Parfitt =

Welsh musician

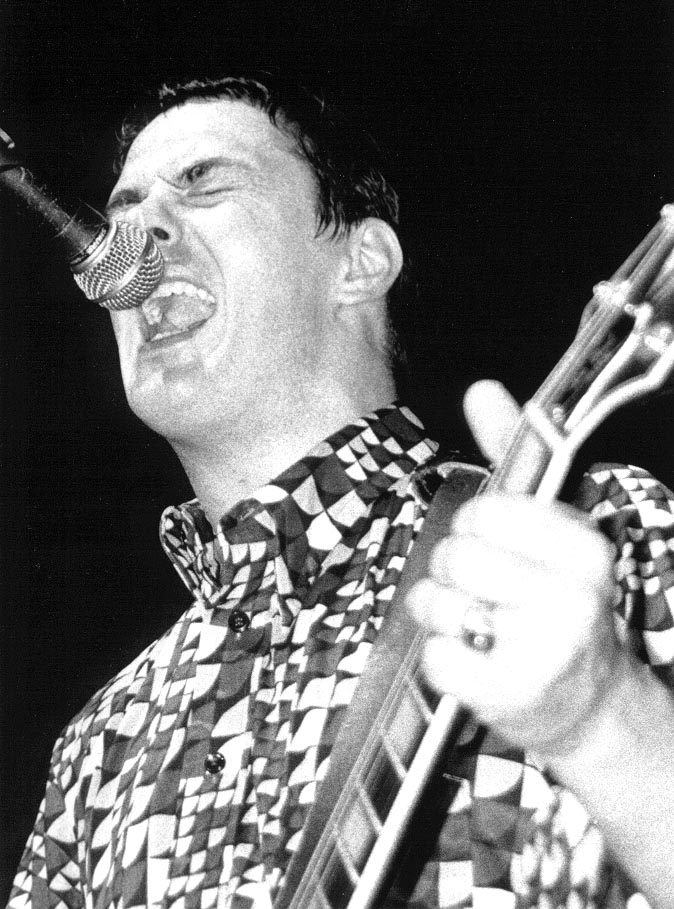
Richard Parfitt, Southampton Guildhall, 1996

Richard John Parfitt is a Welsh writer and musician from Newport, Wales. Born in Cwmbran, Parfitt spent two years as a teenager living in Toronto before returning home in 1980. Most publicly notable for his role as a founding member of 1990s rock band The 60ft. Dolls. He had previously played in local mod band The Colours, who were renowned for busking on the streets of Newport. The Colours only released the one single, "The Dance", on the Loco label before he left to join The Truth in 1984, playing bass on their Five Live EP which was recorded at the 100 Club, as well as their 1985 album, Playground.

After having several UK Top 40 hits during the 1990s, along with moderate success in the US, the 60 ft. Dolls split and Parfitt began working as a professional songwriter and session musician, going on to be credited by Welsh singer Duffy of discovering her talents and 'changing her life'. Parfitt helped write several songs for the artist's deluxe edition of the album Rockferry - which had considerable commercial success around the world, reaching UK No. 1 and becoming one of the ten best-selling albums in the world in 2008 – including the song from the film How To Lose Friends and Alienate People, "Enough Love".

Parfitt also worked as a session guitarist on British artist Dido's second studio album, Life for Rent.

In 2019, Parfitt was shortlisted for the New Welsh Review Rheidol Prize in Writing for his long form essay, 'Tales From the Riverbank'. He published his first novel Stray Dogs with Third Man Books, the publishing arm of Third Man Records in 2023.

He has since written articles and papers in various musical contexts, and worked mainly in higher education, as well as directing the world's first songwriting degree programme, the MMus in Songwriting, at Bath Spa University in Bath, England.
