= 60 Ft. Dolls =

Welsh rock trio

- Origin: Newport, Wales
- Genres: Hard rock, Britpop
- Years active: 1993–1998
- Labels: Indolent Records (UK); Geffen Records (US)
- Past members: Carl Bevan; Mike Cole; Richard Parfitt

60 Ft. Dolls were a Welsh rock trio active in the 1990s, known as the Cool Cymru era.

== Formation ==
They were formed in Newport in 1992 by Richard J. Parfitt and Michael Cole, who met through Donna Matthews (later of Elastica), who was at the time dating Cole and working part-time in the same pizza restaurant as Parfitt. After problems finding the right drummer, they eventually took on pastor's son Carl Bevan. Initially influenced by touring American hardcore bands that played in Newport (and in particular prominent local venue T. J.'s), the Dolls played noisy yet melodic rock, described by the NME as "grunge mod...proto-pub metal blues of the first order". In 1993, Huw Williams of the Pooh Sticks became their manager and released the debut single "Happy Shopper", named after a British convenience store chain, on his own Townhill label.

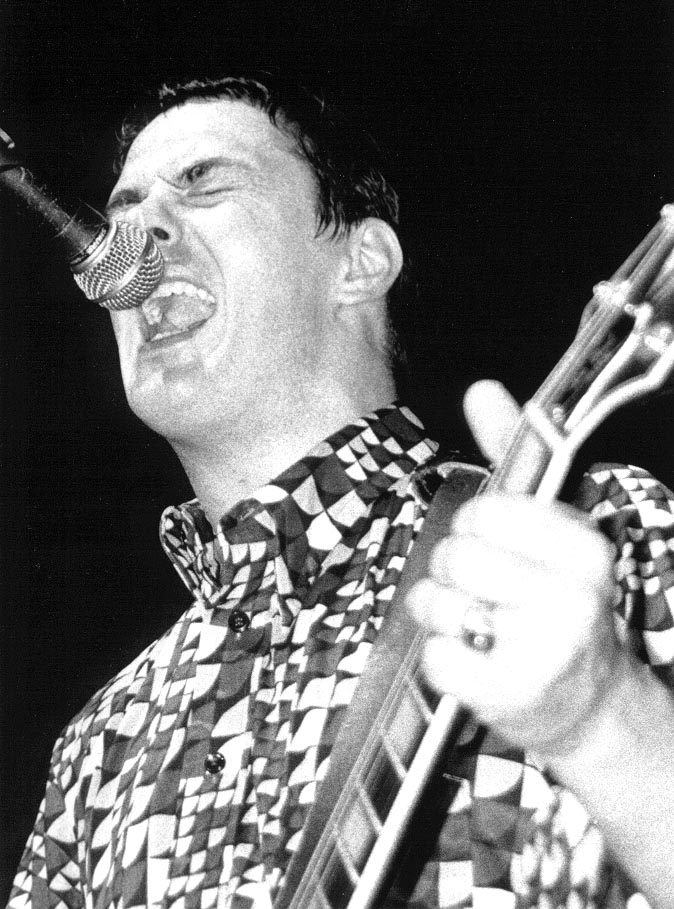
Richard Parfitt of 60ft Dolls, Southampton Guildhall 1996.

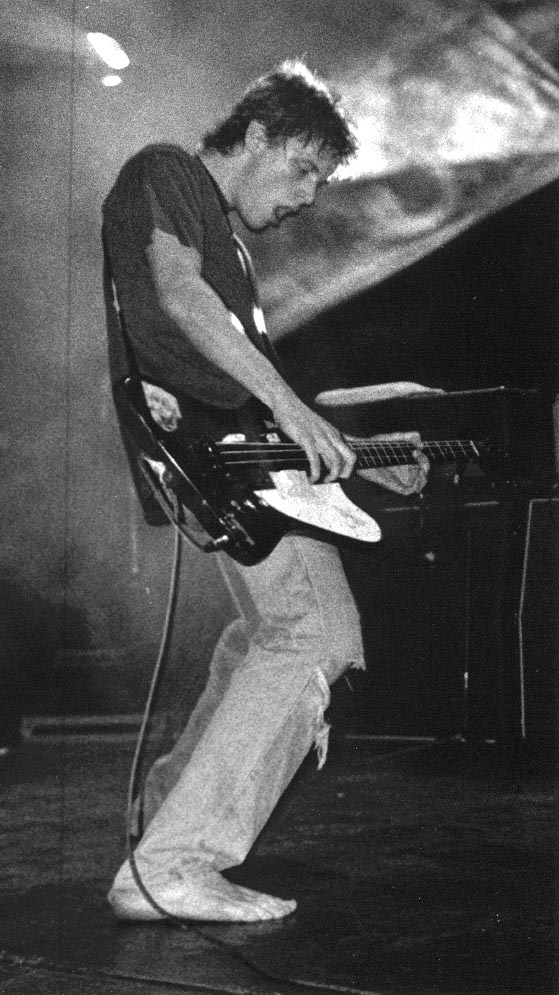
Michael Cole of 60ft Dolls, Southampton Guildhall 1996.

== Tours and 1990s success ==
In 1995 they joined the first 'BratBus' NME tour with Veruca Salt, Marion and Skunk Anansie. After support spots with Oasis, Elastica and Dinosaur Jr., 60 Ft. Dolls released their second single "White Knuckle Ride" on Rough Trade Records and then "Pig Valentine" on the RCA imprint Indolent Records. These early singles were championed heavily by BBC Radio 1 DJ Steve Lamacq, and as a consequence were picked up by influential American DJ Rodney Bingenheimer of KROQ-FM. This resulted in the band signing a deal with Geffen Records in the US. The New York Times listed "Pig Valentine" among its 1996 singles of the year. The band broke into the UK Top 40 with their fourth single "Talk to Me" (Indolent, 1996), the video for which extensively featured the Newport Transporter Bridge. This was followed by their debut album, The Big 3, which was produced by Al Clay, Reviews called it "as close to soar-away rock perfection as it's possible to imagine" by the NME and "pure, unadulterated, no nonsense, emotional, tuneful, impassioned, purposeful, hedonistic rock 'n' roll" by Melody Maker. The album was included in Select magazine's top 30 albums of 1996 and Mojo's 2003 retrospective feature "Top 12 Britpop albums of the 90s", which called it "a devilishly evocative document of the period".

The band toured extensively in the UK, Japan and Europe, including several summer festival appearances such as Glastonbury 1997 as well as opening for The Sex Pistols at their 1996 Finsbury Park reunion gig. But they were dogged by alcohol problems, and after an exhaustive three tours of the US in 1997, never toured again. They released their second album, Joya Magica, in 1998 but the band were dropped from their label deal along with other acts at Indolent and split soon after.

The band recorded two sessions for John Peel's BBC Radio 1 show, in 1996 and 1998, and appear in the top 125 Peel sessions of all time.

Mike Cole once played guitar for Newport's The Darling Buds but was asked to leave after just three gigs. He was also asked to stand in for Paul McGuigan on Oasis' 1996 tour of the US, but declined.

The track "Hair", written by Mike Cole about his then-girlfriend Donna Matthews, was placed Number 7 in Mojo's "100 Most Miserable Indie Songs of All Time" feature.

The Dolls were included, with Catatonia and others, in a House of Commons Early Day Motion, extolling the virtues of Newport's rock and roll credentials.

Carl Bevan's father, Pastor Ray Bevan, heads one of the biggest evangelical churches in the UK and once sang guest vocals on the Dolls' "Let The Spirit Move You", a 12" white label-only release, limited to one thousand copies and mixed by Wubble-U.

== Later history ==
Richard Parfitt played as a session musician after the band split, working with the likes of McAlmont & Butler and Dido, and later released a solo album called Highlights in Slow Motion in 2002. He started teaching songwriting at Bath Spa University and then in 2015 became a senior lecturer in popular and commercial music at the University of South Wales.

Welsh pop-soul singer Duffy credits Parfitt with "changing her life" and setting her on the road to fame after he hooked her up with manager Jeanette Lee.

Bevan took a few years off from music, before getting into producing into 2008. Later, he produced Black Junk, the 2011 album by Cardiff trio Exit International, which was shortlisted in the 2012 Welsh Music Awards. In 2012 the former 60 Ft. Dolls drummer launched a new project, the female-fronted rock and roll band The Lash.

The Big 3 was re-released as a 2CD special edition in 2015 by 3 Loop Music, including B-sides chosen by the band and tracks from their Peel sessions.

Bevan's death was announced on 9 August 2024. He was 51.

== Discography ==
=== Albums ===
- The Big 3 (Indolent, 1996/Geffen, 1997) UK: No. 36
- Joya Magica (Indolent/Geffen, 1998)
- The Big 3 (2CD reissue, 3 Loop Music, 2015)

=== EPs ===
- Supernatural Joy EP (Geffen, 1996)
- Hair EP (Indolent, 1996)

=== Singles ===
- "Happy Shopper" (Townhill, 1994)
- "White Knuckle Ride" (Rough Trade, 1995) UK: No. 138
- "Pig Valentine" (Indolent, 1995) UK: No. 95
- "Talk to Me" (Indolent, 1996) UK: No. 37
- "Stay" (Indolent, 1996) UK: No. 48
- "Happy Shopper" (re-recording) (Indolent, 1996)UK: No. 38
- "Alison's Room" (Indolent, 1998) UK: No. 61

=== Compilation appearances ===
- "London Breeds" on I Was a Teenage Gwent Boy (Frug Records, 1994)
- "Dr Rat" on Club Spangle (Spangle Records, 1995)
- "British Racing Green" on For Immediate Use (Raw, 1995)
- "The Universal" on Long Ago and Worlds Apart (Nippon Crown, 1995)
- "Number 1 Pure Alcohol" on Home Truths (Echo, 1995)
- "Happy Shopper" on Indie Top 20, Volume 21 (Beechwood Music, 1996)
- "Talk to Me" on Indie Top 20, Volume 23 Beechwood Music, 1996)
- "Pony Ride" on London Calling 1 (London Calling, 1996)
- "Talk to Me" on Mad for It (Telstar, 1996)
- "Stay" on The Best Album in The World Ever! Vol. 3 (Circa Records, 1996)
- "Stay" on The Magnificent Seven cassette (Melody Maker covermount, 1996)
- "Ballerina" on Dial M For Merthyr (Fierce Panda and Townhill Records, 1997)
- "Baby Says Yeah" on John Peel's Sounds Of The Suburbs (Shifty Disco 1999)
- "Talk to Me" on Shine 5 (Universal Music TV, 1996)

== See also ==
- Cool Cymru
