= Valerie Phillips =

American photographer

Valerie Phillips is a New York City-born fashion photographer, based in London.

== Biography ==
Valerie's biggest influences are things she loved as a child: outer space, gymnastics, skateboarding and the paintings of Dante Gabriel Rossetti. She grew up in New York City, cut school to compete with her skateboard team, and eventually left for London, to take photographs.

== Photography ==
Her work has appeared on album artwork including PJ Harvey, Manic Street Preachers, Amy Winehouse, Amy Macdonald and Tracey Thorn. Her commercial clients include Nike Inc., Doc Martens, Billabong, Puma, Reebok, Paul Smith, Virgin Atlantic, PF Flyers, Urban Outfitters, Goodyear, J. C. Penney, Sony PlayStation, PC World, New Look, Selfridges.

Valerie has published six books, each documenting the life of a different girl – from a Polish high school student in Brooklyn to a young teen gymnast training in Oklahoma. The latest, Amber Is For Caution, follows an ex-model studying to become a surgical technician in Kentucky.

The magazine Nylon describes her work as “gritty, graphic and bullshit free.” Her celebrity shoots have included Lindsay Lohan, Scarlett Johansson, and her portrait of Sienna Miller which resides in the permanent collection of The National Portrait Gallery. She also takes pictures in the landscapes she loves; the American Midwest, Russia, Kentish Town and Coney Island.

Her photographs have been exhibited from New York (New Museum, solo exhibitions 2002 and 2004), through Barcelona (Barcelona Museum of Contemporary Art) and Tokyo (Laforet Museum) to the small mid-western town of Cherryvale, Kansas, and most recently London, at Lazarides Gallery.

She is co-founder of the Cherryvale Skateboard Company, an art project.

== Photo books ==
- I Want to be an Astronaut, Longer Moon Farther 2001
- Look at Me, I'm Lacy, Longer Moon Farther 2002
- One More Minute for Courtney, Please, Longer Moon Farther 2003
- Monika Monster, Future First Woman on Mars, Longer Moon Farther 2005
- I Can't Believe a Girl is Playing me Metallica, picturing Norwegian actress Viktoria Winge, Longer Moon Farther 2008
- Amber is for Caution, Longer Moon Farther 2010
- stop asking me about amy I only spent a day with her, picturing British singer Amy Winehouse in Camden in the summer of 2003, PogoBooks 2013
- Hi You are Beautiful How are You, Longer Moon Farther 2014
- you left your ring on the floor of my bedroom, Longer Moon Farther 2015
- Another Girl Another Planet, Rizzoli International Publications 2016

== Exhibitions ==
- "The Joyful Bewilderment" an International Group Exhibition, October 2, 2008.
- Globe Heathrow Airport Terminal 5, August 4–25, 2010.
- Scion Installation L.A. Gallery, "The 2010 Vice Magazine Photo Show", August 14-September 4, 2010.
