= James Dean Bradfield =

Welsh singer-songwriter and musician (born 1969)

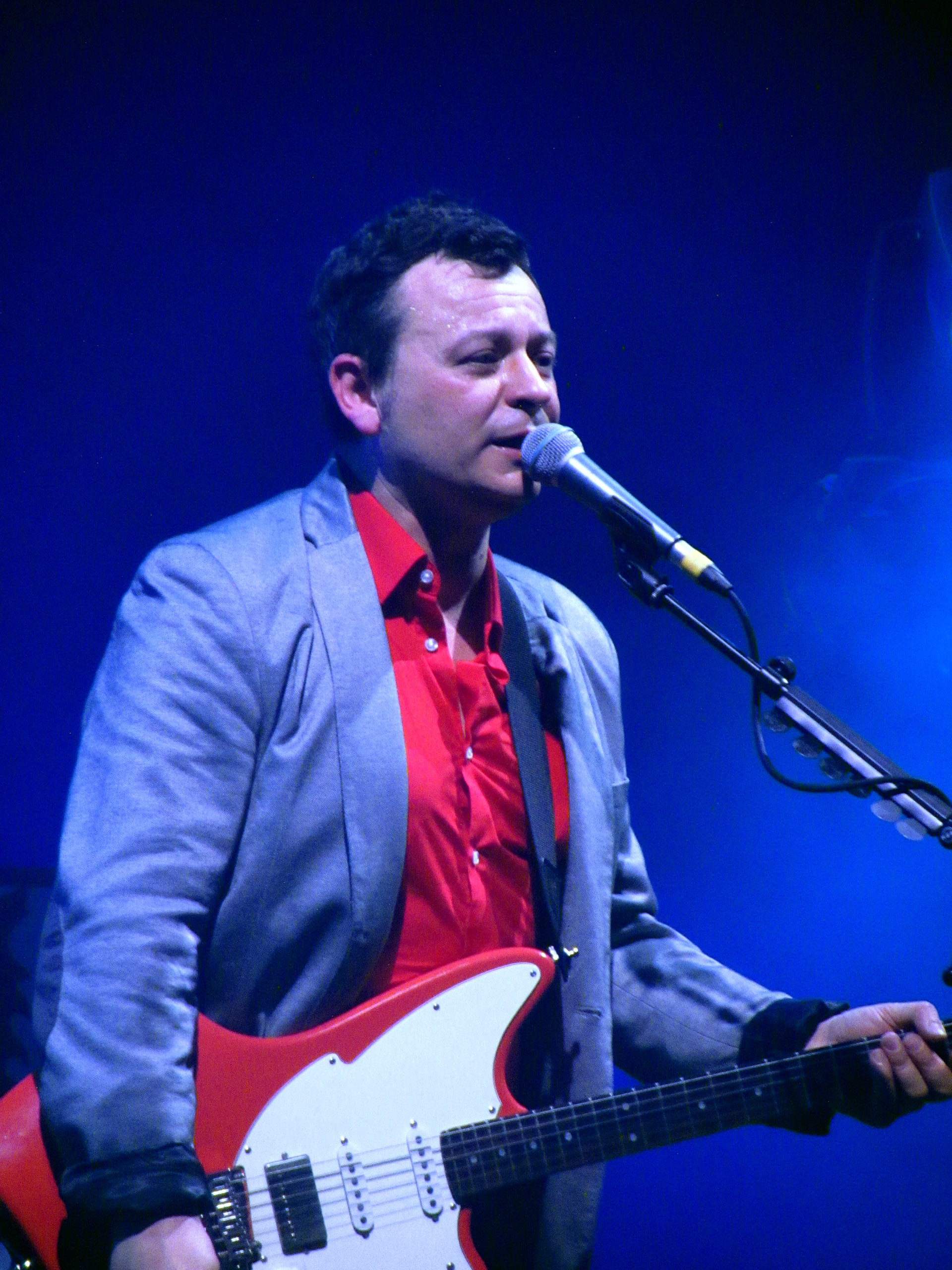
- Bradfield performing with Manic Street Preachers in 2014

Background information
- Born: 21 February 1969 (age 57); Newport, Wales
- Origin: Blackwood, Caerphilly, Wales
- Genres: Alternative rock; hard rock; post-punk; punk rock; glam punk
- Occupations: Singer; songwriter; musician; record producer
- Instruments: Vocals; guitar; bass; keyboards; omnichord
- Years active: 1986–present
- Label: Columbia

James Dean Bradfield (born 21 February 1969) is a Welsh singer-songwriter, musician and record producer. He is best known as the lead vocalist and guitarist for the Welsh alternative rock band Manic Street Preachers. His cousin Sean Moore is the band's drummer.

== Early life ==
James Dean Bradfield was born in Newport, Wales, the only son of Monty and Sue Bradfield. His father was a carpenter and trade unionist. Bradfield was raised in a terraced house at Pontllanfraith. He attended the local Oakdale Comprehensive School where he suffered years of cruelty and bullying (he claims he was "a Woody Allen-esque little nerd") for his name, lazy eye (nicknamed Crossfire), musical bent and small size. James formed a close relationship with three friends: his cousin Sean Moore, who lived with James and his family throughout their childhood after his own parents' divorce, and future bandmates Nicky Wire and Richey Edwards.

Bradfield loved to run and was a steeplechaser, and soon grew fond of punk rock band The Clash, although his earliest musical love was ELO. He gave up his dream of "being like Napoleon" and decided that he wanted to be a rock star. He learned to play guitar by learning how to play Guns N' Roses's Appetite for Destruction with the curtains drawn in his parents' front room.

== Solo career ==
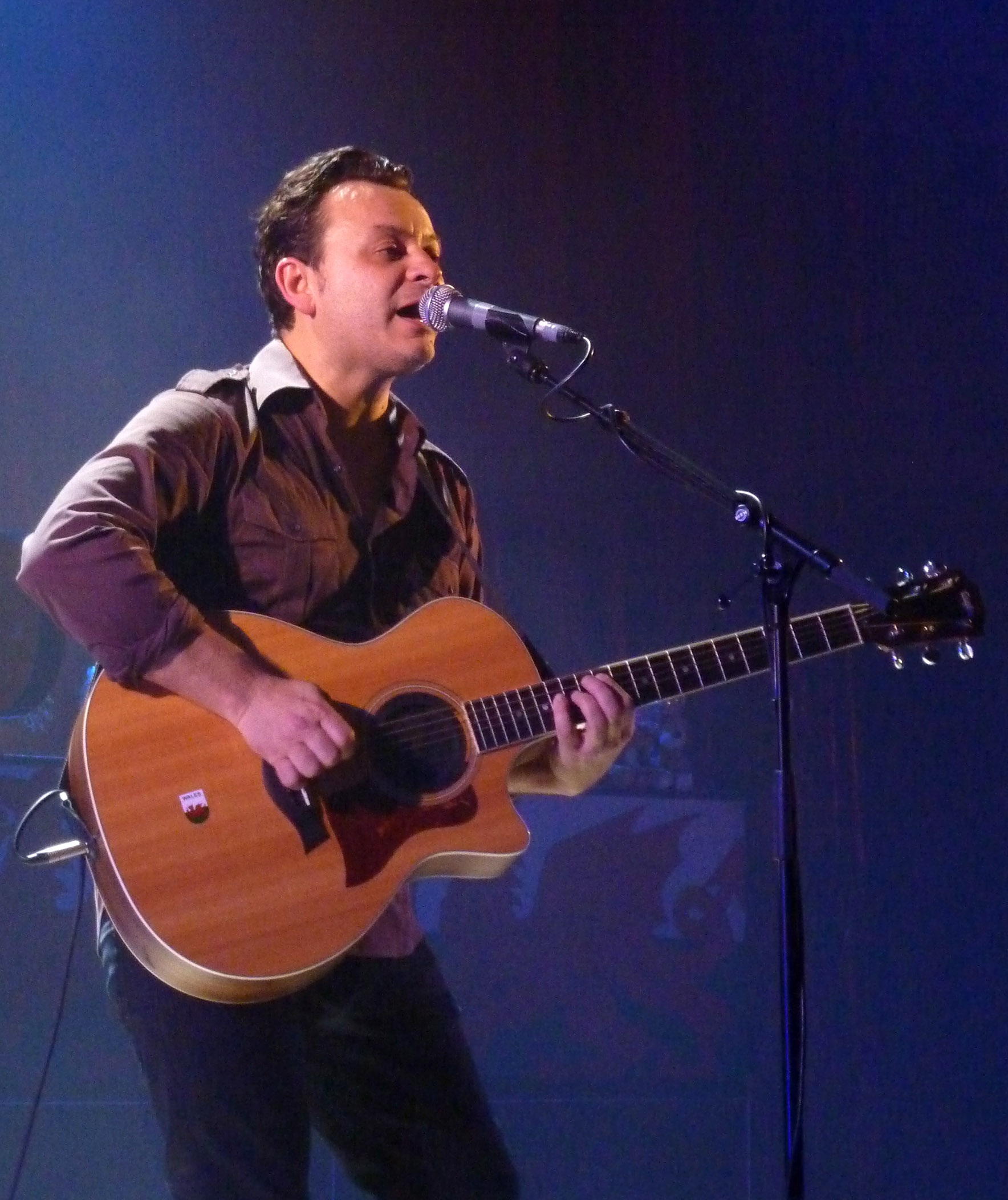
Bradfield in De Montfort Hall in 2010

In late April 2006, a track from Bradfield's debut solo single entitled "That's No Way to Tell a Lie" premiered on Janice Long's show on BBC Radio 2. It became the first single from the album and was released on 10 July while the album, entitled The Great Western, was released on 24 July. The single debuted at No. 18 in the UK Singles Chart while the album debuted at No. 22 on the album chart. The positions were considered relatively successful considering the lack of promotion.

In support of the album, Bradfield played a series of solo gigs in May 2006 in Manchester, Glasgow, Dundee, Nottingham, Birmingham, and London. The setlists consisted of tracks from The Great Western as well as several Manics tracks including "This Is Yesterday" and "Ocean Spray". He also played one further date at London ULU in June 2006, featuring a similar setlist to the other gigs. Bradfield also performed at the 2006 V Festival in late August. He embarked on his first full UK tour – consisting of 15 dates – in October. A second single, "An English Gentleman", was lifted from The Great Western before the tour and entered the UK chart at No. 31 on 1 October 2006.

The second album by Bradfield, Even in Exile, was confirmed in March 2020 to NME alongside the announcement of a 2021 Manics album. That June, the album was confirmed to be inspired by the life and death of Chilean communist activist Víctor Jara, with lyrics written as unpublished poetry by Patrick Jones. Two tracks, "There'll Come a War" and the instrumental "Seeking the Room With the Three Windows" were released the same day. The next week, the album was given a title and date alongside the launch of its first single, "The Boy From the Plantation", which debuted on Steve Lamacq's show on BBC Radio 6 Music. The album was released on 14 August 2020 on digital, CD, cassette, and vinyl and entered the UK charts at No. 6, giving Bradfield his first solo top 10 album. Bradfield released a podcast alongside the album entitled "Inspired By Jara" where he interviewed the likes of Emma Thompson and Dafydd Iwan about the life of Jara. It was produced by Steff Garrero. Bradfield also worked with Garrero on the music for the podcast The Socially Distant Sports Bar, although Bradfield is credited as "The Secret Guitarist.

== Personal life ==
Despite having once said "I always get bored of the company of women really quickly", he married the band's PR agent Mylène Halsall in a ceremony in Florence, Italy, on 11 July 2004. The couple have two children. He is a supporter of Cardiff Blues and Nottingham Forest. In 2015, Bradfield and fellow Manic Sean Moore went to Patagonia in aid of the Velindre charity.

== Musical equipment ==
=== Guitars ===
- Gibson Les Paul Custom
- Gibson Les Paul Junior
- Gibson Flying V
- Gibson ES-330
- Gibson ES-335
- Gibson Explorer
- Gibson J-45
- Fender Telecaster
- Fender Thinline Telecaster
- Fender Jazzmaster
- Fender Stratocaster
- Fender Starcaster
- Gretsch 6120 Chet Atkins model
- Gretsch White Falcon
- Guild Black Star
- Burns 12 string model
- Rickenbacker 330
- Rickenbacker 360
- Gordon Smith GS-1 double cutaway
- Fret-King Ventura 60SSH

=== Amplifiers ===
- Fender Twin
- Fender Hot Rod DeVille
- Trace Elliot Speed Twin
- Blackstar Artisan 30
- Orange Amp head
- Orange cabinet
- Marshall JCM 900
- Vox AC30
- Mesa\Boogie Lone star Special

== Discography ==
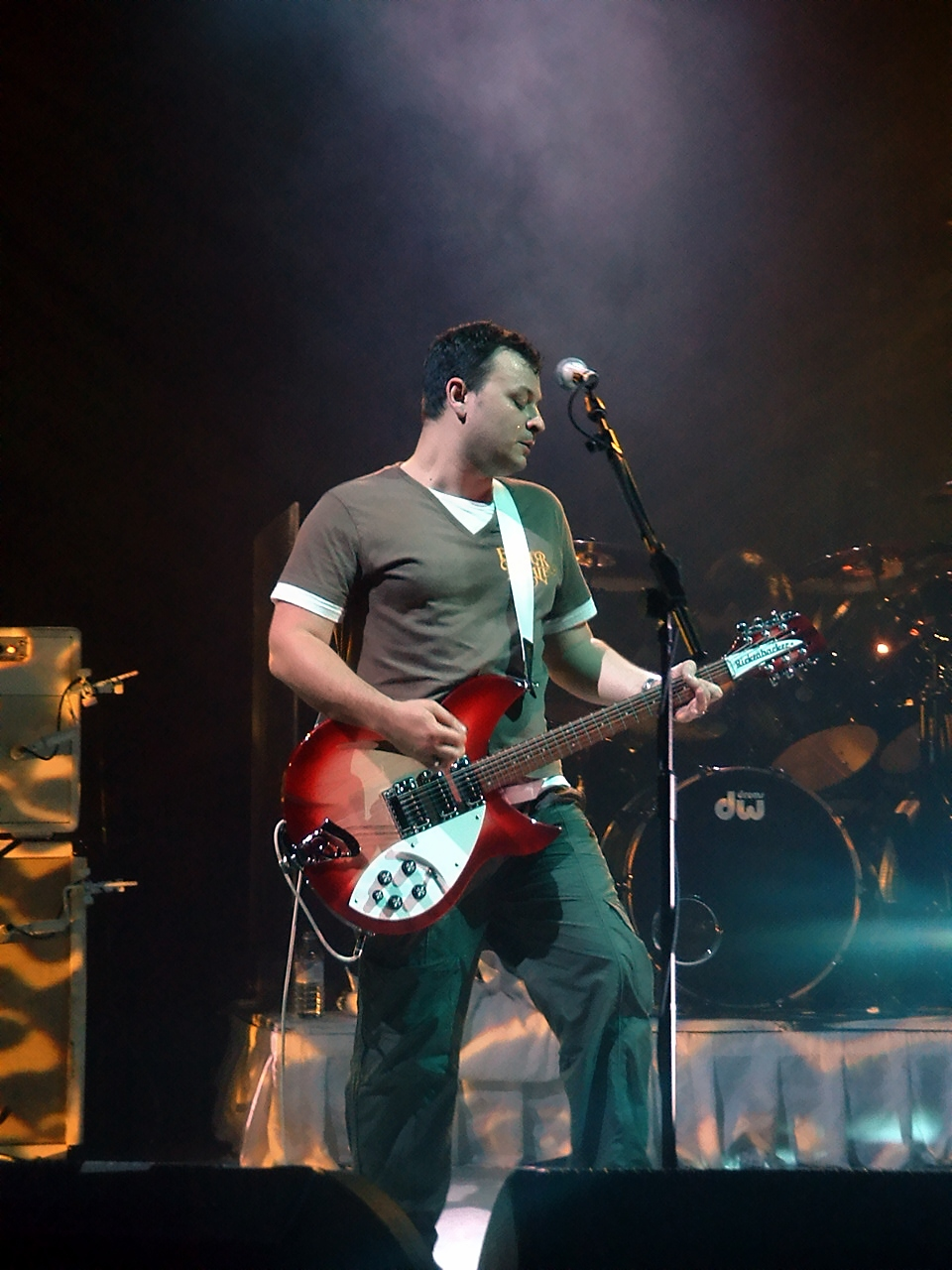
James Dean Bradfield live in London in 2005

=== Solo discography ===
==== Studio albums ====
- The Great Western (24 July 2006) – #22
- The Chamber: Original Motion Picture Soundtrack (10 March 2017)
- Even in Exile (14 August 2020) – #6

==== Singles ====
- "That's No Way to Tell a Lie" (10 July 2006) – #18
- "An English Gentleman" (25 September 2006) – #31
- "The Boy From the Plantation" (2 July 2020)

==== Collaborations ====
- "Lopez" (1996) with 808 State on album Don Solaris
- "Inertia Creeps" (1998) with Massive Attack, remix for Inertia Creeps single
- "I'm Left, You're Right, She's Gone" (1999) with Tom Jones on album Reload
- "Commemoration And Amnesia" (1999) with Patrick Jones, 2 tracks
- "Tongues for a Stammering Time" (2009) with Patrick Jones, 4 tracks
- "Turn No More" (2017) with Public Service Broadcasting on their album Every Valley
- "Dentures Out" and "Things As They Are" (2022) with The Proclaimers from album Dentures Out
- "The Exchange" (2021) The Anchoress from her album "The Art of Losing", 1 track

=== Production discography ===
- 1996: Northern Uproar – Northern Uproar (studio album)
- 1997: Kylie Minogue – Impossible Princess (studio album, co-producer on 2 tracks)
- 1999: Tom Jones – Reload (studio album, co-producer on 1 track)
- 2004: Johnny Boy – "You Are The Generation That Bought More Shoes And You Get What You Deserve" (single)

== Bibliography ==
- Price, Simon (1999). Everything (A Book About Manic Street Preachers) (first ed.). Virgin Publishing. ISBN 0-7535-0139-2.
- Clarke, Martin (1997). Manic Street Preachers: Sweet Venom (first ed.). Plexus Publishing. ISBN 0-85965-259-9.
