= Leaving the 20th Century =

Video by Manic Street Preachers
- Released: 3 July 2000
- Recorded: 31 December 1999
- Venue: Millennium Stadium, Cardiff, Wales
- Genre: Alternative rock
- Label: Sony

Manic Street Preachers video album chronology
| Everything Live (1997) | Leaving the 20th Century (2000) | Louder Than War (2001) |

Leaving the 20th Century is a concert film of the Welsh alternative rock band Manic Street Preachers's performance at Manic Millennium, Millennium Stadium, Cardiff, Wales on New Year's Eve 1999. The concert celebrated the 10th anniversary of the band and was performed in front of more than 57,000 fans. The event became international when the final song, "A Design for Life", was broadcast live all over the world via satellite.

The concert was released on VHS and DVD on 3 July 2000 by Sony Music Video and includes interview clips in which the band discuss their history and the songs, plus an extra feature performance of "Ready for Drowning" and "If You Tolerate This Your Children Will Be Next", recorded at Château de la Motte, France in 1998.

== Track listing ==
1. Introduction
2. "You Stole the Sun from My Heart"
3. "Faster"
4. "Everything Must Go"
5. "Tsunami"
6. "The Masses Against the Classes"
7. "The Everlasting"
8. "Kevin Carter"
9. "La Tristesse Durera (Scream to a Sigh)"
10. "Rock and Roll Music"
11. "Ready for Drowning"
12. "Of Walking Abortion"
13. "No Surface All Feeling"
14. "Motown Junk"
15. "Motorcycle Emptiness"
16. "Can't Take My Eyes Off You"
17. "Small Black Flowers that Grow in the Sky"
18. "Australia"
19. "Elvis Impersonator: Blackpool Pier"
20. "You Love Us"
21. "Stay Beautiful"
22. "If You Tolerate This Your Children Will Be Next"
23. "A Design for Life"
24. Closing credits

== Personnel ==
- James Dean Bradfield – guitar, vocals
- Nicky Wire – bass guitar
- Sean Moore – drums
- Nick Nasmyth – keyboards
