= Rewind the Film =

Studio album by Manic Street Preachers
- Released: 16 September 2013
- Recorded: 2013
- Studio: Faster, Cardiff, Wales; Rockfield, Monmouthshire, Wales; Hansa Studios, Berlin, Germany
- Genre: Folk rock
- Length: 47:29
- Label: Columbia
- Producer: Manic Street Preachers; Alex Silva; Loz Williams

Manic Street Preachers chronology
National Treasures – The Complete Singles (2011)	Rewind the Film (2013)	Futurology (2014)

Singles from Rewind the Film
- 1. "Show Me the Wonder" Released: 9 September 2013; 2. "Anthem for a Lost Cause" Released: 25 November 2013

Rewind the Film is the eleventh studio album by Welsh alternative rock band Manic Street Preachers, released on 16 September 2013 by Columbia Records. The sound is very different from previous records and is more acoustic-driven. It features guests Lucy Rose, Cate Le Bon and Richard Hawley.

The album debuted and peaked at number four in the UK Albums Chart.

== Production ==
Rewind the Film was recorded in the Manics' Faster studio in Cardiff, Rockfield Studios in Monmouthshire, and Hansa Studios in Berlin. In a statement, the band announced, "(If) this record has a relation in the Manics back catalogue, it's probably the sedate coming of age that was This Is My Truth Tell Me Yours."

Rewind the Film is the first of two new albums the Manics recorded in 2013. In February 2013, the band announced via Twitter, "MSP were in the great Hansa Studios in January with Alex Silva (who recorded The Holy Bible with us). Berlin was inspirational... Sean been playing a french horn in the studio today – sounding wonderful."

In May 2013, the Manics announced that they were in the process of recording two new albums simultaneously, with 35 new songs being recorded, with some of the material to be featured on their next album, Futurology. Vocalist/lead guitarist James Dean Bradfield told the NME, "We've nearly finished mixing this [the first album]. It's much more acoustic based – I think there's one electric guitar on the entire record. But it's not Campfire Street Preachers, we're not banging boxes or anything... The lead track sounds like a mix between "Rocks Off"-era Stones and Vegas-era Elvis." Bradfield also revealed, "I can tell you that both albums will be very different from each other in terms of style... One will be more acoustic and gentle in nature with lots of horns and a real atlantic soul element to it, while the other's going to be way more spikey with lots and lots of electric guitar on there."

After recording the new material, the Manics embarked on a three-date concert tour of Australia and New Zealand in June–July 2013, in tandem with the British & Irish Lions rugby union tour of Australia. The Manics did not perform any new songs during this tour; bassist/lyricist Nicky Wire explained,

[the new album is] kinda the exact opposite of what we're doing at the moment... This tour has been kind of raucous, a mixture of rock 'n' roll and rugby, food, pleasure, whereas the album is very melancholic...a lot of interior feelings, very soft for us, very delicate...so we're kinda getting all the rock 'n' roll out of our system on this trip, and then the album is a totally different beast, actually... It's a lot more acoustic, there's lots of acoustic guitars. There's very little of James' electric guitar, which is obviously pretty much our trademark... It's a big thing, he's still going cold turkey through not doing any guitar solos on the album!

During "The Lions Tour," the Manics tweeted a photo of a CD with "Manic Street Preachers Rewind The Film 18/6/13" written on it. They also posted the message, "Manics fans might want to listen to 6music Monday morning." The song "Rewind the Film", featuring former Longpigs guitarist Richard Hawley and based on A Little Girl Lost by David Axelrod, premiered online and on BBC Radio 6 on 8 July 2013. The new album's title and release date were announced officially on the Manics' official website on the same day.

In June 2013, Richard Hawley discussed how he came to work with the Manics:

James just rang me. I've respected him for a long time. I love that [the Manics] stand for something and that they've stood by it, unlike a lot of bands and politicians. I met James at that Shirley Bassey concert because we both wrote songs for her. I was sat at the side of the stage just watching her and completely in awe, then James just came up and tapped me on the shoulder and we just sat together completely enthralled by Ms Bassey. We got chatting afterwards and it turns out that both of our fathers were first-wave teddy boy bikers. You don't meet many other people like that. It was a shared experience we had of growing up with people who were fairly fucking wild. We swapped phone numbers and texted each other occasionally, but he was off having a family and a break while I was away on the road, then he just phoned me and said, "We've written this song and all decided that you have to sing it or it won’t go on the album." So I just said, "I can’t let you down," and it was a great honour I drove down to Cardiff in a day and it's a really beautiful song. I play a bit of Hawaiian guitar on it and it's me and James doing a duet. He sings one part and I sing another. Nick wrote the words I sing and James wrote his bit, so it's a very personal song and I was surprised that Nicky wanted me to sing it, but now that I've done it I can see why. It's quite dramatic and acoustic.

Other guest artists on Rewind the Film include Lucy Rose on the track "This Sullen Welsh Heart" and Cate Le Bon on the track "4 Lonely Roads." The Manics revealed Le Bon's involvement in March 2013, posting, "The brilliant Cate Le Bon has given us a stunning vocal on a new Manics track-Four Lonely Roads-her voice is so pure+beautiful. Very excited." James Dean Bradfield claimed that guest vocalists were brought onto the album as he felt his own voice wasn't good enough for all of the new songs: "I've got a sneaking feeling that I've been singing our songs for so long it's hard to find something new as a vocalist. It's easier as a drummer or a bassist to find a different direction, but if you try to change the sound of your voice, you end up sounding like a dick... And I felt my voice, at this point, was underselling some of the songs. There's no point in having an ego about it. I don't care if someone else is going to sing (the songs). I've had enough props and glory."

The Manics revealed to the NME that the Rewind the Film track "30-Year War" is an anti-Margaret Thatcher song written long before the former Prime Minister's death in 2013. James Dean Bradfield described "30-Year War" as the most "angry" track on the album, and Nicky Wire said, "It starts with the miners' strike and moves through Hillsborough, and it's a critique of the attack on the working classes over the last 30 years. It's the most spiteful, angry track on the album, and it's almost the link to the other record – it sounds like Lodger-era Bowie."

Nicky Wire provided a detailed track-by-track review of Rewind the Film for The Quietus, published online on 4 September 2013. Wire also said, "We wrote '3 Ways to See Despair' for Morrissey but we were too scared to ask him. He's the one person I couldn't bear rejection from. I can take it from most people."

In July 2013, BBC Radio 6 revealed that the second album recorded by the Manics in 2013 is titled Futurology and has a tentative release date of June 2014. Regarding that album, James Dean Bradfield has stated, "It's a lot spikier and shinier. It's much more band-based, a tiny bit of Krautrock influence. It's not like The Holy Bible but there's a bit of the same intent and threat. Lyrically, it's got a European fascination. The landscape of Europe, the malaise of Europe, the malaise of us Brits not feeling part of it. We're not talking like the Tories, don't worry – there's not a song where we opt out of Europe. The lead track is me singing half in English and half in German." Nicky Wire told the NME, "I think by next March or April, we'll have it all ready... It's not just chucking something out; it's really fully formed. It's the next step on from The Holy Bible and Journal for Plague Lovers. It's quite intense but synthetic as well."

== Music ==
Dorian Lynskey called "Rewind the Film" the "acoustic-based album they'd been talking about making for 20 years". The original inspiration for a Manic Street Preachers acoustic record came from Bruce Springsteen and his 1982 album Nebraska.

The song "4 Lonely Roads" was inspired by the sound of "The Two of Us" by The Beatles and the poetry of A. E. Housman. "3 Ways to See Despair" has been described as "Neil Young recording Harvest in Hanza";. Nicky Wire said of the song that the band were aiming for "something like [The Beatles'] White Album produced by Steve Albini". The title track "Rewind the Film" originated from Wire singing over David Axelrod's "Little Girl Lost".

== Release ==
Rewind the Film was released in standard and deluxe versions. It was also released digitally and on vinyl.

The deluxe version of Rewind the Film includes a second disc, featuring demo versions of all twelve album tracks, plus live versions of "There by the Grace of God", "Stay Beautiful", "Your Love Alone Is Not Enough", "The Love of Richard Nixon" and "Revol". All live tracks were recorded at the Manics' "A Night of National Treasures" concert at The O2 Arena, London on 17 December 2011. Also released from the same concert were live versions of "Let Robeson Sing" (as a free MP3 download on the Manics' website in June 2013), and "Tsunami" (as a B-side on the "Show Me the Wonder" single).

The album sold around 20.000 copies in the first week of sales, which resulted in debuting and peaking at number 4 in the UK Album Chart spending a total of 6 weeks in the Top 100, in Ireland the album charted at number 5 and reached the Top 40 in Finland, Germany and Norway.

The Manics supported Rewind the Film with a 7-date tour of the UK and Ireland from 13 to 29 September 2013.

The first single from Rewind the Film, "Show Me the Wonder", was released on 9 September 2013, a week ahead of the album. "Show Me the Wonder" premiered on the Manics' official website on 22 July 2013. Referencing the song on their Twitter account, the Manics posted, "I think 'show me the wonder' is the 1st ever manics single without JDBs electric guitar on-xx."

In an interview for Digital Spy, Nicky Wire said, "'Show Me the Wonder' came late. It was very natural, we were listening to loads of Elvis, '70s Vegas Elvis, and James just thought he'd come up with a radio hit single. We still think like that, we're not particularly snobbish about it. It's the one song on the album that is very uplifting. It has been a radio hit so I've got to give it to him! It came very late and I think we were a bit nervous about it. But it's got a kind of '70s class about it that sort of fits in. Just about." Wire stated that the album's next single would be either "As Holy as the Soil (That Buries Your Skin)" or "Anthem for a Lost Cause". It was subsequently announced that the second single from Rewind the Film would be "Anthem for a Lost Cause", which was released on 25 November 2013.

== Reception ==
Professional ratings
Aggregate scores
Source	Rating
Metacritic	80/100
Review scores
Source	Rating
AllMusic	4/5 stars
Clash	8/10
Digital Spy	4/5 stars
Drowned in Sound	positive
Gigwise	8/10
The Guardian	4/5 stars
The Independent	5/5 stars
musicOMH	4.5/5 stars
NME	7/10
Q	4/5 stars

Upon the release of the album, it was praised by music critics, receiving very positive reviews. At Metacritic the album holds a score of 80 out of 100, which indicates "generally favorable reviews", based on 18 reviews.

Stephen Thomas Erlewine of AllMusic said that Rewind the Film is "achieving an appealingly woozy, early-hours-of-the morning vibe", giving the album a score of 4/5, concluding with "Occasionally, Nicky Wire's lyrics drift back toward free-floating angst – "my ecosystem is based on hatred" is a line that feels perpetually adolescent—but the combined effect of the sometimes tortured words and the gentle, never-conflicting currents of folk, anthemic rock, cinematic instrumentals, and mannered pop create a welcome impression of a group that acknowledges that they've entered a comfortable middle age but are happy to fight against complacency however they can."

Clash magazine also reviewed Rewind the Film very positively, giving the album a score of eight out of ten stars. Gareth James wrote, "After opening with the line "I don't want my children to grow up like me" free of any accompaniment, the electric guitar is banished, while Cate Le Bon and Richard Hawley guest elsewhere. The biting nostalgia of middle age runs throughout the lyrics and the band's desire to produce something akin to Automatic for the People is largely fulfilled." Awarding the album a 7/10 rating, Jamie Fullerton of the NME described it as "a subtle, satisfying record that showcases their continuing ability to soar, albeit without digging anywhere near as deep as their politico-punk-pop totems, 1992’s Generation Terrorists and 1996’s Everything Must Go. Musically, it's their safest album yet... Legacy-wise, though, it could be their most unsafe album."

The album hails the beginning of chapter 3 in the history of the band (the first having ended with Richey Edwards' disappearance, the second – with the National Treasures singles collection release and the December 2011 concert in The O2 Arena), according to Niall Doherty of Q. "Rewind the Film emerges hazy and delicate, as if creators have just awoken from a long, deep sleep, distant memories of themselves coming back slowly in focus," the critic wrote, giving it a 4/5 rating.

== Track listing ==
All tracks are written by James Dean Bradfield, Nick Jones and Sean Moore except where noted.

No.	Title	Writer(s)	Length
1.	"This Sullen Welsh Heart" (featuring Lucy Rose)		4:13
2.	"Show Me the Wonder"		3:18
3.	"Rewind the Film" (featuring Richard Hawley)	Bradfield, Jones, Moore, David Axelrod	6:36
4.	"Builder of Routines"		2:28
5.	"4 Lonely Roads" (featuring Cate Le Bon)		2:54
6.	"(I Miss the) Tokyo Skyline"		3:46
7.	"Anthem for a Lost Cause"		3:51
8.	"As Holy as the Soil (That Buries Your Skin)"		3:20
9.	"3 Ways to See Despair"		3:16
10.	"Running Out of Fantasy"		4:09
11.	"Manorbier"		4:31
12.	"30-Year War"		5:07
Total length:			47:29

Japanese bonus track
No.	Title	Length
13.	"Death of a Digital Ghost"	3:37
Total length:		51:06

Deluxe Edition bonus disc
No.	Title	Writer(s)	Length
1.	"This Sullen Welsh Heart" (demo)		3:56
2.	"Show Me the Wonder" (demo)		3:19
3.	"Rewind the Film" (demo)	Bradfield, Jones, Moore, Axelrod	6:15
4.	"Builder of Routines" (demo)		2:42
5.	"4 Lonely Roads" (demo)		2:45
6.	"(I Miss The) Tokyo Skyline" (demo)		3:11
7.	"Anthem for a Lost Cause" (demo)		3:22
8.	"As Holy as the Soil (That Buries Your Skin)" (demo)		3:19
9.	"3 Ways to See Despair" (demo)		3:14
10.	"Running Out of Fantasy" (demo)		4:05
11.	"Manorbier" (demo)		3:27
12.	"30-Year War" (demo)		4:56
13.	"There by the Grace of God" (live at the O2)		4:00
14.	"Stay Beautiful" (live at the O2)	Bradfield, Richey Edwards, Jones, Moore	3:19
15.	"Your Love Alone Is Not Enough" (live at the O2)		3:50
16.	"The Love of Richard Nixon" (live at the O2)		3:33
17.	"Revol" (live at the O2)	Bradfield, Edwards, Jones, Moore	3:35
Total length:			1:02:56

Japanese Deluxe Edition - Limited Edition (Digibook)
No.	Title	Writer(s)	Length
18.	"Life Becoming a Landslide" (live at the O2)	Bradfield, Edwards, Jones, Moore
19.	"Little Baby Nothing" (live at the O2)	Bradfield, Edwards, Jones, Moore

== Personnel ==
Manic Street Preachers

- James Dean Bradfield – lead vocals, lead and rhythm guitar, production
- Sean Moore – drums, production
- Nicky Wire – bass guitar, vocals, drums (5), production

Additional musicians

- Lucy Rose – co-lead vocals (1)
- Richard Hawley – co-lead vocals (3); Hawaiian guitar (3)
- Cate Le Bon – co-lead vocals (5)
- Loz Williams – keyboards (1, 4–8, 10–11)
- Gavin Fitzjohn – horn arrangement (2, 7); baritone and tenor saxophone (2); trumpet (2, 7)
- John Rey – piano (2)
- Andy Walters and Joanna Walters – violin (3)
- Barnard Kane – viola (3)
- Nathan Stone – cello (3)
- Tim Tautorat – celeste (4); string arrangement (10); violin (10); keyboards (10)
- Sean Read – horn arrangement (7, 8); trumpets (7, 8); saxophone (8)
- Nick Nasmyth – keyboards (12)

Technical personnel

- Loz Williams – all engineering; production on all tracks except 4 and 10; additional production on tracks 4 and 10; mixing on tracks 1 and 5
- Alex Silva – production on tracks 4 and 10; additional production on track 9
- Guy Massey – mixing on all tracks except 1, 3, 5 and 12
- Dave Eringa – mixing on tracks 3 and 12
- Tim Young – mastering
- Farrow – design
- Alex Lake – band photograph
- Nicky Wire – all other images

== Charts ==
Chart performance for Rewind the Film
Chart (2013)	Peak position
Austrian Albums (Ö3 Austria)	62
Belgian Albums (Ultratop Flanders)	74
Belgian Albums (Ultratop Wallonia)	114
Dutch Albums (Album Top 100)	62
Finnish Albums (Suomen virallinen lista)	27
German Albums (Offizielle Top 100)	31
Irish Albums (IRMA)	5
Norwegian Albums (VG-lista)	31
Scottish Albums (OCC)	4
Spanish Albums (PROMUSICAE)	47
Swiss Albums (Schweizer Hitparade)	51
UK Albums (OCC)	4

== Certifications ==
Certifications for Rewind the Film
Region	Certification	Certified units/sales
United Kingdom (BPI)	Silver	60,000^{‡}
^{‡} Sales+streaming figures based on certification alone.
