= Everything Live =

Video by Manic Street Preachers
- Released: 29 September 1997
- Recorded: 24 May 1997
- Venue: NYNEX Arena, Manchester, England
- Genre: Alternative rock
- Label: Sony

Manic Street Preachers video album chronology
Everything Live (1997)	Leaving the 20th Century (2000)

Everything Live is a concert film of the Welsh alternative rock band Manic Street Preachers' performance at the NYNEX Arena, Manchester, England on 24 May 1997. Along with the 1996 album Everything Must Go, it captures the band's comeback following the disappearance of their rhythm guitarist and lyricist Richey Edwards and their transition to being a major band. On the tenth anniversary edition of Everything Must Go, bassist Nicky Wire cites the concert as the moment he knew that the band had "made it".

The film was released as a VHS video on 29 September 1997 by Sony Music Video, and the full concert was later released on DVD as part of the Everything Must Go 20th Anniversary Edition reissue.

Everything Live was directed by Dick Carruthers. The first 12,000 copies came with five postcards featuring photographs of the band by their official photographer Mitch Ikeda.

== Track listing ==
1. "Introduction: A Design For Life (Stealth Sonic Orchestra Mix)"
2. "Everything Must Go"
3. "Enola/Alone"[*]
4. "Faster"
5. "Kevin Carter"
6. "La Tristesse Durera (Scream to a Sigh)"
7. "Removables"[*]
8. "Roses in the Hospital"
9. "Elvis Impersonator: Blackpool Pier"
10. "The Girl Who Wanted To Be God"[*]
11. "Motown Junk"
12. "Motorcycle Emptiness"
13. "No Surface All Feeling"
14. "This Is Yesterday"
15. "Small Black Flowers That Grow in the Sky"[*]
16. "Raindrops Keep Fallin' On My Head"[*]
17. "Yes"[*]
18. "Australia"
19. "Stay Beautiful"[*]
20. "A Design for Life"
21. "You Love Us"

[*] Only included on the Everything Must Go 20th Anniversary Edition DVD Disc 1

It also includes an exclusive interview and documentary footage interspersed between songs.

== Personnel ==
- James Dean Bradfield – guitar, vocals
- Nicky Wire – bass guitar
- Sean Moore – drums
- Nick Nasmyth – keyboards
- Barbara Snow – trumpet on "Kevin Carter"
