= This Is My Truth Tell Me Yours =

1998 album by Manic Street Preachers

Studio album by Manic Street Preachers
- Released: 14 September 1998
- Recorded: 1997–1998
- Studios: Chateau de la Rouge Motte (Normandy, France); Monnow Valley (Monmouth, Wales); Rockfield (Rockfield, Wales)
- Genres: Alternative rock; soft rock; post-Britpop
- Length: 63:19
- Label: Epic
- Producers: Mike Hedges; Dave Eringa

Manic Street Preachers chronology
Everything Must Go (1996)	This Is My Truth Tell Me Yours (1998)	Know Your Enemy (2001)

Singles from This Is My Truth Tell Me Yours
- 1. "If You Tolerate This Your Children Will Be Next" Released: 24 August 1998; 2. "The Everlasting" Released: 30 November 1998; 3. "Nobody Loved You" Released: 9 December 1998 (Japan only); 4. "You Stole the Sun from My Heart" Released: 8 March 1999; 5. "Tsunami" Released: 5 July 1999

This Is My Truth Tell Me Yours is the fifth studio album by Welsh alternative rock band Manic Street Preachers, released on 14 September 1998 by Epic Records.

Like its 1996 predecessor Everything Must Go, This Is My Truth Tell Me Yours was a commercial and critical success. The album debuted at number one in the UK Albums Chart, selling 136,000 copies, going Gold in the first week. It sold well in the United Kingdom, Europe and Asia, and represented a change in the sound from the furious alternative rock sound to a more melodic and tender approach. By March 1999 the album was Triple Platinum in the UK alone and since its release it has sold more than five million copies worldwide. It earned the band further nominations and accolades at the BRIT Awards in 1999. This is their first album whose lyrics were solely written by bassist Nicky Wire; and not featured any contribution from the late rhythm guitarist Richey Edwards.

== Music and lyrics ==
The title is a quotation taken from a speech given by Aneurin Bevan, a Labour Party politician from Wales. Its working title was simply Manic Street Preachers. The cover photograph was taken on Black Rock Sands near Porthmadog, Wales.

It was the first Manics album to feature lyrics solely by Nicky Wire, while all the music was written by the duo of James Dean Bradfield and Sean Moore. This Is My Truth Tell Me Yours shows considerably less hard rock influence than their previous efforts and finds the band experimenting with sound and production techniques. It features cleaner guitar sounds in general and the increased use of additional instrumentation such as strings, keyboards and both real and programmed percussion. Clash magazine described the album's sound as "a glacial distillation of the anthemic rock that had served them so well two years previous", an approach further developed on 2004's Lifeblood.

In an interview Dave Eringa admitted that: "James was piling on the pressure at the time. He's got this idea that I work best under pressure; it's about putting me under as much as he can all the time!". After recording "If You Tolerate This Your Children Will Be Next", he also said that the song went through a four-month gestation period.

Eringa said that even in the week of release he was nervous: "You get midweek chart positions and sales figures all week, and it was my first chance of a possible Number One, which is such an exciting thing. Every day it was just getting worse and worse; I was becoming more and more psychotic. If it had been released the same week as a Nirvana record or an Oasis record, you'd just have to put your hands up and say 'c'est la vie' – but the horror of losing out to Steps would have been unbelievable!". James Dean Bradfield has cited John Frusciante as the main influence for the intro riff of "My Little Empire".

== Release ==
The album was preceded by the single "If You Tolerate This Your Children Will Be Next", released on 24 August 1998, which debuted at No. 1 on the UK Singles Chart, their first single to do so. The album itself was released on 14 September 1998, and its sales were such that a spokesperson for Virgin Megastores claimed it to be the biggest selling album of the year. It reached No. 1 on the UK Albums Chart, becoming their only album to do so until The Ultra Vivid Lament reached the same position in 2021. Like the preceding single, This Is My Truth Tell Me Yours prevented Steps from topping the chart; "One for Sorrow" was held off at No. 2 by "If You Tolerate This Your Children Will Be Next" while the album Step One was also relegated to No. 2. The album remained at the top of the albums chart for three weeks, selling around 250,000 copies in those three weeks. The album has been certified Triple Platinum in the UK and spent a total time of 75 weeks on the UK Albums Chart Top 100.

Apart from the lead single, the album presented another three singles, with the second one being "The Everlasting", issued on 30 November 1998. "You Stole the Sun from My Heart" was released on 8 March 1999 and was nominated for Best British Single at the 2000 BRIT Awards. The final single from the album, issued on 5 July 1999, was "Tsunami", which was inspired by the Silent Twins, June and Jennifer Gibbons, who gave up speaking when they were young, became involved in crime and ended up being sent to Broadmoor Hospital. Both singles "The Everlasting" and "Tsunami" peaked at number 11, while "You Stole the Sun from My Heart" ended up peaking at number 5 on the UK Singles Chart. In Japan, the band released another single, "Nobody Loved You", on 9 December 1998.

Around the world the album was as successful as it was in the UK. In Sweden the album managed to remain in the chart for a total of 43 weeks, debuting at number 2, and peaking at number one in its second week. In Finland the album sold enough to stay in the charts for 32 weeks, peaking at number one, securing the top spot for two consecutive weeks. In Ireland the album also debuted at number one and charted within the top 20 in Norway, New Zealand, Denmark, Austria and Australia. It was the number one album in Europe's for two weeks, and it has been certified Platinum (one million copies) by the International Federation of the Phonographic Industry. The album's success ensured that by 1999 the band had sold more than three million albums worldwide. To the present day This Is My Truth Tell Me Yours has sold more than five million copies since its release.

On 7 December 2018, This Is My Truth Tell Me Yours was re-released as a '20 Year Collector's Edition' on streaming services, as well as physically on three CDs and two LPs. As well as being remastered, the track listing was revised, with "Nobody Loved You" replaced by the former B-side "Prologue to History". The CD and streaming releases also include various demos, B-sides and remixes.

== Controversy ==
The album's final track, "S.Y.M.M." is an initialism for "South Yorkshire Mass Murderer". The title is a reference to actions of South Yorkshire Police in the Hillsborough disaster of 1989, in which 97 people died in a human crush during an association football match at the Hillsborough Stadium in Sheffield. Although he admitted to not having heard the song, the title was criticised by South Yorkshire's then Assistant Chief Constable, Ian Daines as "offensive" and "bad taste". At the time of the album's release, the actions of the police were the subject of a long-running and ongoing private prosecution by the Hillsborough Families Support Group. However the track was praised by Jimmy McGovern, who is name-checked in the song itself. McGovern stated that he felt the sentiment of the song was "brilliant" and that he was taken back by the "power" of the lyrics, adding "I've heard those sentiments (how do you sleep at night, etc) expressed by many of the Hillsborough families".

== Critical reception ==
Professional ratings
Review scores
Source	Rating
AllMusic	4/5 stars
Entertainment Weekly	C−
The Guardian	4/5 stars
The Independent	4/5 stars
Mojo	4/5 stars
NME	7/10
Pitchfork	9.5/10
Q	4/5 stars
Select	4/5
Uncut	8/10

The album was generally well received by critics.

NME awarded the album with a 7/10, stating: "No longer is James Dean Bradfield required to turn metrical somersaults in order to translate screeds of vituperative prose into the realm of the performable. Nicky's opaque verses lend themselves more readily to poetic contemplation, and James responds with his most incontrovertibly delicate vocals, singing as opposed to lacerating his larynx in the quest for empathy."

Sputnikmusic wrote in 2014 that the album was "the most indecisive piece of works [sic] in the Manic's [sic] canon. Technically proficient and brilliantly written in spats", finishing with: "Still, This Is My Truth's spot as one of the bands [sic] weakest releases is often overstated, if only because the rot was just beginning and the future predicted a bigger storm to come."

Sarah Zupko, writing for Pitchfork, said that the album was her "album of the year so far", stating that "The Manic Street Preachers are also one of the few groups capable of integrating orchestral instruments in a way that still produces great rock music (check out the cello in "My Little Empire"), always avoiding the schmaltzy elevator music that can result when some rock musos get a hold of an orchestra. Meanwhile, they manage to infuse some quite dour lyrics with some of the most haunting melodies in rock this side of Radiohead. Bradfield and Moore seldom choose the obvious chords, arrangements and melodies, resulting in music that is heads- and- tails above almost any band on the planet."

The Independent gave the album a positive review, saying that: "In their first album as a true trio, the Manics deliver another slab of anthemic rock that manages to be gloomy yet uplifting. Their recent hit single is one of the more joyous moments here, but they also offer class introspection."

AllMusic praised the album, calling it "a strangely effective fusion of string-drenched, sweeping arena rock and impassioned, brutally honest punk", noting that it contains "a searing passion and intelligence that is unmatched among their peers on either side of the ocean – and, in doing so, it emphasizes the Manics' uniqueness as one of the few bands of the '90s that can deliver albums as bracing intellectually as they are sonically."

Among less positive comments Entertainment Weekly gave the album a C−, concluding with: "Their best efforts, particularly the 1994 screed called Holy Bible, were triumphs of sheer will and caustic attitude. Sadly, the albums made after his [Edwards'] departure prove the Preachers were, after all, a James gang. How else to explain such treacly dreck on This Is My Truth Tell Me Yours as You Stole the Sun From My Heart and You're Tender and You're Tired. This is my truth: The album is lucky to get a C−".

=== Awards ===
The album won Best British Album, and the band Best British Group, at the 1999 BRIT Awards. The album was nominated for the 1999 Mercury Prize, but just like the previous album it failed to win the award. In the NME Awards in 1999, the band won every single big prize, Best Band, Best Album, Best Live Act, Best Single and Best Video.

"If You Tolerate This Your Children Will Be Next"
The single reached number one on the UK charts, it was widely named 'Single of the Year'

=== Accolades ===
The album was a critical success; on end-of-the-year critics lists it achieved the following accolades:

- It achieved number 14 in Kerrang! Albums of the Year 1998.
- A spot in Q Magazine's Albums of 1998.
- Placed at number 29 in Melody Maker End of Year Critic List for 1998.
- NME listed This Is My Truth Tell Me Yours as the 24th best album of 1998.
- Melody Maker also listed "If You Tolerate This Your Children Will Be Next" as the sixth best single of the year.
- NME also named "If You Tolerate This Your Children Will Be Next" the fifth best single of the year.

Reflecting on the album, Drowned in Sound in 2008 said that This Is My Truth Tell Me Yours is "sad" and is a "stately, tender lament to their past" stating that: "Just as the Holy Bible was Richey's, this is Nicky's more than anything; confused where Richey was focused, afraid of loneliness while Richey embraced it. You can't escape the idea that he almost feels guilty for what they'd turned into, and that imbues This Is My Truth, Tell Me Yours with a sadness and longing that wasn't immediately evident on its initial release."

Looking back on the catalogue of the band, Clash stated the following about the record: "Misfiring album closer and Hillsborough referencing 'S.Y.M.M.' was a rare error, brushing up against eternal favourites 'You Stole The Sun From My Heart' and 'Tsunami' and the delicate shimmer of 'Black Dog on My Shoulder', which more than make up for it. Although a little close to AOR with the preference for mid-paced melancholia, the Manics were now making grown up, actually rather beautiful music. Which, of course, couldn't last."

The album is ranked number 987 in All-Time Top 1000 Albums (3rd edition, 2000).

== Track listing ==
All lyrics are written by Nicky Wire; all music is composed by James Dean Bradfield and Sean Moore.

No.	Title	Length
1.	"The Everlasting"	6:09
2.	"If You Tolerate This Your Children Will Be Next"	4:50
3.	"You Stole the Sun from My Heart"	4:20
4.	"Ready for Drowning"	4:32
5.	"Tsunami"	3:51
6.	"My Little Empire"	4:09
7.	"I'm Not Working"	5:51
8.	"You're Tender and You're Tired"	4:37
9.	"Born a Girl"	4:12
10.	"Be Natural"	5:12
11.	"Black Dog on My Shoulder"	4:48
12.	"Nobody Loved You"	4:44
13.	"S.Y.M.M."	5:57
Total length:		63:12

Japanese bonus tracks
No.	Title	Length
14.	"Socialist Serenade"	4:12
15.	"Black Holes for the Young"	4:10
Total length:		71:34

Japanese bonus CD (2009 reissue)
No.	Title	Length
1.	"Montana/Autumn/78"	3:14
2.	"Buildings for Dead People"	5:31
3.	"The Everlasting" (Deadly Avenger's Psalm 315)	5:44
4.	"If You Tolerate This Your Children Will Be Next" (live)	4:30
5.	"You Love Us" (live)	2:51
6.	"Motorcycle Emptiness" (live)	6:04
7.	"Kevin Carter" (live)	3:13
8.	"The Everlasting" (live)	5:27
9.	"A Design for Life" (live)	4:19
10.	"Motown Junk" (live)	4:03
11.	"Small Black Flowers That Grow in the Sky" (live)	3:28
Total length:		48:24

=== 20th Anniversary Collectors' Edition ===
The first CD is the album with Nobody Loved You replaced by Prologue to History and then inserted after SYMM as a hidden and unlisted track.

CD2: Demos & Live Rehearsals
No.	Title	Length
1.	"The Everlasting" (live rehearsal demo)	5:35
2.	"If You Tolerate This Your Children Will Be Next" (Dave Bascombe mix)	4:07
3.	"You Stole the Sun from My Heart" (live rehearsal demo)	3:45
4.	"Ready for Drowning" (live rehearsal demo)	3:46
5.	"Tsunami" (studio demo)	4:09
6.	"My Little Empire" (live rehearsal demo)	3:40
7.	"I'm Not Working" (home recording demo)	4:11
8.	"You're Tender and You're Tired" (studio demo)	3:40
9.	"Born a Girl" (alternative version)	4:12
10.	"Be Natural" (live rehearsal demo)	4:19
11.	"Black Dog on My Shoulder" (live rehearsal demo)	2:28
12.	"Prologue to History" (live rehearsal demo)	3:45
13.	"S.Y.M.M." (studio demo)	5:29
14.	"Nobody Loved You" (live rehearsal demo)	4:43
Total length:		57:49

CD3: Remixes and B-Sides
No.	Title	Length
1.	"If You Tolerate This Your Children Will Be Next" (Massive Attack remix)	4:52
2.	"If You Tolerate This Your Children Will Be Next" (David Holmes remix)	10:02
3.	"The Everlasting" (Deadly Avenger's Psalm 315)	5:40
4.	"The Everlasting" (Stealth Sonic Orchestra remix)	5:11
5.	"You Stole the Sun from My Heart" (David Holmes remix)	5:13
6.	"You Stole the Sun from My Heart" (Mogwai remix)	6:13
7.	"Tsunami" (Cornelius remix)	4:05
8.	"Tsunami" (Stereolab remix)	6:44
9.	"Montana/Autumn/78"	3:15
10.	"Black Holes for the Young"	4:13
11.	"Valley Boy"	5:13
12.	"Socialist Serenade"	4:16
13.	"Buildings for Dead People"	5:33
Total length:		70:30

Bonus track for Japan
No.	Title	Length
14.	"Train in Vain" (live) (The Clash cover)

== Personnel ==
Manic Street Preachers

- James Dean Bradfield – lead vocals, lead and rhythm guitar, acoustic guitar, 12-string guitar (tracks 2, 10 and 12), electric sitar (tracks 5 and 7), Omnichord (tracks 4 and 5), melody horn (track 10)
- Sean Moore – drums, programming (tracks 1, 3 and 5)
- Nicky Wire – bass guitar, acoustic bass (tracks 6 and 11), vocals (track 6)

Additional musicians

- Nick Nasmyth – Wurlitzer electric piano (tracks 1–4, 7 and 13), Mellotron (tracks 2, 8 and 13), keyboards (tracks 5 and 7), piano (track 8), Vox Continental (track 11), accordion (track 9), yang-ching (track 7), Hammond organ (track 4)
- Martin Ditcham – percussion (tracks 1, 3–5, 7, 8 and 11)
- Andy Duncan – percussion (tracks 2, 6, 10 and 12)
- Craig Pruess – sitar (track 5), tambura (track 5)
- Ken Barry – whistling (track 8)
- Sally Herbert – string arrangements (tracks 1, 5 and 11), violin (tracks 1, 5 and 11)
- Gini Ball and Anne Stephenson – violin (tracks 1 and 11)
- Jos Pook and Claire Orsler – viola (tracks 1, 5 and 11)
- Padlock McKiernan – tin whistle (tracks 4, 7 and 13)
- Dinah Beamish – cello (tracks 1 and 6)
- Fenella Barton, Nell Catchpole, Sue Dench, Margaret Roseberry, Sonia Slany, Jules Singleton and Ann Wood – additional string section (track 11)

Technical personnel

- Mike Hedges – production on tracks 1, 3, 4, 5, 7, 8, 9, 11 and 13
- Ian Grimble – engineering and mixing on tracks 1, 3, 4, 5, 7, 8, 11 and 13
- Guy Massey – mix assistant on tracks 1, 3, 4, 5, 7, 8, 9, 11 and 13
- Greg Haver – engineering (drums) on tracks 3 and 7
- Dave Eringa – production and mixing on tracks 2, 6, 10 and 12
- Lee Butler – assistant engineer on tracks 2, 6, 10 and 12
- John Bailey – mix assistant on tracks 2, 6, 10 and 12
- Nicky Wire – design and direction, polaroids
- Farrow Design – design and direction
- Andy Earl – cover photograph
- Mitch Ikeda – polaroids

== Charts ==
=== Weekly charts ===
Weekly chart performance for This Is My Truth Tell Me Yours
Chart (1998)	Peak position
Australian Albums (ARIA)	13
Austrian Albums (Ö3 Austria)	20
Belgian Albums (Ultratop Flanders)	32
Finnish Albums (Suomen virallinen lista)	1
Danish Albums (Hitlisten)	16
Dutch Albums (Album Top 100)	24
Canadian Albums (Billboard)	45
German Albums (Offizielle Top 100)	27
Irish Albums (IRMA)	1
New Zealand Albums (RMNZ)	11
Norwegian Albums (VG-lista)	5
Scottish Albums (Official Charts)	1
Spanish Albums (Promusicae)	48
Swedish Albums (Sverigetopplistan)	1
Swiss Albums (Schweizer Hitparade)	47
UK Albums (Official Charts)	1

=== Year-end charts ===
Year-end chart performance for This Is My Truth Tell Me Yours
Chart (1998)	Position
UK Albums (OCC)	24
Chart (1999)	Position
UK Albums (OCC)	32

== Certifications ==
Certifications for This Is My Truth Tell Me Yours
Region	Certification	Certified units/sales
Finland (Musiikkituottajat)	Gold	32,153
Netherlands (NVPI)	Gold	50,000^{^}
New Zealand (RMNZ)	Gold	7,500^{^}
Norway (IFPI Norway)	Gold	25,000^{*}
Sweden (GLF)	Platinum	80,000^{^}
United Kingdom (BPI)	3× Platinum	1,051,123
Summaries
Europe (IFPI)	Platinum	1,000,000^{*}
Worldwide	—	5,000,000
^{*} Sales figures based on certification alone.^{^} Shipments figures based on certification alone.
