= Slash 'n' Burn =

Song by Manic Street Preachers

Single by Manic Street Preachers

from the album Generation Terrorists
- Released: 16 March 1992
- Genre: Glam metal; heavy metal
- Label: Columbia
- Songwriters: James Dean Bradfield, Nicky Wire, Sean Moore, Richey Edwards

Manic Street Preachers singles chronology
| "You Love Us (Sony Version)" (1992) | "Slash 'n' Burn" (1992) | "Motorcycle Emptiness" (1992) |

"Slash 'n' Burn" is a song by Welsh alternative rock band Manic Street Preachers. It was released on 16 March 1992 by record label Columbia as the fourth single from the band's debut album, Generation Terrorists (1992).

== Content ==
=== Musical style ===
The band has described the track as "the Stones playing metal", and features guitar riffs influenced by Michael Schenker and Slash of Guns N' Roses.

Emily Mackay of British cultural publication The Quietus proclaimed "Slash 'n' Burn" to be "cock-of-the-walk hair metal guitar strutting".

SputnikMusic adjudged the song "4 minutes of macho metal led by a joyously electric riff", in which "Bradfield takes perfect command of Wire and Edwards’ words".

=== Themes ===
The song's title takes its inspiration from U.S. Army policy during the Vietnam War.

== Release ==
The single was released on 16 March 1992 by record label Columbia. It reached number 20 in the UK Singles Chart on 28 March 1992. B-sides "Motown Junk" and "Sorrow 16" were previously available on the "Motown Junk" single, released by the band's previous label.

== Track listings ==
CD

| No. | Title | Length |
|---|---|---|
| 1. | "Slash 'n' Burn" | 3:59 |
| 2. | "Motown Junk" | 3:58 |
| 3. | "Sorrow 16" | 3:46 |
| 4. | "Ain't Going Down" | 3:07 |

12-inch

Side A
| No. | Title | Length |
|---|---|---|
| 1. | "Slash 'n' Burn" | 3:59 |

Side B
| No. | Title | Length |
|---|---|---|
| 1. | "Motown Junk" | 3:58 |
| 2. | "Ain't Going Down" | 3:07 |

7-inch

Side A
| No. | Title | Length |
|---|---|---|
| 1. | "Slash 'n' Burn" | 3:59 |

Side B
| No. | Title | Length |
|---|---|---|
| 1. | "Motown Junk" | 3:58 |

1997 CD

| No. | Title | Length |
|---|---|---|
| 1. | "Slash 'n' Burn" | 3:59 |
| 2. | "Sorrow 16" | 3:46 |
| 3. | "Ain't Going Down" | 3:07 |

== Charts ==
| Chart (1992) | Peak position |
|---|---|
| Europe (Eurochart Hot 100) | 84 |
| UK Singles (Official Charts) | 20 |
| UK Airplay (Music Week) | 45 |

== Release history ==
| Region | Date | Format(s) | Label(s) | Ref. |
|---|---|---|---|---|
| United Kingdom | 16 March 1992 | 7-inch vinyl; 12-inch vinyl; CD; cassette | Columbia | |
| Australia | 18 May 1992 | CD; cassette | Columbia | |
