= Tori Lyons =

Welsh actress

Tori Lyons (Victoria Amy Lyons) is an actress from South Wales.

Lyons is known for her roles in the Manic Street Preachers music videos. The first being "Show Me the Wonder", opposite Craig Roberts. It went on to win a Q Music Award for best music video. She also starred in the follow-up video "Anthem for a Lost Cause".

Lyons debuted nationally for the Amazon Fire TV campaign as the only Welsh actor.

Lyons played Jenny in the ChainWorks Productions and RCT Theatres production of Gladiator by Laurence Allan.

Her lead debut in short 'Receptive. Totally Receptive' was filmed in 2015. She also filmed experimental short 'Discordance' with the same director, Chris O'Neill in Cork. She played 'Daisy' in Atithi in London directed by Ashwni Dhir, alongside Kartik Aaryan in 2016.

Lyons was signed to Gingersnap Models in 2016. She had her first front cover in Welsh Weddings Magazine in the 'Dare to be Different' issue.

Lyons was signed by Management 2000 in 2018.

Lyons signed with BBC Sesh in 2019 as a comedy writer and performer. She is known for her political comedy often commenting on societal expectations and inequalities.

Lyons made her television lead debut in BBC Wales comedy sketch show 'Backwashed' as part of their 'Festival of Funny' in December 2021. Lyons plays the character of 'Zee'.
