= Love's Sweet Exile =

Song by Manic Street Preachers

Single by Manic Street Preachers

from the album Generation Terrorists
- B-side: "Repeat (UK)"; "Democracy Coma"; "Stay Beautiful" (live)
- Released: 28 October 1991
- Genre: Glam metal; heavy metal; progressive metal
- Label: Columbia
- Songwriters: Richey Edwards; Nicky Wire; James Dean Bradfield; Sean Moore
- Producer: Steve Brown

Manic Street Preachers singles chronology
"Stay Beautiful" (1991)	"Love's Sweet Exile" (1991)	"You Love Us (Sony Version)" (1992)

"Love's Sweet Exile" is a song by Welsh alternative rock band Manic Street Preachers. It was released on 28 October 1991 by record label Columbia as the second single from their debut album, Generation Terrorists (1992). The B-side, "Repeat (UK)", appears on the same album.

== Content ==
The track "Love's Sweet Exile" was originally called "Faceless Sense of Void". The principal difference between the two is that the original version does not have the chorus of the recorded version. The melody for the chorus was taken from another unreleased Manic Street Preachers song, "Just Can't Be Happy Without You". The band – James Dean Bradfield in particular – have said that they dislike the version recorded for Generation Terrorists.

Marc Burrows of Drowned in Sound proclaimed the song "easily the most metal Generation Terrorists gets", illustrating it to be a "trad-metal monster" embellished by "Bradfield's most over-the-top solo". Sam Shepard of MusicOHM alluded to the track's "glam metal stylings", while Martin Power drew comparisons to "the work of a prog metal band".

== Release ==
"Love's Sweet Exile" was released on 28 October 1991 by record label Columbia. The single reached number 26 in the UK Singles Chart on 9 November 1991, making it the band's highest-charting single at that point.

The CD and standard 12-inch included "Democracy Coma" (which was an album track on the U.S. version of the debut album). There was also a limited gatefold 12-inch with a bonus live version of "Stay Beautiful".

== Re-release ==
The track was re-worked and re-released as "Love's Sweet Exile (Acoustic Blue Version)" on 10 October 2011 as announced via the band's website. The song is available as a digital download from Amazon.

== Music video ==
The music video for the song directed by W.I.Z. is notable for its homoerotic imagery. Nicky Wire and Richey James Edwards are apparently naked while in close contact with each other, while Bradfield is also apparently naked, with an archery target drawn on his chest. The clip was also the first of many by the band to feature a favoured literary quote on screen. In this case, a piece of text credited to Albert Camus heralds the song; "And then came human beings. They wanted to cling, but there was nothing to cling to". The music video also features bassist Nicky Wire spray painting the word 'REPEAT' on a glass screen, referencing the single's B-side, of the same name.

== Track listings ==
All lyrics by Richey Edwards and Nicky Wire, all music by James Dean Bradfield and Sean Moore

7-inch

Side A
No.	Title	Length
1.	"Love's Sweet Exile"	3:08

Side B
No.	Title	Length
1.	"Repeat (UK)"	3:12

12-inch

Side A
No.	Title	Length
1.	"Repeat (UK)"	3:12

Side B
No.	Title	Length
1.	"Love's Sweet Exile"	3:08
2.	"Democracy Coma"	3:44

Limited edition gatefold 12-inch

Side A
No.	Title	Length
1.	"Repeat (UK)"	3:12
2.	"Democracy Coma"	3:44

Side B
No.	Title	Length
1.	"Love's Sweet Exile"	3:08
2.	"Stay Beautiful" (live)	2:52

CD

No.	Title	Length
1.	"Love's Sweet Exile"	3:08
2.	"Repeat (UK)"	3:12
3.	"Democracy Coma"	3:44

Note: CD reissued in 1997

== Charts ==
Chart (1991)	Peak position
UK Singles (OCC)	26
UK Airplay (Music Week)	30

== Release history ==
Region	Date	Format(s)	Label(s)	Ref.
United Kingdom	28 October 1991	7-inch vinyl; 12-inch vinyl; CD	Columbia	
Australia	16 March 1992	CD; cassette	Columbia	
