= Show Me the Wonder =

Song by Manic Street Preachers

Single by Manic Street Preachers

from the album Rewind the Film
- Released: 9 September 2013
- Genre: Soul pop; pop
- Length: 3:20
- Label: Columbia
- Songwriter(s): James Dean Bradfield, Nick Jones, Sean Moore
- Producer(s): Manic Street Preachers, Loz Williams

Manic Street Preachers singles chronology
"This Is the Day" (2011)	"Show Me the Wonder" (2013)	"Anthem for a Lost Cause" (2013)

"Show Me the Wonder" is a song by the Welsh alternative rock band Manic Street Preachers. It was released as the lead single from the band's eleventh studio album, Rewind the Film, on 9 September 2013.

== Critical reception ==
The song received positive reviews. Jamie Milton of This Is Fake DIY called the song "a triumphant, brass-led addition to the record." David Owens of Western Mail described the song as "a brass-infused soul pop standard recalling Dexys Midnight Runners and the heady days of Motown," while inferring that "the new album sees the band utilising a more reflective, stripped-back sound." Fact magazine wrote: "notably more buoyant than ‘Rewind The Film’, the song features some chirpy horn backing and a turn on the trumpet from Manics drummer Sean Moore." Michelle Geslani of Consequence of Sound also noted the brass section, further commenting that "the band seeks inspiration and a little awe out of life." Contactmusic.com stated that "the song is an upbeat, positive pop song but with questioning lyrics," while further elaborating that "the soaring horns and a joyous chorus makes it a stand out track on what is otherwise a delicate record."

== Notes ==
The song's lyrics appear to be at least partially derived from the Manics' 2001 single "Found That Soul," which begins with the words "Show me a wonder."

== Music video ==
The music video for the song features Craig Roberts of Skins and new actress Tori Lyons from South Wales. It was released on 29 July 2013. It features the band performing live "in an old-fashioned pub." It was filmed at the Pioneer Workingmen's Club in Porth, Rhondda Valleys in South Wales.

The video, directed Kieran Evans, won the award for 'Best Video' at the 2013 Q Awards.

== Track listing ==
UK Promo CD-R
No.	Title	Length
1.	"Show Me the Wonder"	3:20
2.	"Show Me the Wonder" (Instrumental)	3:20

Digital download
No.	Title	Length
1.	"Show Me the Wonder"	3:20
2.	"Melancholyme"	3:10
3.	"Tsunami" (live at The O2)	3:34

7" vinyl 1
No.	Title	Length
1.	"Show Me the Wonder"	3:20
2.	"T. E. Lawrence on a Bike"	3:22

7" vinyl 2
No.	Title	Length
1.	"Show Me the Wonder"	3:20
2.	"What Happened to the Blue Generation"	3:01

== Personnel ==
Manic Street Preachers

- James Dean Bradfield – lead vocals, lead and rhythm guitar
- Nicky Wire – bass guitar
- Sean Moore – drums

Other personnel

- Gavin Fitzjohn - horn arrangement, baritone and tenor saxophone, trumpet
- John Rey - piano
- Alex Silva - production
- Loz Williams - production

== Charts ==
Chart (2013)	Peak position
UK Singles Chart	77
BEL Singles Chart	82
