= Generation Terrorists =

1992 album by Manic Street Preachers

Studio album by Manic Street Preachers
- Released: 10 February 1992
- Recorded: July–December 1991
- Studios: Black Barn Studios in London, England
- Genres: Glam rock; hard rock; punk rock; glam punk; glam metal; alternative rock
- Length: 73:00
- Label: Columbia
- Producers: Steve Brown, The Bomb Squad (track 8)

Manic Street Preachers chronology
New Art Riot E.P. (1990)	Generation Terrorists (1992)	Gold Against the Soul (1993)

Singles from Generation Terrorists
- 1. "Stay Beautiful" Released: 29 July 1991; 2. "Love's Sweet Exile" Released: 28 October 1991; 3. "You Love Us" Released: 16 January 1992; 4. "Slash 'n' Burn" Released: 16 March 1992; 5. "Motorcycle Emptiness" Released: 1 June 1992; 6. "Little Baby Nothing" Released: 16 November 1992

Generation Terrorists is the debut studio album by Welsh alternative rock band Manic Street Preachers, released on 10 February 1992 by Columbia Records.

On the back of significant media attention and a "disproportionately high press profile" generated by the band's previously released single "Motown Junk" from 1991, Generation Terrorists was long-awaited by critics thanks to the members' proclamation that their debut would be the "greatest rock album ever" and sell around sixteen million copies around the world, "from Bangkok to Senegal". Recorded between July and December 1991 and released in February 1992, the album did not meet these sales figures but it was nonetheless ultimately certified Gold in the United Kingdom and also charted within the Top 100 in Japan.

== Recording ==
Generation Terrorists was recorded by tracking (the band recording each instrument separately rather than playing it as a live band and then adding the overdubs later) over a period of twenty-three weeks at Blackbarn Studios, near Guildford, England.

Producer Steve Brown decided not to use live drums on the album, and so most of the drum tracks were recorded with a drum machine, which was programmed by the band's drummer Sean Moore.

== Content ==
=== Musical style ===
Describing the album's musical style, the Quietus opined "It had to sound passé, it had to be overdone; if you're trying to bulldoze the shiny edifice of western pop culture, you can't do it tastefully or with subtlety, can you? [...] Generation Terrorists intentionally overplays its hand, overeggs its pudding and spunks its load at every turn". and Pitchfork writer Joe Tangari wrote that Generation Terrorists "walked a weird line between agit-punk, cock rock, romantic melodicism and glam, and was so obviously patterned after the Clash's London Calling that it was actually kind of cute." Critics have labelled the album as glam rock, hard rock, punk rock, glam punk and glam metal. Other influences on the album's sound include Guns N' Roses and the New York Dolls.

=== Lyrical content ===
All lyrics were written by Richey Edwards and Nicky Wire. All music was written by James Dean Bradfield and Sean Moore (except "Damn Dog", which is a cover version of a song by the Sleez Sisters from the 1980 movie Times Square). The album's lyrics are politicised similar to that of The Clash and Public Enemy, with the album's songs regularly switching from a critical focus on global capitalism to more personal tales of despair and the struggles of youth. Examples of the more politically inspired side of Generation Terrorists include the opening track "Slash 'n' Burn", which concerns "third world exploitation", the track "Repeat (Stars and Stripes)", a remix of the band's own anti-monarchy tirade by Public Enemy production team The Bomb Squad and "Another Invented Disease", a song whose title was deliberate word play on AIDS and referred to a conspiracy theory insinuating that the virus was manufactured by American biological warfare scientists.

"Motorcycle Emptiness"
"Motorcycle Emptiness", which criticizes consumerism as a "shallow dream", was released as a single

Other tracks combine personal and political themes, implicating a connection between global capitalism and personal struggle; "Nat West-Barclays-Midlands-Lloyds" was written as a critique of overseas banking credit policies, but also concerned Richey Edwards' issues involving overdrafts and refused loans. Marc Burrows of Drowned in Sound considered the song to be an accurate prediction of "global financial meltdown" and its effects on everyday life. The single "Motorcycle Emptiness", meanwhile, criticizes consumerism as a "shallow dream" that makes human life overtly commercialized. "Little Baby Nothing", a duet between Traci Lords and Bradfield, was described by Priya Elan of the NME as a "perfect snapshot of [female] innocence bodysnatched and twisted".

Wire and Edwards' love of poetry is also evident in their lyrics. Stuart Maconie of Select speculated that the album's lyrics were not primarily written for usage in song format: "You got the impression that often they haven't even been tried out in the mouth". Instead, revolutionary slogans, and rhyme-free verse conveying multiple messages combine to create an album "drenched in Richey and Nicky's cut-n-paste lyrical agitation", with vocalist Bradfield "fitting sentences along the lines of 'Nagasaki royal alienation consumer deathmask strychnine holocaust hate' into the restrictive confines of a melodic rock chorus."

=== Album cover ===
Edwards assumed responsibility for the cover; among ideas he had were using Andres Serrano's Piss Christ, a Jesus figure inside a container of urine; the Bert Stern Marilyn Monroe photographs; a sandpaper sleeve that would scratch the album itself as well as anything else that it was shelved by (similar to Mémoires by Asger Jorn and Guy Debord); as well as several other famous religious paintings; but these suggestions were either declined or found too expensive.

The final front cover of the album was a picture of Edwards' left arm and chest. The arm had a tattoo of a rose with the words "useless generation" in capitals underneath, which was changed to "generation terrorists". This was not without problems, as the original pressing had made Edwards' flesh to be bright pink as opposed to the intended mustard. The back cover featured a design similar to their earlier New Art Riot EP cover, an EC Flag, though this time it was crumpled and in flames. The working title of the album was Culture, Alienation, Boredom & Despair (a lyric from the song "Little Baby Nothing").

== Release ==
Generation Terrorists was released on 10 February 1992. The album entered the UK Rock Chart at No. 1, selling around 250,000 copies worldwide initially. These sales coincided with the 1992 BRIT Awards, whose winners relegated Generation Terrorists to a peak of No. 13 in the UK Albums Chart and has spent a total of 28 weeks in the top 100. Early pressings of the album contain a sample from A Streetcar Named Desire at the start of "Little Baby Nothing". It was removed from later pressings and does not appear on the legacy 20th anniversary edition of the album. The success of 1996's Everything Must Go at the 1997 BRIT Awards ensured that sales of Generation Terrorists and subsequent albums Gold Against the Soul and The Holy Bible enjoyed a late surge; the band's debut sold an extra 110,000 copies.

In the US, the track listing was changed, and some of the more political tracks were dropped. "Democracy Coma" was added to make up for this; it was later released as the B-side to "Love's Sweet Exile"/"Repeat", and also appeared on Lipstick Traces (A Secret History of Manic Street Preachers). In addition, four tracks on the US release ("Slash 'n' Burn", "Nat West–Barclays–Midlands–Lloyds", "Little Baby Nothing" and "You Love Us") were remixed by Michael Brauer. These same four tracks also featured live drumming from American drummer Zachary Alford. These tracks were later included on the Stars and Stripes EP in Japan.

The album failed to chart in the United States, shifting only 35,000 units. Music journalist Simon Price suggested that this was because of the arrival of bands such as Nirvana, Pearl Jam and Soundgarden as the "new rock-megastar elite".

On 5 November 2012, Generation Terrorists was re-released for its 20th anniversary. There are five editions of the re-release: the original album; a two-disc Deluxe Edition with a bonus disc of demos and a DVD of the documentary film Culture, Alienation, Boredom, Despair, about the making of the album – when purchased from the Rough Trade record store in London it also included a free ticket to a showing of the documentary film, followed by an acoustic gig with James Dean Bradfield on 6 November; a four-disc limited edition (3,000 copies worldwide), including, in addition to the contents of the two-disc edition, a replica of a Generation Terrorist tour VIP pass; a 10" collage by Richey Edwards; a 10" vinyl LP of a rare Manics radio performance; and a 28-page book from Nicky Wire's personal archive.

== Reception ==
Professional ratings
Review scores
Source	Rating
AllMusic	4/5 stars
Alternative Press	4/5 stars
BBC	favourable
Clash	8/10
Drowned in Sound	8/10
The Guardian	4/5 stars
The Independent	4/5 stars
NME	10/10
Q	4/5 stars
The Quietus	favourable

Soon after its release Generation Terrorists was greeted with a favourable reception from magazines such as Kerrang! and RAW, along with a number 15 placing in the NME Albums of the Year list for 1992. Andy Gill, music critic for The Independent, highlighted in a review of the album's 2012 reissue that the music was "derided as sub-Clash" in other contemporary appraisals, but remarked that it "now has an astringent edge". The album's length and lack of "quality control" were common criticisms. Richey Edwards said that "everybody knows the first album would have been better if we'd left out all the crap." The underproduction of the album was a common cause of complaint among the band's adherents until the superior mix of the Anniversary Edition in 2012.

Nevertheless, by 2012 critics' perception of Generation Terrorists had remained generally positive. In their retrospective review of the album, The Quietus wrote, "Generation Terrorists should be celebrated, because among its messy feast of ideas it remembers to be fun. There's a cleansing and creative glee in its righteous rage and cultural destruction that's rarer in Gold Against the Soul and The Holy Bible." AllMusic wrote, "Since the Manics deliver these charged lyrics as heavy guitar-rockers, the music doesn't always hit quite as forcefully as intended", stating that the "relatively polished production and big guitar sound occasionally sell the music short, especially the lesser songs", but calling the band's passion "undeniable, even on the weaker cuts [...] Debut albums rarely come as ambitious as the Manic Street Preachers' Generation Terrorists."

NME listed Generation Terrorists as the 18th greatest debut album from the last 50 years, describing the record as "angry as it was bright, the Manics blowtorched their manifesto in pulverising punk guitar squeals." In a 2012 "In Depth" feature, Dom Gourlay of Drowned in Sound declared Generation Terrorists to be the most important debut of the 1990s. In a February 2011 issue of Q it was voted by readers at #77 in "The 250 Best Albums of Q's Lifetime" featuring albums between 1986 and 2011. The same magazine gave the record the award for Classic album in the Q Awards in 2012.

== 35th anniversary show ==
On 18 November 2026, it was announced on the band's official website and social media platforms that they would be performing the album in full for the first time at a one-off show in Blackweir Fields, Cardiff on 19 June 2027, with special guests the Libertines, the Cardigans, and the Tubs, plus a DJ set by Elis James.

== Track listing ==
All lyrics are written by Richey Edwards and Nicky Wire; all music is composed by James Dean Bradfield and Sean Moore, except "Damn Dog", by Jacob Brackman and Billy Mernit.

No.	Title	Length
1.	"Slash 'n' Burn"	4:00
2.	"Nat West–Barclays–Midlands–Lloyds"	4:32
3.	"Born to End"	3:55
4.	"Motorcycle Emptiness"	6:08
5.	"You Love Us"	4:18
6.	"Love's Sweet Exile"	3:29
7.	"Little Baby Nothing" (5:22 on early pressings)	5:00
8.	"Repeat (Stars and Stripes)"	4:09
9.	"Tennessee"	3:06
10.	"Another Invented Disease"	3:24
11.	"Stay Beautiful"	3:10
12.	"So Dead"	4:28
13.	"Repeat (UK)"	3:08
14.	"Spectators of Suicide"	4:40
15.	"Damn Dog"	1:52
16.	"Crucifix Kiss"	3:39
17.	"Methadone Pretty"	3:56
18.	"Condemned to Rock 'n' Roll"	6:06
Total length:		73:00

Japan bonus track
No.	Title	Length
19.	"A Vision of Dead Desire"	3:14
Total length:		76:14

Japan 1998 reissue bonus track
No.	Title	Length
19.	"Motown Junk"	3:58
Total length:		76:58

US track listing
No.	Title	Length
1.	"Slash 'n' Burn"	4:00
2.	"Nat West–Barclays–Midlands–Lloyds"	4:32
3.	"Love's Sweet Exile"	3:29
4.	"Little Baby Nothing"	5:00
5.	"Another Invented Disease"	3:24
6.	"Stay Beautiful"	3:10
7.	"Repeat (UK)"	3:09
8.	"You Love Us"	4:18
9.	"Democracy Coma"	3:44
10.	"Crucifix Kiss"	3:39
11.	"Motorcycle Emptiness"	6:08
12.	"Tennessee"	3:06
13.	"Repeat (Stars and Stripes)"	4:08
14.	"Condemned to Rock 'n' Roll"	6:06
Total length:		57:53

20th Anniversary Legacy Edition bonus track
No.	Title	Lyrics	Music	Length
19.	"Theme from M*A*S*H (Suicide Is Painless)"	Mike Altman	Johnny Mandel	3:44
Total length:				76:44

20th Anniversary Legacy Edition bonus disc
No.	Title	Length
1.	"Slash 'n' Burn" (House in the Woods demo)	3:59
2.	"Nat West–Barclays–Midlands–Lloyds" (Marcus demo)	4:02
3.	"Born to End" (Marcus demo)	2:55
4.	"Motorcycle Emptiness" (House in the Woods demo)	6:26
5.	"You Love Us" (Heavenly version)	4:26
6.	"Love's Sweet Exile" (House in the Woods demo)	3:15
7.	"Little Baby Nothing" (House in the Woods demo)	4:25
8.	"Repeat" (Marcus demo)	2:42
9.	"Tennessee" (House in the Woods demo)	2:56
10.	"Another Invented Disease" (House in the Woods demo)	3:32
11.	"Stay Beautiful" (Marcus demo)	3:14
12.	"So Dead" (House in the Woods demo)	4:24
13.	"Repeat" (House in the Woods demo)	3:11
14.	"Spectators of Suicide" (House in the Woods demo)	5:50
15.	"Damn Dog" (live)	1:48
16.	"Crucifix Kiss" (Marcus demo)	3:42
17.	"Methadone Pretty" (House in the Woods demo)	4:12
18.	"Suicide Alley" (South Wales demo)	2:35
19.	"New Art Riot" (South Wales demo)	2:55
20.	"Motown Junk" (London studio demo)	2:53
21.	"Motown Junk"	4:00
Total length:		57:53

20th Anniversary Legacy Edition DVD
No.	Title	Length
1.	"Culture, Alienation, Boredom and Despair" (a film about Generation Terrorists)
2.	"Unseen super eight montage"
3.	"Home road movie"
4.	"Motown Junk" (video)
5.	"You Love Us" (Heavenly version) (video)
6.	"Stay Beautiful" (video)
7.	"Loves [sic] Sweet Exile" (video)
8.	"You Love Us" (Columbia version) (video)
9.	"Slash 'n' Burn" (video)
10.	"Motorcycle Emptiness" (video)
11.	"Theme from M*A*S*H (Suicide Is Painless)" (video)
12.	"Little Baby Nothing" (video)
13.	"Repeat" (video)
14.	"Nat West–Barclays–Midlands–Lloyds" (video)
15.	"Snub" (Generation Terrorists at the BBC)
16.	"Rapido" (Generation Terrorists at the BBC)
17.	"Band Explosion" (Generation Terrorists at the BBC)
18.	"Rapido" (Generation Terrorists at the BBC)
19.	"You Love Us" (Top of the Pops)
20.	"Motorcycle Emptiness" (Top of the Pops)
21.	"Theme from M*A*S*H (Suicide Is Painless)" (Top of the Pops)

20th Anniversary Collector's Edition CD3 - Remastered B-Sides & Rarities
No.	Title	Length
1.	"Motorcycle Emptiness" (South Wales demo)
2.	"Generation Terrorists" (South Wales demo)
3.	"Poleaxed" (South Wales demo)
4.	"Faceless Sense of Void" (London demo)
5.	"UK Channel Boredom" (flexi disc)
6.	"Colt 45" (South Wales demo)
7.	"Crucifix Kiss" (House in the Woods demo)
8.	"Natwest-Barclays-Midlands-Lloyds" (House in the Woods demo)
9.	"Spent All Summer" (South Wales demo remastered)
10.	"Behave Yourself Baby" (home demo remastered)
11.	"Sorrow 16" (B-side to "Motown Junk")
12.	"We Her Majesty's Prisoners" (B-side to "Motown Junk")
13.	"Spectators of Suicide" (B-side to "You Love Us" (Heavenly version))
14.	"Starlover" (B-side to "You Love Us" (Heavenly version))
15.	"R.P. Murphy" (B-side to "Stay Beautiful")
16.	"Soul Contamination" (B-side to "Stay Beautiful")
17.	"A Vision of Dead Desire" (B-side to "You Love Us" (re-recorded version))
18.	"Ain't Going Down" (B-side to "Slash 'n' Burn")
19.	"Bored Out of My Mind" (B-side to "Motorcycle Emptiness")
20.	"Never Want Again" (B-side to "Little Baby Nothing")
21.	"Dead Yankee Drawl" (B-side to "Little Baby Nothing")
22.	"Democracy Coma" (B-side to "Love's Sweet Exile")

20th Anniversary Collector's Edition 10" - BBC Radio 1 Rock Show Live Session
No.	Title	Length
1.	"You Love Us" (live)
2.	"Under My Wheels" (live)
3.	"Slash 'n' Burn" (live)
4.	"Nat West-Barclays-Midlands-Lloyds" (live)

== Personnel ==
Manic Street Preachers

- James Dean Bradfield – lead vocals, lead, rhythm, acoustic guitars
- Richey Edwards (credited as Richey James) – rhythm guitar (credited but does not perform)
- Nicky Wire – bass guitar, spoken word on "Crucifix Kiss"
- Sean Moore – drum programming, drums, percussion, backing vocals

Additional musicians

- Dave Eringa – piano, organ on "Nat West–Barclays–Midlands–Lloyds", "You Love Us", "Spectators of Suicide" and "Crucifix Kiss"
- Richard Cottle – keyboards on "Motorcycle Emptiness"
- Traci Lords – co-lead vocals on "Little Baby Nothing"
- Spike Edney – keyboards on "Little Baby Nothing"
- May McKenna – backing vocals on "Another Invented Disease"
- Jackie Challenor – backing vocals on "Another Invented Disease"
- Lorenza Johnson – backing vocals on "Another Invented Disease"
- Patrick Jones - spoken word on "Love's Sweet Exile"
- Zachary Alford – drums on "Slash N' Burn", "Nat West-Barclays-Midlands-Lloyds", "You Love Us" and "Little Baby Nothing" (US mix only)

Technical personnel

- Steve Brown – production, engineering, mixing
- Matt Ollivier – engineering
- Owen Davies – mixing
- Marc Williams – mixing assistance
- Nicholas Sansano – remixing on "Repeat (Stars and Stripes)"
- Frank Rivaleau – remixing on "Repeat (Stars and Stripes)"
- Dan Wood – remixing on "Repeat (Stars and Stripes)"
- Tom Sheehan – photography
- Valerie Phillips – photography
- Paul Slattery – photography
- Steve Guillick – photography
- Ed Sirrs – photography
- Paul Cox – photography

== Charts and certifications ==
=== Weekly charts ===
Chart (1992)	Peak position
Australian Albums (ARIA)	182
European Albums (Eurotipsheet)	45
Japanese Albums (Oricon)	60
UK Albums (Official Charts)	13

Chart (2012)	Peak position
UK Albums (Official Charts)	48

Chart (2025)	Peak position
Scottish Albums (Official Charts)	13

=== Certifications ===
Region	Certification	Certified units/sales
United Kingdom (BPI)	Gold	100,000^{^}
^{^} Shipments figures based on certification alone.
