= Dick Carruthers =

English music video and film director, based in London, England

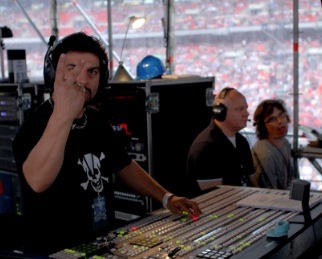
- Dick Carruthers
- Occupation: Music video director
- Years active: 1990s–present
- Website: www.cinefromage.com

Dick Carruthers (born 25 March 1966, Sussex, England) is a Grammy Award Winning, English music video and film director, based in London, England. He directed the Led Zeppelin Celebration Day film and The Rolling Stones Bridges To Babylon DVD (as live concert director) as well as many other live music videos. Carruthers' work on the Oasis Definitely Maybe DVD was nominated for two BAFTAs.

== Education ==
Carruthers attended Winchester University (then known as King Alfred's College) where he completed a BA (Hons) degree in Drama Theatre and Television Studies.

== Career ==
Before success in the music and film industries, Carruthers worked in corporate videos and in the conference and events industries. He began his directing career in the music business touring with English pop group Take That in 1993. He also toured with Jamiroquai, Texas, and Oasis. In 1996 he directed the visuals and filmed the Oasis Knebworth shows and in 1997 he was invited aboard the Rolling Stones’ Bridges To Babylon World Tour. In 2002 he joined forces with Anouk Fontaine at Metropolis Studios in London England working as M: Productions. Cheese Film Video Ltd. was incorporated in 2005.

=== Work with Led Zeppelin ===
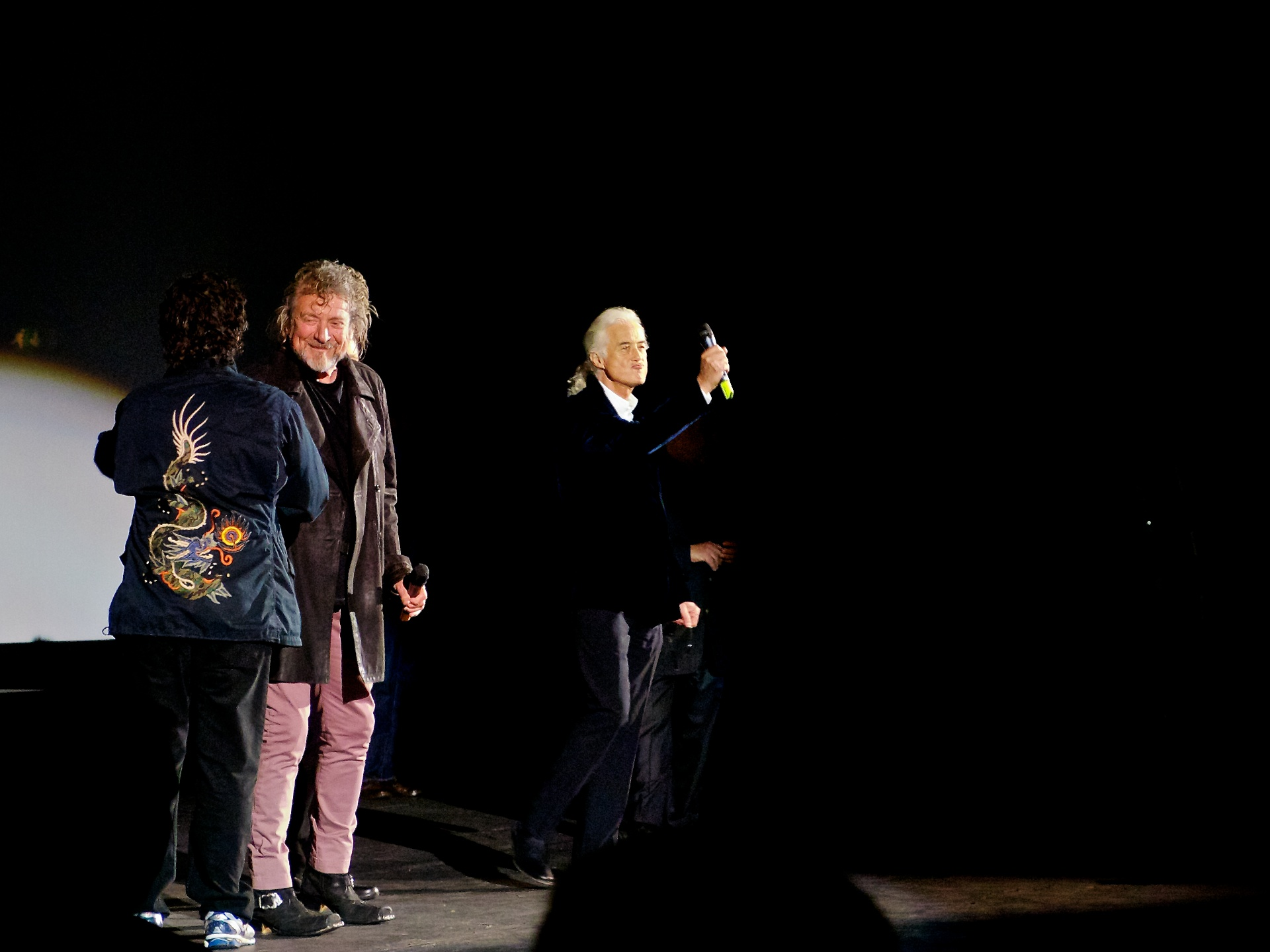
Led Zeppelin being welcomed to the stage by Dick Carruthers to talk to press about the film Celebration Day at its premiere at the Hammersmith Apollo in London

Carruthers was introduced to Jimmy Page following the acclaim of The Who Live at the Royal Albert Hall (2000). Page wanted to sort through unseen footage of Led Zeppelin in its prime and spent a year and a half with Carruthers making the retrospective double-disc Led Zeppelin DVD with vintage footage from concerts filmed in London, Paris, New York and elsewhere. The release won numerous awards, was nominated for a BAFTA and remains one of the best selling music DVDs of all time. Carruthers continued his association with Led Zeppelin as the creative director on the Warner Home video Special Edition release of The Song Remains the Same (recorded during three nights of concerts at New York’s Madison Square Garden, on the band’s 1973 concert tour of the US), adding feature extras, cuts of new songs, and surround sound.

When the band agreed to the O2 reunion (2007), a benefit for the Ahmet Ertegün Education Fund, Carruthers was hired to direct the filming. The resulting film Celebration Day was released to worldwide acclaim on 17 October 2012 (UK).

=== Work with Oasis ===
Carruthers first worked with the British rock band Oasis on their Earls Court shows in 1995, and the Maine Road shows in 1996, later released as ...There and Then (1996). In 2000 as director on the documentary Familiar to Millions (recorded at Wembley Stadium on 21 July 2000), as well as Standing On The Edge Of The Noise (Channel 4), Live At Union Chapel (Channel 4), and Glasgow Barowlands (Sky TV). To mark the tenth anniversary of its original release Carruthers also directed Definitely Maybe released on DVD in September 2004.

Carruthers later worked with the band's guitarist, songwriter Noel Gallagher on his Noel Gallagher's High Flying Birds debut album documentary DVD.

=== Documentaries and live concerts ===
Other documentaries and live concerts include Sarah Brightman - Dreamchaser in Concert (2013), Don't Believe the Truth - Live In Manchester (2005), 10 Years Of Noise and Confusion (shot at Glasgow Barrowlands), the rockumentary film Lord Don't Slow Me Down (2007), Standing on the Edge of the Noise (2008), a Josh Groban (2015) PBS TV special, and an Imagine Dragons (2016) live DVD filmed at The Air Canada Centre, Toronto, Ontario, Canada.

=== Work with Julian Lennon ===
In 2012 Carruthers worked with Julian Lennon on the feature length video documentary Through The Picture Window which followed Lennon's journey in the making of his album Everything Changes and includes interviews with Steven Tyler, Bono and Paul Buchanan from The Blue Nile. Through The Picture Window was also released as an app in all formats with bespoke videos for all 14 tracks from the album.

=== Work with The Script ===
In 2011 Carruthers directed The Script's DVD Homecoming: Live at the Aviva Stadium, Dublin, which was part of the Irish group's Science & Faith Tour and was their biggest headline show to date (50,000 people).

=== Work with Aerosmith ===
In 2014 the Aerosmith Rocks Donington DVD was released directed by Carruthers. The film captures the group headlining the massive Download Festival at Donington Park as they deliver a set of their greatest hits.

== Awards ==
- The Who Live at the Royal Albert Hall was nominated for Best DVD at the 2000 NME Awards.
- Led Zeppelin DVD (2003) BAFTA nomination, New York Awards, Best DVD (2003 CADS)
- White Stripes: Under Blackpool Lights was nominated for Best DVD (2004 CADS).
- Oasis' Definitely Maybe DVD (2004) was nominated for two BAFTAs.
- Take That - Best DVD 2006 (CADS)
- Celebration Day won best music DVD at the Classic Rock Awards, and Best Live Coverage (for Dick Carruthers) at the UKMVA 2013.

== Selected music video credits (as director) ==
- Oasis: Familiar to Millions
- Alicia Keys: Live From NYC
- Britney Spears: Live In London
- Elite Model Look
- Noel Gallagher: Sitting Here In Silence
- Oasis: Standing on the Edge of the Noise
- iTunes Festival
- Charlie Winston: Live Au Zenith de Paris
- Keane: Live at ULU
- Oasis: 10 Years of Noise & Confusion
- Michael Bublé Meets Madison Square Garden
- Aerosmith: Millenium Show (Roar of the Dragon)
- Bands Reunited: ABC
- Stereophonics: Live At Reading
- NME: The Big Gig
- Oasis: Don't Believe The Truth : Live In Manchester
- Beyoncé: I Am... World Tour
- The Killers: Live from the Royal Albert Hall
- Led Zeppelin: Led Zeppelin DVD
- The White Stripes: Under Blackpool Lights
- The Who: The Who Live at the Royal Albert Hall
- Portishead: Roseland NYC Live
- Paul McCartney: The McCartney Years
- Noel Gallagher's High Flying Birds: album DVD
- The Script: Homecoming
- Usher: OMG Tour
- Led Zeppelin: Celebration Day
- McFly: The Wonderland Tour 2005
- Kaiser Chiefs: Enjoyment
- Moloko: 11,000 Clicks
- Oasis: …There and Then
- Take That: The Ultimate Tour
- Oasis : Definitely Maybe
- Led Zeppelin : The Song Remains the Same
- Snow Patrol: Live at Somerset House
- Louise Attaque : Y-a t’il Quelqu’un ici?
- Van Morrison: Live at Montreux 1980/1974
- The Rolling Stones Bridges to Babylon Tour
- Bryan Adams: Live in Lisbon
- Elton John: Dream Ticket
- Aerosmith: Rockin' the Joint
- Texas: Paris
- Keane: Live
- Thin Lizzy: Live and Dangerous
- James: Getting Away With It... Live
- Manic Street Preachers: Everything Live
- Dire Straits: Alchemy Live
- Take That: Hometown
- Oasis: Lord Don't Slow Me Down
- Stereophonics: A Day at the Races
- Charlie Winston: Hit The Road
- Blur At Mile End
- Oasis: Time Flies... 1994–2009
- Julian Lennon: Everything Changes
- Aerosmith Rocks Donington
- Imagine Dragons: Smoke + Mirrors Live
- Mumford & Sons: Delta
