= Lust for Life =

Lust for Life may refer to:

== Film ==
- Lust for Life (1956 film), a film based on the novel, starring Kirk Douglas
- Lust for Life (1922 film), a German silent romantic comedy film

== Literature ==
- Lust for Life (novel), a 1934 biographical novel about Vincent Van Gogh by Irving Stone

== Music ==
- Lust for Life (Iggy Pop album), 1977
  - "Lust for Life" (Iggy Pop song), 1977
- Lust for Life (Lana Del Rey album), 2017
  - "Lust for Life" (Lana Del Rey song), 2017
- "Lust for Life" (Girls song), 2009
- "Lust for Life", a 1990 song by Gamma Ray from Heading for Tomorrow
- "Lust for Life", a 2009 song by Drake from So Far Gone
- "Lust for Life", a 2004 song by Heavenly from Dust to Dust

== See also ==
- LFL (disambiguation)
