= LFL =

LFL may refer to:

- Learning for Life, a United States school and work-site based youth program
- Extreme Football League, originally known as the Lingerie Football League (LFL), a women's 7-on-7 American tackle football league
- Libertarians for Life, a nonsectarian group expressing an opposition to abortion within the context of libertarianism
- Like for like, a measure of growth in sales, adjusted for new or divested businesses
- Lower flammable limit, the lower end of the concentration range over which a flammable mixture of gas or vapour in air can be ignited
- Lycée Français de Lomé, a French international school in Nyekonakpoé, Lomé, Togo
