= Anthem for a Lost Cause =

Song by Manic Street Preachers

Single by Manic Street Preachers

from the album Rewind the Film
- Released: 25 November 2013
- Genre: Alternative rock, folk rock
- Length: 3:52
- Label: Columbia
- Songwriter(s): James Dean Bradfield, Nick Jones, Sean Moore
- Producer(s): Manic Street Preachers, Loz Williams

Manic Street Preachers singles chronology
"Show Me the Wonder" (2013)	"Anthem for a Lost Cause" (2013)	"Walk Me to the Bridge" (2014)

"Anthem for a Lost Cause" is a song by Welsh alternative rock band Manic Street Preachers. It is the second single released from the band's eleventh studio album, Rewind the Film.

== Background ==
Both song and lyrics were written by singer James Dean Bradfield. In an interview, Bradfield stated that the song was about the question of if lyrics today are as important as they were before.

The music video features Tori Lyons, who previously starred in the video for "Show Me the Wonder", reprising her role as a miner's wife in the 1984 miners' strike. The band stated that Kieran Evans was important for this video as they wanted to capture the feeling of the 80s and how women dealt with the strike. In the video, we see a woman that is trying to survive without her husband.

== Release ==
The song was made available by digital download on 25 November 2013, backed up by two songs Death of a Digital Ghost and See It Like Sutherland. A live version of She Is Suffering at the O_{2} Arena in 2011 was also in the single digital download. It peaked on number 200 in the UK Singles Chart.

== Track listing ==
No.	Title	Length
1.	"Anthem for a Lost Cause"	3:52
2.	"Death of a Digital Ghost"	3:33
3.	"See It Like Sutherland"	3:56
4.	"She Is Suffering" (live at The O2)	5:01

== Personnel ==
Manic Street Preachers

- James Dean Bradfield – lead vocals, guitar
- Nicky Wire – bass guitar
- Sean Moore – drums

Other personnel

- Loz Williams - production, keyboards
- Gavin Fitzjohn - horn arrangement, trumpets
- Sean Read - horn arrangement, trumpets

== Charts ==
Chart (2013)	Peak position
UK Singles Chart	200
