= Tsunami (Manic Street Preachers song) =

1999 single by Manic Street Preachers

Single by Manic Street Preachers

from the album This Is My Truth Tell Me Yours
- B-side: "Buildings for Dead People"; "Motown Junk (Medley)" (live)
- Released: 5 July 1999
- Length: 3:51
- Label: Epic
- Composers: James Dean Bradfield; Sean Moore
- Lyricist: Nick Jones
- Producer: Mike Hedges

Manic Street Preachers singles chronology
"You Stole the Sun from My Heart" (1999)	"Tsunami" (1999)	"The Masses Against the Classes" (2000)

"Tsunami" is a song by Welsh rock band Manic Street Preachers, released as a single on 5 July 1999 through Epic Records. It was the fourth and final single released from their fifth studio album, This Is My Truth Tell Me Yours (1998). All three members of the band—James Dean Bradfield, Sean Moore and Nicky Wire—share the writing credits. The single peaked at number 11 on the UK Singles Chart.

== Background ==
"Tsunami" is the Japanese word for "big wave". The song was inspired by The Silent Twins, June and Jennifer Gibbons, who gave up speaking when they were young, became involved in crime and ended up being sent to Broadmoor Hospital. The song is unique in the band's catalogue in that it is largely built around an electric sitar and strings.

== Release ==
The single peaked at number 11 in the United Kingdom, remaining on the UK Singles Chart for eight weeks. Of all four singles from This Is My Truth Tell Me Yours, "Tsunami" spent the fewest weeks on the chart. In Finland, the song peaked in number 13, spending three weeks on Finnish Singles Chart.

The B-side "Buildings for Dead People" appears on the enhanced CD 1 along with the video for "A Design for Life". CD 2 includes a remix of "Tsunami" by Cornelius and a mix by Electron Ray Tube. The cassette version includes a live recording of "Motown Junk" from the Tivoli in Utrecht in Holland on 29 March 1999. "Tsunami" was also included on the band's Forever Delayed singles compilation.

== Track listing ==
All music was composed by James Dean Bradfield and Sean Moore except where indicated. All were lyrics written by Nick Jones except where indicated.

UK CD1

1. "Tsunami" – 3:50
2. "Buildings for Dead People" – 5:29
3. "A Design for Life" (video version) – 4:20

UK CD2

1. "Tsunami" – 3:50
2. "Tsunami" (Cornelius remix) – 4:04
3. "Tsunami" (Electron Ray Tube mix) – 6:43

UK cassette single

1. "Tsunami" – 3:50
2. "Motown Junk (Medley)" (live at Muziekcentrum Vredenburg in Utrecht, Netherlands, on 29 March 1999) (lyrics: Richey James, Jones) – 4:02

== Personnel ==
Manic Street Preachers

- James Dean Bradfield – lead vocals, guitar, electric sitar, Omnichord
- Sean Moore – drums
- Nicky Wire – bass guitar

Additional musicians

- Nick Nasmyth – keyboards
- Martin Ditcham – percussion
- Craig Pruess – sitar, tambura
- Sally Herbert – string arrangement, violin
- Jos Pook – viola
- Claire Orsler – viola

Production

- Mike Hedges – production
- Ian Grimble – engineering and mixing
- Guy Massey – mix assistant

== Charts ==
Weekly chart performance for "Tsunami"
Chart (1999)	Peak position
Europe (Eurochart Hot 100)	39
Finland (Suomen virallinen lista)	13
Ireland (IRMA)	24
Scottish Singles Sales (Official Charts)	12
UK Singles (Official Charts)	11
