= Simon Price =

Welsh music journalist and author (born 1967)

- Born: 25 September 1967 (age 59); Barry, Wales
- Occupations: Music journalist; author
- Writing career
- Period: 1986–present

Simon Price (born 25 September 1967) is a Welsh music journalist and author. He is known for his weekly review section in The Independent on Sunday and his books Everything (A Book About Manic Street Preachers) and Curepedia: An A-Z of the Cure. He was a staff writer for Melody Maker for nine years and was involved in the Romo scene of the mid-1990s.

== Career ==
=== Writer ===
Price began his career on the Barry & District News, where he wrote a music column from 1984 to 1986.

In the 1990s, Price was a staff writer for Melody Maker for nine years.

From 2000 to 2013, Price wrote weekly music reviews in The Independent on Sunday newspaper.

Everything, a biography of Manic Street Preachers, was claimed by Caroline Sullivan in The Guardian in 1999 to be the "fastest-selling rock book of all time". It was later listed by The Guardian in a Top Ten of books about rock. Ben Myers, who wrote Richard, a novel about Manics guitarist Richey Edwards, called it "one of the most exhaustively researched and passionately written band biographies in existence". Price disowned a 2002 re-issue of the book following a dispute over edits by the publisher, who cut criticisms of the police search for Richey Edwards.

Price won the Record of the Day Live Reviews: Writer of the Year awards in 2010, 2011 and 2012.

In 2023, he published Curepedia: An A-Z of the Cure which was named as a music book of the year by The Guardian.

=== DJ and club promoter ===
Price was heavily involved with the short-lived Romo scene in the mid- to late 1990s. He wrote about it extensively for Melody Maker, co-promoted the Arcadia club night and acted as DJ and tour manager for the Fiddling While Romo Burns Romo package tour.

In 2001, he co-created alternative "glam/rock/trash" club night Stay Beautiful. Named after the Manic Street Preachers song, it drew heavily on the band's ethos and attitudes. Having run for over 10 years in London, the club relocated in 2011 to Brighton, where it continued until 2016.

Since 2017, Price has run an alternative 1980s club called Spellbound in Brighton.

=== Other ===
Price has appeared on BBC radio and television stations as a pop expert.

He is a recurring contributor to the "Chart Music" podcast, revisiting classic Top of the Pops episodes.

== Personal life ==
The son of a radio presenter, Price attended Barry Comprehensive in Wales and studied French and philosophy at University College London.

Alongside 54 other signatories, Price put his name to an open letter published in The Guardian on 15 September 2010, stating their opposition to Pope Benedict XVI's state visit to the UK. He is also listed as a distinguished supporter of Humanists UK.
