= You Stole the Sun from My Heart =

1999 single by Manic Street Preachers

Single by Manic Street Preachers

from the album This Is My Truth Tell Me Yours
- B-side: "Socialist Serenade"; "Train in Vain" (live)
- Released: 8 March 1999
- Studio: Chateau de la Rouge Motte (Domfront en Poiraie, France)
- Genre: Rock
- Length: 4:20
- Label: Epic
- Composers: James Dean Bradfield; Sean Moore
- Lyricist: Nick Jones
- Producer: Mike Hedges

Manic Street Preachers singles chronology
"The Everlasting" (1998)	"You Stole the Sun from My Heart" (1999)	"Tsunami" (1999)

Official Video
- "You Stole the Sun from My Heart" on YouTube

"You Stole the Sun from My Heart" is a song by Welsh rock band Manic Street Preachers, released on 8 March 1999 as the third single from their fifth studio album, This Is My Truth Tell Me Yours (1998). All three members of the band—James Dean Bradfield, Sean Moore and Nicky Wire—share the writing credits. The song reached number five on the UK Singles Chart.

== Background and content ==
Wire has described the music as a mix of New Order and Nirvana: "something you might be able to go along with if you really do the audio equivalent of squinting – and explained that the drum loop (yes, more drum machines) was sampled by Moore from the sound of a pinball machine, of all things". In allusion to the sound of "You Stole the Sun from My Heart", Marc Burrows of Drowned In Sound proclaimed it "the most straightforward rocker here" and "catchy to the point of irritating".

The lyric concerns Nicky Wire's dislike of touring. He has said that, much as he enjoys being on stage, he hates the routine of travelling: soundchecks, hotels, and the homesickness it causes. The lyric "but there's no, no real truce with my fury" is a reference to a poetry book by R. S. Thomas entitled No Truce with the Furies. The song title is namechecked in a later Manic Street Preachers single, "Your Love Alone Is Not Enough". It was included on the 2002 compilation Forever Delayed.

== Release ==
CD one contains a live version of the Clash's "Train in Vain" and the B-side "Socialist Serenade". The single was released on 8 March 1999 in the United Kingdom and reached number five on the UK Singles Chart, spending 12 weeks in the top 100. In Australia, "You Stole the Sun from My Heart" spent one week on the ARIA Singles Chart in April 1999, peaking at number 97. The single also peaked at number two in Iceland, number 20 in Ireland, and number 94 in the Netherlands, achieving a peak of number 24 on the Eurochart Hot 100. At the 2000 Brit Awards, "You Stole the Sun from My Heart" was nominated for Best British Single but failed to win the prize.

== Music video ==
The video presents a dark/light contrast where the band plays in a room in front of a huge ornate feature window. Outside the weather rapidly alternates between stormy and sunny. Rabbits and animated birds also make an appearance.

== Track listings ==
All music was written by James Dean Bradfield and Sean Moore except where indicated. All lyrics were written by Nick Jones except where indicated.

UK CD1

1. "You Stole the Sun from My Heart" – 4:20
2. "Socialist Serenade" – 4:12
3. "Train in Vain" (live at the Newcastle Arena, 14 December 1998) (music and lyrics: Joe Strummer, Mick Jones) – 3:14

UK CD2

1. "You Stole the Sun from My Heart" – 4:20
2. "You Stole the Sun from My Heart" (David Holmes' A Joyful Racket Remix) – 5:12
3. "You Stole the Sun from My Heart" (Mogwai Remix) – 6:09

UK cassette single

1. "You Stole the Sun from My Heart" – 4:20
2. "If You Tolerate This Your Children Will Be Next" (live at Cardiff International Arena, 21 December 1998) – 4:48

== Credits and personnel ==
Credits are lifted from the This Is My Truth Tell Me Yours album booklet.

Studios

- Recorded at Chateau de la Rouge Motte (Domfront en Poiraie, France)
- Drums recorded and engineered at Big Noise Recorders (Cardiff, Wales)
- Mixed at Abbey Road (London, England)

Personnel

- James Dean Bradfield – music, vocals, electric guitar
- Sean Moore – music, drums, programming
- Nicky Wire – lyrics (as Nick Jones), bass
- Nick Nasmyth – Wurlitzer
- Martin Ditcham – percussion
- Mike Hedges – production
- Greg Haver – recording and engineering (drums)
- Ian Grimble – mixing, engineering
- Guy Massey – mixing assistance

== Charts ==
=== Weekly charts ===
Chart (1999)	Peak position
Australia (ARIA)	97
Europe (Eurochart Hot 100)	24
Iceland (Íslenski Listinn Topp 40)	2
Ireland (IRMA)	20
Netherlands (Single Top 100)	94
Scottish Singles Sales (Official Charts)	5
UK Singles (Official Charts)	5

=== Year-end charts ===
Chart (1999)	Position
UK Singles (OCC)	148
UK Airplay (Music Week)	48

== Certifications ==
Region	Certification	Certified units/sales
United Kingdom (BPI)	Silver	200,000^{‡}
^{‡} Sales+streaming figures based on certification alone.

== Release history ==
Region	Date	Format(s)	Label(s)	Ref.
United Kingdom	8 March 1999	CD; cassette	Epic	
Japan	7 April 1999	CD	Epic	
United States	9 November 1999	Alternative radio	Virgin	
