= Motorcycle Emptiness =

1992 single by Manic Street Preachers

Single by Manic Street Preachers

from the album Generation Terrorists
- Released: 1 June 1992
- Genre: Alternative rock; soft rock; glam metal
- Length: 6:09 (album version); 5:06 (edit); 3:35 (short edit)
- Label: Columbia
- Songwriters: James Dean Bradfield, Nicky Wire, Sean Moore, Richey Edwards
- Producer: Steve Brown

Manic Street Preachers singles chronology
"Slash 'n' Burn" (1992)	"Motorcycle Emptiness" (1992)	"Theme from M.A.S.H. (Suicide Is Painless)" (1992)

Audio sample
- file; help

Music video
- "Motorcycle Emptiness" on YouTube

"Motorcycle Emptiness" is a song by Welsh alternative rock band Manic Street Preachers. It was released on 1 June 1992 through Columbia Records. It was the fifth single to be released from their debut album, Generation Terrorists (1992). The song reached number 17 on the UK Singles Chart on 13 June 1992.

== Meaning ==
The track is inspired by S.E. Hinton's book Rumble Fish, about biker gang culture. According to the band, the lyrics are an attack on the hollowness of a lifestyle centred around the consumerism which is offered by capitalism, describing how society expects young people to conform. The line "From feudal serf to spender" draws a direct parallel between slavery of peasants to the lord of their manor under the Feudal system in medieval times and the brand loyalty of people in modern capitalist societies, which the companies use to their advantage in pursuit of profit.

== Background ==
The song was derived from the early Manic Street Preachers songs "Go, Buzz Baby, Go" (with which it shares the chord structure and the phrase "Motorcycle Emptiness" late in the song over the verse chords) and "Behave Yourself Baby", a rough demo with a similar structure, that has the lines "All we want from you is the skin you live within", similar to "All we want from you are the kicks you've given us" in this song.

Nicky Wire said of the song's creative process "A real amalgam. Part of a song called Go Buzz Baby Go, and before that was a song called Behave Yourself Baby which was the bridge. The lyric took a long time. We crammed so many words in there, and it is bizarre, so busy. It was the first time we looked at each other as a band and thought perhaps we can actually do something."

Sean Moore said "It's something like four songs put together. The main guitar part was the producer, Steve Brown, telling James that we needed a riff going through the song", while James Dean Bradfield recalled "We'd had the demo for that since we were about 17, but played in more of a New Order style then. Steve Brown said it needed a solo, and he just left me in the studio and gave me an hour. He came back and went: "You're a guitar god now!" It sounds corny, but he made this white-trash Taff feel good. He told me I had to find my Slash moment. That's good production, as far as I'm concerned."

Some of the lyrics are taken from the poem "Neon Loneliness" (the first line of the chorus, "Under neon loneliness", is a direct lift) by Welsh poet Patrick Jones, the brother of Manics bass guitarist and lyricist Nicky Wire. "Motorcycle Emptiness" was also included on Forever Delayed, the Manics' greatest hits album, in October 2002, and released as a reissued single from the compilation in February 2003.

== Release and reception ==
"Motorcycle Emptiness" was released on 1 June 1992 by record label Columbia. The song reached number 17 on the UK Singles Chart on 13 June 1992. It remained there for another week and spent a total of six weeks in the top 75, a fortnight longer than any other Generation Terrorists single, and a record not surpassed by the Manics until 1996's "A Design for Life".

In 2003, a re-issue CD containing the title track, "4 Ever Delayed" and "Little Baby Nothing (Acoustic)" was released in Europe as promotion for the band's Forever Delayed greatest hits compilation.

Awarding it 'Best New Single' in Smash Hits, Tom Doyle wrote: "Stripped of their punky backing, the Manics take a bit of a breather with this rousing classic of a tune which even features plucked violins!" He added: "[The single] proves that the Manics are much more than simply a punk parody and that they are capable of occasional brilliance."

== Music video ==
The video was filmed during a promotional visit to Japan in various locations, including the Shibuya Crossing and Cosmo Clock 21. It features the whole band, but with Bradfield appearing most, standing stationary and performing the song as crowds surge around him. The band appear in non-sequential shots, exploring the sites of Japan. At one point, Edwards appears trying to gain the attention of a tortoise.

== Remix ==
The song was remixed by Apollo-440 under their alternative name Stealth Sonic Orchestra as a piece of classical-style music. This remix was available as a track on the single "Australia" (taken from their 1996 album Everything Must Go), and was also used by T-Mobile for an advertising campaign in 2003.

A contestant, David Martin, performed an acoustic version in 2002 during the knockout stages of the first series of the reality show, Fame Academy.

== Legacy ==
In 2006, Q magazine readers voted the song as the 88th best song ever.

== Track listings ==
CD
No.	Title	Length
1.	"Motorcycle Emptiness"	6:02
2.	"Bored Out of My Mind"	2:57
3.	"Crucifix Kiss" (live)	3:10
4.	"Under My Wheels" (live)	3:01

12-inch picture disc
No.	Title	Length
1.	"Motorcycle Emptiness"	6:02
2.	"Bored Out of My Mind"	2:57
3.	"Under My Wheels" (live)	3:01

7-inch and cassette
No.	Title	Length
1.	"Motorcycle Emptiness"	6:02
2.	"Bored Out of My Mind"	2:57

1997 reissue CD
No.	Title	Length
1.	"Motorcycle Emptiness"	6:02
2.	"Bored Out of My Mind"	2:57
3.	"Under My Wheels" (live)	3:01
4.	"Crucifix Kiss" (live)	3:10

2003 reissue CD [Finland]
No.	Title	Length
1.	"Motorcycle Emptiness"	6:02
2.	"Faster" (live acoustic)	4:20
3.	"Little Baby Nothing" (live acoustic)	4:54

2003 reissue CD [Germany]
No.	Title	Length
1.	"Motorcycle Emptiness"	6:02
2.	"Forever Delayed"	3:38
3.	"Little Baby Nothing" (live acoustic)	4:54

== Charts ==
Chart (1992)	Peak position
Australia (ARIA)	151
Belgium (Ultratop 50 Flanders)	35
Europe (Eurochart Hot 100)	76
Israel (IBA)	19
Netherlands (Dutch Top 40)	24
Netherlands (Single Top 100)	21
New Zealand (Recorded Music NZ)	35
UK Singles (Official Charts)	17
UK Airplay (Music Week)	38

== Certifications ==
Region	Certification	Certified units/sales
United Kingdom (BPI)	Gold	400,000^{‡}
^{‡} Sales+streaming figures based on certification alone.

== Release history ==
Region	Date	Format(s)	Label(s)	Ref.
United Kingdom	1 June 1992	7-inch vinyl; 12-inch vinyl; CD; cassette	Columbia	
Japan	25 June 1992	CD	Epic	
Australia	20 July 1992	CD; cassette	Columbia	
