= Stay Beautiful (Manic Street Preachers song) =

Song by Manic Street Preachers

Single by Manic Street Preachers

from the album Generation Terrorists
- Released: 29 July 1991
- Recorded: Mid 1991
- Genre: Punk rock; glam punk; hard rock
- Label: Columbia
- Songwriters: James Dean Bradfield; Nicky Wire; Sean Moore; Richey Edwards

Manic Street Preachers singles chronology
"You Love Us (Heavenly Version)" (1991)	"Stay Beautiful" (1991)	"Love's Sweet Exile" (1991)

"Stay Beautiful" is a song by Welsh alternative rock band Manic Street Preachers, released on 29 July 1991 by record label Columbia as the first single from the band's debut album, Generation Terrorists.

== Content ==
The track started out under the working title of "Generation Terrorists" and originally featured the lyrics "Why don't you just fuck off" in the chorus, which was later cut to "Why don't you just... [gap]" in the released version with a guitar fill in the aforementioned gap. It has since become customary for fans to shout the original lyric when the band occasionally perform the song live.

Marc Burrows of Drowned in Sound proclaimed "Stay Beautiful" a "straightforward punker", and "the most pure punk record in their arsenal" alongside "Repeat", and that it had "more in common with their earlier indie-label records [...] than it does with its parent album".

== Release ==
"Stay Beautiful" was released as a single on 29 July 1991 by record label Columbia. The single was the group's first top 40 hit on the UK Singles Chart, reaching number 40 on 10 August 1991. It was re-issued six years later but failed to return to the top 40, reaching number 52 on 13 September 1997.

The B-sides for all formats included "R.P. McMurphy", with the CD and 12-inch versions adding "Soul Contamination". The title of "R.P. McMurphy" is based on the protagonist of Ken Kesey's 1962 novel One Flew Over the Cuckoo's Nest (which was subsequently made into a film).

== Music video ==
The music video for the song features the band performing inside a garishly coloured house being splashed with paint, before the setting is demolished by a clay-mation space octopus at the conclusion; referencing themes and events in Alan Moore's Watchmen.

== Influence ==
The title of "Stay Beautiful" was used by Renault in a television advertisement for a car in reference to the song.

Longtime music press champion of the band Simon Price co-created alternative "glam/rock/trash" nightclub Stay Beautiful. Named after the song, it drew heavily on the ethos and attitudes of the band, and during a solo tour to promote his debut album I Killed The Zeitgeist, bassist Nicky Wire performed there.

== Track listings ==
CD version

No.	Title	Length
1.	"Stay Beautiful"	3:11
2.	"R.P. McMurphy"	4:05
3.	"Soul Contamination"	2:37

Note: CD version reissued in 1997

12-inch version

Side A
No.	Title	Length
1.	"Stay Beautiful"	3:11

Side B
No.	Title	Length
1.	"R.P. McMurphy"	4:05
2.	"Soul Contamination"	2:37

7-inch version

Side A
No.	Title	Length
1.	"Stay Beautiful"	3:11

Side B
No.	Title	Length
1.	"R.P. McMurphy"	4:05

== Charts ==
Chart (1991)	Peak position
UK Singles (OCC)	40

== Release history ==
Region	Date	Format(s)	Label	Ref.
United Kingdom	29 July 1991	7-inch vinyl; 12-inch vinyl; CD	Columbia	
United Kingdom	5 August 1991	12-inch poster sleeve vinyl	Columbia	
Australia	21 October 1991	12-inch vinyl; CD	Columbia	
Japan	25 October 1991	CD	Epic	
