= You Love Us =

1991 single by Manic Street Preachers

"You Love Us (Heavenly Version)"

Single by Manic Street Preachers
- B-side: "Spectators of Suicide (Heavenly Version)"; "Starlover" (CD and 12"); "Strip It Down (Live at Bath Moles)" (CD and 12")
- Released: 7 May 1991
- Recorded: Early 1991
- Genre: Glam punk
- Label: Heavenly
- Songwriters: James Dean Bradfield, Nicky Wire, Sean Moore, Richey Edwards
- Producer: Robin Wynn Evans

Manic Street Preachers singles chronology
"Motown Junk" (1991)	"You Love Us (Heavenly Version)" (1991)	"Stay Beautiful" (1991)

"You Love Us (Sony Version)"

Single by Manic Street Preachers

from the album Generation Terrorists
- B-side: "A Vision of Dead Desire"; "It's So Easy" (CD and 12"); "We Her Majesty's Prisoners" (CD)
- Released: 20 January 1992
- Recorded: Mid 1991
- Genre: Glam metal; punk rock
- Length: 3:14 (single edit), 4:18 (album version)
- Label: Columbia
- Songwriters: James Dean Bradfield, Nicky Wire, Sean Moore, Richey Edwards

Manic Street Preachers singles chronology
"Love's Sweet Exile" (1991)	"You Love Us (Sony Version)" (1992)	"Slash 'n' Burn" (1992)

"You Love Us" is a song by Welsh alternative rock band Manic Street Preachers. It was initially released as a single on 7 May 1991 by Heavenly Recordings. A re-recorded version was released on 20 January 1992 by Columbia Records as the third single from the band's debut studio album, Generation Terrorists (1992).

== Release ==
"You Love Us" was originally released as a single on 7 May 1991 by record label Heavenly. This version of the song begins with a sample of Krzysztof Penderecki's "Threnody to the Victims of Hiroshima" and ends with a coda which includes a drum sample from Iggy Pop's "Lust for Life".

B-side "Spectators of Suicide" includes a vocal sample of a speech by Black Panther Bobby Seale, a shorter clip of which had previously appeared on the last track of McCarthy's 1989 album The Enraged Will Inherit the Earth.

"You Love Us" was re-recorded and released as the third single from Generation Terrorists on 20 January 1992. The new version also featured no hook, but had a much heavier rock sound and the "Lust for Life" coda was replaced, on the album version of the track, by an extended guitar solo. This version of the song reached number 16 in the UK charts on 1 February 1992. It was the most successful single released from the album. It also made an appearance as track number six on the 2002 greatest hits compilation, Forever Delayed.

The CD single included the B-sides "A Vision of Dead Desire", "We Her Majesty's Prisoners" and a live cover of Guns N' Roses' "It's So Easy". The 12" featured "A Vision of Dead Desire" and "It's So Easy" and the 7" and cassette just "A Vision of Dead Desire".

== Content and style ==
David Owens proclaimed the track a "firebrand punk classic". By Clash Music, You Love Us has been illustrated as an example of "glam metal glory".

== Live performances ==
The song was performed live with missing guitarist and lyricist Richey James Edwards just five weeks before he vanished, which was the last time Edwards was seen on stage. The band as a foursome played the song as set-closer for their sell-out final gig at the London Astoria.

== Legacy ==
"You Love Us" is widely regarded as one of the band's best songs. In 2011, NME ranked the song number six on their list of the 10 greatest Manic Street Preachers songs, and in 2022, The Guardian ranked the song number five on their list of the 30 greatest Manic Street Preachers songs.

In December 2015, Cardiff brewers Crafty Devil named a beer after the song.

== Track listing ==
=== 1991 Heavenly Version ===
CD version

No.	Title	Length
1.	"You Love Us"	4:27
2.	"Spectators of Suicide"	5:05
3.	"Starlover"	2:41
4.	"Strip It Down" (live at Bath Moles)	2:40

12" version

Side A
No.	Title	Length
1.	"You Love Us"	4:27
2.	"Spectators of Suicide"	5:05

Side B
No.	Title	Length
1.	"Starlover"	2:41
2.	"Strip It Down" (live at Bath Moles)	2:40

7" version

Side A
No.	Title	Length
1.	"You Love Us"

Side B
No.	Title	Length
1.	"Spectators of Suicide"

=== 1992 Sony Version ===
CD version

No.	Title	Length
1.	"You Love Us"	4:18
2.	"A Vision of Dead Desire"	3:14
3.	"We Her Majesty's Prisoners"	5:22
4.	"It's So Easy" (live Guns N' Roses cover at London Marquee, 4 September 1991)	2:52

Note: CD version reissued in 1997

12" version

Side A
No.	Title	Length
1.	"You Love Us"	4:18

Side B
No.	Title	Length
1.	"A Vision of Dead Desire"	3:14
2.	"It's So Easy" (live Guns N' Roses cover at London Marquee, 4 September 1991)	2:52

7" version

Side A
No.	Title	Length
1.	"You Love Us"

Side B
No.	Title	Length
1.	"A Vision of Dead Desire"

Japanese CD version

No.	Title	Length
1.	"You Love Us" (edit)	3:16
2.	"You Love Us" (full)	4:18
3.	"You Love Us" (Heavenly)	4:26
4.	"It's So Easy" (live Guns N' Roses cover at London Marquee, 4 September 1991)	2:52

== Charts ==
Chart (1991)	Peak position
UK Singles (Official Charts)	62

Chart (1992)	Peak position
UK Singles (Official Charts)	16
UK Airplay (Music Week)	48
