= Motown Junk =

Song by Manic Street Preachers

Single by Manic Street Preachers
- B-side: "Sorrow 16"; "We Her Majesty's Prisoners"
- Released: 21 January 1991
- Recorded: Late 1990
- Genre: Punk metal; glam metal
- Length: 4:00
- Label: Heavenly
- Songwriters: James Dean Bradfield, Nicky Wire, Sean Moore, Richey Edwards
- Producer: Robin Wynn Evans

Manic Street Preachers singles chronology
| "New Art Riot" (1990) | "Motown Junk" (1991) | "You Love Us (Heavenly Version)" (1991) |

"Motown Junk" is the second single by Welsh alternative rock band Manic Street Preachers, released on 21 January 1991 by Heavenly.

== Release ==
"Motown Junk" was released on 21 January 1991 by record label Heavenly, the band's first release on this label. It peaked at number 94 on the UK Singles Chart. Despite its relatively poor charting, the single gained the band much attention from the press.

In 2008, the band added a "Johnny Boy Anniversary Mix" free embedded version to their official website, which featured spoken dialogue by Richey Edwards.

In 2011, Heavenly re-released "Motown Junk" to sell at the Manic Street Preachers gig on 21 May 2011 and at the Berwick Independent Marker.

The track has long been a live favourite throughout their career.

== Content ==
The title track shows the band during their pinnacle of iconoclastic attitude, such as in the lyric, "I laughed when Lennon got shot". The "Motown" in the title refers to famed 1960s and 1970s label Motown Records. The song also displayed their diverse cultural scope with a Public Enemy-sampling intro and an outro sample of The Skids.

Mark Corcoran of NARC adjudged the song to pertain to the punk metal style.

Both B-sides featured on the single, "Sorrow 16" and "We Her Majesty's Prisoners", were on the later singles "Slash 'n' Burn" and "You Love Us", respectively, both from the band's debut album Generation Terrorists (1992). The single was the band's first from their then record label Heavenly Records.

The single's cover features a watch recovered from the Hiroshima bomb site depicting the exact moment of detonation.

The outro of the song samples the outro of the single 'Charles' by the Skids with James Dean Bradfield often citing Stuart Adamson as one of his influences.

== Legacy ==
In 2011, NME ranked the song number three on their list of the 10 greatest Manic Street Preachers songs, and in 2022, The Guardian ranked the song number 12 on their list of the 30 greatest Manic Street Preachers songs. NME included the song at no. 244 in their list of 500 Greatest Songs of All Time, with the description: "They were still stencilling their own t-shirts and playing to half-full pub back rooms, but this icon-skewering single showed that the Manics meant business."

In subsequent live performances of the song, Bradfield generally skips the lyric "I laughed when Lennon got shot," or replaces his name with a different word, such as in their Millennium concert Leaving the 20th Century, in which Lennon is replaced by the word "Misty". In a 2008 interview with The Quietus, Bradfield remarked, “I remember when I got that lyric, it felt like that Bill Hicks notion: why is it that the good people always get assassinated?"

== Track listing ==
CD version

| No. | Title | Length |
|---|---|---|
| 1. | "Motown Junk" | 4:00 |
| 2. | "Sorrow 16" | 3:45 |
| 3. | "We Her Majesty's Prisoners" | 5:22 |

12" vinyl version

Side A
| No. | Title | Length |
|---|---|---|
| 1. | "Motown Junk" | 4:00 |
| 2. | "Sorrow 16" | 3:45 |

Side B
| No. | Title | Length |
|---|---|---|
| 1. | "We Her Majesty's Prisoners" | 5:22 |

7" vinyl version

Side A
| No. | Title | Length |
|---|---|---|
| 1. | "Motown Junk" | 4:00 |

Side B
| No. | Title | Length |
|---|---|---|
| 1. | "Sorrow 16" | 3:45 |

== Charts ==
| Chart (1991) | Peak position |
|---|---|
| UK Singles (Official Charts) | 94 |
