= Richey Edwards =

Welsh guitarist (1967–1995)

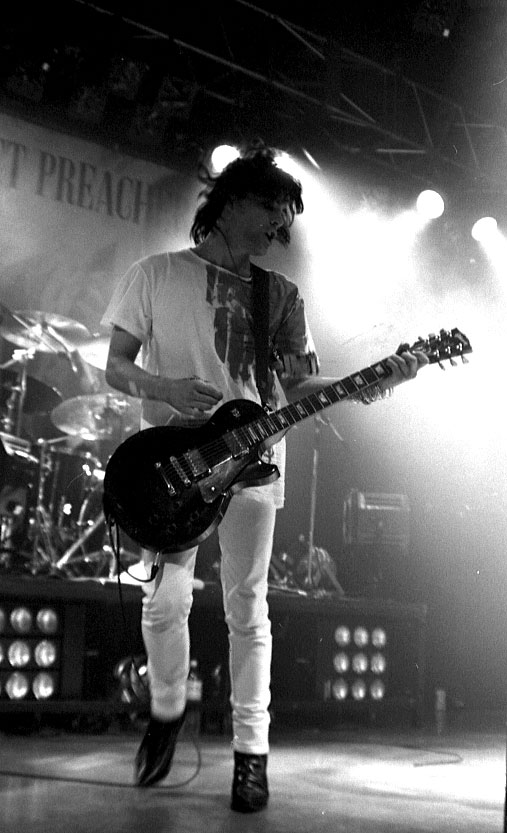
- Edwards in Japan, May 1992
- Born: Richard James Edwards; 22 December 1967; Blackwood, Caerphilly, Wales
- Disappeared: 1 February 1995 (aged 27); Cardiff, Wales
- Status: Missing for 31 years, 8 months and 15 days Declared dead in absentia 24 November 2008 (aged 40)
- Other names: Richey James; Richey Manic
- Education: University of Wales, Swansea
- Occupations: Musician; songwriter
- Musical career
- Genres: Punk rock; alternative rock; hard rock; glam punk
- Instrument: Guitar
- Years active: 1989–1995
- Formerly of: Manic Street Preachers

Signature
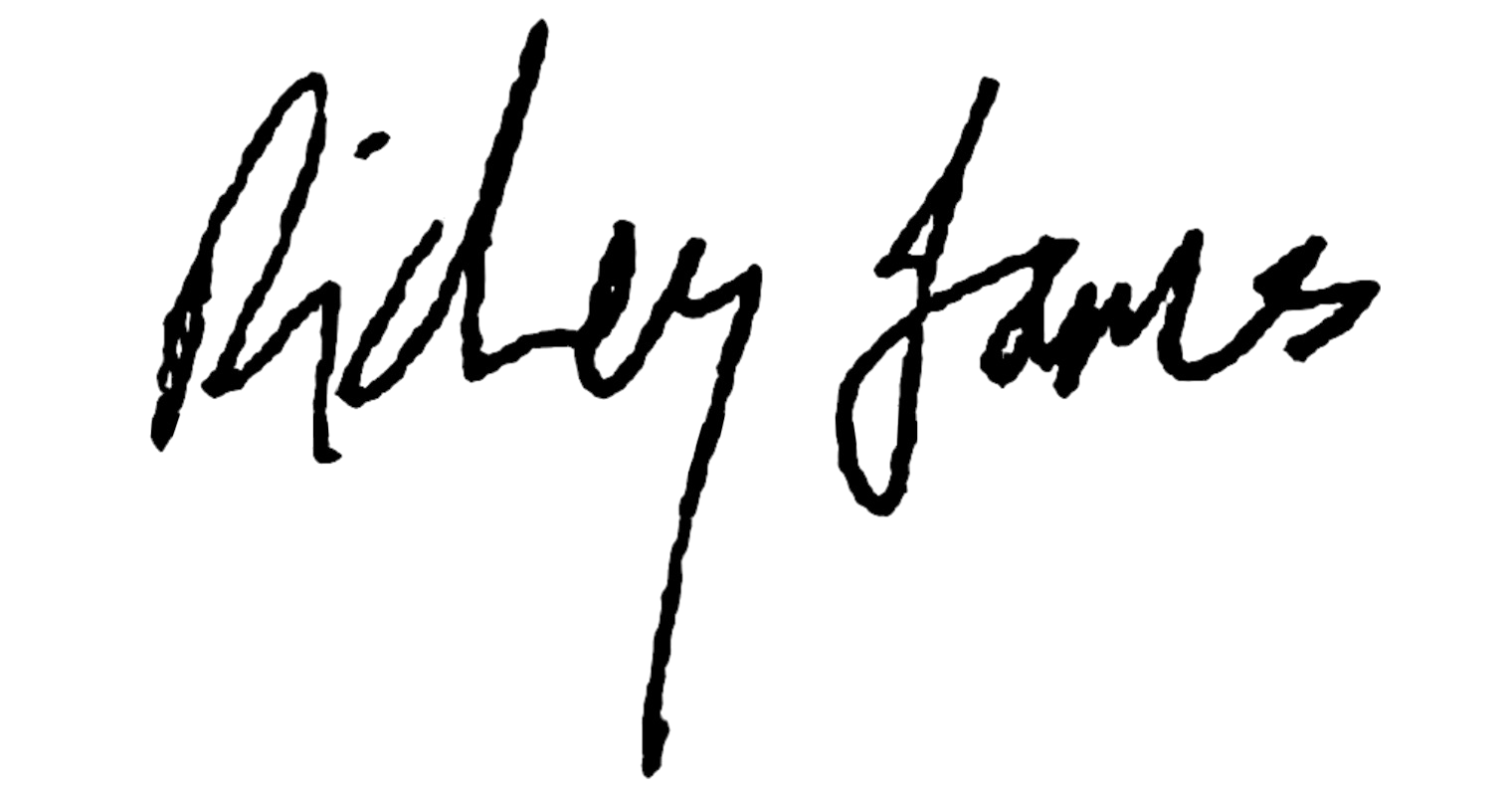

Richard James Edwards (22 December 1967 – disappeared 1 February 1995, declared dead 24 November 2008), also known as Richey James or Richey Manic, was a Welsh musician who was the lyricist and rhythm guitarist of the alternative rock band Manic Street Preachers. He was known for his dark, politicised and intellectual songwriting that, combined with an enigmatic and eloquent character, has assured him cult status; he has also been cited as a leading lyricist of his generation. Although he regularly involved himself in the band's songwriting, Edwards rarely recorded any guitar performances with the band.

Edwards disappeared on 1 February 1995. On 24 November 2008, he was legally declared dead "on or since" 1 February 1995. The ninth Manic Street Preachers album, Journal for Plague Lovers, released on 18 May 2009, is composed entirely of songs with lyrics left by Edwards. As of 2005, the remaining members of Manic Street Preachers were still paying 25% royalties into an account in his name.

== Early life ==
Richard James Edwards was born and raised in Blackwood, Caerphilly, Wales, to Graham and Sherry Edwards. He had one younger sister, Rachel (born 1969), with whom he was close:

It sounds like a cliché but it was a very happy family, a very happy upbringing. I know Richard is on record as having said the same thing. He was two years older than me and my overwhelming memory of our childhood is that he was very supportive of me. When I was at school I used to have a lot of anxiety, particularly around schoolwork. When I went on to comprehensive school, he'd already been there for a couple of years. At the end of each day we'd walk our dog Snoopy, I'd talk to him about my homework and he'd help me. He'd allay my fears, which, I suppose in retrospect, is ironic given the anxiety that he suffered years later.

— Rachel Edwards, GQ Magazine, April 2020

Edwards attended Oakdale Comprehensive School, alongside future bandmates Nicky Wire, Sean Moore and James Dean Bradfield. From 1986 to 1989, he attended University of Wales, Swansea to study Political History and graduated with a 2:1 degree.

== Career ==
Edwards was initially a driver and roadie for Manic Street Preachers. He was accepted as the band's main spokesman and fourth member in 1989. Edwards showed little interest in his guitar playing during the early years of the band; his real contribution was in their lyrics and design. When recalling Edwards' first live show, bassist Nicky Wire stated that Edwards "only did one song, he didn't know any of the others;" when asked about his guitar playing Edwards said, "Why is everyone hung up on an ugly piece of wood and metal and strings?" Accordingly, he only played on two songs during the band's studio career; however, along with Wire, Edwards was their principal lyricist. Edwards is said to have written approximately 80% of the lyrics on their third album, The Holy Bible. Both are credited on all songs written before Edwards' disappearance, with Edwards receiving sole credit on three tracks from the 1996 album Everything Must Go, and co-writing credits on another two.

Edwards expressed a desire to create a concept album described as "Pantera meets Nine Inch Nails meets Screamadelica". Bradfield, the band's lead guitarist and vocalist, later expressed doubt over whether the Manic Street Preachers would have produced such an album: "I was worried that as chief tune-smith in the band I wasn't actually going to be able to write things that he would have liked. There would have been an impasse in the band for the first time born out of taste."

Edwards suffered from severe depression, and was open about it in interviews. He self-harmed, mainly through stubbing cigarettes on his arms and cutting himself: "When I cut myself I feel so much better. All the little things that might have been annoying me suddenly seem so trivial because I'm concentrating on the pain. I'm not a person who can scream and shout so this is my only outlet. It's all done very logically." On 15 May 1991, after a gig at the Norwich Arts Centre, NME journalist Steve Lamacq questioned how serious Edwards was about his art; Edwards responded by carving the words "4 Real" into his forearm with a razor blade. The injury required eighteen stitches.

Edwards also suffered from insomnia, and used alcohol to help himself sleep at night. Before the release of The Holy Bible in 1994, he checked into Whitchurch Hospital and later the Priory hospital, missing out on some of the promotional work for the album and forcing the band to appear as a three piece at the Reading Festival and T in the Park. Following his release from the Priory in September, Manic Street Preachers toured Europe with Suede and Therapy? for what would be their last time with Edwards. Edwards' final live appearance was at the London Astoria, on 21 December 1994. The concert ended with the band smashing their equipment and destroying almost the entire lighting system, prompted by Edwards' violent destruction of his guitar towards the end of set closer "You Love Us".

== Disappearance and presumed death ==
Edwards disappeared on 1 February 1995, on the day when he and Bradfield were due to fly to the United States on a promotional tour of The Holy Bible. In the two weeks before his disappearance, Edwards withdrew £200 a day from his bank account, which totalled £2,800 by the day of the scheduled flight (equivalent to £7,991 in July 2026). It is unknown if he intended to spend the cash during the U.S. tour or whether a part of it was to pay for a desk he had ordered from a shop in Cardiff. There is no record of the desk being purchased, which also would only have explained half the money withdrawn.

According to Emma Forrest, as quoted in A Version of Reason, "The night before he disappeared Edwards gave a friend a book called Novel with Cocaine, instructing her to read the introduction, which details the author staying in a mental asylum before vanishing." While staying at the Embassy Hotel in Bayswater Road, London, according to Rob Jovanovic's biography, Edwards removed some books and videos from his bag. Among them was a copy of the play Equus. Edwards placed them in a box with a note that said, "I love you", wrapped the box like a birthday present and decorated it with collages and literary quotations, including a picture of a Germanic-looking house and Bugs Bunny. The package was addressed to Edwards' on/off girlfriend, Jo, whom he met some years prior, although they had split a few weeks earlier.

The next morning, 1 February 1995, Edwards collected his wallet, car keys, some fluoxetine and his passport. He reportedly checked out of the Embassy Hotel at 7:00 am, leaving his toiletries, packed suitcase and some of his fluoxetine. He then drove to his flat in Cardiff, where he left behind his passport, his fluoxetine and a Severn Bridge tollbooth receipt.

This timeline was refuted in 2018, when the authors of Withdrawn Traces: Searching for the truth about Richey Manic (Penguin Books, 2019) found evidence that disputed the timings of the toll booth receipt found from the Severn Bridge. It had been assumed that '2:55' on the ticket was 2:55 pm, but in 2018 the original software engineer at the bridge confirmed the software printed out the 24-hour clock, meaning Edwards passed this location at 2:55 am. Therefore, the timeline of events and subsequent appeals for information were no longer valid.

In the two weeks that followed, Edwards was apparently spotted in the Newport passport office and at Newport bus station by a fan who was unaware that he was missing. The fan was reported to have discussed a mutual friend, Lori Fidler, before Edwards departed. On 7 February, a taxi driver from Newport supposedly picked up Edwards from the King's Hotel and drove him around the valleys, including Edwards' hometown of Blackwood. The driver reported that the passenger had spoken in a Cockney accent, which occasionally slipped into a Welsh one, and that he had asked if he could lie down on the back seat. Eventually they reached Blackwood and its bus station, but the passenger reportedly said, "This is not the place," and asked to be taken to Pontypool railway station. It was later ascertained, according to Jovanovic's account, that Pontypool did not have a telephone. The passenger got out at the Severn View service station near Aust, South Gloucestershire, and paid the £68 fare in cash.

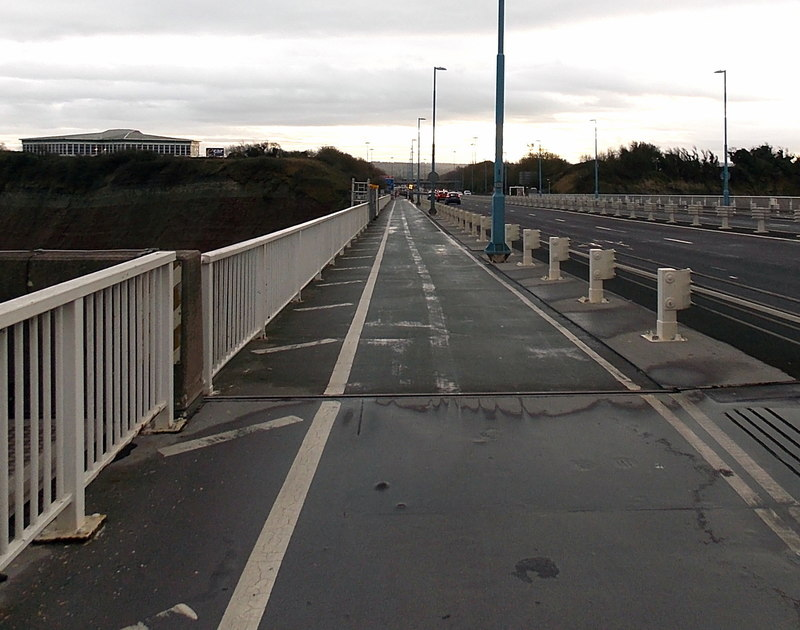
Aust services (top left), Gloucestershire, England, where Edwards' car was found abandoned 17 February 1995, viewed from Severn Bridge

Location car found

On 14 February, Edwards' Vauxhall Cavalier received a parking ticket at the Severn View service station, and on 17 February, the vehicle was reported as abandoned. Police discovered the battery to be dead, with evidence that the car had been lived in. The car also had photos Edwards had taken of his family days prior. Due to the service station's proximity to the Severn Bridge, a known suicide site, it was widely believed that Edwards had jumped from the bridge. Edwards had referred to suicide in 1994, saying, "In terms of the 'S' word, that does not enter my mind. And it never has done, in terms of an attempt. Because I am stronger than that. I might be a weak person, but I can take pain."

Since then, Edwards has reportedly been spotted in a market in Goa, India, and on the islands of Fuerteventura and Lanzarote. There have been other alleged sightings, especially in the years immediately following Edwards' disappearance. However, none of these has proved conclusive, and none has been confirmed by investigators.

The investigation into Edwards' disappearance has received criticism. In his 1999 book Everything (A Book About Manic Street Preachers), Simon Price states that aspects of the investigation were "far from satisfactory". He asserts police may not have taken Edwards' mental state into account when prioritizing his disappearance, and also records Edwards' sister as having "hit out at police handling" after CCTV footage was analysed two years after Edwards had vanished. Price records a member of the investigation team as stating "that the idea that you could identify somebody from that is arrant nonsense." While Edwards' family had the option of declaring him legally dead from 2002 onwards, they chose not to for many years, and his status remained open as a missing person until 23 November 2008, when he became officially "presumed dead".

=== Legacy ===
On 8 April 1995, an issue of Melody Maker was released in conjunction with the Samaritans regarding depression, self-harm and suicide. The magazine had received a number of letters from fans distressed at both the anniversary of the death of Kurt Cobain and the disappearance of Edwards. The 8 April edition saw Melody Maker assemble a panel of readers to discuss the issues related to both cases. Then-editor Allan Jones placed the inspiration for the special nature of the issue firmly in the hands of the readers: "Every week the mailbag is just full of these letters. Richey's predicament seems to be emblematic of what a lot of people are going through." Jones saw the debate as focusing on the notion of whether "our rock stars are more vulnerable these days, and is that vulnerability a reflection of the vulnerability of their audience? And if so, why?"

On 21 April, Caitlin Moran, writing in The Times, commented that Edwards became "a cause celebre among depressives, alcoholics, anorectics, and self-mutilators, because he was the first person in the public eye to talk openly about these subjects, not with swaggering bravado and a subtext of 'look how tortured and cool I am', but with humility, sense and, often, bleak humour". Moran dismissed the mainstream media's narrative, which was geared towards the idea that Edwards inspired copycat actions in fans. With regard to the 8 April edition of Melody Maker, Moran wrote of her distaste of the media treatment in general: "Arms were flung aloft and tongues tutted two weeks back, when the first anniversary of Kurt Cobain's suicide coincided with the two-month marking of ... Richey Edwards' disappearance, and Melody Maker instigated a debate on escalating teenage depression, self-mutilation and suicide." Nevertheless, Moran said "Cobain's actions and, to a greater extent, Richey Edwards's actions, have legitimised debate on these subjects".

== Literature and other cultural influences ==
Edwards displayed his love for literature in the band's music and lyrics. Albert Camus, Philip Larkin, William Blake, Tennessee Williams, Franz Kafka, and Arthur Rimbaud are known to have been among his favourite authors.

Quotes from Sylvia Plath, Valerie Solanas, Henrik Ibsen, Henry Miller and Friedrich Nietzsche appeared in the CD booklet of Generation Terrorists. Edwards also chose Primo Levi's poem "Song Of Those Who Died In Vain" to be reprinted in full on the back cover of Gold Against the Soul and a quote from Octave Mirbeau's The Torture Garden to appear on The Holy Bible. Numerous dialogue samples were used in songs from The Holy Bible, including those from authors J.G. Ballard and Hubert Selby Jr., along with the voice of John Hurt in the film adaptation of George Orwell's 1984. During 1992, the band would walk onstage to a tape of Allen Ginsberg reading his seminal 1955 poem "Howl".

== Books about Edwards ==
In 2019, Sara Hawys Roberts and Leon Noakes published Withdrawn Traces: Searching for the Truth About Richey Manic (Penguin Books, 2019), an official biography that provides fresh evidence that Edwards may have staged his disappearance. The book was published with consent from Edwards' sister, Rachel Edwards, who also wrote the foreword.

In 2009, Rob Jovanovic's book A Version of Reason: The Search for Richey Edwards of the Manic Street Preachers was published. The book was written with the goal of providing an authoritative factual account, pieced together through testimonials from those close to Edwards before his disappearance. The novel How I Left The National Grid by Guy Mankowski has been mentioned in passing in relation to the disappearance of Edwards, though this connection is only briefly noted in available sources and not substantively developed.

Howard Marks has also written a book about Edwards, Sympathy for the Devil, although his name has been changed to fictionalize the story. In Kieron Gillens' graphic novel Phonogram: Journey to the Past, one protagonist is a Manics fan who has 'split herself into two selves'; one is 'a self that waits, wraithlike, for disappeared guitarist and lyricist Richey Edwards to return and reclaim his position as pop-music prophet.'

== Discography and writing credits ==
With Manic Street Preachers

- Generation Terrorists (1992)
- Gold Against the Soul (1993)
- The Holy Bible (1994)
- Everything Must Go (1996)
- Journal for Plague Lovers (2009)

== See also ==
- List of people who disappeared mysteriously (1990s)
- 27 Club
