= Sleep Next to Plastic =

Compilation album by Manic Street Preachers
- Released: 5 July 2022
- Recorded: 1991–2022
- Genre: Alternative rock; hard rock; punk rock
- Length: 60:30
- Label: Sony

Manic Street Preachers chronology
The Ultra Vivid Lament (2021)	Sleep Next to Plastic (2022)	Critical Thinking (2025)

Sleep Next to Plastic, also known as Covers, is a compilation album by Welsh rock band Manic Street Preachers, released in 2022 by Sony Music. The repertoire includes covers of various artists recorded over three decades. The album's title derives from a lyric in Camper Van Beethoven's "Take the Skinheads Bowling" (Had a dream--I wanted to sleep next to plastic), which the band had covered as a B-side to their 1996 single Australia.

== Background ==
In 2021, the band released The Ultra Vivid Lament, the group's first album to top the UK Albums Chart since 1998. Around the same time, the group also started work on a special 20th anniversary edition of the album Know Your Enemy, released in 2001.

== Production ==
In 2022, Manic Street Preachers recorded a cover of Madonna's "Borderline" for the BBC 6 Music Festival in Cardiff. The cover ended up spearheading the new project, which brought together the group's covers that were not yet available on digital platforms. Amongst them were songs by artists and bands such as Nirvana, Guns 'N Roses, Amy Winehouse, Echo & the Bunnymen and Paul Simon. In a press release, the Manic Street Preachers said that "Cover versions have always offered us a chance to pay direct, public tribute to records we grew up obsessing over, be that C86 bands or artists as diverse as Madonna, John Cale and Paul Robeson. Collectively, these covers are a heartfelt musical tribute to our formative influences".

The original release Covers includes fifteen tracks. Soon after, this was renamed to Sleep Next to Plastic, and added two additional covers, namely of John Cale's "Endless Plain of Fortune" and Felt's "Primitive Painters". Sleep Next to Plastic is available in two forms, one an album containing just the 17 tracks previously unavailable to streaming, named Sleep Next to Plastic (Exclusives) and one a playlist, named Sleep Next to Plastic, which mixes the album with twenty other covers from the band's career.

== Songs ==
The cover of Madonna's "Borderline" was recorded exclusively for the compilation at the band's "Door to the River" recording studio in Caerleon, Newport, South Wales.

The cover of Pale Fountains' "Jean's Not Happening" was released for the first time on the album, having been a previously "lost" recording.

The cover of Fiction Factory's "(Feels Like) Heaven" was originally released as part of the BBC Radio 2 various artists compilation CD Sounds Of The 80s Volume 2 released on the 10th June 2016.

The cover of Nirvana's "Pennyroyal Tea" was originally recorded as part of a BBC Radio 1 evening session on 31st August 1994 and was later released on the compilation Evening Session Priority Tunes released on the 5th August 1996.

The cover of the Horrors' then upcoming song "Vision Blurred" was originally released on 18 May 2009 via NME daily download blog alongside the Horrors' remix of the Manics' "Doors Closing Slowly" as a free download that was available for only 24 hours. As the Horrors' eventually did not release their recording of the song, the Manics cover is the only officially released version commercially available.

The cover of Amy Winehouse's "Wake Up Alone" was originally released as part of the tribute CD Back To Back To Black released with the July 2012 edition of Q Magazine.

The full band version of Art Garfunkel's "Bright Eyes" was previously unreleased; an acoustic live version had been previously released as a b-side on the cassette of the group's 1996 single "A Design for Life" and the 2003 b-sides and rarities collection Lipstick Traces (A Secret History of Manic Street Preachers).

The cover of the June Brides' "The Instrumental" was recorded as part of the 2006 compilation Still Unravished - A Tribute to the June Brides.

The cover of John Cale's "Endless Plain of Fortune" was originally available via National Treasures – The Selected Singles, a 12-track vinyl version of the band's National Treasures – The Complete Singles compilation, given away exclusively with Q Magazine as part of the latter's 25th anniversary celebrations.

The cover of Felt's "Primitive Painters" was previously available as an exclusive track on the Japanese version of Journal for Plague Lovers.

== Track listing ==
No.	Title	Original artist	Length
1.	"Borderline"	Madonna	4:08
2.	"Jeans Not Happening" (feat. Finlay George)	Pale Fountains	4:02
3.	"(Feels Like) Heaven"	Fiction Factory	4:15
4.	"Pennyroyal Tea" (live at the BBC)	Nirvana	3:16
5.	"Let's Stay Together" (live at the BBC)	Al Green	2:44
6.	"Vision Blurred"	The Horrors	2:59
7.	"Wake Up Alone"	Amy Winehouse	3:36
8.	"Bright Eyes" (full band version)	Art Garfunkel	3:29
9.	"In Between Days" (live at the BBC)	The Cure	2:17
10.	"Sweet Child o' Mine" (live at Cardiff Castle)	Guns N' Roses	6:12
11.	"All or Nothing" (live at the BBC)	Small Faces	3:33
12.	"Bring on the Dancing Horses" (live at the BBC)	Echo & the Bunnymen	3:45
13.	"Under My Wheels" (live at the BBC)	Alice Cooper	2:59
14.	"The Instrumental"	The June Brides	3:22
15.	"Summer Wind" (live at the BBC)	Frank Sinatra	1:55
16.	"Endless Plain of Fortune"	John Cale	4:06
17.	"Primitive Painters"	Felt	3:42

== Charts ==
Chart performance for Sleep Next To Plastic
Chart (2022)	Peak position
iTunes Chart(UK)	13
