= Not the Only One (Fiction Factory song) =

Single by Fiction Factory

from the album Another Story
- B-side: "Let Me Be a Part"
- Released: 25 March 1985
- Genre: New wave
- Length: 4:02
- Label: Foundry, Virgin, RCA
- Songwriters: Kevin Patterson, Chic Medley
- Producers: Chic Medley, Kevin Patterson (co-producer)

Fiction Factory singles chronology
"All or Nothing" (1984)	"Not the Only One" (1985)	"No Time" (1985)

"Not the Only One" is a song by new wave band Fiction Factory, released on 25 March 1985 as the lead single from the band's second and final album, Another Story. The song was written and produced by Kevin Patterson and Chic Medley.

== Background ==
After the early 1984 top 10 UK hit with "(Feels Like) Heaven", the band's follow-up singles "Ghost of Love" and "All or Nothing" were commercial disappointments, with the former only reaching the UK top 75. The debut album Throw the Warped Wheel Out also failed to make the charts. By the time Fiction Factory began to write and record the follow-up album Another Story, a major change in band personnel had occurred, as the original members keyboardist and writer Eddie Jordan, drummer Mike Ogletree and bassist Graham McGregor had left the band. This left lead vocalist Kevin Patterson and guitarist Chic Medley to become the two remaining members, who in turn hired guest musicians for the recording of the album such as keyboardist Paul Wishart, guitarist Pim Jones, percussionist James Locke and brass player Graham Weir. The song, like the entire album, was recorded and mixed at The Planet, Castle Sound and Amazon Studios.

"Not the Only One" was the album's lead single, and like the two following single releases, it was a commercial failure. The album was also a flop, and the band disbanded shortly after. The album has since become out of print. The album's only CD release from Instant Records in Germany was limited and has become a collector's item, often selling for prices up to £500. "Not the Only One" did not have a promotional music video, but it was the only song to be performed on a TV show from the album. It was performed on the German TV show Musik Convoy on 6 May 1985. One main form of promotion was the small number of UK concerts the band performed around the time of the single and album release.

== Release ==
The single was released via 7" and 12" vinyl in the UK, Germany, Italy and Canada. Mainly released through Foundry Records, Virgin Records released the single directly in Canada. "Not the Only One" was the first single to be issued from Foundry Records - a UK independent label.

The 7" vinyl single featured the non-album B-side "Let Me Be a Part" - a song also written and produced by Patterson and Medley. This song was soon added as one of two bonus tracks on the 1985 CD release of Another Story, a limited issue in Germany by the label Instant Records. This was the only appearance outside of the single.

The 12" vinyl release featured a six-minute extended mix of "Not the Only One", as well as an exclusive mix of the same song titled "Not the Only One ('Mix' Mix)" and "Let Me Be a Part". The extended version of the song was the other of two bonus tracks on the CD issue of Another Story, where it was titled "Long Version". The "'Mix' Mix" version is largely notable from having removed all lead vocal from the song, but still keeping some backing vocal. A white label promo test pressing was also issued in the UK.

The single featured a full colour sleeve, with different front cover photographs between the 7" and 12" vinyl versions, but the overall same design. The 7" vinyl artwork saw Patterson and Medley standing on a rooftop overlooking a European city, whilst the 12" vinyl photograph showed the pair from a low-angle photograph, with a church tower in the background. Both photographs are uncredited.

Aside from the song's release on the Another Story album, and as a single, the song would also appear on three various artist compilations. The first two, both from 1985, was the Virgin Records European release Rock '85 (English Style) and the Virgin Records, Greek release Rock 80's Vol. 6. In 1987, it appeared on the German CD compilation Another Christmas Gift from Line, released by Line Records.

== Critical reception ==
Jerry Smith of Music Week wrote: "Well written pop featuring lively mid tempo dance beats, similar in style to their hit 'Feels Like Heaven'. With a strong, memorable chorus and strident keyboard, it seems assured of extensive radio play, no doubt followed by a good chart position."

== Formats ==
7" single

1. "Not the Only One" - 4:02
2. "Let Me Be a Part" - 3:02

12" single

1. "Not the Only One" (Extended Mix) - 6:13
2. "Not the Only One" ('Mix' Mix) - 3:52
3. "Let Me Be a Part" - 3:02

== Personnel ==
- Kevin Patterson - vocals, producer, engineer, programming
- Chic Medley - guitar, producer, engineer, programming
- Marwenna Laidlaw - backing vocals
- Pim Jones - guitar
- Paul Wishart - keyboards
- James Locke - percussion
- Pete Coleman - engineer
- Gordian Troeller, Steve Baker - management
