= The Secret He Had Missed =

Single by Manic Street Preachers

from the album The Ultra Vivid Lament
- Released: 16 July 2021
- Genre: Rock
- Length: 3:39
- Label: Columbia
- Songwriters: Nicky Wire; James Dean Bradfield; Sean Moore
- Producer: Dave Eringa

Manic Street Preachers singles chronology
"Orwellian" (2021)	"The Secret He Had Missed" (2021)	"Rosebud" (2022)

"The Secret He Had Missed" is a song by Manic Street Preachers presented as the second single from their 14th studio album The Ultra Vivid Lament. It was released on 16 July 2021, alongside an official YouTube video, directed by Kieran Evans and filmed in Tenby and Newport's Dolman Theatre.

The co-singer is Sunflower Bean's Julia Cumming, in a conversation styled-lyric, although the official video features the actress Aimee-Ffion Edwards.

== Background ==
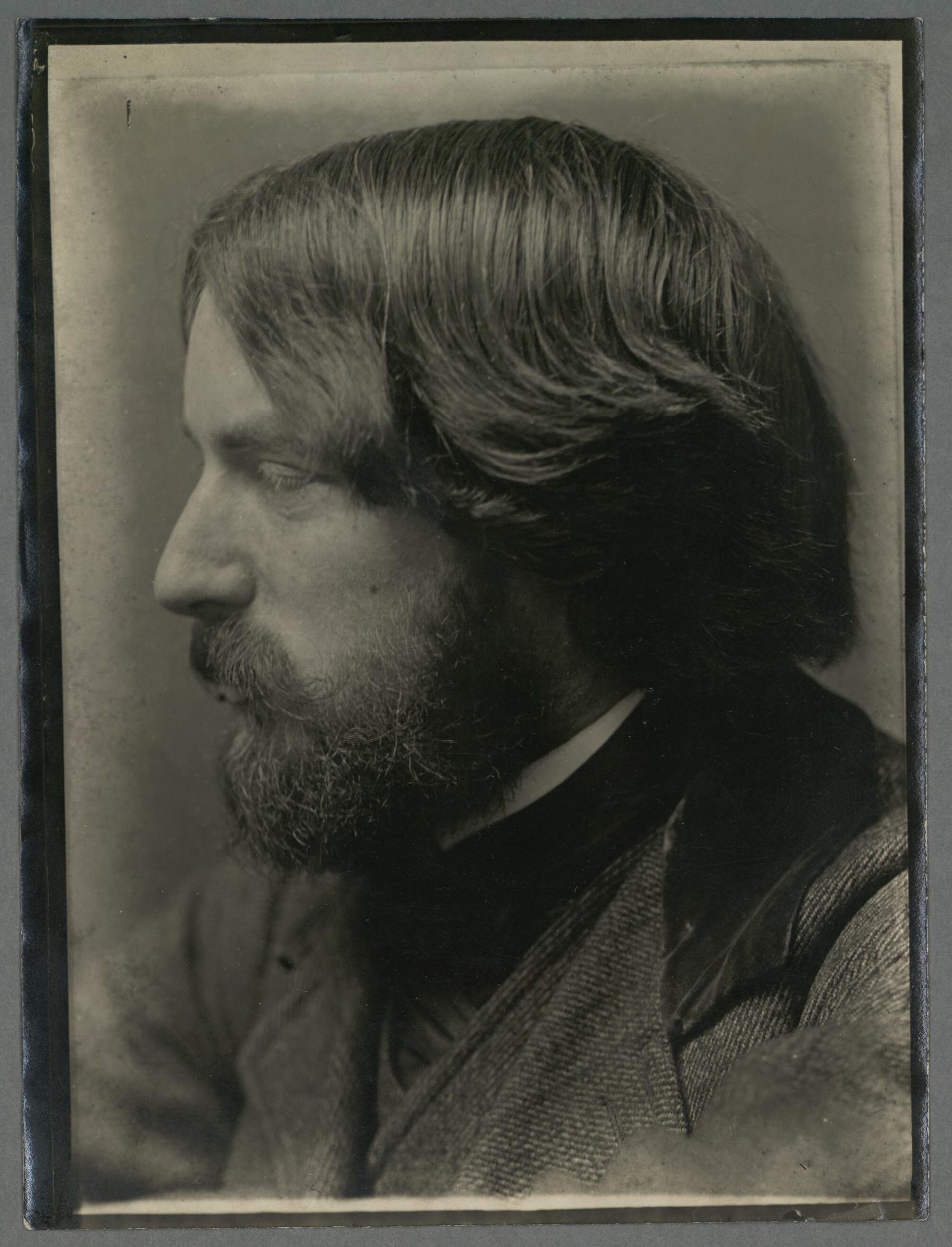
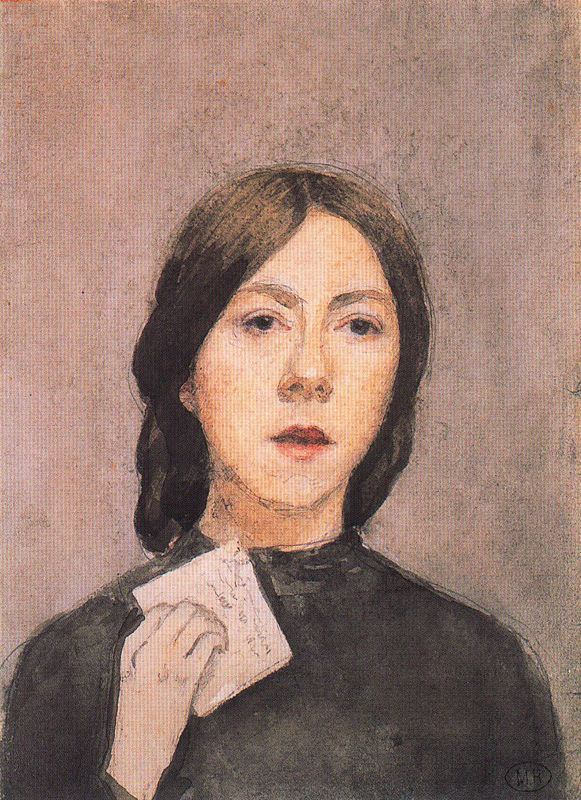
The song discusses the differences between the artists Augustus John and Gwen John, his sister. While Augustus was the more celebrated artist in his own lifetime he felt that Gwen would be better remembered, predicting that "I will be known as the brother of Gwen John."

The song tries to capture the dynamic between Augustus John and Gwen John, Wire commented: "It's about by how opposite their lives were. Augustus John was bohemian, reckless, amazingly talented but some might say wasted his talent. Then Gwen John was much more about the interior world, living an almost nun-like existence in France with very little possessions. It just goes to show how different it can turn out between a brother and sister." Musically, Wire says that "It's probably the most Abba-influenced track on the album, the piano track especially, it all came out really naturally. It's what we would call pop in our world – that glacial kind of controlled energy that comes out in something melancholic, but uplifting."

About the new collaboration Wire said that it was a "fanboy thing", sharing that "'Twenty Two in Blue' is just one of my favourite records of all time", concluding that "We were looking for something with no histrionics. We get really tired of singers just going up and down scales and showing off in the modern era. The genius of Abba is how the vocals are always so controlled, they're never over the top." He continued: "Julia can do that easily anyway. She's always really controlled and within herself. Once she got the Abba thing and the Billy Joel pianos she really enjoyed it and just breathed through it. She's an unbelievably underrated talent."

== Release ==
The song was released on 16 July 2021, available through download.

About the song, The Quietus says that "is more intricately interwoven with another, more recent Manics song. 'Dylan And Caitlin', from Resistance Is Futile, was another duet (with The Anchoress taking the female role), about the relationship between another Wales-based artistic male and female duo, Dylan Thomas and Caitlin Thomas (nee McNamara). The stories of the Johns and the Thomases are interlinked: the Thomases were both painted by Augustus John, in Caitlin's case during her early teens, during which time John raped her. Later, it was Augustus John who introduced the Thomases. Caitlin, like Gwen, lived in France for a while. While joining a long line of art-related Manics songs (from 'La Tristesse Durera' to 'Interiors' to 'Black Square'), its closest cousin musically is 'Your Love Alone Is Not Enough', with an almost equally rousing chorus, and Julia Cumming's restrained vocal bearing a close similarity to that of Nina Persson. It's an interesting exercise, albeit one which is unduly humane to a rapist. And it's one the album's most Wales-specific moment, complete with references to the beach at Tenby."

The Line of Best Fit argues that the song is "a quasi-aria framework with Bradfield, the latter is led by the discipline imposed by the Sean Moore and Nicky Wire's rhythm section".

== Personnel ==
Manic Street Preachers

- James Dean Bradfield – lead vocals, guitar
- Nicky Wire – bass guitar
- Sean Moore – drums

Additional musicians

- Julia Cumming – vocals
