= Orwellian =

Adjective derived from the author George Orwell

External videos
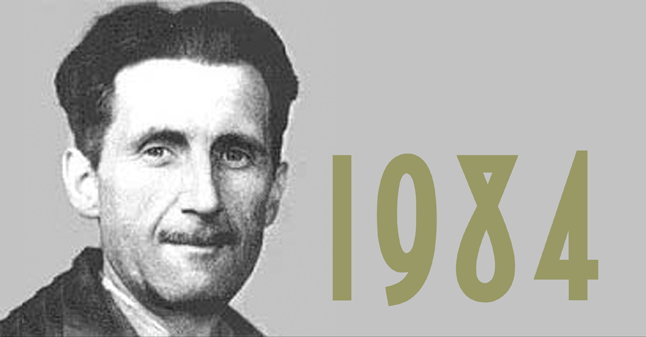
- What "Orwellian" really means – Noah Tavlin (5:31), TED-Ed

Orwellian is an adjective which is used to describe a situation, an idea or a societal condition suggested in the writings of 20th century author George Orwell, usually identified as being destructive to a free and open society. It was first used by the American author Mary McCarthy in 1950. The term denotes draconian control by propaganda, surveillance, disinformation, and denial of truth. It is commonly used in reference to Orwell's 1949 dystopian novel Nineteen Eighty-Four which describes an oppressive fictional totalitarian society where propaganda is used to manipulate the population. Orwell was particularly concerned with the degradation of language and wrote about this in his 1946 essay Politics and the English Language. The term was described in The New York Times as the most commonly used adjective derived from an author's name. Critics have commented on its prolific use, stating that the term is often misunderstood, misused and applied with contradictory meaning.

== Definition ==
The Oxford English Dictionary defines "Orwellian" as: "Characteristic or suggestive of the writings of George Orwell, esp. of the totalitarian state depicted in his dystopian account of the future, Nineteen Eighty-four (1949)."

== Origin ==
The earliest known use of the term was in 1950 when the American author Mary McCarthy described a new magazine in her essay titled Up the Ladder From Charm to Vogue as "a leap into the Orwellian future".

== Background ==
George Orwell was the pen name for Eric Arthur Blair. He was a prolific writer as a columnist, essayist and book reviewer, but his two dystopian novels, Animal Farm and Nineteen Eighty-Four remain the focus of his legacy. Nineteen Eighty-Four was written as a warning against the degradation of language and against the propaganda used to manipulate the masses within its fictional totalitarian regime. During his life, Orwell was deeply concerned by the consensus of reality and its fragility. While volunteering as a fighter for the POUM in the Spanish Civil War, he had witnessed first-hand how the Republicans denounced each other as traitors and how their shared understanding broke down. In his 1946 essay titled "Politics and the English Language", Orwell wrote about the distortion of language including the use of "dying metaphors", terms that have been so commonly used, they lose their meaning.

...there is a huge dump of worn-out metaphors which have lost all evocative power and are merely used because they save people the trouble of inventing phrases for themselves.[...] Many of these are used without knowledge of their meaning [...] and incompatible metaphors are frequently mixed, a sure sign that the writer is not interested in what he is saying. Some metaphors now current have been twisted out of their original meaning without those who use them even being aware of the fact.

— George Orwell, Politics and the English Language, The Orwell Foundation

In Nineteen Eighty-Four Orwell described the oppressive society of Oceania, a totalitarian superstate controlled by the all-powerful ruling Party. It follows the story of Winston Smith, whose job involves rewriting historical documents to match the ever changing Party line. He begins to rebel against the Party by committing thoughtcrime and engaging in an illicit affair with fellow worker Julia. Eventually they are arrested by the Thought Police and tortured until they are converted to obedient citizens.

A prominent aspect of Orwell's fictional dystopian world is his constructed language named Newspeak. Nineteen Eighty-Four ends with an appendix explaining the words used in the Party's official language. In developing Newspeak, Oceanian linguists aim to create a perfect language in which words are standardised, vocabulary is limited, and thoughtcrime is impossible. They endlessly labour over its refinement by simplifying language to reduce the ability to express complex ideas. In doing this, the totalitarian regime aims to maintain complete power over the Oceanian population.

The ruling Party controls reality in the Newspeak word doublethink, which describes the act of accepting two contradictory statements simultaneously: "the ability to believe that black is white, and more, to know that black is white, and to forget that one has ever believed the contrary". The manipulation of historical record and collective memory are at the centre of Oceania's political system Ingsoc. The Party's slogan is: "Who controls the past controls the future: who controls the present controls the past". Additionally, thoughtcrime is monitored by the telescreen, a two-way video device which is omnipresent and used for surveillance of the population. It is also a medium for broadcasting propaganda to the masses to generate love for the leader, Big Brother, in the daily, ritualistic Two Minutes Hate.

Richard Blair, Orwell's son commented that the manipulation of truth is the main reason for the novel's continued relevance. Orwell biographer D. J. Taylor said that readers found Orwell's novel particularly alarming and plausible because it is set in the recognisable location of London in a devastated postwar England despite being set in the year 1984.

== Interpretations ==
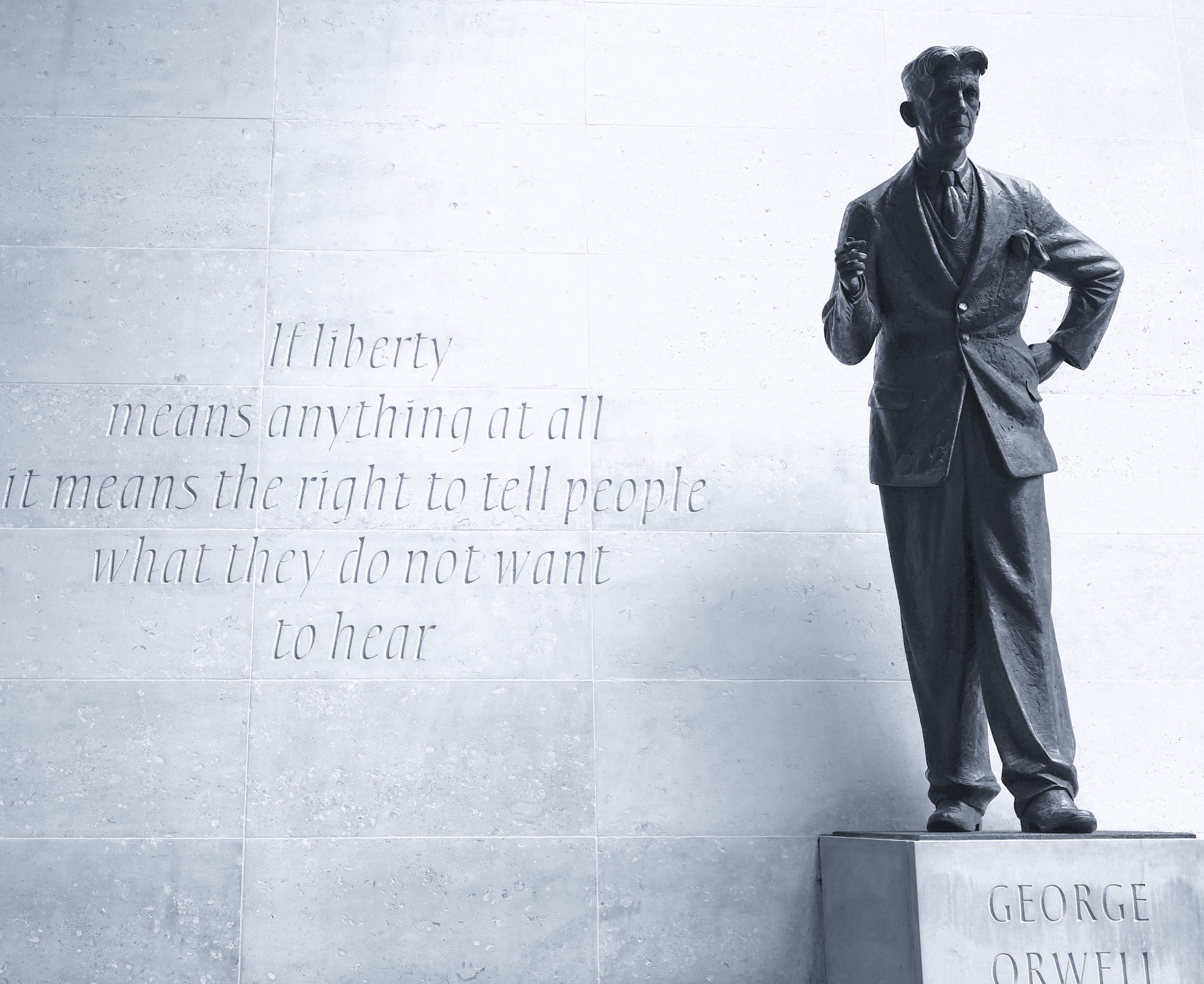
A statue of George Orwell at the BBC Broadcasting House in Portland Place, London, with an inscription quoting Orwell: "If liberty means anything at all, it means the right to tell people what they do not want to hear".

The term "Orwellian" has been interpreted in various ways. Laura Beers said that it refers to state oppression and the power to censor ideas and debate. She noted: "Orwell was thinking about a society where people who spoke out were jailed, potentially executed and were kind of disappeared." Dean's research professor Michael Sheldon commented that the term is used by many to refer to an individual being punished for having unpopular ideas or challenging mainstream opinion. He stated that in Nineteen Eighty-Four, Orwell was illustrating that "a society that doesn't have free thought doesn't have anything". Author Clint Smith focused on aspects of Orwell's writing, namely, "surveillance, government control, propaganda, and the erasure, distortion, or manipulation of the truth". Taylor wrote that Orwell was primarily concerned with three issues; the denial of objective truth, the manipulation of language, and the rise of the surveillance society. He said: "That to me, is the definition of the adjective 'Orwellian' in the 21st century."

== Criticism ==
Sam Jordison writing in The Guardian stated that the term is overused, misunderstood and applied with contradictory meanings. It can be used as a compliment, where describing an individual as "Orwellian" means they are on the same side. It can also be used as an insult to describe something that an individual dislikes. Jordison concluded that its use is so prolific, that it has the potential to describe anything. Geoffrey Nunberg of The New York Times wrote that its use narrowly refers to Orwell's most widely known works; Animal Farm, Nineteen Eighty-Four and the essay "Politics and the English Language". In the latter, Orwell wrote how political language "is designed to make lies sound truthful and murder respectable, and to give an appearance of solidity to pure wind". Nunberg noted that the term "Orwellian" contributes to this by implying an "aesthetic judgment". In a Financial Times article, Naoise Dolan wrote that Orwell's name is misused to provide the answer to many topics based on broad assumptions about his opinions and that "Orwellian" is used to imply his foresight into anything that writers choose: "Orwell, the thinker, elaborated his views with rigour and specificity. Orwell, the figure quoted by other writers, has become a substitute for doing just that." David Ulin, associate professor of English, stated that "Orwellian" has become a general term for repression and noted the irony of Orwell being used as "a rhetorical tool for the people who would have been at the point of his lance". The use of the term as an eponym was critiqued by Steven Poole who noted that it does not advocate Orwell's vision in the traditional sense: "It's as if we were to use Shakespearean to mean 'approving of rape, murder, and cannibalism', simply because such things happen in Titus Andronicus. Jennifer Szalai commented that the prolific use of "Orwellian" is tied to Orwell's noble public image as a staunch socialist who did not align with the extremes of the political right or left. Orwell biographer Dorian Lynskey wrote: "To quote Orwell was to assume, deservingly or not, some of his moral prestige."

== Influence ==
The New York Times said that the term is "the most widely used adjective derived from the name of a modern writer", being more common than other terms like "Kafkaesque", "Hemingwayesque", "Dickensian" and "Machiavellian".

== Use in popular culture ==
The Welsh rock band Manic Street Preachers used the term as the title of their song "Orwellian" in 2021, featuring the lyrics "We live in Orwellian times".

== See also ==
- Alternative facts
- Bibliography of George Orwell
- Brainwashing
- Doublespeak Award
- Indoctrination
- Mass surveillance
- One-party state
- Police brutality
- Police state
- Political prisoner
