= All or Nothing (Fiction Factory song) =

"All Or Nothing"

Single by Fiction Factory

from the album Throw the Warped Wheel Out
- B-side: "Dreaming of Someone"
- Released: May 1984
- Genre: New wave
- Length: 3:49
- Label: CBS
- Songwriters: Kevin Patterson, Eddie Jordan, Chic Medley
- Producer: Alan Rankine

Fiction Factory singles chronology
"(Feels Like) Heaven" (1983)	"All Or Nothing" (1984)	"Not the Only One" (1985)

"All or Nothing" is a song by the Scottish new wave band Fiction Factory, released in 1984 as the third and final single from the band's debut album, Throw the Warped Wheel Out. The song was written by Kevin Patterson, Eddie Jordan and Chic Medley. It was produced by Alan Rankine.

== Background ==
After the early 1984 top 10 UK hit with "(Feels Like) Heaven", the follow-up, a reissue of debut single "Ghost of Love", only managed to reach No. 64 in the UK. The band became labelled as a one-hit wonder, as their following releases failed to reach commercial success. "All or Nothing" was released with little interest from record buyers, and it failed to make an appearance within the UK top 100. This was despite the song receiving acclaim from music journalists as a stand-out track from the band's debut album. The song was released with limited promotion, with the single not having a music video, unlike the previous two singles.

== Release ==
The single was released via 7" and 12" vinyl in the UK. A 7" single was also issued in the Netherlands. All releases were through CBS Records, who also distributed the release. A promotional 7" vinyl was released in the UK as well.

The 7" vinyl featured the exclusive non-album B-Side "Dreaming of Someone" - a song written by Patterson and Jordan, and produced by Fiction Factory. The 12" vinyl release featured an "Extended Version" of "All or Nothing", along with "Dreaming of Someone" and another exclusive, non-album B-side, "I Who Know You". This song was also written by Patterson and Jordan, and produced by Fiction Factory. Peter Wilson, who produced the majority of the band's debut album, mixed the track.

The single featured a full colour sleeve, featuring similar artwork as the band's debut album - a close up of Patterson in silhouette, with a glowing effect amongst a black backdrop. The photography was taken by David McIntyre in his own parent's garden. The effect was achieved by McIntyre drawing Patterson's outline on a piece of cardboard. A couple of days later they then took a camera, the exposure and the cardboard outline to a local place called "The Hermitage" – close to Perth – where Europe's tallest tree stands. The cardboard piece was positioned close to the tree, and then McIntyre did the second part of the exposure while walking about with a torch doing all the lights off Patterson.

Following the song's release on the Throw the Warped Wheel Out album, and as a single, the song was later included on the band's only compilation album Feels Like Heaven, released in Europe during 1999 via Sony Music Entertainment. "I Who Know You" also appeared on the compilation.

== Track listings ==
7" single

1. "All or Nothing" - 3:49
2. "Dreaming of Someone" - 3:32

12" single

1. "All or Nothing" (extended version) - 4:58
2. "Dreaming of Someone" - 3:27
3. "I Who Know You" - 4:34

== Critical reception ==
On its release as a single, Jerry Smith of Music Week described it as "slick pop" and wrote, "This has a commercial sound, with its funky bass and very Martin Fry type vocals punctuated by an intricate keyboard arrangement." Karen Swayne of Record Mirror described it as "another offering from one of the most anonymous of the recent crop of faceless bands cluttering up the charts". She added, "I blame it on Radio One for encouraging them. As long as this kind of bland synthesised music is deemed ideal airplay fodder, there'll always be Fiction Factories churning it out." In a retrospective review of Throw the Warped Wheel Out, Michael Sutton of AllMusic said, "The slow groove of 'The Hanging Gardens' or the brisk, soulful melodies of 'All or Nothing' may not have the instant appeal of '(Feels Like) Heaven', but repeated spins uncover the finger-snapping hooks within."

== Personnel ==
- Kevin Patterson - vocals
- Chic Medley - guitar
- Graham McGregor - bass
- Eddie Jordan - keyboards
- Mike Ogletree - drums and percussion

=== Production ===
- Producer of "All or Nothing" - Alan Rankine
- Remixers of "All or Nothing" - Fiction Factory
- Producer of "Dreaming of Someone" and "I Who Know You" - Fiction Factory
- Mixing of "I Who Know You" - Peter Wilson
- Photography - David McIntyre

== Charts ==
Chart (1984)	Peak position
UK Singles Chart	148
