= Headful of Sugar =

Studio album by Sunflower Bean
- Released: May 6, 2022
- Genres: Indie pop; alternative rock; neo-psychedelia
- Length: 35:06
- Labels: Mom + Pop (USA); Lucky Number (Europe + UK)
- Producer: Jacob Portrait

Sunflower Bean chronology
Twentytwo in Blue (2018)	Headful of Sugar (2022)	Mortal Primetime (2025)

Singles from Headful of Sugar
- 1. "Baby Don't Cry" Released: October 13, 2021; 2. "Who Put You Up To This?" Released: February 8, 2022; 3. "Roll The Dice" Released: March 7, 2022; 4. "I Don't Have Control Sometimes" Released: April 6, 2022; 5. "In Flight" Released: May 5, 2022

Professional ratings
Review scores
Source	Rating
Metacritic	76/100
Clash	8/10
AllMusic	4.5/5 stars
Dork	5/5 stars
The Line of Best Fit	8/10
NME	4/5 stars
Under the Radar	8.5/10
Loud and Quiet	4/10
Buzz	3/5 stars

Headful of Sugar is the third studio album by New York rock band Sunflower Bean. It was released on May 6, 2022, by Lucky Number Records in Europe and the UK, and Mom + Pop Music in the USA in vinyl, CD and digital formats. It was mostly written by band members Julia Cumming and Nick Kivlen, Jack Faber, and Jacob Portrait. Portrait also produced the album.

== Background ==
On October 9, 2021 a post was made on the Sunflower Bean official instagram account announcing their new single Baby Don't Cry, as well as the ability to pre-save it on streaming sites. The song was released on October 13, 2021, at the same time as the announcement of a 2021/2022 US and UK tour, and the release of pre-sale sign-up for tickets. The same day the song won Hottest Record In The World on Clara Amfo's Future Sounds on BBC Radio 1.

On February 3-7, 2022, the Sunflower Bean instagram account released a series of criptic posts featuring shots of the band members from the set of the music video of Who Put You Up To This? and text "who put you up to this?" and what would be the release day and date of the single and music video. Both were released on February 8, 2022, and at the same time Sunflower Bean officially announced their new album Headful of Sugar, as well as the pre-sale for their tour, through an instagram post. The music video for Who Put You Up To This? is the first part of a storyline, which showed a character played by Cumming transporting money for a criminal organisation, stealing a large portion of it, and evading the police. The video also showed lyrics from other songs from the upcoming album.

On February 28-March 6, 2022, the band made another series of posts teasing their next single Roll The Dice, revealing the release date, some lyrics from the song, and announcing there will be a music video alongside it. On March 6, 2022 it was announced that the band once again won Hottest Record In The World on Amfo's Future Sounds for Roll The Dice, and that the song would be premiering on the show on March 7, 2022. The music video was the second and final part of the storyline that started in the Who Put You Up To This? music video, and showed the friends of Cumming's character stealing the money she got in the first part, and Cumming tracking them down and fighting to get it back.

The band had been on tour throughout the rollout of the singles of this album, and had been performing singles and unreleased songs from the upcoming album. On April 1, 2022, the band announced their next single in a post alongside a clip from their tour of a performance of the song. I Don't Have Control Sometimes was then released on April 6, 2022, alongside a music video, showing a story of a person who has infinite bad luck after finding a Sunflower Bean t-shirt.

The band continued to promote the upcoming album on their instagram, revealing the tracklist and more lyrics, showcasing the vinyl edition of the album, and were interviewed by many magazines, including Rolling Stone. On April 29, 2022, the band revealed the final single, In Flight, would be releasing on May 5, and the album would be releasing the next day. A music video for the song was released alongside it, showing Kivlen crashing his car and running into Cumming and Faber, and the three playing the song together.

The album was released on May 6, 2022. Throughout the next few months, the band released four youtube videos documenting the process of creating the album.

Moment In The Sun was initially released as a standalone single on September 17, 2020 during the Covid-19 lockdown. It was released alongside a music video, which showed 2 moments; Cumming stuck inside her house, and memories of a Summer with a lover. After the song's use in season 1 of Heartstopper, it gained massive popularity, becoming the band's most streamed song. When Headful of Sugar was released a month later the song was included as a bonus track on digital versions of the album.

== Track listing ==
Headful of Sugar track listing
No.	Title	Length
1.	"Who Put You Up to This?"	3:19
2.	"In Flight"	3:25
3.	"Otherside"	3:10
4.	"Roll The Dice"	3:14
5.	"Headful of Sugar"	3:28
6.	"I Don't Have Control Sometimes"	2:33
7.	"Stand By Me"	2:44
8.	"Post Love"	2:39
9.	"Baby Don't Cry"	3:57
10.	"Beat the Odds"	4:05
11.	"Feel Somebody"	2:27
Total length:		35:06

Digital edition bonus track
No.	Title	Length
12.	"Moment in the Sun"	3:09
Total length:		38:16

Notes

- All track titles are stylized in capital case except for Headful of Sugar, which is in title case.

== Personnel ==
Sunflower Bean members

- Julia Cumming: Vocals (tracks 1-9, 11-12), Bass (all tracks), Writer (all tracks)
- Nick Kivlen: Vocals (tracks 2, 4, 5, 10), Guitar (all tracks), Writer (all tracks)
- Olive Faber: Drums (all tracks)

Additional personnel

- Jacob Portrait: Writer (tracks 1, 2, 4, 5, 7, 8, 10, 11, 12), Producer (all tracks)
- Jack Faber: Writer (all tracks)
- Shamir Bailey: Writer (track 7)
- Suzy Shinn: Writer (track 7)
- Johan Lenox: Writer (track 8)
