= Mortal Primetime =

Studio album by Sunflower Bean
- Released: April 25, 2025
- Genres: Indie rock; indie pop
- Length: 35:12
- Label: Lucky Number
- Producers: Julia Cumming; Olive Faber; Nick Kivlen; Jake Sinclair

Sunflower Bean chronology
| Headful of Sugar (2022) | Mortal Primetime (2025) |

Singles from Mortal Primetime
- 1. "Champagne Taste" Released: January 28, 2025; 2. "Nothing Romantic" Released: March 12, 2025; 3. "There's A Part I Can't Get Back" Released: April 22, 2025

Mortal Primetime is the fourth studio album by American rock band Sunflower Bean. It was released on April 25, 2025, by Lucky Number Records in vinyl, CD and digital formats.

== Background ==
Succeeding the band's 2022 work, Headful of Sugar, Mortal Primetime consists of ten songs between three and four minutes each, with a total runtime of thirty-five minutes and twelve seconds. The first single and opening track, "Champagne Taste", was released on January 28, 2025, with a music video directed by Isaac Roberts. The second single, "Nothing Romantic", was released on March 12, 2025. The album incorporates elements of alternative rock, folk, and dream pop.

== Reception ==
Professional ratings
Aggregate scores
| Source | Rating |
|---|---|
| Metacritic | 88/100 |
Review scores
| Source | Rating |
| AllMusic | 4.5/5 stars |
| Dork | 4/5 stars |
| The Line of Best Fit | 7/10 |
| New Noise | 5/5 stars |
| Paste | 9.0/10 |
| Under the Radar | 8.5/10 |

AllMusic rated the album four and a half stars out of five and stated, "If you fell in love with Sunflower Bean's early indie-pop and marveled at their turn towards alt-rock cool, Mortal Primetime is the best of both worlds; an assured album of rock and roll magic, dusted with emotive pop pathos." Under the Radar assigned it a rating of 8.5 out of ten and remarked, "As a consequence Mortal Primetime doesn't shout; it unfolds. Each melody carries its own quiet weight, revealing a band attuned to the power of restraint and the elegance of a well-placed hook." Paste gave the album a rating of 9.0, describing it as "a record which casts aside the traditional rock-band impetus to choose an era, genre, and style of rock and roll's past to emulate—and instead embraces all of them." The Line of Best Fit scored the album seven out of ten and noted, "Mortal Primetime sees the rebirth of the New York trio; emerging from the shadows of winter to tilt their heads towards the brighter, more fruitful pastures of spring." New Noise, rating Mortal Primetime five stars, described it as a nod "towards the past with eyes towards the future", combining "the undoubtable twang of Gwen Stefani and synth pop sound of Tame Impala to create a sound wholly original." Dork rated the album four out of five and commented about its production, stating it "strikes a delicate balance between vintage warmth and modern clarity." DIY assigned it a rating of four and a half, "Across its ten tracks, the band abandon any fixed notion of genre, weaving together elements of alt-rock, folk, and dreamy, blissful pop with remarkable ease."

== Track listing ==
Mortal Primetime track listing
| No. | Title | Lyrics | Music | Length |
|---|---|---|---|---|
| 1. | "Champagne Taste" | Julia Cumming; Nick Kivlen | Cumming; Olive Faber; Kivlen | 3:12 |
| 2. | "Nothing Romantic" | Cumming; Kivlen; Grace Kelly | Cumming; Faber; Kivlen; Kelly | 3:34 |
| 3. | "Waiting for the Rain" | Kivlen; Oliver Hill | Cumming; Faber; Kivlen; Oliver Hill | 3:27 |
| 4. | "Look What You've Done to Me" | Cumming | Cumming; Faber; Kivlen | 3:00 |
| 5. | "I Knew Love" | Cumming | Cumming; Faber; Kivlen | 3:52 |
| 6. | "Take Out Your Insides" | Cumming; Kivlen | Cumming; Faber; Kivlen | 3:46 |
| 7. | "There's a Part I Can't Get Back" | Cumming | Cumming; Faber; Kivlen | 4:02 |
| 8. | "Please Rewind" | Kivlen | Cumming; Faber; Kivlen | 3:02 |
| 9. | "Shooting Star" | Cumming | Cumming; Faber; Kivlen | 3:41 |
| 10. | "Sunshine" | Kivlen | Cumming; Faber; Kivlen | 3:36 |
| Total length: | | | | 35:12 |

Deluxe version tracks
| No. | Title | Lyrics | Music | Length |
|---|---|---|---|---|
| 11. | "No Bills In Heaven" | Kivlen | Cumming; Faber; Kivlen | 2:33 |
| 12. | "Raggedy Anne" | Cumming; Kivlen | Cumming; Faber; Kivlen | 3:14 |
| 13. | "Lady Daydream" | Kivlen | Cumming; Faber; Kivlen | 3:25 |
| 14. | "Crashing Highs" | Kivlen | Cumming; Faber; Kivlen; Amanda Warner | 3:02 |
| 15. | "Watch You Walk Away" | Cumming; Kivlen | Cumming; Faber; Kivlen | 2:47 |
| Total length: | | | | 50:13 |

== Personnel ==
Credits adapted from Tidal.

=== Sunflower Bean ===
- Julia Cumming – vocals, bass guitar (all tracks); production (tracks 1–5, 7–10), piano (1, 6, 7, 9)
- Olive Faber – drums (tracks 1–7, 9–10), production (1–5, 7–10), vocals (4), engineering (9)
- Nick Kivlen – guitar (all tracks), production (tracks 1–5, 7–10), vocals (3, 4, 8), piano (7)

=== Additional contributors ===
- Jake Sinclair – production, engineering, percussion (track 6)
- Matt Colton – mastering
- Caesar Edmunds – mixing
- Sarah Tudzin – engineering (tracks 1–5, 7, 8)
- Roger Joseph Manning Jr. – piano (tracks 2–5, 7)
- Emily Elkin – cello (tracks 3, 5, 7, 8)
- Nigel Wilton – engineering assistance (track 6)

== Charts ==
Chart performance for Mortal Primetime
| Chart (2025) | Peak position |
|---|---|
| Scottish Albums (Official Charts) | 69 |
| UK Album Downloads (Official Charts) | 62 |
