= Twentytwo in Blue =

Studio album by Sunflower Bean
- Released: March 23, 2018
- Recorded: December 2016–December 2017
- Genres: Glam rock; indie rock; pop
- Length: 40:30
- Labels: Mom + Pop Music; Lucky Number
- Producers: Matthew Molnar; Jacob Portrait

Sunflower Bean chronology
Human Ceremony (2016)	Twentytwo in Blue (2018)	Headful of Sugar (2022)

Singles from Twentytwo in Blue
- 1. "I Was a Fool" Released: November 3, 2017; 2. "Crisis Fest" Released: January 12, 2018; 3. "Twentytwo" Released: February 23, 2018; 4. "Human For" Released: March 16, 2018

Professional ratings
Aggregate scores
Source	Rating
Metacritic	78/100
Review scores
Source	Rating
AllMusic	4/5 stars
The A.V. Club	B
Clash	8/10
Consequence of Sound	B
DIY	4/5 stars
Drowned in Sound	4/10
MusicOMH	4/5 stars
NME	5/5 stars
Paste	8/10
Pitchfork	6.4/10

Twentytwo in Blue is the second studio album by American indie rock band Sunflower Bean. It was released on March 23, 2018, under Lucky Number in the UK and Mom + Pop Music worldwide.

== Release ==
The first single "I Was A Fool" was released on November 3, 2017. Guitarist Nick Kivlen explained the song "seemingly crept up from nowhere and into our practice space. It was a special moment between the three of us, Julia and I both improvised the lyrics."

The second single "Crisis Fest" was released on January 12, 2018, along with the announcement of their second album.

On February 23, 2018, the third single "Twentytwo" was released.

The fourth single "Human For" was released on March 16, 2018.

== Critical reception ==
Twentytwo in Blue was met with "generally favorable" reviews from critics. At Metacritic, which assigns a weighted average rating out of 100 to reviews from mainstream publications, this release received an average score of 78, based on 20 reviews.

Tim Sendra from AllMusic said the band "don't pull any punches and the record has an immediate impact, both sonically and emotionally. About half the record sounds like the work of a road-tested, whip-smart rock & roll band," while noting the album fits "together perfectly; from the songs to the sounds to the performances, it's indie rock and pop at their thoughtful, searching, sweet, and punchy best." Alex McLevy from The A.V. Club said the album is "tighter in execution, broader in scope, and more pop-focused in nearly every way. Taken as a collection, it sounds like a jukebox full of lost ’70s hits." In a review published by Clash, Aurora Henni Krogh said "Sunflower Bean have found a maturity and a balance between lyrics and melody that infatuates. Though they sometimes still miss, 'Twentytwo In Blue' stakes out the loss of innocence that comes with growing up, and it does it beautifully."

=== Accolades ===
Year-end lists

Accolades for Twentytwo in Blue
Publication	Accolade	Rank
Blare	Blare's Top 50 Albums of 2018	36
God Is in the TV	God Is in the TV's 50 Albums of 2018	73
NME	NME's Top 100 Albums of 2018	4
Paste	Paste's Top 50 Albums of 2018	16

Mid-year lists

Publication	Accolade	Rank
NME	NME's Top 25 Albums of 2018 - Mid-Year	12

Decade lists

Publication	Accolade	Rank
NME	NME's Best Albums of the Decade	50

== Track listing ==
Twentytwo in Blue track listing
No.	Title	Length
1.	"Burn It"	4:18
2.	"I Was a Fool"	3:33
3.	"Twentytwo"	4:32
4.	"Crisis Fest"	3:31
5.	"Memoria"	3:42
6.	"Puppet Strings"	4:00
7.	"Only a Moment"	4:14
8.	"Human For"	2:23
9.	"Any Way You Like"	3:43
10.	"Sinking Sands"	2:32
11.	"Oh No, Bye Bye"	4:05

== Charts ==
Chart performance for Twentytwo in Blue
Chart (2018)	Peak position
US Independent Albums (Billboard)	16
US Heatseekers Albums (Billboard)	5

== Personnel ==
Musicians

- Julia Cumming – lead vocals, bass
- Nick Kivlen – guitar
- Olive Faber – drums

Production

- Joe LaPorta – mastering
- Jarvis Taveniere – engineer
- Matthew Molnar – producer
- Jacob Portrait – mixing, producer
- Rachel Cabitt – layout

== Release history ==
Region	Date	Label	Format(s)	Catalog
Worldwide	March 23, 2018	Mom + Pop	CD, LP	MP333
UK	March 23, 2018	Lucky Number	CD, LP	Lucky115
