= Another Story (Fiction Factory album) =

Studio album by Fiction Factory
- Released: 15 July 1985
- Genre: New wave
- Length: 36:22; 45:35 (CD version)
- Label: Foundry Records, Virgin, Instant Records
- Producer: Chic Medley; Kevin Patterson (assistant producer)

Fiction Factory chronology
Throw the Warped Wheel Out (1984)	Another Story (1985)

Singles from Another Story
- 1. "Not the Only One" Released: 25 March 1985; 2. "No Time" Released: 3 June 1985; 3. "Standing on Top of the World" Released: 1985

Another Story is the second and final studio album by the Scottish band Fiction Factory, released on 15 July 1985. The album was a commercial failure and featured no hit singles, despite the release of three singles during the same year: "Not the Only One", "No Time" and "Standing at the Top of the World".

== Background ==
Following the commercial disappointment of their 1984 debut album Throw the Warped Wheel Out, Fiction Factory underwent a major change in personnel, with keyboardist and writer Eddie Jordan, bassist Graham McGregor and drummer Mike Ogletree departing the band. Lead vocalist Kevin Patterson and guitarist Chic Medley were left as the two remaining members and, in turn, they used guest musicians for the recording of the second Fiction Factory album, including keyboardist Paul Wishart, guitarist Pim Jones, percussionist James Locke and bassist Graham Weir. Medley produced the album, with Patterson as assistant producer, and both wrote the entire album's worth of material either together or solely (except "Lose Your Heart in Nature" which also received a co-writing credit to Wishart).

The material for Another Story was written very quickly. Patterson recalled in 2022 that all of the songs he wrote or co-wrote were written in their basic form in about ten days. With Fiction Factory's departure from their original label, CBS Records, the duo recorded Another Story under their management's label, Foundry Records. It was recorded at the Planet and Castle Sound Studios in Edinburgh, and Amazon Studios in Liverpool. It was mixed at Castle Sound and Amazon Studios. Patterson recalled to François Zappa in 2022: "There wasn't really much of a budget [for the second album], but we felt we still had something to say that we thought people would want to hear. I guess it was more important to me that there was a record, rather than it doing well." Following the album's release, Fiction Factory disbanded.

== Release ==
Another Story was released by Foundry Records in the UK on 15 July 1985. It was released through Instant Records in Germany, Virgin in other European countries, Canada and the Philippines, and Centre Records in Australasia. The album was preceded by the lead single, "Not the Only One", which was released in the UK, Europe, Canada, South Africa and Australia. It was released in the UK on 25 March 1985. "No Time" was released as the album's second single on 3 June 1985 in the UK only and "Standing at the Top of the World" was released as the third and final single later in the year, but in Australasia only.

== Critical reception ==
Professional ratings
Review scores
Source	Rating
Record Mirror	1/5 stars

Upon its release, Andy Strickland of Record Mirror described Another Story as "an unspectacular affair" and "one of those slick, dull works that seem to appeal to balding A&R men and nobody else". He added, "Fiction Factory are trying to capture the old ABC sound and feel, but they fail miserably. 'Contractual Obligation', somebody whispers. I concur." He picked "Victoria Victorious" as the album's best track, "largely because of the great vocal hauntingly delivered by Fiona Carlin". Donald McRae of New Musical Express wrote, "Another Story is an example of the kind of product which is designed to blend in with the quivering nuances of an intimate sunset gathering. Fiction Factory play music for young and sensitive ideal home owners who suspect Dire Straits of being crazed petrol-sniffing existentialists."

== Track listing ==
No.	Title	Writer(s)	Length
1.	"Another Story"	Kevin Patterson, Chic Medley	2:45
2.	"Standing on the Top of the World"	Patterson	4:01
3.	"Not the Only One"	Patterson, Medley	4:02
4.	"All for You"	Patterson, Medley	3:11
5.	"Lose Your Heart in Nature"	Patterson, Medley, Paul Wishart	4:13
6.	"No Time"	Patterson, Medley	3:33
7.	"The Powder Room"	Medley	3:37
8.	"Make Believe"	Patterson	3:18
9.	"Time is Right"	Patterson, Medley	4:05
10.	"Victoria Victorious"	Medley	3:33

German CD bonus tracks
No.	Title	Writer(s)	Length
11.	"Not the Only One (Long Version)"	Patterson, Medley	6:11
12.	"Let Me Be a Part"	Patterson, Medley	3:02

== Personnel ==
Fiction Factory

- Kevin Patterson – lead vocals, performer, programming
- Chic Medley – guitar, performer, programming

Additional musicians

- Pim Jones – guitar
- Paul Wishart – keyboards
- Graham Weir – brass
- James Locke – percussion
- Marwenna Laidlaw – backing vocals
- Fiona Carlin – lead vocals on "Victoria Victorious"

Production

- Chic Medley – production, engineering
- Kevin Patterson – production assistance, engineering
- Calum Malcolm – engineering
- Pete Coleman – engineering

Other

- myIDEA – sleeve design
