= Café Jacques =

Scottish progressive rock band

- The Café Jacques band logo

Background information
- Origin: Edinburgh, Scotland
- Genres: Progressive rock
- Years active: 1973–1978, 2010–present
- Labels: Epic, Columbia
- Members: Chris Thomson; Chris Glen; Stuart Clyde; Davie (Hoo-Haa) Halley
- Past members: Peter Veitch; Mike Ogletree; Gordon Hastie

Café Jacques are a progressive rock band originally formed in Edinburgh, Scotland and most active in the 1970s. An early version of Café Jacques numbered seven musicians, but the most successful line-up was a trio, consisting of Chris Thomson, Peter Veitch (later with Penguin Cafe Orchestra), and Mike Ogletree (later with Simple Minds and Fiction Factory). They released two albums and a single on Epic Records (Columbia Records in the U.S.), produced by Rupert Hine, before disbanding in 1978. Café Jacques reformed in 2010, led by original member Chris Thomson.

== Recording sessions ==
The band recorded both albums at Trident Studios, London, and the trio was augmented by Geoff Richardson (at that time a member of Caravan, later with Penguin Cafe Orchestra), and John G. Perry (ex Caravan, Quantum Jump). Phil Collins played percussion on four tracks of the first album.

== Live TV performance ==
Café Jacques performed live on The Old Grey Whistle Test on 6 December 1977; hosted by Bob Harris.

== Discography ==
- 1977 - Round the Back
- 1978 - International
- 1978 - "Boulevard of Broken Dreams" b/w "None of Your Business" - 7" single
- 2011 - Lifer (Mini-album featuring current line-up; not on label)

== Original members ==
=== Band ===
- Chris Thomson - guitar, lead vocals
- Peter Veitch - keyboards, violin, accordion, background vocals
- Mike Ogletree - drums, lead vocals on Man in the Meadow, background vocals

=== Guests ===
- Geoff Richardson - viola, flute, clarinet
- John G. Perry - Wal bass
- Phil Collins - percussion

== Critical reception ==
Billboard described Café Jacques as having "a subtle ethereal feel, very progressive in content, both musically and lyrically." John Swenson in The new Rolling Stone record guide referred to them as an "excellent British studio band whose dense rhythmic mix and melodic keyboard textures recall Traffic's lyricism and Little Feat's syncopation."

== Recent history ==
Peter Veitch died in 1990. Mike Ogletree has lived and worked in Brooklyn, New York since 2006. He continues to work as a musician and his band Anacoustic Mind has released two albums:The Kilmarnock Edition and New Gold Dream (11,12,13,14). He regularly performs live with his band in and around the New York area.
