= The Ultra Vivid Lament =

Studio album by Manic Street Preachers
- Released: 10 September 2021
- Recorded: 2020–2021
- Studios: Rockfield, Monmouthshire, Wales
- Genres: Alternative rock, pop rock
- Length: 44:37
- Label: Columbia
- Producer: Dave Eringa

Manic Street Preachers chronology
Resistance Is Futile (2018)	The Ultra Vivid Lament (2021)	Sleep Next to Plastic (2022)

Singles from The Ultra Vivid Lament
- 1. "Orwellian" Released: 14 May 2021; 2. "The Secret He Had Missed" Released: 16 July 2021

The Ultra Vivid Lament is the fourteenth studio album by Welsh alternative rock band Manic Street Preachers, released on 10 September 2021 by Columbia Records.

Preceded by two supporting singles, "Orwellian" and "The Secret He Had Missed", the album features contributions from Julia Cumming and Mark Lanegan. It was received well by critics, and debuted at number one on the UK Albums Chart.

== Themes and music ==
The album represents a departure from their 2018 effort Resistance Is Futile. The album announcement made clear that the new record would avoid tackling the COVID-19 pandemic, with Bradfield clearly stating that doing that would just "add insult to injury". Furthermore, about writing in lockdown, James said: "The escape was literally checking to see that the world around you wasn't crumbling when you wrote a song. Lockdown had the element of a waking dream for a lot of people, especially the first one last year. Writing music was a way of pinching myself to say, 'There's still a part of life that works in the same way that it did, albeit in a strange way'". Wire shared that he coped well with this issue: "I'm a very patient and lonely person," he admits. "I can deal with isolation and have always embraced utter boredom quite easily. You see the tragedy and agony unfolding around you and it feels a bit glib to say something like that".

Another event that affected the process of making the album was the death of both of Wire's parents. Having been sick during the making of Resistance Is Futile, his father died in the summer after its release. Wire said: "Having the parents that I had is probably the greatest thing that ever happened in my life. I really liked them; I didn't just love them. I liked talking to them, I'd speak to them every day. They were highly engaged, important, funny people." He credited them with his best traits: "Rage from my dad, he was a mental and physical force. And from my mum, kindness and femininity, an appreciation of aesthetic and the bliss of just sitting down and watching TV together".

While Bradfield learned to play piano during the lockdown, Wire's approach to the lyrical side changed, becoming more introspective and personal: "The lockdown pushed me into facing my own horrors, rather than the horrors outside." The songs that emerged from those sessions, which make up the album "are internal galaxies, of exploration within myself. I think they're the most personal lyrics I've ever written." Also having to confront the loss of his parents, it "allowed me to go deep into myself", the loss "overhung the lyrics". Musically, Wire stated: "I think it's got traces of Lifeblood and Futurology, but I think it is a step into a new dimension. It's got the high modernism of Futurology and the underplayed, glacial power of Lifeblood. It's very much framed within ABBA's 'Waterloo' and Echo & the Bunnymen's 'Bring On the Dancing Horses'." He concluded: "I'm not going to pretend that we're reinventing the wheel in terms of modernity, but it's definitely framed within that era of time."

The band revealed that there were not many songs to pick from for the new record. Wire reflected: "If it didn't feel like it could be on the album, we were either dumping it or stowing it away so there's three or four. There's one James wrote called 'Eternalised' that he didn't think was up to the mark. The two extra tracks on the Japanese version of the album are really good actually. 'My Drowning World' in particular. There's one I wrote called 'Time of Reckoning' which didn't make the cut either. But we weren't writing masses and masses". Bradfield shared: "I knew I wanted to treat it like The Clash playing Abba. When something like that happens naturally, you have to latch on to it. There was no mission statement, no M.O. You get a clue that pulls you in the right direction. Nick had a couple more lyrics and he gave them to me and the ball started rolling. When you get an undercurrent that you know is going to drag you somewhere, somewhere you know could be very exciting, that's when you start." He said that the choice of title was easy: "I didn't know what the title was going to be until the second day of Rockfield, that's when Nick first mentioned it. I connected with it straight away, he showed me the artwork, I loved the figure staring out at the sea. It reminded me of The Truman Show nature of lockdown and what that was. Being trapped in this beautiful world, you couldn't touch, or couldn't stay for too long".

Wire summed up the process of making the album: "Everything has been chipped away at, but ourselves and by outside factors. With this album we looked at each other and realised that the only thing we've got left, the essence of the band, is creativity. It's the last thing that binds us together. We thought let's make the most of that. Let's cherish it".

== Release ==
The Ultra Vivid Lament was released on 10 September 2021 in standard CD format, deluxe CD, cassette and vinyl. The album managed to sell around 27,000 copies in its first week, entering at number one in the UK Albums Chart, it spent four weeks in the top 100 and it was the band's second number one album in the United Kingdom after 1998's This Is My Truth Tell Me Yours. The album also reached number one on the Official Vinyl Albums Chart, and number two on the Official Record Store Chart.

Elsewhere, the album debuted at number one on the Scottish Albums Chart, at number nine on the Irish Albums Chart and it charted within the top 40 in Germany, in Portugal and in Finland. The band announced an extended tour throughout the UK to support the new album, including events with profits going towards the NHS.

=== Singles ===
The first single, "Orwellian", was released on 14 May 2021. In an interview with The Quietus, Nicky Wire said that the song was the rejection of digital coercion, much like their previous 2010 song from Postcards from a Young Man, "Don't Be Evil", the single focuses on how the tech platforms overload information and lack the capacity for nuance that have fostered so many of people's insecurities, including Wire's. "Every time I put anything on, Peloton's just fucking staring at me. Or fucking Park Run. What happened to the loneliness of the long-distance runner?" The magazine goes further saying that "It raises a complex issue, and there are plenty of holes you could pick in Wire's arguments, yet it still feels articulate and focussed, the words in perfect step with Bradfield's pumping pop piano chords and bracing crescendo chorus".

The second single, "The Secret He Had Missed", was released on 16 July 2021 and is a duet with Julia Cumming. About the song, Wire shared that "It's about by how opposite their lives were. Augustus John was bohemian, reckless, amazingly talented but some might say wasted his talent. Then Gwen John was much more about the interior world, living an almost nun-like existence in France with very little possessions. It just goes to show how different it can turn out between a brother and sister." Musically, Wire says that "It's probably the most Abba-influenced track on the album, the piano track especially, it all came out really naturally. It's what we would call pop in our world – that glacial kind of controlled energy that comes out in something melancholic, but uplifting."

== Critical reception ==
Professional ratings
Aggregate scores
Source	Rating
AnyDecentMusic?	7.1/10
Metacritic	79/100
Review scores
Source	Rating
AllMusic	4/5 stars
Classic Rock	3.5/5 stars
DIY	3.5/5 stars
The Guardian	4/5 stars
The Independent	3/5 stars
The Irish Times	4/5 stars
The Line of Best Fit	7/10
NME	4/5 stars
Record Collector	4/5 stars
The Times	4/5 stars

The Ultra Vivid Lament received generally positive reviews from critics. On Metacritic, the album has a weighted average score of 79 out of 100 based on 14 reviews, indicating "generally favourable reviews".

NME gave the album four stars out of five, saying, "The record has its flaws – the odd misguided lyric, the occasional slip into by-numbers pop melodies – but there's plenty of space for those mistakes to be made... In the end, they are minor bumps in a record of intense beauty, among the best of the Manics' records this century". FMS Magazine noted the distinct move away from their previous output, with Jimi Arundell commenting "No longer seeking approval from either the masses or even their devotees, this latest release truly feels like the very first record they wrote entirely for themselves". Meanwhile, Louder Than War gave the album a score of 4.5 out of 5, writing, "Similar to This Is My Truth Tell Me Yours, which opened with the profoundly sad 'The Everlasting', The Ultra Vivid Lament begins by gazing into the rear view mirror". The review concluded, "We began by talking about this band's eternal need for relevance. Here, in 2021, thanks to the brilliance of The Ultra Vivid Lament, Manic Street Preachers remain as relevant as ever. They still matter. We are still talking about them. And if they do now intend to 'sail into the abyss,' they can do so safe in the knowledge that they always mattered. We have never stopped talking about them".

The Guardian also reacted positively to the album, reflecting that, "There are missteps amid the magic: with all the sparkling songcraft elsewhere, the crepuscular croak of Mark Lanegan sounds somewhat incongruous on 'Blank Diary Entry'. And the dig at 'those boys from Eton' on 'Don't Let the Night Divide Us' seems a little phoned-in for a band that once prided themselves on the sharpness of their lyrics". While among less positive reviews when compared to the majority, DIY stated that, "Musically, too, there's a sense of the trio reaching for a comfort blanket, turning back towards the intellectual pop that inspired them as youngsters in the '80s; the bright melodies of 'Quest for Ancient Colour' and 'The Secret He Had Missed' recall the likes of Roxy Music and Simple Minds. Such an approach helps sugar the pill on the avowedly topical 'Orwellian' and 'Don't Let the Night Divide Us', bringing home just how accurate the record's title is; The Ultra Vivid Lament is a requiem, but one that looks for sonic positivity in the thematic darkness".

The Quietus summed up the album by asserting that, "What the Manics have to offer is ultimately their own confusion. But that might be the only honest response to bewildering times. The Ultra Vivid Lament is an album which doesn't always know what it's saying. But it's saying it with an uncommon beauty". Concluding the review for AllMusic, Stephen Thomas Erlewine felt that band's performance was "No longer urgent yet still passionate" and that they "conjure a sense of operatic melancholy on The Ultra Vivid Lament that feels reassuring, even consoling."

As of October 2023, the album had sold 43,762 copies in the UK.

== Track listing ==
All tracks are written by Manic Street Preachers and produced by Dave Eringa.

The Ultra Vivid Lament track listing
No.	Title	Length
1.	"Still Snowing in Sapporo"	6:08
2.	"Orwellian"	3:49
3.	"The Secret He Had Missed" (featuring Julia Cumming)	3:39
4.	"Quest for Ancient Colour"	4:08
5.	"Don't Let the Night Divide Us"	3:42
6.	"Diapause"	4:59
7.	"Complicated Illusions"	3:23
8.	"Into the Waves of Love"	3:10
9.	"Blank Diary Entry" (featuring Mark Lanegan)	4:38
10.	"Happy Bored Alone"	3:09
11.	"Afterending"	3:52
Total length:		44:37

Japanese bonus tracks
No.	Title	Length
12.	"My Drowning World"	3:38
13.	"These Dark Roads"	3:54
Total length:		52:09

Deluxe edition bonus disc
No.	Title	Length
1.	"Still Snowing in Sapporo" (demo)	5:14
2.	"Orwellian" (demo)	3:49
3.	"The Secret He Had Missed" (demo)	3:39
4.	"Quest for Ancient Colour" (demo)	3:41
5.	"Don't Let the Night Divide Us" (Nicky Wire home demo)	1:05
6.	"Don't Let the Night Divide Us" (demo)	3:39
7.	"Diapause" (demo)	5:02
8.	"Complicated Illusions" (Nicky Wire home demo)	1:19
9.	"Complicated Illusions" (demo)	3:10
10.	"Into the Waves of Love" (demo)	3:10
11.	"Blank Diary Entry" (demo)	4:44
12.	"Happy Bored Alone" (demo)	3:17
13.	"Afterending" (demo)	4:03
Total length:		45:52

== Personnel ==
Manic Street Preachers

- James Dean Bradfield – vocals, guitar, piano
- Nicky Wire – bass guitar
- Sean Moore – drums, percussion

Additional musicians

- Julia Cumming – co-lead vocals (3)
- Mark Lanegan – co-lead vocals (9)
- Cat Southall – backing vocals
- Wayne Murray – additional backing vocals
- Nick Nasmyth – keyboards
- Bernard Kane – string arrangements
- Gavin Fitzjohn – additional guitar and keyboards; co-production (1 & 9)

Technical personnel

- Dave Eringa – production, engineering, additional keyboards; mixing (1)
- Jack Boston, Jake Faber, Loz Williams, Tony O'Flaherty – additional engineering
- David Wrench – mixing, additional programming
- Grace Banks – mix assistance
- Matt Colton – mastering
- Nicky Wire – all photography, design concept
- James Isaacs / Black Finch Design – design

== Charts ==
Chart performance for The Ultra Vivid Lament
Chart (2021)	Peak position
Austrian Albums (Ö3 Austria)	47
Belgian Albums (Ultratop Flanders)	62
Belgian Albums (Ultratop Wallonia)	139
Finnish Albums (Suomen virallinen lista)	39
German Albums (Offizielle Top 100)	12
Irish Albums (Official Charts)	9
Japan Hot Albums (Billboard Japan)	88
Japanese Albums (Oricon)	58
Portuguese Albums (AFP)	26
Scottish Albums (Official Charts)	1
Spanish Albums (Promusicae)	47
Swiss Albums (Schweizer Hitparade)	46
UK Albums (Official Charts)	1
