= Fiction Factory =

Scottish new wave band

- Fiction Factory during the mid–1980s

Background information
- Origin: Perth, Scotland
- Genres: New wave; synth-pop
- Years active: 1982–1987; 2007; 2011; 2022
- Labels: CBS; Virgin
- Past members: Eddie Jordan; Graham McGregor; Chic Medley; Mike Ogletree; Kevin Patterson; Grant Taylor; Paul Wishart

Fiction Factory were a Scottish new wave band from Perth. Formed in 1982, they are best known for their single "(Feels Like) Heaven", which peaked at No. 6 on the UK singles chart. The band originated from members of the ska group the Rude Boys, with the core lineup consisting of Kevin Patterson (vocals), Eddie Jordan (keyboards), Chic Medley (guitar), Graham McGregor (bass guitar), and Mike Ogletree (drums). Fiction Factory’s sound combined melodic synthesizer textures with introspective lyrics, characteristic of early 1980s new wave music.

Their debut studio album, Throw the Warped Wheel Out (1984), received moderate critical attention but did not replicate the commercial success of their debut single. A follow-up studio album, Another Story (1985), failed to chart significantly, leading to the band's subsequent dissolution.

== History ==
=== Breakthrough (1982–1987) ===
Before they began Fiction Factory in 1982, Kevin Patterson (vocals) and Eddie Jordan (keyboards) had played in the band Street People around 1978, performing original songs and covers of Magazine and Ultravox! songs, before forming ska band the Rude Boys (later shortened to the RBs) with Grant Taylor (trumpet) and Chic Medley (guitar). The eight-piece RBs played numerous live gigs, released an album and two singles, but due to musical differences Patterson, Jordan and Medley left the band to form Fiction Factory. Initially thought of as a song writing unit for other artists, they eventually enlisted Graham McGregor (bass guitar) and Mike Ogletree (drums and percussion), the latter being a former member of Simple Minds and Café Jacques, to form a proper band. Influences on Fiction Factory included Magazine, Kraftwerk, and Orchestral Manoeuvres in the Dark (OMD), the last of whom Patterson described as "a big favourite". Patterson's vocal style was influenced by the Walker Brothers, Sparks, and Magazine's Howard Devoto.

The band frequented Bandwagon Music Supplies in Perth. "They would come into my shop wanting to hear their recording on my wee cassette recorder that turned out to be a number six single that still gets played today," said Pete Caban, the shop's owner. "I still see the guys, they still come in." The shop closed in 2020 after 37 years in business.

The band's single "(Feels Like) Heaven" became a UK Top 10 hit in 1984 (also reaching the Top 10 in Belgium, Germany, Italy, Ireland and Switzerland); it was their only success in the UK. The follow-up single "Ghost of Love" only reached no. 64 on the singles chart, while the parent studio album Throw the Warped Wheel Out did not reach the chart at all. Fiction Factory had more success in Europe with "(Feels Like) Heaven" reaching no. 2 in Switzerland and the Top 20 in several countries, "Ghost of Love" spending 11 weeks on the German singles chart and Throw the Warped Wheel Out charting in Switzerland (no. 23), Sweden (no. 34) and Germany (no. 57).

In 1984 Fiction Factory toured Europe as support for OMD, but the same year Jordan, McGregor and Ogletree departed from the band. Patterson and Medley recorded the next studio album with session musicians, including keyboardist Paul Wishart and brothers Graham and Neil Weir of OMD.

=== Another Story and split (1987–2011) ===
Fiction Factory disbanded in 1987 after the release of their second studio album Another Story had become a commercial flop. Patterson formed the short lived duo The Dearhearts with singer Karen Smyth and left the music industry soon afterwards. He now works in IT and is married with two children. Patterson and Jordan reunited to perform "(Feels Like) Heaven" with a backing band at the latter's wedding in August 2007. Medley went on to work with the Scottish world music project, Mouth Music.

=== Re–unions (2011, 2022) ===
In 2011, the original line-up reformed for the first time since 1984 for their performance at that year's Rewind Festival. In 2016, Manic Street Preachers covered "(Feels Like) Heaven" for the album BBC Radio 2 Sounds of the 80s, Volume 2.

In 2022, Fiction Factory reunited and performed at the Belgian "W-Festival" in Ostend.

== Discography ==
Fiction Factory discography
- Studio albums: 2
- Singles: 6

=== Studio albums ===
Title	Album details	Peak chart positions			
Title	Album details	CAN	GER	SWE	SWI
Throw the Warped Wheel Out	Released: 1984; Label: Columbia	98	57	34	23
Another Story	Released: 1985; Label: Virgin	—	—	—	—
"—" denotes items that did not chart or were not released in that territory.

=== Singles ===
Year	Title	Peak chart positions											Certifications	Album
Year	Title	UK	AUS	AUT	BEL	GER	IRE	ITA	NED	NZ	SWE	SWI	Certifications	Album
1983	"Ghost of Love"	64	—	—	—	49	—	—	—	—	—	—		Throw the Warped Wheel Out
1983	"(Feels Like) Heaven"	6	51	20	10	10	4	33	16	24	14	2	BPI: Silver	Throw the Warped Wheel Out
1984	"All or Nothing"	148	—	—	—	—	—	—	—	—	—	—		Throw the Warped Wheel Out
1985	"Not the Only One"	—	—	—	—	—	—	—	—	—	—	—		Another Story
1985	"No Time"	—	—	—	—	—	—	—	—	—	—	—		Another Story
1985	"Standing at the Top of the World"	—	—	—	—	—	—	—	—	—	—	—		Another Story
"—" denotes items that did not chart or were not released in that territory.

== Band members ==
- Kevin Patterson – vocals (1982–1987, 2007, 2011, 2022)
- Chic (Charles) Medley – guitars (1982–1987, 2011, 2022)
- Graham McGregor – bass guitar (1982–1984, 2011)
- Eddie (Edward) Jordan – keyboards (1982–1984, 2007, 2011, 2022)
- Mike Ogletree – drums and percussion (1982–1984, 2011, 2022)
- Grant Taylor – trumpet (1983–1984) (played on first studio album)
- Paul Wishart – keyboards (1985–1987) (played on second studio album)
- Graham Weir – trombone (1985) (played on first and second studio album)
- Neil Weir – trumpet (1985) (played on first and second studio album)
- James Locke – drums and percussions (1985) (played on second studio album)
- Pim Jones – guitar (1985) (played on second studio album)
- Marwenna Laidlaw – (1985) (backing vocalist on second studio album)
- Fiona Carlin – (1985) (sang on second studio album)
- Bill Montague – bass guitar (2022)
- Leon Thorne – guitar and saxophone (2022)
