= The June Brides =

UK musical group

- Origin: South East London, England
- Genres: Indie pop
- Years active: 1983–1986, 2012–present
- Labels: The Pink Label; In-Tape; Occultation; Slumberland
- Members: Phil Wilson; Simon Beesley; Frank Sweeney; Jon Hunter; Arash Torabi; Steve Beswick
- Past members: Ade Carter (1983–86); Brian Alexis (1983–84); Chris Nineham (1983); Dave Bickley (1985–86); Andy Fonda (2012)

The June Brides are an English indie pop group, formed in London in 1983, by Phil Wilson and Simon Beesley of International Rescue. Influenced by Postcard-label bands such as Josef K and punk-era bands such as Buzzcocks, The Desperate Bicycles and The Television Personalities, their mix of guitar pop with viola and trumpet formed a blueprint for many of the indie pop bands that would follow.

== History ==
After forming in June 1983, they first played live as a band in August that year, soon attracting the attention of future Creation Records boss Alan McGee, who gave them several gigs at the 'Living Room', but reputedly decided not to sign The June Brides to his new label as it would have been "too obvious". Two Joe Foster-produced 1984 singles on The Pink Label, "In The Rain" and "Every Conversation" saw The June Brides receive much attention, and these two songs appeared frequently on compilation albums from that era. A year later, the mini-album There Are Eight Million Stories... appeared (produced by John O'Neill of That Petrol Emotion) and went straight to number one in the UK Indie Chart, staying there for a month. The album remained in the indie chart for 38 weeks. Disillusioned with Pink, the band moved to Marc Riley's In-Tape label for two further singles - "No Place Like Home" and "This Town" and, in 1986, opened for The Smiths on their Irish tour dates. The June Brides were asked to contribute to the NME's C86 compilation but declined for fear of being pigeonholed.

After losing confidence in In-Tape, they approached Go! Discs, who had offered them a deal the previous year, but with the band falling out of favour with critics and some of their early fans, Go! Discs were no longer interested. The band split in 1986, with singer Wilson embarking on a solo career on Creation Records.

In 2006, Sarandon paid tribute by naming their fourth 7-inch album The June Bride, which saw Phil Wilson guesting on vocals.

The band were also honoured in 2006 by a tribute album Still Unravished, released on Irish label yesboyicecream records, which featured covers by bands such as Manic Street Preachers, Television Personalities, The Tyde, Jeffrey Lewis and The Jasmine Minks. Dave Eggers and Everett True contributed liner notes for the album. Dave Eggers also wrote an article in the UK newspaper The Guardian, detailing his affection for the band.

On 23 January 2009, Phil Wilson, Simon Beesley, Jon Hunter and Frank Sweeney reformed The June Brides for a one off show at The Others, Stoke Newington, London.

In June 2012, the band reformed and released its first new single in 23 years via Slumberland Records and Occultation Records, followed by a second new single in 2014.

== Discography ==
Chart placings are from the UK Independent Chart.

=== Studio albums ===
- There Are Eight Million Stories... (Sep 1985, Pink, PINKY5 [LP]) - No. 1

=== Compilations ===
- For Better or Worse (Jan 1995, Overground, OVER40CD [CD])
- Every Conversation: The Story of the June Brides & Phil Wilson (2005, Cherry Red, CDM RED 273 [2CD])
- London, England 1984-1986 (2011, Social Music Records, SOCIAL-002 [LP])

=== EPs ===
- "In the Rain" / "Every Conversation" (Apr 1986, Pink, PINLY9 [12-inch])
- Peel Sessions (22/10/85) (Apr 1987, Strange Fruit, SFPS023 [12-inch]) - No. 29

=== Singles ===
- "In the Rain" / "Sunday to Saturday" (Jun 1984, Pink, PINKY1 [7-inch])
- "Every Conversation" / "Disneyland" (Sep 1984, Pink, PINKY2 [7-inch]) - No. 11
- "No Place Called Home" / "We Belong" (Nov 1985, In-Tape, IT024 [7-inch]/ITT024 [12-inch]) - No. 3
- "This Town" (May 1986, In-Tape, IT030 [7-inch]/ITT030 [12-inch])
- "A January Moon" / "Cloud" (June 2012, Occultation/Slumberland, PAN7DC015/SLR175 [7-inch])
- "She Seems Quite Free" / "I'm Undone" / "Being There" (October 2014, Occultation/Slumberland, PAN7DE032/SLR207 [7-inch EP]

=== Tribute albums ===
- Still Unravished - A Tribute to the June Brides - various artists (2006, Yesboyicecream, YBI01 [LP])
