= (Feels Like) Heaven =

Single by Fiction Factory

from the album Throw the Warped Wheel Out
- B-side: "Everyone but You"; "This Is"
- Released: 30 December 1983
- Recorded: 1983
- Genre: New wave; sophisti-pop; synth-pop
- Length: 3:34
- Label: CBS
- Songwriters: Eddie Jordan; Kevin Patterson
- Producer: Peter Wilson

Fiction Factory singles chronology
"Ghost of Love" (1983)	"(Feels Like) Heaven" (1983)	"All or Nothing" (1984)

Music video
- "Fiction Factory – (Feels Like) Heaven" on YouTube

"(Feels Like) Heaven" is a song by the Scottish new wave band Fiction Factory, released by CBS Records on 30 December 1983 as the second single from their debut studio album, Throw the Warped Wheel Out (1984). The track was a hit in Switzerland, reaching No. 2 on the singles chart. In the UK, it peaked at No. 6. It also reached No. 10 in Germany, No. 12 in the Netherlands, No. 14 in Sweden, and No. 20 in Austria.

The song was written by Kevin Patterson and Eddie Jordan shortly after they had formed Fiction Factory with Chic Medley. The lyric has been described by the band as "an anti-love song", while recognising that it has come to have a different meaning for different people.

The song was referenced in Ariel Pink's 2017 single "Feels Like Heaven".

== Background ==
Fiction Factory was formed in 1982 by vocalist Kevin Patterson, keyboardist Eddie Jordan and guitarist Chic Medley. The trio originally intended to write songs together for other artists rather than perform their own, but they received little record company interest until they formed a full band with the addition of bassist Graham McGreggor and drummer Mike Ogletree. "(Feels Like) Heaven" was written in 1982 and was one of the first songs that Jordan and Patterson wrote together. Speaking of the song, Patterson told Sounds in 1984, "I suppose to some it is milk pop and that was our intention – to write a commercial song that would get the companies interested. But it's not a very subtle song. It's not about loving somebody at all, it's about being loved by someone you absolutely despise."

== Critical reception ==
Upon its release, Ian Birch of Smash Hits wrote: "Imagine a smattering of H_{2}O, China Crisis and The Lotus Eaters with a clean-cut production. One to watch in '84." Tony Jasper of Music Week noted the song "has a fetching feel with a good blend of vocals and backing track". Frank Edmonds of the Bury Free Press gave the song an 8 out of 10 rating and described it as a "truly impressive and pleasing little number, with a relaxed, catchy melody". In the US, David Okamoto of The Tampa Tribune described it as "the song Spandau Ballet would kill for" and "one of the prettiest singles of the year".

== Track listing ==
7"

1. "(Feels Like) Heaven"
2. "Everyone but You"

12"

1. "(Feels Like) Heaven" (remix)
2. "Everyone but You"
3. "This Is"

== Charts ==
Chart (1984)	Peak position
Australia (Kent Music Report)	51
Austria (Ö3 Austria Top 40)	20
Belgium (Ultratop 50 Flanders)	10
Ireland (IRMA)	4
Netherlands (Dutch Top 40)	12
Netherlands (Single Top 100)	16
New Zealand (Recorded Music NZ)	24
Paraguayan Singles Chart	1
Sweden (Sverigetopplistan)	14
Switzerland (Schweizer Hitparade)	2
UK Singles (Official Charts)	6
West Germany (GfK)	10

== Certifications ==
Region	Certification	Certified units/sales
United Kingdom (BPI)	Silver	200,000^{‡}
^{‡} Sales+streaming figures based on certification alone.

== Dario G version ==
In 2003, the song was recorded by the English dance group Dario G, titled "Heaven Is Closer (Feels Like Heaven)". The single reached the UK top 40, peaking at number 39 on the UK Singles Chart. It also charted in several other countries across Europe. This version mainly uses the "heaven is closer" refrain at the end of the original song as its hook.
