= There Are Eight Million Stories... =

Studio album by The June Brides
- Released: September 1985
- Genre: Indie pop
- Length: 22:50
- Label: The Pink Label

There Are Eight Million Stories... is the album by the June Brides. It was released in September 1985 on the Pink Label.

== Track listing ==
1. "The Instrumental" (3:18)
2. "I Fall" (2:27)
3. "Sunday to Saturday" (3:11)
4. "Sick, Tired and Drunk" (2:01)
5. "Every Conversation" (3:09)
6. "Comfort" (2:19)
7. "Heard You Whisper" (3:05)
8. "Enemies" (3:04) (The Radiators from Space cover)
