= Throw the Warped Wheel Out =

Studio album by Fiction Factory
- Released: 1984
- Genres: Synth-pop; new wave
- Length: 38:10
- Labels: CBS; Columbia
- Producer: Peter Wilson

Fiction Factory chronology
Throw the Warped Wheel Out (1984)	Another Story (1985)

Singles from Throw the Warped Wheel Out
- 1. "Ghost of Love" Released: 1983; 2. "(Feels Like) Heaven" Released: 31 December 1983; 3. "All or Nothing" Released: May 1984

Throw the Warped Wheel Out is the debut studio album by the Scottish new wave band Fiction Factory. It was released in 1984 and included the UK and European hit single "(Feels Like) Heaven". The album failed to chart in the UK but was more successful in Europe, reaching the charts in Switzerland, Sweden and Germany. Alan Rankine of the Associates played the Synclavier, and produced the single "All or Nothing".

== Critical reception ==
Professional ratings
Review scores
Source	Rating
AllMusic	4/5 stars
Rolling Stone	mixed

Upon release, Rolling Stone stated: "Fiction Factory are doubtless a most sincere bunch, and here they display excellent musicianship, lavish production and a dozen moderately tuneful songs. Unfortunately, they lack any real spark of originality..." Michael Sutton of AllMusic retrospectively wrote: "Any interest in Fiction Factory's Throw the Warped Wheel Out will most likely originate from the album's opening track, "(Feels Like) Heaven" - an '80s new wave classic. However, one song cannot carry the weight of an entire LP; fortunately, Fiction Factory were talented enough to craft worthy successors. Throw the Warped Wheel Out is a vastly underrated album, disappointing only record buyers who want every track to sound like "(Feels Like) Heaven."

== Track listing ==
No.	Title	Writer(s)	Length
1.	"(Feels Like) Heaven"	Kevin Patterson; Eddie Jordan	3:32
2.	"Heart and Mind"	Patterson; Jordan; Chic Medley	3:07
3.	"Panic"	Medley	4:22
4.	"The Hanging Gardens"	Jordan; Medley	4:35
5.	"All or Nothing"	Patterson; Jordan; Medley	3:48
6.	"Hit the Mark"	Patterson	4:18
7.	"Ghost of Love"	Patterson	3:36
8.	"Tales of Tears"	Patterson	3:38
9.	"The First Step"	Patterson; Medley	4:56
10.	"The Warped Wheel"	Patterson; Jordan	4:18
Total length:			38:10

== Personnel ==
Fiction Factory

- Kevin Patterson – vocals
- Chic Medley – guitar
- Graham McGregor – bass
- Eddie Jordan – keyboards
- Mike Ogletree – drums; percussion

Additional musicians

- Graham Weir, Neil Weir – brass
- Grant Taylor – trumpet
- Alan Rankine – Synclavier

Production and artwork

- Peter Wilson – producer (1–4, 6–10)
- Alan Rankine – producer (5)
- Fiction Factory – remixing (4, 5, 10)
- Rosław Szaybo – art direction
- John Crancher – styling
- David McIntyre – photography

== Charts ==
Chart (1984–85)	Peak position
Canadian Albums Chart	98
German Albums Chart	57
Swedish Albums Chart	34
Swiss Albums Chart	23
