= Still Unravished =

Still Unravished - A Tribute to the June Brides

Compilation album by Various Artists
- Released: 27 February 2006
- Recorded: 2005 / 2006
- Genre: Indie pop, indie rock
- Length: 44:07
- Label: YBI01 Yesboyicecream
- Producer: Various

Professional ratings
Review scores
Source	Rating
Drowned in Sound	7/10 stars

Still Unravished - A Tribute to the June Brides is a tribute album to the English indie pop band the June Brides, consisting of cover versions of their songs. The liner notes were written by Dave Eggers and Everett True. The latter also features on the album, under the pseudonym 'The Legend!'.

== Track listing ==
1. "The Instrumental" - Manic Street Preachers
2. "Every Conversation" - The Positions
3. "In the Rain" - Lovejoy
4. "Sunday to Saturday" - The Starlets
5. "Heard You Whisper" - The Projects
6. "I Fall" - Television Personalities
7. "Sick, Tired and Trunk" - House of Mexico
8. "No Place Called Home" - The Mad Scene
9. "Josef's Gone" - Postal Blue
10. "On the Rocks" - How To Swim
11. "We Belong" - Bunny Grunt
12. "Heard You Whisper" - Tompaulin
13. "This Town" - The Legend!
14. "Waiting for a Change" - Jeffrey Lewis
15. "Pound for Pound" - The Tyde
16. "The Instrumental" - The Jasmine Minks
