= Orwellian (song) =

Song by Manic Street Preachers

Single by Manic Street Preachers

from the album The Ultra Vivid Lament
- Released: 14 May 2021
- Genre: Rock
- Length: 3:49
- Label: Sony
- Songwriter(s): Nicky Wire; James Dean Bradfield; Sean Moore
- Producer(s): Dave Eringa

Manic Street Preachers singles chronology
"People Give In" (2018)	"Orwellian" (2021)	"The Secret He Had Missed" (2021)

"Orwellian" is a song by Manic Street Preachers, released as the lead single from their 14th studio album, The Ultra Vivid Lament, on 14 May 2021, alongside a YouTube lyric video.

== Background ==
Announced as a departure from the sound of their 2018 previous effort Resistance Is Futile, the single tries to capture the essence of the new album, musically and lyrically. Wire stated that "the track is about the battle to claim meaning, the erasing of context within debate, the overriding sense of factional conflict driven by digital platforms leading to a perpetual state of culture war... It felt like the perfect sonic and lyrical introduction to The Ultra Vivid Lament".

The meaning of the song has been seen as political, much due to the social context in which the song was released, musically it echoes ABBA, Talk Talk and Fleetwood Mac. In an interview with The Quietus Nicky Wire said that the song was the rejection of digital coercion, much like their previous 2010 song from Postcards from a Young Man, "Don't Be Evil", the single focuses on how the tech platforms overload information and lack the capacity for nuance that have fostered so many of people's insecurities, including Wire's. “Every time I put anything on, Peloton’s just fucking staring at me. Or fucking Park Run. What happened to the loneliness of the long-distance runner?” The magazine goes further saying that "It raises a complex issue, and there are plenty of holes you could pick in Wire's arguments, yet it still feels articulate and focussed, the words in perfect step with Bradfield’s pumping pop piano chords and bracing crescendo chorus".

Later, on June 10 the band showed a new video, adding to the previous lyrical one, directed by Kieran Evans, about the video, the latter said that "For this album project, Nicky Wire and myself decided there should be more experimentation to the visual approach to both the promos and short films we have planned", concluding that "We’ve called this clip of 'Orwellian' a 'visualised' version because it's not strictly a promo, it’s much more of a visual interpretation of the song by me."

== Release ==
The song was released as a download on 14 May 2021. After its launch, The Guardian reported on the song, questioning if we do indeed live in Orwellian times. Giving a negative answer to this question it goes on to say that "People who ought to know better, including people who once sang about how “libraries gave us power”, have long used the word Orwellian as shorthand for a bit like Orwell’s Nineteen Eighty-Four”, finishing with "This is very much not the normal function of eponyms: after all, Orwell was not recommending that we adopt his Orwellian vision. It’s as if we were to use Shakespearean to mean “approving of rape, murder, and cannibalism”, simply because such things happen in Titus Andronicus. An Orwellian practice indeed".

About the song The Quietus stated that "it can be weaponised by the left and the righ", going further "taken in isolation – which is literally what happens when you release a single (especially an album's lead single) – it feels a little weak, a compromised response to extreme times. “It feels impossible to pick a side”, Wire writes (and Bradfield sings). Does it really, when the right are in the ascendancy? This equivocation smells like a cop-out. However, a reference to “the playing fields and exclusive clubs” does leave no doubt that the Manics have not forgotten who their real enemies are."

The Line of Best Fit wrote about the song: "Fingertips on the greater tonal range of a piano like on "Orwellian", where the almost gutsy succession of harmonies must have seen its birth on some ivory keys in some basement west of some big island in the North Sea."

== Personnel ==
Manic Street Preachers

- James Dean Bradfield – lead vocals, guitar, piano
- Nicky Wire – vocals, bass guitar
- Sean Moore – drums
