= Sunflower Bean =

American rock band

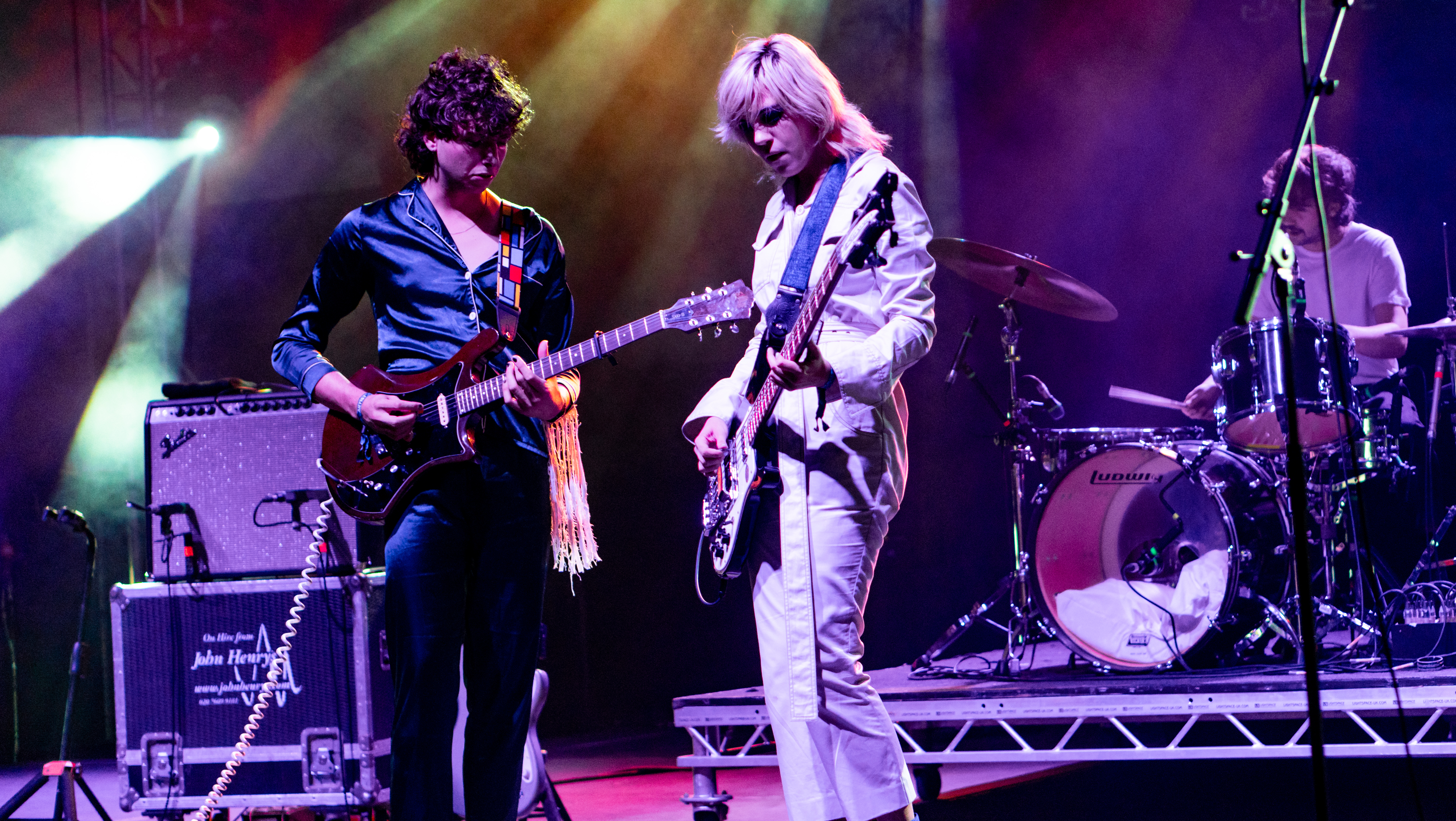
- Sunflower Bean performing in 2018

Background information
- Origin: Glen Head, New York and Brooklyn, New York, US
- Genres: Glam rock; indie rock; psychedelic rock
- Years active: 2013–present
- Labels: Fat Possum, Mom + Pop Music
- Members: Julia Cumming; Olive Faber; Nick Kivlen
- Website: sunflowerbeanband.com

Sunflower Bean is an American rock band from Glen Head, New York and Brooklyn founded in 2013. The band consists of Julia Cumming (bass, lead vocals), Nick Kivlen (guitars, backing vocals), and Olive Faber (drums). Their most recent album Mortal Primetime was released in April 2025.

== Career ==
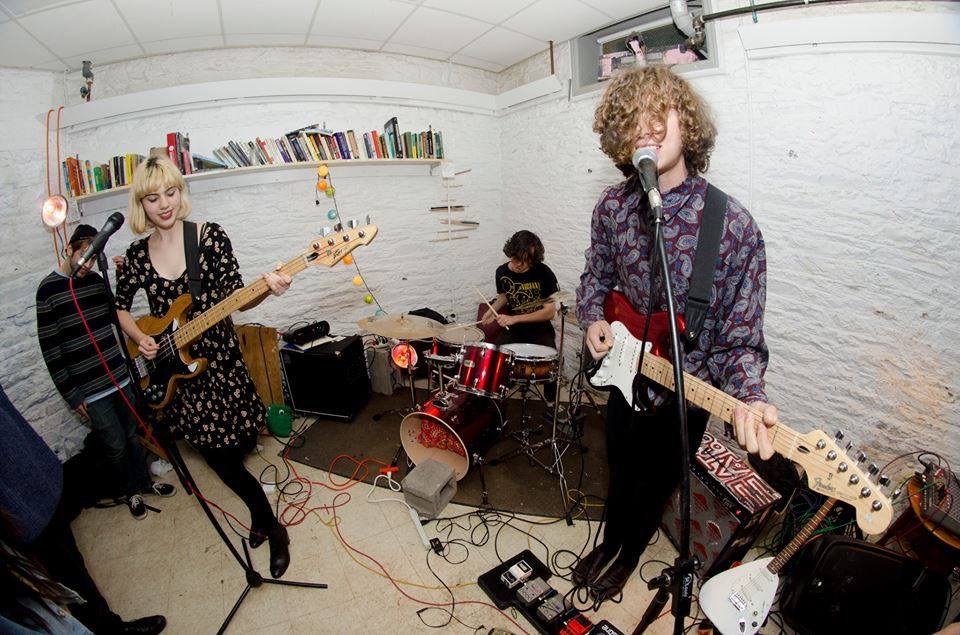
Julia Cumming, Olive Faber and Nick Kivlen rehearsing, October 2013

Kivlen and Faber were childhood acquaintances who both enrolled at North Shore High School in Glen Head, New York in 2009. They initially collaborated when Olive briefly subbed for the drummer in Turnip King, the band for which Nick was the bassist. By early 2013, the two began to create their own original music, practising and writing in Faber's basement. The name of their new band apparently came about due to Kivlen's obsession with sunflower seeds alongside Faber's concurrent love of coffee and coffee beans. The Manhattan-based Cumming, who had been performing in the band Supercute! along with Rachel Trachtenburg since 2009, met Faber and Kivlen at an early Sunflower Bean show; she agreed to join the band as bassist in August 2013, as Supercute! was dissolving. In the following year, the band moved from Long Island to Bushwick, Brooklyn, becoming active in the borough's thriving "DIY" scene, even as they felt ambivalent about much of the scene's aesthetic.

The band's appearance at the 2014 CMJ Music Marathon received good notices from All Songs Considered's Bob Boilen and from The New York Times's Jon Pareles, who wrote "New York is still home to bands as varied as Sunflower Bean, whose music suggests what might have happened if psychedelia had emerged after punk and the Police rather than before." They released their first EP, Show Me Your Seven Secrets, initially through their Bandcamp page on January 5, 2015, and later via Fat Possum Records. The EP, which features the singles "Tame Impala" and "2013", was called "astonishingly good" by the NME. (The band, fans of Tame Impala, had named a song after the Australian combo, noting that Tame Impala itself had named a song "Led Zeppelin".) Cumming provided a good description of the band's sound at the time to i-D: "We used to call it 'neo-psychedelia for the digital age', and now we've just been calling it 'night music', however someone may take that. It's like if Black Sabbath mixed with the Smiths, maybe?" The band toured relentlessly, gaining themselves the title of New York City's "hardest-working band" in 2014); they still tour extensively today, both as headliners and as openers for bands like Pixies, Wolf Alice, DIIV, Foxygen, Best Coast, Cherry Glazerr and Sleigh Bells.

After a successful series of performances at South by Southwest 2015, the band was signed to Fat Possum Records, and an inaugural 7" single ("I Hear Voices" b/w "The Stalker") was released on July 24. On November 12, 2015, they premiered the single "Wall Watcher" on The Fader, announcing also the cover art, release date and track list of their first album, Human Ceremony. The album, which had a more nuanced and pop-friendly feel than the band's earlier "heavy neo-psychedelia" recordings, was released on February 5, 2016, via Fat Possum Records. The album was recorded at Thump Studios in Greenpoint, Brooklyn in eleven days - produced by Matthew Molnar (formerly of the band Friends) and engineered by Jarvis Taveniere. The Fader wrote that Human Ceremony's "sounds are retro, but the lyrics grapple with the loneliness of contemporary existence"; Faber opined to the magazine that the album was "about the weight of being alive," while Kivlen wondered how alien civilizations would grapple with seemingly incomprehensible present-day human behaviors on Earth: "If there was an alien text book, there would be a picture, and the alien-language caption would just say, like, 'Human Ceremony'." Billboard's Joe Lynch wrote "Even though no one in Sunflower Bean is of legal drinking age, the Brooklyn indie trio's Human Ceremony is one of the most fully realized, sonically eclectic debut albums (everything from psych pop to stoner metal gets touched upon) in a minute".

"I Was a Fool", the first single released from Sunflower Bean's second album Twentytwo in Blue, debuted on NPR's "Songs We Love" series on November 3, 2017, distributed by Mom + Pop Music in the US and by Lucky Number Music worldwide. The album, released on March 23, 2018, was co-produced by Matthew Molnar and Jacob Portrait (of Unknown Mortal Orchestra), recorded at Thump Studios by Jarvis Taveniere, and mixed by Portrait. The band released a second single ("Crisis Fest") on January 12, 2018.

The band released an EP, King of the Dudes, on January 25, 2019 on the Mom + Pop Music label. The EP featured the single "Come For Me".

A single, "Baby Don't Cry", was issued on Mom + Pop on October 13, 2021. This song was included on the band's third full-length album, Headful of Sugar, which was released on May 6, 2022 on Mom + Pop.

The EP Shake is released on September 27, 2024, which is accompanied by a 14-minute performance based video directed by Isaac Roberts.

== Musical influences ==
Sunflower Bean's influences come from various genres and artists. The acts include Beach Fossils, Black Sabbath, the Byrds, Captured Tracks, the Cure, Devo, DIIV, Fleetwood Mac, glam rock, Led Zeppelin, Connan Mockasin, the Modern Lovers, Neu!, Nirvana, Pink Floyd, the Ramones, the Rolling Stones, Sex Pistols, the Smiths, Spacemen 3/Spiritualized, Sun Kil Moon, Talking Heads, Tame Impala, Tonstartssbandht, Total Slacker, T. Rex, the Velvet Underground, Unknown Mortal Orchestra, the Who, and Brian Wilson.

== Members ==
=== Current members ===
- Julia Cumming – vocals, bass (2013–present)
- Nick Kivlen – vocals, guitar (2013–present)
- Olive Faber – drums (2013–present)

== Discography ==
=== Studio albums ===
List of studio albums, with selected details and chart positions
Title	Details	Peak chart positions
Title	Details	UK
Human Ceremony	Released: February 5, 2016; Label: Fat Possum; Formats: 12" vinyl, CD, digital	—
Twentytwo in Blue	Released: March 23, 2018; Labels: Mom + Pop, Lucky Number Music; Formats: 12" vinyl, CD, digital	39
Headful of Sugar	Released: May 6, 2022; Label: Mom + Pop, Lucky Number Music	—
Mortal Primetime	Released: April 25, 2025; Label: Lucky Number Music	—

=== EPs ===
List of EPs, with selected details
Title	Details
Show Me Your Seven Secrets	Self-released: January 5, 2015; Fat Possum: October 16, 2015; Formats: 12" vinyl, digital
From the Basement (covers EP)	Released: September 9, 2016; Label: Fat Possum; Formats: 12" vinyl, digital
King of the Dudes	Released: January 25, 2019; Label: Lucky Number Music; Formats: Digital
Shake	Released: September 27, 2024; Label: Lucky Number Music; Formats: 12" vinyl, Digital

=== Singles ===
- "Bread" – released January 12, 2014 (self-released via Bandcamp)
- "2013" / "I Want You To Give Me Enough Time (demo)" – released March 17, 2014 (self-released via Bandcamp)
- "Tame Impala" / "Rock & Roll Heathen" – released August 15, 2014 (self-released via Bandcamp)
- "I Hear Voices" / "The Stalker" – released July 24, 2015 (Fat Possum Records)
- "Wall Watcher" – released November 12, 2015 (Fat Possum Records)
- "Easier Said" – released January 5, 2016 (Fat Possum Records)
- "I Was a Fool" – released November 3, 2017 (Mom + Pop/Lucky Number Music)
- "Crisis Fest" – released January 12, 2018 (Mom + Pop/Lucky Number Music)
- "Come For Me" – released October 30, 2018 (Mom + Pop/Lucky Number Music)
- "Moment In The Sun" – released September 17, 2020 (Mom + Pop/Lucky Number Music)
- "Baby Don't Cry" – released October 13, 2021 (Mom + Pop)
- "Who Put You Up To This?" – released February 8, 2022 (Mom + Pop)
- "Roll The Dice" – released March 7, 2022 (Mom + Pop)
- "I Don't Have Control Sometimes" – released April 6, 2022 (Mom + Pop)
- "In Flight" – released May 5, 2022 (Mom + Pop)
- "Champagne Taste" – released January 28, 2025 (Lucky Number)
- "Nothing Romantic" – released March 12, 2025 (Lucky Number)
- "There's A Part I Can't Get Back" – released April 22, 2025 (Lucky Number)

=== Videos ===
- "2013" – released March 16, 2014
- "I Want You To Give Me Enough Time (demo)" – released April 14, 2014
- "Tame Impala" – released October 1, 2014
- "Wall Watcher" – released November 12, 2015
- "Easier Said" – released March 9, 2016
- "Come On" – released August 9, 2016
- "I Was a Fool" – released November 3, 2017
- "Crisis Fest" – released January 12, 2018
- "Twentytwo" – released March 5, 2018
