= Ghost of Love (Fiction Factory song) =

Single by Fiction Factory

from the album Throw the Warped Wheel Out
- B-side: "The Other Side of Grey"
- Released: 21 October 1983 (first release); 24 February 1984 (reissue)
- Recorded: 1983
- Genre: New wave
- Length: 3:36
- Label: CBS
- Songwriter: Kevin Patterson
- Producer: Peter Wilson

Fiction Factory singles chronology
"Ghost of Love" (1983)	"(Feels Like) Heaven" (1983)

"Ghost of Love" is the debut single by the Scottish new wave band Fiction Factory, released by CBS Records on 21 October 1983. It appeared on the band's 1984 debut album, Throw the Warped Wheel Out, and was re-released as a single again on 24 February 1984 following the success of "(Feels Like) Heaven". It was the last charting single in the UK for the band, peaking at No. 64 in the UK Singles Chart. It was more successful in Germany spending 11 weeks on the singles chart, peaking at No. 49. It was written by lead singer Kevin Patterson and produced by Peter Wilson.

== Critical reception ==
In a review of the single's 1984 re-issue, Dave Rimmer of Smash Hits considered the song "distinctly dull". He wrote, "As with '(Feels Like) Heaven', what life it contains is in the chorus, but even that just sounds like ABC circa "Look of Love". Maureen Rice of Number One commented, "As soon as the first few bars are over, you know you've heard this somewhere before. I thought "Heaven" was a great pop single – but not so great that I'd buy it again speeded up a bit with a different title." Frank Edmonds of the Bury Free Press gave the song an 8 out of 10 rating and described it as a "very pleasing, melodic and attractive song, which should secure a second hit for the band".

== Formats ==
7" single

1. "Ghost of Love" – 3:36
2. "The Other Side of Grey" – 4:14

12" single

1. "Ghost of Love (extended mix)" – 5:16
2. "The Other Side of Grey" – 4:14
3. "Old Game Blue Flame" – 2:55

== Charts ==
Chart (1984)	Peak position
German Singles Chart	49
UK Singles Chart	64
