= Mike Ogletree =

Scottish musician (born 1956)

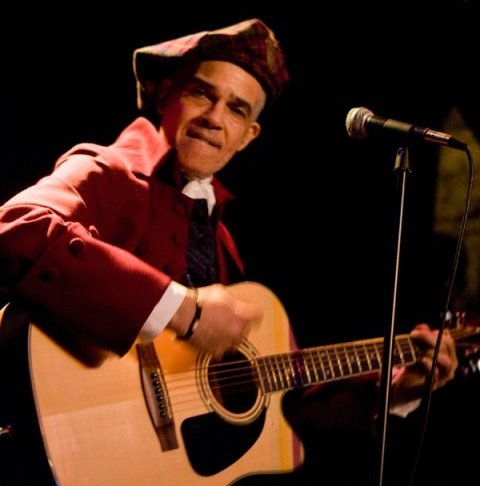
- Ogletree performing in 2010

Background information
- Born: 1 May 1956 (age 70); Kilmarnock, Ayrshire, Scotland
- Genres: Rock; post-punk; new wave; Americana
- Instruments: Drums; guitar; vocals
- Years active: 1977–present
- Labels: CBS; Sanctuary
- Website: http://www.immortalmemory.net/

Mike Ogletree (born 1 May 1956) is a Scottish drummer and guitarist of Afro-European descent. A founding member of the Scottish rock band Café Jacques, he is best known for his work in the new wave bands Fiction Factory and Simple Minds. He now lives and works in the United States, as well as performing occasional shows there.

== See also ==
- Fiction Factory
- Simple Minds
