= Julia Cumming =

American singer-songwriter

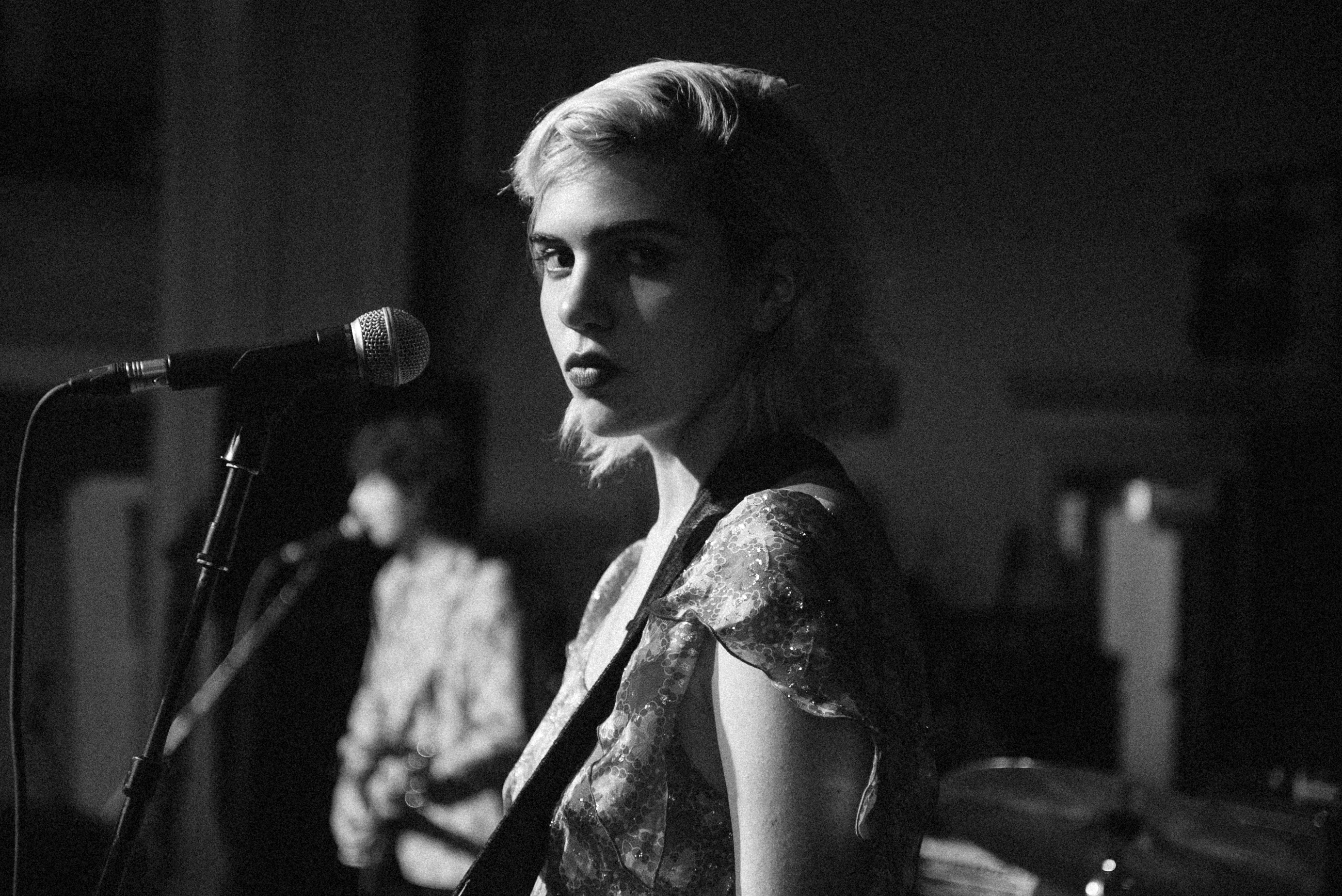
- Cumming on September 20, 2017

Background information
- Born: Julia Rachel Harden Cumming; January 16, 1996 (age 30); New York City, U.S.
- Genres: Glam rock; indie rock; psychedelic rock; indie pop
- Occupations: Singer-songwriter; musician; model
- Instruments: Vocals; bass; guitar; piano; ukulele
- Years active: 2009–present
- Labels: Partisan Records; Mom + Pop; Fat Possum Records
- Member of: Sunflower Bean
- Formerly of: Supercute!
- Website: Julia Cumming

Julia Rachel Harden Cumming (born January 16, 1996) is an American singer-songwriter who is the frontwoman and bass player of the Brooklyn-based band Sunflower Bean. Cumming models occasionally, including for several well-known designers, and appeared in global campaigns for H&M and Diesel. Cumming is also a political activist and is active in the Model Alliance. She has produced and directed a video featuring her fellow models, encouraging young people to become politically active. In 2021, she featured on the Manic Street Preachers song "The Secret He Had Missed".

== Early life ==
Cumming was born in Manhattan to Alec Cumming and Cynthia Harden, who (at the time) were a creative partnership as well as a marital one - writing, performing, and releasing songs in the alternative pop band Bite The Wax Godhead (1990-1998). Julia grew up in the East Village, Manhattan, attended New York City public schools, and started a band - Supercute! - along with neighborhood friends June Lei and Rachel Trachtenburg (of the Trachtenburg Family Slideshow Players) in 2009. Supercute!, a bubblegum-girl-group-psychedelic-pop amalgam, created (in Cumming's words) "ukulele rock operas"; the band lasted through 2013 with Cumming and Trachtenburg serving as their creative core. "It was almost an art project about not letting your age or being a girl stop you from trying anything," Julia told the New Musical Express in 2016. Cumming and Trachtenburg also co-hosted a talk show (Pure Imagination, 2011-2013), on the Progressive Radio Network, aimed at encouraging fellow teens to become involved in art and political action.

In 2014, Cumming graduated as a vocal music student at Professional Performing Arts School, made her acting debut in the movie short People Who Don't Know Me, and performed solo gigs with original musical material at local clubs. She also interned at the Museum of Modern Art, where she curated an off-site show about instagram art. There she met choreographer Dean Moss, who cast her for a leading role in his dance piece johnbrown, which debuted at The Kitchen on October 16, 2014.

== Musical influences ==
"When I was a really little kid," Cumming told The New York Times, "my parents had a VHS tape called 'Glam Rock.' It was about 15 songs of Gary Glitter, T. Rex and Alice Cooper, and I watched it every day until it broke." She has said that other influences include the Beach Boys and Brian Wilson, the Beatles, Devo, Fat White Family, Carole King, the Kinks, Cate Le Bon, Mr Little Jeans, Joni Mitchell, Kate Nash, the New York Dolls, the Plastic Ono Band, Iggy Pop, the Sex Pistols, Tina Weymouth and Talking Heads, the Velvet Underground, the Waitresses, and the Who.

== Sunflower Bean ==
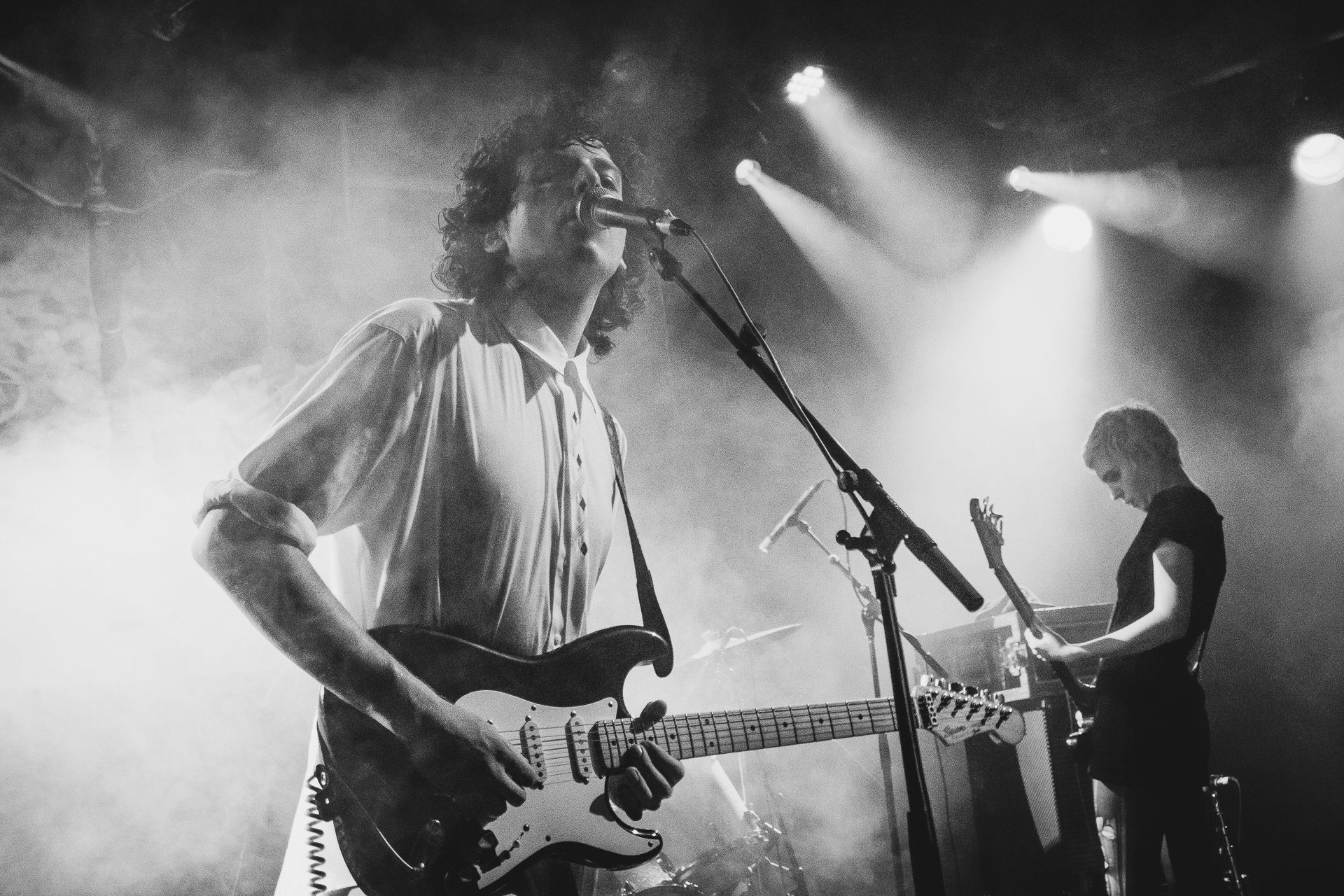
Cumming and Nick Kivlen performing with Sunflower Bean.

In August 2013, Cumming joined guitarist Nick Kivlen and drummer Olive Faber in Sunflower Bean, a power trio initially based in Glen Head, New York that had started off a spin-off of the band Turnip King. In the following year, the band moved to Bushwick, Brooklyn and became a part of the borough's thriving "DIY" scene, playing over eighty shows that year and earning themselves title of New York City's "hardest-working band of 2014". The band's appearance at the 2014 CMJ Music Marathon received good notices from All Songs Considered reviewer Bob Boilen and from The New York Times's Jon Pareles, who wrote "New York is still home to bands as varied as Sunflower Bean, whose music suggests what might have happened if psychedelia had emerged after punk and the Police rather than before."

The band recorded their debut EP Show Me Your Seven Secrets (initially self-released on January 27, 2015) and was signed to Fat Possum Records later that year. The album Human Ceremony was released on February 5, 2016, garnering largely positive reviews;

"I Was a Fool", the first single released from Sunflower Bean's second album Twentytwo In Blue, debuted on NPR's "Songs We Love" series on November 3, 2017. Twentytwo In Blue was released on March 23, 2018 by Mom + Pop Music in the U.S. and Lucky Number Music worldwide.

She has collaborated with other artists and appeared on the album The Ultra Vivid Lament by Manic Street Preachers in 2021.

== Solo career ==
On February 18, 2026, Cumming announced the signing of a contract with Partisan Records for the release of a solo album called Julia, released on April 24. On the same day, the single "My Life" was released at the same time as a music video directed by Edgar Wright, and her first-ever solo tour was announced with dates in New York, Los Angeles and Paris.

== Modeling career ==
Although Cumming had done occasional modeling jobs in the Supercute! era, her fashion career was bolstered in February 2014, when she was asked to walk in Yves Saint Laurent's Ready To Wear Fall Winter 2014 show in Paris. Saint Laurent's creative director Hedi Slimane signed the musician to an exclusive modeling contract, using her in three campaigns and in six shows for Saint Laurent; Cumming was frequently referred to as "Hedi Slimane's muse" in the press at the time.

Since then, she has modeled for Anna Sui, Elsa Schiaparelli, Max Mara, Rochas and Fausto Puglisi, appeared in global campaigns for H&M and Diesel, and was seen on the cover of Harper's Bazaar Kazakhstan and in many fashion editorials, most notably in many of Vogue's international editions (US, UK, France, Italy, Spain, Brazil, Mexico, Australia, Japan). In March 2017, Cumming appeared with Madonna for Vogue Germany in the news-making film and photo spread "Her Story", released on International Women's Day 2017.

== Political activism ==
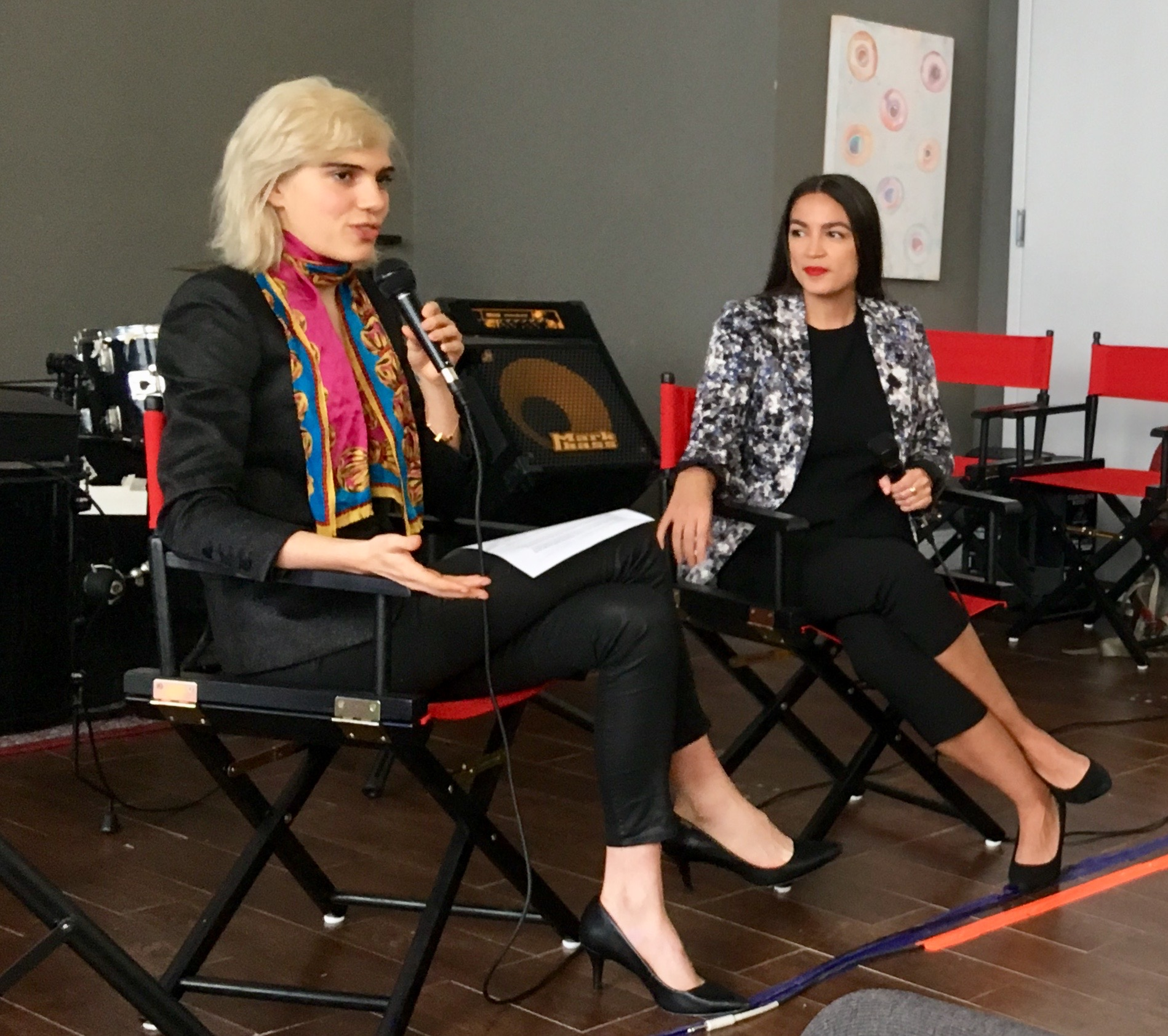
Cumming interviewing candidate Alexandria Ocasio-Cortez at an "Anger Can Be Power" event, 2017.

In 2017, Cumming founded Anger Can Be Power, a project that "endeavors to invoke the DIY spirit to inspire people to integrate political involvement in their lives"; she has hosted several public events dedicated to the topic of young people, particularly women, moving into concrete political action. Cumming is also active in the Model Alliance, and directed and produced a video featuring fellow models that encourages young people to directly call their political representatives. She interviewed Iranian-American singer Rahill Jamalifard (from Habibi) about her experiences as a volunteer Persian translator during the protests against Donald Trump's travel ban at John F. Kennedy International Airport.

== Personal life ==
As of 2026, Cumming is in a relationship with director Edgar Wright who was a fan of Sunflower Bean. Cumming made a cameo appearance in Wright's 2025 film The Running Man, and in January 2026 Wright directed the music video for "My Life", the first single of Cumming's debut solo album Julia.

== Discography ==
=== Studio albums ===
Title	Details
Julia	Released: April 24, 2026; Label: Partisan; Format: LP, CD, digital download, streaming

=== Singles ===
Title	Details
My Life	Released: February 18, 2026; Label: Partisan; Format: streaming
Please Let Me Remember This	Released: March 25, 2026; Label: Partisan; Format: streaming
Mom, I’m Going Back To Therapy	Released: September 18, 2026; Label: Partisan; Format: streaming
