= List of UK Independent Singles Chart number ones of 1995 =

These are UK Official Indie Chart number one hits of 1995.Complied by Music Week

Issue date	Song	Artist	Record label	ref
7 January	"Sweet Love"	M-Beat and featuring Nazlyn	Renk	
14 January	"Whatever"	Oasis	Creation	
21 January	"Whatever"	Oasis	Creation	
28 January	"Inbetweener"	Sleeper	Indolent	
4 February	"Inbetweener"	Sleeper	Indolent	
11 February	"Now They'll Sleep"	Belly	4AD	
18 February	"New Generation"	Suede	Nude	
25 February	"New Generation"	Suede	Nude	
4 March	"Waking Up"	Elastica	Deceptive	
11 March	"Waking Up"	Elastica	Deceptive	
18 March	"Wake Up Boo!"	The Boo Radleys	Creation	
25 March	"Wake Up Boo!"	The Boo Radleys	Creation	
1 April	"Wake Up Boo!"	The Boo Radleys	Creation	
8 April	"Save It 'Til the Mourning After"	Shut Up and Dance	Shut Up & Dance	
15 April	"Vegas"	Sleeper	Indolent	
22 April	"Love City Groove"	Love City Groove	China	
29 April	"Love City Groove"	Love City Groove	China	
6 May	"Love City Groove"	Love City Groove	China	
13 May	"Some Might Say"	Oasis	Creation	
20 May	"Some Might Say"	Oasis	Creation	
27 May	"Some Might Say"	Oasis	Creation	
3 June	"Love City Groove"	Love City Groove	China	
10 June	"Some Might Say"	Oasis	Creation	
17 June	"Sex on the Streets"	Pizzaman	Loaded	
24 June	"A Girl Like You"	Edwyn Collins	Setanta	
1 July	"A Girl Like You"	Edwyn Collins	Setanta	
8 July	"A Girl Like You"	Edwyn Collins	Setanta	
15 July	"A Girl Like You"	Edwyn Collins	Setanta	
22 July	"A Girl Like You"	Edwyn Collins	Setanta	
29 July	"A Girl Like You"	Edwyn Collins	Setanta	
5 August	"A Girl Like You"	Edwyn Collins	Setanta	
12 August	"A Girl Like You"	Edwyn Collins	Setanta	
19 August	"Girl from Mars"	Ash	Infectious	
26 August	"Hope St."	Levellers	China	
2 September	"Roll With It"	Oasis	Creation	
9 September	"Roll With It"	Oasis	Creation	
16 September	"Roll With It"	Oasis	Creation	
23 September	"U Girls"	Nush	Blanked Vinyl	
30 September	"Stay With Me"	Erasure	Mute	
7 October	"Stardust"	Menswear	Laurel	
14 October	"What Do I Do Now?"	Sleeper	Indolent	
21 October	"Where the Wild Roses Grow"	Nick Cave and the Bad Seeds and Kylie Minogue	Mute	
28 October	"Angel Interceptor"	Ash	Infecious	
4 November	The Move Your Ass EP	Scooter	Club Tools	
11 November	"King of the Kerb"	Echobelly	Fauve	
18 November	"Wonderwall"	Oasis	Creation	
25 November	"Wonderwall"	Oasis	Creation	
2 December	"Wonderwall"	Oasis	Creation	
9 December	"Wonderwall"	Oasis	Creation	
16 December	"It's Oh So Quiet"	Björk	One Little Indian	
23 December	"It's Oh So Quiet"	Björk	One Little Indian	
30 December	"It's Oh So Quiet"	Björk	One Little Indian	

== See also ==
- 1995 in music
