= Romeo Me =

1997 single by Sleeper

Single by Sleeper

from the album Pleased to Meet You
- B-side: "Cunt London"; "This Is the Sound of Someone Else"; "What Do I Get"; "When Will You Smile?"; "Motorway Man" (remix)
- Released: 24 November 1997
- Genre: Britpop
- Length: 3:43
- Label: Indolent
- Songwriter: Louise Wener
- Producer: Stephen Street

Sleeper singles chronology
"She's a Good Girl" (1996)	"Romeo Me" (1997)	"Look at You Now" (2018)

"Romeo Me" is a song by Britpop band Sleeper, written by the band's vocalist and guitarist, Louise Wener. "Romeo Me" was the second and final single released from Sleeper's third album, Pleased to Meet You, and became the group's eighth and last top-40 hit on the UK Singles Chart. It was also the group's last single until "Look at You Now" in 2018.

"Romeo Me" was originally titled "Romeo & Juliet", and the chorus lyrics reference the titular couple, Mark Anthony and Cleopatra as well as Marilyn Monroe and Joe DiMaggio, who feature on the cover art for the vinyl format. B-side "Cunt London" was the working title for the third album.

== Track listings ==
- UK 7-inch single
1. "Romeo Me"
2. "Cunt London"
- UK CD1
1. "Romeo Me"
2. "This Is the Sound of Someone Else"
3. "What Do I Get"
4. "Nice Guy Eddie" (Peel Session)
- UK CD2
1. "Romeo Me"
2. "When Will You Smile?"
3. "What Do I Do Now?" (Evening Session)
4. "Motorway Man" (Artic mix)

== Charts ==
Chart (1997)	Peak position
Scotland Singles (OCC)	39
UK Singles (OCC)	39
