= She's a Good Girl =

1997 single by Sleeper

Single by Sleeper

from the album Pleased to Meet You
- B-side: "Come On Come On"; "I'm a Man"
- Released: 22 September 1997
- Genre: Britpop
- Length: 3:23
- Label: Indolent
- Songwriter: Louise Wener
- Producer: Stephen Street

Sleeper singles chronology
"Statuesque" (1996)	"She's a Good Girl" (1997)	"Romeo Me" (1997)

"She's a Good Girl" is a song by Britpop band Sleeper, written by the band's vocalist and guitarist, Louise Wener. "She's a Good Girl" served as the lead single from Sleeper's third album, Pleased to Meet You, and became the group's seventh top-40 hit on the UK Singles Chart.

== Track listings ==
- UK 7-inch and cassette single
1. "She's a Good Girl"
2. "Come On Come On"
- UK and Australian CD single
1. "She's a Good Girl"
2. "Come On Come On"
3. "I'm a Man"

== Charts ==
Chart (1997)	Peak position
Scotland Singles (OCC)	24
UK Singles (OCC)	27
