= The It Girl (album) =

Studio album by Sleeper
- Released: 6 May 1996
- Recorded: 1995–1996
- Genre: Britpop
- Length: 45:59
- Label: Indolent
- Producer: Stephen Street

Sleeper chronology
Smart (1995)	The It Girl (1996)	Pleased to Meet You (1997)

Singles from The It Girl
- 1. "What Do I Do Now?" Released: 25 September 1995; 2. "Sale of the Century" Released: 22 April 1996; 3. "Nice Guy Eddie" Released: 1 July 1996; 4. "Statuesque" Released: 23 September 1996

The It Girl is the second studio album by English Britpop band Sleeper, released in May 1996. It was their most successful album, selling over 300,000 copies in the UK alone and featuring the top-20 singles "What Do I Do Now?", "Sale of the Century", "Nice Guy Eddie", and "Statuesque". The album was released internationally, with the US version having a different track listing and alternative photos in the liner booklet.

== Background ==
The album was recorded in London over the winter of 1995 and 1996 and production was helmed by Stephen Street.

Much of the content of the album is autobiographical. The song "Lie Detector" (whose lyrics include the album's title) was written about Wener's frustration with "how women are stereotyped and put into boxes, and not allowed to escape the way they were originally viewed."

== Critical reception ==
Professional ratings
Review scores
Source	Rating
AllMusic	4.5/5 stars
Alternative Press	5/5
Los Angeles Times	3/4 stars
Record Collector	4/5 stars
Vox	8/10

The album was well received by critics and helped solidify Sleeper's status as a key band in the Britpop movement.

Jack Rabid of AllMusic wrote that while "nothing is quite the total knockout of Smart's 'Inbetweener,' The It Girl is more consistently accomplished, with a broader palette of influences".

== Track listing ==
All lyrics are written by Louise Wener.

No.	Title	Writer(s)	Producer	Length
1.	"Lie Detector"	Louise Wener; Andy MacLure	Bruce Lampcov	2:31
2.	"Sale of the Century"	Wener; MacLure	Stephen Street	4:29
3.	"What Do I Do Now?"	Wener	Street	3:42
4.	"Good Luck Mr Gorsky"	Wener	Street	4:05
5.	"Feeling Peaky"	Wener; Jon Stewart; MacLure	Street	2:54
6.	"Shrinkwrapped"	Wener; MacLure	Street	4:46
7.	"Dress Like Your Mother"	Wener	Street	2:34
8.	"Statuesque"	Wener	Street	3:23
9.	"Glue Ears"	Wener; MacLure	Street	4:46
10.	"Nice Guy Eddie"	Wener	Street	3:20
11.	"Stop Your Crying"	Wener	Street	3:35
12.	"Factor 41"	Wener	Street; John Smith	2:58
13.	"Click...off...gone"	Wener	Street	2:52
Total length:				45:49

US edition
No.	Title	Writer(s)	Length
1.	"Feeling Peaky"	Wener	2:54
2.	"Sale of the Century"	Wener; MacLure	4:29
3.	"Dress Like Your Mother"	Wener; MacLure	2:34
4.	"Statuesque"	Wener	3:23
5.	"Nice Guy Eddie"	Wener	3:20
6.	"Stop Your Crying"	Wener	3:35
7.	"Lie Detector"	Wener; MacLure	2:31
8.	"What Do I Do Now?"	Wener	3:42
9.	"Shrinkwrapped"	Wener	4:46
10.	"Good Luck Mr Gorsky"	Wener	4:05
11.	"Factor 41"	Wener	2:58
12.	"Click...off...gone"	Wener	2:52

Japanese edition
No.	Title	Writer(s)	Length
1.	"Lie Detector"	Wener; MacLure	2:31
2.	"Sale of the Century"	Wener; MacLure	4:29
3.	"What Do I Do Now?"	Wener	3:42
4.	"Good Luck Mr Gorsky"	Wener	4:05
5.	"Feeling Peaky"	Wener	2:54
6.	"Shrinkwrapped"	Wener	4:46
7.	"Dress Like Your Mother"	Wener; MacLure	2:34
8.	"Statuesque"	Wener	3:23
9.	"Glue Ears"	Wener; MacLure	4:46
10.	"Nice Guy Eddie"	Wener	3:20
11.	"Stop Your Crying"	Wener	3:35
12.	"Factor 41"	Wener	2:58
13.	"Click...off...gone"	Wener	2:52
14.	"Package Holiday"	Wener	2:57
15.	"Oh Well"	Wener	2:12
16.	"Atomic"	Debbie Harry; Jimmy Destri	5:11

2010 remastered edition bonus disc
No.	Title	Writer(s)	Length
1.	"Paint Me"	Wener; MacLure	3:25
2.	"Room at the Top"	Wener; MacLure	3:07
3.	"Disco Duncan (live)"	Wener	4:09
4.	"Vegas (live)"	Wener	3:14
5.	"Amuse (live)"	Wener	2:32
6.	"Atomic"	Debbie Harry; Jimmy Destri	5:11
7.	"Package Holiday"	Wener; MacLure	2:57
8.	"Oh Well"	Wener	2:12
9.	"Pokerface"	Wener; MacLure	3:32
10.	"Blazer Sleeves"	Wener	2:52
11.	"Inbetweener (Live)"	Wener	3:55
12.	"She's a Sweetheart"	Wener	3:31
13.	"Statuesque (Boxed Off mix)"	Wener	6:31
14.	"Atomic (Wubble U mix)"	Wener	8:21
15.	"The Other End of the Telescope"	Elvis Costello; Aimee Mann	4:31
16.	"Spies"	Wener	3:14

Notes

- Bonus disc: Tracks 1–5 taken from the "What Do I Do Now" single b-sides; 6–8 from "Sale of the Century" single; 9–11 from "Nice Guy Eddie" single; 12–16 from "Statuesque" single.

== Personnel ==
Personnel per booklet.

Sleeper

- Louise Wener – vocals, guitar
- Andy Maclure – drums, acoustic guitar, percussion, keyboards (track 11)
- Jon Stewart – guitar, keyboards (track 1)
- Diid Osman – bass

Additional musicians

- Stephen Street – keyboards, programming
- John Green – piano, synthesizers

Production and design

- Stephen Street – producer (all except track 1), mixing (track 1)
- John Smith – engineer, producer (track 12)
- Bruce Lampcov – producer (track 1)
- Tom Girling – assistant engineer
- Julie Gardner – assistant engineer
- Kevin Westenberg – Sleeper photography

== Certifications ==
Region	Certification	Certified units/sales
United Kingdom (BPI)	Platinum	300,000^{^}
^{^} Shipments figures based on certification alone.
