= Delicious (song) =

1994 single by Sleeper

Single by Sleeper

from the album Smart
- B-side: "Lady Love Your Countryside"; "Bedside Manners"; "Tatty"
- Released: May 1994
- Genre: Britpop
- Length: 3:01
- Label: Indolent
- Songwriters: Louise Wener; Jon Stewart
- Producer: Ian Broudie

Sleeper singles chronology
"Swallow" (1994)	"Delicious" (1994)	"Inbetweener" (1995)

Music video
- "Delicious" on YouTube

"Delicious" is a 1994 song by English Britpop band Sleeper, written by the band's vocalist and guitarist, Louise Wener, along with band guitarist Jon Stewart. It was produced by Ian Broudie of the Lightning Seeds. Released in May 1994, "Delicious" was later announced as the number-20 song in John Peel's Festive Fifty and the following year would go on to feature on Smart, the band's debut album. B-side "Lady Love Your Countryside" would also be re-recorded for inclusion on Smart. In 1995, "Delicious" was released commercially in Europe and sent to alternative radio in the United States.

== Release ==
In the United Kingdom, "Delicious" was released by Indolent in May 1994. The single made the band's first impression on the UK singles chart by debuting at number 75. In 1995, BMG distributed the "Delicious" single across Europe. Radio airplay promos were augmented with acoustic versions of "Delicious" and "Little Annie", recorded for P4 Danmarks Radio.

In the United States, Arista Records chose "Delicious" as the lead single from Smart at the end of February 1995. The band had been personally endorsed by label president Clive Davis, who had attended a secret Sleeper gig in London at the end of January (under the alias of "The Inbetweeners") to mark the chart success of their single "Inbetweener", and had scheduled the band to come over for live and promotional work across the US and Canada throughout April and May. "Delicious" was sent to alternative radio stations at this time; while a new music video for the American market was considered. "Most people want us to do very literal videos for that song," Andy Maclure explained, "and so far we've resisted.".

== Track listings ==
All tracks were written by Louise Wener and Jon Stewart, except "Lady Love Your Countryside", written by Wener.

- UK 7-inch single
1. "Delicious" – 3:02
2. "Lady Love Your Countryside" – 2:40
3. "Bedside Manners" – 2:55
- UK 12-inch and CD single
- European maxi-CD single
1. "Delicious" – 3:02
2. "Lady Love Your Countryside" – 2:40
3. "Bedside Manners" – 2:55
4. "Tatty"– 3:57
- European CD single
1. "Delicious" – 3:02
2. "Lady Love Your Countryside" – 2:40

== Charts ==
Chart (1994)	Peak position
Scottish Singles Sales (Official Charts)	81
UK Singles (Official Charts)	75
