= Swallow (song) =

1994 single by Sleeper

Single by Sleeper

from the album Smart
- B-side: "Twisted"; "One Girl Dreaming"
- Released: 31 January 1994
- Length: 2:41
- Label: Indolent
- Songwriters: Louise Wener; Jon Stewart
- Producer: Paul Corkett

Sleeper singles chronology
"Swallow" (1994)	"Delicious" (1994)

"Swallow" is a song by English Britpop Sleeper, written by the band's vocalist and guitarist, Louise Wener, along with guitarist Jon Stewart. Produced by Paul Corkett, "Swallow" was released as the band's debut single and as the follow-up to their debut extended play release, Alice in Vain. At the end of 1994, "Swallow" was ranked at number 48 on John Peel's Festive Fifty. The following year, both "Swallow" and "Twisted" were re-recorded for inclusion on Smart, the band's debut album.

== Background ==
"It's actually a misunderstood song", Wener told the band's official fanzine, denying that the song was about oral sex, adding: "it's about a relationship breaking down. It's actually a really sad song. It's also about when people steal all your secrets and know all there is to know about you and the image is a metaphor for that." Indolent released "Swallow" as a 7-inch and CD single on 31 January 1994, backed with studio versions of "Twisted" and "One Girl Dreaming", two tracks which the band were then playing as part of their live set. To promote the single, Sleeper performed a four-song set of "Twisted", "Pyrotechnician", "Bedside Manners" and "Hunch" at their first Peel Session.

== Track listings ==
All tracks were written by Louise Wener and Jon Stewart.

- UK 7-inch and CD single
1. "Swallow" – 2:42
2. "Twisted" – 3:22
3. "One Girl Dreaming" – 4:19

== Charts ==
Chart (1994)	Peak position
UK Singles (OCC)	76
