= Sale of the Century (song) =

1996 single by Sleeper

Single by Sleeper

from the album The It Girl
- B-side: "Atomic"; "Package Holiday"; "Oh Well"
- Released: 22 April 1996
- Genre: Britpop
- Length: 4:35
- Label: Indolent
- Songwriters: Louise Wener; Andy MacLure
- Producer: Stephen Street

Sleeper singles chronology
"What Do I Do Now?" (1995)	"Sale of the Century" (1996)	"Nice Guy Eddie" (1996)

Music video
- "Sale of the Century" on YouTube

"Sale of the Century" is a song by Britpop band Sleeper, written by the band's vocalist and guitarist, Louise Wener, and drummer Andy Maclure. In Europe, "Sale of the Century" was the second single to be released from their second album, The It Girl, in 1996 and became the group's first top-10 hit on the UK Singles Chart. One of the single's B-sides is "Atomic", a cover of the Blondie song, recorded for the Trainspotting soundtrack.

Wener said of the protagonist of "Sale of the Century": "Love makes you a little insane, yet rationality always kicks in. Dreamy persistence fascinates me, but so does powerlessness, ruined lives, and people who can't or don't get what they want."

== Release ==
"Sale of the Century" was released in the United Kingdom on 22 April 1996. In the United States, Arista Records positioned "Sale of the Century" as the lead-off single for the North American release of the album, submitting a radio edit of the track to alternative radio. Billboard magazine were quick to point out that the single and the band were distinctive from other Britpop acts by not borrowing from the Beatles. "Like all great Top 40 gems, this song has wit, lyrical power, melodic beauty, and a muscular backbeat", Larry Flick wrote in his Billboard review for "Sale of the Century", adding that the song was "one of the most thrilling summer singles for years". "Sale of the Century" preceded the release of The It Girl, which impacted stores across North America on 18 June 1996. Nevertheless, it still failed to reach any North American chart positions.

== Track listings ==
- UK 7-inch and cassette single
1. "Sale of the Century" – 4:34
2. "Atomic" – 3:57
- UK CD single
1. "Sale of the Century" – 4:34
2. "Package Holiday" – 2:56
3. "Oh Well" – 2:10
- European and Australian maxi-CD single
1. "Sale of the Century" – 4:34
2. "Package Holiday" – 2:56
3. "Oh Well" – 2:10
4. "Atomic"– 3:57

== Charts ==
Chart (1996)	Peak position
Scotland Singles (Official Charts)	13
UK Singles (Official Charts)	10
