= Statuesque =

1996 single by Sleeper

Single by Sleeper

from the album The It Girl
- B-side: "She's a Sweetheart"; "Spies"; "The Other End of the Telescope"; "Atomic" (remix)
- Released: 23 September 1996
- Genre: Britpop
- Length: 3:23
- Label: Indolent
- Songwriter: Louise Wener
- Producer: Stephen Street

Sleeper singles chronology
"Nice Guy Eddie" (1996)	"Statuesque" (1996)	"She's a Good Girl" (1997)

"Statuesque" is a song by Britpop band Sleeper, written by the band's vocalist and guitarist, Louise Wener. "Statuesque" was the fourth and final single to be released from Sleeper's second album, The It Girl, and became the group's last top-20 hit on the UK Singles Chart.

== Background ==
"Statuesque" soundtracks a key scene at the end of the 1996 hit movie Trainspotting, and featured on the additional soundtrack album Trainspotting #2: Music from the Motion Picture, Vol. #2 the following year. Sleeper had also covered Blondie's 1980 hit "Atomic", for the movie; a remix of the song backed the single formats, along with a remix of "Statuesque" by then Evening Session DJ Steve Lamacq. For the B-sides of "Statuesque", Sleeper recorded two new tracks: "She's a Sweetheart" and "Spies", as well as a cover of Elvis Costello's "The Other End of the Telescope", after Costello covered their own "What Do I Do Now?".

== Critical reception ==
Jack Rabid of AllMusic called the track "Blondie-like", likening it in particular to "(I'm Always Touched by Your) Presence, Dear".

== Track listings ==
- UK 7-inch single

A. "Statuesque" – 4:34
B. "She's a Sweetheart" – 3:31

- UK CD1
1. "Statuesque" – 4:34
2. "She's a Sweetheart" – 3:31
3. "Spies" – 3:14
- UK CD2
1. "Statuesque" – 4:34
2. "Statuesque" (The Boxed Off mix) – 6:11
3. "The Other End of the Telescope" – 4:31
4. "Atomic" (Wubble U mix) – 8:21
- Australian CD single
1. "Statuesque" – 4:34
2. "She's a Sweetheart" – 3:31
3. "Spies" – 3:14
4. "Statuesque" (The Boxed Off mix) – 6:11
5. "The Other End of the Telescope" – 4:31
6. "Atomic" (Wubble U mix) – 8:21

== Charts ==
Chart (1996)	Peak position
Scotland Singles (OCC)	24
UK Singles (OCC)	17
