= Live Forever: The Rise and Fall of Brit Pop =

Live Forever
- UK theatrical poster by Damien Hirst
- Directed by: John Dower
- Written by: John Dower
- Produced by: John Battsek
- Starring: Noel Gallagher; Liam Gallagher; Damon Albarn; Jarvis Cocker
- Edited by: Jake Martin
- Distributed by: BBC
- Release date: 21 March 2003
- Running time: 82 minutes
- Country: United Kingdom

Live Forever: The Rise and Fall of Brit Pop is a 2003 documentary film written and directed by John Dower. The documentary is a study of popular culture in the United Kingdom during the mid-1990s. The focus of the piece is the main movement in British popular music during that time, which came under strong media attention and was dubbed Britpop.

The political landscape of the time also features. Much is made of Tony Blair and New Labour's efforts to align themselves with the Cool Britannia cultural resurgence that was underway. The documentary features a number of prominent UK musical and artistic figures, but relies heavily on contributions from Noel and Liam Gallagher of Oasis, Damon Albarn of Blur, and Jarvis Cocker of Pulp. Other contributors include 3D from Massive Attack, Louise Wener from Sleeper, the fashion designer Ozwald Boateng, and the contemporary artist Damien Hirst.

== Live Forever compilation album ==
The compilation album Live Forever – The Best of Britpop was issued on the Virgin TV label in conjunction with the documentary's theatrical release. It features songs from the film and other notable artists of the Britpop era.

=== Track listing ===
==== CD 1 ====
1. "Live Forever" – Oasis
2. "Common People" – Pulp
3. "Parklife" – Blur
4. "Alright" – Supergrass
5. "Girl From Mars" – Ash
6. "Waking Up" – Elastica
7. "Mulder and Scully" – Catatonia
8. "Finetime" – Cast
9. "The Changingman" – Paul Weller
10. "Stupid Girl" – Garbage
11. "Everything Must Go" – Manic Street Preachers
12. "The Riverboat Song" – Ocean Colour Scene
13. "Atomic" – Sleeper
14. "Tattva" – Kula Shaker
15. "Come Back to What You Know" – Embrace
16. "Wide Open Space" – Mansun
17. "6 Underground" – Sneaker Pimps
18. "Female of the Species" – Space
19. "You're Gorgeous" – Babybird
20. "Angels" – Robbie Williams

==== CD 2 ====
1. "Protection" – Massive Attack
2. "Street Spirit (Fade Out)" – Radiohead
3. "Stars" – Dubstar
4. "The More You Ignore Me, The Closer I Get" – Morrissey
5. "Beautiful Ones" – Suede
6. "The Life of Riley" – The Lightning Seeds
7. "Inbetweener" – Sleeper
8. "King of the Kerb" – Echobelly
9. "Getting Better" – Shed Seven
10. "Ready to Go" – Republica
11. "Setting Sun" – The Chemical Brothers
12. "Nancy Boy" – Placebo
13. "Breathe" – The Prodigy
14. "Weak" – Skunk Anansie
15. "Born Slippy" – Underworld
16. "Loaded" – Primal Scream
17. "Step On" – Happy Mondays
18. "The Only One I Know" – The Charlatans
19. "Champagne Supernova" – Oasis
