= Nice Guy Eddie =

1996 single by Sleeper

Single by Sleeper

from the album The It Girl
- B-side: "Pokerface"; "Blazer Sleeves"
- Released: 1 July 1996
- Genre: Britpop
- Length: 3:23
- Label: Indolent
- Songwriter: Louise Wener
- Producer: Stephen Street

Sleeper singles chronology
"Sale of the Century" (1996)	"Nice Guy Eddie" (1996)	"Statuesque" (1996)

Music video
- "Nice Guy Eddie" on YouTube

"Nice Guy Eddie" is a song by English Britpop band Sleeper, written by the band's vocalist and guitarist, Louise Wener. It was the third single to be released from their second album, The It Girl, and peaked at number 10 on the UK Singles Chart.

While the tracks from The It Girl were being demoed, several tracks had working titles based on characters from Reservoir Dogs; Nice Guy Eddie is the only one that kept that name.

== Track listings ==
- UK and European CD single
1. "Nice Guy Eddie" – 3:23
2. "Pokerface" – 3:30
3. "Blazer Sleeves" – 2:50
- UK 7-inch and cassette single
1. "Nice Guy Eddie" – 3:23
2. "Inbetweener" (live) – 3:55
3. "Inbetweener" (featuring Mark and Lard)

== Charts ==
Chart (1996)	Peak position
Scottish Singles Sales (Official Charts)	11
UK Singles (Official Charts)	10
