= The Modern Age (album) =

Studio album by Sleeper
- Released: 22 March 2019
- Studios: Metway Studios, London; Louise and Andy's attic, Brighton
- Genre: Indie rock
- Length: 36:45
- Label: Gorsky
- Producer: Stephen Street

Sleeper chronology
Inbetweener – The Best of Sleeper (2016)	The Modern Age (2019)	This Time Tomorrow (2020)

Singles from The Modern Age
- 1. "Look at You Now" Released: 4 December 2018; 2. "The Sun Also Rises" Released: 26 April 2019; 3. "More Than I Do" Released: 16 August 2019

The Modern Age is the fourth studio album by English Britpop band Sleeper. The album was released in the UK on 22 March 2019, and peaked at number 18 on the UK Album Chart. Three singles were released from this album, "Look At You Now", "The Sun Also Rises" and "More Than I Do", all of which failed to chart.

== Critical reception ==
Professional ratings
Aggregate scores
Source	Rating
AnyDecentMusic?	6.5/10
Metacritic	64/100
Review scores
Source	Rating
AllMusic	3.5/5 stars
The Line of Best Fit	7.5/10
Mojo	2/5 stars
NME	3/5 stars
Paste	7.7/10
Q	3/5 stars
The Skinny	3/5 stars
The Times	2/5 stars
Uncut	7/10
Under the Radar	7/10

In a review for the NME, Mark Beaumont stated that The Modern Age had "just enough of the old Smart magic here to satisfy the retro crowds", and gave the record a three-star review.

== Track listing ==
All tracks are written by Louise Wener and Andy MacLure.

No.	Title	Length
1.	"Paradise Waiting"	3:22
2.	"Look at You Now"	4:07
3.	"The Sun Also Rises"	3:39
4.	"Dig"	2:50
5.	"The Modern Age"	4:04
6.	"Cellophane"	3:27
7.	"Car into the Sea"	4:07
8.	"Blue Like You"	3:35
9.	"More Than I Do"	3:44
10.	"Big Black Sun"	3:50
Total length:		36:45

== Personnel ==
Sleeper

- Louise Wener – vocals, guitar
- Jon Stewart – guitar
- Kieron Pepper – bass, Omnichord, ring pull
- Andy MacLure – drums, guitar, piano, keyboards, percussion, programming

Production

- Stephen Street – producer
- Toby May – engineering
- John Davies – mastering

== Chart ==
Chart (2019)	Peak position
UK Albums (Official Charts)	18
