= My Scientology Movie =

2015 British documentary film by John Dower

- UK theatrical release poster
- Directed by: John Dower
- Written by: Louis Theroux
- Produced by: Simon Chinn
- Starring: Louis Theroux; Mark Rathbun; Andrew Perez; Rob Alter; Jefferson Hawkins; Tom De Vocht; Marc Headley; Steve Mango; Catherine Fraser
- Cinematography: Will Pugh
- Edited by: Paul Carlin
- Music by: Dan Jones
- Production companies: BBC Films; BBC Worldwide; Red Box Films; HanWay Films
- Distributed by: Altitude Film Distribution
- Release dates: 14 October 2015 (London); 7 October 2016 (United Kingdom)
- Running time: 99 minutes
- Country: United Kingdom
- Language: English
- Box office: $2.2 million

My Scientology Movie is a 2015 British documentary film about Scientology directed by John Dower, and written by and starring Louis Theroux. The film takes an unconventional approach to the subject matter, featuring young actors "auditioning" for parts playing high-profile Scientologists in scenes recreating accounts from ex-members about incidents involving senior church management. The Church of Scientology responded by putting the filmmakers under surveillance and denouncing the film.

My Scientology Movie premiered at the London Film Festival on 14 October 2015 before receiving a limited theatrical release in the United Kingdom on 7 October 2016 from BBC Films with a North American release on 3 March 2017 from Magnolia Pictures. The film received positive reviews from critics.

== Synopsis ==
After the Church of Scientology refuses to cooperate in making a documentary, Louis Theroux teams up with former senior church official Mark Rathbun to create dramatic reconstructions of incidents within the church witnessed by Rathbun and other ex-Scientologists. They focus in particular on alleged violent behaviour by the church's leader David Miscavige at its secretive Gold Base facility in California, which Theroux visits. The church retaliates by putting Theroux and his film crew under surveillance, leading to camera-wielding confrontations with a Scientology "squirrel buster" team and with church officials outside Gold Base. Theroux raises questions about Rathbun's own former complicity in the church's "terroristic" activities, leading to tensions between the two.

== Development ==
Theroux had long sought to make a documentary about the Church of Scientology from the inside but was repeatedly refused by church officials. In 2011, his producer, Simon Chinn, suggested making a 90-minute feature about Scientology. Together with director John Dower, they looked for ways to make a documentary – working title Stairway to Heaven: Louis Theroux and the Church of Scientology – without access to its subjects. They wanted to avoid formulae that had been used by previous film-makers, such as interviews with ex-members intercut with archive footage and re-enactments, or an "in search of" approach documenting the fruitless quest to gain access. They eventually hit upon the idea of "negative access", illustrating the church by provoking a reaction from it. As Tim Robey of The Daily Telegraph puts it, contrasting it with the more methodical Going Clear by Alex Gibney, "where Gibney circled the movement right from its beginnings, seeking to analyse its methods and impugn its motives, Theroux just gets right in there and jabs it in the ribs, that imperturbable mask of irony driving its partisans even more bananas than usual."

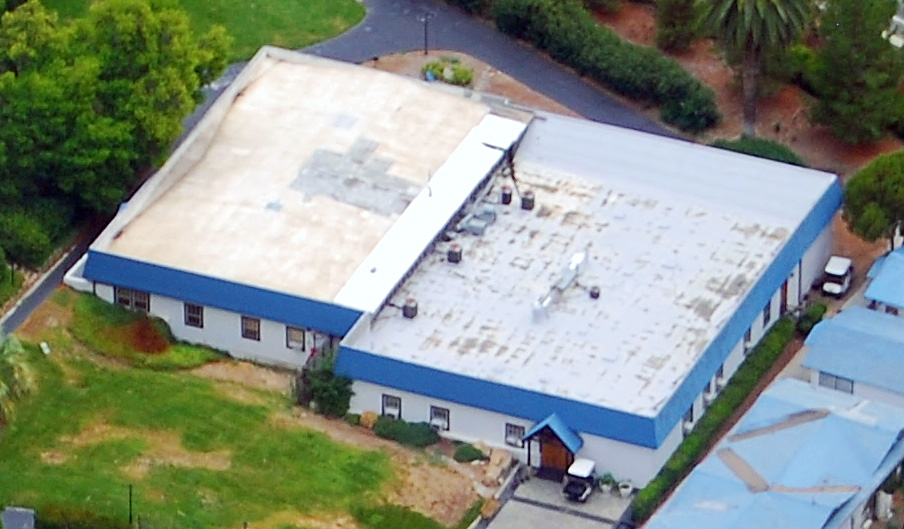
The Hole at Gold Base, where some re-enactments in My Scientology Movie are set

Theroux and his team sought to take "inspiration from the showbusiness trappings of Scientology itself". With the help of various actors, they recreated events related by ex-members in the church's Gold Base and its punishment facility, The Hole. The ex-members who related these events helped to direct the scenes, which were filmed on soundstages in Hollywood. According to Theroux, "this was simply a visual way of bringing people's memories to life. But it soon became clear that the re-enactments would also allow me to question and probe those former Scientologists' versions of events." In conjunction with the former senior Scientology official Mark Rathbun, who is now one of the church's most prominent critics, he held auditions for about 30 young actors to play parts depicting church leader David Miscavige and its most famous member, Tom Cruise. In the process, "the documentary became a film about me trying to make the re-enactments". Theroux took inspiration from a film that he had recently seen, Joshua Oppenheimer's documentary The Act of Killing, which featured Indonesian genocidaires re-enacting their crimes for the camera.

The church's reaction was predicted by Theroux, who said, "They have a habit of tailing, filming, questioning and investigating those who do stories on them." Within a couple of months of the start of filming, the film-makers found themselves under constant surveillance. The church mounted a campaign of harassment against the film-makers which drew "all kinds of stalker-ish emissaries and cranks out of the woodwork, not one of them doing much to reassure us that Scientology is in fact cuddly, socially progressive or misunderstood." They found themselves pursued "in broad daylight by mysterious cars with tinted windows". Occasionally they had face-to-face confrontations with camera-toting pursuers which they filmed in turn, so that "half the film consists of cameras pointing at other cameras, like an absurdist gunfight at dawn, with neither side willing to holster." They also received numerous letters from Scientology lawyers. Theroux found this behavior very strange: "They are behaving in a way that is so obviously pathological—you would think they would realize that other people would see that and think this is a religion of lunatics."

== Reception ==
The film was praised by The Daily Telegraph reviewer Tim Robey as "a giddy, Pythonesque delight". He commented that it was "all wickedly tendentious mischief, but when it's this gloriously funny, the points score themselves." Variety magazine reviewer Guy Lodge described it as a "riotously funny" film that delivered "penetrating insights into the fiercely guarded administration of the church that Ron built. It's also a witty essay on the politics of surveillance". Fionnuala Halligan of Screen Daily called the film "typically quixotic, consistently funny, and provocative in unexpected ways", describing it as "pleasingly eccentric" and "impish yet effective". The Huffington Post called the film "absurdly funny". In The Guardian, John Patterson found that the film "pulls off the neat trick of finding a revelatory approach to a topic that's been well covered of late: the Church of Scientology" before concluding that it "belongs in the company of the most serious work done on the church. The more sunlight that falls on this dark organisation, the better for all of us".

Writing in The Observer, The Guardian's Sunday sister paper, reviewer Wendy Ide was less impressed, finding, "This is less an in-depth investigation into the Church of Scientology than an entertaining but highly contrived string of scenes featuring Louis Theroux kicking an anthill and then watching the inhabitants react. […] However, the one thing we do take from it is that the Church of Scientology is no laughing matter. The definitive film on the subject remains Alex Gibney’s Going Clear."

== Soundtrack ==
The original music from the film was scored by composer Dan Jones, with additional music by Stew Jackson and performances by the BBC National Orchestra of Wales. The soundtrack was released in September 2016 by Wave Theory Records.
