= Apocalipstick =

Apocalipstick may refer to:

- Apocalipstick, a collected edition of the comic book series The Invisibles
- Apocalipstick, a 2003 novel by Sue Margolis
- Apocalipstick, a cancelled video game by Theresa Duncan
- Apocalipstick, a 2010 book by Carlos Monsiváis
- Apocalipstick (album), a 2017 album by Cherry Glazerr
- Apocalipstick, a 2017 album by Harpoonist & The Axe Murderer
- Apocalipstick, a 2024 drag show by Reuben Kaye

== See also ==
- "Apocalipstic", a 1986 song by Twink
- The Apocalipstix, a 2008 graphic novel by Cameron Stewart
