= Pleased to Meet You (Sleeper album) =

Studio album by Sleeper
- Released: 13 October 1997
- Recorded: 1997
- Genre: Britpop
- Length: 52:02
- Label: Indolent
- Producers: Stephen Street, Cenzo Townshend, Sleeper

Sleeper chronology
The It Girl (1996)	Pleased to Meet You (1997)	Greatest Hits (2007)

Singles from Pleased to Meet You
- 1. "She's a Good Girl" Released: 22 September 1997; 2. "Romeo Me" Released: 24 November 1997

Professional ratings
Review scores
Source	Rating
AllMusic	3/5 stars
NME	3/10
Uncut	3/5 stars

Pleased to Meet You is the third studio album by English Britpop band Sleeper. The album was released on 13 October 1997 in the UK, peaking at #7 on the UK Album Chart. Two singles were released from this album, "She's a Good Girl", which reached #28, and "Romeo Me", which scraped in at #39 on the UK Top 40 singles chart. Remixes of "Motorway Man" by producer Steve Osbourne were released on 12" vinyl.

In a review for AllMusic, Stephen Thomas Erlewine stated that Pleased to Meet You "demonstrates that [Louise] Wener's songwriting has strengthened, as her melodies have more weight and her lyrics have more depth," and gave the record a three-star review. It was recorded in summer 1997 in London.

== Track listing ==
Credits per booklet.

No.	Title	Writer(s)	Producer	Length
1.	"Please Please Please"	Louise Wener, Andy MacLure	Stephen Street	4:10
2.	"She's a Good Girl"	Wener	Street	4:00
3.	"Rollercoaster"	Wener	Street	5:18
4.	"Miss You"	Wener	Street	3:54
5.	"You Got Me"	Wener	Street	3:41
6.	"Breathe"	MacLure	Street	4:36
7.	"Superclean"	Wener	Street	3:12
8.	"Firecracker"	Wener	Street	4:03
9.	"Because of You"	Wener	Street	4:09
10.	"Romeo Me"	Wener	Street	4:03
11.	"Nothing Is Changing"	Wener	Street	3:48
12.	"Motorway Man"	Wener	Street, Cenzo Townsend, Sleeper	3:47
13.	"Traffic Accident"	Wener	Street	3:22
Total length:				52:01

Japanese edition
No.	Title	Writer(s)	Production/Mix	Length
14.	"She's a Sweetheart"	Louise Wener	Stephen Street	3:30
15.	"Spies"	Louise Wener	Stephen Street	3:14

== Personnel ==
Personnel per booklet.

Sleeper

- Louise Wener – vocals, guitar
- Andy Maclure – drums, percussion, guitar, keyboard, string arranger (track 11)
- Jon Stewart – guitar

Additional musicians

- Chris Giammalvo – electric bass, double bass
- John Green – keyboards, string arrangement
- Stephen Street – programming
- John Metcalf – string arranger (track 10)
- The Duke String Quartet – strings
- The Kick Horns – brass (track 2)

Production and design

- Stephen Street – producer, mixing
- Cenzo Townsend – producer (track 12), mixing, engineer
- Sleeper – producer (track 12)
- John Smith – engineer
- Gerrard Navarro – assistant engineer
- Tom Girling – assistant engineer
- Andy Green – assistant engineer
- Laurence Stevens – design & art direction

== Certifications ==
Region	Certification	Certified units/sales
United Kingdom (BPI)	Silver	60,000^{^}
^{^} Shipments figures based on certification alone.
