= John Dower =

John Dower may refer to:

- John Dower (civil servant) (1900–1947), British civil servant and architect
- John Dower (filmmaker), British filmmaker
- John W. Dower (born 1938), American historian
