= Vegas (Sleeper song) =

1995 single by Sleeper

Single by Sleeper

from the album Smart
- B-side: "Hymn to Her"; "It's Wrong of You to Breed"; "Close"
- Released: 27 March 1995
- Length: 3:15
- Label: Indolent
- Songwriter: Louise Wener
- Producer: Bruce Lampcov

Sleeper singles chronology
"Inbetweener" (1995)	"Vegas" (1995)	"What Do I Do Now?" (1995)

"Vegas" is a song by English Britpop band Sleeper, written by the band's vocalist and guitarist Louise Wener. In March 1995, it was released as the fourth and final single from Sleeper's debut album, Smart, when it followed the success of "Inbetweener" by peaking within the UK top 40. The single release of "Vegas" was backed with a number of specially recorded B-sides, including a cover of the Pretenders "Hymn to Her".

== Writing and composition ==
Louise Wener explained to the band's official fanzine that "Vegas" was about "this guy who lives in a really dingy bedsit in Peckham who's really lonely", adding that he saves up his money to fly to Las Vegas, gambles it away and meets Frank Sinatra. Andy Maclure described the song as "a study of the kind of life people get trapped in, in England", adding that he thought that the character in the song would probably never get around to doing what he does. Wener compared the song to "early Rod Stewart" material. Percussion on "Vegas" was performed by Primal Scream's drummer.

For the single release of "Vegas", the band went into the studio to completely re-record the track with record producer Bruce Lampcov. Sleeper happened to be in the studio at the same time as Blur, whom Sleeper had supported on tour previously, and asked Graham Coxon to record a saxophone part for the new version. Coxon's performance is credited to Morgan C. Hoax – an anagram of his name. The music video for "Vegas" featured fifty Elvis-lookalikes. The impersonator agency did not have enough Elvises to meet the needs of the production, so sent their Humphrey Bogarts and Clint Eastwoods to make up the numbers, who were reportedly unhappy at having to dress as Elvis. "Anyone can do Elvis, they reasoned, but a Bogart, or an Eastwood, now that takes real skill!" Wener recalled later.

== Track listings ==
- UK 7-inch and cassette single
1. "Vegas" – 3:21
2. "Hymn to Her" – 3:34
- UK 12-inch and CD single
- German CD single
1. "Vegas" – 3:21
2. "Hymn to Her" – 3:34
3. "It's Wrong of You to Breed" – 3:02
4. "Close" – 4:46

== Personnel ==
- Diid Osman – bass
- Andy MacLure – drums
- Jon Stewart – guitar
- Louise Wener – vocals, guitar
- Graham Coxon (credited as Morgan C. Hoax) – saxophone
- Caroline Dale – strings
- Bruce Lampcov – production ("Vegas" (Single Version))
- Sleeper – production ("Hymn to Her" and "It's Wrong of You to Breed")
- Jon Stewart – production ("Close")

== Charts ==
Chart (1994)	Peak position
Scotland Singles (OCC)	33
UK Singles (OCC)	33
UK Indie (Music Week)	1
