= Smart (Sleeper album) =

Studio album by Sleeper
- Released: 13 February 1995
- Recorded: 1994
- Genre: Britpop
- Label: Indolent/Arista
- Producers: Paul Corkett; Sleeper; Ian Broudie

Sleeper chronology
Smart (1995)	The It Girl (1996)

Singles from Smart
- 1. "Swallow" Released: 31 January 1994; 2. "Delicious" Released: 9 May 1994; 3. "Inbetweener" Released: 9 January 1995; 4. "Vegas" Released: 27 March 1995

Smart is the debut studio album by English rock band Sleeper, released on 13 February 1995 by Indolent Records. It was mixed by Stephen Street. The album's sleeve photo is of the Mercury Seven astronauts. A 25th anniversary deluxe edition was released in 2020 on both vinyl and CD. The CD version has 10 extra tracks.

== Background ==
Vocalist and guitarist Louise Wener came across guitarist Jon Stewart while the pair were attending Manchester University in 1992. The following year, they moved to London and formed a band with bassist Diid Osman and drummer Andy Maclure of the Crawl. The band, christened Surrender Dorothy, started performing live by mid-1993; they signed to Indolent, who were impressed with the track "Stay", and changed their name to Sleeper. Stewart said there were "about a dozen Surrender Dororthys" in the United States. They played a few shows under this new name prior to the release of the "Alice in Vain" single, in November 1993. "Swallow" was then released as a single in February 1994, followed by "Delicious" in May 1994, the latter of which peaked at number 75 on the UK Singles Chart. Soon afterwards, they went on tour supporting Blur, and released the Bucket & Spade EP in June 1994.

== Release ==
"Inbetweener" was released as a single in January 1995. Author Dave Thompson, in his book Alternative Rock (2000), wrote that it was the most anticipated album of the year that overcame the "hype, hope, and hubris which attended it", despite the tabloid press focusing its efforts "searching for details of Wener's mid-album split" from Stewart. "Vegas" was released as a single in March 1995.

== Reception ==
Professional ratings
Review scores
Source	Rating
AllMusic	4/5 stars
Alternative Rock	7/10
Christgau's Consumer Guide	(1-star Honorable Mention)
Q	3/5 stars
Record Collector	4/5 stars
Select	4/5
Uncut	7/10

Thompson said the band's "quietly seething indy-pop" positively accentuates Wener's "tough vulnerability. Right now, the focus is squarely on the lyrics' vivid tales of sex, death, and the vanities and vagaries of modern life."

== Track listing ==
Credits per booklet.

No.	Title	Writer(s)	Producer	Length
1.	"Inbetweener"	Louise Wener	Paul Corkett; Sleeper	3:18
2.	"Swallow"	Wener; Jon Stewart	Corkett; Sleeper	2:42
3.	"Delicious"	Wener; Stewart	Ian Broudie	3:01
4.	"Hunch"	Wener; Stewart	Corkett; Sleeper	3:38
5.	"Amuse"	Wener	Corkett; Sleeper	2:09
6.	"Bedhead"	Wener	Corkett; Sleeper	3:00
7.	"Lady Love Your Countryside"	Wener	Corkett; Sleeper	2:40
8.	"Vegas"	Wener	Corkett; Sleeper	3:14
9.	"Poor Flying Man"	Wener; Stewart	Corkett; Sleeper	4:01
10.	"Alice in Vain"	Wener; Stewart	Corkett; Sleeper	3:35
11.	"Twisted"	Wener; Stewart	Corkett; Sleeper	3:01
12.	"Pyrotechnician"	Wener; Stewart	Corkett; Sleeper	3:26

2020 25th anniversary deluxe edition bonus tracks
No.	Title	Writer(s)	Length
13.	"Bedside Manners"	Wener; Stewart	2:53
14.	"Tatty"	Wener	3:56
15.	"Little Annie"	Wener	2:48
16.	"It's Wrong of You to Breed"	Wener	3:00
17.	"One Girl Dreaming"	Wener	4:19
18.	"Alice in Vain" (Single Version)	Wener	3:31
19.	"Hymn to Her"	Meg Keene	3:33
20.	"Big Nurse"	Wener	4:08
21.	"Ha Ha You're Dead"	Wener	3:31
22.	"Bank"	Wener	1:26

== Personnel ==
Personnel per booklet.

Sleeper

- Louise Wener – vocals, guitar
- Jon Stewart – guitars
- Andy Maclure – drums, percussion
- Diid Osman – bass

Production and design

- Paul Corkett – producer (all except track 3), mixing (tracks 5 and 8)
- Sleeper – producer, design
- Stephen Street – mixing (all except tracks 3, 5 and 8)
- Ian Broudie – producer (track 3), mixing (track 3)
- T&CP Associates – design
- NASA – cover picture
- Hulton-Deutsch – cover picture
- Ricky Futura – cover digitally remastered
- Kevin Westenberg – Sleeper photography

== Charts ==
Chart performance for Smart
Chart (1995)	Peak position
UK Albums (Official Charts)	5

== Certifications ==
Region	Certification	Certified units/sales
United Kingdom (BPI)	Gold	100,000^{^}
^{^} Shipments figures based on certification alone.
