= Sue Margolis =

English novelist (1955–2017)

Susan Linda Margolis (née Wener; 5 January 1955 – 1 November 2017) was an English novelist. She is best known for Neurotica (1998) and Apocalipstick (2003).

== Personal life ==
She was the elder daughter of Donald Wener, an Inland Revenue tax inspector from East Ham who had served in the RAF, and Audrey (née Dixon), a bank clerk and former nurse; her younger sister was Louise Wener, musician (with Sleeper) and writer. Her brother Geoff attended Cambridge and managed Sleeper. She failed the eleven-plus exam, going on to a secondary modern school, but due to the encouragement of her parents passed the 13-plus exam and attended grammar school, followed by the University of Nottingham, where she read politics. She trained as a junior school teacher, undertaking practice at a Church of England school at Headingley, but due to a hiring freeze in Leeds went to work for the BBC alongside her husband, Jonathan Margolis, now an author and journalist with the Financial Times, whom she married in 1976. Having been appointed the programme's Yorkshire correspondent, Margolis worked on Woman's Hour until the 1990s, following which she produced Neurotica and continued her writing career.

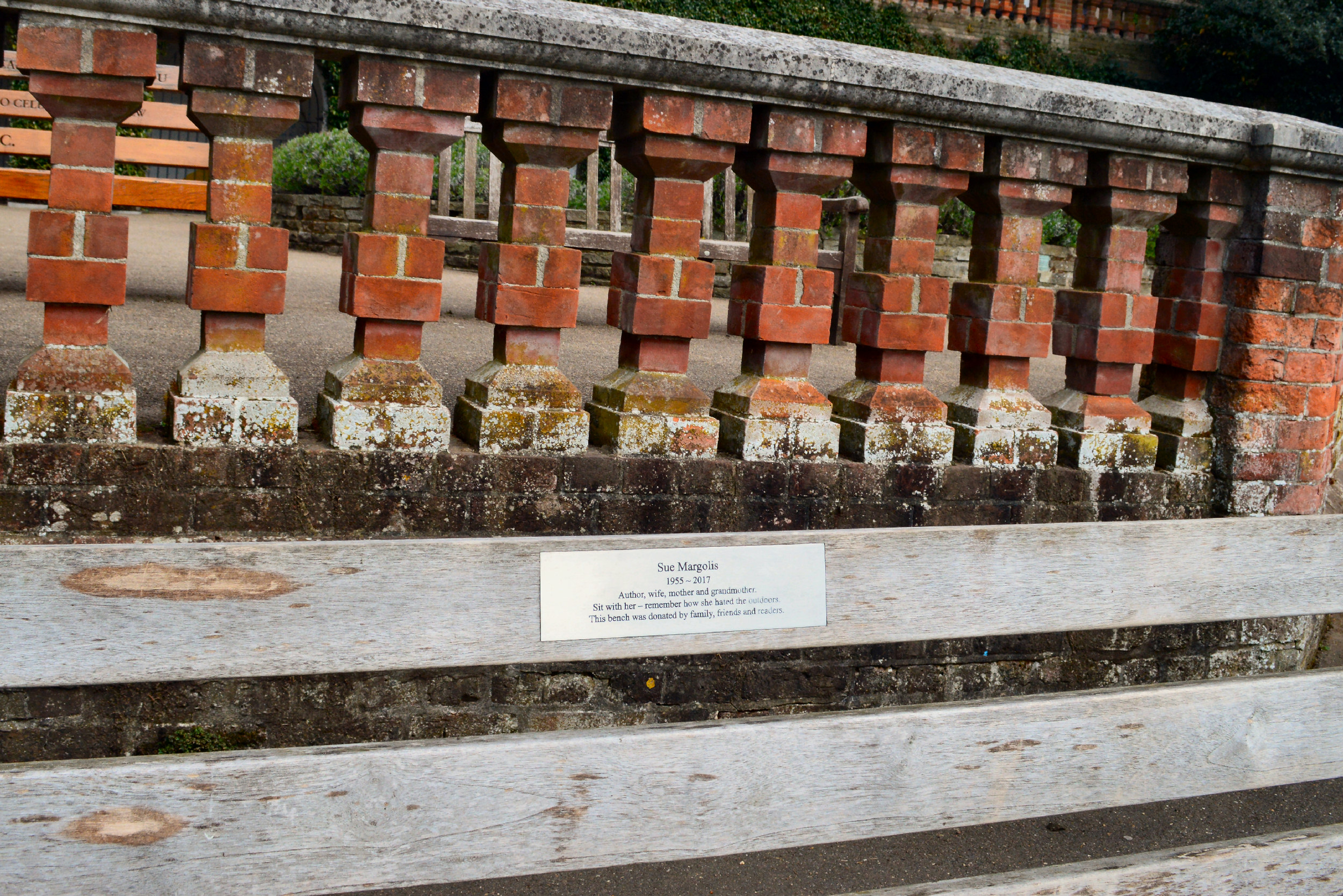
Memorial bench for Sue Margolis at Terrace Gardens, Richmond, London

She died of lung cancer, aged 62, and was survived by her husband, their three children, and grandchildren.

== Works ==
- Days Like These (2016)
- Losing Me (2015)
- Best Supporting Role (2014)
- A Catered Affair (2011)
- Perfect Blend (2010)
- Forget Me Knot (2009)
- Gucci Gucci Coo (2006)
- Original Cyn (2005)
- Breakfast at Stephanie's (2004)
- Apocalipstick (2003)
- Launderama (2002)
- Spin Cycle (2001)
- Sisteria (2000)
- Neurotica (1998)
