= Mark Rathbun =

American Scientology whistleblower

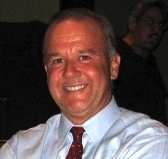
- Born: 1957 (age 68–69); United States
- Known for: Former Inspector General, Religious Technology Center (RTC)
- Spouse(s): Geray Jory (divorced); Anne Joasem (divorced); Monique "Mosey" Rathbun (present)
- Website: markrathbun.blog

Mark C. "Marty" Rathbun (born 1957) is an American former Scientologist who served as a senior executive of the Church of Scientology. He last held the post of Inspector General of the Religious Technology Center (RTC), the organization that is responsible for the protection and enforcement of all Dianetics and Scientology copyrights and trademarks. As the inspector general, Rathbun led the RTC's international Inspector General Network, collectively responsible for internal maintenance and consistency of Scientology's practices and procedures in its organizations, and for ensuring perfect adherence to all Church policies as attributed to Scientology founder L. Ron Hubbard. Rathbun left the Church of Scientology in 2004 and became an independent Scientologist, later stating that he considers himself non-religious. Since 2016, Rathbun began criticizing former church members on his blog. He has also spoken out against prominent critics of Scientology, prompting speculation that he may have returned to the Church.

== Scientology career ==
According to his official biography, Rathbun became a Church of Scientology staff member in 1978, and joined the RTC board in 1987. The biography also credits him with having played a major role in various Church victories, including the negotiation of the Church's tax exemption agreement with the Internal Revenue Service (IRS) in 1993. In 1998, Florida newspaper the Tampa Bay Times described Rathbun as "top lieutenant" to Scientology leader David Miscavige.

In 1997, The New York Times reported that according to an internal Scientology publication, Rathbun and Miscavige jump-started stalled negotiations over Scientology's tax status when they made an unscheduled visit to IRS Commissioner Fred T. Goldberg Jr. at the Internal Revenue Service headquarters in Washington in October 1991. The Church of Scientology and Rathbun later denied that there had been an unscheduled meeting between Goldberg, Rathbun, and Miscavige that day. The Church said that "While an internal publication of three years ago does recount Mr. Miscavige approaching the [IRS], it never states he was granted an unscheduled meeting on demand." Rathbun, in a separate letter to the New York Times, explained that the first meeting he and Miscavige had with Goldberg and other IRS officials was approximately one month after their impromptu visit to the IRS building.

As a Scientology spokesman, Rathbun commented to the same newspaper on the involvement of celebrities in Scientology, saying that "Scientology works for these people, and they just want to give to others what works for them. We don't give them a badge and send them out. They do it on their own." When discussing reluctance among some established churches to collaborate with Scientology under the umbrella of an interfaith organization, he was also quoted as saying that "Bigotry is born out of ignorance."

=== Tom Cruise confessionals ===
In May 2010, Rathbun asserted that during his tenure as Inspector General of the Religious Technology Center, Scientology leader David Miscavige issued him orders that the auditing sessions of celebrity Scientology member Tom Cruise be secretly videotaped. Rathbun had himself been the individual responsible for performing auditing counseling with Cruise. Rathbun wrote on his blog that he had been charged with auditing Cruise during the period in 2001 directly after he had separated from Nicole Kidman. Rathbun wrote, "I audited a number of intensives of confessionals on Tom Cruise from July through November 2001. ... By order of Miscavige many of those sessions were secretly recorded by a well-concealed video camera and voice recorder system built into the VIP auditing room at Celebrity Center International." Rathbun subsequently learned that transcripts of the videotapes of Cruise were brought to meetings where they would be discussed by top management of Scientology. Rathbun wrote that Miscavige would read out information from the reports about Cruise's auditing sessions: "While sipping scotch whisky at the end of the night, Miscavige would read Tom's overts and withholds ... joking and laughing about the content of Tom's confessions."

The nature of what was discussed in the confessional sessions by Cruise was not revealed. Rathbun ceased the filming of Cruise in 2002, because he felt it was unethical. Rathbun left the organization in 2004, and since then has given counseling to former members of Scientology. In a post on his blog, Rathbun wrote a statement addressed to Cruise: "Wake up, Tom. It is not too late. Though, time is getting very, very short." As of May 9, 2010, representatives for Cruise had not yet responded to the statements made by Rathbun.

Lynn Hayes of Beliefnet discussed the revelations by Rathbun, writing, "Religion in any form provides a solid structure that can offer comfort and security, and departure from that security can be frightening and painful. As humans we always have a choice, and it will be interesting to see how Tom Cruise and the Church of Scientology manage this revelation." El Tiempo commented, "Although Tom Cruise is a staunch supporter and defender of Scientology, apparently other members of this doctrine do not profess the same devotion to the actor."

=== Departure from the Church of Scientology ===
Rathbun left the Church of Scientology in 2004 and offered counseling and auditing services for other Scientologists who have cut their ties with the Church. Initially, he considered himself an independent Scientologist, but now considers himself non-religious.

Rathbun emerged as a critical source in a 2009 St. Petersburg Times exposé on the organization, stating that physical violence is a common occurrence within Scientology management, and that Miscavige regularly beats his staff or orders staff to administer beatings to designated individuals – accusations which the Church of Scientology categorically denies. This reporting series by the St. Petersburg Times titled "Inside Scientology: The Truth Rundown" was recognized with honors including the 2010 Gold Medal for Public Service award from the Florida Society of News Editors, and was a finalist for the 2010 National Headliner Awards in the category of investigative reporting.

In December 2018, Jezebel reported that Rathbun had appeared in videos criticising ex-Scientologist Leah Remini and suggested he had rejoined Scientology.

== Media appearances ==
=== Scientologists at War ===
A one-hour feature on Mark Rathbun titled Scientologists at War, directed by Joseph Martin and produced by Danielle Clark and Michael Simkin was broadcast on June 17, 2013, on British Channel Four.

On November 10, 2013, The Passionate Eye, an investigative TV series rebroadcast the program as a premiere in Canada on CBC Television, describing it as an investigation into "the pressure tactics used to discredit and silence members who leave the church."

Videographer Bert Leahy reported being paid $2,000 a week to help document the "Squirrel Busters" activities.

=== Going Clear ===
Rathbun was a participant in the 2015 documentary Going Clear: Scientology and the Prison of Belief. In that film, Rathbun alleged the church had wiretapped celebrity Nicole Kidman.

=== My Scientology Movie ===
Rathbun featured in Louis Theroux's 2015 documentary film My Scientology Movie where he recreated incidents within the church he and other ex-Scientologists had witnessed. After the filming of My Scientology Movie, Rathbun criticized Theroux for what he described as "morally bankrupt tactics" in the production of the documentary, and withdrew his support from its promotion. Rathbun claimed that Theroux deliberately attempted to provoke the Scientologists filmed for the film, and over-dramatized the scenes recreating alleged abuses that had taken place in the Church.

== Legal issues ==
=== Harassment claims ===
In 2013, Mark Rathbun's wife Monique, a non-Scientologist, filed suit against the Church of Scientology alleging four years of harassment by the church. The suit was withdrawn in May 2016, Monique saying, "My husband and I have effectively achieved the primary purpose that the lawsuit was originally intended to serve by our own independent efforts". In October 2014, Rathbun filmed an encounter which showed three members of the church's top management abusing him at Los Angeles International Airport.
