= What Do I Do Now? =

1995 single by Sleeper

Single by Sleeper

from the album The It Girl
- B-side: "Paint Me"; "Room at the Top"
- Released: 25 September 1995
- Genre: Britpop
- Length: 3:41
- Label: Indolent
- Songwriter: Louise Wener
- Producer: Stephen Street

Sleeper singles chronology
"Vegas" (1995)	"What Do I Do Now?" (1995)	"Sale of the Century" (1996)

7-inch single cover

"What Do I Do Now?" is a song by English Britpop band Sleeper, written by the band's vocalist and guitarist, Louise Wener. It was the first single to be issued from their second album, The It Girl, which was released in May 1996. The song was covered by Elvis Costello for the 1997 compilation album Volume Seventeen (and later on the 2001 expanded edition of his 1996 album All This Useless Beauty. Sleeper reciprocated by covering "The Other End of the Telescope", which appeared on the B-side of "Statuesque".

== Track listings ==
- UK CD1 and 7-inch single
1. "What Do I Do Now?" – 3:41
2. "Paint Me"– 3:25
3. "Room at the Top"– 3:07
- UK CD2
1. "What Do I Do Now?" – 3:41
2. "Disco Duncan" (live) – 4:09
3. "Vegas" (live) – 3:14
4. "Amuse" (live) – 2:32
- UK cassette single
1. "What Do I Do Now?" – 3:41
2. "Paint Me"– 3:25

== Charts ==
Chart (1995)	Peak position
Scotland Singles (OCC)	16
UK Singles (OCC)	14
UK Indie (OCC)	1
