= John Dower (filmmaker) =

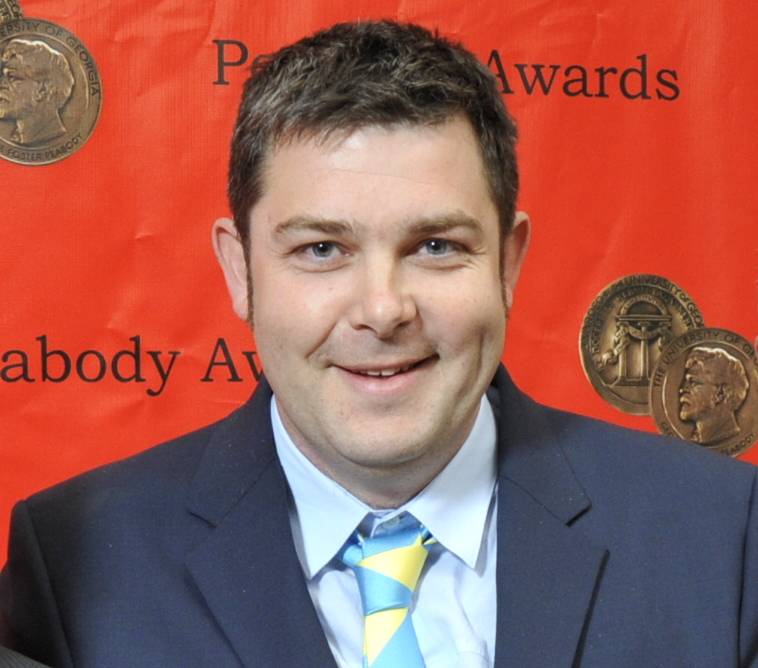
Dower in 2010

John Dower is a British film director.

== Filmography ==
- When Will I Be Famous? (2000)
- Live Forever: The Rise and Fall of Brit Pop (2003)
- Stephen Fry's Shorts (2004)
- Britney's Redneck Roots (2005)
- Sleeping with Teacher (2005)
- I Don't Like Mondays (2006)
- Once in a Lifetime: The Extraordinary Story of the New York Cosmos (2006)
- Locked Up Abroad (2007) Director, 1episode
- The Last 48 Hours of Kurt Cobain (2007)
- Thrilla in Manila (2008)
- When Boris Met Dave (2009)
- Bradley Wiggins: A Year in Yellow (2012)
- Ronald (2014)
- My Scientology Movie (2015)
- On the Record: Noel Gallagher's High Flying Birds - Who Built the Moon? (2017)
- The Mystery of D.B. Cooper (2020)
- Sophie: A Murder in West Cork (2021)
- Lockerbie (2023)
- The Man Who Definitely Didn’t Steal Hollywood (2024)
- The Balloonists (2025)
- The Alien Autopsy Scandal (2026)
