= Going Clear (film) =

2015 film by Alex Gibney

Going Clear: Scientology and the Prison of Belief
- Film poster
- Directed by: Alex Gibney
- Written by: Alex Gibney
- Based on: Going Clear by Lawrence Wright
- Produced by: Alex Gibney; Lawrence Wright; Kristen Vaurio
- Starring: Lawrence Wright; Mark Rathbun; Monique Rathbun; Mike Rinder; Jason Beghe; Paul Haggis; Sylvia Taylor; Sara Goldberg; Tony Ortega; Kim Masters
- Narrated by: Alex Gibney
- Cinematography: Sam Painter
- Edited by: Andy Grieve
- Music by: Will Bates
- Production company: Jigsaw Productions
- Distributed by: HBO Documentary Films
- Release dates: January 25, 2015 (Sundance); March 29, 2015 (HBO)
- Running time: 120 minutes
- Country: United States
- Language: English

Going Clear: Scientology and the Prison of Belief is a 2015 documentary film about Scientology. Directed by Alex Gibney and produced by HBO, it is based on Lawrence Wright's book Going Clear: Scientology, Hollywood and the Prison of Belief (2013). The film premiered at the 2015 Sundance Film Festival in Park City, Utah. It received widespread praise from critics and was nominated for seven Emmy Awards, winning three, including Best Documentary. It also received a 2015 Peabody Award and won the award for Best Documentary Screenplay from the Writers Guild of America.

The film deconstructs Scientology's claims by presenting a condensed history of the group and its founder, L. Ron Hubbard, examining how celebrities interact with Scientology, and highlighting the stories of a number of ex-members and of the abuse and exploitation that they described seeing and experiencing. The Church of Scientology responded vehemently to the film, complaining to film critics about their reviews and denouncing the filmmakers and their interviewees.

Going Clear was released in a limited number of theaters on March 13, 2015, and aired on HBO on March 29, 2015. It was a major ratings success and by mid-April 2015 had attracted 5.5 million viewers, making it the second most-watched HBO documentary in the past decade. It was subsequently released internationally, showing in theaters and on television despite a sustained campaign by the Church of Scientology to block its release.

== Synopsis ==
Going Clear is based closely on Lawrence Wright's book, covering much of the same ground with the aid of archival footage, dramatic reconstructions, and interviews with eight former Scientologists: Paul Haggis, an Oscar-winning film director; Mark Rathbun, Scientology's former second-in-command; Mike Rinder, the former head of Scientology's Office of Special Affairs; actor Jason Beghe; Sylvia "Spanky" Taylor, former liaison to John Travolta; and former Scientologists Tom DeVocht, Sara Goldberg, and Hana Eltringham Whitfield.

The film breaks into three distinct acts. In the first, the former Scientologists describe how they joined Scientology; the second act recounts the history of Scientology and its founder L. Ron Hubbard; and in the final act, the film airs allegations of the abuse of church members and misconduct by its leadership, particularly David Miscavige, who is accused of intimidating, beating, imprisoning, and exploiting subordinates. The film depicts the role played by celebrity members, such as Travolta and Tom Cruise, through video clips contrasting their statements with the experiences of former Scientologists.

To support its thesis, the film utilises footage of ex-Scientologists harassed and surveilled (per Hubbard's dictum that Scientology's critics were all criminals whose crimes needed to be exposed), and describes the imprisonment of senior Scientology executives in a facility known as "The Hole"; one Scientologist was said to have been forced to clean a bathroom with his tongue. According to the film, actress Nicole Kidman was targeted for wiretapping by Scientology in an effort to break her marriage to Tom Cruise after she was labeled a "potential trouble source" by the Scientology Church; whereas Travolta has been forced to stay in Scientology in fear that secrets from his personal life will be exposed.

== Development ==
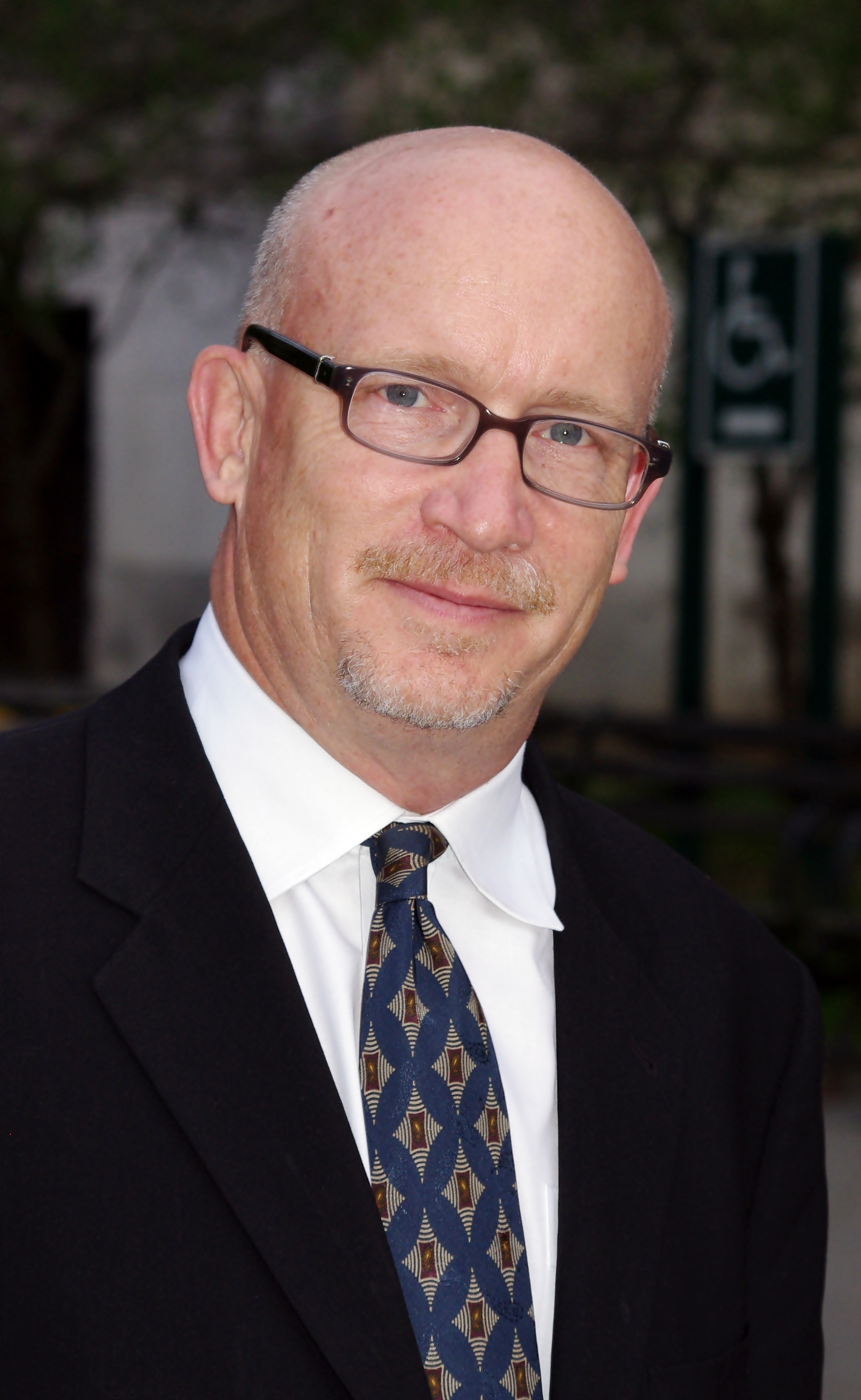
Alex Gibney, director of Going Clear

The film is based on the Pulitzer Prize–winning journalist Lawrence Wright's book Going Clear: Scientology, Hollywood, and the Prison of Belief, which was published in January 2013 and was a National Book Award finalist. HBO announced in December 2014 that Alex Gibney, an Oscar-winning director who made Enron: The Smartest Guys in the Room (2005), Taxi to the Dark Side (2007) and The Armstrong Lie (2013), was directing a film based on the book, to be released at the 2015 Sundance Festival. It was the first time that HBO had tackled Scientology directly, though not the first time it had clashed with Scientology; in 1998, protesters mounted demonstrations outside HBO's headquarters because of a documentary that presented anti-depressant drugs, which are fiercely opposed by Scientology, in a positive light.

Gibney began working on Going Clear in 2013 after becoming intrigued by Wright's book. He collaborated with Wright, who came on board as a producer, to explore the book's underlying theme of "how people become prisoners of faith in various ways". Gibney saw Scientology as one of the toughest subjects he has had to tackle in his career as a documentarian, alongside government complicity in torture, corporate financial malfeasance, and clerical sexual abuse.

Fear of Scientology's litigiousness rendered American networks unwilling to license any material to the filmmakers, which Gibney found "astounding". He commented that he "found it interesting that universally this subject – more than any other – provoked all the networks to decline to license. I think at the end of the day, that tells you more about Scientology than it does about the networks, which is how ruthless they've been in trying to silence any criticism". Scientology's reputation of harassing its critics made it necessary for Gibney to use burner phones to contact interviewees and film in secret: "Sometimes for the on-camera interviews we'd set up gear in somebody's house and I'd make sure I'd be there hours before. Then the person would show up there so it was like they were just going to somebody’s house".

Explaining why he chose to make a film about Scientology, Gibney told Reuters that he considered it "an important topic. Not only about this church of Scientology, which everybody's fascinated with partially because of the celebrities, but partially because of the way that the church seems to turn people to do things that I think they would normally never do if had they not entered the church". Gibney, Wright, and the former Scientologists who appeared in the film told a post-screening question-and-answer session that they hoped the film would raise public awareness about the alleged abuses committed by the Church of Scientology, and would prompt the media and law enforcement agencies to investigate further. Gibney later called in a Los Angeles Times opinion piece for Scientology's tax exemption to be revoked in the light of the allegations of abuse documented in the film.

== Distribution and screenings ==
=== United States ===
Going Clear made its world première on January 25, 2015, at the Sundance Film Festival in Park City, Utah. The Wall Street Journal described it as "the hottest ticket" at the festival. The première was so popular that even those with tickets were unable to find seats, because so many VIP pass-holders chose to watch the film, displacing ordinary festival-goers. It attracted numerous celebrities and media figures, including Alec Baldwin, Tobey Maguire, Jason Sudeikis, and New York Times columnist Maureen Dowd. The audience gave Going Clear a standing ovation in an unusual occurrence for a Sundance presentation. "Spanky" Taylor's appearance on stage, along with the daughter from whom the Scientology Church had forced her to "disconnect", reduced many in the audience to tears. The film was subsequently shown in a limited number of New York City, Los Angeles and San Francisco theaters from March 13, 2015.

The initial theatrical release was deliberately small-scale, most likely undertaken to ensure that Going Clear met the eligibility criteria for an Oscar nomination. Due to continuing public demand, HBO announced in July 2015 that it would be releasing the film more widely from September 25 through the ArcLight Cinemas chain's theaters in California, Chicago, Washington D.C., New York City, Texas and a few other locations around the US.

HBO broadcast the television première of Going Clear on March 29, 2015. It was the network's most successful documentary premiere since 2006, attracting 1.7 million viewers. 5.5 million viewers were reported to have watched it within only two weeks of its TV première, making it the second most successful HBO documentary in the past decade after a 2013 film on the singer Beyoncé.

=== International ===
The film sold worldwide but was scheduled only for non-theatrical release in most countries. The Church of Scientology undertook an intensive campaign to block its release internationally. According to Alex Gibney: "Every step of the way, every distributor, every festival has received multiple threatening letters from the Church of Scientology. Some have come very close to buckling". The Sydney Film Festival was among those threatened but the screening of Going Clear went ahead; Gibney declared himself to be "delighted with the way the Australians handled it". However, Australian airline Qantas, which employs Scientologist John Travolta as an ambassador, was reported to have refused to show the film on its aircraft.

The film was shown in Denmark on DR2 as Scientologys religiøse fængsel, on April 21, 2015, in Sweden on SVT1 as Fångade av scientologin on May 19, and by VPRO in the Netherlands on NPO 2 on May 19. It was released in Italy as Going Clear: Scientology e la prigione della fede on June 25.

Sky Atlantic, a co-distributor of the film, along with HBO Documentary Films, originally planned to broadcast Going Clear in the UK and Ireland soon after its US TV première. However, this was stalled due to potential legal problems. Because Northern Ireland is not subject to the Defamation Act 2013, which reformed the libel laws in other parts of the UK, and because Sky cannot differentiate its signal between regions, the film may be subject to legal challenge in Northern Ireland. The Church of Scientology successfully blocked the publication or distribution of the original book Going Clear in the UK and Ireland and indicated a willingness to sue broadcasters, saying in a statement that it "will be entitled to seek the protection of both UK and Irish libel laws in the event that any false or defamatory content in this film is broadcast within these jurisdictions".

The film eventually received a low-key release in June 2015 in 18 theaters in England and Scotland. It was broadcast on Sky Atlantic in the UK and Ireland, including Northern Ireland, on September 21, 2015, and attracted 88,000 overnight viewers. By the start of October, it had become Sky's most-watched documentary for three years, attracting a peak audience of 313,000 viewers and an average of 243,000 including catchup viewing.

== Reception ==
Review aggregator Rotten Tomatoes collected 87 reviews as of September 24, 2015, of which 94% were positive. The site's consensus states: "Thoroughly disquieting but impossible to ignore, Going Clear: Scientology and the Prison of Belief is a searing investigative work from a master documentarian". Metacritic gave the film a score of 80/100 based on 11 critics, indicating "generally favorable" reviews.

Variety's chief film critic, Scott Foundas, praised the level of detail in Going Clear and called it a "powder-keg" documentary that illustrates "the dangers of blind faith". Leslie Felperin of The Hollywood Reporter characterized it as an "impeccably assembled and argued film" that "represents a brave, timely intervention into debates around the organization that have been simmering for some time". Slate called the film "a stunning exposé of an organization and religion too long shrouded in mystery". Screen Daily's Anthony Kaufman felt that some of the re-enactments in the film were "heavy-handed or sensationalistic", but commended it overall as "a serious, strange and unsettling account of brainwashing, greed and gross misuses of power".

Writing in The Guardian, Brian Moylan described Going Clear as "entertaining and dismaying viewing" in which "the story of Scientology, with all its strange players, emerges as comedy, rather than horror", but criticised its reliance on a small group of defectors and the lack of any involvement by the Scientology Church. He felt that this made the film "a bit one-sided" and that it was "easy to be skeptical about some of the more outlandish claims made by former members".

Sasha Bronner of the Huffington Post called the film a "shocking and eye-opening" work that would leave those who did not know much about Scientology "spellbound". The BBC's Owen Gleiberman praised it as "the most exciting – and disturbing – work of cinematic non-fiction in a long time" and awarded Going Clear five stars, describing it as having "the scary intensity of a thriller".

Following the initial HBO broadcast of Going Clear, Saturday Night Live aired a music video featuring the "Church of Neurotology", a parody of Scientology's 1990 music video "We Stand Tall", clips from which were shown in the documentary.

=== Awards and nominations ===
Going Clear received a total of seven nominations for the 67th Primetime Emmy Awards. The film was nominated in the categories for Outstanding Documentary or Nonfiction Special, Cinematography for Nonfiction Programming, Picture Editing for Nonfiction Programming, Sound Editing for Nonfiction Programming (single or multi-camera) and Sound Mixing for Nonfiction Programming (single or multi-camera). Alex Gibney also received two nominations for Writing for Nonfiction Programming and Direction for Nonfiction Programming.

The film won in three Emmy categories: Outstanding Documentary or Nonfiction Special, Outstanding Writing for Nonfiction Programming and Outstanding Directing for Nonfiction Programming. Gibney praised the "courageous support" of HBO executives and the "courage of witnesses who stood up against ... the human rights abuses" of Scientology. He suggested that a sequel to Going Clear might be in the works: "There's a lot more material already that I've received, more to come out – and so far the IRS has not revoked its [tax-exemption] protection so there’s a lot more to be done." On December 1, the film was selected as one of 15 shortlisted for the Academy Award for Best Documentary Feature. It also won the Writers Guild of America Award for Best Documentary Screenplay in 2015, and won a 2015 George Foster Peabody Award, presented at the 2016 awards ceremony.

== Scientology reaction ==
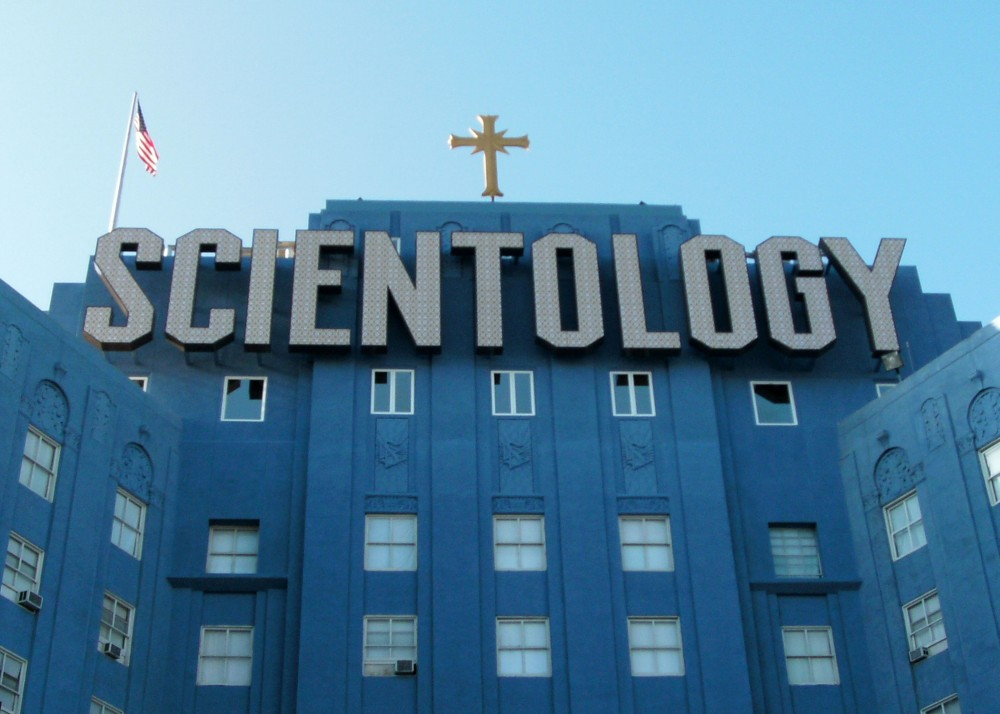
The Church of Scientology stood in strong opposition to the film.

Ten days before the film's premiere, the Church of Scientology took out full-page advertisements in The New York Times and Los Angeles Times to denounce Going Clear, comparing it to the story "A Rape on Campus" published by Rolling Stone magazine. Gibney subsequently said that he was grateful for the church's advertising, as it had attracted much publicity for the film; he only wished "they'd put in showtimes". The head of HBO Documentary Films, Sheila Nevins, commented that when she saw the advertisements she knew that Going Clear would be a big success: "Docs don’t get full page ads, and when they do, they do really well".

Scientology also published a "special report" attacking the film on one of its websites, started a new Twitter account which claimed to be "taking a resolute stand against the broadcasting and publishing of false information" and bought numerous ads around Google search results relating to the film in order to direct searchers to its anti-Going Clear pages. Additionally, Scientology posted a series of short films on its website attacking the filmmakers and their interviewees, with titles such as "Alex Gibney Documentary Going Clear Propaganda", "Marty Rathbun: A Violent Psychopath", "Mike Rinder: The Wife Beater", "Sara Goldberg: The Home Wrecker" and "Paul Haggis: The Hypocrite of Hollywood".

Scientology complained that Gibney had declined to interview 25 of its members whom it had put forward to him. According to Gibney, Miscavige, Travolta, and Cruise all declined interviews. Instead, Scientology offered "a delegation of 25 unidentified individuals, presumably to smear the people in our film", which did not interest Gibney. Scientology also denounced the film's interviewees as "the usual collection of obsessive, disgruntled former Church members kicked out as long as 30 years ago for malfeasance, who have a documented history of making up lies about the Church for money".

=== Campaign against film interviewees and critics ===
According to Gibney, the Church of Scientology mounted an "organized" and "brutal" response to the appearance of its former members in the film: "Some of them have had physical threats, people threatening to take their homes away, private investigators following them. That's the part that's really heartbreaking". In March 2015, a New York private investigator named Eric Saldarriaga pleaded guilty to the federal charge of conspiracy to commit computer hacking after he illegally gained access to at least 60 email accounts on behalf of undisclosed clients, one of the main ones reportedly being "someone who has done investigations on behalf of the Church of Scientology". Among those targeted were Mike Rinder and the journalist Tony Ortega, both interviewees in the film. The names of Saldarriaga's clients were not revealed and prosecutors declined to pursue action against anyone else, citing a lack of evidence. A few weeks after the film's TV première, Paul Haggis reported that a suspected Scientology spy posing as a reporter for Time had attempted to interview him in a possible attempt to obtain material to use against him; the Church denied the claim. Tony Ortega and another interviewee in the film, former Scientologist Marc Headley, reported that investigators from the Church had surveilled them at Salt Lake City airport as they made their way to the Sundance Film Festival.

Scientology contacted film critics complaining that their reviews of Going Clear were "filled with bald faced lies" and demanding that the critics should publish a statement rebutting the film. Jason Bailey of Flavorwire wrote that "pretty much every critic who wrote about Going Clear" received an email from Scientology spokesperson Karin Pouw. He commented that Scientology did not seem to realise that film critics do not usually try to interview people for reviews, and noted how neatly it "comports with the film's portrayal of the Church as a hive of shady, paranoid control freaks". In an email to Flavorwire, Gibney observed that "anytime someone writes something – film criticism or social criticism – about Scientology, the Church of Scientology counter-attacks by smearing critics".

Indiewire's Max O'Connell criticised Scientology's approach as counterproductive. He predicted that "their campaign against the film is going to be the best publicity that Alex Gibney and company could ever hope for, if also a hassle for critics and filmmakers and (this is no small thing) a nightmare for the ex-CoS members who dared to speak out against Scientology's practices. But then, they don't seem terribly aware that attacking everyone who criticizes you doesn't do a lot of good for your image". Paul Haggis, who was labeled "doughy" and "pasty" by the church, likewise felt that the attacks were backfiring: "You don't think that makes you look really bad trying to slander me in that way? I'm an imperfect human being. And I've made many, many mistakes in my life. So you can absolutely publicize any of those. But this, really, (you’re) thinking that makes you look good?"

The filmmakers reported receiving "lots of cards and letters" from the church, though in their case it had limited its response to "loads of legal paperwork". HBO had earlier said that it had put "probably 160 lawyers" onto the task of reviewing the film in anticipation of challenges from the notoriously litigious group. Sheila Nevins of HBO commented that she could not believe how aggressive the Church had been. Not only did it effectively provide free advertising for the film, but its hostility had made HBO Documentary Films even more determined to produce the film: "I thought, 'They really don't want us to do it. All the reason more to do it".

=== Campaign to influence Oscar awards ===
Following the film's success at the Emmys, the Church of Scientology was reported to have mounted an aggressive campaign to deny its recognition at the Oscars. Scientology's campaign included producing an anti-Gibney film and approaches to members of the Academy's documentary branch, responsible for selecting contenders for the awards. Several members of the documentary branch reported receiving approaches from Scientology's magazine Freedom in connection with a planned profile of Gibney. Although Scientology denied that its actions had anything to do with the Oscars, Lawrence Wright suggested that its "more feverish attention to the documentary" had to do with it feeling "threatened by the possibility that [the Hollywood] community would examine the church more closely" as the Oscars approached. In January 2016, according to The Hollywood Reporter, the film and Gibney were reported to have been "snubbed" by Oscar voters and not included in the Best Documentary category of the 88th Academy Awards.
