= Inbetweener (song) =

1995 single by Sleeper

Single by Sleeper

from the album Smart
- B-side: "Little Annie"; "Disco Duncan"; "Bank"
- Released: 9 January 1995
- Genre: Britpop
- Length: 3:18
- Label: Indolent
- Songwriter: Louise Wener
- Producer: Paul Corkett

Sleeper singles chronology
"Delicious" (1994)	"Inbetweener" (1995)	"Vegas" (1995)

Music video
- "Inbetweener" on YouTube

"Inbetweener" is a song by English Britpop band Sleeper, written by the band's vocalist and guitarist, Louise Wener. It was the third single to be released from their debut album, Smart, in 1995. It was their breakthrough single, reaching number 16 on the UK Singles Chart. Wener stated that "Inbetweener" was a reference to her upbringing in an English commuter town: "it's about where people live and what they do in suburbia, and it's about unfulfilled dreams".

== Release ==
Indolent released "Inbetweener" across four single formats on 9 January 1995. A week later, "Inbetweener" debuted at number 16 on the UK singles chart and spent a further three weeks on the charts. According to Louise Wener, the record label had not pressed enough copies, so when the demand for the single was higher than expected, they could not restock record shops fast enough, resulting in a substantially lower chart position than indicated by the midweeks. Indolent reported to Billboard that the single sold 34,000 units in three weeks. The album release of Smart followed on 13 February.

The music video for "Inbetweener" was notable for featuring UK daytime television presenter Dale Winton (then of Supermarket Sweep fame) in a cameo appearance. He peers over shelves and shakes pipes of Pringles as if they're musical shakers, while the band perform in the supermarket aisles. For the North American market, Arista funded a second video shoot for the song.

== Track listings ==
All tracks were written by Louise Wener.

- UK 12-inch single
1. "Inbetweener" – 3:02
2. "Little Annie" – 2:49
3. "Disco Duncan" – 3:30
4. "Bank"– 1:28
- UK CD single; European maxi-CD single
1. "Inbetweener" – 3:02
2. "Little Annie" – 2:49
3. "Disco Duncan" – 3:30
- UK 7-inch and cassette single
1. "Inbetweener" – 3:02
2. "Little Annie" – 2:49

== Charts ==
Chart (1995)	Peak position
Scotland Singles (Official Charts)	13
UK Singles (Official Charts)	16
UK Indie (Music Week)	1
