= Sleeper (band) =

English rock band

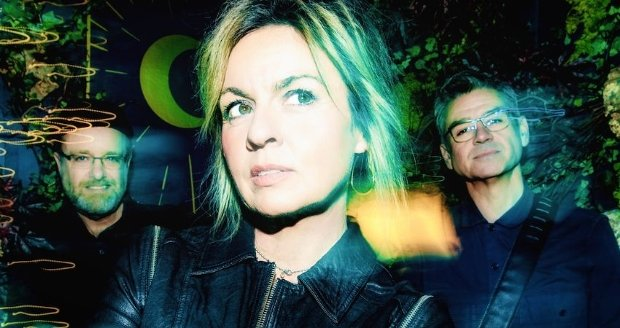
- Sleeper in 2024

Background information
- Origin: London, England
- Genres: Indie rock; Britpop
- Years active: 1992–1998; 2017–present
- Labels: Indolent; Gorsky
- Members: Louise Wener; Jon Stewart; Andy Maclure; Kieron Pepper
- Past members: Diid Osman; Chris Giammalvo; Dan Kaufmann

Sleeper are an English rock band formed in London in 1992. The group had eight UK top 40 hit singles and three UK top 10 albums during the 1990s. Their music was also featured in the soundtrack of the pop cultural hit movie Trainspotting. The band split up in 1998, but reunited in 2017.

== History ==
=== First three albums (1992–1998) ===
Jon Stewart met Louise Wener at Manchester University in 1987 in a political philosophy class. They played in a number of bands at university, including jazz outfit the Lime Street Blues Band, then after graduating in 1988, moved to London to seek gigs. Wener later wrote that "we sounded not unlike the Sundays, but as time went on our music became increasingly influenced by US bands such as Hole, Nirvana and, most especially, the Pixies". They advertised for new band members in Melody Maker ("Bass player and drummer wanted. Influences The Pixies and The Partridge Family") and recruited Diid Osman and Andy Maclure. Wener solicited interest from record label representatives by sending out a fake NME review, a move she called "pure cheek and cut-and-paste fakery."

At one point, the band called themselves Surrender Dorothy, after the smoke trail in the sky from the Wizard of Oz movie, but abandoned this idea after discovering that several other bands had done the same thing. They subsequently chose the name "Sleeper" after the Woody Allen film Sleeper, and also because the word has a number of different meanings (a spy, an unexpected hit, etc.). In 1993 Sleeper signed to Indolent Records, a subsidiary of RCA Records, and released three EPs and singles before their breakthrough single release, "Inbetweener", which notably featured UK TV personality Dale Winton in the promo video. Prior to the release of "Inbetweener" Sleeper had been the opening act for Blur on that band's tour to promote the Parklife album, and became closely associated with Britpop as a result.

The band's debut album release Smart was certified gold by the BPI for sales of over 100,000 copies. It was followed by the platinum-selling (over 300,000 copies) release The It Girl which yielded four top 20 hit singles "What Do I Do Now?", "Nice Guy Eddie", "Sale of the Century" and "Statuesque". Sleeper recorded a cover of the Blondie song "Atomic", which was used in the film Trainspotting, after Blondie refused to allow the use of the original version. "Statuesque" also features in the movie and its follow-up soundtrack volume. The band’s third album, Pleased to Meet You, released October 1997, was a UK Top 10 hit and certified silver, though had fewer sales than the previous albums; the band split in March 1998 after a tour in which venues had been cancelled or downsized due to lower than expected ticket sales.

=== Post-split (1999–2016) ===
After Sleeper split, Wener and Maclure recorded material for a new project, aimed at a more mainstream market and featuring a guest appearance by George Michael. However, the project was not completed at the time, and Wener went on to have a career as a novelist. Her fourth book for Hodder & Stoughton was published in 2008. Wener also features prominently as an interviewee in John Dower's feature film documentary on Britpop, Live Forever (2003).

Stewart moved to Los Angeles, California, where he played with West Coast band UFO Bro and contributed as a session guitarist to k.d. lang's album Invincible Summer (2000) and Melanie C's album Reason. After returning to the UK he became Course Leader of the BA (Hons) Music Business and a lecturer in popular culture and music history at the British and Irish Modern Music Institute in Brighton, where his former students include The Kooks, James Bay, Black Honey, The Xcerts, Kate Walsh and Luke Sital-Singh, as well as members of As It Is and Miss Vincent, amongst others. Stewart also wrote a monthly column for Guitarist magazine from 2002 to 2010, and gained a PhD in Music from the University of Southampton in 2018. In 2019 he joined The Wedding Present as guitarist during their thirtieth anniversary Bizarro UK and EU tour.

Osman subsequently went on to become a session player with Parlophone records band Dubstar and later became an artist manager, with bands including Infectious Music outfit My Vitriol, Hell Is For Heroes on EMI and Atlantic Records band The Glitterati, and helped writer-producer Justin Parker sign to Sony Music publishing. Maclure later ran a "Punk Rock Karaoke" enterprise with DJ Steve Lamacq.

A greatest hits compilation, with a tracklisting selected by and artwork designed by the band themselves, was released on Sony/BMG in 2007. Their first two albums were reissued as deluxe versions on 29 November 2010, with second discs of B-sides and live tracks.

By 2014, Wener and MacLure had formed another band, Huge Advance, although they only played in and around their residential suburb of Crouch End.

=== Reunion (2017–present) ===
Sleeper reformed in 2017 to play in four British cities in July and August, as part of the Star Shaped Festival, alongside other Britpop acts including Space, Dodgy and The Bluetones. These dates saw Wener, Maclure and Stewart joined on bass by new member Kieron Pepper, previously known as live drummer for The Prodigy from 1997 to 2007, and were followed by an eleven-date headline tour of the UK in spring 2018.

In the summer of 2018, Sleeper announced that they were recording a new album in collaboration with their old producer Stephen Street for release in early 2019 and that this would be accompanied by another headline UK tour. Lead single "Look at You Now" premiered on BBC Radio 6 Music on 4 December 2018, while presenter Steve Lamacq announced the title of the new album was The Modern Age.

During 2020 Wener and Maclure compiled unreleased material from previous recording sessions, including the George Michael collaboration, with new material as the basis for a new Sleeper album This Time Tomorrow, released on 14 December 2020.

In 2021, Sleeper were credited on "Bad Things", an R&B-laced indie-pop track by Greater Manchester based band The Lottery Winners. The track features vocals from Louise Wener and can be found on an eight-track EP by The Lottery Winners called Start Again.

The band toured the UK in Spring 2022 performing their 1996 album The It Girl. The Lottery Winners were the support act. In 2023 the band undertook a UK acoustic tour as 'Sleeper unplugged'.

== Image ==
Frontwoman Louise Wener, along with Elastica's Justine Frischmann, was one of Britpop's biggest female stars, and became one of its enduring sex symbols, placing highly in Melody Maker and NME "Sexiest Woman" polls two years running. Wener enjoyed significant media coverage, including an NME front cover and a slot as guest presenter of Top of the Pops. The band had multiple appearances on The Word (TV series) and also on TFI Friday. Billboard described how Wener's "forthright opinions on female sexuality, censorship, and other issues, have been manna for feature editors."

The band was the inspiration for the phrase "Sleeperbloke", referring to the disparity between the glamorous singer Wener and the other frequently ignored members of the band (who tended to be far more anonymous and stood at the back). This pejorative term was used by music press journalists and musicians, to refer to any person of limited standing within a band or an especially drab and unremarkable individual. The "Sleeperblokes" themselves were reported to be highly amused by the phrase, and even produced an ironic "Sleeperbloke" T-shirt to go with Wener's "Another Female Fronted Band" T-shirt, both of which sold well.

== Members ==
Current

- Louise Wener – vocals, rhythm guitar (1993–1998, 2017–present)
- Jon Stewart – lead guitar (1993–1998, 2017–present)
- Andy Maclure – drums (1993–1998, 2017–present)
- Kieron Pepper – bass guitar (2017–present)

Past

- Diid Osman – bass guitar (1993–1997)
- Chris Giammalvo – bass guitar (1997)
- Dan Kaufmann – bass guitar (1997–1998)

== Discography ==
Sleeper discography
- Studio albums: 5
- Extended plays: 1
- Compilation albums: 2
- Singles: 14

=== Studio albums ===
List of studio albums, with selected chart positions
Title	Details	Peak chart positions	Certifications
Title	Details	UK	Certifications
Smart	Released: 13 February 1995; Label: Indolent (SLEEP007) / Gorsky Records (2020) (SLEEP025); Format: CD, CS, DL, LP; Also issued in 2011 as 2 CD expanded edition on Cherry Red Records (CDBRED477)	5	UK: Gold
The It Girl	Released: 6 May 1996; Label: Indolent (SLEEP012) / Gorsky Records (2022) (SLEEP029); Format: CD, CS, DL, LP; Also issued in 2011 as 2 CD expanded edition on Cherry Red Records (CDBRED476)	5	UK: Platinum
Pleased to Meet You	Released: 13 October 1997; Label: Indolent (SLEEP016); Format: CD, CS, DL, LP	7	UK: Silver
The Modern Age	Released: 22 March 2019; Label: Gorsky Records (SLEEP019); Format: CD, DL, LP, CS	18	
This Time Tomorrow	Released: 11 June 2021; Label: Gorsky Records (SLEEP027); Format: CD, DL, LP	35	
End of the World	Released: 12 February 2027; Label: Gorsky Records (SLEEP31); Format: CD, DL, LP		
"—" denotes a recording that did not chart or was not released in that territory.

=== Compilation albums ===
List of compilation albums
Title	Details
Greatest Hits	Released: 2007; Label: Sony BMG (88697106042); Format: CD, DL
Inbetweener – The Best of Sleeper	Released: 19 February 2016; Label: Master Club Deluxe (MCDLX216); Format: CD, DL
Live at the BBC	Released: 20 June 2020; Label: Gorsky Records (SLEEP24); Format: LP, DL
The It Girl – B Sides & Demos	Released: 11 November 2022; Label: Gorsky Records (SLEEP29CDL); Format: CD
Live It Girl – Anniversary Tour	Released: 11 November 2022; Label: Gorsky Records (SLEEP30CD); Format: CD, DL

=== Singles ===
List of singles with selected chart positions, showing year released and album name
Title	Year	Label / Catalog Number	Peak chart positions	Album
Title	Year	Label / Catalog Number	UK	Album
Alice EP	1993	Indolent (SLEEP001)	126	Smart
"Swallow"	1994	Indolent (SLEEP002)	76	Smart
"Delicious"	1994	Indolent (SLEEP003)	75	Smart
Bucket & Spade (mail order only live EP)	1994	Indolent (SLEEP004)	—	Smart
Georgeous and Fully Equipped (fan club flexi album sampler)	1994	Indolent (SLEEP005)	—	Smart
"Inbetweener"	1995	Indolent (SLEEP006)	16	Smart
"Vegas"	1995	Indolent (SLEEP008)	33	Smart
"What Do I Do Now?"	1995	Indolent (SLEEP009) / (SLEEP010)	14	The It Girl
"Sale of the Century"	1996	Indolent (SLEEP011)	10	The It Girl
"Nice Guy Eddie"	1996	Indolent (SLEEP013)	10	The It Girl
"Statuesque"	1996	Indolent (SLEEP014)	17	The It Girl
"She's a Good Girl"	1997	Indolent (SLEEP015)	28	Pleased to Meet You
"Romeo Me"	1997	Indolent (SLEEP017)	39	Pleased to Meet You
"Look at You Now"	2018	Gorsky Records (SLEEP018)	—	The Modern Age
"The Sun Also Rises"	2019	Gorsky Records (SLEEP020)	—	The Modern Age
"More Than I Do" (digital only)	2019	Gorsky Records	—	The Modern Age
"Live at the Ritz"	2019	Gorsky Records (SLEEP021)	—	—
"Vegas 2020" (digital only)	2020	Gorsky Records	—	—
"We Should Be Together" (digital only)	2021	Gorsky Records	—	This Time Tomorrow
"End of the World" (digital only)	2026	Gorsky Records	—	End of the World
"Incomplete" (digital only)	2026	Gorsky Records	—	End of the World
"—" denotes a recording that did not chart or was not released in that territory.

=== Other appearances ===
Title	Year	Album
"Pyrotechnician (I Think I Love You)" (demo)	1995	Sharks Patrol These Waters: The Best of Volume, Pt. II
"Bedside Manners" (live at London Astoria)	1995	Home Truths
"Disco Duncan" (Peel session)	1995	...Hold On (BBC Radio 1FM Sessions)
"Atomic"	1996	Trainspotting: Music from the Motion Picture
"Sale of the Century" (live at BBC Sound City)	1996	Radio One Sound City Leeds 1996
"The Other End of the Telescope"	1996	"All This Useless Beauty" single
"Mr Kiss Kiss Bang Bang" (featuring David Gedge)	2020	Not from Where I'm Standing
"Bad Things" (with The Lottery Winners)	2021	Something to Leave the House For

=== Music videos ===
Title	Year	Director
"Delicious"	1994	unknown
"Inbetweener" (UK Version)	1995	Nick Egan
"Inbetweener" (US Version)	1995	unknown
"Vegas"	1995	unknown
"What Do I Do Now?"	1995	Lindy Heymann
"Sale of the Century"	1996	Nic Goffey and Dominic Hawley
"Nice Guy Eddie"	1996	Garth Jennings
"Statuesque"	1996	unknown
"She's a Good Girl"	1997	unknown
"Romeo Me"	1997	unknown
"Look at You Now"	2019	unknown
"The Sun Also Rises"	2019	unknown
"More Than I Do"	2019	unknown
"Tell Me Where You're Going"	2021	Keith Davey
