= Louise Wener =

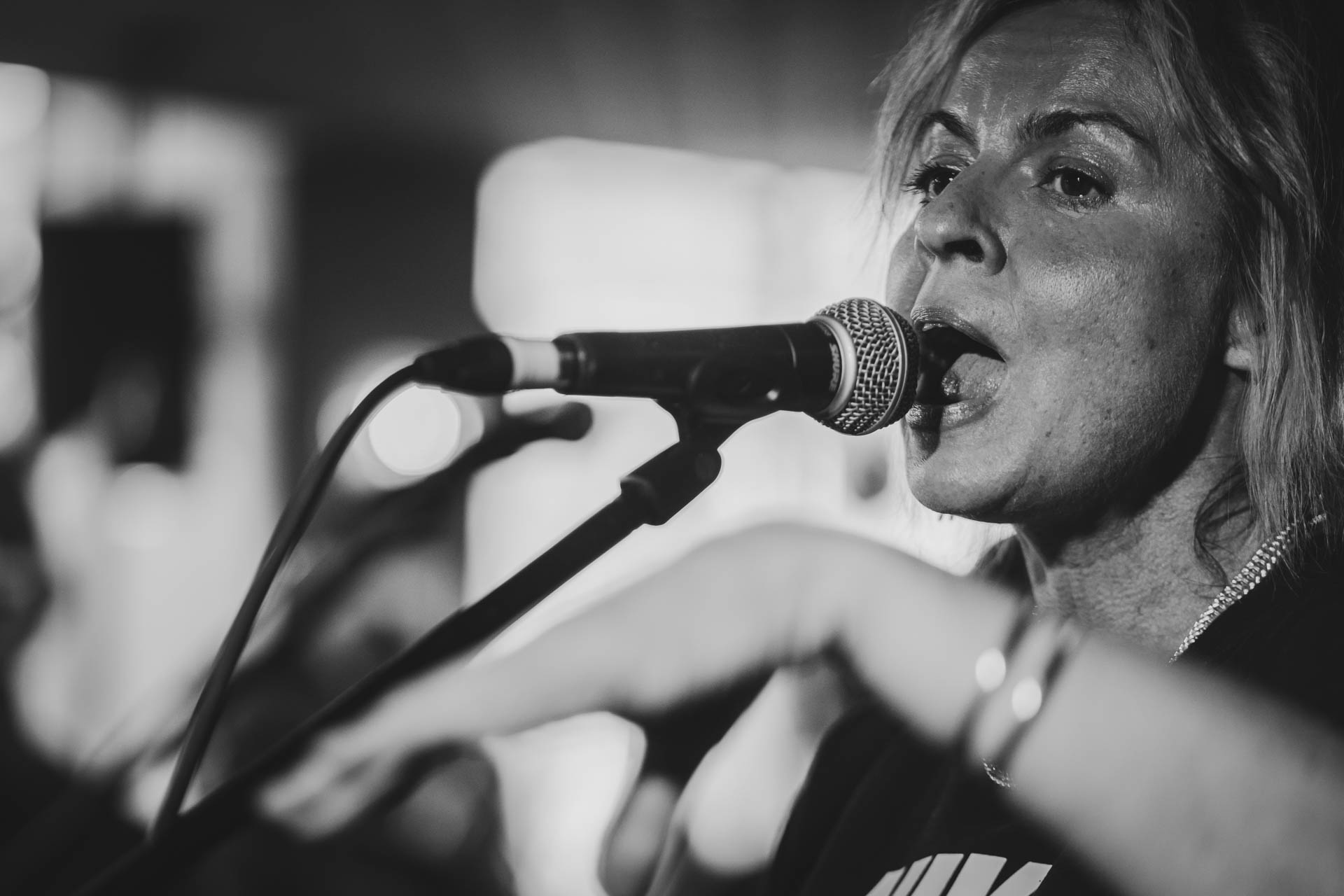
- Wener in 2023

Background information
- Born: Louise Jane Wener; 30 July 1966 (age 60)
- Origin: Gants Hill, London, England
- Genres: Indie rock, Britpop
- Occupations: Singer, writer
- Instruments: Vocals, guitar
- Years active: 1993–1998, 2017–present (music); 1998–present (writing)
- Member of: Sleeper

Louise Jane Wener (born 30 July 1966) is an English writer, singer, songwriter and guitarist of the band Sleeper.

== Life ==
Born in Gants Hill, London, Wener is the younger daughter of Donald Wener, an Inland Revenue tax inspector from East Ham who had served in the RAF, and Audrey (née Dixon), a bank clerk and former nurse. Her elder sister was the writer Sue Margolis. Their brother Geoff managed Sleeper after attending Cambridge University.

Wener attended Manchester University, where she met Jon Stewart, which led to the formation of Sleeper.

Sleeper recorded three full-length albums prior to splitting: Smart, The It Girl and Pleased to Meet You. After the band split up in 1998, Wener began a writing career, and has written four novels: Goodnight Steve McQueen, The Big Blind (also known as The Perfect Play), The Half Life of Stars, and Worldwide Adventures In Love. Her autobiography, Different for Girls: My True-life Adventures in Pop (also known as Just For One Day: Adventures in Britpop), was published in June 2010. Wener co-wrote a BBC Radio 4 drama series, Queens of Noise, with Roy Boulter of The Farm. It ran for two five-programme series in the 10.45 AM Woman's Hour drama slot, focusing on the rise of a fictional indie band, Velveteens.

In addition to writing herself, Wener has taught novel-writing. With her partner, Sleeper drummer Andy Maclure, she formed another band, Huge Advance, although they only played in and around their residential suburb of Crouch End. By 2011, she and Maclure had married and moved to Brighton, where Maclure teaches at a music college. They have a son and a daughter. Wener has written an article about motherhood for The Guardian.

Sleeper reformed in 2017 to play in four British cities in July and August as part of the Star Shaped Festival. They went on to headline an eleven-date tour in 2018. The band have since recorded two new albums: The Modern Age, released in March 2019, and This Time Tomorrow, released in December 2020.

In 2021, Wener teamed up with the Greater Manchester indie band The Lottery Winners to record "Bad Things", an R&B-laced indie-pop track from the Leigh band's eight-track EP Start Again (with "Bad Things" being credited to The Lottery Winners featuring Sleeper, rather than featuring Louise Wener).

In 2025, Wener presented a four part Sunday night radio show on Absolute Radio.

== Bibliography ==
- Goodnight Steve McQueen. Flame. 1 August 2002. ISBN 0-340-82029-2.
- The Big Blind. Flame. 2003. ISBN 0340-82031-4.
- The Perfect Play: A Novel. HarperCollins Publishers 5 October 2005/ ISBN 978-0-06-058548-8.
- Different for Girls. Ebury Press. 20 June 2010. ISBN 978-0-09-193651-8.
- Just for One Day: Adventures in Britpop. Random House. 31 July 2012. ISBN 978-1-44-640792-9.
