= Indolent Records =

British record label

- Parent company: RCA Records
- Founded: 1993
- Defunct: 1998
- Distributor(s): BMG
- Genre: Britpop, indie rock, alternative rock
- Country of origin: United Kingdom

Indolent Records was a British record label established up in 1993 as a subsidiary of RCA Records and BMG. The label roster included Sleeper, The Wannadies, Stephen Duffy and 60ft Dolls. The label was folded into RCA Records in 1998.

== See also ==
- List of record labels
